= Abdication of Henri, Grand Duke of Luxembourg =

2025 abdication of the throne of Luxembourg

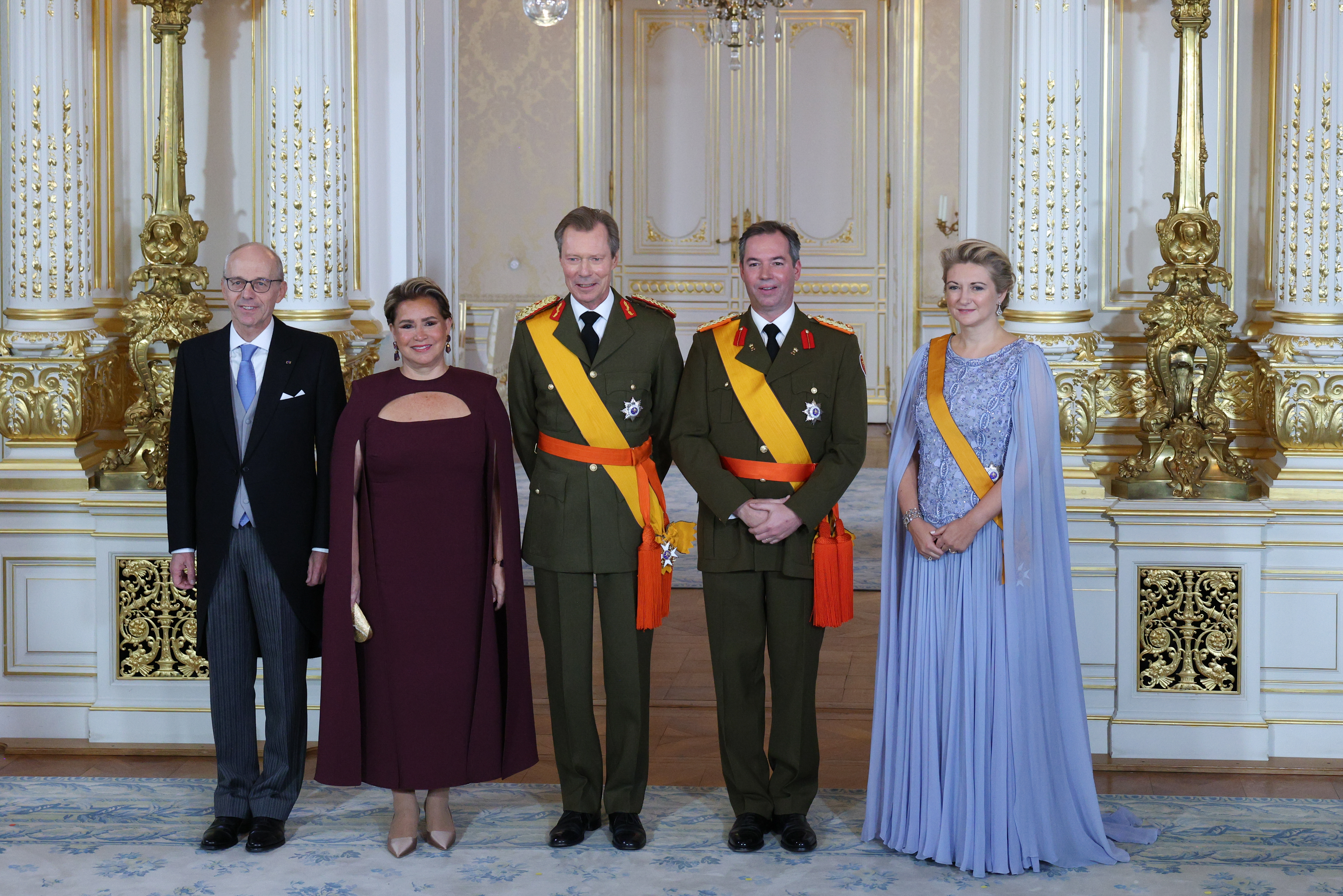
The outgoing and incoming grand ducal couples at the abdication ceremony in the Grand Ducal Palace

Grand Duke Henri abdicated the throne of Luxembourg in favour of his eldest son, Guillaume V, on 3 October 2025 at the Grand Ducal Palace in Luxembourg City.

== Background ==
In the grand ducal family of Luxembourg, it is customary for the monarch to appoint their heir apparent as lieutenant-representative. This regent assumes most of the monarch's constitutional powers in preparation for their accession to the throne.

On 28 April 1961, Grand Duchess Charlotte appointed her son Prince Jean as lieutenant-representative, more than three years before she abdicated in his favour on 12 November 1964. Similarly, Jean made his son, Henri, lieutenant-representative on 4 March 1998, before he formally abdicated on 7 October 2000.

In January 2020, during the twentieth anniversary of Henri's accession to the throne and after the release of the Waringo report, he was asked by the Luxembourg Times whether rumours of his imminent abdication were true. Henri said an abdication "isn't possible" and added that it would "be like surrendering".

In April 2024, after the abdication of Queen Margrethe II of Denmark, Henri was asked by La Libre about his possible future retirement. Henri answered that he "intends to retire at some point" and confirmed, "There are plans. There will come a day when it will have to be done, and I intend to retire at some point. It's obvious." He said that his future abdication had been planned and discussed in "family consultation" and when asked whether he knew when it would occur, he responded, "Yes, but I won't tell you that!"

== Announcement ==
During his official birthday speech on 23 June 2024, Henri, then 69, said that he planned to abdicate and that he would begin transferring his constitutional powers, roles, and positions to his eldest son and the heir apparent, Guillaume. Despite his past statements about a future abdication, the announcement was widely described as unexpected. Henri said during his address, "I would like to inform you that I have decided to appoint Prince Guillaume as lieutenant-representative in October. It is with all my love and confidence that I wish him the best of luck." The prime minister of Luxembourg, Luc Frieden, said the announcement marks "the beginning of a next chapter for our monarchy" and explained that he had been in discussions with Henri regarding the matter "for some time". He agreed with Henri's decision to announce it on 23 June, the national holiday, as "the grand duke is the symbol of" Luxembourg. It was later announced in July 2024 that Guillaume's appointment as Lieutenant-Representative would occur on 8 October 2024.

On 8 October, Guillaume was sworn in as Lieutenant-Representative at the Grand Ducal Palace, followed by in the Chamber of Deputies. Henri commented, "I really want to give Prince Guillaume a lot more responsibility, because I think I really need to slow down."

The year 2024 is drawing to a close, and Christmas is the perfect time to reflect on the past year. This time, I do so with great emotion, as it is the last time that I shall deliver the Christmas speech as Head of State.

— Henri, 24 December 2024

On 24 December 2024, during his annual Christmas address, Henri officially announced that he would abdicate the throne on 3 October 2025 in Guillaume's favour. Henri's opening line mentioned his abdication and he commented, "Prince Guillaume has been Lieutenant-Représentant since 8 October and is preparing intensively for his accession to the throne".

Henri described his feelings of "deep gratitude and humility" when reflecting on the past 25 years of his reign and noted that he and his wife, Grand Duchess Maria Teresa, were "pleased to have been able to be part of that journey". Henri justified his abdication by citing that "most" of his generation had reached the time of retirement, saying that "the time has now come" and calling it a "natural process". Additionally, he also reassured his trust in Guillaume and his wife, Stéphanie, saying, "I know that they will do their utmost to contribute to the well-being of our country."

== Abdication ==
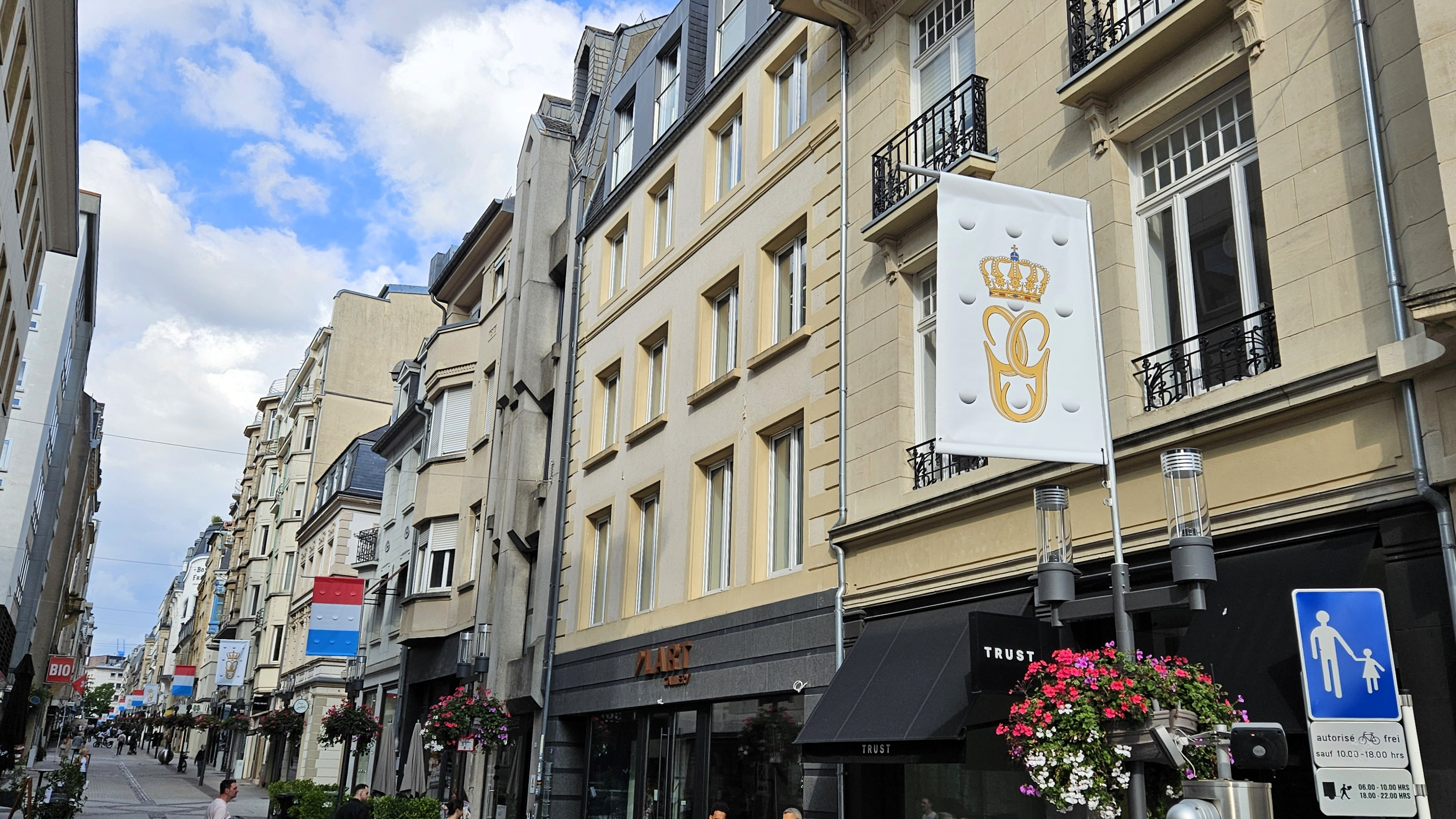
Street decoration in Luxembourg City ahead of the Trounwiessel festivities, featuring the flag of Luxembourg and Guillaume's monogram

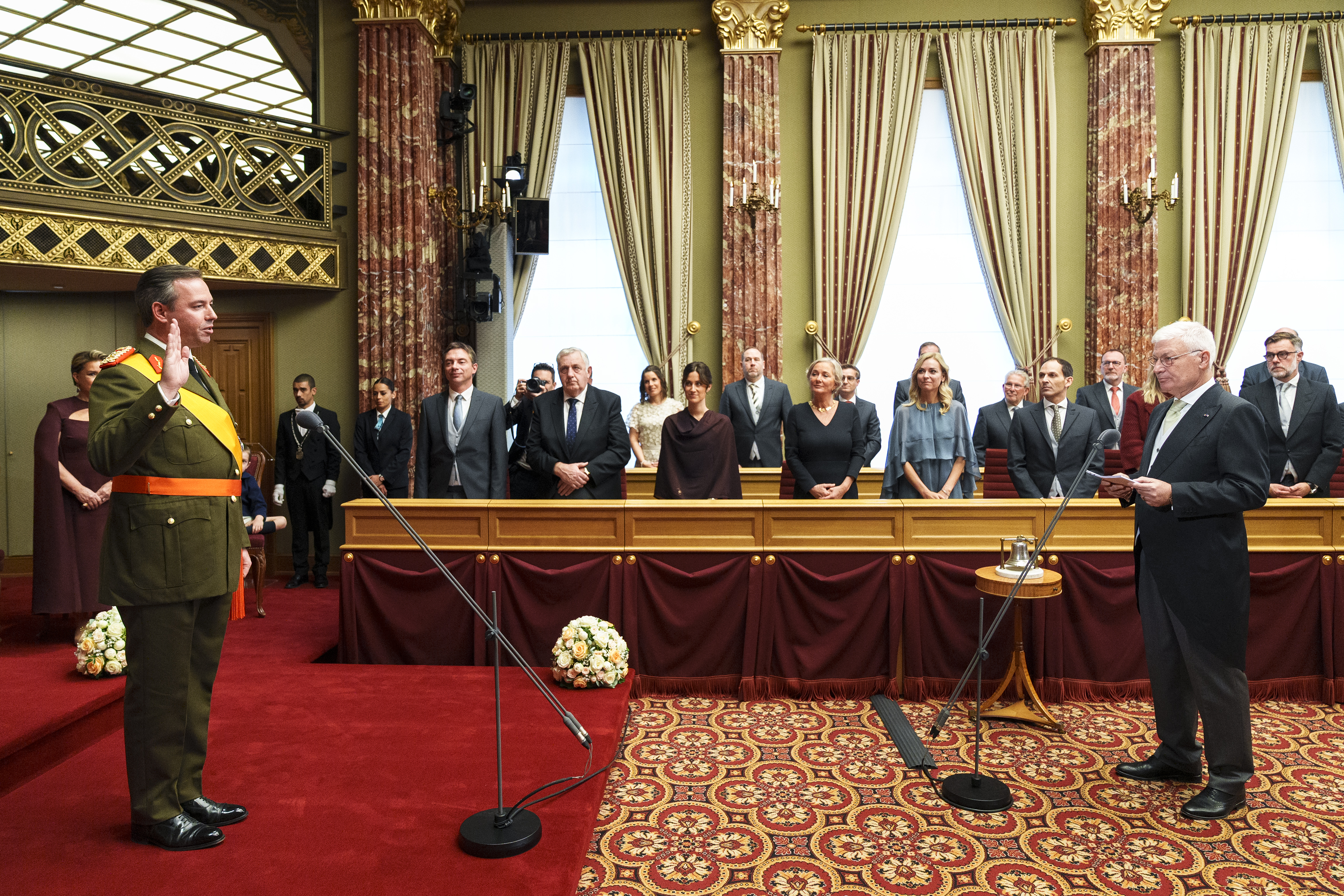
Guillaume being sworn in by President of the Chamber of Deputies Claude Wiseler

Henri signed the decree formalising his abdication at 10:00 (CEST) on 3 October 2025 at the Grand Ducal Palace, four days before what would have been his Silver Jubilee.

Grand Duke Henri's immediate family were in attendance for the abdication. King Willem-Alexander and Queen Máxima of the Netherlands also witnessed the signing of the Grand Ducal Act of Abdication as did King Philippe and Queen Mathilde of Belgium.

The Grand Ducal Act of Abdication was countersigned by Prime Minister Luc Frieden. After the signing, Frieden made a short speech praising Grand Duke Henri, calling him "the symbol of Luxembourg, of its independence and sovereignty, at home and abroad. You were, you are and you will remain an essential part of what we call our nation."

A large crowd gathered outside the Grand Ducal Palace to see the procession of royal guests make the short walk to the neighbouring Chamber of Deputies.

At 11:00, Guillaume, in accordance with the constitution, swore an oath at the adjacent Chamber of Deputies, officially marking the start of his reign as Grand Duke.

Grand Duke Henri and Grand Duchess Maria Teresa were in the Chamber of Deputies to watch, along with Guillaume's sons, Charles and Francois. Charles consequently became heir apparent, the youngest in the world at five years old. Following the ceremony, the family appeared on the balcony of the Grand Ducal Palace.

== Guests at Trounwiessel ==
The following guests attended the Trounwiessel ("Changing of the Throne") events on 3 October 2025.

=== Grand Ducal Family ===
- Grand Duke Henri, the outgoing monarch; and his consort Grand Duchess Maria Teresa
  - Grand Duke Guillaume V, Henri's son, the new monarch; and his consort Grand Duchess Stéphanie
    - Prince Charles, Guillaume V's elder son and heir apparent
    - Prince François, Guillaume V's younger son
  - Prince Félix, Guillaume V's brother; and his wife Princess Claire
  - Prince Louis, Guillaume V's brother
  - Princess Alexandra, Guillaume V's sister; and her husband Nicolas Bagory
  - Prince Sébastien, Guillaume V's brother
- Archduchess Marie-Astrid, Henri's sister; and her husband Archduke Carl Christian of Austria
- Prince Jean, Henri's brother; and his wife Countess Diane of Nassau
- Princess Margaretha, Henri's sister; and her husband Prince Nikolaus of Liechtenstein
- Prince Guillaume, Henri's brother; and his wife Princess Sibilla of Luxembourg

=== Grand Ducal relatives ===
- Count Christian de Lannoy, Grand Duchess Stéphanie's brother; and his wife, Countess Luísa
- Countess Nathalie de Lannoy, Grand Duchess Stéphanie's sister; and her husband, John Hamilton

=== Foreign royalty ===
- (Belgium) Philippe and Mathilde, King and Queen of the Belgians
  - (Belgium) Princess Elisabeth, Duchess of Brabant
- Willem-Alexander and Máxima, King and Queen of the Netherlands
  - (Netherlands) Catharina-Amalia, Princess of Orange

=== Luxembourgish dignitaries ===
- Luc Frieden, Prime Minister of Luxembourg
  - Xavier Bettel, Deputy Prime Minister and former Prime Minister of Luxembourg (2013–2023)
  - Jean-Claude Juncker, former Prime Minister of Luxembourg (1995–2013)
  - Jacques Santer, former Prime Minister of Luxembourg (1984–1995)
- Claude Wiseler, President of the Chamber of Deputies
  - Jean Spautz, former President of the Chamber of Deputies (1995–2004)
  - Erna Hennicot-Schoepges, former President of the Chamber of Deputies (1989–1995)
- Lydie Polfer, Mayor of Luxembourg City
  - Colette Flesch, former Mayor of Luxembourg City (1969–1980)
- Members of the current Government
- Members of the Chamber of Deputies
- Members of the Luxembourg City Communal Council
- Luxembourgish Members of the European Parliament

=== Foreign dignitaries ===
- Frank-Walter Steinmeier, President of Germany, and Elke Büdenbender (present at gala dinner only)
- Emmanuel Macron, President of France, and Brigitte Macron (present at gala dinner only)
- (European Union) Roberta Metsola, President of the European Parliament, and Ukko Metsola
- (European Union) António Costa, President of the European Council

== Reactions ==
- China: Xi Jinping, General Secretary of the Chinese Communist Party and President of China, congratulated Grand Duke Guillaume on his enthronement, noting that "bilateral cooperation has produced fruitful outcomes in sectors including steel, finance and logistics".
- Denmark: King Frederik X and Queen Mary extended their "warmest congratulations" to the grand ducal couple.
- Morocco: King Mohammed VI congratulated Grand Duke Guillaume on his enthronement, adding: "I look forward to working with Your Royal Highness to strengthen the deep friendship and close cooperation between Our two countries".
- Norway: King Harald V extended his "warmest congratulations and best wishes" to Grand Duke Guillaume.
- Sweden: King Carl XVI Gustaf congratulated Grand Duke Guillaume on his accession to the throne in a telegram, which read: "In recent years I have highly valued our cooperation within the World Scout Foundation, in which you have followed in the footsteps of your grandfather, Grand Duke Jean. As you now succeed your father, Grand Duke Henri, as your nation's Head of State, I look forward to further deepening the ties between us and between our two countries."
- Vatican City: Pope Leo XIV sent his "sincere best wishes" to Grand Duke Guillaume on his accession, saying he joined "in the joy of an entire nation, rich in ancient and distinguished traditions deeply rooted in history."
