= Maria Teresa, Grand Duchess of Luxembourg =

Grand Duchess of Luxembourg from 2000 to 2025

María Teresa
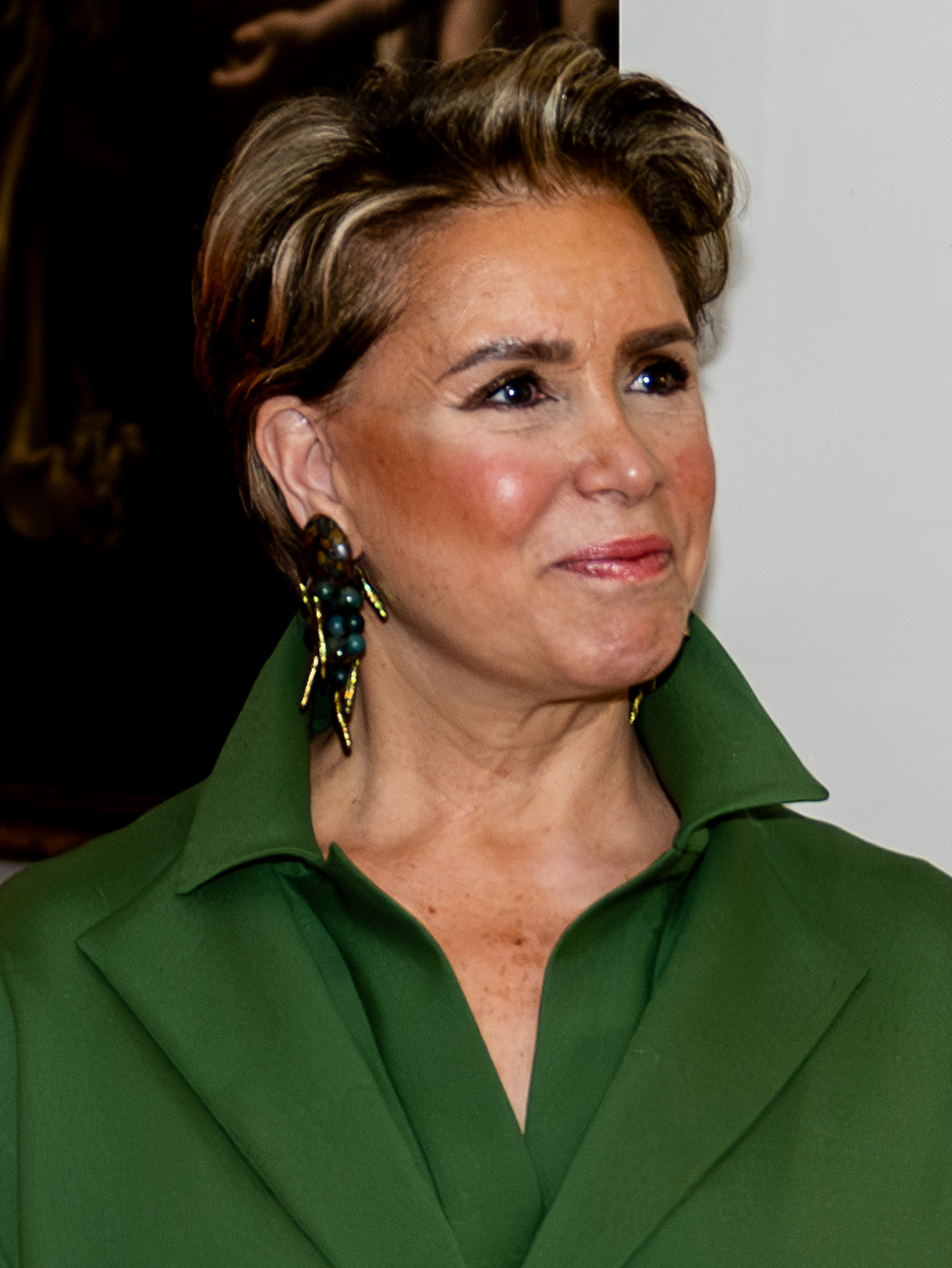
- Maria Teresa in 2024

Grand Duchess consort of Luxembourg
- Tenure: 7 October 2000 – 3 October 2025
- Born: María Teresa Mestre y Batista; 22 March 1956 (age 70); Marianao, Havana, Cuba
- Spouse: Henri, Grand Duke of Luxembourg (m. 1981)
- Issue: Guillaume V, Grand Duke of Luxembourg; Prince Félix; Prince Louis; Princess Alexandra; Prince Sébastien
- Father: José Antonio Mestre y Álvarez
- Mother: María Teresa Batista y Falla

Maria Teresa (born María Teresa Mestre y Batista; 22 March 1956) is a member of the grand ducal family of Luxembourg. She was Grand Duchess of Luxembourg as the wife of Grand Duke Henri from 2000 until her husband's abdication in 2025.

== Early life and education ==
Maria Teresa Mestre was born on 22 March 1956 in Marianao, Havana, Cuba, to José Antonio Mestre y Álvarez (1926–1993) and wife María Teresa Batista y Falla de Mestre (1928–1988), both from wealthy bourgeois families of Spanish descent. She is also the granddaughter of Agustín Batista y González de Mendoza (1899–1968), who was the major owner of the Trust Company of Cuba, the most powerful Cuban bank prior to the Cuban Revolution (founded in 1905).

In October 1959, at the time of the Cuban Revolution, Mestre's parents left Cuba with their children because the new government headed by Fidel Castro confiscated their properties. The family settled in New York City, where as a young girl Mestre was a pupil at Marymount School. From 1961 she carried on her studies at the Lycée Français de New York. In her childhood, Mestre took ballet and singing courses. She practiced skiing, ice-skating and water sports. She later lived in Santander, Spain, and in Geneva, Switzerland, where she became a Swiss citizen.

In 1980, Mestre graduated from the Graduate Institute of International and Development Studies in Geneva with a degree in political sciences. While studying there, she met her future husband Henri of Luxembourg.

== Marriage and children ==
On 14 February 1981, Maria Teresa married Henri of Luxembourg at the Notre-Dame Cathedral of Luxembourg. They have four sons and a daughter and eight grandchildren:

- Guillaume V (born on 11 November 1981 at the Grand Duchess Charlotte Maternity Hospital, Luxembourg City, Luxembourg). He succeed his father, Henri of Luxembourg as Grand duke of Luxembourg on 3 October 2025. He married Countess Stéphanie Marie Claudine Christine de Lannoy (born on 18 February 1984, Ronse, East Flanders, Belgium) on 20 October 2012. They have two sons:
  - Prince Charles Jean Philippe Joseph Marie Guillaume of Luxembourg (born on 10 May 2020 at the Grand Duchess Charlotte Maternity Hospital, Luxembourg City, Luxembourg).
  - Prince François Henri Louis Marie Guillaume of Luxembourg (born on 27 March 2023 at the Grand Duchess Charlotte Maternity Hospital, Luxembourg City, Luxembourg).
- Prince Félix Léopold Marie Guillaume of Luxembourg (born on 3 June 1984 at the Grand Duchess Charlotte Maternity Hospital, Luxembourg City, Luxembourg). He married Claire Margareta Lademacher (born on 21 March 1985, Filderstadt, Baden-Württemberg, West Germany) on 21 September 2013. They have two sons and one daughter:
  - Princess Amalia Gabriela Maria Teresa of Nassau (born on 15 June 2014 at the Grand Duchess Charlotte Maternity Hospital, Luxembourg City, Luxembourg).
  - Prince Liam Henri Hartmut of Nassau (born on 28 November 2016 at the Clinique Générale-Beaulieu in Geneva, Switzerland).
  - Prince Balthazar Félix Karl of Nassau (born on 7 January 2024 at the Grand Duchess Charlotte Maternity Hospital, Luxembourg City, Luxembourg).
- Prince Louis Xavier Marie Guillaume of Luxembourg, (born on 3 August 1986 at the Grand Duchess Charlotte Maternity Hospital, Luxembourg City, Luxembourg). He married Tessy Antony (born on 28 October 1985, Luxembourg City, Luxembourg) on 29 September 2006 and divorced on 4 April 2019. They have two sons:
  - Prince Gabriel Michael Louis Ronny of Nassau (born on 12 March 2006 at the Clinic des Grangettes, in Geneva, Switzerland).
  - Prince Noah Etienne Guillaume Gabriel Matthias Xavier of Nassau (born on 21 September 2007 at the Grand Duchess Charlotte Maternity Hospital, Luxembourg City, Luxembourg).
- Princess Alexandra Joséphine Teresa Charlotte Marie Wilhelmine of Luxembourg, (born on 16 February 1991 at the Grand Duchess Charlotte Maternity Hospital, Luxembourg City, Luxembourg). She married Nicolas Jacques Armel Bagory (born on 11 November 1988, Brittany, France) on 29 April 2023. They have a daughter and a son:
  - Victoire Bagory (born on 14 May 2024, in Paris, France).
  - Hélie Bagory (born on 17 October 2025).
- Prince Sébastien Henri Marie Guillaume of Luxembourg, (born on 16 April 1992 at the Grand Duchess Charlotte Maternity Hospital, Luxembourg City, Luxembourg).

== Grand Duchess of Luxembourg ==
Soon after her marriage, Maria Teresa and the then Hereditary Grand Duke Henri established The Prince Henri and Princess Maria Teresa Foundation to help those with special needs integrate fully into society. In 2001, she and her husband created The Grand Duke and Grand Duchess Foundation, launched upon the accession of the couple as the new Grand Duke and Duchess of Luxembourg. In 2004, the Grand Duke Henri and the Grand Duchess Maria Teresa Foundation was created after the merging of the two previous foundations.

In 2007, Maria Teresa was made a special ambassador for UNESCO, working to expand education for young girls and women and help to fight poverty.

Since 2005, Maria Teresa has been the chairwoman of the international jury of the European Microfinance Award, which annually awards holders of microfinance and inclusive finance initiatives in developing countries. Also, since 2006, Maria Teresa has been honorary president of the LuxFLAG (Luxembourg Fund Labeling Agency), the first agency to label responsible microfinance investment funds around the world. On 19 April 2007, the Grand Duchess was appointed UNICEF Eminent Advocate for Children, in which role she has visited Brazil (2007), China (2008), and Burundi (2009).

She is a member of the Honorary Board of the International Paralympic Committee and a patron of the Ligue Luxembourgeoise de Prévention et d’Action medico-sociales and SOS Villages d’Enfants Monde. The Grand Duchess and her husband Grand Duke Henri are the members of the Mentor Foundation (London), created under the patronage of the World Health Organization. She is also the president of the Luxembourg Red Cross and the Cancer Foundation. In 2016, she organized the first international forum on learning disabilities in Luxembourg.

The Grand Duchess supports the UNESCO “Breaking the Poverty Cycle of Women” project in Bangladesh, India, Nepal and Pakistan. The purpose of this project is to improve the living conditions of girls, women and their families. As honorary president of her own foundation, Grand Duchess Maria Teresa set up a project called Projet de la Main Tendue after visiting the Bujumbura prison in 2009 in Burundi. The purpose of this project is to liberate minor people from prison and to give them new opportunities for their future.

In October 2016, Maria Teresa accepted an invitation to join the Council of Patrons of the Asian University for Women (AUW) in Chittagong, Bangladesh. The university, established through partnerships between international foundations, including the Bill and Melinda Gates Foundation, Open Society Foundation, IKEA Foundation, as well as regional cooperation, serves women from multiple countries across Asia and the Middle East.

In 2019, Maria Teresa presented her initiative "Stand Speak Rise Up!" to end sexual violence in fragile environments, launched in cooperation with the Women’s Forum and with the support of the Luxembourg government. The conference is in partnership with the Dr. Denis Mukwege Foundation and We Are Not Weapons of War.

On 3 October 2025, Grand Duke Henri abdicated in favour of their son Guillaume V.

=== Royal household allegations ===
In 2020 the prime minister of Luxembourg commissioned a report from into the royal household following concerns over its working. The report found that up to one third of employees had left since 2015 and that "The most important decisions in the field of personnel management, whether at the level of recruitment, assignment to the various departments or even at the dismissal level are taken by HRH the Grand Duchess." Several newspaper reports at the time highlighted a 'culture of fear' around the Grand Duchess and "that no-one bar the Prime Minister dared confront her". The report also raised concerns about the use of public funds to pay for the Grand Duchess' personal website and that this had been prioritised over the Court's own official website. There were also allegations that staff at the Court have been subjected to physical abuse and these reports were investigated by the Luxembourg judicial police. In February 2023 it was reported by several Luxembourg based media outlets that the Grand Duchess had once again been accused of treating staff poorly during an outfit fitting in October 2022. The incident even involved the Prime Minister of Luxembourg having to speak to the Grand Duke and Grand Duchess about the treatment of the staff and commissioning a report into it.

== Honours ==
=== National honours ===
- Knight of the Order of the Gold Lion of the House of Nassau
- Grand Cross of the Order of Adolphe of Nassau

=== Foreign honours ===
- Austria: Grand Star of the Decoration of Honour for Services to the Republic of Austria
- Belgium: Grand Cordon of the Order of Leopold
- Brazil: Grand Cross of the Order of the Southern Cross
- Denmark: Knight of the Order of the Elephant
- Finland: Grand Cross of the Order of the White Rose of Finland
- France: Grand Cross of the Order of National Merit
- Greece: Grand Cross of the Order of Beneficence
- Italy: Knight Grand Cross of the Order of Merit of the Italian Republic
- Japan: Grand Cordon (Paulownia) of the Order of the Precious Crown
- Latvia: Commander Grand Cross of the Order of the Three Stars
- Netherlands:
  - Knight Grand Cross of the Order of the Netherlands Lion
  - Grand Cross of the Order of the Crown
- Norway: Grand Cross of the Order of Saint Olav
- (Kingdom of Portugal) Portuguese Royal Family: Dame Grand Cross of the Royal Order of Saint Isabel
- Portugal:
  - Grand Cross of the Order of Christ
  - Grand Cross of the Order of Saint James of the Sword
  - Grand Cross of the Order of Infante Henry
  - Grand Cross of the Order of Camões
- Romania: Grand Cross of the Order of the Star of Romania
- Spain: Dame Grand Cross of the Order of Charles III
- Sweden:
  - Member of the Royal Order of the Seraphim
  - Commander Grand Cross of the Royal Order of the Polar Star
  - Recipient of the 50th Birthday Badge Medal of King Carl XVI Gustaf

== Footnotes ==
Grand Duchess Maria Teresa Born: 22 March 1956
Luxembourgish royalty
Preceded by Princess Joséphine; Charlotte of Belgium	Grand Duchess consort of Luxembourg; 2000–2025	Succeeded by Countess Stéphanie de Lannoy
