= List of hospitals in Luxembourg =

This List of hospitals in Luxembourg shows the notable hospitals (French: Hôpitaux) and clinics (French: clinique) in Luxembourg.

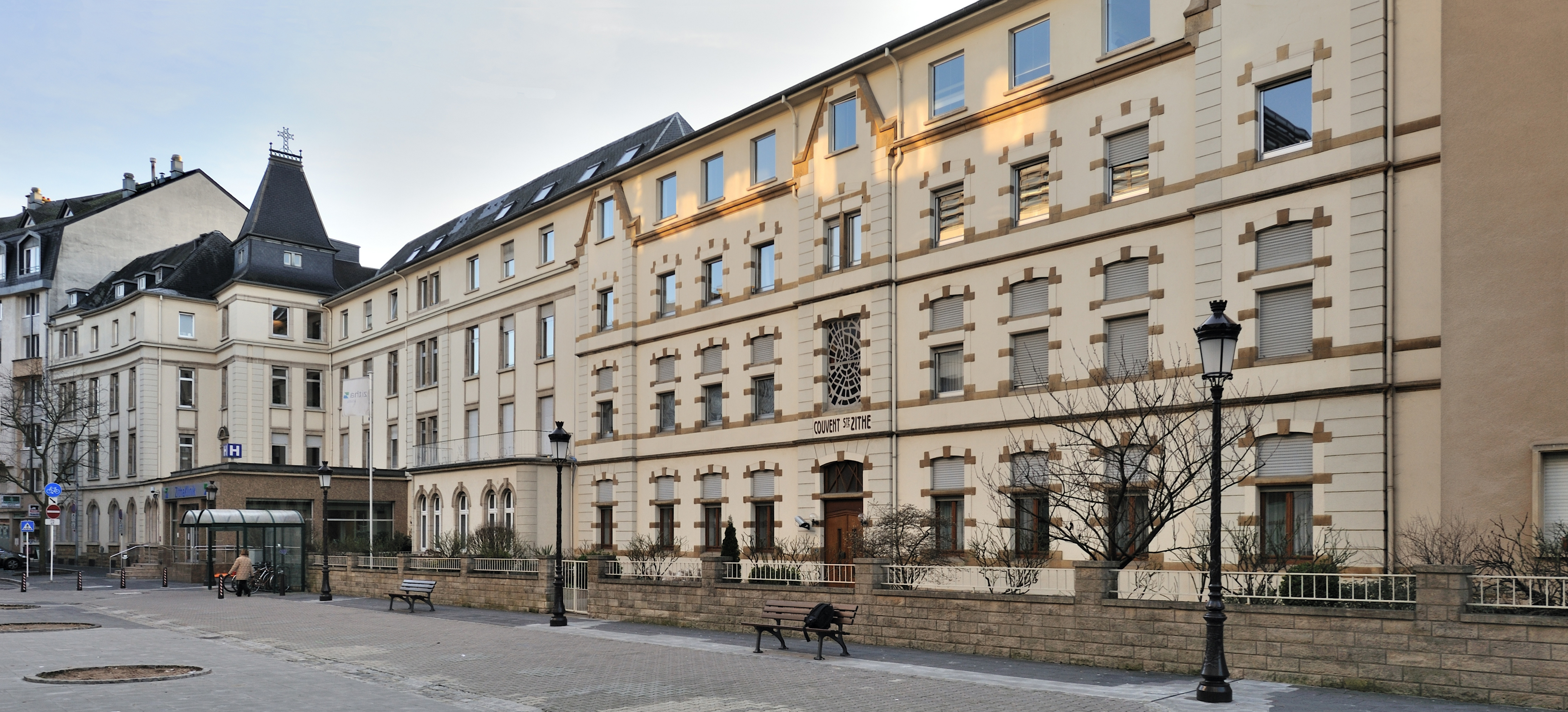
Zitha Clinic

1. Centre Hospitalier de Luxembourg (CHL)
  1. Municipal Hospital (Luxembourg), established in 1976
  2. CHL Pediatric Clinic
  3. CHL Maternity Grande-Duchesse Charlotte, established in 1936
  4. CHL Clinic d'Eich
2. Robert Schuman Hospitals, formed in 2014
  1. Hospital Kirchberg
  2. Clinique Bohler
  3. Zitha Clinic
  4. Clinic Sainte-Marie
3. Centre Hospitalier du Nord
  1. Clinique Regionale du Nord
4. Centre Hospitalier Emile Mayrisch
  1. Centre Hospitalier Emile Mayrisch, Hôpital Princesse Marie-Astrid, established in 1981
  2. Centre Hospitalier Emile Mayrisch, Hôpital de la Ville de Dudelange, first established in 1884
  3. Centre Hospitalier Emile Mayrisch, Centre Médical Clinique Sainte Marie
5. Hospital Intercommunal
6. Centre Hospitalier Neuro-Psychiatrique
7. Centre Thérapeutique Useldange
8. Centre Thérapeutique Manternach
9. Centre Thérapeutique Diekirch
10. Rehazenter (National Rehabilitation Centre)

The country's primary medical services are organized around four major hospital centers: the Centre Hospitalier de Luxembourg (CHL), the Centre Hospitalier du Nord (CHdN), the Centre Hospitalier Emile Mayrisch (CHEM), and the Hôpitaux Robert Schuman (HRS).

== See also ==
- Healthcare in Luxembourg
- History of hospitals
