= Princess Alexandra of Luxembourg =

Luxembourgish princess (born 1991)

Princess Alexandra
- Mrs. Bagory
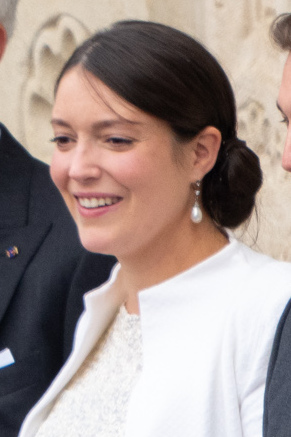
- Alexandra at her brother's enthronement in 2025
- Born: 16 February 1991 (age 35); Luxembourg City, Luxembourg
- Spouse: Nicolas Bagory (m. 2023)
- Issue: Victoire Bagory; Hélie Bagory
Names
- Alexandra Joséphine Teresa Charlotte Marie Wilhelmine
- House: Luxembourg-Nassau (official); Bourbon-Parma (agnatic)
- Father: Henri, Grand Duke of Luxembourg
- Mother: María Teresa Mestre y Batista

Princess Alexandra of Luxembourg (Alexandra Joséphine Teresa Charlotte Marie Wilhelmine; born 16 February 1991) is a member of the grand ducal family of Luxembourg and the fourth child and only daughter of Henri, Grand Duke of Luxembourg, and Maria Teresa, Grand Duchess of Luxembourg, and the younger sister of Grand Duke Guillaume V. Alexandra is also "Princess of Nassau" and "Princess of Bourbon-Parma". She is currently 7th in the line of succession.

== Early life and background ==
Princess Alexandra was born on 16 February 1991 at the Grand Duchess Charlotte Maternity Hospital in Luxembourg. She was raised in the Luxembourg countryside at Fischbach Castle, and later at Berg Castle, where her family moved upon her father's ascent to the Luxembourg throne.

Through her father, she is directly linked and related to many European royal families, which include; Belgium, the Netherlands, Sweden, Denmark, Austria, Liechtenstein, Portugal, and Spain. Her paternal great-grandfather was King Leopold III of Belgium, her great-grandmother was Princess Astrid of Sweden and the current King Philippe of Belgium is her first cousin once removed. Her paternal aunts are Archduchess Marie Astrid of Austria and Princess Margaretha of Liechtenstein. Her godparents are Archduchess Maria-Anna of Austria and Prince Michel of Ligne. Her siblings are: Grand Duke Guillaume V, Prince Félix, Prince Louis and Prince Sébastien. She is seventh in line of succession to the throne.

== Education and interests ==
She attended private schools in Luxembourg, primary school at the Angelsberg School and her secondary education at the Lycée Vauban. She received her baccalaureate with honors in Literature.

Alexandra pursued her university studies abroad in the United States at the private Catholic Franciscan University of Steubenville. After studying psychology and social sciences in the United States, she went on to continue her studies in Paris where she received a bachelor's degree in philosophy, with concentrations in ethics and anthropology. As of 2017, she holds a master's degree in inter-religious studies from the Irish School of Ecumenics with a specialization in Conflict Resolution.

She maintains a strong interest in politics and religion.

The Princess gained International Relations working experience while doing an internship at the Security Council at the United Nations in New York (when Luxembourg was a non-permanent member) where the Grand Duchy owns a historic mansion located at 17 Beekman Place in Manhattan named Luxembourg House, and also while working in journalism in the Middle East. She works as a volunteer helping refugees.

Princess Alexandra is fluent in Luxembourgish, French, English, Spanish, German, and Italian. She is passionate about literature and travel, by which she can discover new cultures and languages. She plays tennis regularly, enjoys alpine skiing and currently resides between Paris and Luxembourg. She vacations each summer with her family at their summer home on the French Riviera.

She has a rose variety named after her.

== Royal commitments and engagements ==
The Princess is an active working member of the Grand Ducal Royal Family. She attends official and royal functions where she is regularly seen using the Luxembourg Royal Family Jewel Collection representing her country such as Luxembourg's New Year celebrations at the Grand Ducal Palace, representing Luxembourg at the Olympics, receiving foreign state visitors, representing Luxembourg on state visits abroad, official visits to the Vatican, royal weddings, funerals, and art events.

In May 2017, she received and hosted Catherine, Duchess of Cambridge, on her visit to Luxembourg. And in November 2017, with her Father the Grand Duke of Luxembourg, she represented Luxembourg on an official state visit to Japan being hosted by Emperor Akihito and Empress Michiko of Japan.

As a child on an official state visit to the Vatican in 2003, as a Royal Princess of Luxembourg using her Privilège du blanc permission, she dressed in white in the presence of Pope John Paul II.

She has been granted High Patronage to the Foundations of Lëtzebuerger Déiereschutzliga and the Lëtzebuerger Blannevereenegung.

== Personal life ==
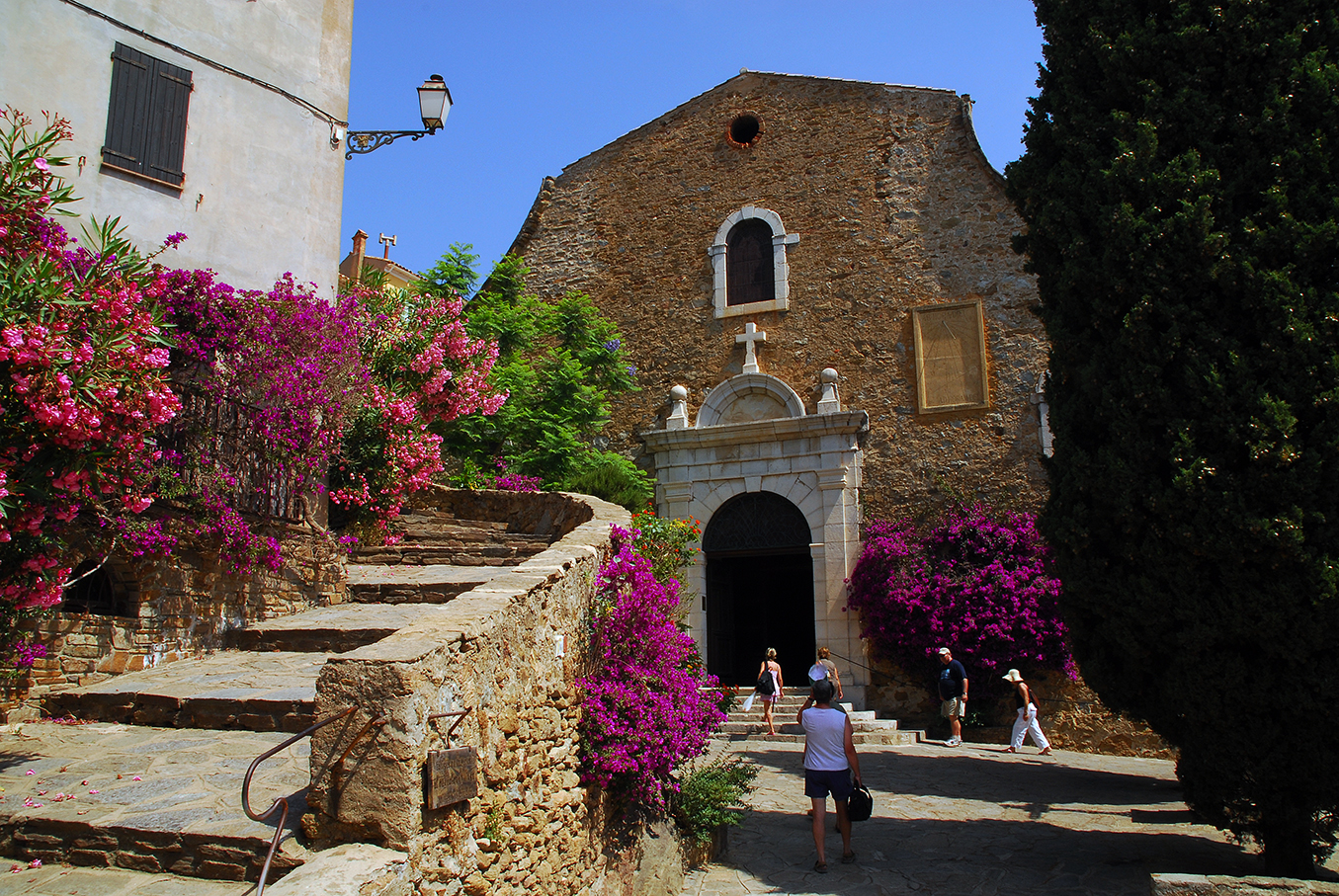
Saint Trophyme Church

The Grand Ducal Court of Luxembourg announced the engagement of Princess Alexandra to Nicolas Jacques Armel Bagory (b. 11 November 1988) on 7 November 2022. He is the son of Thomas Bagory by his wife, Gwenaëlle Podeur. A civil wedding ceremony in Luxembourg City took place on 22 April 2023. It was followed by a religious ceremony at Saint Trophyme Church in Bormes-les-Mimosas, Var, France, on 29 April. Their daughter Victoire was born in Paris on 14 May 2024. Their son Hélie was born on 17 October 2025.

== Line of succession ==
Alexandra is currently seventh in line of succession to the throne. She had previously been excluded from birth until 2011, when her father issued absolute primogeniture in respect to his daughter Princess Alexandra and all of Grand Duke Henri's female descendants equal rights to males to the line of succession to the Luxembourg throne. Her brother, Prince Louis, gave up his place in the line of succession when he married Tessy Antony in a morganatic marriage.

== Honours ==
=== National ===
- Knight of the Order of the Gold Lion of the House of Nassau
- Knight Grand Cross of the Order of Adolphe of Nassau

=== Foreign ===
- Japan: Grand Cordon of the Order of the Precious Crown

== Notes ==
Princess Alexandra of Luxembourg House of Luxembourg-Nassau Cadet branch of the House of Nassau Born: 16 February 1991
Lines of succession
Preceded by Prince Balthasar of Nassau	Succession to the Luxembourger throne 7th in line	Followed by Victoire de Nassau Bagory
