= Prince Felix =

Prince Felix may refer to:

- Prince Felix of Schwarzenberg (1800–1852), an statesman who saved the Austrian Empire and son of Prince Joseph II
- Felix Yussupov (1887–1967), one of the murderers of Grigory Rasputin
- Prince Felix of Bourbon-Parma (1893–1970), husband of Grand Duchess Charlotte of Luxembourg
- Prince Félix of Luxembourg (born 1984), son of Grand Duke Henri of Luxembourg
- Count Felix of Monpezat (born 2002), son of Prince Joachim of Denmark
