= Grand Duchess Charlotte Maternity Hospital =

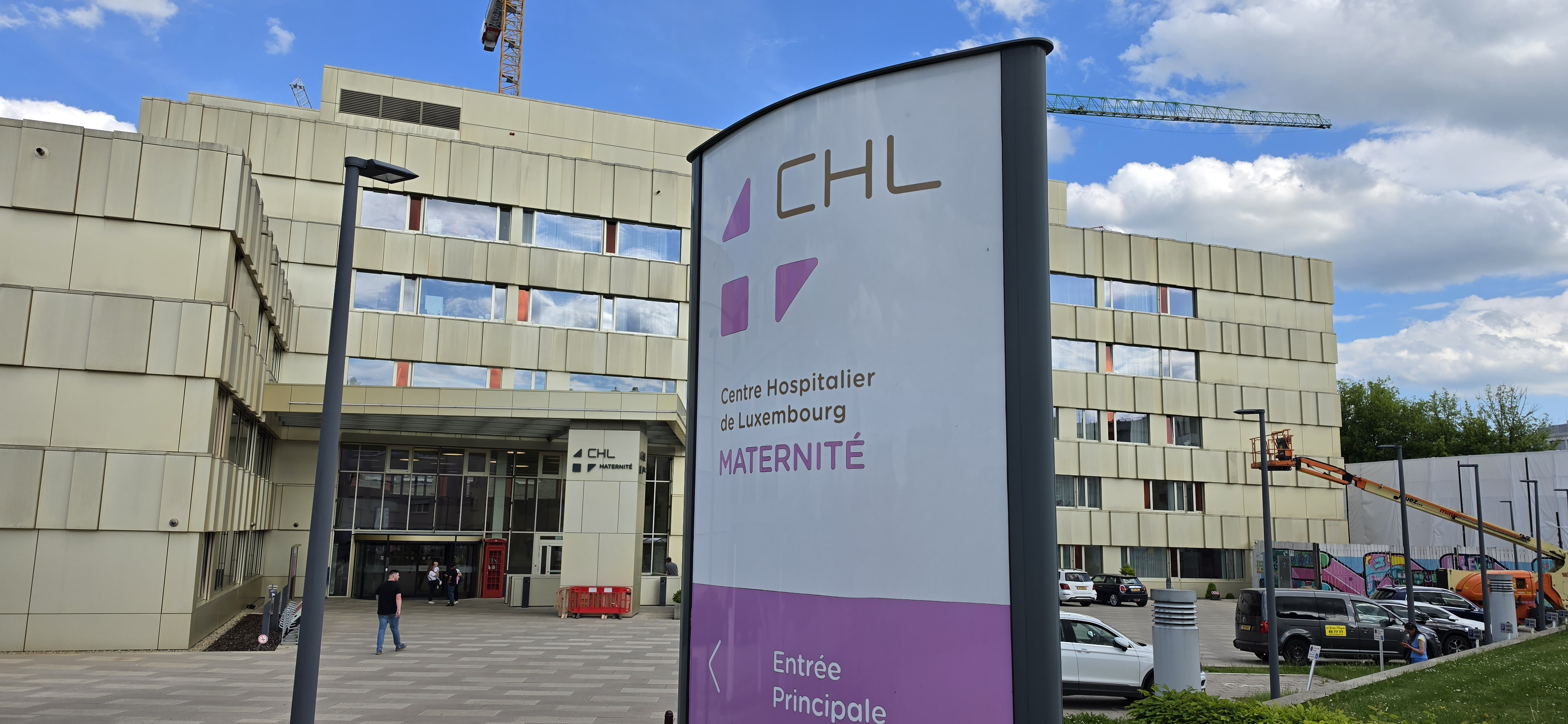

Geography
- Location: Luxembourg
- Coordinates: 49°37′02.9″N 6°05′57.2″E

Organisation
- Care system: Public
- Type: Specialist

History
- Opened: 1936

Links
- Website: www.chl.lu/maternite/
- Lists: Hospitals in Luxembourg

The Grand Duchess Charlotte Maternity Hospital (French: Maternité Grande-Duchesse Charlotte) is a maternity hospital, part of the Centre Hospitalier de Luxembourg in Luxembourg. The hospital is named after Charlotte, Grand Duchess of Luxembourg, who reigned from 1919 to 1964.

== History ==
In 1936 the development of a maternity hospital in Luxembourg went under the leadership of the Red Cross director Dr. M. Bohler and the school of the state of Pfaffenthal, under the control of the state, with the first director Dr. Richard.

During World War II the hospital was under control of the state, under the direction of Dr. M. Reile.

In 1951 the first incubator was introduced at the hospital. Between 1952 and 1966 the unit of medical gymnastics for childbirth and the gynecology department were opened.

On December 10, 1975, together with the Pediatric Clinic and the Municipal Hospital the Centre Hospitalier de Luxembourg was formed.

More recently, the hospital was the birthplace of Prince Balthazar Félix Karl of Nassau, the third child of Prince Félix and Princess Claire, on 7 January 2024.

== Famous births ==
- 11 November 1981 - Guillaume V, Grand Duke of Luxembourg, son of Grand Duke Henri and Grand Duchess Maria Theresa
- 3 June 1984 - Prince Félix, son of Grand Duke Henri and Grand Duchess Maria Theresa
- 3 August 1986 - Prince Louis, son of Grand Duke Henri and Grand Duchess Maria Theresa
- 16 February 1991 - Princess Alexandra, daughter of Grand Duke Henri and Grand Duchess Maria Theresa
- 16 April 1992 - Prince Sébastien, son of Grand Duke Henri and Grand Duchess Maria Theresa
- 21 September 2007 - Prince Noah, son of Prince Louis and Princess Tessy
- 15 June 2014 - Princess Amalia, daughter of Prince Félix and Princess Claire
- 10 May 2020 - Prince Charles, son of Grand Duke Guillaume and Grand Duchess Stéphanie
- 27 March 2023 - Prince François, son of Grand Duke Guillaume and Grand Duchess Stéphanie
- 7 January 2024 - Prince Balthasar, son of Prince Félix and Princess Claire

== See also ==
- Centre Hospitalier de Luxembourg
- Municipal Hospital
