= Succession to the Luxembourgish throne =

Head of state succession

Since 2011, the crown of Luxembourg descends according to absolute primogeniture among Grand Duchess Charlotte’s descendants and according to agnatic primogeniture among other dynasts.

== Line of succession ==
- Grand Duchess Charlotte (1896–1985)
  - Grand Duke Jean (1921–2019)
    - Grand Duke Henri (born 1955)
      - Grand Duke Guillaume V (born 1981)
        - (1) Prince Charles (b. 2020)
        - (2) Prince François (b. 2023)
      - (3) Prince Félix (b. 1984)
        - (4) Princess Amalia of Nassau (b. 2014)
        - (5) Prince Liam of Nassau (b. 2016)
        - (6) Prince Balthazar of Nassau (b. 2024)
      - (7) Princess Alexandra (b. 1991)
        - (8) Victoire Bagory (b. 2024)
        - (9) Hélie Bagory (b. 2025)
      - (10) Prince Sébastien (b. 1992)
    - (11) Prince Guillaume (b. 1963)
      - (12) Prince Paul Louis of Nassau (b. 1998)
      - (13) Prince Léopold of Nassau (b. 2000)
      - (14) Prince Jean André of Nassau (b. 2004)
  - Prince Charles (1927–1977)
    - (15) Prince Robert (b. 1968)
      - (16) Prince Alexandre of Nassau (b. 1997)

== Succession law ==
=== History ===
The constitution of Luxembourg states that the crown is hereditary in the house of Nassau according to the pact of 1783 (the Nassau Family Pact), the Treaty of Vienna made in 1815, and the Treaty of London of 1867.

In April 1907 Grand Duke Guillaume IV decreed (approved in July 1907 by legislature of Luxembourg and thereafter enacted) amendments to the House law of Nassau: the Grand Duke's eldest daughter would succeed (that provision is identical with the effect of the 1783 pact), and after her, her issue in male line born of marriages that abide by the house laws; in default thereof, the Grand Duke's next daughters in similar fashion. Thus, issue of the Grand Duke's daughters received succession rights only in strict agnatic line - a male-line male descendant of a younger daughter would have had preference over female descendants of elder daughters. This law of succession in Luxembourg followed a special order among male lines issued from Grand Duke Guillaume IV's daughters.

The 1907 amendments to the house law bypassed the Counts of Merenberg, male-line descendants of the House of Nassau. While the Merenberg line had a male heir in the person of Georg Nikolaus, Count von Merenberg (1871–1948), the count was born of a morganatic marriage between Grand Duke William IV's uncle, Prince Nikolaus Wilhelm of Nassau, and Natalia Pushkina (daughter of Russian author Alexander Pushkin, a member of the untitled Russian nobility). The count's claim to be recognized as the heir to the Grand Duchy was dismissed on the grounds that he and his branch were non-dynastic despite his marriage to Princess Olga Alexandrovna Yurievskaya, a morganatic daughter of Tsar Alexander II of Russia. The Merenberg line eventually also ran out of male heirs; the last surviving male-line descendant is Countess Clotilde von Merenberg, third cousin once removed of Grand Duke Henri.

Prince Jean of Luxembourg, second son of Grand Duke Jean, renounced his right of succession for himself and his heirs on 26 September 1986. Prince Louis of Luxembourg, third son of Grand Duke Henri, renounced his right of succession for himself and his heirs upon his marriage in 2006.

An heir apparent may be granted the style "hereditary grand duke" once they reach the age of eighteen.

=== Absolute primogeniture ===
The preference for men over women in succession to Luxembourg's throne was abandoned in favour of absolute primogeniture on 20 June 2011 by decree of Grand Duke Henri. Henceforth, any legitimate female descendant of the House of Luxembourg-Nassau born of authorized marriage shall inherit the throne by order of seniority of line of descent and of birth as stipulated in Article 3 of the Constitution and the Nassau Family Pact without regard to gender, applicable first to succession by the descendants of Grand Duke Henri. The Grand Duke's Marshal issued an addendum to the decree explaining the context of the change: pursuant to the United Nations' 1979 call for nations to eliminate all forms of discrimination against women, in 2008 the Grand Duchy dropped the exception to gender non-discrimination it had declared in the matter of the grand ducal succession.
