= Prince Charles of Luxembourg (born 2020) =

Heir apparent to the Luxembourgish throne

Prince Charles
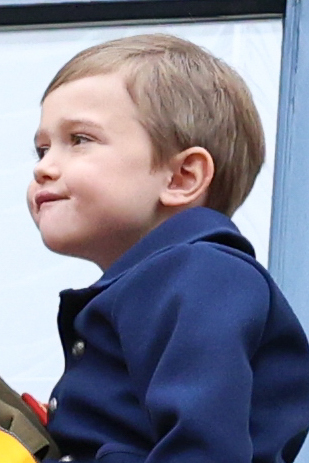
- Charles in 2025
- Born: 10 May 2020 (age 6); Grand Duchess Charlotte Maternity Hospital, Luxembourg City, Luxembourg
Names
- Charles Jean Philippe Joseph Marie Guillaume
- House: Luxembourg-Nassau (official); Bourbon-Parma (agnatic)
- Father: Guillaume V, Grand Duke of Luxembourg
- Mother: Stéphanie de Lannoy

Prince Charles of Luxembourg (Charles Jean Philippe Joseph Marie Guillaume; born 10 May 2020) is the heir apparent to the Luxembourgish throne as the elder child and son of Grand Duke Guillaume V and Grand Duchess Stéphanie.

== Early life ==
He was born at Grand Duchess Charlotte Maternity Hospital in Luxembourg City during the reign of his paternal grandfather Grand Duke Henri. His birth was celebrated by a 21-gun salute at Fort Thüngen in Kirchberg.

On 19 September 2020, Prince Charles was baptised at the Abbey of St. Maurice and St. Maurus of Clervaux in Luxembourg. His godparents are his maternal aunt Countess Gaëlle de Lannoy and his paternal uncle Prince Louis of Luxembourg.

Charles was joined by a brother, Prince François, on 27 March 2023.

== Heir apparent ==
On 3 October 2025, Charles became heir apparent in line with his grandfather's abdication and the accession of his father as Grand Duke of Luxembourg. Although he is first in the line of succession, he is due to receive the title of Hereditary Grand Duke only upon reaching the age of 18 on 10 May 2038.

Prince Charles of Luxembourg (born 2020) House of Luxembourg-Nassau Born: 10 May 2020
Lines of succession
| First Heir apparent | Succession to the Luxembourgish throne 1st in line | Succeeded by Prince François of Luxembourg |
