= Prince Guillaume of Luxembourg =

Luxembourgish prince (born 1963)

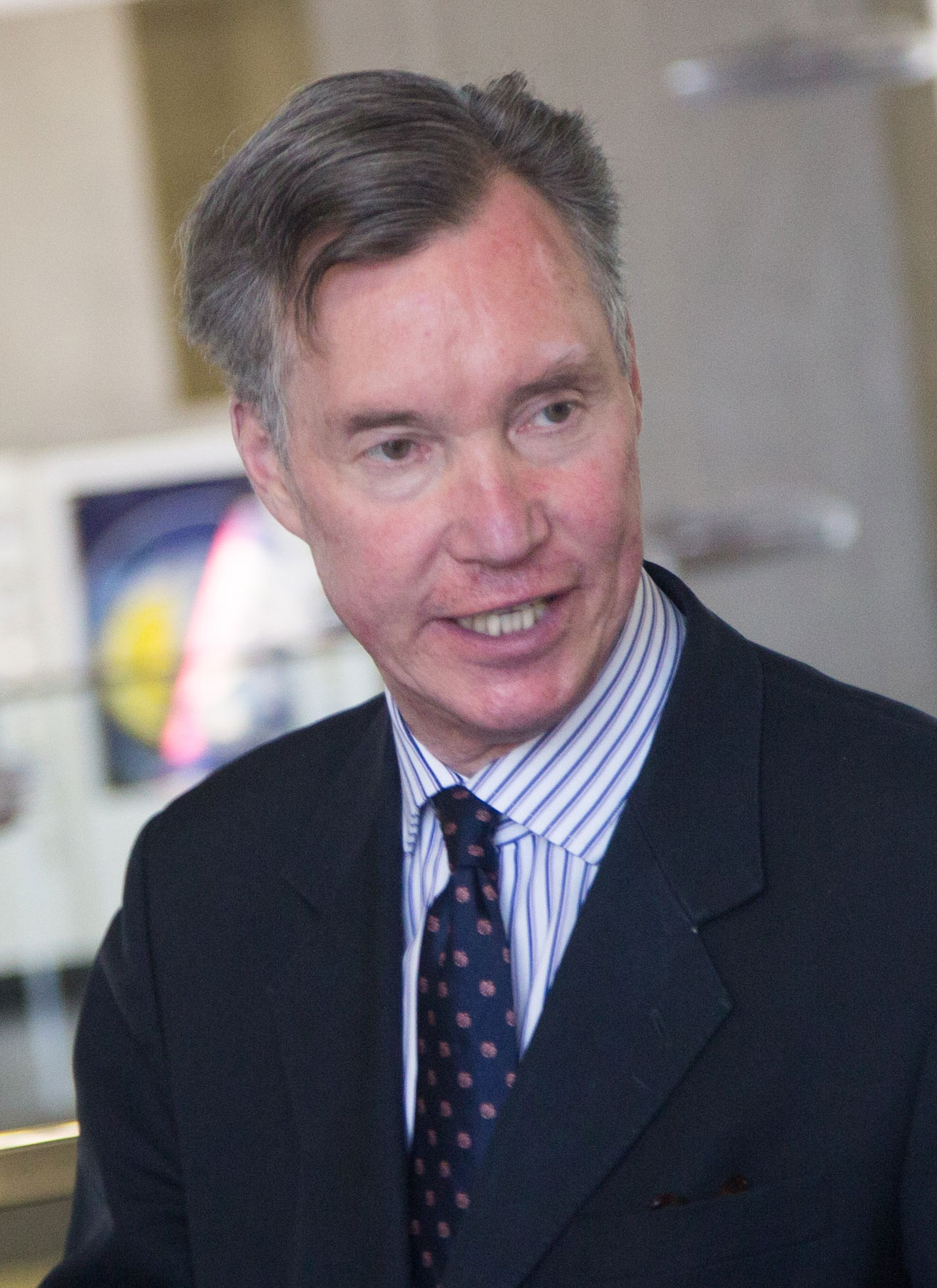
- Prince Guillaume in 2015
- Born: 1 May 1963 (age 63); Betzdorf Castle, Betzdorf, Luxembourg
- Spouse: Sibilla Sandra Weiller (m. 1994)
- Issue: Prince Paul Louis of Nassau; Prince Léopold of Nassau; Princess Charlotte of Nassau; Prince Jean of Nassau
Names
- Guillaume Marie Louis Christian
- House: Nassau-Weilburg (official); Bourbon-Parma (agnatic)
- Father: Jean, Grand Duke of Luxembourg
- Mother: Princess Joséphine Charlotte of Belgium

Prince Guillaume of Luxembourg (Guillaume Marie Louis Christian; born 1 May 1963) is the third son and youngest child of Grand Duke Jean and Grand Duchess Josephine-Charlotte of Luxembourg. He is currently 11th in the line of succession to the Luxembourgish throne.

== Life ==
Prince Guillaume was born in Betzdorf Castle. He attended secondary school in Luxembourg and Switzerland, and received his baccalaureate in Grenoble in 1982. He continued his studies at the University of Oxford in the United Kingdom, and later at Georgetown University in Washington, D.C., where he graduated in 1987. Guillaume was presented the degree Doctor of Humane Letters, honoris causa, at Sacred Heart University's Academic Convocation and Induction of the Class of 2011 on 10 September 2007. The official ceremony welcomed the first-year students to SHU with a formal academic procession and messages from the faculty, student representatives, and president Anthony J. Cernera, PhD.

Guillaume worked for six months at the International Monetary Fund in Washington, and spent two years working for the Commission of the European Communities in Brussels. He is currently a director of ArcelorMittal.

On the night of 10 to 11 September 2000, Prince Guillaume and Princess Sibilla were involved in a serious car accident near Paris. Guillaume was in a coma for almost a month. The transfer of the throne between his father Grand Duke Jean and his brother Henri was postponed from 28 September to 7 October.

== Marriage and children ==
Prince Guillaume married Sibilla Sandra Weiller y Torlonia (b. 12 June 1968, Neuilly-sur-Seine, France), the second child of French industrialist and patron of the Arts Paul-Annik Weiller (son of Paul-Louis Weiller and Aliki, Lady Russell) and Italian noblewoman Donna Olimpia Torlonia di Civitella-Cesi (daughter of Alessandro Torlonia, 5th Prince of Civitella-Cesi and Infanta Beatriz of Spain, also descendant of Queen Victoria of the United Kingdom) and the second cousin of King Felipe VI of Spain civilly in Sélestat on 8 September 1994 and religiously at Versailles Cathedral on 24 September 1994, who received the title "Princess of Luxembourg". Guillaume and Sibilla have four children:

- Prince Paul-Louis Jean Marie Guillaume de Nassau (b. 4 March 1998, Luxembourg).
- Prince Léopold Guillaume Marie Joseph de Nassau (b. 2 May 2000, Luxembourg). Twin of Princess Charlotte.
- Princess Charlotte Wilhelmine Maria da Gloria de Nassau (b. 2 May 2000, Luxembourg). Twin of Prince Léopold.
- Prince Jean André Guillaume Marie Gabriel Marc d'Aviano de Nassau (b. 13 July 2004, Luxembourg).

Their sons are in the line of succession to the throne of Luxembourg.

Prince Guillaume is godfather to his nephew, Guillaume V, Grand Duke of Luxembourg. He is also one of the godparents of Prince Achileas-Andreas of Greece and Denmark, the second son of Pavlos, Crown Prince of Greece.

== Honours ==
=== National ===
- Luxembourg: Knight of the Order of the Gold Lion of the House of Nassau
- Luxembourg: Knight Grand Cross of the Order of Adolphe of Nassau

=== Foreign ===
- (Albanian Kingdom (1928–1939)) Albanian Royal Family: Knight Grand Cross of the Royal Order of Skanderbeg
- Belgium: Knight Grand Cross of the Order of the Crown
- Spain: Knight Grand Cross of the Order of Isabella the Catholic
- Sweden: Knight Grand Cross of the Order of the Polar Star

Prince Guillaume of Luxembourg House of Nassau-Weilburg Cadet branch of the House of Nassau Born: 1 May 1963
Preceded by Prince Sébastien of Luxembourg	Succession to the Luxembourger throne 11th position	Followed by Prince Paul Louis of Nassau
