= Prince Sébastien of Luxembourg =

Luxembourgish prince (born 1992)

Prince Sébastien
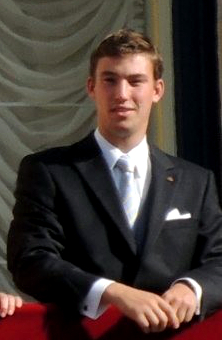
- Prince Sébastien in 2012
- Born: 16 April 1992 (age 34); Grand Duchess Charlotte Maternity Hospital, Luxembourg City, Luxembourg
Names
- Sébastien Henri Marie Guillaume
- House: Luxembourg-Nassau (official); Bourbon-Parma (agnatic)
- Father: Henri, Grand Duke of Luxembourg
- Mother: María Teresa Mestre y Batista

Prince Sébastien of Luxembourg (Sébastien Henri Marie Guillaume; born 16 April 1992) is a member of the grand ducal family of Luxembourg and the fifth and youngest child of Henri, Grand Duke of Luxembourg and Maria Teresa, Grand Duchess of Luxembourg, and the younger brother of Grand Duke Guillaume V.

Prince Sébastien has four siblings: Guillaume, Prince Félix, Prince Louis and Princess Alexandra. He is currently 10th in the line of succession.

He is fluent in Luxembourgish, French, English, German and has some knowledge of Spanish.

== Life ==
Prince Sébastien was born on 16 April 1992 at Grand Duchess Charlotte Maternity Hospital in Luxembourg City. He is fifth and youngest child of Henri, Grand Duke of Luxembourg and Maria Teresa, Grand Duchess of Luxembourg. The Prince was born on his father's 37th birthday.

He attended various schools, including Sunningdale School and Summer Fields School, Le Rosey, St. George's International School Luxembourg, Ampleforth College and International School of Luxembourg before receiving his college education in Marketing and International Business at Franciscan University of Steubenville in Ohio. While at Steubenville, Prince Sébastien was a member of the school's renowned rugby program, and Sébastien received accolades for his sportsmanship. He graduated in May 2015. In September 2016, he began a 44-week officer training course at the Royal Military Academy Sandhurst. He graduated in August 2017 and qualified as an Officer Cadet following his training. On 4 September 2017, he took the oath as an officer of the Luxembourg Army. He is currently serving as a platoon commander in the 1st Bn Irish Guards.

== Patronage ==
Prince Sébastien is a patron of the Luxembourg Federation of Swimming and Rescue (FLNS).

== Honours and awards ==
- Luxembourg:
  - Knight of the Order of the Gold Lion of the House of Nassau (by birth)
  - Grand Cross of Order of Adolphe of Nassau (by birth, on 18 years old)

== Notes ==
Prince Sébastien of Luxembourg House of Luxembourg-Nassau Born: 16 April 1992
Lines of succession
Preceded by Hélie Bagory	Succession to the Luxembourger throne 10th in line	Followed by Prince Guillaume
