= Prince Félix of Luxembourg =

Luxembourgish prince (born 1984)

Prince Félix
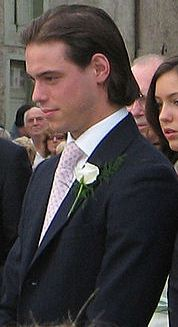
- Félix in 2006
- Born: 3 June 1984 (age 42); Grand Duchess Charlotte Maternity Hospital, Luxembourg City, Luxembourg
- Spouse: Claire Lademacher (m. 2013)
- Issue: Princess Amalia of Nassau; Prince Liam of Nassau; Prince Balthazar of Nassau
Names
- Félix Léopold Marie Guillaume
- House: Luxembourg-Nassau (official); Bourbon-Parma (agnatic)
- Father: Henri, Grand Duke of Luxembourg
- Mother: María Teresa Mestre y Batista

Prince Félix of Luxembourg, (Félix Léopold Marie Guillaume; born 3 June 1984) is a member of the grand ducal family of Luxembourg and the second son of Henri, Grand Duke of Luxembourg, and Maria Teresa, Grand Duchess of Luxembourg. He is currently third in the line of succession to the throne of Luxembourg.

== Biography ==
Prince Félix was born on 3 June 1984 in the Grand Duchess Charlotte Maternity Hospital in the Grand Duchy of Luxembourg. He is the second of the five children of Grand Duke Henri and Grand Duchess Maria Teresa, the others being: Grand Duke Guillaume V, Prince Louis, Princess Alexandra and Prince Sébastien. His godparents are Prince Jean and Catalina Mestre. He was named after his great-grandfather, Prince Felix of Bourbon-Parma.

Prince Félix attended primary school at Lorentzweiler before attending a private school for his secondary education called Notre Dame Sainte-Sophie of Luxembourg then at the American School of Luxembourg. In 1998, he went to the Swiss boarding school Collège Alpin International Beau Soleil in Villars-sur-Ollon. During his time at the boarding school, he would encounter his future spouse. In 2003, he graduated from secondary school with honours and joined the Royal Military Academy Sandhurst in the United Kingdom. However before graduating, he had to quit because of health reasons surrounding a knee injury.

Between 2003 and 2004, Prince Félix took interest in different fields of study such as political science, psychology and communication, leading him to attend schools in England and Belgium. He has also completed courses at various companies in order to obtain additional professional experience.

In 2005, Prince Félix joined the Marketing and Public Relations department of Grand Chelem Management SA, a Swiss company specializing in the organisation of sporting and cultural events. He continues to work as an independent consultant for the company. The prince takes a particular interest in ethics in biotechnology. In June 2009, the Grand Ducal Court announced later that October, Prince Félix would begin a bachelor's degree in bioethics at the Pontifical Athenaeum Regina Apostolorum in Rome, Italy, completing it in 2013.

In 2013, the Prince married Claire Lademacher and together they have been managing Château Les Crostes - a wine estate in Lorgues in France - since October 2013. In 2016, he became the president of Lorgues Terre de Vins association, who have the goal of promoting the town as a tourist and wine destination. Also in 2016 Félix, Claire and some friends created the Young Empire company which is a clothing, furniture and homeware brand for children.

In addition to Luxembourgish, French, German, he is fluent in English and Italian. He has basic understanding in Spanish.

== Personal interests ==
In 2003, he accepted the patronage of the sports association paratrooper "Cercle Para Luxembourg" (FAL). A fan of basketball, he was appointed honorary president of the "Federation Luxembourg Basketball" in 2005.

Since 2016, Prince Félix chairs the Lorgues Terre de Vins association, whose goal is to make their community an unmissable destination in Provence.

== Marriage and children ==
On 13 December 2012, the Grand Ducal household confirmed Prince Félix's engagement to Claire Lademacher. The civil wedding took place on 17 September 2013 in Königstein im Taunus, followed by a religious ceremony on 21 September in the Basilica of Sainte Marie-Madeleine in Saint-Maximin-la-Sainte-Baume, France. Since the wedding, the couple have been living in the south of France at the Château Les Crostes, a winery in Lorgues that has been owned by the Lademacher family for many years.

Prince Félix and Princess Claire's daughter, Princess Amalia Gabriela Maria Theresa, was born on 15 June 2014 at the Grand Duchess Charlotte Maternity Hospital in Luxembourg. A son, Prince Liam Henri Hartmut, was born at Beaulieu General Clinic in Geneva on 28 November 2016. Claire gave birth to their second son, Prince Balthazar Félix Karl of Nassau, on 7 January 2024 at the Grand Duchess Charlotte Maternity Hospital in Luxembourg.

== Honours and awards ==
=== National honours ===
- Knight of the Order of the Gold Lion of the House of Nassau
- Knight Grand Cross of Order of Adolphe of Nassau

== Notes ==
Prince Félix of Luxembourg House of Luxembourg-Nassau Born: 3 June 1984
Lines of succession
Preceded by Prince François of Luxembourg	Succession to the Luxembourger throne 3rd in line	Followed by Princess Amalia of Nassau
