= Centre Hospitalier de Luxembourg =

Hospital in Luxembourg City

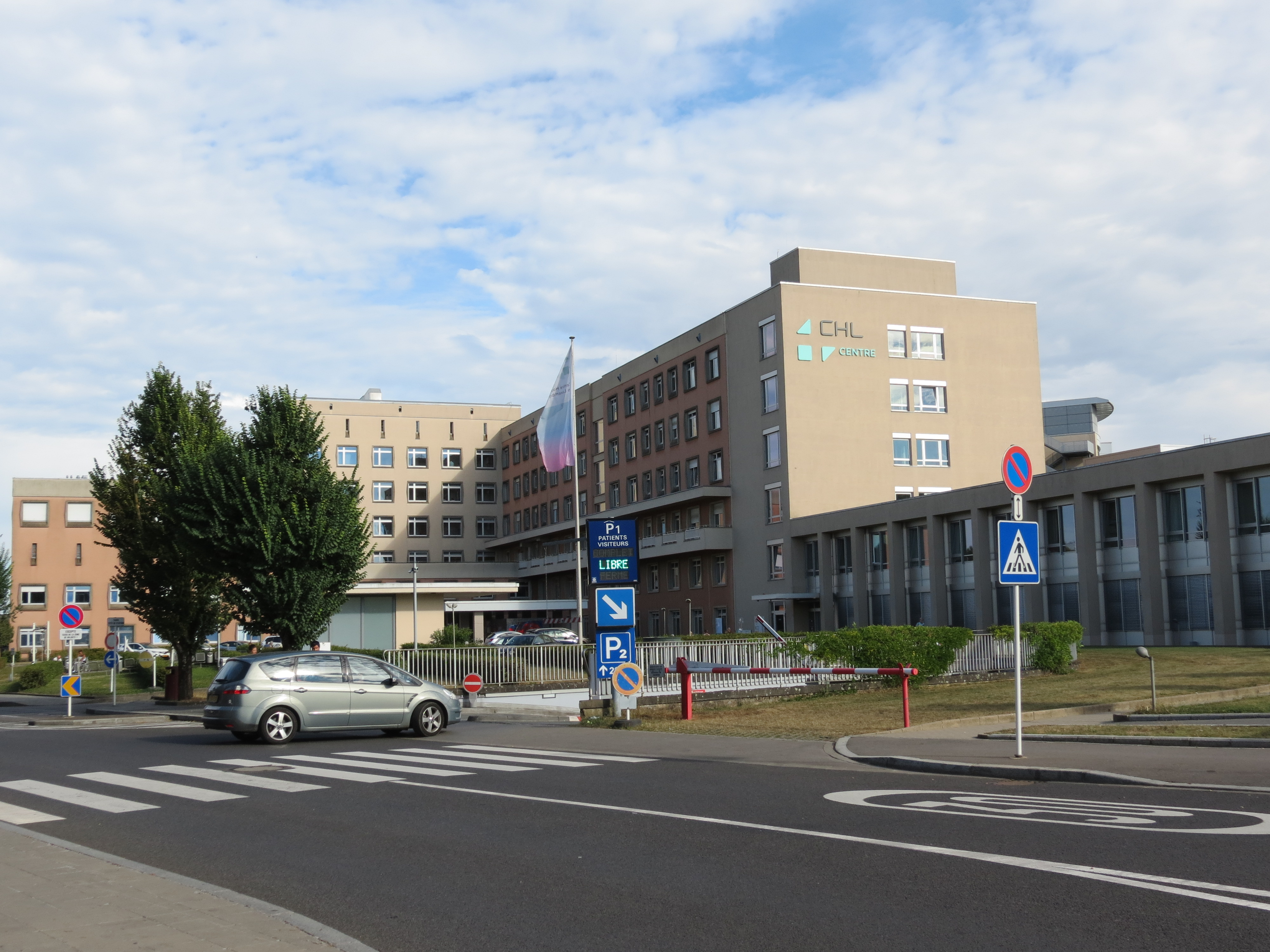
- Centre hospitalier de Luxembourg (CHL)

Organisation
- Type: General and acute care

Services
- Emergency department: Urgences
- Beds: 579 (08/2009)

Helipads
- Helipad: Yes (ICAO: ELLC)

History
- Opened: 10 December 1975 (50 years ago)

Links
- Website: https://www.chl.lu/

Centre Hospitalier de Luxembourg (CHL), is the public healthcare provider for Luxembourg City, in southern Luxembourg. It is a government-owned corporation, established by law on 10 December 1975 (50 years ago). This law unified the Grand Duchess Charlotte maternity ward, the Grand Duke Jean and Grand Duchess Joséphine-Charlotte Foundation pediatric clinic and the Municipal Hospital under one organisation.

== Hospitals ==
The main site of CHL is located to the west of the city centre, in the south-east of the district of Rollingergrund-North Belair, and just to the north of Route d'Arlon. This site comprises three of CHL's four institutions:

- CHL Centre: Municipal Hospital, a general hospital
- CHL Maternité: Grand Duchess Charlotte Maternity Hospital, a maternity hospital
- CHL KannerKlinik: A pediatric clinic

On 3 October 2003 CHL Eich was added as the fourth hospital within CHL, it serves as a general clinic in Eich.

On 29 April 2022, it was announced that plans had been made for the construction of a New CHL Centre in an effort to modernise and consolidate the 2 sites. The project is projected to be completed by the end of 2028.
