= Prince Louis of Luxembourg =

Luxembourgish prince (born 1986)

Prince Louis
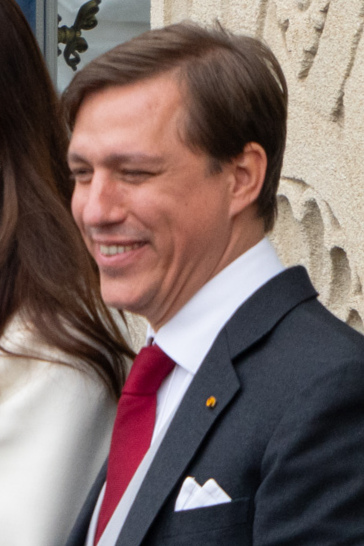
- Louis at his brother's enthronment in 2025
- Born: 3 August 1986 (age 40); Grand Duchess Charlotte Maternity Hospital, Luxembourg City, Luxembourg
- Spouse: Tessy Antony (m. 2006; div. 2019)
- Issue: Prince Gabriel of Nassau; Prince Noah of Nassau
Names
- Louis Xavier Marie Guillaume
- House: Luxembourg-Nassau (official); Bourbon-Parma (agnatic)
- Father: Henri, Grand Duke of Luxembourg
- Mother: María Teresa Mestre y Batista

Prince Louis of Luxembourg, Prince of Nassau, Prince of Bourbon-Parma (Louis Xavier Marie Guillaume; born 3 August 1986) is a member of the grand ducal family of Luxembourg and the third son of Henri, Grand Duke of Luxembourg and Maria Teresa, Grand Duchess of Luxembourg, and the younger brother of Grand Duke Guillaume V.

Louis has two elder siblings, Guillaume and Felix; and two younger siblings, Alexandra and Sébastien. He was married to Tessy Antony, a former NCO in the Luxembourg Army, whom he divorced in 2019.

== Early life and education ==
After having spent two years in the United States, where Louis underwent training in "Aeronautics and Aeronautical Management" and gained his "private pilot certificate", the princely family moved to the United Kingdom. There, he attended university. In May 2014, he graduated from Richmond, The American International University in London with a BA degree in Art in Communications. He wrote his undergraduate dissertation on humanitarian advertisement. He then continued his study at Birkbeck College in London and obtained an MA degree in Psychosocial Studies in 2017.

At the International Forum on Learning Disabilities, held on 30 January 2016 in Luxembourg, Louis spoke for the first time in public about his struggle with dyslexia. He was diagnosed at the age of 10. He said of his learning difficulty, "I did not understand what was happening. I was constantly forced to try to achieve the same levels as others. That takes a lot of time and leaves you frustrated because you can't do it." He also said that he used sports, especially rugby, as an outlet for his frustration.

Prince Louis is fluent in Luxembourgish, French, English, and German, and has a good knowledge of Spanish.

== Marriage and family ==
On 12 March 2006, Tessy Antony gave birth to a boy, named Gabriel Michael Louis Ronny de Nassau, who was born at a private Swiss hospital, Clinic des Grangettes, in Geneva. Their son was the first grandchild of Grand Duke Henri, and Grand Duchess Maria Teresa.

Louis married Antony on 29 September 2006 in Gilsdorf's Catholic parish church. Upon his initially morganatic marriage, he gave up his succession rights and those of all the couple's children. Although he retained his title of "Prince of Luxembourg" and the style of "Royal Highness", his wife and son were originally only given the surname de Nassau with no titles. The couple's second son, Noah Etienne Guillaume Gabriel Matthias Xavier de Nassau, was born on 21 September 2007 at the Grand Duchess Charlotte Maternity Hospital. The baby was baptised at the same church in Gilsdorf where his parents married and his elder brother was baptised.

On Luxembourg's National Day on 23 June 2009, Tessy was given the title of "Princess of Luxembourg" and the style "Royal Highness". Their sons and future children were also given the title "Prince of Nassau" with the style "Royal Highness". The family lived in London.

The Grand Ducal Court announced the separation of Louis and Tessy on 18 January 2017. Divorce proceedings began in the United Kingdom, where the couple lived. The divorce was finalized on 4 April 2019.

On 6 April 2021, the Grand Ducal Court announced the engagement of Prince Louis to Scarlett-Lauren Sirgue (born on 8 August 1991 in Bordeaux). She is the daughter of Pierre Sirgue, a lawyer and former member of the French National Assembly for National Front (a far-right political party), and Scarlett Berrebi, a lawyer. On 22 February 2022, it was announced that Prince Louis and Scarlett-Lauren had called off the engagement.

== Patronage ==
Louis is a patron of the Luxembourg Federation of Table Tennis (since 2004), the Martial Arts Federation (since 2010), and the Luxembourg Aeronautical Federation (since 2011).

== Honours and awards ==
- Luxembourg:
  - Knight of the Order of the Gold Lion of the House of Nassau (Note: Sons and brothers of the Grand Duke receive the order by birth.)
  - Knight Grand Cross of Order of Adolphe of Nassau (Note: Princes and Princesses of the Grand-Ducal House of Luxembourg are Grand Crosses of the Order by birth but wear the order's insignias only after the age of 18.)

Prince Louis of Luxembourg House of Luxembourg-Nassau Cadet branch of the House of Nassau Born: 3 August 1986
Royal titles
Preceded by Prince Liam of Nassau	Line of succession to the French throne (Legitimist); 40th position	Succeeded by Prince Gabriel of Nassau
