= List of members of the European Parliament for Luxembourg, 2024–2029 =

This is a list of the 6 members of the European Parliament for Luxembourg in the 2024 to 2029 session. The members were elected in the 2024 European Parliament election in Luxembourg.

== List ==
Name	National party	EP Group	Preference votes	Ref
Isabel Wiseler-Santos Lima	Christian Social People's Party (CSV)	EPP	58,307	
Martine Kemp (Note: Christophe Hansen was elected but refused to take his seat to become a European commissioner.)	Christian Social People's Party (CSV)	EPP	51,670	
Marc Angel	Luxembourg Socialist Workers' Party (LSAP)	S&D	69,648	
Charles Goerens	Democratic Party (DP)	RE	86,132	
Tilly Metz	The Greens	Greens/EFA	43,828	
Fernand Kartheiser	Alternative Democratic Reform Party (ADR)	ECR	37,684	
