= Municipal Hospital (Luxembourg) =

- Centre Hospitalier de Luxembourg
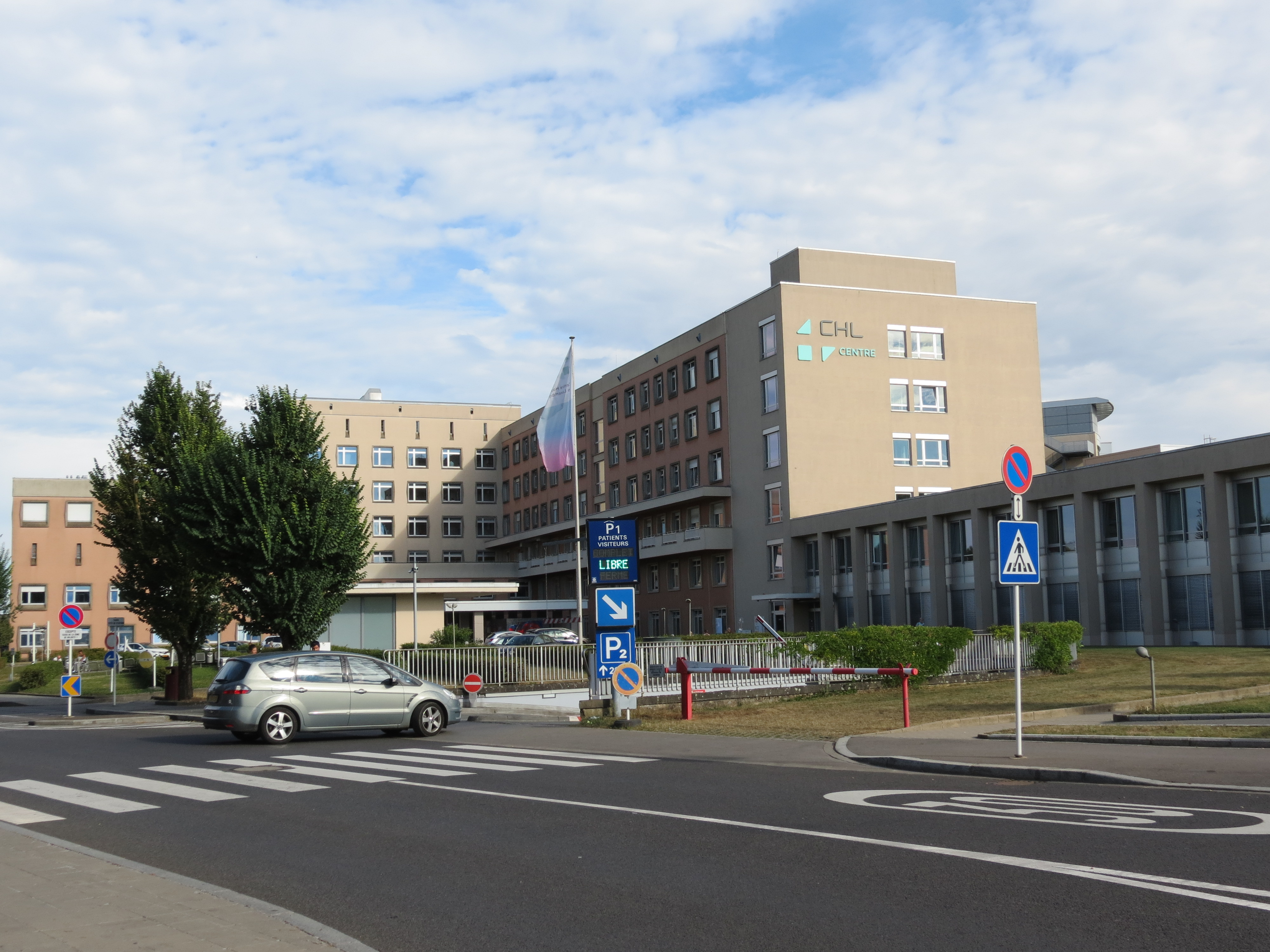

Geography
- Location: Luxembourg City
- Coordinates: 49°37′06″N 06°06′03″E

Organisation
- Type: General

History
- Constructed: 1973
- Opened: 1976

Links
- Website: https://www.chl.lu/en

The Municipal Hospital (French: Hôpital municipal) is the main hospital in Luxembourg City, in southern Luxembourg. It is located off the Route d'Arlon N6 road, in Rollingergrund, in the west of the city. The hospital forms the largest part of the Centre Hospitalier de Luxembourg, the public sector healthcare provider in Luxembourg City.

Opened in 1976 as part of the newly created CHL, the hospital is set on seven floors (including one below ground) and provides all the services of a general hospital.
