= Order of Adolphe of Nassau =

Luxembourgish order

Order of Civil and Military Merit of Adolph of Nassau
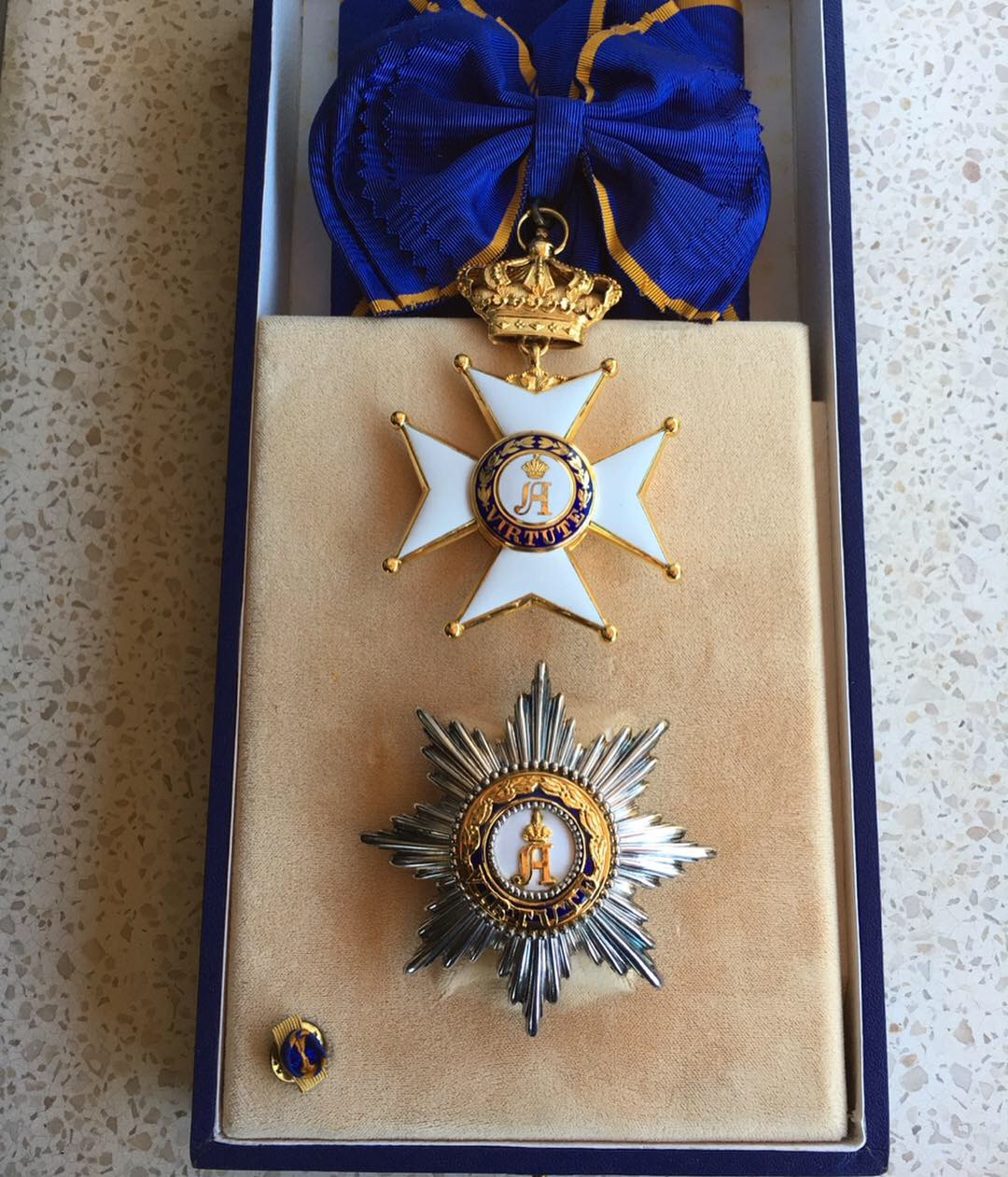
- Grand Cross insignia (civil type) of the Order

Awarded by Grand Duke of Luxembourg
- Type: Order of merit with eight grades
- Established: 8 May 1858; 1858–1866 (Duchy of Nassau); 1890–present (Luxembourg)
- Motto: VIRTUTE
- Awarded for: Meritorious service to the Grand Duke and Luxembourg
- Status: Currently constituted
- Grand Master: Grand Duke Guillaume V of Luxembourg
- Chancellor: Henri Ahlborn
- Grades: Grand Cross, Grand Officer, Commander of the Crown, Commander/Cross of Honour for Ladies, Officer of the Crown, Officer, Knight of the Crown, Knight

Precedence
- Next (higher): Order of the Gold Lion of the House of Nassau
- Next (lower): Order of the Oak Crown
- Ribbon bar of the order

The Order of Civil and Military Merit of Adolph of Nassau (French: Ordre de Mérite civil et militaire d’Adolphe de Nassau) is an order of merit of the Grand Duchy of Luxembourg for meritorious service to the Grand Duke, the Grand-Ducal House and Luxembourg. It was founded in 1858 as a chivalric order of the Duchy of Nassau by Adolphe of Nassau in honor of his namesake and ancestor, Adolf, Count of Nassau, the only member of the House of Nassau to have been Roman King of Germany. After the Duchy of Nassau was annexed by Prussia in 1866 and Adolphe became Grand Duke of Luxembourg in 1890, he revived the order as an order of merit.

== Grades ==
The order consists of eight grades, with two crosses and three medals attached to the order:

1. Grand Cross - wears the badge with a crown on a sash on the right shoulder, and the plaque on the left chest (unlike the civil version, the military version of the Grand Cross bears two swords on its badge and plaque);
2. Grand Officer - wears the badge with a crown on a necklet, and the plaque on the left chest;
3. Commander of the Crown - wears the badge with a crown on a necklet;
4. Commander (male) / Cross of Honour for Ladies (female) - men wear the badge on a necklet; women wear the badge with a crown on a ribbon tied as a bow at the left chest (the crown of the Cross of Honour for Ladies is slightly smaller and the sash slightly different from that of the Commander of the Crown, and the badge bears four letters on the outside);
5. Officer of the Crown - wears the badge with a crown on a chest ribbon with rosette on the left chest;
6. Officer - wears the badge on a chest ribbon with rosette on the left chest;
7. Knight of the Crown - wears the badge with a crown on a chest ribbon on the left chest;
8. Knight - wears the badge on a chest ribbon on the left chest;

Members of the order belong to either the Civil or the Military Division. The Grand Duke of Luxembourg is the Grand Master of the order.

Attached to the order are the following crosses and medals of merit:

- Crosses in Gold and Silver - wears the cross on a ribbon on the left chest;
- Medals in Gold, Silver and Bronze - wears the medal on a ribbon on the left chest.

The medals and crosses do not confer membership in the order upon the recipient.

Foreigners may also be made members of the order, and it is common as a diplomatic award. The order was used as well in World War II to reward a handful of Allied officers who had helped liberate Luxembourg from the rule of Nazi Germany. Because of the small size of Luxembourg, and its minor role as a campaign theater, membership of the order was not awarded as frequently as other major World War II honours, such as the Croix de Guerre.

== Insignia ==
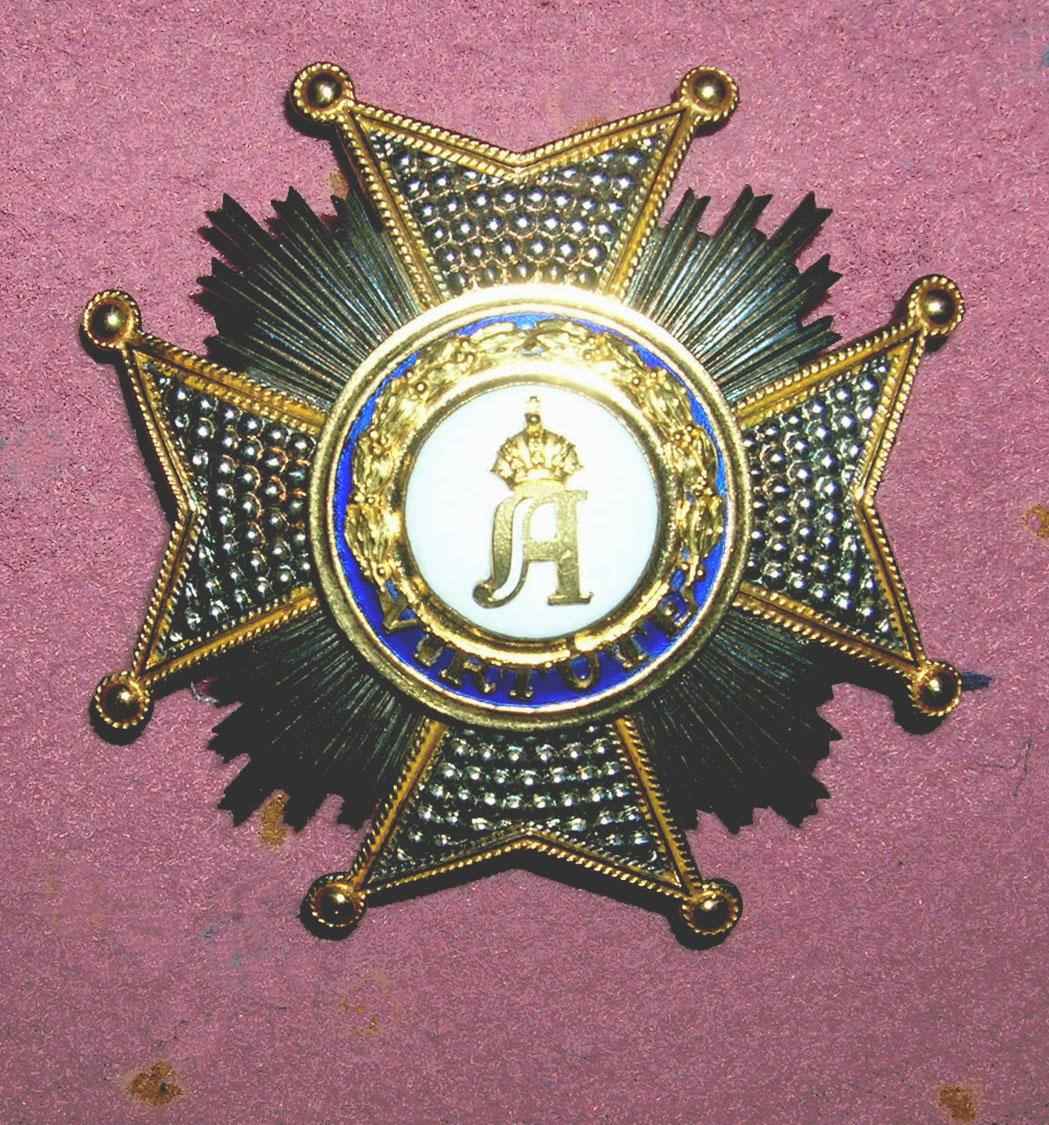
Plaque of a Grand Officer

- The badge of the order is a gold cross, enamelled in white and featuring eight points, each of which ends in a gold pearl. The central disc of the front side bears the gold letter "A" in Gothic script then crowned by an imperial crown. The whole is encircled by a laurel crown on a blue-enamelled background on which the motto "Virtute" is inscribed in gold letters. The other side has the inscriptions "1292" (in that year that Adolf of Nassau-Weilburg was crowned as King of the Romans) and "1858" (this was the year of creation of the order by Adolphe, Duke of Nassau), in gold letters on a white-enamelled background. The military division shows two additional crossed swords under the central medallion. The classes of the crown have a gold crown attached above the badge.
- The plaque (breast star) of the civil division of the order is (for Grand Cross) an eight-pointed faceted silver star, or (for Grand Officer) a faceted silver Maltese Cross with silver rays between the arms. The central disc is the same to that of the badge. The plaque of the military division shows two additional crossed swords under the central medallion, with gold hilts and silver blades, and the corresponding badge shows two crossed swords in gold.
- The cross is shaped in the same form as the batch, but non-enamelled, and made of plain gold or silver.
- The medal is roundly shaped, made of gold, silver or bronze, and with the portrait of Adolph, Duke of Nassau depicted on it.
- The ribbon of the order is blue moiré with a small orange stripe at each edge. "The ribbon is blue moiré edged in orange. The badge of the Grand Cross is suspended from a 100 mm wide ribbon. The Grand Officer and Commander wear the badge suspended from a 43 mm wide ribbon, while the Officer and Knight wear it suspended from a 38 mm wide ribbon. The ribbon of the Officer features a rosette in identical colours."

Ribbon bars
Grand Cross	Grand Officer	Commander of the Crown	Commander / Cross of Honour for Ladies
Officer of the Crown	Officer	Knight of the Crown	Knight

== Award criteria ==
"Honorary distinctions of the Grand Duchy of Luxembourg" :

"The Order of Civil and Military Merit of Adolph of Nassau recognises, in addition to foreign heads of state, individuals for their meritorious service to the Grand Duke, the Grand-Ducal House and Luxembourg, as well as for their outstanding loyalty to the Grand Duke or his House. The order also rewards those who have excelled in the arts and sciences, as it does residents of Luxembourg or foreign nationals as a sign of benevolence.

"All the grades of the Order of Civil and Military Merit of Adolph of Nassau are bestowed by a decree signed by the Grand Duke and countersigned by the chancellor of the order. When the order is conferred on foreign nationals, the consent of the foreign government must be sought."

=== Princes of Luxembourg ===
By statute of the order, princes and princesses of the Grand-Ducal House of Luxembourg are Grand Crosses of the order by birth, but they don't wear the order's decoration until they are 18 years old.

== Gallery ==
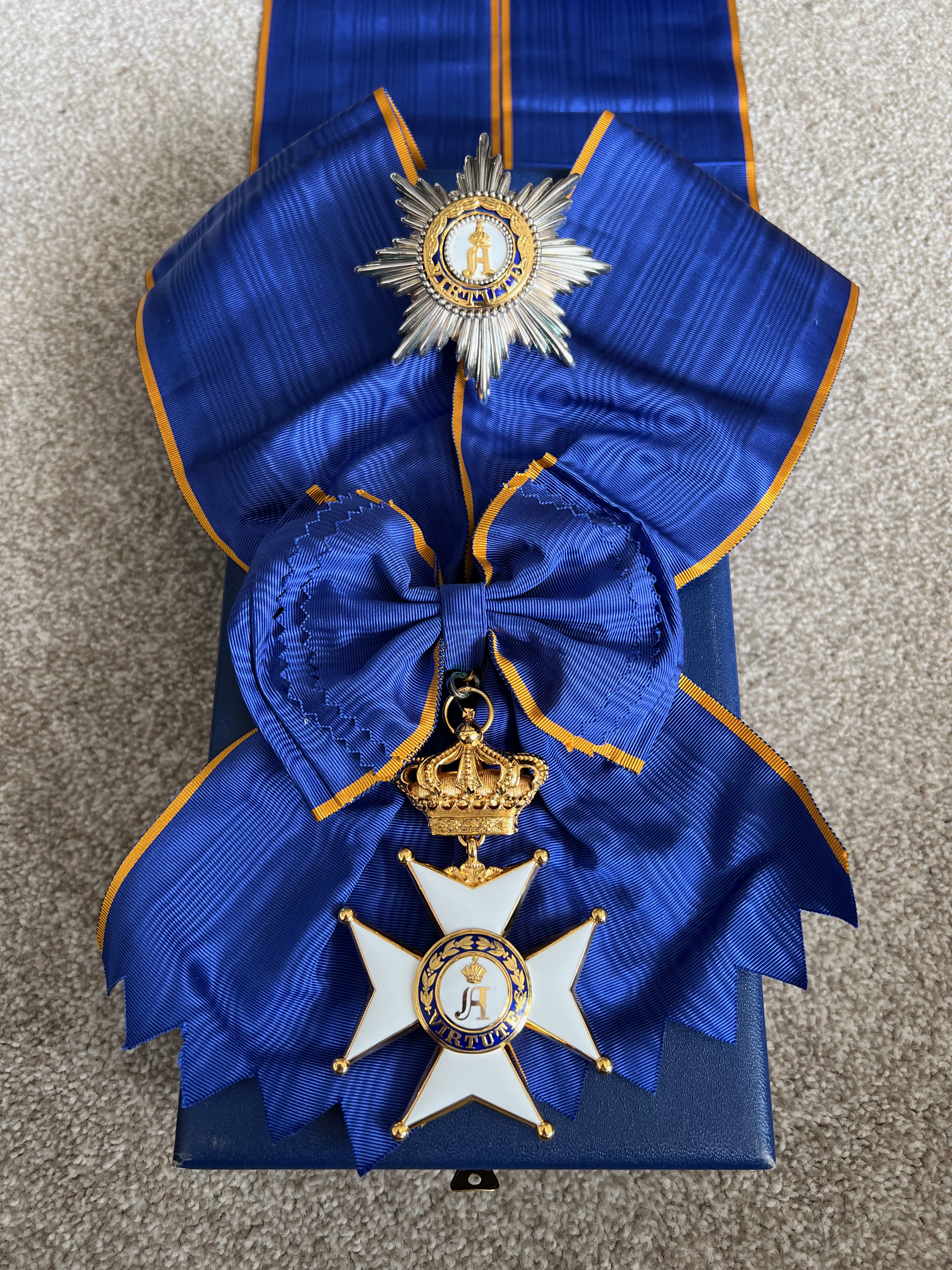
Grand Cross set.

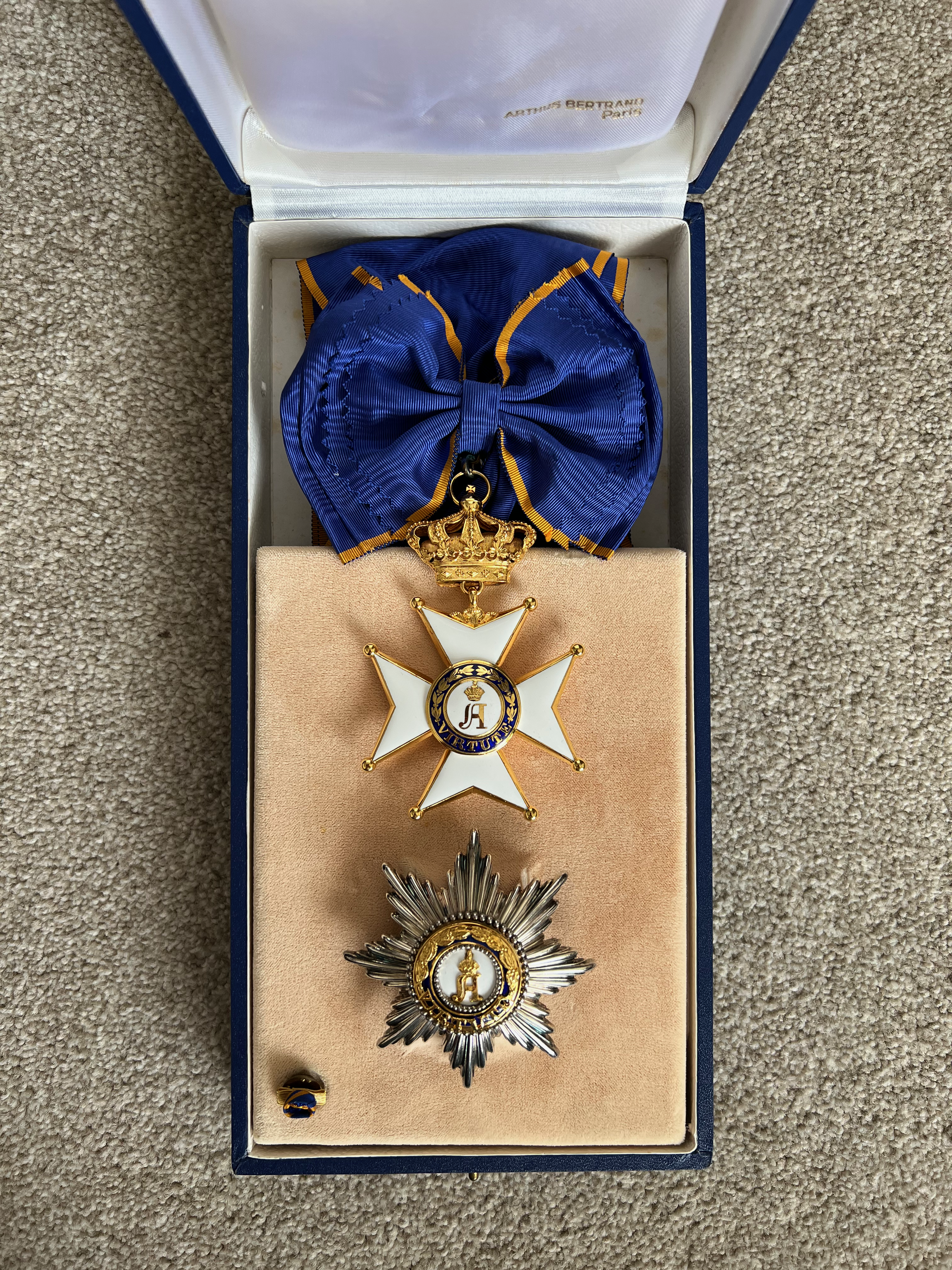
Grand Cross set.

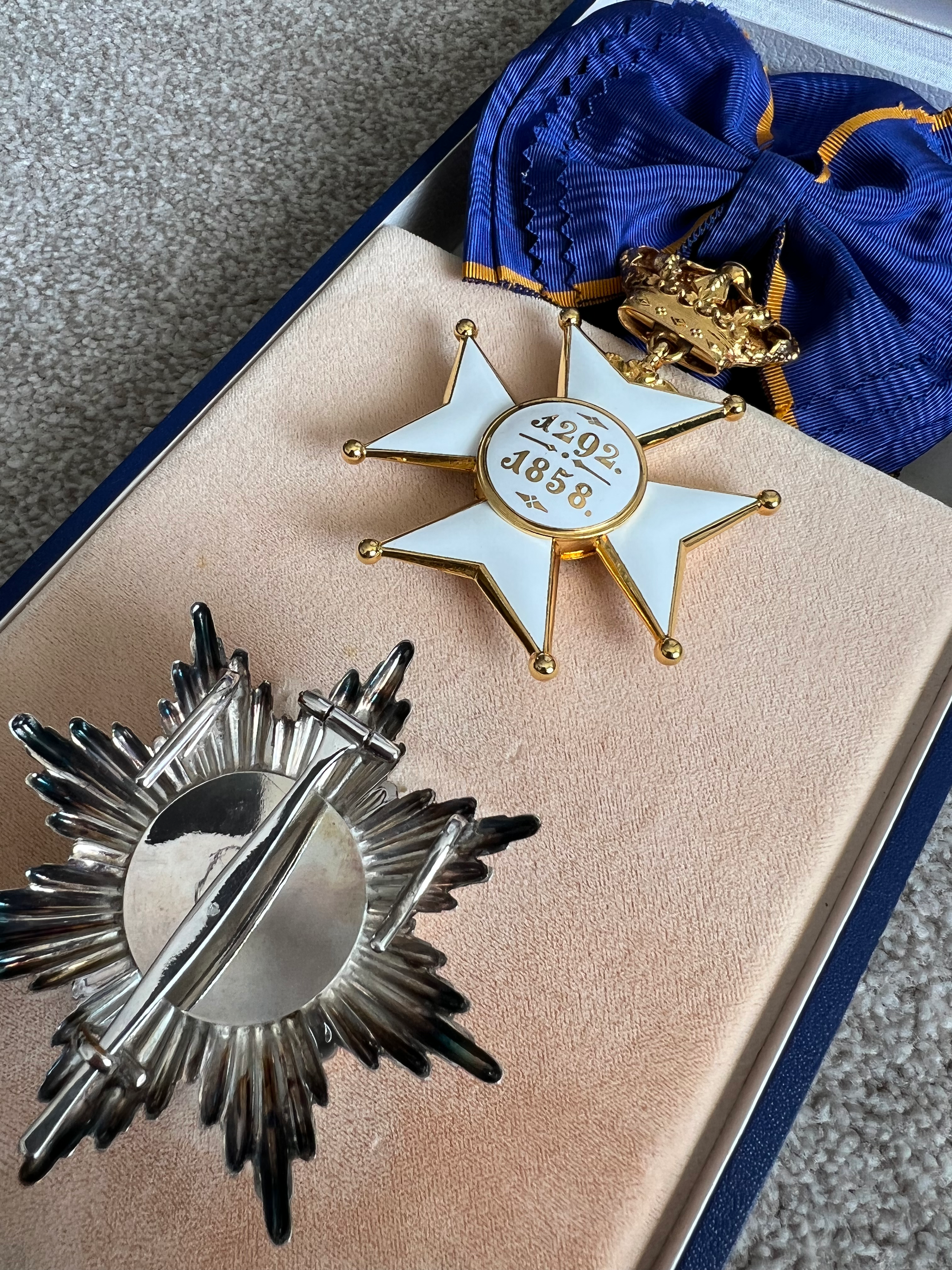
Reverse of the insignia of the Grand Cross.

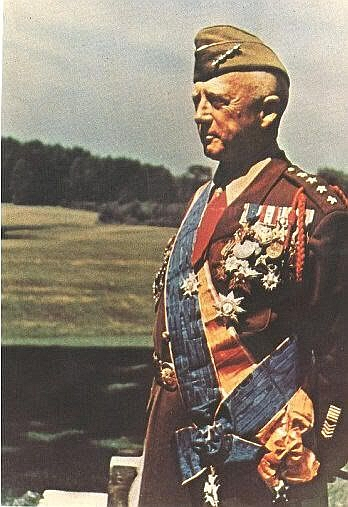
George S. Patton wearing the Grand Cross of the order.

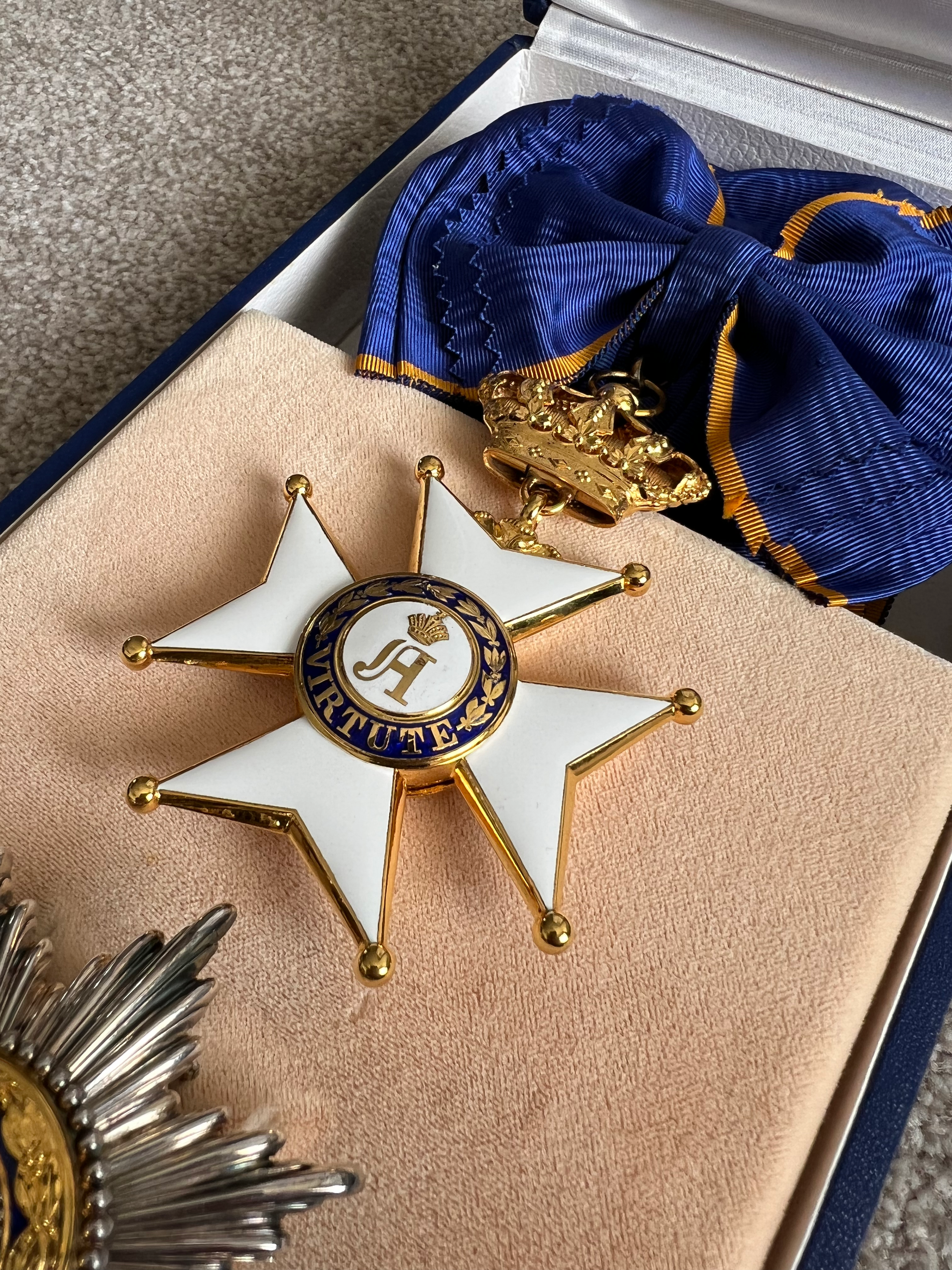
Grand Cross badge.

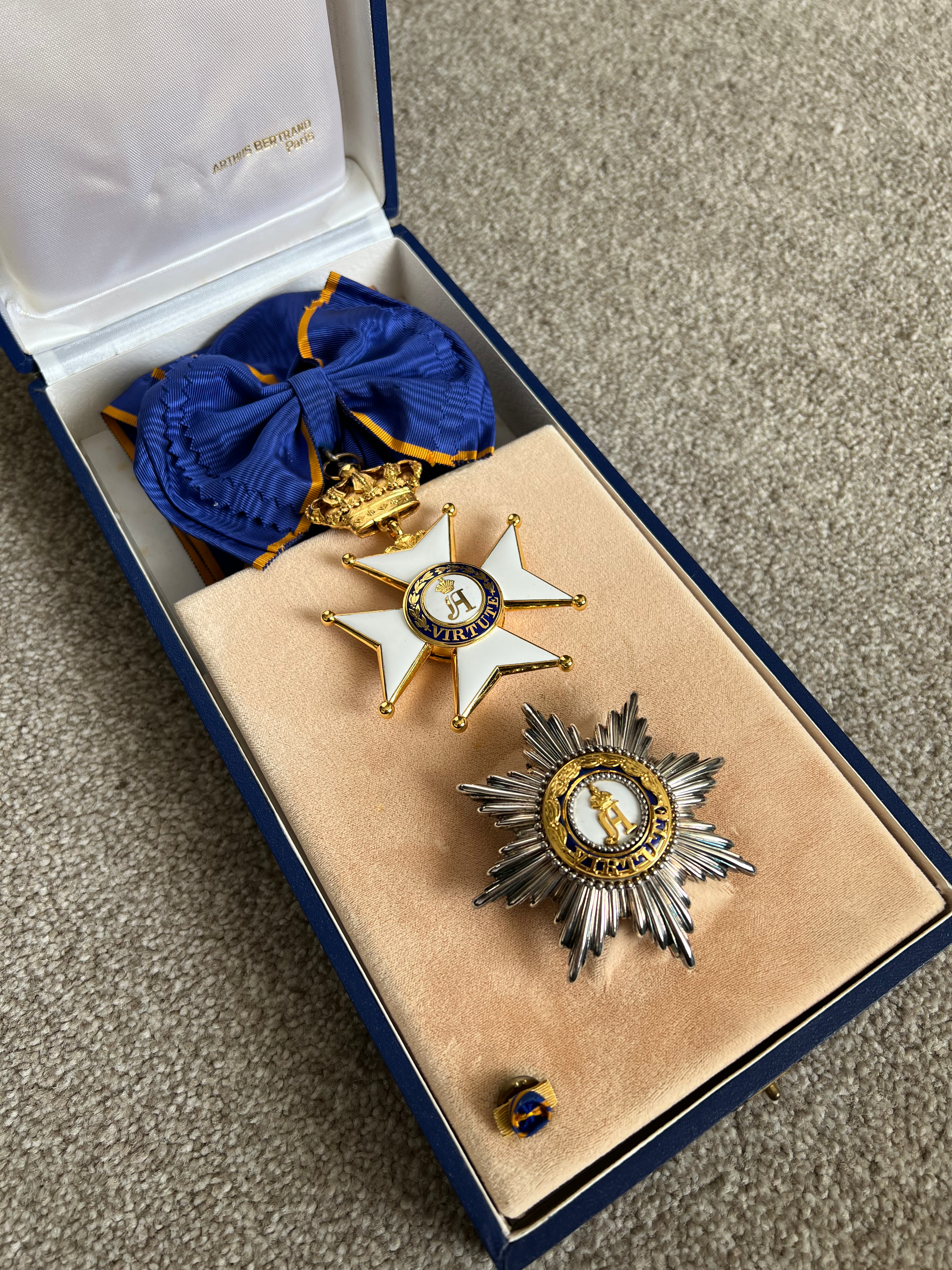
Grand Cross set of insignia.

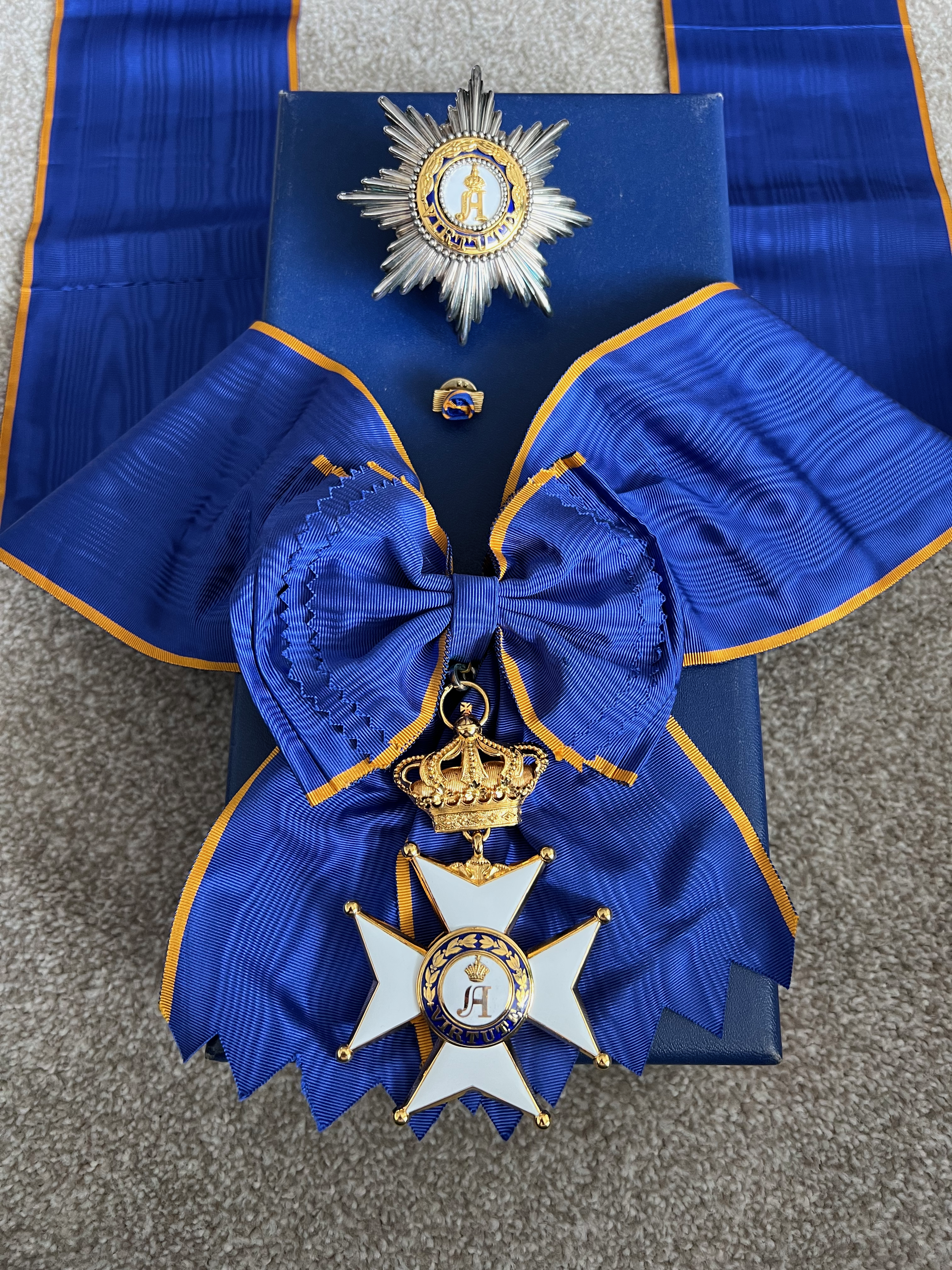
Grand Cross of the order.

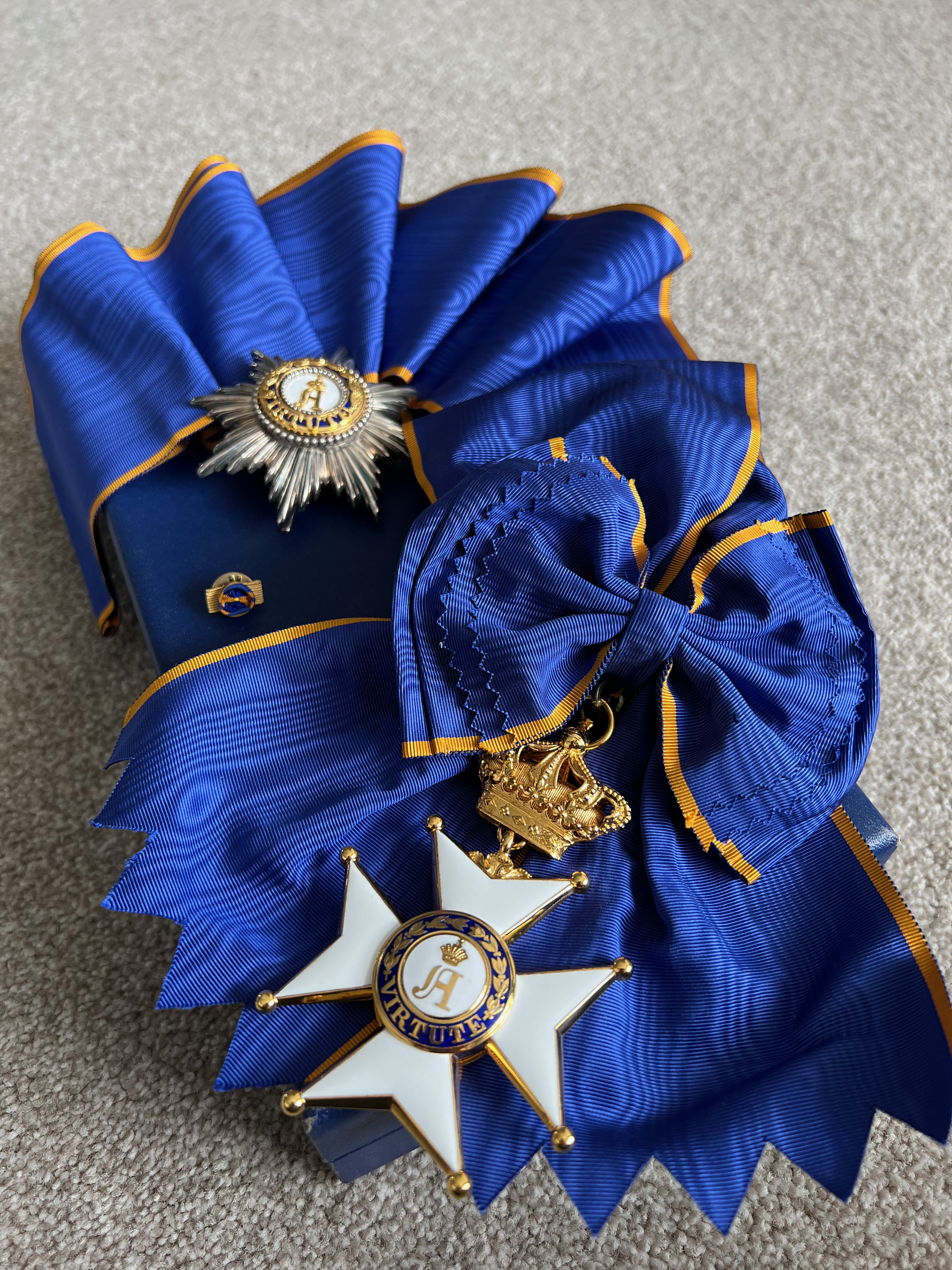
Grand Cross set.

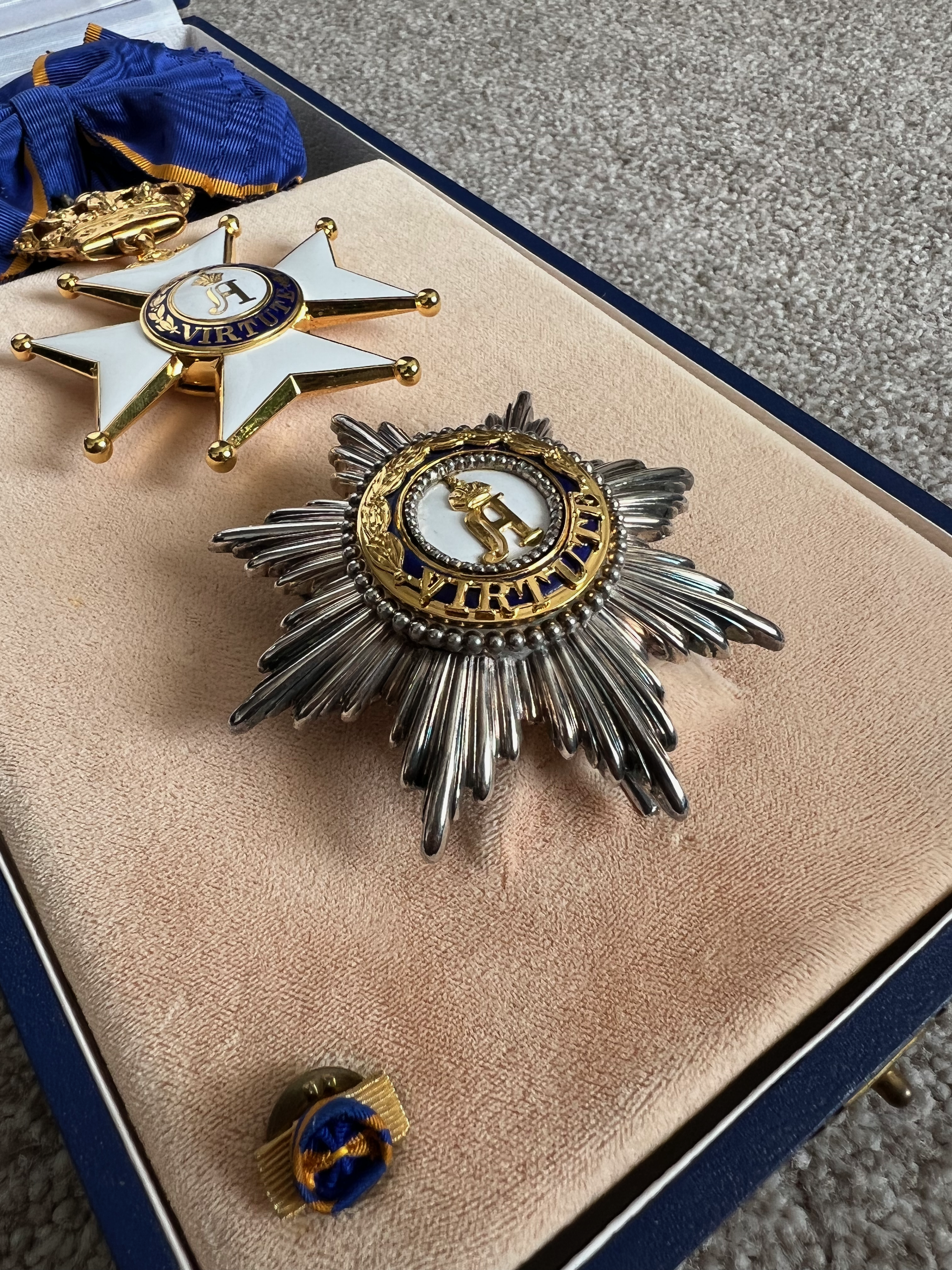
The star of the Grand Cross.

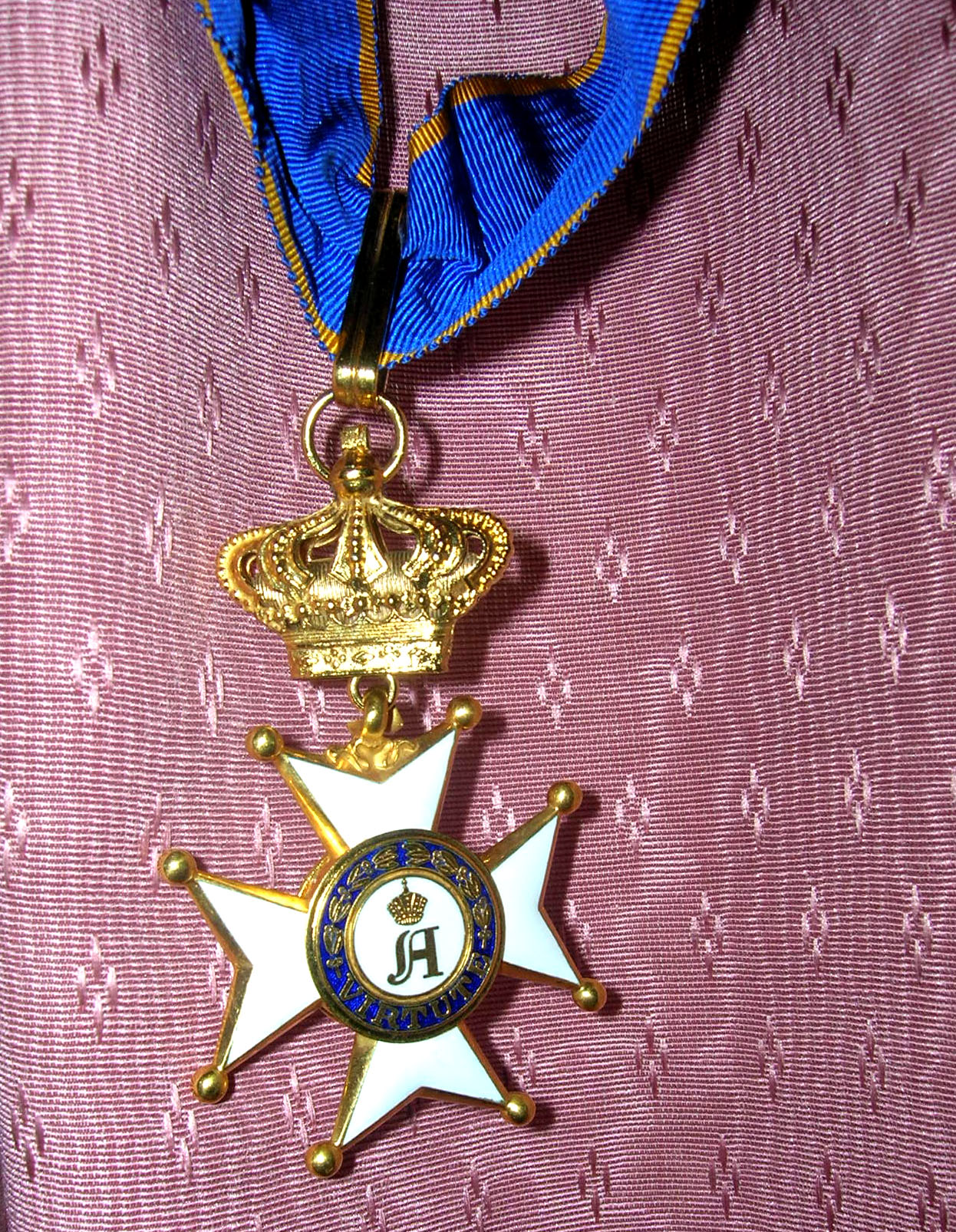
Commanders Class of the Order

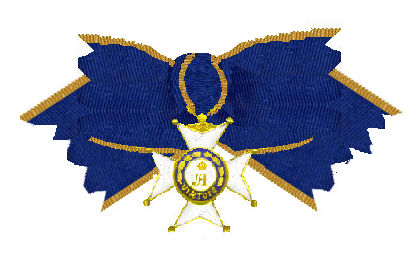
Knights class on a ladies bow.

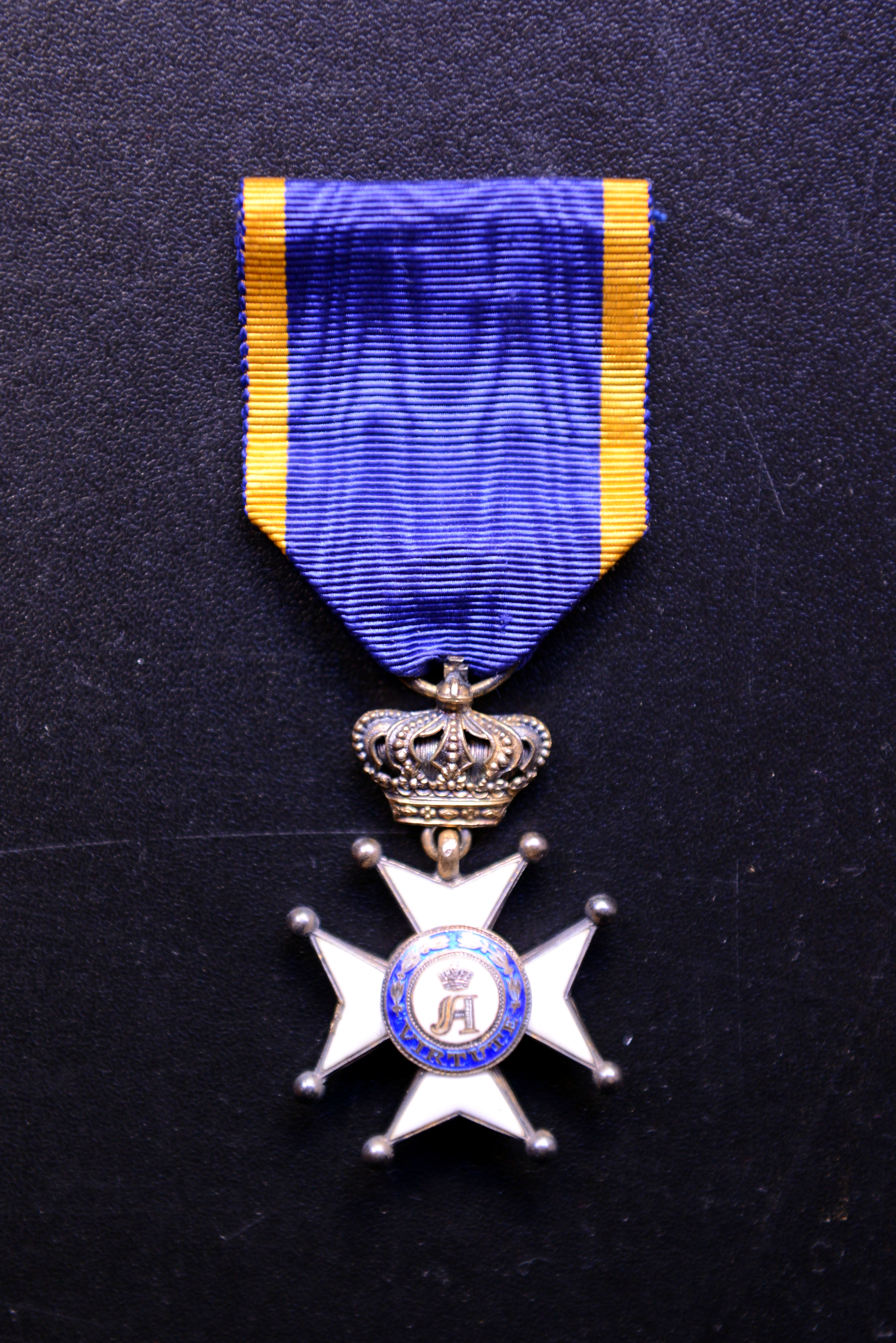
Knight class with a crown.

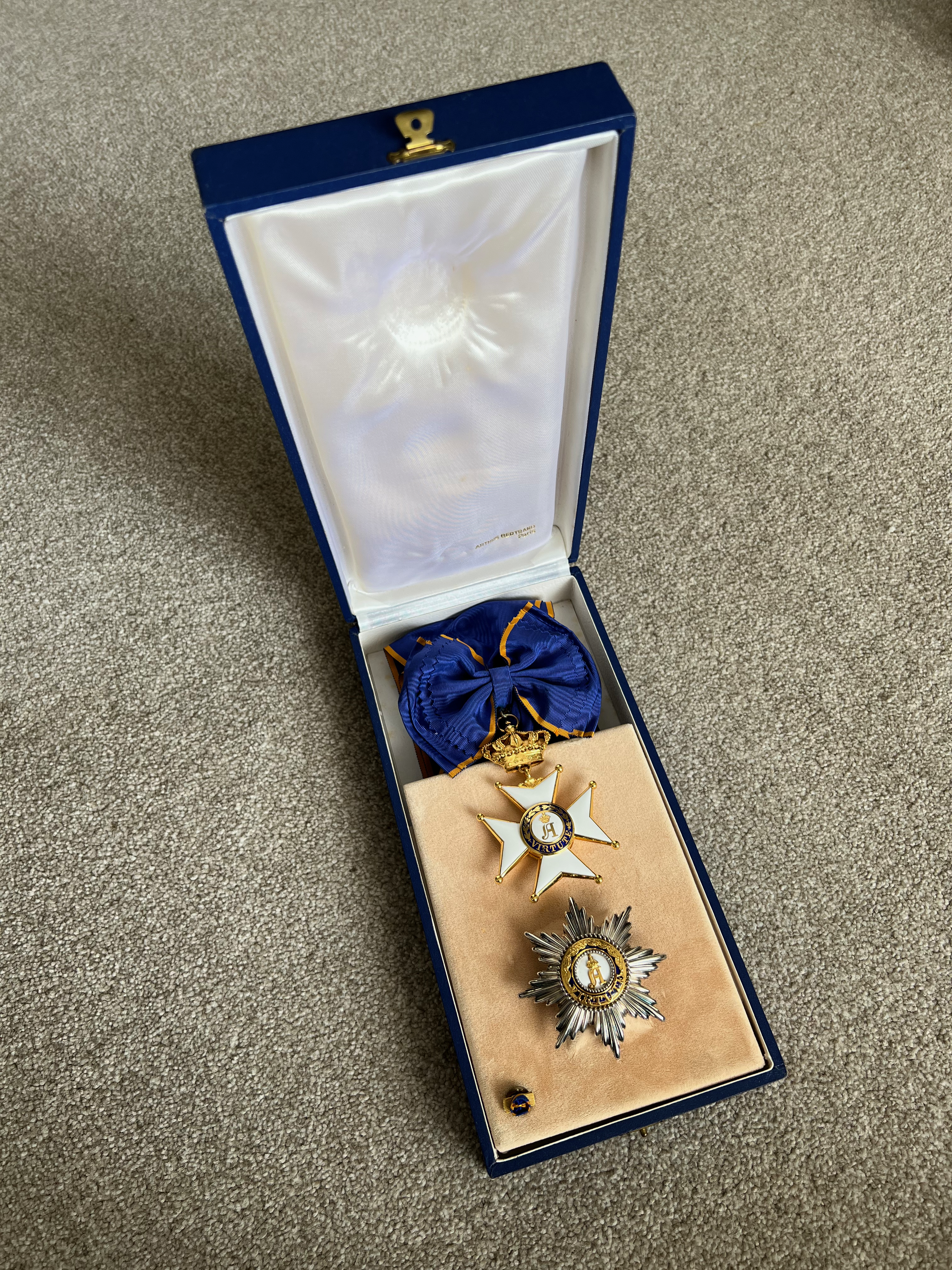
Grand Cross set in a case by Arthus Bertrand.

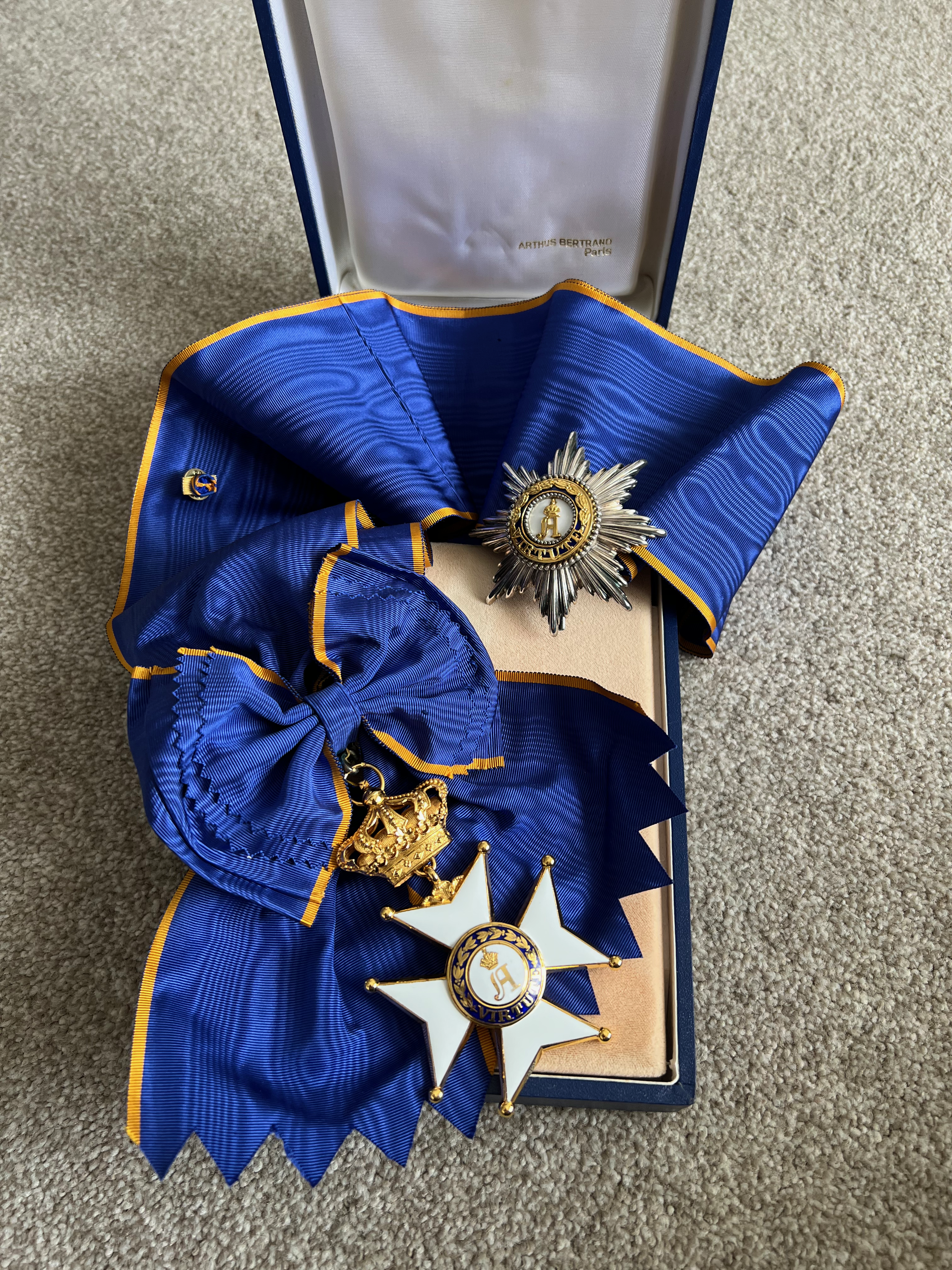
Grand Cross set.
