= Wedding of Prince Philippe and Mathilde d'Udekem d'Acoz =

1999 Royal Wedding

- Date: 4 December 1999; 26 years ago
- Venue: Brussels Town Hall and St. Michael and St. Gudula Cathedral
- Location: Brussels, Belgium
- Participants: Prince Philippe, Duke of Brabant; Jonkvrouw Mathilde d'Udekem d'Acoz

The wedding of Prince Philippe, Duke of Brabant, and Mathilde d'Udekem d'Acoz took place on 4 December 1999 in Brussels, Belgium. The civil proceedings were conducted at Brussels Town Hall while the religious ceremony took place at the Cathedral of St. Michael and St. Gudula. The wedding has been described as the social event of the decade within Belgium and it was the last royal wedding of the second millennium.

== The bride and groom ==
Philippe, then Duke of Brabant, is the eldest son of King Albert II and Queen Paola. Mathilde d'Udekem d'Acoz is a descendant of Belgian and Polish nobility. After the wedding, Mathilde became the duchess of Brabant and a princess of Belgium on 8 November 1999 (published on 13 November 1999 and effective from 4 December 1999). In 2013, Philippe and Mathilde became the king and queen of the Belgians. Mathilde is the first Belgian born queen in the country's history.

== Wedding events ==
External image
- Philippe and Mathilde exiting the Cathedral of Saint Michel

The first of the day's main events took place in the Gothic setting of Brussels Town Hall where Philippe and Mathilde contracted a civil marriage in the French, Dutch and German languages. Mathilde's bridal gown was designed by Edouard Vermeulen. Philippe wore the uniform of a Belgian Air Force colonel. Thereafter the couple traveled to the nearby Cathedral of St. Michael and St. Gudula to marry according to the rites of the Roman Catholic Church. An evening reception took place in the Palace of Laeken, a royal residence.

== Popular reactions and effects ==
The run up to the wedding was said to have led to widespread feelings of positive sentiment in Belgium, with the potential for greater unity between the country's Dutch-speaking north and French-speaking south. Around 50,000 people lined the streets of Brussels on the occasion of Philippe and Mathilde's wedding. As many as 200,000 people had been expected but the lower numbers were perhaps on account of the bitterly cold weather on the day. After the wedding, some popular culture academics commented that the wedding had had a unifying effect on the Belgian people as well as marking a new phase of positivity in the country. The BBC, however, reported that academics and political commentators in Belgium deemed that the national rift was too great for the wedding to have much effect.

== Guests ==
=== The groom's family ===
==== Belgian royal family ====
- The King and Queen of the Belgians, the groom's parents
  - The Archduchess and Archduke of Austria-Este, the groom's sister and brother-in-law
    - Prince Amedeo of Belgium, Archduke of Austria-Este, the groom's nephew
    - Princess Maria Laura of Belgium, Archduchess of Austria-Este, the groom's niece
    - Prince Joachim of Belgium, Archduke of Austria-Este, the groom's nephew
    - Princess Luisa Maria of Belgium, Archduchess of Austria-Este, the groom's niece
  - Prince Laurent of Belgium, the groom's brother
- Queen Fabiola of Belgium, the groom's paternal aunt by marriage
- Prince Alexandre and Princess Léa of Belgium, the groom's paternal half-uncle and aunt
- Princess Marie-Esméralda, Mrs Moncada and Dr Salvador Moncada, the groom's paternal half-aunt and uncle

==== Ruffo family ====
- Prince Fabrizio and Donna Luisa Ruffo di Calabria
  - Prince Fulco and Princess Melba Ruffo di Calabria
  - Prince Augusto Ruffo di Calabria
  - Princess Irma Ruffo di Calabria
  - Prince Alessandro Ruffo di Calabria
- Don Antonello and Donna Rosa Maria Ruffo di Calabria
  - Don Lucio Ruffo di Calabria
  - Donna Claudia Ruffo di Calabria
- Flavia Porcari Li Destri
- Donna Marielli Ruffo di Calabria

=== The bride's family ===
- Count Patrick and Countess Anna Maria d’Udekem d’Acoz, the bride's parents
  - Countess Elisabeth d’Udekem d’Acoz, the bride's sister
  - Countess Hélène d’Udekem d’Acoz, the bride's sister
  - Count Charles-Henri d’Udekem d’Acoz, the bride's brother
- Count Henri d’Udekem d’Acoz
- Count Raoul and Countess Francoise d’Udekem d’Acoz
- Countess Gabrielle Komorowski
- Countess Rose Komorowski and Jean-Michel Maus de Rolley
- Count Michel and Countess Dominique Komorowski
- Countess Christine Komorowski and Alain de Brabant
- Countess Marie Komorowski and Gérard Braun
- Prince Alexandre Sapieha
- Prince Stefan Sapieha

=== Foreign royalty ===
==== Members of reigning families ====
- The Queen and Prince Consort of Denmark, the groom's second cousin once removed, and her husband
- The Crown Prince and Crown Princess of Japan (representing the Emperor of Japan)
- Princess Rahma bint el-Hassan of Jordan (representing the King of Jordan) and Sayyid Ala’a Arif al-Batayneh
- Princess Sumaya bint el-Hassan of Jordan
- The Prince and Princess of Liechtenstein, the groom's third cousin once removed, and his wife
- Prince Wenzeslaus of Liechtenstein, the groom's fourth cousin
- Prince Nikolaus and Princess Margaretha of Liechtenstein, the groom's first cousin and her husband
  - Princess Marie-Astrid of Liechtenstein, the groom's first cousin once removed
- The Grand Duke and Grand Duchess of Luxembourg, the groom's paternal uncle and aunt
  - The Hereditary Grand Duke and Hereditary Grand Duchess of Luxembourg, the groom's first cousin and his wife
  - Prince Jean of Luxembourg, the groom's first cousin
  - Prince Guillaume of Luxembourg, the groom's first cousin
- The Hereditary Prince of Monaco (representing the Prince of Monaco)
- Princess Lalla Hasna of Morocco (representing the King of Morocco)
- The Crown Prince of Nepal (representing the King of Nepal)
- The Queen of the Netherlands, the groom's fourth cousin twice removed
  - (Netherlands) The Prince of Orange, the groom's fifth cousin once removed
  - Prince Constantijn of the Netherlands, the groom's fifth cousin once removed
- The King and Queen of Norway, the groom's first cousin once removed, and his wife
  - The Crown Prince of Norway, the groom's second cousin
  - Princess Märtha Louise of Norway, the groom's second cousin
- The Queen of Spain, the groom's third cousin once removed (representing the King of Spain)
  - (Spain) The Prince of Asturias, the groom's fourth cousin
- The King and Queen of Sweden, the groom's third cousin and his wife
- The Prince of Wales, the groom's third cousin once removed (representing the Queen of the United Kingdom)

==== Members of non-reigning families ====
- Archduke Carl Ludwig of Austria, the groom's second cousin, twice removed
  - Archduke Carl Christian and Archduchess Marie Astrid of Austria, the groom's third cousin once removed and the groom's first cousin
- Archduke Simeon and Archduchess María of Austria, the groom's third cousin once removed, and the groom's fourth cousin once removed
- Archduke Karl Peter and Archduchess Alexandra of Austria, the groom's third cousin once removed, and his wife
- The Dowager Archduchess of Austria-Este, the groom's fourth cousin once removed
  - Archduke Gerhard of Austria-Este, the groom's fifth cousin
  - Archduke Martin of Austria-Este, the groom's fifth cousin
- The Duke of Bavaria, the groom's second cousin once removed
- The Duke and Duchess in Bavaria, the groom's second cousin once removed, and his wife
  - Duchess Helene of Bavaria, the groom's third cousin
- The Prince and Princess of Turnovo, the groom's fourth cousin once removed
- The Duke of Vendôme, the groom's fourth cousin once removed
- The Duke and Duchess of Angoulême, the groom's fourth cousin, once removed and his wife
- The Dowager Princess Napoléon, widow of the groom's second cousin twice removed
  - Prince Jérôme Napoléon, the groom's third cousin once removed
- King Constantine II and Queen Anne-Marie of the Hellenes, the groom's third cousin once removed, and the groom's second cousin once removed
- The Prince and Princess of Naples, the groom's first cousin once removed, and his wife
- Princess Maria Gabriella of Savoy, the groom's first cousin once removed
- The Duke of Braganza, the groom's second cousin twice removed
- King Michael I and Queen Anne of Romania, the groom's third cousin once removed, and the groom's second cousin twice removed
- Prince Dimitri of Yugoslavia, the groom's second cousin

=== Other notable guests ===
- The President of the Republic of Poland and First Lady Jolanta Kwaśniewska
- The President of the Portuguese Republic and First Lady Maria José Ritta
