= Order of precedence in Liechtenstein =

Order of precedence in below contains Princely Family, Government, Parliament, Household, & Others.

I. Princely Family.

1. HSH The Prince.
2. HSH The Hereditary Prince.
3. HRH The Hereditary Princess.
4. HSH Prince Joseph Wenzel.
5. HSH Princess Marie Caroline.
6. HSH Prince George.
7. HSH Prince Nikolaus.
8. HSH Prince Maximilian.
9. HSH Princess Angela.
10. HSH Prince Alfons.
11. HSH Princess Marie.
12. HSH Prince Moritz.
13. HSH Princess Georgina.
14. HSH Prince Benedikt.
15. HSH Princess Tatjana.
16. Baron Philipp Lattorff.
17. Baron Lukas Lattorff.
18. Baroness Elizabeth Lattorff.
19. Baroness Marie Lattorff.
20. Baroness Camilla Lattorff.
21. Baroness Anna Lattorff.
22. Baroness Sophie Lattorff.
23. Baron Maximilian Lattorff.
24. HSH Prince Philipp.
25. HSH Princess Isabelle.
26. HSH Prince Alexander.
27. HSH Princess Astrid.
28. HSH Princess Theodora.
29. HSH Prince Wenzeslaus.
30. HSH Prince Rudolf.
31. HSH Princess Tilsm.
32. HSH Princess Laetitia.
33. HSH Prince Karl Ludwig.
34. HSH Prince Nikolaus.
35. HRH Princess Margaretha.
36. HSH Princess Maria-Anunciata.
37. Mr Emanuele Musini.
38. HSH Princess Marie-Astrid.
39. Mr Raphael Worthington.
40. Master Althaea Worthington.
41. HSH Prince Josef-Emanuel.
42. HSH Princess Maria Claudia.
43. HSH Prince Leopold.
44. HSH The Dowager Marchioness of Marino.

II. Princely Family, Parliament, and Government.

1. HSH The Prince.
2. HSH The Hereditary Prince.
3. HRH The Hereditary Princess.
4. Descendants of The Hereditary Prince.
5. Extended Members of Princely Family.
6. The President of Landtag.
7. The Vice President of Landtag.
8. Members of Landtag.
9. The Prime Minister.
10. The Deputy Prime Minister.
11. Members of Ministers.
12. The President of Supreme Court.
13. The Vice President of Supreme Court.
14. The President of Constitutional Court.
15. The Vice President of Constitutional Court.
16. The President of Regional Court.
17. The Vice President of Regional Court.
18. Foreign Ambassadors.
19. Archbishop.
20. Former Prime Minister.
21. Former Deputy Prime Minister.
22. Former President of Landtag.
23. Former Vice President of Landtag.
24. Former President of Supreme Court.
25. Former Vice President of Supreme Court.
26. Former President of Constitutional Court.
27. Former Vice President of Constitutional Court.
28. The Chief Communes.
29. Marshal of the Realm.
30. Lord and lady in waiting.
31. Members of the Order of the House of Liechtenstein.
