= House of Luxembourg-Nassau =

Reigning family of Luxembourg

- Parent house: • Bourbon-Parma (agnatic); • Nassau-Weilburg (enatic)
- Country: Luxembourg
- Founded: 1921; 105 years ago
- Founder: Jean of Luxembourg
- Current head: Guillaume V of Luxembourg
- Titles: Grand Duke of Luxembourg; Prince/Duke of Nassau; Prince of Bourbon-Parma; Count palatine of the Rhine; Count of Sayn, Königstein, Katzenelnbogen and Diez; Viscount of Hammerstein; Lord of Mahlberg, Wiesbaden, Idstein, Merenberg, Limburg and Eppstein
- Website: monarchie.lu

The House of Luxembourg-Nassau is the current royal house of Luxembourg. It was founded in 1921. It descends from the House of Nassau-Weilburg (cognatically since 2020, formerly enatically from 1964 to 2000, and agnatically until 1964) and from the House of Bourbon-Parma (agnatically since 1964), and consists of the extended family of the reigning Grand Duke. There have been three monarchs from the House of Luxembourg-Nassau: Jean, Henri, and Guillaume V.

== History ==
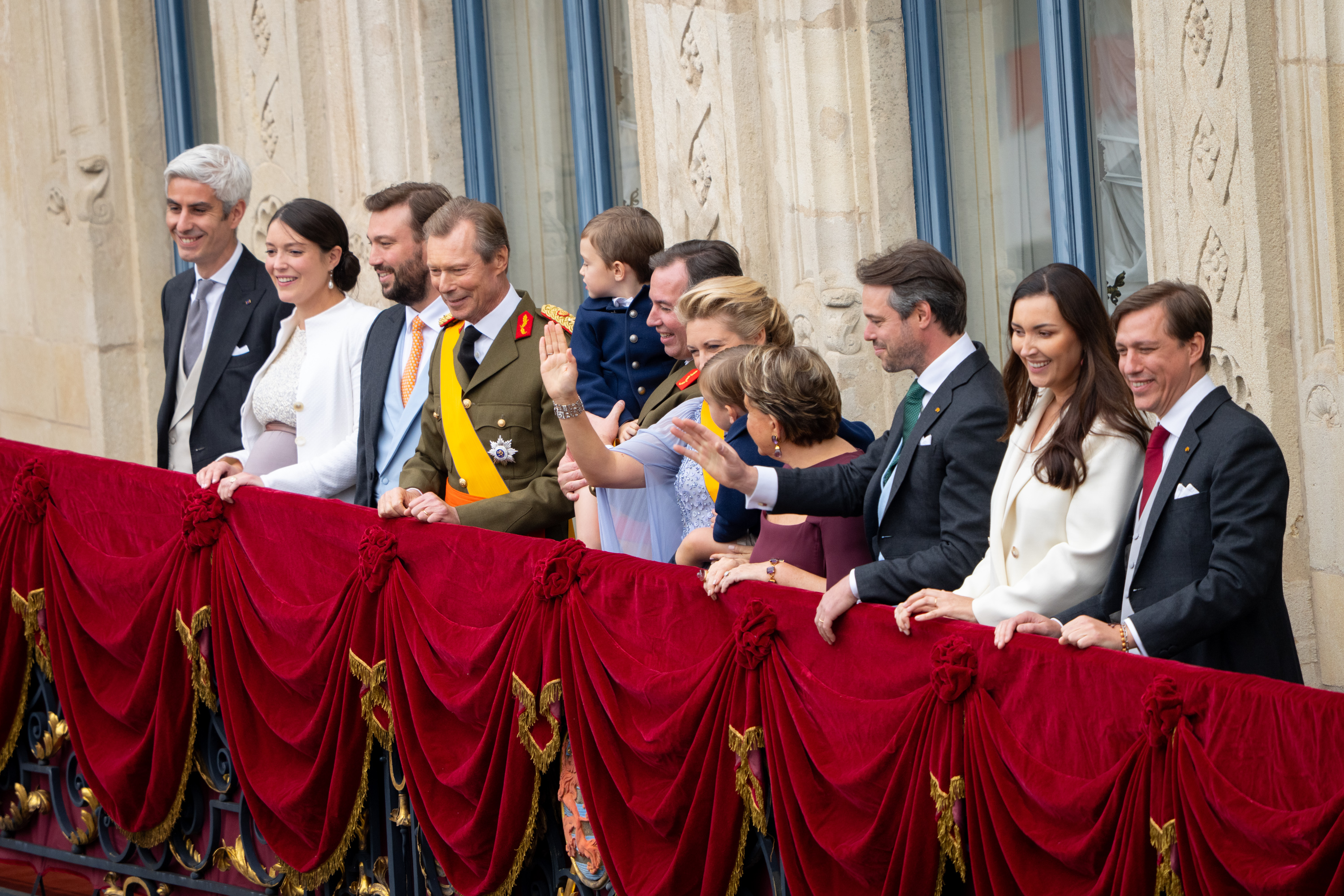
The family at the balcony of the Grand Ducal palace, following the enthronement of Grand Duke Guillaume V

In 1443 the last member of the senior branch of the House of Luxembourg, Duchess Elisabeth, sold the Duchy of Luxembourg to Duke Philip the Good of Burgundy, a prince of the French House of Valois. In 1477 the duchy passed by marriage of Philip's granddaughter, Mary of Burgundy, to Archduke Maximilian I of Austria of the House of Habsburg. Luxembourg was one of the fiefdoms in the former Burgundian Netherlands which Maximilian and Mary's grandson, Emperor Charles V, combined into an integral union, the Seventeen Provinces, by issuing the Pragmatic Sanction of 1549. The southern Netherlands remained part of the Habsburg Empire, first held by the Spanish branch and then by the Austrian line, until 1794 when French revolutionaries replaced Habsburg rule with French hegemony until the defeat of Napoleon.

Luxembourg's territories, centering on the ancestral castle, were captured from occupying French forces in the first stages of the fall of Napoleon. Some were eventually ceded to William VI of Nassau, Prince of Orange, who had been declared Sovereign Prince of the Netherlands in 1813, by his cousin King Frederick William III of Prussia who annexed other territories which had been held by princes of the various branches of the House of Nassau. The Great Powers agreed at the Congress of Vienna in 1815 to re-constitute and elevate Luxembourg into a grand duchy, to be hereditary in the male line of the entire House of Nassau, beginning with the Prince of Orange, who was simultaneously but separately recognised as King of the Netherlands.

Thus William I of the Netherlands ascended the grand ducal throne as the first grand duke of Luxemburg. When the male line of the House of Orange-Nassau became extinct in 1890, the crown of the Netherlands went to his descendant, Wilhelmina of Orange-Nassau, but the crown of Luxembourg continued in the male line, devolving upon the head of the only surviving branch of the House of Nassau, ex-Duke Adolf of Nassau-Weilburg. His son, Guillaume IV (reigned 1905–1912), left no sons and was succeeded by his daughters, Marie-Adélaïde and then by Charlotte (reigned 1919–1964). Her descendants (from her marriage to Prince Felix of Bourbon-Parma) comprise the Grand Ducal House in the 21st century.

== List of monarchs ==
Name and reign	Portrait	Birth	Marriages	Death	Right of Succession
Jean; 12 November 1964 – 7 October 2000		5 January 1921; Colmar-Berg	Joséphine Charlotte of Belgium; 9 April 1953 [5 children]	23 April 2019; Luxembourg City	Eldest child of Grand Duchess Charlotte
Henri; 7 October 2000 – 3 October 2025		16 April 1955; Betzdorf	María Teresa Mestre y Batista; 4 February/14 February 1981 [5 children]	Living	Eldest son, second child
Guillaume V 3 October 2025 – present		11 November 1981; Luxembourg City	Stéphanie de Lannoy; 19 October/20 October 2012 [2 children]	Living	Eldest child

== Titulature ==
The monarch bears the style of Royal Highness (subsumed in the higher style of Majesty that was borne by its sovereigns during the personal union of the grand duchy with the Kingdom of the Netherlands until 1890), to which the heir apparent is also entitled. The other male-line descendants of Grand Duke Adolphe held the titles "Prince/Princess of Luxembourg" and "Prince/Princess of Nassau", with the style of Grand Ducal Highness. Until 1995, the daughters and male-line issue of Grand Duchess Charlotte also bore the title of "Prince/Princess of Bourbon-Parma" and were addressed as Royal Highness, in right of their descent from her consort, Prince Felix of Bourbon-Parma.

On 28 July 1987, by grand ducal decree, members of the dynasty assumed the surname "de Nassau" and discontinued use of the princely title and inescutcheon of the House of Bourbon-Parma (the dukes of which had not consented to the marriages to commoners of the dynasts of their Luxembourg cadet branch, Prince Charles in 1967 and Hereditary Grand Duke Henri in 1981), while retaining the style of Royal Highness.

Since the grand ducal decree of 21 September 1995, dynasts who are the children of a grand duke or hereditary grand duke hold the titles "Prince/Princess of Luxembourg" and "Prince/Princess of Nassau" with the style of Royal Highness. Shortly after his accession to the throne in October 2000, Grand Duke Henri issued a grand ducal decree conferring upon his eldest son and heir, Prince Guillaume, the title of "Hereditary Grand Duke" and restoring to him the title "Prince of Bourbon-Parma". Male line descendants of Grand Duchess Charlotte who are not the children of a grand duke or hereditary grand duke are "Prince/Princess of Nassau" with the style of His/Her Royal Highness.

A grand ducal decree in 2012, concerning the family pact, further defined the rules of titles borne.

The wives, children and male-line descendants of a prince of the dynasty whose marriage has not received grand ducal consent are "Count/Countess de Nassau".

To date, the title of "His/Her Royal Highness Prince/Princess of Bourbon-Parma" has been returned to all legitimate members of the grand ducal family. Indeed, the members of the grand ducal family have never ceased to actually be members of the Royal House of Bourbon-Parma.

== Religion ==
Grand Dukes Adolphe (1817–1905) and William IV (1852–1912) were Evangelical Christians. William married the Catholic Marie Anne of Portugal, believing that a country in which the great majority of people were Catholic should also have a Catholic monarch. In 1907, William declared the Evangelical Counts of Merenberg to be non-dynastic and named his own Catholic daughter, Marie-Adélaïde (1894–1924), heiress to the grand ducal throne; she in 1919 abdicated in favour of her sister, Charlotte (1896–1985), who was also Catholic, and Charlotte's Catholic descendants have reigned in Luxembourg ever since.

However, although Catholicism is the claimed faith of the overwhelming majority of the Luxembourgish people (ca. 90–93%), it does not have the status of a state religion, nor is there any legal or constitutional obligation for the grand duke (as head of state) to be Catholic.

== Living members ==
=== The family of Grand Duke Guillaume V ===
- Grand Duke Guillaume V (b. 1981) is the current grand duke of Luxembourg. He became grand duke when his father abdicated on 3 October 2025. He was married in 2012 to Countess Stéphanie de Lannoy (b. 1984), now Grand Duchess Stéphanie of Luxembourg. They have two sons.
  - Prince Charles of Luxembourg (b. 2020), the Grand Duke's eldest son and heir apparent.
  - Prince François of Luxembourg (b. 2023), the Grand Duke's second son.

=== The family of Grand Duke Henri ===
- Grand Duke Henri (b. 1955), the Grand Duke's father, was the grand duke of Luxembourg from 2000 to 2025. He was married in 1981 to Maria Teresa Mestre y Batista (b. 1956), now Grand Duchess Maria Teresa of Luxembourg. They have five children, including Grand Duke Guillaume.
  - Prince Félix of Luxembourg (b. 1984), the Grand Duke's brother. He was married on 21 September 2013 to Claire Lademacher (b.1985), now Princess Claire of Luxembourg. They have three children.
    - Princess Amalia of Nassau (b. 2014), Prince Félix's only daughter.
    - Prince Liam of Nassau (b. 2016), Prince Félix's eldest son.
    - Prince Balthasar of Nassau (b. 2024), Prince Félix's second son.
  - Prince Louis of Luxembourg (b. 1986), the Grand Duke's brother. Renounced his right of succession for himself and his heirs upon his marriage in 2006. He was married in 2006 to Tessy Antony (b. 1985), later Princess Tessy of Luxembourg, until divorce in 2019, and later Tessy Antony de Nassau. They have two sons.
    - Prince Gabriel of Nassau (b. 2006), Prince Louis's eldest son, born out of wedlock.
    - Prince Noah of Nassau (b. 2007), Prince Louis's second son.
  - Princess Alexandra of Luxembourg (b. 1991), now Princess Alexandra, Mrs. Bagory, the Grand Duke's sister. She was married in 2023 to Nicolas Bagory (b. 1988). They have two children.
    - Victoire Bagory (b. 2024), Princess Alexandra's daughter.
    - Hélie Bagory (b. 2025), Princess Alexandra's son.
  - Prince Sébastien of Luxembourg (b. 1992), the Grand Duke's brother.

=== The family of Grand Duke Jean ===
- Princess Marie Astrid of Luxembourg (b. 1954), now Archduchess Marie Astrid of Austria, the Grand Duke's aunt. She was married in 1982 to Archduke Carl Christian of Austria (b. 1954). They have five children.
  - Archduchess Marie-Christine of Austria (b. 1983), Princess Marie Astrid's eldest daughter. She was married in 2008 to Count Rodolphe de Limburg-Stirum (b. 1979). They have three sons: Count Léopold de Limburg-Stirum (b. 2011), Count Constantin de Limburg-Stirum (b. 2013) and Count Gabriel de Limburg-Stirum (b. 2016).
  - Archduke Imre of Austria (b. 1985), Princess Marie Astrid's eldest son. He was married in 2012 to Kathleen Walker (b. 1986), now Archduchess Kathleen of Austria. They have six children: Archduchess Maria-Stella of Austria (b. 2013), Archduchess Magdalena of Austria (b. 2016), Archduchess Juliana of Austria (b. 2018), Archduchess Cecilia of Austria (b. 2021), Archduke Karl of Austria (b. 2023) and Archduke Benedikt of Austria (b. 2026).
  - Archduke Christoph of Austria (b. 1988), Princess Marie Astrid's second son. He was married in 2012 to Adélaïde Drapé-Frisch (b. 1989), now Archduchess Adélaïde of Austria. They have five children: Archduchess Katarina of Austria (b. 2014), Archduchess Sophia of Austria (b. 2017), Archduke Josef of Austria (b. 2020), Archduchess Flavia of Austria (b. 2023) and Archduke Amedeo of Austria (b. 2024).
  - Archduke Alexander of Austria (b. 1990), Princess Marie Astrid's third son. He was married in 2023 to Natacha Roumiantzeff-Pachkevitch (b. 1992). They separated in 2024 and divorced in 2025 without issue.
  - Archduchess Gabriella of Austria (b. 1994), Princess Marie Astrid's second daughter. She was married in 2020 to Prince Henri of Bourbon-Parma (b. 1991). They have three daughters: Princess Victoria of Bourbon-Parma (b. 2017, out of wedlock), Princess Anastasia of Bourbon-Parma (b. 2021) and Princess Philippine of Bourbon-Parma (b. 2023).
- Prince Jean of Luxembourg (b. 1957), the Grand Duke's uncle. He is the twin brother of Princess Margaretha. Renounced his right of succession for himself and his heirs upon his marriage in 1986. He was married in 1987 to Hélène Vestur (b. 1958), later Countess Hélène of Nassau until divorce in 2004. They have four children. He was married in 2009 to Diane de Guerre (b. 1962), now Countess Diane of Nassau. They have no children.
  - Princess Marie Gabrielle of Nassau (b. 1986), now Princess Marie Gabrielle, Mrs. Willms, Prince Jean's only daughter, born out of wedlock. She was married in 2017 to Antonius Willms (b. 1988). They have three children: Zeno Willms (b. 2018), Cajetan Willms (b. 2020) and Oona Willms (b. 2024).
  - Prince Constantin of Nassau (b. 1988), Prince Jean's eldest son. He was married in 2020 to Kathryn Mechie (b. 1989), now Princess Kathryn of Nassau. They have two children: Prince Felix of Nassau (b. 2018, out of wedlock) and Princess Cosima of Nassau (b. 2022).
  - Prince Wenceslas of Nassau (b. 1990), Prince Jean's second son. He was married in 2021 to Elisabeth Lamarche (b. 1990), now Princess Elisabeth of Nassau. They have one son: Prince Calixte of Nassau (b. 2022).
  - Prince Carl Johann of Nassau (b. 1992), Prince Jean's third son. He was married in 2019 to Ivanna Jamin (b. 1994), now Princess Ivanna of Nassau. They have two children: Prince Xander of Nassau (b. 2021) and Princess Amadea of Nassau (b. 2022).
- Princess Margaretha of Luxembourg (b. 1957), now Princess Margaretha of Liechtenstein, the Grand Duke's aunt. She is the twin sister of Prince Jean. She was married in 1982 to Prince Nikolaus of Liechtenstein (b. 1947). They have three surviving children.
  - Princess Maria-Anunciata of Liechtenstein (b. 1985), now Princess Maria-Anunciata, Mrs. Musini, Princess Margaretha's eldest daughter. She was married in 2021 to Carlo Emanuele Musini (b. 1979). They have two children: Georgina Musini (b. 2023) and Constantino Musini (b. 2026).
  - Princess Marie-Astrid of Liechtenstein (b. 1987), now Princess Marie-Astrid, Mrs. Worthington, Princess Margaretha's second daughter. She was married in 2021 to Ralph Worthington V (b. 1985). They have two daughters: Althaea Worthington (b. 2022) and Aloisia Worthington (b. 2023).
  - Prince Josef-Emanuel of Liechtenstein (b. 1989), Princess Margaretha's second son. He was married in 2022 to María Claudia “Cloclo” Echavarría Suárez (b. 1988), now Princess María Claudia of Liechtenstein. They have two sons: Prince Leopold of Liechtenstein (b. 2023) and Prince Nikolai of Liechtenstein (b. 2025).
- Prince Guillaume of Luxembourg (b. 1963), the Grand Duke's uncle. He was married in 1994 to Sibilla Weiller (b. 1968, daughter of Donna Olimpia Torlonia dei principi di Civitella-Cesi and Paul-Annik Weiller, great-granddaughter of King Alfonso XIII of Spain), now Princess Sibilla of Luxembourg. They have four children.
  - Prince Paul-Louis of Nassau (b. 1998), Prince Guillaume's eldest son.
  - Prince Léopold of Nassau (b. 2000), Prince Guillaume's second son. He is the twin brother of Princess Charlotte.
  - Princess Charlotte of Nassau (b. 2000), Prince Guillaume's only daughter. She is the twin sister of Prince Léopold.
  - Prince Jean André of Nassau (b. 2004), Prince Guillaume's youngest son.

=== The family of Grand Duchess Charlotte ===
- Princess Joan of Luxembourg (b. 1935, née Dillon), the Grand Duke's great-aunt-in-law. She is the widow of Prince Charles of Luxembourg (1927-1977). They married in 1967 and have two children.
  - Princess Charlotte of Luxembourg (b. 1967), now Princess Charlotte, Mrs. Cunningham, Prince Charles's only daughter. She was married in 1993 to Marc Victor Cunningham (b. 1965). They have three sons: Charles Cunningham (b. 1996), Louis Cunningham (b. 1998) and Donnall Cunningham (b. 2002).
  - Prince Robert of Luxembourg (b. 1968), Prince Charles's only son. He was married in 1993 to Julie Ongaro (b. 1966), now Princess Julie of Luxembourg. They have two surviving children: Princess Charlotte of Nassau (b. 1995, married in 2025 to Nicolas Shakarchi, b. 1997) and Prince Alexandre of Nassau (b. 1997).

== Succession to the throne ==
The preference for men over women in succession to Luxembourg's throne was abandoned in favour of absolute primogeniture on 20 June 2011 by decree of Grand Duke Henri. Henceforth, any legitimate female descendant of the House of Luxembourg-Nassau born of authorized marriage shall inherit the throne by order of seniority of line of descent and of birth as stipulated in Article 3 of the Constitution and the Nassau Family Pact without regard to gender, applicable first to succession by the descendants of Grand Duke Henri. The Grand Duke's marshal issued an addendum to the decree explaining the context of the change: pursuant to the United Nations' 1979 call for nations to eliminate all forms of discrimination against women, in 2008 the grand duchy dropped the exception to gender non-discrimination it had declared in the matter of the grand ducal succession.

== Summary family tree ==
For the ancestry of the House of Nassau, see Family Tree of the House of Nassau.

Family tree of the House of Luxembourg-Nassau

Adolphe (1817–1905); Duke of Nassau r. 1839–1866; Grand Duke of Luxembourg r. 1890–1905	Adelheid-Marie; Princess of Anhalt-Dessau
William IV (1852–1912); Grand Duke of Luxembourg r. 1905–1912	Marie Anne; Infanta of Portugal
Marie-Adélaïde (1894–1924); Grand Duchess of Luxembourg r. 1912–1919	Charlotte (1896–1985); Grand Duchess of Luxembourg r. 1919–1964	Felix; Prince of Bourbon-Parma
Jean (1921–2019); Grand Duke of Luxembourg r. 1964–2000	Joséphine-Charlotte; Princess of Belgium	Charles; Prince of Luxembourg
Marie-Astrid; Archduchess of Austria	Henri (1955–present); Grand Duke of Luxembourg r. 2000–2025	Maria Teresa Mestre	Jean; Prince of Luxembourg	Margaretha; Princess of Liechtenstein	Guillaume; Prince of Luxembourg
Guillaume V (1981–present); Grand Duke of Luxembourg r. 2025–present	Stéphanie; Countess de Lannoy	Félix; Prince of Luxembourg	Louis; Prince of Luxembourg	Alexandra; Princess of Luxembourg	Sébastien; Prince of Luxembourg
Charles; Prince of Luxembourg	François; Prince of Luxembourg

== Arms ==
See also: Category:SVG coats of arms of Luxembourg

A complete armorial is given at the Armorial de la Maison de Nassau, section Lignée Valramienne at the French Wikipedia, and another one at Wapen van Nassau, Tak van Walram at the Dutch Wikipedia.

== See also ==
- List of monarchs of Luxembourg
- Line of succession to the throne of Luxembourg
