= Betzdorf Castle =

- Schlass Betzder
- Location within Luxembourg

General information
- Type: Castle
- Location: Betzdorf, Luxembourg
- Coordinates: 49°41′39″N 06°19′49″E
- Owner: SES

Betzdorf Castle (Luxembourgish: Schlass Betzder; French: Château de Betzdorf; German: Schloss Betzdorf) is a castle in the commune of Betzdorf, in eastern Luxembourg. It is located north-west of Betzdorf village, to the north of the CFL Line 30 railway line.

The castle is the headquarters of SES, the world's largest satellite operator in terms of revenue and the largest component of Luxembourg Stock Exchange's main LuxX Index. Since its acquisition by SES, the company has built a large commercial and industrial centre on the castle estate.

It should not be confused with Berg Castle, located in nearby Colmar-Berg, which serves as the communal headquarters for Betzdorf.

== History ==
The castle was the home of Hereditary Grand Duke Jean from the time of his marriage to Joséphine-Charlotte of Belgium, on 9 April 1953, until 16 November 1964, when he succeeded to the Grand Duchy upon Grand Duchess Charlotte's resignation. All of Jean and Joséphine-Charlotte's children were born at Betzdorf Castle:

- Princess Marie-Astrid (born 17 February 1954)
- Grand Duke Henri (born 16 April 1955)
- Prince Jean and Princess Margaretha (twins born 15 May 1957)
- Prince Guillaume (born 1 May 1963)

After it was vacated by the new Grand Duke's family, the castle became a nursing home, which it remained until 1982. In July of that year, the castle served as a base camp for 3,000 Scouts celebrating the 75th anniversary of the movement's foundation.

Afterwards, it was left empty until SES bought the castle in 1986 and began extensive development work to make it the company's headquarters. According to SES, the castle was ideal as it was remote enough that it would be free of interference for their satellite ground station, Betzdorf Satellite Control Facility, which became operational in July 1987, albeit without a satellite.

== See also ==
- List of castles in Luxembourg
