= Princess Marie-Astrid of Liechtenstein =

Liechtensteiner princess

Princess Marie-Astrid
- Born: June 26, 1987 (age 39); Uccle, Brussels, Belgium
- Spouse: Ralph Worthington V (m. 2021)
- Issue: Althaea Worthington; Aloisia Worthington; Anselm Worthington
Names
- Marie-Astrid Nora Margarita Veronica
- House: Liechtenstein
- Father: Prince Nikolaus of Liechtenstein
- Mother: Princess Margaretha of Luxembourg

Styles of Princess Maria-Anunciata of Liechtenstein
- Reference style: Her Serene Highness
- Spoken style: Your Serene Highness

Princess Marie-Astrid of Liechtenstein (Marie-Astrid Nora Margarita Veronica; born 26 June 1987) is a member of the Princely family of Liechtenstein. She is the niece of Henri, Grand Duke of Luxembourg, and Hans-Adam II, Prince of Liechtenstein.

== Early life and family ==
Marie-Astrid was born on 26 June 1987 in Uccle, Belgium to Prince Nikolaus of Liechtenstein and his wife, Princess Margaretha of Luxembourg. Her father is the third son of Franz Joseph II and the younger brother of Hans-Adam II. Her mother is the daughter of Jean, Grand Duke of Luxembourg and Princess Joséphine-Charlotte of Belgium. Marie-Astrid is the sister of Princess Maria-Anunciata, and Prince Josef-Emmanuel.

== Education and career ==
Marie-Astrid has a diploma from Le Cordon Bleu in London and a masters degree in business administration from the London School of Business and Finance.

She worked as an event manager in London. She founded AvL Backgammon, a boardgame company that makes backgammon sets. Her company donates a portion of their profits to the International Red Cross.

== Personal life ==
On 25 September 2021, Marie-Astrid married the American businessman Ralph Worthington V, born on 5 April 1985, in a Catholic ceremony at the Cathedral of Santa Maria Assunta in Orbetello, Italy. She wore the 19th-century Kinsky Honeysuckle tiara for the occasion. Wedding guests included Prince Christian of Hanover and Princess Christian of Hanover; Ekaterina, Hereditary Princess of Hanover; Princess Mafalda of Hesse; and Prince Lorenz and Princess Maria Laura of Belgium.

The couple have two daughters and a son:Althaea Georgina, Aloisia, Anselm Nikolaus Ralph Talmage.
