= Princess Maria-Anunciata of Liechtenstein =

Liechtensteiner royal

Princess Maria-Anunciata
- Born: May 12, 1985 (age 41); Uccle, Brussels, Belgium
- Spouse: Carlo Emanuele Musini (m. 2021)
- Issue: Georgina Musini
Names
- Maria-Anunciata Astrid Joséphine Veronica
- House: Liechtenstein
- Father: Prince Nikolaus of Liechtenstein
- Mother: Princess Margaretha of Luxembourg
- Occupation: art curator

Styles of Princess Maria-Anunciata of Liechtenstein
- Reference style: Her Serene Highness
- Spoken style: Your Serene Highness

Princess Maria-Anunciata of Liechtenstein (Maria-Anunciata Astrid Joséphine Veronica; born 12 May 1985) is an art curator and member of the Princely Family of Liechtenstein.

== Early life and family ==
Princess Maria-Anunciata was born on 12 May 1985 in Uccle to Prince Nikolaus of Liechtenstein and Princess Margaretha of Luxembourg. Maria-Anunciata is the sister of Prince Leopold, Princess Marie-Astrid, and Prince Josef-Emmanuel and the granddaughter of Franz Joseph II, Prince of Liechtenstein and of Jean, Grand Duke of Luxembourg.

She spent summers of her childhood in Cabasson, a hamlet in Var, Provence-Alpes-Côte d'Azur.

== Career ==
Maria-Anunciata works as an art researcher and curator. She has curated exhibits for museums and independent projects in Paris, Rome, and New York City and was employed by the art publishing house Cahiers d'Art.

In 2016, she worked with Valentina Moncada and Olivier Berggruen to create a Pablo Picasso retrospective exhibition at the Scuderie del Quirinale in Rome. It marked the centenary of the artist's trip to Rome and Naples with Jean Cocteau and the Ballets Russes.

== Personal life ==
Maria-Anunciata married American businessman Carlo Emanuele Musini in a civil ceremony on 26 June 2021 at the Villa della Tenuta di Fassia in Gubbio, Italy. Their Catholic wedding took place on 4 September 2021 in Vienna at the Schottenkirche. She wore the Habsburg fringe tiara and a Valentino gown. For the reception, which was held at the Liechtenstein Garden Palace, Maria-Anunciata loaned the Luxembourg vine leaves tiara. Many members of the Grand Ducal Family of Luxembourg attended the wedding. King Philippe and Queen Mathilde of Belgium were supposed to attend, but tested positive for COVID-19.

On 10 January 2023, Maria-Anunciata attended the funeral of Constantine II of Greece at the Metropolitan Cathedral of Athens.
