= Henri, Grand Duke of Luxembourg =

Grand Duke of Luxembourg from 2000 to 2025

Henri
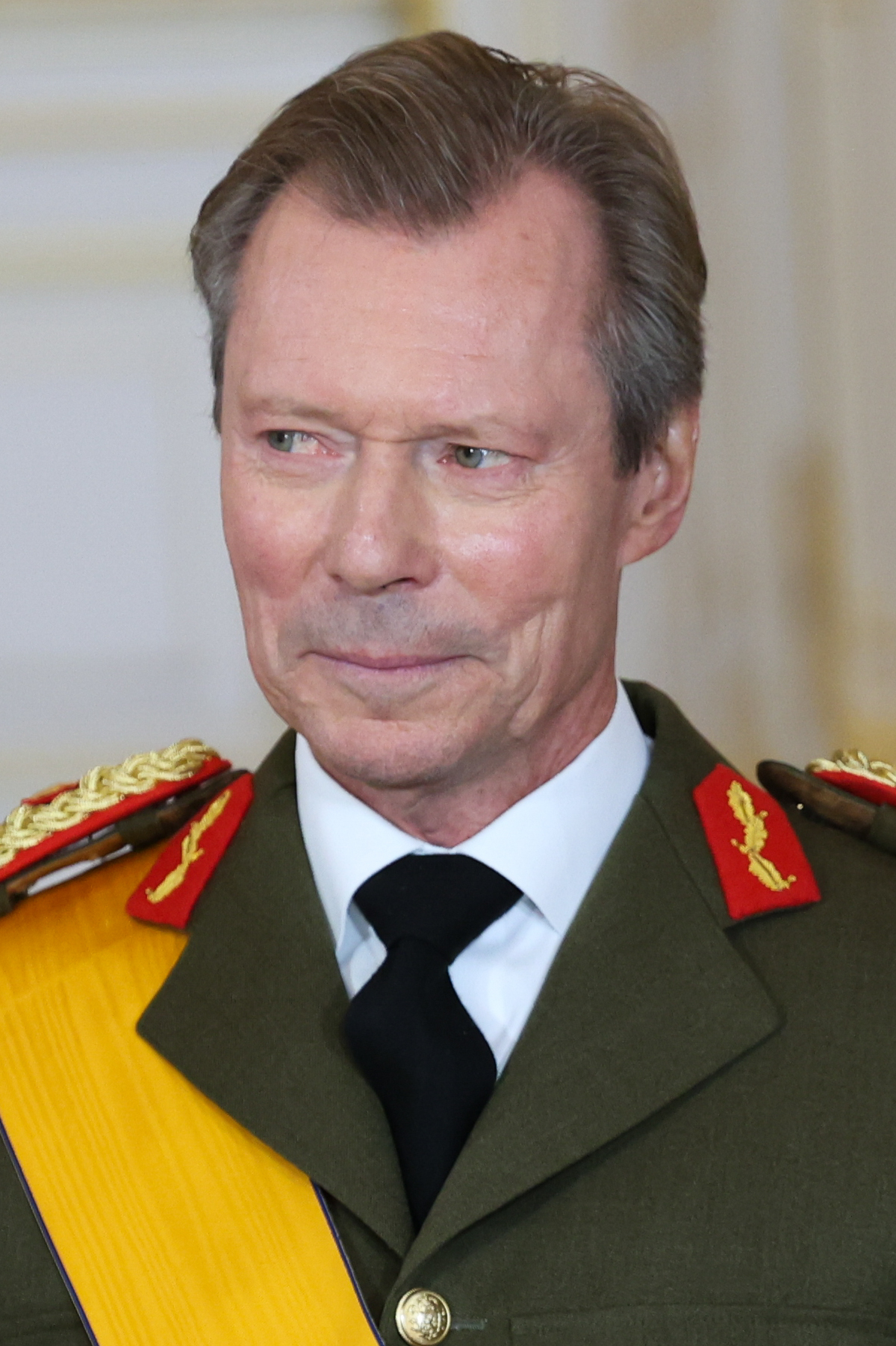
- Henri in 2025

Grand Duke of Luxembourg
- Reign: 7 October 2000 – 3 October 2025
- Enthronement: 7 October 2000
- Predecessor: Jean
- Successor: Guillaume V
- Regent: Guillaume (2024–2025)

Regent of Luxembourg
- Regency: 4 March 1998 – 7 October 2000
- Monarch: Jean
- Prime Ministers: See list: Jean-Claude Juncker
- Born: 16 April 1955 (age 71); Betzdorf Castle, Betzdorf, Luxembourg
- Spouse: María Teresa Mestre y Batista (m. 1981)
- Issue: Guillaume V, Grand Duke of Luxembourg; Prince Félix; Prince Louis; Princess Alexandra; Prince Sébastien
Names
- Henri Albert Gabriel Félix Marie Guillaume
- House: Luxembourg-Nassau (official); Bourbon-Parma (agnatic)
- Father: Jean, Grand Duke of Luxembourg
- Mother: Princess Joséphine-Charlotte of Belgium

Henri (Note: Luxembourgish pronunciation: [ˈhɑ̃ːʀi]) (French: Henri Albert Gabriel Félix Marie Guillaume; born 16 April 1955) is a member of the grand ducal family of Luxembourg who reigned as Grand Duke of Luxembourg from 2000 until his abdication in 2025.

Henri was born during the reign of his paternal grandmother, Grand Duchess Charlotte, as the second child and eldest son of the future Grand Duke Jean and Princess Joséphine-Charlotte of Belgium. He became heir apparent upon the accession of his father in 1964 at the age of nine, and was officially created hereditary grand duke on his 18th birthday in 1973. Henri was educated in Luxembourg and France, where he received his Baccalauréat in 1974. He then undertook military officer training at the Royal Military Academy Sandhurst, on the Standard Military Course (SMC) 7, and then studied political science at University of Geneva and the Graduate Institute of International Studies, graduating in 1980.

In 1998, he was appointed as regent by his father, the traditional first step in the transition of reigns. Two years later, Jean abdicated and Henri became grand duke. Henri's role was largely ceremonial as a constitutional monarch. However, he sparked a minor constitutional crisis in 2008 when he refused to grant royal assent to a new euthanasia law, resulting in the requirement for laws to receive his assent being abolished. In October 2024, Henri appointed his son Guillaume as regent, and abdicated the throne the following year.

== Early life and education ==
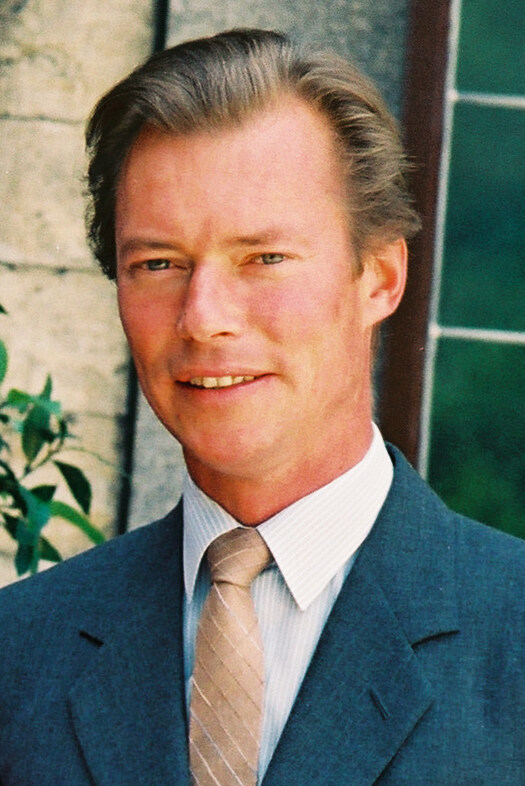
Henri in 1989

Prince Henri was born on 16 April 1955, at the Betzdorf Castle in Luxembourg as the second child and first son of Jean, Hereditary Grand Duke of Luxembourg, and his wife, Princess Joséphine-Charlotte of Belgium. His father was the eldest son of Charlotte, Grand Duchess of Luxembourg, and Prince Félix of Bourbon-Parma. His mother was the only daughter of King Leopold III of Belgium by his first wife, Princess Astrid of Sweden. The prince's godparents were his maternal uncle the Prince of Liège (later Albert II of Belgium) and his paternal aunt Princess Marie Gabriele.

Henri has four siblings: Archduchess Marie Astrid of Austria (born 1954), Prince Jean of Luxembourg (born 1957), Princess Margaretha of Liechtenstein (born 1957) and Prince Guillaume of Luxembourg (born 1963).

On 12 November 1964, when Henri was nine, his grandmother abdicated and his father became grand duke. By two sovereign decisions of 14 April 1973, Jean decided that "Henri will be considered as having reached the age of majority as from 16 April 1973, the date on which he will have reached the age of eighteen years" and "that His Royal Highness Prince Henri will bear, in His capacity as Heir Apparent to the Crown of the Grand Duchy of Luxembourg and of the Grand Ducal Trust, the title of Hereditary Grand Duke of Luxembourg, Hereditary Prince of Nassau, Prince of Bourbon of Parma."

Henri was educated in Luxembourg and in France, where he obtained his Baccalauréat in 1974, after which he undertook military officer training at the Royal Military Academy Sandhurst, England on the Standard Military Course (SMC) 7. He then studied political science at University of Geneva and the Graduate Institute of International Studies, graduating in 1980.

Prince Henri became heir apparent to the Luxembourg throne on the abdication of his paternal grandmother, Grand Duchess Charlotte of Luxembourg, on 12 November 1964. From 1980 to his nomination as regent in 1998, he was a member of the Council of State.

== Reign ==
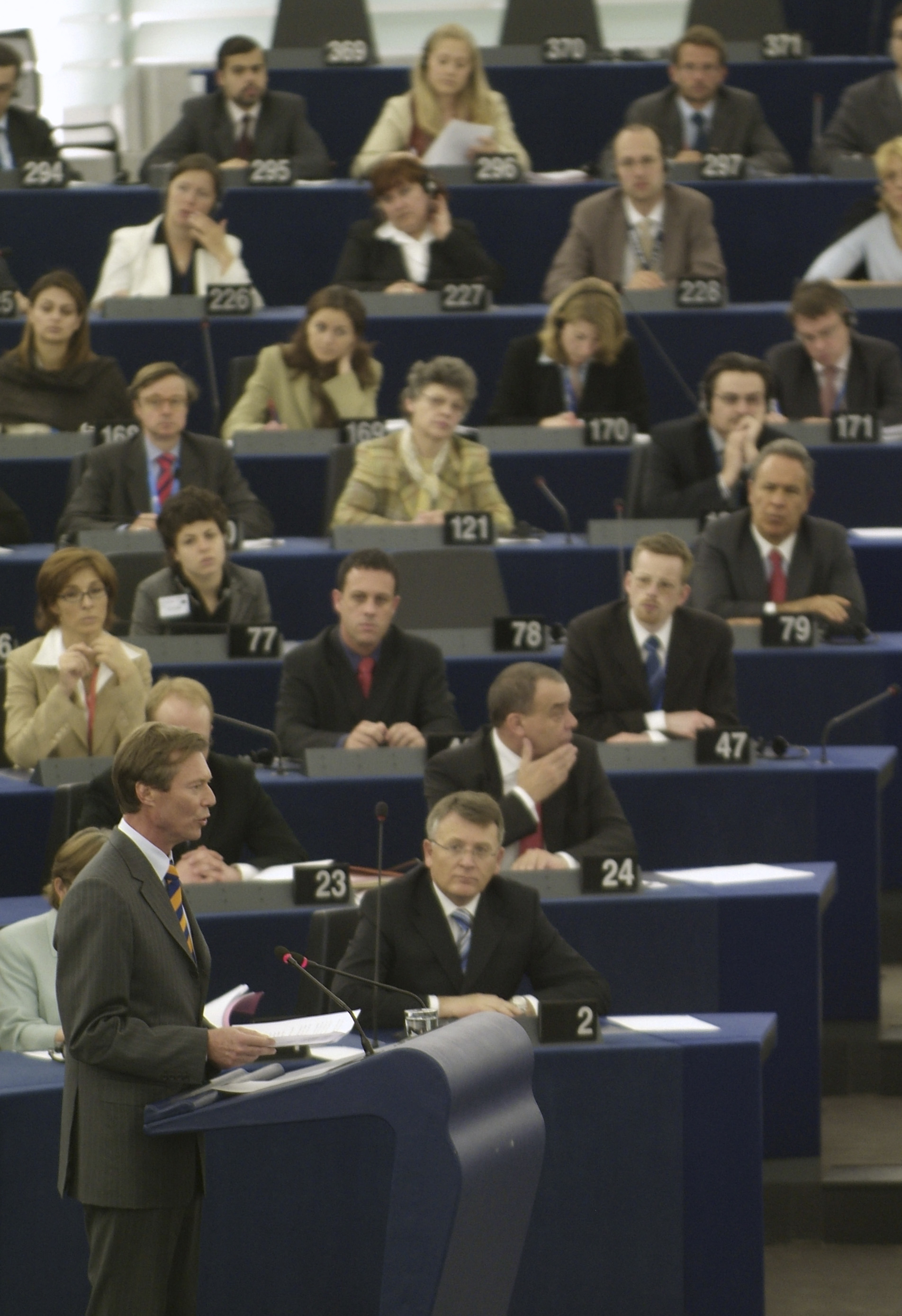
Grand Duke Henri addressing the European Parliament in Strasbourg in 2005

=== Accession ===
On 4 March 1998, Prince Henri was appointed as lieutenant-representative by his father, Grand Duke Jean, meaning that he assumed most of his father's constitutional powers. On 7 October 2000, immediately following the abdication of his father, Henri acceded as Grand Duke of Luxembourg and took the constitutional oath before the Chamber of Deputies later that day.

=== Role and interests ===
Grand Duke Henri's royal monogram

As the head of a constitutional monarchy, Grand Duke Henri's duties were primarily representative. However, he retained the constitutional power to appoint the prime minister and government, to dissolve the Chamber of Deputies, to promulgate laws and to accredit ambassadors. With few exceptions, however, he was bound by convention to act on the advice of the government. Grand Duke Henri was commander-in-chief of the Luxembourg Army, in which he holds the rank of general. In addition, he was made an honorary major in the British Army's Parachute Regiment, effective 19 July 1989.

One of the grand duke's main functions is to represent Luxembourg in the field of foreign affairs. In May 2001, Grand Duke Henri and Grand Duchess Maria Teresa undertook their first foreign state visit to Spain at the invitation of King Juan Carlos and Queen Sofía of Spain.

Grand Duke Henri is a member of the International Olympic Committee (IOC), a member of The Mentor Foundation (established by the World Health Organization) and a director of the Charles Darwin Trust for the Galápagos Islands.

During his reign, Henri lived with his family at Berg Castle in Colmar-Berg. He also has a holiday home in Cabasson, a village in the commune of Bormes-les-Mimosas in Southern France.

Henri was alleged by Business Insider to be one of the world's richest monarchs, with a net worth estimated around US$4 billion in 2019, though representatives of the grand duke's administration have disputed this claim as seeming to incorrectly account for historical and cultural property not actually owned by the grand ducal family, and claimed that the real value of their net worth was "a fraction of these $4 billion".

=== Media and publicity controversies ===
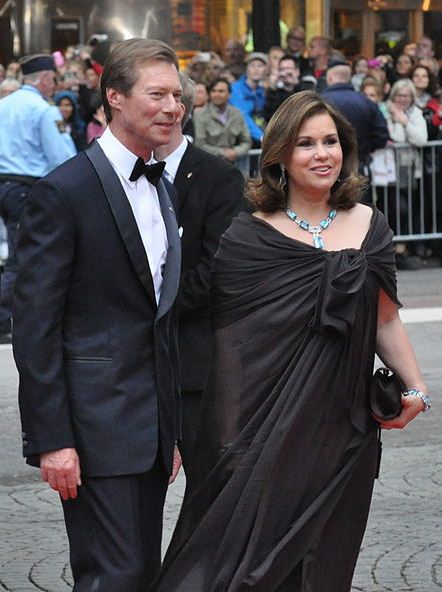
The grand duke and grand duchess at the wedding of the Crown Princess of Sweden in 2010

Since the accession of Henri to the Grand Ducal Throne in 2000, the court's approach to media and publicity has varied markedly. In 2002, Grand Duke Henri expressly identified himself with a press conference called by Maria Teresa with a view to discussing with journalists the shortcomings of her personal relations with her mother-in-law Grand Duchess Joséphine-Charlotte.

In contrast, when the grand ducal couple's first grandchild was born in 2006, the Court Circular pointedly omitted to mention the event, probably as the father Prince Louis was not married at the time. However, the pregnancy was announced in 2005, so the country was informed that the prince and his girlfriend were going to be parents. The press also had access to the child's baptism.

The grand ducal family's approach to media and publicity issues has given rise to media comment regarding the quality of communications advice which has been sought and followed. As well as the public airing of the difficulties between the grand duchess and her mother-in-law, several other events have resulted in adverse publicity, most notably: in 2004, the opening of parliament by the grand duke in person, the first time in over 100 years the monarch had done so; in 2005, the grand duke announced he intended to vote in favour of the European Constitution in the impending referendum, only to be reminded by senior politicians that he had no such right. The proposed sale of large tracts of the Gruenewald in the summer of 2006 was shortly followed by the proposed sale (cancelled shortly afterwards) at Sotheby's of recently deceased Grand Duchess Joséphine-Charlotte's effects.

=== Euthanasia and constitutional reform controversies ===
On 2 December 2008, it was announced that Grand Duke Henri had stated he would refuse to give his assent to a new law on euthanasia that had been passed earlier in the year by the Chamber of Deputies. Under the constitution then, the grand duke "sanctions and promulgates the laws" meaning the need for the grand duke's sanction or approval was required in order for laws to take effect. In the absence of clarity on the long-term implications for the constitutional position of the grand duke posed by such a refusal, it was announced by Prime Minister Jean-Claude Juncker that a constitutional amendment would be brought forward.

The Luxembourg ruling house had tried to block a decision by Parliament only once before, when Grand Duchess Marie-Adélaïde refused to sign a bill in 1912 to reduce the role of Roman Catholic priests within the education system. The ultimate solution was that the grand duke would be declared unable to perform his duty temporarily. This was similar to the "escape route" provided to his uncle King Baudouin of Belgium when he refused to sign an abortion law in 1991; thus the law could take effect without the signature of the grand duke, but also without the need to enact far-reaching changes in the constitution.

Article 34 of the constitution was subsequently amended to remove the term "assent", leaving the relevant provision to read: "The Grand Duke promulgates the laws..." As a result, his signature is still needed but it is clear that his signature is automatic and that he has no freedom of decision. The head of state no longer has to "sanction" laws for them to take effect, as the officeholder merely promulgates them.

=== Health issues ===
On 3 February 2011, Henri felt ill after waking. The court physician determined the grand duke was having some kind of blood circulation problem. An ambulance rushed him to the cardiac unit of the Centre Hospitalier de Luxembourg. Shortly after, the Grand Ducal Court issued a statement that he was to undergo a balloon angioplasty without divulging further information about the underlying condition that required it, although one Luxembourgish newspaper claimed he had had a cardiac arrest. The day after the angioplasty, the communications chief announced the procedure had been a success. "The state of His Royal Highness' health is not disturbing," the statement read, adding that the grand duke might be able to leave the hospital within the next few days, as indeed he did.

=== Waringo report ===
On 31 January 2020, the Waringo report was released, a governmental report on the internal workings of the monarchy that had been compiled by Jeannot Waringo, former Financial Director of Luxembourg. The report identified significant problems in terms of staff management at the Palace resulting in a high turnover rate and an atmosphere of fear. It noted that internal communications were almost nonexistent. Waringo indicated that the most important staff decisions were made by the Grand Duchess. There was no division of staff for personal use and that for official functions. Waringo was also not able to determine if the grand ducal couple's private activities were financed by the State or not. The Court responded that "(i)n the interests of greater transparency and modernization, the Court will contribute constructively to the implementation of the improvements proposed in this report."

=== Abdication ===
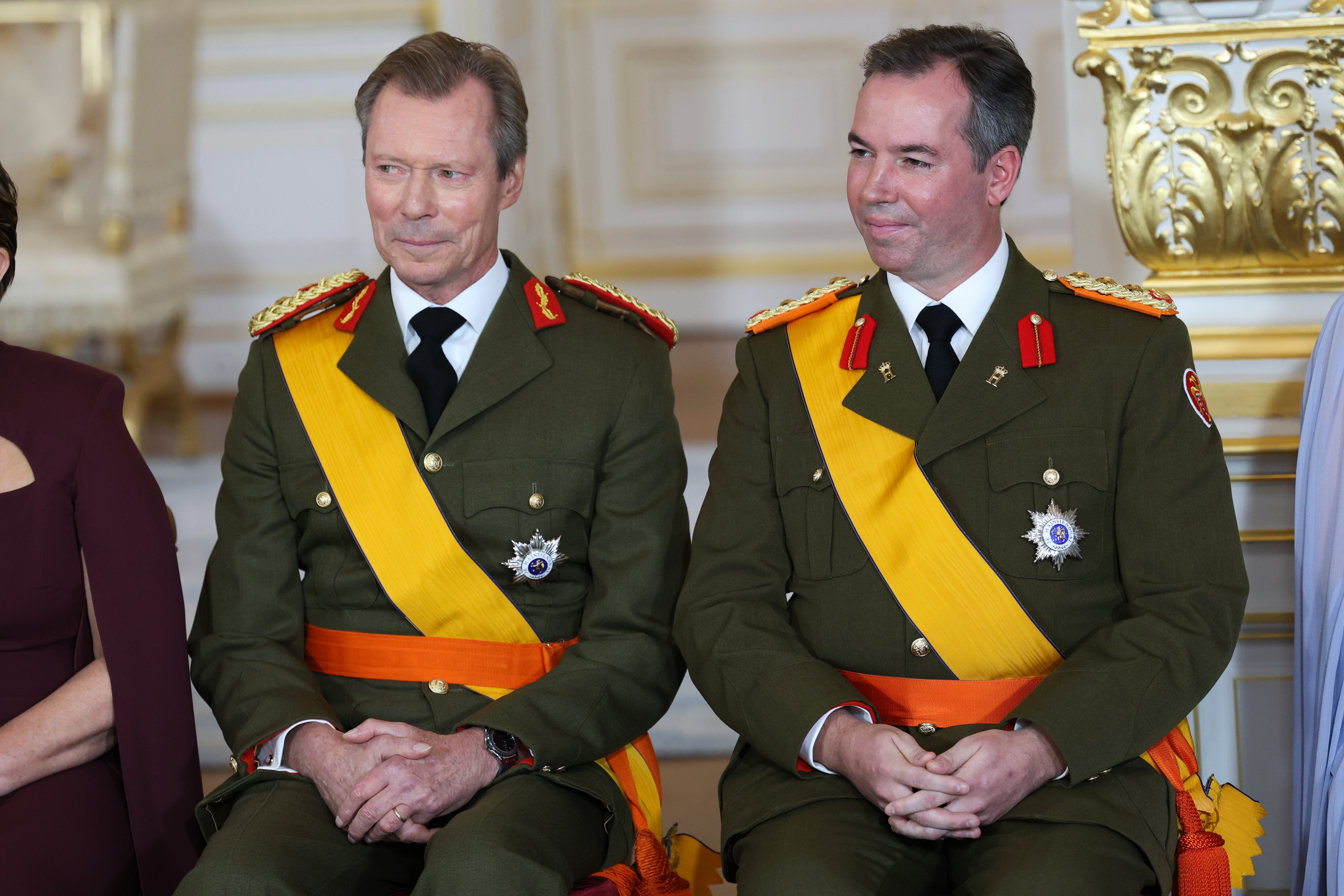
Henri sitting with Guillaume at his abdication ceremony.

On 23 June 2024, his official birthday, Henri announced his plans to appoint his son Guillaume as lieutenant representative (regent) in October. Traditionally, this signals the grand duke's intention to abdicate in the future. On 8 October, Guillaume was sworn in as lieutenant representative. On 24 December 2024, Henri announced in his Christmas message his intention to abdicate in favour of Hereditary Grand Duke Guillaume on 3 October 2025.

Following his abdication, Henri stated that he would be leaving Luxembourg "for a while".

== Marriage and family ==
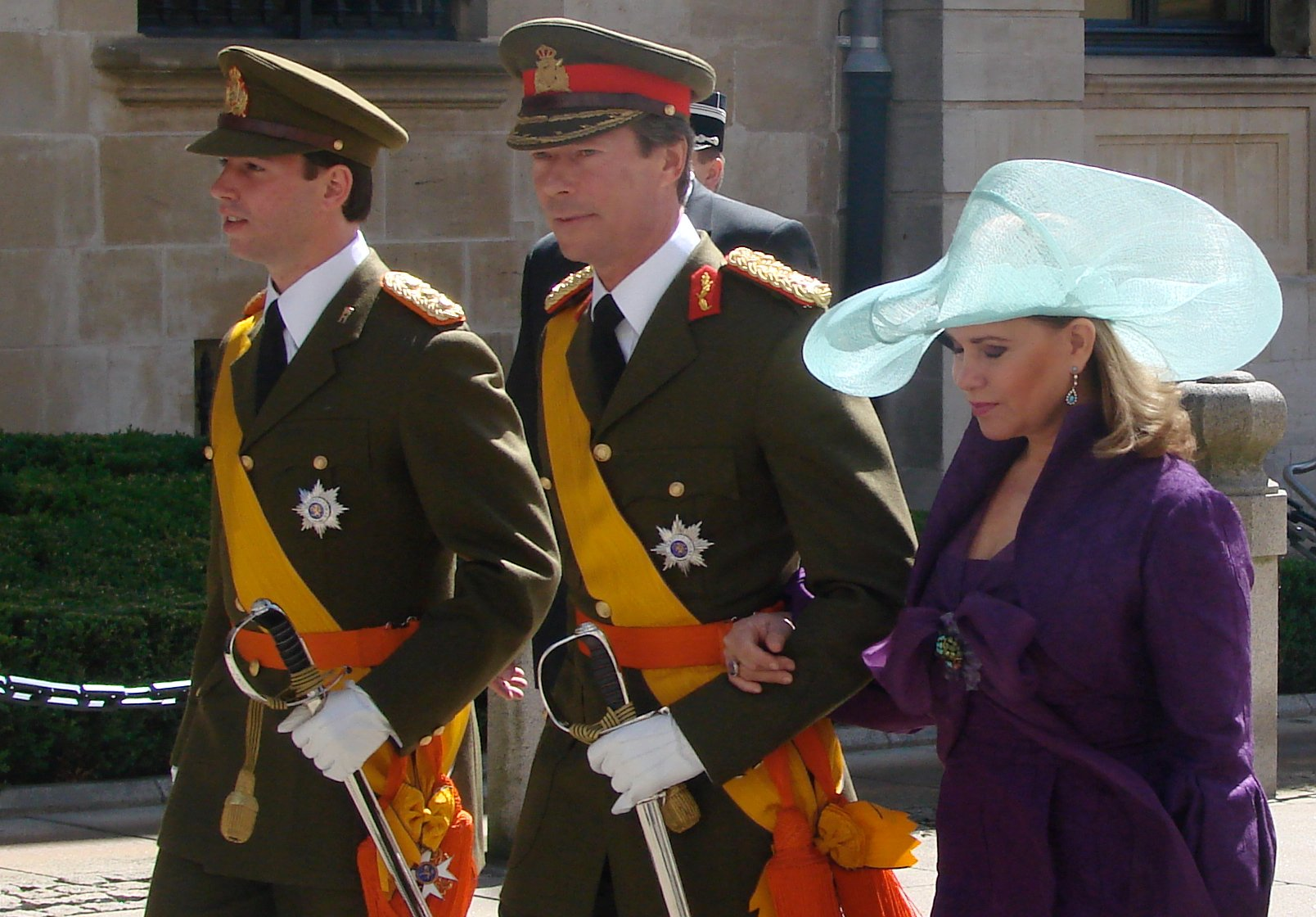
The Grand Duke with his wife and heir apparent

While studying in Geneva, Henri met the Cuban-born María Teresa Mestre y Batista, who was also a political science student. They married in Luxembourg in a civil ceremony on 4 February 1981 and a religious ceremony on 14 February 1981 with the previous consent of the grand duke, dated 7 November 1980. The couple have five children and nine grandchildren:

- Guillaume V (born on 11 November 1981 at the Grand Duchess Charlotte Maternity Hospital, Luxembourg City, Luxembourg). He succeed his father, Henri of Luxembourg as Grand duke of Luxembourg on 3 October 2025. He married Countess Stéphanie Marie Claudine Christine de Lannoy (born on 18 February 1984, Ronse, East Flanders, Belgium) on 20 October 2012. They have two sons:
  - Prince Charles Jean Philippe Joseph Marie Guillaume of Luxembourg (born on 10 May 2020 at the Grand Duchess Charlotte Maternity Hospital, Luxembourg City, Luxembourg).
  - Prince François Henri Louis Marie Guillaume of Luxembourg (born on 27 March 2023 at the Grand Duchess Charlotte Maternity Hospital, Luxembourg City, Luxembourg).
- Prince Félix Léopold Marie Guillaume of Luxembourg (born on 3 June 1984 at the Grand Duchess Charlotte Maternity Hospital, Luxembourg City, Luxembourg). He married Claire Margareta Lademacher (born on 21 March 1985, Filderstadt, Baden-Württemberg, West Germany) on 21 September 2013. They have two sons and one daughter:
  - Princess Amalia Gabriela Maria Teresa of Nassau (born on 15 June 2014 at the Grand Duchess Charlotte Maternity Hospital, Luxembourg City, Luxembourg).
  - Prince Liam Henri Hartmut of Nassau (born on 28 November 2016 at the Clinique Générale-Beaulieu in Geneva, Switzerland).
  - Prince Balthazar Félix Karl of Nassau (born on 7 January 2024 at the Grand Duchess Charlotte Maternity Hospital, Luxembourg City, Luxembourg).
- Prince Louis Xavier Marie Guillaume of Luxembourg, (born on 3 August 1986 at the Grand Duchess Charlotte Maternity Hospital, Luxembourg City, Luxembourg). He married Tessy Antony (born on 28 October 1985, Luxembourg City, Luxembourg) on 29 September 2006 and divorced on 4 April 2019. They have two sons:
  - Prince Gabriel Michael Louis Ronny of Nassau (born on 12 March 2006 at the Clinic des Grangettes, in Geneva, Switzerland).
  - Prince Noah Etienne Guillaume Gabriel Matthias Xavier of Nassau (born on 21 September 2007 at the Grand Duchess Charlotte Maternity Hospital, Luxembourg City, Luxembourg).
- Princess Alexandra Joséphine Teresa Charlotte Marie Wilhelmine of Luxembourg, (born on 16 February 1991 at the Grand Duchess Charlotte Maternity Hospital, Luxembourg City, Luxembourg). She married Nicolas Jacques Armel Bagory (born on 11 November 1988, Brittany, France) on 29 April 2023. They have a daughter and a son:
  - Victoire Bagory (born on 14 May 2024, in Paris, France).
  - Hélie Bagory (born on 17 October 2025)
- Prince Sébastien Henri Marie Guillaume of Luxembourg, (born on 16 April 1992 at the Grand Duchess Charlotte Maternity Hospital, Luxembourg City, Luxembourg).

== Titles, styles and honours ==
=== Titles and styles ===
- 16 April 1955 – 16 April 1973: His Royal Highness Prince Henri of Luxembourg
- 16 April 1973 – 7 October 2000: His Royal Highness The Hereditary Grand Duke of Luxembourg
- 7 October 2000 – 3 October 2025: His Royal Highness The Grand Duke of Luxembourg
- 3 October 2025 - Present: His Royal Highness Grand Duke Henri of Luxembourg

=== Honours ===
==== National honours ====
- Knight and Grand Master (2000–2025) of the Order of the Gold Lion of the House of Nassau (12 November 1964)
- Grand Cross and Grand Master (2000–2025) of the Order of Civil and Military Merit of Adolph of Nassau (16 April 1955, since birth)
- Grand Cross and Grand Master (2000–2025) of the Order of the Oak Crown (7 October 2000)
- Grand Cross and Grand Master (2000–2025) of the Order of Merit of the Grand Duchy of Luxembourg (7 October 2000)

==== Foreign honours ====
- Austria: Grand Star of the Decoration of Honour for Services to the Republic of Austria (15 April 2013)
- Belgium: Grand Cordon of the Order of Leopold (17 March 1994)
- Brazil: Grand Collar of the National Order of the Southern Cross (3 December 2007)
- Cape Verde: Grand Cross of the Order of Amílcar Cabral (12 March 2015)
- Denmark: Knight of the Order of the Elephant (12 March 2015)
- Estonia: Collar of the Order of the Cross of Terra Mariana (5 May 2003)
- Finland: Grand Cross with Collar of the Order of the White Rose of Finland (24 November 2008)
- France: Grand Cross of the National Order of the Legion of Honour
- Germany: Grand Cross special class of the Order of Merit of the Federal Republic of Germany (23 April 2012)
- Greece: Grand Cross of the Order of the Redeemer (10 July 2001)
- Holy See: Knight with the Collar of the Order of Pope Pius IX (21 March 2005)
- Italy: Knight Grand Cross with Collar of the Order of Merit of the Italian Republic (14 March 2003)
- Japan: Collar of the Supreme Order of the Chrysanthemum (27 November 2017)
- Latvia:
  - Commander Grand Cross with Chain of the Order of the Three Stars (4 December 2006)
  - Commander Grand Cross of the Cross of Recognition (13 March 2023)
- Mali: Grand Cross of the National Order of Mali (9 November 2005)
- Sovereign Military Order of Malta: Bailiff Grand Cross of Honour and Devotion of the Order of Knights of the Hospital of Saint John of Jerusalem
- Norway: Grand Cross with Collar of the Royal Norwegian Order of St. Olav (18 April 1996)
- Netherlands:
  - Knight Grand Cross of the Order of the Netherlands Lion (21 April 2006)
  - Grand Cross of the Order of the Crown
- Poland: Knight of the Order of the White Eagle (30 April 2014)
- Portugal:
  - Grand Collar of the Order of Prince Henry (6 May 2005)
  - Grand Collar of the Military Order of Saint James of the Sword (7 September 2010)
  - Grand Collar of the Order of Liberty (23 May 2017)
  - Grand Collar of the Military Order of Christ (11 May 2022)
- Romania: Collar of the Order of the Star of Romania (10 October 2004)
- Senegal: Grand Cross of the National Order of the Lion (21 January 2018)
- Slovakia: Grand Cross of the Order of the White Double Cross (9 October 2002)
- Spain:
  - Knight of the Distinguished Order of the Golden Fleece (13 April 2007)
  - Knight of the Collar of the Royal and Distinguished Spanish Order of Charles III (11 May 2001)
  - Knight Grand Cross of the Royal and Distinguished Spanish Order of Charles III (8 July 1980)
- Sweden: Knight with Collar of the Royal Order of the Seraphim (12 September 1983)
- Turkey: Member of the Order of the State of Republic of Turkey (19 November 2013)
- United Kingdom:
  - Honorary Knight Grand Cross of the Royal Victorian Order (8 November 1976)
  - Recipient of the Sandhurst Medal (22 September 2020)

Henri, Grand Duke of Luxembourg House of Luxembourg-Nassau Cadet branch of the House of Nassau Born: 16 April 1955
Regnal titles
Preceded by Jean	Grand Duke of Luxembourg; 2000–2025	Succeeded by Guillaume V
Titles in pretence
Preceded by Jean	— TITULAR — Duke of Nassau; 2000–2025; Reason for succession failure: Prussian annexation of Nassau in 1866	Succeeded by Guillaume V, Grand Duke of Luxembourg
Preceded by Prince Sixtus Henry of Bourbon-Parma, Duke of Aranjuez	Line of succession to the French throne (Legitimist); 33nd position	Succeeded by Guillaume V, Grand Duke of Luxembourg
