= Princess Margaretha of Liechtenstein =

European royal (born 1957)

Princess Margaretha
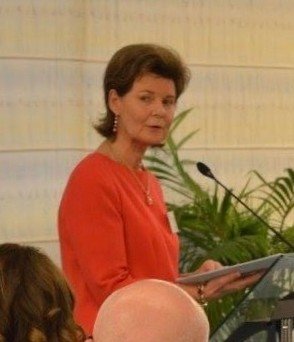
- Princess Margaretha in 2016
- Born: Princess Margaretha of Luxembourg; 15 May 1957 (age 69); Betzdorf Castle, Betzdorf, Luxembourg
- Spouse: Prince Nikolaus of Liechtenstein (m. 1982)
- Issue: Prince Leopold; Princess Maria-Anunciata; Princess Marie-Astrid; Prince Josef-Emanuel
Names
- Margaretha Antonia Marie Félicité
- House: Nassau-Weilburg (official); Bourbon-Parma (agnatic); Liechtenstein (by marriage)
- Father: Jean, Grand Duke of Luxembourg
- Mother: Princess Joséphine-Charlotte of Belgium

Princess Margaretha of Liechtenstein (born Princess Margaretha of Luxembourg; 15 May 1957) is the fourth child and second and youngest daughter of Grand Duke Jean of Luxembourg and Princess Joséphine-Charlotte of Belgium. As the sister of Grand Duke Henri of Luxembourg and the sister-in-law of Prince Hans-Adam II of Liechtenstein, she is a princess of two current realms and a member of the Luxembourg and Liechtenstein reigning dynasties.

== Biography ==
Princess Margaretha is the twin sister of Prince Jean of Luxembourg. She was educated in Luxembourg, where she studied at the European School, as well as in Belgium, the United Kingdom and the United States. She speaks Luxembourgish, French, English and German, having spent time in numerous countries as either student or tourist. She has acquired a doctorate in the social sciences.

Princess Margaretha is the patron of Dyslexia International. She is also the Patroness of the Princess Margaretha Luxembourgish Girl Guides of Leudelange and of the Crèche de Luxembourg. She travels frequently between her home in Liechtenstein, her native Luxembourg, Brussels, where she attends conferences and meetings related to the EU-NGO in which she remains actively involved. Other travel includes visits abroad with her husband, such as their 2011 visit to the University of Dallas, where the couple was hosted and interviewed on campus.

Her main recreational interests and sport activities include riding, skiing, tennis, hunting, reading and modern and classical music. Her reading emphasizes historical biographies and spiritual works.

In 2011 Grand Duke Henri decreed that his female descendants would henceforth enjoy the right of succession to the throne without regard to gender, in accordance with absolute primogeniture. Other princesses of the dynasty, descended from prior sovereigns, may still inherit the throne in the event of extinction of all male dynasts and of all dynasts descended from Grand Duke Henri, and in the order stipulated by the 1907 amendment to the 1783 Nassau Family Pact.

Margaretha bears the marital titles Princess of Liechtenstein and Countess of Rietberg, as well as those due to her own royal descent, Princess of Luxembourg, Princess of Bourbon-Parma and Princess of Nassau. As the issue of a dynastically approved marriage, her children are members of the princely House of Liechtenstein. Her son is in the line of succession to the throne of Liechtenstein, being a fraternal nephew of Prince Hans-Adam II.

=== Marriage and children ===
On 20 March 1982, she married Prince Nikolaus of Liechtenstein at Notre Dame Cathedral in Luxembourg City. He is the third son of Franz Joseph II, Prince of Liechtenstein and Countess Georgina von Wilczek. For the time being, this is the last dynastically equal marriage between two sovereign houses currently reigning in Europe. On her marriage in 1982 she became HRH Princess Margaretha of Liechtenstein, Countess of Rietberg, the Principality of Liechtenstein recognising and retaining her use of the style Royal Highness.

They have four children and five grandchildren:

- Prince Leopold Emmanuel Jean Marie of Liechtenstein (b. Brussels, 20 May 1984 – d. Brussels, 20 May 1984). Buried at Royal Crypt (Belgium).
- Princess Maria-Anunciata Astrid Joséphine Veronica of Liechtenstein (b. Brussels-Uccle, 12 May 1985). Married to Carlo Emanuele Musini (b. 1979, Camden, London, UK) in a civil ceremony on 26 June 2021 in Gubbio, Italy. The religious ceremony took place on 4 September 2021 at the Scots Basilica in Vienna, Austria. The couple has two children:
  - Georgina Musini (b. 2023)
  - Constantino Musini (b. 2026)
- Princess Marie-Astrid Nora Margarita Veronica of Liechtenstein (b. Brussels-Uccle, 26 June 1987). On 25 September 2021 married to Raphael Worthington V (b. 5 April 1985, U.S.) at Cathedral of Santa Maria Assunta in Orbetello, Italy. The couple has two daughters:
  - Althaea Georgina Worthington (b. 1 July 2022)
  - Aloisia Worthington (b. 2023)
- Prince Josef-Emanuel Leopold Marie of Liechtenstein (b. Brussels-Uccle, 7 May 1989). Married to Colombian María Claudia "Cloclo" Echavarría Suárez (b. 9 July 1988, Colombia), daughter of late Colombian businessman Felipe Francisco Echavarría Rocha and wife Evelia "Chiqui", a prominent figure in the artistic and social life of Cartagena, on 25 March 2022 at St. Peter Claver Church in Cartagena de Indias, Colombia. The couple has two sons:
  - Prince Leopold of Liechtenstein (b. March 2023)
  - Prince Nikolai of Liechtenstein (b. 21 June 2025)

Princess Margaretha is the godmother of her nephews, Archduke Imre of Austria and Prince Louis of Luxembourg, and of her cousin's daughter, Princess Louise of Belgium.

== Honours ==
=== National ===
- Luxembourg:
  - Knight Grand Cross of the Order of Adolphe of Nassau
  - Recipient of the Grand Duke Jean Silver Jubilee Medal
- Liechtenstein:
  - Dame Grand Cross of the Order of Merit of the Principality of Liechtenstein

=== Foreign ===
- (Austria-Hungary) Austrian Imperial and Royal Family: Dame, 1st Class of the Order of the Starry Cross
- (Kingdom of Portugal) Portuguese Royal Family: Dame Grand Cross of the Order of Saint Isabel
- Sovereign Military Order of Malta: Knight Grand Cross of Honour and Devotion of the Sovereign Military Order of Malta, 3rd First Class
- Spain: Knight Grand Cross of the Order of Isabella the Catholic
