= Princess Joséphine-Charlotte of Belgium =

Grand Duchess of Luxembourg from 1964 to 2000

Joséphine-Charlotte
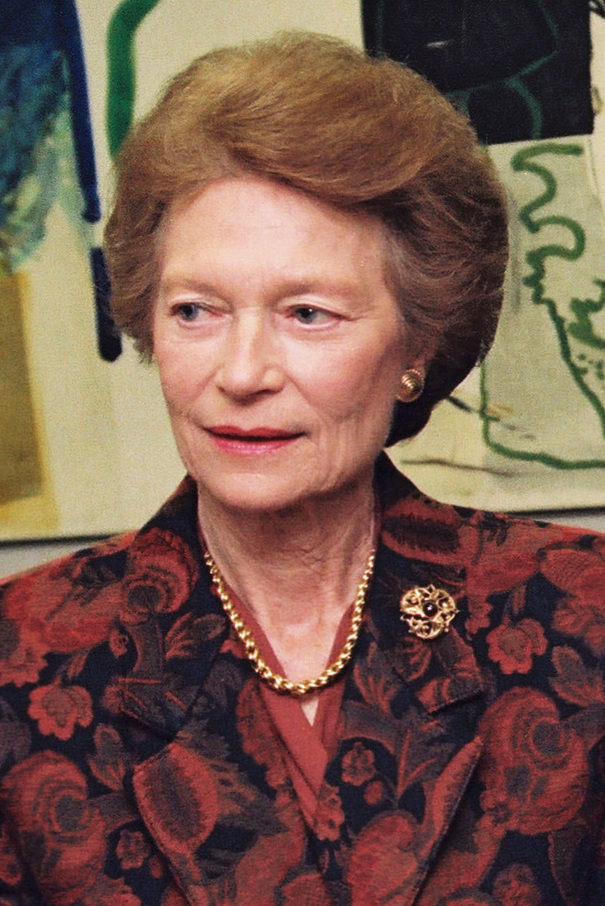
- Joséphine-Charlotte in 1991

Grand Duchess consort of Luxembourg
- Tenure: 12 November 1964 – 7 October 2000
- Born: 11 October 1927; Royal Palace of Brussels, Brussels, Belgium
- Died: 10 January 2005 (aged 77); Fischbach Castle, Fischbach, Luxembourg
- Burial: 15 January 2005; Notre-Dame Cathedral, Luxembourg
- Spouse: Jean, Grand Duke of Luxembourg (m. 1953)
- Issue: Archduchess Marie-Astrid of Austria; Henri, Grand Duke of Luxembourg; Prince Jean; Margaretha, Princess Nikolaus of Liechtenstein; Prince Guillaume
Names
- Joséphine-Charlotte Stéphanie Ingeborg Elisabeth Marie-José Marguerite Astrid
- House: Belgium
- Father: Leopold III of Belgium
- Mother: Princess Astrid of Sweden

Princess Joséphine-Charlotte of Belgium (11 October 1927 – 10 January 2005) was Grand Duchess of Luxembourg as the wife of Grand Duke Jean. She was the first child of King Leopold III of Belgium, and sister of the late King Baudouin and former King Albert II and aunt of King Philippe. She was also the maternal first cousin of the late King Harald V of Norway, maternal second cousin of former Queen Margrethe II of Denmark, and a paternal third cousin of the late Queen Elizabeth II of the United Kingdom.

== Childhood ==
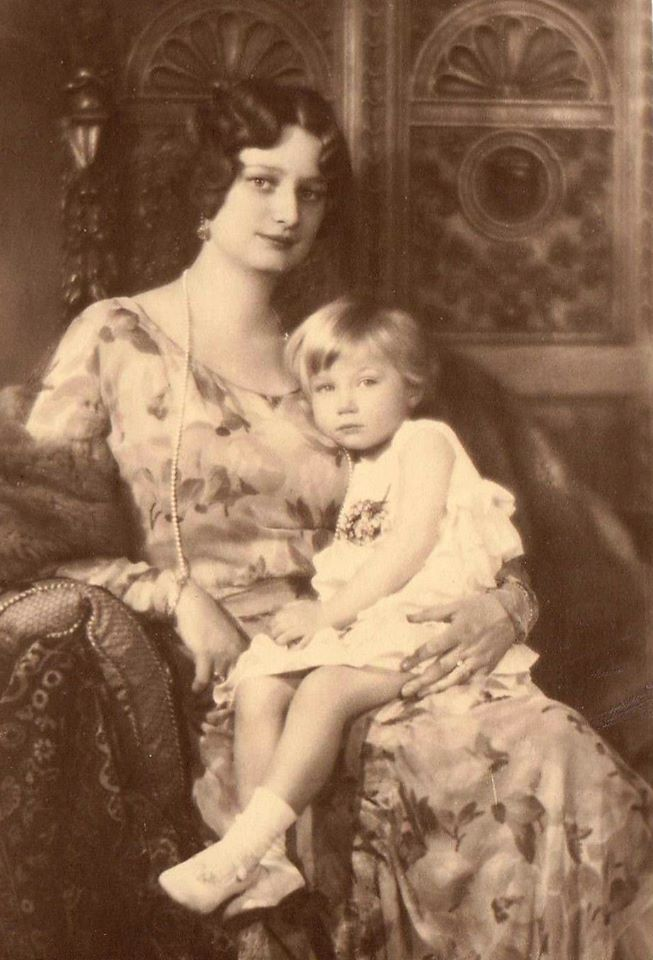
Queen Astrid of the Belgians with her daughter Joséphine-Charlotte.

Joséphine-Charlotte was born in 1927 at the Royal Palace of Brussels. She was the oldest child and only daughter of the King Leopold III of Belgium and his first wife, Princess Astrid of Sweden. She was christened a month after her birth. Her godfather was her uncle, Prince Charles, Count of Flanders and her godmother was her future mother-in-law, Grand Duchess Charlotte of Luxembourg. While expecting her daughter, Astrid had read a biography of her ancestress, the French empress Joséphine de Beauharnais. Josephine was also the name of one of the child's great-aunts, Princess Joséphine-Caroline of Belgium, the dearest sister of King Albert I. She was called "little Jo" by her mother.

Joséphine-Charlotte initially spent her childhood in the Royal Palace of Brussels before moving to Stuyvenberg Castle in 1930. She was the older sister of Belgian monarchs Baudouin and Albert II. Leopold and Astrid were devoted parents to their children. While her parents went abroad, Joséphine-Charlotte and her siblings stayed in Belgium under the care of governesses and nannies. She and her siblings lived with their maternal grandparents in their summer house in Sweden during holidays. Queen Astrid commissioned a playhouse built in the gardens of the Castle of Laeken for her children’s enjoyment. Joséphine-Charlotte often accompanied her mother on official public appearances.

Joséphine-Charlotte's mother was killed in an automobile accident in Switzerland in August 1935 when Joséphine-Charlotte was nearly eight. After her mother's death, Joséphine-Charlotte spontaneously assumed the role of mother for her two brothers. The Belgian public extended their enormous sympathies onto the grieving family, with great concern given to the effects their mother's death had on Joséphine-Charlotte and her brothers. King Leopold remained a devoted father to his children and kept close ties with his late wife's family. Many photographs exist from this time of the children with their Swedish grandparents and Norwegian cousins. Later, in 1941, her father remarried to Mary Lilian Baels (later became Princess of Réthy). This marriage produced three more children: Prince Alexandre (who was also Joséphine-Charlotte's godson), Princess Marie-Christine and Princess Marie-Esméralda. Joséphine-Charlotte initially had a hard time accepting her father's second marriage but later developed a close relationship with her stepmother and called her "Mother".

== Education ==
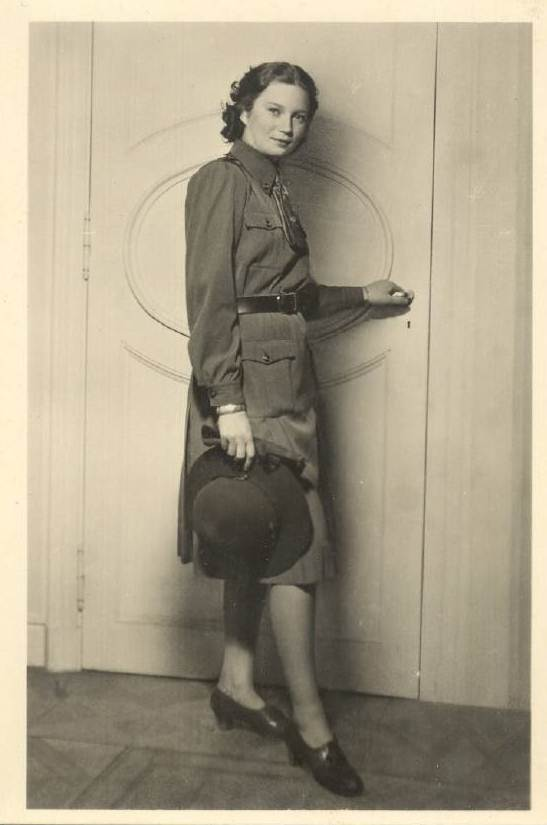
Princess Joséphine-Charlotte

Joséphine-Charlotte first attended school at the Royal Palace in Brussels, where a small class had been organized for her. In her free time, she joined the Belgian Girl Guides. She and her brothers went through a short period of exodus in France and Spain under the care of Viscount Gatien du Parc just after the German invasion of Belgium. They initially settled in Russy before moving to Château de Montal in Saint-Jean-Lespinasse. They and Viscount du Parc travelled to San Sebastián in Spain after her father offered himself as a prisoner of war to Nazi Germany.

In August 1940, Joséphine-Charlotte and her brothers returned to Belgium. Joséphine-Charlotte attended the Boarding School of the Faithful Virgin in Brussels from the end of 1940 until 1942. She then continued her education with her own private teachers at the Royal Palace of Laeken, where her family was held prisoner. On 7 June 1944, the day after the Allied Forces landed in Normandy, France, she and her father were sent to Hirschstein Castle near Dresden, Germany and kept there under house arrest. On Adolf Hitler's orders, King Leopold III and his family were deported to Strobl, Austria where they were given shelter in a villa. The Royal Family, which included her brothers Baudouin and Albert, her half-brother Alexandre, and their stepmother Princess Lilian, was freed on 7 May 1945 and settled in Château du Reposoir, in Pregny-Chambésy, Switzerland until 1950.

Joséphine-Charlotte continued her studies at the École Supérieure de Jeunes Filles in Geneva, Switzerland. There, she took courses in French literature, English, history and chemistry. Afterwards, Joséphine-Charlotte enrolled at the University of Geneva where she received lessons from Jean Piaget.

== Adulthood ==
On 11 April 1949, Joséphine-Charlotte returned to Belgium for the first time since the war from Luxembourg. She was the first member of the royal family to set foot on Belgian soil again since World War II. She visited Belgium as a test to see how the population reacted to the royal family and to polish the monarchy's reputation. A few months earlier, she had expressed her desire to return to Belgium during the presentation of a gift from the Belgian delegation of the Ladies of the Resistance. In Bastogne, she visited Bastogne's Town Hall, the war memorial and Mardasson Memorial. She also visited Bande, Marche and Namur before reaching Brussels, where she stayed at the Royal Palace of Laeken with her grandmother, Queen Elisabeth.

On 13 April 1949, Joséphine-Charlotte visited Lichtervelde and La Panne before returning to Brussels to participate in the Holy Thursday mass in Mechelen. On 16 April 1949, she left Brussels and stayed at Fischbach Castle in Luxembourg for a few days before returning to Switzerland. She returned to Belgium again to vote in the referendum on 12 March 1950, which ended up with the result of the maintenance of the monarchy in Belgium. After the accession of her brother Baudouin, Joséphine-Charlotte resided in Laeken with her father, stepmother and her brothers. She also took up her official duties and made several official trips outside Belgium. At the same time, she also devoted herself to social problems and developed her interest in the arts. In February 1953, Joséphine-Charlotte visited several villages in Belgium that were affected by the floods. She also distributed aids and gifts. A few days before her wedding, Joséphine-Charlotte announced in a radio message that she would donate all the donations she had received to a national Belgian fund to combat polio.

== Marriage ==
Joséphine-Charlotte met Jean, Grand Duke of Luxembourg during one of her short stays with her godmother and future mother-in-law, Grand Duchess Charlotte, in Fischbach in 1948. Rumours of the engagement of Joséphine-Charlotte and Jean had already been circulating after Jean visited her in Pregny-Chambésy in 1948. On 7 November 1952, the couple announced their engagement to the public. Joséphine-Charlotte and Jean were joined in marriage on 9 April 1953 in Luxembourg. During their 52-year marriage, the couple had five children:

- Princess Marie-Astrid of Luxembourg (b. 17 February 1954)
- Henri, Grand Duke of Luxembourg (b. 16 April 1955)
- Prince Jean of Luxembourg (b. 15 May 1957)
- Princess Margaretha of Luxembourg (b. 15 May 1957)
- Prince Guillaume of Luxembourg (b. 1 May 1963)

== Grand Duchess ==
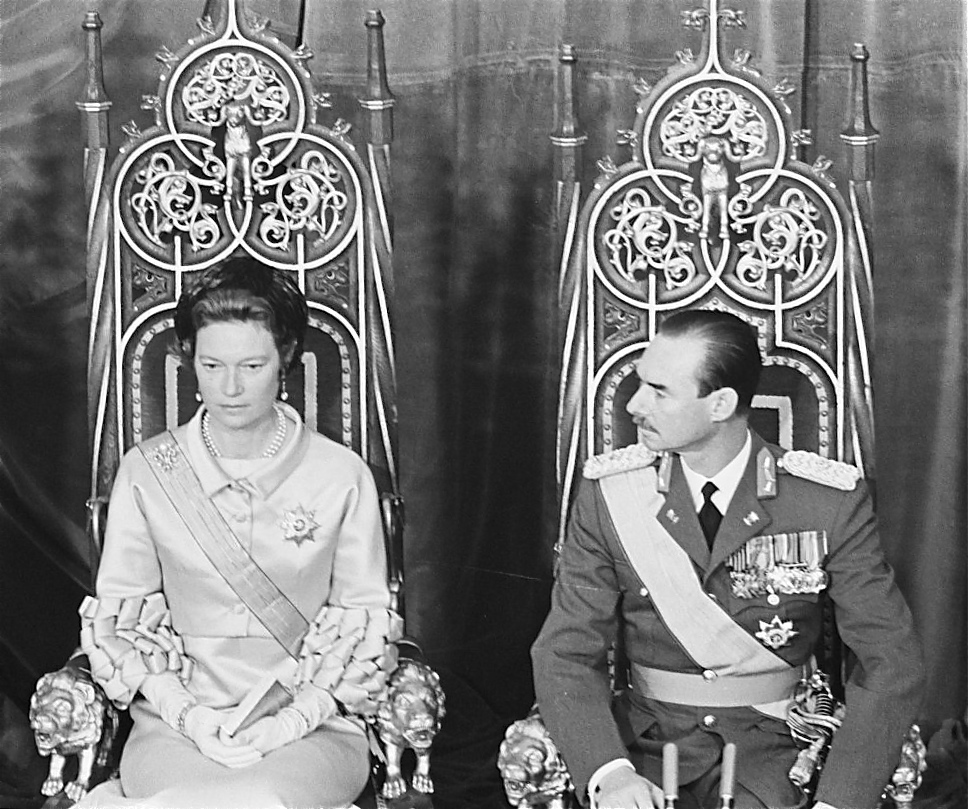
Joséphine-Charlotte and Jean at the accession of Grand Duke Jean in 1964.

As a Belgian princess, Joséphine-Charlotte brought a wealth of elegance, taste and refinement to her new homeland. She carried out many social, cultural and humanitarian duties. She focused on several initiatives that she would ardently support, particularly matters pertaining to children and families. Unlike her predecessors, Joséphine-Charlotte played her role as Grand Duchess perfectly, albeit always reservedly, which resulted in Joséphine-Charlotte's low popularity among the Luxembourgers. She also never fully mastered the Luxembourgish language. After the accession of Grand Duke Jean in 1964, the Grand Ducal family, who initially lived at Betzdorf Castle, moved to Berg Castle. Grand Duchess Joséphine-Charlotte was actively involved in the renovation of the castle.

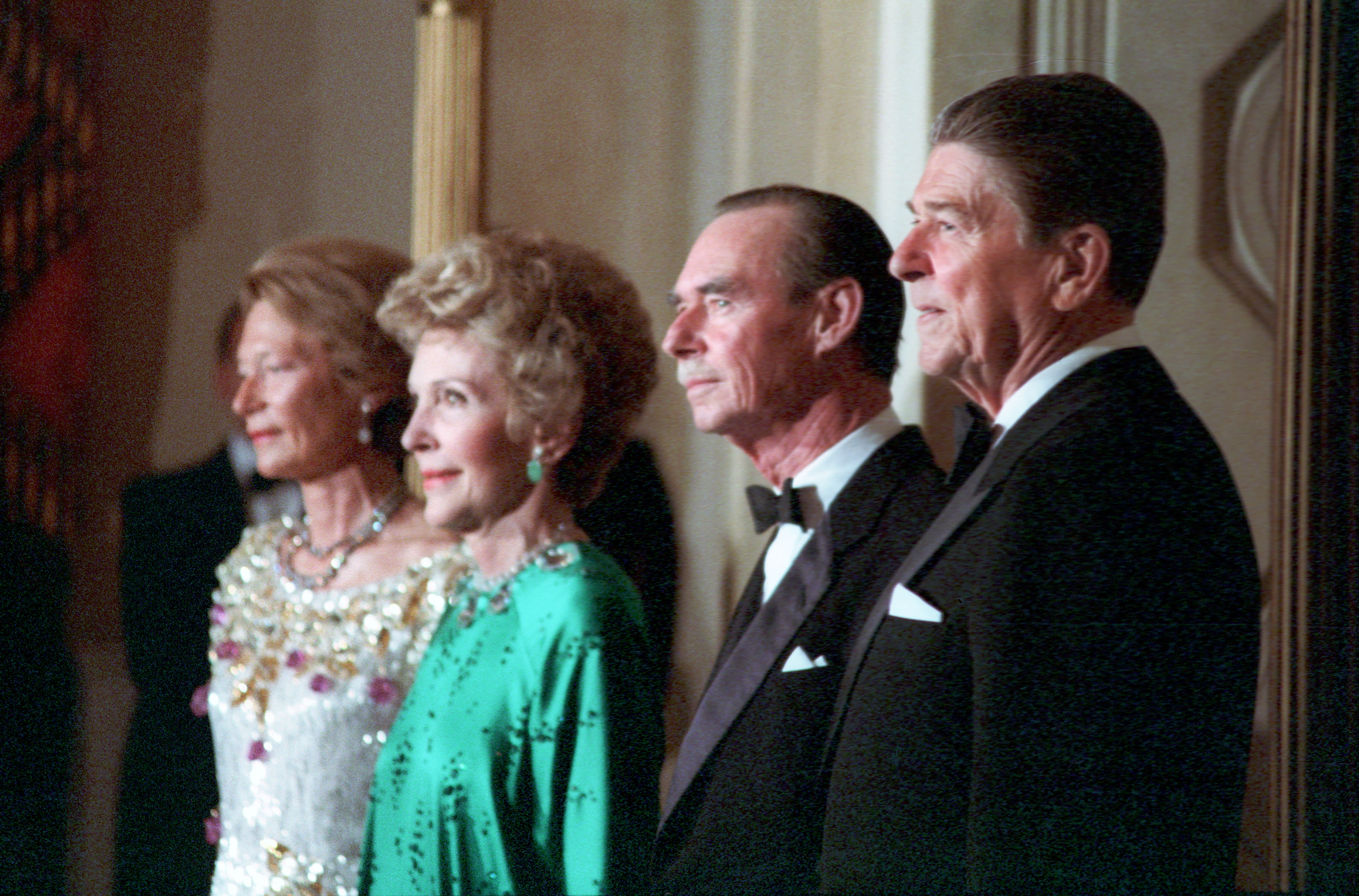
Grand Duke Jean and Grand Duchess Josephine-Charlotte with President Ronald Reagan and Nancy Reagan at the White House in 1984.

As Grand Duchess, she often accompanied her husband on foreign visits, as well as many events within Luxembourg itself. She and the Grand Duke made numerous state visits such as to the Vatican and Brazil in 1965, the United Kingdom in 1972, USSR and Tunisia in 1975, Senegal in 1977, China in 1979, and the United States in 1984. During her tenure as a consort, she and her husband hosted 39 state visits to Luxembourg.

Joséphine-Charlotte became president of the Luxembourg Red Cross in 1964. She was president of Luxembourg Youth Section of the Red Cross. She also served as honorary president of the Luxembourg Philharmonic Orchestra. She became the chief guide of Luxembourg’s guides movement in 1990. She was the patron of the Union of Voluntary Blood Donors and the Luxembourg Paediatrics Society. The Grand Duchess also oversaw the restoration of the Grand Ducal Palace from 1991 until 1996. She became a patron and honorary president of l’association pour la protection curative de l’enfance, the Scouts and Guides of Luxembourg, the Equestrian Federation, les Jeunesses musicales, the International Bazaar of Luxembourg and the Hëllef fir kriibskrank Kanner Foundation. She also regularly visited Luxembourg's social and cultural centers, establishments, institutes, hospitals and nurseries.

Beside secular organizations, Joséphine-Charlotte supported religious institutions such as Action Catholique des Femmes du Luxembourg (ACFL) of which she became a patron.

== Hobbies ==
Grand Duchess Joséphine-Charlotte's favorite hobbies included gardening and horticulture. She also enjoyed hunting, fishing, skiing and other watersports. The Grand Duchess also enjoyed collecting works of modern art. In 2003, the exhibition named De Manessier à Wim Delvoye presented 108 works from the private collection of the Grand Duchess at the National Museum of History and Art in Luxembourg.

== Death ==
The Grand Duchess, who suffered from lung cancer for a long time, died at her home, Fischbach Castle in 2005, at the age of 77.

== Legacy ==
Joséphine-Charlotte metro station in Brussels is named after her. One of her wedding gifts was a diamond tiara, commonly known as the Belgian Scroll Tiara, given by the Société Générale. This is now part of the Luxembourg reigning family's jewel collection.

On 5 December 2016, a remembrance concert in honour of Grand Duchess Joséphine-Charlotte was held in Luxembourg. The concert was performed by Vienna Philharmonic Orchestra and directed by Tugan Sokhiev while Rudolf Buchbinder performed on the piano.

== Honours ==
=== National ===
- Belgium:
  - Grand Cordon of the Order of Leopold
- Luxembourg:
  - Knight of the Order of the Gold Lion of the House of Nassau
  - Grand Cross of the Order of Adolphe of Nassau

=== Foreign ===
- Denmark: Knight of the Order of the Elephant
- Germany: Grand Cross Special Class of the Order of Merit of the Federal Republic of Germany
- (Kingdom of Greece) Greek Royal Family: Dame 1st Class of the Royal Order of Saints Olga and Sophia
- Iceland: Grand Cross of the Order of the Falcon
- (Iran) Iranian Imperial Family: Recipient of the Commemorative Medal of the 2,500 year Celebration of the Persian Empire
- Holy See: Recipient of the Pro Ecclesia et Pontifice
- Sovereign Military Order of Malta: Bailiff Dame Grand Cross in Obedience of the Sovereign Military Order of Malta
- Japan: Grand Cordon (Paulownia) of the Order of the Precious Crown
- Netherlands:
  - Knight Grand Cross of the Order of the Netherlands Lion
  - Recipient of the Wedding Medal of Beatrix, Princess of Orange and Claus van Amsberg
- Norway: Grand Cross of the Order of St. Olav
- Portugal: Grand Cross of the Order of Christ
- Spain: Dame Grand Cross of the Order of Isabella the Catholic
- Sweden:
  - Member of the Royal Order of the Seraphim (12 September 1983)
  - Recipient of the 50th Birthday Badge Medal of King Carl XVI Gustaf (30 April 1996)
- Thailand: Dame Grand Cross of the Order of Chula Chom Klao
- United Kingdom: Recipient of the Queen Elizabeth II Coronation Medal

Princess Joséphine-Charlotte of Belgium House of Saxe-Coburg and Gotha Cadet branch of the House of Wettin Born: 11 October 1927 Died: 10 January 2005
Luxembourgish royalty
| Preceded by Prince Felix of Bourbon-Parma as prince consort | Grand Duchess consort of Luxembourg; Duchess consort of Nassau; 1964–2000 | Succeeded by María Teresa Mestre y Batista |
