= Jean, Grand Duke of Luxembourg =

Grand Duke of Luxembourg from 1964 to 2000

Jean
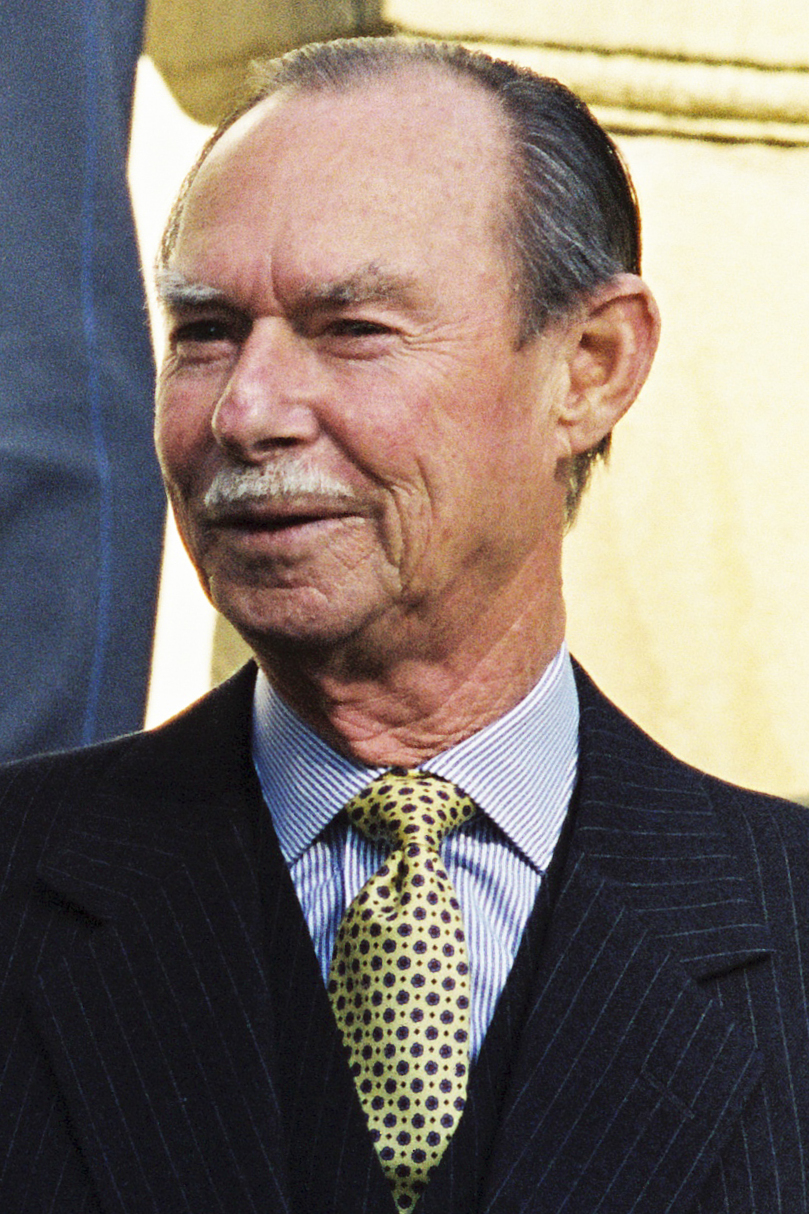
- Jean in 1994

Grand Duke of Luxembourg
- Reign: 12 November 1964 – 7 October 2000
- Enthronement: 12 November 1964
- Predecessor: Charlotte
- Successor: Henri
- Regent: Henri (1998–2000)

Regent of Luxembourg
- Regency: 4 May 1961 – 12 November 1964
- Monarch: Charlotte
- Born: 5 January 1921; Berg Castle, Colmar-Berg, Luxembourg
- Died: 23 April 2019 (aged 98); Luxembourg City, Luxembourg
- Burial: 4 May 2019; Notre-Dame Cathedral, Luxembourg City, Luxembourg
- Spouse: Princess Joséphine-Charlotte of Belgium (m. 1953; died 2005)
- Issue: Archduchess Marie-Astrid of Austria; Henri, Grand Duke of Luxembourg; Prince Jean; Princess Margaretha; Prince Guillaume
Names
- Jean Benoît Guillaume Robert Antoine Louis Marie Adolphe Marc d'Aviano
- House: Luxembourg-Nassau (official); Bourbon-Parma (agnatic)
- Father: Prince Felix of Bourbon-Parma
- Mother: Charlotte, Grand Duchess of Luxembourg

Jean (Jean Benoît Guillaume Robert Antoine Louis Marie Adolphe Marc d'Aviano; 5 January 1921 – 23 April 2019) was Grand Duke of Luxembourg from 1964 until his abdication in 2000. He was the first Grand Duke of Luxembourg of French agnatic descent.

Jean was the eldest son of Grand Duchess Charlotte and Prince Felix. Jean's primary education was initially in Luxembourg, before attending Ampleforth College in England. In 1938, he was officially named Hereditary Grand Duke as heir apparent to the throne of Luxembourg. While Luxembourg was occupied by Germans during the Second World War, the grand ducal family was abroad in exile. Jean studied at the Université Laval in Quebec City. Jean later volunteered to join the British army's Irish Guards in 1942, and after graduating from the Royal Military Academy Sandhurst, received his commission in 1943. He participated in the Normandy landings and the Battle for Caen, and joined the Allied forces in the liberation of Luxembourg. From 1984 until 2000, he was Colonel of the Regiment of the Irish Guards.

On 9 April 1953, Jean married Princess Joséphine-Charlotte of Belgium, with whom he had five children. On 12 November 1964, Grand Duchess Charlotte abdicated and Jean succeeded her as Grand Duke of Luxembourg. He then reigned for 36 years before he himself abdicated on 7 October 2000 and was succeeded by his son Grand Duke Henri.

== Early life ==
=== Birth and family ===
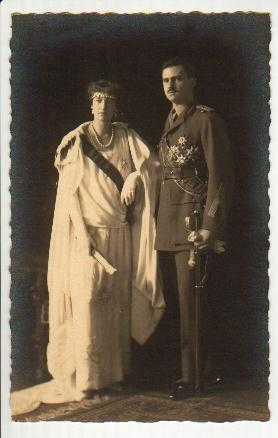
Jean's parents, Charlotte and Felix, in 1919.

Jean was born on 5 January 1921 at Berg Castle in central Luxembourg, the first child of Grand Duchess Charlotte and of Prince Félix. He was born just two years after his mother's accession as Grand Duchess, which took place after her elder sister Grand Duchess Marie-Adélaïde had been forced to abdicate in 1919 when she was accused of being pro-German during the First World War. As the eldest child of the reigning Grand Duchess, he was heir apparent from birth. Among his godparents was Pope Benedict XV, who gave him his second name.

=== Childhood and education ===
Prince Jean was raised with his five siblings, and grew up primarily at his parents' residence, Berg Castle, in the town of Colmar-Berg. The young prince attended primary school in Luxembourg, where he continued the initial stage of secondary education. From 1934 to 1938, he completed secondary school at Ampleforth College, a Roman Catholic boarding school in the United Kingdom. Upon reaching maturity, on 5 January 1939 he was styled 'Hereditary Grand Duke', recognising his status as heir apparent.

== Hereditary Grand Duke ==
=== Second World War ===
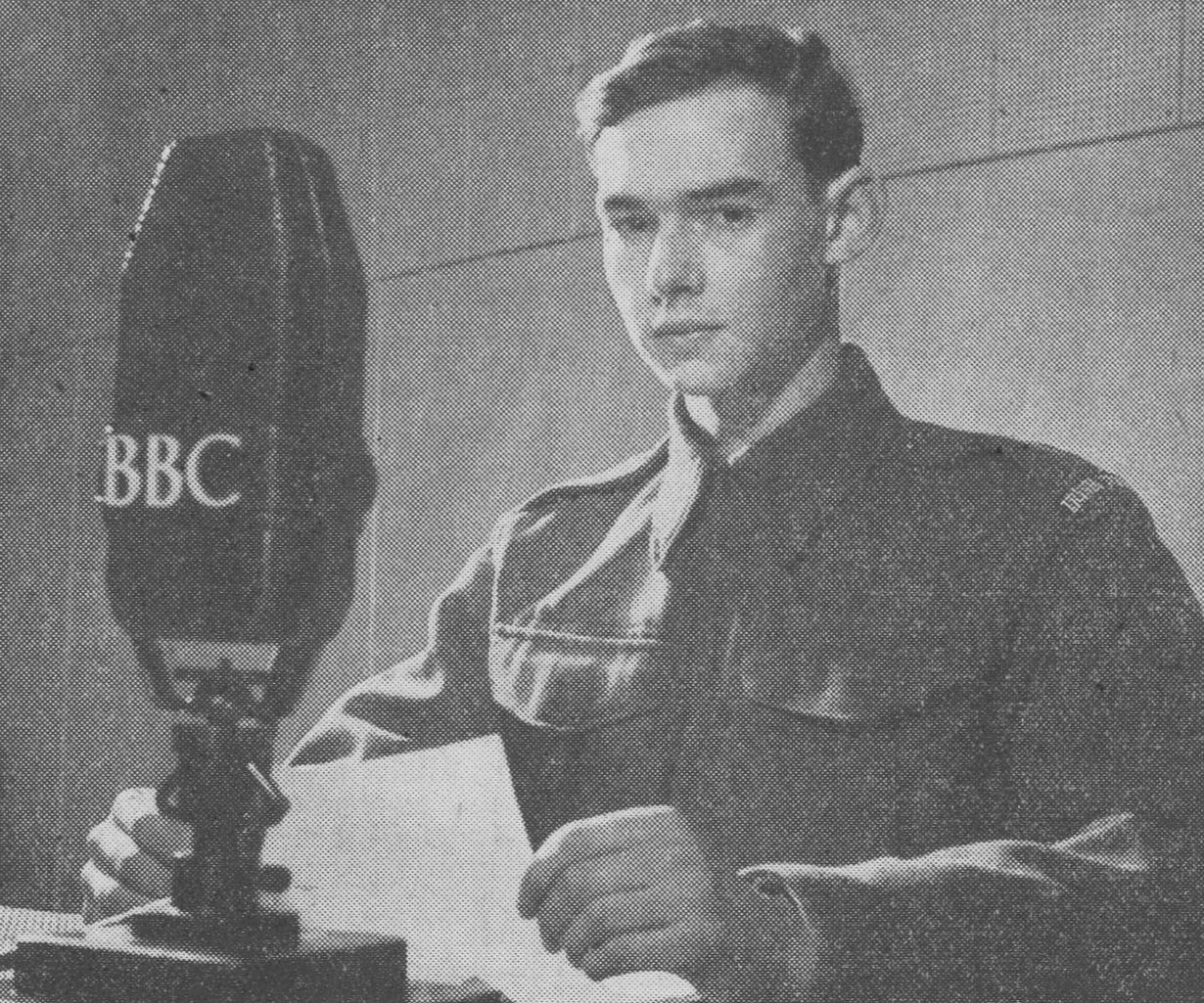
Prince Jean speaking on the BBC in 1943

Just a few months later, World War II broke out. Although the country declared itself neutral and unarmed, the Luxembourgers knew from their World War I experience that their country's neutrality would not necessarily protect them. On 10 May 1940, Germany invaded Luxembourg, beginning a four-year occupation. Having been warned of an imminent invasion, the Grand Ducal Family escaped the previous night, together with the government of Luxembourg.

At first, they sought refuge in Paris, before fleeing France only weeks later, after receiving transit visas to Portugal from the Portuguese consul Aristides de Sousa Mendes, in June 1940. They arrived at Vilar Formoso on 23 June 1940. After travelling through Coimbra and Lisbon, the family first stayed in Cascais, in Casa de Santa Maria, owned by Manuel Espírito Santo, who was then the honorary consul for Luxembourg in Portugal. By July they had moved to Monte Estoril, staying at the Chalet Posser de Andrade. On 10 July 1940, Prince Jean, together with his father Prince Félix, his siblings, Princess Elisabeth, Princess Marie Adelaide, Princess Marie Gabriele, Prince Charles and Princess Alix, the nanny Justine Reinard and the chauffeur Eugène Niclou, along with his wife Joséphine, boarded the S.S. Trenton headed for New York City, where they sought refuge in the United States, renting an estate in Brookville, New York. The grand duchess travelled from Portugal to London, where a government in exile was set up, before joining her family in North America. Jean studied Law and Political Science at Université Laval, Quebec City.

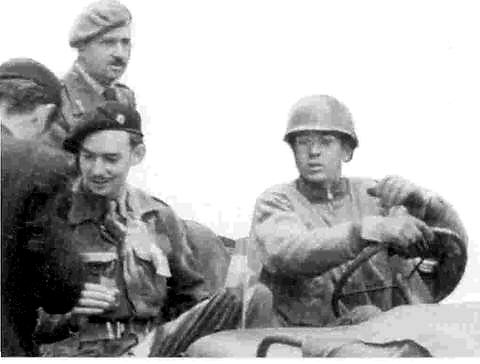
Prince Jean, together with his father Prince Félix at the liberation of Luxembourg City in 1944.

He joined the British Army as a volunteer in the Irish Guards in November 1942. After receiving officer training at the Royal Military College at Sandhurst, Jean was commissioned as a lieutenant on 30 July 1943, before being promoted to captain in 1944. He landed in Normandy on 11 June 1944, and took part in the Battle for Caen and the liberation of Brussels. On 10 September 1944, he took part in the liberation of Luxembourg before moving on to Arnhem and the invasion of Germany. He relinquished his commission in the British Army on 26 June 1947. From 1984 until his abdication, he served as Colonel of the Regiment of the Irish Guards, often riding in uniform behind Queen Elizabeth II during the Trooping the Colour.

=== Marriage ===
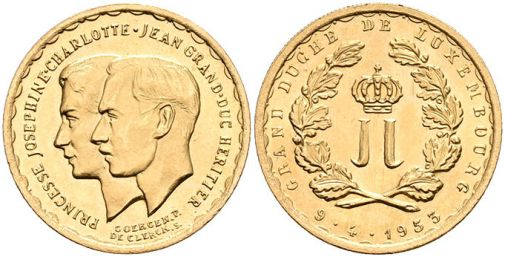
Medal struck at the occasion of the wedding of Hereditary Grand Duke Jean and Princess Joséphine-Charlotte of Belgium in 1953.

In October 1952, Jean was officially engaged to Princess Joséphine-Charlotte of Belgium, his third cousin, the only daughter of King Leopold III of the Belgians and his first wife, Princess Astrid of Sweden. There had been speculation that the marriage was arranged to improve relations between Luxembourg and Belgium but it soon became apparent that a love match was blooming between two longtime friends.

They were married in Luxembourg on 9 April 1953, first in the Hall of Ceremonies at the Grand Ducal Palace, later in Luxembourg's Notre-Dame Cathedral. The marriage put an end to the tensions between Luxembourg and Belgium which arose from 1918 to 1920 when there had been a threat of annexation.

The newlyweds were given Betzdorf Castle in Betzdorf in the eastern part of the grand duchy as their residence. The couple had five children, 22 grandchildren and 28 great-grandchildren.

Together with his wife, his parents and his sister Elisabeth, Jean took part in the ship tour organized by Queen Frederica and her husband King Paul of Greece in 1954, which became known as the "Cruise of the Kings" and was attended by over 100 royals from all over Europe.

== Reign ==
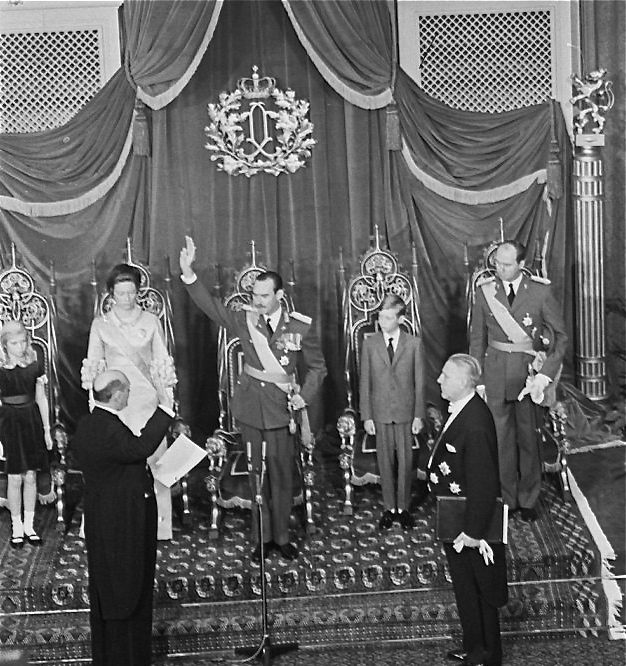
Grand Duke Jean taking his constitutional oath before the Chamber of Deputies on 12 November 1964.

Jean was named lieutenant-representative of the Grand Duchess on 28 April 1961. He became Grand Duke when his mother, Grand Duchess Charlotte, abdicated on 12 November 1964. The same day, he was made a General of the Armed Forces of Luxembourg.

From the beginning of his reign, Grand Duke Jean's priorities included the well-being of his people and the completion of European unity. In the words of President Georges Pompidou of France, "If Europe had to choose a hereditary president, it would certainly be the Grand Duke of Luxembourg". Indeed, during his reign Grand Duke Jean saw Luxembourg transformed from a minor industrial contributor into an international financial centre. In 1986, he was honoured with the Charlemagne Prize in Aachen for his efforts towards European integration.

The Grand Duke's reign was one of the most prosperous periods in the history of the Grand Duchy of Luxembourg. The degree of stability in the country's politics, economy and social life was without precedent, thanks in part to the influence of the Grand Duke and his wife. He abdicated on 7 October 2000, and was succeeded on the throne by his son Henri.

Luxembourg's museum of modern art Mudam was officially named "Musée d'Art Moderne Grand-Duc Jean" to commemorate his reign which lasted 36 years. It was inaugurated in his presence in July 2006.

== Later life ==
=== Retirement ===
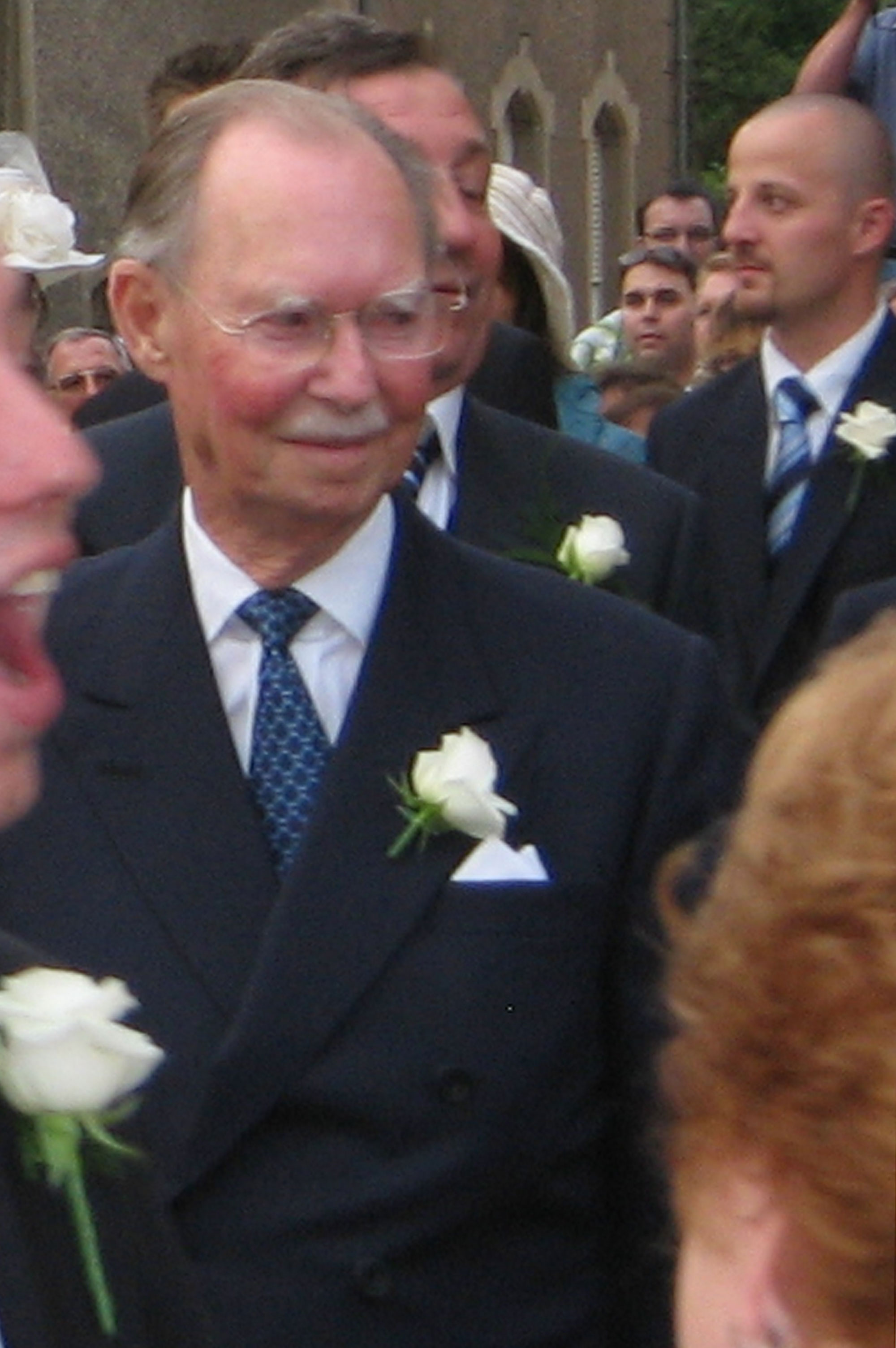
Jean at the wedding of his grandson Prince Louis in 2006

In the summer of 2002, Grand Duke Jean and Grand Duchess Joséphine Charlotte took up residence at Fischbach Castle. After his wife died in January 2005, the Grand Duke continued to live there alone. On 27 December 2016, Grand Duke Jean was hospitalized due to bronchitis and was discharged from hospital on 4 January 2017, a day before he celebrated his 96th birthday.

=== Death ===
Surrounded by his family, Grand Duke Jean died at 00.25 CEST on 23 April 2019 at the age of 98 after he had been hospitalized for a pulmonary infection. At the time of his death, he was the longest lived undisputed monarch in history.

His funeral was held on Saturday, 4 May at the Notre-Dame Cathedral, Luxembourg after a period of mourning of 12 days.

=== Tributes ===
Jean-Claude Juncker, president of the European Commission and former Prime Minister of Luxembourg, described Jean's death as "a great loss for the Grand Duchy and for Europe". He added, "Like all the people of Luxembourg, I had great esteem for this man of commitment, kindness and courage."

Luxembourg's Prime Minister, Xavier Bettel, alluded to his service in the Second World War: "Grand Duke Jean fought for our freedom, for our independence and for the unity of our country and we will always be grateful. A family man left us today. A great statesman, a hero, an example – and a very beloved and gracious man."

Tributes followed from the Belgian royal family, commenting "His courage, his dignity and his high sense of duty will remain as an example... The whole of Belgium shares the grief of the Luxembourg people."

In their tribute, the Dutch royal family mentioned "the friendship and warmth he radiated", adding "With his thoughtfulness and humanity, he added to calm and confidence in his country and Europe."

In their tribute, the British royal family said that the Grand Duke will be "missed, both inside and outside Luxembourg".

In the tribute from the Romanian Royal Family via a post on their websites, they mentioned that "The entire Royal Family of Romania is alongside the Grand Duchy of Luxembourg in these sad and painful moments"; also written was their very close relations (via Queen Anne who was a paternal first cousin of his) as well as "a lifetime of friendship"; the head of the family, Crown Princess Margareta, sent a letter of condolences to her cousin, Grand Duke Henri.

The president of the International Olympic Committee Thomas Bach paid tribute to Grand Duke Jean who had joined the IOC in 1946 and had been an honorary member since 1998. "He was always a very calm and well-balanced person who was highly respected by the entire Olympic Movement because of his integrity... The IOC will always hold him in the highest honour and with the greatest respect."

A month after Grand Duke Jean's death, the Luxembourgish government announced plans to erect a monument in his honour in the Pescatore section of Luxembourg City's Édouard André Municipal Park, similar to the statue of Grand Duchess Charlotte on Place Clairefontaine. A contest for the selection of a design started in June 2025 after being delayed for several years, and German artist Jonas Ademes was announced as its winner in July 2026. The statue is due to be inaugurated in mid-2027 between Fondation Pescatore and the Pfaffenthal Panoramic Elevator, in a direct line of sight to the Grand Duke Jean Museum of Modern Art.

== Issue ==
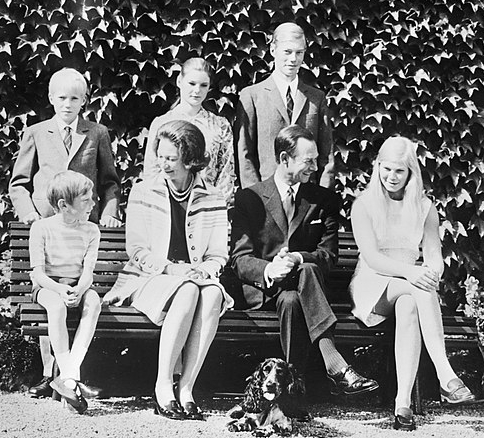
The Grand Ducal couple with their children (July 1971).

- Archduchess Marie-Astrid of Austria (born 17 February 1954) she married Archduke Carl Christian of Austria on 6 February 1982. They have five children and 16 grandchildren.
- Henri, Grand Duke of Luxembourg (born 16 April 1955), he married María Teresa Mestre y Batista on 14 February 1981. They have five children and nine grandchildren.
- Prince Jean (born 15 May 1957) he married Hélène Vestur on 27 May 1987 and they were divorced in 2004. They have four children and eight grandchildren. He remarried Diane de Guerre on 18 March 2009.
- Princess Margaretha (born 15 May 1957) she married Prince Nikolaus of Liechtenstein on 20 March 1982. They have four children and five grandchildren.
- Prince Guillaume (born 1 May 1963) he married Sibilla Weiller on 8 September 1994. They have four children.

== Titles, styles, honours and awards ==
=== Titles and styles ===
Jean renounced the titles of the House of Bourbon-Parma for himself and his family in 1986. This decree was, however, repealed by another decree on 21 September 1995. His official main titles were Grand Duke of Luxembourg, Prince of Bourbon-Parma. Since his great-grandfather Adolphe, Grand Duke of Luxembourg, had been sovereign Duke of Nassau (from 1839 to 1866) before his accession to the throne of Luxemburg in 1890, he and his descendants also bore the title Duke of Nassau with the long chain of Nassau subsidiary titles (such as Count of Sayn, Königstein, Katzenelnbogen and Diez, Burgrave of Hammerstein, Lord of Mahlberg, Wiesbaden, Idstein, Merenberg, Limburg and Eppstein).

The Arrêté Grand-Ducal (Grand Ducal decree) of 21 September 1995 established that the title of Prince/Princesse de Luxembourg is reserved for the children of the sovereign and the heir to the throne. It also stated that the descendants in male lineage of the sovereign should be styled as Royal Highnesses and titled Prince/Princess of Nassau and that the descendants of unapproved marriages should be styled as Count/Countess of Nassau.

=== Honours ===
==== National ====
- Recipient of the Military Medal (17 December 2002)
- Recipient of the Luxembourg War Cross with bronze palm
- Recipient of the Cross of the Order of Resistance

==== Foreign ====
- Austria
  - Austrian Imperial and Royal Family: 1,293rd Knight of the Imperial and Royal Order of the Golden Fleece
  - Austria: Grand Decoration of Honour in Gold with Sash of the Decoration of Honour for Services to the Republic of Austria (1975)
- Belgium:
  - Grand Cordon of the Order of Leopold I
  - Recipient of the World War II Cross of War Medal with bronze palm
- Denmark: Knight of the Order of the Elephant (22 November 1976)
- Finland: Grand Cross with Collar of the Order of the White Rose of Finland (1993)
- France:
  - Grand Cross of the Order of the Legion of Honour
  - Recipient of the World War II Cross of War Medal
- Germany: Grand Cross special class of the Order of Merit of the Federal Republic of Germany
- (Kingdom of Greece) Greek Royal Family: Knight Grand Cross of the Royal Order of the Redeemer
- Holy See: Knight of the Order of the Golden Spur
- Iceland: Collar with Grand Cross Breast Star of the Order of the Falcon
- Empire of Iran: Recipient of the Commemorative Medal of the 2,500th Year Celebration of the founding of the Persian Empire (14 October 1971)
- Italy: Knight Grand Cross with Collar of the Order of Merit of the Italian Republic (26 October 1973)
- House of Savoy:
  - Knight of the Supreme Order of the Most Holy Annunciation
  - Knight Grand Cross of the Order of Saints Maurice and Lazarus
  - Knight Grand Cross of the Order of the Crown of Italy
- Japan: Collar of the Order of the Chrysanthemum (6 February 1998)
- Sovereign Military Order of Malta: Bailiff Knight Grand Cross of Justice of the Sovereign Military Order of Malta, Special Class
- Netherlands:
  - Knight Grand Cross of the Order of the Netherlands Lion
  - Recipient of the Queen Juliana Inauguration Medal
  - Recipient of the Silver Wedding Anniversary Medal of Queen Juliana and Prince Bernhard
  - Recipient of the Wedding Medal of Princess Beatrix and Claus van Amsberg
  - Recipient of the War Commemorative Cross
- Norway: Grand Cross with Collar of the Order of Saint Olav (1964)
- Poland: Grand Cross of the Order of Merit of the Republic of Poland
- Portugal:
  - Grand Collar of the Order of the Tower and Sword
  - Grand Collar of the Order of Infante Dom Henrique (29 January 1985)
- Spain:
  - 1,184th Knight of the Royal Order of the Golden Fleece (16 June 1983)
  - Knight of the Collar of the Order of Charles III (8 July 1980)
- Sweden:
  - Knight with Collar of the Royal Order of the Seraphim (18 July 1951)
  - Recipient of the 50th Birthday Commemorative Medal of King Carl XVI Gustaf (30 April 1996)
- Thailand: Knight of the Order of the Royal House of Chakri (17 October 1960)
- United Kingdom:
  - 948th Stranger Knight Companion of the Order of the Garter (1972)
  - Recipient of the 1939–1945 Star Medal
  - Recipient of the France and Germany Star Medal
  - Recipient of the Defence Medal
  - Recipient of the World War II War Medal
  - Recipient of the Queen Elizabeth II Coronation Medal
- United States of America: Recipient of the Silver Star Medal

=== Other honours ===
==== Academic ====
- Canada
  - Québec: Honorary Degree of the University of Laval
- France:
  - Alsace: Honorary Degree of the University of Strasbourg
- United States of America
  - Ohio: Honorary Degree of the Miami University

==== Honorary military appointments ====
- United Kingdom
  - (United Kingdom) Colonel of the Irish Guards (21 August 1984 – 7 October 2000)
  - (United Kingdom) General in the British Army (17 March 1995 – 7 October 2000)

==== Organizations ====
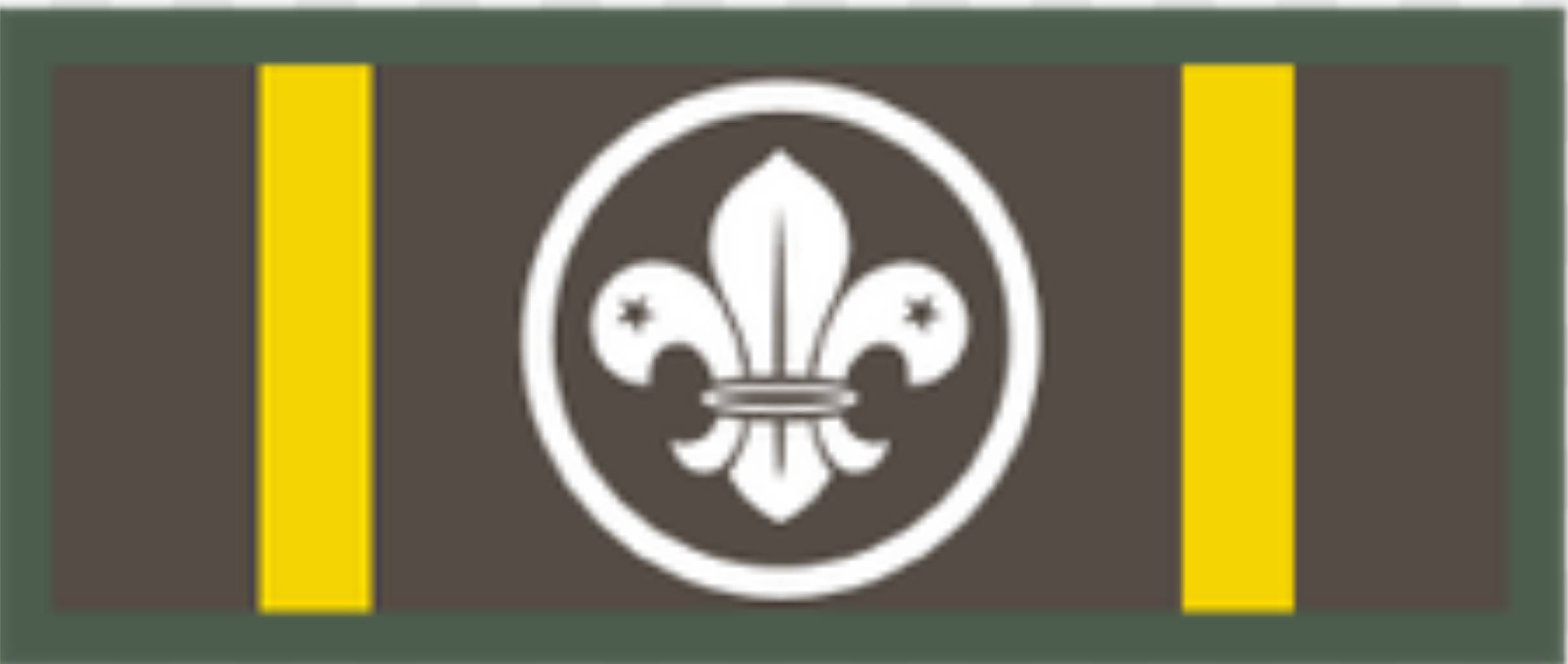
- Bronze Wolf Award for contributions to worldwide Scouting, 1995
- Gold Olympic Order, 1998

Jean, Grand Duke of Luxembourg House of Nassau-Weilburg Cadet branch of the House of Nassau Born: 5 January 1921 Died: 23 April 2019
Regnal titles
Preceded by Charlotte	Grand Duke of Luxembourg; 1964–2000	Succeeded by Henri
Titles in pretence
Preceded by Charlotte	— TITULAR — Duke of Nassau; 1964–2000; Reason for succession failure: Prussian annexation of Nassau in 1866	Succeeded by Henri
Military offices
Preceded by Basil Eugster	Colonel of the Irish Guards; 1984–2000	Succeeded by The Duke of Abercorn
