= Prince Jean of Luxembourg =

Luxembourgish prince (born 1957)

- Jean in 1971
- Born: 15 May 1957 (age 69); Betzdorf Castle, Betzdorf, Luxembourg
- Spouses: Hélène Suzanna Vestur (m. 1987; div. 2004) Diane de Guerre (m. 2009)
- Issue: Princess Marie-Gabrielle of Nassau; Prince Constantin of Nassau; Prince Wenceslas of Nassau; Prince Carl-Johan of Nassau
Names
- Jean Félix Marie Guillaume
- House: Nassau-Weilburg (official); Bourbon-Parma (agnatic)
- Father: Jean, Grand Duke of Luxembourg
- Mother: Princess Joséphine-Charlotte of Belgium

Prince Jean of Luxembourg (Jean Félix Marie Guillaume; born 15 May 1957) is the second son of Jean, Grand Duke of Luxembourg and Princess Joséphine-Charlotte of Belgium. He is the twin brother of Princess Margaretha. He frequently goes by the name of Jean Nassau.

== Early life and education ==
Prince Jean's godparents were his paternal grandfather Prince Felix, Prince Consort of Luxembourg and his 1st maternal grandaunt (sister of his maternal grandmother) Princess Margaretha of Sweden.

Prince Jean was educated in Luxembourg, Switzerland and France, where he obtained his baccalaureate. He then undertook a language course at the Bell School of Languages in Cambridge, England.

In 1977, Prince Jean began his military officer training at the Royal Military Academy Sandhurst in England. He subsequently became a member of the Champion Platoon, having been commissioned in August 1978. He was made a captain of the Luxembourg Army in 1979. After completing his university education in Geneva, he went to New York and joined W.R. Grace as a financial analyst working in the Finance, Planning & Analysis Division of the group that reported to the President & CEO of the company – at that time, Mr J. Peter Grace. Back in Europe in 1985, he obtained an MBA in 1986 from INSEAD in Fontainebleau, France.

== Career ==
Prince Jean works in the water industry as an advisor to the GDF SUEZ Group, Executive VP of the Suez Fondation and a member of the executive board of Degrémont, a subsidiary of Suez Environnement. Prince Jean has been President of the Chambre de Commerce belgo-luxembourgeoise en France. In 2006, he bought the Southern African Water subsidiary of Suez Environnement, WSSA (Water & Sanitation South Africa), and created Mea Aqua, with the objective of developing water and energy services in the Middle East and in Africa. Mea Aqua and its subsidiaries employ today over 2,500 employees.

== Marriages and children ==
On 27 May 1987, Prince Jean married morganatically in Paris, France, Hélène Suzanna Vestur (b. 31 May 1958, Saint-Germain-en-Laye, France), now a high civil servant, Conseiller d'Etat and judge, daughter of François Philippe Vestur (1927-2005), merchant, and Cécile Ernestine Buisson (1928-2017). His wife and children bore the title "Countess of Nassau" from 21 September 1995. On 27 November 2004, Grand Duke Henri issued an Arrêté Grand-Ducal upgrading the titles of Prince Jean's children to Prince/Princesse de Nassau with the qualification of Altesse Royale, without succession rights. The prince and former countess divorced on 13 December, having four children together. He remarried Diane Marie Amélie Hermenegilde de Guerre (b. 13 July 1962) on 18 March 2009.

== Honours and awards ==
Styles of Prince Jean of Luxembourg
- Reference style: His Royal Highness
- Spoken style: Your Royal Highness

=== National honours ===
- Luxembourg: Knight of the Order of the Gold Lion of the House of Nassau (Note: (by birth))
- Luxembourg: Knight Grand Cross of the Order of Adolphe of Nassau (Note: (by birth, on 18 years old))

=== Foreign honours ===
- Spain: Knight Grand Cross of the Order of Isabella the Catholic (8 July 1980)

Prince Jean of Luxembourg House of Nassau-Weilburg
Royal titles
Preceded by Prince Sébastien of Luxembourg	Line of succession to the French throne (Legitimist); 50th position	Succeeded by Prince Constantin of Nassau
