= Prince Nikolaus of Liechtenstein =

Liechtensteiner lawyer, diplomat and prince

Prince Nikolaus
- Count of Rietberg
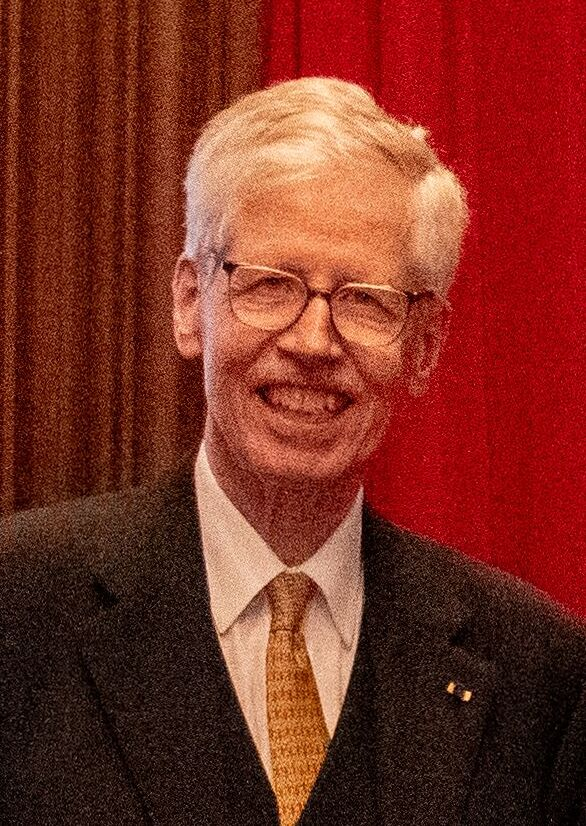
- Prince Nikolaus in 2024
- Predecessor: Prince Heinrich Hartneid of Liechtenstein
- Born: 24 October 1947 (age 79); Zürich, Switzerland
- Spouse: Princess Margaretha of Luxembourg (m. 1982)
- Issue: Prince Leopold; Princess Maria-Anunciata; Princess Marie-Astrid; Prince Josef-Emanuel
- House: Liechtenstein
- Father: Franz Joseph II, Prince of Liechtenstein
- Mother: Countess Georgina von Wilczek

Ambassador of Liechtenstein to Switzerland
- In office 1989–1996
- Preceded by: Prince Heinrich
- Succeeded by: Prince Wolfgang

Ambassador of Liechtenstein to Belgium
- In office 1996 – September 2010

Non-resident Ambassador of Liechtenstein to the Holy See
- In office 1986–2017
- Succeeded by: Prince Stefan of Liechtenstein

Prince Nikolaus of Liechtenstein (Nikolaus Ferdinand Maria Josef Raphael; born 24 October 1947) is a Liechtensteiner lawyer, diplomat and prince. He is a younger brother of the reigning prince of Liechtenstein, Hans-Adam II. He was also the non-resident Ambassador of Liechtenstein to the Holy See.

== Early life ==
Nikolaus was born in Zürich as the third son of Franz Joseph II, Prince of Liechtenstein and his wife, Countess Georgina of Wilczek.

In 1950 at the age of three Nikolaus was made a Knight of Justice in minority of the Sovereign Military Order of Malta. When the class of knights in minority was abolished in 1961, Nikolaus received his present rank in the order as a Knight of Honour and Devotion.

Nikolaus completed his primary education in Vaduz before attending the Schottengymnasium in Vienna and the Lyceum Alpinum Zuoz. From 1968 to 1972 he studied law at the University of Vienna from which he graduated with the degree Doctor iuris.

== Career ==
From 1973 to 1974, Nikolaus was Wissenschaftlicher Assistent at the International Committee of the Red Cross in Geneva. From 1975 to 1976, he worked for courts in Vaduz. From 1977 to 1978, he was an advisor to the Office of International Relations of the Liechtenstein government. Nikolaus is Delegate for International Affairs of Liechtenstein Red Cross.

From 1979 to 1989, Nikolaus was Permanent Representative of Liechtenstein to the Council of Europe in Strasbourg. From 1986 to 2017, he was non-resident Ambassador of Liechtenstein to the Holy See. From 1989 to 1996, he was Ambassador of Liechtenstein to Switzerland. From 1996 to September 2010, he was Ambassador of Liechtenstein to Belgium.

Niklaus was Chief Scout (German: Korpsführer) of Fürstlich Liechtensteinische Pfadfinderkorps St. Georg from 1971 to 1989. Today he is an honorary member of the Scout association. Nikolaus spoke at the European Forum of Guild-Scouts in Grossarl in 1990 about the topic of hunting and nature protection.

== Marriage and family ==
Nikolaus married on 20 March 1982, at Notre Dame Cathedral in Luxembourg, Princess Margaretha of Luxembourg, youngest daughter of Jean, Grand Duke of Luxembourg. For the time being, this is the last dynastically equal marriage between two sovereign houses currently reigning in Europe.

They have four children and six grandchildren:

- Prince Leopold Emmanuel Jean Marie of Liechtenstein (b. Brussels, 20 May 1984 – d. Brussels, 20 May 1984). Buried at Royal Crypt (Belgium).
- Princess Maria-Anunciata Astrid Joséphine Veronica of Liechtenstein (b. Brussels-Uccle, 12 May 1985). Married to Carlo Emanuele Musini (b. 1979, Camden, London, UK) in a civil ceremony on 26 June 2021 in Gubbio, Italy. The religious ceremony took place on 4 September 2021 at the Scots Basilica in Vienna, Austria. The couple has a two children:
  - Georgina Musini (b. 2023)
  - Constantino Musini (b. 2026)
- Princess Marie-Astrid Nora Margarita Veronica of Liechtenstein (b. Brussels-Uccle, 26 June 1987). On 25 September 2021 married to Raphael Worthington V (b. 5 April 1985, U.S.) at Cathedral of Santa Maria Assunta in Orbetello, Italy. The couple has two daughters:
  - Althaea Georgina Worthington (b. 1 July 2022).
  - Aloisia Worthington (b. 2023)
- Prince Josef-Emanuel Leopold Marie of Liechtenstein (b. Brussels-Uccle, 7 May 1989). Married to Colombian María Claudia "Cloclo" Echavarría Suárez (b. 11 July 1988, Colombia), founder of a creative consultancy for Latin American brands named Sí Collective, daughter of late Colombian tycoon Felipe Francisco Echavarría Rocha and wife Evelia "Chiqui" (née Suárez), a prominent figure in the artistic and social life of Cartagena, and descendant of the Spanish Echavarría family clan which arrived in the New Kingdom of Granada in the 17th century and there made fortune, first in agriculture, then in minery and, finally, in textile and construction, on 25 March 2022 at St. Peter Claver Church in Cartagena de Indias, Colombia. The couple has two sons:
  - Prince Leopold of Liechtenstein (b. March 2023)
  - Prince Nikolai of Liechtenstein (b. 21 June 2025)

== Honours ==
=== National honours ===
- Liechtenstein: Grand Star of the Order of Merit of the Principality of Liechtenstein, 1st Class
- Liechtenstein: Recipient of the 70th Birthday Medal of Prince Franz Joseph II

=== Foreign honours ===
- Austria: Grand Cross of the Decoration of Honour for Services to the Republic of Austria, Silver
- Holy See: Knight Grand Cross of the Order of Pope Pius IX
- Luxembourg: Knight Grand Cross of the Order of Adolphe of Nassau
- Luxembourg: Recipient of the Grand Duke Jean Silver Jubilee Medal
- Sovereign Military Order of Malta: Knight of Honour and Devotion of the Sovereign Military Order of Malta, 3rd First Class

== See also ==
- Maria-Pia Kothbauer, Princess of Liechtenstein – Liechtenstein's Ambassador Extraordinary and Plenipotentiary to Austria and the Czech Republic
- Prince Stefan of Liechtenstein – Liechtenstein's Ambassador Extraordinary and Plenipotentiary to the Holy See

Prince Nikolaus of Liechtenstein House of Liechtenstein Born: 24 October 1947
Lines of succession
Preceded by Prince Karl Ludwig	Line of succession to the Liechtensteiner throne 14th position	Succeeded by Prince Josef-Emanuel
