= Félicien Leuridant =

Belgian civil servant and historian

Félicien Albert Leuridant (1880–1939) was a Belgian civil servant and historian who was particularly noted for his work on the life and writings of Charles-Joseph, 7th Prince of Ligne.

== Life ==
Leuridant was born at Belœil, Belgium, on 10 October 1880, the son of a farmer and grain merchant. He was educated at the local primary school, and at the secondary college in Ath, and went on to the Catholic University of Leuven, where he graduated with a Candidature in Philosophy and Letters (Romance Philology) in 1902.

He worked in the local tax office in Belœil from 1902 to 1908, when he was taken on as an employee in the secretariat of the Académie royale de Belgique. He advanced through all the ranks of the service, ending as director of the secretariat. He was also assistant secretary to the Commission royale d'Histoire. He made Brussels his place of residence in 1917. On 20 February 1919, he married Louise-Hortense Dewasmes, with whom he had a son and a daughter.

As a historian, he was particularly interested in the Château de Belœil, near which he had grown up, and its owners, the House of Ligne. He obtained the permission of the tenth Prince of Ligne to edit the unpublished works of Charles-Joseph, 7th Prince of Ligne (1735–1814). In 1914 he organised a commemoration in Ath for the centenary of the prince's death, and in 1935 for the bicentenary of his birth. He also published a series of Annales Prince de Ligne (19 volumes, 1920–1938).

Leuridant had a keen interest in other aspects of local history, and was one of the founders, and a lifelong supporter, of the Ath archaeological association. He was also a contributor to the Biographie Nationale de Belgique.

He died suddenly in Watermaal-Bosvoorde on 27 December 1939.

== Works ==
- Les Bustes de l'Académie royale de Belgique (Brussels, 1917)
- Inventaire sommaire des archives du château de Beloeil (Brussels, 1919)
- Une Éducation de Prince au XVIIIe siècle : Charles-Joseph de Ligne (Brussels, 1923)
- Lettres intimes du chevalier de Lisle au prince de Ligne (Paris, 1924)
- Histoire d'une principauté d'empire : Fagnolle - Ligne - Edelstetten (Paris, 1927)
- L'abbé Pagès et ses chansons (Paris, 1932)
- Français en pays wallon au XVIIIe siècle : esquisses biographiques (Brussels, 1933)
- Galerie belœilloise. Esquisses biographiques (Brussels, 1936)

Editions of works by Charles-Joseph de Ligne

- Coup d'œil sur Belœil (Ath, 1909)
- Colette et Lucas, comédie en 1 acte mêlée d'ariettes (Brussels, 1914)
- Les Embarras, pièce en 1 acte (Paris, 1914)
- Œuvres posthumes inédites (Paris, 1914-1921)
- En marge des rêveries du maréchal de Saxe (Paris, 1919)
- Fragments de l'histoire de ma vie (2 vols, Paris, 1928)
