= Archduchess Yolande of Austria =

Austrian princess (1923–2023)

Archduchess Yolande
- Born: 6 May 1923; Madrid, Spain
- Died: 13 September 2023 (aged 100); Brussels, Belgium
- Burial: 23 September 2023; Imperial Crypt, Vienna, Austria
- Spouse: Archduke Carl Ludwig of Austria (m. 1950; died 2007)
- Issue: Archduke Rudolf; Archduchess Alexandra; Archduke Carl Christian; Archduchess Maria Constanza
Names
- French: Yolande Marie Jeanne Charlotte
- House: Ligne
- Father: Eugène, 11th Prince de Ligne
- Mother: Philippine de Noailles

Archduchess Yolande of Austria (née Princesse Yolande Marie Jeanne Charlotte de Ligne; 6 May 1923 – 13 September 2023) was a Belgian princess of the House of Ligne, and an Austrian archduchess by her marriage to the Archduke Carl Ludwig of Austria, being the daughter of Eugène, 11th Prince of Ligne and Princess Philippine de Noailles.

== Family ==
Yolande was born in Madrid as the second daughter of Eugène, 11th Prince de Ligne and his wife Philippine de Noailles (1898–1991). Her father was the Belgian ambassador to India from 1947 to 1951, ambassador to Spain from 1951 to 1958, and the head of one of Belgium's historically most influential noble families. He died in 1960.

Each of Yolande's two brothers became the Prince de Ligne (Baudouin, 12th Prince de Ligne and Antoine, 13th Prince de Ligne). Antoine is the father of Michel, 14th Prince de Ligne and Princess Christine, wife of Prince Antônio of Orléans-Braganza (second-in-line to the defunct Brazilian throne). Antoine's youngest daughter is named after Yolande.

== Biography ==
=== Marriage and issue ===
On 17 January 1950, at the Château de Belœil, Belgium (the family seat of the House of Ligne), Yolande married Archduke Carl Ludwig of Austria (1918–2007). The fifth child of Austria's last emperor, Charles I and his wife Zita of Bourbon-Parma, Carl Ludwig and Yolande were childhood sweethearts. Wedding guests included Carl Ludwig's eldest brother Crown Prince Otto (claimant to the Habsburg throne) as well as members of half a dozen other royal families; representatives of the Belgian royal family did not, however, attend. The couple honeymooned in Florida, eventually settling in New York City, where Carl Ludwig worked for the Rockefeller Foundation.

They had four children:

- Archduke Rudolf (b. 1950), married Baroness Hélène de Villenfagne de Vogelsanck (b. 1954) in Brussels on 3 July 1976, their family taking up residence in Belgium thereafter. On 29 May 1978 he and his children and male-line descendants were incorporated in the nobility of Belgium by royal letters patent with the style of Serene Highness and the hereditary title "Prince of Habsburg-Lorraine".
- Archduchess Alexandra (born 1952); married Chilean ambassador to the Holy See Héctor Riesle Contreras. They have three children.
- Archduke Carl Christian (born 1954) married Princess Marie Astrid of Luxembourg on 6 February 1982 in Luxembourg. They have five children.
- Archduchess Maria Constanza (born 1957) married Franz Josef, Prince von Auersperg-Trautson. They have four daughters.

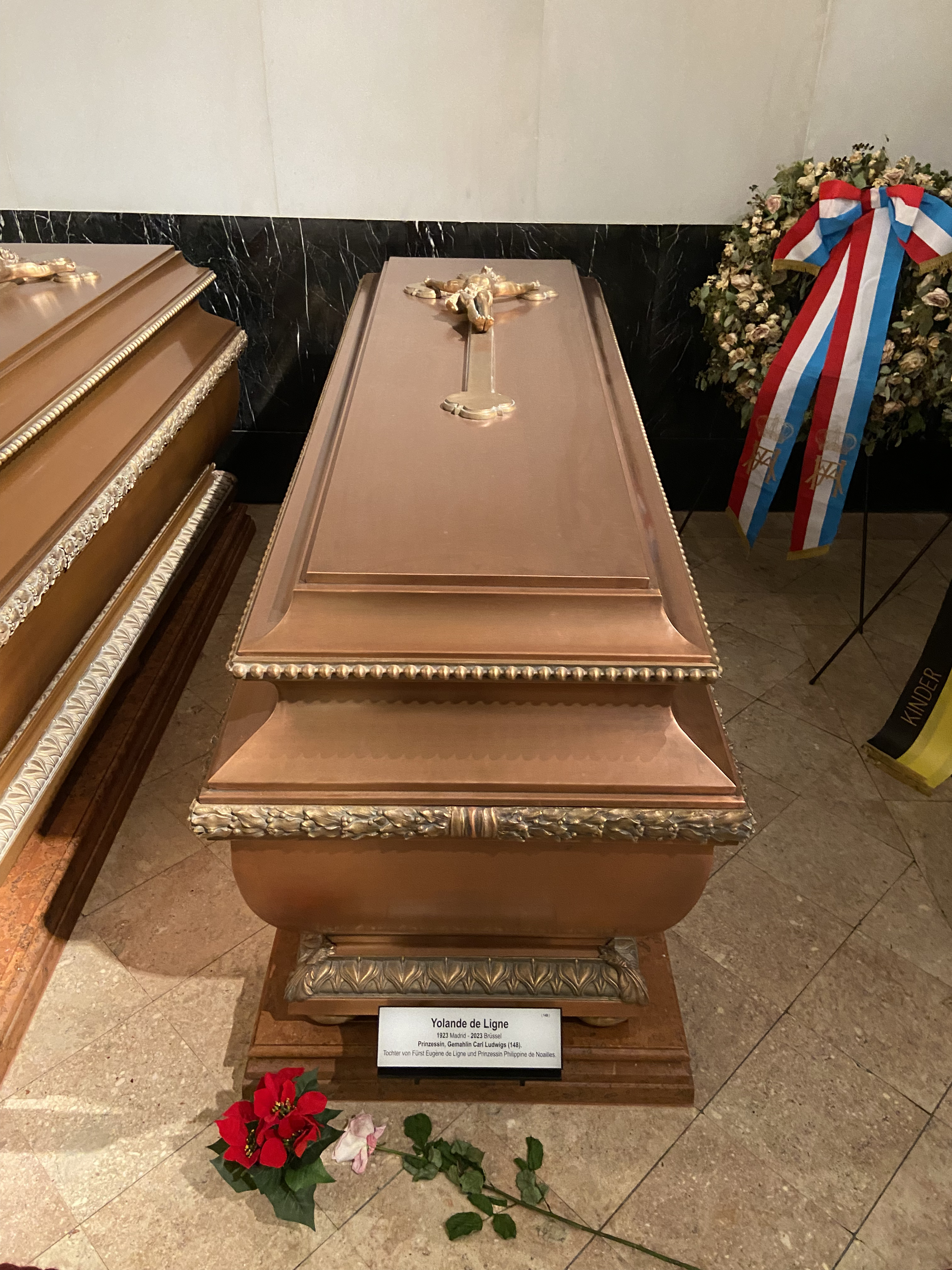
Archduchess Yolande's coffin at Imperial Crypt, Vienna

Yolande turned 100 on 6 May 2023. She died in Brussels on 13 September 2023 and was buried in the Imperial Crypt in Vienna.

== Sources ==
- Brook-Shepherd, Gordon (2003). Uncrowned Emperor: The Life and Times of Otto von Habsburg. London: The Bath Press. ISBN 1-85285-439-1.
- Coddington, John Insley, "The Franco-American Ancestry and Connections of the Archduchess Yolande of Austria: Murat, Fraser, Noailles et al.," The American Genealogist, 64 (July 1989): 171–78.
