= Archduke Charles of Austria (disambiguation) =

Archduke Charles of Austria most commonly refers to Archduke Charles, Duke of Teschen (1771–1847).

The title may also refer to:

- Archduke Carl Christian of Austria (born 1954)
- Archduke Carl Ludwig of Austria (1918–2007)
- Archduke Charles Joseph of Austria (1745–1761)
- Archduke Charles Joseph of Austria (1649–1664)
- Archduke Charles Stephen of Austria (1860–1933)
- Archduke Karl Albrecht of Austria (1888–1951)
- Archduke Karl Ferdinand of Austria (1818–1874)
- Archduke Karl Ludwig of Austria (1833–1896)
- Archduke Karl of Austria-Este (1785–1809)
- Archduke Karl Pius of Austria, Prince of Tuscany (1909–1953)
- Archduke Karl Salvator of Austria (1839–1892)
- Charles I of Austria (1887–1922)
- Charles II, Archduke of Austria (1540–1590)
- Charles of Austria, Bishop of Wroclaw (1590–1624)
- Charles VI, Holy Roman Emperor (1711–1740)
- Infante Carlos of Spain (1607–1632), also an Archduke of Austria
- Karl Habsburg-Lothringen (born 1961), current head of the House of Habsburg-Lorraine
