= Rafael of Orléans-Braganza =

Brazilian prince and claimant to the headship of the Imperial House of Brazil

- Born: 24 April 1986 (age 40); Petrópolis, Rio de Janeiro, Brazil
Names
- Rafael Antonio Maria José Francisco Miguel Gabriel Gonzaga de Orléans e Bragança e Ligne
- House: House of Orléans-Braganza (London branch)
- Father: Antônio of Orléans-Braganza
- Mother: Princess Christine of Ligne

Rafael of Orléans-Braganza (Portuguese: Rafael de Orléans e Bragança; born 24 April 1986) is a member of the Imperial House of Brazil and a claimant to the defunct Brazilian throne. Originating from the Vassouras branch, he served as the heir presumptive to his uncle, Bertrand of Orléans-Braganza, following the death of his father, Antônio, on 8 November 2024, being regarded by its supporters as the holder of the courtesy title of Prince Imperial of Brazil. However, following a major dynastic dispute over his marriage to the Italian aristocrat Margherita delle Piane in November 2026, which was not recognized by his uncle due to traditional rules requiring equal marriages, Rafael formally broke away from the Vassouras line. Rejecting the forced renunciation that would pass his rights to his younger sister, Maria Gabriela of Orléans-Braganza, he established an independent secretariat and announced the formation of the London branch of the House of Orléans-Braganza.

Under this new line, Rafael assumed the headship of the Imperial House of Brazil as a pretender to the throne, directly contesting the legitimacy and succession claims of both the Vassouras branch, currently led by his uncle Bertrand, and the rival Petrópolis branch, led by his cousin Pedro Carlos of Orléans-Braganza, who has historically declared himself a republican. He is a great-great-great-grandson of Brazil’s last reigning emperor, Pedro II of Brazil.

== Family ==
Born in Petrópolis, Brazil on 26 April 1986, he is the third child and second son of Prince Antônio de Orleans e Bragança and Princess Christine of Ligne. He has an older brother and sister, Prince Pedro Luiz and Princess Amélia and a younger sister, Princess Maria Gabriela. His name in full is Rafael Antonio Maria José Francisco Miguel Gabriel Gonzaga de Orléans e Bragança e Ligne.

His paternal grandparents were Prince Pedro Henrique of Orléans-Bragança, one of two claimants to be head of the Brazilian Imperial House, and Princess Maria Elisabeth of Bavaria. His maternal grandparents were Antoine, 13th Prince of Ligne, and Princess Alix of Luxembourg. His mother's family, the House of Ligne, is one of the oldest and most prominent Wallonian noble families still extant in Belgium. Christine is a niece of Grand Duke Jean, who reigned in Luxembourg until his abdication in 2000.

== Personal life ==
Rafael has a degree in manufacturing engineering from Pontifical Catholic University of Rio de Janeiro, working at the InBev subsidiary in London. He is fluent in English, French, Spanish and Portuguese, and also has a predilection for football, being an avowed supporter of Fluminense FC.

Rafael also has a partnership and a tourism enterprise with headquarters in New York, Paris and Rio de Janeiro.

Rafael had previously expressed in statements his desire to marry a princess who is part of "Catholic royalty or high nobility". In May 2026 he announced that he was engaged to Margherita delle Piane, a descendent of an Italian noble family, with their wedding scheduled for November 2026 in Florence. However, Rafael's uncle subsequently refused to give his assent to a marriage to delle Piane, meaning that any such marriage would require Rafael to renounce his dynastic rights, which would automatically pass to his sister Dona Maria Gabriela.

== Appointments ==
In February 2022, after the floods that devastated the city of Petrópolis, Rafael came to the aid of the victims, bringing them essential goods that the imperial house received from monarchist supporters.

In November 2022, on the occasion of the World Cup, Prince Raphael was invited to attend the game by the embassy of the state of Qatar in London, the capital of the United Kingdom, where the prince currently resides and works. The prince is the guest of honor at the opening game of the Brazilian National Team against the Serbian National Football Team, at the Lusail Stadium, in Qatar.

== Honors ==
As member of the House of Orléans-Braganza, Prince Rafael hold the following positions:

- Commander-Major of the Imperial Order of Our Lord Jesus Christ
- Commander-Major of the Imperial Order of Saint Benedict of Aviz
- Commander-Major of the Imperial Order of Saint James of the Sword
- Grand Cross of the Imperial Order of the Cross
- Grand Cross of the Imperial Order of Emperor Pedro I
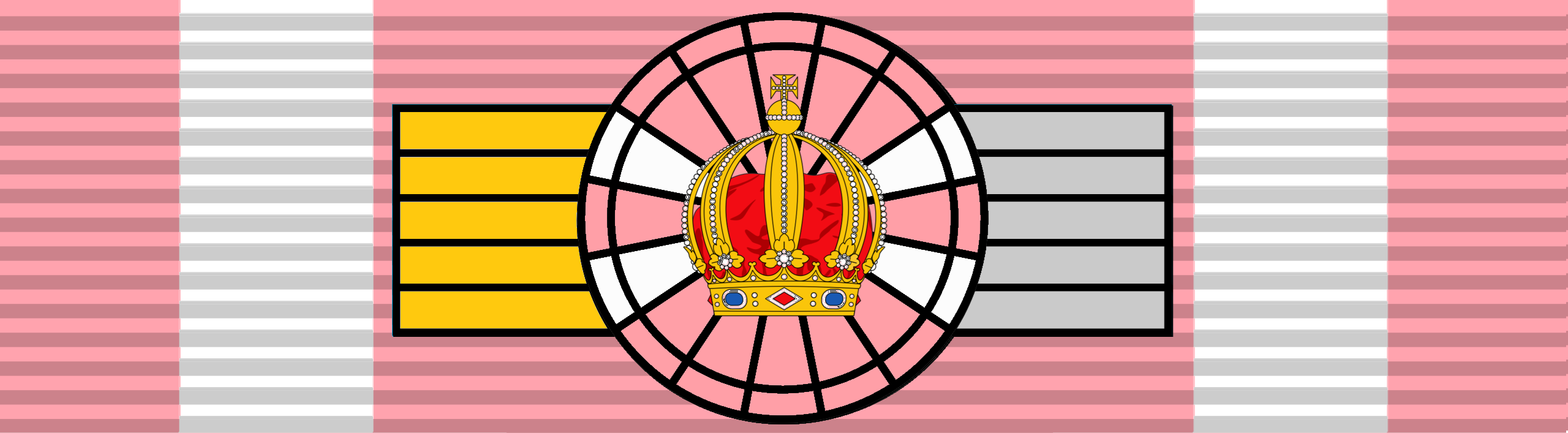
- Grand Cross & Grand Dignitary-Major of the Imperial Order of the Rose

He received the following foreign honors:

- Grand Cross of the Order of the Immaculate Conception of Vila Viçosa

== Genealogy ==
=== Ancestry ===
Ancestors of Rafael of Orléans-Braganza

8. Prince Luiz of Orléans-Braganza
4. Prince Pedro Henrique of Orléans-Braganza
9. Princess Maria di Grazia of Bourbon-Two Sicilies
2. Prince Antônio of Orléans-Braganza
10. Prince Franz of Bavaria
5. Princess Maria Elisabeth of Bavaria
11. Princess Isabella Antonie of Croÿ
1. Prince Rafael of Orléans-Braganza
12. Eugène, 11th Prince of Ligne
6. Antoine, 13th Prince of Ligne
13. Philippine de Noailles
3. Princess Christine of Ligne
14. Prince Felix of Bourbon-Parma
7. Princess Alix Marie of Luxembourg
15. Charlotte, Grand Duchess of Luxembourg

=== Patrilineal descent ===
Rafael is a member of the House of Orléans-Braganza, a sub-branch of the House of Bourbon, itself a branch of the House of Capet and of the Robertians.

Rafael's patriline is the line from which he is descended father to son. It follows the Dukes of Orléans, the Kings of France, the Dukes and Counts of Vendôme, the Counts of La Marche, the first Duke of Bourbon, a Count of Clermont, and before them, again the Kings of France. The line can be traced back more than 1,200 years and is one of the oldest in Europe.

Patrilineal descent
1. Robert II of Worms and Rheingau, 770–807
2. Robert III of Worms and Rheingau, 808–834
3. Robert IV the Strong, 820–866
4. Robert I of France, 866–923
5. Hugh the Great, 895–956
6. Hugh Capet, 941–996
7. Robert II of France, 972–1031
8. Henry I of France, 1008–1060
9. Philip I of France, 1053–1108
10. Louis VI of France, 1081–1137
11. Louis VII of France, 1120–1180
12. Philip II of France, 1165–1223
13. Louis VIII of France, 1187–1226
14. Louis IX of France, 1214–1270
15. Robert, Count of Clermont, 1256–1317
16. Louis I, Duke of Bourbon, c. 1280 – 1342
17. James I, Count of La Marche, 1315–1362
18. John I, Count of La Marche, 1344–1393
19. Louis, Count of Vendôme, c. 1376 – 1446
20. Jean VIII, Count of Vendôme, 1428–1478
21. François, Count of Vendôme, 1470–1495
22. Charles de Bourbon, Duke of Vendôme, 1489–1537
23. Antoine of Navarre, 1518–1562
24. Henry IV of France, 1553–1610
25. Louis XIII of France, 1601–1643
26. Philippe I, Duke of Orléans, 1640–1701
27. Philippe II, Duke of Orléans, 1674–1723
28. Louis d'Orléans, Duke of Orléans, 1703–1752
29. Louis Philippe I, Duke of Orléans, 1725–1785
30. Louis Philippe II, Duke of Orléans, 1747–1793
31. Louis Philippe I, King of the French, 1773–1850
32. Louis, Duke of Nemours, 1814–1896
33. Gaston, comte d'Eu, 1842–1922
34. Prince Luiz of Orléans-Braganza, 1878–1920
35. Prince Pedro Henrique of Orléans-Braganza, 1909–1981
36. Prince Antônio of Orléans-Braganza, 1950–2024
37. Prince Rafael of Orléans-Braganza, 1986–

== See also ==
- Empire of Brazil
- Brazilian Imperial Family
