= Pedro Luiz of Orléans-Braganza =

Brazilian prince (1983–2009)

Pedro Luiz
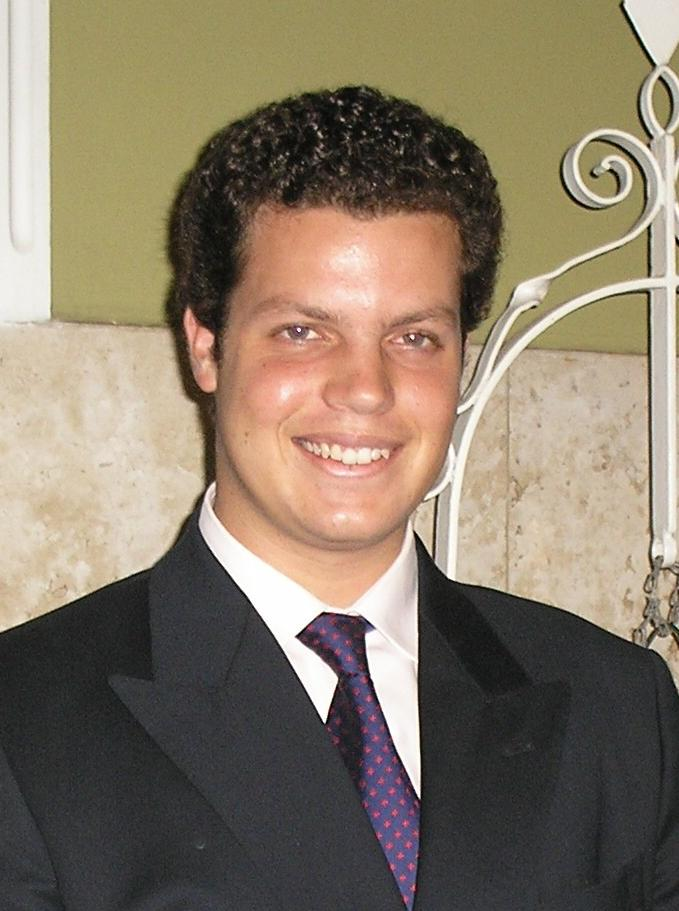
- Pedro Luiz in 2006
- Born: 12 January 1983; Rio de Janeiro, Brazil
- Died: 1 June 2009 (aged 26); Atlantic Ocean aboard Air France Flight 447
- Burial: Imperial Family Mausoleum, Vassouras, Brazil
Names
- Portuguese: Pedro Luiz Maria José Miguel Gabriel Rafael Gonzaga de Orleans e Bragança
- House: House of Orléans-Bragança
- Father: Antônio of Orléans-Braganza
- Mother: Christine of Ligne

Pedro Luiz of Orléans-Braganza (Pedro Luiz Maria José Miguel Gabriel Rafael Gonzaga; 12 January 1983 – 1 June 2009) was a Brazilian prince of the House of Orléans-Braganza. He was the eldest grandson of Prince Pedro Henrique of Orléans-Braganza and Princess Maria Elisabeth of Bavaria. A great-great-grandson of Princess Isabel and her consort Gaston of Orléans, Count of Eu, as well as of Emperor Pedro II and Empress Teresa Cristina, Pedro Luiz occupied a prominent place in the line of succession claimed by Brazilian monarchists. His childless uncle, Bertrand of Orléans-Braganza, is one of the two current claimants to the defunct Brazilian throne, with Pedro Luiz’s father regarded as Bertrand’s immediate successor.

Because of this position, some supporters of Brazilian monarchism expected Pedro Luiz to eventually become the imperial claimant. However, following his death in the crash of Air France Flight 447 in 2009, his younger brother Prince Rafael succeeded him in the line of succession.

== Family ==
Prince Pedro Luiz was born on 12 January 1983 in Rio de Janeiro, the elder of the two sons of Prince António of Orléans-Braganza and his Belgian wife, Princess Christine of Ligne.

His name in full was Pedro Luiz Maria José Miguel Gabriel Rafael Gonzaga de Orleans e Bragança. His paternal grandparents were Prince Pedro Henrique of Orléans-Braganza, one of two claimants to be head of the Brazilian Imperial House, and Princess Maria Elisabeth of Bavaria. His maternal grandparents were Antoine, 13th Prince of Ligne, and Princess Alix of Luxembourg. His mother's family, the House of Ligne, is one of the oldest and most prominent Wallonian noble families still extant in Belgium. Christine is a niece of Grand Duke Jean, who reigned in Luxembourg until his abdication in 2000.

By 2009, his father's two elder brothers, Prince Luiz and Prince Bertrand, were unmarried and had no offspring. His father António was therefore heir to the claim after his older siblings, and Pedro would, in due course, have been a claimant to the traditional headship of the Imperial House of Brazil, and the nominal Brazilian crown. As with most republics, Brazilian constitutional provisions do not allow for the institution of a Royal House.

Pedro descended from all monarchs of the Kingdom of Portugal, including Dom João VI of Portugal, Brazil and the Algarves, and the later monarchs of independent Brazil, emperors Dom Pedro I and Dom Pedro II. He was also a descendant of Louis Philippe I, the Orléanist King of the French in the male line, and a distant nephew, by descent, of John Maurice, Prince of Nassau-Siegen, the 17th-century Dutch prince who was governor of Dutch Brazil in the 1600s.

== Career ==
Pedro Luiz held dual Brazilian-Belgian citizenship and was fluent in Portuguese, English and French. The prince moved in infancy with his family to Petrópolis and was enrolled in the Instituto Social São José (Saint Joseph Social Institute), in which education was directed by nuns, and took secondary studies at the Ipiranga School. He graduated in Business Administration in 2005 from IBMEC in Rio de Janeiro after matriculation in 2001, and undertook postgraduate education in economics at the Fundação Getúlio Vargas. After that he worked at the Mariani Bank in Rio de Janeiro until the end of 2007 when he moved to Luxembourg, where he was hired by BNP Paribas (a leading European bank) and did investment management for several companies.

As a member of the "Vassouras branch" of the Brazilian Imperial Family, he did not share in the income which still flows from all land transactions in Petrópolis under the nineteenth century emphyteutic lease (in contrast to the rival "Petrópolis branch") and was thus able to live comfortably, but "without great luxury". He had no car. He traveled around Rio de Janeiro on foot or by bus. With regard to his lifestyle, he once stated in an interview: "We lead a normal life; we are citizens like everyone else and work to live".

== Dynastic role ==
Styles of Prince Pedro Luiz
- Reference style: His Royal Highness
- Spoken style: Your Royal Highness

In 1993, Brazilians voted on whether to restore the monarchy in a referendum. Luiz and Bertrand, known for their political beliefs, were denounced not only by some monarchists, but also by four of their own younger brothers, who tried unsuccessfully to convince them to renounce their traditional claims to the throne in favour of their brother António, and the young Pedro Luiz. Then only ten years old, Pedro Luiz was seen beside his father during the monarchist restoration campaign. Luiz and Bertrand believed that Pedro Luiz would be a better choice if the monarchy were to be reinstated by the Brazilian people. However, the referendum was not successful, with just 13% of the total tally voting in favor of parliamentary monarchy.

Concerning his status as a prince of a deposed dynasty and of the responsibilities inherent in that position, he affirmed: "We carry this burden and must set an example". He was in search of a suitable fiancée of royal blood, considered an obligation for the future head of the Imperial House of Brazil. In 1999 he became honorary president of Brazil's Monarchist Youth, and also held the Grand Crosses of the Order of Pedro I and of the Order of the Rose.

Pedro Luiz had expressed some opinions about Brazilian politics aside from the monarchy. Regarding the government of President Luiz Inácio Lula da Silva he stated, "I am very pleased with the economic performance of Brazil, all derived from the policy of Lula da Silva. I am a supporter of the political choices of the Brazilian government which, in my opinion, is diminishing the [economic] gap among Brazilians".

Pedro Luiz was considered by many Brazilian monarchists as the prince that gathered "all the hopes and aspirations [of restoration]" due to the "vigor of youth and the seriousness of his character". Duarte Pio, Duke of Bragança and heir of the abolished Portuguese crown, affirmed: "[Pedro Luiz] is a very intelligent person. I have the best reports of him."

== Death ==
Luiz was killed in the crash of Air France Flight 447 on 1 June 2009. His double-cousin Princess Alix of Ligne had planned to travel with him, but took an earlier flight instead. Pedro Luiz's body was among those retrieved from the ocean and was buried in Vassouras in the family's mausoleum on 5 July 2009.

== Genealogy ==
=== Ancestry ===
Ancestors of Pedro Luiz of Orléans-Braganza

8. Prince Luiz of Orléans-Braganza
4. Prince Pedro Henrique of Orléans-Braganza
9. Princess Maria di Grazia of Bourbon-Two Sicilies
2. Prince Antônio of Orléans-Braganza
10. Prince Franz of Bavaria
5. Princess Maria Elisabeth of Bavaria
11. Princess Isabella Antonie of Croÿ
1. Prince Pedro Luiz of Orléans-Braganza
12. Eugène, 11th Prince of Ligne
6. Antoine, 13th Prince of Ligne
13. Philippine de Noailles
3. Princess Christine of Ligne
14. Prince Felix of Bourbon-Parma
7. Princess Alix Marie of Luxembourg
15. Charlotte, Grand Duchess of Luxembourg

=== Patrilineal descent ===
Pedro Luiz was a member of the House of Orléans-Braganza, a sub-branch of the House of Bourbon, itself a branch of the House of Capet and of the Robertians.

Pedro Luiz' patriline is the line from which he is descended father to son. It follows the Dukes of Orléans, the Kings of France, the Dukes and Counts of Vendôme, the Counts of La Marche, the first Duke of Bourbon, a Count of Clermont, and before them, again the Kings of France. The line can be traced back more than 1,200 years and is one of the oldest in Europe.

Patrilineal descent
1. Robert II of Worms and Rheingau, 770–807
2. Robert III of Worms and Rheingau, 808–834
3. Robert IV the Strong, 820–866
4. Robert I of France, 866–923
5. Hugh the Great, 895–956
6. Hugh Capet, 941–996
7. Robert II of France, 972–1031
8. Henry I of France, 1008–1060
9. Philip I of France, 1053–1108
10. Louis VI of France, 1081–1137
11. Louis VII of France, 1120–1180
12. Philip II of France, 1165–1223
13. Louis VIII of France, 1187–1226
14. Louis IX of France, 1214–1270
15. Robert, Count of Clermont, 1256–1317
16. Louis I, Duke of Bourbon, c. 1280 – 1342
17. James I, Count of La Marche, 1315–1362
18. John I, Count of La Marche, 1344–1393
19. Louis, Count of Vendôme, c. 1376 – 1446
20. Jean VIII, Count of Vendôme, 1428–1478
21. François, Count of Vendôme, 1470–1495
22. Charles de Bourbon, Duke of Vendôme, 1489–1537
23. Antoine of Navarre, 1518–1562
24. Henry IV of France, 1553–1610
25. Louis XIII of France, 1601–1643
26. Philippe I, Duke of Orléans, 1640–1701
27. Philippe II, Duke of Orléans, 1674–1723
28. Louis d'Orléans, Duke of Orléans, 1703–1752
29. Louis Philippe I, Duke of Orléans, 1725–1785
30. Louis Philippe II, Duke of Orléans, 1747–1793
31. Louis Philippe I, King of the French, 1773–1850
32. Louis, Duke of Nemours, 1814–1896
33. Gaston, comte d'Eu, 1842–1922
34. Prince Luiz of Orléans-Braganza, 1878–1920
35. Prince Pedro Henrique of Orléans-Braganza, 1909–1981
36. Prince Antônio of Orléans-Braganza, 1950–2024
37. Prince Pedro Luiz of Orléans-Braganza, 1983–2009

== See also ==
- Empire of Brazil
- Brazilian Imperial Family
