= Michel, Prince of Ligne =

Belgian noble (born 1951)

Michel
- Prince de Ligne
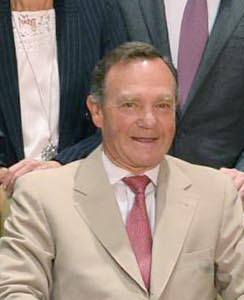
- Pictured in July 2016

14th Prince of Ligne
- Tenure: 21 August 2005 – present
- Predecessor: Antoine, 13th Prince of Ligne
- Heir apparent: Henri Antoine, Hereditary Prince
- Full name: Michel Charles Eugène Marie Lamoral de Ligne
- Born: 26 May 1951 (age 75); Château de Belœil, Belœil, Belgium
- Noble family: Ligne
- Spouse: Princess Eleonora of Orléans-Braganza (m. 1981)
- Issue: Princess Alix of Ligne; Henri Antoine, Hereditary Prince of Ligne
- Father: Antoine, 13th Prince of Ligne
- Mother: Princess Alix of Luxembourg

Michel de Ligne, 14th Prince de Ligne, Prince d'Épinoy, Prince d'Amblise, GE (Michel Charles Eugène Marie Lamoral; born 26 May 1951) is the head of the princely House of Ligne. He is the eldest son of Antoine, 13th Prince de Ligne, and his wife, Princess Alix of Luxembourg; he is thus a nephew of the late Jean, Grand Duke of Luxembourg, and a cousin of former reigning Grand Duke Henri. He is also a Knight of the Order of the Golden Fleece in Austria.

== Early life ==
Michel was born 26 May 1951 as the first child of Belgian nobleman Prince Antoine of Ligne (youngest child of Prince Eugène, 11th Prince of Ligne and his wife Philippine de Noailles) and his wife Princess Alix of Luxembourg (youngest daughter of Charlotte, Grand Duchess of Luxembourg and her consort Prince Felix né: Prince of Bourbon-Parma).

At the time of his birth, Michel was third in line of succession to the title of Prince of Ligne; he was also the first grandchild of his maternal grandparents.

== Marriage and children ==
On 10 March 1981 in Rio de Janeiro, Michel married Princess Eleonora of Orléans-Braganza (born 20 May 1953 in Jacarezinho), daughter of Prince Pedro Henrique of Orléans-Braganza and Princess Maria Elisabeth of Bavaria.

== Arms ==
Heraldry of Michel, 14th Prince of Ligne

Coat of arms as Grandee of Spain
(2005–present)

Michel, Prince of Ligne House of Ligne Born: 26 May 1951
Belgian nobility
Preceded by Antoine	Prince de Ligne; 2005 – present	Incumbent; Heir: Henri
