= Claude Lamoral, 6th Prince of Ligne =

Claude Lamoral
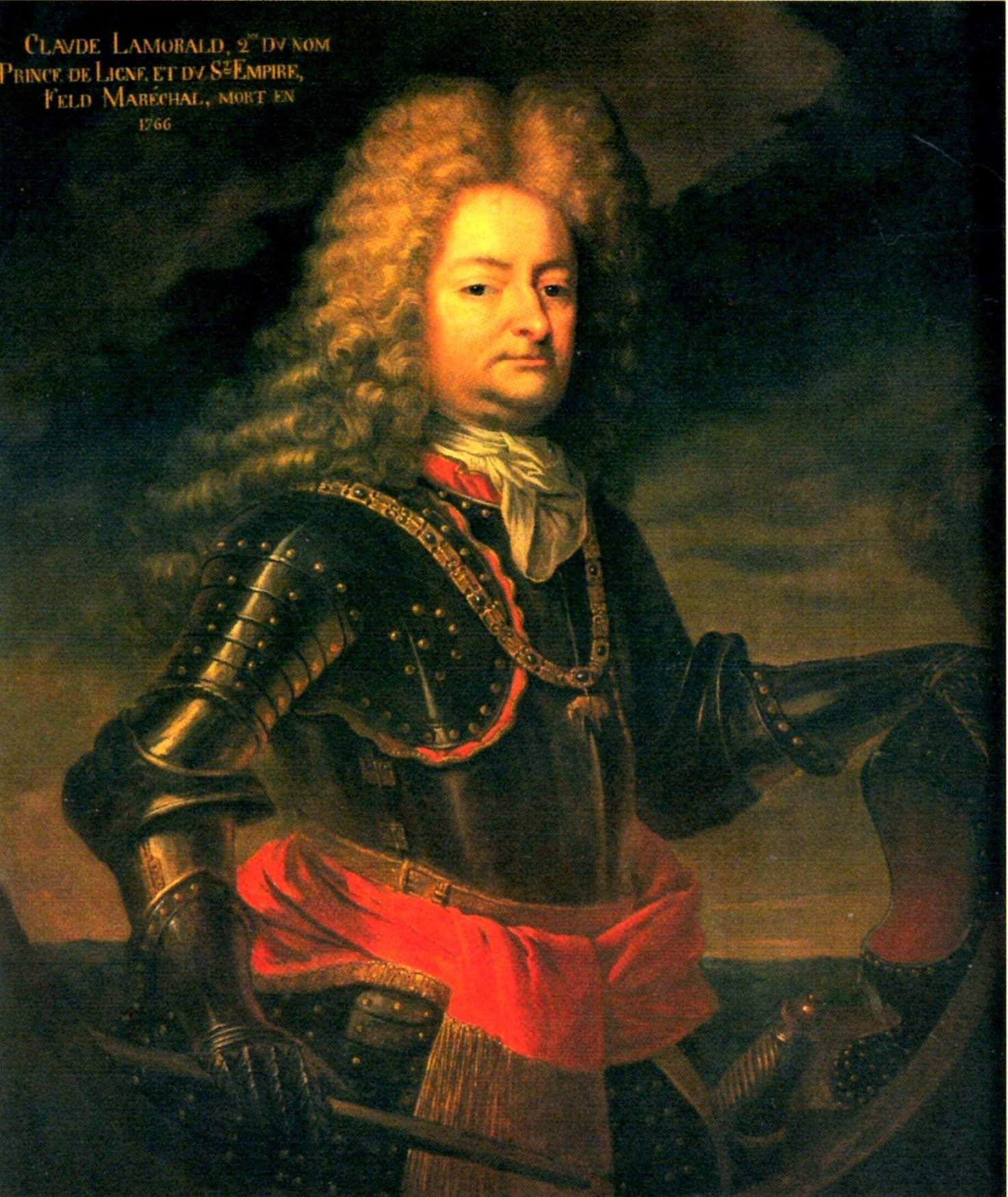
- Late Prince Claude Lamoral Portrait

Prince of Ligne
- Reign: 9 August 1750 – 7 April 1766
- Predecessor: Antoine
- Successor: Charles-Joseph
- Born: 7 August 1685
- Died: 7 April 1766 (aged 80); Château de Belœil
- Spouse: Elisabeth Alexandrine de Salm
- Issue: Prince Henri Ernest; Princess Louise Marie; Princess Marie Josephe; Charles-Joseph
Names
- Claude Lamoral de Ligne
- House: House of Ligne
- Father: Henri, 4th Prince of Ligne
- Mother: Juana Monica de Aragon y Benavides de Cordona y de Cordoba

Claude Lamoral, Prince of Ligne (7 August 1685 – Chateau de Beloeil, 7 April 1766) was a Field marshal and sixth Prince in the House of Ligne.

A state councilor, he reorganized the army in the newly conquered Austrian Netherlands, and in 1720 took possession in the name of the Emperor of the fortified cities of Tournai, Ypres and Menen. This voyage through Flanders and Hainaut was accompanied by great pomp and celebration, many Te Deums and numerous receptions in every city.

One of his major projects was the development of the estate of Belœil. He invested significant resources in the renovation of the castle and its gardens. Prince Claude-Lamoral sought to model aspects of the estate after the Palace of Versailles of Louis XIV and employed the Parisian architect Jean-Michel Chevotet for parts of the project.

Prince Claude-Lamoral married Elisabeth Alexandrine de Salm, daughter of Louis Otto, Prince of Salm, and was father of Charles-Joseph, 7th Prince of Ligne, Louise (1728–1784), and Marie (1730–1783).

Claude Lamoral, 6th Prince of Ligne House of Ligne Born: 7 August 1685 Died: 7 April 1766
Regnal titles
Preceded by Antoine	Prince of Ligne; 1750–1766	Succeeded by Charles-Joseph
