= Princess Alix of Luxembourg =

Princess of Ligne (1929–2019)

Princess Alix
- Princess de Ligne
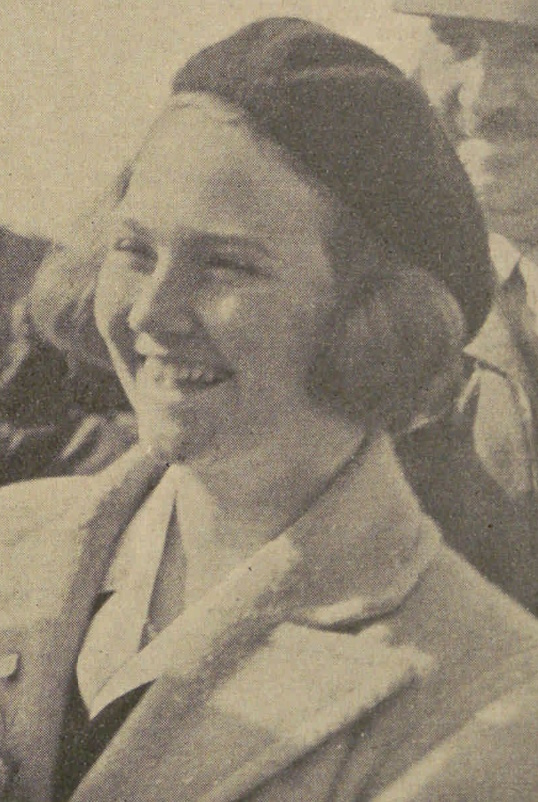
- Princess Alix in 1945
- Born: 24 August 1929; Berg Castle, Colmar-Berg, Luxembourg
- Died: 11 February 2019 (aged 89); Château de Belœil, Belgium
- Spouse: Antoine, 13th Prince of Ligne (m. 1950; died 2005)
- Issue Detail: Michel, 14th Prince of Ligne; Prince Wauthier; Princess Anne-Marie; Princess Christine of Orléans-Braganza; Princess Sophie, Comtesse de Nicolay; Prince Antoine; Princess Yolande
Names
- Alix Marie Anne Antoinette Charlotte Gabrielle
- House: Nassau-Weilburg (official); Bourbon-Parma (agnatic)
- Father: Prince Felix of Bourbon-Parma
- Mother: Charlotte, Grand Duchess of Luxembourg

Alix, Princess de Ligne (Alix Marie Anne Antoinette Charlotte Gabrielle; 24 August 1929 – 11 February 2019) was the fourth daughter and youngest child of Charlotte, Grand Duchess of Luxembourg, and Felix of Bourbon-Parma. She was, by birth, Princess of Luxembourg, Princess of Nassau and Princess of Bourbon-Parma. She was a sister of Grand Duke Jean and aunt of Grand Duke Henri.

== World War II ==
Facing the German invasion on 10 May 1940 during World War II, the Grand Ducal Family of Luxembourg left the country to find refuge in Portugal, after receiving transit visas from the Portuguese consul Aristides de Sousa Mendes, in June 1940. They arrived at Vilar Formoso on 23 June 1940. After travelling through Coimbra and Lisbon, the family first stayed in Cascais, in Casa de Santa Maria, owned by Manuel Espírito Santo, who was then the honorary consul for Luxembourg in Portugal. By July they had moved to Monte Estoril, staying at the Chalet Posser de Andrade. On 10 July 1940, Princess Alix, together with her father Prince Félix, her siblings, Heir Prince Jean, Princess Elisabeth, Princess Marie Adelaide, Princess Marie Gabriele and Prince Charles, the nanny Justine Reinard and the chauffeur Eugène Niclou, along with his wife Joséphine, boarded the S.S. Trenton headed for New York City. With her sisters, she studied at the Collège Jésus-Marie de Sillery, near Quebec City.

== Marriage and issue ==
On 17 August 1950 in Luxembourg Princess Alix married Antoine, 13th Prince de Ligne, (8 March 1925 – 21 August 2005). They have issue:

- Michel, 14th Prince de Ligne (born 26 May 1951). He married Princess Eleonora of Orléans-Braganza on 10 March 1981. They have two children and two grandchildren.
- Prince Wauthier de Ligne (10 July 1952 – 15 August 2022). He married Countess Regine de Renesse. They have three children and seven grandchildren. His funeral took place at the church of Saint-Pierre de Belœil on 22 August 2022.
- Princess Anne of Ligne (born 3 April 1954). She married Olivier Mortgat on 30 May 1981. They have two daughters.
- Princess Christine of Ligne (born 11 August 1955). She married Prince Antonio of Orléans-Braganza (1950–2024) on 25 September 1981. They have four children, including Pedro Luiz of Orléans-Braganza (1983-2009) and Rafael of Orléans-Braganza (born 1986), and two grandchildren.
- Princess Sophie of Ligne (born 23 April 1957). She married Count Philippe de Nicolay, son of Marie-Hélène de Rothschild, on 26 June 1982. They have two sons.
- Prince Antoine Lamoral de Ligne (born 28 December 1959). He married Countess Jacqueline de Lannoy on 16 June 2001. They have three children.
- Princess Yolande de Ligne (born 16 June 1964). She married Hugo Townsend (born 1945), son of Group Captain Peter Townsend, in 1994. They have four children.

== Death ==
Princess Alix died on 11 February 2019 at Beloeil Castle. She was buried at Beloeil Castle in Belgium and a service was held at the Mëchelskierch church in Luxembourg City.

A statement from Grand Ducal Court said at the time: “It is with great sadness that Their Royal Highnesses Grand Duke Jean, the Grand Duke and the Grand Duchess announce the death, today, of Her Royal Highness the Princess Alix, Princess of Ligne, Princess of Luxembourg.”
