= Beloeil =

Beloeil or Belœil may refer to:

- Beloeil, Belgium, a municipality in Hainaut, Belgium
  - Château of Belœil
- Beloeil, Quebec, a city in Quebec, Canada
- Mont Saint-Hilaire or Mont Beloeil, Quebec, Canada
