= Antoine, Prince of Ligne =

Belgian prince

Antoine
- Prince de Ligne
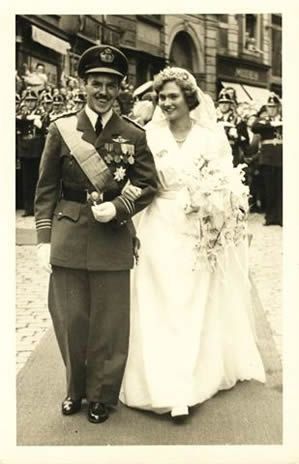
- Antoine (left) with his wife, Princess Alix of Luxembourg (right) on their wedding day, dated 17 August 1950.

13th Prince of Ligne
- Tenure: 3 March 1985 – 21 August 2005
- Predecessor: Baudouin, 12th Prince of Ligne
- Successor: Michel, 14th Prince of Ligne
- Full name: Antoine Maria Joachim Lamoral de Ligne
- Born: 8 March 1925; Brussels, Belgium
- Died: 21 August 2005 (aged 80); Château de Belœil, Belœil, Belgium
- Noble family: Ligne
- Spouse: Princess Alix of Luxembourg (m. 1950)
- Issue: Michel, 14th Prince of Ligne; Prince Wauthier; Princess Anne-Marie; Princess Christine; Princess Sophie; Prince Antoine; Princess Yolande
- Father: Eugène, 11th Prince of Ligne
- Mother: Philippine de Noailles

Antoine Maria Joachim Lamoral de Ligne, 13th Prince of Ligne, Prince of Épinoy, Prince of Amblise, GE (8 March 1925 – 21 August 2005) was the son of Eugène, 11th Prince of Ligne, and his wife, Philippine de Noailles.

== Life and career ==
Prince Antoine escaped from occupied Belgium in February 1943 and joined the RAF in June. After initial training in England, he won his wings at No. 34 Flying Training School in Medicine Hat, Canada, before returning to the UK for operational duty from December 1944 as a 2nd Lt. in the Belgian Air Force flying Spitfires with 349 Squadron.

Post-war, he attended the Central Flying School as a flying instructor with the reformed Belgian Air Force. Moved to 160 Wing until detached to Palestine on behalf of the Ministry of Foreign Affairs as UN Truce Observer during the formation of the State of Israel.

Promoted to Captain in December 1948, he served as Deputy Flight Commander of 2 Squadron during 1949–50. Served as Assistant Military Attache in Washington 1952–3, before returning to Belgium as Captain-Commandant to assume command of 9 Squadron flying Gloster Meteor 8s.

Prince Antoine resigned his commission on 1 September 1955 to join the first Belgian Antarctic Expedition under Commandant Gaston de Gerlache (with whom he had trained in the RAF in 1943), leaving Belgium in 1957. He flew many exploration flights over Antarctica in Austers and Bell 47 helicopters until returning to Belgium in March 1959; also took part in the subsequent Belgian expeditions in 1960 and 1965.

He was the President of the Royal Belgian Aero Club for 20 years and President of the Belgian National Appeal for the World Wildlife Appeal for 10 years. He is a Chevalier of the Orders of Leopold and Leopold II and an Officer of the Order of the Crown. He was the 1,294th Knight of the Order of the Golden Fleece in Austria.

He died on 21 August 2005 at the castle of Belœil in Belœil, Belgium.

== Family ==
He married Princess Alix of Luxembourg (24 August 1929 – 11 February 2019), daughter of Prince Felix of Bourbon-Parma and Charlotte, Grand Duchess of Luxembourg, on 17 August 1950 in Luxembourg.

They had seven children:

- Michel, 14th Prince de Ligne (born 26 May 1951). He married Princess Eleonora of Orléans-Braganza on 10 March 1981. They have two children and two grandchildren.
- Prince Wauthier de Ligne (10 July 1952 – 15 August 2022). He married Countess Regine de Renesse. They have three children and seven grandchildren. His funeral took place at the church of Saint-Pierre de Belœil on 22 August 2022.
- Princess Anne of Ligne (born 3 April 1954). She married Olivier Mortgat on 30 May 1981. They have two daughters.
- Princess Christine of Ligne (born 11 August 1955). She married Prince Antonio of Orléans-Braganza (1950–2024) on 25 September 1981. They have four children, including Pedro Luiz of Orléans-Braganza (1983-2009) and Rafael of Orléans-Braganza (born 1986), and two grandchildren.
- Princess Sophie of Ligne (born 23 April 1957). She married Count Philippe de Nicolay, son of Marie-Hélène de Rothschild, on 26 June 1982. They have two sons.
- Prince Antoine Lamoral de Ligne (born 28 December 1959). He married Countess Jacqueline de Lannoy on 16 June 2001. They have three children.
- Princess Yolande de Ligne (born 16 June 1964). She married Hugo Townsend (born 1945), son of Group Captain Peter Townsend, in 1994. They have four children.

== Ancestry ==
Ancestors of Antoine, Prince of Ligne

16. Eugène, 8th Prince of Ligne
8. Prince Henri Maximilien of Ligne
17. Mélanie de Conflans
4. Ernest, 10th Prince of Ligne
18. Count Ernest de Talleyrand-Périgord
9. Marguerite de Talleyrand-Périgord
19. Marie Louise Lepelletier de Morfontaine
2. Eugène, 11th Prince of Ligne
20. Timoléon de Cossé, Duc de Brissac
10. Roland de Cossé, Marquis de Brissac
21. Marguerite Le Lievre de La Grange
5. Diane de Cossé-Brissac
22. Constant André Say
11. Jeanne Marie Say
23. Jeanne Marie Emilie Wey
1. Antoine, 13th Prince of Ligne
24. Charles Philippe Henri de Noailles
12. Antonin-Just-Léon-Marie de Noailles
25. Anne Marie Cécile de Noailles
6. François Joseph Eugène Napoléon de Noailles
26. Prince Napoleon Lucien Charles Murat
13. Princess Anne Murat
27. Caroline Georgina Fraser
3. Philippine de Noailles
28. Ernest Dubois, Vicomte de Courval
14. Arthur Constant, 3rd Baron Dubois de Courval
29. Isabelle Moreau
7. Madeleine Dubois de Courval
30. Richard Ray
15. Mary Ray
31. Mary Rebecca Boggs

Antoine, Prince of Ligne House of Ligne Born: 8 March 1925 Died: 21 August 2005
Belgian nobility
Preceded by Baudouin	Prince of Ligne; 1985–2005	Succeeded by Michel
