= Archduke Carl Ludwig of Austria (1918–2007) =

Austrian entrepreneur and nobleman (1918–2007)

Archduke Carl Ludwig
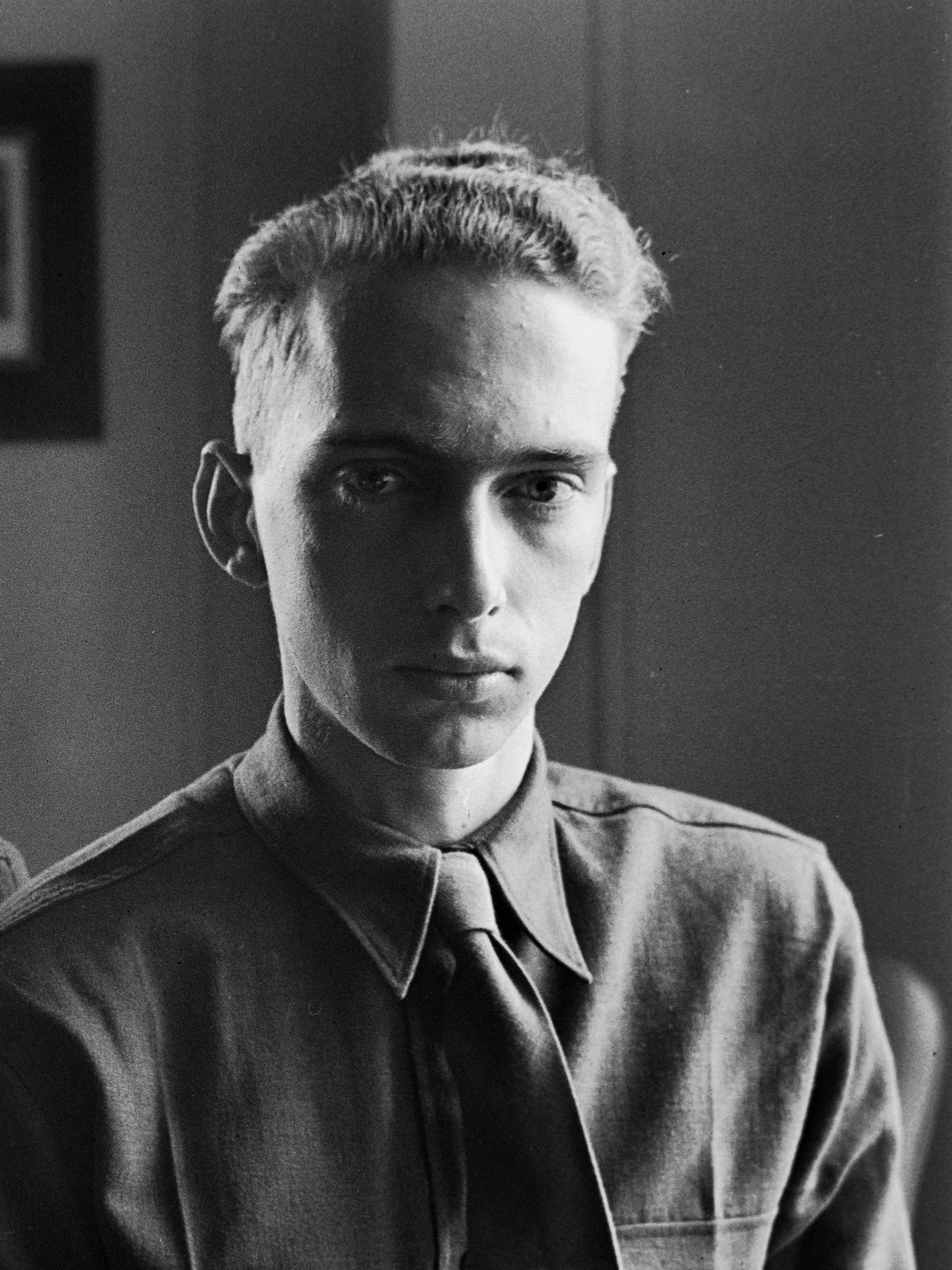
- Carl Ludwig in 1941
- Born: 10 March 1918; Baden bei Wien, Baden District, Austria-Hungary
- Died: 11 December 2007 (aged 89); Brussels, Belgium
- Burial: Imperial Crypt
- Spouse: Princess Yolande of Ligne (m. 1950)
- Issue: Archduke Rudolf; Archduchess Alexandra; Archduke Carl Christian; Archduchess Maria Constanza
Names
- Carl Ludwig Maria Franz Joseph Michael Gabriel Antonius Robert Stephan Pius Gregor Ignatius Markus d'Aviano Habsburg-Lothringen
- House: Habsburg-Lorraine
- Father: Charles I of Austria
- Mother: Zita of Bourbon-Parma

Archduke Carl Ludwig of Austria (Carl Ludwig Maria Franz Joseph Michael Gabriel Antonius Robert Stephan Pius Gregor Ignatius Markus d'Aviano; 10 March 1918 – 11 December 2007), also known as Carl Ludwig Habsburg-Lothringen, was the fifth child of Charles I of Austria and Princess Zita of Bourbon-Parma. He was born in Baden bei Wien and died in Brussels.

== Life ==
He studied at the University of Louvain and graduated from Université Laval, in Quebec City where his family was in exile. During the Second World War, Karl Ludwig and his brother Felix volunteered to serve in the 101st Infantry Battalion of the United States Army, known as the "Free Austria Battalion". However, the battalion was disbanded when a number of exiled Jewish volunteers who made up the majority of the force ultimately declined to confirm their enlistment.

He was buried beside his mother in the Kapuziner Crypt in Vienna.

== Marriage and issue ==
He was married in Belœil on 17 January 1950 to Princess Yolande of Ligne (6 May 1923 – 13 September 2023). They had four children:

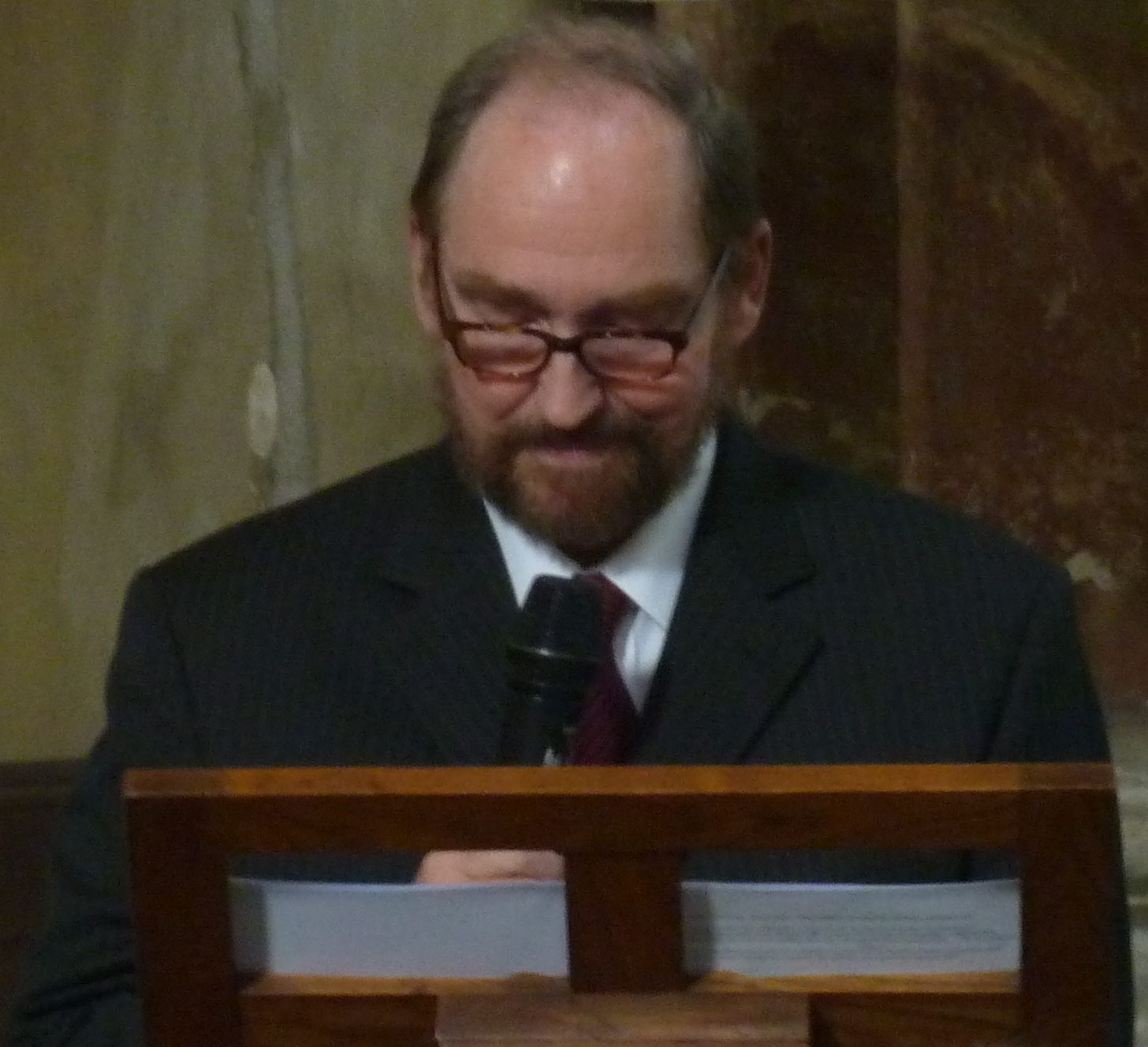
Archduke Rudolf, eldest son of Carl Ludwig, during a presentation about his grandmother Zita in 2014

- Archduke Rudolf of Austria (Rudolf Maria Carl Eugen Anna Antonius Marcus d'Aviano, born 17 November 1950), married Baroness Hélène de Villenfagne de Vogelsanck (born 24 April 1954) in Brussels on 3 July 1976; their family took up residence in Belgium thereafter. On 29 May 1978, he, his children and male-line descendants were incorporated into the nobility of Belgium by royal letters patent with the hereditary title of Prince/sse de Habsbourg-Lorraine and the style of Serene Highness. Rudolf works at investment managers AAA Gestion, based in Villars-sur-Glâne, Switzerland, and he lives at De Diesbach Castle. He and his wife have eight children, who were later recognised by the Head of the Imperial House of Austria as Archdukes and Archduchesses of Austria:
  - Archduke Carl Christian of Austria (b. 1977), married on 2 June 2007 to Estelle Lapra de Saint-Romain (1979–2025), with five children:
    - Archduchess Zita of Austria (b. 16 January, 2008)
    - Archduchess Anezka of Austria (b. 12 March, 2010)
    - Archduchess Anna of Austria (b. 3 September, 2012)
    - Archduchess Paola of Austria (b. 20 August, 2014)
    - Archduke Pier-Giorgio of Austria (b. 22 September, 2020)
  - Archduchess Priscilla of Austria (b. 1979), engaged in 2022 to Gabriel Contreras Millán.
  - Archduke Johannes of Austria (b. 1981), Catholic priest of the Swiss Fraternity Eucharistein.
  - Archduke Thomas of Austria (b. 1983), member of the Swiss Catholic Fraternity Eucharistein.
  - Archduchess Marie-des-Neiges of Austria (b. 1986), former member of the Swiss Catholic Fraternity Eucharistein; left in 2024 for reasons unknown.
  - Archduke Franz-Ludwig of Austria (b. 1988), married in 2018 to Mathilde Vignon (b. 1992). They have one daughter.
  - Archduke Michael of Austria (b. 1990), engaged in 2025 to Jane Dornbierer Wu.
  - Archduke Joseph of Austria (b. 1991), married in a civil ceremony on 29 December 2025, and in a religious ceremony on 31 December 2025 to Marie-Gabrielle Pélissié du Rausas (b. 1998). He is a former member of the Swiss Catholic Fraternity Eucharistein; left in 2022 for reasons unknown.
- Archduchess Alexandra of Austria (born 10 July 1952), married Chilean ambassador to the Holy See Héctor Riesle Contreras (born 16 Feb 1943). They had three children:
  - Felipe Riesle de Habsburgo-Lorena (b. 1986), married to Pilar García-Huidobro Echeverría.
  - María Sofía Riesle de Habsburgo-Lorena (b. 1987), married to Rodrigo Risopatrón Montero.
  - Constanza Riesle de Habsburgo-Lorena (b. 1989), married to Sebastián Prieto Donoso.
- Archduke Carl Christian of Austria (born 26 August 1954), married Princess Marie Astrid of Luxembourg. Like his elder brother, he works at investment managers AAA Gestion, based in Villars-sur-Glâne, Switzerland. He and his wife have five children:
  - Archduchess Marie-Christine Anne Astrid Zita Charlotte of Austria (b. 31 July 1983, Brussels, Belgium). Her engagement was announced on 16 May 2008 to Count Rodolphe Christian Léopold Carl Ludwig Phillipe de Limburg-Stirum (b. 20 March 1979, Uccle, Brussels, Belgium). On 6 December 2008, they married in a civil ceremony at Mechelen town hall in Mechelen, Belgium, and then had a religious ceremony at St. Rumbold's Cathedral in Mechelen, Belgium. They have three sons:
    - Count Léopold Menno Philippe Gabriel François-Xavier Marie Joseph Ghislain de Limburg-Stirum (b. 19 April 2011, Buenos Aires, Argentina).
    - Count Constantin de Limburg-Stirum (b. 25 October 2013, Buenos Aires, Argentina).
    - Count Gabriel de Limburg-Stirum (b. 2016).
  - Archduke Imre Emanuel Simeon Jean Carl Marcus d'Aviano of Austria (b. 8 December 1985, Geneva, Switzerland), his engagement to Kathleen Elizabeth Walker (b. 17 April 1986, Cincinnati, Ohio, US), was announced on 22 December 2011. They met in April 2010. The couple got married on 8 December 2012 at Saint Mary, Mother of God Catholic Church in Washington, D.C., United States. They have six children:
    - Archduchess Maria-Stella Elizabeth Christiana Yolande Alberta of Austria (b. 11 November 2013, Kirchberg, Luxembourg).
    - Archduchess Magdalena Maria Alexandra Zita Charlotte of Austria (b. 24 February 2016, Kirchberg, Luxembourg).
    - Archduchess Juliana Marie Christine Wilhelmina Margaret Astrid of Austria (b. 14 October 2018, Geneva, Switzerland).
    - Archduchess Cecilia Marie Josephine Adelaide Henrietta of Austria (b. 15 January 2021, Geneva, Switzerland).
    - Archduke Karl Maria Thomas Rafael Christian Robert Marcus d'Aviano of Austria (b. 4 June 2023, Geneva, Switzerland).
    - Archduke Benedikt Maria Gabriel Rodolphe Jean Charles Marcus d'Aviano of Austria (b. 29 April 2026).
  - Archduke Christoph Henri Alexander Maria Marcus d'Aviano of Austria (b. 2 February 1988, Geneva, Switzerland). His engagement to Adélaïde Marie Béatrice Drapé-Frisch (b. 4 September 1989, Les Lilas, Paris, France), was announced on 22 December 2011. The couple married on 29 December 2012 at Basilique Saint-Epvre de Nancy in Nancy, France. They have four children:
    - Archduchess Katarina Marie-Christine Fabiola of Austria (b. 22 December 2014, Geneva, Switzerland).
    - Archduchess Sophia of Austria (b. 31 August 2017, Geneva, Switzerland).
    - Archduke Josef of Austria (b. October 2020, Geneva, Switzerland).
    - Archduchess Flavia of Austria (b. 2023).
  - Archduke Alexander Hector Marie Karl Leopold Marcus d'Aviano of Austria (b. 26 September 1990, Meyrin, Switzerland). He married on 30 September 2023 at Belœil, Belgium, to Natacha Roumiantzeff-Pachkevitch. They divorced in 2025.
  - Archduchess Gabriella Maria Pilar Yolande Joséphine-Charlotte of Austria (b. 26 March 1994, Geneva, Switzerland). She became engaged to Prince Henri Luitpold Antoine Victor Marie Joseph of Bourbon-Parma (b. 14 October 1991, Roskilde, Denmark), on 22 October 2017. The couple were married on 12 September 2020 at Tratzberg Castle in Jenbach, Tyrol, Austria. They have three daughters:
    - Princess Victoria Antonia Marie-Astrid Lydia of Bourbon-Parma (b. 30 October 2017, Geneva, Switzerland).
    - Princess Anastasia Erika Alexandra Marie Yolande of Bourbon-Parma (b. 3 July 2021, Geneva, Switzerland).
    - Princess Philippina of Bourbon-Parma (b. 2023).
- Archduchess Maria Constanza of Austria (born 19 October 1957), married Franz Josef, Prince (Fürst) von Auersperg-Trautson (born 11 December 1954) in Belœil, Belgium, on 18 June 1994. They have three biological daughters (one died shortly after her birth) and one adopted daughter, Anna Maria (who bear the family name Prinzessin von Auersperg-Trautson and the courtesy title of Princess of Auersperg-Trautson):
  - Princess Anna Maria of Auersperg-Trautson (b. 24 September 1997).
  - Princess Alexandra Maria of Auersperg-Trautson (b. and d. 9 February 1998).
  - Princess Ladislaya of Auersperg-Trautson (b. 26 February 1999).
  - Princess Eleonora of Auersperg-Trautson (b. 28 May 2002).

== Ancestry ==
Ancestors of Archduke Carl Ludwig of Austria (1918–2007)

8. Archduke Karl Ludwig of Austria
4. Archduke Otto Franz of Austria
9. Princess Maria Annunziata of Bourbon-Two Sicilies
2. Charles I of Austria
10. George of Saxony
5. Princess Maria Josepha of Saxony
11. Infanta Maria Ana of Portugal
1. Archduke Carl Ludwig of Austria
12. Charles III, Duke of Parma
6. Robert I, Duke of Parma
13. Princess Louise of Artois
3. Princess Zita of Bourbon-Parma
14. Miguel I of Portugal
7. Infanta Maria Antónia of Portugal
15. Princess Adelaide of Löwenstein
