= Archduchess Marie-Astrid of Austria =

European royal (born 1954)

Princess Marie-Astrid
- Archduchess Marie-Astrid of Austria
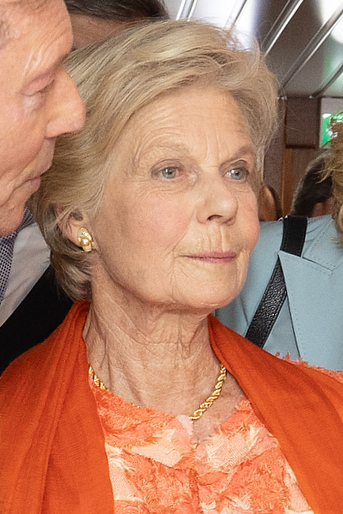
- Marie-Astrid in 2025
- Born: 17 February 1954 (age 72); Castle Betzdorf, Betzdorf, Luxembourg
- Spouse: Archduke Carl Christian of Austria (m. 1982)
- Issue: Marie Christine, Countess Rodolphe of Limburg-Stirum; Archduke Imre; Archduke Christoph; Archduke Alexander; Gabriella, Princess Henri of Bourbon-Parma
Names
- Marie-Astrid Liliane Charlotte Léopoldine Wilhelmine Ingeborg Antoinette Élisabeth Anne Alberte
- House: Nassau-Weilburg (official); Bourbon-Parma (agnatic)
- Father: Jean, Grand Duke of Luxembourg
- Mother: Princess Joséphine-Charlotte of Belgium

Archduchess Marie-Astrid of Austria (born Princess Marie-Astrid of Luxembourg on 17 February 1954) is the elder daughter and eldest child of Jean, Grand Duke of Luxembourg, and Princess Joséphine-Charlotte of Belgium. She is married to Archduke Carl Christian of Austria, grandson of the last Austrian Emperor, Karl I.

== Biography ==
Princess Marie-Astrid was born on 17 February 1954, in Castle Betzdorf, Betzdorf, Luxembourg. She is the eldest child of Jean, then Hereditary Grand Duke of Luxembourg, and Princess Joséphine-Charlotte of Belgium. Her godparents were King Leopold III of Belgium (her maternal grandfather) and Grand Duchess Charlotte of Luxembourg (her paternal grandmother).

The princess was named Marie-Astrid in honour of the Virgin Mary and her maternal grandmother the Queen of the Belgians, born Astrid of Sweden who died tragically in 1935. She is the niece of the Kings King Baudouin and King Albert II as well as the cousin of the current King of the Belgians King Philippe.

In her youth, as one of the few eligible princesses from European reigning houses, she was considered an ideal candidate by match makers for marriage to Charles, Prince of Wales. Media reports in the 1970s speculated about the prospects of such a marriage, the Daily Express claiming in June 1977 that the couple's engagement was imminent. (Unconfirmed media reports in the British press claimed that Pope Paul VI had prevented a marriage by refusing under Ne Temere to accept that the children of the couple could not be brought up Catholic.)

It has been since suggested that the marriage rumours were a result of efforts to detect a leaker in the Privy Council. In reality, a marriage between the British heir and the Catholic princess was unlikely, as the terms of the Act of Settlement 1701 needed to be repealed or modified.

Marie-Astrid studied in Luxembourg and also in Belgium. She received her diploma as a registered nurse in 1974, and finished her education in 1977, with a nursing certificate in tropical medicine from the Prince Leopold Institute.

She has been the president of the Red Cross for Luxembourg Youth since 1970.

== Marriage and issue ==
On 6 February 1982 in Luxembourg, she married her second cousin Archduke Carl Christian of Austria, younger son of Archduke Carl Ludwig of Austria (himself the fourth son of Emperor Charles I of Austria) and his wife Princess Yolande of Ligne, of the House of Ligne.

They have five children:

- Archduchess Marie-Christine Anne Astrid Zita Charlotte of Austria (born 31 July 1983, Brussels, Belgium). She married Count Rodolphe Christian Léopold Carl Ludwig Philippe de Limburg-Stirum (born 20 March 1979, Uccle, Brussels, Belgium) on 6 December 2008. They have three sons:
  - Count Léopold Menno Philippe Gabriel François-Xavier Marie Joseph Ghislain de Limburg-Stirum (born 19 April 2011, Buenos Aires, Argentina).
  - Count Constantin Marie Charles de Limburg-Stirum (born 25 October 2013, Buenos Aires, Argentina).
  - Count Gabriel Marie Joseph de Limburg-Stirum (born 20 October 2016, Buenos Aires, Argentina).
- Archduke Imre Emanuel Simeon Jean Carl Marcus d'Aviano of Austria (born 8 December 1985, Geneva, Switzerland). He married Kathleen Elizabeth Walker (born 17 April 1986), daughter of a Fifth Third Bank executive, on 8 September 2012. They have six children:
  - Archduchess Maria-Stella Elizabeth Christiana Yolande Alberta of Austria (born 11 November 2013, Kirchberg, Luxembourg).
  - Archduchess Magdalena Maria Alexandra Zita Charlotte of Austria (born 24 February 2016, Kirchberg, Luxembourg). She was baptized on 28 April 2016.
  - Archduchess Juliana Marie Christine Wilhelmina Margaret Astrid of Austria (born 14 October 2018, Geneva, Switzerland).
  - Archduchess Cecilia Marie Josephine Adelaide Henrietta of Austria (born 15 January 2021, Geneva, Switzerland).
  - Archduke Karl Maria Thomas Rafael Christian Robert Marcus d’Aviano of Austria (born 4 June 2023). He was baptized on 10 June 2023.
  - Archduke Benedikt Maria Gabriel Rodolphe Jean Charles Marcus d'Aviano of Austria (born 29 April 2026).
- Archduke Christoph Henri Alexander Maria Marcus d'Aviano of Austria (born 2 February 1988, Geneva, Switzerland). He got engaged to Adélaïde Marie Béatrice Drapé-Frisch (born 4 September 1989, Les Lilas, Paris, France), daughter of a diplomat, on 22 December 2011. They married civilly on 28 December 2012 and in a religious ceremony on 29 December 2012. They have five children:
  - Archduchess Katarina Marie-Christine Fabiola of Austria (born 22 December 2014, Geneva, Switzerland).
  - Archduchess Sophia Marie Therese of Austria (born 23 August 2017, Geneva, Switzerland).
  - Archduke Josef Carl Maria Immaculata of Austria (born 18 December 2020, Geneva, Switzerland).
  - Archduchess Flavia Marie Therese of Austria (born 15 January 2023)
  - Archduke Amedeo of Austria (born December 2024)
- Archduke Alexander Hector Marie Karl Leopold Marcus d'Aviano of Austria (born 26 September 1990, Meyrin, Switzerland). He married Natacha Roumiantzeff-Pachkevitch on 30 September 2023, in Beloeil, Belgium. They separated in 2024, and divorced in 2025.
- Archduchess Gabriella Maria Pilar Yolande Joséphine-Charlotte of Austria (born 26 March 1994, Geneva, Switzerland). She married Prince Henri Luitpold Antoine Victor Marie Joseph of Bourbon-Parma (born 14 October 1991, Roskilde, Denmark) on 12 September 2020 at Tratzberg Castle, Jenbach, Tyrol, Austria. They have three daughters:
  - Princess Victoria Antonia Marie-Astrid Lydia of Bourbon-Parma (born 30 October 2017, Geneva, Switzerland).
  - Princess Anastasia Erika Alexandra Marie Yolande of Bourbon-Parma (born 3 July 2021, Geneva, Switzerland).
  - Princess Philippine Alexandra Marie-Gabrielle Immaculata of Bourbon-Parma (born 8 December 2022)

== Honours ==
=== National ===
As Princess of Luxembourg, at 18 years old :

- Knight Grand Cross of Order of Adolphe of Nassau (by birth, on 18 years old)
- Recipient of the Commemorative Silver Jubilee Medal of His Royal Highness The Grand Duke Jean (12 November 1989).
- (Austrian Empire) House of Habsburg: Dame, 1st Class of the Order of the Starry Cross

=== Foreign ===
- Iran : Commemorative Medal of the 2500th Anniversary of the founding of the Persian Empire (14 October 1971).
- Sovereign Military Order of Malta: Knight of Honour and Devotion of the Order of Saint John
- Spain: Dame Grand Cross of the Order of Isabella the Catholic (8 July 1980).
