= Baudouin, Prince of Ligne =

Prince of Ligne

Baudouin
- Prince de Ligne

12th Prince of Ligne Prince of the Holy Roman Empire
- Tenure: 26 June 1960 – 3 March 1985
- Predecessor: Eugène, 11th Prince of Ligne
- Successor: Antoine, 13th Prince of Ligne
- Full name: Baudouin Marie Lamoral de Ligne
- Born: 27 November 1918; Paris, France
- Died: 3 March 1985 (aged 66); Château de Belœil, Belœil, Belgium
- Noble family: House of Ligne
- Spouse: Countess Monique de Bousies
- Father: Eugène, 11th Prince of Ligne
- Mother: Philippine de Noailles

Baudouin de Ligne, 12th Prince of Ligne, GE (Baudouin Marie Lamoral de Ligne, Prince de Ligne et du Saint-Empire, Prince d'Amblise et d'Epinoy, Grand d'Espagne; 1918–1985) was the head of the princely House of Ligne.

Prince Baudouin was the elder son of Eugène II, 11th prince de Ligne, and his wife, Philippine de Noailles. He had a younger brother, Antoine, and two sisters (Isabelle and Yolande).

Upon the death of his father, he became the head of one of the most prestigious Belgian noble families. Following his death in 1985 without descent, his brother Antoine succeeded him as 13th Prince of Ligne and of the Holy Roman Empire.

== Ancestry ==
Ancestors of Baudouin, Prince of Ligne

16. Eugène, 8th Prince of Ligne
8. Prince Henri Maximilien of Ligne
17. Mélanie de Conflans
4. Ernest, 10th Prince of Ligne
18. Count Ernest de Talleyrand-Périgord
9. Marguerite de Talleyrand-Périgord
19. Marie Louise Lepelletier de Morfontaine
2. Eugène, 11th Prince of Ligne
20. Timoléon de Cossé, Duc de Brissac
10. Roland de Cossé, Marquis de Brissac
21. Marguerite Le Lievre de La Grange
5. Diane de Cossé-Brissac
22. Constant André Say
11. Jeanne Marie Say
23. Jeanne Marie Emilie Wey
1. Baudouin, 12th Prince of Ligne
24. Charles Philippe Henri de Noailles
12. Antonin-Just-Léon-Marie de Noailles
25. Anne Marie Cécile de Noailles
6. François Joseph Eugène Napoléon de Noailles
26. Prince Napoleon Lucien Charles Murat
13. Princess Anne Murat
27. Caroline Georgina Fraser
3. Philippine de Noailles
28. Ernest Dubois, Vicomte de Courval
14. Arthur Constant, 3rd Baron Dubois de Courval
29. Isabelle Moreau
7. Madeleine Dubois de Courval
30. Richard Ray
15. Mary Ray
31. Mary Rebecca Boggs

Baudouin, Prince of Ligne House of Ligne Born: 27 November 1918 Died: 3 March 1985
Belgian nobility
| Preceded by Eugène | Prince of Ligne; 1960–1985 | Succeeded by Antoine |
