= Vogelsanck Castle =

Castle in Limburg, Belgium

Coordinates: 51.0073°N 5.32055°E

- Belgium
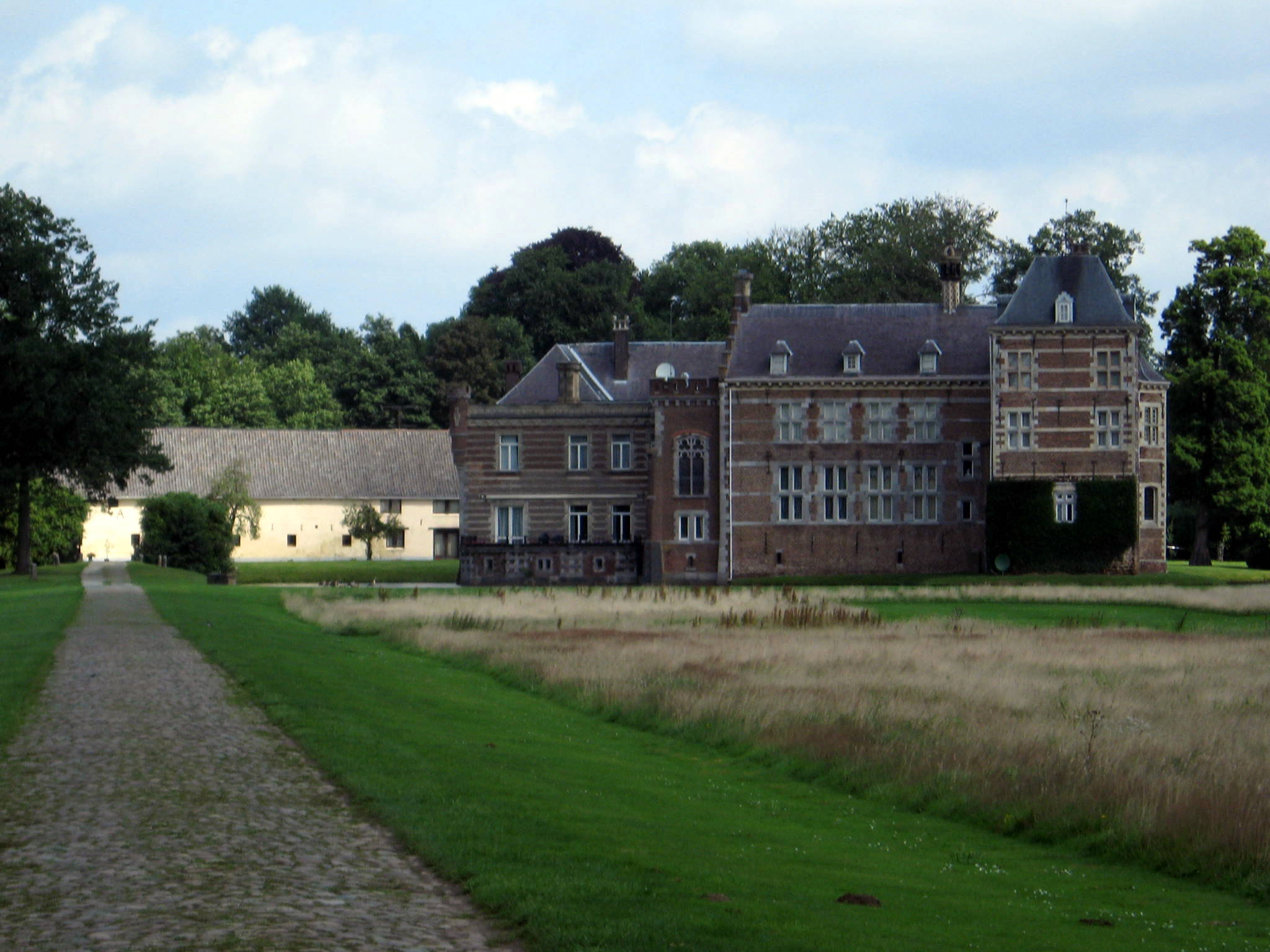

Site information
- Type: Castle

Vogelsanck Castle (Dutch: Kasteel Vogelsanck) is a moated castle in Zolder in the municipality of Heusden-Zolder, province of Limburg, Belgium.

From 1308 to 1795 the castle was the centre of government of the free territory of Vogelsanck, which comprised the present villages of Zolder, Zonhoven, Houthalen, Stokrooie and the southern part of Heusden. Since 1741 the castle has belonged to the de Villenfagnea de Vogelsanck family.

The castle is situated to the north of the N72 between Hasselt and Beringen, which cuts the estate in two.

== Sources ==
- Cops, Luc, 1991: De Heerlijkheid Vogelsanck, 250 jaar familie de Villenfagne in Zolder-Vogelsanck. VVV Heusden-Zolder
- Gids voor Vlaanderen Toeristische en culturele gids van de Vlaamse gemeenten (4th edition, 1995). VTB/VAB-Uitgeverij Lannoo: Antwerpen-Tielt

== See also ==
- List of castles in Belgium
