= Prince of Ligne =

Belgian noble title

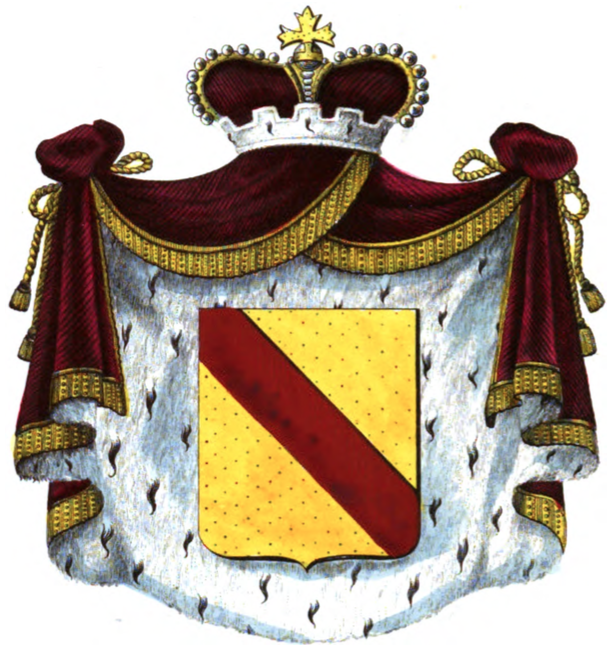
- Current region: Belgium
- Origin: Ligne in Hainaut
- Estate: Château de Belœil

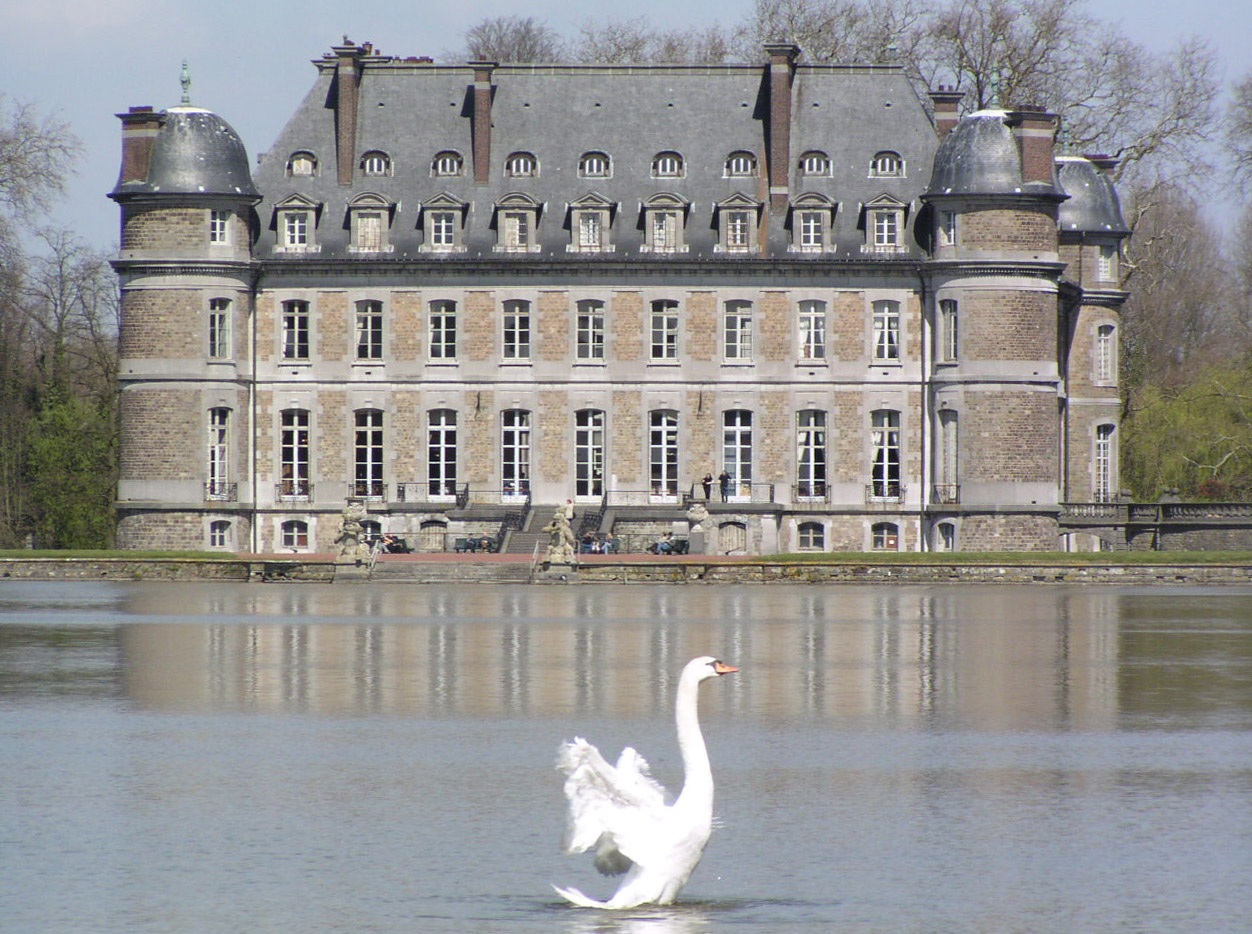
Château de Belœil

Prince of Ligne is a title of Belgian nobility that belongs to the House of Ligne, which goes back to the eleventh century. It owes its name to the village in which it originated, between Ath and Tournai. The lords of Ligne belonged to the entourage of the Count of Hainaut at the time of the Crusades.

The Ligne family began a progressive rise in the nobility, first as barons in the twelfth century, then counts of Fauquemberg and princes of Épinoy in the sixteenth century. Lamoral I received the titles of Prince of Ligne and Prince of the Holy Roman Empire in the early seventeenth century from Emperor Rudolf II. The Princes of Ligne are also Grandees of Spain, but this dignity is held personally rather than in conjunction with the title.

== Barons de Ligne ==
- Jean II, Baron of Ligne and Brabançon, Lord of Beloeil (died 1442)
  - Jean III, Baron of Ligne 1442–1469 (died 1469)
    - Jean IV, Baron of Ligne, Lord of Roubaix 1469–1491 (died 1491)
      - Antoine I, Baron of Ligne and Beloeil 1491–1532, Count of Fauquemberg, created 1st Prince de Mortagne 1513 (died 1532)
        - Jacques I, Baron of Ligne and Beloeil, Count of Fauquemberg 1532-1545 (died 1552), created 1st Count of Ligne 1545
    - Guillaume, inherited Brabançon, ancestor of Dukes of Arenberg in male line (died c.1519)

== Comtes de Ligne (1545–1601) ==
- Jacques I, 1st Count of Ligne in 1545–c. 1552, Count of Fauquemberg, Prince de Mortagne, Baron de Belœil (died c. 1552)
  - Philippe, 2nd Count of Ligne c. 1552–1583, Count of Fauquemberg, Baron de Wassenaer et de Bailleul, Vicomte de Leiden (1533–1583)
    - Lamoral, 3rd Count of Ligne in 1583–1601, created 1st Prince d'Épinoy 1592 (1563–1624), created Fürst von Ligne 1601

== Princes de Ligne (1601–present) ==
- Lamoral I, 1st Prince 1601–1624 (1563–1624)
  - Florent, Hereditary Prince, Marquis de Roubaix (1588–1622), created Prince d'Amblise 1608
    - Albert Henri, 2nd Prince 1624–1641 (1615–1641)
    - Claude Lamoral I, 3rd Prince 1641–1679 (1618–1679)
      - Henri I Louis Ernest, 4th Prince 1679–1702 (1644–1702)
        - Antoine II Joseph Ghislain, 5th Prince 1702–1750 (1682–1750)
        - Claude Lamoral II, 6th Prince 1750–1766 (1685–1766)
          - Charles-Joseph, 7th Prince 1766–1814 (1735–1814)
            - Charles Antoine Joseph Emanuel, Hereditary Prince (1759–1792)
            - Louis Eugene Marie Lamoral, Hereditary Prince (1766–1813)
              - Eugène I, 8th Prince 1814–1880 (1804–1880)
                - Henri Maximilien Joseph Charles Louis Lamoral, Hereditary Prince (1824–1871)
                  - Louis, 9th Prince 1880–1918 (1854–1918)
                  - Ernest, 10th Prince 1918–1937 (1857–1937), great-grandfather of Stéphanie, Grand Duchess of Luxembourg
                    - Eugène II, 11th Prince 1937–1960 (1893–1960)
                      - Baudouin, 12th Prince 1960–1985 (1918–1985)
                      - Antoine III, 13th Prince of Ligne 1985–2005 (1925–2005)
                        - Michel IV, 14th Prince of Ligne 2005–present (born 1951)
                          - Henri II Antoine, Hereditary Prince (born 1989)
                        - Prince Wauthier Philippe of Ligne (1952-2022)
                          - Prince Philippe Michel of Ligne (born 1977)
                            - Prince Jean-Charles of Ligne (born 2010)
                        - Prince Antoine Lamoral of Ligne (born 1959)
                          - Prince Louis of Ligne (born 2003)
                - Prince Charles Joseph Eugene Henri Georges Lamoral of Ligne (1837–1914)
                  - Prince Henri Florent Lamoral of Ligne (1881–1967)
                    - Prince Jean Charles of Ligne-La Trémoïlle (1911–2005)
                      - Prince Charles-Antoine Lamoral of Ligne-La Trémoïlle (born 1946)
                        - Prince Edouard Lamoral Rodolphe of Ligne-La Trémoïlle (born 1976)
                          - Prince Antoine Tau Édouard Adrien of Ligne-La Trémoille (born 2019)
                        - Prince Charles Lamoral Joseph Malcolm of Ligne-La Trémoïlle (born 1980)
                          - Prince Amadeo Joseph Gabriel of Ligne-La Trémoïlle (born 2012)

== Knights of the Golden Fleece ==
Many of the Princes de Ligne have also been knights of the Order of the Golden Fleece. The following list is of those princes, along with their year of investiture:

- 1599 - Lamoral, 1st Prince of Ligne
- 1646 - Claude-Lamoral, 3rd Prince of Ligne
- 1684 - Henri, 4th Prince of Ligne
- 1721 - Claude Lamoral, 6th Prince of Ligne
- 1772 - Charles-Joseph, 7th Prince of Ligne
- 1846 - Eugène, 8th Prince of Ligne
- 1930 - Ernest, 10th Prince of Ligne
- 1954 - Eugène, 11th Prince of Ligne
- 1960 - Baudouin, 12th Prince of Ligne
- 1985 - Antoine, 13th Prince of Ligne
- 2011 - Michel, 14th Prince of Linge
