= Prince Eugène de Ligne =

Eugène
- Prince de Ligne
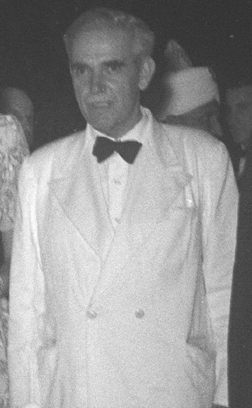
- Pictured in October 1947

11th Prince of Ligne
- Tenure: 23 June 1937 – 26 June 1960
- Predecessor: Ernest, 10th Prince of Ligne
- Successor: Baudouin, 12th Prince of Ligne
- Full name: Eugène Frédéric Marie Lamoral de Ligne
- Born: 10 August 1893; Breuilpont, France
- Died: 26 June 1960 (aged 66); Château de Belœil, Belœil, Belgium
- Noble family: House of Ligne
- Spouse: Philippine de Noailles (m. 1917)
- Issue: Baudouin, 12th Prince of Ligne; Princess Isabelle; Archduchess Yolande of Austria; Antoine, 13th Prince of Ligne
- Father: Ernest, 10th Prince of Ligne
- Mother: Diane de Cossé-Brissac

Eugène de Ligne, 11th Prince of Ligne (Eugène Frédéric Marie Lamoral, prince de Ligne; 10 August 1893 – 26 June 1960) was a Belgian ambassador and the eldest son of Ernest, 10th Prince of Ligne, and his wife, Diane de Cossé-Brissac. He also held the titles of Prince of Épinoy and Prince of Amblise and was a Knight of the Golden Fleece.

== Biography ==
After having carried out studies of philosophy and letters, Eugène completed in 1920 the diplomatic examination with distinction. He was sent to Bucharest, Paris, Madrid, London and Washington, D.C.

Eugène married Philippine de Noailles on 28 February 1917. She was a daughter of François Joseph de Noailles, Prince de Poix. They had two sons and two daughters:

1. Baudouin, 12th Prince of Ligne (1918–1985)
2. Princess Isabelle of Ligne (1921–2000)
3. Princess Yolande of Ligne (1923–2023), who married Archduke Carl Ludwig of Austria
4. Antoine, 13th Prince of Ligne (1925–2005)

Following the death of his father in 1937, Eugène became the 11th prince of Ligne. During the invasion of Belgium by the Germans in 1940, Eugène joined (near Antwerp) the motorized group at the vanguard. When Belgium was demobilized, he and his wife worked to provision the country and transformed the castle of Belœil into a hiding place for hundreds of Jewish children escaping the Holocaust, for which he and his wife received the honor of Righteous Among the Nations.

After the Second World War, he was named ambassador of Belgium to India (1947 to 1951), then to Spain (1951 to 1958).

== Honours ==
- Knight of the Order of the Golden Fleece
- 1931: commander in the Royal Order of the Lion

Prince Eugène de Ligne House of Ligne Born: 10 August 1893 Died: 26 June 1960
Belgian nobility
Preceded by Ernest	Prince of Ligne; 1937–1960	Succeeded by Baudouin
