= Charles-Joseph, 7th Prince of Ligne =

Habsburg Austrian field marshal, writer and intellectual (1735–1814)

Charles-Joseph
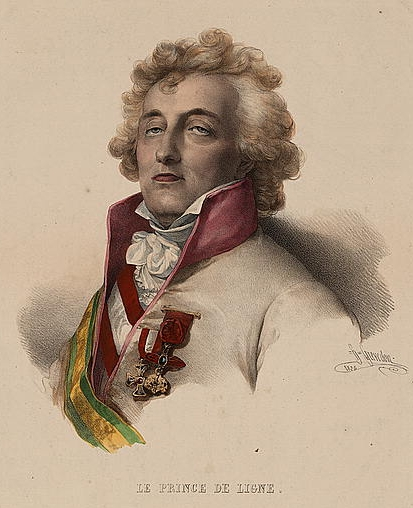

Prince de Ligne
- Reign: 7 April 1766 – 13 December 1814
- Predecessor: Claude Lamoral
- Successor: Eugène
- Born: 23 May 1735; Brussels, Austrian Netherlands
- Died: 13 December 1814 (aged 79); Vienna, Austrian Empire
- Spouse: Princess Franziska of Liechtenstein
- Issue: Marie-Christine, Princess von Clary und Aldringen; Prince Charles-Joseph Antoine; Prince François Léopold; Prince Louis-Eugène; Prince Adalbert Xavier; Euphémie Christine, Countess Pálffy ab Erdöd; Flore, Baroness Spiegel
Names
- Charles-Joseph Lamoral François Alexis de Ligne
- House: House of Ligne
- Father: Claude Lamoral, 6th Prince de Ligne
- Mother: Princess Elisabeth Alexandrine zu Salm

Charles-Joseph Lamoral, 7th Prince de Ligne (in German Karl-Joseph Lamoral 7. Fürst von Ligne, also known as Karl Fürst von Ligne or Fürst de Ligne; 23 May 1735 – 13 December 1814) was a field marshal of the Army of the Holy Roman Empire, inhaber of an infantry regiment, prolific writer, intellectual, and member of the Belgian princely family of Ligne.

He fought as a field officer during several famous battles during the Seven Years' War and briefly returned to military duty in the War of the Bavarian Succession. He performed an important diplomatic mission to Catherine the Great in 1787 and led troops against the Turks at Belgrade in 1789. Beginning in the 1770s, he authored an impressive volume of work. After his estates in the Austrian Netherlands were lost to France during the War of the First Coalition, he lived in Vienna. All three of his sons died before him, but his wife and four daughters all outlived him. His grandson, the 8th Prince, became a Belgian statesman.

== Military service ==
Prince Charles-Joseph de Ligne was born in Brussels, Austrian Netherlands, the son of Field Marshal Claude Lamoral, 6th Prince of Ligne and Princess Elisabeth Alexandrina zu Salm, daughter of Ludwig Otto, 5th Prince zu Salm and his wife Princess Albertine of Nassau-Hadamar.

As an Austrian subject he entered the imperial army at an early age. He distinguished himself by his valor in the Seven Years' War, notably at Breslau, Leuthen, Hochkirch and Maxen. A young captain at Leuthen, he found himself suddenly in command of 200 men, the battalion colonels and majors having been killed, and led them to shelter from Prussian cannon fire beside a windmill; subsequently, he participated in the retreat to Königsburg.

During the Seven Years' War, de Ligne was promoted major in 1757, Oberstleutnant in 1758, and Oberst (colonel) in 1759. He was named general-major on 23 April 1764 and Feldmarschall-Leutnant on 1 May 1773. He was awarded the Order of the Golden Fleece in 1772. He was appointed Inhaber (proprietor) of Infantry Regiment Nr. 30 in 1771, the successor to Prince William Carl Christian of Saxe-Gotha-Altenburg.

He became the friend and counselor of Emperor Joseph II, and, inheriting his father's large estates, lived in luxury until the War of the Bavarian Succession brought him again into active service.

In 1778, de Ligne was impressed by a captured Prussian officer Flemming von Hagen, who was asked about his girl friends by his captors and replied, "I love nothing more dearly than my sword". He wished that more Austrian officers were as serious about their military profession. King Frederick the Great of Prussia built a number of palaces and other buildings in Potsdam, but upon closer inspection, the place had a seedy appearance. de Ligne wrote that Frederick had a chance to do something new in Potsdam, but "he believed that he could bend Nature to his will by the force of his intellect, in the same way as he attained his victories, and managed war, politics, population, finances and industries. But Nature has a way of laughing at heroes. She prefers a Somerset farmer".

This war was short and uneventful, and the prince then traveled in England, Germany, Italy, Switzerland and France, devoting himself impartially to the courts, the camps, the salons and the learned assemblies of philosophers and scientists in each country. He developed a great admiration for Frederick the Great, even to the point of justifying his seizure of Silesia.

De Ligne was promoted to Feldzeugmeister (full general) on 8 September 1787. He earned the Commander's Cross of the Order of Maria Theresa on 12 October 1789.

In 1787 he was with Catherine II in Russia and accompanied her in her journey to the Crimea. In 1789 he was present at the Siege of Belgrade.

Shortly after the siege of Belgrade, he was invited to place himself at the head of the Belgian revolutionary movement, in which one of his sons and many of his relatives were prominent, but declined with great courtesy, saying that "he never revolted in the winter." Though suspected by Joseph of collusion with the rebels, the two friends were not long estranged, and after the death of the emperor the prince remained in Vienna.

He was appointed Grand Bailiff of Hainaut in 1791. After entering diplomacy, his sympathy for the Belgian rebels closed the door to him. During the annexation by France in 1792, his property was confiscated. He never saw his Château de Beloeil again, which was sequestered, and settled permanently in Vienne in 1792.

His Brabant estates were overrun by the French in 1792–93, and his eldest son killed in action at La Croix-du Bois in the Argonne (14 September 1792). He was given an honorary command at court.

== Later life ==
De Ligne served as captain of the Trabanten Life Guard (Gentlemen at Arms) and the Hofburgwache (Palace Bodyguard) from 13 June 1807 until his death. He received promotion to Feldmarschall on 6 September 1808. Despite the loss of his estates, Charles-Joseph lived in comparative luxury in his later life, and devoted himself to his literary work. He lived long enough to characterize the proceedings of the Congress of Vienna with the famous mot: "Le Congrès ne marche pas, il danse." (The Congress does not march, it dances.) He died, aged 79, in Vienna in December 1814 and was buried at the Kahlenberg cemetery. In 1815, the proprietorship of Infantry Regiment Nr. 30 passed to Laval Nugent von Westmeath.

== Collected works ==
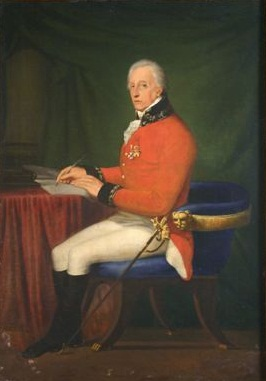
Charles-Joseph de Ligne, c. 1807

His collected works appeared in thirty-four volumes at Vienna during the last years of his life (Mélanges militaires, littéraires, sentimentaires), and he bequeathed his manuscripts to the emperor's Trabant Guard, of which he was captain (Œuvres posthumes, Dresden and Vienna, 1817). Selections were published in French, German and English:

- Œuvres choisies de M. le prince de Ligne (Paris, 1809)
- Lettres et pensées du Maréchal Prince de Ligne, ed. by Madame de Staël-Holstein (1809)
- Œuvres historiques, littéraires ... correspondance et poésies diverses (Brussels, 1859)
- Des Prinzen Karl von Ligne militärische Werke, ed. Count Pappenheim (Sulzbach, 1814)
- Memoir of Charles-Joseph, Prince de Ligne, ed. Katharine Prescott Wormeley (Boston, 1902)

The most important of his numerous works on all military subjects is the Fantaisies et préjuge's militaires, which originally appeared in 1780. A modern edition is that published by J Dumaine (Paris, 1879). A German version (Miltarische Vorurtheile und Phantasien, etc.) appeared as early as 1783. This work, though it deals lightly and cavalierly with the most important subjects (the prince even proposes to found an international academy of the art of war, wherein the reputation of generals could be impartially weighed), is a military classic, and indispensable to the students of the post-Frederician period. On the whole, it may be said that the prince adhered to the school of Guibert, and a full discussion will be found in Max Jahns' Gesch. d. Kriegswissenschaften. Another very celebrated work by the prince is the mock autobiography of Prince Eugène of Savoy (1809).

Other works of his include:

- Lettres à Eugénie sur les spectacles (1774)
- Céphalide, ou les Autres mariages samnites, comédie en musique (1777)
- Préjugés et Fantaisies militaires (1780)
- Colette et Lucas, comédie en musique (1781)
- Coup d'œil sur Belœil (1781)
- Fantaisies militaires (1783)
- L'Amant ridicule, proverbe en prose (1787)
- Mélanges militaires, littéraires et sentimentaires (1795–1811)
- Mémoires sur les Juifs (1795–1811)
- Les Embarras, pièce en un acte (manuscrit)
- Contes immoraux

== Marriage and issue ==
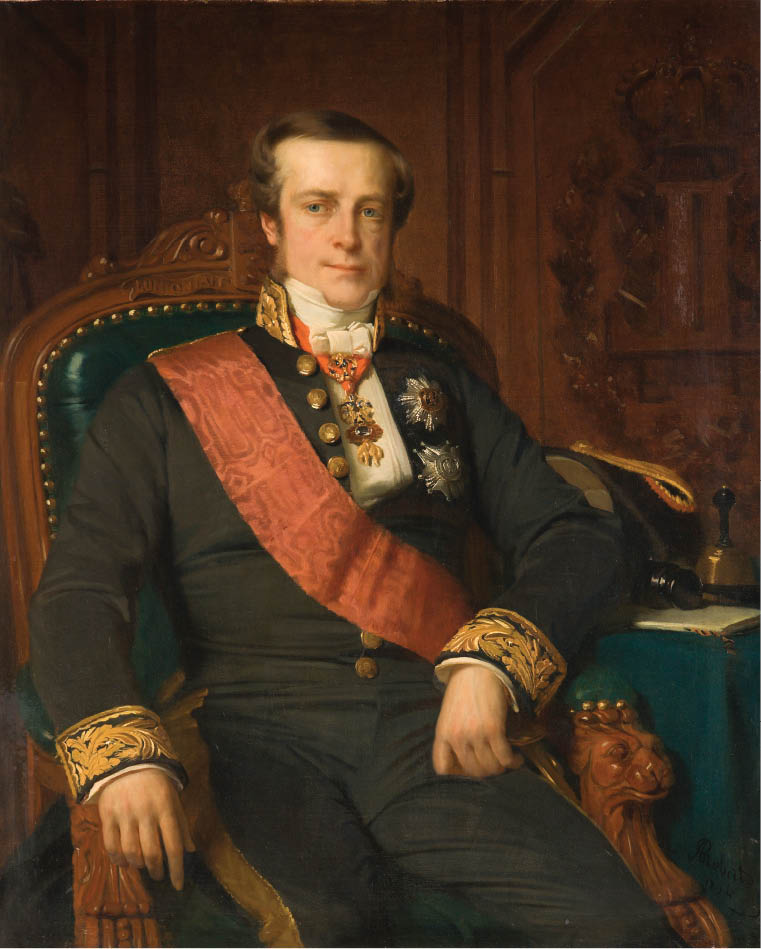
Eugene, 8th Prince of Ligne, grandson

On 6 August 1755, in Valtice or Feldsberg, Charles-Joseph married Princess Franziska Xaveria Maria of Liechtenstein (Vienna, 27 November 1739 – Vienna, 17 May 1821), sister of Franz Joseph I, Prince of Liechtenstein. The couple had seven children.

- Princess Marie Christine Leopoldine (25 May 1757 Brussels – 13 September 1830 Teplice)
- Prince Charles Antoine Joseph Emanuel (25 September 1759 Brussels – 14 September 1792)
- Prince Francois Leopold (3 November 1764 – 6 January 1771)
- Prince Louis Eugene Marie Lamoral (7 May 1766 Brussels – 10 May 1813 Brussels)
- Prince Adalbert Xavier (26 August 1767 – 23 May 1771)
- Princess Euphemie Christine Philippine (18 July 1773 Brussels – 30 March 1834 Vienna)
- Princess Flore Adelaide Caroline (8 November 1775 Brussels – 9 December 1851 Vienna)

He also had two illegitimate daughters: "Adèle" (1809–1810) by Adelaide Fleury; and another one (?) (1770–1770) by Angélique d'Hannetaire (1749–1822). Charles-Joseph legitimated in 1810 the illegitimate beloved daughter of his son Charles, called "Fanny-Christine" (4 January 1788 – 19 May 1867). She is called "Titine" in the diaries and letters of the family; she married Maurice O'Donnell von Tyrconnell (1780–1843).

His grandson, Eugène, 8th Prince de Ligne (1804–1880), was a distinguished Belgian statesman, and another grandson, Count Maximilian O'Donnell von Tyrconnell (1812–1895), helped save the life of Emperor Franz Josef I of Austria in Vienna in 1853.

== Ancestry ==
Ancestors of Charles-Joseph, 7th Prince of Ligne

8. Claude Lamoral, 3rd Prince de Ligne
4. Henri, 4th Prince de Ligne
9. Countess Claire-Marie of Nassau-Siegen
2. Claude Lamoral, 6th Prince de Ligne
10. Luis de Aragón y Fernández de Córdoba, 6th Duke de Segorbe
5. Juana Monica de Aragon y Benavides de Cordona y de Cordoba
11. María Teresa de Benavídes Dávila y Corella
1. Charles-Joseph, 7th Prince de Ligne
12. Charles Theodore, Prince of Salm
6. Louis Otto, Prince of Salm
13. Countess Palatine Louise Maria of Simmern
3. Princess Elisabeth Alexandrine of Salm
14. Maurice Henry, Prince of Nassau-Hadamar
7. Princess Albertine Johanna of Nassau-Hadamar
15. Countess Anna Louise of Manderscheid-Blankenheim

== See also ==
- Prince of Ligne
- Château de Belœil
- Edelstetten Abbey

== Notes ==
See Revue de Bruxelles (October 1839); Reiffenberg, "Le Feld. maréchal Prince Charles Joseph de Ligne," Mémoires de l'académie de Bruxelles, vol. xix.; Peetermans, Le Prince de Ligne, ou un écrivain grand seigneur (Liege, 1857), Etudes et notices historique concernant l'histoire des Pays Bas, vol. iii. (Brussels, 1890)

Charles-Joseph, 7th Prince of Ligne House of Ligne Born: 23 May 1735 Died: 13 December 1814
Regnal titles
Preceded by Claude Lamoral	Prince of Ligne; 1766–1814	Succeeded by Eugène
Military offices
Preceded by Prince William of Saxe-Gotha-Altenburg	Proprietor (Inhaber) of Infantry Regiment Nr. 30; 1771–1814	Succeeded by Laval Nugent von Westmeath
