= Marquisate of Casa Real =

Marquisate of Casa Real (Spanish: Marqués de Casa Real) is a title of the Spanish nobility.

The title was granted on 8 November 1760 to the existing viscount of San Jerónimo to Francisco García de Huidobro, Life-Treasurer of the Royal Mint of Santiago de Chile and Knight of Santiago.

Vicenta Márquez de la Plata y Ferrándiz received the title in 2008 after the death of his father, José María Márquez de la Plata y Caamaño.
