= House of Ligne =

Belgian noble family

- Current region: Belgium
- Origin: Ligne in Hainaut
- Founded: 11th century
- Current head: Michel, 14th Prince of Ligne
- Titles: Prince de Ligne; Prince d'Épinoy; Prince d'Amblise
- Estate: Château de Belœil
- Cadet branches: Ligne-La Trémoïlle

The House of Ligne (French: Maison de Ligne) is one of the oldest Belgian noble families, dating back to the 11th century. The family's name comes from the village of Ligne where it originated, between Ath and Tournai in what is now the Hainaut province of Belgium.

== History ==
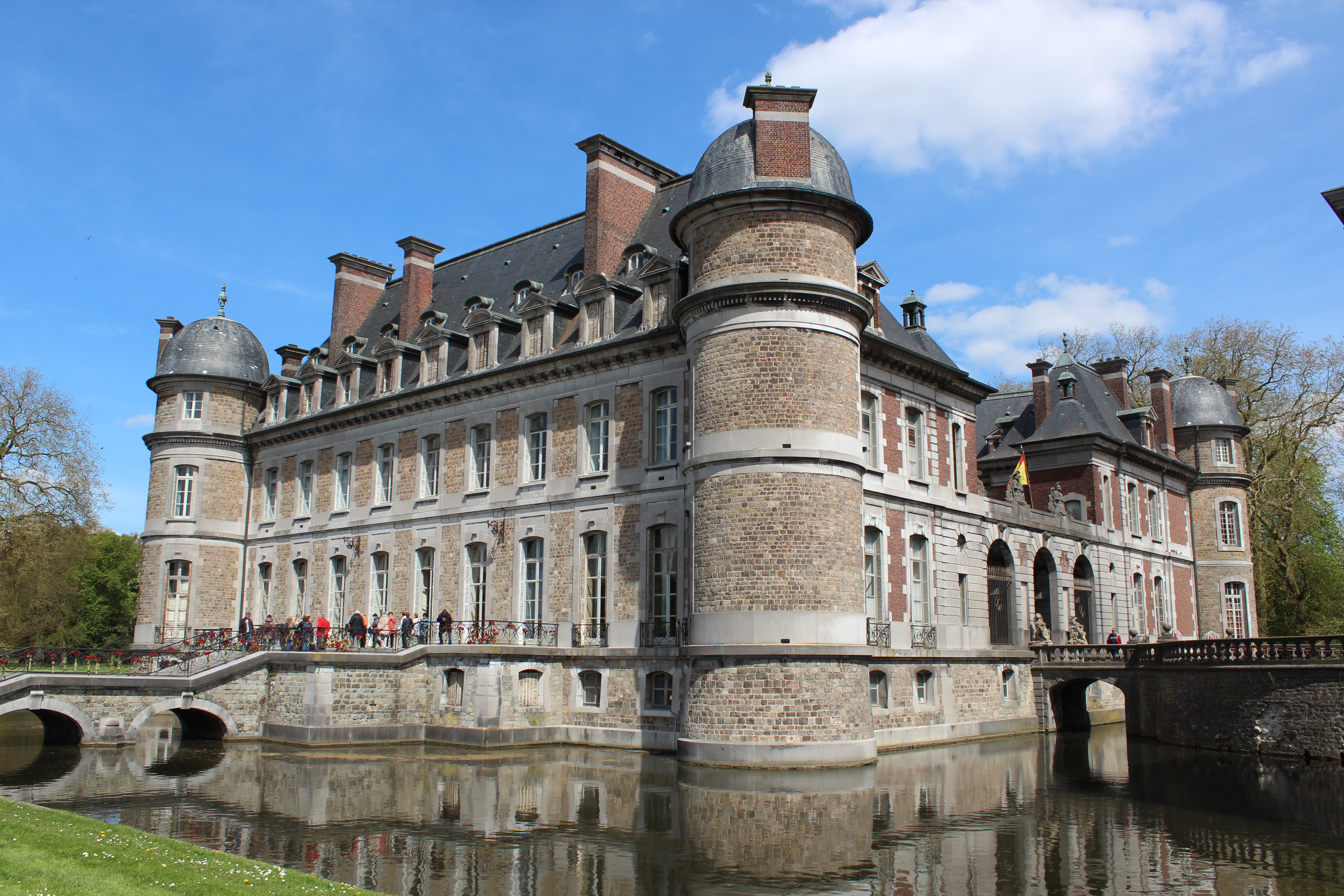
Château de Belœil

Their progressive rise in the nobility began as barons in the twelfth century, counts of Fauquemberg and princes of Épinoy in the sixteenth century, then princes of Amblise in 1608. The family became Imperial counts on 18 December 1544, then Lamoral I received from Emperor Rudolf II the title of Prince of the Holy Roman Empire as Prince de Ligne on 20 March 1601, for all of his agnatic descendants, both male and female.

Compensation for loss of the Imperial County of Ligne (Fagnolles, since that barony had become seat of the county in 1789) as a result of the Peace of Lunéville consisted of substitution of the secularized Imperial abbey of Edelstetten, with an individual vote guaranteed in the Imperial College of Princes in 1803. That principality was, however, sold to Prince Nikolaus Esterházy on 22 May 1804, before the abolition of the Holy Roman Empire, of which Edelstetten had been a constituent Imperial state, in 1806.

The style of Highness was confirmed for all members of extant branches of the family on 31 May 1923, and the titles of Prince d'Amblise and Prince d'Epinoy recognized for the head of the house on 22 October of the same year by the Belgian Crown.

There have been cadet branches of this house: Barbançon, Barbançon-Arenberg, Moÿ, Ham and Arenberg, La Trémoïlle.

== Abbots and abbesses ==
Within this family, there were the following abbots and abbesses:

- Gérard de Ligne (†1270) Abbot de Cambrai
- Mahaut de Ligne (c. 1275) Abbess d'Epinlieu
- Marie de Ligne (c. 1500) Abbess de Mons
- Marie de Ligne (c. 1550) Abbess de Cambrai
- Catherine de Ligne (†1581) Abbess de Thorn (La Thure)

== Princes de Ligne ==
- Lamoral, 1st Prince de Ligne (of the Holy Roman Empire) 1601–1624 (1563–1624)
  - Florent de Ligne, 1st Prince d'Amblise 1608–1622 (1588–1622)
    - Albert Henri, 2nd Prince 1624–1641 (1615–1641)
    - Claude Lamoral, 3rd Prince 1641–1679 (1618–1679)
      - Henri Louis Ernest, 4th Prince 1679–1702 (1644–1702)
        - Antoine Joseph Ghislain, 5th Prince 1702–1750 (1682–1750)
        - Claude Lamoral, 6th Prince 1750–1766 (1685–1766)
          - Charles-Joseph, 7th Prince 1766–1814 (1735–1814)
            - Hereditary Prince Charles Antoine Joseph Emanuel de Ligne (1759–1792)
            - Hereditary Prince Louis-Eugene de Ligne (1766–1813)
              - Eugène, 8th Prince 1814–1880 (1804–1880)
                - Hereditary Prince Henri Maximilien de Ligne (1824–1871)
                  - Louis, 9th Prince 1880–1918 (1854–1918)
                  - Ernest, 10th Prince 1918–1937 (1857–1937)
                    - Eugène, 11th Prince 1937–1960 (1893–1960)
                      - Baudouin, 12th Prince 1960–1985 (1918–1985)
                      - Antoine, 13th Prince 1985–2005 (1925–2005)
                        - Michel, 14th Prince 2005–present (born 1951)
                          - (1) Hereditary Prince Henri Antoine (born 1989)
                        - Prince Wauthier de Ligne (1952–2022)
                          - (2) Prince Philippe de Ligne (born 1977)
                        - (3) Prince Antoine de Ligne (born 1959)
                          - (4) Prince Louis de Ligne (born 2003)
                - Prince Charles-Joseph de Ligne (1837–1914)
                  - Prince Henri Florent Lamoral of Ligne (1881–1967)
                    - Jean Charles, Prince de Ligne de La Trémoïlle (1911–2005)
                      - (5) Charles-Antoine, Prince de Ligne de La Trémoïlle (born 1946),
                        - (6) Prince Edouard Lamoral de Ligne de La Trémoïlle (born 1976)
                          - (7) Prince Antoine de Ligne-la Tremoille (born 2019)
                        - (8) Prince Charles Joseph de Ligne-La Trémoïlle (born 1980).
                          - (9) Prince Amadeo Joseph de Ligne-La Trémoïlle (born 2012)

== Other members of the family ==
Claimants to the kingdoms of Jerusalem, Cyprus, Armenia, and Naples:

- Charles-Antoine, Prince de Ligne de La Trémoïlle (1946–), third cousin once removed of Michel, 14th Prince de Ligne, see above
  - Prince Edouard Lamoral de Ligne de La Trémoïlle (1976–), heir
    - Prince Antoine de Ligne-la Tremoille (born 2019)
  - Prince Charles Joseph de Ligne-La Trémoïlle (born 1980).
    - Prince Amadeo Joseph de Ligne-La Trémoïlle (born 2012)

Princess Sophie de Ligne (born 1957), of the House of Ligne, married Philippe de Nicolaÿ (born 1955) a director of the Rothschild group, great-grandson of Salomon James de Rothschild and member of the Nicolaÿ family.

Archduchess Yolande of Austria (1923–2023), daughter of the 11th Prince of Ligne, was the daughter-in-law of Emperor Charles I of Austria.

Alix, Princess of Ligne (1929–2019), wife of the 13th Prince of Ligne was born Princess of Luxembourg as daughter of Charlotte, Grand Duchess of Luxembourg and Felix of Bourbon-Parma. Her daughter is Princess Yolande de Ligne (b.1963), daughter-in-law of Peter Townsend (RAF officer), linked romantically with Princess Margaret, Countess of Snowdon, sister of Queen Elizabeth II of the United Kingdom.

The current Prince of Ligne, Michel, is married to Princess Eleonora of Orléans-Braganza, daughter of Prince Pedro Henrique of Orléans-Braganza and Princess Maria Elisabeth of Bavaria, therefore great-granddaughter of Princess Regent Isabel of Brazil and great-great-granddaughter of Pedro II of Brazil, the last monarch of Imperial Brazil.

== Arms of the House of Ligne ==
The coat of arms of the family is blazoned as Or a bend gules.

Heraldic shield of the House of Ligne

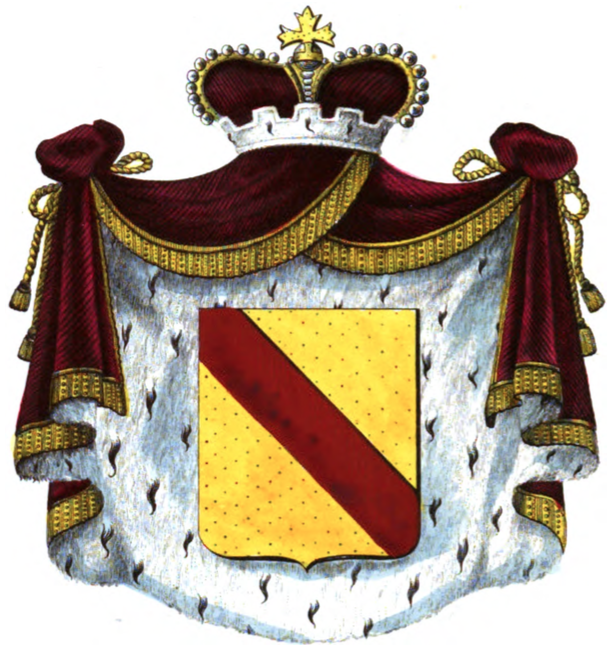
Armorial achievement with princely hat and mantle

Arms of the branch of Barbançon

Arms of the branch of Ham

Arms of the branch of Moÿ

Arms of the branch of La Trémoïlle

== See also ==
- Edelstetten Abbey
- List of noble families in Belgium
- Prince of Ligne
