= Château de Belœil =

Château in Wallonia, Belgium

- Belœil in Wallonia, Belgium
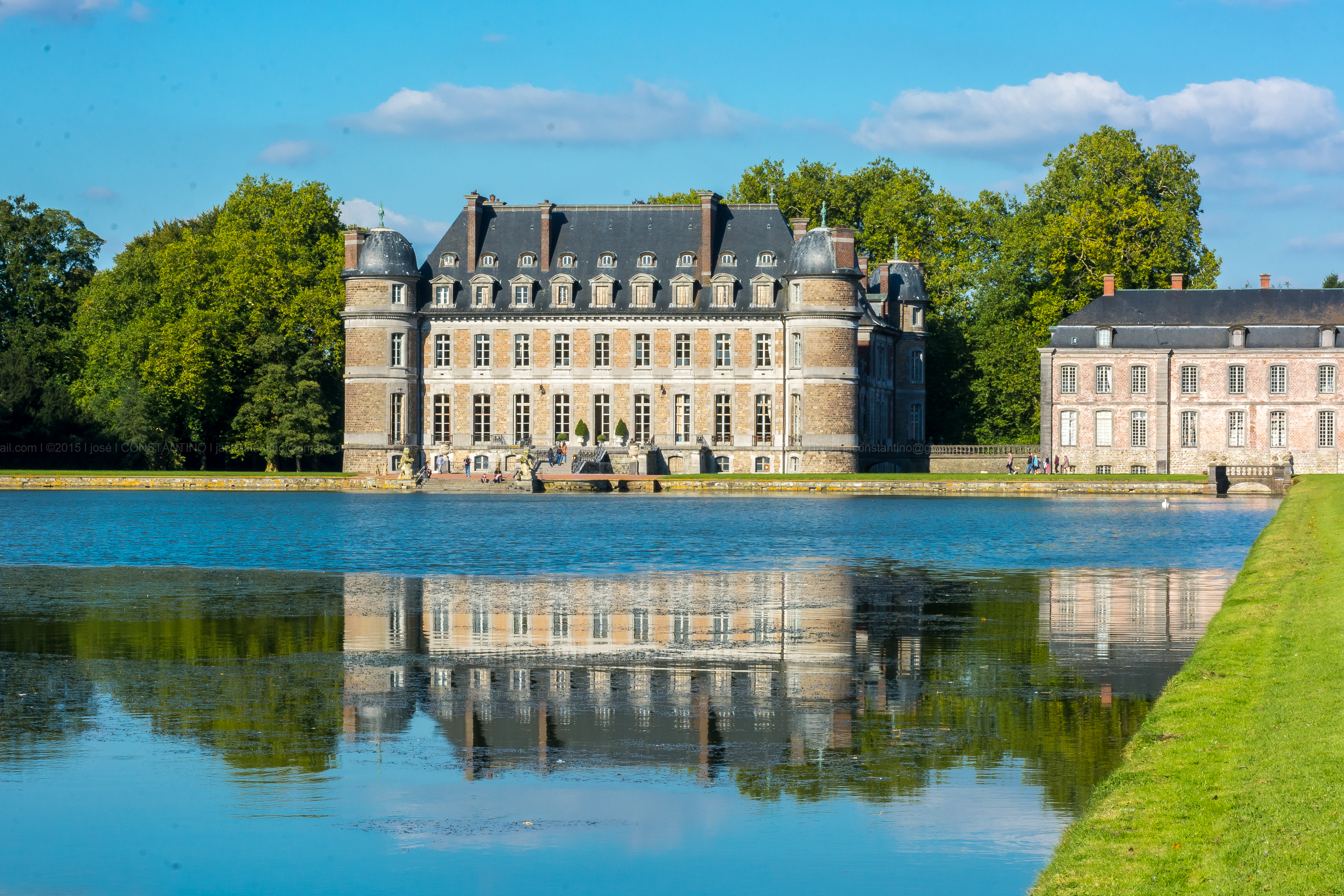
- Château de Belœil in 2015

Site information
- Owner: Ligne family
- Website: www.chateaudebeloeil.com

Location
- Coordinates: 50.5511259°N 3.7302876°E

The Château de Belœil (French pronunciation: [ʃato də bɛlœj]) is a château situated in the municipality of Belœil in the province of Hainaut, Wallonia, Belgium. It serves as the main residence of the princes of Ligne. The château lies in the middle of a Baroque garden designed in 1664. The château and gardens can be visited during spring and summer.

The château was one of the filming locations for The Royal Exchange (2017).

== History ==
Belœil became a possession of the Ligne family in 1394. At the beginning of the 15th century, the local castle was chosen as the principal residence of the family. The old castle was a fortified rectangular building with a moat surrounding it and had four round towers, one at each angle.

This basic structure is still preserved, although the facades and interiors were greatly altered during the following centuries. The fortified castle was adapted into a luxurious country house (château), following the French example. The interiors were appointed with fine furniture and the art collection of the family.

During the New Year's celebrations of 1900, disaster struck the château when it burned down completely. Most of the furnishings, including the library of 20,000 rare volumes and the art collection, were saved. The château was rebuilt in the following years by the French architect Ernest Sanson, while the interiors were redecorated using pieces from the Ligne collections.

=== Gardens ===
From 1664 onward, the park was created, with straight alleys, geometrical ponds and imposing perspectives. The typical bosquets (garden chambers enclosed by high hedges) were preserved in spite of the changing fashion in the 18th and 19th centuries, when English landscape gardens were preferred. A small landscape garden with a folly was installed in the direct vicinity of the château by Charles Joseph, Prince de Ligne.

== Gallery ==
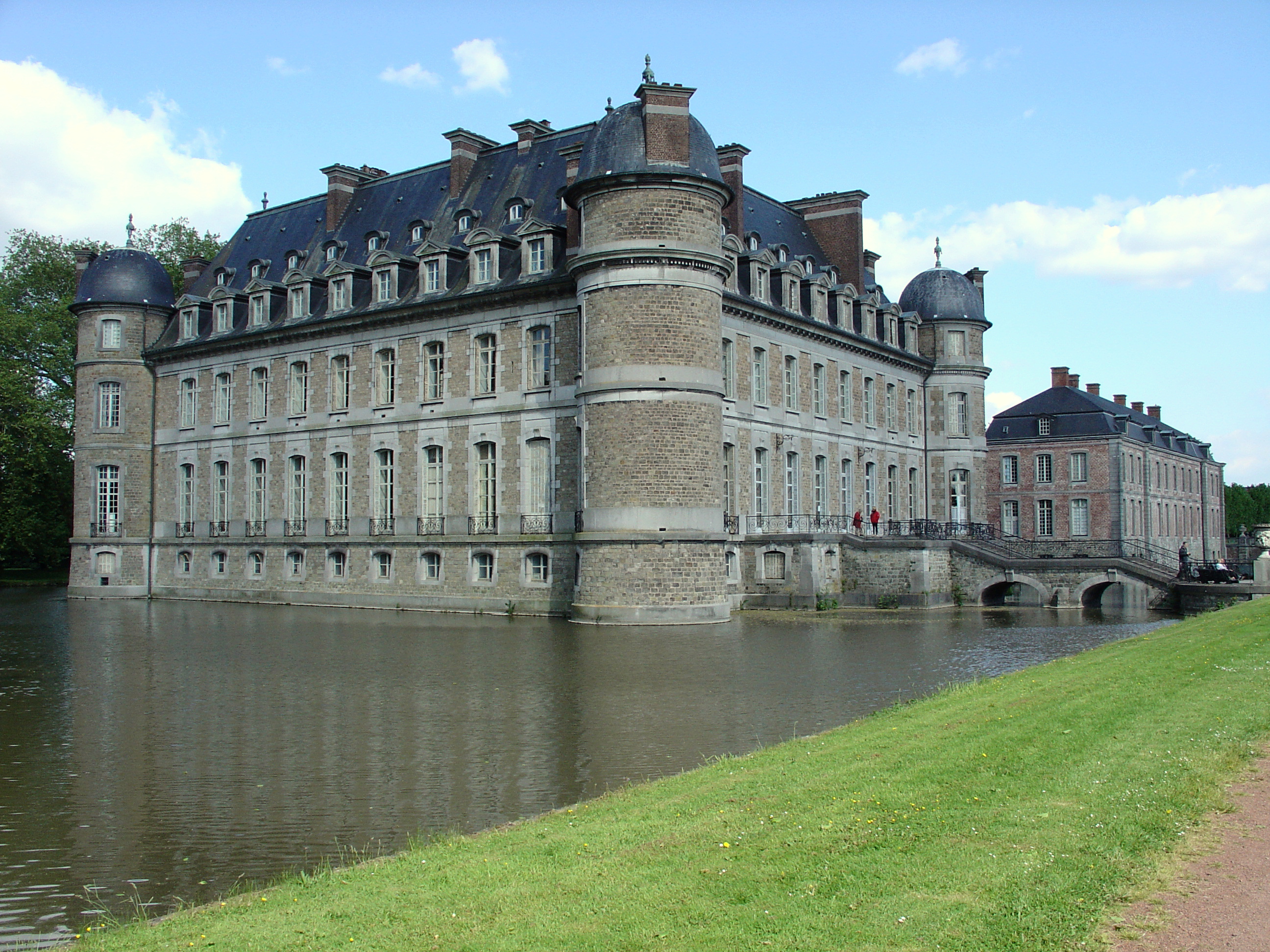
Château de Belœil

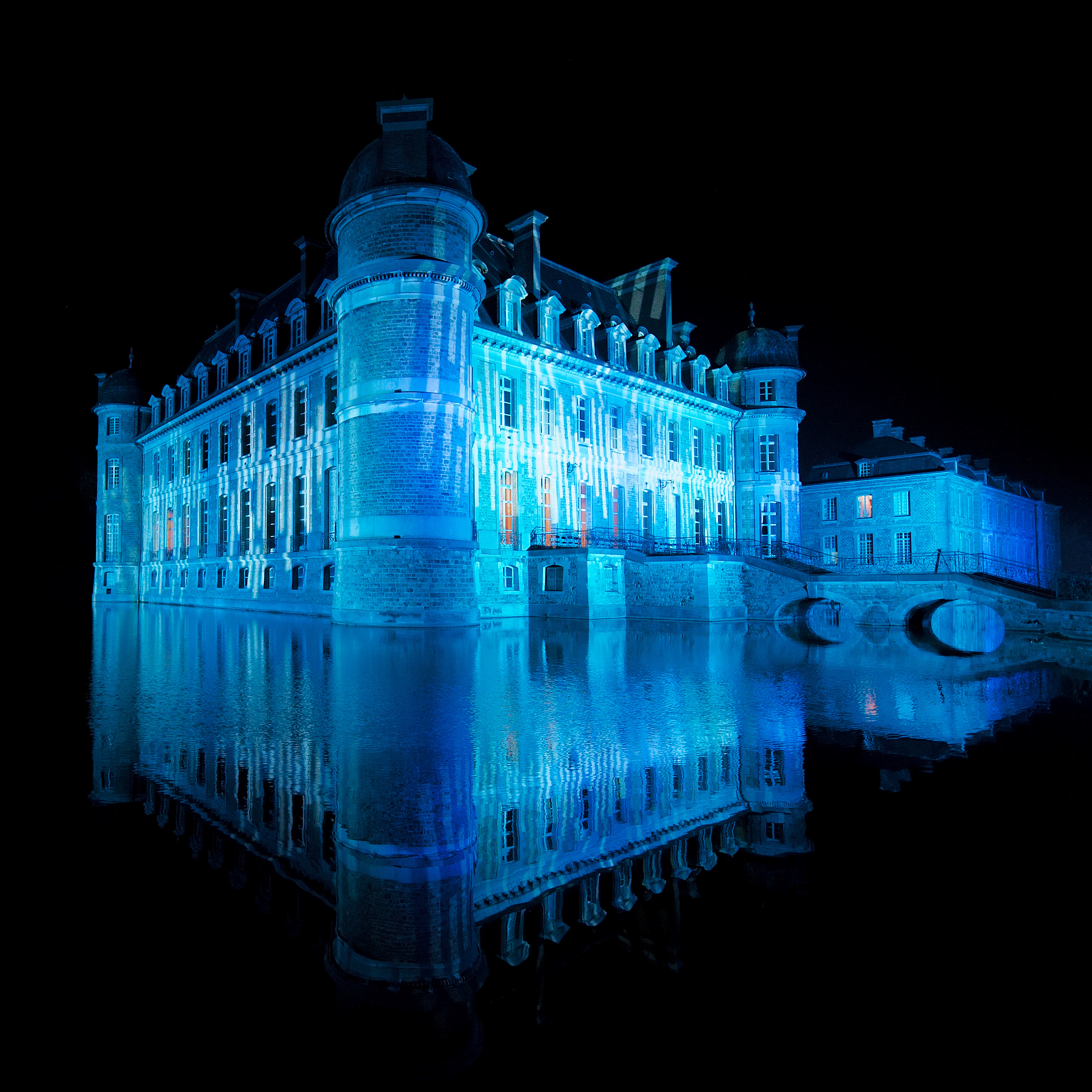
The rear of the château by night

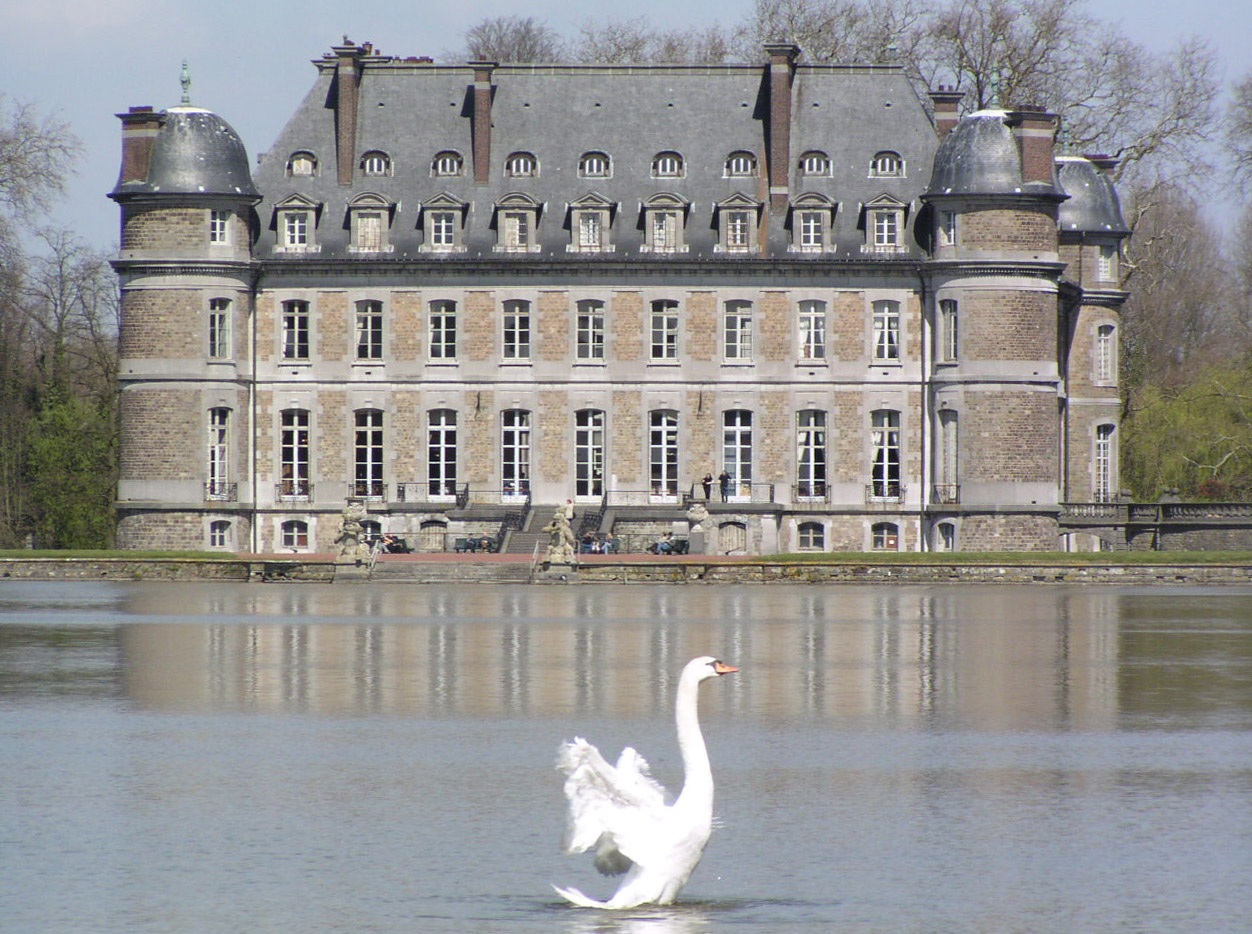
A swan in the moat

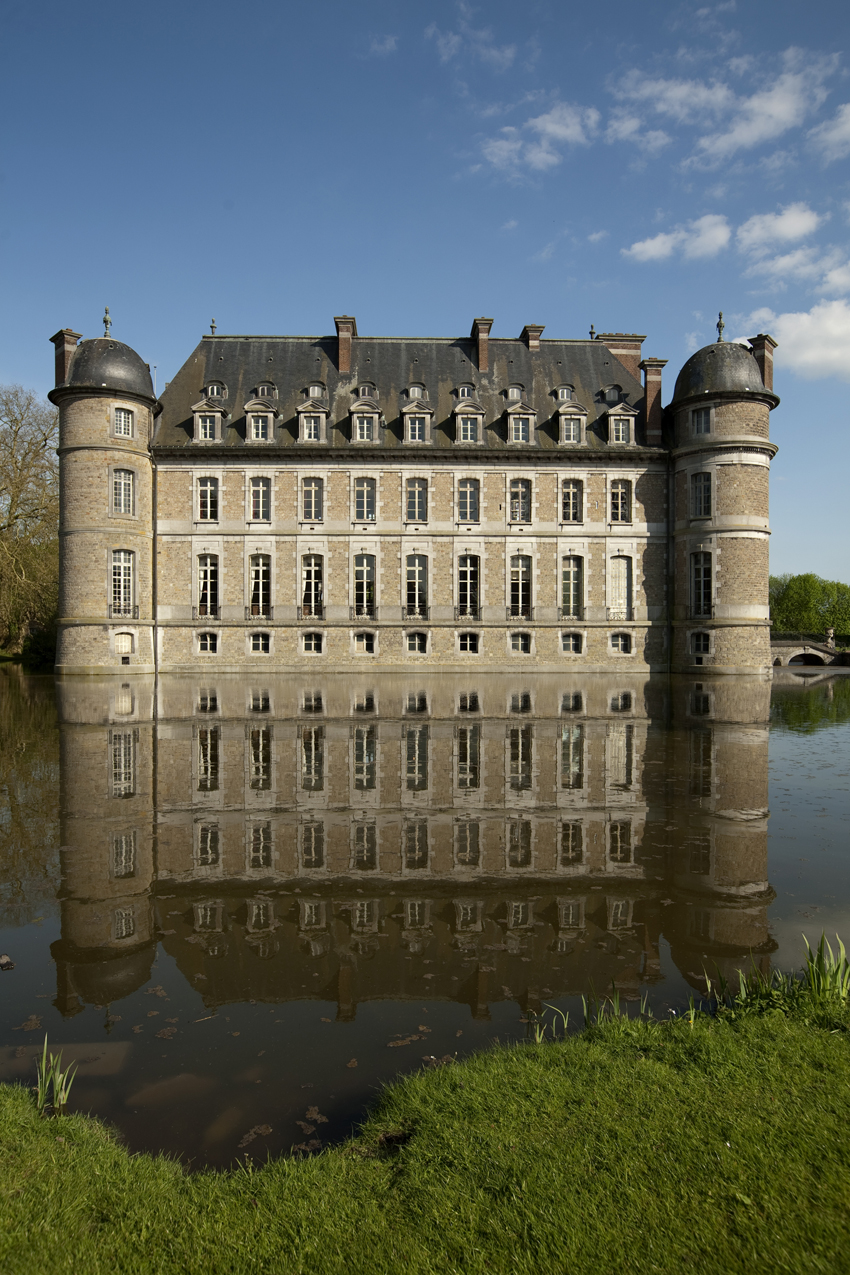
Side of the château

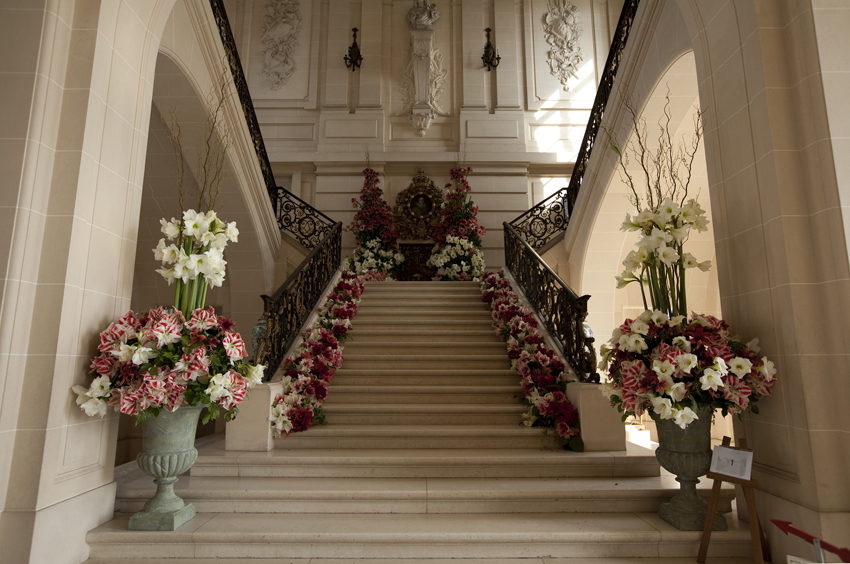
The stone staircase

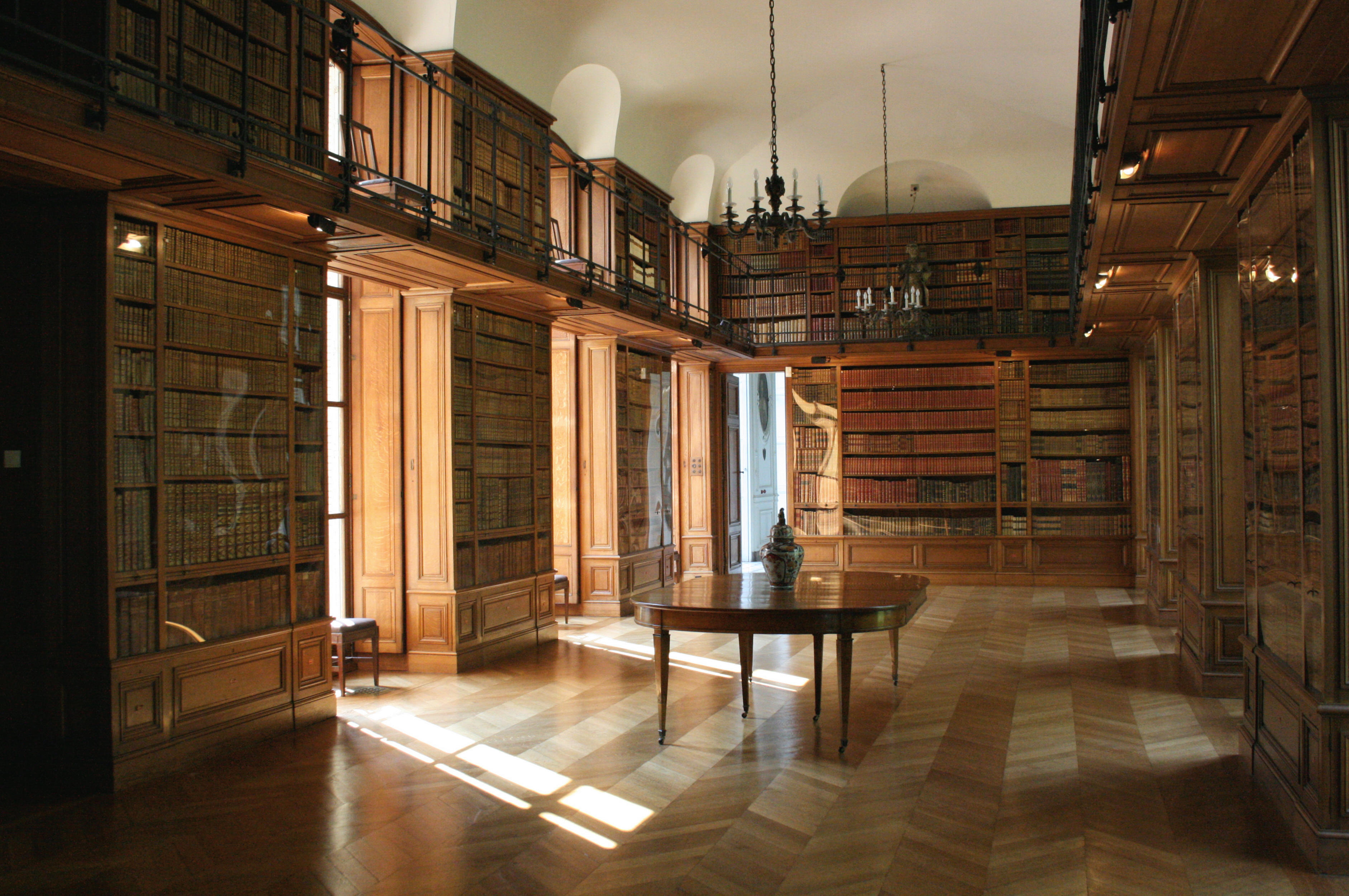
The château's library

== See also ==
- List of castles and châteaux in Belgium
