= List of princesses of Luxembourg =

This is a list of members of the Grand Ducal Family of Luxembourg who bear or have borne the title "Princess of Luxembourg". The title is typically born by daughters and some male line granddaughters of the grand dukes and grand duchesses of Luxembourg and spouses of princes of Luxembourg whose marriages have been dynastically approved.

Princesses of Luxembourg are also princesses of Nassau, and male line descendants of Prince Félix are princesses of Bourbon-Parma.

Traditionally, princesses bore the style of Grand Ducal Highness, but since Grand Duchess Charlotte's marriage to Prince Félix of Bourbon-Parma, all of their male line descendants have been styled as Royal Highness.

== Princesses of Luxembourg by birth ==
Portrait	Name	Born	Died	Royal lineage	Notes
	Hilda Charlotte Wilhelmine	5 November 1864	8 February 1952	Only daughter of Adolphe	Gained title in 1890 upon accession of her father Married Frederick, Hereditary Grand Duke of Baden in 1885
	Hilda Charlotte Wilhelmine	5 November 1864	8 February 1952	Only daughter of Adolphe	Became: The Grand Duchess of Baden
	Marie-Adélaïde Thérèse Hilda Wilhelmine later, Grand Duchess Marie-Adélaïde	14 June 1894	24 January 1924	Eldest daughter of Guillaume IV	Reigned as grand duchess from 1912 until her abdication in 1919
	Charlotte Adelgonde Elisabeth Marie Wilhelmine later, Grand Duchess Charlotte	23 January 1896	9 July 1985	Second daughter of Guillaume IV	Reigned as grand duchess from 1919 until her abdication in 1964; Married Prince Félix of Bourbon-Parma in 1919
	Hilda Sophie Marie Adélaïde Wilhelmine	15 February 1897	8 September 1979	Third daughter of Guillaume IV	Married Adolph, Hereditary Prince of Schwarzenberg in 1930
	Hilda Sophie Marie Adélaïde Wilhelmine	15 February 1897	8 September 1979	Third daughter of Guillaume IV	Became: The Princess of Schwarzenberg
	Antoinette Roberte Sophie Wilhelmine	7 October 1899	31 July 1954	Fourth daughter of Guillaume IV	Married Rupprecht, Crown Prince of Bavaria in 1921
	Antoinette Roberte Sophie Wilhelmine	7 October 1899	31 July 1954	Fourth daughter of Guillaume IV	Became: The Crown Princess of Bavaria
	Elisabeth Marie Wilhelmine	7 March 1901	2 August 1950	Fifth daughter of Guillaume IV	Married Prince Ludwig Philipp of Thurn and Taxis in 1922
	Elisabeth Marie Wilhelmine	7 March 1901	2 August 1950	Fifth daughter of Guillaume IV	Became: Princess Ludwig Philipp of Thurn and Taxis
	Sophie Caroline Marie Wilhelmine	14 February 1902	24 May 1941	Sixth daughter of Guillaume IV	Married Prince Ernst Heinrich of Saxony in 1921
	Sophie Caroline Marie Wilhelmine	14 February 1902	24 May 1941	Sixth daughter of Guillaume IV	Became: Princess Ernst Heinrich of Saxony
	Elisabeth Hilda Zita Marie Anna Antonia Friederike Wilhelmine Luise	22 December 1922	22 November 2011	Eldest daughter of Charlotte	Married Prince Franz Ferdinand of Hohenberg in 1956
	Elisabeth Hilda Zita Marie Anna Antonia Friederike Wilhelmine Luise	22 December 1922	22 November 2011	Eldest daughter of Charlotte	Became: The Duchess of Hohenberg
	Marie-Adélaïde Louise Thérèse Wilhelmine	21 May 1924	28 February 2007	Second daughter of Charlotte	Married Count Karl Josef Henckel von Donnersmarck in 1958
	Marie-Adélaïde Louise Thérèse Wilhelmine	21 May 1924	28 February 2007	Second daughter of Charlotte	Became: Countess Karl Josef Henckel von Donnersmarck
	Marie-Gabriele Aldegunde Wilhelmine Louise	2 August 1925	9 February 2023	Third daughter of Charlotte	Married Knud, Count of Holstein-Ledreborg in 1951
	Marie-Gabriele Aldegunde Wilhelmine Louise	2 August 1925	9 February 2023	Third daughter of Charlotte	Became: The Countess of Holstein-Ledreborg
	Alix Marie Anna Antoinette Charlotte Gabrielle	24 August 1929	11 February 2019	Fourth daughter of Charlotte	Married Antoine, Hereditary Prince of Ligne in 1950
	Alix Marie Anna Antoinette Charlotte Gabrielle	24 August 1929	11 February 2019	Fourth daughter of Charlotte	Became: The Princess de Ligne
	Marie-Astrid Liliane Charlotte Léopoldine Wilhelmine Ingeborg Antoinette Élisabeth Anne Alberte	17 February 1954		Eldest daughter of Jean	Married Archduke Carl Christian of Austria in 1982
	Marie-Astrid Liliane Charlotte Léopoldine Wilhelmine Ingeborg Antoinette Élisabeth Anne Alberte	17 February 1954		Eldest daughter of Jean	Became: Archduchess Marie-Astrid of Austria
	Margaretha Antonia Marie Félicité	15 May 1957		Second daughter of Jean	Married Prince Nikolaus of Liechtenstein in 1982
	Margaretha Antonia Marie Félicité	15 May 1957		Second daughter of Jean	Became: Princess Margaretha of Liechtenstein
	Charlotte Phyllis Marie	15 September 1967		Granddaughter of Charlotte	Married Marc-Victor Cunningham in 1993
	Charlotte Phyllis Marie	15 September 1967		Granddaughter of Charlotte	Became: Princess Charlotte, Mrs. Cunningham
	Alexandra Joséphine Teresa Charlotte Marie Wilhelmine	16 February 1991		Only daughter of Henri	Married Nicolas Bagory in 2023
	Alexandra Joséphine Teresa Charlotte Marie Wilhelmine	16 February 1991		Only daughter of Henri	Became: Princess Alexandra, Mrs. Bagory

== Princesses of Luxembourg by marriage ==
Portrait	Name	Husband	Born	Marriage	Died	Notes
	Infanta Maria Ana of Portugal	Hereditary Grand Duke Guillaume	13 July 1861	21 June 1893	31 July 1942	Became Grand Duchess consort upon her husband's accession in 1905; Regent from 1908 to 1912
	Princess Joséphine-Charlotte of Belgium	Hereditary Grand Duke Jean	11 October 1927	9 April 1953	10 January 2005	Became Grand Duchess consort upon her husband's accession in 1964
	Joan Dillon	Prince Charles	31 January 1935	1 March 1967		Lost title upon subsequent remarriage
	María Teresa Mestre y Batista	Hereditary Grand Duke Henri	22 March 1956	4/14 February 1981		Became Grand Duchess consort upon her husband's accession in 2000
	Sibilla Weiller	Prince Guillaume	12 June 1968	8/24 September 1994		
	Countess Stéphanie de Lannoy	Hereditary Grand Duke Guillaume	18 February 1984	19/20 October 2012		Became Grand Duchess consort upon her husband's accession in 2025
	Claire Lademacher	Prince Félix	21 March 1985	17/21 September 2013		
	Tessy Antony	Prince Louis	28 October 1985	29 September 2006 divorced, 4 April 2019		Title granted by decree on 23 June 2009; Lost title upon divorce

== See also ==
- Monarchy of Luxembourg
- List of princes of Luxembourg
