= List of princes of Luxembourg =

This is a list of members of the Grand Ducal Family of Luxembourg who bear or have borne the title "Prince of Luxembourg". The title is typically born by sons and some male line grandsons of the grand dukes and grand duchesses of Luxembourg.

Princes of Luxembourg are also princes of Nassau, and male line descendants of Prince Félix are princes of Bourbon-Parma.

Traditionally, princes bore the style of Grand Ducal Highness, but since Grand Duchess Charlotte's marriage to Prince Félix of Bourbon-Parma, all of their male line descendants have been styled as Royal Highness.

== Princes of Luxembourg ==
Portrait	Name	Born	Died	Royal lineage	Notes
	Guillaume Alexandre later, Grand Duke Guillaume IV	22 April 1852	25 February 1912	Only son of Adolphe	Hereditary Grand Duke from 1890; Grand Duke from 1905; Married Infanta Maria Ana of Portugal in 1893
	Félix Marie Vincent	28 October 1893	8 April 1970	Spouse of Charlotte	Prince of Bourbon-Parma by birth Created prince by decree in 1919; Married Charlotte, Grand Duchess of Luxembourg in 1919
	Jean Benoît Guillaume Robert Antoine Louis Marie Adolphe Marc d'Aviano later, Grand Duke Jean	5 January 1921	23 April 2019	Eldest son of Charlotte	Hereditary Grand Duke from 1939; Grand Duke from 1964 until his abdication in 2000; Married Princess Joséphine-Charlotte of Belgium in 1953
	Charles Frédéric Louis Guillaume Marie	7 August 1927	26 July 1977	Second son of Charlotte	Married Joan Dillon in 1967
	Henri Albert Gabriel Félix Marie Guillaume later, Grand Duke Henri	16 April 1955		Eldest son of Jean	Hereditary Grand Duke from 1964; Grand Duke from 2000; Married María Teresa Mestre y Batista in 1981
	Jean Félix Marie Guillaume	15 May 1957		Second son of Jean	Married, firstly, Hélène Vestur in 1987, divorced in 2004, secondly, Diane de Guerre in 2009
	Guillaume Marie Louis Christian	1 May 1963		Third son of Jean	Married Sibilla Weiller in 1994
	Robert Louis François Marie	14 August 1968		Grandson of Charlotte	Married Julie Ongaro in 1994
	Guillaume Jean Joseph Marie later, Grand Duke Guillaume V	11 November 1981		Eldest son of Henri	Hereditary Grand Duke from 2000 Grand Duke from 2025; Married Countess Stéphanie de Lannoy in 2012
	Félix Léopold Marie Guillaume	3 June 1984		Second son of Henri	Married Claire Lademacher in 2013
	Louis Xavier Marie Guillaume	3 August 1986		Third son of Henri	Married, firstly, Tessy Antony in 2006, divorced in 2019
	Sébastien Henri Marie Guillaume	16 April 1992		Fourth son of Henri	
	Charles Jean Philippe Joseph Marie Guillaume	10 May 2020		Eldest Son of Guillaume V	
	François Henri Louis Marie Guillaume	27 March 2023		Second Son of Guillaume V	

== See also ==
- Monarchy of Luxembourg
- List of princesses of Luxembourg
