= Colmar-Berg railway station =

Railway station in Luxembourg

Colmar-Berg Colmer-Bierg
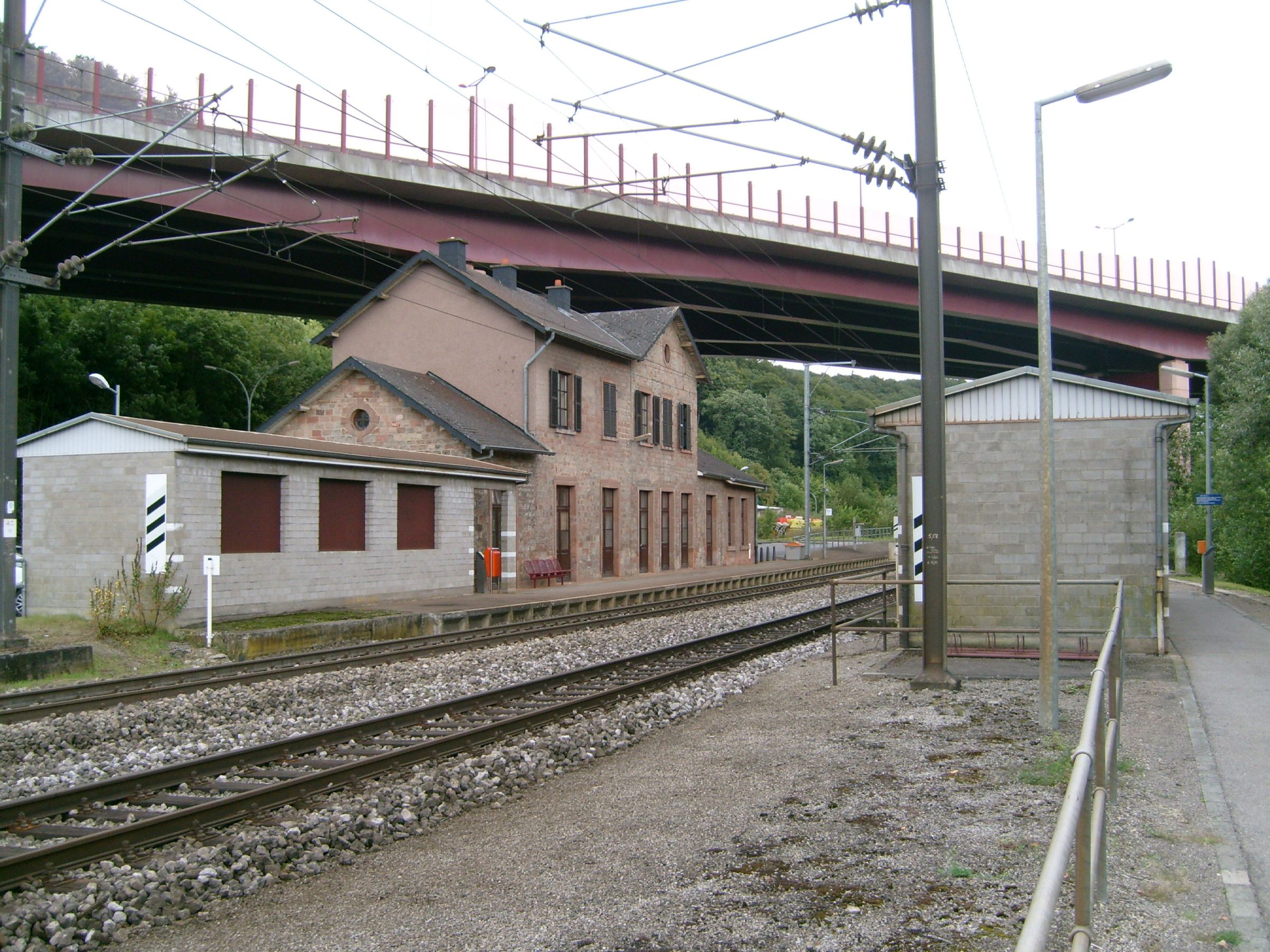

General information
- Location: Rue de Cruchten; L-7731 Colmar-Berg
- Coordinates: 49°48′54″N 06°06′04″E
- Operator: CFL
- Line: CFL Line 10
- Platforms: 2
- Tracks: 2
- Train operators: CFL

Construction
- Parking: 41 parking spaces
- Cycle facilities: 32 mBox cycle spaces

Other information
- Website: CFL

History
- Opened: 21 July 1862

Passengers
- 2022: 103,199
- Rank: 40 of 60

Services
Preceding station	CFL	Following station
Cruchten towards Luxembourg	Line 10	Schieren towards Diekirch
Location

Colmar-Berg railway station (Luxembourgish: Gare Colmer-Bierg, French: Gare de Colmar-Berg, German: Bahnhof Colmar-Berg) is a railway station serving Colmar-Berg, in central Luxembourg. It is operated by Chemins de Fer Luxembourgeois, the state-owned railway company.

The station is situated on Line 10, which connects Luxembourg City to the centre and north of the country.
