= Princess Elisabeth of Luxembourg (1922–2011) =

- Duchess of Hohenberg
- Born: 22 December 1922; Berg Castle, Luxembourg
- Died: 22 November 2011 (aged 88); Fischbach Castle, Fischbach, Luxembourg
- Burial: Artstetten Castle, Austria
- Spouse: Prince Franz, Duke of Hohenberg (m. 1956; died 1977)
- Issue: Princess Anita; Princess Sophie
Names
- Elisabeth Hilda Zita Marie Anna Antonia Friederike Wilhelmine Luise
- House: Nassau-Weilburg (official); Bourbon-Parma (agnatic)
- Father: Prince Felix of Bourbon-Parma
- Mother: Charlotte, Grand Duchess of Luxembourg

Princess Elisabeth, Duchess of Hohenberg (born Princess Elisabeth Hilda Zita Marie Anna Antonia Friederike Wilhelmine Luise of Luxembourg; 22 December 1922 – 22 November 2011) was a Luxembourgish princess, the daughter of Grand Duchess Charlotte and her husband, Prince Felix of Bourbon-Parma, the sister of Grand Duke Jean and the aunt of Grand Duke Henri. In 1956, she married Franz, Duke of Hohenberg.

== Biography ==
Princess Elisabeth was born at Berg Castle in Luxembourg on 22 December 1922 as the second child and first daughter of Grand Duchess Charlotte and Prince Felix. To commemorate her birth, Luxembourg issued a stamp as a souvenir sheet the following year, the world's first such miniature sheet.

Facing the German invasion on 10 May 1940 during World War II, the Grand Ducal Family of Luxembourg left the country to find refuge in Portugal, after receiving transit visas from the Portuguese consul Aristides de Sousa Mendes, in June 1940. They arrived at Vilar Formoso on 23 June 1940. After travelling through Coimbra and Lisbon, the family first stayed in Cascais, in Casa de Santa Maria, owned by Manuel Espírito Santo, who was then the honorary consul for Luxembourg in Portugal. By July they had moved to Monte Estoril, staying at the Chalet Posser de Andrade. On 10 July 1940, Princess Elisabeth, together with her father Prince Félix, her siblings, Heir Prince Jean, Princess Marie Adelaide, Princess Marie Gabriele, Prince Charles and Princess Alix, the nanny Justine Reinard and the chauffeur Eugène Niclou, along with his wife Joséphine, boarded the S.S. Trenton headed for New York City.

While Prince Félix and his children went to America, Grand Duchess Charlotte headed for London. Forced to respect American impartiality, the Grand Ducal Family settled for Montreal, Canada. With her father and brother Jean, Princess Elisabeth moved to London in 1942. With her sister Princess Marie Adelaide of Luxembourg, she attended Convent of the Sacred Heart in Roehampton, England, and the Collège Jésus-Marie de Sillery, near Quebec City, Canada. After the war ended, the Grand Ducal Family regained the grand duchy.

Together with her parents, her brother Jean and his wife, she took part in the ship tour organized by Queen Frederica and her husband King Paul of Greece in 1954, which became known as the “Cruise of the Kings” and was attended by over 100 royals from all over Europe.

== Marriage and issue ==
She married Franz, Duke of Hohenberg (1927–1977) in Luxembourg on 9 May 1956. He was a grandson of Archduke Franz Ferdinand of Austria, whose assassination in 1914 sparked World War I.

They had two daughters, Anita and Sophie, and seven grandchildren and seven great-grandchildren.

== Final years ==
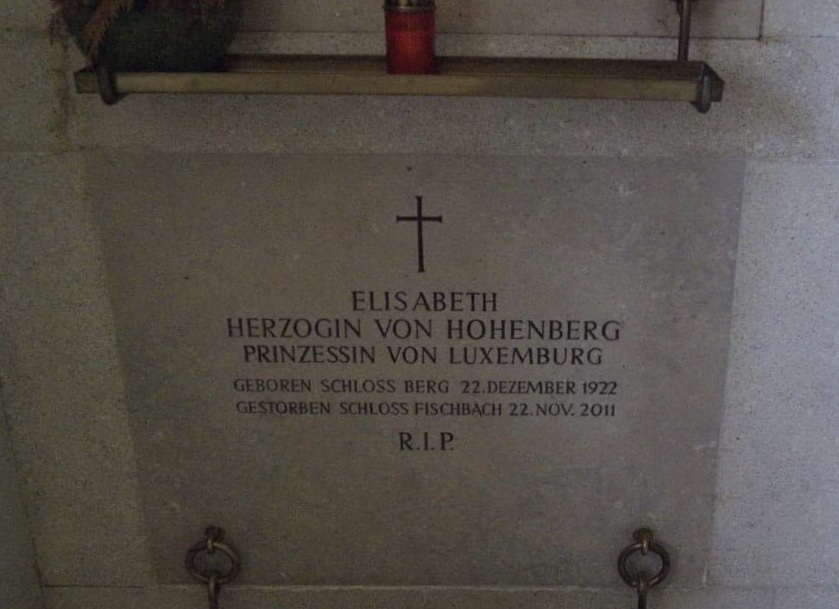
Elisabeth's gravestone in Artstetten Castle

Princess Elisabeth returned to Luxembourg after her husband's death in 1977. In 1983 she inherited Artstetten Castle, which she ceded that year to her oldest daughter, Anita de La Poëze d´Harambure. Following the death of her mother Grand Duchess Charlotte, in 1985, she moved to Wasserhaf, near Fischbach Castle. Between 1980 and 1990, she participated in Luxembourgish official ceremonies. Towards the end of her life, she resided at Fischbach Castle with her older brother, Grand Duke Jean.

She died at Fischbach Castle on 22 November 2011 aged 88, following a stroke in 2010. She was cremated and buried next to her husband in a crypt at Artstetten Castle.
