= Princess Marie Gabrielle of Luxembourg =

Luxembourgish princess (1925–2023)

Princess Marie-Gabrielle
- Countess of Holstein-Ledreborg
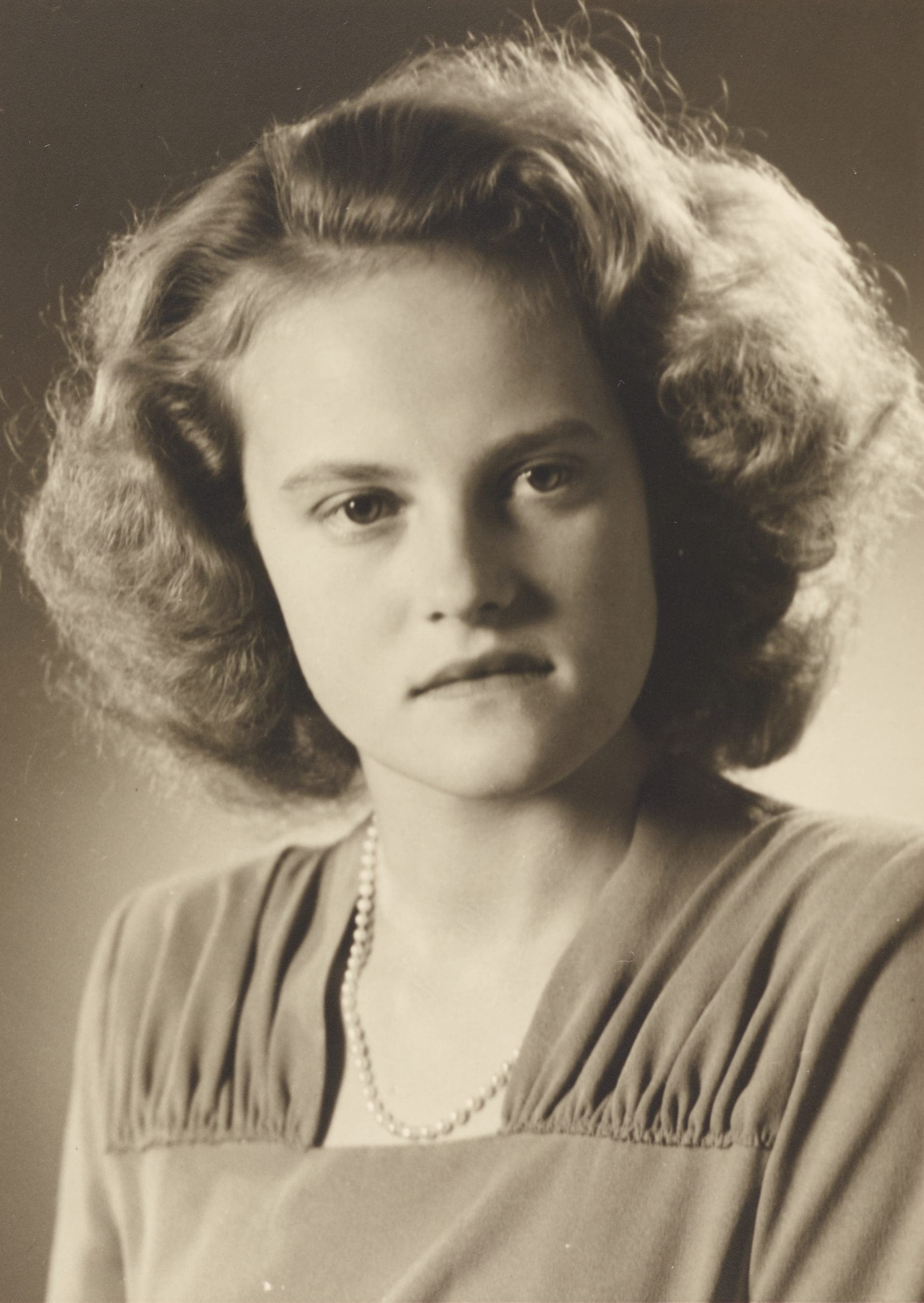
- Marie Gabrielle, circa 1945
- Born: 2 August 1925; Berg Castle, Colmar-Berg, Luxembourg
- Died: 9 February 2023 (aged 97); Ledreborg Castle, Denmark
- Spouse: Knud, 7th Count of Holstein-Ledreborg (m. 1951; died 2001)
- Issue: Countess Monica; Lydia, Princess Erik of Bourbon-Parma; Countess Veronica; Countess Silvia; Camilla, Baroness Eric Bertouch-Lehn; Countess Tatiana; Countess Antonia
- House: Nassau-Weilburg (official); Bourbon-Parma (agnatic)
- Father: Prince Felix of Bourbon-Parma
- Mother: Charlotte, Grand Duchess of Luxembourg

Princess Marie-Gabrielle of Luxembourg (Marie-Gabrielle Aldegunde Wilhelmine Louise; 2 August 1925 – 9 February 2023) was a Luxembourgish princess, the third daughter and fourth child of Grand Duchess Charlotte (1896–1985) and Prince Felix of Bourbon-Parma (1893–1970).

== Early life ==
Princess Marie-Gabrielle was born at Berg Castle, Colmar-Berg, Luxembourg, as Princess of Luxembourg, Princess of Nassau, Princess of Bourbon-Parma.

Facing the German invasion on 10 May 1940 during World War II, the Grand Ducal Family of Luxembourg left the country to find refuge in Portugal, after receiving transit visas from the Portuguese consul Aristides de Sousa Mendes, in June 1940. They arrived at Vilar Formoso on 23 June 1940. After travelling through Coimbra and Lisbon, the family first stayed in Cascais, in Casa de Santa Maria, owned by Manuel Espírito Santo, who was then the honorary consul for Luxembourg in Portugal. By July they had moved to Monte Estoril, staying at the Chalet Posser de Andrade.

On 10 July 1940, Princess Marie Gabrielle, together with her father Prince Félix, her siblings, Hereditary Grand Duke Jean, Princess Elisabeth, Princess Marie Adelaide, Prince Charles and Princess Alix, the nanny Justine Reinard and the chauffeur Eugène Niclou, along with his wife Joséphine, boarded the S.S. Trenton headed for New York City. In order not to void the United States' then neutrality, the family moved to Canada. During their stay in the country, Marie-Gabrielle and her sisters attended the "Collège Jesus-Marie de Sillery", in Québec, and settled in the "Villa Saint-Joseph", inhabited by their paternal aunt, Princess Zita of Bourbon-Parma, Empress of Austria, which hosted them. Subsequently, in 1943, Princess Marie-Gabrielle settled in the United Kingdom, where, together with her sisters, she volunteered for the British Red Cross.

Two years later, on 17 April 1945, she returned to post-war Luxembourg with her sisters and brother Charles. Later, Princess Marie-Gabrielle studied sculpture with Auguste Tremont: in 1950, she exhibited her works at the Salon des Animaliers in Paris, under the pseudonym, "Mademoiselle de Clervaux".

Princess Marie-Gabrielle became godmother to the future Grand Duke Henri, born in 1955.

== Marriage and family ==
Princess Marie-Gabrielle met her future husband Count Knud Johan Ludvig of Holstein-Ledreborg (2 October 1919 – 25 June 2001), descendant of Count Ludvig Holstein-Ledreborg, at the 1946 silver wedding of her uncle Prince René of Bourbon-Parma and his wife Princess Margrethe of Denmark, which was celebrated at 'Bernstorffshøj' - the home of Prince Axel of Denmark.

They married civilly on 5 November 1951 and religiously the following day at Berg Castle. The family settled in Ledreborg.

They had seven daughters:

- Countess Monica Charlotte Louise Maria (born 29 July 1952), married in 2003 Henrik de Dompierre de Jonquières and no issue;
- Countess Lydia Marie Adelaide (born 22 February 1955), married on 8 August 1980 Prince Erik of Bourbon-Parma (1953–2021) and had issue;
- Countess Veronica Birgitte Marie (born 19 January 1956), married on 18 August 1979 François Bruno de Pottere and had issue;
- Countess Silvia Charlotte Marie (born 1 January 1958), married on 4 August 1979 John Munro of Foulis and had issue;
- Countess Camilla Josephine Marie (26 February 1959 – 4 July 2010), married on 11 January 1986 Baron Eric Bertouch-Lehn and had issue;
- Countess Tatiana Alix Marie (born 25 April 1961), married on 14 August 1999 Mark von Riedemann and had issue;
- Countess Antonia Charlotte Marie Jeannette (born 19 June 1962), became a nun in the Emmanuel Community in 1992.

== Death ==
Princess Marie-Gabrielle died in Ledreborg Castle, Denmark on 9 February 2023 at the age of 97. The causes of her death were not specified. The announcement of her death was published on the website of the Luxembourg Grand-Ducal Family. She was the last surviving child of Grand Duchess Charlotte and Prince Felix.

Princess Marie-Gabrielle's funeral was held on the morning of 18 February 2023 at Ledreborg Castle, Copenhagen, Denmark. Grand Duke Henri also attended.
