= Château de Montastruc =

Coordinates: 44°53′49″N 0°35′24″E

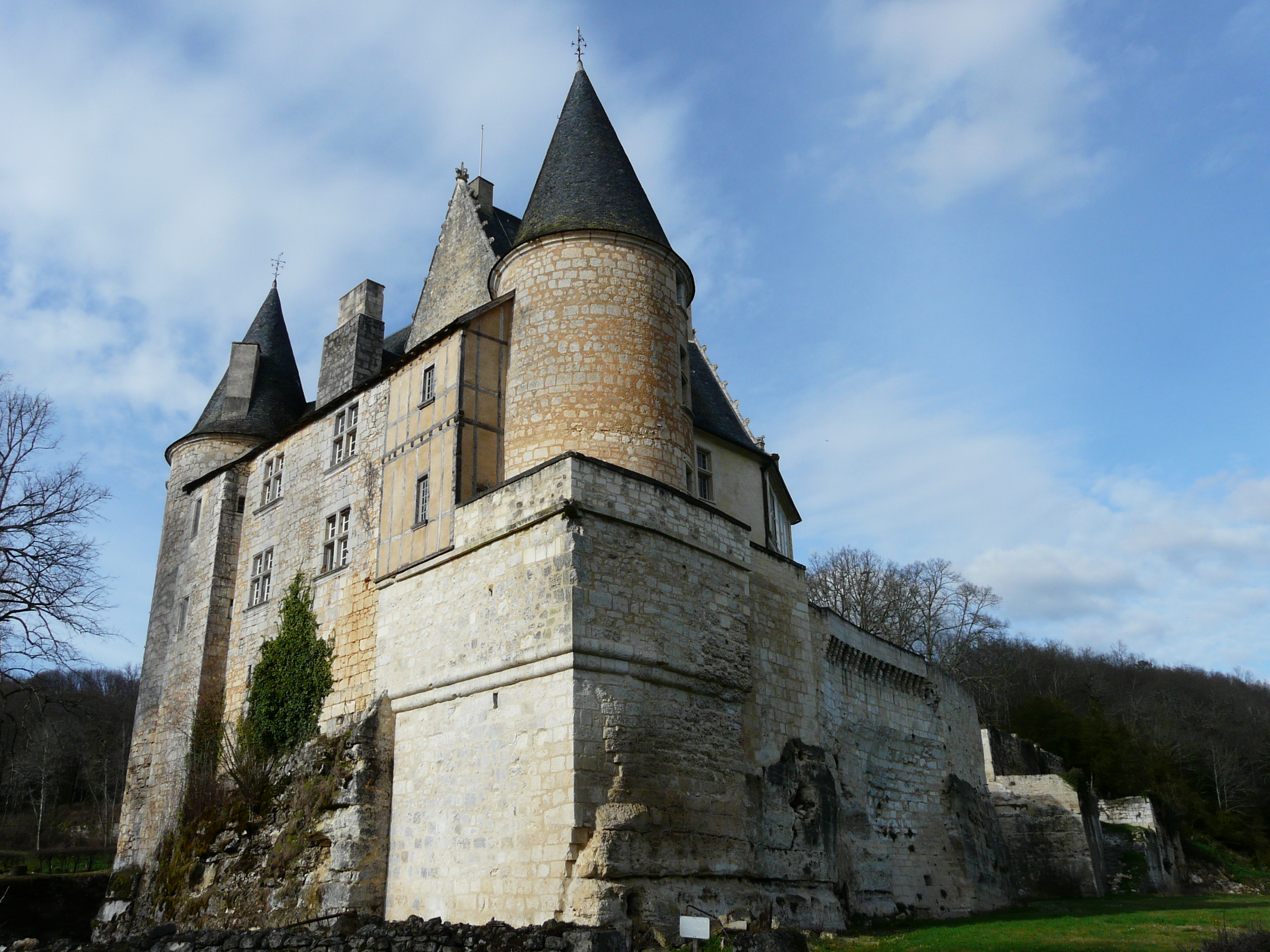
Château de Montastruc seen from the south, the medieval Gothic part.

The Château de Montastruc is a French castle, château, in the commune of Lamonzie-Montastruc, in the department of Dordogne, in the region of Nouvelle-Aquitaine, in France. It was built in the 13th century and modified in the 15th and 18th centuries.

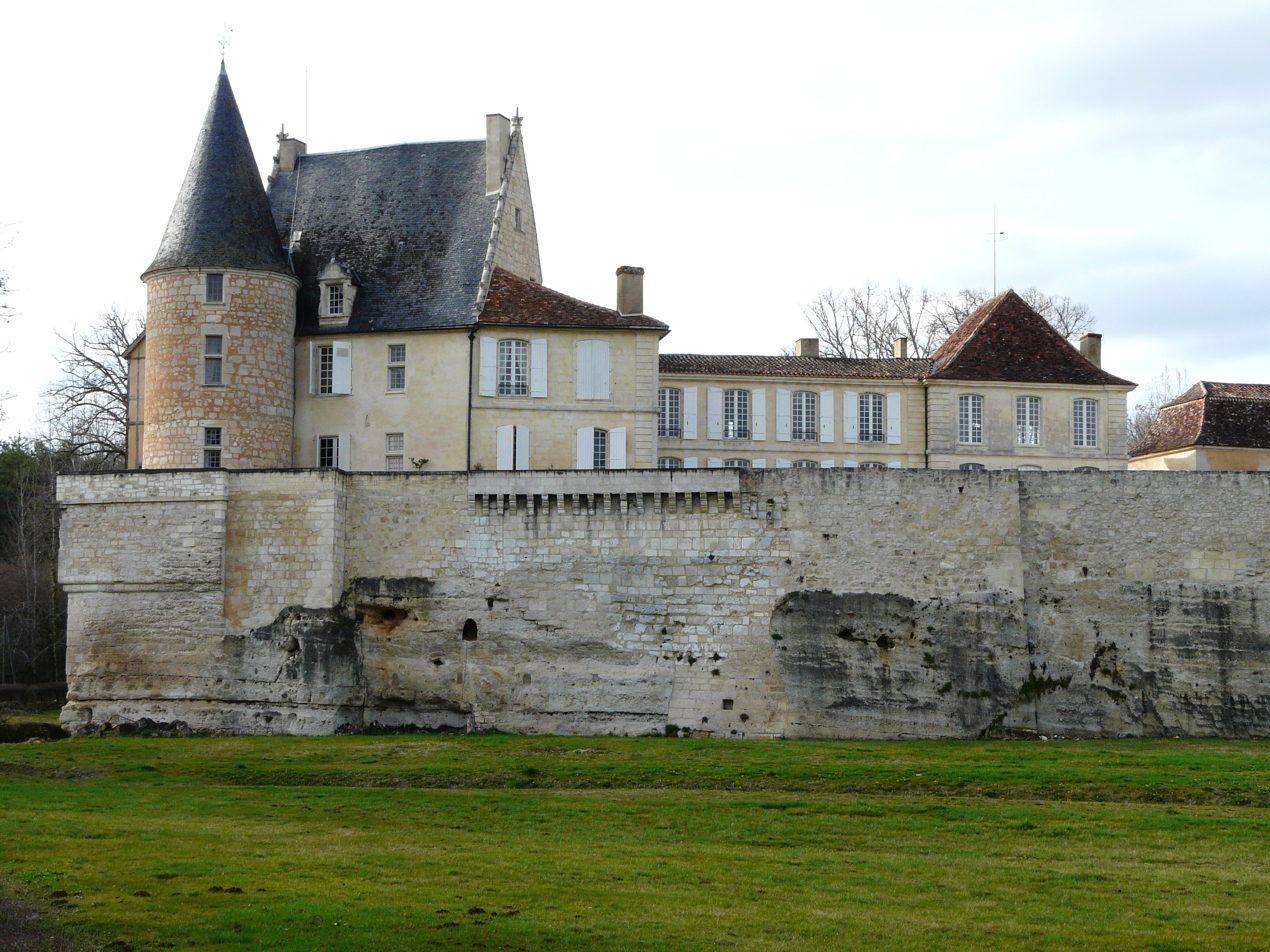
The Castle of Montastruc on its rock, seen from the southeast.

== Overview ==
The Château de Montastruc is located in the region of Périgord Pourpre, in the southern part of the department of Dordogne, 100 meters west of the D21 departmental road. It sits on a rocky outcrop northwest of the village of Lamonzie-Montastruc, on the banks of the River Caudeau. The little river valley, at the foot of Montastruc, keeps numerous traces of human habitat from prehistory to the period of the Roman Empire.

The first owners were the family of d'Abzac de la Douze in the 13th century. Its name comes from the Latin derived mons adstructum, “fortified mount” or also “mount under the stars”.

It is now privately owned by the family of Raynaud de Fitte. Philippe Reynaud de Fitte and his wife, Ségolène de Marcellus, bought the dilapidated and almost ruined castle in 1998. A major renovation work started in 2000 by restoring the main castle, its leaking roofs with big holes, facades, windows and interiors. The restoration of the ramparts and restitutions of the machicolations of the bastion supporting the castle and the main courtyard was done, as well as of the access bridge and ramparts supporting it.

Also the 18th century stables were restored. By 2025 the moat, its hydraulic system controlling the water, the west facade, the prehistoric caves and the Gallo-Roman bastions still remain to be restored.

Partially listed as a historical monument in 1973, it has been fully listed since 2001 by the Ministry of Culture of France.

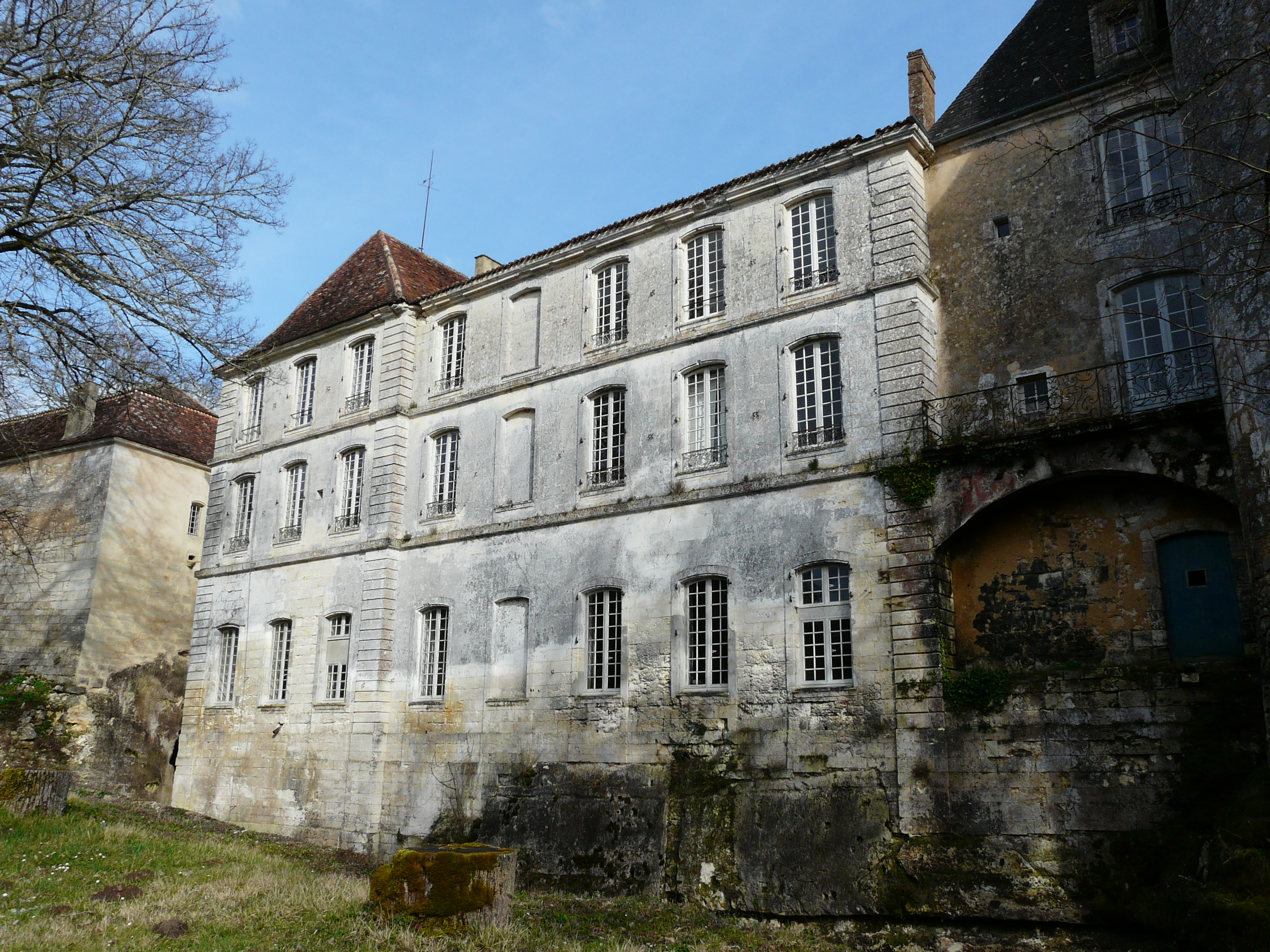
The northwest facade of the Castle of Montastruc.

== History ==
The site has been inhabited since ancient times. The castle was built on a rocky outcrop that sheltered prehistoric cave dwellings. The medieval castle overlooks the rock.

In the 14th century, the castle was one of the fiefs of the Abzac de la Douze family, one of whose members was Lieutenant General of the King of England in Guyenne. He was beheaded in Limoges in 1438, and his castle was razed after the Hundred Years' War on the orders of King Charles VII of France. After being returned to the family in 1449 upon their submission to royal authority, the castle was rebuilt in 1471. Montastruc was besieged by Blaise de Montluc in 1568, and two cannons forced him to surrender. In 1569, during the French Wars of Religion, it was captured from the Protestants by the Seneschal of Périgord.

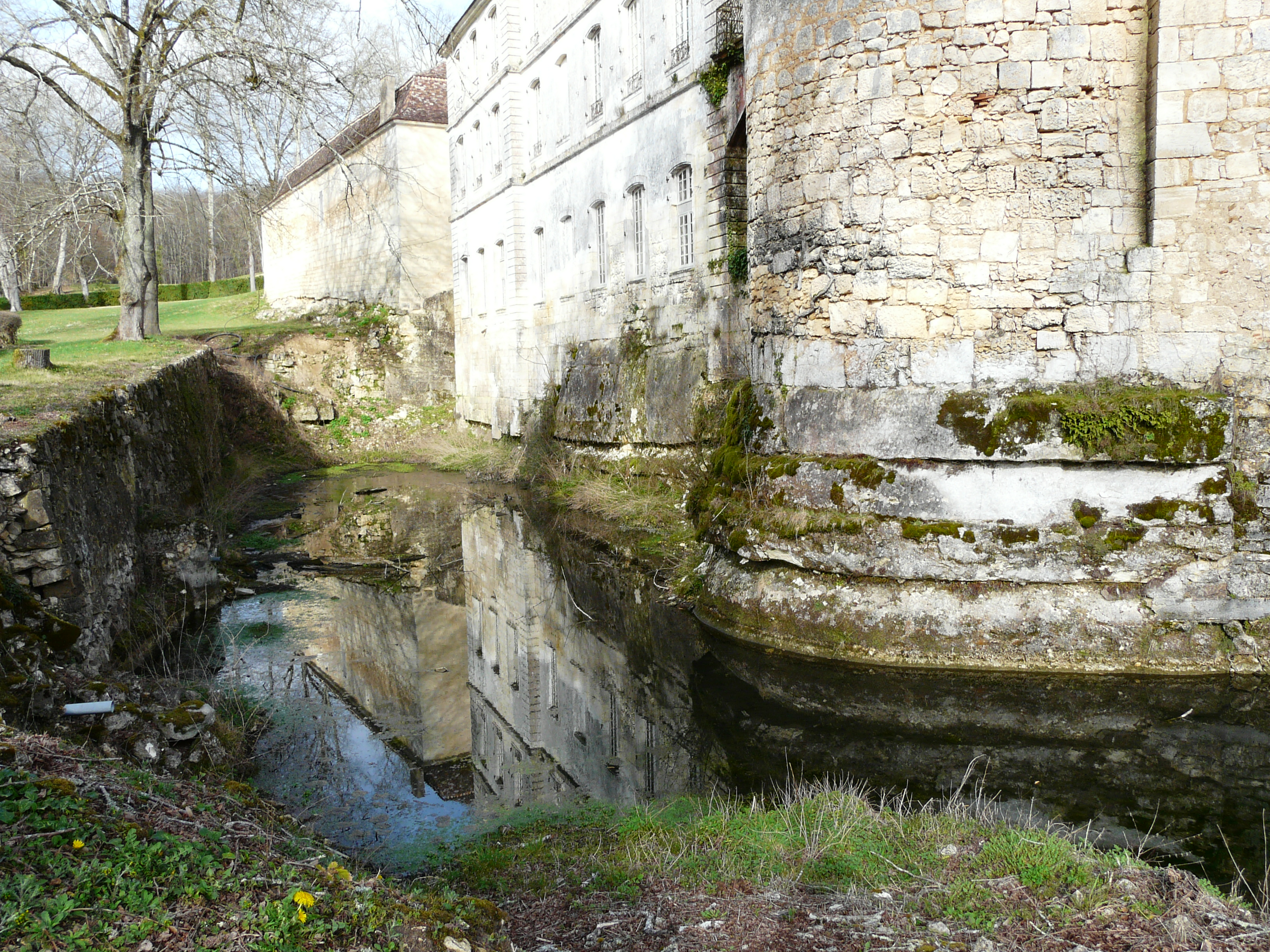
The west side of the moat of the Castle of Montastruc.

Montastruc changes hands through alliances and goes to the Ferrand de Mauvezin, the Peruse des Cars, the du Garrich d’Uzech, and then in 1849, goes to the Marquis de Lostanges de Saint-Alvere followed by the Loeff in 1936. After the Second World War, it was owned by the Ordonneau family.

During the Second World War, the château briefly in summer of 1940 housed HRH Grand Duchess Charlotte of Luxembourg her husband Prince Félix of Bourbon-Parme and their children, following their exile due to the advancing German troops.

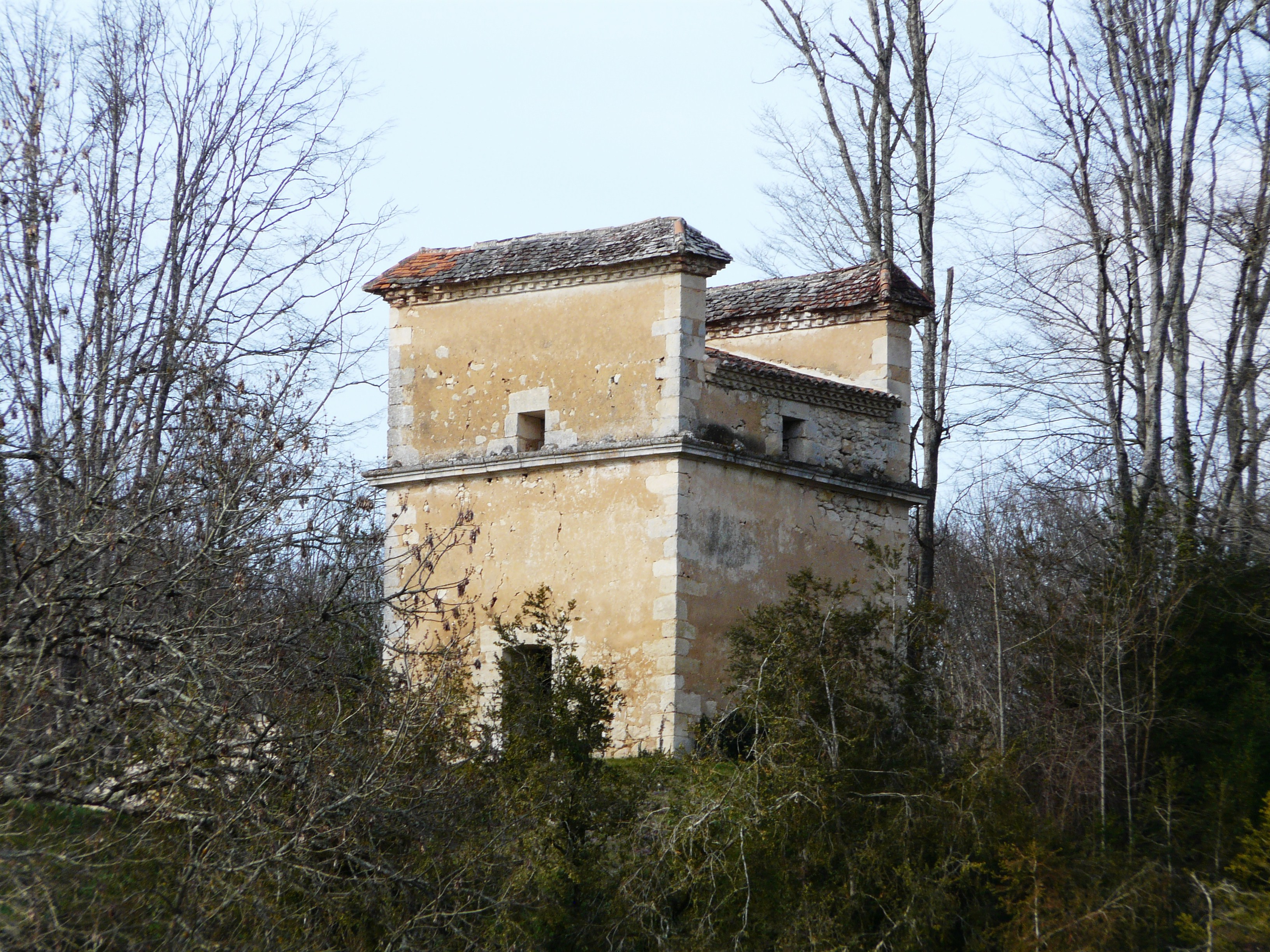
The dovecote of the Castle of Montastruc seen from the south.

== Architecture ==
The Château de Montastruc consists of the medieval main building, partly rebuilt in the 18th century, and various outbuildings: stables, remains of the barn, dovecote and oratory.

A drawbridge, replaced in the 18th century by a stone bridge, connected it to the outside. A curtain wall with machicolations ran directly above the base. Built upon the 13th and 14th-century substructures, a main building, set at a right angle and flanked by three towers, was reconstructed at the end of the 15th century and appears to have been enlarged on the west side in the 16th century by filling the space between the two towers. At the junction of this side and the northwest tower, a slight projection allowed for the construction of a small oratory on the upper floor, consisting of three narrow bays with ribbed vaults, of which only the springing points of the arches on sculpted corbels remain.

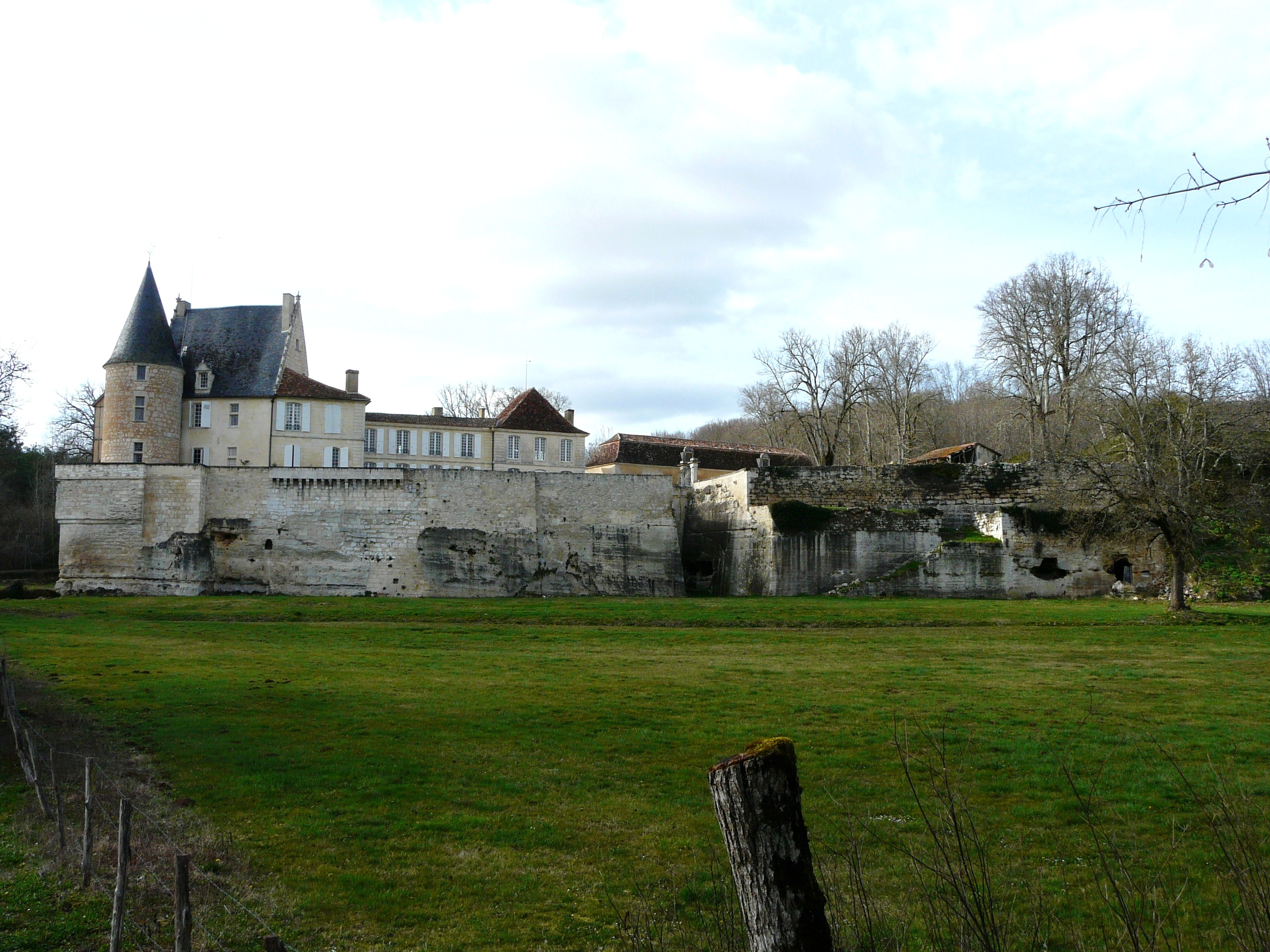
The Castle of Montastruc on its rocky outcrop, seen from the southeast.

Between 1760 and 1780, a second building, also set at a right angle, was added to the original castle. This building has a short side adorned with a pediment erected on the site of the third tower, the design of which survives in the stairwell. The long side ends with a pavilion.

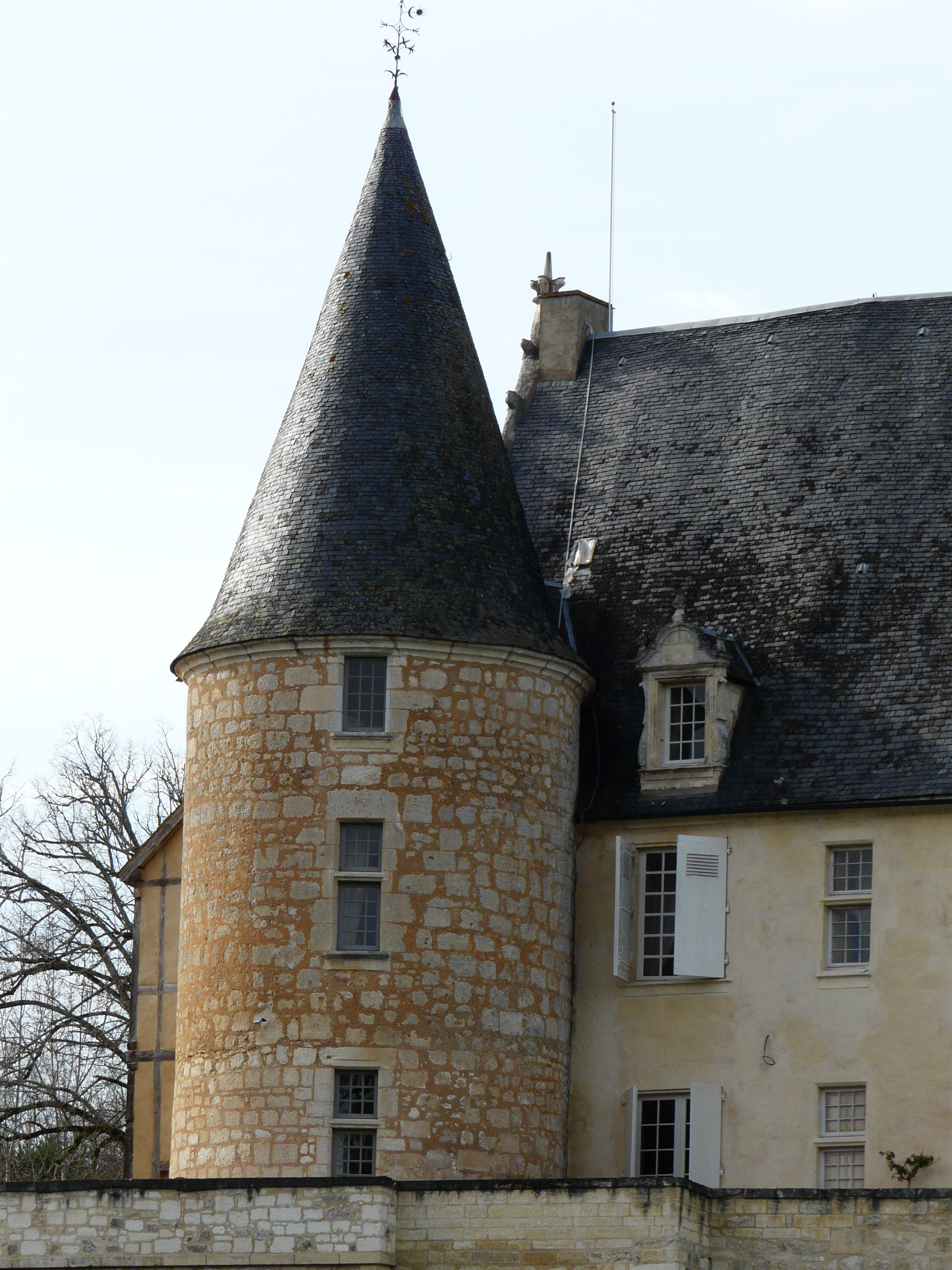
The south tower of the Castle of Montastruc.

== Park and gardens ==
The park was redesigned in the 19th century. The arboretum of rare varieties of trees was created during 2000–2025.
