= Prince Charles of Luxembourg =

Prince Charles of Luxembourg may refer to:

- Prince Charles of Luxembourg (1927–1977)
- Prince Charles of Luxembourg (born 2020), son of Guillaume V, Grand Duke of Luxembourg and first in line to the throne of Luxembourg
