= Princess Marie Adelaide of Luxembourg =

Princess Marie-Adélaïde
- Countess Karl Josef Henckel von Donnersmarck
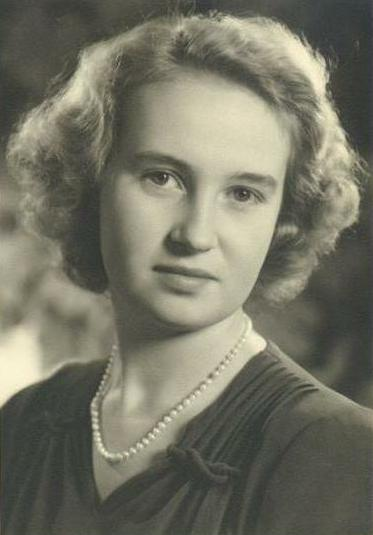
- Marie-Adélaïde, circa 1945
- Born: 21 May 1924; Berg Castle, Colmar-Berg, Luxembourg
- Died: 28 February 2007 (aged 82); Fischbach, Mersch, Luxembourg
- Spouse: Count Karl Josef Henckel von Donnersmarck (m. 1958)
- Issue: Count Andreas; Count Félix; Count Heinrich; Charlotte, Countess Christoph Johannes von Meran
- House: Nassau-Weilburg (official); Bourbon-Parma (agnatic)
- Father: Prince Felix of Bourbon-Parma
- Mother: Charlotte, Grand Duchess of Luxembourg

Princess Marie-Adélaïde of Luxembourg (Marie-Adélaïde Louise Thérèse Wilhelmine; 21 May 1924 – 28 February 2007) was a Luxembourgish princess, the third child and the second daughter of Grand Duchess Charlotte and Prince Felix of Bourbon-Parma.

== Biography ==
Princess Marie Adelaide was born at Berg Castle, Colmar-Berg, Luxembourg, as Princess of Luxembourg, Princess of Nassau, Princess of Bourbon-Parma.

Facing the German invasion on 10 May 1940 during World War II, the Grand Ducal Family of Luxembourg left the country to find refuge in Portugal, after receiving transit visas from the Portuguese consul Aristides de Sousa Mendes, in June 1940. They arrived at Vilar Formoso on 23 June 1940. After travelling through Coimbra and Lisbon, the family first stayed in Cascais, in Casa de Santa Maria, owned by Manuel Espírito Santo, who was then the honorary consul for Luxembourg in Portugal. By July they had moved to Monte Estoril, staying at the Chalet Posser de Andrade. On 10 July 1940, Princess Marie Adelaide, together with her father Prince Félix, her siblings, Hereditary Grand Duke Jean, Princess Elisabeth, Princess Marie Gabriele, Prince Charles and Princess Alix, the nanny Justine Reinard and the chauffeur Eugène Niclou, along with his wife Joséphine, boarded the S.S. Trenton headed for New York City.

With her sister Princess Elisabeth, Duchess of Hohenberg, Princess Marie Adelaide attended the Convent of the Sacred Heart, Roehampton in Britain and the Collège Jésus-Marie de Sillery, near Quebec City, during the family's exile during World War II.

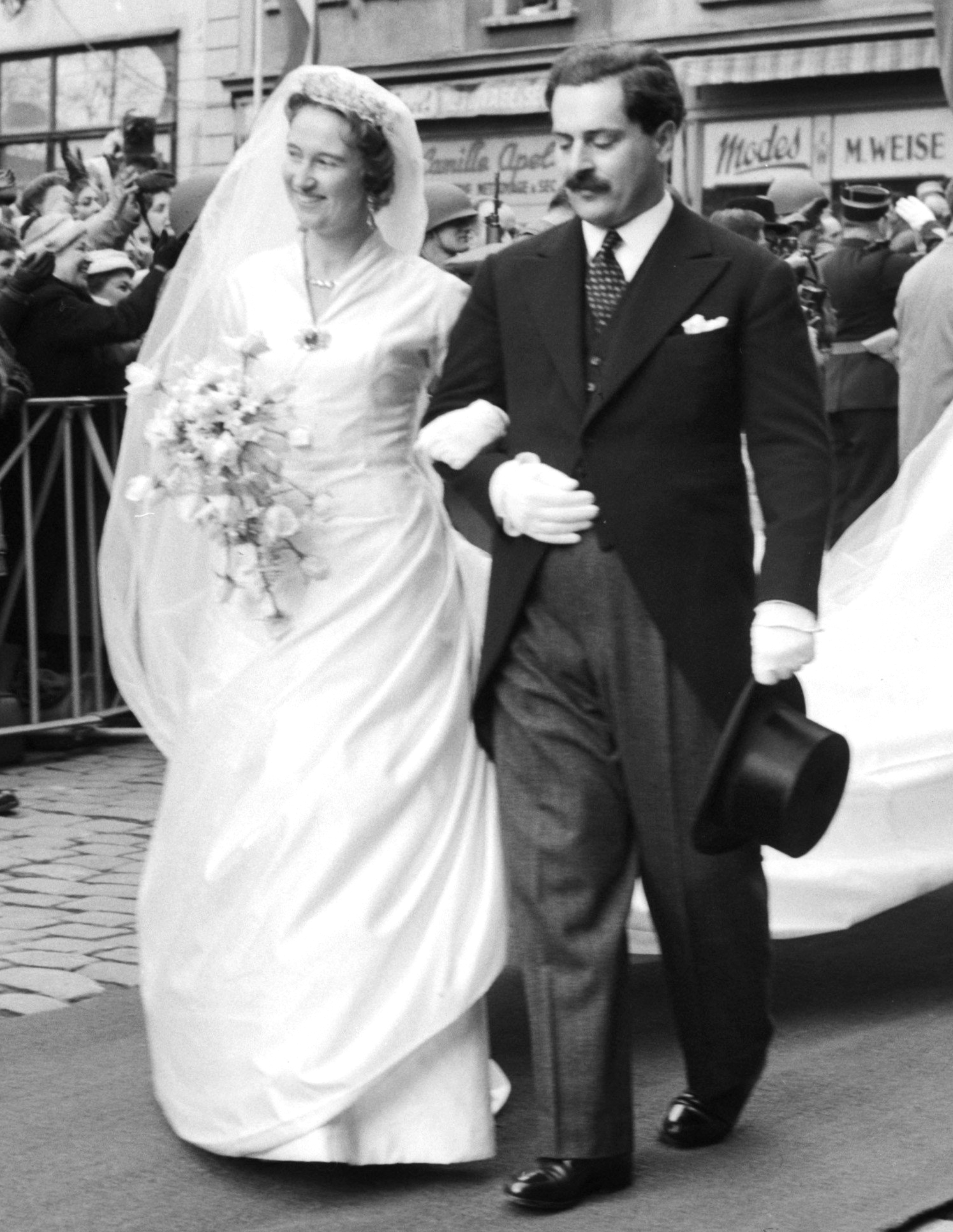
Marie-Adélaïde and her husband Karl Josef in their wedding day

She married Count Karl Josef Henckel von Donnersmarck (7 November 1928, Romolkwitz, Silesia, Germany – 16 April 2008, Sliema, Malta) on 10 April 1958 in Luxembourg. They had four children – three sons and a daughter - and eight grandchildren:

- Andreas, Count Henckel von Donnersmarck (born 30 March 1959, Schloss Berg, Luxembourg) — on 17 June 1995 in Strobl, Austria, he married Princess Johanna von Hohenberg (b. 29 April 1966, Vienna, Austria), great-granddaughter of Archduke Franz Ferdinand of Austria and they have four children.
- Count Félix Henckel von Donnersmarck (2 March 1960, Schloss Berg, Luxembourg – 28 October 2007)
- Count Heinrich Henckel von Donnersmarck (born 13 November 1961, Luxembourg) — on 12 September 1998 in Schwertberg, Austria, he married Anna-Maria Merckens (born 13 February 1969, Linz, Austria) and they have one son.
- Countess Charlotte Henckel von Donnersmarck (born 4 August 1965, Fischbach, Luxembourg) — on 27 November 1999, in Wolfsberg, Carinthia, Austria, she married Graf Christoph Johannes von Meran (born 26 August 1963, Innsbruck, Austria) and they have three children.
