= Colmar-Berg =

Colmar-Berg Colmer-Bierg
- Commune
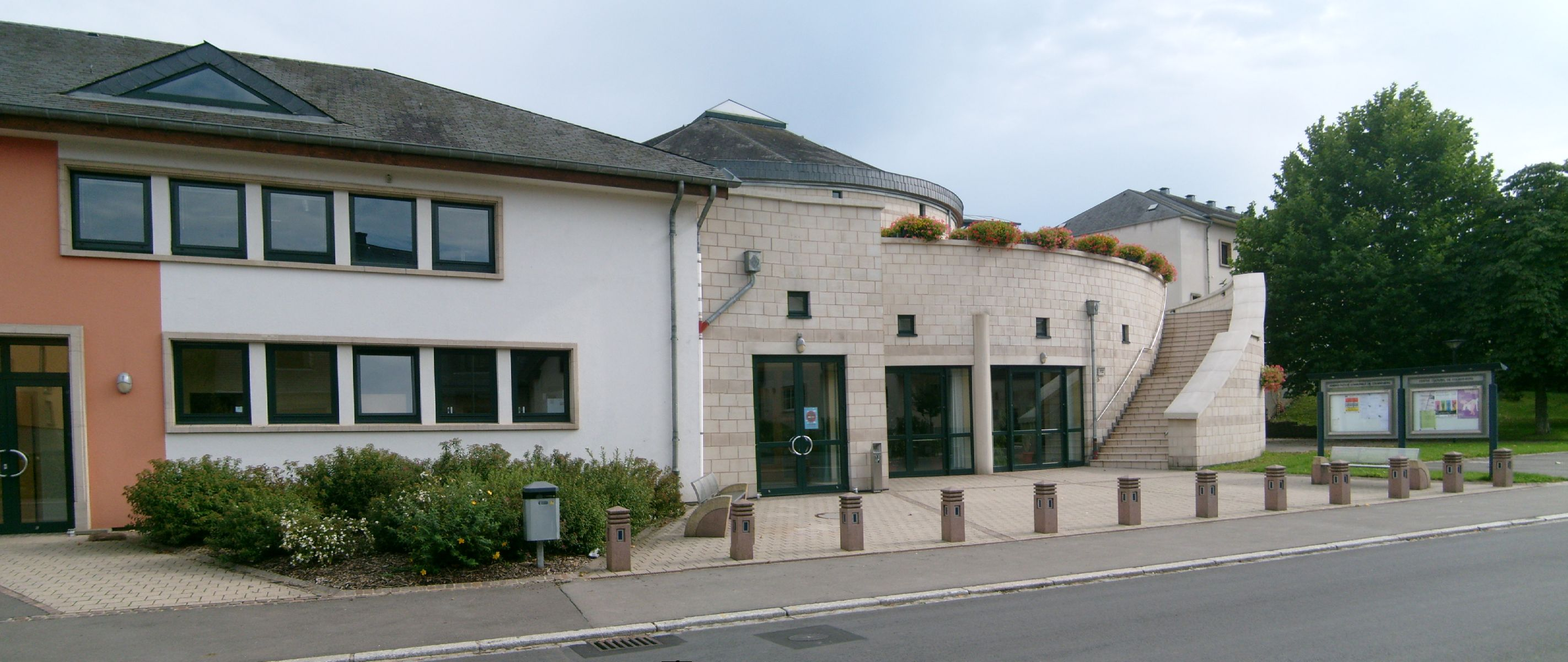
- Town hall

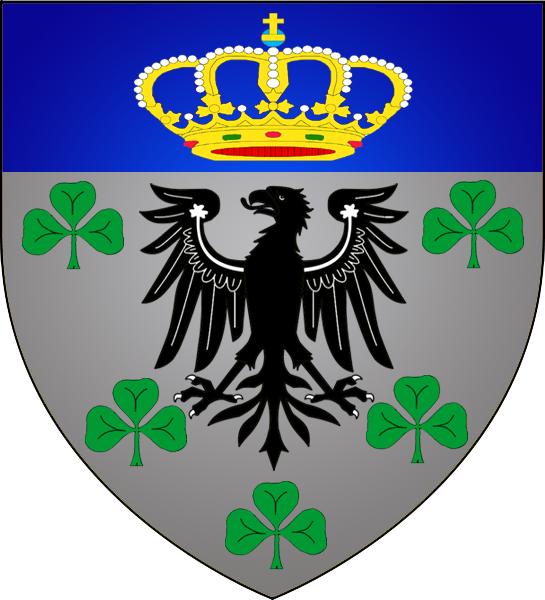
- Coat of arms

- Map of Luxembourg with Colmar-Berg highlighted in orange, and the canton in dark red
- Coordinates: 49.8111°N 6.0972°E
- Country: Luxembourg
- Canton: Mersch

Government
  - Mayor: Mandy Arendt (PPL)

Area
  - Total: 12.31 km^{2} (4.75 sq mi)
  - Rank: 88th of 100
- Highest elevation: 372 m (1,220 ft)
  - Rank: 73rd of 100
- Lowest elevation: 201 m (659 ft)
  - Rank: 26th of 100

Population
  - Total: 2,471
  - Rank: 67th of 100
  - Density: 200.7/km^{2} (519.9/sq mi)
  - Rank: 44th of 100
- Time zone: UTC+1 (CET)
  - Summer (DST): UTC+2 (CEST)
- LAU 2: LU0000401
- Website: colmar-berg.lu

Colmar-Berg (German pronunciation: [ˈkɔlmaʁ ˈbɛʁk]; Luxembourgish: Colmer-Bierg) is a commune in central Luxembourg, in the canton of Mersch. It comprises the localities of Colmar and Berg, situated on either bank of the river Attert, as well as Welsdorf.

Colmar-Berg is the site of the Grand Duke of Luxembourg's principal residence, Berg Castle. It is also the site of a Goodyear tyre factory.

The commune was known as simply "Berg" until 25 March 1991.

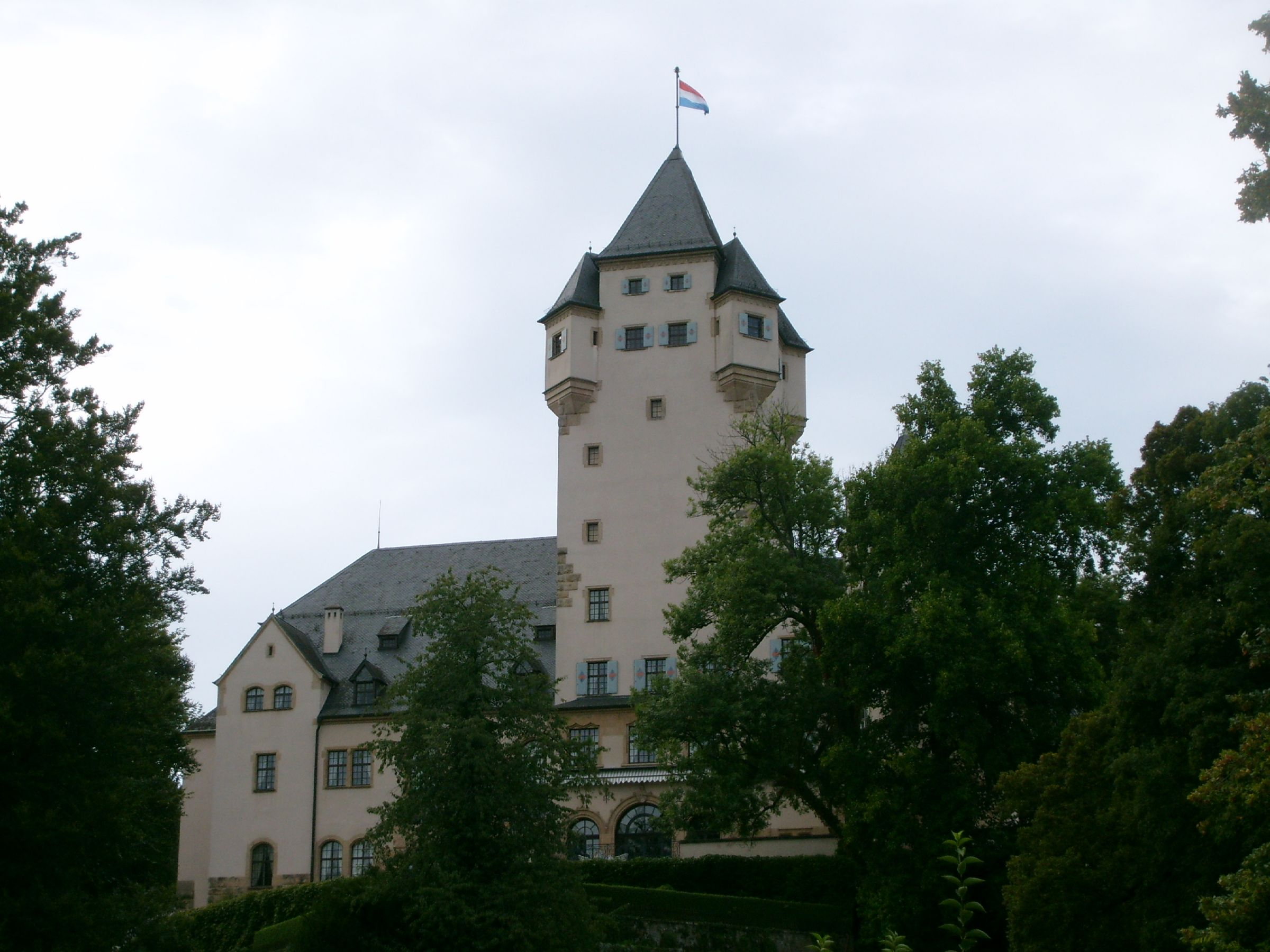
Berg Castle

Luxembourg's national drivers' training center (Centre de Formation pour Conducteurs) is also in Colmar-Berg. Each person receiving a driver's license in Luxembourg for the time is required to follow a day-long training course there between three months and two years after the obtention of their license in order to receive a permanent license.

== Population ==
Historical population

Year	Pop.	±%
1821	458	—
1851	578	+26.2%
1900	678	+17.3%
1910	644	−5.0%
1922	648	+0.6%
1935	608	−6.2%

Year	Pop.	±%
1947	572	−5.9%
1960	680	+18.9%
1970	935	+37.5%
1981	1,176	+25.8%
1990	1,332	+13.3%
2000	1,648	+23.7%

Year	Pop.	±%
2005	1,880	+14.1%
2010	1,948	+3.6%
2015	2,108	+8.2%
2020	2,192	+4.0%
2021	2,238	+2.1%

Source data

== Notable people ==
- Frantz Heldenstein (1892–1975), a Luxembourgish sculptor.
- Jean Kieffer (1909–1961), a Luxembourgish flyweight boxer; competed at the 1928 Summer Olympics

=== Aristocracy ===
- Marie-Adélaïde, Grand Duchess of Luxembourg (1894–1924), Grand Duchess of Luxembourg from 1912 to 1919.
- Charlotte, Grand Duchess of Luxembourg (1896–1985), Grand Duchess of Luxembourg from 1919 to 1964.
- Jean, Grand Duke of Luxembourg (1921–2019), the Grand Duke of Luxembourg from 1964 to 2000.
- Prince Charles of Luxembourg (1927–1977), younger son of Grand Duchess Charlotte and Prince Felix of Bourbon-Parma
