= Prince Charles of Luxembourg (1927–1977) =

Luxembourgish prince

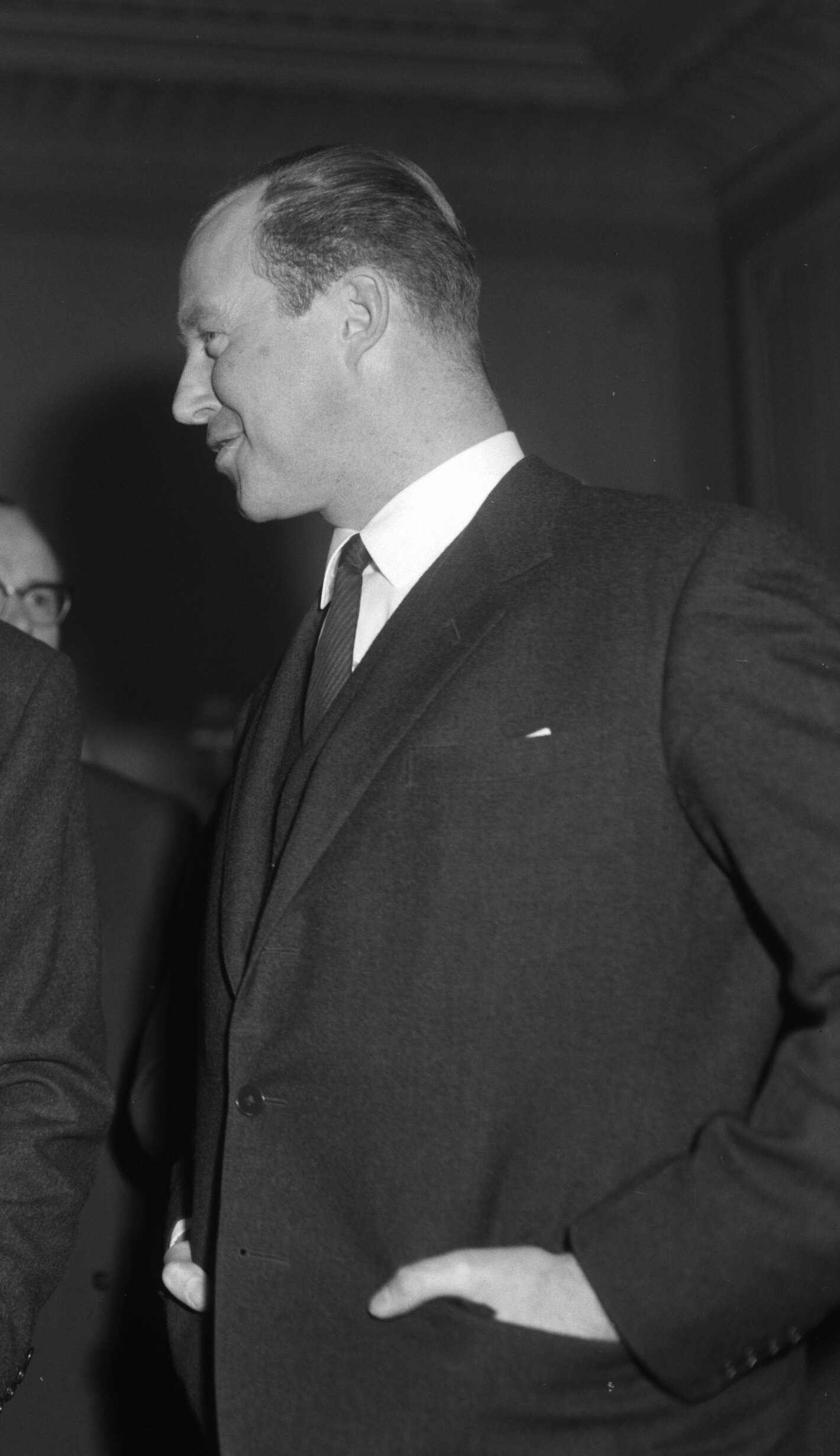
- Charles in 1964
- Born: 7 August 1927; Berg Castle, Luxembourg
- Died: 26 July 1977 (aged 49); Pistoia, Italy
- Burial: Notre-Dame Cathedral, Luxembourg City, Luxembourg
- Spouse: Joan Dillon (m. 1967)
- Issue: Princess Charlotte; Prince Robert
- House: Nassau-Weilburg (official); Bourbon-Parma (agnatic)
- Father: Prince Felix of Parma
- Mother: Charlotte, Grand Duchess of Luxembourg

Prince Charles of Luxembourg, Prince of Nassau, Prince of Bourbon-Parma (Charles Frédéric Louis Guillaume Marie; 7 August 1927 – 26 July 1977), was a younger son of Grand Duchess Charlotte I and Prince Felix.

== Education ==
He grew up at his mother's court in Luxembourg, until the German invasion on 10 May 1940 during World War II. The Grand Ducal Family of Luxembourg left the country to find refuge in Portugal, after receiving transit visas from the Portuguese consul Aristides de Sousa Mendes, in June 1940. They arrived at Vilar Formoso on 23 June 1940. After travelling through Coimbra and Lisbon, the family first stayed in Cascais, in Casa de Santa Maria, owned by Manuel Espírito Santo, who was then the honorary consul for Luxembourg in Portugal. By July they had moved to Monte Estoril, staying at the Chalet Posser de Andrade. On 10 July 1940, Prince Charles, together with his father Prince Félix, his siblings, Heir Prince Jean, Princess Elisabeth, Princess Marie Adelaide, princess Marie Gabriele and Princess Alix, the nanny Justine Reinard and the chauffeur Eugène Niclou, along with his wife Joséphine, boarded the S.S. Trenton headed for New York City.

The family eventually left the United States and moved to Canada, in exile in Montreal, where Prince Charles completed secondary school in Canada in the Collège Jean-de-Brébeuf in Montreal and the Collège Saint-Charles-Garnier in Quebec City. After World War II he undertook studies in Louvain, then at the Royal Military Academy at Aldershot.

== Career ==
After university, he returned to Luxembourg, where he worked to address national economic and social issues.

He inherited from his father Villa Pianore, an estate held by the Bourbon-Parma family in Italy (a large property located between Pietrasanta and Viareggio).

== Marriage and family ==
He married at St Edward the Confessor Church in Sutton Park, Guildford, Surrey, on 1 March 1967 Joan Douglas Dillon, daughter of U.S. Treasury Secretary C. Douglas Dillon and wife Phyllis Chess Ellsworth. As an unprecedented marriage between a prince of Luxembourg's reigning family and a commoner, Charles's brother, Grand Duke Jean, issued a decree to authorize the union as dynastic on 16 February 1967.

=== Children and descendants ===
Prince Charles and his wife Joan Dillon had two children, who are also princes of Luxembourg, Bourbon-Parma and Nassau:

- Princess Charlotte Phyllis Marie of Luxembourg (b. New York City, New York, 15 September 1967), married civilly in Mouchy on 26 June 1993 and religiously in Saint-Rémy-de-Provence on 18 September 1993 Marc-Victor Cunningham (b. Harrogate, 24 September 1965), son of Victor Cunningham and wife Karen Armitage, and has issue:
  - Charles Douglas Donnall Marie Cunningham (b. Rockport, Knox County, Maine, 8 August 1996)
  - Louis Robert Dominic Marie Cunningham (b. London, 10 March 1998), actor famous – as Louis Cunningham – for playing Lord Corning in Bridgerton and King Louis XVI in Marie Antoinette
  - Donnall Philippe Cunningham (b. 2002)
- Prince Robert Louis François Marie of Luxembourg (b. Fischbach Castle, 14 August 1968), an administrator of the French winery estate Chateau Haut-Brion. He married in Boston, Suffolk County, Massachusetts, on 29 January 1994 Julie Elizabeth Houston Ongaro (b. Louisville, Jefferson County, Kentucky, 9 June 1966), daughter of urologist and Harvard professor Dr. Theodore Ongaro and wife Katherine Houston. Their children, being born of a non-dynastically approved marriage, bore initially the titles of "Comte/Comtesse de Nassau". On 27 November 2004, Grand Duke Henri issued an Arrêté Grand-Ducal upgrading Julie and her issue to the titles of "Prince/Princesse de Nassau" with qualification of "Altesse Royale" (Royal Highness):
  - Princess Charlotte Katherine Justine Marie of Nassau (b. Boston, Suffolk County, Massachusetts, 20 March 1995), engaged in February 2024 with Mansour Shakarchi (born 1997 in Geneva), son of Marwan Shakarchi and Tanja Frick
  - Prince Alexandre Théodore Charles Marie of Nassau (b. Aix-en-Provence, 18 April 1997)
  - Prince Frederik Henri Douglas Marie of Nassau (b. Aix-en-Provence, 18 March 2002 – d. 1 March 2025)

== Death ==
Charles died of a heart attack in 1977 at the Villa Reale d'Imbarcati.
