= Ongaro =

Ongaro is an Italian surname. Notable people with the surname include:

- Alberto Ongaro (1925–2018), Italian journalist, writer and comics writer
- Alex Ongaro (born 1963), Canadian cyclist
- Easton Ongaro (born 1998), Canadian soccer player
- Fabio Ongaro (born 1977), Italian rugby player
- Ornella Ongaro (born 1990), French motorcycle racer
- Raimundo Ongaro (1924–2016), Argentine union leader
- Ross Ongaro (born 1959), Canadian soccer player
- Saúl Ongaro (1916–2004), Argentine footballer

== See also ==
- Francesco Dall'Ongaro (1808–1873), Italian writer, poet and dramatist
