= Prince Felix of Bourbon-Parma =

Prince consort of Luxembourg from 1919 to 1964

Félix of Bourbon-Parma
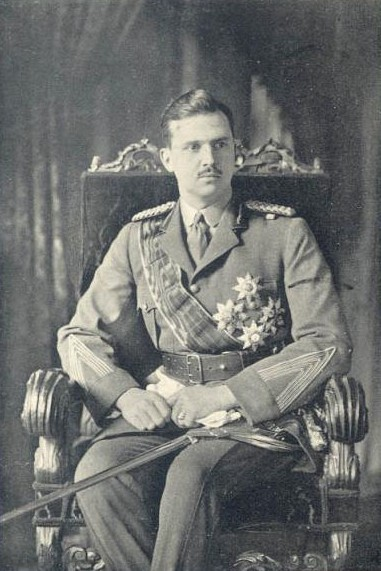
- 1926 portrait

Prince consort of Luxembourg
- Tenure: 6 November 1919 – 12 November 1964
- Born: 28 September 1893; Schwarzau am Steinfeld, Austria
- Died: 8 April 1970 (aged 76); Fischbach Castle, Luxembourg
- Burial: Notre-Dame Cathedral
- Spouse: Charlotte, Grand Duchess of Luxembourg (m. 1919)
- Issue: Jean, Grand Duke of Luxembourg; Princess Elisabeth, Duchess of Hohenberg; Princess Marie-Adélaide, Countess of Donnersmarck; Princess Marie-Gabrielle, Countess of Holstein-Ledreborg; Prince Charles; Alix, Princess of Ligne
Names
- Félix Marie Vincent
- House: Bourbon-Parma
- Father: Robert I, Duke of Parma
- Mother: Infanta Maria Antonia of Portugal

Prince Félix of Bourbon-Parma (later Prince Félix of Luxembourg; 28 September 1893 – 8 April 1970) was the husband of Charlotte, Grand Duchess of Luxembourg and the father of her six children, including her successor Jean, Grand Duke of Luxembourg. By birth to his father Robert I, Duke of Parma, he was a member of the House of Bourbon-Parma and a descendant of King Philip V of Spain. Prince Félix was the longest-serving consort of Luxembourg.

== Early life ==
Félix was one of the 24 children of the deposed Robert I, Duke of Parma, being the duke's sixth child and third son by his second wife, Maria Antonia of Portugal. His maternal grandparents were Miguel of Portugal and Adelaide of Löwenstein-Wertheim-Rosenberg. He was born in Schwarzau am Steinfeld.

He was also the younger brother (by sixteen months) of Empress Zita of Austria. Of the twelve children of Duke Robert's first marriage to Maria-Pia of the Two Sicilies, three died as infants, six had learning difficulties, and only three married. Despite the loss of his throne, Duke Robert and his family enjoyed considerable wealth, travelling in a private train of more than a dozen cars among his castles at Schwarzau am Steinfeld near Vienna, Villa Pianore in northwest Italy, and the magnificent Château de Chambord in France.

Less than four months after Robert's death in 1907 the grand marshal of the Austrian Court declared six of the children of his first marriage legally incompetent, at the behest of Duchess Maria Antonia. Nonetheless, Robert's primary heir was Elias, Duke of Parma, (1880–1959), the youngest son of the first marriage and the only one to father children of his own. Duke Elias also became the legal guardian of his six elder siblings. Although Félix's elder brothers, Prince Sixtus and Prince Xavier, eventually sued their half-brother Duke Elias to obtain a greater share of the ducal fortune, they lost in the French courts, leaving Félix with modest prospects.

During the Battle of Caporetto, Félix accompanied his brother-in-law Charles I of Austria, who had been visiting troops on the Italian front, on a return journey to Trieste. When they were crossing the Torre (river), the Emperor's car became stuck in the stream and it was deemed necessary to carry the Emperor to the river bank. However, the driver and aide-de-camp, who were carrying the Emperor, slipped and they were all caught in the current. Seeing this, Félix, along with several chauffeurs, jumped into the river and, with the help of some planks, brought the Emperor and others to shore.

Félix served in the Austrian Dragoons as Lieutenant and Captain, but resigned his commission in November 1918, when Austria-Hungary dissolved.

== Marriage to Grand Duchess Charlotte ==
On 6 November 1919 in Luxembourg, Félix married his first cousin Grand Duchess Charlotte of Luxembourg, having been admitted to the nobility of Luxembourg and also made Prince of Luxembourg by Grand Ducal decree the day before. Unlike some European consorts, Félix neither adopted his wife's dynastic surname (of Nassau), nor relinquished his own title and name "Prince of Bourbon-Parma". His traditional style as a Bourbon prince of the Parmesan branch is the reason that cadet members of the Grand Ducal Family of Luxembourg enjoy the style of Royal Highness (but separately that style belongs to the Luxembourg monarch and heir apparent by right, as the historical prerogative of grand-ducal dynasties).

Felix was president of the Luxembourg Red Cross between 1923 and 1932 and again between 1947 and 1969. He was also Colonel of the Luxembourg Volunteers Company since 1920 and Inspector-General of the Luxembourg Army between 1945 and 1967.

Urban legend has it that Félix lost the Grünewald, a forest owned by the Grand Duchess, at a casino in 1934, but this is false; part of the property was sold, along with Berg Castle, to the Luxembourgish government, with the revenue paying for the upkeep of the grand-ducal household, and was not spent on personal consumption, let alone gambling losses.

During World War II the grand ducal family left Luxembourg shortly before the arrival of Nazi troops, settling in France until the capitulation, in June 1940. Subsequently, the family and the Grand Duchess' ministers received transit visas to Portugal from the Portuguese consul Aristides de Sousa Mendes, in June 1940. They arrived at Vilar Formoso on 23 June 1940. After travelling through Coimbra and Lisbon, the family first stayed in Cascais, in Casa de Santa Maria, owned by Manuel Espírito Santo, who was then the honorary consul for Luxembourg in Portugal. By July they had moved to Monte Estoril, staying at the Chalet Posser de Andrade. On 10 July 1940, Félix, together with his children, Hereditary Grand Duke Jean, Princess Elisabeth, Princess Marie Adelaide, Princess Marie Gabriele, Prince Charles and Princess Alix, the nanny Justine Reinard and the chauffeur Eugène Niclou, along with his wife Joséphine, boarded the S.S. Trenton headed for New York City, after which they moved to Canada.

== Death ==
Félix died at Fischbach Castle on 8 April 1970. His funeral mass was held at the Cathedral of Notre-Dame and he was later buried in the crypt of the cathedral.

== Marriage and children ==
On 6 November 1919 in Luxembourg, he married Charlotte, Grand Duchess of Luxembourg. They had six children:

- Jean, Grand Duke of Luxembourg (1921–2019), who married HRH Princess Joséphine-Charlotte of Belgium (1927–2005), and had issue.
- Princess Elisabeth of Luxembourg (1922–2011), who married HSH Franz, Duke of Hohenberg (1927–1977), and had issue.
- Princess Marie Adelaide of Luxembourg (1924–2007), who married Count Karl Josef Henckel von Donnersmarck (1928–2008), and had issue.
- Princess Marie Gabrielle of Luxembourg (1925–2023), who married Knud Johan, Count of Holstein-Ledreborg (1919–2001), and had issue.
- Prince Charles of Luxembourg (1927–1977), who married Joan Douglas Dillon (born 1935), the former wife of James Brady Moseley, and had issue.
- Princess Alix of Luxembourg (1929–2019), who married HH Antoine, 13th Prince of Ligne (1925–2005), and had issue.

== Honours and awards ==
=== Honours ===
National

- Luxembourg: Knight of the Order of the Gold Lion of the House of Nassau
- Luxembourg: President of the Luxembourg Red Cross
- (Duchy of Parma) Parmese Ducal Family: Grand Cross of the Order of St. Louis for Civil Merit

Foreign

- Kingdom of Albania Knight Grand Cross of the Order of Fidelity (1931)
- (Austrian Empire) (Kingdom of Hungary) Austro-Hungarian Imperial and Royal Family: Grand Cross of the Royal Hungarian Order of St. Stephen (1917)
- Belgium: Grand Cordon of the Order of Leopold
- Netherlands: Grand Cross of the Order of the Netherlands Lion
- Norway: Grand Cross of the Royal Norwegian Order of St. Olav (1964)
- Portugal: Grand Cross of the Military Order of St. Benedict of Aviz (24 February 1950)
- Sweden: Knight of the Royal Order of the Seraphim (18 July 1951)
- Thailand: Knight of the Order of the Royal House of Chakri (17 October 1960)

== Footnotes and references ==
Prince Felix of Bourbon-Parma House of Bourbon-Parma Cadet branch of the House of Bourbon Born: 28 October 1893 Died: 31 July 1942
Luxembourgish royalty
| Vacant Title last held by Infanta Marie Anne of Portugal as grand duchess | Prince consort of Luxembourg; 1919–1964 | Succeeded by Princess Joséphine-Charlotte of Belgium as grand duchess |
