= Charlotte, Grand Duchess of Luxembourg =

Grand Duchess of Luxembourg from 1919 to 1964

Charlotte
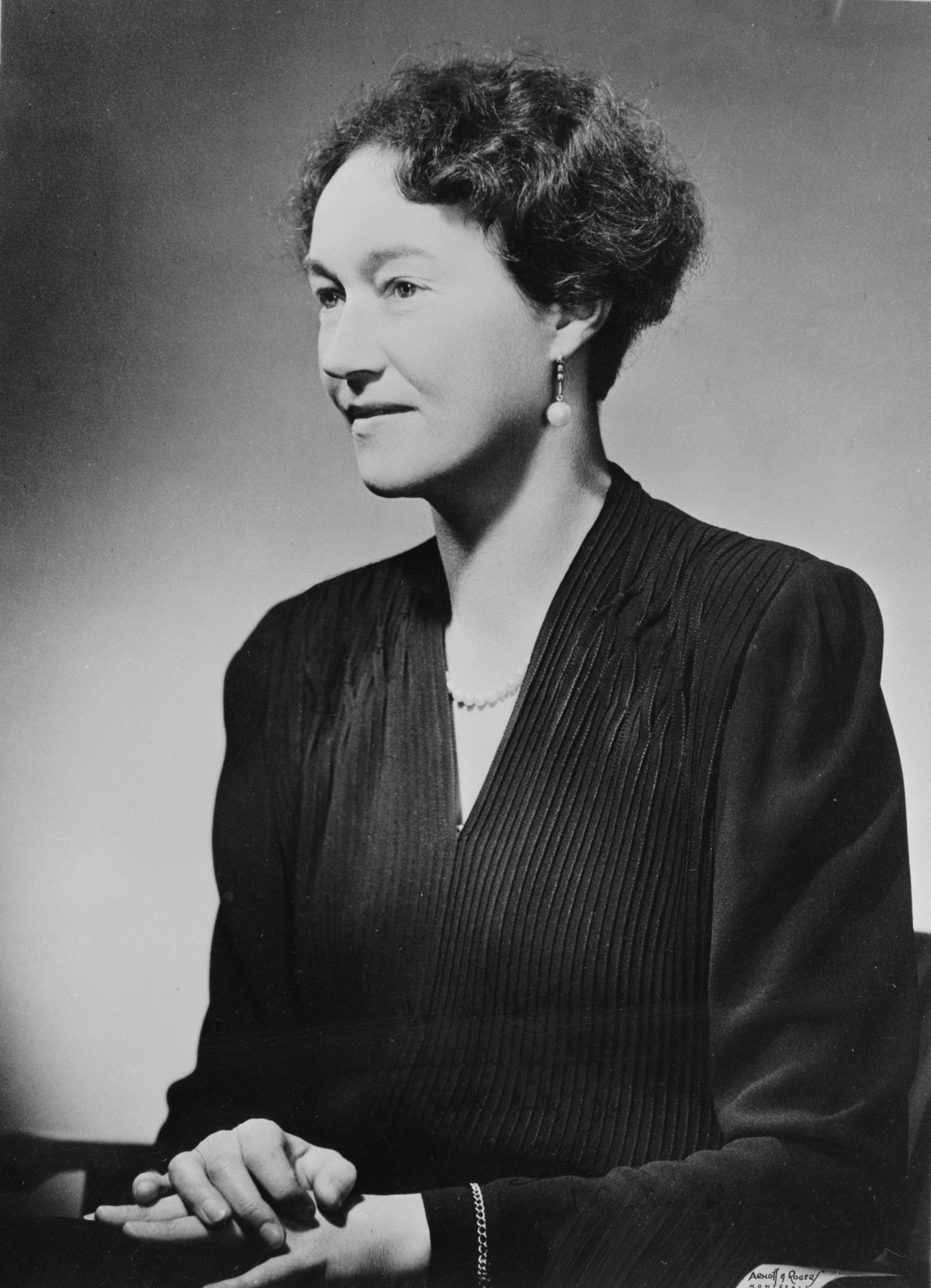
- Charlotte in 1942

Grand Duchess of Luxembourg
- Reign: 14 January 1919 – 12 November 1964
- Predecessor: Marie-Adélaïde
- Successor: Jean
- Regent: Jean (1961–1964)
- Born: 23 January 1896; Berg Castle, Luxembourg
- Died: 9 July 1985 (aged 89); Fischbach Castle, Fischbach, Luxembourg
- Burial: Notre-Dame Cathedral
- Spouse: Prince Félix of Bourbon-Parma (m. 1919; died 1970)
- Issue: Jean, Grand Duke of Luxembourg; Princess Elisabeth, Duchess of Hohenberg; Princess Marie Adelaide; Princess Marie Gabrielle, Countess of Holstein-Ledreborg; Prince Charles; Alix, Princess of Ligne
Names
- Charlotte Adelgonde Elisabeth Marie Wilhelmine
- House: Nassau-Weilburg
- Father: William IV, Grand Duke of Luxembourg
- Mother: Infanta Marie Anne of Portugal

Charlotte (Charlotte Adelgonde Elisabeth Marie Wilhelmine; 23 January 1896 – 9 July 1985) was Grand Duchess of Luxembourg from 14 January 1919 until her abdication on 12 November 1964. Her reign is the longest of any Luxembourgish monarch since 1815 when the country was elevated to a Grand Duchy.

She acceded to the throne on 14 January 1919 following the abdication of her sister, Marie-Adélaïde, due to political pressure over Marie-Adélaïde's role during the German occupation of Luxembourg during World War I. A referendum retained the monarchy with Charlotte as Grand Duchess regnant.

She married Prince Felix of Bourbon-Parma on 6 November 1919. They had six children. Following the 1940 German invasion of Luxembourg during World War II, Charlotte went into exile: first in France, then Portugal, Great Britain, and North America. While in Britain, she made broadcasts to the people of Luxembourg. She returned to Luxembourg in April 1945.

She abdicated in 1964, and was succeeded by her son, Jean, later dying from cancer on 9 July 1985. She was the last agnatic member of the House of Nassau, and the last personal recipient of the Golden Rose. Since her death, there are no living personal recipients of that honour, which in modern times has been awarded by the Pope only to churches and shrines. She is to date the most recent Grand Duchess of Luxembourg in her own right.

== Early life and tenure as Grand Duchess ==
Private portrait, 1921

Born in Berg Castle, Charlotte of Nassau-Weilburg, Princess of Luxembourg, was the second daughter of Grand Duke William IV and his wife, Marie Anne of Portugal.

Her older sister, Marie-Adélaide, had succeeded their father. However, Marie-Adélaïde's actions had become controversial, and she was seen as sympathetic to the German occupation of Luxembourg during World War I. There were calls in parliament for her abdication, and she was forced to abdicate in favour of Charlotte on 14 January 1919.

Luxembourg adopted a new constitution that year. In a referendum on 28 September 1919, 77.8% of the Luxembourgish people voted for the continuation of the monarchy with Grand Duchess Charlotte as head of state. However, in the new constitution, the powers of the monarch were severely restricted, thus codifying actual practices dating from the end of the personal union with the Netherlands in 1890.

== Reign ==
By 1935, Charlotte had sold her German properties, the former residential palaces of the Dukes of Nassau, Biebrich Palace and Schloss Weilburg, to the State of Prussia. During World War II the grand ducal family left Luxembourg shortly before the arrival of Nazi troops. Luxembourg's neutrality was violated on 9 May 1940, while the Grand Duchess and her family were in residence at Colmar-Berg. That day she called an extraordinary meeting of her leading ministers, and they all decided to place themselves under the protection of France, described by the Grand Duchess as a difficult but necessary decision. Initially the family took up residence at the Château de Montastruc in south-western France, but the rapid advance of the German forces into France followed by French capitulation the next month caused the French government to refuse any guarantee of security to the exiled Luxembourg government. Permission was received to cross Spain provided they did not stop en route, and the Grand Duchess with her ministers moved on to Portugal.

The Germans proposed to restore the Grand Duchess to her functions, but Charlotte refused, mindful of her sister's experiences of remaining in Luxembourg under German occupation during the First World War. By 29 August 1940 Grand Duchess Charlotte was in London where she began to make supportive broadcasts to her homeland using the BBC. Later she travelled to the United States and to Canada. Her children continued their schooling in Montreal and Quebec City while she had several meetings with President Roosevelt who encouraged her itinerant campaigning across the country in support of his own opposition to isolationism which was a powerful political current until the Pearl Harbor attacks. In the meantime Luxembourg, along with the adjacent French Moselle department, found itself integrated into an expanded Germany under the name Heim ins Reich, which left Luxembourgers required to speak German and liable for conscription into the German army.

In 1943 Grand Duchess Charlotte and the Luxembourg government established themselves in London: her broadcasts became a more regular feature of the BBC schedules, establishing her as a focus for the resistance movements in Luxembourg.

Charlotte's younger sister Antonia and brother-in-law Rupprecht, Crown Prince of Bavaria, were exiled from Germany in 1939. In 1944, living now in Hungary, Crown Princess Antonia was captured when the Germans invaded Hungary and found herself deported to the concentration camp at Dachau, being later transferred to Flossenbürg where she survived torture but only with her health badly impaired. Meanwhile, from 1942 Grand Duchess Charlotte's eldest son, Jean, served as a volunteer in the British Army's Irish Guards, after the war becoming its Honorary Colonel-in-chief (1984–2000).

The Grand Dutchess in 1945 thanks the US in a speech.

In the years after the war, Charlotte showed a lot of public activity which contributed to raising Luxembourg's profile on the international stage, by hosting visits from foreign heads of state and other dignitaries, such as Eleanor Roosevelt (1950), Queen Juliana of the Netherlands (1951), René Coty (1957), King Baudouin of Belgium (1959), King Bhumibol of Thailand (1961), and King Olav V of Norway (1964). Likewise, she visited Pope Pius XII (1950), Charles de Gaulle (1961), and John F. Kennedy (1963). Together with her husband and their children Jean and Elisabeth, she took part in the ship tour organized by Queen Frederica and her husband King Paul of Greece in 1954, which became known as the "Cruise of the Kings" and was attended by over 100 royals from all over Europe.

In 1951 Charlotte and her prime minister Pierre Dupong admitted by decree three Swedish relatives into the nobility of Luxembourg who were not allowed to use their birth titles in Sweden. They were then named as Sigvard Prince Bernadotte, Carl Johan Prince Bernadotte and Lennart Prince Bernadotte and also, with their legitimate descendants, were given the hereditary titles of Counts and Countesses of Wisborg there. The formal document emphasizes Charlotte's and Dupong's wishes that the Princes and Princesses Bernadotte be recognized and their titles respected.

== Abdication and later life ==
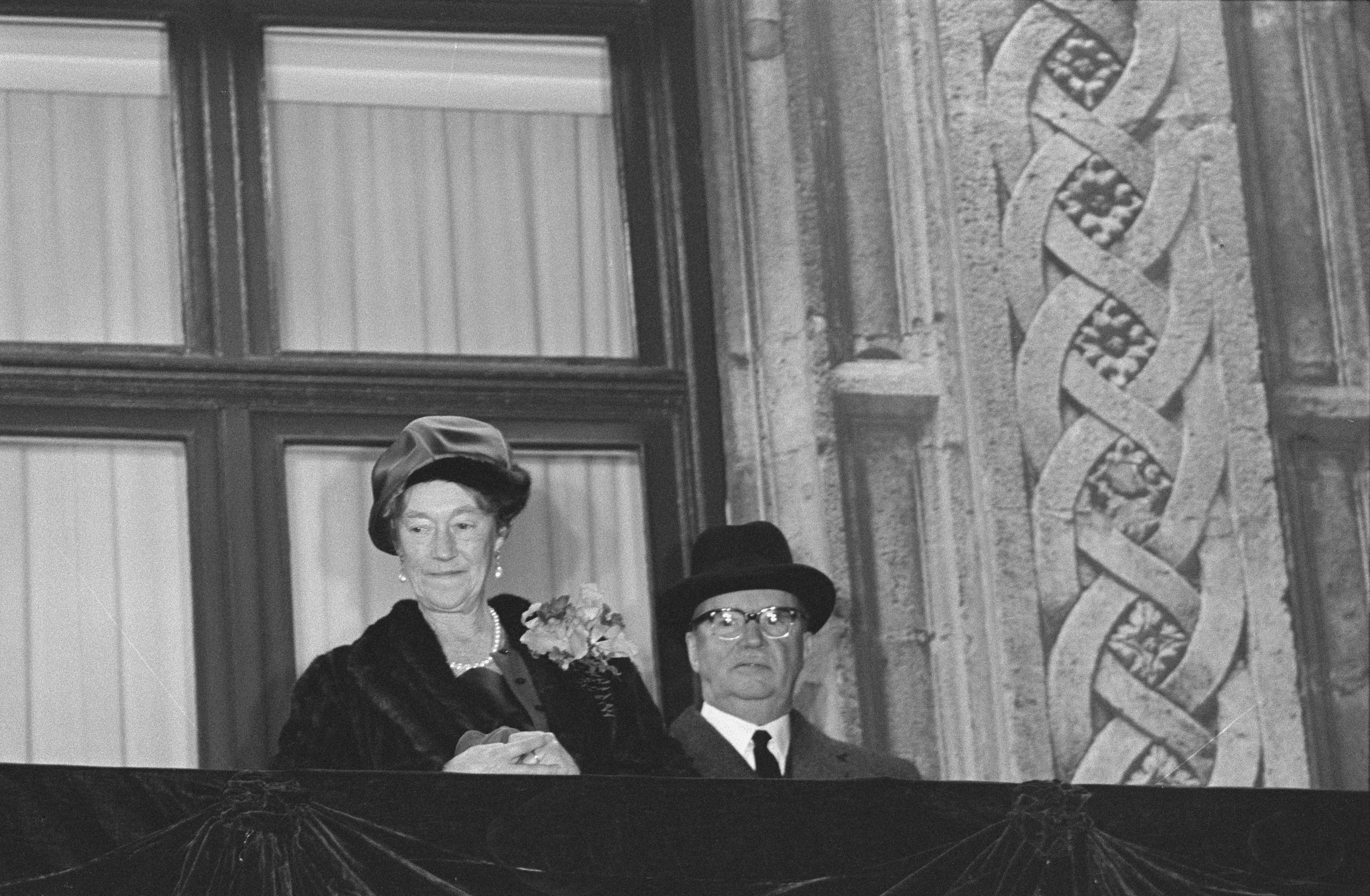
Charlotte of Luxembourg and Prince Felix before her abdication, 11 November 1964

On 12 November 1964, she abdicated in favour of her son Jean, who then reigned until his abdication in 2000.

Charlotte died at Fischbach Castle on 9 July 1985, from cancer. She was interred in the Ducal Crypt of the Notre-Dame Cathedral in the city of Luxembourg.

A statue of the Grand Duchess is in Place Clarefontaine in the city of Luxembourg.

== Marriage and children ==
On 6 November 1919 in Luxembourg, she married Prince Felix of Bourbon-Parma, a first cousin on her mother's side. (Both Charlotte and Felix were grandchildren of King Miguel of Portugal, through his daughters Maria Anna and Maria Antonia, respectively). With the marriage, their lineal descent was raised in style from Grand Ducal Highness to Royal Highness.

The couple had six children:

- Jean, Grand Duke of Luxembourg (1921–2019), who married HRH Princess Joséphine-Charlotte of Belgium (1927–2005) and had issue.
- Princess Elisabeth of Luxembourg (1922–2011), who married HSH Franz, Duke of Hohenberg (1927–1977) and had issue.
- Princess Marie Adelaide of Luxembourg (1924–2007), who married Count Karl Josef Henckel von Donnersmarck (1928–2008) and had issue.
- Princess Marie Gabrielle of Luxembourg (1925–2023), who married Knud Johan, Count of Holstein-Ledreborg (1919–2001) and had issue.
- Prince Charles of Luxembourg (1927–1977), who married Joan Douglas Dillon (born 1935), the former wife of James Brady Moseley, and had issue.
- Princess Alix of Luxembourg (1929–2019), who married HH Antoine, 13th Prince of Ligne (1925–2005), and had issue.

== Honours ==
National honours

- Luxembourg:
  - Knight of the Order of the Gold Lion of the House of Nassau
  - Recipient of the Luxembourg War Cross

Foreign honours

- (Albanian Kingdom (1928–1939)) Albanian Royal Family: Grand Cross of the Royal Order of Fidelity (1931)
- Austria
  - (Austrian Empire) Austrian Imperial and Royal Family: Dame of the Order of the Starry Cross
  - Austrian Republic: Grand Cross of the Decoration for Services to the Republic of Austria
- Denmark: Knight of the Order of the Elephant – 21 March 1955
- France: Grand Cross of the Legion of Honour – 22 June 1923
- Holy See:
  - Dame Grand Cross of the Order of Pius IX
  - Cross of Honour of the "Pro Ecclesia et Pontifice"
  - The Golden Rose
- Italy:
  - (Duchy of Parma) Parmese Royal Family: Dame Grand Cross of the Sacred Military Constantinian Order of Saint George
- Monaco: Knight Grand Cross of the Order of Saint-Charles – 20 January 1949
- Netherlands: Knight Grand Cross of the Order of the Lion of the Netherlands
- Norway: Grand Cross with Collar of the Order of St. Olav – 1964
- Portugal:
  - Grand Cross of the Order of the Tower and Sword – 29 September 1933
  - Grand Cross of the Sash of the Two Orders – 23 January 1949
- Spain: Dame Grand Cross of the Order of Carlos III
- Sweden: Member with Collar of the Order of the Seraphim – 14 April 1939
- Thailand: Dame of the Order of the Royal House of Chakri – 17 October 1965

== Gallery ==
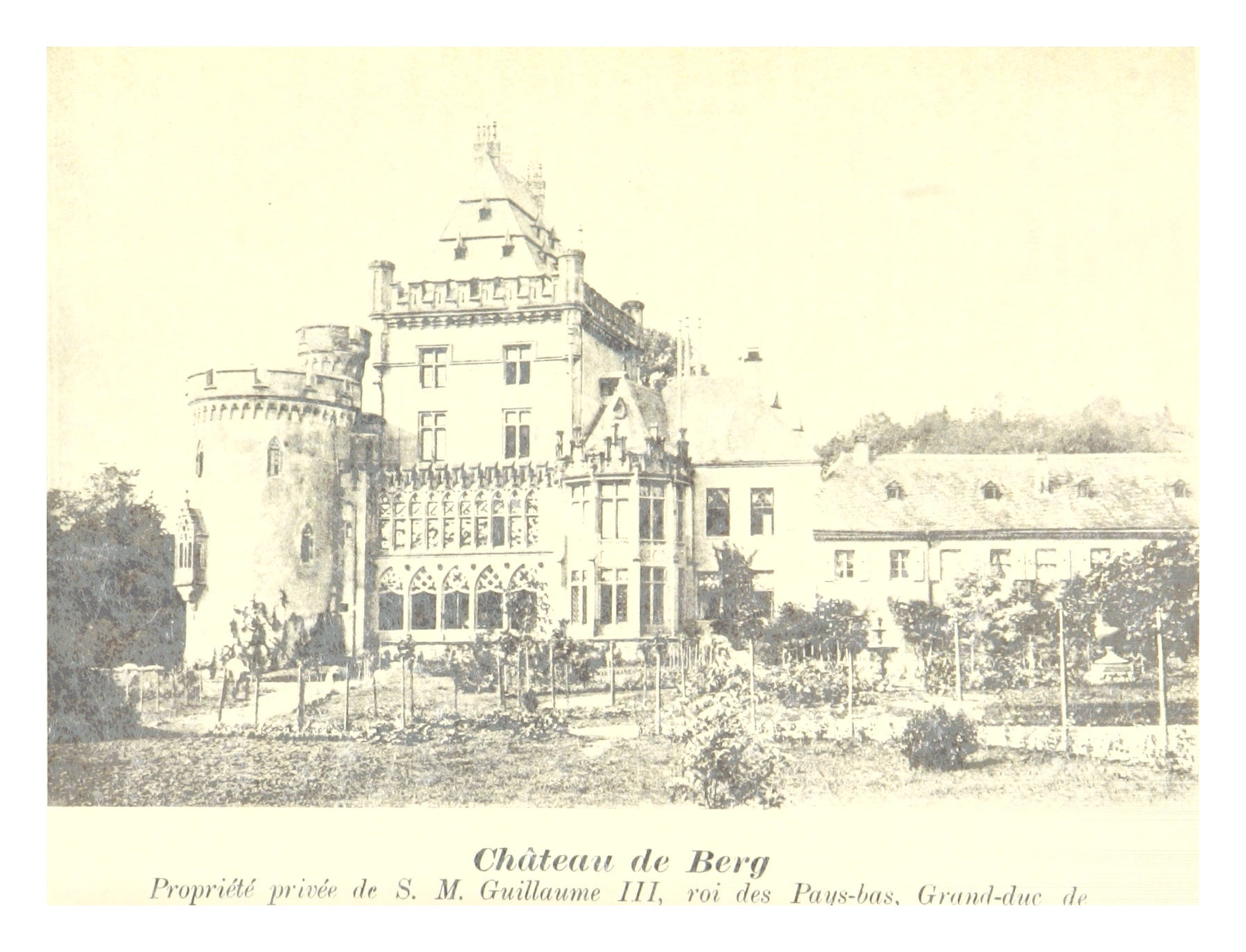
The old Berg Castle (demolished in 1906), where Charlotte was born

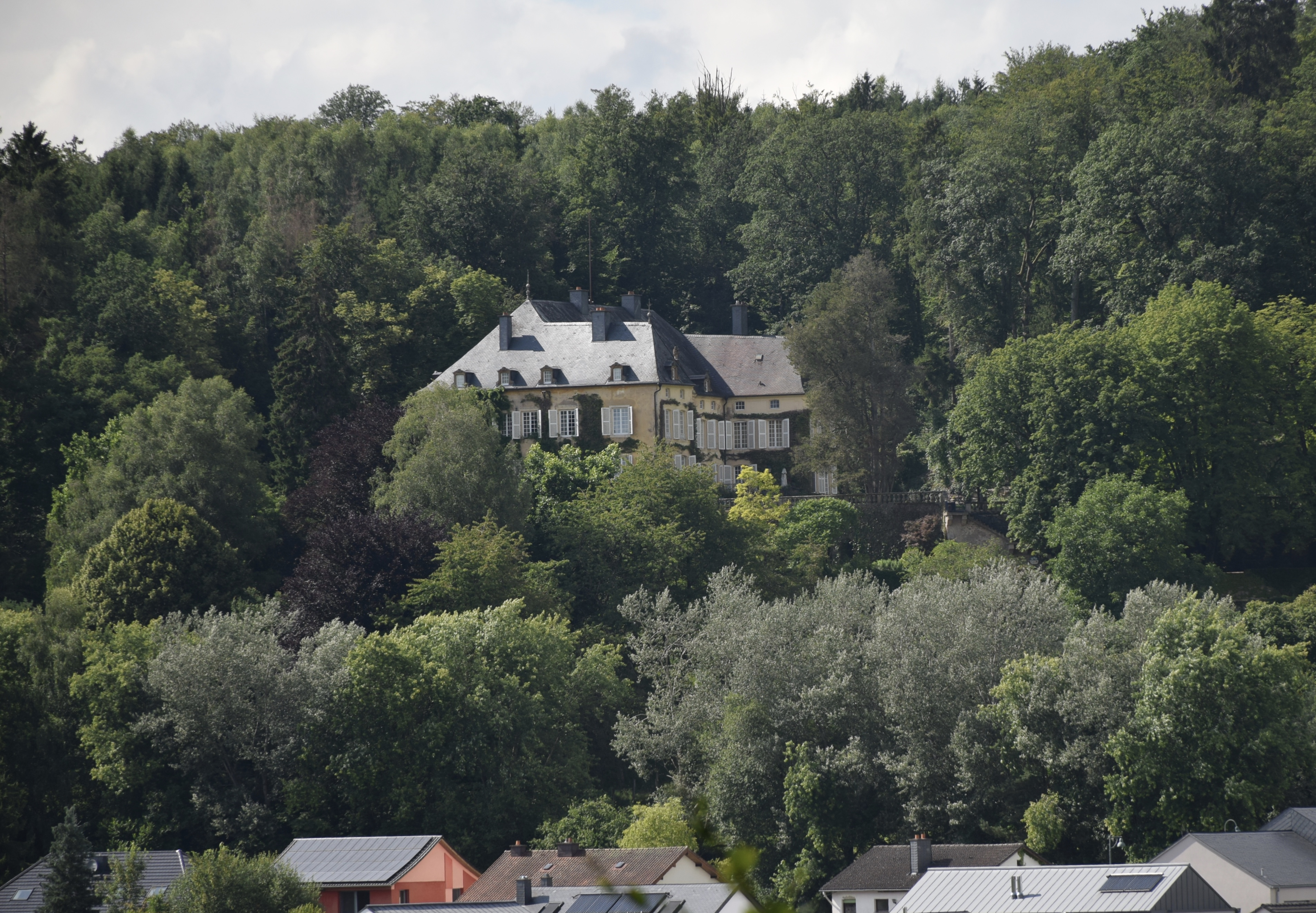
Fischbach Castle, Charlotte's residence after her abdication, and where she died

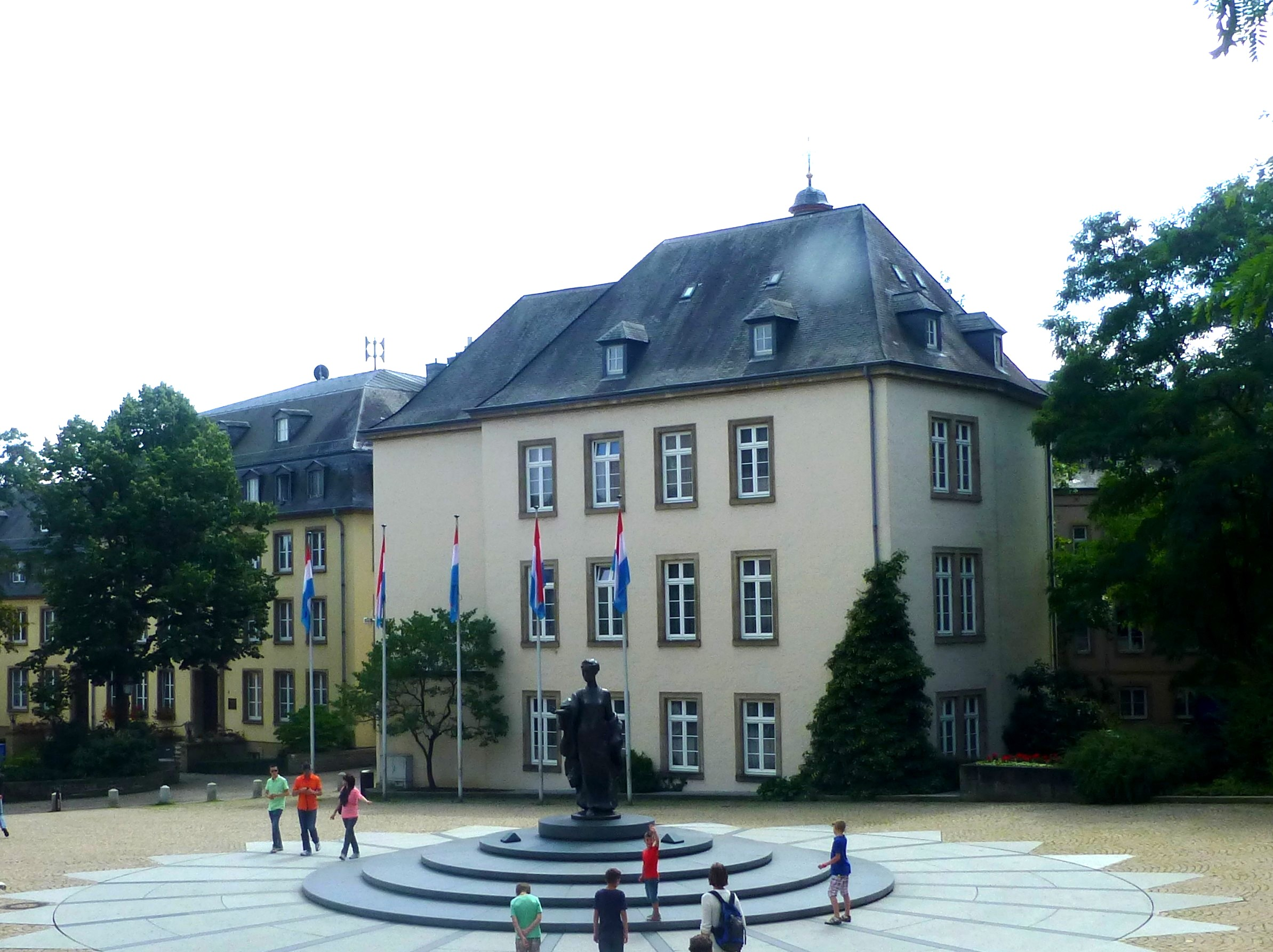
Statue of Grand Duchess Charlotte on Place Clairefontaine

Charlotte, Grand Duchess of Luxembourg House of Nassau-Weilburg Cadet branch of the House of Nassau Born: 23 January 1896 Died: 6 July 1985
Regnal titles
Preceded by Marie-Adélaïde	Grand Duchess of Luxembourg; 1919–1964	Succeeded by Jean
Titles in pretence
Preceded by Marie-Adélaïde	— TITULAR — Duchess of Nassau; 1919–1964; Reason for succession failure: Prussian annexation of Nassau in 1866	Succeeded by Jean
