= Fischbach Castle =

Castle in Luxembourg

Coordinates: 49.74765°N 6.18657°E

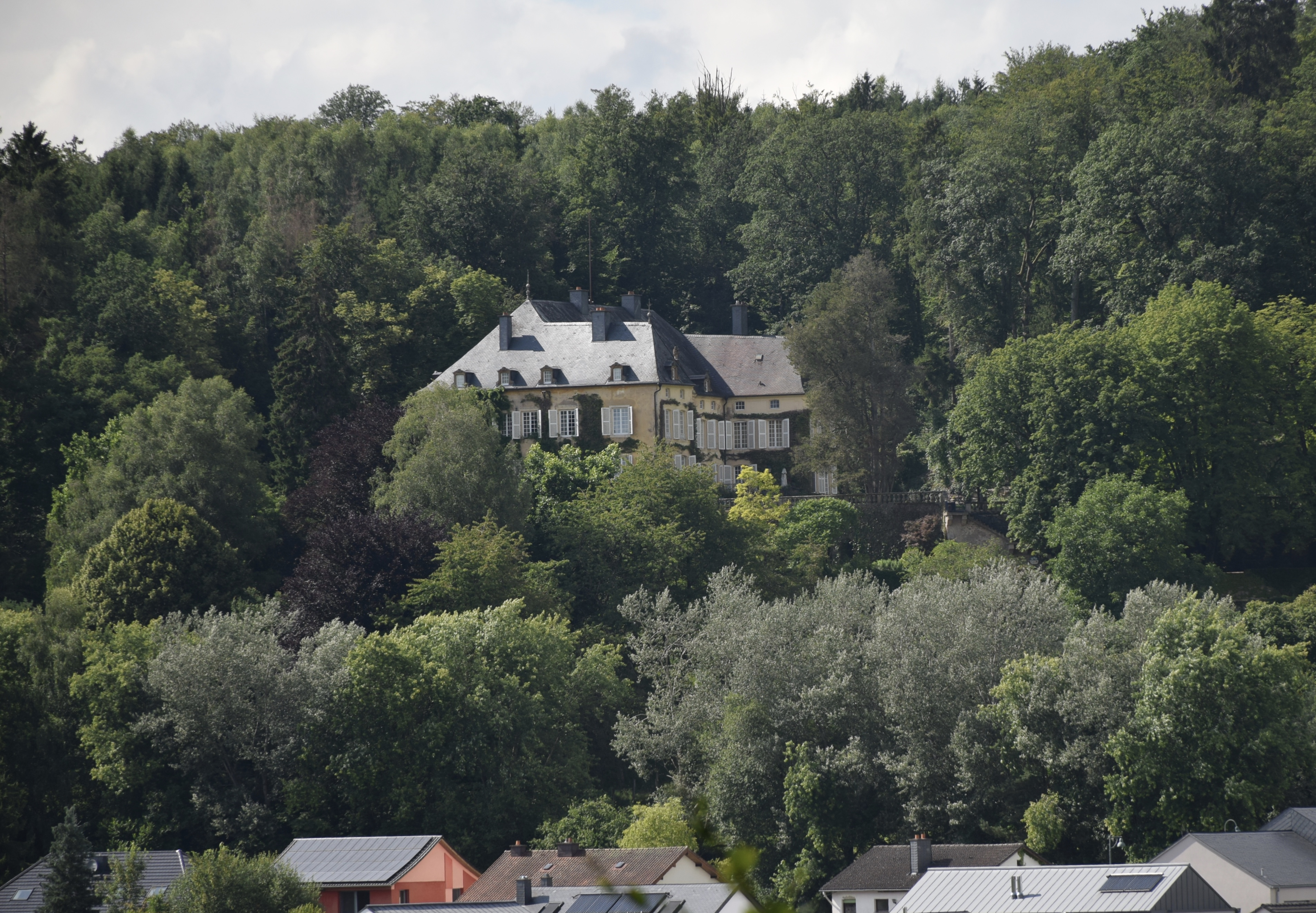
Fischbach Castle in 2021

Fischbach Castle (Luxembourgish: Schlass Fëschbech, French: Château de Fischbach, German: Schloss Fischbach) is a castle in Luxembourg. It is situated near the town of Fischbach, in central Luxembourg.

== History ==
Fischbach has the longest history of any of Luxembourg's castles. The Abbey of Echternach, the wealthiest institution in Luxembourg for centuries, was the first owner of the estate of Fischbach. Records show the first liege independent of the Church took possession of the castle in 1050. The castle underwent several renovations and alterations, including complete destruction in 1635, during the Thirty Years' War.

During the second quarter of the 19th century, industrialist and metallurgist Auguste Garnier owned the castle and turned the estate into an industrial centre by constructing blast furnaces there. Grand Duke William II was the first head of state to own the castle in 1847, when he bought the estate to consolidate his political control of Luxembourg and to placate the local populace after the Belgian Revolution. He immediately ordered the demolition of Garnier's blast furnaces.

In 1884, Duke Adolphe of Nassau, who would become Grand Duke of Luxembourg when the personal union of the Netherlands and Luxembourg ended in 1890, bought Fischbach Castle from Grand Duke William III.

During the Nazi occupation of the Second World War, Fischbach served as a rest home for German artists, calling it Künstlerheim Fischbach. Despite this designation, Fischbach did not avoid the looting of art and historic artefacts that befell other palaces in Luxembourg. However, unlike the other palaces, it was not renovated or partly demolished to suit the Nazis' intentions, leaving it habitable by Grand Duchess Charlotte upon her return from exile.

Due to the unsuitability of the other royal palaces, Charlotte continued to live at Fischbach after the war, and took a liking to the place. Even after the full restoration of Berg Castle and the Grand Ducal Palace, Grand Duchess Charlotte lived at Fischbach for the rest of her reign. Indeed, even after she abdicated, in 1964, she remained at Fischbach until her death in 1985. Two years after Charlotte's death, Prince Henri and Princess Maria Teresa moved into the castle, where they lived until Henri succeeded his father, Jean, as Grand Duke, in 2000. Grand Duke Jean lived at Fischbach until his death on 23 April 2019. Then-Hereditary Grand Duke Guillaume and Hereditary Grand Duchess Stéphanie moved into Fischbach Castle in late 2019 upon returning to Luxembourg after living in London for one year. Following Guillaume's accession to the throne, they, along with their sons Prince Charles and Prince François, are due to move to a newly built cottage on the grounds of Berg Castle in 2026, at which point the castle will once again be the residence of Henri and Maria Teresa.

== See also ==
- List of castles in Luxembourg
