= Berg Castle =

- Schlass Bierg
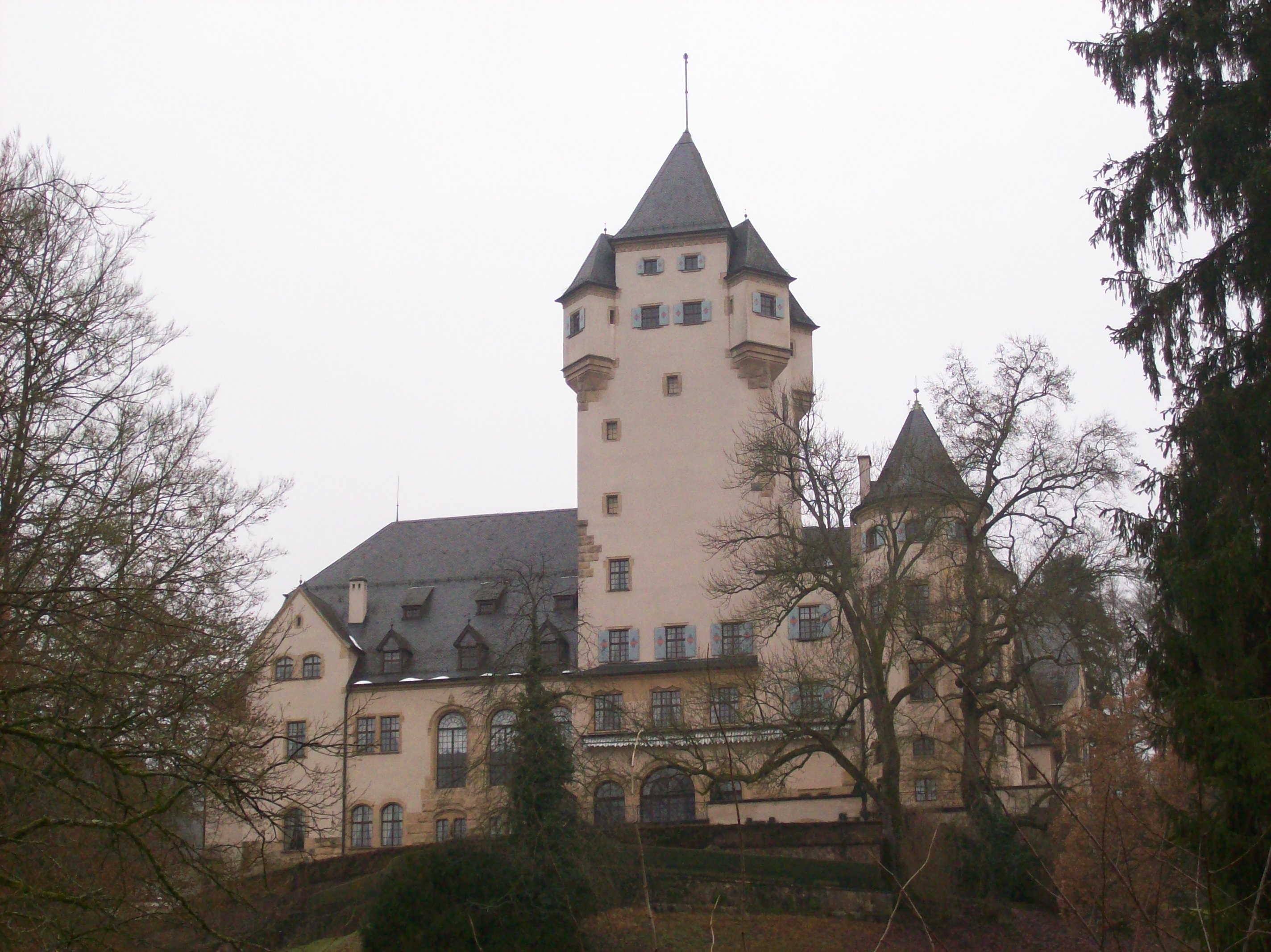
- Principal residence of the Grand Ducal family

- Location within Luxembourg

General information
- Type: Castle
- Location: Colmar-Berg, Luxembourg
- Coordinates: 49.814666°N 6.087595°E
- Construction started: 1907
- Completed: 1911

Design and construction
- Architects: Max Ostenrieder and Pierre Funck-Eydt

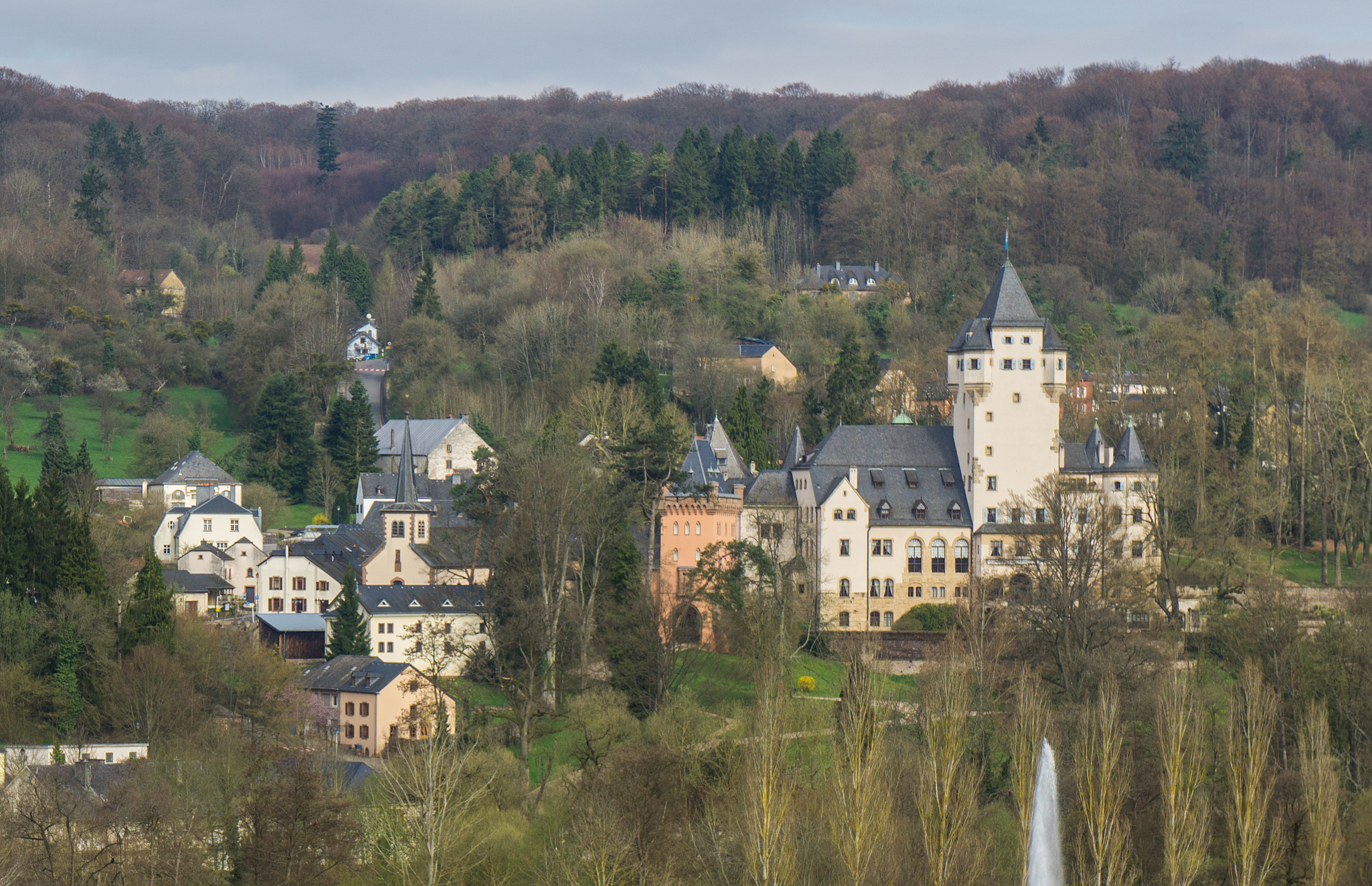
View of Berg Castle and its surroundings

Berg Castle (Luxembourgish: Schlass Bierg, pronounced [ˈʃlɑs ˈbiːɐ̯ɕ]; French: Château de Berg; German: Schloss Berg) is the principal residence of the Grand Duke of Luxembourg. It is situated in the town of Colmar-Berg, in central Luxembourg, near the confluence of the Alzette and the Attert, two of Luxembourg's most important rivers.

== History ==
The estate at Colmar-Berg first came into the possession of the Grand Dukes of Luxembourg in 1845. The Belgian Revolution had divided Luxembourg from the Netherlands, and also into two, undermining Dutch control of the fortress of Luxembourg City. Grand Duke William II sought to establish a suitable Grand Ducal residence in Luxembourg, hoping that a division of his time between The Hague and Luxembourg would placate the local, overwhelmingly Roman Catholic, population. To this end, the Grand Duke bought Berg Castle from the Pasquier estate. In 1848, it was recognised as the exclusive home of the Grand Duke by the newly promulgated constitution.

In 1890, the Royal house of the Netherlands and the Grand Ducal house of Luxembourg diverged, and the new Grand Duke, Adolphe, purchased Berg Castle the following year, in order to maintain the Grand Ducal estate at Colmar-Berg. In 1906, William IV had the old castle demolished and a new one constructed in its place, designed by the Munich-based architect Max Ostenrieder and the local Pierre Funck-Eydt. Work on the new castle began in 1907, and was completed on 9 September 1911, after which it became the primary residence of the Grand Ducal family.

During the Great Depression, the Grand Ducal family fell upon hard times. Grand Duchess Charlotte sought an agreement with the government of Luxembourg under which the Grand Duchy might divest personal properties to the government, which would then allow the Grand Ducal family to use them as official residences. In 1934, such an arrangement was reached on Berg Castle, with the castle changing hands (along with much of the Grünewald forest). The two properties changed hands for 40m francs, of which 20m francs were denoted for the castle; this was viewed by the government as an undervaluation (as was the price of the Grünewald), as they had assessed the castle as being worth 22m francs. Berg is now one of two properties covered by similar agreements (the other being the Grand Ducal Palace in Luxembourg City). The right of Grand Dukes to reside at these two residences is enshrined in Article 44 of the Constitution of Luxembourg.

During the Second World War, the castle was occupied by Nazi Germany. During this period, the most valuable works of art were stolen from the castle, and the building itself underwent major alterations to suit the Nazis' purpose of re-educating local girls. After the war, the restoration of the castle took several years, and it was only re-occupied by the Grand Ducal family in 1964, when Grand Duke Jean acceded to the throne. Until then, the Grand Duchess resided in Fischbach Castle, although this was mostly out of preference, rather than necessity.

In July 2024, then-Hereditary Grand Duke Guillaume announced plans to build a "family-friendly" cottage on the castle's grounds to serve as a residence for his family after his accession to the throne, leaving the possibility for the castle itself to be periodically open to the public in the future. Works began in May 2025 and are due to last until 2027. Now Grand Duke Guillaume V has stated plans to move to the castle itself temporarily in 2026 while the cottage finishes construction; until then, it remains the residence of former Grand Duke Henri and Grand Duchess Maria Teresa, while the new grand ducal couple remains at Fischbach Castle with their children.

== Births ==
Three of the past five monarchs of Luxembourg were born at Berg Castle:

- Grand Duchess Marie-Adélaïde (born 1894; reigned 1912–19)
- Grand Duchess Charlotte (born 1896; reigned 1919–64)
- Grand Duke Jean (born 1921; reigned 1964–2000)

Grand Duke Henri (born 1955; reigned 2000-2025) was born at Betzdorf Castle, in eastern Luxembourg, while Grand Duke Guillaume V (born 1981; reigning since 2025) was born at Grand Duchess Charlotte Maternity Hospital in Luxembourg City.

== See also ==
- List of castles in Luxembourg
