= 35th Chamber of Deputies of Luxembourg =

Chamber of Deputies from 2023 Luxembourg general election

35th Chamber of Deputies
←	34th
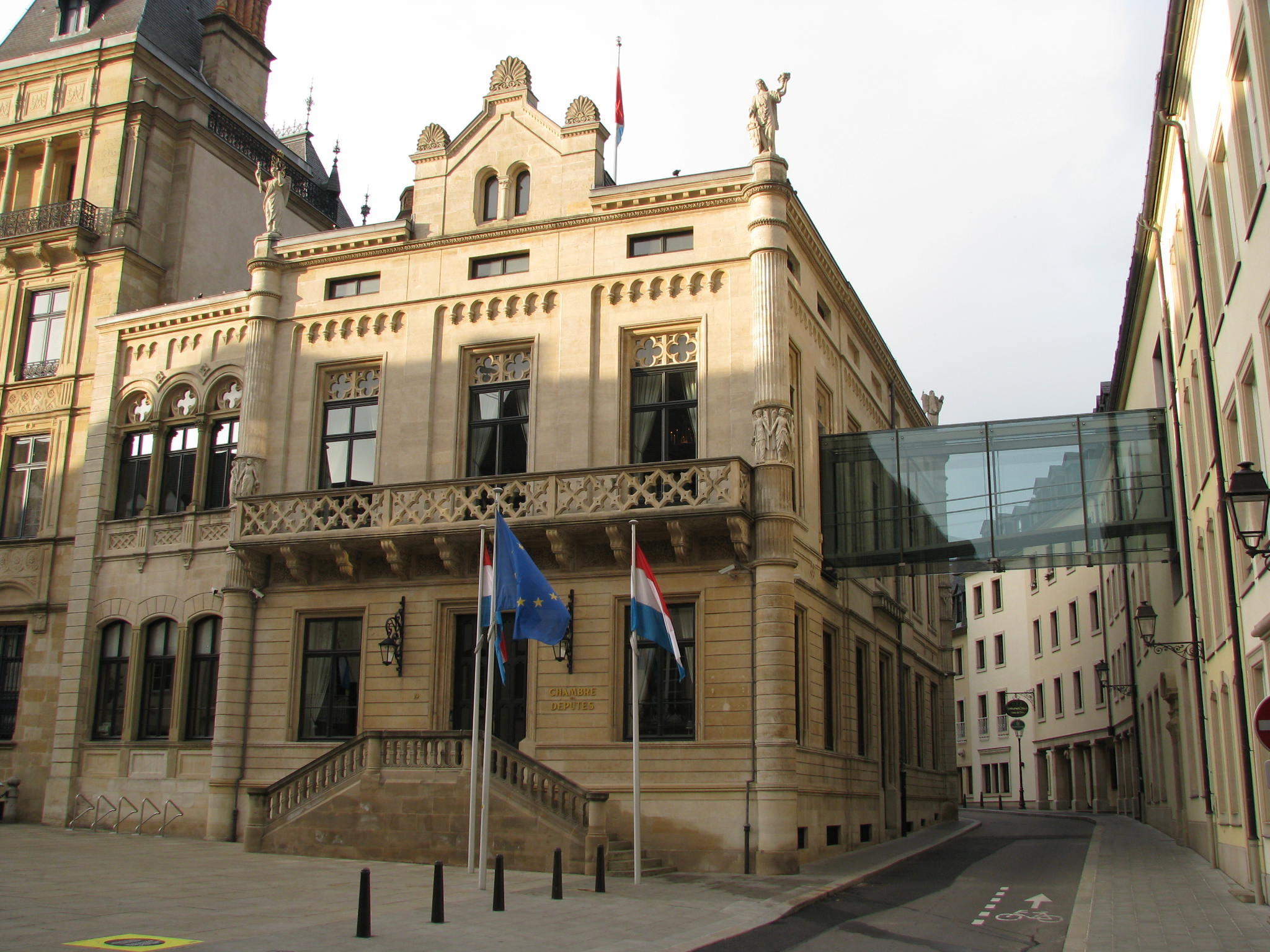

Overview
- Legislative body: Chamber of Deputies
- Meeting place: Hôtel de la Chambre, Krautmaart
- Term: 24 October 2023 –
- Election: 2023 general election
- Government: Frieden-Bettel
- Website: www.chd.lu/en

Deputies
- Members: 60
- President: Claude Wiseler (CSV)
- Vice Presidents: Michel Wolter (CSV); Mars Di Bartolomeo (LSAP); André Bauler (DP) (Note: Replaced Fernand Etgen on 20 January 2026.)

In the Grand Duchy of Luxembourg, the 2023-2028 legislature of the Chamber of Deputies is a parliamentary cycle which opened on 24 October 2023, following the legislative elections of 8 October 2023.

== Member list ==
Name	Portrait	Party	Deputy since	Constituency	Date of birth
Diane Adehm		CSV	8 March 2011	Centre	13 September 1970
Maurice Bauer		CSV	21 November 2023	Centre	11 October 1971
Alex Donnersbach		CSV	21 November 2023	Centre	9 January 1992
Paul Galles		CSV	30 October 2018	Centre	18 May 1973
Marc Lies		CSV	28 July 2009	Centre	30 December 1968
Laurent Mosar		CSV	21 November 2023	Centre	8 February 1958
Claude Wiseler		CSV	5 December 2013	Centre	30 January 1960
Ricardo Marques		CSV	10 October 2024	East	26 April 1993
Octavie Modert		CSV	5 December 2013	East	15 November 1966
Stéphanie Weydert		CSV	21 November 2023	East	30 April 1984
Jeff Boonen		CSV	21 November 2023	North	1 June 1985
Emile Eicher		CSV	28 July 2009	North	30 June 1955
Jean-Paul Schaaf		CSV	11 July 2024	North	1 December 1965
Charel Weiler		CSV	21 November 2023	North	18 September 1986
Félix Eischen		CSV	8 July 2009	South	5 February 1966
Nancy Kemp-Arendt		CSV	3 June 2003	South	22 May 1969
Françoise Kemp		CSV	21 November 2023	South	24 April 1991
Georges Mischo		CSV	20 January 2026	South	18 September 1974
Nathalie Morgenthaler		CSV	21 November 2023	South	9 October 1979
Michel Wolter		CSV	3 August 2004	South	13 September 1962
Laurent Zeimet		CSV	24 October 2023	South	12 October 1974
Guy Arendt		DP	21 November 2023	Centre	13 April 1954
Simone Beissel		DP	13 November 2013	Centre	27 April 1953
Corinne Cahen		DP	24 October 2023	Centre	16 May 1973
Patrick Goldschmidt		DP	21 November 2023	Centre	2 February 1970
Lydie Polfer		DP	8 July 2009	Centre	22 November 1952
Gérard Schockmel		DP	24 October 2023	Centre	9 March 1961
Gilles Baum		DP	21 November 2023	East	16 January 1973
Carole Hartmann		DP	6 December 2018	East	3 June 1987
André Bauler		DP	21 November 2023	North	5 February 1964
Marc Hansen		DP	20 January 2026	North	10 April 1971
Barbara Agostino		DP	21 November 2023	South	6 January 1982
Luc Emering		DP	24 October 2023	South	13 July 1996
Gusty Graas		DP	13 November 2013	South	14 September 1957
Mandy Minella		DP	21 November 2023	South	22 November 1985
Francine Closener		LSAP	3 December 2019	Centre	29 December 1969
Claire Delcourt		LSAP	24 October 2023	Centre	23 January 1989
Franz Fayot		LSAP	21 November 2023	Centre	28 February 1972
Ben Streff		LSAP	9 June 2026	East	30 January 1995
Claude Haagen		LSAP	21 November 2023	North	18 May 1962
Dan Biancalana		LSAP	30 October 2018	South	6 November 1977
Taina Bofferding		LSAP	21 November 2023	South	22 November 1982
Liz Braz		LSAP	24 October 2023	South	29 September 1996
Yves Cruchten		LSAP	21 November 2023	South	1 May 1975
Mars Di Bartolomeo		LSAP	5 December 2013	South	27 June 1952
Georges Engel		LSAP	21 November 2023	South	7 September 1968
Ben Polidori		LSAP	24 October 2023	North	13 November 1989
Tom Weidig		ADR	24 October 2023	Centre	7 December 1972
Alexandra Schoos		ADR	24 October 2023	East	13 May 1988
Michel Lemaire		ADR	20 November 2025	North	8 November 1988
Dan Hardy		ADR	11 July 2024	South	29 March 1972
Fred Keup		ADR	14 October 2020	South	15 May 1980
Djuna Bernard		Gréng	11 July 2024	Centre	15 June 1992
Sam Tanson		Gréng	21 November 2023	Centre	4 April 1977
Josée Lorsché		Gréng	13 October 2026	South	9 September 1961
Meris Šehović		Gréng	24 October 2023	South	14 September 1991
Sven Clement		PPL	30 October 2018	Centre	19 January 1989
Marc Goergen		PPL	30 October 2018	South	12 January 1985
Ana Correia da Veiga		Lénk	14 October 2026	Centre	11 January 1983
Gary Diderich		Lénk	14 October 2026	South	29 October 1982

== Former members ==
Name	Portrait	Party	Constituency	Deputy from	Deputy until	Reason	Replaced by
Luc Frieden		CSV	Centre	24 October 2023	17 November 2023	Joined government	Maurice Bauer
Elisabeth Margue		CSV	Centre	11 October 2022	17 November 2023	Joined government	Laurent Mosar
Serge Wilmes		CSV	Centre	11 October 2011	17 November 2023	Joined government	Alex Donnersbach
Léon Gloden		CSV	East	28 July 2009	17 November 2023	Joined government	Stéphanie Weydert
Martine Hansen		CSV	North	5 December 2013	17 November 2023	Joined government	Jeff Boonen
Gilles Roth		CSV	South	24 April 2007	17 November 2023	Joined government	Nathalie Morgenthaler
Fernand Kartheiser		ADR	South	8 July 2009	11 July 2024	Elected to the European Parliament	Dan Hardy
Christophe Hansen		CSV	North	24 October 2023	11 July 2024	Elected to the European Parliament	Jean-Paul Schaaf
François Bausch		Gréng	Centre	21 November 2023	11 July 2024	Political retirement	Djuna Bernard
Max Hengel		CSV	East	11 January 2022	17 August 2024	Death	Ricardo Marques
Jeff Engelen		ADR	North	30 October 2018	19 November 2025	Political retirement	Michel Lemaire
Marc Spautz		CSV	South	5 December 2013	11 December 2025	Joined government	Georges Mischo
Fernand Etgen		DP	North	30 October 2018	18 December 2025	Political retirement	Marc Hansen
Paulette Lenert		LSAP	East	21 November 2023	9 June 2026	Nomination to the Council of State	Ben Streff
Joëlle Welfring		Gréng	South	21 November 2023	30 September 2026	Nomination to the European Investment Bank	Josée Lorsché
David Wagner		Lénk	Centre	24 October 2023	13 October 2026	Rotation principle	Gary Diderich
Marc Baum		Lénk	South	24 October 2023	13 October 2026	Rotation principle	Ana Correia da Veiga
