= Martine Hansen =

Luxembourgish politician (born 1965)

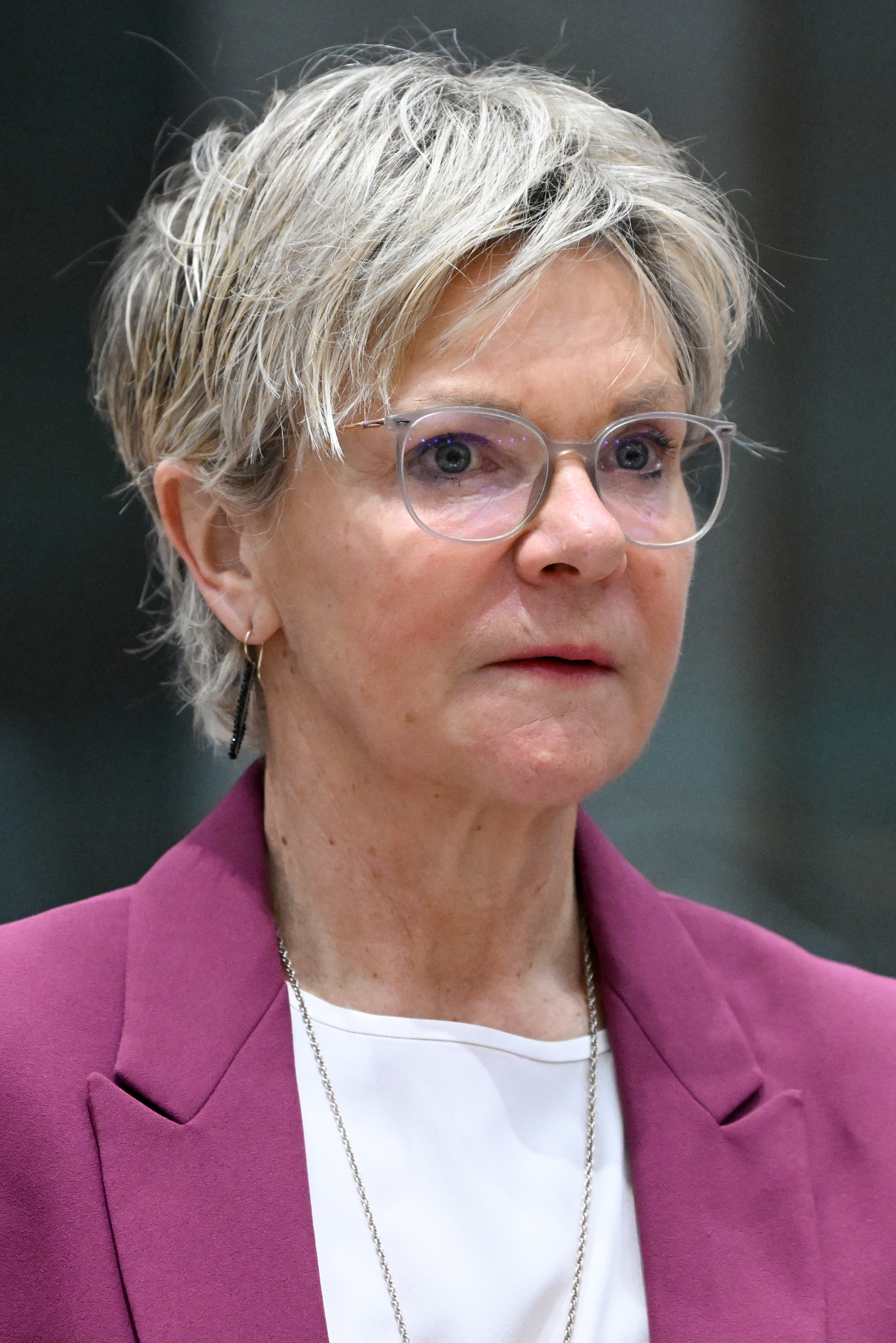
- Hansen in 2024

Minister of Sport
- Incumbent
- Assumed office 11 December 2025
- Prime Minister: Luc Frieden
- Government: Frieden-Bettel
- Preceded by: Georges Mischo

Minister of Agriculture, Food and Viticulture
- Incumbent
- Assumed office 17 November 2023
- Prime Minister: Luc Frieden
- Government: Frieden-Bettel
- Preceded by: Claude Haagen

Minister for Consumer Protection
- Incumbent
- Assumed office 17 November 2023
- Prime Minister: Luc Frieden
- Government: Frieden-Bettel
- Preceded by: Paulette Lenert

Minister for Higher Education and Research
- In office 30 April 2013 – 4 December 2013
- Prime Minister: Jean-Claude Juncker
- Government: Juncker-Asselborn II
- Preceded by: François Biltgen
- Succeeded by: Claude Meisch

Member of the Chamber of Deputies
- In office 4 December 2013 – 17 November 2023
- Constituency: North

Personal details
- Born: 10 December 1965 (age 60) Wiltz, Luxembourg
- Party: CSV
- Relatives: Christophe Hansen (cousin)
- Education: University of Hohenheim; TU Kaiserslautern
- Profession: Teacher; politician

Martine Hansen (born 10 December 1965) is a Luxembourgish agricultural economist and politician of the Christian Social People's Party (CSV) who serves in the Frieden-Bettel Government as Minister of Agriculture, Food and Viticulture and Minister for Consumer Protection since November 2023, and as Minister of Sport since December 2025. She was a member of the Chamber of Deputies (2013–2023) and served as Minister for Higher Education and Research from April to December 2013 in the Juncker–Asselborn II Government.

== Early life ==
Hansen was born on 10 December 1965 in Wiltz and grew up as the daughter of a farmer in Tarchamps. She completed her secondary school studies at the Lycée classique de Diekirch and studied Agricultural Sciences at the University of Hohenheim, specializing in Agricultural Economics and Social Sciences. From 1993 to 2006, Hansen worked as a teacher at the Lycée Technique Agricole (LTA), an agricultural high school in Gilsdorf. After a two-year correspondence course in school management at the Technical University of Kaiserslautern, Hansen obtained another master's degree. In 2006, she became the LTA's first female headmaster, a position she held until her appointment as Minister of Higher Education in April 2013. As headmaster, she was known for submitting whole classes of high school students to drug tests without the knowledge of their parents.

== Political career ==
=== Minister for Higher Education and Research ===
On 30 April 2013, Hansen was sworn in as Minister for Higher Education and Research in the Juncker–Asselborn II Government. As both Marie-Josée Jacobs and François Biltgen resigned, the latter to become judge at the European Court of Justice, two new ministers were needed. As this government reshuffle happened roughly a year before the planned date for the next general election (2014), the choice of Hansen was seen as electorally motivated, as she was "tailored" to the electoral district of her predecessor (in an electoral sense) Jacobs. Hansen did not inherit Biltgen's whole portfolio, since it was split between many members of the government.

Hansen's time as minister was short, as the government resigned on 11 July 2013 and snap elections were called for October 2013. She oversaw the reform of the State financial aid for higher education studies. The previous model had been declared illegal by the European Court of Justice, as it discriminated against the children of residents of neighboring countries working in Luxembourg. Her law was criticized as also being discriminating, as it would only grant financial aid for children of people that worked at least five years without interruption in Luxembourg. One issue she could not finish during her term was the procurement of technical equipment for the University of Luxembourg at its new buildings in Esch-Belval.

=== Chamber of Deputies ===
In the 2013 general election, Hansen was elected to the Chamber of Deputies. With 16,838 votes, she came in second place on the CSV's list for the North Constituency and had the third most votes of any candidate in the constituency. As her party was not part of the Bettel Government, she became an opposition parliamentarian. Hansen was member of the parliamentary committees on Petitions, Agriculture, Viticulture, Rural Development and Consumer Protection; National Education, Children and Youth; Higher Education, Research, Media, Communications and Space; Environment; Family and Integration; Health, Equal Opportunities and Sports, covering only sports on the latter. These committees mostly covered her former ministerial portfolio as well as her expertise in agricultural sciences. Hansen was characterized as voicing the issues and interests of farmers, often taking the same position as their representative organizations.

On 23 January 2014, Hansen was elected as the district chairwoman of CSV Norden, the party's local branch for the North Constituency, a position she held until 6 December 2018, when she was replaced by her cousin Christophe Hansen. At the CSV congress on 8 February 2014, Hansen was elected vice-president of her party, a position she held together with Françoise Hetto-Gaasch. She held this position until 26 January 2019.

During the campaign for the 2018 general election, Hansen was the lead candidate for her party in the North. With 20,249 votes, Hansen was the candidate with the most votes in her district. The CSV lost two seats in the election and remained in the opposition, with the three government that formed the first Bettel Government immediately beginning talks to renew their coalition. On 5 December 2018, Hansen was elected as president of the CSV's parliamentary group, becoming the de facto leader of the opposition.

During her second term in the Chamber of Deputies, Hansen mostly continued to work on the same issues. As leader of the opposition, she became chairwoman of the parliamentary control committee of the State Intelligence Service, and member of the Conference of Presidents and the Bureau, the two bodies responsible for the organization of the Chamber. Furthermore, Hansen was part of a number of parliamentary committees, including as vice-chairwoman of the committees on Agriculture, Viticulture and Rural Development; and National Education, Children, Youth, Higher Education and Research.

As leader of the CSV parliamentary group, Hansen was a key figure during the internal conflict with party president Frank Engel in 2021, who resigned after a member of the parliamentary group denounced him due to suspicion of misappropriation of party assets and sham employment. This was seen as a political victory for the parliamentary group, with Hansen as its leader, over Engel. This resulted in a restructuring of the party leadership, which lead to the parliamentary group leadership split between Hansen and Gilles Roth, starting on 8 April 2021. She was characterized as a "terrier", as she criticized the Bettel Government often and sharply, mostly about agricultural politics, child care, health politics and what she saw as "overbearing environmental protection".

In the electoral campaign for the 2023 general election, the CSV opted for two lead candidates in every voting district, a position Hansen held together with her cousin Christophe Hansen. She was again the candidate with the most votes in the North, with 20,160 votes.

=== Minister for Minister of Agriculture, Food and Viticulture and Minister for Consumer Protection ===
Since 17 November 2023, Hansen is Minister of Agriculture, Food and Viticulture and Minister for Consumer Protection in the Frieden-Bettel Government. As minister, Hansen has the sole responsibility over policy governing the food-chain. The government appointed Climate Policy Observatory criticized the lack of ambition to lower greenhouse gas emissions from this sector. During her first meeting with the Chamber of Agriculture, she announced the institutionalization of the "Landwirtschaftsdësch" (agricultural round table), a meeting of government and representatives of the sector, taking place two times a year. When Hansen presented the focal points of her policy and coalition program, she stressed that the goals of the previous government on organic farming had not been realistic. She stated she wanted to set new targets, together with the agricultural sector and expressed doubt on organic farming targets where the only measure is agricultural surface. She said she wanted to increase support for agricultural business that are partially converting to organic farming.

During the 2024 protest wave of European farmers, Luxembourg only saw a small protest, which was joined by members of the Lëtzebuerger Landjugend a Jongbaueren (rural youth and young farmers). An emergency meeting between agricultural representatives and Hansen, environmental minister Serge Wilmes and prime minister Luc Frieden was arranged. In an open letter, two agricultural organizations called protests absurd, since the government was listening to them. However, it was noted that organizations representing organic farmers were not invited to this meeting.

For the overshoot day 2024, which was on 20 February for Luxembourg, Hansen's Consumer Protection ministry reminded the public to be conscious about over-consumption, buy regional and seasonal food and use public transport, as message that was criticized for overexaggerating the contribution of individual consumers to climate change.

Hansen, together with environmental minister Serge Wilmes, invited to the first meeting of the "Landwirtschaftsdësch" on 5 March 2024. Topics discussed were the simplification of administrative procedures and a renewal of environmental and water protection laws, in order to make it easier for agricultural actors to build in green areas.Hansen also announced a new agricultural strategy would be written, with a more proactive consulting of agricultural professional. Agricultural representatives stated they were content with the meeting, but it was noted that organizations representing organic farmers or environmental groups have not been invited.

On 26 May 2025, Hansen, together with her Austrian counterpart Norbert Totschnig, presented a proposal to simplify the EU Regulation on Deforestation-free products to the Agriculture and Fisheries Council. Nine other countries joined the plea, arguing the proposed standards were introducing to much paperwork for small farmers. Environmental NGOs condemned this proposal, arguing the changes would not be compatible with WTO rules. While Hansen was backed by environmental minister Serge Wilmes, two Luxembourg based NGOs criticized her proposals and Wilmes' backing.

== Personal life ==
Hansen lives in Heiderscheid in the commune of Esch-sur-Sûre and has a daughter. One of her hobbies is long-distance running. She holds shares in Fresenius.

== Honours and awards ==
Award or decoration		Country	Date
Ribbon	Name	Country	Date
	Order of Merit of the Grand Duchy of Luxembourg (Grand Officer)	Luxembourg	2014
