= Council of Government of Luxembourg =

The Council of Government of Luxembourg consists of the Prime Minister, the Deputy Prime Minister and a number of ministers.

It was created by Grand Ducal decree on 29 August 1846, as the administrator of the country: "The Council of Government administers the country, while complying with laws and regulations (...) The administration of the country being entrusted to the Council of Government, every measure and administrative decision emanates from it, excepting the authorisation or approval of the Grand Duke, in cases determined by the laws and regulations."

It meets on a weekly basis to discuss bills to propose to the Chamber of Deputies. It is obliged to deliberate as a group on matters to be submitted to the Grand Duke.

Its decisions are taken by a majority of votes. In case of an even split, the Prime Minister has the casting vote.

All members of the government are responsible for every decision taken by the Council of Government which they agreed with. However, if a minister who makes their disagreement known in the minutes of a Council of Government meeting, they may be freed from their responsibility.

== Size and titles ==
The Constitution of 1868 did not put a limit on the number of members of the government, nor did it provide a title for them. It gave the Grand Duke the freedom to create ministries and to divide up departments according to his needs. In the 19th century and up until the 1930s, the government generally consisted of the Prime Minister and three "administrators-general", or from 1857, "directors-general". The decree of 24 March 1936 changed their titles to "ministers". The growth in the number of ministers came about after the Second World War, when the National Union Government was formed. After this, the government's number of ministers increased in parallel with the growth of the State's scope of activities, and Luxembourg's integration in international politics. At the beginning of the 2009-2013 legislature, the government was composed of 15 ministers.

== Current Cabinet ==
Ministry	Incumbent	Since	Party
Prime Minister	Luc Frieden	November 17, 2023	Christian Social People's Party
Deputy Prime Minister Minister for Foreign and European Affairs, Cooperation, Foreign Trade and the Greater Region	Xavier Bettel	November 17, 2023	Democratic Party
Minister of Finance	Gilles Roth	November 17, 2023	Christian Social People's Party
Minister for the Economy, SMEs, Energy and Tourism	Lex Delles	November 17, 2023	Democratic Party
Minister for Agriculture, Food and Viticulture	Martine Hansen	November 17, 2023	Christian Social People's Party
Minister for National Education, Housing, Children and Youth	Claude Meisch	November 17, 2023	Democratic Party
Minister of Home Affairs	Léon Gloden	November 17, 2023	Christian Social People's Party
Minister for the Family, Solidarity and the Reception of Refugees	Max Hahn	November 17, 2023	Democratic Party
Minister of Justice Minister Delegate to the Prime Minister, in charge of Media and Communications Minister Delegate to the Prime Minister, in charge of Relations with Parliament	Elisabeth Margue	November 17, 2023	Christian Social People's Party
Minister of Defence Minister for Gender Equality and Diversity Minister of Mobility and Public Works	Yuriko Backes	November 17, 2023	Democratic Party
Minister for Sport and Labour	Georges Mischo	November 17, 2023	Christian Social People's Party
Minister for Culture Minister delegate for Tourism	Éric Thill	November 17, 2023	Democratic Party
Minister for the Civil Service and the Environment, Climate and Biodiversity	Serge Wilmes	November 17, 2023	Christian Social People's Party
Minister for Digitalisation, Research and Higher Education	Stéphanie Obertin	November 17, 2023	Democratic Party
