= Bettel II Government =

34th Government of Luxembourg from 2018 to 2023

- Cabinet of Luxembourg
- 2018–2023
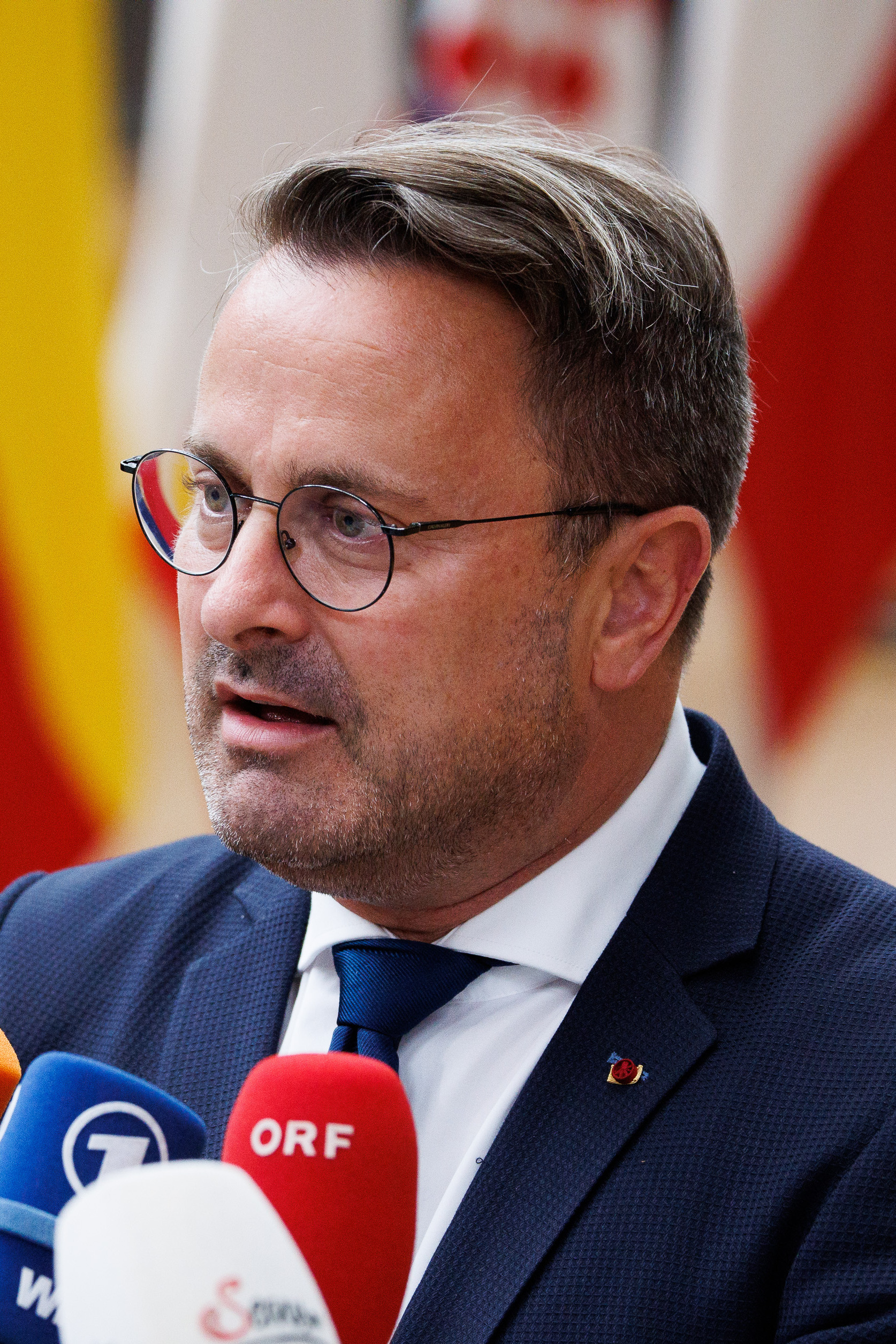
- Date formed: 5 December 2018
- Date dissolved: 17 November 2023 (4 years, 11 months, 1 week and 5 days)

People and organisations
- Grand Duke: Henri
- Prime Minister: Xavier Bettel
- Deputy Prime Minister: Paulette Lenert; François Bausch
- Total no. of members: 17
- Member parties: DP; LSAP; Greens
- Status in legislature: Majority government (coalition)
- Opposition parties: CSV; ADR; Pirates; The Left
- Opposition leader: Martine Hansen (Note: De facto leader of the opposition as the leader of the largest opposition group in the Chamber of Deputes.)

History
- Election: 2018 general election
- Legislature terms: 34th Legislature of the Chamber of Deputies
- Predecessor: Bettel I Government
- Successor: Frieden-Bettel Government

The Bettel II government (also known as Bettel-Lenert-Bausch Government) was the government of Luxembourg from 2018 to 2023. It was led by Prime Minister Xavier Bettel and co-Deputy Prime Ministers Paulette Lenert and François Bausch. It was formed on 5 December 2018, after the 2018 election which saw all 60 seats in the Chamber of Deputies renewed. The government was a continuation of the traffic light coalition (or so-called Gambia coalition, in reference to the colours of the Gambia's flag) between the Democratic Party (DP), the Luxembourg Socialist Workers' Party (LSAP) and The Greens from the First Bettel–Schneider Ministry, with minor changes.

In the 2023 election, the government gained 29 seats, losing its majority due to the electoral defeat of The Greens. On 9 October 2023, Bettel tendered his resignation to Grand Duke Henri, who the same day appointed CSV leader Luc Frieden to form a government, which took office on 17 November and in which Bettel became Deputy Prime Minister.

== Overview ==
Name	Portrait	Party	Office
Xavier Bettel		DP	Prime Minister; Minister of Communications and the Media; Minister of State; Minister of Administrative Reform
Paulette Lenert		LSAP	First Deputy Prime Minister; Minister of Health; Minister of Consumer Protection
François Bausch		DG	Second Deputy Prime Minister; Minister of Mobility, Transport, & Public Works; Minister of Defence
Jean Asselborn		LSAP	Minister of Foreign Affairs; Minister of Immigration and Asylum
Claude Haagen		LSAP	Minister of Agriculture; Minister of Social Security
Sam Tanson		DG	Minister of Justice; Minister of Culture
Yuriko Backes		DP	Minister of Finance
Georges Engel		LSAP	Minister of Sport; Minister of Labour, Employment and the Social and Solidarity Economy
Claude Meisch		DP	Minister of Children and Youth; Minister of Higher Education and Research; Minister of National Education
Max Hahn		DP	Minister of the Greater Region; Minister of Family and Integration
Joëlle Welfring		DG	Minister of the Environment, Climate, and Sustainable Development
Marc Hansen		DP	Minister of the Civil Service; Minister of Relations with Parliament
Claude Turmes		DG	Minister of Energy; Minister of Spatial Planning
Taina Bofferding		LSAP	Minister of the Interior; Minister of Equal Opportunities
Lex Delles		DP	Minister of Small and Medium Enterprises; Minister of Tourism
Henri Kox		DG	Minister of Housing; Minister of Internal Security
Franz Fayot		LSAP	Minister of the Economy; Minister of Cooperation and Humanitarian Action
