= Administration of Customs and Excise (Luxembourg) =

Luxembourgish Customs and Excise Douane - an Accisenadministratioun Administration des douanes et accises
- Luxembourgish Customs logo

Jurisdictional structure
- Operations jurisdiction: Luxembourg
- Specialist jurisdiction: Customs, excise, gambling

Operational structure
- Headquarters: 22, Rue de Bitbourg, Luxembourg City (Hamm)
- Elected officer responsible: Gilles Roth
- Agency executive: Alain Bellot
- Parent agency: Ministry of Finances

Website
- www.douanes.public.lu

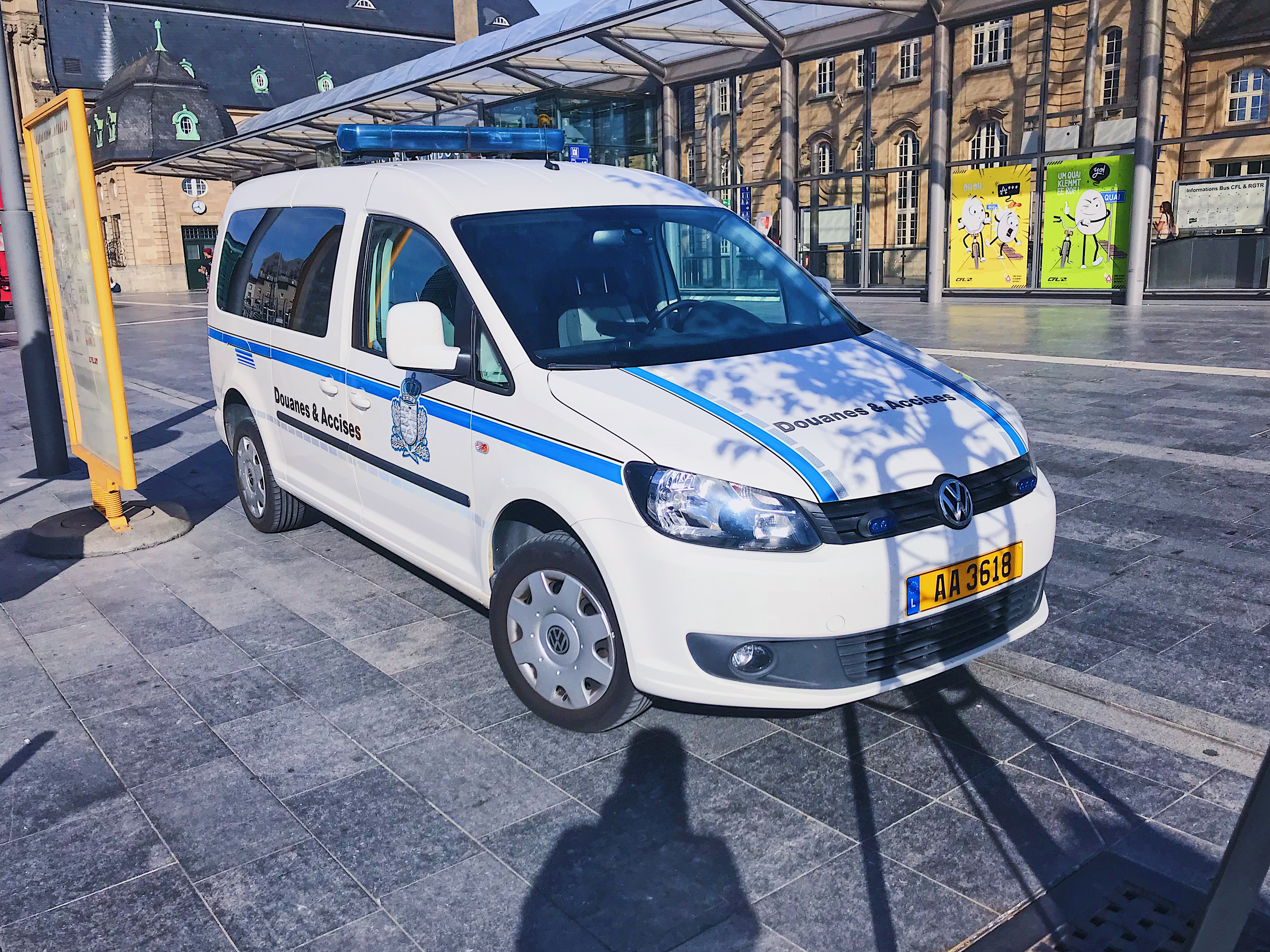
Volkswagen Caddy patrol unit of the Luxembourgish Customs

The Customs and Excise Agency (Luxembourgish: Douane - an Accisenadministratioun or Lëtzebuerger Douane), abbreviated as ADA (French: Administration des douanes et accises), is the customs service of the Grand Duchy of Luxembourg. It is affiliated with the Ministry of Finance.

The central headquarters of the administration is located at 22, rue de Bitbourg, in Luxembourg City.
