= Serge Wilmes =

Luxembourgish politician

The Honourable Serge Wilmes
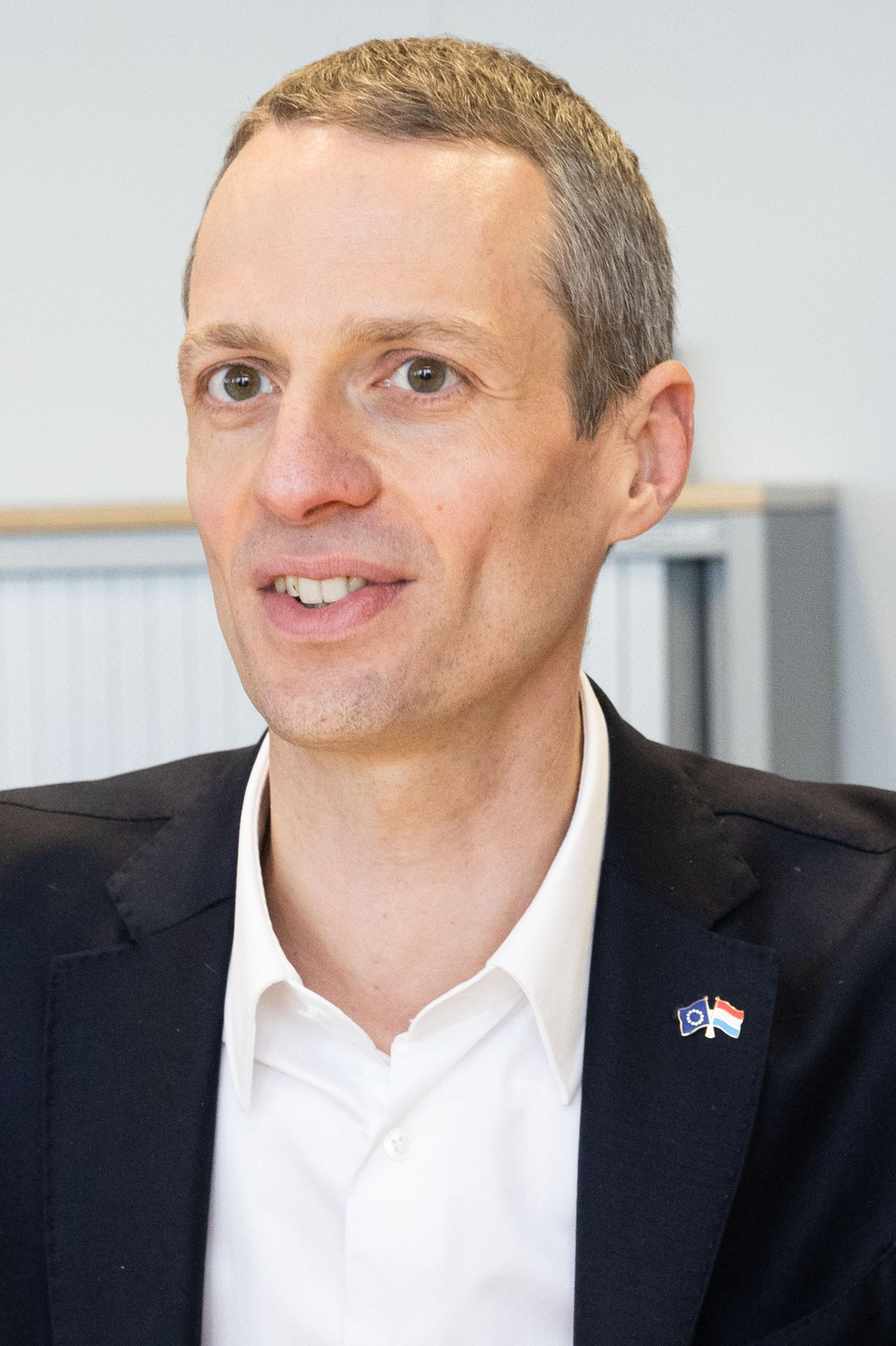
- Wilmes in 2025

Minister of the Environment, Climate and Biodiversity Minister of Public Service
- Incumbent
- Assumed office 17 November 2023
- Prime Minister: Luc Frieden
- Government: Frieden-Bettel
- Preceded by: Joëlle Welfring (Environment); Marc Hansen (Public Service)

First Alderman of Luxembourg City
- In office 22 November 2017 – 17 November 2023
- Mayor: Lydie Polfer
- Preceded by: Sam Tanson
- Succeeded by: Maurice Bauer

Member of the Chamber of Deputies
- In office 11 October 2011 – 17 November 2023
- Preceded by: Lucien Thiel
- Succeeded by: Alex Donnersbach
- Constituency: Centre

Personal details
- Born: 6 May 1982 (age 44) Luxembourg City, Luxembourg
- Party: CSV
- Education: Nancy 2 University; University of Luxembourg

Serge Wilmes (born 6 May 1982) is a Luxembourgish politician of the Christian Social People's Party (CSV), serving as Minister of the Environment, Climate and Biodiversity and Minister of Public Service in the Frieden-Bettel Government. He was previously a member of the Chamber of Deputies from 2011 to 2023 and an alderman of Luxembourg City from 2017 to 2023.

== Biography ==
=== Early life ===
Originally from Merl in Luxembourg City, Wilmes graduated from lycée Michel-Rodange in 2001. Following graduation, Wilmes studied at Nancy 2 University where he received his maîtrise in history in 2005. The next year, Wilmes received his second-level masters in Contemporary European History from the University of Luxembourg. His master's thesis was on the position of right-wing Catholic movements on Abortion in the 1970s.

Wilmes worked for the National Archives of Luxembourg from 2007 to 2008.,

=== Political career ===
A member of Christian Social People's Party since 2000, Wilmes was encouraged by Michel Wolter to serve as a parliamentary advisor for the party in the Chamber of Deputies, a position he held from 2008 to November 2011. In the meantime, Wilmes was elected president of the party's youth movement, a position he held until February 2014.,

Following the death of Lucien Thiel on 25 August 2011, Wilmes was designated his successor in the Chamber of Deputies. In accordance with the Constitution, Wilmes was sworn in on 11 October 2011 and served the remainder of Thiel's term in the Centre constituency. Wilmes was re-elected in the 2013 and 2018 elections.

During the 2017 communal elections, Wilmes was elected to the Luxembourg City Communal Council, where he became an échevin.

In February 2019, Wilmes stood as a candidate for leadership of the Christian Social People's Party, going up against MEP Frank Engel. Despite losing to Engel, Wilmes maintained a lot of popularity prior to the convention to elect Engel's successor. However, in 2021, Claude Wiseler was elected as the party's new leader.

== Personal life ==
Wilmes is the brother of Philippe Wilmes, a Democratic Party (DP) councillor in Leudelange and an orthopedic surgeon who was a consultant for his party during the 2023 CSV-DP coalition talks. On 22 January 2026, Philippe was suspended as a surgeon by the Ministry for Health for having allegedly conducted unnecessary operations that resulted in bodily harm.

== Publications ==
- C wéi Crémant d'Chamber vun A bis Z (in Luxembourgish). Luxembourg: Éditions Saint-Paul. 2013. p. 135. ISBN 978-2-8796-3937-6. OCLC 891566636.
