= Bettel I Government =

33rd Government of Luxembourg from 2013 to 2018

- Cabinet of Luxembourg
- 2013–2018
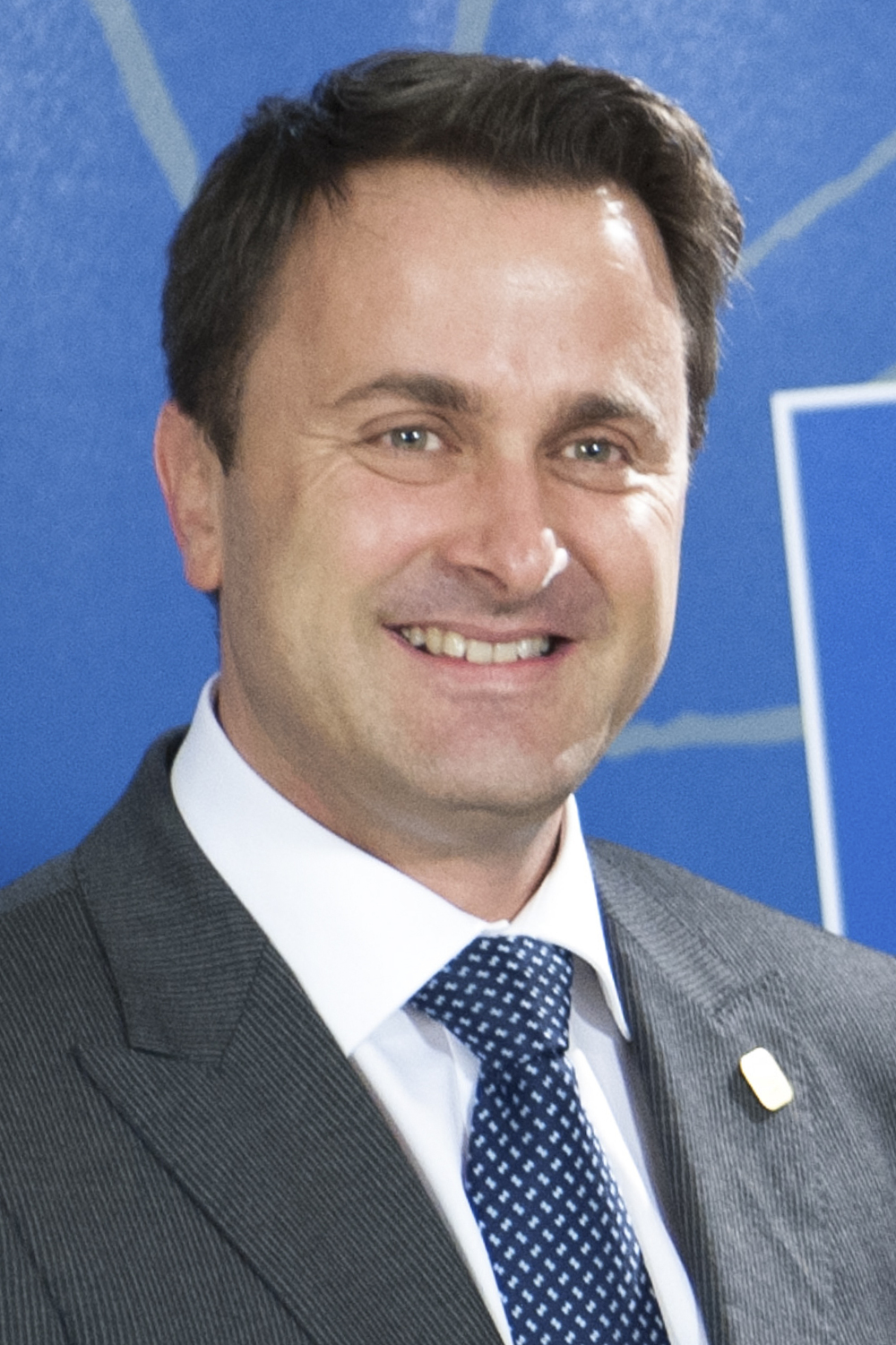
- Date formed: 4 December 2013
- Date dissolved: 5 December 2018 (5 years and 1 day)

People and organisations
- Grand Duke: Henri
- Prime Minister: Xavier Bettel
- Deputy Prime Minister: Etienne Schneider
- Total no. of members: 15
- Member parties: DP; LSAP; Greens
- Status in legislature: Majority government (coalition)
- Opposition parties: CSV; ADR; The Left
- Opposition leader: Jean-Claude Juncker (Note: De facto leader of the opposition as the leader of the largest opposition group in the Chamber of Deputes.) (2013-2014); Claude Wiseler (Note: De facto leader of the opposition as the leader of the largest opposition group in the Chamber of Deputes.) (2014-2018)

History
- Election: 2013 general election
- Legislature terms: 33rd Legislature of the Chamber of Deputies
- Predecessor: Juncker-Asselborn II Government
- Successor: Bettel II Government

The First Bettel Government (or Bettel I Government) was the ruling government of Luxembourg from 4 December 2013 to 5 December 2018. It was led by Prime Minister Xavier Bettel and Deputy Prime Minister Etienne Schneider. It was formed on 4 December 2013, after the 2013 election which saw all 60 seats in the Chamber of Deputies renewed. The government was a traffic light coalition between the Democratic Party (DP), the Luxembourg Socialist Workers' Party (LSAP) and The Greens. It was succeeded by the second Bettel Government on 5 December 2018.

== Formation ==
Until 2013, Luxembourg was governed by a CSV–LSAP coalition under Jean-Claude Juncker. After concerns over political oversight of the intelligence agency of Luxembourg, the Service de Renseignement de l'État, the LSAP withdrew its support from the government. Juncker then resigned as prime minister on 11 July 2013 and asked the Grand-Duke to dissolve the Chamber of Deputies and call an election. In the election held on 20 October 2013, the CSV lost some seats but still remained as the largest party in parliament, though without a majority of seats. However, representatives of the DP, LSAP and the Greens agreed to form a government on election night, after the results had been announced. On 22 October, the Grand-Duke consulted with a representative from each electoral list, and Juncker. The next day he designated Georges Ravarani, the head of the administrative court, as the informateur for the formation of a new government. Coalition talks between the DP, LSAP and the Greens started within a few days, and the coalition agreement was announced one and a half months later, and the new government was sworn in on 4 December 2013. This was only the second government since 1945 that did not involve the CSV. It was also the first time the Greens were involved in government. The three parties had a majority of 32 seats out of 60 in the Chamber of Deputies. Due to the colours associated with the 3 parties (red, blue and green) the arrangement was known as a "Gambia coalition" among some commentators, as it reflected that country's flag.

== Overview ==
In general, the government had two main priorities, curbing the budget deficit, and in the area of social policy. In terms of the former, the government raised the basic rate of VAT from 15 to 17 percent from 1 January 2015.

Same-sex marriage was made legal from 1 January 2015.

On 11 September 2014 the Deputy Prime Minister Etienne Schneider announced plans to introduce a church tax, payable only by members of religious congregations; the churches would then have to pay their clergy's salaries themselves. This would have replaced the system of the clergy being paid by the state.

From November 2014, the government had to deal with the LuxLeaks scandal.

On 7 June 2015, the government held a constitutional referendum, asking, amongst other things, whether residents of Luxembourg without Luxembourgish nationality should be allowed to vote in national elections. While all 3 parties in the government coalition campaigned for a "Yes" vote, the result was an overwhelming "No".

== Composition ==
Name	Portrait	Party	Office
Xavier Bettel		DP	Prime Minister; Minister of State; Minister of Communications and the Media; Minister of Religious Affairs; Minister of Culture
Etienne Schneider		LSAP	Deputy Prime Minister; Minister of Defence; Minister of the Economy; Minister of Internal Security
Jean Asselborn		LSAP	Minister of Foreign Affairs; Minister of Immigration and Asylum
Félix Braz		DG	Minister of Justice
Nicolas Schmit		LSAP	Minister of Employment
Romain Schneider		LSAP	Minister of Cooperation and Humanitarian Action; Minister of Social Affairs; Minister of Sports
François Bausch		DG	Minister of Sustainable Development and Infrastructure
Fernand Etgen		DP	Minister of Agriculture, Viticulture, and Consumer Protection
Marc Hansen		DP	Minister of Housing
Pierre Gramegna		DP	Minister of Finance
Lydia Mutsch		LSAP	Minister of Equal Opportunities; Minister of Health
Daniel Kersch		LSAP	Minister of the Interior; Minister of Public Service and Administrative Reform
Claude Meisch		DP	Minister of Children and Youth; Minister of Higher Education and Research; Minister of National Education
Corinne Cahen		DP	Minister of Family and Integration
Carole Dieschbourg		DG	Minister of the Environment

Secretaries of State:

Name	Party	Office
Camille Gira	DG	Secretary of State for Sustainable Development and Infrastructure
Francine Closener	LSAP	Secretary of State for the Economy; Secretary of State for Internal Security; Secretary of State for Defence
Marc Hansen	DP	Secretary of State for Children and Youth; Secretary of State for Higher Education and Research; Secretary of State for Housing

On 16 December 2015, Maggy Nagel resigned as Minister for Housing and Minister for Culture. Xavier Bettel announced that he would take over as Minister for Culture, while Marc Hansen, hitherto a Secretary of State, would be made Minister for Housing.
