= François Bausch =

Luxembourgish politician

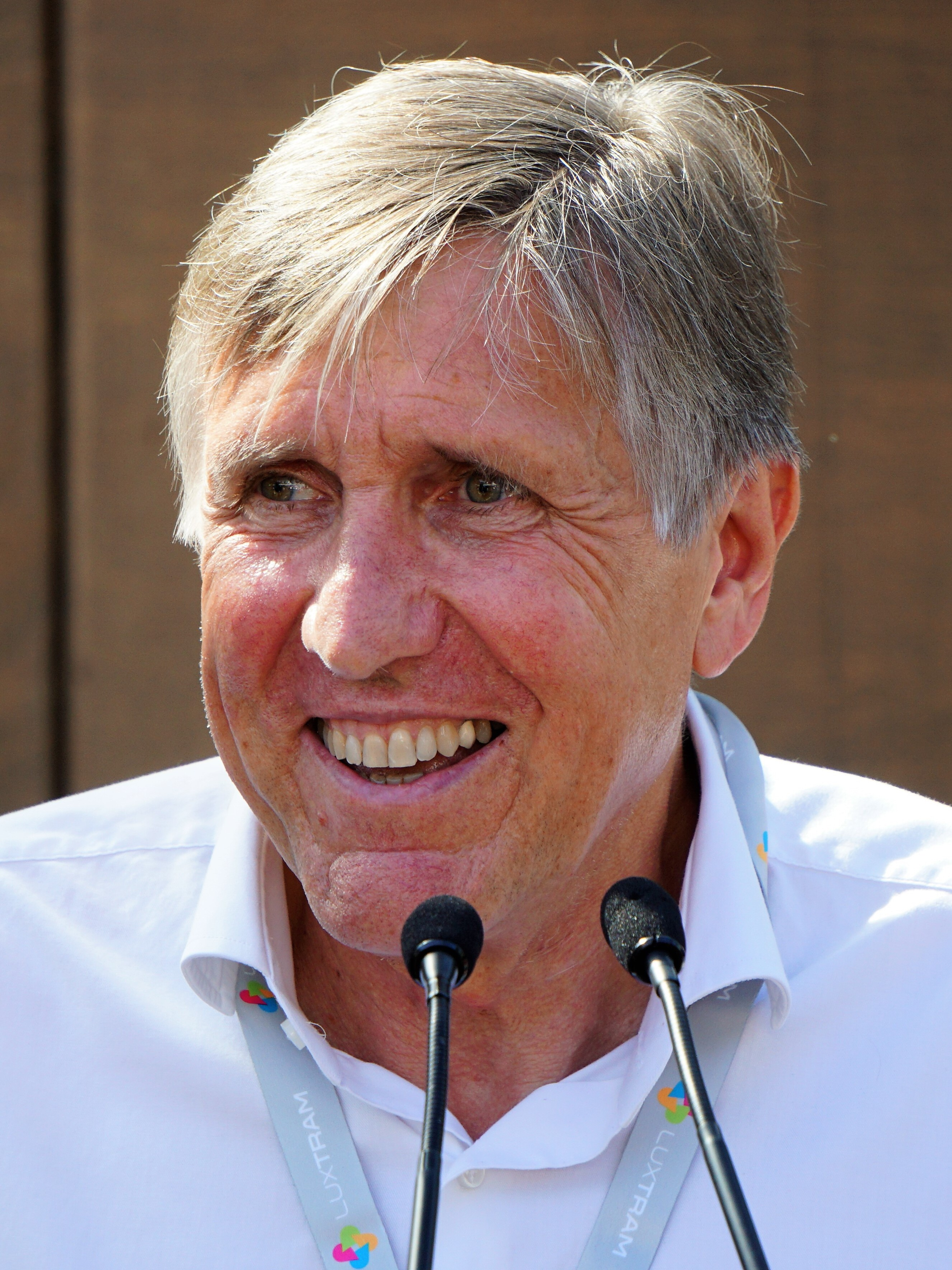

Member of the Chamber of Deputies of Luxembourg
- In office 21 November 2023 – 11 July 2024
- Succeeded by: Djuna Bernard
- Constituency: Centre
- In office 18 July 1994 – 4 December 2013
- Constituency: Centre
- In office 18 July 1989 – 11 October 1992
- Constituency: Centre

Deputy Prime Minister of Luxembourg
- In office 11 October 2019 – 17 November 2023 Serving with Paulette Lenert
- Prime Minister: Xavier Bettel
- Preceded by: Félix Braz
- Succeeded by: Xavier Bettel

Minister for Defence Minister of Mobility and Public Works
- In office 5 December 2018 – 17 November 2023
- Prime Minister: Xavier Bettel
- Preceded by: Étienne Schneider
- Succeeded by: Yuriko Backes

Minister of Sustainable Development and Infrastructure
- In office 4 December 2013 – 5 December 2018
- Prime Minister: Xavier Bettel
- Preceded by: Claude Wiseler
- Succeeded by: Carole Dieschbourg

First Alderman of Luxembourg City
- In office 10 November 2005 – 4 December 2013
- Mayor: Paul Helminger; Xavier Bettel
- Preceded by: Paul-Henri Meyers
- Succeeded by: Sam Tanson

Personal details
- Born: 16 October 1956 (age 69) Differdange, Luxembourg
- Party: Greens
- Spouse: Claudette Majerus

François Bausch (born 16 October 1956) is a Luxembourgish politician of the Greens who served as Deputy Prime Minister of Luxembourg from 2019 to 2023.

He was a member of the Chamber of Deputies from 1989 to 1992, from 1994 to 2013 and, from 2023 to 2024. Prior to entering the government, Bausch was leader of the Greens in the Chamber.

In September 2025, Bausch was appointed by the European Commission as European Coordinator for the Atlantic Transport Corridor.

Having served as Luxembourg City alderman (2005-2013) and minister (2013-2023) in charge of public transport, Bausch is sometimes dubbed the "father of the tramway", which returned to the city in 2017.

== Political career ==
=== Chamber of Deputies ===
Bausch first joined the Chamber of Deputies after the 1989 legislative election. Though not elected directly, he took over the seat of Thers Bodé, who died shortly after the election. He resigned on 11 October 1992, along with Jean Huss, under the Greens' agreed rotation system, allowing other candidates to serve as deputies. In the 1993 local elections, Bausch was elected to the communal council of Luxembourg City (starting 1 January 1994), and he was returned to the Chamber at the following year's election. In 1999, Bausch finished second to Renée Wagener amongst Greens candidates in the Centre constituency, with those two being elected.

In 1999, Bausch was a founding member of anti-free trade and pro-transaction tax (Tobin Tax) group, ATTAC Luxembourg, and the only member of Luxembourg parliament to do so. In the 2004 election, Bausch came top of the Greens' list by a comfortable distance on an improved result for the party (indeed, he finished fifth amongst all candidates), and was duly returned to the Chamber. On 3 August 2004, Bausch also became leader of the Greens' group in the Chamber. In the 2005 communal elections, the Democratic Party (DP)-Christian Social People's Party (CSV) coalition in Luxembourg City broke down, clearing the way for a DP-Greens cabinet, under which Bausch was appointed Chief Alderman.

As chairman of the Parliamentary Control Commission for the Luxembourg Secret Service (SREL), he initiated an investigation in late 2012 into alleged secret recordings of the Prime Minister Jean-Claude Juncker and Grand Duke Henri. This investigation became quickly politicized and mutated into a secret service enquiry commission, chaired by Socialist MP Alex Bodry and charged with investigating the activities and oversight of the SREL. However, in a strange twist, Bausch and other members of the Parliamentary Control Commission were allowed to join this "enquiry commission" that was legally responsible for investigating the SREL and its oversight, which includes the Parliamentary Control Commission itself. The Enquiry Commission was beset by partisan political actions and questionable legal tactics, including frequent leaks to journalists and politically motivated police raids, to the point that CSV MP Michel Wolter called for the journalists of the state owned station radio 100,7 to reveal their sources, who were suspected of being fellow non-CSV MPs and of fabricating information regarding secret dossiers of the SREL to suit their agenda. On 20 June 2013, Bausch, leaked a "draft" report from the commission widely to the Luxembourg press that placed all blame on the Prime Minister and laid no fault on the Parliamentary Control Commission.

== See also ==
- Bettel I Government (2013 - 2018)
- Bettel II Government (2018 - 2023)
