= Lucien Thiel =

Luxembourgish politician and journalist

Lucien Thiel (14 February 1943 – 25 August 2011) was a Luxembourgish politician and journalist. He was a member of the Christian Social People's Party (CSV), whose group he led in the Chamber of Deputies from 1 March 2011 until his sudden death six months later.

Born in Luxembourg City, Thiel studied journalism at university. From 1967 to 1979, Thiel was the editor of Revue, before becoming the editor-in-chief of d'Lëtzebuerger Land: a position that he held from 1980 to 1989. From 1990 to 2004, he was a director of the Luxembourg Bankers' Association (ABBL). From 2000 to 2002, Thiel was the President of the government's Economic and Social Council (French: Conseil économique et social).

Thiel ran for the Chamber of Deputies in the 2004 election, running for the CSV in Centre. He received the sixth-most votes among CSV candidates — 16,646 — allowing him to be elected easily. In the 2005 Luxembourgian local elections, he was also elected to Luxembourg communal council. In the 2009 general election, Thiel came fifth on the CSV's list, with 20,799 votes, and was re-elected. He took a significant interest in economic matters, particularly the protection of pensions and responding to the 2008 financial crisis. He was elected President of the CSV's group in the Chamber of Deputies in February 2011, replacing Jean-Louis Schiltz when he stepped down on 1 March 2011. Six months into the role, on 25 August 2011, Thiel died of a heart attack.

As well as his political and journalistic work, Thiel was socially active, founding the Kräizbierg Foundation for the disabled, of which he became chairman in 2011. At his death, he was married and had two children.

== Footnotes ==
Party political offices
Preceded by Jean-Louis Schiltz	President of the CSV in the Chamber of Deputies; 2011	Succeeded by Gilles Roth
