= Maurice Bauer =

Luxembourgish politician (born 1971)

The Honourable Maurice Bauer
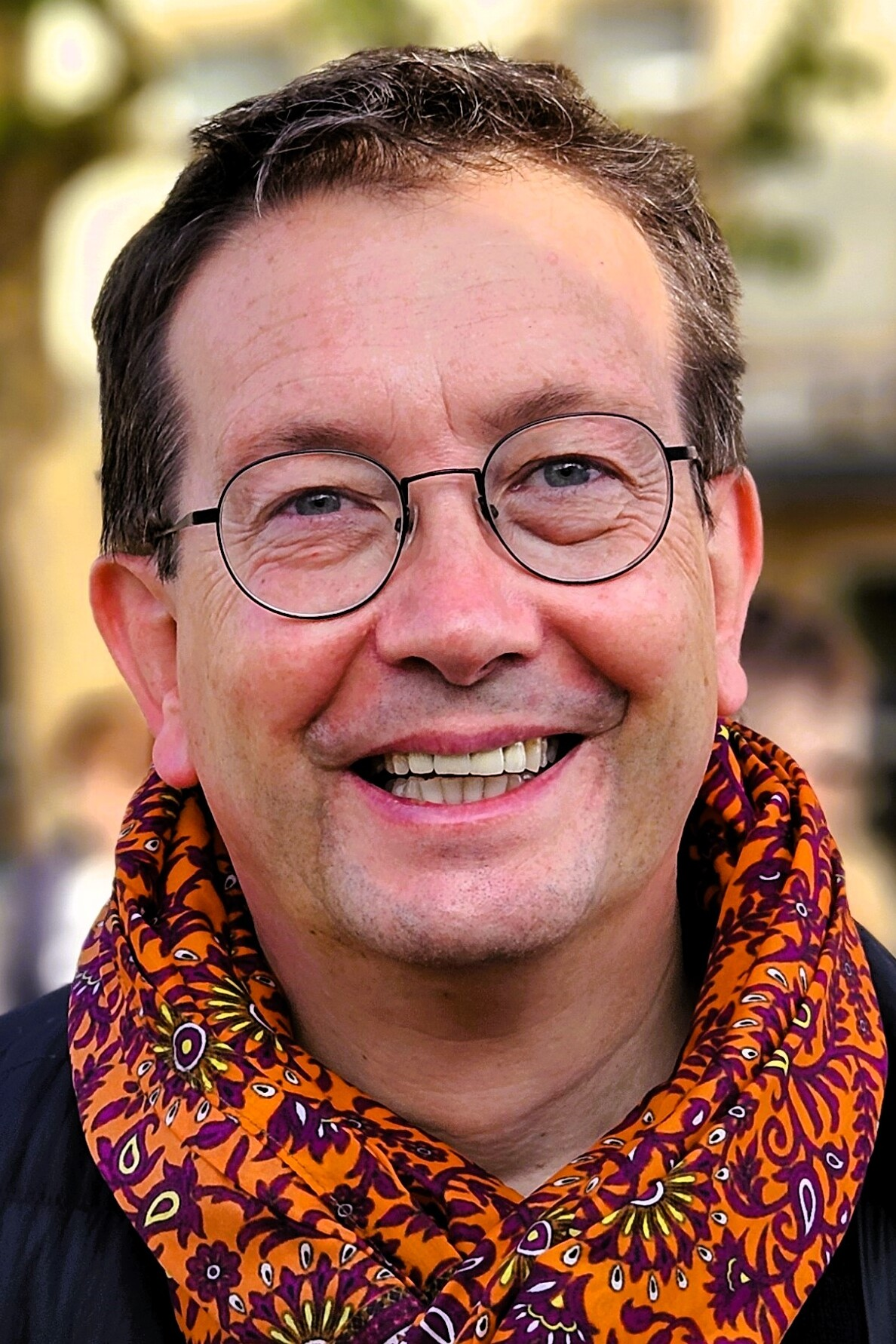

Member of the Chamber of Deputies
- Incumbent
- Assumed office 21 November 2023
- Preceded by: Luc Frieden
- Constituency: Centre

Chief Alderman of Luxembourg City
- Incumbent
- Assumed office 7 December 2023
- Mayor: Lydie Polfer
- Preceded by: Serge Wilmes

Personal details
- Born: 11 October 1971 (age 55) Luxembourg City, Luxembourg
- Party: Christian Social People's Party

Maurice Bauer (born 11 October 1971) is a Luxembourgish politician. He has served as a member of the Chamber of Deputies from Centre, since 2023. He is also the chief alderman of Luxembourg City.
