= Ben Streff =

Luxembourgish politician (born 1995)

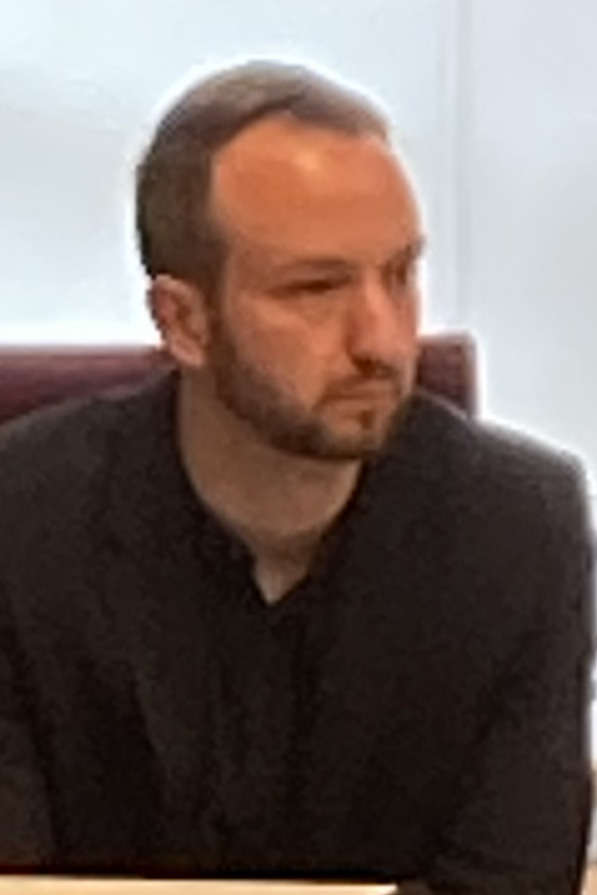
- Streff in 2026

Member of the Chamber of Deputies
- Incumbent
- Assumed office 9 June 2026
- Preceded by: Paulette Lenert
- Constituency: East

Communal councillor of Berdorf
- Incumbent
- Assumed office 2 November 2023

Personal details
- Born: 30 January 1995 (age 31) Luxembourg City, Luxembourg
- Party: Luxembourg Socialist Workers' Party (since 2009)

Ben Streff (born 30 January 1995) is a Luxembourgish politician of the Luxembourg Socialist Workers' Party (LSAP). He has served as a member of the Chamber of Deputies for the East constituency since 2026, as well as a member of the communal council of Berdorf since 2023.

== Biography ==
Streff joined the Luxembourg Socialist Workers' Party (LSAP) in 2009, aged 14, and became the president of the party's newly founded East constituency youth wing in 2012. He then became president of the LSAP East in April 2021, and was appointed as party manager in June 2022, with his role entailing the organisation of the campaigns for the June 2023 communal and October 2023 general elections.

In 2023, Streff ran in the communal election in his hometown of Berdorf, as well as in the general election in the East constituency. Due to the death of a candidate, the communal election in Berdorf was delayed from 11 June to 8 October 2023, the same day as the general election. Streff came second in both, being elected to the Berdorf communal council, but failing to be directly elected to the Chamber of Deputies, as the LSAP only won one seat in the East, with then-deputy prime minister and national lead candidate Paulette Lenert being elected.

In January 2026, shortly before leaving his post as party manager to work for the Ministry of Education, Streff criticised several LSAP figures during an interview on RTL Lëtzebuerg. Among these were parliamentary leader Taina Bofferding, whom he criticised for not sufficiently pushing forward socialist ideas, and ministers-turned-MPs, saying "they should leave their bubbles and be on the ground more ... I expect an MP to give 200% every day". Speaking to d'Lëtzebuerger Land, MP and former minister Paulette Lenert responded to Streff's comments, replying "I find it quite rich to be expecting that from somebody ... Let him give 200% for a few years, then we'll talk".

In May 2026, the Chamber of Deputies nominated Lenert for the Council of State; due to incompatibility rules, she resigned from the Chamber, with Streff next in line to take her seat. In an interview for RTL, he stated that he would "gladly give 300% as a future MP", and that his approach would be "doing politics for citizens rather than representing grand ideologies".

Streff was sworn in to the Chamber of Deputies on 9 June 2026 at age 31. As a new MP, he criticised the Frieden-Bettel Government for "never clearly set[ting] out its own clear vision", and stated that the key priorities in his view were pension reform and the tackling of Luxembourg's housing crisis.
