= Nathalie Morgenthaler =

Luxembourgish politician (born 1979)

The Honourable Nathalie Morgenthaler
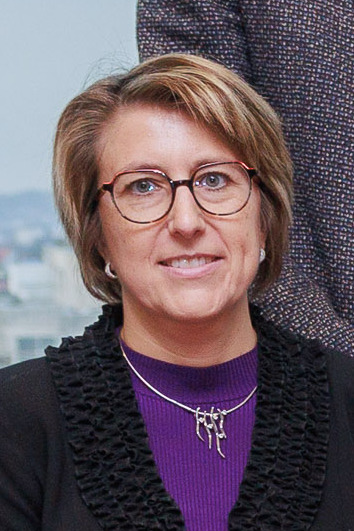
- Morgenthaler in 2024

Member of the Chamber of Deputies
- Incumbent
- Assumed office 21 November 2023
- Preceded by: Gilles Roth
- Constituency: South

Personal details
- Born: 9 October 1979 (age 46) Esch-sur-Alzette, Luxembourg
- Party: Christian Social People's Party

Nathalie Morgenthaler (born 9 October 1979) is a Luxembourgish politician. Since 2023, she has served as a member of the Chamber of Deputies from South, succeeding Gilles Roth who resigned to join the government.
