= Yuriko Backes =

Luxembourgish diplomat and politician (born 1970)

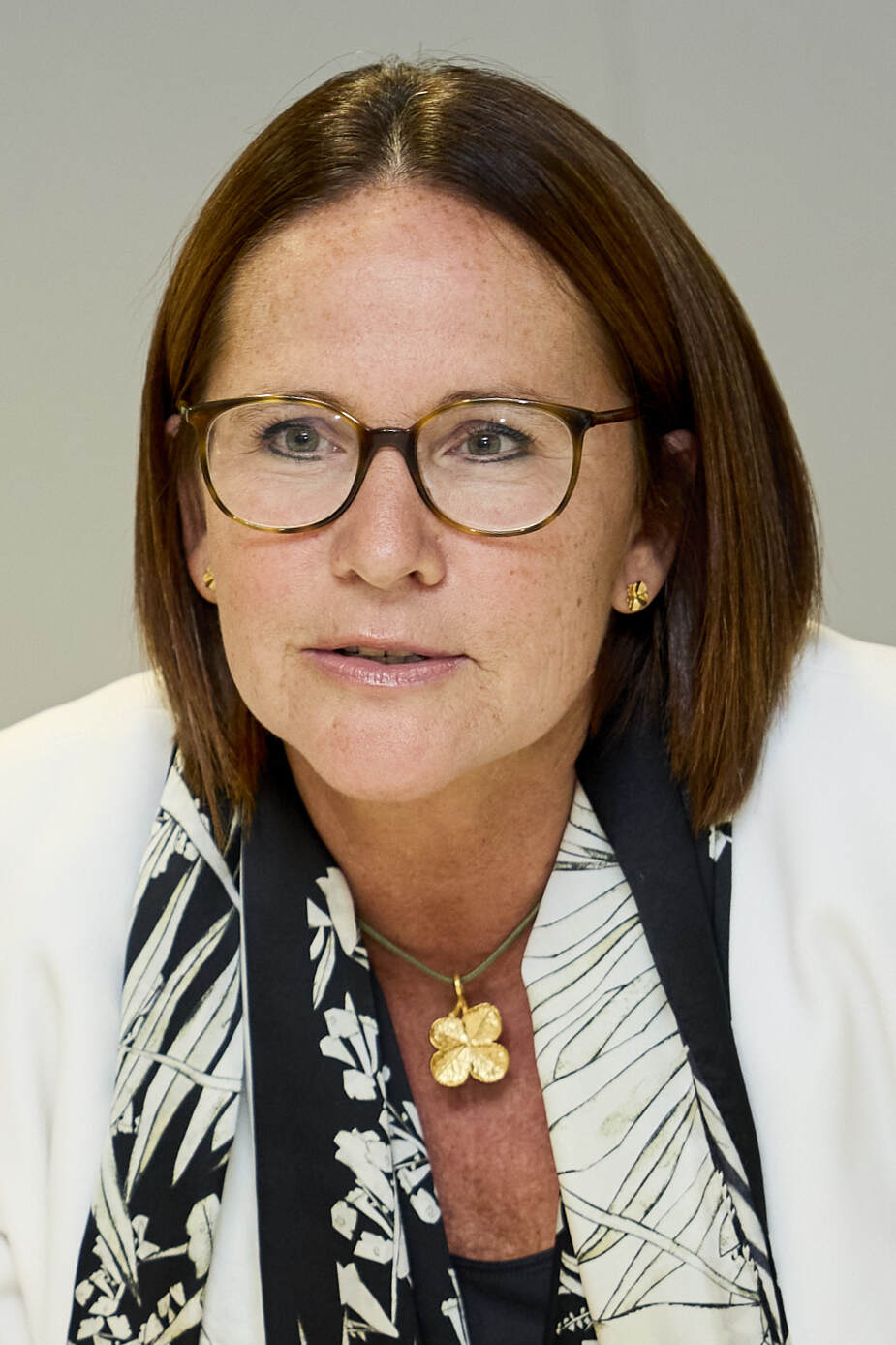
- Backes in 2025

Minister for Mobility and Public Works Minister for Defence
- Incumbent
- Assumed office 17 November 2023
- Prime Minister: Luc Frieden
- Government: Frieden-Bettel
- Preceded by: François Bausch

Minister for Gender Equality and Diversity
- Incumbent
- Assumed office 17 November 2023
- Prime Minister: Luc Frieden
- Government: Frieden-Bettel
- Preceded by: Taina Bofferding

Minister for Finances
- In office 5 January 2022 – 17 November 2023
- Prime Minister: Xavier Bettel
- Government: Bettel II
- Preceded by: Pierre Gramegna
- Succeeded by: Gilles Roth

Marshal of the Grand Ducal Court
- In office 1 June 2020 – 5 January 2022
- Monarch: Henri
- Preceded by: Lucien Weiler
- Succeeded by: Paul Dühr

Personal details
- Born: 22 December 1970 (age 55) Kobe, Japan
- Party: Democratic Party (since 2021); Independent (until 2021)
- Other political affiliations: Alliance of Liberals and Democrats for Europe Party
- Children: 2
- Education: London School of Economics; SOAS University of London; College of Europe

Yuriko Nadia Backes (Luxembourgish pronunciation: ['juʀikoː 'bɑkəs]; born 22 December 1970) is a Luxembourgish diplomat and politician who serves as Minister for Defence and Minister for Mobility and Public Works since 2023. She served as Minister for Finances from 2022 to 2023. A member of the Democratic Party, she has led the nation's financial sector through the economic crisis caused by the inflation surge and the Russian invasion of Ukraine. Prior to her appointment as minister, she held several key diplomatic positions, and was the diplomatic advisor to prime ministers Jean-Claude Juncker and Xavier Bettel.

== Early life and education ==
Yuriko Nadia Backes was born on 22 December 1970 in Kobe, Japan. Her parents were Luxembourgish expatriate workers who lived in Japan. After briefly living in Germany, the family returned to Japan, residing in the Tokyo area for eleven years. Backes attended the Canadian Academy International School in Kobe, graduating in 1989 with an International Baccalaureate diploma. She continued her studies in London, graduating from the London School of Economics with a bachelor's degree in international relations in 1992 and from the School of Oriental and African Studies with a master's degree in Japanese studies in 1993. The following year, she received a master's degree in European political and administrative studies from the College of Europe in Bruges.

== Diplomatic career ==
Backes began her diplomatic career within the Luxembourg Ministry of Foreign Affairs in 1994, when she passed her diplomatic examinations and was appointed a member of the permanent representation of Luxembourg to the United Nations, serving for three years. In 2001, she was named deputy director of the Directorate of European Affairs and International Economic Relations in the Ministry of Foreign Affairs. From 2001 until 2006, Backes was a member of the permanent representation of Luxembourg to the European Union, and from 2006 until 2008, she was the deputy head of mission of the Embassy of Luxembourg in Japan.

From 2008 to 2010, Backes was deputy head of the Directorate for International Economic Relations at the Ministry of Foreign Affairs. From 2010 until June 2016, she was the diplomatic adviser for prime ministers Jean-Claude Juncker and Xavier Bettel. From 2016 until 2020, she was the representative of the European Commission to Luxembourg, becoming the first woman to hold the office.

On 1 June 2020, Backes was appointed Luxembourg's first female Hofmarschall (French: Maréchale de la Cour, English: Marshal of the Court), the highest administrative position in the household of Grand Duke Henri. In this role, she oversaw and organized the day-to-day activities of the Grand Duke.

== Political career ==
=== Finance minister ===
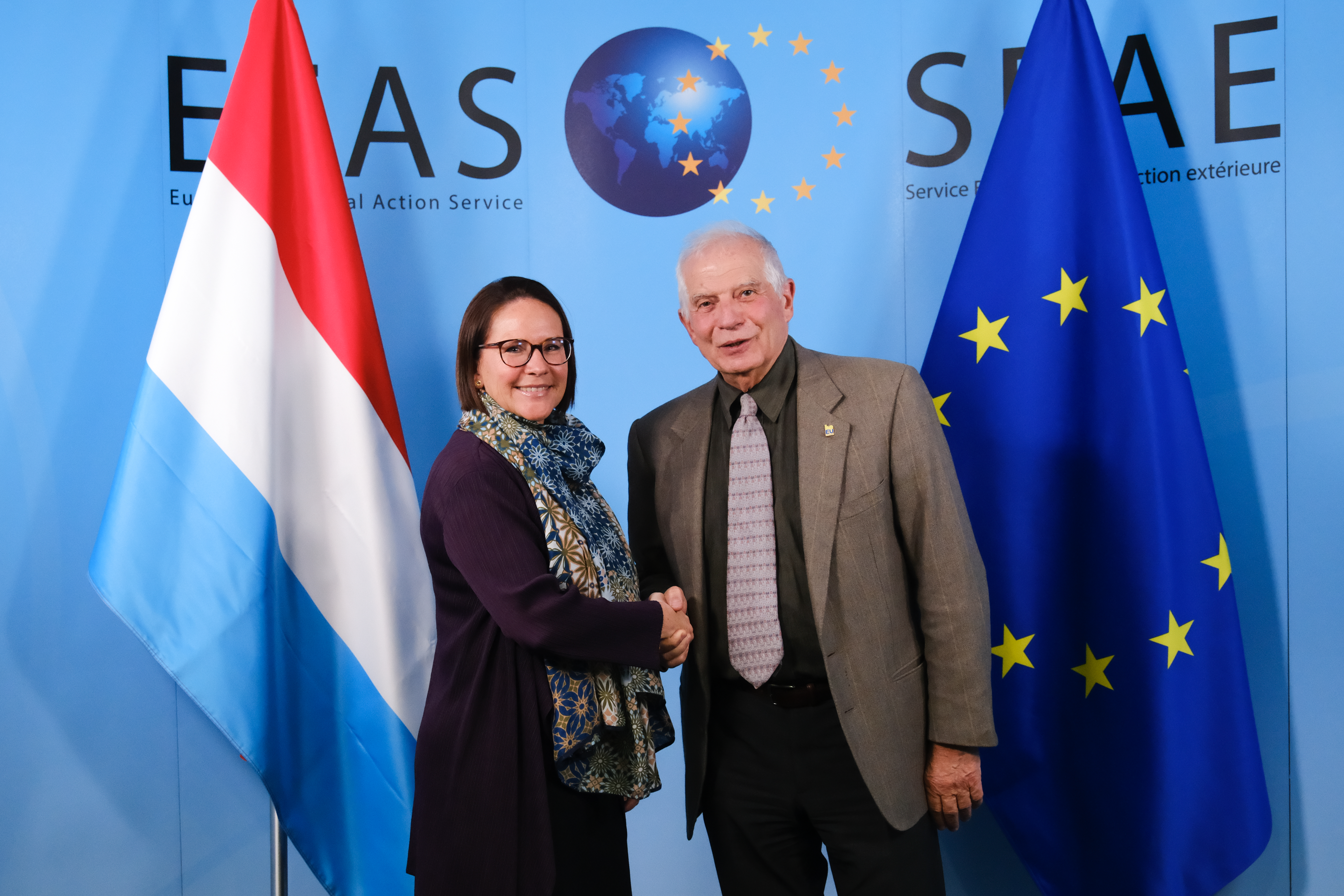
Backes with Josep Borrell in 2024.

On 3 December 2021, the ruling coalition government announced that Backes would become the new Minister for Finances, succeeding Pierre Gramegna and becoming the first woman to hold the office. Previously unaffiliated with any political party, she declared her intent to join the Democratic Party and run as one of its candidates for the Chamber of Deputies in the 2023 elections. Backes is also affiliated with the Alliance of Liberals and Democrats for Europe Party. She was sworn in by Grand Duke Henri on 5 January 2022.

Though initially intending her tenure to operate ad interim with a "simple" economic framework, the Russian invasion of Ukraine, which began the month after she took office, exasperated Luxembourg's ongoing inflation crisis. A proponent of European solidarity against Russia, Backes is an outspoken supporter of Ukraine. At the April 2022 IMF/World Bank summit in Washington, D.C., she "underlined Luxembourg's commitment to multilateralism and international solidarity" and "reaffirmed Luxembourg's pledge to allocate 1% of its GNI to development aid". She also reiterated Luxembourg's support for Ukraine during a meeting with Ukrainian finance minister Serhiy Marchenko.

Backes is also a proponent of closer relations between Luxembourg and Asia. In April 2022, she met with several Japanese CEOs regarding economic cooperation between the two nations. In May 2023, she travelled to China, where she held meetings with finance minister Liu Kun, China Securities Regulatory Commission chairman Yi Huiman, and several Chinese bank officials. Among the topics of discussion were capital market cooperation, green finance, and Luxembourg's desire to strengthen diplomatic and economic ties with China.

In 2023, Backes declared that Luxembourg was in the midst of an economic crisis primarily caused by inflation. Though she opposed a decrease in the tax rate, she instead backing a proposal which would distribute targeted tax credits totaling €500 million as a response to the crisis. She also oversaw a 1% reduction in the value-added tax as part of an inflation-reduction measure, as well as the implementation of international taxation on multinational corporations based in Luxembourg, which affected around 7,500 firms. In December 2022, her proposed budget, which "avoided austerity" while keeping investment and solidarity spending high, passed through the legislature and allowed Luxembourg to retain its AAA credit rating from Fitch Ratings.

In late 2022, Backes highlighted the importance of the fight against money laundering in Luxembourg, stating that failing an audit from the Financial Action Task Force would "permanently compromise Luxembourg's reputation as a financial centre". She is also a supporter of the digital transformation and the Digital Services Act.

=== 2023 General Election ===
On 13 July 2023, Backes was presented as part of the leading candidates double for her voting constituency (Centre), together with national leading candidate Xavier Bettel for the general election. She was elected to the Chamber of Deputies with 23 589 votes, the second most votes of all DP candidates on a national level. After Luc Frieden was appointed government formateur by Grand Duke Henri on 10 October, CSV and DP conducted coalition negotiations, with Backes as a member of the DP delegation.

On 17 November 2023, Backes was sworn in with the rest of the Frieden-Bettel-government. She has three new portfolios: Mobility and Public Works; Defense; and Gender Equality and Diversity. The accumulation and combination of portfolios was described by commentators as unexpected. Backes is the only minister in the Frieden-Bettel government to manage three portfolios.

== Personal life ==
Backes has two children. She is fluent in Luxembourgish, German, French, and English, and is conversational in Japanese.
