= Jeff Boonen =

Luxembourgish politician (born 1985)

The Honourable Jeff Boonen
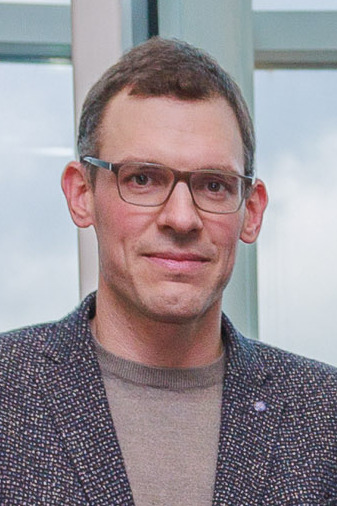

Member of the Chamber of Deputies
- Incumbent
- Assumed office 21 November 2023
- Constituency: North

Personal details
- Born: 1 June 1985 (age 40) Luxembourg City, Luxembourg

Jeff Boonen (born 1 June 1985) is a Luxembourgish politician and farmer. A member of the Christian Social People's Party, he has served as a member of the Chamber of Deputies representing the North since 2023.
