= Xavier Bettel =

Luxembourgish politician (born 1973)

The Honourable Xavier Bettel
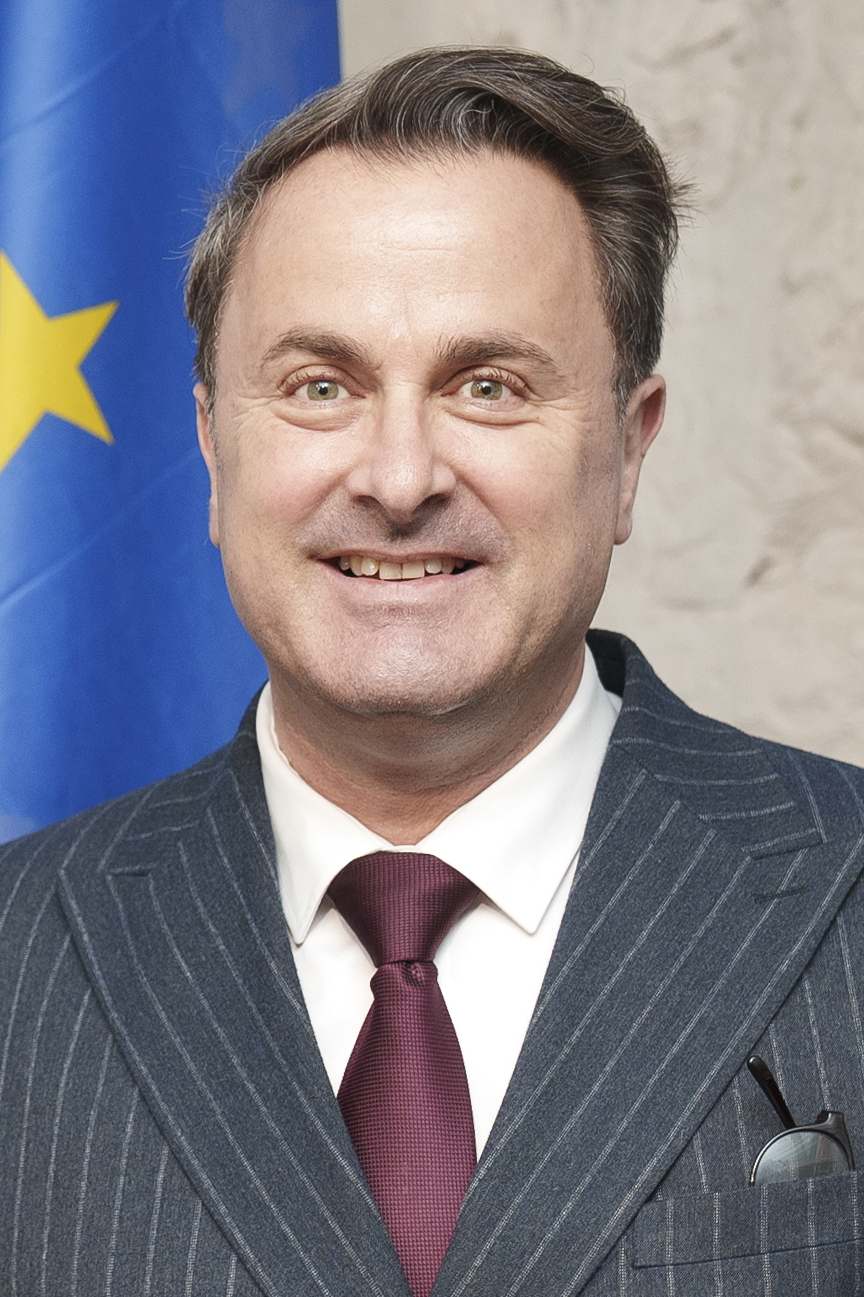
- Bettel in 2025

Deputy Prime Minister of Luxembourg
- Incumbent
- Assumed office 17 November 2023
- Prime Minister: Luc Frieden
- Government: Frieden-Bettel
- Preceded by: François Bausch; Paulette Lenert

Minister for Foreign Affairs
- Incumbent
- Assumed office 17 November 2023
- Prime Minister: Luc Frieden
- Government: Frieden-Bettel
- Preceded by: Jean Asselborn

President of the Committee of Ministers of the Council of Europe
- In office 17 November 2024 – 14 May 2025
- Preceded by: Gabrielius Landsbergis
- Succeeded by: Ian Borg

Prime Minister of Luxembourg
- In office 4 December 2013 – 17 November 2023
- Monarch: Henri
- Deputy: Étienne Schneider; Félix Braz; François Bausch; Dan Kersch; Paulette Lenert
- Government: Bettel I and II
- Preceded by: Jean-Claude Juncker
- Succeeded by: Luc Frieden

Minister for Communications and Media
- In office 4 December 2013 – 17 November 2023
- Prime Minister: Himself
- Government: Bettel I and II
- Preceded by: Luc Frieden
- Succeeded by: Elisabeth Margue

Minister for Culture
- In office 17 December 2015 – 5 December 2018
- Prime Minister: Himself
- Government: Bettel I
- Preceded by: Maggy Nagel
- Succeeded by: Sam Tanson

Mayor of Luxembourg City
- In office 24 November 2011 – 4 December 2013
- Preceded by: Paul Helminger
- Succeeded by: Lydie Polfer

Member of the Chamber of Deputies
- In office 12 August 1999 – 4 December 2013
- Succeeded by: Frank Colabianchi
- Constituency: Centre

Personal details
- Born: 3 March 1973 (age 53) Luxembourg City, Luxembourg
- Party: Democratic Party (1988–present)
- Spouse: Gauthier Destenay (m. 2015)
- Education: Aristotle University of Thessaloniki (Erasmus Programme); Nancy 2 University
- Profession: Lawyer; Politician

Xavier Bettel (Note: Luxembourgish pronunciation: [ˈksɑvieː ˈbətəl]) (born 3 March 1973) is a Luxembourgish lawyer and politician who serves as the deputy prime minister of Luxembourg and as the minister for Foreign Affairs since 2023. He served as the prime minister of Luxembourg from 2013 to 2023. He was a member of the Chamber of Deputies from 1999 to 2013 and mayor of Luxembourg City from 2011 to 2013.

Bettel is a member of the Democratic Party (DP). Following the 2013 general election, he took office as prime minister and succeeded Jean-Claude Juncker of the Christian Social People's Party (CSV). He became the first openly gay prime minister in the world to serve a second term in 2018, when his mandate was renewed.

He was appointed deputy prime minister in 2023 in the Frieden-Bettel Government. He received the most personal votes in the 2023 elections and is frequently ranked as the most popular politician in the country, with a popularity rating of 80% as of a December 2025 poll.

== Early life ==
Bettel was born on 3 March 1973 in the Luxembourg City district of Bonnevoie and grew up in Crauthem. His father, Claude Bettel (1939-1999), was a French transport entrepreneur of Luxembourgish origin who moved to Luxembourg in 1971, eventually joining the DP and becoming a member of the Luxembourgish National Council for Foreigners. Bettel has said he has an Orthodox Russian grandfather and a Polish-Jewish grandfather, while his parents were Catholics. He also has Moldovan roots. His mother Aniela (born 1943), a former bank manager, daughter of Maurice Spiro (1892-1988) and Vera Rachmaninoff (1912-1997), is a granddaughter of Arkady Rachmaninoff, younger brother of the Russian composer Sergei Rachmaninoff. After completing his secondary school studies at Lycée Hélène Boucher in Thionville, Bettel obtained a master's degree in Public and European Law and a DEA in Political Science and Public Law from Nancy 2 University in Nancy, France. He also studied maritime law as well as canon law at Aristotle University in Thessaloniki, Greece, where he was studying thanks to the Erasmus Programme. Bettel joined the DP in 1988 at age 15, and became the president of the party's youth wing in 1993. For four years in the early 2000s, he hosted Sonndes em 8, a weekly talkshow, on the now-defunct private T.TV television network. In 2017, he also received an honorary doctorate from Sacred Heart University Luxembourg.

== Municipal politics (1999-2013) ==
In the elections of 1999, Bettel was elected to Luxembourg City's communal council, finishing sixth on the DP's list. Two years after his election to the local council, on 12 July 2001, he was certified as a lawyer. On 28 November 2005, after the municipal elections in which he was placed fourth on the DP list, Bettel was appointed échevin (alderman) in the council of Luxembourg City.

Following municipal elections on 9 October 2011, Bettel was sworn in as Mayor of Luxembourg on 24 November 2011. He resigned from his position as DP leader in the Chamber of Deputies, which he had held since 2009.

== Chamber of Deputies (1999-2013) ==
Bettel ran for the Chamber of Deputies in the 1999 general election; he finished tenth amongst DP candidates in the Centre constituency, with the top seven being elected. However, the DP overtook the Luxembourg Socialist Workers' Party (LSAP) as the second-largest party; its members formed the majority of the new government as the Christian Social People's Party's (CSV) coalition partners. Thus, with Lydie Polfer and Anne Brasseur vacating their seats to take roles in the government, as well as Colette Flesch not taking her seat so as to focus on her role as Member of the European Parliament (MEP), Bettel was sworn in to the Chamber of Deputies on 12 August 1999. Aged 26, he was the youngest deputy at the time.

By the time of the 2004 general election, Bettel had significantly consolidated his position; he finished fourth (of the five DP members elected), assuring him a seat in the Chamber of Deputies.

== Premiership (2013–2023) ==
=== First term ===
In 2013, Bettel was elected leader of the Democratic Party. In the 2013 general election, he led the party to a third-ranked position in parliamentary seats. On 25 October, Bettel was designated by Grand Duke Henri as the formateur for the next government. He assumed his post as Luxembourg's Prime Minister on 4 December 2013. In the government's coalition of the DP, LSAP, and The Greens, he led the cabinet with LSAP leader Etienne Schneider serving as Deputy Prime Minister. In his first term, he also held the functions of Minister of State, Minister for Communications and the Media, Minister for Culture, and Minister for Religious Affairs.

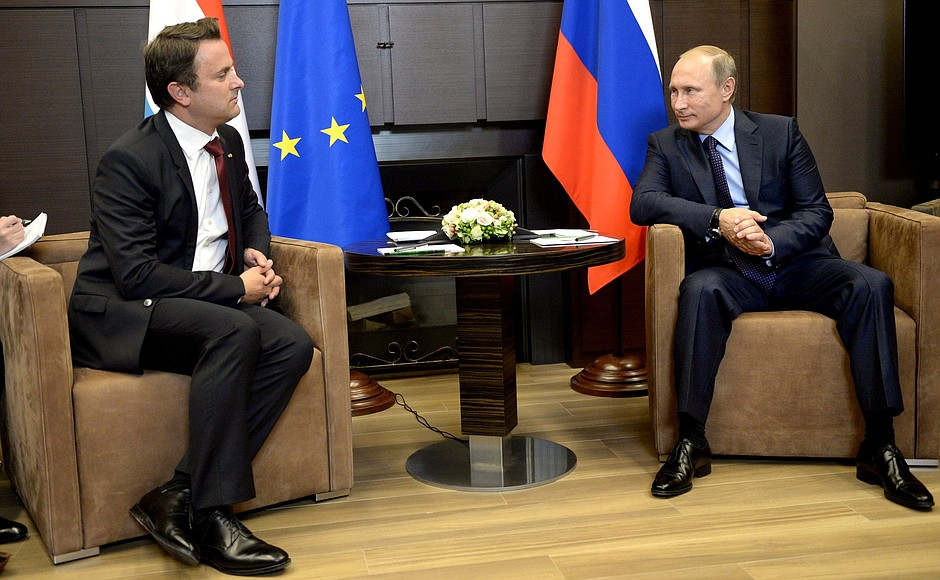
Xavier Bettel and President Vladimir Putin (6 October 2015)

=== Second term ===
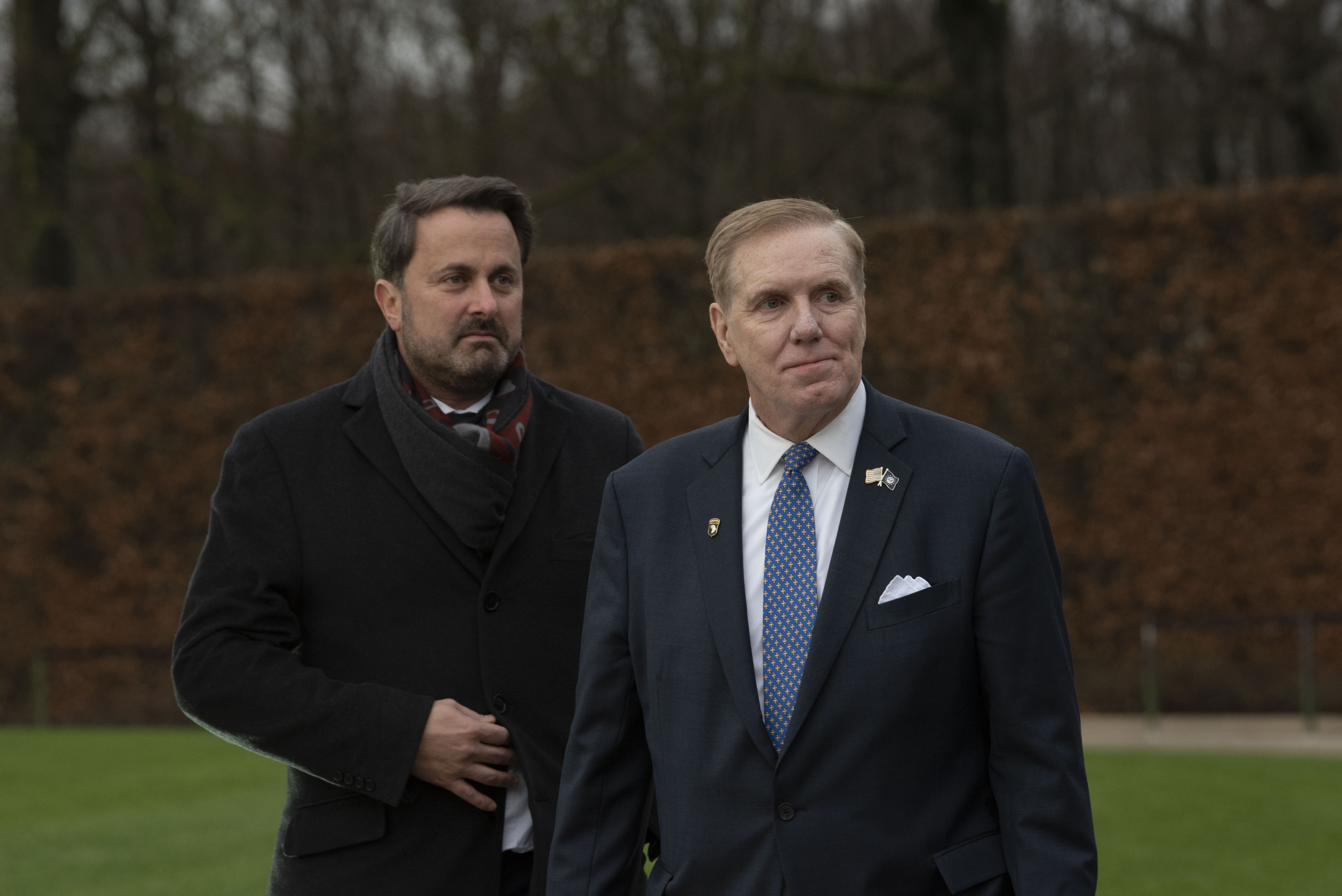
Bettel and US Ambassador Randy Evans at the Luxembourg American Cemetery and Memorial, for the 75th anniversary of the Battle of the Bulge, on 16 December 2019

Following the 2018 election, he became the first openly gay prime minister in the world to be reappointed for a second term. He began his second term when his government was formed on 5 December 2018, which he led with co-Deputy Prime Ministers François Bausch and Dan Kersch. The government is a continuation between the Democratic Party, the Luxembourg Socialist Workers' Party, and The Greens from the Bettel I government, with minor changes.

On 16 September 2019, following a short bilateral meeting on the status of Brexit negotiations, Bettel continued a press conference without British Prime Minister Boris Johnson, after Johnson abruptly pulled out due to an anti-Brexit protest held by British citizens living in Luxembourg. Bettel gestured towards Johnson's empty podium and confirmed that the UK Government had not tabled any concrete proposals for amendments to the UK's Withdrawal Agreement, particularly the "Irish backstop" that Johnson wished to replace. This being despite the public pronouncements of Prime Minister Johnson and the UK's departure date from the EU fast approaching. Pro-Brexit UK media reported the matter as an ambush, whilst other UK and international media outlets largely saw the incident, as well as the reaction of pro-Brexit UK media outlets to it, as confirming the increasing hypersensitivity of pro-Brexit pundits and politicians to criticism.

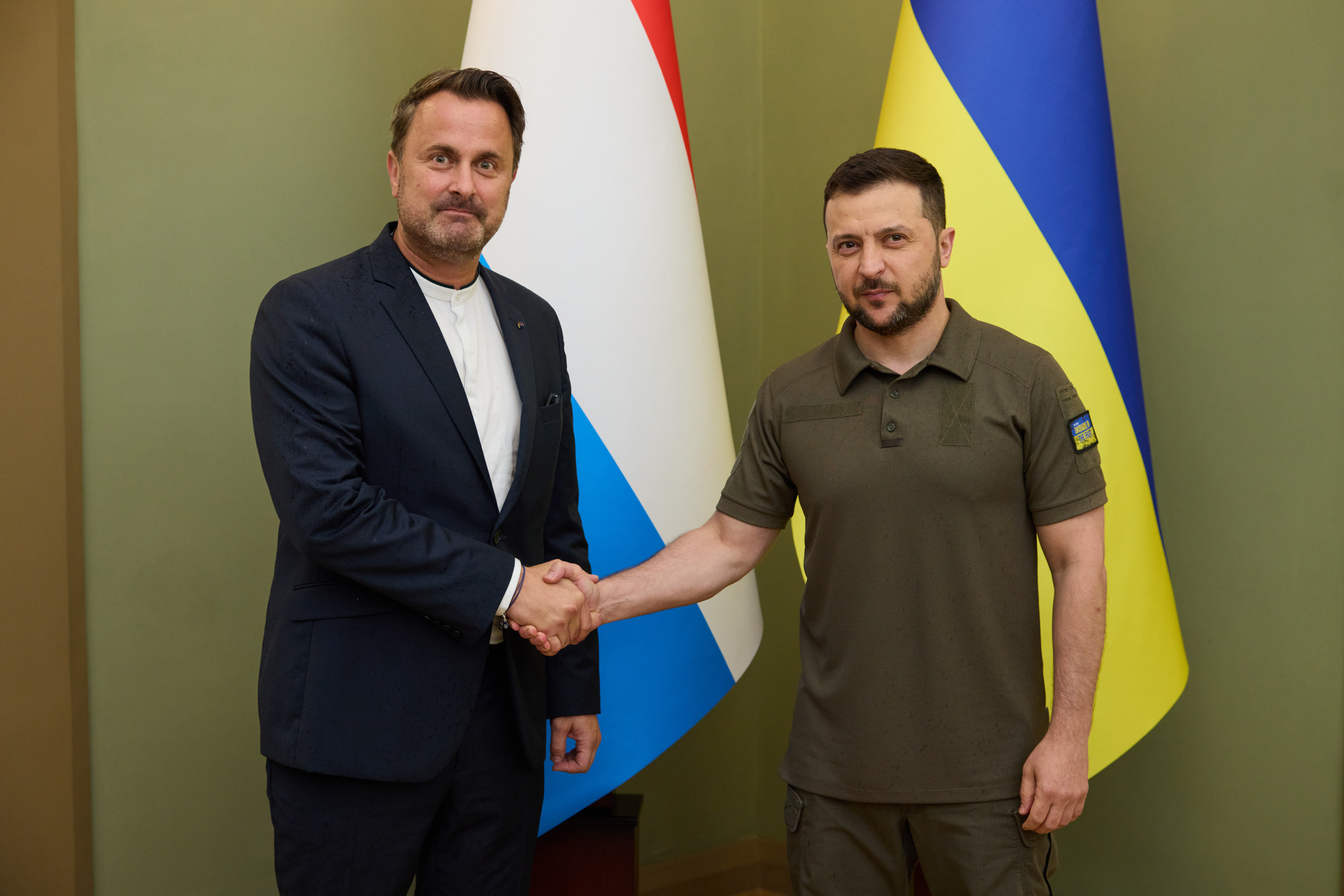
Xavier Bettel with Ukrainian President Volodymyr Zelenskyy in Kyiv on 21 June 2022

On 29 February 2020, all of Luxembourg's public transport became free of charge as a result of the Bettel II government coalition agreement.

== Deputy premiership (2023–present) ==
Bettel was appointed Deputy Prime Minister in the Frieden-Bettel Government, after the coalition lost the 2023 election and only gained 29 seats. A new coalition government emerged between the CSV and DP, in which Luc Frieden is the Prime Minister. He is in charge of foreign and European affairs, development cooperation, foreign trade, as well as the Greater region.

In February 2024, Bettel told Israel they risked losing "the last support they have in the world" if they attacked Rafah.

== Personal life ==
Bettel, who is openly gay, has stated that increasingly in Luxembourg "people do not consider the fact of whether someone is gay or not". Bettel was Luxembourg's first openly gay Prime Minister. Worldwide, he was the third openly gay head of government following Iceland's Prime Minister Jóhanna Sigurðardóttir (2009–2013) and Belgium's Prime Minister Elio Di Rupo (2011–2014). He was one of four openly gay world leaders in office, the others being the Prime Minister of Serbia Ana Brnabić, the Taoiseach of Ireland Leo Varadkar, and the President of Latvia Edgars Rinkēvičs.

Bettel has been married to Gauthier Destenay since 2015, the same year that same-sex marriage was introduced in Luxembourg.

=== COVID-19 hospitalisation ===
On 4 July 2021, Bettel was admitted to hospital following a COVID-19 diagnosis on 27 June. The move was initially described as precautionary and for tests. It was reported that he experienced "mild symptoms" such as high temperature and headache. The following day, it was reported that he was in a "serious but stable" condition and would remain hospitalised. On 7 July 2021, the government said that Bettel would remain hospitalised a "little bit longer" due to low saturation of oxygen in his blood and that he was recovering "little by little". On 8 July 2021, Bettel was discharged from hospital. It was announced he would resume activities soon via remote work for the rest of his isolation period. Bettel thanked health authorities for the treatment during his hospitalisation period.

== Honours and awards ==
| Award or decoration | | Country | Date |
| Ribbon | Name | Country | Date |
|---|---|---|---|
| | Order of Civil Merit | Spain | 2007 |
| | Order of Orange-Nassau (Knight Grand Officer) | Netherlands | 2012 |
| | Order of the Oak Crown (Knight Grand cross) | Luxembourg | 2014 |
| | Order of the Legion of Honour (Commander) | France | 2015 |
| | Order of the Crown (Knight Grand Cross) | Belgium | 2017 |
| | Order of Prince Henry (Grand Cross) | Portugal | 2017 |
| | Order of the Cross of Terra Mariana (Grand Cross) | Estonia | 2018 |
| | Order of Orange-Nassau (Knight Grand Cross) | Netherlands | 2018 |
| | Order of the Republic of Serbia (Grand Cross) | Serbia | 2020 |
| Order of Makarios III (Cyprus) - ribbon bar | Order of Makarios III (Grand Cross) | Cyprus | 2022 |
| GRE Order of Honour Grand Cross BAR | Order of Honour (Grand Cross) | Greece | 2023 |
| GRE Order of Honour Grand Cross BAR | Order of Isabella the Catholic (Knight Grand Cross) | Spain | 2026 |

== Allegations of plagiarism ==
"In [Bettel's] thesis at the University of Nancy there is not one correct reference," wrote Pol Reuter with reference to research by Reporter.lu. The master's thesis, submitted in 1999, is dedicated to the topic of electoral reform at the European Parliament. Allegedly, only two of the total 56 pages were free of plagiarism. The plagiarism findings are said to have been confirmed by several independent researchers. Bettel stated he wrote this thesis with a clear conscience, although "from today's standpoint, it could have – yes, maybe should have – been done differently." On 1 February 2022, he announced in a press release from the State Ministry that he was asking the university to revoke his DEA (Diplôme d'études approfondies). The day before, the university had requested that he provide the missing source references in his thesis.

== See also ==
- Bettel I (2013–2018)
- Bettel II (2018–2023)
- List of openly LGBT heads of state and government
- List of the first LGBT holders of political offices

Political offices
| Preceded by Paul Helminger | Mayor of Luxembourg City; 2011–2013 | Succeeded by Lydie Polfer |
| Preceded by François Biltgen | Minister for Communications and Media; 2013–2023 | Succeeded by Luc Frieden; Elisabeth Margue |
| Preceded by François Biltgen | Minister for Religious Affairs; 2013–2023 | Succeeded by Luc Frieden; Elisabeth Margue |
| Preceded by Jean-Claude Juncker | Prime Minister of Luxembourg; 2013–2023 | Succeeded by Luc Frieden |
| Preceded by Jean Asselborn | Minister for Foreign Affairs; 2023–present | Incumbent |
Party political offices
| Preceded by Claude Meisch | Leader of the Democratic Party; 2013–2015 | Succeeded by Corinne Cahen |
