= Frieden-Bettel Government =

35th and current government of the Grand Duchy of Luxembourg

- Cabinet of Luxembourg
- 2023–present
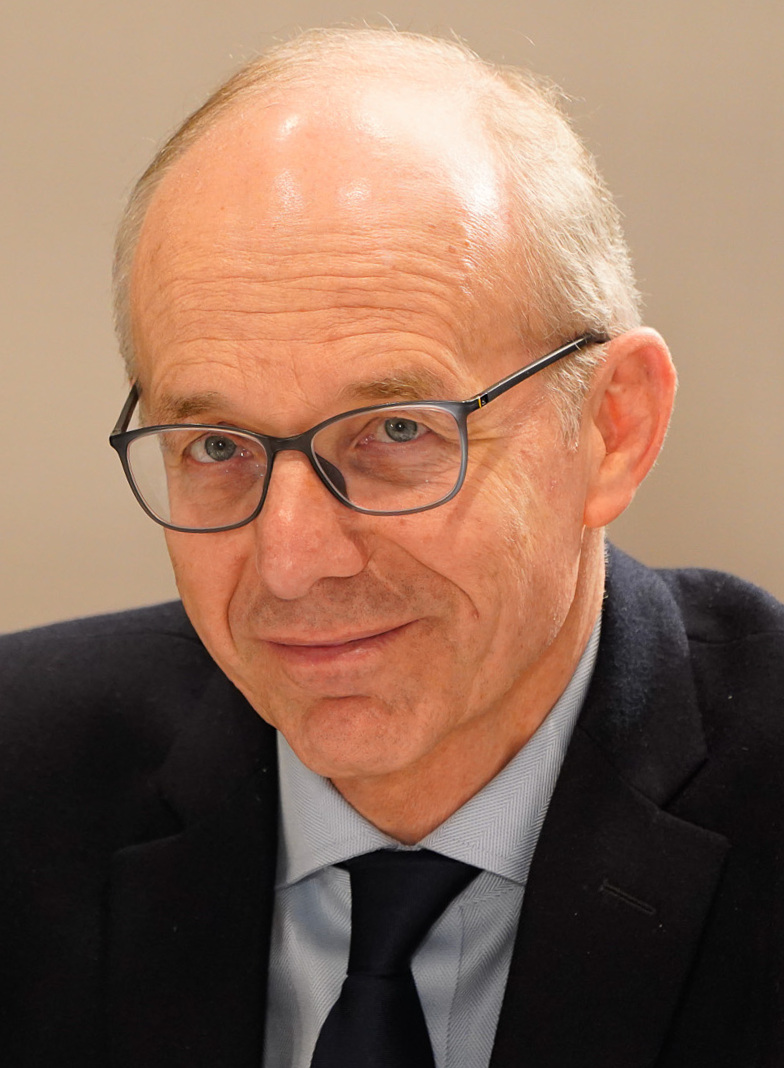
- Date formed: 17 November 2023 (2 years, 7 months, 3 weeks and 2 days)

People and organisations
- Grand Duke: Henri (2023-2025); Guillaume V (2025-present)
- Prime Minister: Luc Frieden
- Deputy Prime Minister: Xavier Bettel
- No. of ministers: 15
- Member parties: CSV; DP
- Status in legislature: Majority government (coalition)
- Opposition parties: LSAP; ADR; Greens; Pirates; The Left
- Opposition leader: Taina Bofferding (Note: De facto leader of the opposition as the leader of the largest opposition group in the Chamber of Deputes.)

History
- Election: 2023 general election
- Legislature term: 35th legislature of the Chamber of Deputies
- Predecessor: Bettel II Government

The Frieden-Bettel Government is the incumbent government of Luxembourg. It was formed on 17 November 2023 following the 2023 election. It is led by Prime Minister Luc Frieden and Deputy Prime Minister Xavier Bettel. The government is a coalition between the Christian Social People's Party (CSV) and the Democratic Party (DP).

== Overview ==
Composition of the Frieden-Bettel Government since 11 December 2025
| Name | Portrait | Party | Office |
|---|---|---|---|
| Luc Frieden | | CSV | Prime Minister |
| Xavier Bettel | | DP | Deputy Prime Minister; Minister of Foreign Affairs and Foreign Trade; Minister of Development Cooperation and Humanitarian Affairs |
| Martine Hansen | | CSV | Minister of Agriculture, Food and Viticulture; Minister for Consumer Protection; Minister of Sport (Note: Replaced Georges Mischo on 11 December 2025.) |
| Claude Meisch | | DP | Minister of Education, Children and Youth; Minister of Housing and Spatial Planning |
| Lex Delles | | DP | Minister of the Economy, Small and Medium Enterprises, Energy and Tourism |
| Yuriko Backes | | DP | Minister of Defence; Minister for Mobility and Public Works; Minister for Gender Equality and Diversity |
| Max Hahn | | DP | Minister of Family, Solidarity, Living Together and Reception of Refugees |
| Gilles Roth | | CSV | Minister of Finance |
| Martine Deprez | | CSV | Minister of Health and Social Security |
| Léon Gloden | | CSV | Minister for Home Affairs |
| Stéphanie Obertin | | DP | Minister for Digitalization; Minister of Research and Higher Education |
| Marc Spautz | | CSV | Minister of Labour (Note: Replaced Georges Mischo on 11 December 2025.) |
| Serge Wilmes | | CSV | Minister for the Civil Service; Minister of the Environment, Climate and Biodiversity |
| Elisabeth Margue | | CSV | Minister of Justice; Minister Delegate to the Prime Minister for Media and Connectivity Minister Delegate to the Prime Minister for Relations with Parliament |
| Eric Thill | | DP | Minister for Culture; Minister Delegate for Tourism |
