= Jean-Paul Schaaf =

Luxembourgish politician (born 1965)

The Honourable Jean-Paul Schaaf
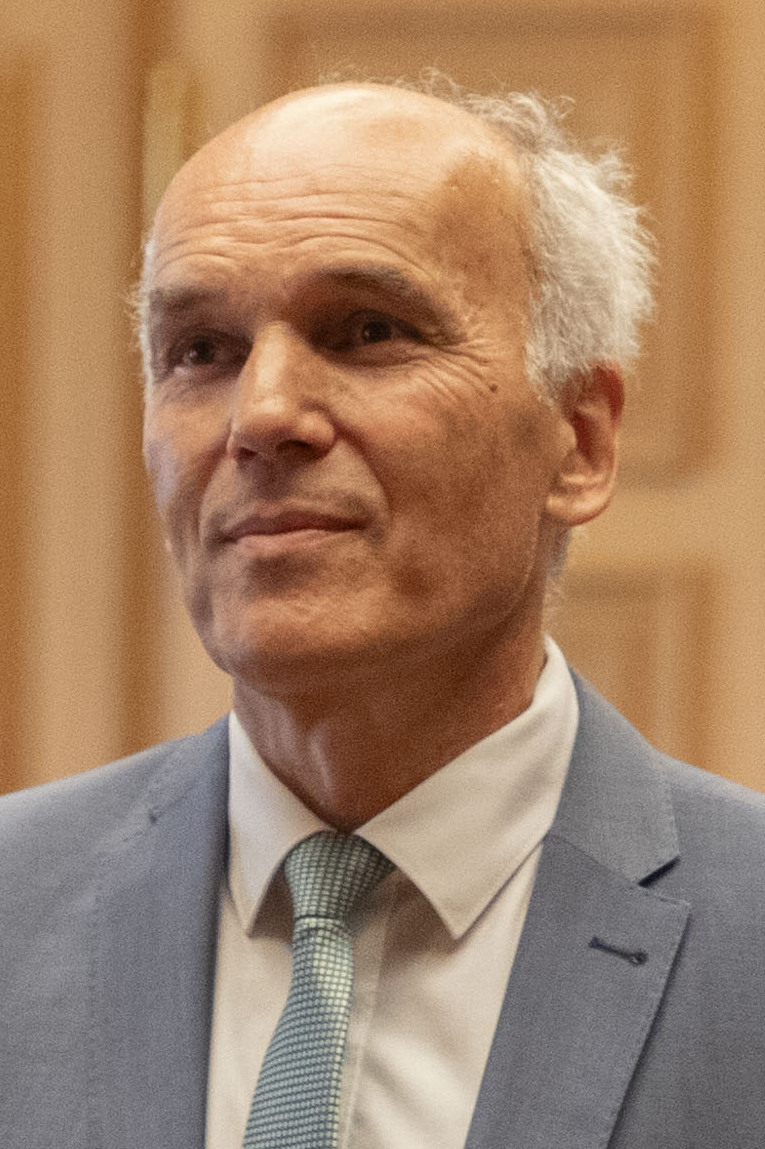

Member of the Chamber of Deputies
- Incumbent
- Assumed office 11 July 2024
- Preceded by: Christophe Hansen
- Constituency: North
- In office 21 October 2020 – 24 October 2023
- Preceded by: Marco Schank
- Constituency: North
- In office 3 August 2004 – 6 October 2013
- Constituency: North

Personal details
- Born: 4 December 1965 (age 60) Ettelbruck, Luxembourg
- Party: Christian Social People's Party

Jean-Paul Schaaf (born 4 December 1965) is a Luxembourgish politician. Since 2024, he has served as a member of the Chamber of Deputies for the North constituency. He previously served for the constituency from 2004 to 2013, and again from 2020 to 2023. Schaaf also served as mayor of Ettelbruck until 2023.
