= Eric Thill =

Luxembourgish politician (born 1993)

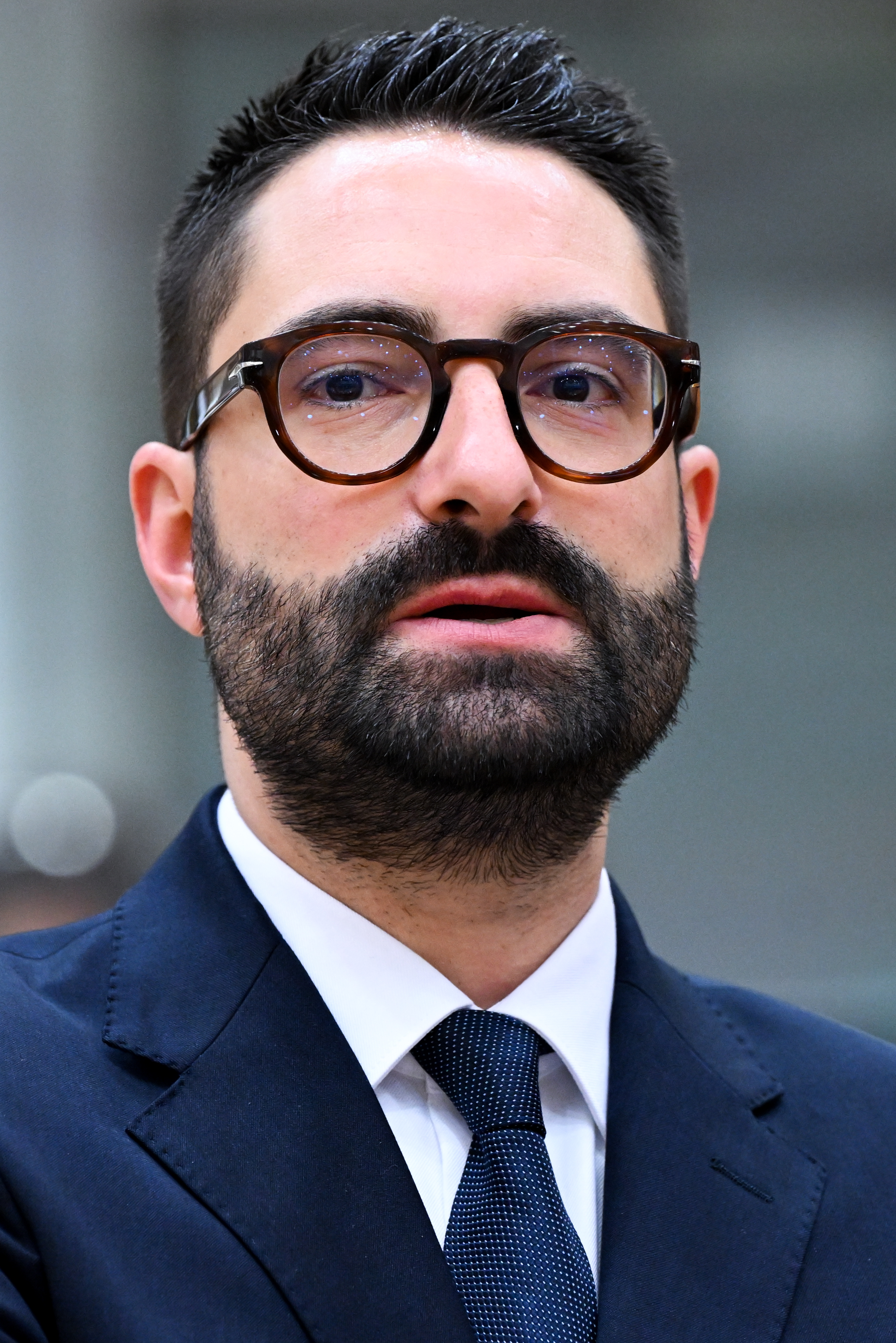
- Thill in 2026

Minister for Culture Minister Delegate for Tourism
- Incumbent
- Assumed office 17 November 2023
- Prime Minister: Luc Frieden
- Government: Frieden-Bettel
- Preceded by: Sam Tanson

Mayor of Schieren
- In office 29 November 2019 – 15 November 2023
- Monarch: Henri
- Preceded by: André Schmit
- Succeeded by: Jean-Paul Zeimes

Personal details
- Born: 27 November 1993 (age 32) Luxembourg City, Luxembourg
- Party: Democratic Party
- Education: University of Luxembourg

Eric Thill (born 27 November 1993) is a Luxembourgish politician of the Democratic Party (DP). He has served as Minister for Culture and Minister Delegate for Tourism since 2023. He took office at age 29, becoming the second-youngest minister in Luxembourg's post-war history. He previously served as mayor of Schieren from 2019 to 2023.

He holds a bachelor's degree in Management and a master's degree in European Governance, which he both obtained at the University of Luxembourg.
