= Paulette Lenert =

Luxembourgish lawyer and politician

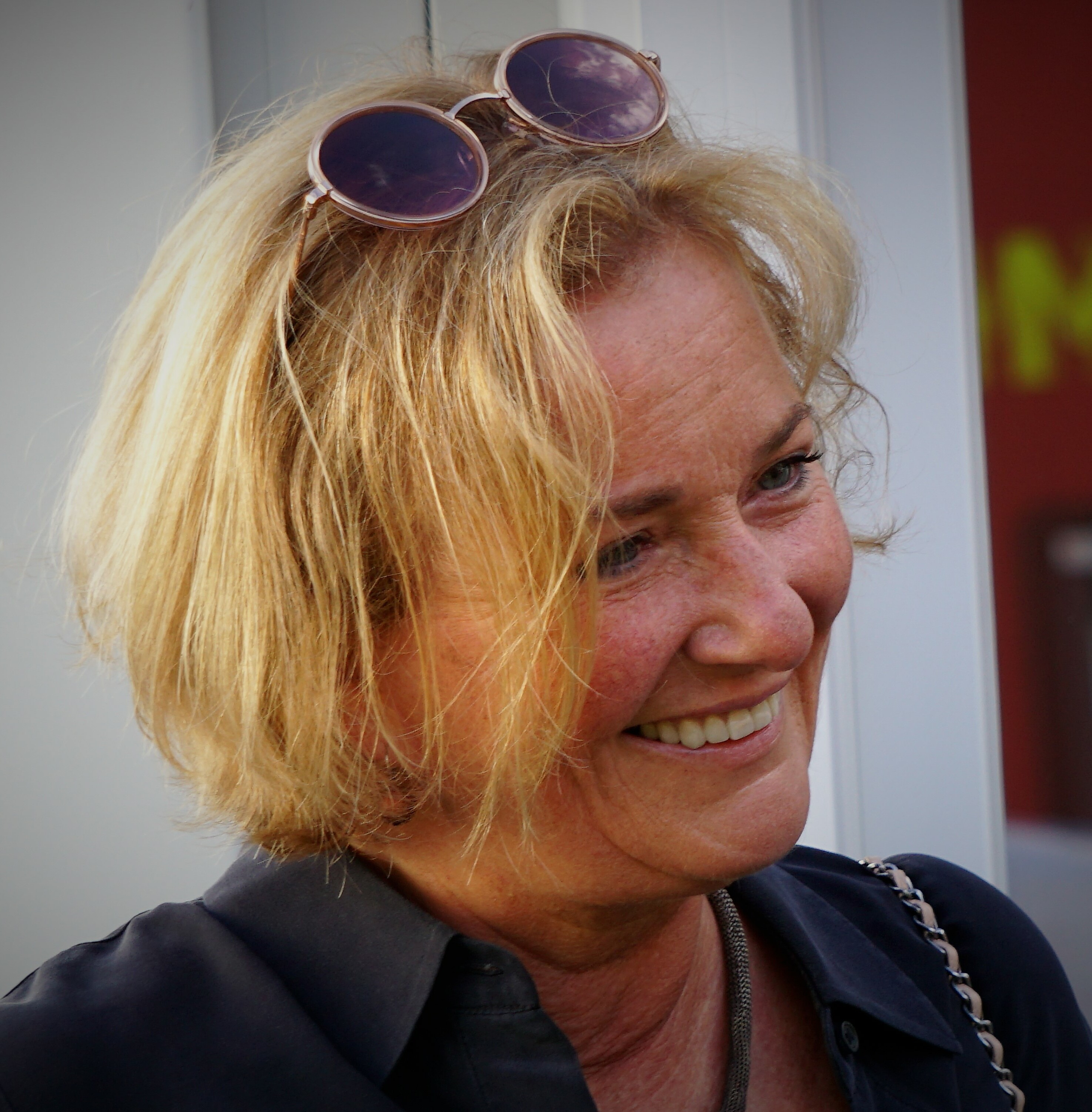
- Lenert in 2022.

Member of the Council of State
- Incumbent
- Assumed office 9 June 2026
- Preceded by: Yves Wagener

Member of the Chamber of Deputies
- In office 21 November 2023 – 9 June 2026
- Succeeded by: Ben Streff
- Constituency: East

Deputy Prime Minister of Luxembourg
- In office 5 January 2022 – 17 November 2023 Serving with François Bausch
- Prime Minister: Xavier Bettel
- Preceded by: Dan Kersch
- Succeeded by: Xavier Bettel

Minister of Health
- In office 4 February 2020 – 17 November 2023
- Prime Minister: Xavier Bettel
- Preceded by: Etienne Schneider

Minister of Consumer Protection
- In office 5 December 2018 – 17 November 2023
- Prime Minister: Xavier Bettel
- Preceded by: Fernand Etgen

Minister of Development Cooperation and Humanitarian Affairs
- In office 5 December 2018 – 4 February 2020
- Prime Minister: Xavier Bettel
- Preceded by: Romain Schneider
- Succeeded by: Franz Fayot

Personal details
- Born: 31 May 1968 (age 58) Luxembourg City, Luxembourg
- Party: Luxembourg Socialist Workers' Party
- Education: University Aix-Marseille III

Paulette Lenert (born 31 May 1968) is a Luxembourgish lawyer and politician of the Luxembourg Socialist Workers' Party. She held the positions of Deputy Prime Minister, Minister of Health, Minister Delegate of Social Security, and Minister of Consumer Protection. She was Minister of Development Cooperation and Humanitarian Affairs from 5 December 2018 to 4 February 2020.

== History ==
After completing classical studies at the Athénée de Luxembourg, Lenert graduated in private and commercial law from the University Aix-Marseille III in 1991. Then she obtained a master's degree in European law at the University of London in 1992.

She was admitted as a lawyer to the bar of Luxembourg in 1992. In 1994, she became a justice attaché to the Ministry of Justice. From 1997 to 2010, she was the first judge and the deputy chairwoman of the Administrative Court of Luxembourg. She was the first government counsellor to the Minister of Solidarity Economy between 2010 and 2013.

In 2013, she headed the newly established Facilitation Unit for Urban Planning and Environment. Following the 2013 cabinet reshuffles, she joined the Ministry of the Civil Service as a first government councillor. She became the general coordinator of the ministry in 2014. In addition, she was appointed as an executive to the National Institute for Public Administration. She resigned from these offices when she joined the government.

On 5 December 2018, after the general election, Lenert became the Minister of Development Cooperation and Humanitarian Affairs and Minister of Consumer Protection within the coalition ministry made by the Democratic Party, the Luxembourg Socialist Workers' Party and The Greens.

On 4 February 2020, following the resignation of Etienne Schneider, Lenert became Minister of Health. Franz Fayot took over the Ministry of Development Cooperation and Humanitarian Affairs on the same date.

She lives in Mondorf-les-Bains in southeastern Luxembourg.
