= Alex Donnersbach =

Luxembourgish politician (born 1992)

The Honourable Alex Donnersbach
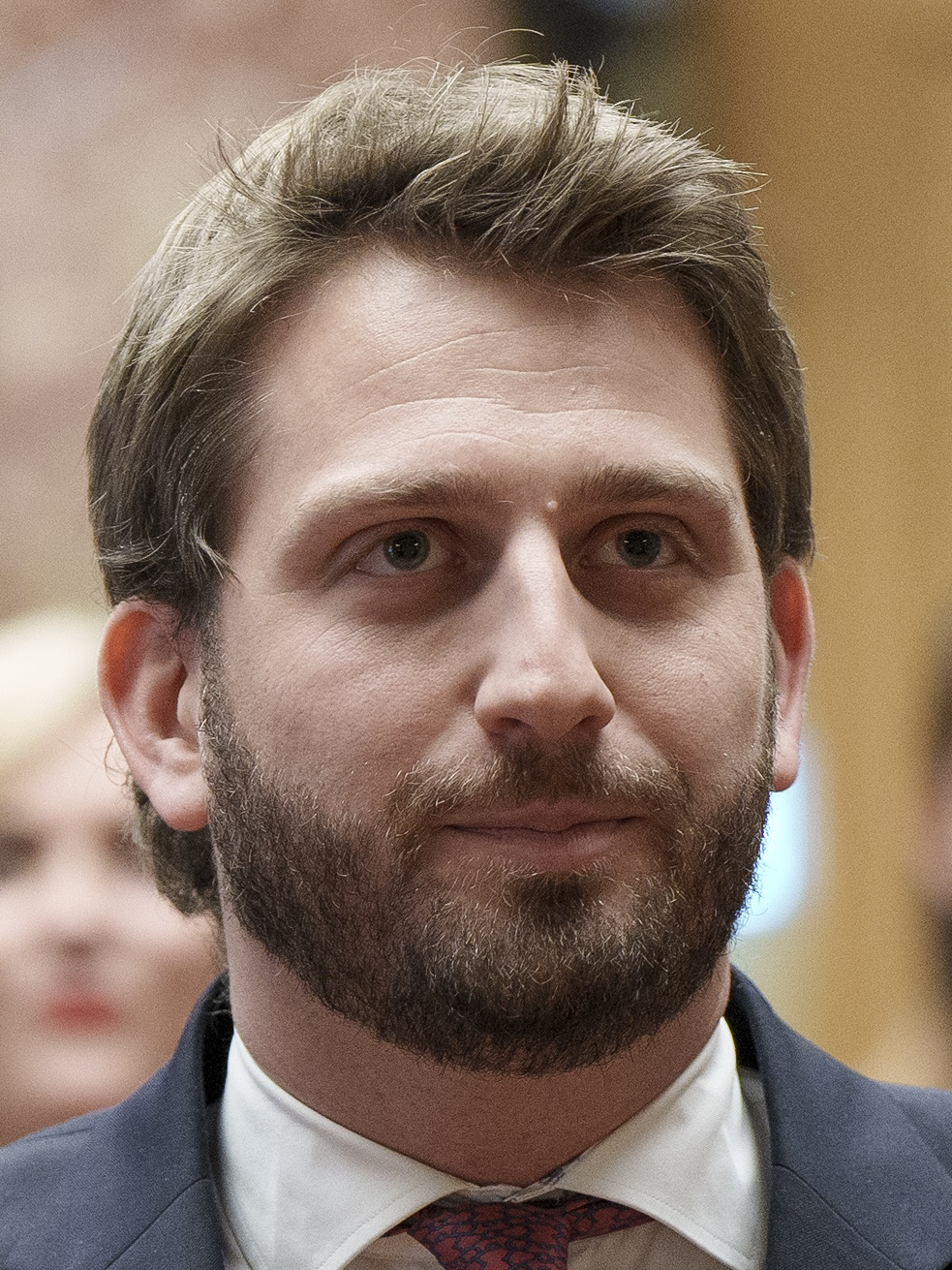

Member of the Chamber of Deputies
- Incumbent
- Assumed office 21 November 2023
- Constituency: Centre

Personal details
- Born: 9 January 1992 (age 34) Luxembourg City, Luxembourg
- Party: Christian Social People's Party

Alexandre Donnersbach (born 9 January 1992) is a Luxembourgish politician. He has served as a member of the Chamber of Deputies from Centre since 2023.
