= Marc Hansen (politician) =

Luxembourgish politician

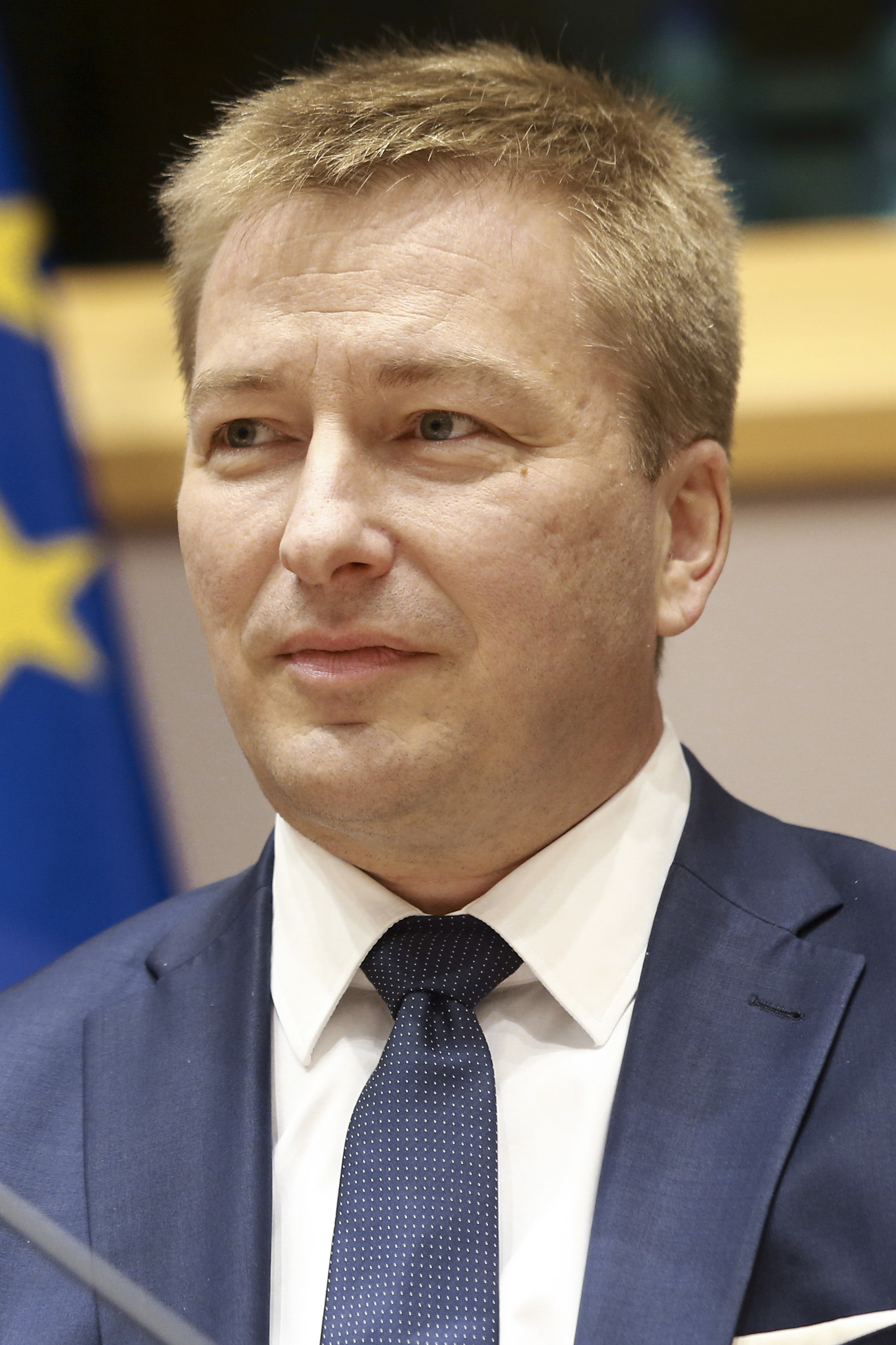
Hansen in 2015.

Marc Hansen (born 10 April 1971) is a Luxembourgish politician of the Democratic Party. He served as Minister for the Civil Service and Minister for Relations with Parliament in the second Bettel Government.
