= Alderman (Luxembourg) =

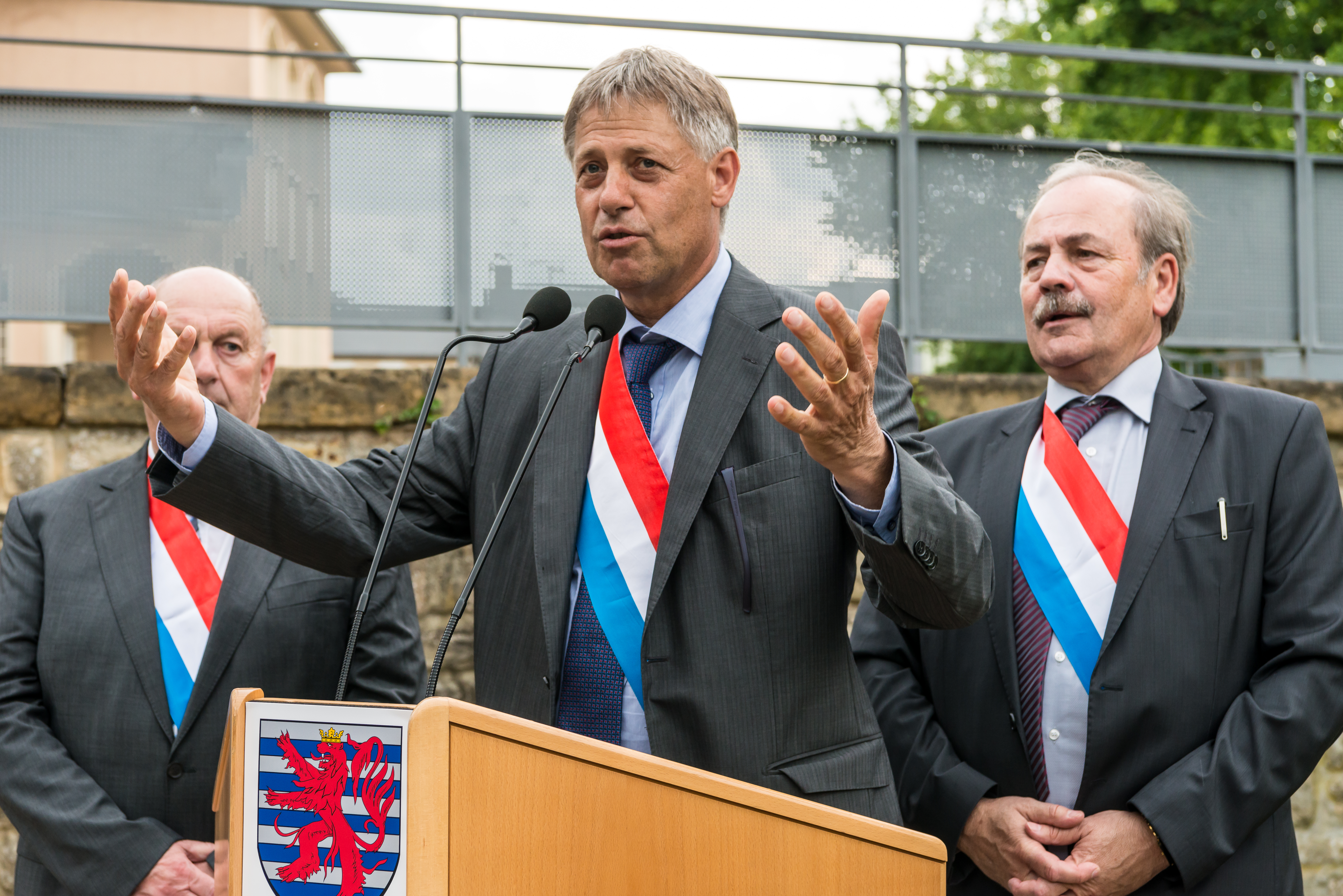
Then-mayor of Remich Henri Kox surrounded by the city's two aldermen.

An alderman (French: Échevin; (Note: The French term is sometimes used in English, and in rare instances anglicized as eschevin) Luxembourgish: Schäffe; German: Schöffe) is a member of the executive of a Luxembourgish commune. Together, they form the college of aldermen (Luxembourgish: Schäfferot), which helps the mayor run the administration. In most communes, aldermen have designated roles within the administration, adopting separate briefs as in a cabinet.

Aldermen are elected by the commune's council, and represent the make-up of the governing coalition. Formally, aldermen of cities are nominated by the Grand Duke, whilst those of other communes are named by the Minister for the Interior. Aldermen must be members of the communal council and hold Luxembourgish nationality.

Most communes have two aldermen, but more populous ones are allowed more if granted that right by Grand Ducal decree: communes with 10,000 to 19,999 inhabitants may have 3 aldermen, communes with 20,000 or more may have 4 aldermen, and Luxembourg City may have up to six.
