= Gilles Roth =

Luxembourgish politician (born 1967)

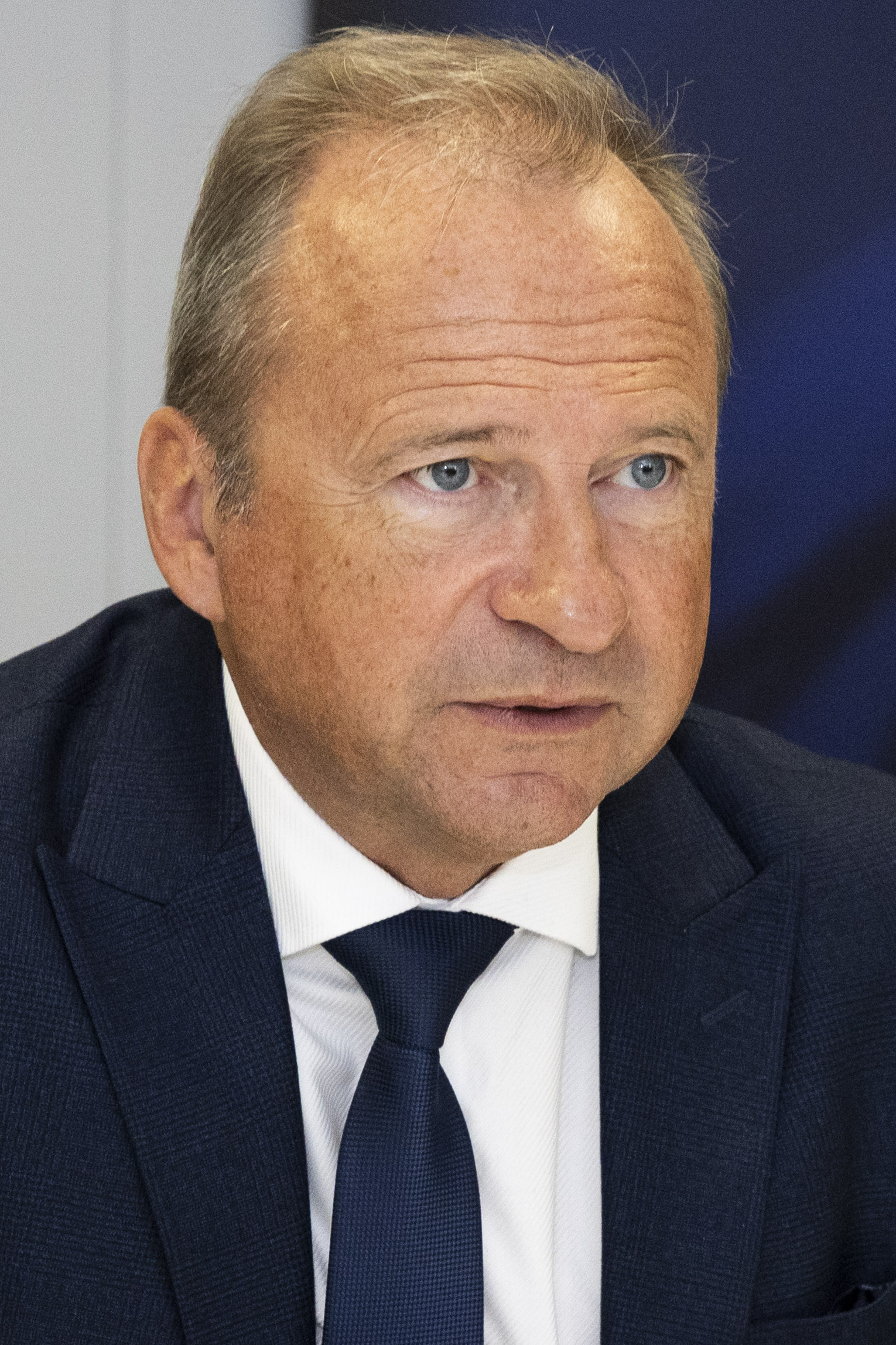
- Roth in 2025

Minister of Finance
- Incumbent
- Assumed office 17 November 2023
- Prime Minister: Luc Frieden
- Government: Frieden-Bettel
- Preceded by: Yuriko Backes

Member of the Chamber of Deputies
- In office 24 April 2007 – 17 November 2023
- Preceded by: François Maroldt
- Succeeded by: Nathalie Morgenthaler
- Constituency: South

Mayor of Mamer
- In office 1 January 2000 – 17 November 2023
- Monarchs: Jean; Henri
- Preceded by: Henri Hosch
- Succeeded by: Luc Feller

Personal details
- Born: 1 March 1967 (age 59)
- Party: Christian Social People's Party

Gilles Roth (born 1 March 1967) is a Luxembourgish politician of the Christian Social People's Party serving as minister of finance since 2023. From 2007 to 2023, he was a member of the Chamber of Deputies.
