= List of female members of the European Parliament for Luxembourg =

This is a list of women who are or have been members of the European Parliament for Luxembourg.

== List ==
Image	Name	National party	EP group	Elected	Year left	Ref.
	Colette Flesch	Democratic Party	LDR	1979	1980 (Note: Resigned and was replaced by René Mart.)	
	Colette Flesch	Democratic Party	LDR	1984	1985 (Note: Resigned and was replaced by Lydie Polfer.)	
	Colette Flesch	Democratic Party	LDR	1989	1990 (Note: Resigned and was replaced by Lydie Polfer.)	
	Colette Flesch	Democratic Party	LDR	1999	2004	
	Marcelle Lentz-Cornette	Christian Social People's Party	EPP	1980 (Note: Elected as replacement for Jean Spautz.)	1989	
	Lydie Schmit	Luxembourg Socialist Workers' Party	S&D	1984	1988 (Note: Died in office and was replaced by Jos Wohlfart.)	
	Lydie Polfer	Democratic Party	LDR	1985 (Note: Elected as replacement for Colette Flesch.)	1989	
	Lydie Polfer	Democratic Party	LDR	1990 (Note: Elected as replacement for Colette Flesch.)	1994	
	Lydie Polfer	Democratic Party	ALDE	2004	2009	
	Astrid Lulling	Christian Social People's Party	EPP	1989	1999	
	Astrid Lulling	Christian Social People's Party	EPP	1999 (Note: Elected as replacement for Viviane Reding.)	2014	
	Viviane Reding	Christian Social People's Party	EPP	1989	1999 (Note: Resigned to become the European Commissioner for Education and Culture in the Prodi Commission.)	
	Viviane Reding	Christian Social People's Party	EPP	2014	2018 (Note: Resigned and was replaced by Christophe Hansen.)	
	Erna Hennicot-Schoepges	Christian Social People's Party	EPP	2004 (Note: Elected as replacement for François Biltgen.)	2009	
	Mady Delvaux-Stehres	Luxembourg Socialist Workers' Party	S&D	2014	2019	
	Tilly Metz	The Greens	Greens/EFA	2018 (Note: Elected as replacement for Claude Turmes.)	Incumbent	
	Isabel Wiseler-Santos Lima	Christian Social People's Party	EPP	2019	Incumbent	
	Monica Semedo	Democratic Party	RE	2019	2024	
	Martine Kemp	Christian Social People's Party	EPP	2023 (Note: Elected as replacement for Christophe Hansen.)	Incumbent	

== See also ==
- Women in Luxembourg
- Luxembourg (European Parliament constituency)
