= List of members of the European Parliament for Luxembourg, 2014–2019 =

This is a list of members of the European Parliament for the Luxembourg in the 2014 to 2019 session.

See 2014 European Parliament election in Luxembourg for further information on these elections in Luxembourg.

== List ==
This table can be sorted by party or party group: click the symbol at the top of the appropriate column.

Name	National party	EP group
Georges Bach	Christian Social People's Party (CSV)	EPP
Mady Delvaux-Stehres	Luxembourg Socialist Workers' Party (LSAP)	S&D
Frank Engel	Christian Social People's Party (CSV)	EPP
Charles Goerens	Democratic Party (DP)	ALDE
Christophe Hansen (2018–2019)	Christian Social People's Party (CSV)	EPP
Tilly Metz (2018–2019)	The Greens	Greens/EFA
Viviane Reding (2014–2018)	Christian Social People's Party (CSV)	EPP
Claude Turmes (2014–2018)	The Greens	Greens/EFA
