= List of members of the European Parliament for Luxembourg, 2019–2024 =

This is a list of members of the European Parliament for the Luxembourg in the 2019 to 2024 session.

See 2019 European Parliament election in Luxembourg for further information on these elections in Luxembourg.

== List ==
This table can be sorted by party or party group: click the symbol at the top of the appropriate column.

Name	National party	EP group
Marc Angel (December 2019–)	Luxembourg Socialist Workers' Party (LSAP)	S&D
Charles Goerens	Democratic Party (DP)	ALDE
Christophe Hansen (July 2019–October 2023)	Christian Social People's Party (CSV)	EPP
Isabel Wiseler-Santos Lima	Christian Social People's Party (CSV)	EPP
Tilly Metz	The Greens	Greens/EFA
Nicolas Schmit (July 2019–November 2019)	Luxembourg Socialist Workers' Party (LSAP)	S&D
Monica Semedo	Democratic Party (DP)	ALDE
Martine Kemp (October 2023–)	Christian Social People's Party (CSV)	EPP
