= Elections to the European Parliament =

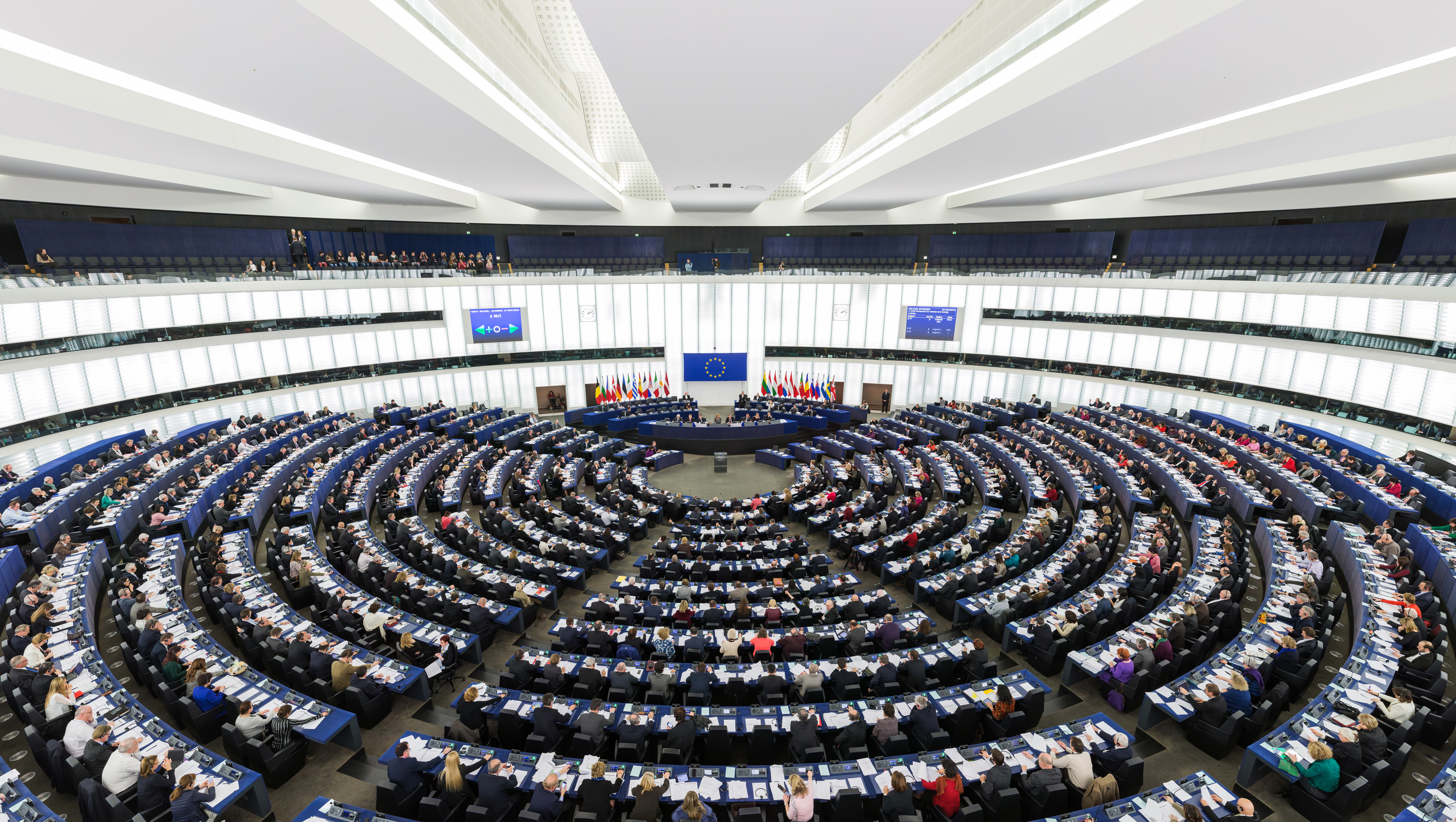
The hemicycle of the European Parliament in Strasbourg, France

Political groups of the European Parliament during the 10th legislature (2024–2029): The Left in the European Parliament – GUE/NGL (The Left) Progressive Alliance of Socialists and Democrats (S&D) Greens–European Free Alliance (Greens/EFA) Renew Europe (Renew) European People's Party Group (EPP) European Conservatives and Reformists (ECR) Patriots for Europe (PfE) Europe of Sovereign Nations Group (ESN) Non-Inscrits (NI)

Elections to the European Parliament take place every five years by universal adult suffrage; with more than 400 million people eligible to vote, they are the second largest democratic elections in the world after India's.

Until 2019, 751 MEPs were elected to the European Parliament, which has been directly elected since 1979. Since the withdrawal of the United Kingdom from the EU in 2020, the number of MEPs, including the president, has been 705. No other EU institution is directly elected, with the Council of the European Union and the European Council being only indirectly legitimated through national elections. While European political parties have the right to campaign EU-wide for the European elections, campaigns still take place through national election campaigns, advertising national delegates from national parties.

The election days are 4 consecutive days, from Thursday to Sunday, between April 7th and July 10th. The latest election took place in 2024 and the next election will take place in 2029.

== Apportionment ==
The allocation of seats to each member state is based on the principle of degressive proportionality, so that, while the size of the population of each country is taken into account, smaller states elect more MEPs than is proportional to their populations. As the numbers of MEPs to be elected by each country have arisen from treaty negotiations, there is no precise formula for the apportionment of seats among member states. No change in this configuration can occur without the unanimous consent of all governments.

European Parliament apportionment changes between the Treaty of Nice and the Treaty of Lisbon (as calculated for purposes of the 2009 European elections)
| Member state | 2007 Nice | 2009 Nice | 2014 Lisbon | 2014 (Note: As proposed by European Parliament on 13 March 2013.) + Croatia |
|---|---|---|---|---|
| Germany | 99 | 99 | 96 | 96 |
| France | 78 | 72 | 74 | 74 |
| United Kingdom (Note: Included Gibraltar, but not any other BOT (including the SBAs), nor the Crown Dependencies. The United Kingdom and Gibraltar left the European Union on 31 January 2020.) | 78 | 72 | 73 | 73 |
| Italy | 78 | 72 | 73 | 73 |
| Spain | 54 | 50 | 54 | 54 |
| Poland | 54 | 50 | 51 | 51 |
| Romania | 35 | 33 | 33 | 32 |
| Netherlands | 27 | 25 | 26 | 26 |
| Belgium | 24 | 22 | 22 | 21 |
| Czech Republic | 24 | 22 | 22 | 21 |
| Greece | 24 | 22 | 22 | 21 |
| Hungary | 24 | 22 | 22 | 21 |
| Portugal | 24 | 22 | 22 | 21 |
| Sweden | 19 | 18 | 20 | 20 |
| Austria | 18 | 17 | 19 | 18 |
| Bulgaria | 18 | 17 | 18 | 17 |
| Finland | 14 | 13 | 13 | 13 |
| Denmark | 14 | 13 | 13 | 13 |
| Slovakia | 14 | 13 | 13 | 13 |
| Croatia | – | – | – | 11 |
| Ireland | 13 | 12 | 12 | 11 |
| Lithuania | 13 | 12 | 12 | 11 |
| Latvia | 9 | 8 | 9 | 8 |
| Slovenia | 7 | 7 | 8 | 8 |
| Cyprus | 6 | 6 | 6 | 6 |
| Estonia | 6 | 6 | 6 | 6 |
| Luxembourg | 6 | 6 | 6 | 6 |
| Malta | 5 | 5 | 6 | 6 |
| Total: | 785 | 736 | 751 (Note: The speaker is not counted officially, thus leaving 750 MEPs.) | 751 |
Italicised countries are divided into sub-national constituencies, except France which changed to full-country voting in 2019.

== Voting system ==
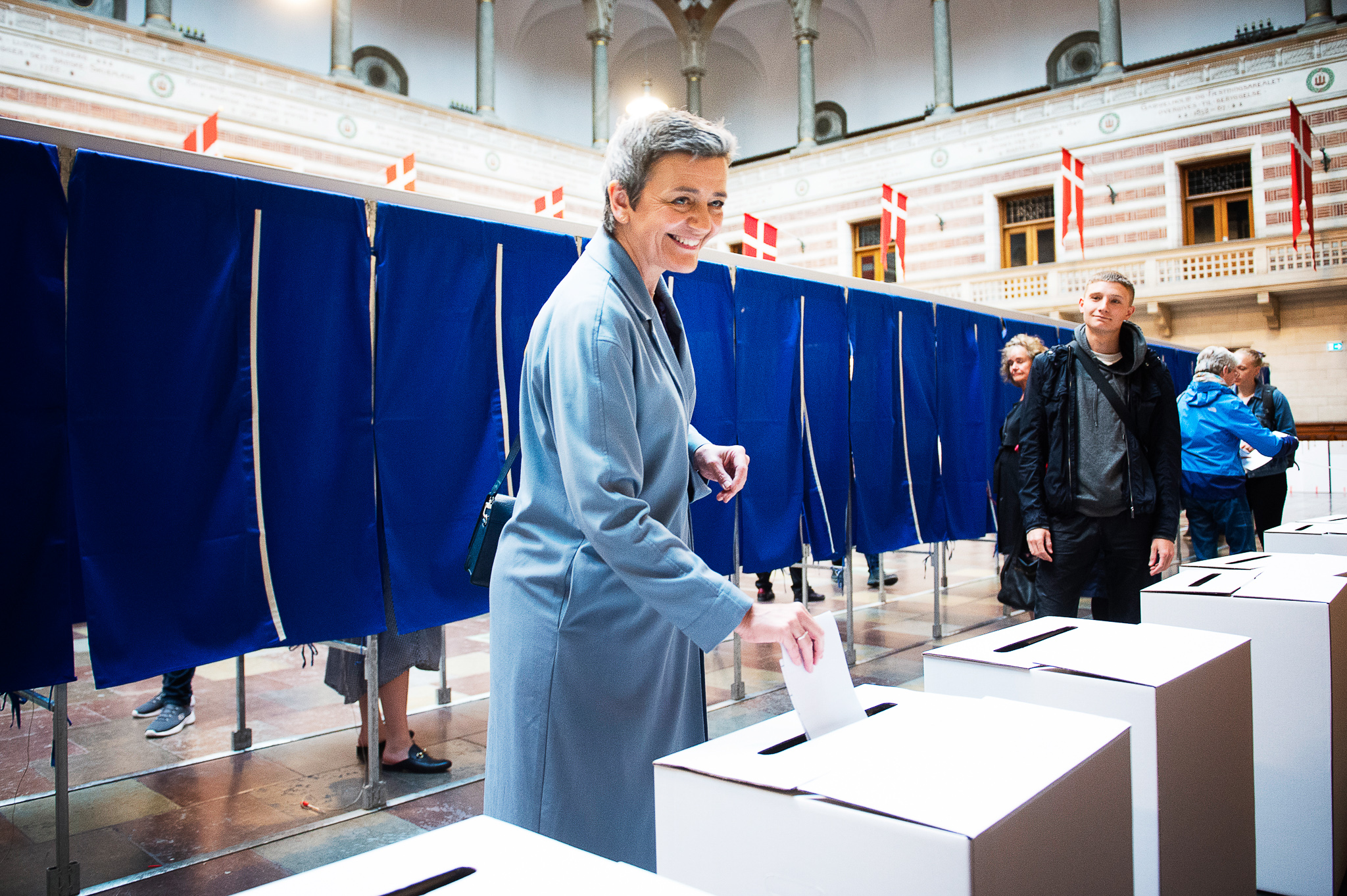
Margrethe Vestager votes in Denmark during the 2019 elections

There is no uniform voting system for the election of MEPs; rather, each member state is free to choose its own system, subject to certain restrictions:

- The system must be a form of proportional representation, under either the party list or the single transferable vote system.
- The electoral area may be subdivided if this will not generally affect the proportional nature of the electoral system.
- The electoral threshold, if there is any, may not exceed 5%. From the 2024 election there might be a minimum threshold of between 2% and 5% for constituencies with more than 35 seats, if the Council Decision (EU, Euratom) 2018/994 of 13 July 2018 is approved by all EU states in accordance with their respective constitutional requirements.

=== Voting difference by country ===
Most of the member states of the European Union elect their MEPs with a single constituency covering the entire state, using party-list proportional representation. There is however a great variety of electoral procedures: some countries use a highest averages method of proportional representation, some use the largest remainder method, some open lists and others closed. In addition, the method of calculating the quota and the election threshold vary from country to country. Countries with multiple constituencies are:

- Belgium is split into three constituencies: the Dutch-speaking electoral college, the French-speaking electoral college, and the German-speaking electoral college. The first two of these elect their MEPs using party list PR, but the German-speaking constituency only has one member, who is therefore not elected using a proportional method.
- Ireland is split into three constituencies and uses the single transferable vote.
- The United Kingdom, historically up until its exit from the Union, was split into constituencies representing Scotland, Wales, Northern Ireland and each of the regions of England. Northern Ireland used the single transferable vote while the other constituencies used party lists. Before 1999, England, Scotland and Wales used first-past-the-post.

Germany, Italy and Poland use a different system, whereby parties are awarded seats based on their nationwide vote as in all of the states that elect members from a single constituency; these seats are given to the candidates on regional lists. With the number of seats for each party known, these are given to the candidates on the regional lists based on the number of votes from each region towards the party's nationwide total, awarded proportionally to the regions. These subdivisions are not strictly constituencies, as they do not affect how many seats each party is awarded, but are districts that the members represent once elected. The number of members for each region is decided dynamically after the election, and depends on voter turnout in each region. A region with high turnout will result in more votes for the parties there, which will result in a greater number of MEPs elected for that region.

== European political parties ==
The European Union has a multi-party system involving a number of ideologically diverse European political parties. As no single European party has ever gained power alone, their affiliated parliamentary groups in the European Parliament work together to pass legislation. Since no pan-European government is formed as a result of European elections, long-term coalitions do not exist.

European parties have the exclusive right to campaign for the European elections; their parliamentary groups are strictly forbidden to campaign and to spend funds on any campaign-related activity. Campaign activities differ per member state since national elections for European Parliament representatives are governed by national law. For instance, a European party may buy unlimited advertising airtime in Estonia, while it is barred from any form of paid advertising in Sweden.

Ahead of the 2014 European elections, European political parties decided to put forward candidates for President of the European Commission, also known as "Spitzenkandidaten" or "lead candidates". Each lead candidate led the pan-European campaign of its European party. Even though there is no legal obligation on the European Council to propose the lead candidate of the strongest party to the European Parliament as its nominee for President of the Commission, it was assumed that the Council would accept voters' decision. Indeed, following the victory of the European People's Party (EPP) in the 2014 European elections, its lead candidate Jean-Claude Juncker was nominated by the Council and later approved by the European Parliament. However, following the 2019 European elections, the Council nominated Ursula von der Leyen instead of the EPP's lead candidate, Manfred Weber; the European Parliament later approved this nomination.

The two largest European political parties are the centre-right European People's Party and the centre-left Party of European Socialists (PES). They also form the two largest parliamentary groups, the EPP Group and S&D, along with national parties not members of the European parties but represented in the European Parliament.

There are numerous other European parties and groups, spanning the entire political spectrum. Sometimes, two or more European parties sit in the same group, such as members of the European Green Party and of the European Free Alliance sitting together in the Greens–European Free Alliance group. Members of the European Parliament who are not members of a parliamentary group are known as non-inscrits.

| Political group | European political parties | MEPs |
|---|---|---|
| European People's Party Group (EPP Group) | European People's Party (EPP); European Christian Political Party (ECPP) | 185 / 720 (26%) |
| Progressive Alliance of Socialists and Democrats (S&D) | Party of European Socialists (PES) | 135 / 720 (19%) |
| Patriots for Europe (PfE) | Patriots.eu | 85 / 720 (12%) |
| European Conservatives and Reformists Group (ECR Group) | European Conservatives and Reformists Party (ECR); European Free Alliance (EFA); European Christian Political Party (ECPP) | 84 / 720 (12%) |
| Renew Europe (Renew) | Alliance of Liberals and Democrats for Europe Party (ALDE Party); European Democratic Party (EDP) | 78 / 720 (11%) |
| Greens/European Free Alliance (Greens/EFA) | European Green Party (EGP); European Free Alliance (EFA) | 53 / 720 (7%) |
| The Left in the European Parliament (The Left) | European Left Alliance for the People and the Planet (ELA); Party of the European Left (PEL) | 45 / 720 (6%) |
| Europe of Sovereign Nations Group (ESN) | Europe of Sovereign Nations (ESN) | 27 / 720 (4%) |
| Non-attached members (Non-Inscrits) | | 28 / 720 (4%) |
| Vacant | | 1 / 720 |

== Voter behaviour ==
A 1980 analysis by Karlheinz Reif and Hermann Schmitt concluded that European elections were fought on national issues and used by voters to punish their governments mid-term, making European Parliament elections de facto national elections of second rank. This phenomenon is also referred to by some experts as the "punishment traps", wherein voters use the European Parliament elections and other European integration referendums as punishment for governments on account of bad economic performance. There is also a study that showed how voters tend to choose candidates of a party at the European level if it has a history of advancing specific issues that they care about. This is related to the second theory that explains voter behaviour and it involves the so-called attitude voting in which voters are assumed to be acting on the basis of their attitude towards the European integration. This is analogous to the American two-party system in the sense that voting on issues and legislation in the Parliament only requires a yes or no vote, which means voters vote for options or candidates that are close to their ideals.

Turnout had constantly fallen in every EU election from 1979 until 2014. The 2019 election, however, saw turnout increase to its highest level since 1994, at 51%. In 2009, the overall turnout was at 43%, down from 45.5% in 2004. In Britain the turnout was just 34.3%, down from 38% in 2004. Despite falling below 50% between 1999 and 2014, turnout was not as low as that of the US Midterm elections, which usually falls below 40%. However, the comparison with the US voter turnout is hampered due to the fact that the US president is elected in separate and direct elections (presidential system), whereas the President of the European Commission is elected by the European Parliament (parliamentary system), giving the European Parliament elections considerable weight. Some, such as former President of the European Parliament, Pat Cox, have also noted that turnout in the 1999 election was higher than the previous US presidential election. German MEP Jo Leinen has suggested that EU parties name their top candidate for the position of President of the European Commission in order to increase turnout. This happened for the 2014 election, with EPP candidate Jean Claude Juncker ultimately selected, after the EPP won the most seats overall.

As of 2024, Bulgaria's GERB, Croatia's HDZ, Cyprus's DISY, Germany's CDU/CSU, Hungary's Fidesz, Malta's Labour Party and Sweden's Swedish Social Democratic Party have won every EU election.

== Results ==
List of elections (excluding by-elections)
- 2019 – EU 28
- 2014 – EU 28
- 2013 – Croatia
- 2009 – EU 27
- 2007 – Bulgaria and Romania
- 2004 – EU 25
- 1999 – EU 15
- 1996 – Austria and Finland
- 1995 – Sweden
- 1994 – EU 12
- 1989 – EC 12
- 1987 – Portugal and Spain
- 1984 – EC 10
- 1981 – Greece
- 1979 – EC 9
List of European Parliament elections by state

Historical percentage (of seats) results in union-wide elections of the three major groups by region:

| Region | 1979 | 1984 | 1989 | 1994 | 1999 | 2004 | 2009 | 2014 | 2019 |
|---|---|---|---|---|---|---|---|---|---|
| Northern | 3.6 | 6.3 | 6.3 | 22.0 | 35.3 | 31.2 | 10.9 | 9.2 | |
| Northern | 3.6 | 2.7 | 4.5 | 6.8 | 16.7 | 18.1 | 20.3 | 9.2 | |
| Northern | 23.2 | 33.0 | 45.5 | 56.8 | 27.6 | 23.9 | 21.0 | 24.6 | |
| Western | 33.6 | 30.9 | 26.7 | 31.9 | 36.4 | 34.9 | 37.3 | 29.5 | |
| Western | 6.5 | 10.6 | 12.0 | 8.5 | 5.2 | 11.9 | 12.5 | 10.8 | |
| Western | 34.1 | 32.7 | 32.7 | 29.9 | 27.9 | 30.2 | 20.8 | 22.0 | |
| Southern | 37.0 | 34.3 | 29.6 | 25.9 | 39.8 | 38.2 | 45.2 | 28.2 | |
| Southern | 6.2 | 4.8 | 9.5 | 8.5 | 5.0 | 7.9 | 5.0 | 5.5 | |
| Southern | 16.0 | 21.0 | 29.1 | 29.9 | 30.8 | 33.0 | 35.0 | 34.3 | |
| Central and South-Eastern | - | - | - | - | - | 46.4 | 41.0 | 43.7 | |
| Central and South-Eastern | - | - | - | - | - | 14.3 | 10.0 | 9.5 | |
| Central and South-Eastern | - | - | - | - | - | 21.4 | 23.7 | 22.6 | |
| Total | 26.0 | 25.3 | 23.4 | 27.7 | 37.2 | 36.9 | 36.0 | 29.4 | |
| Total | 9.8 | 7.1 | 9.5 | 7.6 | 8.0 | 12.4 | 11.4 | 8.9 | |
| Total | 27.6 | 30.0 | 34.2 | 34.9 | 28.8 | 28.3 | 25.0 | 25.4 | |
| Turnout of registered voters | 61.99 | 58.98 | 58.41 | 56.67 | 49.51 | 45.47 | 42.97 | 42.61 | 50.66 |

Legend: Socialist (PES/S&D) – Liberal (ELDR/ALDE) – People's (EPP/EPP-ED)

Percentage turnout of registered voters View source data.

=== Results by member state ===
| Election | 1979 | 1984 | 1989 | 1994 | 1999 | 2004 | 2009 | 2014 | 2019 | 2024 |
|---|---|---|---|---|---|---|---|---|---|---|
| Belgium | Results | Results | Results | Results | Results | Results | Results | Results | Results | Results |
| Denmark | Results | Results | Results | Results | Results | Results | Results | Results | Results | Results |
| France | Results | Results | Results | Results | Results | Results | Results | Results | Results | Results |
| Germany | Results | Results | Results | Results | Results | Results | Results | Results | Results | Results |
| Ireland | Results | Results | Results | Results | Results | Results | Results | Results | Results | Results |
| Italy | Results | Results | Results | Results | Results | Results | Results | Results | Results | Results |
| Luxembourg | Results | Results | Results | Results | Results | Results | Results | Results | Results | Results |
| Netherlands | Results | Results | Results | Results | Results | Results | Results | Results | Results | Results |
| United Kingdom | Results | Results | Results | Results | Results | Results | Results | Results | Results | - |
| Greece | - | Results | Results | Results | Results | Results | Results | Results | Results | Results |
| Portugal | - | - | Results | Results | Results | Results | Results | Results | Results | Results |
| Spain | - | - | Results | Results | Results | Results | Results | Results | Results | Results |
| Austria | - | - | - | - | Results | Results | Results | Results | Results | Results |
| Finland | - | - | - | - | Results | Results | Results | Results | Results | Results |
| Sweden | - | - | - | - | Results | Results | Results | Results | Results | Results |
| Cyprus | - | - | - | - | - | Results | Results | Results | Results | Results |
| Czech Republic | - | - | - | - | - | Results | Results | Results | Results | Results |
| Estonia | - | - | - | - | - | Results | Results | Results | Results | Results |
| Hungary | - | - | - | - | - | Results | Results | Results | Results | Results |
| Latvia | - | - | - | - | - | Results | Results | Results | Results | Results |
| Lithuania | - | - | - | - | - | Results | Results | Results | Results | Results |
| Malta | - | - | - | - | - | Results | Results | Results | Results | Results |
| Poland | - | - | - | - | - | Results | Results | Results | Results | Results |
| Slovakia | - | - | - | - | - | Results | Results | Results | Results | Results |
| Slovenia | - | - | - | - | - | Results | Results | Results | Results | Results |
| Bulgaria | - | - | - | - | - | - | Results | Results | Results | Results |
| Romania | - | - | - | - | - | - | Results | Results | Results | Results |
| Croatia | - | - | - | - | - | - | - | Results | Results | Results |

==== Off-year ====
1981: Greece

1987: Spain, Portugal

1995: Sweden

1996: Austria, Finland

2007: Bulgaria, Romania

2013: Croatia

==== By-elections in the United Kingdom ====
1979: London South West

1987: Midlands West

1988: Hampshire Central

1996: Merseyside West

1998: Yorkshire South, North East Scotland

== Proposed reforms ==
The final report of the Conference on the Future of Europe includes more than 320 proposed measures to reform the European Union. It proposes amending EU electoral law to harmonise electoral conditions (voting age, election date, requirements for electoral districts, candidates, political parties and their financing) for the European Parliament elections, as well as moving towards voting for Union-wide lists, or 'transnational lists', with candidates from multiple member states. It also recommends facilitating digital voting possibilities and guaranteeing effective voting rights for persons with disabilities. The report states that European citizens should have a greater say on who is elected President of the European Commission, suggesting this could be achieved either by the direct election of the Commission President or by a lead candidate system.

== Role in the appointment of Commission President ==
| Election | Largest Group | President | Party | Spitzenkandidat process adhered to? | Notes on Spitzenkandidat |
|---|---|---|---|---|---|
| 1994 | PES | Jacques Santer | EPP | N/A | Process not yet introduced. |
| 1999 | EPP-ED | Romano Prodi | ELDR | N/A | Process not yet introduced. |
| 2004 | EPP-ED | José Manuel Barroso | EPP | N/A | Process not yet introduced. |
| 2009 | EPP | José Manuel Barroso | EPP | N/A | Process not yet introduced. |
| 2014 | EPP | Jean-Claude Juncker | EPP | Yes | Jean-Claude Juncker (EPP) was nominated and elected Commission President. |
| 2019 | EPP | Ursula von der Leyen | EPP | No | Ursula von der Leyen (EPP) was elected despite Manfred Weber being nominated as the EPP Spitzenkandidat. |
| 2024 | EPP | Ursula von der Leyen | EPP | Yes | Incumbent Ursula von der Leyen (EPP) was the Spitzenkandidat and re-elected Commission President. |

The third Delors Commission had a short mandate, to bring the terms of the Commission in line with that of the Parliament. Under the European Constitution the European Council would have to take into account the results of the latest European elections and, furthermore, the Parliament would ceremonially "elect", rather than simply approve, the council's proposed candidate. This was taken as the parliament's cue to have its parties run with candidates for the President of the European Commission with the candidate of the winning party being proposed by the council.

This was partly put into practice in 2004 when the European Council selected a candidate from the political party that won that year's election. However at that time only one party had run with a specific candidate: the European Green Party, who had the first true pan-European campaign, put forward Daniel Cohn-Bendit. However the fractious nature of the other political parties led to no other candidates, the People's Party only mentioned four or five people they'd like to be president. The Constitution failed ratification but these amendments have been carried over to the Treaty of Lisbon, which came into force in 2009.

There are plans to strengthen the European political parties in order for them to propose candidates for the 2009 election. The European Liberal Democrat and Reform Party have already indicated, in their October 2007 congress, their intention for forward a candidate for the post as part of a common campaign. They failed to do so however the European People's Party did select Barroso as their candidate and, as the largest party, Barroso's term was renewed. The Socialists, disappointed at the 2009 election, agreed to put forward a candidate for Commission President at all subsequent elections. There is a campaign within that party to have open primaries for said candidate.

In February 2008, President Barroso admitted there was a problem in legitimacy and that, despite having the same legitimacy as Prime Ministers in theory, in practice it was not the case. The low turnout creates a problem for the President's legitimacy, with the lack of a "European political sphere", but analysis claim that if citizens were voting for a list of candidates for the post of president, turn out would be much higher than that seen in recent years.

The President of the European Parliament Jerzy Buzek proposed in 2010 that Commissioners be directly elected, by member states placing their candidate at the top of their voting lists in European elections. That would give them individually, and the body as a whole, a democratic mandate.

== Eligibility ==
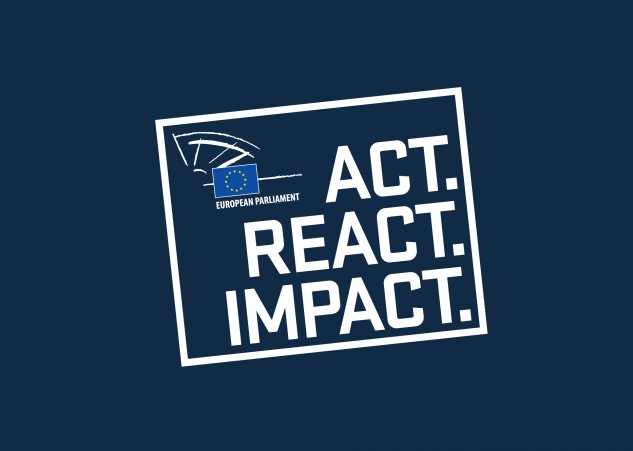
Logo and slogan of the European Parliament election 2014: Act. React. Impact.

Each Member State has different rules determining who can vote for and run as the European Parliamentary candidates. In Spain v United Kingdom, the European Court of Justice held that member states are permitted to extend the franchise to non-EU citizens.

Every EU citizen residing in an EU country of which they are not a national has the right to vote and to stand as a candidate in European Parliamentary elections in their country of residence, under the same conditions as nationals of that country – this right is enshrined in Article 39 of the Charter of Fundamental Rights of the European Union. In addition, the right to vote is included in Articles 20(1) and 22(1) of the Treaty on the Functioning of the European Union. To this extent all EU countries keep electoral registers containing the names of all eligible voters in the specific region, to which eligible newcomers to the area can apply at any time to have their names added. EU citizens are then eligible to vote for the duration of their stay in that country.

It is therefore possible for a person to have the choice of voting in more than one EU member state. For example, a Portuguese citizen who studies at university in France and lives at home outside term-time in the family home in the Netherlands has the option of voting in the European Parliamentary election in France, Portugal or the Netherlands. In this scenario, although the Portuguese citizen qualifies to vote in three EU member states, they are only permitted to cast one vote in one of the member states.

Minimum age to vote in European elections by country 18 17 16* *Belgium and Germany lowered the voting age to 16 for the next European elections.

| Member state | Eligible voters | Eligible candidates |
|---|---|---|
| Austria | Austrian citizens who are aged 16 or over on polling day and resident in Austria.; Austrian citizens who are aged 16 or over on polling day, resident abroad, and have submitted a notification to be listed in the electoral register of the Austrian commune they were a resident of.; European Union citizens aged 16 or over, resident in Austria, and have submitted a notification to be listed in the electoral register of the Austrian commune they are a resident of. | Same as on the left; the passive voting age is 18 instead of 16. |
| Belgium | Belgian citizens aged 18 or over on polling day resident in Belgium and entered in the population register of a Belgian commune.; Belgian citizens aged 18 or over on polling day resident outside Belgium, who have sent an application to vote to the Belgian diplomatic or consular post in their country of residence up to 16 days before polling day.; European Union citizens resident in Belgium, aged 18 or over on polling day, entered in the population register or in the foreigners' register of their commune of residence and enrolled in the electoral register.; Voting is compulsory and failing to vote can lead to a fine of up to €137.50. | European Union citizens aged 21 or over on polling day who speak French, Dutch or German. |
| Bulgaria | Bulgarian citizens who have attained the age of 18 years by polling day, have resided in the Republic of Bulgaria or in another Member State of the European Union at least 60 days during the last three months, are not interdicted and do not serve a custodial sentence; Each national of a Member State of the European Union, who is not a Bulgarian citizen, shall have the right to elect Members of the European Parliament for the Republic of Bulgaria if the said person has attained the age of 18 years by polling day, is not interdicted, does not serve a custodial sentence, has a certificate for residence status in the Republic of Bulgaria, has resided in the Republic of Bulgaria or in another Member State of the European Union at least 60 days during the last three months, is not deprived of the right to elect in the Member State of which the person is a national, and has stated in advance, by a declaration in writing, the desire thereof to exercise his or her right to vote within the territory of the Republic of Bulgaria. | Bulgarian citizen who has attained the age of 21 years by polling day, does not hold the citizenship of any State that is not a Member State of the European Union, is not interdicted, does not serve a custodial sentence, has a permanent address in the Republic of Bulgaria, and has resided in the Republic of Bulgaria or in another Member State of the European Union at least during the last six months.; Any national of a Member State of the European Union, who is not a Bulgarian citizen, has attained the age of 21 years by polling day, does not hold the citizenship of any State that is not a Member State of the European Union, is not interdicted, does not serve a custodial sentence, is not deprived of the right to be elected in the Member State of which the person is a national, enjoys a durable or permanent residence status for the Republic of Bulgaria, has resided in the Republic of Bulgaria or in another Member State of the European Union at least during the last six months, and has stated, by a declaration in writing, the desire thereof to be elected. |
| Croatia | Croatian citizens aged 18 or over; European Union citizens resident in Croatia enrolled in the electoral register at least 30 days before the election. | European Union citizens resident in Croatia enrolled in the electoral register at least 30 days before the election. |
| Cyprus | | |
| Czech Republic | European Union citizens aged 18 or over on polling day who are registered in the register of citizens for at least 45 days before polling day, unless a statutory limitation is imposed for reasons of protection of health or withdrawal or legal capacity. | European Union citizens |
| Denmark | Danish citizens aged 18 or over on polling day who are resident in Denmark or another EU member state, unless deprived of legal capacity.; European Union citizens aged 18 or over on polling day and resident in Denmark, unless deprived of legal capacity. | European Union citizens eligible to vote, unless they have been convicted of an action that in the public opinion makes them unworthy of being a member of the European Parliament. |
| Estonia | European Union citizens aged 18 or over on polling day and whose address is entered in the population register. A person who has been divested of their active legal capacity with regard to the right to vote and a person who has been convicted of a crime and is serving sentence in a penal institution, cannot vote. | European Union citizens at least 21 years of age and satisfying the requirements of the right to cast a vote, except members of the Defence Forces. |
| Finland | Every Finnish citizen aged 18 or over on polling day, regardless of domicile.; European Union citizens aged 18 or over on polling day and who are enrolled on the voting register in Finland and whose municipality of residence, as defined by law, is in Finland on the 51st day before election day, unless they have lost the right to vote in the Member State whose citizen they are. | Finnish citizens entitled to vote and not legally incompetent.; European Union citizens who are entitled to vote, registered with and entered into the voting register in Finland and not lost the right to stand as a candidate in elections in their home state. |
| France | French citizens aged 18 or over on polling day resident in France and enrolled in the electoral register.; French citizens aged 18 or over on polling day resident outside France and entered either in the consular register of electors (la liste électorale consulaire) or in the register of a municipality with which they are related (place of birth, last residence in France, municipality of one of forebears, spouse or relatives, municipality where they own a residence or pay local taxes) .; European Union citizens resident in France, aged 18 or over on polling day and enrolled in the electoral register. | European Union citizens aged 23 or over. |
| Germany | European Union citizens aged 18 or over on polling day resident in Germany, if they are resident in member states of the European Union for at least three months.; Additionally, German citizens aged 18 or over who have lived in Germany for at least three consecutive months within the last 25 years when they were at least aged 14. | European Union citizens aged 18 or over. |
| Greece | Greek citizens aged 17 or over on the last day of the year the election happens who are resident in Greece and registered in the electoral roll in a Greek municipality or community, unless deprived of legal capacity.; Greek citizens aged 17 or over on the last day of the year the election happens who are resident in another EU member state, registered in the electoral roll in a Greek municipality or community and have submitted an application to vote overseas to the Greek embassy or consulate in their country of residence on or before 31 March 2014, unless deprived of legal capacity.; European Union citizens aged 17 or over on the last day of the year the election happens, resident in Greece and registered in the electoral roll on or before 3 March 2014.; Voting is compulsory but not enforced. | European Union citizens aged 25 or over, unless deprived of legal capacity. |
| Hungary | Hungarian citizens aged 18 or over on polling day and whose municipality of residence is in Hungary. (automatically listed in the electoral register); European Union citizens aged 18 or over on polling day and whose municipality of residence is in Hungary and have submitted a notification to be listed in the electoral register. | Any European Union citizens who are entitled to vote (whose municipality of residence is in Hungary). |
| Ireland | European Union citizens who are ordinarily resident in Ireland on 1 September in the year before the Register of Electors comes into force.; Irish citizens who are officials on duty abroad (and their spouses) who are registered on the postal voters list. | European Union citizens over the age of 21, not otherwise disqualified from election to the Dáil. |
| Italy | Italian and European Union citizens aged 18 or over on polling day who are resident in Italy and enrolled in the electoral list of their town of residence up to 19 days before polling day.; Italian citizens aged 18 or over on polling day who are resident in other EU member states and have submitted an application to the Italian consulate up to 18 days before polling day.; Italian citizens aged 18 or over on polling day who are resident outside the European Union for the purpose of work, study or living with family and have submitted an application to the Italian consulate up to 18 days before polling day. | European Union citizens aged 25 or over on polling day and not deprived of the right to stand in their home country. |
| Latvia | | |
| Lithuania | | |
| Luxembourg | Luxembourgish citizens aged 18 or over on polling day resident in Luxembourg or overseas and enrolled in the electoral list up to 87 days before polling day.; European Union citizens resident in Luxembourg for at least 2 years, aged 18 or over on polling day and enrolled in the electoral list up to 87 days before polling day.; Voting is compulsory. | Luxembourgish citizens aged 18 or over on polling day and resident in Luxembourg.; European Union citizens aged 18 or over on polling day and resident in Luxembourg for at least 5 years. |
| Malta | Maltese citizens aged 18 or over on polling day. | |
| Netherlands | Dutch citizens aged 18 or over on polling day.; European Union citizens resident in the Netherlands, aged 18 or over on polling day and not deprived of the right to stand in their home country. | European Union citizens aged 18 or over on polling day.; Any people aged 18 or over on polling day and legally resident in the European Union at the time of candidature. |
| Poland | Polish citizens aged 18 or over on polling day who are resident outside Poland and registered to vote.; European Union citizens aged 18 or over on polling day who are resident in Poland. | European Union citizens aged 21 or over on polling day and resident in Poland or the European Union for at least 5 years, were never sentenced to imprisonment for a crime committed intentionally prosecuted by public indictment or for an intentional fiscal offence. |
| Portugal | European Union citizens aged 18 or over on polling day who are resident in Portugal and registered to vote.; Portuguese citizens aged 18 or over on polling day who are resident outside Portugal and registered to vote.; Brazilian citizens enjoying special status of equal political rights in Portugal (cidadãos brasileiros com estatuto especial de igualdade de direitos políticos) aged 18 or over on polling day who are resident in Portugal and registered to vote. | European Union citizens.; Brazilian citizens enjoying special status of equal political rights in Portugal (cidadãos brasileiros com estatuto especial de igualdade de direitos políticos) aged 18 or over on polling day who are resident in Portugal and registered to vote. |
| Romania | Romanian citizens aged 18 or over on polling day, regardless of domicile.; European Union citizens aged 18 or over on polling day and whose municipality of residence is in Romania. | European Union citizens who are entitled to vote. |
| Slovakia | | |
| Slovenia | | |
| Spain | Spanish citizens aged 18 or over on polling day.; European Union citizens aged 18 or over on polling day who are recorded in the register kept by the Municipal Council of their municipality of residence (Padrón) and have formally expressed their wish to vote in the European Parliament election in Spain. | European Union citizens |
| Sweden | Swedish citizens aged 18 or over on polling day who are, or at some time have been, registered residents in Sweden.; European Union citizens aged 18 or over on polling day who are current registered residents in Sweden and have submitted a notification to be listed on the electoral roll. | European Union citizens |

== Opinion polling ==
Opinion polling for EU Parliament elections is less common than for national parliament elections, and no polls are available on the aggregate level. Europe Elects introduced a monthly seat projection based on publicly available polling data in 2014. This was complemented in 2019 by a popular vote projection based on EU parliament groups.

== See also ==
- Democratic legitimacy of the European Union
- History of the European Union
- Appointment of the European Commission
- Law of 6 June 2000 (France)
