= Luxembourg (European Parliament constituency) =

Constituency of the European Parliament

- European Parliament constituency
- Location among the current constituencies
- Member state: Luxembourg
- Created: 1979
- MEPs: 6 (2004–present)

Luxembourg is a European Parliament constituency for elections in the European Union covering the member state of Luxembourg. It is currently represented by six Members of the European Parliament. Luxembourg uses the D'Hondt method.

== Returned Members of the European Parliament ==
Note on European parties: the Christian Social People's Party (CSV) is a member of the centre-right European People's Party, the Luxembourg Socialist Workers' Party is a member of the centre-left Party of European Socialists (sitting with S&D) and the Democratic Party (DP) is a member of the centrist European Liberal Democrat and Reform Party (sitting with ALDE).

MEPs for Luxembourg, 1979 onwards
Term	MEP party	MEP party	MEP party	MEP party	MEP party	MEP party
1979 (first)	Colette Flesch; DP	Jean Hamilius; DP	Victor Abens; LSAP	Marc Fischbach; CSV	Jean Spautz; CSV	Nicolas Estgen; CSV
1979 (first)	Colette Flesch; DP	Jean Hamilius; DP	Victor Abens; LSAP	Marc Fischbach; CSV	Marcelle Lentz-Cornette; CSV	Nicolas Estgen; CSV
1984 (second)	Colette Flesch; DP	Lydie Schmit; LSAP	Victor Abens; LSAP	Ernest Mühlen; CSV	Marcelle Lentz-Cornette; CSV	Nicolas Estgen; CSV
1984 (second)	Colette Flesch; DP	Jos Wohlfart; LSAP	Victor Abens; LSAP	Ernest Mühlen; CSV	Marcelle Lentz-Cornette; CSV	Nicolas Estgen; CSV
1989 (third)	Colette Flesch; DP	Ben Fayot; LSAP	Robert Krieps; LSAP	Astrid Lulling; CSV	Viviane Reding; CSV	Nicolas Estgen; CSV
1989 (third)	Lydie Polfer; DP	Ben Fayot; LSAP	Marcel Schlechter; LSAP	Astrid Lulling; CSV	Viviane Reding; CSV	Nicolas Estgen; CSV
1994 (fourth)	Charles Goerens; DP	Ben Fayot; LSAP	Marcel Schlechter; LSAP	Astrid Lulling; CSV	Viviane Reding; CSV	Jup Weber; Greens
1999 (fifth)	Colette Flesch; DP	Robert Goebbels; LSAP	Jacques Poos; LSAP	Astrid Lulling; CSV	Jacques Santer; CSV	Claude Turmes; Greens
2004 (sixth)	Lydie Polfer; DP	Robert Goebbels; LSAP	Jean Spautz; CSV	Astrid Lulling; CSV	Erna Hennicot-Schoepges; CSV	Claude Turmes; Greens
2009 (seventh)	Charles Goerens; DP	Robert Goebbels; LSAP	Frank Engel; CSV	Astrid Lulling; CSV	Georges Bach; CSV	Claude Turmes; Greens
2014 (eighth)	Charles Goerens; DP	Mady Delvaux-Stehres; LSAP	Frank Engel; CSV	Viviane Reding; CSV	Georges Bach; CSV	Claude Turmes; Greens
2019 (ninth)	Charles Goerens; DP	Nicolas Schmit; LSAP	Christophe Hansen; CSV	Isabel Wiseler-Santos Lima; CSV	Monica Semedo; DP (2019-2021); SE (2021-2024); Fokus (2024)	Tilly Metz; Greens
2019 (ninth)	Charles Goerens; DP	Marc Angel; LSAP	Christophe Hansen; CSV	Isabel Wiseler-Santos Lima; CSV	Monica Semedo; DP (2019-2021); SE (2021-2024); Fokus (2024)	Tilly Metz; Greens
2019 (ninth)	Charles Goerens; DP	Marc Angel; LSAP	Martine Kemp; CSV	Isabel Wiseler-Santos Lima; CSV	Monica Semedo; DP (2019-2021); SE (2021-2024); Fokus (2024)	Tilly Metz; Greens
2024 (tenth)	Charles Goerens; DP	Marc Angel; LSAP	Christophe Hansen; CSV	Isabel Wiseler-Santos Lima; CSV	Fernand Kartheiser; ADR	Tilly Metz; Greens

== Elections ==
=== 1979 ===
The 1979 European election was the first election to the European Parliament and the first for Luxembourg.

=== 1984 ===
The 1984 European election was the second election to the European Parliament and the second for Luxembourg.

=== 1989 ===
The 1989 European election was the third election to the European Parliament and the third for Luxembourg.

=== 1994 ===
The 1994 European election was the fourth election to the European Parliament and the fourth for Luxembourg.

=== 1999 ===
The 1999 European election was the fifth election to the European Parliament and the fifth for Luxembourg. The elections were held on 13 June 1999. Astrid Lulling and Jacques Santer (former Commission President) were elected for the Christian Social People's Party (European People's Party), Colette Flesch for the Democratic Party (European Liberal Democrat and Reform Party) and Robert Goebbels and Jacques Poos for the Luxembourg Socialist Workers' Party (Party of European Socialists).

=== 2004 ===
The 2004 European election was the sixth election to the European Parliament and the sixth for Luxembourg. The elections were held on 13 June 2004. The ruling Christian Social People's Party polled strongly, while the opposition Luxembourg Socialist Workers' Party lost ground.

=== 2009 ===
The 2009 European election was the seventh election to the European Parliament and the seventh for Luxembourg. The elections were held on 7 June 2009.

=== 2014 ===
The 2014 European election was the eighth election to the European Parliament and the eighth for Luxembourg. The elections were held on 25 May 2014.

=== 2019 ===
The 2019 European election was the ninth election to the European Parliament and the ninth for Luxembourg.

=== 2024 ===
The 2024 European election will be the tenth election to the European Parliament and the tenth for Luxembourg.
