= Meris Šehović =

Luxembourgish politician

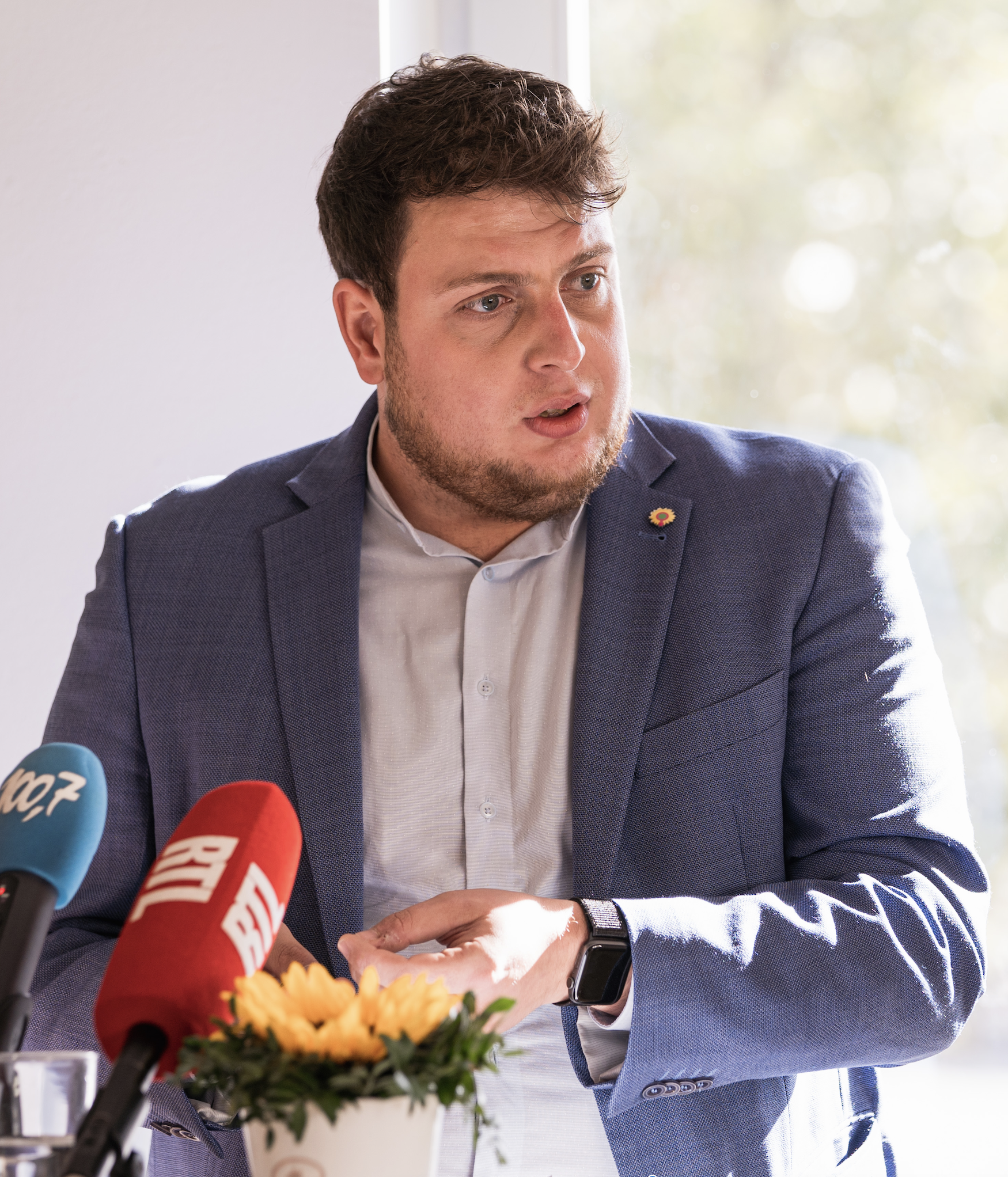
Meris Šehović (2021)

Meris Šehović (born 14 September 1991 in Belgrade) is a Luxembourgish politician and political scientist. Since 9 July 2020, he has been co-chairman of the Green Party (déi gréng) with Djuna Bernard. From 2017 to 2020, he was spokesman of déi jonk gréng, the political youth movement of the Green Party. Šehović was the lead candidate of the Green Party for the 2019 European Parliament election, together with Tilly Metz.

== Early life, education, personal life ==
Shortly after Šehović's birth, his family decided to leave war-torn Yugoslavia and flee to Luxembourg. Šehović completed his secondary education at the Lycée Classique d'Echternach. After graduating from high school, he began studying political science as a major and law as a minor at LMU Munich in the winter semester of 2011. He spent the winter semester of 2013 as an Erasmus student at the Institut d'études politiques ("Sciences Po") in Paris.

In his youth, Šehović was volunteering in centres for refugees run by Caritas. Since 2020, he has been a member of the Reflection Team of the Luxembourg Center against Radicalization. As a recognition for his national and European commitment, he was included in the Europe Future Leaders' cohort 2020 by the UK Foreign and Commonwealth Office.

== Political career ==
=== Beginnings in youth politics ===
In 2011, Šehović became a member of déi gréng. When the SREL scandal came to light in Luxembourg in 2012–2013, Šehović followed the political debates and Parliament's inquiry committee and commented the process in his own political blog. In the same time, he became member of déi jonk gréng, where he campaigned for reform of the Secret Service law and snap elections. From 2013 to 2017, he was a member of the board of déi jonk gréng. In 2017, he ran for spokesperson and held this mandate until February 2020.

=== European politics ===
In 2013, at the age of 22, Šehović became Head of Office and spokesperson for Claude Turmes, Member of the European Parliament. As a policy advisor, he supported legislative work on several EU directives and regulations in the areas of environmental, climate, industrial and trade policy (e.g. the EU Circular Economy Package, Right2Water, CO_{2} emission standards for new passenger cars) and assisted the MEP's work in the European Parliament's Committee of Inquiry to investigate the VW diesel scandal.

In 2017, Šehović supported Claude Turmes' work on a book about the European energy transition.

After Claude Turmes moved into national politics, Šehović entered the 2019 European elections as the lead candidate of déi gréng, together with Tilly Metz. Finishing seventh, he narrowly missed entering the European Parliament.

=== Chair of the Green Party ===
After Christian Kmiotek announced his resignation from the position of party chair, Šehović was elected by the Green Party's Congress on 9 July 2020 to succeed him as party leader. At the party congress on 20 March 2021, he was re-elected for another three years at the party leadership, together with Djuna Bernard.
