= Djuna Bernard =

Luxembourgish politician (born 1992)

The Honourable Djuna Bernard
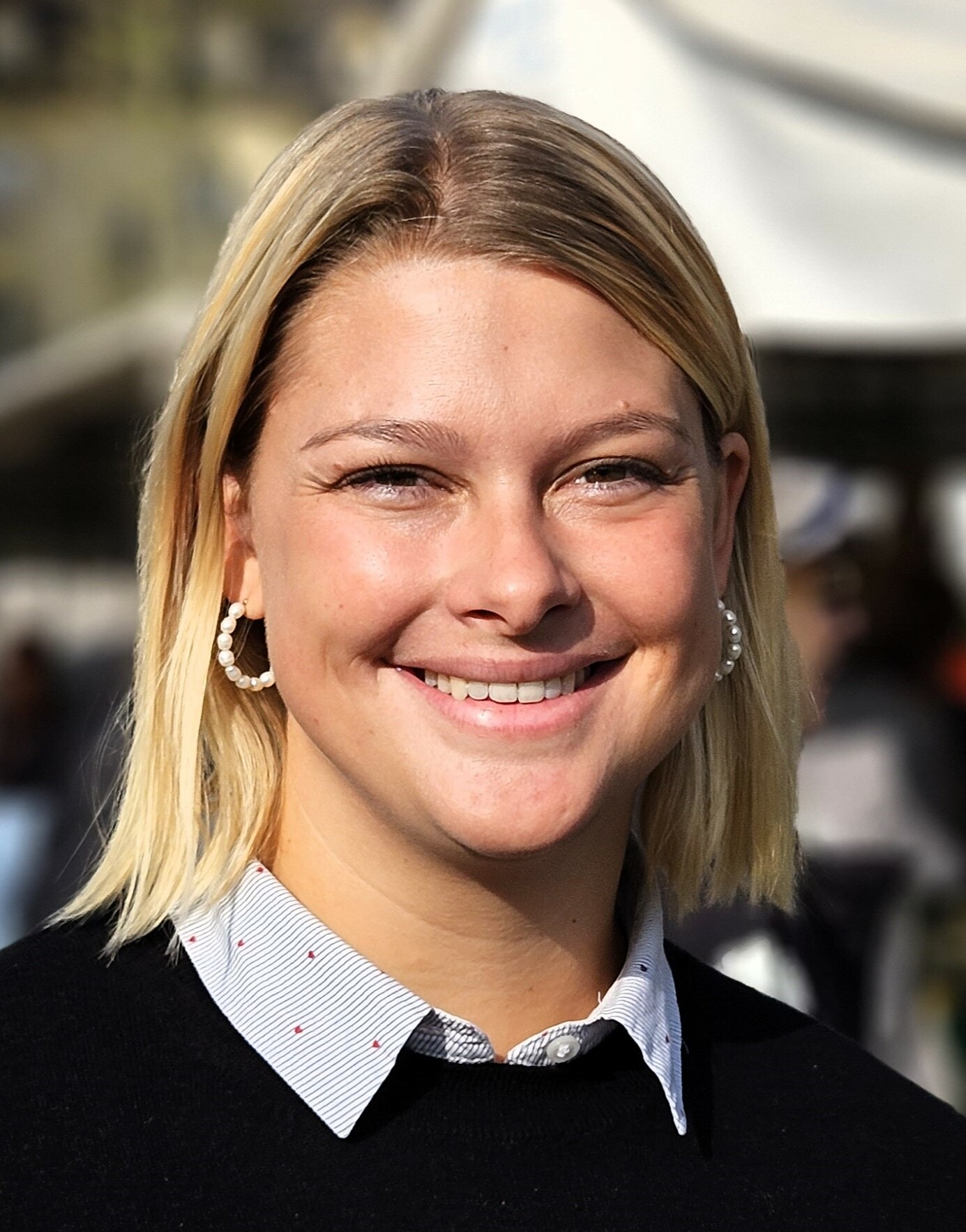
- Bernard in 2023

Member of the Chamber of Deputies
- Incumbent
- Assumed office 11 July 2024
- Preceded by: François Bausch
- Constituency: Centre
- In office 6 December 2018 – 24 October 2023
- Preceded by: Sam Tanson
- Constituency: Centre

Co-President of The Greens
- Incumbent
- Assumed office 16 March 2019 Serving with Christian Kmiotek (until July 2020); Meris Šehović (since July 2020)

Vice President of the Chamber of Deputies
- In office 10 October 2019 – 24 October 2023 Serving with Mars Di Bartolomeo and Claude Wiseler
- President: Fernand Etgen
- Preceded by: Henri Kox
- Succeeded by: Mars Di Bartolomeo; Fernand Etgen; Michel Wolter

Personal details
- Born: 15 June 1992 (age 34)
- Party: Déi Gréng
- Education: Heidelberg University; University of Luxembourg

Djuna Bernard (born 15 June 1992) is a Luxembourgish politician from Déi Gréng. She was a member of the Chamber of Deputies from 2018 to 2023, and again since 2024.

A candidate in the 2018 legislative election, she was not directly elected but replaced Sam Tanson on 6 December 2018 when the latter vacated her seat to become Minister for Housing and Culture, Aged 26 at the time, she became the youngest incumbent deputy. In October 2019, when Henri Kox resigned his seat to become Minister for Housing, she was elected to succeed him as Vice President of the Chamber of Deputies, a role she kept until the end of the legislature.

She stood as a candidate for the co-presidency of The Greens in January 2019, and subsequently won in March that year and currently serves with Meris Šehović. Bernard and Šehović were both re-elected unopposed in March 2021.

In October 2019, Bernard declared her intention to stand in the South constituency for the 2023 general election. She ended up standing on the party list for the Centre, winning 8,556 votes but failing to be elected. Her party lost 5 out of 9 seats, leading to the loss of the Bettel II Government's majority. She nonetheless returned to the chamber in July 2024 to replace François Bausch.

== See also ==
- List of members of the Chamber of Deputies of Luxembourg 2018–2023
