= Françoise Kemp =

Luxembourgish politician (born 1991)

The Honourable Françoise Kemp
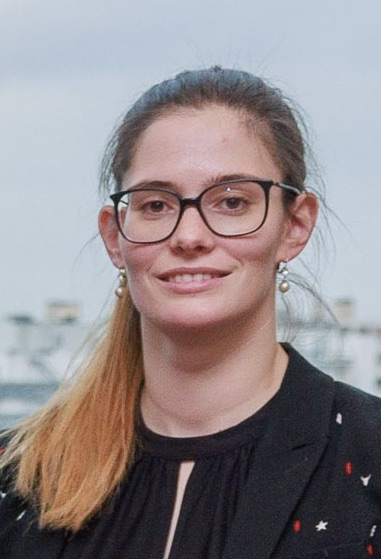
- Kemp in 2024

General Secretary of the Christian Social People's Party
- Incumbent
- Assumed office 21 November 2023 Serving with Alex Donnersbach
- Preceded by: Stéphanie Weydert; Christophe Hansen

Member of the Chamber of Deputies
- Incumbent
- Assumed office 21 November 2023
- Preceded by: Georges Mischo
- Constituency: South

Personal details
- Born: 24 April 1991 (age 34)
- Party: Christian Social People's Party
- Relatives: Martine Kemp (sister)

Françoise Kemp (born 24 April 1991) is a Luxembourgish politician of the Christian Social People's Party who was elected member of the Chamber of Deputies in 2023. Since 2024, she has served as general secretary of the party, alongside Alex Donnersbach. She is the sister of Martine Kemp.
