= Isabel Wiseler-Santos Lima =

Luxembourgish politician (born 1961)

Isabel Wiseler-Santos Lima MEP
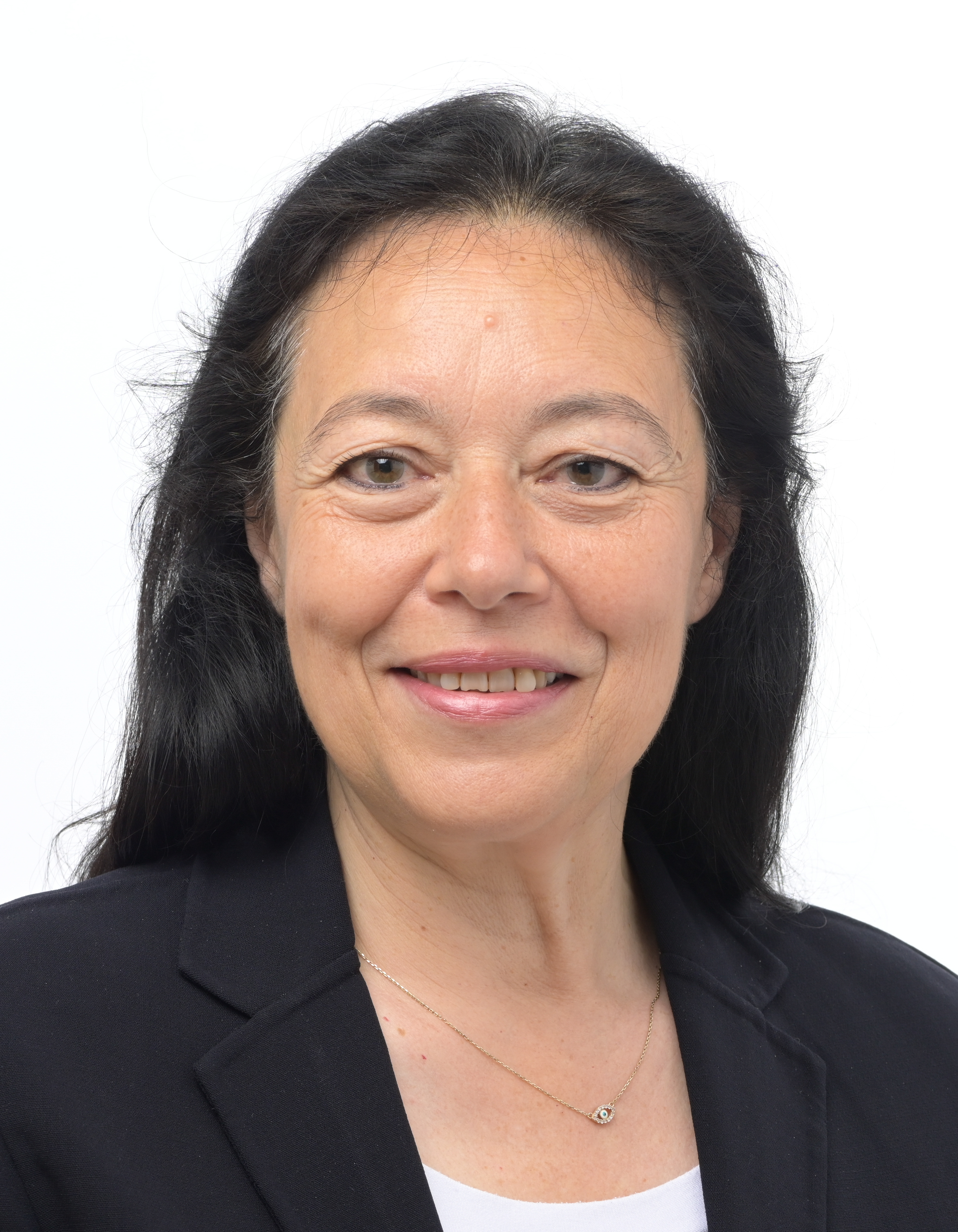

Member of the European Parliament for Luxembourg
- Incumbent
- Assumed office 2 July 2019

Personal details
- Born: Isabel Santos Lima; 29 December 1961 (age 64) Odivelas, Portugal
- Citizenship: Portugal; Luxembourg
- Party: Christian Social People's Party
- Spouse: Claude Wiseler
- Children: 3
- Education: University of Sorbonne Nouvelle Paris 3
- Profession: Politician

Isabel Wiseler-Santos Lima (born 29 December 1961) is a Portuguese-born Luxembourgish politician of the Christian Social People's Party (part of the European People's Party group) who has been serving as a Member of the European Parliament (MEP) since the 2019 European elections.

== Early life and career ==
Lima was born on 29 December 1961 in Odivelas, Portugal. She moved to Luxembourg with her parents at the age of three. She graduated from University of Sorbonne Nouvelle Paris 3 in 1984 with a master's degree in Modern Literature. The following year, Lima joined the Christian Social People's Party. After graduating, Lima became a teacher at the private school Fieldgen. She was member of the board of the school from 2013 to 2017.

== Political career ==
=== Career in local politics ===
Lima has been a municipal councillor of the city of Luxembourg since 2005. In 2017, she became an alderman in the council.

=== Member of the European Parliament ===
Lima stood as a candidate for the Christian Social People's Party in the 2019 European parliament election. She was elected as one of its two MEPs in Luxembourg. In the European Parliament, Lima is a member of the Committee on Foreign Affairs and the Subcommittee on Human Rights. Since 2021, she has been part of the Parliament's delegation to the Conference on the Future of Europe.

In 2024, Lima was re-elected to a second term with 58,307 preference votes.

In addition to her committee assignments, Lima is part of the delegation to the Turkey-EU Joint Parliamentary Committee. She is also a member of the MEPs Against Cancer group.

== Personal life ==
Lima is married to Claude Wiseler, current President of the Chamber of Deputies, and has three children. The couple met while at university.
