= Lydie Schmit =

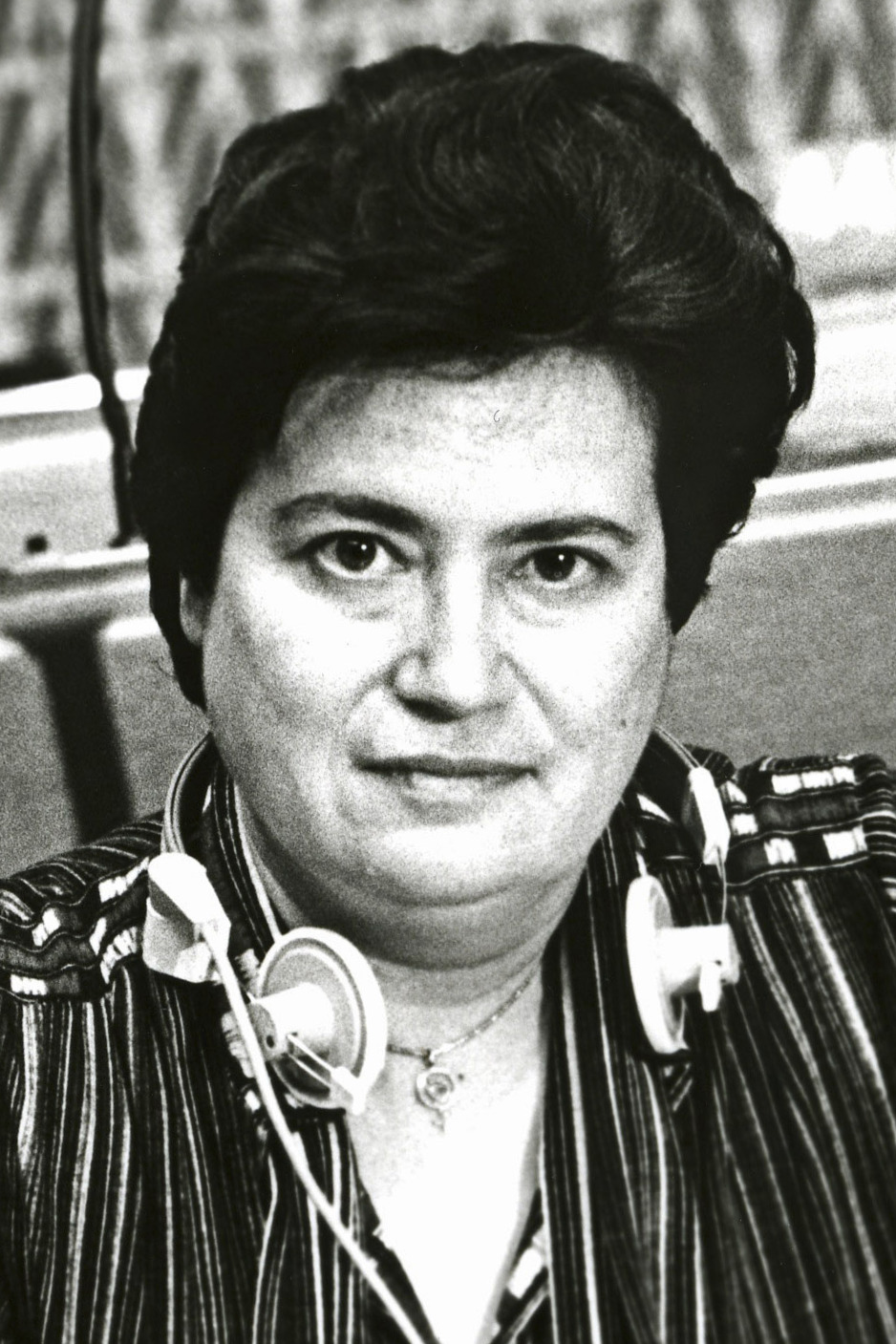
Image of Lydie Schmit in 1985

Lydie Schmit (31 January 1939 – 7 April 1988) was a Luxembourgish politician and teacher.

Schmit joined the Luxembourg Socialist Workers' Party in 1970. By 1974, she had been chosen as President of the party: a position that she held until 1980. She entered public office in 1976, when she was joined the communal council of Schifflange, of which she remained a member until her death. She entered the Chamber of Deputies in 1979, but only served for a year before leaving the office to work for the Socialist International, of which she was vice-president, as well as President of the Socialist International Women. She left these positions in 1984 to stand, and be elected, in the European election of that year. She sat in the European Parliament for four years, but died of cancer at the age of 49. She was succeeded as MEP by Jos Wohlfart.

Party political offices
Preceded by Antoine Wehenkel	President of the LSAP; 1974 – 1980	Succeeded by Robert Krieps
