= Martine Kemp =

Luxembourgish politician (born 1994)

Martine Kemp MEP
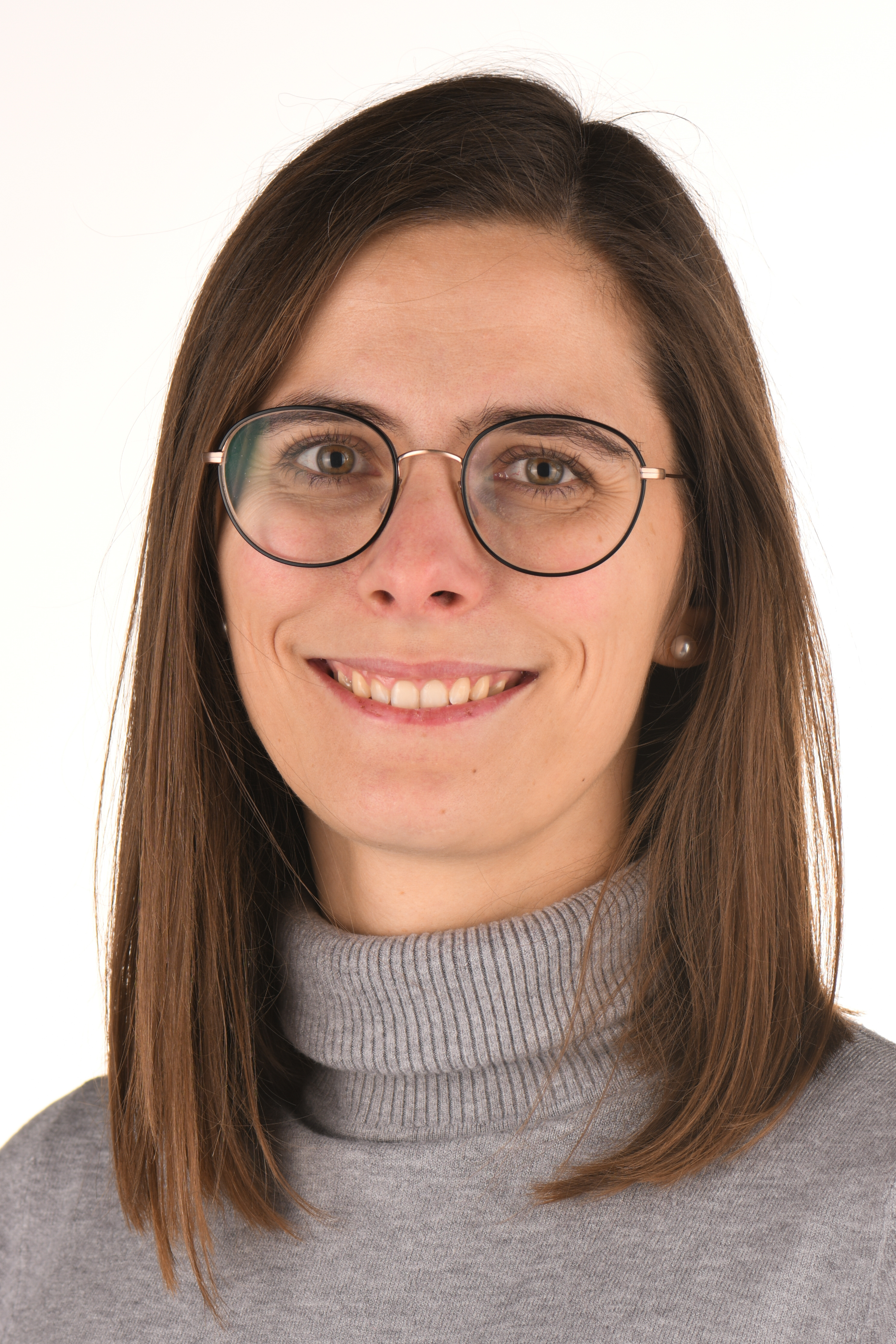
- Official portrait, 2023

Member of the European Parliament for Luxembourg
- Incumbent
- Assumed office 3 December 2024
- Preceded by: Christophe Hansen
- In office 23 October 2023 – 15 July 2024
- Preceded by: Christophe Hansen

Personal details
- Born: 8 July 1994 (age 32) Luxembourg
- Party: Christian Social People's Party
- Relations: Françoise Kemp (sister)
- Education: Vienna University of Economics and Business (BSc) Technical University of Darmstadt (MSc)

Martine Kemp (born 8 July 1994) is a Luxembourgish politician belonging to the Christian Social People's Party (CSV). She was a Member of the European Parliament for the European People's Party (Christian Democrats) from 2023 to 2024. She replaced Christophe Hansen, who decided to run in the 2023 Luxembourgish general election. She was not directly re-elected in 2024, but once again replaced Hansen after his nomination as Commissioner of Agriculture.

== Education ==
In 2017, Kemp completed her undergrad in social sciences, with a specialisation in logistics and finance, from the Vienna University of Economics and Business. Thereafter she continued her studies in transport engineering at the Technical University of Darmstadt, where she graduated in 2020 with a Master of Science in Traffic and Transport.

== Work experience ==
In between her studies, she completed an internship in the European Parliament in the office of Georges Bach (EPP), CSV’s last transport and train expert on the European stage. From 2021 until October 2023, Kemp worked for as a traffic-planning engineer for the City of Luxembourg.

== Political career ==
Martine Kemp started her political career at the age of 14 in the Youth Parliament in Luxembourg, where she sat on the executive board for two years before she joined the youth wing (Jeunesse Chrétienne-Sociale) of the Christian Social People's Party (CSV) in 2009. She later became vice-president of the Jeunesse Chrétienne-Sociale (CSJ). She was also a member of the CSJ National Committee as president of the schools and students’ section. In her hometown Dudelange, she was a member of the Youth Commission for CSV.

She holds the position of Secretary for International Affairs within the CSV.

== Political activity in the European Parliament ==
Kemp became Member of the European Parliament on the 24 October 2023 and primarily worked on three Committees:

- as a member of the Committee on International Trade (INTA)
- as a substitute on the Committee on Economic and Monetary Affairs (ECON)
- as a substitute on the Committee on the Environment, Public Health and Food Safety (ENVI)

In addition to her Committee assignments, Kemp was part of the Parliament's Delegation for relations with the countries of the Andean Community, Delegation to the Euro-Latin American Parliamentary Assembly, and the Delegation to the EU-Mexico Joint Parliamentary Committee.

Her most recent activities as a Member of the European Parliament included an opinion on the Union Customs Code and the European Union Customs Authority in the INTA Committee, for which she was shadow rapporteur for the European People’s Party (EPP).

== Personal life ==
Kemp is a member of the Unified Basketball Team of the Special Olympics Lëtzebuerg and participated with her team as a Unified partner at the 2023 Special Olympics World Summer Games in Berlin. She is the sister of Françoise Kemp. She was born in Luxembourg.

== See also ==
- List of members of the European Parliament (2019–2024)
