= Monica Semedo =

Luxembourgish politician

Monica Semedo MEP
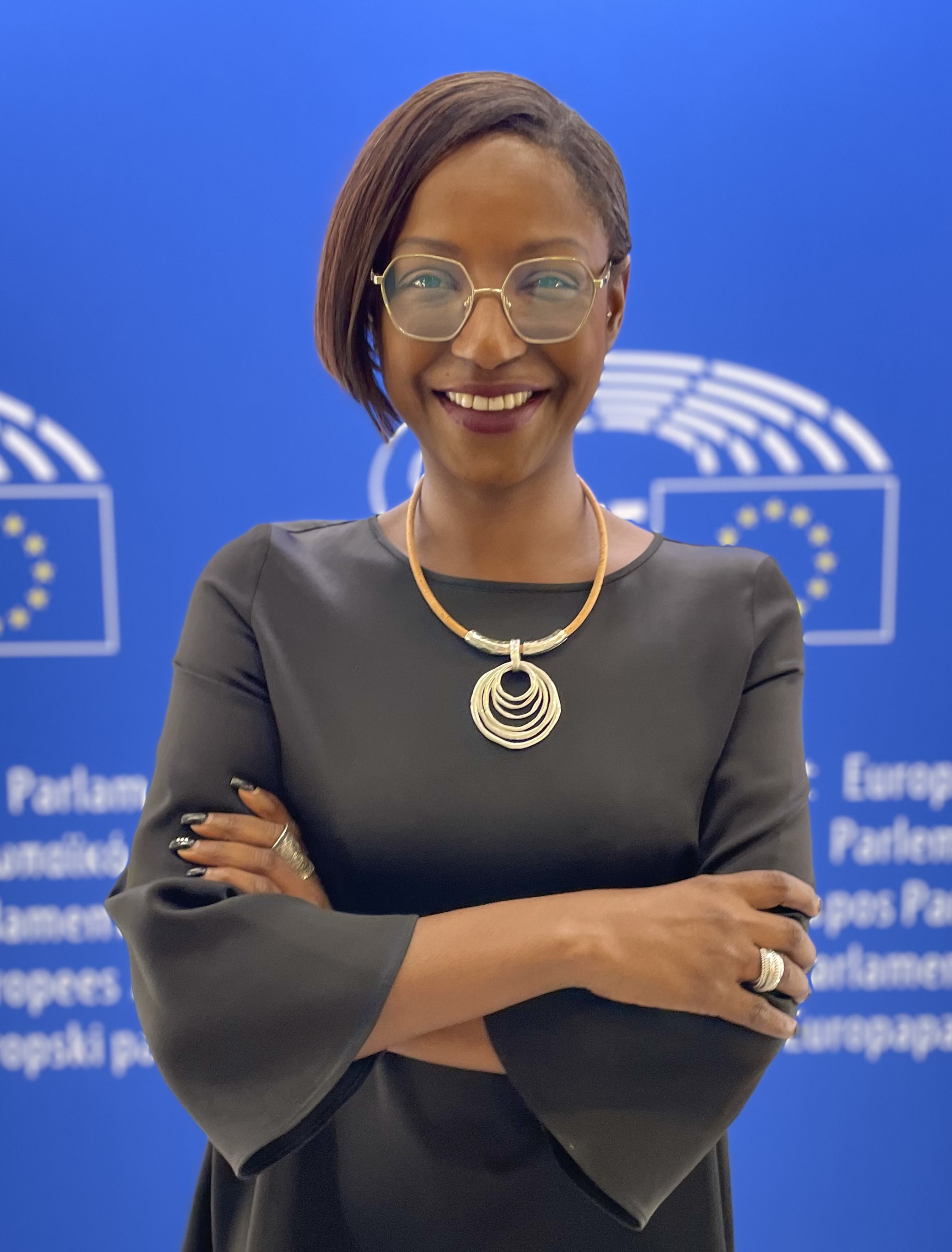
- Semedo in 2024

Member of the European Parliament for Luxembourg
- In office 2 July 2019 – 16 July 2024

Personal details
- Born: 15 June 1984 (age 41) Grevenmacher, Luxembourg
- Party: Fokus

Monica Semedo (born 15 June 1984) is a former Luxembourgish TV presenter and politician who served as a Member of the European Parliament after being elected in 2019.

== Political career ==
In parliament, Semedo has been serving as full member of the Committee on Employment and Social Affairs and as substitute member of the Committee on Economic and Monetary Affairs. In 2020, she also joined the Committee on Petitions and the Committee on Culture and Education. Since January 2021 she has not been a member of the Democratic party and is now referred to as an "Independent" renew Europe member. Semedo was suspended from her duties for 15 days and deprived of her parliamentary allowances for the same period for moral harassment of her three parliamentary assistants. The three had quit together last year.

In addition to her committee assignments, Semedo is part of the Parliament's delegation to the ACP–EU Joint Parliamentary Assembly and the MEPs Against Cancer group.

Semedo was the shadow rapporteur for her group Renew Europe on the Minimum Wage directive, meaning her group sends her to negotiate political compromises on its behalf. Semedo explains that the European Union wants to guarantee that each worker can live off that wage while contributing to society with the directive. The directive dictates Member States to fix and update the minimum wages to guarantee decent living conditions in the long term.

Monica Semedo was the shadow rapporteur for the report on the ESF+ and Creative Europe funds and Rapporteur for the Resolution on The Cultural Recovery and the Situation of Artists. Semedo was also the Co-Chair of the Social Economy Intergroup in the European Parliament.

In 2020 Semedo said she was shocked and very touched after seeing the footage of George Floyd who was a victim of police violence in the United States. She said in Europe people are also always afraid that this will happen to them. Semedo wrote a letter to Ursula von der Leyen asking her to make a clear statement on behalf of the European Commission against racism. 118 other MEPs signed the letter. Semedo said it is frightening that the anti-discrimination directive has been stalled for 11 years. The directive seeks to prohibit discrimination based on age, disability, religion or sexual beliefs and orientations. Proposed in 2008 by the European Commission, it was adopted in 2009 by the European Parliament. Since then, it has been blocked in the European Council. Semedo said she thinks it is time to find a way to put pressure on member states to finally move forward. This directive has to come out of the drawer it is in she said.

Semedo was the co-chair of the Disability Intergroup. Semedo has a rare disease herself, Wilson's disease, a rare inherited condition that causes copper levels to build up in several organs, especially the liver, brain and eyes and that caused her a visual disability. Her doctor diagnosed Semedo with a disability, a rare disease that affects her ability to see. Semedo is only able to use 25% of her sight, even with glasses. In the European Parliament she was supported by special tools and practices to simplify her work.

Semedo believes the European Parliament should raise awareness and promote inclusion, but also that concrete actions are needed. She constantly does this by paying extra attention to women, people with disabilities, youth and anti-racism, amongst other groups, in the work she carries out. For EU democracy, it is crucial that women with disabilities act as citizens, stakeholders or politicians she says.

Semedo said that being a woman in politics is already challenging. She said, "As a woman you have to prove yourself in order to get the same respect and recognition as your male colleagues or competitors, although you have the same skills’’. Being a woman and disabled adds difficulties to this, because as a person with a disability you are often perceived as less capable to do politics".

When it comes to public and political participation, Semedo explained that as in many other aspects of life, women with intellectual disabilities might suffer from different obstacles. Semedo highlights the need of representation to foster visibility in the public scene for other women with disabilities and encourage them to follow those steps. Semedo explained that the European Disability Strategy foresees that member states shall enhance accessibility via a National Action Plan, and digital accessibility is nowadays as crucial as physical. For example, she reported that often the digital exams you need to pass to become a civil servant might not be accessibility-friendly. This is especially the case for people who have an impairment, have dyslexia or are paralysed, blind and/or mute at the same time.

Semedo was also the co-president of the Intergroup Anti-Racism and Diversity in the European Parliament. Semedo also spoke out about her own experiences with racism and discrimination. As a journalist she had to endure longer airport checks, while her cameraman passed through security without any problem. Semedo said she feared for her life when she was surrounded by about 40 men during a concert in Moselle. The man intimidated her by showing a racist tattoo on his arm. She managed to escape with her friend. To young people she says it is important to defend your values in the fight against intolerance.

Semedo was the rapporteur for the legislative report on Quality Traineeships in the EU, ensuring that young people across the EU have access to paid traineeships that equip them with the necessary skills and learning experience to flourish in today's competitive job market. The adopted initiative acknowledges the urgent need to establish clear guidelines for traineeships across the EU. It sets standards for working conditions, accessibility, training content, mentorship, and adequate remuneration and compensation, in order to safeguard the rights and dignity of young trainees. The legislative initiative also seeks to promote access to traineeships for people from vulnerable groups, including people with disabilities. It aims to create an inclusive environment where all individuals have equal opportunities to participate in traineeship programmes.

As a member of the Committee for Culture and Education, Semedo advocated for the EU to include specific provisions in favour of accessibility and inclusion in its funding programmes such as Creative Europe or Erasmus+.

In 2022 Semedo was nominated for the MEP Awards in the category Best Young Leaders.

In February 2024, she returned to politics by joining Fokus (Luxembourg) as a candidate for the European elections in June.

== Personal life ==
Born in Luxembourg, Semedo is of Cape Verdean descent.

== Harassment case and annulment of findings in 2025 ==
In 2020, three of her former assistants filed complaints for psychological harassment. The parliamentary president David Sassoli stated in January 2021 that the accusations were found to be legitimate, leading to the suspension in any parliamentary meetings of 15 days. An official from Sassoli’s cabinet, who declined to be named, said that an investigation by the chamber’s Committee on Harassment had taken evidence from alleged victims, witnesses and experts and documented allegations of “countless offences, insults, aggressive treatment, intimidation and attacks in public” by Semedo against three of her former assistants. “The report is very serious,” the official said.

When the case started, Claude Lamberty, General Secretary of the Democratic Party, announced that there will be no political consequences for Semedo. However, once the press released that it was a dossier of over 100 pages detailing claims from staff members over her management style, the party decided to convey a disciplinary committee to see whether she could be subject to sanctions form DP's side. To this, Semedo resigned from the party and now sieges independently at the European Parliament.

In early 2022, Semedo faced new harassment accusations for a fourth and new assistant. A European Parliament anti-harassment procedure has yet to determine whether these allegations are correct.

In March 2025, the General Court of the European Court of Justice annulled harassment finding and penalties imposed against Ms. Semedo by the President of the Parliament. Monica Semedo said she initiated the procedure because of her deep belief in justice enshrined in the Charter of Fundamental Rights of the European Union. She refers to Article 48 of the Charter which guarantees the right of defence. The court determined that proper defense rights had been violated during the proceedings.

The ruling highlighted several procedural failures. Ms. Semedo received only summaries of witness statements rather than their complete substance. The Court noted that the summary of the statements sent to Ms Semedo did not reflect the substance of the testimony given during the investigation. She was also denied the opportunity to address the allegations against her directly. Monica Semedo could not be advised by a lawyer during the investigation. The European Parliament also prevented Semedo to speak about her case. Additionally, the Court found that Ms. Semedo was not informed of all written evidence used in the decision against her.

The General Court concluded that these failures to disclose relevant documents significantly impacted the lawfulness of the sanctions. The court determined that withholding evidence that authorities relied upon fundamentally hindered the accused's defense rights in a sanctioning procedure.
