= Viviane Reding =

European politician

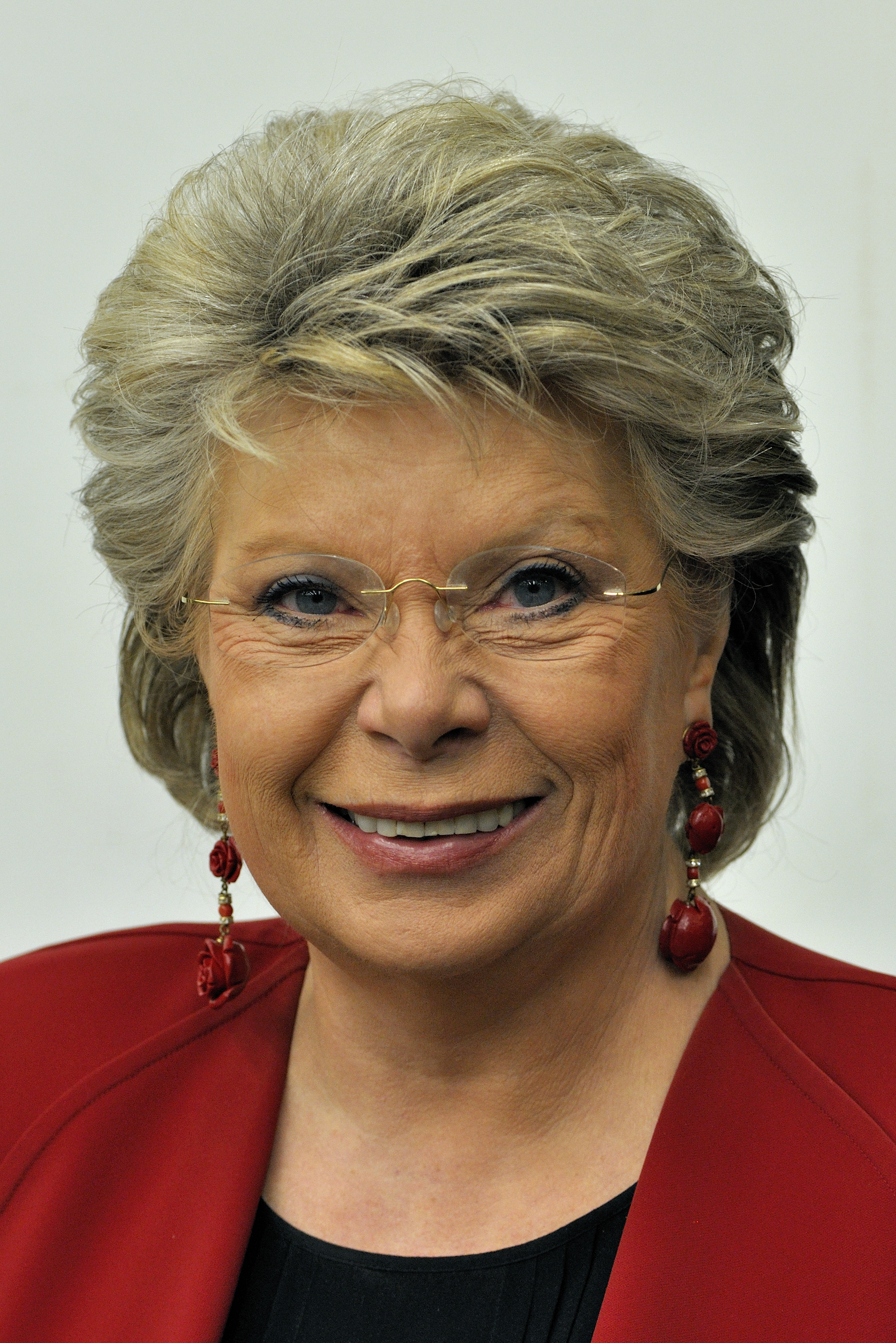
- Reding in 2014

Member of the Chamber of Deputies
- In office 30 October 2018 – 30 September 2022
- Succeeded by: Elisabeth Margue
- Constituency: Centre
- In office 13 July 1999 – 6 August 1999
- Constituency: Centre
- In office 6 July 1979 – 21 July 1989
- Constituency: Centre

Member of the European Parliament
- In office 1 July 2014 – 1 September 2018
- Constituency: Luxembourg
- In office 25 July 1989 – 15 September 1999
- Constituency: Luxembourg

European Commissioner for Justice, Fundamental Rights and Citizenship
- In office 9 February 2010 – 1 July 2014
- President: José Manuel Barroso
- Preceded by: Jacques Barrot (Justice, Freedom and Security)
- Succeeded by: Johannes Hahn (Acting)

European Commissioner for Information Society and Media
- In office 22 November 2004 – 9 February 2010
- President: José Manuel Barroso
- Preceded by: Ján Figeľ; Olli Rehn (Enterprise and Information Society)
- Succeeded by: Neelie Kroes (Digital Agenda)

European Commissioner for Education and Culture
- In office 13 September 1999 – 21 November 2004; Served with Dalia Grybauskaitė
- President: Romano Prodi
- Preceded by: Marcelino Oreja (Culture)
- Succeeded by: Ján Figeľ (Education, Training, Culture and Multilingualism)

Personal details
- Born: Viviane Adélaïde Reding; 27 April 1951 (age 75) Esch-sur-Alzette, Luxembourg
- Party: Luxembourgish; Christian Social People's Party; EU; European People's Party
- Spouse: Dimitri Zois (divorced)
- Children: 3
- Education: University of Paris

Viviane Reding (born 27 April 1951) is a Luxembourgish former politician of the Christian Social People's Party, part of the European People's Party. She served as Luxembourg's European Commissioner from 1999 to 2014, holding the portfolios of Education and Culture from 1999 to 2004, Information Society and Media from 2004 to 2010 and Justice, Fundamental Rights and Citizenship from 2010 to 2014. She was subsequently a Member of the European Parliament from 2014 to 2018 and of Luxembourg's Chamber of Deputies from 2018 to 2022, when she retired from politics.

Before starting a professional career as a journalist for the leading newspaper in Luxembourg, the Luxemburger Wort, Reding obtained a doctorate in human sciences at the Sorbonne. From 1986 to 1998, she was President of the Luxembourg Union of Journalists. On 27 November 2009, she was elevated in the "Barroso II Commission" to vice-president responsible for Justice, Fundamental Rights and Citizenship. She is also an advisor for the transatlantic think-tank European Horizons.

== Political career ==
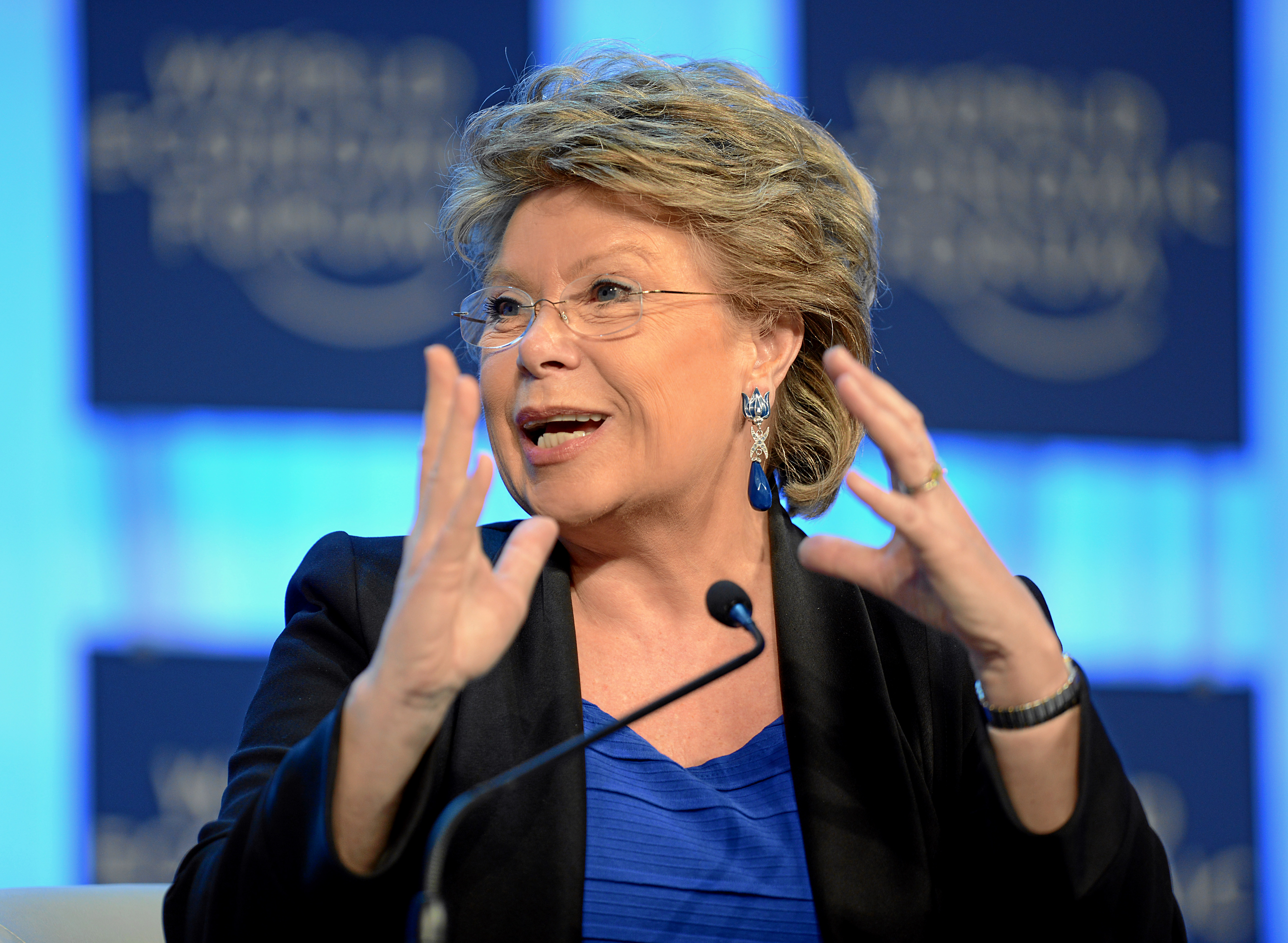
Reding during the WEF 2013

=== Role in Luxembourg politics ===
Reding started her political career in 1979 as a Member of the Chamber of Deputies and held the following positions:

- President of social committee
- Member of the Office of the Chamber of Deputies
- Member of the Benelux Parliament
- Member of the North Atlantic Assembly (leader of Christian Democrat/Conservative group)

From 1981 to 1999, she was Communal conciliator of the city of Esch, in which she was President of the Cultural Affairs Committee from 1992 to 1999.

From 1988 to 1993, she was national president of the Christian-Social Women and from 1995 to 1999 and president of the Christian Social People's Party.

=== Member of the European Parliament, 1989–1999 ===
Reding served as the leader of Luxembourg's EPP delegation in the European Parliament from 1989 to 1999 and she was a Member of the group's Bureau.

Within the European Parliament, she held positions as chairwoman of the Committee on Petitions for 3 years, and vice-chair of the Committee on Employment and Social Affairs and the Committee on Civil Liberties, Justice and Home Affairs for 2 years each.

=== European Commissioner for Education, Culture, Youth, Media and Sport, 1999–2004 ===
From 1999 to 2004, Reding was appointed Commissioner for Education, Culture, Youth, Media and Sport.

In her first term as European Commissioner Viviane Reding pushed through the Erasmus Mundus expanding the co-operation between universities and university students of the European Union and the rest of the world. Among other achievements she has also played a key role in strengthening the Culture 2000 programme and the EU MEDIA programme.

=== European Commissioner for Information Society and Media, 2004–2010 ===
In 2004 Reding became Commissioner for Information Society and Media.

While serving in the European Commission under President Barroso, Reding found a relatively popular policy in lowering roaming charges of mobile phones when travelling within the European Union, stating: "For years, mobile roaming charges have remained unjustifiably high. We are therefore tackling one the last borders within Europe's internal market". Her legislation to cap roaming charges was approved by the Parliament in April 2007.

On 7 April 2006 the commission launched the new ".eu" TLD for websites for EU companies and citizens wishing to have a non-national European internet address. This has proven popular with 2.5 million being registered by April 2007. It is now the seventh most popular TLD worldwide, and third in Europe (after .de and .uk).

In an unsuccessful bid to centralize regulatory oversight, Reding proposed in 2007 that the European Union Agency for Network and Information Security (ENISA) be folded into a new European Electronic Communications Market Authority (EECMA).

Reding also promoted the use of the 112, the Single European Emergency Number following the European Union Directive 2002/22/EC.

Reding also proposed that major European telecom companies be forced to separate their network and service operations to promote competition in the market. The companies, including France Telecom and Deutsche Telekom, would still own their networks but the separate management structure would be obliged to treat other operators on an equal basis in offering access to the network. This is opposed to separate ideas to force a full break-up of such companies.

In 2008 the European Parliament voted to pass the "Telecoms Package", which would render the entire market a region into one market, making it easier to sell internet and phone services in EU, with the goal of making the telecom prices cheaper for customers in European Union. Among the many amendments to the proposal, amendment 138 was voted in favour with 574 votes for, and 73 against. This particular amendment requires any termination of internet subscription to be heard in front of a judge. Reding is known as an advocate for an open Internet, resisting attempts in 2010 by her colleague, Swedish EU Commissioner Cecilia Malmström, to block access to websites. In 2012 she disputed with EU Trade Commissioner Karel De Gucht 2012 over the Anti-Counterfeiting Trade Agreement (ACTA). She favoured that amendment leading to the defeat of three-strikes policies such as those promoted by France's Hadopi law.

=== Vice-President of the European Commission, 2010–2014 ===
In June 2009, Reding was elected Member of the European Parliament, heading the list of the Christian Social People's Party.

On 9 February 2010, Reding was confirmed in her third term as European Commissioner becoming vice-president and commissioner responsible for Justice, Fundamental Rights and Citizenship. She was also given responsibility for the commission's Directorate-General for Communication. In May 2010, Reding succeeded in having the original Directorate for Justice, Freedom and Security split in two, with the resulting Directorate-General for Justice – responsible for civil and criminal justice, fundamental rights, and citizenship – subsequently being added to her portfolio.

Upon taking office she put in place a truly EU Justice policy launching a series of groundbreaking proposals in the field of civil, commercial and criminal justice in line with the ambitions set by the Treaty of Lisbon to establish a European area of justice. This included proposals to strengthen the rights of people in criminal proceedings, both as accused and as victims. Many of these proposals are becoming European law and consequently improving the rights of citizens across the European Union. She has also initiated a series of proposals aimed at making justice contribute for growth enabling both businesses and consumers to benefit fully from their rights in the European single market. These included proposals in field of consumer rights, in the field of cross order recovery of debts, sales law and data protection. Viviane Reding has also put in practice a fundamental rights culture across the European institutions and their policies. In October 2010 she set out a strategy and a methodology to achieve that end in line with the Charter of Fundamental Rights of the European Union. She has also put in motion a citizenship-centred agenda with the drafting of the first-ever EU Citizenship report in October 2010 proposing concrete measures to make European Union citizens' lives easier.

In addition, Reding also pushed for strengthening the EU's commitment to equality between women and men and consequently adopted a Women's Charter. Moreover, Viviane Reding has also presented measures to improve the representation of women in boardrooms of publicly listed companies. In September 2012 it became known that Reding was working on a proposal for introducing the 40% rule opening the way for women to be more represented in supervisory boards or non-executive board members of public listed companies in Europe. This proposal has generated a vocal debate across Europe with disparate groups of stakeholders in favour and against. In response to the specific opposition by a group of only male Ambassadors or Permanent Representative of European Union Member States Reding stated that "thankfully, European laws on important topics like this are not made by nine men in dark suits behind closed doors, but rather in a democratic process". After a long discussion in the European Commission Mrs Reding's ideas, shared, among others, by the President of the European Commission José Manuel Durão Barroso and the Commissioners with economic portfolios (Joaquín Almunia, Antonio Tajani, Olli Rehn, Michel Barnier and Laszlo Andor) prevailed over the views of fellow Commissioners such as Neelie Kroes, Catherine Ashton, Cecilia Malmström and Janusz Lewandowski and a proposal for a Directive was adopted on 14 November 2012. All major political parties in the European Parliament welcomed the proposal.

She also pushed measures to improve the rights of people with disabilities across Europe by eradicating discrimination on the grounds of disability and eliminating the barriers faced by Europeans with disabilities whenever accessing goods and services.

On 7 July 2010, Reding had an official meeting with the Secretary General of the Council of Europe, Thorbjørn Jagland, to launch joint talks on the EU's accession to the European Convention on Human Rights. On that occasion, she was assaulted by a man with mental health problems in front of the Palace of Europe.

On 11 July 2011, Reding expressed criticism of the power exercised by the three major US credit rating agencies stating that breaking up the big three was an option being considered. This criticism was followed on 25 July 2012 with a statement questioning the timing and motivations behind the US rating agency Moody's comments over European ratings, drawing links with rating announcements in Europe with attempts to divert the attention of the markets from the growing debt mountain and economic difficulties in the US.

In April 2012 Reding declined an invitation by UEFA President Michel Platini to attend the UEFA Euro 2012 championships citing "institutional reasons". She used the opportunity to invite UEFA "to take account of the dramatic situation of Yulia Tymoshenko" stressing that Europeans "cannot close their eyes on human rights even during a great sporting celebration". During the championships and in particular during the Germany vs. Netherlands match in Kharkiv she used her Twitter account to remind viewers about the plight of Ms Tymoshenko.

In December 2012, in an interview to the Daily Telegraph Reding dubbed as "crazy" the plans of United Kingdom Prime Minister David Cameron to opt out from EU co-operation mechanisms such as Europol, Eurojust and the European Arrest Warrant. In her opinion she stated 'Such move would leave the UK without access to important EU police and criminal justice databases which would risk transforming the UK into a safe haven for major criminals including paedophiles and drug traffickers'.

Her action in support of citizenship rights and the rule of law has put her on collision course with governments, of both sides of the political aisle, who attempt to use their government prerogatives to limit the independent role of courts, media or the conduct of elections. This stance in favour of democracy and the rule of law has brought her strong attacks by the right wing Fidesz controlled government of Viktor Orbán in Hungary.

In June 2013 at a citizens dialogue in Esch-sur-Alzette Reding commented on the revelations of mass-scale spying by the US National Security Agency on Europeans stating that "partners do not spy on each other", stressing that such behaviour by the US Administration risks undermining trade talks with the European Union.

In July 2013 Reding sympathised with the protesters in Sofia, Bulgaria, who called in the streets for an oligarch-free government. She has also called for political unity and consensus in Bulgaria.

Also in July 2013 Reding called on the government of Croatia to change its law. The Constitution of Croatia claimed that "A citizen of the Republic of Croatia cannot be exiled from the Republic of Croatia nor have his citizenship revoked, nor can he be extradited to another country.", which was changed in 2010., now saying "A citizen of the Republic of Croatia cannot be exiled from the Republic of Croatia nor have his citizenship revoked, nor can he be extradited to another country, unless a decision of extradition has to be made in accordance to the international contract(s) or EU acquis." Zakon o pravosudnoj suradnji u kaznenim stvarima s državama članicama Europske unije (ZoPSEU) (eng. The law of Judicial Cooperation in Criminal Matters with the Member States of the European Union) came into effect on 1 July 2013., the date Croatia became an EU member. As Croatia became a full-fledged EU member, European Arrest Warrants were sent to the addresses of Croatian judiciary institutions, a total of 84 warrants by 2 July 2013. at 10 AM. Although the warrants included the warrant for Josip Perković, the police did not detain him, as the felony he is charged with took place before 2002., and by the same criteria, 19 other warrants will not be considered. Viviane Reding urged the Croatian government to change this, as the media dubbed the problematic law "Lex Perković", and Mrs Reding threatened with diplomatic sanctions against Croatia. However, as Croatia wishes to be on par with other EU members, and in France the European Arrest Warrant is applied to felonies committed after 1 November 1993., and in Austria, Italy and Luxembourg after 7 August 2002., there seems to be no reason Croatia should abolish its 2002. rule, since a legal precedent in other EU member states exists.

In January 2014, Reding publicly announced that she has no plans to seek the nomination of the centre-right European People's Party for the presidency of the European Commission and that she supports the candidacy of fellow centre-right Luxembourger Jean-Claude Juncker. Johannes Hahn twice served as Acting Commissioner in her stead, from 19 April 2014 – 25 May 2014 while she was on electoral campaign leave for the 2014 elections to the European Parliament, and 1 July 2014 – 16 July 2014 after she took up her seat.

=== Future of Europe initiative, 2012 ===
In February 2012 Reding challenged her fellow European leaders to start working towards designing the future of the united European continent. In an article first published in The Wall Street Journal she called for a political union in Europe as a necessary step to transform the current European Union into a genuine economic, monetary and political union.

The Reding initiative led a group of foreign affairs ministers of the European Union to put together a reflection group animated by the German foreign minister Guido Westerwelle on the future of Europe. The plan also served as inspiration and guidance to the report prepared in June 2012 by Herman Van Rompuy, José Manuel Barroso, Jean Claude Juncker and Mario Draghi to the European Council on the need to develop the united European continent into a genuine Economic and Monetary Union.

In May 2012 Reding delivered a speech on the Future of Europe in Tallinn, Estonia at the XXV Congress of the Fédération Internationale du Droit Européen. On 12 September 2012 José Manuel Barroso delivered the State of the Union speech in Strasbourg, taking up and elaborating on many of the ideas set out by Reding since early 2012.

In November 2012 Reding further detailed her ideas in a speech in Passau, Germany and later in a series of articles and interviews calling for the establishment of the United States of Europe building upon the Blueprint for a Deep and Genuine Economic and Monetary Union presented by the European Commission on 30 November 2012.

As part of the European debate on the Future of Europe Reding initiated in late 2012 a series of Citizens Dialogues bringing European politicians into town-hall meetings with European citizens. These dialogues began in Cádiz in Spain in September 2012 and took place across Europe throughout 2013, the European Year of Citizens.

=== Member of the European Parliament, 2014–2018 ===
Following the 2014 European elections, Reding put herself forward as a candidate to be a Vice-president of the European Parliament. However she came in last in an internal vote to select the European People's Party Group candidates. She subsequently failed in her bid to become the EPP's candidate to chair the Committee on Legal Affairs.

Reding currently serves as a member of the Committee on International Trade. In addition to her committee assignments, Reding is a member of the European Parliament Intergroup on Long Term Investment and Reindustrialisation and the European Parliament Intergroup on the Digital Agenda.

== Controversies ==
=== Controversy over Roma ===
After the leak of a French Interior Ministry circular of 5 August 2010, Reding made a public statement that was interpreted as likening the 2010 French deportations of the Roma to those made from France by the occupying German forces during World War II: "I personally have been appalled by a situation which gave the impression that people are being removed from a Member State of the European Union just because they belong to a certain ethnic minority. This is a situation I had thought Europe would not have to witness again after the Second World War".

For a while, the French government's claim that it was expelling people on legal rather than ethnic grounds was claimed to be "openly contradicted by an administrative circular issue by the same government" mentioning the illegal Romani camps specifically ("en priorité ceux des Roms"). This mention could be explained by the fact that Romani account for the overwhelming majority of foreign migrants setting up camps in France, and that "most Roma from the two countries [Bulgaria and Romania] are thought to be in France illegally". The then French President Nicolas Sarkozy stated that his government had been unaware of the directive in question signed by Mr Michel Bart, the Chief of Staff of the French Minister of the Interior, and that the directive had been cancelled as soon as the government became aware of it through press reports. He stated that France continues to welcome refugees and that "we refuse the creation of slums... that are unworthy of French Republic or European ideals." President Sarkozy also stated that 80% of people removed from the camps during August 2010 were of French "gens du voyage", i.e. most of the campers thus removed were not foreign citizens or Roma; and that all removals were done based on judicial decisions, i.e. they were not unilateral police operations as would be based on a circular directive.

The French government further stated that Reding had made an "unseemly blunder" and defended France as "the mother of human rights." Mr Sarkozy denounced Reding's comments as "scandalous" and stated that "if Luxembourg wants to take in Roma, that is no problem" as far as France is concerned. This statement was based on Luxembourg's own rejection of migrants, yet Luxembourg's Minister for Foreign Affairs, Jean Asselborn, deemed it "malevolent". President Sarkozy pointed out that Mrs Reding had been silent during larger-scale expulsions by other countries in earlier years, including by Italy specifically of its Roma during 2009 and when police reject Romani travellers trying to enter Luxembourg. French Immigration Minister Eric Besson said that in her statement Reding "intentionally skids, if I may say, that is she uses an expression aimed to shock, that contains an anachronistic fallacy, and that creates a false amalgam".

While some media coverage and opinion leaders supported her actions, others called for her immediate resignation.

Following her initial statement, and intense discussions in the European Council and in the European Parliament, Mrs Reding announced that the European Commission intended to sue France at the European Court of Justice within two weeks. At the instigation of Mrs Reding, the European Commission later set up a Roma task force to analyse to what extent measures were being effectively taken to help the social and economic integration of Roma in Europe. Mrs Reding subsequently privately recanted the historical comparison in her initial statement. Her office apologised for the analogy. The European Commission subsequently declined to follow up on the earlier threat to sue France at the European Court of Justice, or to take other legal action on the Roma matter against France.

Subsequently, the EU said it would seek to compel European Union countries to amend their national rules to the requirements of the European Union's free movement laws, but in so doing did not deny the lawfulness of the French actions. Zoni Weisz, a Roma activist and Holocaust deportation escapee who addressed the German Bundestag's Holocaust Remembrance Day ceremony on 27 January 2011, praised Mrs Reding's 'clear words' in denouncing Roma expulsions. Hungarian MEP Lívia Járóka, the sole European Parliament member to have partly Roma heritage, described the root problem as "the failure of Roma integration in most member states in the last 20 years".

As a result of the action taken by Reding in the defence of the rights of citizens, national governments of the Member States of the European Union were obliged to put in place national strategies and concrete plans for the integration of Romani people and to report on their implementation annually.

In August 2012, Reding put the action of the French socialist government of Jean-Marc Ayrault and his Minister of the Interior Manuel Valls under surveillance responding to alleged expulsions of Roma people. The call resulted in a shift of policy by the French government confirmed in a Ministerial executive order signed by nine French Ministers and placing the focus of the action on the integration of the Roma as called for by the European Commission.

== Other activities ==
- Agfa-Gevaert, Member of the Supervisory Board
- Bertelsmann Stiftung, Member of the Board of Trustees
- Global Economic Symposium, Member of the Advisory Board
- Women in Parliaments Global Forum (WIP), Member of the Advisory Board
- UEFA Foundation for Children, Member of the Board of Trustees
- European Movement International, Member of the Honorary Council
- European Horizons, Advisor

There are several reports about Reding taking up jobs which are revolving door issues. Corporate Europa Revolvingdoorwatch

== Recognition ==
Reding has been awarded the following prizes and distinctions:

- 1992 – Creu de Sant Jordi (St George's Cross) from the Generalitat of Catalonia
- 2001 – Gold Medal of the European Merit Foundation
- 2004 – Doctorate Honoris Causa from the Fu Jen Catholic University of Taiwan
- 2004 – Doctorate Honoris Causa from the University of Genoa
- 2004 – Robert Schuman Medal
- 2004 – Doctorate Honoris Causa from the University of Turin
- 2005 – Gloria Artis Medal of Poland
- 2005 – Officer of the National Order French Legion of Honour
- 2007 – Internet villain award at the UK Internet Service Providers Association Awards
- 2007 – Deutscher Mittelstandspreis
- 2009 – Doctorate Honoris Causa from the Sacred Heart University Luxembourg
- 2010 – BeNeLux Europa award
- 2012 – Doctorate Honoris Causa from the University of Glasgow
- 2022 – The Grand Medal of Diplomacy from the Ministry of Foreign Affairs (Taiwan)

In 2012, the US-based magazine Foreign Policy ranked Viviane Reding at number 97 in its list of top 100 Global Thinkers recognizing her leadership in promoting the economic benefits of the role of women in top management and in the boards of companies.

== Personal life ==
Reding is divorced and has three children.

== Notes ==
Political offices
Preceded by Jacques Santer	Luxembourgish European Commissioner; 1999–2014	Succeeded by Martine Reicherts
Preceded by Marcelino Oreja as European Commissioner for Culture	European Commissioner for Education and Culture; 1999–2004; Served alongside: Dalia Grybauskaitė	Succeeded by Ján Figeľ as European Commissioner for Education, Training, Culture and Multilingualism
Preceded by Ján Figeľ; Olli Rehn as European Commissioner for Enterprise and Information Society	European Commissioner for Information Society and Media; 2004–2010	Succeeded by Neelie Kroes as European Commissioner for Digital Agenda
Preceded by Jacques Barrot as European Commissioner for Justice, Freedom and Security	European Commissioner for Justice, Fundamental Rights and Citizenship; 2010–2014	Succeeded by Johannes Hahn; Acting
