= 2004 European Parliament election in Luxembourg =

The 2004 European Parliament election in Luxembourg was the election of MEP representing Luxembourg constituency for the 2004–2009 term of the European Parliament. It was part of the wider 2004 European election. It was held on 13 June 2004. The national parliamentary elections took place simultaneously.

The ruling Christian Social People's Party polled strongly, while the opposition Luxembourg Socialist Workers' Party lost ground.

== Candidates ==
List #	Party	European Party	Existing seats
1	Alternative Democratic Reform Party (ADR)	Alliance for Europe of the Nations	0
2	Democratic Party (DP)	Liberal Democrat and Reform Party	1
3	Luxembourg Socialist Workers' Party (LSAP)	Party of European Socialists	2
4	The Greens	European Green Party	1
5	Christian Social People's Party (CSV)	European People's Party	2
6	The Left	European Left	0
7	Communist Party (KPL)		0

== Results ==
Party	Votes	%	Seats	+/–
Christian Social People's Party	404,823	37.14	3	+1
Luxembourg Socialist Workers' Party	240,484	22.06	1	–1
The Greens	163,754	15.02	1	0
Democratic Party	162,064	14.87	1	0
Alternative Democratic Reform Party	87,666	8.04	0	0
The Left	18,345	1.68	0	0
Communist Party of Luxembourg	12,800	1.17	0	New
Total	1,089,936	100.00	6	0
Valid votes	192,185	91.65		
Invalid/blank votes	17,504	8.35		
Total votes	209,689	100.00		
Registered voters/turnout	229,550	91.35		
Source: Public.lu

The Luxembourg electoral system allows each voter to cast as many votes as there are members to be elected. These figures show the number of votes cast for each party, not the number of voters who cast them. Voting at European Parliament elections is obligatory (as is the case with all other kinds of elections in the country).
