= 2014 European Parliament election in Luxembourg =

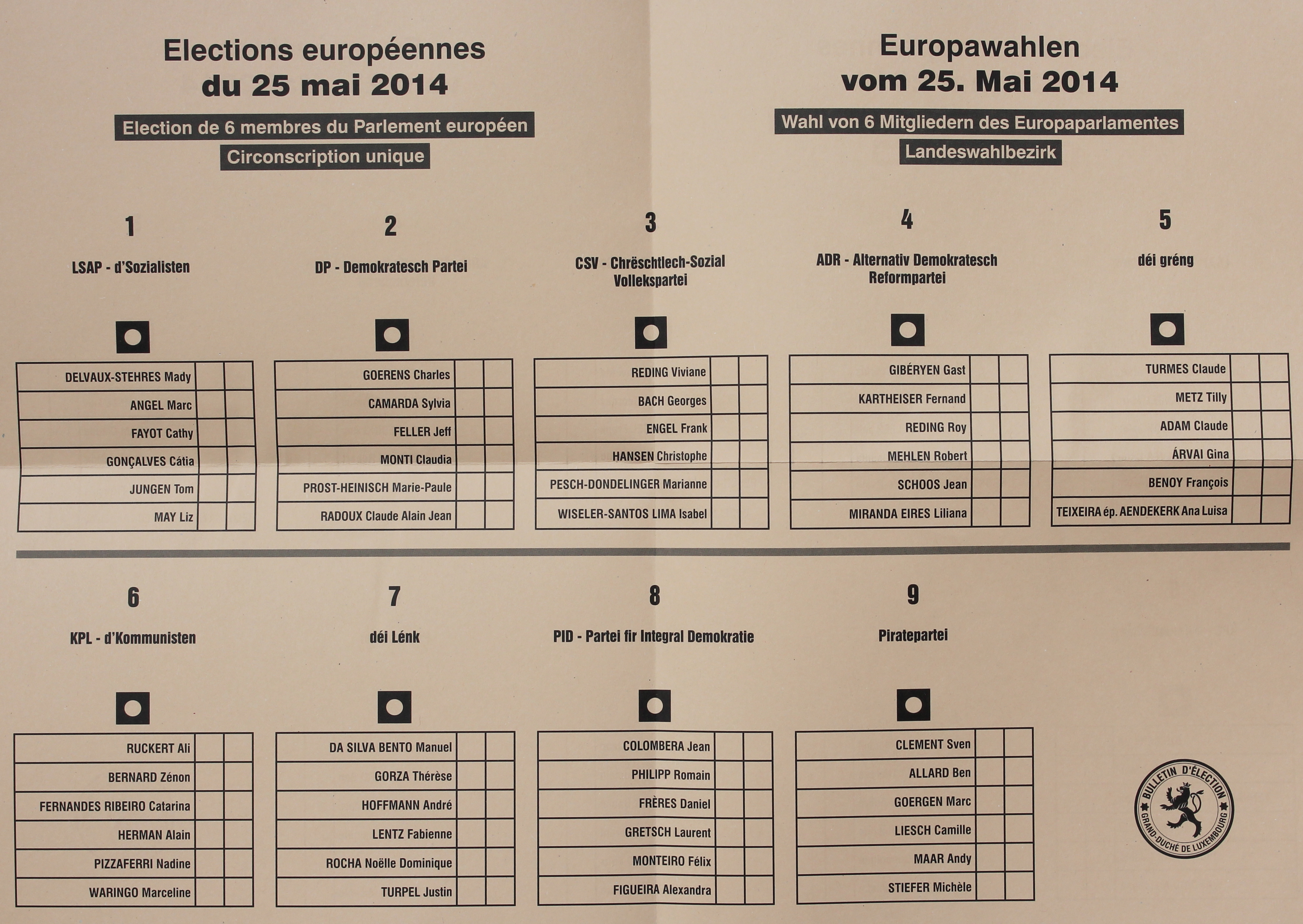
Ballot paper for the 2014 European Parliament elections in Luxembourg.

The 2014 European Parliament election in Luxembourg was held as part of the wider 2014 European Parliament elections. The Christian Social People's Party won three of Luxembourg's six seats.

== Results ==
Party	Votes	%	Seats	+/–
Christian Social People's Party	441,578	37.66	3	0
The Greens	176,073	15.02	1	0
Democratic Party	173,255	14.78	1	0
Luxembourg Socialist Workers' Party	137,504	11.73	1	0
Alternative Democratic Reform Party	88,298	7.53	0	0
The Left	67,544	5.76	0	0
Pirate Party Luxembourg	49,553	4.23	0	New
Party for Full Democracy	21,303	1.82	0	New
Communist Party of Luxembourg	17,506	1.49	0	0
Total	1,172,614	100.00	6	0
Valid votes	203,772	90.08		
Invalid/blank votes	22,446	9.92		
Total votes	226,218	100.00		
Registered voters/turnout	264,433	85.55		
Source: Public.lu

=== Elected members ===
- Viviane Reding (CSV) (126.888 votes)
- Charles Goerens (DP) (82.975 votes)
- Claude Turmes (Déi Gréng) (69.797 votes)
- Georges Bach (CSV) (68.242 votes)
- Frank Engel (CSV) (65.884 votes)
- Mady Delvaux-Stehres (LSAP) (33.323 votes)
