= Georges Bach =

Luxembourgish politician

Georges Bach MEP
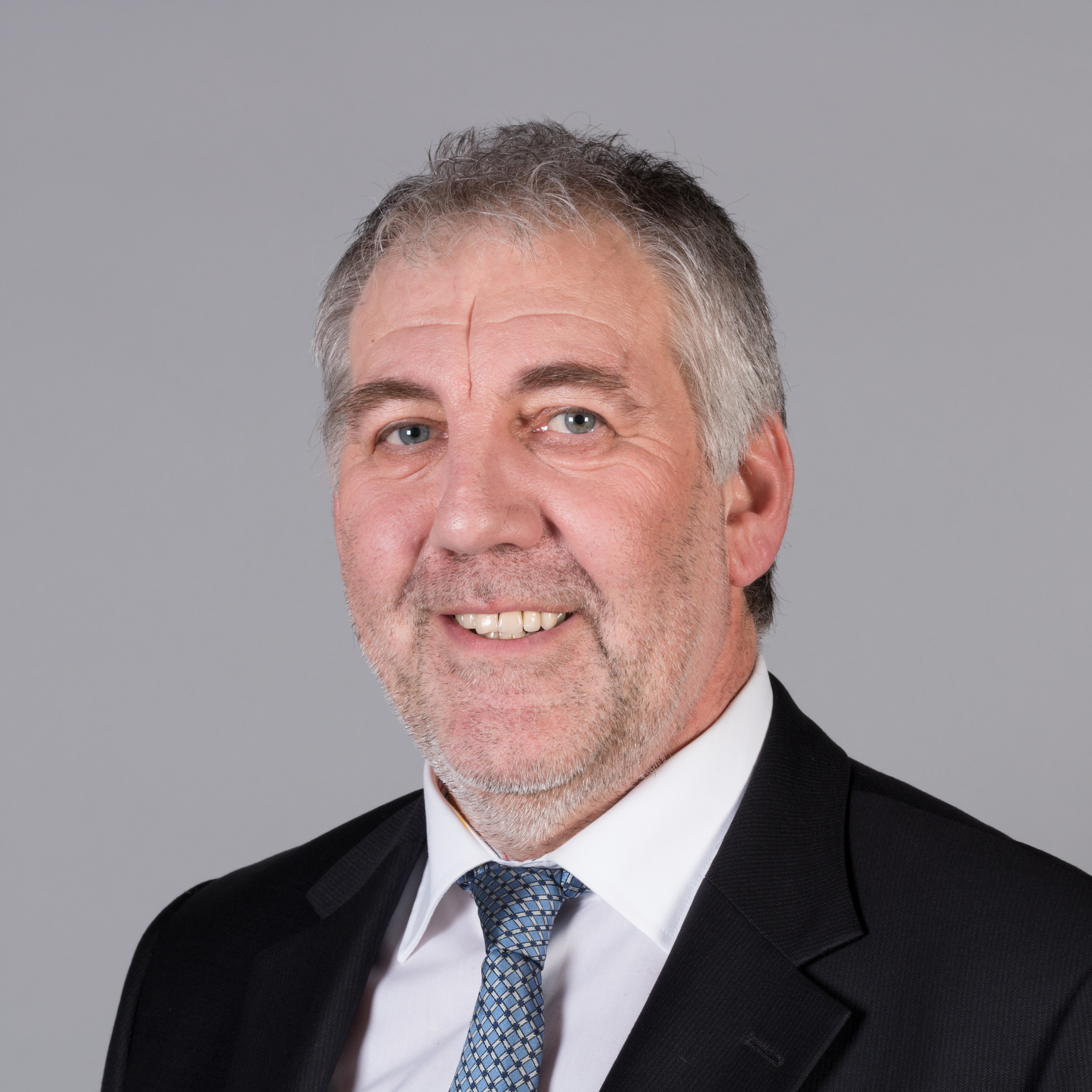

Member of the European Parliament
- In office 2009–2019
- Constituency: Luxembourg

Personal details
- Born: Georges François Bach; 12 June 1955 (age 71) Luxembourg City, Luxembourg
- Party: Luxembourgish; Christian Social People's Party; EU; European People's Party
- Education: University of Amsterdam

Georges François Bach (born 12 June 1955) is a Luxembourgish politician who served as a Member of the European Parliament from 2009 until 2019. He is a member of the Christian Social People's Party, part of the European People's Party.

He served as Chairman of the Union of Luxembourgish railway employees SYPROLUX from 2003 to 2009.
