= 1984 European Parliament election in Luxembourg =

- 14–17 June 1984

6 seats to the European Parliament

The 1984 European Parliament election in Luxembourg was the election of the delegation from Luxembourg to the European Parliament in 1984. It was held on 17 June 1984, the same day as the legislative elections to the Chamber of Deputies.

== Results ==
Party	Votes	%	Seats	+/–
Christian Social People's Party	345,586	34.90	3	0
Luxembourg Socialist Workers' Party	296,382	29.93	2	+1
Democratic Party	218,481	22.07	1	–1
The Greens	60,152	6.08	0	New
Communist Party of Luxembourg	40,395	4.08	0	0
Independent Socialist Party	25,355	2.56	0	New
Revolutionary Communist League	3,791	0.38	0	0
Total	990,142	100.00	6	0
Valid votes	173,888	90.75		
Invalid/blank votes	17,714	9.25		
Total votes	191,602	100.00		
Registered voters/turnout	215,792	88.79		
Source: Public.lu
