= Tilly Metz =

Luxembourgish politician

Tilly Metz MEP
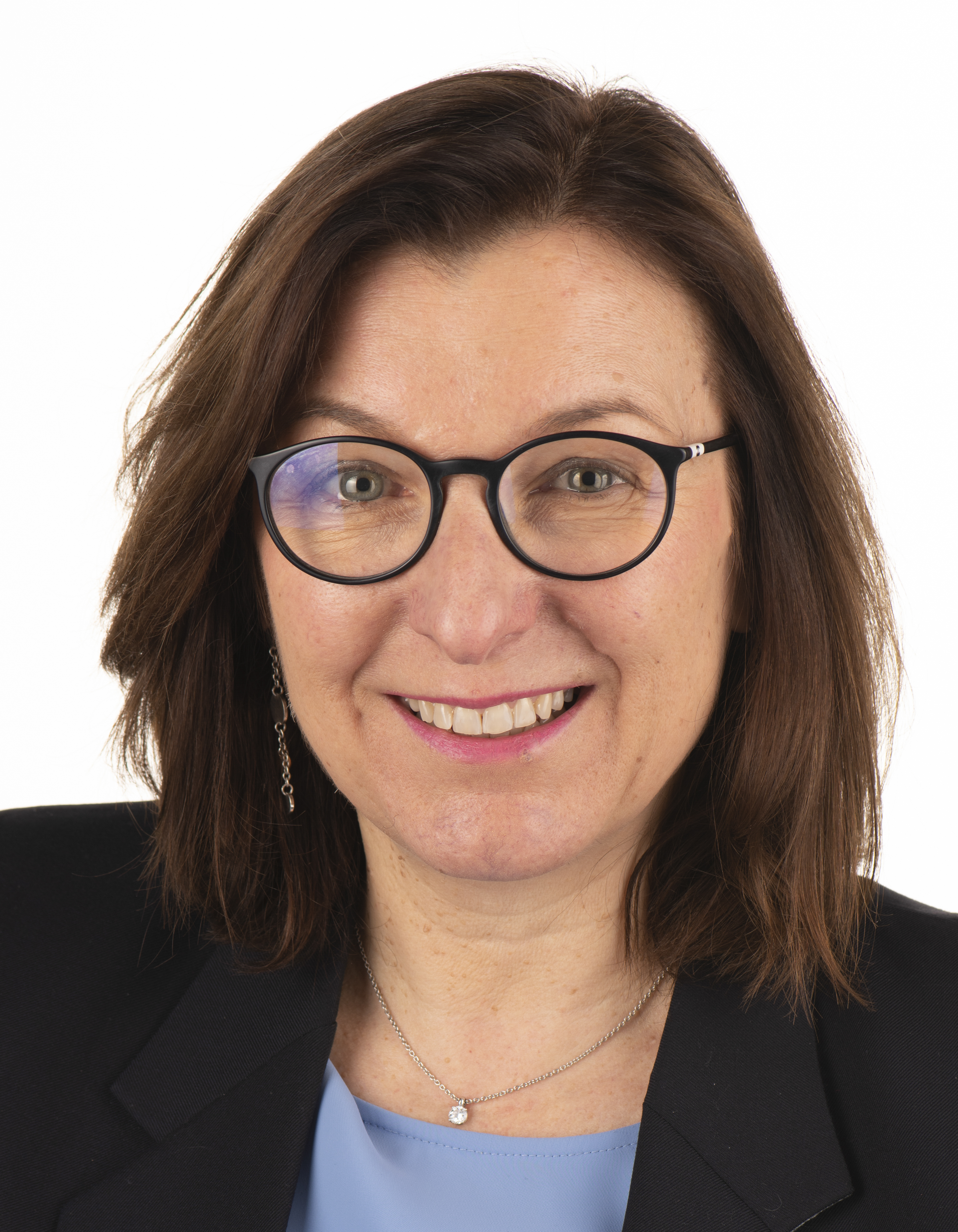
- Official portrait, 2023

Vice-President of the European Parliament
- Incumbent
- Assumed office 12 November 2026
- Preceded by: Nicolae Ștefănuță

Member of the European Parliament for Luxembourg
- Incumbent
- Assumed office 20 June 2018
- Preceded by: Claude Turmes

Mayor of Weiler-la-Tour
- In office 2005–2011
- Preceded by: Edmond Schlentz
- Succeeded by: Cécile Hemmen

Personal details
- Born: 26 May 1967 (age 59) Luxembourg City, Luxembourg
- Party: The Greens
- Occupation: Politician

Mathilde Fernande "Tilly" Metz (born 26 May 1967) is a Luxembourgish politician of the Green Party (The Greens). After teaching humanities and social sciences, she was appointed as deputy director of the Lycée Technique pour Professions Educatives et Sociales (LTPES) in Mersch. She has served as a Member of the European Parliament since June 2018, as part of the Greens/EFA political group, and was previously the mayor of Weiler-la-Tour. She is particularly known for her stance on animal welfare, health-related issues and human rights. She was elected Vice-President of the European Parliament in November 2026.

== Political career ==
=== Local politics ===
During her studies in psychology and pedagogy, Metz became involved in politics within the Luxembourg Socialist Workers' Party, via the Michel Welter Circle, which is mainly dedicated to health, education and disability issues. In 2001, she joined the Greens and became spokesperson from 2004 to 2009.

In 2005, Metz was elected as mayor of the commune of Weiler-la-Tour, serving in the position until 2011. She was the first female mayor of the municipality and the first elected member of The Greens. She served on the Luxembourg City Communal Council from 2017 to 2018.

=== Member of the European Parliament ===
In 2018, Metz succeeded Claude Turmes in the European Parliament, who had to leave his duties to replace junior minister Camille Gira, who died on 16 May 2018. She became a member of the European Parliament with The Greens/EFA political group.

In 2024, Metz assumed the role of first chair vice-president for the Subcommittee on Public Health (SANT). She is also a permanent member of the Committee on the Environment, Public Health and Food Safety (ENVI), and the Delegation for relations with South Africa (D-ZA). She is an alternate member of the Committee on Agriculture and Sustainable Development (AGRI) and the Committee on Transport and Tourism (TRAN).

In the European Parliament, Metz also chaired the Delegation for relations with Central American countries (DCAM) from 2019 to June 2024.

Metz chaired the special ANIT inquiry committee, which was created in June 2020, for a period of twelve months, and was responsible for examining allegations of infringements in the application of Union law on the protection of animals during transport and related operations inside and outside the Union.

On 12 November 2026, Metz was elected Vice-President of the European Parliament.

== Advocacy ==
=== Environment ===
Having participated in the drafting of the report "From Farm to Fork", she denounces the increasingly intensive agricultural policy oriented towards exports and the consequences of which are harmful to the environment. Legislation aiming to reduce the use of pesticides comes up against the powerful lobbies of the agro-industry.

Concerning the Common Agricultural Policy (CAP), which represents almost a third of the European Union's budget, Metz regrets the lack of ambition and says that: "For the reform of the Common Agricultural Policy (2021-2027), I would have liked to see clear political objectives that would contribute to achieving the EU's climate objectives, to curb the disappearance of species and to encourage small farms rather than multinationals. Unfortunately, neither the current nor the future CAP has achieved these goals".

As a member of the Transport and Tourism Committee in the European Parliament, Metz is the voice of the Greens/EFA for a more sustainable tourism industry. She has also contributed to the legislation aiming at setting up a social climate fund to compensate for the increase in energy prices that weighs on the most economically and socially disadvantaged households.

=== Health ===
Metz is very involved in the cause of rare diseases and disabilities. For 11 years, she was president of the association "Multiple Sclérose Lëtzebuerg" which aims to improve and facilitate the daily life of people with multiple sclerosis and their integration into society. It emphasizes the importance of access to rapid diagnosis and assistance to patients and their families during treatment.

In the European Parliament and in particular in the ENVI Committee, Metz is actively working on health issues. She has been a shadow negotiator for the Greens/EFA Group on several occasions, including the vote on the report on a pharmaceutical strategy and the proposal for a regulation of the European Parliament and of the Council on a stronger role for the European Medicines Agency in crisis preparedness and management as regards medicinal products and medical devices.

Metz was an alternate member of the Special Commission for Cancer Control in Europe (BECA), which was created in response to the growing prevalence of cancer in Europe. Indeed, it is estimated that 2.7 million new cases of cancer are diagnosed and 1.3 million people will have died of cancer in the EU by 2020.

With the creation of a special committee ''the COVID-19 pandemic: lessons learned and recommendations for the future'', Metz was chosen by the Greens/EFA Group to be the rapporteur on the future work of this committee on health.

In 2023, she signed a letter to the European Medicines Agency expressing concern about the lack of regulatory advances regarding psychedelic-assisted therapy. During the same year, she assumed the role of vice-president for the Subcommittee on Public Health (SANT).

=== Human Rights ===
Metz is involved in the cause of human rights, notably through her presidency of the Delegation for relations with the countries of Central America (DCAM) in the European Parliament. It informs itself and organizes work on the political, economic, social, legal and human rights situation in the nine partner countries of Belize, Costa Rica, Cuba, the Dominican Republic, El Salvador, Guatemala, Honduras, Nicaragua and Panama. Its priorities are the protection of human rights, the rights of women and the LGBTQ+ community, as well as the protection of indigenous peoples and environmental defenders in this region.

She was particularly impacted by the case of Aura Lolita Chavez during a visit to Guatemala in 2018. This minority rights and environmental activist was a finalist for the Sakharov Prize in 2017.

=== Animal Welfare ===
Metz was particularly committed to the fight for animal welfare in the early years of her term. She was appointed as the head of commission of inquiry into the protection of animals during transport, the final report of which was approved in December 2021. She said that "It is important to ensure the same level of protection of animals during the entire journey, just as it is essential for transporters and drivers to have a single set of rules to comply with on cross-border transport." She denounced the excessive duration of animal transports, especially during journeys beyond the borders of the European Union. She also denounces the lack of harmonization of rules, controls and sanction systems within the European Union. The report recommends the establishment of criteria for transport vehicles.

According to her, citizens' initiatives such as "End the Cage Age", which received 1,397,113 signatures, have had a real impact on the work of the European Commission, which initiates legislation applicable to the countries of the European Union. Metz believes that "for many citizens, the primary motivation in calling for stricter rules and more sanctions is an ethical concern, a desire to see animal suffering avoided or at least reduced. So for them, any improvement would be a gain in itself, in addition to the reduction of public health risks and environmental concerns".

Metz is also opposing animal testing, believing that more efficient and ethical alternatives often exist. She considers it a victory that the European Parliament voted in favor of an action plan to phase out the use of animals in scientific experiments and tests. However, the text adopted is not binding on the Member States.

=== Nuclear Weapons ===
In February 2019, Metz demonstrated alongside two other MEPs from the Green Group (Molly Scott Cato and Michèle Rivasi); as well as other Belgian activists from the organization Agir pour la Paix at the military base of Kleine-Brogel (Belgium) by blocking the runway for F16s. The three women wanted to draw attention to the US nuclear weapons that have been stored at the base since 1984 and to demand their removal. They continue to deplore the presence of the US nuclear weapons on European territory, particularly in the Netherlands and Italy. This poses significant security risks to the population, as the stockpiles are vulnerable to targeted attacks.
