= Claude Turmes =

Luxembourgish politician

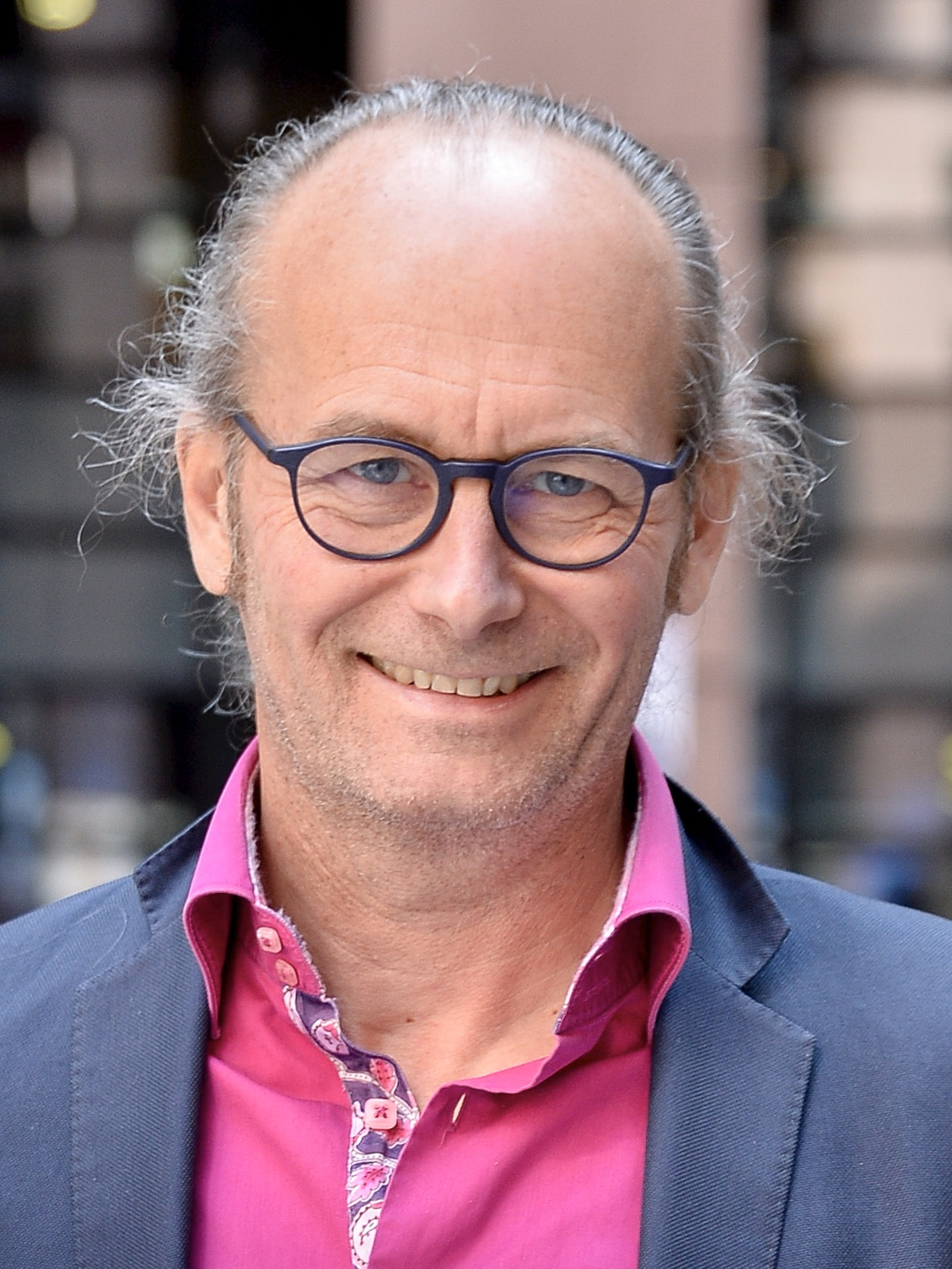
- Turmes in 2018

Minister for Territorial Planning and Energy
- In office 5 December 2018 – 17 November 2023
- Prime Minister: Xavier Bettel
- Government: Bettel II
- Preceded by: Position created
- Succeeded by: Lex Delles (Energy); Claude Meisch (Territorial Planning)

Member of the European Parliament
- In office 1 July 2009 – 19 June 2018
- Succeeded by: Tilly Metz
- Constituency: Luxembourg

Personal details
- Born: 26 November 1960 (age 65) Diekirch, Luxembourg
- Party: Luxembourgish: Green Party; EU: European Green Party

Claude Turmes (born 26 November 1960) is a Luxembourgish politician who served as a Member of the European Parliament (MEP) from 1999 until 2018. He is a member of the Green Party, part of the European Green Party.

== Political career ==
=== Member of the European Parliament, 1999–2018 ===
Turmes was elected as a member of the European Parliament in the 1999 European elections. In parliament, he first served on the Committee on Budgetary Control before joining the Committee on Industry, Research and Energy in 2002. In this capacity, he served as rapporteur on the 2008 draft of the EU Renewable Energy Directive 2009/28/EC and on the EU Energy Efficiency Directive 2012. Between 2007 and 2008, he was a member of the Temporary Committee on Climate Change. He also represented the Parliament at the 2008 United Nations Climate Change Conference in Poznań, and the 2016 United Nations Climate Change Conference in Marrakesh.

In 2011, Turmes was part of a cross-party working group headed by Jerzy Buzek, the President of the European Parliament, to draft reforms on lobbying and MEPs’ rules of conduct. In addition to his committee assignments, Turmes was a member of the European Parliament Intergroup on LGBT Rights and of the European Parliament Intergroup on the Welfare and Conservation of Animals.

=== Career in national politics ===
Turmes became Secretary of State for Sustainable Development and Infrastructures for the Luxembourg government in June 2018, and served as Minister for Energy and Minister for Spatial Planning from 5 December 2018 until 2023.

== Other activities ==
- Energy Watch Group (EWG), Member
- European Forum for Renewable Energy Sources (EUFORES), President
- Agora Energiewende, Member of the Council
