= 2019 European Parliament election in Luxembourg =

- 26 May 2019

All 6 Luxembourgish seats to the European Parliament
	First party	Second party
Party	DP	CSV
Alliance	ALDE	EPP
Last election	1 seat, 14.8%	3 seats, 37.7%
Seats won	2	2
Seat change	▲1	▼1
Popular vote	268,910	264,665
Percentage	21.4%	21.1%
Swing	▲6.6	▼16.6
	Third party	Fourth party
Party	Greens	LSAP
Alliance	European Greens	PES
Last election	1 seat, 15.0%	1 seat, 11.8%
Seats won	1	1
Seat change	Steady	Steady
Popular vote	237,215	152,900
Percentage	18.9%	12.2%
Swing	▲3.9	▲0.4

Elections for the 2019 European Parliament election in Luxembourg were held on 26 May 2019. Ten parties contested the election for Luxembourg's six seats in the European Parliament.

The Democratic Party won the highest percentage of the vote with 21.4 %, making it the first time this party came first in an election in Luxembourg. They were also the first in which the Christian Social People's Party lost to the Democratic Party in Luxembourg-wide elections.

== Electoral system ==
The six representatives to the European Parliament are elected in a single constituency, similar to in elections for the Chamber of Deputies. Each voter could either select a party list or distribute six votes (with up to two to a single candidate), with the final seat tally calculated by a Hagenbach-Bischoff quota.

In addition to Luxembourgish citizens, voting was open to European Union citizens resident in Luxembourg. Voting is compulsory for all eligible enrolled voters who are under 75 years of age.

== Results ==
Party	Votes	%	Seats	+/–
Democratic Party	268,910	21.44	2	+1
Christian Social People's Party	264,665	21.10	2	–1
The Greens	237,215	18.91	1	0
Luxembourg Socialist Workers' Party	152,900	12.19	1	0
Alternative Democratic Reform Party	125,988	10.04	0	0
Pirate Party Luxembourg	96,579	7.70	0	0
The Left	60,648	4.83	0	0
Volt Luxembourg	26,483	2.11	0	New
Communist Party of Luxembourg	14,323	1.14	0	0
The Conservatives	6,652	0.53	0	New
Total	1,254,363	100.00	6	0
Valid votes	217,086	90.44		
Invalid/blank votes	22,958	9.56		
Total votes	240,044	100.00		
Registered voters/turnout	285,435	84.10		
Source: Government of Luxembourg
