= Same-sex marriage in Luxembourg =

Same-sex marriage has been legal in Luxembourg since 1 January 2015. A bill for the legalisation of same-sex marriages was approved 56–4 by the Chamber of Deputies on 18 June 2014 and signed into law by Grand Duke Henri on 4 July. It went into force on 1 January. Polling suggests that a majority of Luxembourgers support the legal recognition of same-sex marriage. Luxembourg was the last Benelux country, the tenth in Europe and the sixteenth in the world to allow same-sex couples to marry nationwide.

Partnerships have also been available in Luxembourg since November 2004.

== Partnerships ==
=== Legislative action ===
On 7 December 1995, Deputy Lydie Err introduced a private member's bill to create free unions (Luxembourgish: fräi Unioun, pronounced [fʀæːɪ̯ uniˈəʊ̯n]; French: union libre, pronounced [ynjɔ̃ libʁ]; German: eheähnliche Gemeinschaft, pronounced [ˈeːəˌʔɛːnlɪçə gəˈmaɪ̯nʃaft]) granting same-sex couples some of the rights and benefits of marriage. Her party, the Luxembourg Socialist Workers' Party (LSAP), was part of the Juncker–Poos Government together with the Christian Social People's Party (CSV). A bill to legalise same-sex marriage was introduced as early as 9 May 1996 by Deputy Renée Wagener of the opposition Greens. Both proposals would not get a Council of State opinion until 13 June 2000.

The Juncker–Polfer Government, a coalition of the CSV and the Democratic Party, drafted a bill establishing partnerships (Luxembourgish: Partnerschaft, pronounced [ˈpɑχtnɐʃɑft]; French: partenariat, pronounced [paʁtənaʁja]; German: Partnerschaft, pronounced [ˈpaʁtnɐʃaft]), approving it in cabinet on 26 April 2002. On 13 January 2004, the Council of State criticised the decision to base the bill on the French civil solidarity pact rather than the Belgian statutory cohabitation, which it considered to be of superior legal quality. The Council also recommended considering the legalisation of same-sex marriage, citing neighbouring Belgium—which had recently taken that step—as an example. The government bill, along with the two earlier proposals, was debated and voted on together on 12 May 2004. The Chamber of Deputies approved the partnership bill by 33 votes to 7 with 20 abstentions. The bill was supported by the two governing parties and opposed by the Alternative Democratic Reform Party (ADR). Those who abstained were members of the LSAP, the Greens, and The Left. The Chamber rejected the proposals to create free unions and to legalise same-sex marriage, with the two governing parties voting against and the opposition parties voting in favour—except for the ADR, which also voted against the same-sex marriage bill.

12 May 2004 vote in the Chamber of Deputies
Party	Voted for	Voted against	Abstained
G Christian Social People's Party	19: Nancy Arendt; Lucien Clement; Marie-Josée Frank; Marcel Glesener; Jean-Marie Halsdorf; Norbert Haupert; Nico Loes; Paul-Henri Meyers; Laurent Mosar; Ferny Nicklaus-Faber; Patrick Santer; Marcel Sauber; Marco Schank; Nelly Stein; Nicolas Strotz; Fred Sunnen; Théo Stendebach; Lucien Weiler; Claude Wiseler	–	1: Jean Spautz
G Democratic Party	14: Simone Beissel; Jeannot Belling; Xavier Bettel; Niki Bettendorf; Emile Calmes; Agnès Durdu; Gusty Graas; Paul Helminger; Alex Krieps; Claude Meisch; Maggy Nagel; Jean-Paul Rippinger; Marco Schroell; John Schummer	–	–
Luxembourg Socialist Workers' Party	–	–	13: Jean Asselborn; Alex Bodry; Mady Delvaux-Stehres; Mars Di Bartolomeo; Lydie Err; Ben Fayot; Jean-Pierre Klein; Jeannot Krecké; Lucien Lux; Lydia Mutsch; Jos Scheuer; Georges Wohlfart; Marc Zanussi
Alternative Democratic Reform Party	–	7: Jean Colombera; Gaston Gibéryen; Fernand Greisen; Jacques-Yves Henckes; Aly Jaerling; Jean-Pierre Koepp; Robert Mehlen	–
The Greens	–	–	5: François Bausch; Camille Gira; Jean Huss; Dagmar Reuter-Angelsberg; Renée Wagener
The Left	–	–	1: Serge Urbany
Total	33	7	20
Total	55.0%	11.7%	33.3%

The partnership law was signed by Grand Duke Henri on 9 July and took effect on 1 November 2004. The partnerships, which are based on the French civil solidarity pact, are available to both same-sex and opposite-sex couples. These partnerships provide many of the rights and obligations of marriage, including welfare benefits and fiscal advantages, but excluding adoption rights.

=== Statistics ===
In 2011, 88.1% of Luxembourg couples were married, 2.7% were in a partnership and 9.1% were cohabiting.

== Same-sex marriage ==
Laws regarding same-sex partnerships in Europe¹ Marriage Civil union Limited domestic recognition (cohabitation) Unrecognized Constitution limits marriage to opposite-sex couples ¹ May include recent laws or court decisions that have not yet entered into effect.

=== Legislative action ===
The ruling Christian Social People's Party until 2009 was opposed to same-sex marriage, even though Prime Minister Jean-Claude Juncker, originating from the same party, had expressed his personal support. In July 2007, a motion calling for the legalisation of same-sex marriage was rejected by Parliament on a 22–38 vote.

In July 2009, the newly formed Juncker–Asselborn Government announced its intention to legalise same-sex marriage. During a debate on 19 January 2010, Minister of Justice François Biltgen announced that a law to legalise same-sex marriage (with the exception of certain adoption rights) would be finalized before the summer vacation break of Parliament. The government approved the bill on 9 July 2010, and submitted to Parliament on 10 August 2010. In May 2012, the bill was re-drafted and a vote was not expected at least until 2013. On 27 November 2012, the Council of State issued a negative opinion on the bill, but urged Parliament to open a debate on the issue if it proceeded with a vote. Some Council members submitted separate opinions in support of the bill. On 6 February 2013, the Parliament's Legal Affairs Committee approved the measure. On 20 February, the committee agreed to support the right to stepchild adoption for same-sex couples, while restricting joint adoption to opposite-sex couples. This position was confirmed on 6 March 2013. However, on 4 June, the Council of State issued a second review, rejecting the compromise to allow stepchild adoption for all couples but restricting joint adoption to opposite-sex couples. On 19 June 2013, the Legal Affairs Committee decided to support full adoption rights for same-sex couples. The bill was expected to be voted on by Parliament in the autumn of 2013; however, a further delay was caused by elections in October 2013 following the resignation of the Juncker–Asselborn Government.

The coalition agreement of the new Bettel–Schneider Government, sworn in on 4 December 2013 and led by gay Prime Minister Xavier Bettel, included marriage and adoption rights for same-sex couples, scheduled for the first trimester of 2014. (Note: Page 12 of the coalition agreement: La réforme sur le droit au mariage pour tous les couples, indépendamment de leur genre ou identité sexuelle sera adoptée au courant du premier trimestre 2014. (translating to "The reform on the right to marriage for all couples, regardless of their gender or sexual identity will be adopted in the first trimester of 2014.")) On 8 January 2014, the Minister of Justice, Félix Braz, stated that Parliament would vote on the bill in the summer of 2014 and, if approved, it would take effect before the end of 2014. On 19 March 2014, the Legal Affairs Committee completed its work on the marriage bill, and sent it to the Council of State, which released its opinion on 20 May 2014. On 28 May, the committee voted to send the bill to the Chamber of Deputies, with every political party except the Alternative Democratic Reform Party (ADR) being in favour. The legislation was approved by the Chamber of Deputies in a 56–4 vote on 18 June 2014. On 24 June, the Council of State agreed to waive a second vote in the Chamber.

18 June 2014 vote in the Chamber of Deputies
Party	Voted for	Voted against	Abstained
Christian Social People's Party	22: Diane Adehm; Sylv Andrich-Duval; Nancy Arendt; Emile Eicher; Félix Eischen; Luc Frieden; Léon Gloden; Jean-Marie Halsdorf; Martine Hansen; Franç Hetto-Gaasch; Jean-Claude Juncker; Marc Lies; Paul-Henri Meyers; Octavie Modert; Laurent Mosar; Marcel Oberweis; Gilles Roth; Marco Schank; Marc Spautz; Serge Wilmes; Claude Wiseler; Michel Wolter	1: Aly Kaes	–
G Democratic Party	13: Guy Arendt; André Bauler; Gilles Baum; Simone Beissel; Eugène Berger; Anne Brasseur; Lex Delles; Joëlle Elvinger; Gusty Graas; Max Hahn; Alexander Krieps; Edy Mertens; Lydie Polfer	–	–
G Luxembourg Socialist Workers' Party	13: Frank Amdt; Marc Angel; Alex Bodry; Taina Bofferding; Tess Burton; Yves Cruehten; Claudia Dall'Agnol; Mars Di Bartolomeo; Georges Engel; Franz Fayot; Claude Haagen; Cécile Hemmen; Roger Negri	–	–
G The Greens	6: Claude Adam; Henri Kox; Josée Lorsché; Viviane Loschetter; Roberto Traversini; Christiane Wickler	–	–
Alternative Democratic Reform Party	–	3: Gast Gibéryen; Fernand Kartheiser; Roy Reding	–
The Left	2: Justin Turpel; Serge Urbany	–	–
Total	56	4	0
Total	93.3%	6.7%	0.0%

The law was promulgated by Grand Duke Henri on 4 July and published in the official gazette on 17 July 2014. It took effect the first day of the sixth month after publication (i.e. 1 January 2015). In addition to providing full adoption rights to same-sex couples, the law allows lesbian couples to access artificial insemination in a relatively similar manner to opposite-sex couples. A notable distinction is that lesbian couples require approval from a psychologist. Although opposite-sex couples are also generally directed to a psychologist, the consultation is not mandatory.

The Luxembourgish Civil Code (Title V, Article 143) was amended to state:

- in Luxembourgish: Zwou Persoune vu verschiddenem Geschlecht oder gläichem Geschlecht kënnen sech bestuede.
- in French: Deux personnes de sexe différent ou de même sexe peuvent contracter mariage.
- in German: Zwei Personen verschiedenen oder gleichen Geschlechts können eine Ehe eingehen.

(Two persons of different sex or of the same sex may contract marriage.)

The first same-sex couple to marry in Luxembourg was Henri Lorenzo Huber and Jean-Paul Olinger in Differdange on 1 January 2015. The marriage ceremony was performed by Mayor Roberto Traversini. On 15 May 2015, Prime Minister Xavier Bettel married his partner Gauthier Destenay in a private ceremony at Luxembourg City Hall. Bettel became the first leader of a European Union member state and just the second serving head of government worldwide (after Iceland's Jóhanna Sigurðardóttir) to marry a person of the same sex. In November 2016, Vice Prime Minister Etienne Schneider confirmed that he and his partner Jérôme Domange had married in a private ceremony sometime in 2016.

In June 2014, the Chamber of Deputies invalidated a petition seeking to repeal the new marriage law. However, a court declared the petition valid on 16 November 2015. The petition, called Schutz fir d'Kand in Luxembourgish ("Protection of the Child"), accompanied with about 4,500 signatures, was then re-presented to the Chamber of Deputies, which rejected it again in November 2016. The organizers of the petition had argued that the same-sex marriage law was "a radical transformation of the family and society" and accused the government of "weakening the family" and children's rights. A proposal by an ADR deputy to organize a referendum on opening marriage and adoption to same-sex couples was also rejected by every other political party in the Chamber of Deputies on 7 July 2015. On 19 November 2015, a bill ensuring recognition of same-sex marriages performed abroad before 1 January 2015 was introduced to Parliament. It was approved by the Chamber of Deputies on 19 April 2016 in a 50–3 vote. The law was promulgated on 23 May, published in the official journal on 1 June, and took effect on 5 June 2016.

=== Royal same-sex weddings ===
Contacted by the newspaper L'essentiel, the Grand Ducal Court of Luxembourg confirmed in October 2021 that members of the Luxembourgish royal family may enter into same-sex marriages without having to forfeit the crown, or lose their royal titles and privileges or their place in the line of succession, though the marriage—like opposite-sex marriages—would require the approval of the Grand Duke or Grand Duchess. This followed similar announcements concerning other European royal families.

=== Statistics ===
In 2015, approximately 120 same-sex marriages took place in Luxembourg, with 49 and 11 occurring in Luxembourg City and Esch-sur-Alzette, the two largest cities in the country. This represented about 7% of all marriages. About 69% of same-sex spouses who married that year were aged above 40 (74% for male couples and 61% for female couples). The National Institute for Statistics and Economic Studies has estimated that around 3.5% of marriages performed every year are to same-sex couples. 47 such marriages were registered in 2023.

=== Religious performance ===
In May 2015, the Protestant Church of Luxembourg voted 94–3 to allow its pastors to bless same-sex marriages. Pastors are under no obligation to bless same-sex marriages if this would violate their personal beliefs. The first blessing occurred a few weeks later. On the other hand, the Catholic Church opposes same-sex marriage and does not allow its priests to officiate at such marriages. In December 2023, the Holy See published Fiducia supplicans, a declaration allowing Catholic priests to bless couples who are not considered to be married according to church teaching, including the blessing of same-sex couples.

== Public opinion ==
The 2006 Eurobarometer poll found that 58% of Luxembourgers supported same-sex marriage. An April 2013 PoliMonitor survey commissioned by the Luxemburger Wort and RTL Télé Lëtzebuerg placed support for same-sex marriage in Luxembourg at 83% and for adoption by same-sex couples at 55%.

The 2015 Eurobarometer found that 75% of Luxembourgers thought same-sex marriage should be allowed throughout Europe, while 20% were opposed. In 2019, the Eurobarometer showed that support had increased to 85%, with 9% opposed. The 2023 Eurobarometer found that 84% of Luxembourgers thought same-sex marriage should be allowed throughout Europe, while 13% were opposed. The survey also found that 86% of Luxembourgers thought that "there is nothing wrong in a sexual relationship between two persons of the same sex", while 13% disagreed.

== See also ==
- LGBT rights in Luxembourg
- Recognition of same-sex unions in Europe
