= Nagel (surname) =

Origin
- Language: German/Dutch
- Meaning: nail

Other names
- Alternative spelling: Nágel

Nagel is a German and Dutch surname. Meaning "nail" in both languages, the surname is metonymic referring to the occupation of a nail maker.

== list of people with the surname ==
Notable people with the surname include:

- Aaron Nagel, American painter and musician
- Alexander Nagel (born 1945), American mathematician
- Anne Nagel (1915–1966), American actress
- Bill Nagel (1915–1981), American baseball player
- Björn Nagel (born 1978), German-Ukrainian equestrian
- Carsten Nagel (born 1955), Danish writer
- Charles Nagel (1849–1940), American politician and lawyer
- Christiaan Nagel (born 1982), South African–born British street artist
- Christian Heinrich von Nagel (1803–1882), German mathematician
- Conrad Nagel (1897–1970), American actor
- David Nagel (born c. 1945), American executive
- De-Wet Nagel (born 1985), South African actor, musician and composer
- Dolf van der Nagel (1889–1949), Dutch footballer
- Ernest Nagel (1901–1985), American philosopher of science
- Georg Nagel (born 1953), German biophysicist
- Gerd Nagel (born 1957), West German high jumper
- Heike Nagel (born 1946), West German swimmer
- Ivan Nagel (1931–2002), German theater scholar, critic and director
- Jan Nagel (born 1939), Dutch politician
- Jan Nagel (painter) (c. 1560 – 1602), Dutch Renaissance painter
- Jennifer Nagel (born 1947), Canadian philosopher
- Judy Nagel (born 1951), American skier
- Juliane Nagel (born 1978), German politician
- Lisle Nagel (1905–1971), Australian cricketer, twin-brother of Vernon
- Maggy Nagel (born 1957), Luxembourgish politician
- Melanie von Nagel (1908–2006), American-German writer and nun
- Mónica Nágel Berger (born 1960), Costa Rican politician and lawyer
- Morné Nagel (born 1978), South African sprinter
- Otto Nagel (1894–1967), German painter
- Patrick Nagel (1945–1984), American artist
- Paul C. Nagel (1926–2011), American historian and biographer
- Ray Nagel (1927–2015), American football coach
- Rodica Nagel (born 1970), French-Romanian long-distance runner
- Rosemarie Nagel (born 1963), German economist
- Richard Nagel (1857–1941), German coffee trader, ornithologist and artist
- Sidney R. Nagel (born 1948), American physicist
- Simon Nagel (born 1985), Danish footballer
- Steven R. Nagel (1946–2014), American astronaut
- Stuart Nagel (1934–2001), American political scientist
- Thomas Nagel (born 1937), American philosopher
- Tilman Nagel (born 1942), German Orientalist
- Vernon Nagel (1905–1974), Australian cricketer, twin-brother of Lisle
- Volbrecht Nagel (1867–1921), German missionary to India

== See also ==
- Nagl
- Nagle
- Magel
