= Nagele (surname) =

Nagele or Nägele is a surname. Notable people with the surname include:

- Edmund Nägele, German photographer
- Elisabeth Nagele (1933–1993), Swiss luger
- Eugen Nägele (born 1964), Liechtenstein politician
- Franz Nägele (1918–2011), Liechtenstein politician
- Gottfried Nägele (1841–1914), German priest and malacologist
- Hans Nägele (1884–1973), Austrian journalist, non-fiction author and folklorist
- Johannes Nagele (born 1964), Austrian fencer
- Julia Nagele (born 1971), American designer and educator
- Lino Nägele (born 1994), Liechtenstein architect and politician
- Olivier Nägele (born 1972), Liechtenstein-born ski mountaineer
- Rainer Nägele (1943–2022), American literary scholar

== Other ==
- Nägele Palace, historical monument in Timișoara, Romania

== See also ==
- Nagle (disambiguation)
- Negele (disambiguation)
- Nagel (disambiguation)
