= Neagle =

Neagle is a surname

== List of people with the surname ==
- Anna Neagle (1904–1986), born Florence Marjorie Robertson, English actress and singer
- Denny Neagle (born 1968), baseball player
- Jack Neagle (1858–1904), baseball player
- James Neagle (1760–1822), British engraver
- Jay Neagle (born 1988), Australian footballer
- John Neagle (1796–1865), American painter
- Lamar Neagle (born 1987), American soccer player
- Lynne Neagle (born 1968), Welsh Labour & Co-operative politician
- Merv Neagle (1958–2012), Australian footballer
- Michael Neagle, American musician, Monk & Neagle

== See also ==
- McGregor Park-Neagle Field or MacGregor Park, park and baseball venue in Houston, home field of the Texas Southern Tigers baseball team
- In re Neagle, 135 U.S. 1 (1890), United States Supreme Court decision concerning bodyguards for Supreme Court Justices
- Eagle
- Gleneagle (disambiguation)
- Nagl
- Nagle
- Neale (disambiguation)
- Naegle
- Naegelen
