= Paul Nagel =

Paul Nagel may refer to:

- Paul C. Nagel (1926–2011), American historian
- Paul Nagel (politician) (1831–1880), Swiss politician and president of the Swiss Council of States, 1876–77
- Paul Nagel (mystic), see Balthasar Walther

== See also ==
- Nagel (surname)
- Paul Nagle (born 1978), Irish rally driver
