= Marie-Josée Frank =

Marie-Josée Meyers-Frank (born 12 April 1952 in Echternach) is a Luxembourgish politician. She has been a member of the Christian Social People's Party (CSV) since 1994.

Frank was a member of the Chamber of Deputies, representing the Est constituency from 1999 to 2013. She was first elected to the Chamber in the 1999 election, edging four votes ahead of Nicolas Strotz to be elected third on the CSV list in the constituency (in which three CSV members were elected). She held this seat for the five-year term, but narrowly lost the third spot to Lucien Clement in the 2004 election, whilst the CSV was unable to add a fourth seat in Est. However, the appointment of Fernand Boden and Octavie Modert to the new government vacated those seats, allowing Frank to sit once more in the Chamber from 3 August 2004, as she has since.

She was Mayor of Betzdorf until 2011, having served in that position since 1 January 2000 and sat on the communal council of Betzdorf since 1 August 1996.

== Footnotes ==
Political offices
Preceded by Rhett Sinner	Mayor of Betzdorf; 2000 –	Incumbent
