= East (Chamber of Deputies of Luxembourg constituency) =

Constituency of the Chamber of Deputies, the national legislature of Luxembourg

- Osten; Est; Osten
- Constituency for the Chamber of Deputies
- Location of East within Luxembourg
- Canton: Echternach; Grevenmacher; Remich
- Population: 77,721 (2024)
- Electorate: 40,246 (2023)
- Area: 525 km^{2} (2018)

Current Constituency
- Created: 1919
- Seats: List: 7 (1984–present); 6 (1945–1984); 7 (1919–1945)
- Deputies: List: Gilles Baum (DP); Carole Hartmann (DP); Max Hengel (CSV); Paulette Lenert (LSAP); Octavie Modert (CSV); Alexandra Schoos (ADR); Stéphanie Weydert (CSV)
- Created from: List: Echternach; Grevenmacher; Remich

East (Luxembourgish: Osten; French: Est; German: Osten) is one of the four multi-member constituencies of the Chamber of Deputies, the national legislature of Luxembourg. The constituency was established in 1919 following the introduction of proportional representation for elections to the Chamber of Deputies. It consists of the cantons of Echternach, Grevenmacher and Remich. The constituency currently elects seven of the 60 members of the Chamber of Deputies using the open party-list proportional representation electoral system. At the 2023 general election it had 40,246 registered electors.

== Electoral system ==
East currently elects seven of the 60 members of the Chamber of Deputies using the open party-list proportional representation electoral system. Electors votes for candidates rather than parties and may cast as many votes as the number of deputies to be elected from the constituency. They may vote for an entire party list or individual candidates and may cast up to two votes for an individual candidate. If the party list contains fewer candidates than the number of deputies to be elected, the elector may vote for candidates from other lists as long as their total number of votes does not exceed the number of deputies to be elected. The ballot paper is invalidated if the elector cast more votes than the number of deputies to be elected from the constituency. Split-ticket voting (panachage) is permitted.

The votes received by each party's candidates are aggregated and seats are allocated to each party using the Hagenbach-Bischoff quota.

== Election results ==
=== Summary ===
Election	Communists KPL / ABP			Left DL / NL / RSP / LCR			Socialist Workers LSAP / LAP / SP			Greens DG / GLEI-GAP / GAP			Democrats DP / GD / GPD			Christian Social People CSV / RP			Alternative Democratic Reform ADR / 5/6		
Election	Votes	%	Seats	Votes	%	Seats	Votes	%	Seats	Votes	%	Seats	Votes	%	Seats	Votes	%	Seats	Votes	%	Seats
2023	898	0.40%	0	5,687	2.52%	0	39,049	17.27%	1	17,282	7.64%	0	51,810	22.91%	2	69,210	30.61%	3	21,404	9.47%	1
2018	1,396	0.66%	0	6,984	3.30%	0	27,222	12.88%	1	34,930	16.52%	1	43,681	20.66%	2	62,156	29.40%	3	20,255	9.58%	0
2013	1,537	0.79%	0	5,941	3.06%	0	28,385	14.60%	1	25,486	13.11%	1	36,237	18.63%	2	71,727	36.89%	3	16,901	8.69%	0
2009	1,708	0.97%	0	3,922	2.24%	0	28,602	16.32%	1	24,766	14.13%	1	26,992	15.40%	1	72,640	41.44%	4	16,661	9.50%	0
2004				2,214	1.32%	0	27,682	16.50%	1	20,363	12.13%	1	31,890	19.00%	1	64,908	38.68%	3	20,754	12.37%	1
1999				2,448	1.63%	0	27,037	17.99%	1	13,047	8.68%	0	36,935	24.58%	2	48,765	32.45%	3	20,358	13.55%	1
1994	867	0.60%	0				33,491	23.15%	2	13,086	9.04%	0	30,750	21.25%	1	47,124	32.57%	3	16,430	11.36%	1
1989	2,075	1.46%	0				37,328	26.35%	2	4,636	3.27%	0	25,899	18.28%	1	47,918	33.82%	3	16,182	11.42%	1
1984	2,844	2.08%	0				35,224	25.74%	2				37,501	27.40%	2	57,989	42.37%	3			
1979	1,735	1.54%	0				18,214	16.14%	1				27,009	23.94%	2	48,552	43.03%	3			
1974	3,154	2.83%	0				19,311	17.35%	1				29,296	26.32%	2	40,758	36.61%	2			
1968	5,018	5.09%	0				22,400	22.70%	1				23,584	23.90%	2	46,959	47.59%	3			
1964	3,100	3.05%	0				25,449	25.07%	2				19,749	19.45%	1	47,068	46.36%	3			
1959							23,560	21.64%	1				31,302	28.75%	2	54,031	49.62%	3			
1954	1,844	1.64%	0				23,077	20.52%	1				24,529	21.82%	1	62,987	56.02%	4			
1948	2,636	2.47%	0				21,888	20.54%	1				28,324	26.59%	2	53,690	50.40%	3			
1945	2,503	2.27%	0				7,988	7.26%	0				21,535	19.57%	1	64,045	58.20%	4			
1934																77,560	60.47%	4			
1928																77,636	63.35%	5			
1925																69,322	57.94%	5			
1919																90,252	75.15%	6			

=== Detailed ===
==== 2020s ====
===== 2023 =====
Results of the 2023 general election held on 8 October 2023:

Party		Votes	%	Seats
Christian Social People's Party	CSV	69,210	30.61%	3
Democratic Party	DP	51,810	22.91%	2
Luxembourg Socialist Workers' Party	LSAP	39,049	17.27%	1
Alternative Democratic Reform Party	ADR	21,404	9.47%	1
The Greens	DG	17,282	7.64%	0
Pirate Party Luxembourg	PPLU	11,071	4.90%	0
The Left	DL	5,687	2.52%	0
Focus	FOK	5,685	2.51%	0
Liberty – Freedom!	LF	3,457	1.53%	0
Communist Party of Luxembourg	KPL	898	0.40%	0
Volt Luxembourg	VOLT	554	0.25%	0
Total		226,107	100.00%	7
Valid votes		33,484		
Blank votes		898	2.52%	
Rejected votes – other		1,227	3.45%	
Total polled		35,609	88.48%	
Registered electors		40,246		

The following candidates were elected: Lex Delles (DP), 13,041 votes; Léon Gloden (CSV), 13,375 votes; Carole Hartmann (DP), 10,546 votes; Max Hengel (CSV), 11,942 votes; Paulette Lenert (LSAP), 14,339 votes; Octavie Modert (CSV), 10,208 votes; and Alexandra Schoos (LSAP), 4,293 votes.

==== 2010s ====
===== 2018 =====
Results of the 2018 general election held on 14 October 2018:

Party		Votes	%	Seats
Christian Social People's Party	CSV	62,156	29.40%	3
Democratic Party	DP	43,677	20.66%	2
The Greens	DG	34,930	16.52%	1
Luxembourg Socialist Workers' Party	LSAP	27,222	12.88%	1
Alternative Democratic Reform Party	ADR	20,255	9.58%	0
Pirate Party Luxembourg	PPLU	14,761	6.98%	0
The Left	DL	6,984	3.30%	0
Communist Party of Luxembourg	KPL	1,396	0.66%	0
Total		211,381	100.00%	7
Valid votes		31,351		
Blank votes		817	2.45%	
Rejected votes – other		1,148	3.45%	
Total polled		33,316	91.04%	
Registered electors		36,595		

The following candidates were elected: Gilles Baum (DP), 7,299 votes; Lex Delles (DP), 10,396 votes; Carole Dieschbourg (DG), 9,752 votes; Léon Gloden (CSV), 9,754 votes; Françoise Hetto (CSV), 12,150 votes; Octavie Modert (CSV), 10,222 votes; and Nicolas Schmit (LSAP), 5,522 votes.

===== 2013 =====
Results of the 2013 general election held on 20 October 2013:

Party		Votes	%	Seats
Christian Social People's Party	CSV	71,727	36.89%	3
Democratic Party	DP	36,237	18.63%	2
Luxembourg Socialist Workers' Party	LSAP	28,385	14.60%	1
The Greens	DG	25,486	13.11%	1
Alternative Democratic Reform Party	ADR	16,901	8.69%	0
The Left	DL	5,941	3.06%	0
Pirate Party Luxembourg	PPLU	5,226	2.69%	0
Party for Full Democracy	PID	3,018	1.55%	0
Communist Party of Luxembourg	KPL	1,537	0.79%	0
Total		194,458	100.00%	7
Valid votes		28,907		
Blank votes		947	3.06%	
Rejected votes – other		1,057	3.42%	
Total polled		30,911	91.34%	
Registered electors		33,841		

The following candidates were elected: Lex Delles (DP), 5,338 votes; Léon Gloden (CSV), 10,612 votes; Françoise Hetto (CSV), 14,281 votes; Henri Kox (DG), 6,271 votes; Octavie Modert (CSV), 11,485 votes; Maggy Nagel (DP), 7,103 votes; and Nicolas Schmit (LSAP), 5,070 votes.

==== 2000s ====
===== 2009 =====
Results of the 2009 general election held on 7 June 2009:

Party		Votes	%	Seats
Christian Social People's Party	CSV	72,640	41.44%	4
Luxembourg Socialist Workers' Party	LSAP	28,602	16.32%	1
Democratic Party	DP	26,992	15.40%	1
The Greens	DG	24,766	14.13%	1
Alternative Democratic Reform Party	ADR	16,661	9.50%	0
The Left	DL	3,922	2.24%	0
Communist Party of Luxembourg	KPL	1,708	0.97%	0
Total		175,291	100.00%	7
Valid votes		26,461		
Blank votes		992	3.51%	
Rejected votes – other		784	2.78%	
Total polled		28,237	91.64%	
Registered electors		30,814		

The following candidates were elected: Fernand Boden (CSV), 11,629 votes; Marie-Josée Frank (CSV), 11,534 votes; Françoise Hetto (CSV), 11,776 votes; Henri Kox (DG), 7,551 votes; Octavie Modert (CSV), 12,728 votes; Nicolas Schmit (LSAP), 7,653 votes; and Carlo Wagner (DP), 5,787 votes.

===== 2004 =====
Results of the 2004 general election held on 13 June 2004:

Party		Votes	%	Seats
Christian Social People's Party	CSV	64,908	38.68%	3
Democratic Party	DP	31,890	19.00%	1
Luxembourg Socialist Workers' Party	LSAP	27,682	16.50%	1
Alternative Democratic Reform Party	ADR	20,754	12.37%	1
The Greens	DG	20,363	12.13%	1
The Left	DL	2,214	1.32%	0
Total		167,811	100.00%	7
Valid votes		25,024		
Blank votes		731	2.77%	
Rejected votes – other		611	2.32%	
Total polled		26,366	92.23%	
Registered electors		28,588		

The following candidates were elected: Fernand Boden (CSV), 13,652 votes; Lucien Clement (CSV), 9,045 votes; Henri Kox (DG), 4,972 votes; Robert Mehlen (ADR), 5,528 votes; Octavie Modert (CSV), 9,064 votes; Jos Scheuer (LSAP), 6,453 votes; and Carlo Wagner (DP), 7,999 votes.

==== 1990s ====
===== 1999 =====
Results of the 1999 general election held on 13 June 1999:

Party		Votes	%	Seats
Christian Social People's Party	CSV	48,765	32.45%	3
Democratic Party	DP	36,935	24.58%	2
Luxembourg Socialist Workers' Party	LSAP	27,037	17.99%	1
Action Committee for Democracy and Pensions Justice	ADR	20,358	13.55%	1
The Greens	DG	13,047	8.68%	0
The Left	DL	2,448	1.63%	0
Green and Liberal Alliance	GaL	1,680	1.12%	0
Total		150,270	100.00%	7
Valid votes		22,690		
Blank votes		907	3.74%	
Rejected votes – other		625	2.58%	
Total polled		24,222	85.88%	
Registered electors		28,203		

The following candidates were elected: Fernand Boden (CSV), 9,492 votes; Lucien Clement (CSV), 7,234 votes; Marie-Josée Frank (CSV), 6,630 votes; Robert Mehlen (ADR), 5,692 votes; Maggy Nagel (DP), 5,535 votes; Jos Scheuer (LSAP), 5,501 votes; and Carlo Wagner (DP), 6,454 votes.

===== 1994 =====
Results of the 1994 general election held on 12 June 1994:

Party		Votes	%	Seats
Christian Social People's Party	CSV	47,124	32.57%	3
Luxembourg Socialist Workers' Party	LSAP	33,491	23.15%	2
Democratic Party	DP	30,750	21.25%	1
Action Committee for Democracy and Pensions Justice	ADR	16,430	11.36%	1
The Greens	GLEI-GAP	13,086	9.04%	0
National Movement	NB	2,938	2.03%	0
Communist Party of Luxembourg	KPL	867	0.60%	0
Total		144,686	100.00%	7
Valid votes		21,906		
Blank votes		787	3.39%	
Rejected votes – other		548	2.36%	
Total polled		23,241	87.47%	
Registered electors		26,570		

The following candidates were elected: Fernand Boden (CSV), 9,441 votes; Norbert Konter (CSV), 7,977 votes; Robert Mehlen (ADR), 4,641 votes; Jos Scheuer (LSAP), 6,568 votes; Marcel Schlechter (LSAP), 7,039 votes; Nicolas Strotz (CSV), 7,025 votes; and Carlo Wagner (DP), 5,538 votes.

==== 1980s ====
===== 1989 =====
Results of the 1989 general election held on 18 June 1989:

Party		Votes	%	Seats
Christian Social People's Party	CSV	47,918	33.82%	3
Luxembourg Socialist Workers' Party	LSAP	37,328	26.35%	2
Democratic Party	DP	25,899	18.28%	1
Action Committee 5/6 Pensions for Everyone	5/6	16,182	11.42%	1
Green Alternative Party	GAP	4,636	3.27%	0
Green List Ecological Initiative	GLEI	4,176	2.95%	0
National Movement	NB	2,606	1.84%	0
Communist Party of Luxembourg	KPL	2,075	1.46%	0
Green Alternative Alliance	GRAL	849	0.60%	0
Total		141,669	100.00%	7
Valid votes		21,321		
Blank votes		581	2.58%	
Rejected votes – other		634	2.81%	
Total polled		22,536	87.46%	
Registered electors		25,766		

The following candidates were elected: Fernand Boden (CSV), 9,817 votes; Robert Gitzinger (DP), 4,507 votes; Fernand Kons (CSV), 6,882 votes; Norbert Konter (CSV), 7,061 votes; Robert Mehlen (5/6), 3,452 votes; Jos Scheuer (LSAP), 7,091 votes; and Marcel Schlechter (LSAP), 7,822 votes.

===== 1984 =====
Results of the 1984 general election held on 17 June 1984:

Party		Votes	%	Seats
Christian Social People's Party	CSV	57,989	42.37%	3
Democratic Party	DP	37,501	27.40%	2
Luxembourg Socialist Workers' Party	LSAP	35,224	25.74%	2
Independent Socialist Party	PSI	3,294	2.41%	0
Communist Party of Luxembourg	KPL	2,844	2.08%	0
Total		136,852	100.00%	7
Valid votes		20,921		
Blank votes		770	3.47%	
Rejected votes – other		514	2.31%	
Total polled		22,205	87.71%	
Registered electors		25,316		

The following candidates were elected: Fernand Boden (CSV), 12,931 votes; Victor Braun (DP), 6,284 votes; Paul Helminger (DP), 7,914 votes; Marcel Schlechter (LSAP), 6,880 votes; Aly Schroeder (LSAP), 5,771 votes; Jean-Pierre Urwald (CSV), 8,017 votes; and Paul Wagener (CSV), 8,038 votes.

==== 1970s ====
===== 1979 =====
Results of the 1979 general election held on 10 June 1979:

Party		Votes	%	Seats
Christian Social People's Party	CSV	48,552	43.03%	3
Democratic Party	DP	27,009	23.94%	2
Luxembourg Socialist Workers' Party	LSAP	18,214	16.14%	1
Social Democratic Party	SDP	8,275	7.33%	0
Enrôlés de Force	EDF	8,099	7.18%	0
Communist Party of Luxembourg	KPL	1,735	1.54%	0
Alternative List - Worth it		940	0.83%	0
Total		112,824	100.00%	6
Valid votes		19,602		
Blank votes		629	2.96%	
Rejected votes – other		1,039	4.88%	
Total polled		21,270	87.65%	
Registered electors		24,268		

The following candidates were elected: Fernand Boden (CSV), 10,938 votes; Victor Braun (DP), 5,141 votes; Marcel Schlechter (LSAP), 3,949 votes; Jean-Pierre Urwald (CSV), 8,931 votes; Paul Wagener (CSV), 7,502 votes; and Charles Wagner (DP), 5,360 votes.

===== 1974 =====
Results of the 1974 general election held on 26 May 1974:

Party		Votes	%	Seats
Christian Social People's Party	CSV	40,758	36.61%	2
Democratic Party	DP	29,296	26.32%	2
Luxembourg Socialist Workers' Party	LSAP	19,311	17.35%	1
Social Democratic Party	SDP	18,807	16.89%	1
Communist Party of Luxembourg	KPL	3,154	2.83%	0
Total		111,326	100.00%	6
Valid votes		19,449		
Blank votes		317	1.54%	
Rejected votes – other		878	4.25%	
Total polled		20,644	89.16%	
Registered electors		23,153		

The following candidates were elected: Jean-Pierre Büchler (CSV), 8,137 votes; Georges Hurt (SDP), 5,205 votes; Robert Schaffner (DP), 6,582 votes; Marcel Schlechter (LSAP), 3,880 votes; Jean-Pierre Urwald (CSV), 8,436 votes; and Charles Wagner (DP), 6,505 votes.

==== 1960s ====
===== 1968 =====
Results of the 1968 general election held on 15 December 1968:

Party		Votes	%	Seats
Christian Social People's Party	CSV	46,959	47.59%	3
Democratic Party	DP	23,584	23.90%	2
Luxembourg Socialist Workers' Party	LSAP	22,400	22.70%	1
Communist Party of Luxembourg	KPL	5,018	5.09%	0
National Solidarity		705	0.71%	0
Total		98,666	100.00%	6
Valid votes		17,355		
Blank votes		466	2.51%	
Rejected votes – other		717	3.87%	
Total polled		18,538	86.60%	
Registered electors		21,407		

The following candidates were elected: Jean-Pierre Büchler (CSV), 9,409 votes; Aloyse Duhr (CSV), 8,153 votes; Georges Hurt (LSAP), 5,238 votes; Fernand Kons (CSV), 8,723 votes; Robert Schaffner (DP), 5,716 votes; and Charles Wagner (DP), 5,348 votes.

===== 1964 =====
Results of the 1964 general election held on 7 June 1964:

Party		Votes	%	Seats
Christian Social People's Party	CSV	47,068	46.36%	3
Luxembourg Socialist Workers' Party	LSAP	25,449	25.07%	2
Democratic Party	DP	19,749	19.45%	1
Popular Independent Movement	MIP	6,162	6.07%	0
Communist Party of Luxembourg	KPL	3,100	3.05%	0
Total		101,528	100.00%	6
Valid votes		17,929		
Blank votes		443	2.31%	
Rejected votes – other		820	4.27%	
Total polled		19,192	89.88%	
Registered electors		21,353		

The following candidates were elected: Victor Bodson (LSAP), 5,195 votes; Aloyse Duhr (CSV), 9,001 votes; Georges Hurt (LSAP), 5,288 votes; Fernand Kons (CSV), 8,490 votes; Robert Schaffner (DP), 4,830 votes; and Émile Schaus (CSV), 8,251 votes.

==== 1950s ====
===== 1959 =====
Results of the 1959 general election held on 1 February 1959:

Party		Votes	%	Seats
Christian Social People's Party	CSV	54,031	49.62%	3
Democratic Party	DP	31,302	28.75%	2
Luxembourg Socialist Workers' Party	LSAP	23,560	21.64%	1
Total		108,893	100.00%	6
Valid votes		18,913		
Rejected votes		990	4.97%	
Total polled		19,903	90.88%	
Registered electors		21,901		

The following candidates were elected: Joseph Bech (CSV), 11,676 votes; Othon Decker (LSAP), 4,916 votes; Aloyse Duhr (CSV), 9,055 votes; Robert Schaffner (DP), 7,911 votes; Guillaume Speck (CSV), 8,752 votes; and Charles Wagner (DP), 6,984 votes.

===== 1954 =====
Results of the 1954 general election held on 30 May 1954:

Party		Votes	%	Seats
Christian Social People's Party	CSV	62,987	56.02%	4
Democratic Group	GD	24,529	21.82%	1
Luxembourg Socialist Workers' Party	LSAP	23,077	20.52%	1
Communist Party of Luxembourg	KPL	1,844	1.64%	0
Total		112,437	100.00%	6
Valid votes		19,480		
Rejected votes		1,043	5.08%	
Total polled		20,523	91.88%	
Registered electors		22,336		

The following candidates were elected: Joseph Bech (CSV), 14,038 votes; Othon Decker (LSAP), 5,156 votes; Aloyse Duhr (CSV), 9,925 votes; Robert Schaffner (GD), 5,757 votes; Guillaume Speck (CSV), 10,036 votes; and Nicolas Thill (CSV), 10,518 votes.

==== 1940s ====
===== 1948 =====
Results of the 1948 general election held on 6 June 1948:

Party		Votes	%	Seats
Christian Social People's Party	CSV	53,690	50.40%	3
Patriotic and Democratic Group	GPD	28,324	26.59%	2
Luxembourg Socialist Workers' Party	LSAP	21,888	20.54%	1
Communist Party of Luxembourg	KPL	2,636	2.47%	0
Total		106,538	100.00%	6
Valid votes		18,568		
Blank votes		0	0.00%	
Rejected votes – other		1,245	6.28%	
Total polled		19,813	93.12%	
Registered electors		21,276		

The following candidates were elected: Joseph Bech (CSV), 12,203 votes; Othon Decker (LSAP), 6,027 votes; Nicolas Leonardy (CSV), 8,514 votes; Robert Schaffner (GPD), 10,232 votes; Guillaume Speck (CSV), 9,309 votes; and Charles Wagner (GPD), 4,920 votes.

===== 1945 =====
Results of the 1945 general election held on 21 October 1945:

Party		Votes	%	Seats
Christian Social People's Party	CSV	64,045	58.20%	4
Patriotic and Democratic Group	GPD	21,535	19.57%	1
Party of Independents of the East	OO	13,977	12.70%	1
Luxembourg Workers' Party	LAP	7,988	7.26%	0
Communist Party of Luxembourg	KPL	2,503	2.27%	0
Total		110,048	100.00%	6
Valid votes		19,011		
Blank votes		124	0.63%	
Rejected votes – other		670	3.38%	
Total polled		19,805		
Registered electors				

The following candidates were elected: Joseph Bech (CSV), 15,064 votes; Othon Decker (OO), 6,027 votes; Aloyse Duhr (CSV), 9,736 votes; Robert Schaffner (GPD), 6,077 votes; Guillaume Speck (CSV), 11,077 votes; and Nicolas Thill (CSV), 10,127 votes.

==== 1930s ====
===== 1934 =====
Results of the 1934 general election held on 3 June 1934:

Party		Votes	%	Seats
Party of the Right	RP	77,560	60.47%	4
Party of Independents of the East	OL	50,707	39.53%	3
Total		128,267	100.00%	7
Valid votes		19,370		
Blank votes		221	1.10%	
Rejected votes – other		540	2.68%	
Total polled		20,131		
Registered electors				

The following candidates were elected: Joseph Bech (RP), 15,211 votes; Othon Decker (OL), 10,149 votes; Jean-Baptiste Didier (RP), 10,441 votes; Pierre Godart (OL), 10,020 votes; Auguste Keiffer (OL), 10,064 votes; Adolphe Klein (RP), 11,101 votes; and Mathias Schaffner (RP), 10,629 votes.

==== 1920s ====
===== 1928 =====
Results of the 1928 general election held on 3 June 1928:

Party		Votes	%	Seats
Party of the Right	RP	77,636	63.35%	5
Independent Left	OL	36,773	30.01%	2
Independent Group	OG	8,137	6.64%	0
Total		122,546	100.00%	7
Valid votes		18,457		
Blank votes		174	0.90%	
Rejected votes – other		704	3.64%	
Total polled		19,335		
Registered electors				

The following candidates were elected: Joseph Bech (RP), 16,222 votes; Jean-Baptiste Didier (RP), 10,806 votes; Pierre Godart (OL), 7,838 votes; Auguste Keiffer (OL), 7,732 votes; Adolphe Klein (RP), 11,588 votes; Mathias Schaffner (RP), 10,280 votes; and Jean-Pierre Wiltzius (RP), 10,152 votes.

===== 1925 =====
Results of the 1925 general election held on 1 March 1925:

Party		Votes	%	Seats
Party of the Right	RP	69,322	57.94%	5
Independent Left	OL	39,700	33.18%	2
National Independent Union	ONV	10,625	8.88%	0
Total		119,647	100.00%	7
Valid votes		17,632		
Blank votes		117	0.64%	
Rejected votes – other		521	2.85%	
Total polled		18,270		
Registered electors				

The following candidates were elected: Joseph Bech (RP), 12,316 votes; Othon Decker (OL), 7,761 votes; Jean-Baptiste Didier (RP), 10,030 votes; Pierre Godart (OL), 8,585 votes; Mathias Huss (RP), 9,983 votes; Adolphe Klein (RP), 10,758 votes; and Jean-Pierre Wiltzius (RP), 9,322 votes.

==== 1910s ====
===== 1919 =====
Results of the 1919 general election held on 26 October 1919:

Party		Votes	%	Seats
Party of the Right	RP	90,252	75.15%	6
Cartel	K	22,057	18.37%	1
Independent People's Party	FV	7,790	6.49%	0
Total		120,099	100.00%	7
Valid votes		18,075		
Rejected votes		999	5.24%	
Total polled		19,074		
Registered electors				

The following candidates were elected: Joseph Bech (RP), 13,369 votes; Othon Decker (K), 4,900 votes; Lamoral de Villers (RP), 12,348 votes; Albert Dühr (RP), 13,215 votes; Mathias Huss (RP), 12,929 votes; Adolphe Klein (RP), 12,703 votes; and Auguste Thorn (RP), 13,564 votes.
