= Nagle (disambiguation) =

Nagle is a surname. It may also refer to:

- Nagle, Missouri, United States, a ghost town
- Nagle Dam, on the Mgeni River, KwaZulu-Natal, South Africa
- Nagle College, an independent Roman Catholic co-educational secondary day school in Bairnsdale, Victoria, Australia
- Nagle Catholic College, an independent Roman Catholic co-educational secondary day school in Geraldton, Western Australia, Australia
- Nagle baronets, an extinct title in the Baronetage of the United Kingdom

== See also ==
- Nagle's algorithm, in computing a way of deciding when to send data
- Nagel (disambiguation)
