= Naegle =

Naegle is a surname. It is similar to Neagle.

== List of people with the surname ==
- Stephen Howard Naegle (born 1938), American painter
- Sue Naegle, American business executive
- Walter Naegle (born 1949), American civil rights and LGBT activist

=== Fictional characters ===
- Lindsay Naegle, in The Simpsons

== See also ==
- Naegelen
