= Carole Hartmann =

Luxembourgish politician (born 1987)

The Honourable Carole Hartmann
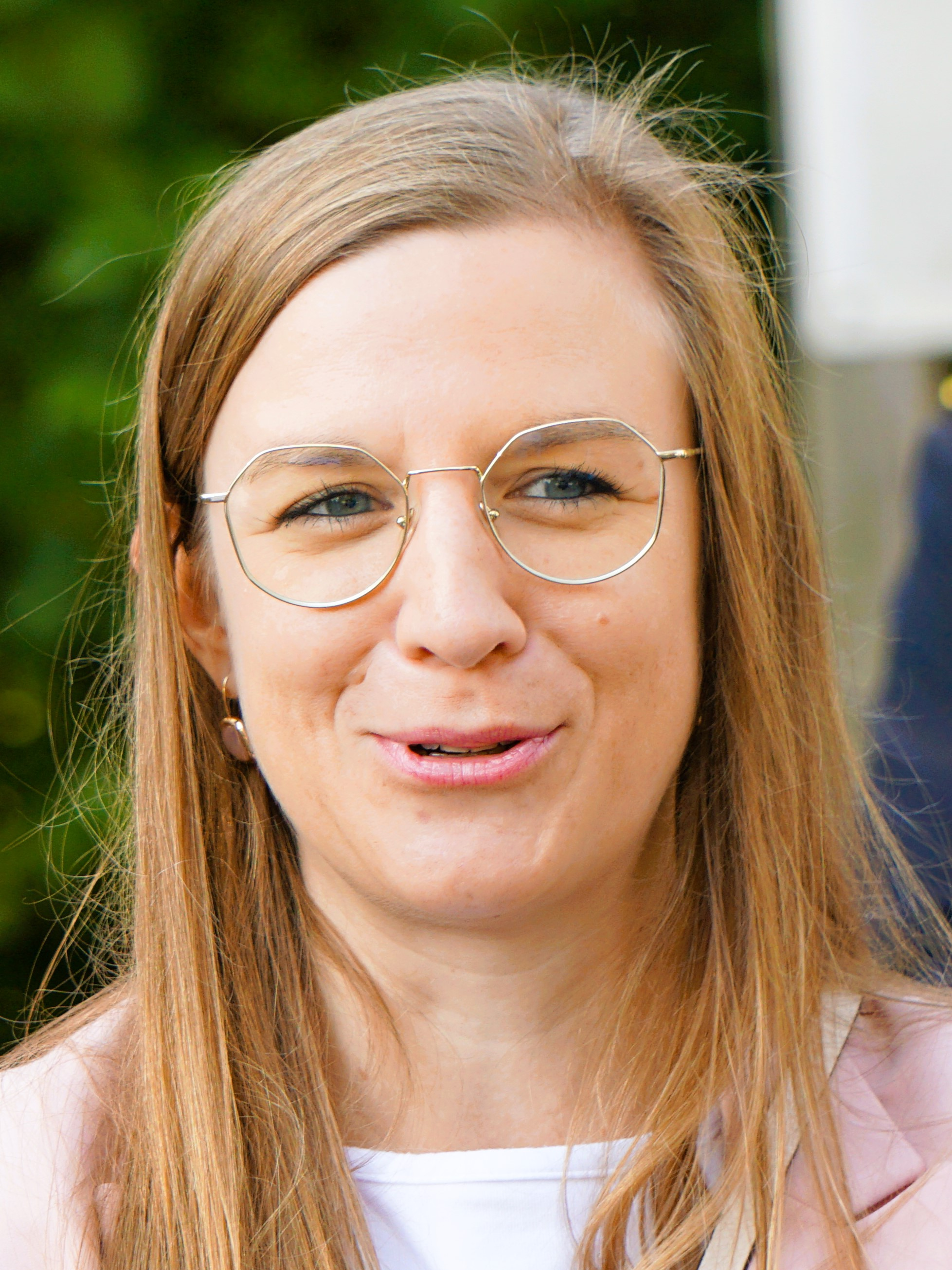

President of the Democratic Party
- Incumbent
- Assumed office 27 April 2025
- Preceded by: Lex Delles

Member of the Chamber of Deputies
- Incumbent
- Assumed office 6 December 2018
- Preceded by: Lex Delles
- Constituency: East

Personal details
- Born: 3 June 1987 (age 38)
- Party: Democratic Party

Carole Hartmann (born 3 June 1987) is a Luxembourgish politician of the Democratic Party serving as a member of the Chamber of Deputies. She first took office in 2018, succeeding Lex Delles, and was re-elected in the 2023 general election. Since 2023, she has served as mayor of Echternach. She was previously a table tennis player for the women's national team.
