= Juncker–Polfer Government =

Juncker-Polfer Government
- Cabinet of Luxembourg
- 1999-2004
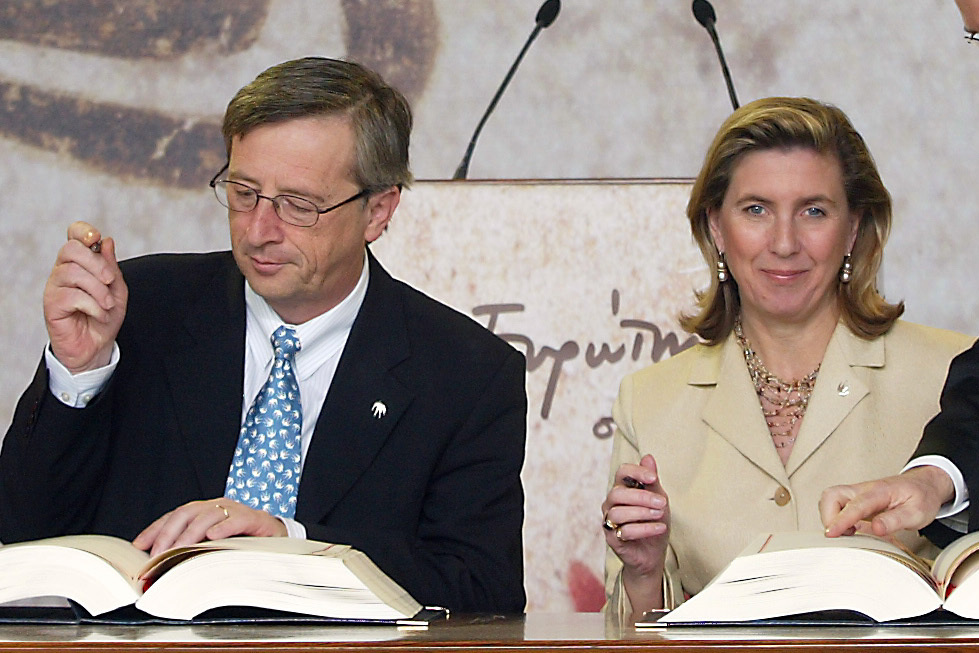
- Date formed: 7 August 1999
- Date dissolved: 31 July 2004 (4 years, 11 months, 3 weeks and 3 days)

People and organisations
- Grand Duke: Jean (1999-2000); Henri (2000-2004)
- Prime Minister: Jean-Claude Juncker
- Deputy Prime Minister: Lydie Polfer
- Total no. of members: 14
- Member parties: CSV; DP
- Status in legislature: Centre to centre-right coalition government
- Opposition parties: LSAP; ADR; Greens; The Left
- Opposition leader: Jeannot Krecké (Note: De facto leader of the opposition as the leader of the largest opposition group in the Chamber of Deputes.)

History
- Election: 1999 general election
- Legislature term: 30th Legislature of the Chamber of Deputies
- Predecessor: Juncker–Poos Government
- Successor: Juncker–Asselborn I Government

The Juncker–Polfer Government was the government of Luxembourg between 7 August 1999 and 31 July 2004. It was led by, and named after, Prime Minister Jean-Claude Juncker and Deputy Prime Minister Lydie Polfer.

The Juncker-Polfer government represented a coalition between Juncker's Christian Social People's Party (CSV) and Polfer's Democratic Party, which had been elected the largest and second-largest parties respectively in the general election of 1999.

Until 1999, the CSV had been in coalition with the Luxembourg Socialist Workers' Party (LSAP). The Juncker-Polfer government came to an end with the general election of 2004, after which the LSAP once again joined the CSV in coalition and the Democratic Party returned to opposition.

== Ministers ==
Name	Portrait	Party	Office
Jean-Claude Juncker		CSV	Prime Minister; Minister for Finances
Lydie Polfer		DP	Deputy Prime Minister; Minister for Foreign Affairs and Foreign Trade of Luxembourg; Minister for the Civil Service and Administrative Reform
Fernand Boden		CSV	Minister for Agriculture, Viticulture, and Rural Development; Minister for the Middle Class, Tourism, and Housing
Marie-Josée Jacobs		CSV	Minister for the Family, Social Solidarity, and Youth; Minister for Women's Rights
Erna Hennicot-Schoepges		CSV	Minister for Culture, Higher Education, and Research; Minister for Public Works
Michel Wolter		CSV	Minister for the Interior
Luc Frieden		CSV	Minister for Justice; Minister for the Treasury and the Budget
Anne Brasseur		DP	Minister for National Education, Vocational Training, and Sport
Henri Grethen		DP	Minister for the Economy; Minister for Transport
Charles Goerens		DP	Minister for Cooperation and Humanitarian Affairs; Minister for Defence; Minister for the Environment
Carlo Wagner		DP	Minister for Health; Minister for Social Security
François Biltgen		CSV	Minister for Work and Employment; Minister for Relations with Parliament; Minister for Religion; Minister-Delegate for Communications
Joseph Schaack		DP	Secretary of State for the Civil Service and Administrative Reform
Eugène Berger		DP	Secretary of State for the Environment

== Formation ==
At the election of 13 June 1999, the two parties which had governed the country since 1984 suffered significant losses. The CSV now had 19 seats in the Chamber, down from 21 in 1994, while the LSAP received 13 seats, down from 17. The Democratic Party managed to increase its number of Deputies to 15, up from 12 in 1994.

The elections confirmed the growth of small parties at the expense of the three largest parties (CSV, DP and LSAP. The Aktiounskomitee fir Demokratie a Rentegerechtegkeet received 7 seats, the Greens (Déi Gréng) received 5, and The Left (Déi Lénk) received one.

The Grand Duke charged the Prime Minister, Jean-Claude Juncker, with forming a new government. Coalition negotiations were started between the CSV and the DP. On 7 August 1999 the new CSV-DP government was sworn in.

== Foreign policy ==
=== European Union ===
The old and new EU member states as of 2004

==== Enlargement and reform ====
European questions continued to dominate Luxembourg's foreign policy. The period from 1999 to 2004 was devoted to enlargement of the European Union and institutional reforms that went with it. On 16 April 2003 in Athens, 10 new member states (Estonia, Hungary, Lithuania, Latvia, Poland, Slovakia, Slovenia, the Czech Republic, Cyprus and Malta) signed the treaty of accession. Their admission came into force on 1 May 2004. The European Union now counted 455 million residents. This evolution confirmed the government's conviction that despite its small size, Luxembourg had to make all the more efforts to impose its presence on the international scene as the European Union grew.

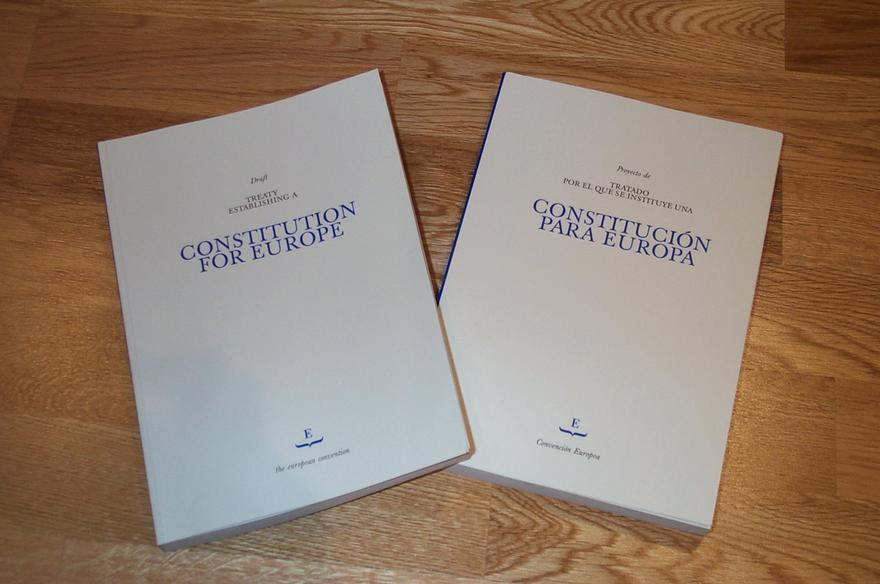
The proposed European Constitution

Luxembourgish diplomacy intensified its work not only in the old member states, but also in the new member states. Luxembourg supported an EU policy aimed at reinforcing the European institutions and their decision-making capacities. Luxembourgish representatives participated in the Convention on the future of the European Union which resulted in the proposed Constitution for Europe. From 27 June 2003, the government took the decision to proceed with the ratification of the future European Constitution – once signed by the 25 heads of state or government – by a national referendum. But at the same time, Luxembourg did not intend to surrender important rights such as the right to a Commissioner, the right to the presidency of the Council of Ministers and an adequate representation in the European Parliament. While it did not deny the necessity for a weighting by population size, it defended the principle of equality between member states. At the Council of Nice, in December 2000, the Union came to an agreement which was also satisfactory for Luxembourg. The Treaty of Nice, signed on 26 February 2001, maintained one Commissioner per member state. Following the new distribution of votes, Luxembourg now had four votes in the Council of Ministers and continued to send six members to the European Parliament.

At the European Council of 17 to 18 June 2004, the 25 EU member states managed to find agreement on the Treaty establishing a Constitution for the European Union. This agreement made Europe more efficient and transparent, reducing the number of decision-making instruments in European institutions, and more democratic through an increase in the powers of the European Parliament. At the same time, the new text respected the equality between member states, while consecrating the principle of demographic difference. Finally, the constitutional treaty allowed Luxembourg to retain its six European Parliament members.

==== Banking and taxation ====
The question of tax harmonisation touched on a vital interest of the Grand Duchy. Wealth management remained the principal activity of the financial centre, even though other sectors such as management of investment funds were developing. However, considerations of confidentiality constituted the life of private banking. In negotiations on the European level, the Luxembourgish government demanded the maintenance of banking secrecy as long as its principal financial-service competitors maintained it as well. But this confidentiality should not be used for criminal activities. This was why the previous government had put through anti-money laundering legislation. The Juncker-Polfer government extended these measures to improve the effectiveness of the fight against fraud and economic and financial crime. In terms of tax harmonisation, the European summit of Feira in June 2000 was a way towards a compromise. An action plan with a deadline of 2010 was agreed. In January 2003 in Brussels. in an "Economic and Financial affairs" council meeting, the European Ministers for Finances and the Economy finally reached an agreement on the taxation of revenue from savings. The agreement stipulated that EU member states could choose between two models: information exchanges between tax administrations, or the introduction of a withholding tax with a progressive increase in the rate of revenue which, after a transition period, would reach 35% from 1 January 2011. The move to the generalised automatic exchange of information was coupled to a similar action by third-party countries, including Switzerland.

=== Development aid ===
The government had given itself the objective of guaranteeing "the future of a small country in a growing Europe, in an increasingly complicated world". But it was in the framework of development aid that Luxembourg was probably best able to affirm its role on the international scene. Overseas aid, which in previous governments had been under a secretary of state, was now under a fully-fledged minister. Public development aid, which had increased constantly, reached 0,8% of gross national income in 2003. With this number, Luxembourg was in 4th place globally. The Luxembourgish effort was now concentrated geographically on a certain number of target countries, and content-wise, on eradicating poverty, social structures, education, health, and equality of opportunities between men and women.

=== Asylum-seekers ===
As in the past, the vagaries of the international situation translated themselves into migration movements, which also affected Luxembourg. Especially from 2002, there was increased number of asylum-seekers, which led the government to adapt legislation. The objective was to speed up the procedure, while respecting human rights as well as related international agreements and treaties. In the course of the period 1999-2004, the government several times undertook a forced return of rejected asylum-seekers.

== Domestic policy ==
=== Economy ===
While the Luxembourgish economy showed very high growth rates in 1999 and 2000, only outperformed by Ireland, the economic situation changed sharply in 2001. GDP growth fell by 5 percentage points to less than 2,5%. At the same time, the unemployment rate, which had been under 3%, grew to 4,3% by 2003. The economic slow-down brought a decrease of tax receipts, which the government could however compensate by using budget reserves. The fiscal reforms of 2001 and 2002 concerning individuals and businesses turned out to be useful, as they contributed to maintaining domestic demand at a relatively stable level, despite economic disturbances.

=== Public investments ===
Despite the difficult economic context, the government maintained significant public investments. The European enlargement led the Luxembourgish state to invest heavily in the improvement and extension of the EU's infrastructure and services, based in Luxembourg. The government was also concerned with consolidating the country as a European seat. In June 2001 building work commenced on the Place de l’Europe in Luxembourg-Kirchberg. The project included two office towers, an extension of the conference centre as well as a concert hall. The conversion of industrial wastelands of ARBED in Belval constituted the second large construction project started under this government. This development project which aimed to improve the Southern region, manifested the government's decentralisation policy. In February 2001, the company Agora, including representatives of the State, ARBED, and the communes of Esch-sur-Alzette and Sanem, was created to develop the wastelands. The Fonds Belval, a state-owned company, was charged with realising the government's plans on the Belval-Ouest site and to showcase the blast furnaces. The industrial wastelands would host the "Centre de musiques amplifiées" (Rockhal) and a "Cité des sciences, de la recherche et de l’innovation". In healthcare, the government would concentrate its efforts to stem the explosion of costs. A hospital plan provided for the reorganisation of healthcare, by putting more emphasis on outpatient treatment, and rationalising and modernising existing infrastructures.

=== Sustainable development ===
Very quickly, the government had made sustainable development a policy priority. As part of its pledge to implement the Kyoto Protocol, Luxembourg had committed on the European level to reducing its greenhouse gas emission by 28% by 2012. The government also implemented a strategy aimed at promoting public transport and housing with low energy consumption, rational use of energy, and use of renewable energy. The restructuring of the steel industry had already made it possible to reduce emissions significantly. However, the high petrol use, caused by the low taxation of fuel which attracted large numbers of cross-border customers, made it difficult to comply with the Kyoto commitments. In January 2002, the Minister for Transport presented the programme mobiliteit.lu, whose main goal was to persuade one quarter of travellers in Luxembourg to use public transport. In this light, the connection of Luxembourg to the trans-European railway network and a new line connecting the central railway station to the Kirchberg quarter, via the airport, were considered essential investments. In March 2002, the government proposed an all-round approach to mobility and development, in order to concentrate its efforts. The result of this approach was an integrated plan for transport and spatial development (Integriertes Landes- und Verkehrsentwicklungskonzept – IVL). This document had the advantage of highlighting certain imbalances and initiating a vast public debate on the means of avoiding a deterioration of the level of quality of life of Luxembourgers, while pursuing the country's economic growth. Prohibitively high housing prices had led to an urban exodus. However, the capital and its surrounding communes still contained two-thirds of all jobs. Luxembourg had become a country of long journeys, and the majority of these took place by car. The IVL sought to bring places of work, housing and leisure closer together. It proposed a development model based on three urban areas, separated by green belts: the Southern region of the country, the capital, and the "Nordstad". These three urban centres should possess the necessary economic, social and cultural infrastructure to function independently.

=== Education and culture ===
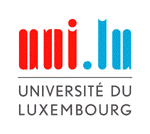
University of Luxembourg logo

At the extraordinary European Council of Lisbon in March 2000, the EU had called for the formation of a "Europe of innovation and knowledge". The Luxembourgish government adopted this goal, giving a new impulse to national policy on research and technological development. In January 2000, the "Fonds national de la recherche" (National Research Fund), for which the law had been created under the previous legislature, started its work. The government also changed direction in the university policy it had pursued until then. It decided to create the University of Luxembourg. This was to be a public institution with an international dimension, offering multilingual teaching and personalised support, and which would have a great interest in the mobility of its students. In the area of secondary education, it also became necessary to undertake some critical examination. The Programme for International Student Assessment (PISA), which evaluated students' performances, put Luxembourg in 30th place out of 32 countries. The priority in future would be a "back to basics" approach which valued quality over quantity. Finally, in the context of the knowledge society, culture remained a fundamental concern. In September 2003, the Luxembourgish government proposed to extend scope of Luxembourg, the European Capital of Culture 2007, to the Greater Region, which was accepted by the jury.

=== Internet ===
As a sign of its openness towards new technologies, the government launched a programme of national action, "e-Luxembourg", which made public services accessible via the Internet. The creation of a series of Internet sites by the Luxembourgish state was certainly one of the novelties of the 1999-2004 period. Citizens could now access information on public sites and undertake administrative processes online. The internal functioning of the State became more efficient.
