= LGBTQ rights in Luxembourg =

- Location of Luxembourg (dark green) – in Europe (light green & dark grey) – in the European Union (light green) – [Legend]
- Legal status: Legal since 1794, age of consent (re)equalised in 1992
- Gender identity: Transgender people allowed to change legal gender without surgery
- Military: Gays, lesbians and bisexuals allowed to serve openly
- Discrimination protections: Sexual orientation and "change of sex" protected (see below)

Family rights
- Recognition of relationships: Partnership since 2004; Same-sex marriage since 2015
- Adoption: Full adoption rights since 2015

Lesbian, gay, bisexual, transgender, and queer (LGBTQ) people in Luxembourg have the same legal rights as non-LGBTQ people. Partnerships, which grant many of the benefits of marriage, have been recognised since 2004. In June 2014, the Luxembourgish Parliament passed a law enabling same-sex marriage and adoption rights, which took effect on 1 January 2015. Additionally, discrimination on the basis of sexual orientation and "change of sex" in employment, healthcare and the provision of goods and services is outlawed, and transgender people are allowed to change their legal gender on the basis of self-determination.

Luxembourgish society is noted as tolerant of homosexuality and same-sex relationships. Xavier Bettel, who served as the Prime Minister of Luxembourg from 2013 to 2023, is openly homosexual. Polling in 2019 from the Eurobarometer found that 87% of Luxembourgers believed gay, lesbian and bisexual people should enjoy the same rights as heterosexual people, one of the highest in the European Union. In 2021, ILGA-Europe ranked Luxembourg third in the European Union for LGBT rights protection.

== Law regarding same-sex sexual activity ==
Same-sex sexual activity was decriminalised in 1794 (when the country was a French possession). Article 372 of the Penal Code sets the age of consent to 16, regardless of sexual orientation or gender. This was increased to 18 for same-sex sexual activity in 1971 by the addition of article 372 to the Penal Code, which was repealed in 1992.

== Recognition of same-sex relationships ==
Partnerships have been available in Luxembourg since 2004. Partnerships, called partenariat in French and Partnerschaft in Luxembourgish and German, are based on the French PACS model. The law which permits these unions was enacted on 1 November 2004.

In 2009, the Government of Luxembourg announced its intention to legalise same-sex marriage. However, after much delay, a final vote was not held until June 2014, when it passed by 56 votes to 4 and took effect on 1 January 2015.

== Adoption and family planning ==
After a parliamentary vote in June 2014, a law granting full adoption rights to same-sex couples came into effect on 1 January 2015. Additionally, lesbian couples can access IVF and medically assisted insemination treatments.

A same-sex parenting case has been tested through the courts. After their twin boys were born in California via surrogacy, a same-sex couple sought citizenship for their children. In May 2017, Justice Minister Félix Braz granted Luxembourgish citizenship to one of the boys, but in December refused to grant citizenship to the other child. The couple filed suit. In January 2019, the Administrative Court of Luxembourg reversed the decision of the Minister of Justice. The judges considered that the complaint was well founded. As both parents are recorded on California birth documents, the judges concluded that Braz was wrong to grant citizenship to one child and to deny citizenship to the other—even if one of the applicants is not the biological father.

== Discrimination protections ==
Luxembourgish law prohibits discrimination (both direct and indirect) based on sexual orientation and "change of sex" (within the definition of sex) in employment, education, social security, healthcare, and the provision of goods and services. In addition, hate crime legislation also refers to these characteristics and they are recognised as aggravating factors. Article 1 of the anti-discrimination law, commonly referred to as the Law of 28 november 2006 on equal treatment (French: Loi du 28 novembre 2006 sur l'égalité de traitement; Luxembourgish: Gesetz vum 28. November 2006 zu der Gläichbehandlung; German: Gleichbehandlungsgesetz vom 28. November 2006), reads as follows:

Any direct or indirect discrimination based on religion or religious convictions, disability, age, sexual orientation, membership or non-membership, true or perceived, to a race or ethnicity is forbidden.

Luxembourgish nationals are allowed to serve in the Armed Forces regardless of sexual orientation.

As part of its LGBT Action Plan 2018–2023, Luxembourg has pledged to ensure inclusive educational opportunities for LGBT students, combat violence, harassment and discrimination, guarantee equal treatment in access to health care services and employment, and assure the equality of transgender and intersex individuals.

== Transgender rights ==
In the past, Luxembourg legally required transgender people to undergo surgery, sterilization and divorce before a change of gender on identification documents. However, on 12 May 2017, the Council of Government approved a bill to regulate the procedure of legal sex changes. An adult person would need to submit an application to the Ministry of Justice to change their legal sex. No surgery, sterilization, divorce or other medical treatment would be required. Minors even under the age of 5 would be able to apply for a sex change with the consent of their legal guardians. On 31 May, the bill was submitted to the Parliament, and was approved in a 57–3 vote on 25 July 2018. On 27 July 2018, the Council of State gave its consent to skip the second vote. It was promulgated by the Grand Duke on 10 August and published in the official journal on 12 September. The law took effect on 16 September 2018.

== Blood donation ==
Since January 2021, donors who have had sexual relations with men who have sex with men (MSM) are allowed to donate plasma, regardless of gender. After 12 months of not having sexual contact with MSM, donors are allowed to donate blood.

== LGBT rights movement in Luxembourg ==
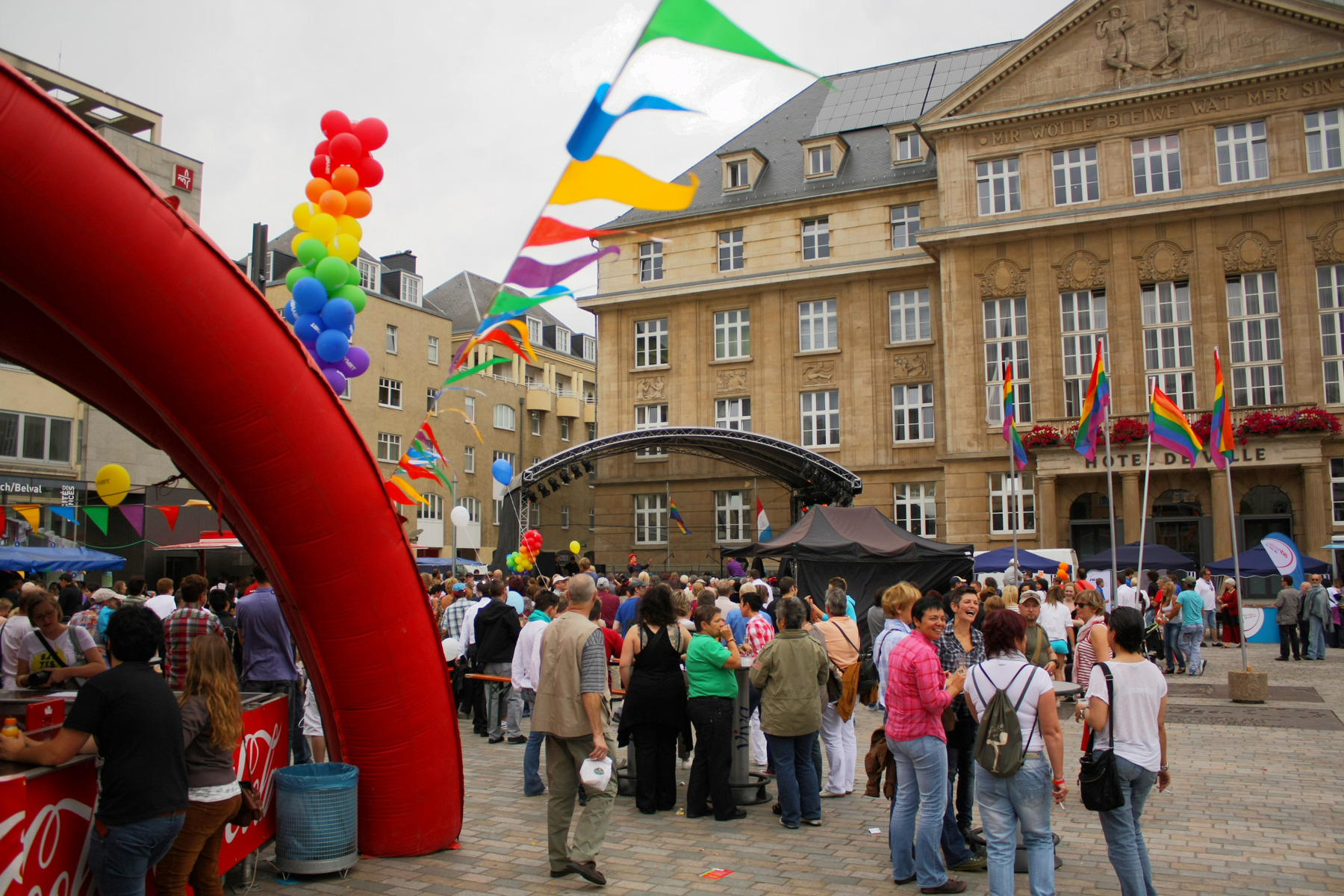
The 2011 Gaymat Festival in Esch-sur-Alzette

Luxembourg's main LGBT rights group is Pink Luxembourg (Luxembourgish: Rosa Lëtzebuerg). It was founded on 26 June 1996 and had 220 members by 2004. Its aims are to promote the civil rights of LGBT people, to fight against discrimination, to work in terms of social, cultural and legal matters for full equality, and to organise social and cultural activities. It organizes annual pride demonstrations, known as the Gaymat Festival. Intersex & Transgender Luxembourg (ITGL) campaigns for transgender and intersex rights.

== Public opinion ==
A Eurobarometer survey published in December 2006 showed that 58% of Luxembourgers surveyed supported same-sex marriage and 39% supported adoption by same-sex couples. The EU-wide average in this survey was 44% and 33%, respectively. Support for same-sex marriage had increased to 75% by 2015 according to the same pollster.

The 2019 Eurobarometer showed that 87% of Luxembourgers believed gay and bisexual people should enjoy the same rights as heterosexual people, and 85% supported same-sex marriage.

The 2023 Eurobarometer found that 84% of Luxembourgers thought same-sex marriage should be allowed throughout Europe, and 86% agreed that "there is nothing wrong in a sexual relationship between two persons of the same sex".

== Summary table ==
| Same-sex sexual activity legal | Yes (Since 1794) |
| Equal age of consent (16) | Yes (Since 1992) |
| Anti-discrimination laws in employment | Yes (Since 2006) |
| Anti-discrimination laws in the provision of goods and services | Yes (Since 2006) |
| Anti-discrimination laws in all other areas (incl. indirect discrimination, hate speech) | Yes (Since 2006) |
| Anti-discrimination laws concerning gender identity | Yes (Under "change of sex") |
| Same-sex marriage | Yes (Since 2015) |
| Recognition of same-sex couples | Yes (Since 2004) |
| Stepchild adoption by same-sex couples | Yes (Since 2015) |
| Joint adoption by same-sex couples | Yes (Since 2015) |
| Gays, lesbians and bisexuals allowed to serve openly in the military | Yes |
| Right to change legal gender | Yes |
| Gender self-identification | Yes |
| Legal recognition of non-binary gender | No |
| Legal recognition of intersex people | |
| Conversion therapy banned on minors | No |
| Access to IVF for lesbian couples | Yes |
| Commercial surrogacy for gay male couples | No (Banned regardless of sexual orientation) |
| MSMs allowed to donate blood | Yes / No (since 2021, one-year deferral period) |

== See also ==
- Politics of Luxembourg
- LGBT rights in Europe
- LGBT rights in the European Union
