= Negele =

Negele is the name of two towns in the Oromia Region of Ethiopia:

- Negele Arsi (or Arsi Negele), in Mirab Arsi Zone
- Negele Boran, in Guji Zone

== People ==
- Negele Knight (born 1967), American basketball player
- Hubert Negele (1919–1994), Liechtensteiner alpine skier
- John W. Negele (born 1944), American theoretical nuclear physicist
- Sharon Negele, American politician

== See also ==
- Josef Negele
