= Carlo Wagner =

Luxembourgish politician (1953–2021)

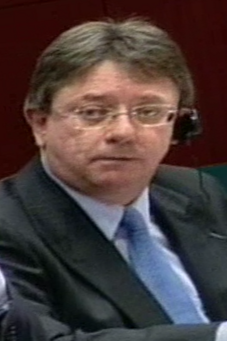
Wagner in 2002

Carlo Wagner (3 July 1953 – 12 February 2021) was a Luxembourgish politician of the Democratic Party. He served as Mayor of Wormeldange and as a member of the Chamber of Deputies for the East Constituency between 1994 and 1999 and between 2004 and 2013. He was also the Minister of Health under the Juncker–Polfer Ministry between 1999 and 2004. He died at the age of 67 following a long battle with illness.
