= Nicolas Schmit =

Luxembourgish politician (born 1953)

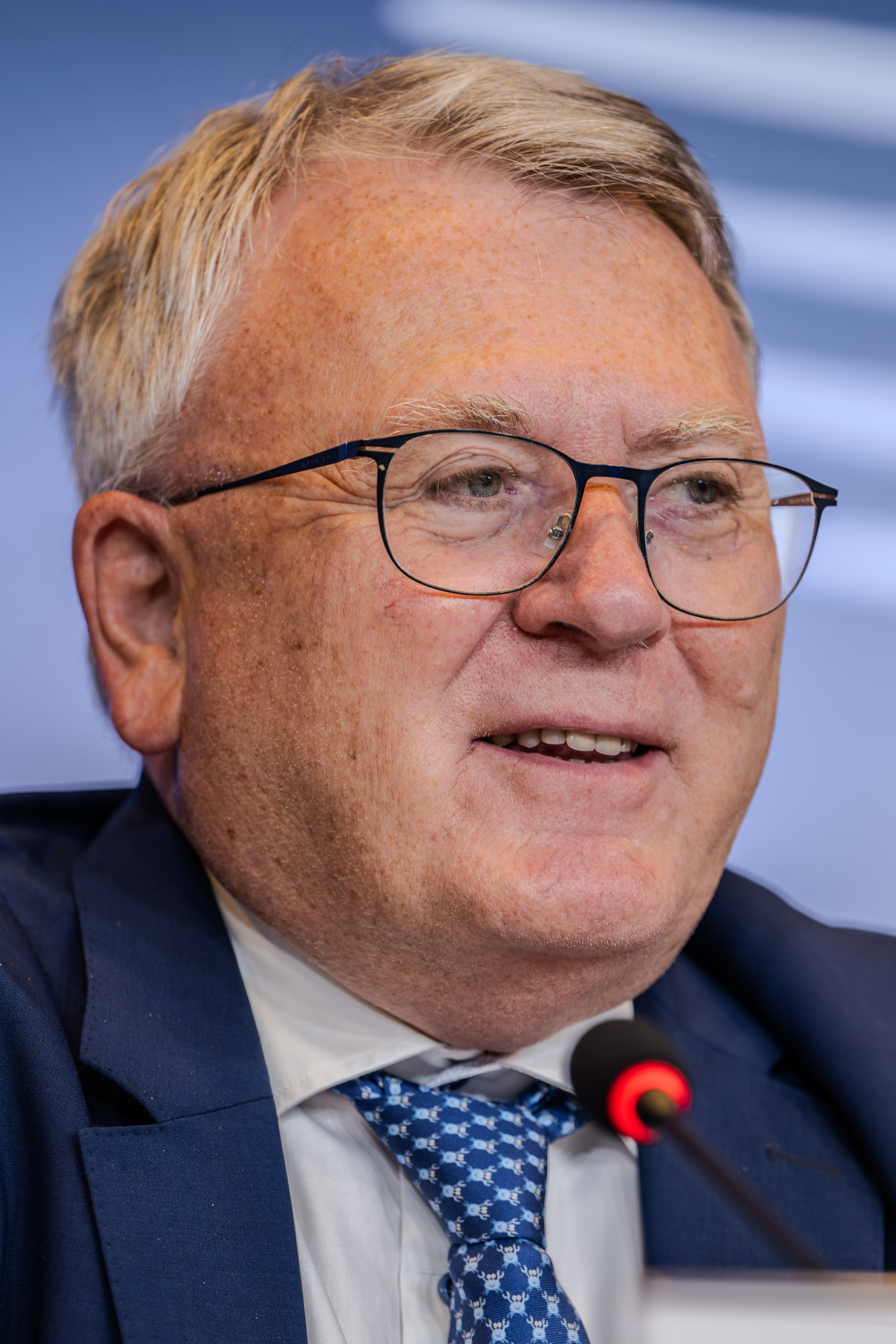
- Schmit in 2024

European Commissioner for Jobs and Social Rights
- In office 1 December 2019 – 1 December 2024
- Commission: Von der Leyen I
- Preceded by: Marianne Thyssen
- Succeeded by: Roxana Mînzatu

Member of the European Parliament for Luxembourg
- In office 1 July 2019 – 1 December 2019
- Succeeded by: Marc Angel

Minister of Labour, Employment and Social and Solidarity Economy
- In office 23 July 2009 – 5 December 2018
- Prime Minister: Jean-Claude Juncker; Xavier Bettel
- Preceded by: François Biltgen
- Succeeded by: Dan Kersch

Personal details
- Born: 10 December 1953 (age 72) Differdange, Luxembourg
- Party: Luxembourg Socialist Workers'
- Other political affiliations: Party of European Socialists
- Children: 4
- Education: Sciences Po Aix; Aix-Marseille University

Nicolas Schmit (born 10 December 1953) is a Luxembourgish politician who served as European Commissioner for Jobs and Social Rights from 2019 to 2024. A member of the Luxembourg Socialist Workers' Party (LSAP), he was the EU-wide Spitzenkandidat of the centre-left PES at the 2024 EU elections. He was previously a member of the government of Luxembourg from 2004 to 2019 and a member of the European Parliament (MEP) in 2019.

== Early life and education ==
Schmit studied economics in France at the Institut d'études politiques d'Aix-en-Provence.

== Career ==
In 1979, Schmit started his political and diplomatic career as an attaché in the Prime Minister's office in Luxembourg, followed by the Foreign Ministry. In 1989, he became Secretary to the LSAP's delegation in the Chamber of Deputies. He was appointed to the Council of State on 29 October 1991, replacing René Grégorius.

In 2004, Schmit was appointed to the first Juncker-Asselborn Government as Minister-Delegate for Foreign Affairs and Immigration, working under Jean Asselborn as Minister for Foreign Affairs.

After the 2009 election, in which Schmit was elected for the Est constituency as the sole LSAP deputy, he did not take his seat but was reappointed to the government. He was promoted to the office of Minister of Labour, Employment and Immigration of Luxembourg. He is the chairman of the EPSCO network of the Party of European Socialists.

Since the 2019 European elections, Schmit has been a Member of the European Parliament, where he belongs to the Progressive Alliance of Socialists and Democrats (S&D) group. He has since been serving on the Committee on Employment and Social Affairs.

== Controversy ==
In January 2011, Xavier Bettel claimed that Schmit exerted undue influence on the Grand Ducal Police to drop charges against his 18-year-old son the previous month. Schmit denied that his assistance of his son amounted to undue influence, saying that his "conscience is clear".

== Personal life ==
He is married and has four children.

== Footnotes ==
Political offices
Preceded by Jean-Claude Juncker	Luxembourgish European Commissioner; 2019–	Incumbent
