= Juncker-Asselborn Ministry =

The Juncker-Asselborn Ministry may refer to:

- Juncker-Asselborn Ministry I
- Juncker-Asselborn Ministry II
