= Magel (surname) =

Magel is a Dutch surname. Notable people with the surname include:

- Charles R. Magel (1920–2014), American philosopher, animal rights activist and bibliographer

== See also ==
- Nagel
