= Lex Delles =

Luxembourgish politician

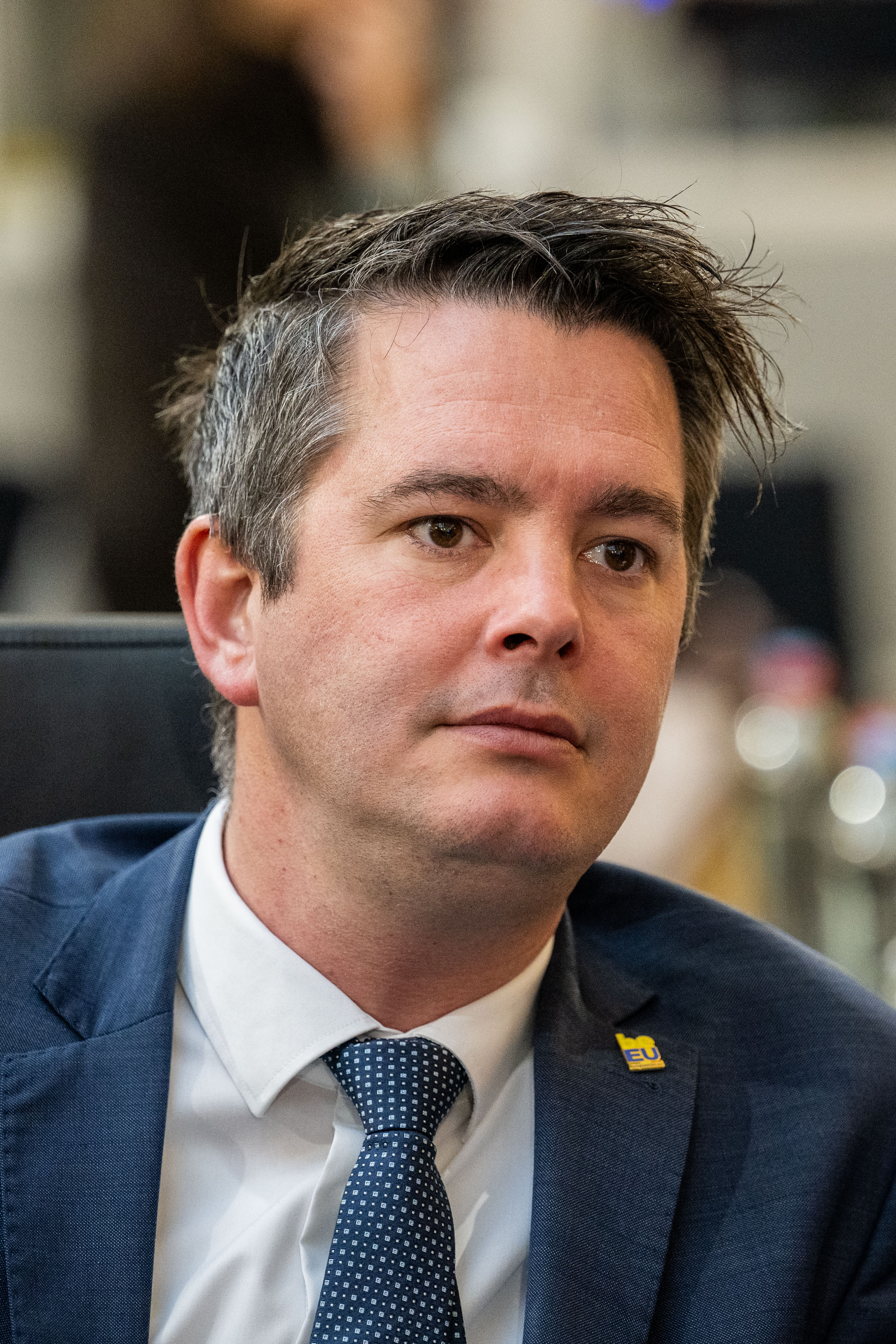
- Delles in 2024

President of the Democratic Party
- In office 12 June 2022 – 27 April 2025
- Preceded by: Corinne Cahen
- Succeeded by: Carole Hartmann

Minister of Economy, SMEs and Energy
- Incumbent
- Assumed office 17 November 2023
- Prime Minister: Luc Frieden
- Government: Frieden-Bettel
- Preceded by: Franz Fayot (Economy); Claude Turmes (Energy)

Minister of Tourism
- Incumbent
- Assumed office 5 December 2018
- Prime Minister: Xavier Bettel; Luc Frieden
- Government: Bettel II; Frieden-Bettel

Mayor of Mondorf-les-Bains
- In office 17 January 2014 – 5 December 2018
- Preceded by: Maggy Nagel
- Succeeded by: Steve Reckel

Member of the Chamber of Deputies
- In office 13 November 2013 – 5 December 2018
- Succeeded by: Carole Hartmann
- Constituency: East

Personal details
- Born: 28 November 1984 (age 41) Mondorf-les-Bains, Luxembourg
- Party: Democratic Party

Lex Delles (born 28 November 1984) is a Luxembourgish politician serving as Minister for the Economy, SMEs and Energy since 2023. A member of the Democratic Party (DP), he is also Minister for Tourism since 2018 and previously served as Mayor of Mondorf-les-Bains and as a member of the Chamber of Deputies.

== Early life ==
After Delles finished his secondary studies at the Athénée royal de Neufchâteau in Belgium, he began studying law at the University of Luxembourg. However, he changed his study program and graduated in educational sciences at the Haute Ecole Robert Schuman in Virton, Belgium. After his studies, he started teaching at the primary school in Lenningen.

== Politics ==
Delles held multiple political offices in a fast career, starting in the local politics in Mondorf-les-Bains, becoming a Member of the Chamber of Deputies in 2013 and a member of the government in 2017. He has held various positions in the Democratic Party and is currently party president.

=== Party Politics ===
Delles became member of the DP and it's youth department JDL in 2010. He was president of the East District chapter of the JDL until 2013. He became vice-president of the DP in 2015, an office he held until 12 June 2022, when he was elected president of his party. As vice-president, he took a role as observer and largely remained out of the party's internal affairs and was said to keep in the background at party events. His style was described as factual and discreet. However, Delles was also described as a power politician who can, at times, be impatient and knows how to assert himself.

On 12 June 2022, Delles was elected party president at the party congress in Bertrange. Being the only candidate for the office, he received 98,35 percent of the votes. In his candidate speech, Delles emphasized the importance to combat climate change and the, in his eyes, ambitious targets the Luxembourg government had set. He explained his view that climate policy must be socially just and can only be pursued together and not against the economy. He called zero growth and austerity policies the wrong approach to the climate crisis and claimed that the willingness of the economy to switch to climate-friendly alternatives was "immense".

=== Local Politics ===
According to his own statements, Delles ran for local office in 2011 because he was annoyed by little annoyances in everyday life in his home town of Mondorf. As his late father Roland Delles was mayor of Mondorf from 1993 to 1996, Delles is said to have learned the ropes of local politics accompanying his father to local events such as receptions, sporting events and inaugurations. He received the second most votes and became first alderman in a coalition of DP and The Greens. He was sworn in on 7 November 2011. After the 2013 general election, then-mayor Maggy Nagel became Minister of Culture and Public Housing, an office incompatible with being mayor. As the next ranking politician, Delles became mayor of Mondorf-les-Bains. Being also a Member of the Chamber of Deputies, Delles was the youngest deputé-maire, being 29 years old at the time.

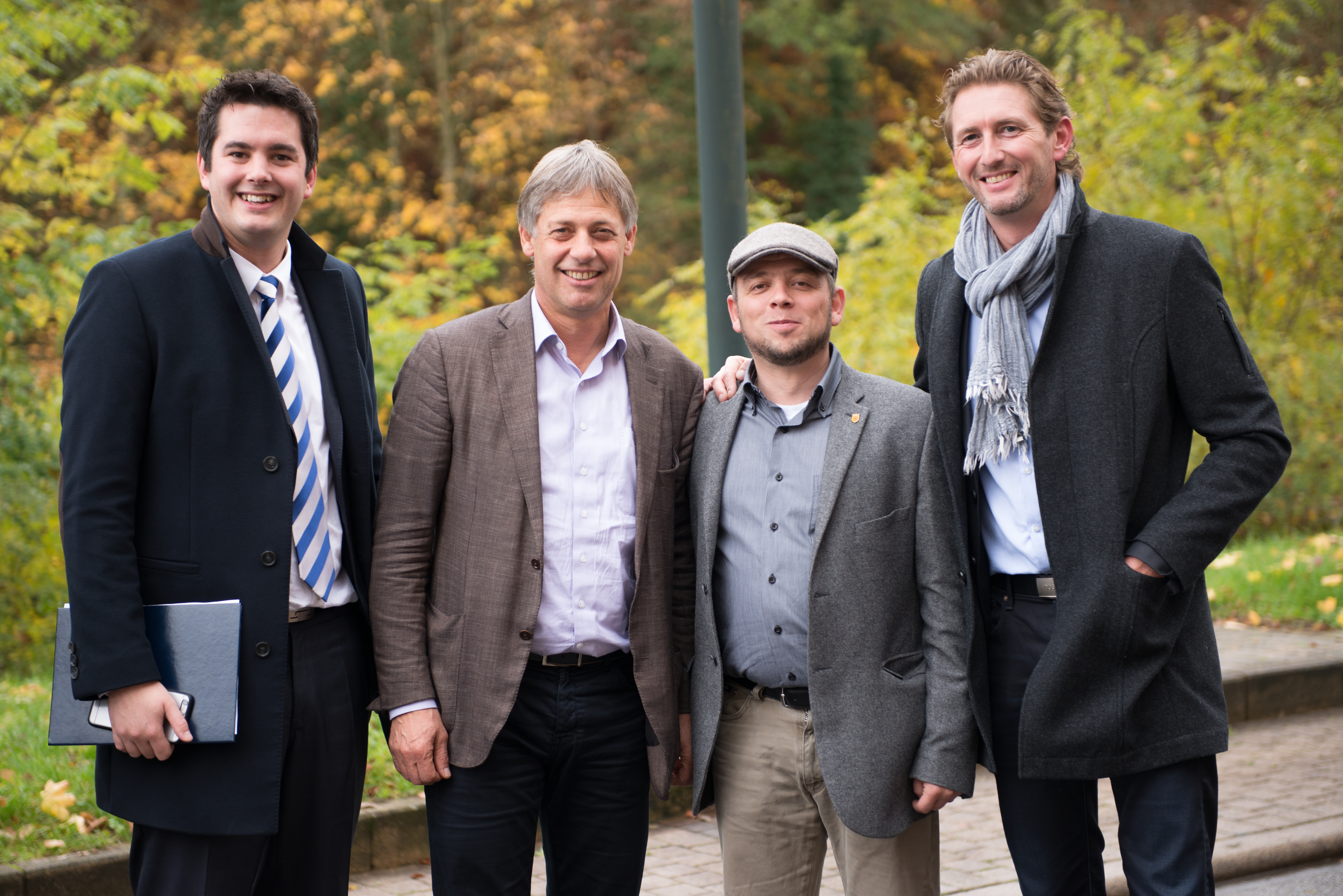
Lex Delles (left) as mayor of Mondorf-les-Bains, next with mayor of Remich Henri Kox, and aldermen Steve Reckel and Steve Schleck, in 2015.

In the local elections in 2017, Delles received the most votes and his party had a ruling majority of 6 from 11 seats. However, he decided to form another coalition with The Greens, citing his friendship with and loyalty to Alderman Steve Schleck as reason. This agreement also brought a certain stability for Delles, as his majority was one seat larger.

As part of his municipal responsibilities, Delles was chairman of the Syndicat intercommunal pour la création, l'aménagement, la promotion et l'exploitation d'une zone d'activités économiques à caractère régional dans le canton de Remich (SIAER - Triangle vert) from March 2014 until December 2018.

=== Chamber of Deputies ===
The 2013 general election was Delles first try at a national mandate. He was a candidate in the East constituency, where he was number three on the list of candidates. Lead candidate in the east was Maggy Nagel, with whom Delles was working together in local politics. She is considered his political mentor. Delles got the second most votes of his party in his constituency. As his party won back a second seat in the East, he was elected to the Chamber of Deputies.

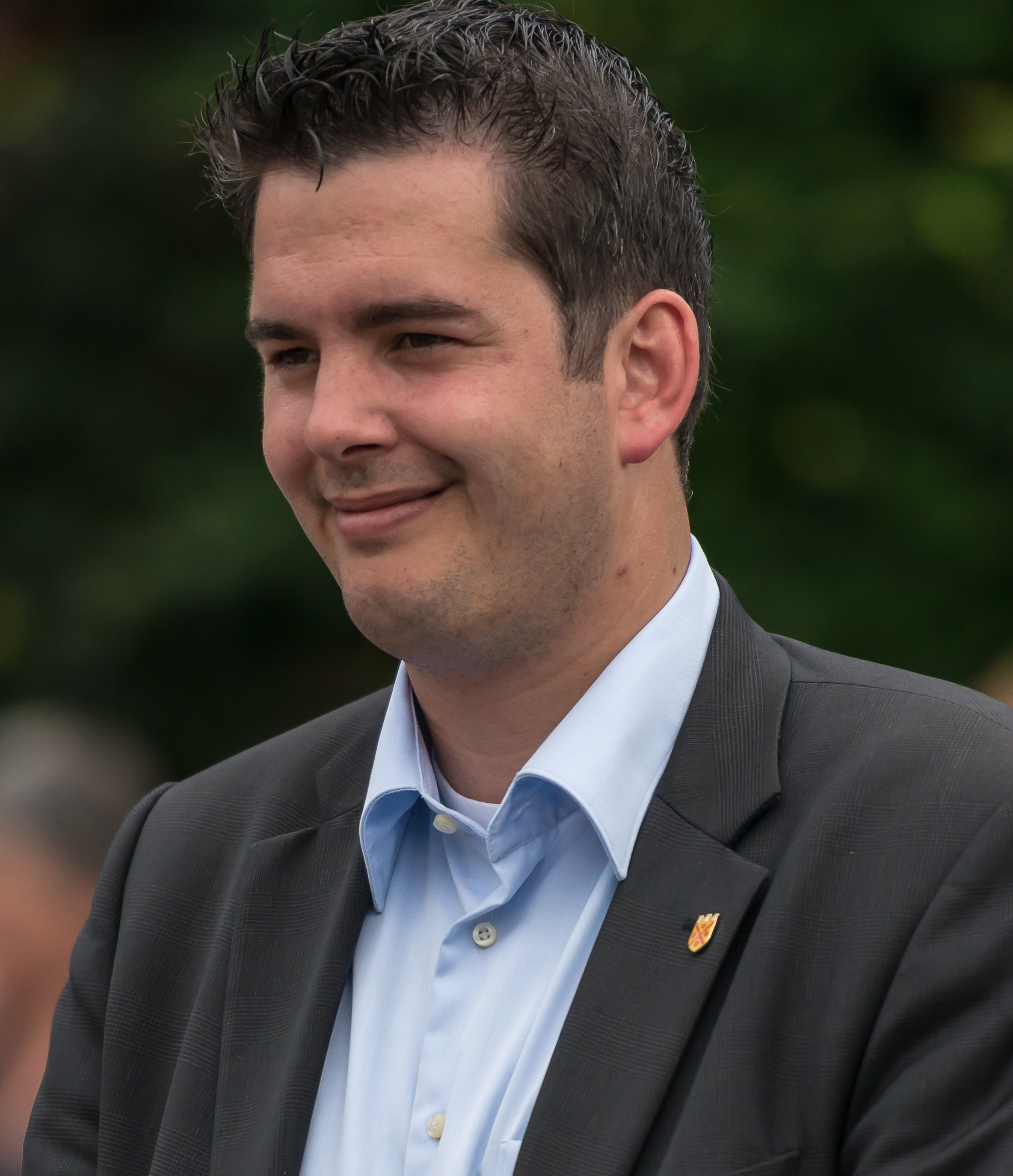
Delles in 2016

Delles was chairman of the commission for education, children and youth from 2013 to 2018. He was a member of the commissions on civil service and administrative reform; on agriculture, viticulture, rural development and consumer protection; on culture; on petitions; on public housing; on Higher Education, Research, Media, Communications and Space (for the Higher Education and Research aspects); and on Institutions and Constitutional Review (for certain law projects). From 2015 to 2018, Delles was also an alternate member of the Luxembourg delegation to the Benelux Interparliamentary Consultative Council. During his term, Delles asked a total of 45 parliamentary questions, often related to local matters in his town of Mondorf-les-Bains, where he mayor. He was rapporteur on 24 bills, mainly in the area of education, where he was president of the commission, but also some laws in the area of institutional reform, in particular the separation of church and state. Delles was described as "not being very active" in the Chamber of Deputies. When Maggy Nagel resigned as Minister for Housing and Culture in 2015, it was speculated that Delles could take over as Minister, as he was from the same constituency. Later, it was revealed that he was asked, but refused the post.

Delles was lead candidate in the East constituency for his party for the general election in 2018. During the election campaign, Delles dedicated himself to education policy as an election campaign issue, emphasising the reforms of the previous legislative period that his fellow party member Claude Meisch had initiated and for which he had been rapporteur. His home town of Mondorf-les-Bains was one of four communes where the DP had the majority of votes. Delles got 10 401 votes, the second most in his constituency. His party won two seats again, and went from 18,63 percent of the votes to 20,66 percent. As he became part of the government, Delles second mandate as member of the Chamber of Deputies was short, from 30 October to 5 December 2018. During this time, he was interim president of the DP parliamentary group. Delles was also replaced as mayor of Mondorf-les-Bains by Steve Reckel.

=== Minister for Small and Medium-Sized Enterprises and Minister for Tourism ===
Before the coalition agreement between DP, LSAP and The Greens was finalised and the Bettel II government was presented, Delles was already speculated as being part of the government, as Minister of Interior. He was sworn in as Minister for Small and Medium-Sized Enterprises and Minister for Tourism on 5 December 2018. With 34 years, he was the youngest member of the government. At the beginning of his term, Delles stated his priorities were the strengthening of congress tourism, regulation of homestay providers such as Airbnb, the expansion of tourist cycling and hiking trails and, for small and medium-sized enterprises, a reform of the law on shop opening hours.

Due to the COVID-19 pandemic, not all of these projects, for example the reform of opening hours, could be realised. Delles focussed instead to aiding the struggling tourism and hospitality industry in Luxembourg, mostly by giving out financial aids. This led to heightened media presence: During 2020, Delles was among the four people that were invited most often – four times – for the daily interview show Invité vun der Redaktioun at RTL Radio Luxembourg, the most important radio station in the country. He was the only politician to be invited this often. This might have helped his popularity: between October 2019 and November 2020, his poll ratings rose by ten per cent and he climbed from 16th to sixth place in the ratings within a year. In April 2021, Delles stated that his ministry had paid over 326 million Euro in financial aid, with over 197 million being non-refundable aid. 92 million of these had been paid out to hotels and other tourism related enterprises. Since the tourism sector was hit hard by the effects of the measures against the pandemic, he promoted domestic tourism.

One measure was the issuing of 50 Euro hotel vouchers to all Luxembourg residents over the age of 16 and all cross-border commuters in order to boost tourism in the Grand Duchy. In November 2020, only 67 000 out of 730 096 vouchers had been used. Some hotel owners criticized the action and the governmental aids as too low to be able to secure their survival. The vouchers were originally valid until 31 December 2020, but their validity was first extended until 18 April 2021 and a second time until 15 September 2021. At the end of March 2021, 108 744 vouchers had been used, amounting to over 5,4 million Euro in financial aid for the tourism sector. Other measures to promote domestic tourism introduced in 2020 were a service to transport luggage from one hotel to another when tourists were cycling or hiking and the Vëlosummer (bike summer). Initially, 16 country roads would be closed to motorised traffic and thus become an additional option for leisure cyclists. However, nine communes vetoed the plans on their territory and other routes were changed in a manner that the project was a lot smaller than presented at the beginning. The Vëlosummer would continue in the following years, accompanied by criticism that longer cycle tours were only possible on a few weekends because many municipalities did not agree that roads on their territory should be closed to motorised traffic for a longer period of time.

In May 2021, Delles announced the Grand-Duchy of Luxembourg would buy back the boat MS Regensburg previously known as Marie-Astrid II, which was floating on the river Moselle when the Schengen agreement was signed on 14 June 1985. The boat had been sold in 1992. On 3 August 2021, Delles signed the purchase agreement for 630 000 Euro. The boat was to be renovated and turned into a museum which would be anchored in the town of Schengen. The whole project should be finished in 2025 and was projected to cost around 6 million Euro. Delles stated that he was very proud of the "special project of the return of the first MS 'Princesse Marie-Astrid' to Luxembourg" and that during his political career it had been a real thorn in his side that Luxembourg had sold the ship, which represented one of the biggest milestones in EU history.

At the end of his term, Delles stated that he had reduced the processing time for business establishment licences to less than seven days on average. He also introduced new assistance for start-ups and passed a law that gives entrepreneurs a second chance so that they are no longer excluded from setting up another company in the event of bankruptcy. These regulatory actions were seen as an indication that Delles is very economically liberal. Delles also emphasised the importance of ecologically sound tourism, which would attract nature loving tourists to Luxembourg.

During the campaign for the 2023 general election, Delles was again lead candidate for the DP in the East constituency, together with Carole Hartmann. Again, his home town of Mondorf-les-Bains was one of the five communes where his party obtaind a plurality of the votes. Delles got 13 042 votes, close to CSV candidate Léon Gloden who got the most votes in the East. His party got 22,92 percent of the votes, compared to 20,66 percent of the votes in the 2018 election, which translated in two out of six seats of the constituency. As such, Delles won a seat in the Chamber of Deputies, but as he was still a member of the government, he did not take it up, the two functions being incompatible. Delles was part of the DP delegation incoalition talks with the CSV, which resulted in the formation of the Frieden-Bettel government.

=== Minister for the Economy, SMEs and Energy ===
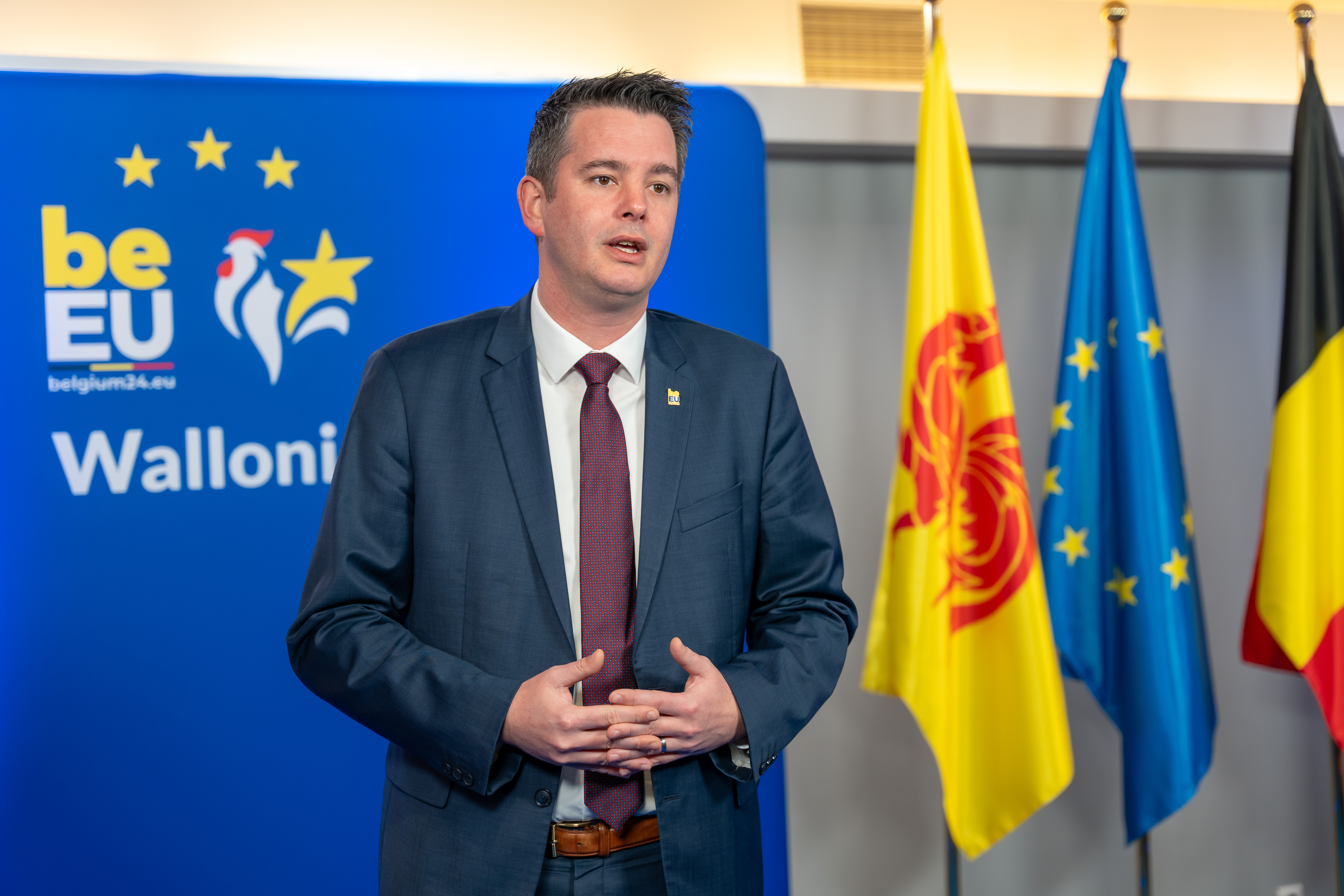
Delles in 2024

On 17 November 2023, Delles was sworn in as Minister for the Economy, SME and Tourism, together with the other members of the government. As competences shifted with the new coalition treaty, external trade was now one of the responsibilities of the new Foreign Minister Xavier Bettel. The energy portfolio, which had been a separate ministry during the Bettel II government, is now again part of the Ministry of Economy.

In December 2023, Delles stated that his priorities for the new legislative period were the development of new areas for business parks and the expansion of Luxembourg's data centre capacities for artificial intelligence. He also wants to expand the sectors of space activities, health tech, logistics and transport. Attracting talent in the skilled trades and the hotel and catering industry is also important. In the area of renewable energy expansion, the CSV-DP government wants to abolish the private pre-financing of state subsidies so that people who have a photovoltaic system installed on their roof only have to pay the difference between the state subsidy and the price. During a debate about the stance of the government on nuclear power in May 2024, Delles emphasised the need for expansion of renewable energies, but stated that Luxembourg, importing 84 percent of its electricity, should hold back its opinion towards countries that have or want to build nuclear power plants. Energy prices, which had risen in 2022 due to the energy crisis, had since been subsidised by the Luxembourg government in order to ease the burden on households. These subsidies are due to expire in 2025. In February 2024, Delles said he was in favour of a slow phase-out of these measures.

== Personal life ==
Delles is married to Romain Mousty, the owner of a shoe shop in Mondorf-les-Bains.
