= Nagel =

Nagel can refer to:

- Nagel (surname), a surname and people with that surname
- Nagel, Bavaria, a municipality in the district of Wunsiedel, Bavaria, Germany

== See also ==
- Nagel point, a geometric center of a triangle
- Nagle (disambiguation)
