= Nagle, Missouri =

Extinct hamlet in Missouri, U.S.

Coordinates: 37°10′00″N 91°49′10″W

Nagle or Nogle is an extinct town in southeast Texas County, in the U.S. state of Missouri. The GNIS classifies it as a populated place. The community was located just east of Missouri Route 137 and north of the North Prong of Jacks Fork Creek. The local road, Nagle Drive, serves the area just east of Route 137.

A post office called Nagle was established in 1904, and remained in operation until 1925. The community has the name of C. H. Nagle, original owner of the site. Nagle Christian church is still there since 1899
