= Stephen Howard Naegle =

American artist

Stephen Howard Naegle, American watercolor artist, was born in Toquerville, Utah in 1938. He attended first, Southern Utah University and later graduated with a Bachelor of Fine Arts Degree and Master of Fine Arts Degree in 1968 and 1969, respectively, from Utah State University. He taught art, drawing, ceramics and sculpture at Arkansas Polytechnic College, Russellville, Arkansas and Casper College, Casper Wyoming. Mr. Naegle created possibly thousands of watercolors in his short 42 years, as well as a number of major oil paintings.

A former student of Mr. Naegle decided to create a website documenting his life's work beginning in 2004. Three hundred seventeen art works are now documented on this website, . The site contains biographical information, a catalogue of works, photographs of many of his paintings, and a few short stories of his life. This is an educational, not-for-profit website. A work in progress, additional works are sought to broaden the depth of the artist's work.

Publications containing information regarding Mr. Naegle are: 1.) Masters of Western Art, Mary Carroll Nelson, Watson/Guptill Publications, New York, 1981. 2.) Stephen Naegle, a booklet, Nicolaysen Art Museum, Casper, Wyoming, 1988. 3.) Plant Forms and Weathered Buildings in Watercolor, Master's Thesis on Microfilm, Stephen H. Naegle, Utah State University, Merril-Cazier Library, 1969.

4.) Southwest Art Magazine, Annual Collectors Edition, October 1980. Stephen Naegle exhibit announced by C. G. Rein Galleries of Scottsdale, Arizona, page 22, exhibit opening October 23, 1980. Naegle oil painting, Navajo Sandstone - Sunrise, 50 by 60 inches displayed in the ad copy. Rein calls Mr. Naegle a contemporary "luminist". 5.) Online at Naeglefriends.org, 317 documented works, many with images, most in color. Also biographical information, short stories about the painter, and information about submissions for adding Naegle paintings to the Naegle Catalogue of Works, 2004 - 2007.
