= Carsten Nagel =

Danish writer

Carsten Nagel (born 1955 in Copenhagen) is a Danish author of 12 published books, including novels and short story collections, plus a feature-length film, short film and a play.
