= Josef Negele =

Josef Negele may refer to:

- Josef Nagele (born 1848), Mayor of Planken
- Josef Negele (born 1875), Mayor of Planken
- Josef Negele (born 1898), member of the Landtag of Liechtenstein
