= Robert Mehlen =

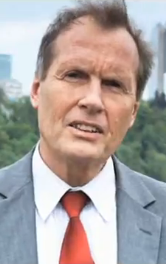
Robert Mehlen

Robert Mehlen (born 12 May 1949 in Luxembourg City) is a Luxembourgish politician, former president of the Alternative Democratic Reform Party (ADR), and farmer. He sat in the Chamber of Deputies between 1989 and 2009, representing the Circonscription Est. He was the party's president between 1991 and 2012.

He left the ADR in 2025 and gave up his title as honorary president of the party, citing what he perceived as "Putin-friendly politics" as a reason.
