= Nagle =

Nagle is a surname.

Notable people with this surname include:

- Angela Nagle (born 1971), Irish non-fiction writer and academic
- Austen Harold Nagle (1903-1984), English aeronautical meteorologist
- Browning Nagle (1968–2026), American football player
- Courtney Nagle (born 1982) American tennis player
- David R. Nagle (born 1943), American politician
- Don Nagle (1938–1999), American karate grand master
- Florence Nagle (1894–1988), British feminist, racehorse trainer and dog breeder
- Gary Nagle (born 1974/1975), South African business executive, CEO-designate of Glencore
- Jack Nagle (1917–1991), American college basketball coach
- Jacob Nagle (1761–1841), British sailor
- James Nagle (disambiguation), various people
- John Nagle, author of RFC896, see Nagle's algorithm
- John Nagle (1913–2009), Australian lawyer, soldier and jurist
- John Joseph “Jay” Nagle III (born 2000), American basketball player
- Kel Nagle (1920–2015), Australian golfer
- Leda Nagle (born 1951), Brazilian journalist and TV presenter
- Margaret Nagle (born 1969), screenwriter and TV producer
- Mary Kathryn Nagle, Cherokee playwright and lawyer
- Matt Nagle (1979–2007), one of the first people to use a brain-computer interface to restore functionality lost due to paralysis
- Nano Nagle (1718–1784), founder of the Presentation Sisters
- Noel Nagle (born 1945), Irish musician, member of The Wolfe Tones
- Patrick S. Nagle (1858–1924), American political organizer
- Rob Nagle, American actor, director, teacher, and acting coach
- Ron Nagle (born 1939), American ceramic sculptor
- Slade Nagle (born 1980), American football coach
- William Nagle (author) (1947–2002), Australian soldier and author
- William Nagle (American football), American football coach

== Fictional ==
- Mackey Nagle, a recurring character on Smart Guy

== See also ==
- Nagl, a surname
- Nagel (surname)
