= Gilles Baum =

Luxembourgish politician (born 1973)

The Honourable Gilles Baum
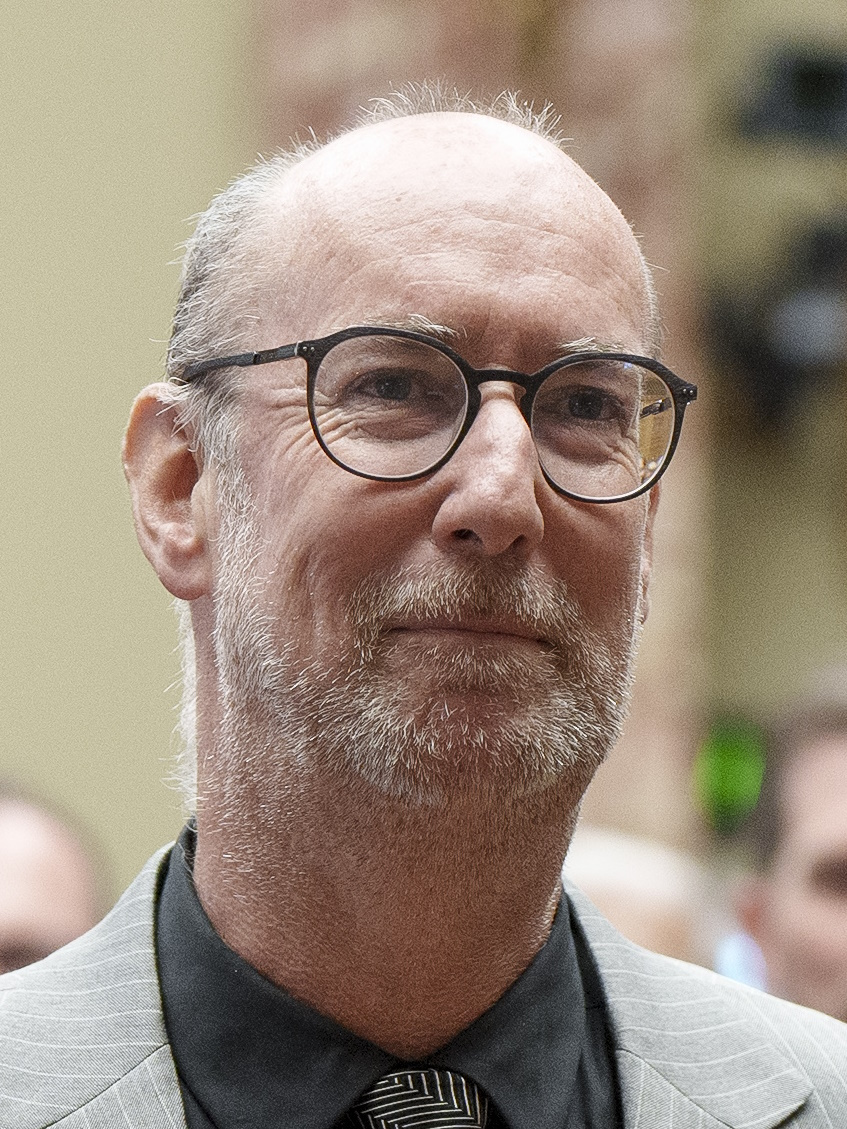
- Baum in 2023

Member of the Chamber of Deputies
- Incumbent
- Assumed office 21 November 2023
- Constituency: East

Personal details
- Born: 16 January 1973 (age 53) Luxembourg City, Luxembourg
- Party: Democratic

Gilles Baum (born 16 January 1973) is a Luxembourgish politician. He has served as a member of the Chamber of Deputies from East since 2023. He is a member of the Democratic Party.
