= Richard Nagel =

German coffee trader and artist

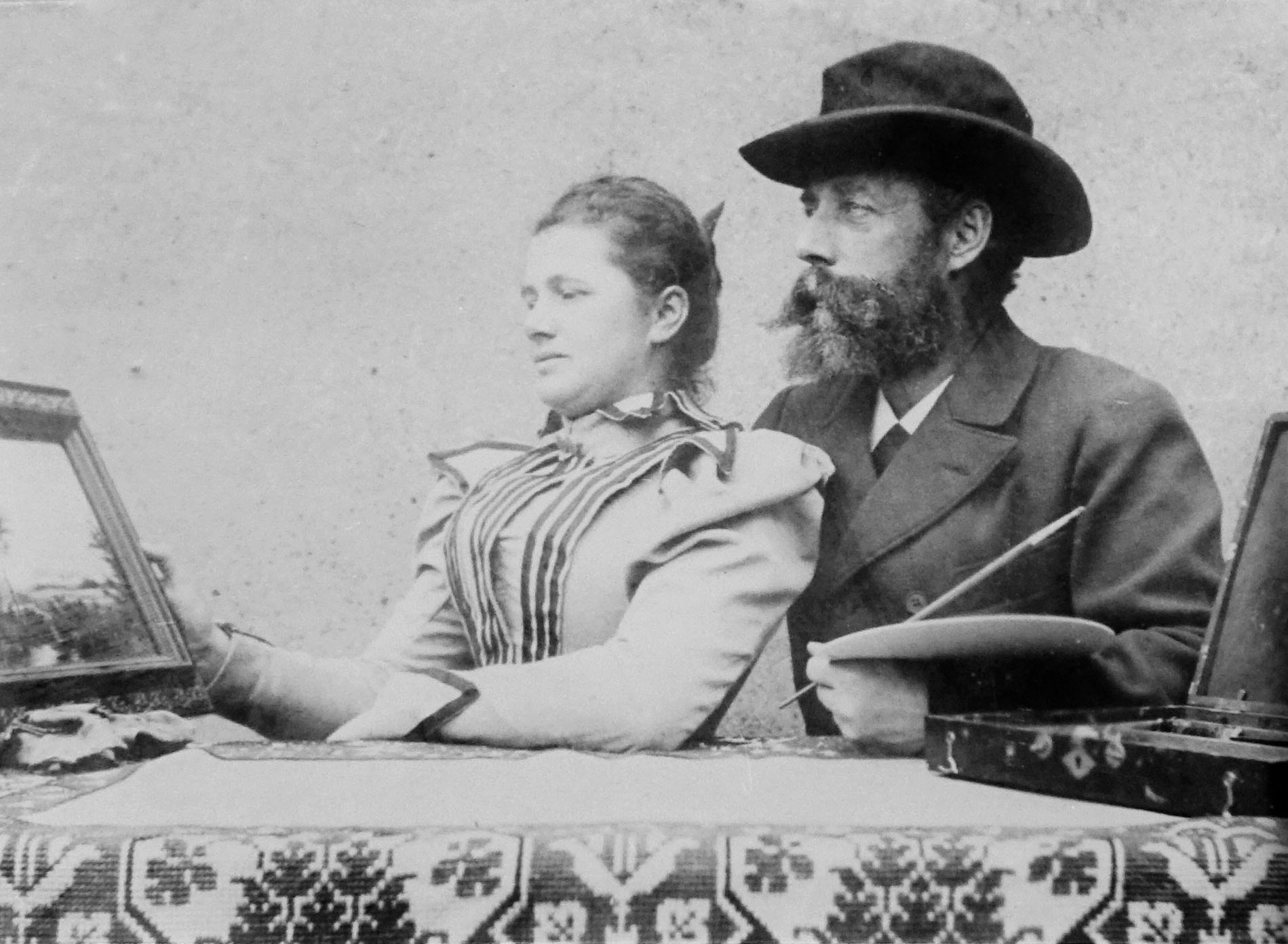
Nagel and his wife Elisabeth in 1907

Richard Nagel (10 October 1857 – 28 November 1941) was a German coffee trader, artist, photographer and naturalist. He hunted and painted pictures of the birdlife and landscape of early 20th century Bremen and surroundings in northwestern Germany.

== Life and work ==
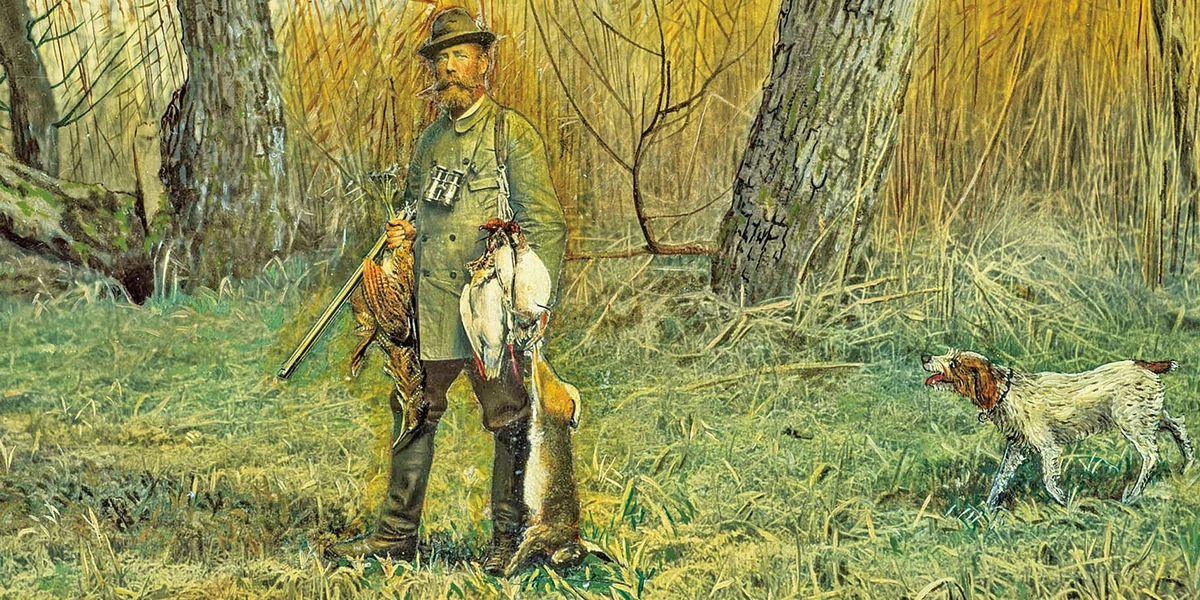
Painting by Nagel of himself on a hunt, c. 1900

Nagel was the eleventh and youngest son of pastor Wilhelm Nagel (1805–1864) of Bremen. His father taught him archery at an early age and gifted him a crossbow but died with the young Nagel was just seven. He went to school and after an apprenticeship worked in an office that he found boring. He travelled around in the surrounding wilderness areas and made a collection of birds. He became a successful coffee merchant in 1872, set up a trade in bicycles (velocipede) in 1884, the first in the city of Bremen. Nagel was an excellent artist. He was a keen hunter and he documented the birds and the landscapes using photographs and in oil paintings. He was working on a four-volume bird book, Die Vögel Nordwestdeutschlands, which remained unpublished with 741 illustrations of 335 species. He published some notes in the Deutsche Jägerzeitung. He recorded a number of marsh birds in the region and the rare black grouse. He was likely encouraged to write about the birds of the region by Gustav Hartlaub. He corresponded with other German ornithologists including Erwin Stresemann who sought measurements of curlew bills from Nagel. Nagel had suggested that there were two distinct forms of the Eurasian curlew. He joined the German ornithologists society in 1931 but left it in 1936 after hearing Alexander Koenig praise Adolf Hitler. In his 1936 diary he noted that the mixing of politics and science is mockery of ornithology. Stresemann invited Nagel to the 70th birthday celebrations of Oskar Heinroth which he did not attend but sent his son Erich. He held some ideas contrary to established knowledge of the period including a claim that snipe produced their drumming sound by vocal means. His artworks and writings are held in the State Archives in Bremen. Nagel recorded the nesting of lesser spotted eagles near Bremerhaven. Nagel attributed much of the decline in birdlife to the raising of the Trupe Dike, the construction of highways and the draining of wetlands. Nagel died in Berlin at the home of his son. His paintings were exhibited in 1997.
