= Stuart Nagel =

American academic

Stuart S. Nagel
- Born: August 29, 1934; Chicago, Illinois, United States
- Died: November 18, 2001 (aged 67)
- Education: Northwestern University

Stuart S. Nagel (August 29, 1934 – November 18, 2001) was an American academic. A Professor Emeritus of Political Science at the University of Illinois at Urbana–Champaign, he is notable for having coined the terms "super-optimizing" and "win-win analysis" and advancing the boundaries of policy studies.

== Early life and education ==
Nagel grew up in West Rogers Park, a neighborhood of Chicago, Illinois. Nagel attended Senn High School and Central YMCA High School in Chicago.

He completed his undergraduate and graduate studies at Northwestern University, receiving a law degree in 1958 and a Ph.D. in political science in 1961.

== Death and legacy ==
After Nagel's death at age 67, the Policy Studies Journal published, in 2003, a series of articles about Nagel's personal and academic life, entitled "Symposium in Honor of Stuart S. Nagel".

== See also ==
- List of Northwestern University alumni
- List of people from Chicago
- List of University of Illinois at Urbana–Champaign people
