= Nagl =

Nagl is a surname. Notable people with the surname include:

- Franz Xaver Nagl (1855–1913), Catholic cardinal
- John Nagl (born 1966), US Army lieutenant colonel
- Max Nagl (born 1987), German motorcycle racer
- Miriam Nagl (born 1981), Brazilian golfer
- Siegfried Nagl (born 1963), Austrian politician

== See also ==
- Nagel (surname)
- Nagle
- National Anti-Gambling League (NAGL)
