= Naegelen =

Naegelen is an Alsatian surname. As such, it is of German origin.

== List of people with the surname ==
- Christophe Naegelen (born 1983), French politician
- Denis Naegelen (born 1952), French tennis player
- Marcel-Edmond Naegelen (1892–1978), French politician

== See also ==
- Naegle
