= James Nagle =

James Nagle may refer to:

- James Nagle (general) (1822–1866), officer in the United States Army in the Mexican War and the Civil War
- James L. Nagle (1937–2021), American architect
- James Nagle (hurler) (born 1990), Irish hurler
- James F. Nagle (1927–2019), American politician in the New York State Assembly
