= Fernand Boden =

Luxembourgish politician

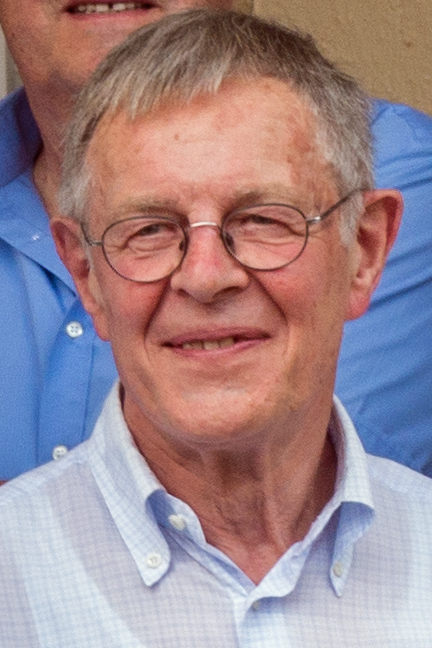
- Boden in 2023

Member of the Chamber of Deputies
- In office 28 July 2009 – 6 October 2013
- Constituency: East
- In office February 1978 – May 1979
- Constituency: East

Minister of Agriculture Minister of Housing
- In office 26 January 1995 – 23 July 2009
- Prime Minister: Jean-Claude Juncker
- Preceded by: Marie-Josée Jacobs (Agriculture); Jean Spautz (Housing)
- Succeeded by: Romain Schneider (Agriculture); Marco Schank (Housing)

Minister of Tourism
- In office 16 July 1979 – 23 July 2009
- Prime Minister: Pierre Werner; Jacques Santer; Jean-Claude Juncker
- Preceded by: Marcel Mart
- Succeeded by: Françoise Hetto-Gaasch

Minister of Education
- In office 16 July 1979 – 14 July 1989
- Prime Minister: Pierre Werner; Jacques Santer
- Preceded by: Robert Krieps
- Succeeded by: Marc Fischbach

Personal details
- Born: 13 September 1943 (age 82) Echternach, Luxembourg

Fernand Boden (born 13 September 1943) is a retired Luxembourgish politician of the Christian Social People's Party. He was a minister in the government of Luxembourg from 1979 to 2009.

Boden was born in Echternach. He studied Mathematics and Physics at the University of Liège, and between 1966 and 1978 he taught at Echternach grammar school. He served as deputy mayor of Echternach from 1970 to 1976 and was a member of the local council.

He first became a member of the Chamber of Deputies of Luxembourg from the Eastern Constituency in 1978; he was re-elected in 1979. He joined the government in 1979 as Minister of National Education and Youth and Minister of Tourism, holding those portfolios until 1989. In the latter year he was moved to the posts of Minister for Family and Solidarity and Minister of the Middle Classes and Tourism, and in 1994 he became Minister for the Civil Service. He served in the latter position until 26 January 1995, when he became Minister of Agriculture, Viticulture and Rural Development and Minister for the Middle Classes, Tourism, and Housing. He retained those portfolios for over 14 years, until being replaced in July 2009.
