= Paul C. Nagel =

Paul Nagel
- Born: August 14, 1926; Independence, Missouri
- Died: May 22, 2011 (aged 84); Edina, Minnesota
- Education: University of Minnesota (Ph.D.)
- Occupations: Historian, academic
- Spouse: Joan Peterson Nagel
- Writing career
- Language: English
- Subject: American history

Paul Chester Nagel (August 14, 1926 – May 22, 2011) was an American historian and biographer who was best known for his works for general readers on the Adams and Lee political families, and who also wrote on the history of his home state of Missouri.

== Early life ==
Nagel was born in 1926 and raised in Independence, Missouri, and attended William Chrisman High School. His family was of German ancestry, as Nagel documented in his 2002 book The German Migration to Missouri: My Family's Story. He attended the University of Minnesota, originally to study mortuary science. Shortly after his arrival, he changed his major to history. He stayed at the University of Minnesota to earn his bachelor's degree, master's degree, and Ph.D., all in history. While there, he met Joan Peterson, a librarian who worked at the university library. They married in 1948, and remained married until her death in 2010.

== Career ==
Nagel held a variety of academic positions, both in teaching and administration. After teaching history for a number of years at the University of Kentucky, he eventually became dean of that school's College of Arts and Sciences. From 1969 to 1980, he held a tenured chair and was the vice president for academic affairs for the University of Missouri and taught an influential seminar on the Adams Family through MU's highly rated Department of History. Additionally, he had a teaching position at the University of Georgia, and was a visiting professor at Vanderbilt University and at Amherst College.

In 1980, Nagel became the director of the Virginia Historical Society, and in 1985 he left that position to spend his time writing works of history and biography for a general readership.

=== Adams family scholarship ===
Nagel was particularly known for his three books on the Adams political family of Massachusetts. While teaching at the University of Georgia, Nagel was a neighbor of former U.S. Secretary of State Dean Rusk. Years later in a 1998 Booknotes interview, he recalled "And Mr. Rusk said to me, when he learned I was going to write about the Adamses--he said, 'There is no question John Quincy Adams is by far our greatest secretary of state.'" As part of his initial research on the Adams family, Nagel purchased copies of many of the papers of John Quincy Adams, and other Adams family members from the Massachusetts Historical Society. These documents were contained in 608 rolls of microfilm, and Nagel kept these in his possession until he completed his 1997 biography of John Quincy Adams, at which time he donated them to the Carleton College library. As he described it in his 1998 Booknotes interview:

They've all been filmed, to the great--well, th--to the benefit of the manuscripts, of course, and to the benefit of scholars. It's one of the reasons I decided to write about the Adamses, is because it could be marvelously convenient. You had all of this unbelievably revealing material actually in your home if you wanted to buy 608 reels of film... ...I was fortunate. I had helped the Massachu--Massachusetts Historical Society and they gave me a--a price I couldn't turn down... ...my wife and I hauled the 608 reels from university to university. And then when I gave up university life to write, we continued to have them. And just--when finishing this book, which is, I think, my last utterance on the Adamses, we gave them to--well, we gave them to Carleton College in Minnesota because they do such a great job in training undergraduates in history.

He went on to comment that he had read all of the documents contained in the 608 reels more than once, and said "I think I'm the only person in the United--in the world who has had the tenacity to do that."

== Later life and death ==
In 1992, Nagel returned to Minneapolis, where he and his wife Joan lived for the remainder of their lives. Joan Nagel died in 2010, and Paul Nagel died in 2011 of pancreatic cancer. Later in 2011, the University of Minnesota Libraries created the Paul and Joan Nagel Lectures in their honor.

== Bibliography ==
Title	Year	Publisher	Subject matter
One Nation Indivisible: The Union in American Thought 1776-1861	1964	Oxford University Press	
This Sacred Trust: American Nationality, 1798-1898	1971	Oxford University Press	
Missouri: A History	1977	W. W. Norton & Co.	History of Missouri
Descent from Glory: Four Generations of the John Adams Family	1983	Oxford University Press	Adams political family
The Adams Women: Abigail and Louisa Adams, Their Sisters and Daughters	1987	Oxford University Press	Abigail Adams, Louisa Adams
The Lees of Virginia: Seven Generations of an American Family	1990	Oxford University Press	Lee family
John Quincy Adams: A Public Life, A Private Life	1997	Knopf	John Quincy Adams
The German Migration to Missouri: My Family's Story	2002	Kansas City Star Books	
George Caleb Bingham: Missouri's Famed Painter and Forgotten Politician	2005	University of Missouri Press	George Caleb Bingham
