= Octavie Modert =

Luxembourgish politician (born 1966)

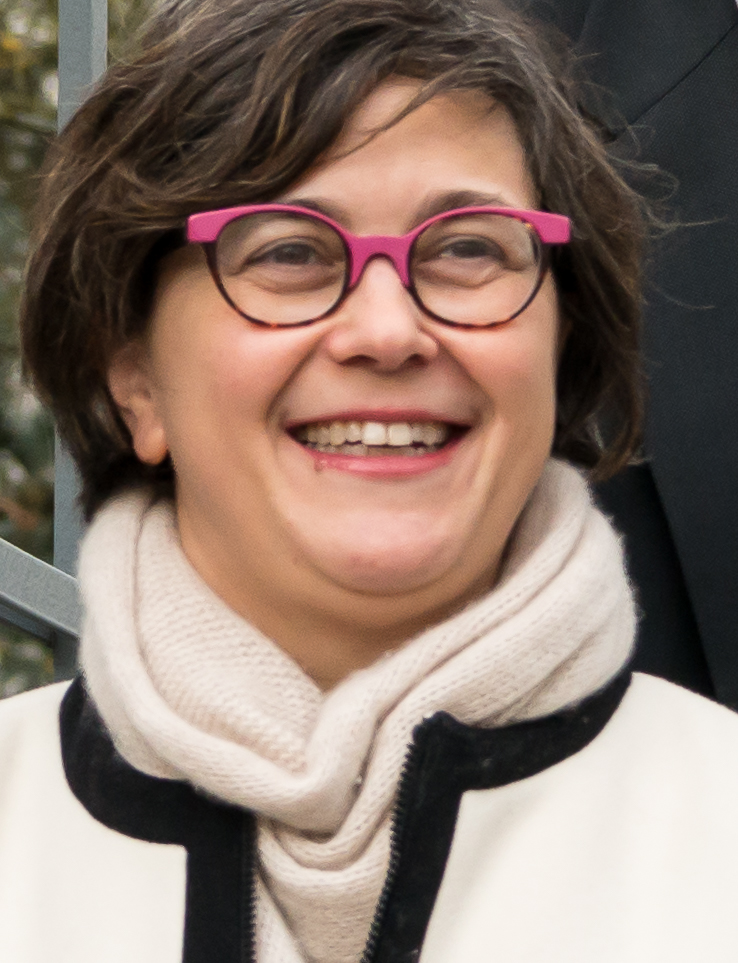
Modert in 2016

Octavie Modert (born 15 November 1966) is a Luxembourgish politician of the Christian Social People's Party.

She was born in Grevenmacher, and she studied in Strasbourg and Reading.

In 2004, she was elected to the Chamber of Deputies. She became Secretary of State for Relations with Parliament, Secretary of State for Agriculture, Viticulture and Rural Development, and Secretary of State for Culture, Higher Education and Research during the same year. She was the youngest member of the 2004 Government.
