= Maggy Nagel =

Luxembourgish politician

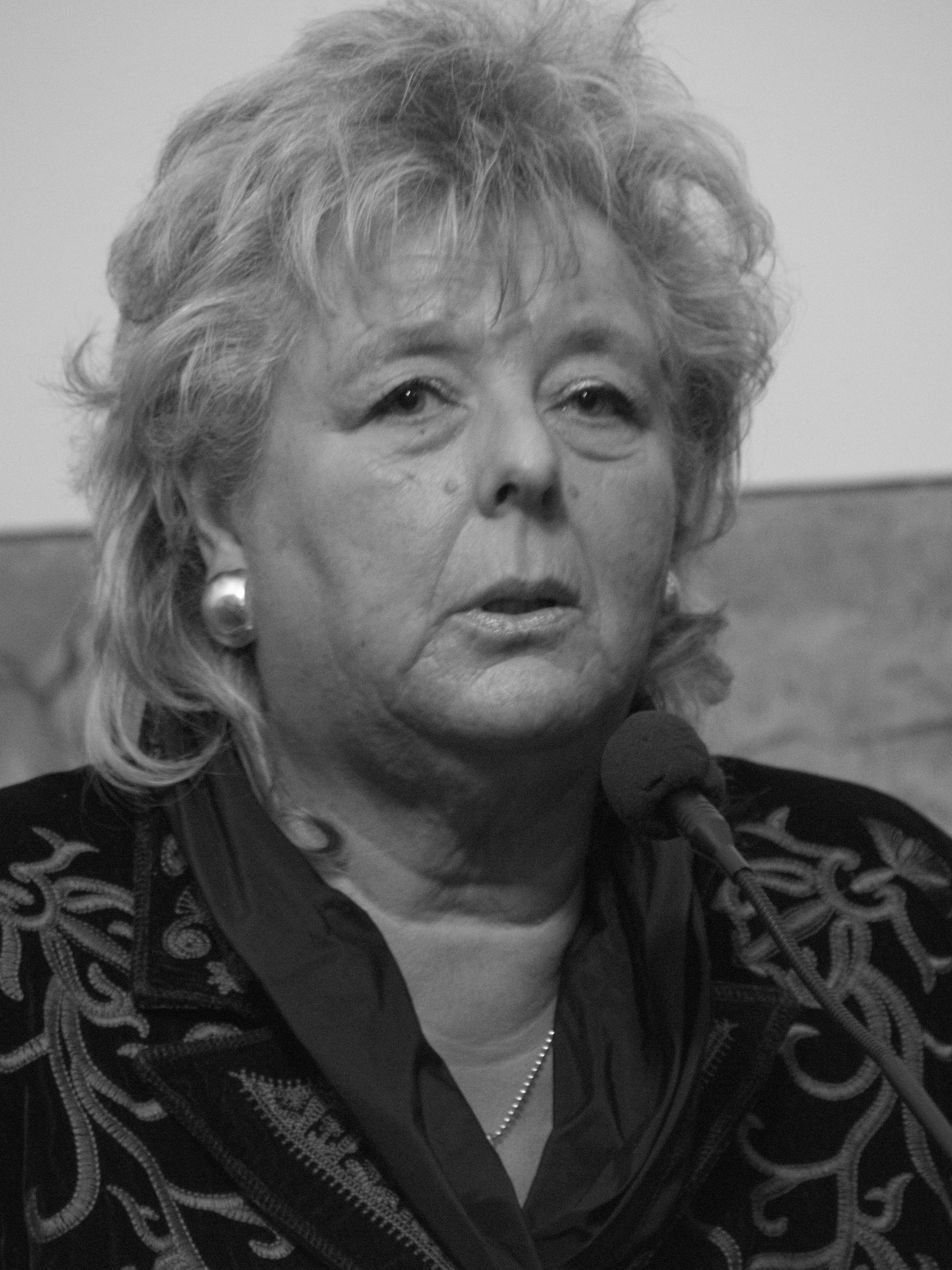
Maggy Nagel, October 2015.

Maggy Nagel (born 25 August 1957) is a Luxembourgish politician in the Democratic Party. From 2013 until December 2015 she was the Minister for Housing and the Minister for Culture.

She was born on 25 August 1957 in Luxembourg City.

She attended secondary school at the École privée Fieldgen from 1969 to 1977.

She became a member of the Democratic Party in 1996, and was an alderman of the commune of Mondorf-les-Bains from 1994 to 1996, then mayor from 1996 to 2013.

She was elected to the Chamber of Deputies for the first time on the DP's list in the Est constituency in 1999. She was the vice-president of the commission for equal opportunities between men and women from 2000 to 2004. She was re-elected in 2013. After the elections of 20 October 2013, Nagel joined the three-party coalition government as Minister for Culture and Minister for Housing on 4 December 2013.

From January 2013 to November 2015, she was the vice-president of the DP.

From 2000 to 2012, Nagel was the vice-president of the National Tourism Office.
