= List of female government ministers of Luxembourg =

Wikimedia list article

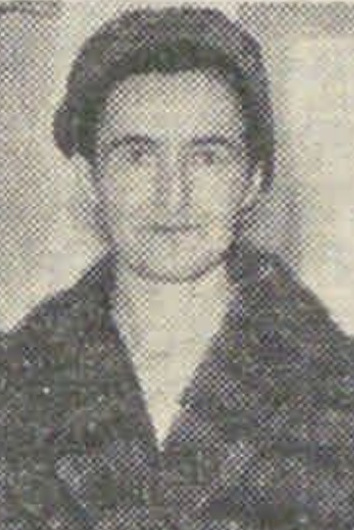
Madeleine Frieden-Kinnen, who became the first woman to serve in a Luxembourgish government in 1967

As of 2026, fifteen women have served as ministers in the Government of Luxembourg. While women's suffrage was introduced to the country in 1919, and Marguerite Thomas-Clement, the first female member of the Chamber of Deputies, was elected that year, it took until 1967 for a woman to hold a ministerial position, as Madeleine Frieden-Kinnen was appointed as a secretary of state in the Werner-Cravatte Government.

After Frieden-Kinnen's resignation in 1972, the next female minister was Colette Flesch, who had until then served as the first female Mayor of Luxembourg City, and who became the first female deputy prime minister in 1980. While no woman has ever served as prime minister, three women, including Flesch, have served as deputy prime minister.

== List of women ministers ==
Numerical order represents the order of first appointment to the cabinet.
Age represents age on appointment to that office.

Denotes incumbent minister

#	Name	Portrait	Office	Party	Appointed	Left office	Age	Prime minister
1	Madeleine Frieden-Kinnen (1915–1999)	Madeleine Frieden-Kinnen	Secretary of State for Family, Youth, Population, Social Solidarity and National Education	CSV	3 March 1967	1 February 1969	51	Pierre Werner
1	Madeleine Frieden-Kinnen (1915–1999)	Madeleine Frieden-Kinnen	Minister for Family, Youth, Social Solidarity and Public Health	CSV	1 February 1969	19 September 1972	53	Pierre Werner
1	Madeleine Frieden-Kinnen (1915–1999)	Madeleine Frieden-Kinnen	Minister for Cultural and Religious Affairs	CSV	1 February 1969	19 September 1972	53	Pierre Werner
2	Colette Flesch (1937–2026)	Colette Flesch	Deputy Prime Minister	DP	22 November 1980	20 July 1984	43	Pierre Werner
2	Colette Flesch (1937–2026)	Colette Flesch	Minister for Foreign Affairs, External Trade and Cooperation	DP	22 November 1980	20 July 1984	43	Pierre Werner
2	Colette Flesch (1937–2026)	Colette Flesch	Minister for the Economy and the Middle Class	DP	22 November 1980	20 July 1984	43	Pierre Werner
2	Colette Flesch (1937–2026)	Colette Flesch	Minister for Justice	DP	22 November 1980	20 July 1984	43	Pierre Werner
3	Mady Delvaux-Stehres (born 1950)	Mady Delvaux-Stehres	Secretary of State for Health	LSAP	14 July 1989	13 July 1994	38	Jacques Santer
3	Mady Delvaux-Stehres (born 1950)	Mady Delvaux-Stehres	Secretary of State for Social Security	LSAP	14 July 1989	13 July 1994	38	Jacques Santer
3	Mady Delvaux-Stehres (born 1950)	Mady Delvaux-Stehres	Secretary of State for Physical Education and Sports	LSAP	14 July 1989	13 July 1994	38	Jacques Santer
3	Mady Delvaux-Stehres (born 1950)	Mady Delvaux-Stehres	Secretary of State for Youth	LSAP	14 July 1989	13 July 1994	38	Jacques Santer
3	Mady Delvaux-Stehres (born 1950)	Mady Delvaux-Stehres	Minister for Social Security	LSAP	13 July 1994	7 August 1999	43	Jean-Claude Juncker
3	Mady Delvaux-Stehres (born 1950)	Mady Delvaux-Stehres	Minister for Transport	LSAP	13 July 1994	7 August 1999	43	Jean-Claude Juncker
3	Mady Delvaux-Stehres (born 1950)	Mady Delvaux-Stehres	Minister for Communication	LSAP	13 July 1994	7 August 1999	43	Jean-Claude Juncker
3	Mady Delvaux-Stehres (born 1950)	Mady Delvaux-Stehres	Minister for National Education and Vocational Training	LSAP	31 July 2004	4 December 2013	53	Jean-Claude Juncker
4	Marie-Josée Jacobs (born 1950)	Marie-Josée Jacobs	Minister for Agriculture, Viticulture and Rural Development	CSV	9 December 1992	26 January 1995	42	Jacques Santer
4	Marie-Josée Jacobs (born 1950)	Marie-Josée Jacobs	Minister Delegate for Cultural Affairs	CSV	9 December 1992	26 January 1995	42	Jacques Santer
4	Marie-Josée Jacobs (born 1950)	Marie-Josée Jacobs	Minister for Family	CSV	26 January 1995	7 August 1999	45	Jean-Claude Juncker
4	Marie-Josée Jacobs (born 1950)	Marie-Josée Jacobs	Minister for the Handicapped	CSV	26 January 1995	7 August 1999	45	Jean-Claude Juncker
4	Marie-Josée Jacobs (born 1950)	Marie-Josée Jacobs	Minister for the Promotion of Women	CSV	26 January 1995	31 July 2004	45	Jean-Claude Juncker
4	Marie-Josée Jacobs (born 1950)	Marie-Josée Jacobs	Minister for Family, Social Solidarity and Youth	CSV	7 August 1999	31 July 2004	49	Jean-Claude Juncker
4	Marie-Josée Jacobs (born 1950)	Marie-Josée Jacobs	Minister for Equal Chances	CSV	31 July 2004	23 July 2009	54	Jean-Claude Juncker
4	Marie-Josée Jacobs (born 1950)	Marie-Josée Jacobs	Minister for Family and Integration	CSV	31 July 2004	30 April 2013	54	Jean-Claude Juncker
4	Marie-Josée Jacobs (born 1950)	Marie-Josée Jacobs	Minister for Cooperation and Humanitarian Action	CSV	23 July 2009	30 April 2013	59	Jean-Claude Juncker
5	Erna Hennicot-Schoepges (born 1941)	Erna Hennicot-Schoepges	Minister for National Education and Vocational Training	CSV	26 January 1995	7 August 1999	53	Jean-Claude Juncker
5	Erna Hennicot-Schoepges (born 1941)	Erna Hennicot-Schoepges	Minister for Culture	CSV	26 January 1995	7 August 1999	53	Jean-Claude Juncker
5	Erna Hennicot-Schoepges (born 1941)	Erna Hennicot-Schoepges	Minister for Religious Affairs	CSV	26 January 1995	7 August 1999	53	Jean-Claude Juncker
5	Erna Hennicot-Schoepges (born 1941)	Erna Hennicot-Schoepges	Minister for Culture, Higher Education and Research	CSV	7 August 1999	31 July 2004	58	Jean-Claude Juncker
5	Erna Hennicot-Schoepges (born 1941)	Erna Hennicot-Schoepges	Minister for Public Works	CSV	7 August 1999	31 July 2004	58	Jean-Claude Juncker
6	Lydie Err (born 1949)		Secretary of State for Foreign Affairs, External Trade and Cooperation	LSAP	30 January 1998	7 August 1999	48	Jean-Claude Juncker
6	Lydie Err (born 1949)		Secretary of State for Public Works	LSAP	30 January 1998	7 August 1999	48	Jean-Claude Juncker
7=	Lydie Polfer (born 1952)	Lydie Polfer	Deputy Prime Minister	DP	7 August 1999	19 July 2004	46	Jean-Claude Juncker
7=	Lydie Polfer (born 1952)	Lydie Polfer	Minister for Foreign Affairs and External Trade	DP	7 August 1999	19 July 2004	46	Jean-Claude Juncker
7=	Lydie Polfer (born 1952)	Lydie Polfer	Minister for Public Service and Administrative Reform	DP	7 August 1999	19 July 2004	46	Jean-Claude Juncker
7=	Anne Brasseur (born 1950)	Anne Brasseur	Minister for National Education, Vocational Training and Sports	DP	7 August 1999	31 July 2004	49	Jean-Claude Juncker
8	Octavie Modert (born 1966)	Octavie Modert	Secretary of State for Relations with Parliament	CSV	31 July 2004	23 July 2009	37	Jean-Claude Juncker
8	Octavie Modert (born 1966)	Octavie Modert	Secretary of State for Agriculture, Viticulture and Rural Development	CSV	31 July 2004	23 July 2009	37	Jean-Claude Juncker
8	Octavie Modert (born 1966)	Octavie Modert	Secretary of State for Culture, Higher Education and Research	CSV	31 July 2004	23 July 2009	37	Jean-Claude Juncker
8	Octavie Modert (born 1966)	Octavie Modert	Minister for Relations with Parliament	CSV	23 July 2009	30 April 2013	42	Jean-Claude Juncker
8	Octavie Modert (born 1966)	Octavie Modert	Minister for Culture	CSV	23 July 2009	4 December 2013	42	Jean-Claude Juncker
8	Octavie Modert (born 1966)	Octavie Modert	Minister Delegate for Administrative Simplification	CSV	23 July 2009	4 December 2013	42	Jean-Claude Juncker
8	Octavie Modert (born 1966)	Octavie Modert	Minister Delegate for Public Service and Administrative Reform	CSV	23 July 2009	4 December 2013	42	Jean-Claude Juncker
8	Octavie Modert (born 1966)	Octavie Modert	Minister for Justice	CSV	30 April 2013	4 December 2013	46	Jean-Claude Juncker
9	Françoise Hetto-Gaasch (born 1966)	Françoise Hetto-Gaasch	Minister for the Middle Class and Tourism	CSV	23 July 2009	4 December 2013	49	Jean-Claude Juncker
9	Françoise Hetto-Gaasch (born 1966)	Françoise Hetto-Gaasch	Minister for Equal Chances	CSV	23 July 2009	4 December 2013	49	Jean-Claude Juncker
10	Martine Hansen (born 1965)	Martine Hansen	Minister for Higher Education and Research	CSV	30 April 2013	4 December 2013	47	Jean-Claude Juncker
10	Martine Hansen (born 1965)	Martine Hansen	Minister for Agriculture, Food and Viticulture	CSV	17 November 2023	Incumbent	57	Luc Frieden
10	Martine Hansen (born 1965)	Martine Hansen	Minister for Consumer Protection	CSV	17 November 2023	Incumbent	57	Luc Frieden
10	Martine Hansen (born 1965)	Martine Hansen	Minister for Sports	CSV	11 December 2025	Incumbent	60	Luc Frieden
11=	Maggy Nagel (born 1957)	Maggy Nagel	Minister for Culture	DP	4 December 2013	18 December 2015	56	Xavier Bettel
11=	Maggy Nagel (born 1957)	Maggy Nagel	Minister for Housing	DP	4 December 2013	18 December 2015	56	Xavier Bettel
11=	Lydia Mutsch (born 1961)	Lydia Mutsch	Minister for Health	LSAP	4 December 2013	5 December 2018	52	Xavier Bettel
11=	Lydia Mutsch (born 1961)	Lydia Mutsch	Minister for Equal Chances	LSAP	4 December 2013	5 December 2018	52	Xavier Bettel
11=	Corinne Cahen (born 1973)	Corinne Cahen	Minister for Family and Integration	DP	4 December 2013	15 June 2023	40	Xavier Bettel
11=	Corinne Cahen (born 1973)	Corinne Cahen	Minister for the Greater Region	DP	4 December 2013	15 June 2023	40	Xavier Bettel
11=	Carole Dieschbourg (born 1973)	Carole Dieschbourg	Minister for the Environment	DG	4 December 2013	5 December 2018	36	Xavier Bettel
11=	Carole Dieschbourg (born 1973)	Carole Dieschbourg	Minister for the Environment, Climate and Sustainable Development	DG	5 December 2018	22 April 2022	41	Xavier Bettel
11=	Francine Closener (born 1969)	Francine Closener	Secretary of State for the Economy	LSAP	4 December 2013	5 December 2018	43	Xavier Bettel
11=	Francine Closener (born 1969)	Francine Closener	Secretary of State for Internal Security	LSAP	4 December 2013	5 December 2018	43	Xavier Bettel
11=	Francine Closener (born 1969)	Francine Closener	Secretary of State for Defence	LSAP	4 December 2013	5 December 2018	43	Xavier Bettel
12=	Paulette Lenert (born 1968)	Paulette Lenert	Minister for Cooperation and Humanitarian Action	LSAP	5 December 2018	4 February 2020	50	Xavier Bettel
12=	Paulette Lenert (born 1968)	Paulette Lenert	Minister for Consumer Protection	LSAP	5 December 2018	17 November 2023	50	Xavier Bettel
12=	Paulette Lenert (born 1968)	Paulette Lenert	Minister for Health	LSAP	4 February 2020	17 November 2023	51	Xavier Bettel
12=	Paulette Lenert (born 1968)	Paulette Lenert	Minister for Social Security	LSAP	4 February 2020	17 November 2023	51	Xavier Bettel
12=	Paulette Lenert (born 1968)	Paulette Lenert	Deputy Prime Minister	LSAP	5 January 2022	17 November 2023	53	Xavier Bettel
12=	Sam Tanson (born 1977)	Sam Tanson	Minister for Housing	DG	5 December 2018	11 October 2019	41	Xavier Bettel
12=	Sam Tanson (born 1977)	Sam Tanson	Minister for Culture	DG	5 December 2018	17 November 2023	41	Xavier Bettel
12=	Sam Tanson (born 1977)	Sam Tanson	Minister for Justice	DG	11 October 2019	17 November 2023	42	Xavier Bettel
12=	Taina Bofferding (born 1982)	Taina Bofferding	Minister for the Interior	LSAP	5 December 2018	17 November 2023	36	Xavier Bettel
12=	Taina Bofferding (born 1982)	Taina Bofferding	Minister for Equality between Men and Women	LSAP	5 December 2018	17 November 2023	36	Xavier Bettel
13	Yuriko Backes (born 1970)	Yuriko Backes	Minister for Finances	DP	5 January 2022	17 November 2023	51	Xavier Bettel
13	Yuriko Backes (born 1970)	Yuriko Backes	Minister for Mobility and Public Works	DP	17 November 2023	Incumbent	52	Luc Frieden
13	Yuriko Backes (born 1970)	Yuriko Backes	Minister for Defence	DP	17 November 2023	Incumbent	52	Luc Frieden
13	Yuriko Backes (born 1970)	Yuriko Backes	Minister for Gender Equality and Diversity	DP	17 November 2023	Incumbent	52	Luc Frieden
14	Joëlle Welfring (born 1974)	Joëlle Welfring	Minister for the Environment, Climate and Sustainable Development	DG	29 April 2022	17 November 2023	47	Xavier Bettel
15=	Martine Deprez (born 1969)	Martine Deprez	Minister for Health and Social Security	CSV	17 November 2023	Incumbent	54	Luc Frieden
15=	Stéphanie Obertin (born 1970)	Stéphanie Obertin	Minister for Digitalisation	DP	17 November 2023	Incumbent	49	Luc Frieden
15=	Stéphanie Obertin (born 1970)	Stéphanie Obertin	Minister for Research and Higher Education	DP	17 November 2023	Incumbent	49	Luc Frieden
15=	Elisabeth Margue (born 1990)	Elisabeth Margue	Minister for Justice	CSV	17 November 2023	Incumbent	33	Luc Frieden
15=	Elisabeth Margue (born 1990)	Elisabeth Margue	Minister Delegate for Media and Connectivity	CSV	17 November 2023	Incumbent	33	Luc Frieden
15=	Elisabeth Margue (born 1990)	Elisabeth Margue	Minister Delegate for Relations with Parliament	CSV	17 November 2023	Incumbent	33	Luc Frieden
