= Juncker–Asselborn I Government =

31st Government of Luxembourg from 2004 to 2009

Juncker-Asselborn I Government
- Cabinet of Luxembourg
- 2004-2009
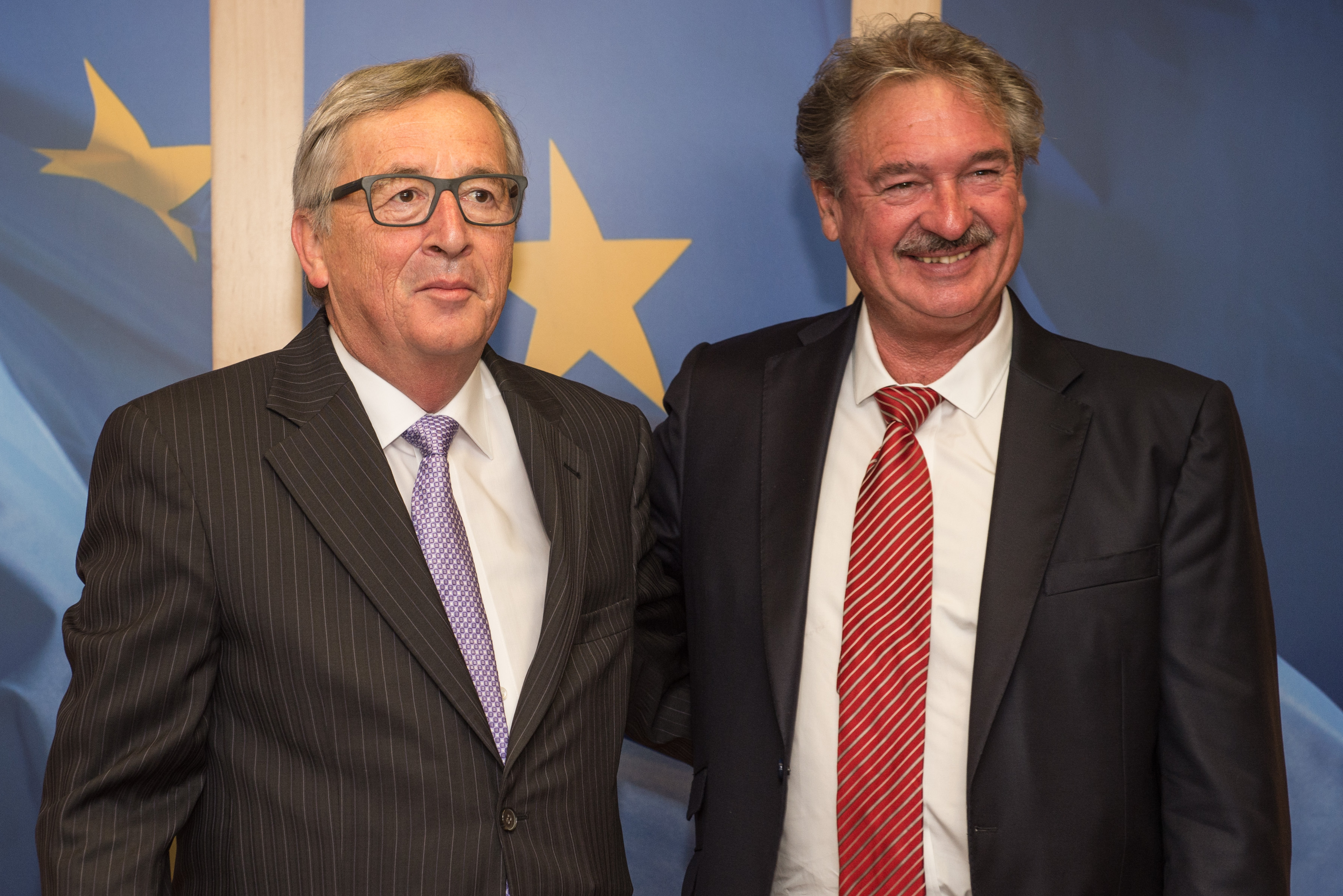
- Juncker and Asselborn in 2015.
- Date formed: 31 July 2004
- Date dissolved: 23 July 2009 (4 years, 11 months, 3 weeks and 2 days)

People and organisations
- Grand Duke: Henri
- Prime Minister: Jean-Claude Juncker
- Deputy Prime Minister: Jean Asselborn
- Total no. of members: 15
- Member parties: CSV; LSAP
- Status in legislature: Centre-left to centre-right coalition government
- Opposition parties: DP; ADR; Greens
- Opposition leader: Henri Grethen (Note: De facto leader of the opposition as the leader of the largest opposition group in the Chamber of Deputes.)

History
- Election: 2004 general election
- Legislature terms: 31st Legislature of the Chamber of Deputies
- Predecessor: Juncker–Polfer Government
- Successor: Juncker–Asselborn II Government

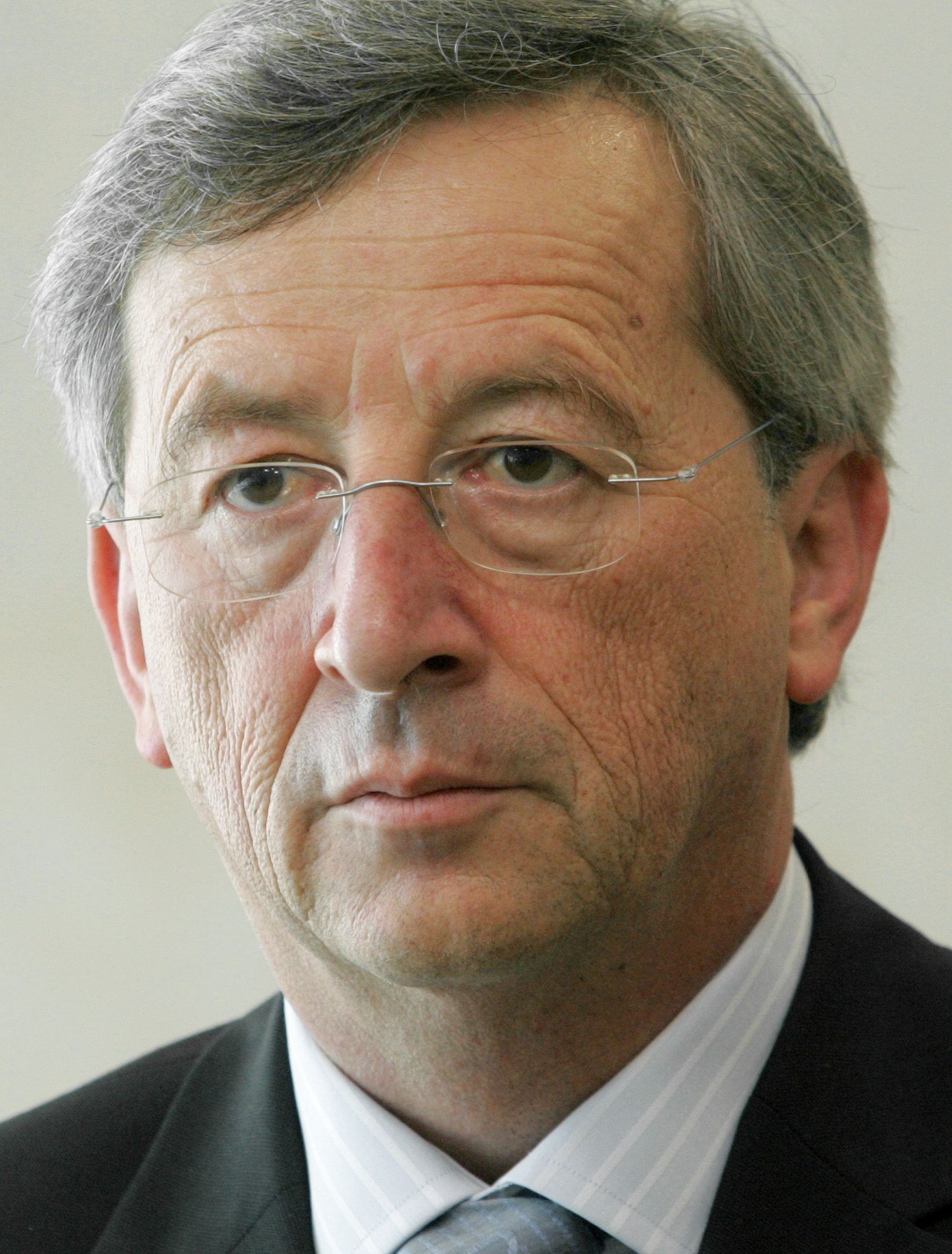
Jean-Claude Juncker, Prime Minister

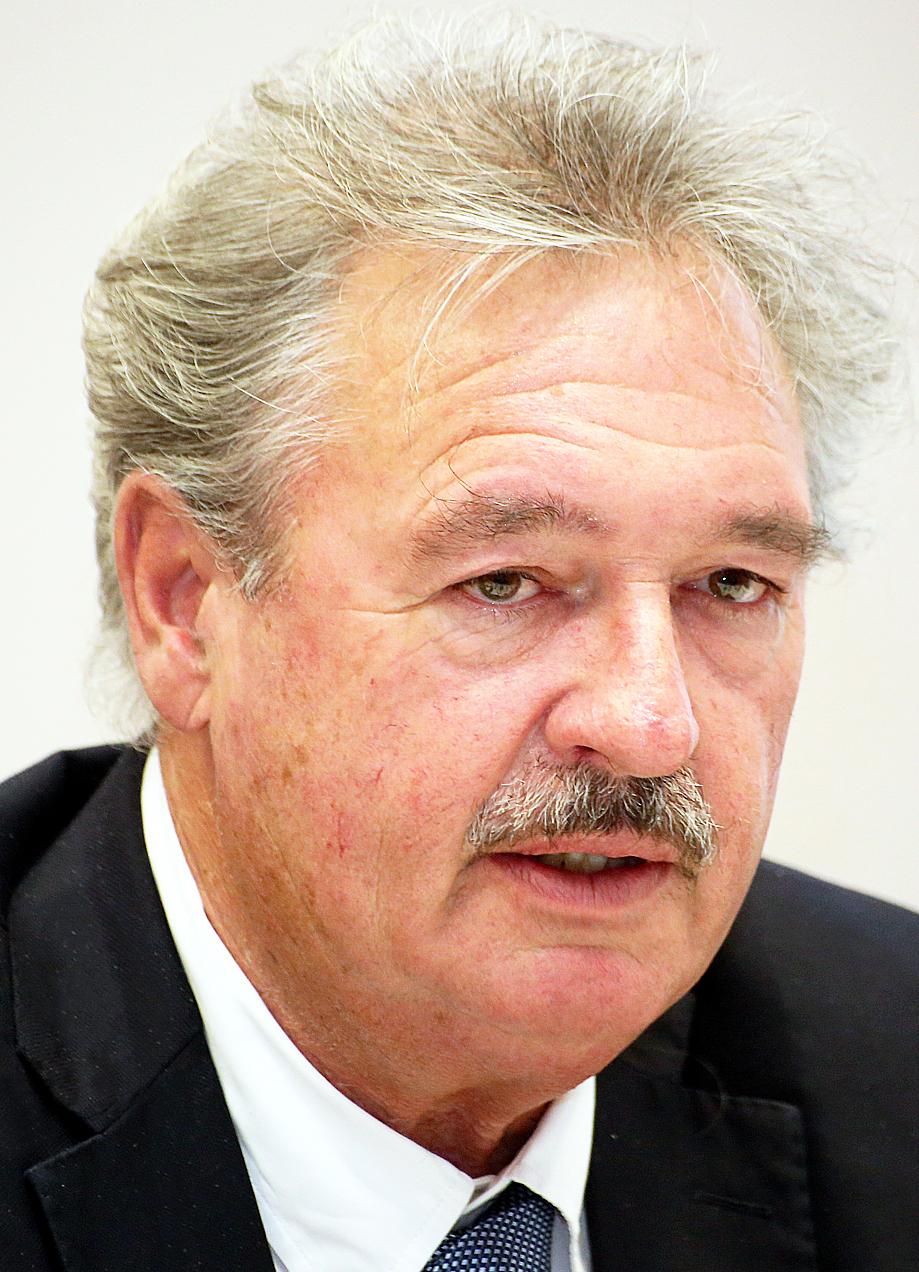
Jean Asselborn, Deputy Prime Minister

The first Juncker–Asselborn Government was the government of Luxembourg between 31 July 2004 and 23 July 2009. It was led by, and named after, Prime Minister Jean-Claude Juncker and Deputy Prime Minister Jean Asselborn.

It represented a coalition between Juncker's Christian Social People's Party (CSV) and Asselborn's Luxembourg Socialist Workers' Party (LSAP), after these had been elected the largest and second-largest parties respectively in the legislature, in the general election of 2004. Previously, the CSV had been governing in coalition with the liberal Democratic Party.

== Ministers ==
Name	Portrait	Party	Office
Jean-Claude Juncker		CSV	Prime Minister; Minister for Finances
Jean Asselborn		LSAP	Deputy Prime Minister; Minister for Foreign Affairs and Immigration
Fernand Boden		CSV	Minister for Agriculture, Viticulture, and Rural Development; Minister for the Middle Class, Tourism, and Housing
Marie-Josée Jacobs		CSV	Minister for the Family and Integration; Minister for Equal Opportunities
Mady Delvaux-Stehres		LSAP	Minister for National Education and Vocational Training
Luc Frieden		CSV	Minister for Justice; Minister for the Treasury and the Budget
François Biltgen		CSV	Minister for Work and Employment; Minister for Culture, Higher Education, and Research; Minister for Religion
Jeannot Krecké		LSAP	Minister for the Economy and Foreign Trade; Minister for Sport
Mars Di Bartolomeo		LSAP	Minister for Health and Social Security
Lucien Lux		LSAP	Minister for the Environment; Minister for Transport
Jean-Marie Halsdorf		CSV	Minister for the Interior and Planning
Claude Wiseler		CSV	Minister for the Civil Service and Administrative Reform; Minister for Public Works
Jean-Louis Schiltz		CSV	Minister for Cooperation and Humanitarian Affairs; Minister for Communications; Minister for Defence
Nicolas Schmit		LSAP	Minister-Delegate for Foreign Affairs and Immigration
Octavie Modert		CSV	Secretary of State for Relations with Parliament; Secretary of State for Agriculture, Viticulture, and Rural Development; Secretary of State for Culture, Higher Education, and Research
Source: Service Information et Presse

== Formation ==
At the elections of 13 June 2004, the two parties that had been in government since 1999 experienced different fates. The CSV emerged the winner of the election, gaining 5 more seats than its 1999 result of 19. For the first time since 1984, it managed to recover from the slow erosion of its position as the dominant party. Its coalition partner, the Democratic Party, lost a third of its seats, and was left with only 10 seats in the new Chamber of Deputies. The other winners of the election were the Greens (Déi Gréng), receiving 7 seats (up from 5 in 1999). For the first time, they were represented in parliament with members from all four constituencies. The LSAP gained one seat compared to 1999, and again became the second-largest party in the Chamber with 14 seats. However, it did not manage to return to its strong results from before 1999, having made only light gains. The ADR lost seats for the first time since its entry into parliament in 1989, and was left with 5 seats (7 in 1999). The far left, divided between the Communist Party and Déi Lénk, only received no seats.

After these results, the CSV and LSAP started coalition negotiations, which involved 15 meetings. On 31 July 2004 the new CSV-LSAP government was sworn in.

After a ministerial reshuffle on 22 February 2006, Jean-Louis Schiltz became the Minister for Defence. Luc Frieden remained in charge of Justice, the Treasury, and the Budget.

== Foreign policy ==
=== European Union ===
In his speech on the state of the nation in 2007, Jean-Claude Juncker stated that "only the European Union gives Luxembourg the means to exercise influence on events abroad; it is important for Luxembourg to influence the development of Europe". The European community remained the preferred area of operation for Luxembourgish diplomacy. Several times in the past, the Grand Duchy's political representatives had been appointed to posts of high responsibility in the Union. On 10 September 2004, the Prime Minister and Minister for Finances, Jean-Claude Juncker, was elected by his European colleagues as president of the Eurogroup, the informal group for finance ministers of the members of the Eurozone. His two-year mandate was renewed in 2006 and again in 2008. Despite being an informal organisation, the Eurogroup played an important role in coordinating the budget policies of the Eurozone member states. The function of the Eurogroup's presidency allowed Juncker to regularly join in meetings of the G7 and of the International Monetary Fund to assure a unified representation of the Eurozone within international bodies.

The Luxembourgish presidency of the Council of the European Union in the first half of 2005 constituted a highlight in the area of foreign policy. During this time, Luxembourg hosted numerous ministerial meetings and preparatory sessions. The most important advances of the Luxembourgish Presidency were the relaunch of the Lisbon Strategy and the reform of the Stability and Growth Pact. The Lisbon Strategy formulated in 2000 aimed to make the European Union the most competitive and dynamic knowledge economy of the world by 2010, which would at the same time be able to respond to the social and environmental expectations of its citizens. In 2005, it became possible to undertake a reorientation. In order to make the governments more responsible to their European partners, each member state had to submit a national programme of reform to the European Commission for the years 2005–2008.

The Luxembourgish government advocated an integrated approach aiming not only at competitiveness, but also at "an increased social cohesion and a more harmoniously balanced environment". A second large project that the Luxembourgish presidency managed to conclude with success was the reform of the Stability and Growth Pact. Adopted in 1996, this formed the cornerstone of the Economic and Monetary Union. Imposing rigorous budgetary discipline, it was to guarantee the stability of the Euro. The challenge consisted of finding a formula to allow a more relaxed application of the Pact, which would take economic realities into account without at the same time allowing budgetary laissez-faire. The requirement to keep the deficit under 3% and public debt under 60% of GDP was maintained. The reform which came into force in late July 2005 allowed the member states to escape a too restrictive deficit policy in the case of a recession and after examining a certain number of "pertinent factors".

==== Constitution ====
European politics during the period was marked by efforts to achieve a reorganisation of the institutional architecture of the Union, made necessary by the successive enlargements. On 29 October 2004 in Rome, Luxembourgish representatives signed the Treaty establishing a Constitution for Europe. This treaty should have come into force in 2006 after being ratified by all signatory states, which ended up not taking place. Several countries, including Luxembourg, decided to ratify it through a national referendum. While the Luxembourgish electors voted with 56,52% in favour of the Constitution in the referendum on 10 July 2005, France and the Netherlands rejected it. To remedy this failure, an intergovernmental meeting prepared a new agreement, the Treaty of Lisbon, which was signed on 13 December 2007 by the 27 member states of the EU. On 29 May 2008, the Chamber of Deputies ratified the simplified text without a new referendum.

=== Promotion abroad ===
Apart from European affairs, an important part of foreign policy consisted of the promotion of Luxembourgish industries and the financial centre abroad. The Luxembourgish government increased the number of economic missions especially in Asian countries (China, India, Japan, South Korea, Vietnam, United Arab Emirates, Jordan, Saudi Arabia, Dubai, Turkey, Kuwait, Qatar), but also in North and South America (United States, Canada, Mexico, Peru) and some European countries (Russia, Sweden, Finland). The goal of these visits was to make itself known in these regions with high potential for growth and to support Luxembourgish businesses in their search for new markets. In order to encourage efforts to internationalise the Luxembourgish economy, the government created in 2007 two promotion agencies: Luxembourg for Business and Luxembourg for Finance.

=== OECD Grey list ===
After the 2008 financial crisis, international pressure on countries which continued to practise banking secrecy grew. Luxembourg, like Switzerland or Austria, was also blamed. The Grand Duchy appeared on a "grey list" established by the Organisation for Economic Co-operation and Development (OECD). The Luxembourgish government protested against being likened to a tax haven and undertook efforts to counter the image of the financial centre. On 13 March 2009, Luxembourg decided to conform to the standards of the OECD and committed itself to the exchange of information on demand in the framework of bilateral accords with third parties. In several months, the Luxembourgish government signed twenty agreements of non-double taxation which implemented the rules of the OECD. On 8 July 2009, Luxembourg was the first financial centre to be removed from the "grey list" of the OECD.

== Domestic policy ==
=== Economy ===
Under the previous government, between 2001 and 2004, Luxembourg had experienced a slowdown in its economy. The year 2005 again marked a return to growth: the GDP reached a growth rate of 4% in 2005 and 6,2% in 2006. However, the unemployment rate remained fairly high, between 4 and 5%, despite the creation of 21,000 new jobs in 2005 and 2006. Moreover, Luxembourg experienced higher inflation than most other Eurozone members, which threatened a loss of Luxembourg's competitiveness compared with its principal trading partners, even though Luxembourg in 2007 was still ranked the 5th most competitive economy in the EU. In addition, despite the economic bright spell, the Luxembourgish government remained restrained in its forecasts. It endeavoured to consolidate the public finances and to slow the increase in expenditure. Indeed, while until 2001, the budget had regularly showed a surplus, in 2005 the deficit reached 1,9% of the GDP.

The government proclaimed its intention to return to a balanced budget, especially as tax receipts depended largely on the economic situation, which itself depended on the performance of the financial sector.

=== Financial sector ===
The financial centre remained the engine of growth. However, its legal framework was subject to adjustments. On 1 January 2006, a law came into force introducing a withholding tax in full discharge on revenue from savings. That same year, the European Commission decided that holding companies that were exempt on the basis of the law of 1929 were in receipt of a state aid that was incompatible with the common market. The Luxembourgish government agreed to repeal this tax regime in return for a four-year transition period, The 2008 financial crisis also had repercussions in Luxembourg. Like other European states, the Luxembourgish state was compelled to intervene to rescue its banks and support the economy. The funds awarded in 2008 to the financial sector represented 7,64% of GDP, including 2,5 billion Euros in acquisitions of shares and 300 million Euros of guarantees. In March 2009, the government formulated a plan to support the economy, in order to combat the effects of the crisis.

=== Competitivity ===
The government had not however awaited the crisis to begin a reflection on the structural strengths and weaknesses of Luxembourg. Commissioned by the previous coalition, professor Lionel Fontagné of the University of Paris I presented a report in November 2004 on Luxembourg's competitivity, entitled A crack in the steel (Une paille dans l’acier). The conclusions of this analysis fed in to the work of the Tripartite Coordination Committee which included the government and the social partners. The Tripartite managed to agree on the structural determinants of competitivity, namely education and innovation. Public and private efforts would increase spending on research and development. A national action plan was to allow the country to reach the Lisbon goals. The government increased its commitments to finance the activities of the University of Luxembourg, set up in 2003. In 2006, a multi-year contract was signed between the State and the university, providing the latter with long-term planning security.

=== Pay, pensions and social security ===
Within the Tripartite, opinions continued to differ on pensions funding, the automatic indexation of pay (the index) and the minimum wage. Nevertheless, the index, combined with the sudden rise in oil prices, was seen as the main cause of inflation. The social partners agreed on an adaptation of the index. Discussions within the Tripartite prepared the way for another important structural reform: the introduction of a single status for employees, which put an end to the outdated distinction between workers and private employees. The harmonisation of statuses made it possible to merge the health insurance and pension funds of the private sector and led to the creation of one single professional chamber and one employment tribunal for the sector. From 1 January 2009, the National Health Fund (Caisse nationale de santé) replaced the old social security bodies that were based on socio-professional distinctions.

=== Education ===
The debates on competitivity brought up the importance of education again. The government encouraged initiatives which went beyond the practices of traditional teaching and which represented innovative projects: the "Neie Lycée", a pilot school based on cooperation and themed projects; "Eis Schoul", a research primary school based on inclusive teaching methods; the "École de la 2e chance" (School of the Second Chance) for school-leavers; and a cross-border school, the Deutsch-Luxemburgisches Schengen-Lyzeum Perl. In 2007, the government submitted three bills which would replace the education law of 1912. Learning was now defined in terms of competences to be acquired, and the age of mandatory schooling was raised to the age of 16.

A significant social measure was also the introduction from 1 March 2009 of a system of vouchers which gave the right to a range of educative extracurricular services (daycare centres, crèches, etc.). This was a first step towards at least partly free provision of these services

=== Infrastructure ===
The modernisation and development of infrastructure continued to be a priority for government policy. The level of public investment remained high, independent of economic fluctuations. Several large projects, started under previous governments, were completed: the Grande-Duchesse Joséphine-Charlotte Concert Hall (Philharmonie) and the "Centre de musiques amplifiées" (Rockhal) in 2005, the Grand Duke Jean Museum of Modern Art (MUDAM) in 2006, a new terminal for Luxembourg Findel Airport and the Judiciary City in 2008. In the area of communications and transport, there were also several promising achievements. From March 2007, the Luxembourg-Perpignan rolling road offered an alternative to road transport. From June 2007, the LGV Est linked Luxembourg to Paris, reducing travel time by a third. The Luxembourgish state had participated in the funding of this high-speed line.

In terms of land-use planning, the masterplan IVL, adopted in 2003, determined the fundamental direction. It was gradually complemented by regional masterplans and sectoral masterplans. The government was convinced of the need for adopting a cross-border vision of the dynamics which animated the Luxembourgish territory. It chose land-use planning as the main theme of its presidency of the Greater Region in 2008 and 2009. The aim was to develop, in tandem with the entities in the Greater Region, an integrated strategy of spatial development in the areas of transport, business parks and housing. In the longer term, the government's aim was the creation of a cross-border decentralised metropolitan region.

The search for a greater internal cohesion was also at the heart of the organisation "Luxembourg et Grande Région, capitale européenne de la culture 2007" (Luxembourg and the Greater Region, European Capital of Culture 2007). By encouraging projects of long-term cross-border cooperation, this cultural event was able to strengthen the common feeling of belonging among the 11 million inhabitants of the Greater Region.

=== Social policy ===
In the area of social policy, several large-scale reforms were carried out. From 1 January 2009, a new law on nationality came into force. Fostering the integration of foreign residents in Luxembourg, it made it possible to adopt dual nationality, while raising the period of obligatory residency from 5 to 7 years. The Luxembourgish language was recognised as an essential factor of integration. Applicants had to pass a language exam and attend civic education classes.

The initiative for another important social reform came from two Deputies, Lydie Err (LSAP) and Jean Huss (The Greens), who had already presented a bill on the right to die with dignity in 2002. In 2006, the government drafted a bill on palliative care and support for people at the end of their life. it decided to have it discussed along with the Err/Huss bill. The two bills were passed by the Chamber of Deputies in 2008, in the course of two votes. Notably, the parliament avoided the traditional divide between government majority and opposition by exempting the Deputies from voting discipline. However, the Grand Duke indicated to the Prime Minister that he was not able to "sanction" any law on the right to die with dignity, invoking a conflict of conscience. In order to avoid an institutional crisis, while leaving the head of state his right to freedom of opinion and of conscience, the country's political authorities undertook a revision of the Constitution. From now on, the Grand Duke promulgated laws in his capacity as head of the executive, but no longer had to sanction them as part of the legislative branch. The law on euthanasia and assisted suicide was finally promulgated on 16 March 2009.

== See also ==
- List of members of the Chamber of Deputies of Luxembourg 2004–09
