= List of mayors of Pétange =

This is list of Mayors of Pétange, a commune in south-western Luxembourg.

== List of Mayors of Pétange ==
Name	Start	End
Jean-Henry Reichling	1844	1848
François Thill Senior	1848	1854
Pierre Tockert	1854	1858
Jean Kauffmann	1858	1861
Pierre Kirpach	1861	1873
François Thill Junior	1873	1891
Jean Thill	1891	1906
Jean Waxweiler	1906	1918
Mathias Heinen	1918	1921
Jean-Pierre Kirchen	1921	1922
Marcel Schintgen	1925	1934
Pierre Hamer	1935	1945
Joseph Philippart	1946	1962
Théophile Kirsch	1962	1978
Armand Kaiser	1979	1987
René Putzeys	1988	1993
Roger Klein	1994	1999
Jean-Marie Halsdorf	2000	2004
Pierre Mellina	2004	2023
Jean-Marie Halsdorf	2023	present
