= Ministry of Sustainable Development and Infrastructure =

The Ministry of Sustainable Development and Infrastructure (French: Ministère du Développement durable et des Infrastructures) (German: Ministerium für nachhaltige Entwicklung und Infrastruktur) was a ministry of the Government of Luxembourg. Its head office was in the City of Luxembourg.

It was created on 23 July 2009 as the product of a merger between the positions of Ministry for the Environment, Ministry for Public Works, and Ministry for Transport. The Bettel I Government changed the composition and leadership. While still one ministry, it had two ministers: François Bausch for Sustainable Development and Infrastructure and Carole Dieschbourg for the Environment. Additionally, Camille Gira acted as Secretary of State for Sustainable Development and Infrastructure. The portfolio of Water resource management with its respective administration, formerly under the Interior Ministry, became part of the ministry.

In 2018, the ministry was renamed Ministry of Mobility and Public Works, the Ministry of the Environment became a standalone ministry again, called Ministry of Environment, Climate and Sustainable Development, and while the Department of Spatial Planning became part of the new Ministry of Energy and Spatial Planning.

== Departments (2009 – 2013) ==
The ministry included several departments:

- Department of the Environment (formerly Ministry of the Environment)
- Public Works Department
- Department of Spatial Planning
- Department of Transport

The Public Procurement Directorate within the Public Works Department is responsible for the regulatory framework for public procurement, drafting relevant legislation and monitoring its implementation, and also for representing the Luxembourgish authorities in the field of public procurement.

== Departments (2013 – 2018) ==
During the Bettel I government, the ministry was organized as following:

- Minister for Sustainable Development and Infrastructure
  - Department of Transport
  - Public Works Department
  - Department of Spatial Planning
- Minister for the Environment
  - Department of the Environnement
  - Department of Water resource management

== List of Ministers ==
Minister		Party	Start date	End date	Prime Minister
	Claude Wiseler	CSV	23 July 2009	4 December 2013	Jean-Claude Juncker
	François Bausch (Sustainable Development and Infrastructure)	DG	4 December 2013	5 December 2018	Xavier Bettel
Informal Meeting Transport & Environment (26329187982) cropped Dieschbourg	Carole Dieschbourg (Environment)	DG	4 December 2013	5 December 2018	Xavier Bettel
