= LFB (disambiguation) =

LFB may refer to:

- London Fire Brigade, the fire and rescue service for London
- L. Frank Baum, author of The Wizard of Oz
- Lachlan Fold Belt, a geological feature in Australia
- Laissez Faire Books, a bookseller in New York
- Lausanne–Fribourg–Bern Railway, a Swiss railway company
- Leaf-Footed Bugs, a large group of insects from the family Coreidae
- Liga Femenina de Baloncesto, the Spanish women's basketball league
- Ligue féminine de basket, French women's basketball league
- Lillesand–Flaksvand Line, a railway line in Norway
- Louisiana Farm Bureau Federation
- Luxembourg for Business, trade promotion body of the Luxembourg government
- Luxol fast blue stain, a stain used in biology
- Line Fill Buffer, part of a CPU Cache for assembling a cache line after a cache miss
- Lycée Français de Bakou, a French international school in Baku, Azerbaijan
- Lycée Français de Bali, a French international school in Bali, Indonesia
- Lycée Français de Barcelone or the Liceo Francés de Barcelona, a French international school in Barcelona, Spain
- French Lycée in Brussels (Lycée Français Jean Monnet de Bruxelles), a French school in Belgium
- Gustave Eiffel French School of Budapest (Lycée Français de Budapest), a French international school in Budapest, Hungary
