= Pierre Mellina =

Luxembourgish politician and former athlete (born 1957)

Mayor of Pétange
- In office 2004–2023
- Preceded by: Jean-Marie Halsdorf
- Succeeded by: Jean-Marie Halsdorf

Personal details
- Born: 25 February 1957 (age 69) Pétange
- Party: Christian Social People's Party

Pierre Mellina (born 25 February 1957) is a Luxembourgish politician and retired track and field athlete.

== Political office ==
He was the Mayor of Pétange, a commune in the far south-west of the country, standing for the Christian Social People's Party (CSV). He was previously a member of the communal council (1994 – 99) and an échevin (2000 – 04) in Pétange.

== Sporting achievements ==
In the early 1980s, Mellina was one of Luxembourg's foremost long-distance runners, winning the Luxembourgish national championships in the 5,000 (1981, 1982) and the 10,000 metres (1982). He won the Eurocross cross country competition in Diekirch in 1981.
