= Juncker–Asselborn II Government =

32nd Government of Luxembourg from 2009 to 2013

Juncker-Asselborn II Government
- Cabinet of Luxembourg
- 2009-2013
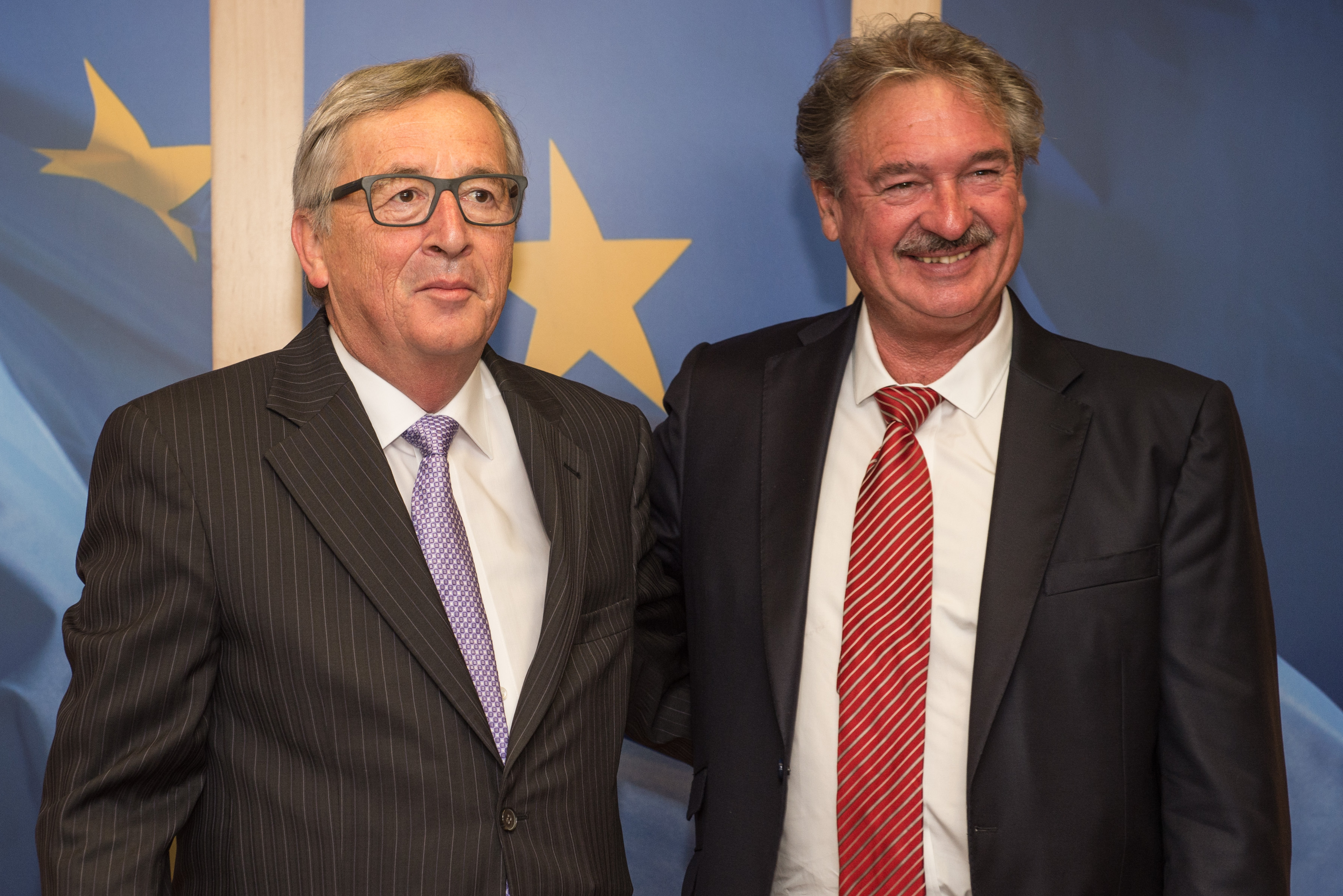
- Date formed: 23 July 2009
- Date dissolved: 11 July 2013 (3 years, 11 months, 2 weeks and 4 days)

People and organisations
- Grand Duke: Henri
- Prime Minister: Jean-Claude Juncker
- Deputy Prime Minister: Jean Asselborn
- Total no. of members: 15
- Member parties: CSV; LSAP
- Status in legislature: Centre-left to centre-right coalition government
- Opposition parties: DP; Greens; ADR; The Left
- Opposition leader: Xavier Bettel (Note: De facto leader of the opposition as the leader of the largest opposition group in the Chamber of Deputes.)

History
- Election: 2009 general election
- Legislature terms: 32nd Legislature of the Chamber of Deputies
- Predecessor: Juncker-Asselborn I Government
- Successor: Bettel I Government

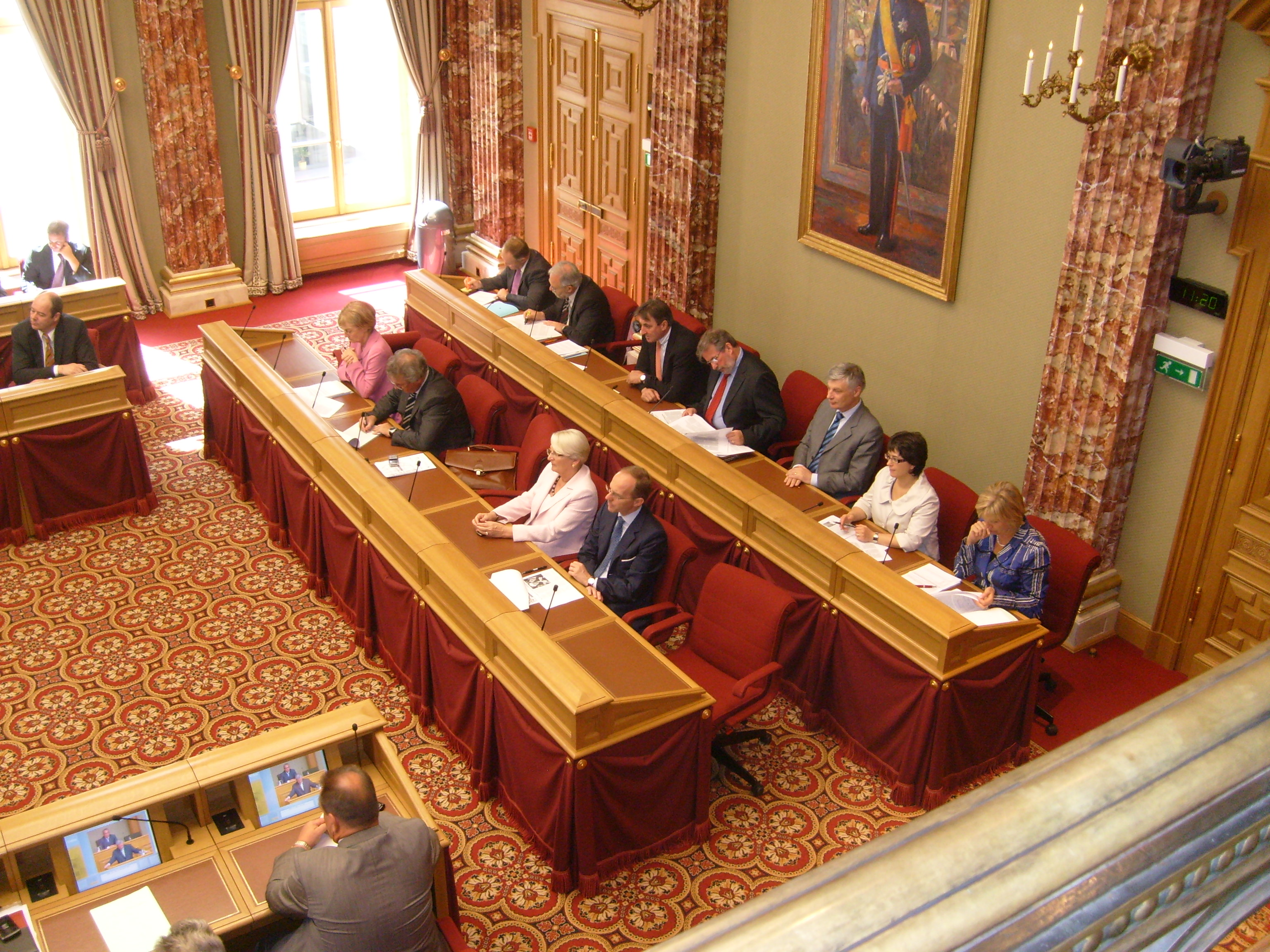
The government in the chamber

The Juncker–Asselborn II Government was the government of Luxembourg between 23 July 2009 and 11 July 2013. It was led by, and named after, Prime Minister Jean-Claude Juncker and Deputy Prime Minister Jean Asselborn. It was formed on 23 July 2009, after the 2009 election to the Chamber of Deputies. It fell after the withdrawal of the Luxembourg Socialist Workers' Party from the government; Prime Minister Juncker submitted his resignation to the Grand Duke on 11 July 2013, and a snap election was called.

== Formation ==
The Christian Social People's Party (CSV) emerged the winner of the election of 7 June 2009. It received 38,04 % of the votes and 26 seats, its best result since 1959. Its coalition partner, the Luxembourg Socialist Workers' Party (LSAP), lost one seat and was left with 13 members in the new Chamber of Deputies, but remained the second-strongest party in terms of seats. The Democratic Party, which had already experienced loses at the previous elections in 2004, was left with only 9 seats, (down from 10 in 2004 and 15 in 1999). The Greens repeated their positive results from 2004 and received 7 seats. The ADR, which in April 2006 had changed its name from Aktiounskomitee fir Demokratie a Rentegerechtegkeet to Alternativ Demokratesch Reformpartei, did not managed to increase its voter base and only received 4 seats, down from 5 in 2004. On the other hand, the Left, having been absent from the parliament in 2004-2009, was again represented by one Deputy. The two other parties registered at the elections, the Communist Party and the "Citizens' List" (Biergerlëscht), received no seats. After the elections, the CSV started coalition talks with the LSAP to form a "government of continuity and responsibility". The coalition agreement was signed on 20 July and three days later the new government was sworn in at Berg Castle.

== Ministers ==
Name	Portrait	Party	Office
Jean-Claude Juncker		CSV	Prime Minister; Minister for the Treasury
Jean Asselborn		LSAP	Deputy Prime Minister; Minister for Foreign Affairs
Marie-Josée Jacobs		CSV	Minister for the Family and Integration; Minister for Cooperation and Humanitarian Action
Mady Delvaux-Stehres		LSAP	Minister for National Education and Vocational Training
Luc Frieden		CSV	Minister for Finances
François Biltgen		CSV	Minister for Justice; Minister for the Civil Service and Administrative Reform; Minister for Higher Education and Research; Minister for Communications and the Media; Minister for Religion
Jeannot Krecké (until 1 February 2012); Etienne Schneider		LSAP	Minister for the Economy and Foreign Trade
Mars Di Bartolomeo		LSAP	Minister for Health; Minister for Social Security
Jean-Marie Halsdorf		CSV	Minister for the Interior and Grand Region of Luxembourg; Minister for Defence
Claude Wiseler		CSV	Minister for Sustainable Development and Infrastructure
Nicolas Schmit		LSAP	Minister for Labour, Employment and Immigration
Octavie Modert		CSV	Minister for Culture; Minister for Relations with Parliament; Minister for Administrative Simplification under the Prime Minister; Minister-Delegate for the Civil Service and Administrative Reform
Marco Schank		CSV	Minister for Housing; Minister-Delegate for Sustainable Development and Infrastructure
Françoise Hetto-Gaasch		CSV	Minister for the Middle Class and Tourism; Minister for Equality of Opportunity
Romain Schneider		LSAP	Minister for Agriculture, Viticulture, and Rural Development; Minister for Sport; Minister-Delegate for Economic Solidarity
Source: Service Information et Presse

== See also ==
- List of members of the Chamber of Deputies of Luxembourg 2009–13
