= List of ministers for communications and the media of Luxembourg =

The minister for communications and the media (French: ministre des communications et des médias) is a position in the Luxembourgish government. Among other competences, the minister for communications is responsible for overseeing the regulation of mail and of radio and television broadcasting and the apportionment of the radio spectrum.

Until 23 July 2009, the position was known as 'Minister for Communications' (French: Ministre des Communications).

== List of ministers for communications and the media ==
Minister	Party	Start date	End date	Prime Minister
Alex Bodry	LSAP	14 July 1989	13 July 1994	Jacques Santer
Mady Delvaux-Stehres	LSAP	13 July 1994	26 January 1995	Jacques Santer
Mady Delvaux-Stehres	LSAP	26 January 1995	7 August 1999	Jean-Claude Juncker
François Biltgen (first time)	CSV	7 August 1999	31 July 2004	Jean-Claude Juncker
Jean-Louis Schiltz	CSV	31 July 2004	23 July 2009	Jean-Claude Juncker
François Biltgen (second time)	CSV	23 July 2009	30 April 2013	Jean-Claude Juncker
Luc Frieden	CSV	30 April 2013	4 December 2013	Jean-Claude Juncker
Xavier Bettel	DP	4 December 2013	17 November 2023	Himself
Elisabeth Margue	CSV	17 November 2023	Incumbent	Luc Frieden
