= Claude Wiseler =

President of the Chamber of Deputies of Luxembourg since 2023

The Honourable Claude Wiseler
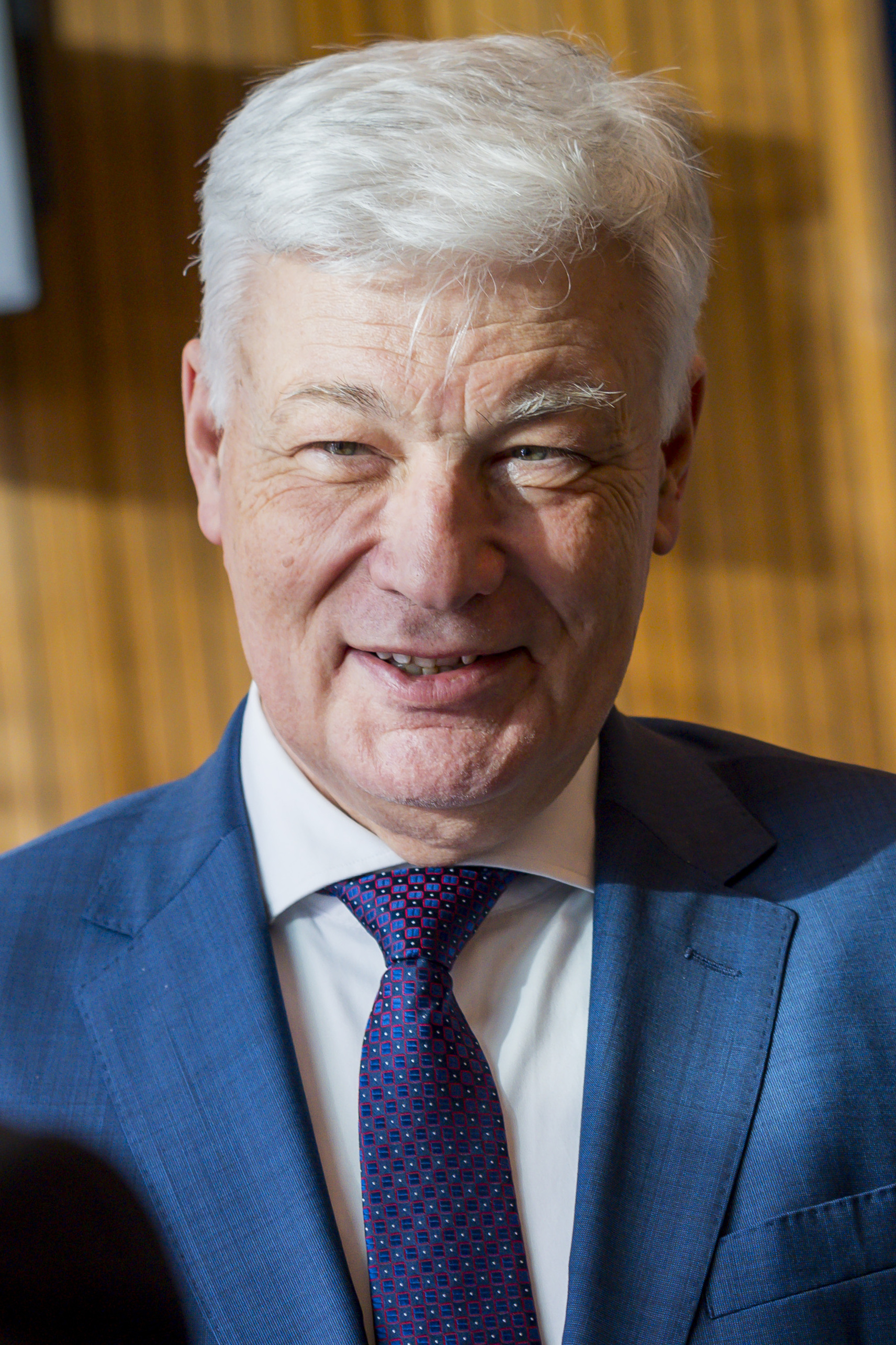
- Wiseler in 2025

President of the Chamber of Deputies
- Incumbent
- Assumed office 21 November 2023
- Monarchs: Henri; Guillaume V
- Vice President: Fernand Etgen (2023-2025); Mars Di Bartolomeo; Michel Wolter; André Bauler
- Preceded by: Fernand Etgen

Member of the Chamber of Deputies
- Incumbent
- Assumed office 5 December 2013
- Constituency: Centre
- In office 13 July 1999 – 30 July 2004
- Constituency: Centre

President of the Christian Social People's Party
- In office 24 April 2021 – 27 November 2023
- Preceded by: Frank Engel
- Succeeded by: Elisabeth Margue

Minister of Sustainable Development and Infrastructure
- In office 23 July 2009 – 4 December 2013
- Prime Minister: Jean-Claude Juncker
- Preceded by: Fernand Boden (Rural development)
- Succeeded by: François Bausch

Minister of Civil Service, Administrative Reform and Public Works
- In office 31 July 2004 – 23 July 2009
- Prime Minister: Jean-Claude Juncker
- Preceded by: Lydie Polfer (Public service and Administrative reform); Erna Hennicot-Schoepges (Public works)
- Succeeded by: François Biltgen

Personal details
- Born: 30 January 1960 (age 66) Luxembourg City, Luxembourg
- Party: Christian Social People's Party
- Spouse: Isabel Wiseler-Santos Lima
- Children: 3
- Education: Athénée de Luxembourg; Sorbonne Nouvelle University
- Profession: Professor; Politician
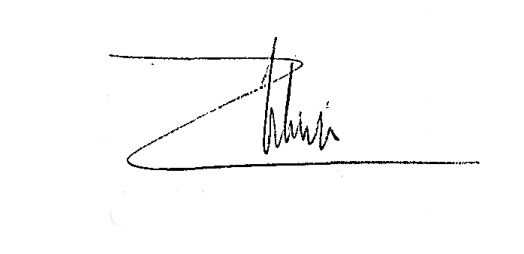
- Signature

Claude Wiseler (born 30 January 1960) is a Luxembourgish politician, serving as president of the Chamber of Deputies since 2023. A member of the Christian Social People's Party (CSV), of which he was President from 2021 to 2023, he previously served as a minister in the Juncker–Asselborn I and II governments from 2004 to 2013, and was the CSV's candidate for Prime Minister in the 2018 general election.

He attended the Athénée de Luxembourg, before studying literature in Paris. He returned to the Athénée to teach language in 1983, which he continued to do until 1988. From 1987 to 1999, he served as an adviser to the government on educational issues. He became General Secretary of the Christian Social People's Party in 1995.

He was elected to the Chamber of Deputies in the 1999 election, finishing sixth amongst CSV candidates in the Centre constituency, where six CSV deputies were elected. In the communal elections of October 1999, Wiseler was elected to Luxembourg City's communal council in third-place amongst CSV candidates (six were elected); he was appointed as an échevin in the DP-CSV administration, and served in this position from 1 January 2000 until 30 July 2004.

He was comfortably re-elected to the Chamber of Deputies in the 2004 election, placing second amongst CSV candidates in a CSV landslide victory, and appointed to the new cabinet to hold the positions of Minister for the Civil Service and Administrative Reform and Minister for Public Works. After the 2009 election, Wiseler was reappointed to the government in the enlarged role of Minister for Sustainable Development and Infrastructure, which included his former portfolio of Public Works.

Wiseler was elected President of the CSV in 2021, receiving 400 votes from 475 members of the party's national congress.

He is married to fellow CSV politician and Member of the European Parliament Isabel Wiseler-Santos Lima.

== Footnotes ==
Political offices
Preceded by Erna Hennicot-Schoepges	Minister for Public Works; 2004 – 2009	Merged into new position
New title Created through merger	Minister for Sustainable Development and Infrastructure; 2009 – 2013	Succeeded by François Bausch
Preceded by Fernand Etgen	President of the Chamber of Deputies; 2023-present	Incumbent
Party political offices
Preceded by Camille Dimmer	General Secretary of the CSV; 1995 – 2000	Succeeded by Jean-Louis Schiltz
