= Josée Lorsché =

Luxembourgish politician (born 1961)

- Official portrait, 2026

Member of the Chamber of Deputies
- Incumbent
- Assumed office 13 October 2026
- Preceded by: Joëlle Welfring
- Constituency: South
- In office 6 July 2011 – 24 October 2023
- Preceded by: Jean Huss
- Constituency: South

Personal details
- Born: 9 September 1961 (age 65) Dudelange
- Party: Déi Gréng

Josée Lorsché (born 9 September 1961) is a Luxembourgish politician and a member of the Greens. She has been a member of the Chamber of Deputies since 2011, with an interruption between 2023 and 2026, and was the president of the Green group in the Chamber from 2018 to 2023.

== Career ==
Lorsché is a primary school teacher by profession. She was an activist in the anti-nuclear movement during the 1980s, joining the Greens in 1984. She was elected to the communal council of Bettembourg in 2005 and has been an alderman since 2011.

Lorsché entered the Chamber of Deputies in 2011, succeeding Jean Huss who resigned having been a deputy for 23 years. She was re-elected in the 2013 and 2018 general elections. Lorsché was president of the Greens group in the Chamber from 2018 to 2023.

Since 2018, Lorsché has been a member of the Benelux Parliament (as part of the SGD/SVD grouping) and the Assemblée parlementaire de la Francophonie. She has been a member of the Parliamentary Assembly of the Council of Europe since 2019, first as a substitute and, from 2020, as a full representative. She is part of the Socialists, Democrats and Greens Group.

Lorsché was a lead candidate in Bettembourg for the 2023 local elections alongside Nicolas Hirsch.

Amidst a decline in the Greens' vote share, she was not re-elected to the Chamber in the 2023 general election. Nevertheless, she once again became an MP on 13 October 2026, replacing Joëlle Welfring after the latter's appointment to the European Investment Bank.

== Personal life ==
Lorsché is married and has two daughters. She lives in Noertzange in the commune of Bettembourg.

== See also ==
- List of members of the Chamber of Deputies of Luxembourg 2018–2023
