= Germaine Simon =

Luxembourgish physician and writer

Germaine Simon (27 February 1921 – 9 April 2012) was a Luxembourgish physician and writer, remembered for her historical novel Lucilinburhuc.

== Biography ==
Born in Paris, Simon attended primary school in Pétange in the south of Luxembourg. After matriculating from the Lycée de jeunes filles in Luxembourg City in 1940, she began to study medicine in Bonn but in 1942 was forced to work for the Reichsarbeitsdienst in Buckow. In 1943, she continued her studies in Tübingen before spending further periods of study in both Berlin and Paris. After graduating in tropical medicine in Paris, she spent a short period in the United States before taking up employment at the Dudelange Hospital in Luxembourg. Until 1995, she practised as a general practitioner in Pétange.

In 1994, Simon completed her novel tracing the history of Luxembourg from the Stone Age to the present: Lucilinburhuc. Steinzeit bis Neuzeit. It was republished in 2009.

== Works ==
- 1989: Schicksal einer Ärztin : 1940-1988 : novel. - Luxembourg : Sankt-Paulus-Druckerei, 279 pp
- 1990: Der fliegende Arzt : und andere Märchen = Le médecin volant : et d'autres contes, short stories written and translated by Germaine Simon; illustrated by Roger Bour. - [S.l.] : G. Simon, Luxembourg, Impr. Saint-Paul, 96 pp
- 1992: In den Ardennen (1943-1944) : und andere Novellen, short stories. - Christnach : Ed. Émile Borschette, 1992, Luxembourg, impr. Worré-Mertens, 149 pp
- 1994: Lucilinburhuc: Steinzeit bis Neuzeit, historical novel, [S.l.] : G. Simon, 1994, Luxembourg, Sankt-Paulus-Druckerei, 455 pp
