= Joëlle Welfring =

Luxembourgish politician (born 1974)

The Honourable Joëlle Welfring
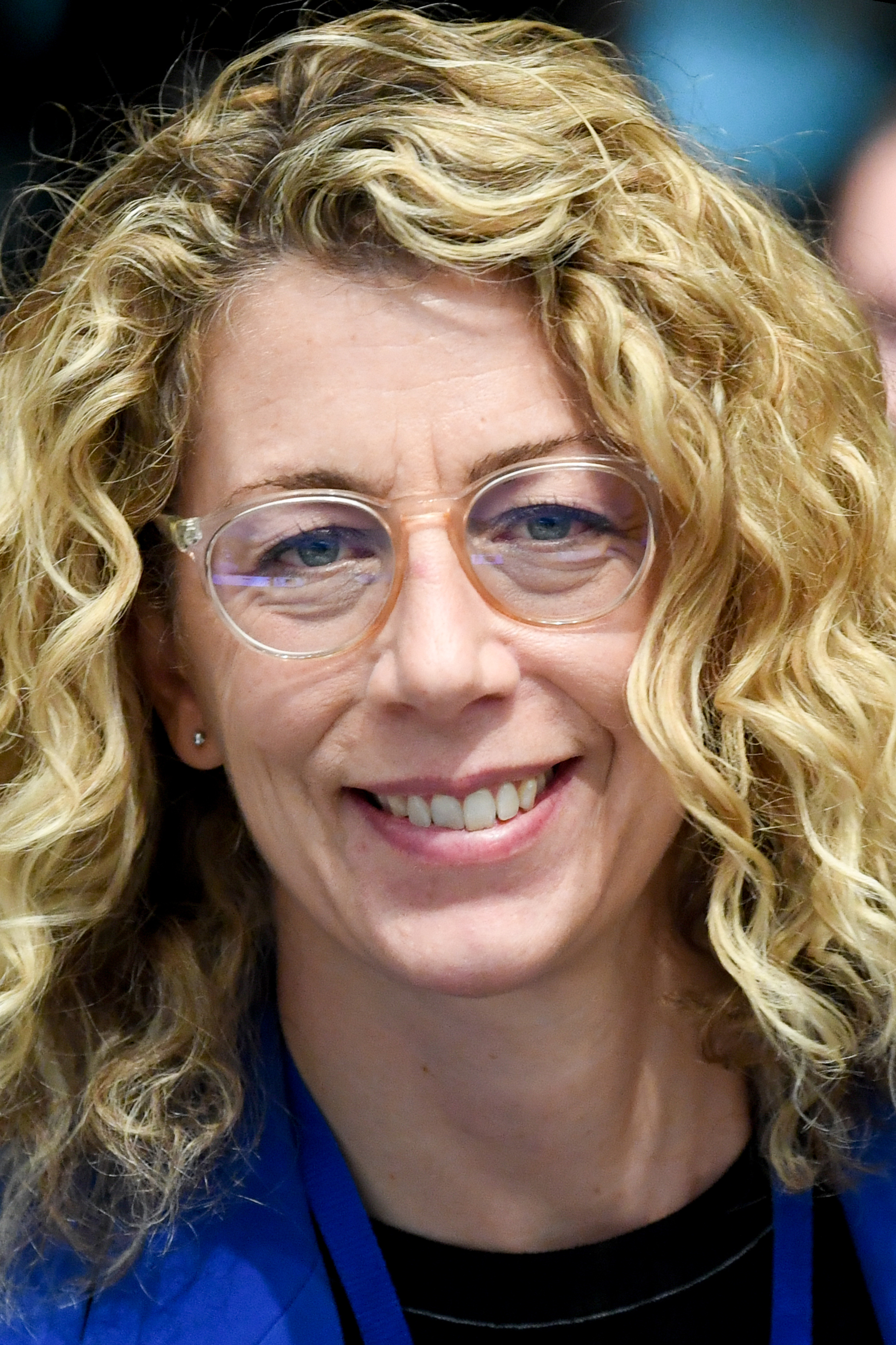
- Welfring in 2022

Member of the Chamber of Deputies
- In office 21 November 2023 – 30 September 2026
- Succeeded by: Josée Lorsché
- Constituency: South

Minister for the Environment, Climate and Sustainable Development
- In office 29 April 2022 – 17 November 2023
- Prime Minister: Xavier Bettel
- Government: Bettel II
- Preceded by: Carole Dieschbourg
- Succeeded by: Serge Wilmes

Personal details
- Born: 22 June 1974 (age 52) Esch-sur-Alzette, Luxembourg
- Party: The Greens

Joëlle Welfring (born 22 June 1974) is a Luxembourgish politician. A member of The Greens, she served as a member of the Chamber of Deputies for the South from 2023 to 2026.
