= Jean-Louis Schiltz =

Luxembourgish lawyer

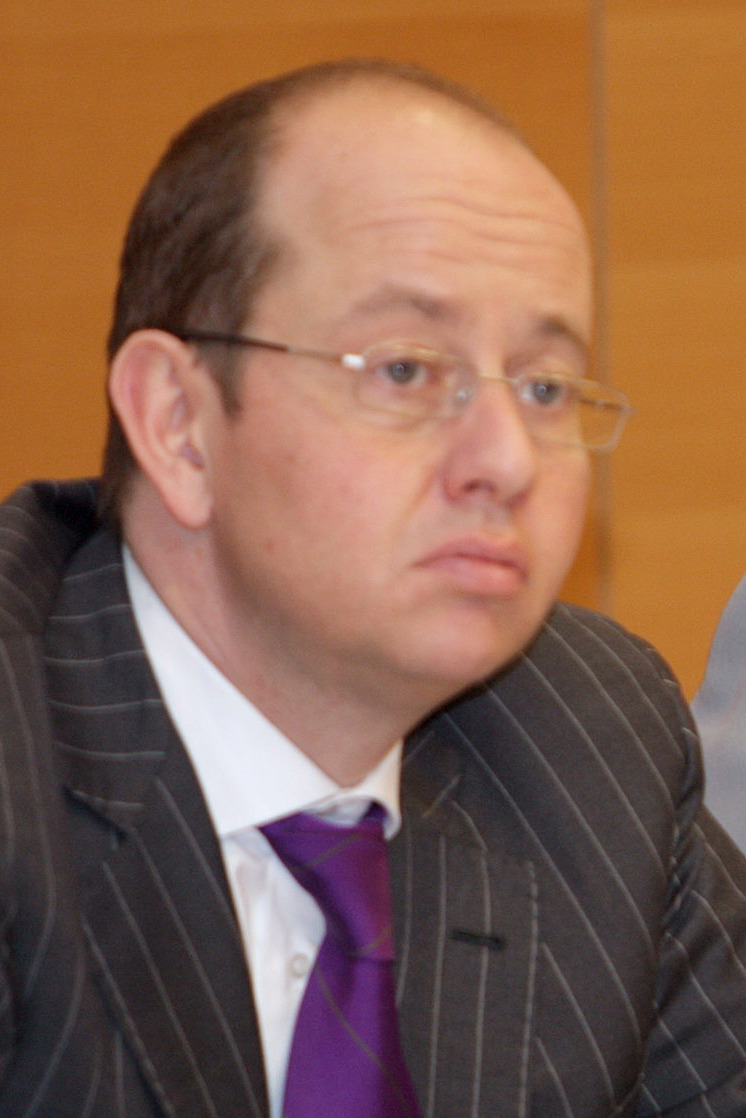
Jean-Louis Schiltz in 2009

Jean-Louis Schiltz (born 14 August 1964 in Luxembourg City) is a Luxembourgish lawyer and retired politician for the Christian Social People's Party (CSV).

== Early life and education ==
Schiltz studied law in Luxembourg and Paris, and became a lawyer in 1989.

== Career ==
Schiltz was first elected to the Chamber of Deputies in 2004 and subsequently served as minister in Jean-Claude Juncker's government, including as Minister for Cooperation and Humanitarian Affairs and Minister delegate for communications. On the 22 February 2006 he additionally became Minister for Defence. He stepped down from these positions with the formation of a new government on 23 July 2009, and became the leader of the CSV group in the newly elected Chamber of Deputies.

== Other activities ==
- RTL Group, Non-Executive Member of the Board of Directors (since 2017)
- Quilvest, Member of the Board of Directors (since 2016)
- Skype, Non-Executive Member of the Board of Directors (2010–2011)
- FEDIL, Vice-chairman of the Board of Directors (since 2019)

Political offices
Preceded by François Biltgen	Minister for Communications; 2004 – 2009	Succeeded by François Biltgen
Preceded by Charles Goerens	Minister for Cooperation and Humanitarian Affairs; 2004 – 2009	Succeeded by Marie-Josée Jacobs
Preceded by Luc Frieden	Minister for Defence; 2006 – 2009	Succeeded by Jean-Marie Halsdorf
Party political offices
Preceded by Claude Wiseler	General Secretary of the CSV; 2000 – 2006	Succeeded by Marco Schank
Preceded by Michel Wolter	President of the CSV in the Chamber of Deputies; 2009 – 2011	Succeeded by Lucien Thiel
