= Jang Thill =

Luxembourgish painter (1913–1984)

- Born: 23 January 1913; Beggen, Luxembourg
- Died: 26 November 1984 (aged 71); Bridel, Luxembourg
- Occupation: Painter

Jang Thill (23 January 1913 – 26 November 1984) was a Luxembourgish painter. His work was part of the painting event in the art competition at the 1936 Summer Olympics.
