= Jean-Marie Halsdorf =

Luxembourgish politician (born 1957)

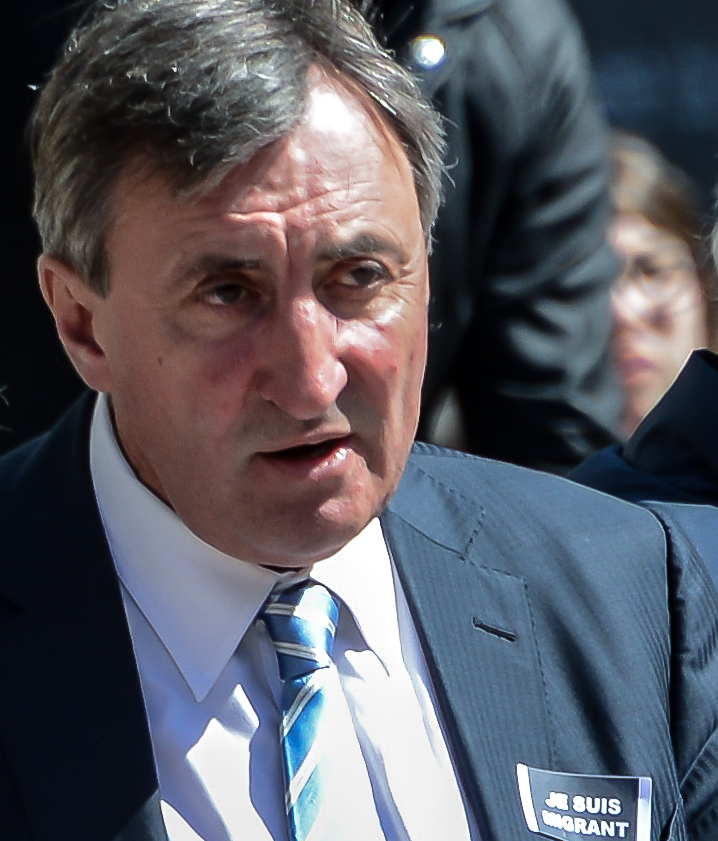

Minister for Defence
- In office 23 July 2009 – 4 December 2013
- Prime Minister: Jean-Claude Juncker
- Preceded by: Jean-Louis Schiltz
- Succeeded by: Etienne Schneider

18th Mayor of Pétange
- In office 2000–2004
- Preceded by: Roger Klein
- Succeeded by: Pierre Mellina

Personal details
- Born: Jean-Marie Eugène Pierre Henri Halsdorf; 1 February 1957 (age 69) Luxembourg City, Luxembourg
- Party: Christian Social People's Party

Jean-Marie Eugène Pierre Henri Halsdorf (born 1 February 1957) is a Luxembourgish politician of the Christian Social People's Party (CSV) who was Minister for Defence of Luxembourg in the Juncker–Asselborn II Government.

== Background and early career ==
He attended grammar school in Echternach and went to university in Strasbourg, France. In 1988 he was elected to the town council of Pétange.

== Mayor of Pétange, Deputy and Cabinet Minister ==
In 2000, he became Mayor of Pétange.

In 1994 he was elected to the Chamber of Deputies, and in 2004 he became a cabinet minister. At that time, he stepped down as Mayor of Pétange.

== Distinctions ==
- Officer vum Order of Merit of the Grand Duchy of Luxembourg (Promotioun 1999)
- Officer vum Order of the Oak Crown (Promotion 2004)

Political offices
Preceded by Roger Klein	Mayor of Pétange; 2000–2004	Succeeded by Pierre Mellina
Preceded by Jean-Louis Schiltz	Minister for Defence; 2009 – 2013	Succeeded by Etienne Schneider
