= Pétange =

Pétange Péiteng (Luxembourgish) Petingen (German)
- Commune
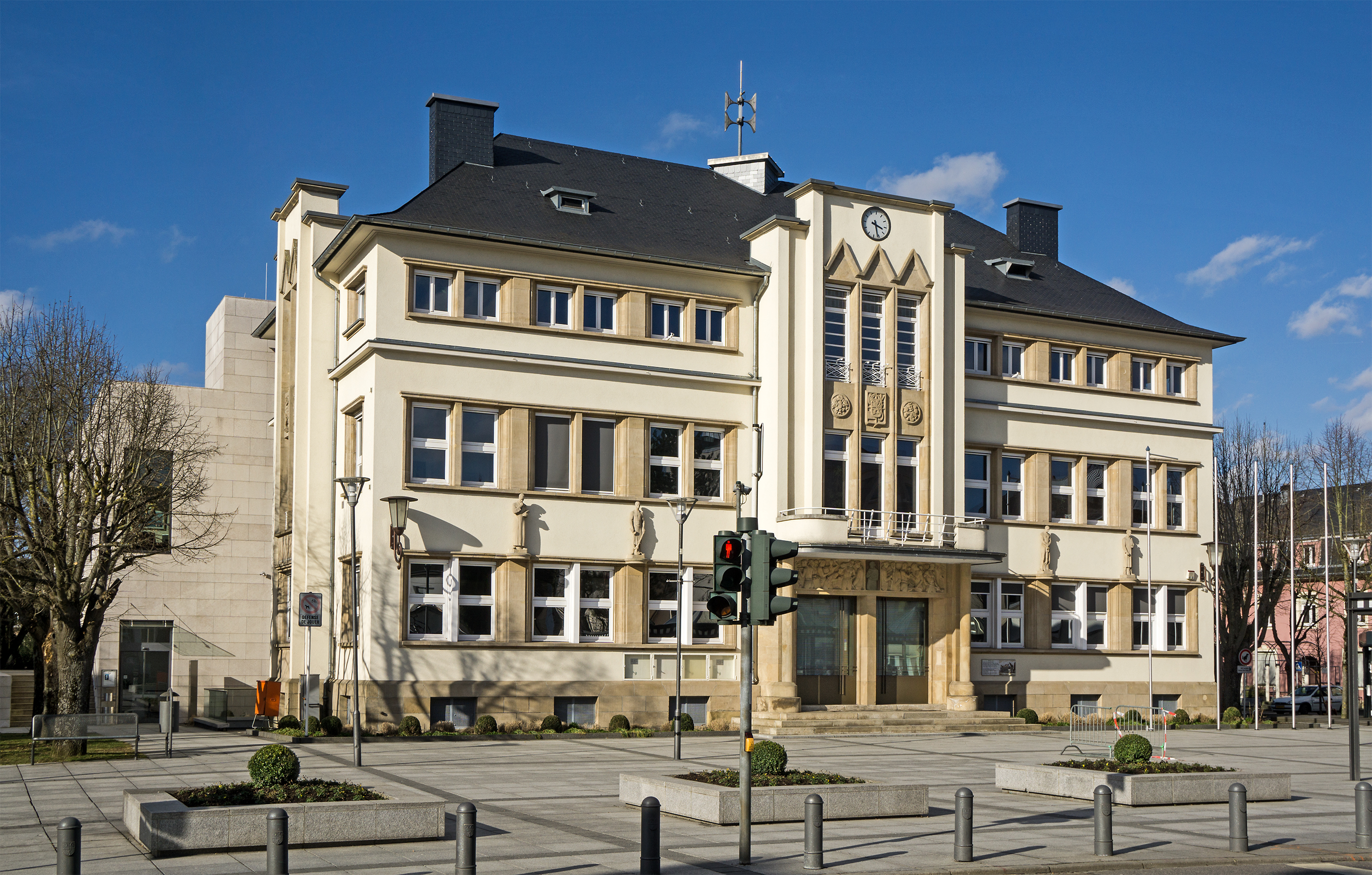
- The town hall

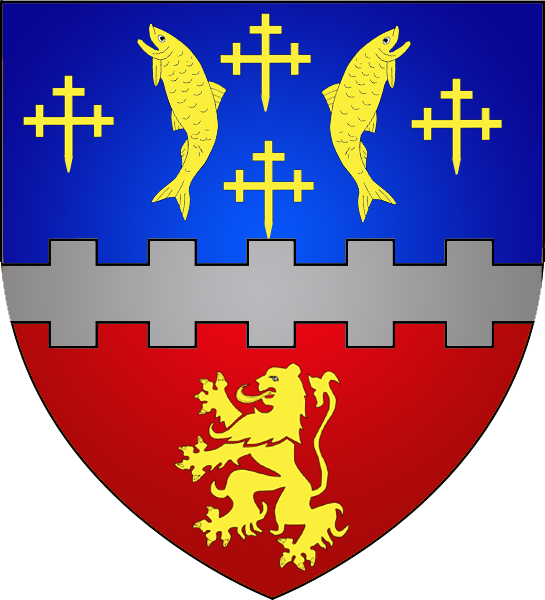
- Coat of arms

- Map of Luxembourg with Pétange highlighted in orange, and the canton in dark red
- Coordinates: 49.5564°N 5.8769°E
- Country: Luxembourg
- Canton: Esch-sur-Alzette

Government
  - Mayor: Jean-Marie Halsdorf (CSV)

Area
  - Total: 11.93 km^{2} (4.61 sq mi)
  - Rank: 91st of 100
- Highest elevation: 397 m (1,302 ft)
  - Rank: 53rd of 100
- Lowest elevation: 260 m (850 ft)
  - Rank: 63rd of 100

Population (2026)
  - Total: 21,396
  - Rank: 5th of 100
  - Density: 1,793/km^{2} (4,645/sq mi)
  - Rank: 3rd of 100
- Time zone: UTC+1 (CET)
  - Summer (DST): UTC+2 (CEST)
- LAU 2: LU0000209
- Website: petange.lu

Pétange (French pronunciation: [petɑ̃ʒ]; Luxembourgish: Péiteng [ˈpɜɪ̯teŋ]; German: Petingen [ˈpeːtɪŋən]) is a commune and town in south-western Luxembourg. It is part of the canton of Esch-sur-Alzette and is the fifth-most populous commune in Luxembourg, as well as the most populous without town status. Pétange lies at the borders with both Belgium and France.

As of September 2026, the town of Pétange, which lies in the north of the commune, has a population of 10,217. Other towns within the commune include Lamadelaine and Rodange. The commune is one of the smallest communes of Luxembourg, yet is the fifth-most populous. It is the most-populous commune without city status.

== History ==
The modern settlement of Pétange was first mentioned in 938 by the name 'Perdgitten'. Six centuries later, Pétange had still not acquired much prominence; in 1536, it was home to only about 25 people.

In 1601, the boundary between Luxembourg and the Duchy of Lorraine was definitively demarcated for the first time. The modern commune was divided between the two, with the town of Pétange going to Luxembourg, but the towns of Rodange and Lamadelaine, which are further to the south, lying on the Lorraine side of the border.

When, in 1795, Luxembourg was annexed into Revolutionary France as part of the département of Forêts, its former territories were reunited, and the commune's territory was established as it is today. However, when Luxembourg passed to the United Kingdom of the Netherlands, after the Congress of Vienna, the towns of Rodange and Lamadelaine passed with it.

The town's importance grew greatly in the late nineteenth century, thanks to the booming iron-mining and steel industries. The first railway into Pétange was opened in 1873, running to Esch-sur-Alzette. Further railway lines were added to Ettelbruck (1873) and Luxembourg City (1900).

On 9 September 1944, Pétange became the first commune in the country to be liberated by Allied soldiers at the end of the German occupation in the Second World War. In remembrance to the first soldier to die in the liberation, a memorial was erected in his honor: Hyman Josefson Square.

On August 9, 2019, a high-end F2 multiple-vortex tornado hit the town; this is a rare occurrence in Luxembourg. 19 people were injured, two seriously, and over 160 buildings were destroyed. The tornado reached windspeed between 200 and 250 km/h, suggesting F3 intensity. Many roofs were completely torn off, some of which landed on houses and vehicles. Large mast were also downed. The tornado traveled 14 km (8.6 miles) in total across a widespread area.

== Geography ==
The commune lies in the extreme south-west of Luxembourg, bordering both the French département of Meurthe-et-Moselle and the Belgian province of Luxembourg. The town of Rodange lies just across the border from the Belgian town of Aubange. Pétange is situated at the west end of the Red Lands: iron-rich sedimentary rocks that form the far south and south-west of Luxembourg. The town lies in the upper reaches of the Chiers valley, and is one of the few places in Luxembourg (along with the commune of Differdange) to lie outside the drainage system of the Rhine.

The commune is only 12 square kilometres (5 sq mi) in area, one of the smallest in Luxembourg, but is the site of three significant towns. The town of Pétange itself has a population of 6,909, but, despite being the seventh-largest town in Grand Duchy, accounts for under half of the population of the commune. Rodange, in the south-west of the commune, is home to 4,505 people, whilst Lamadelaine, in the south of the commune, has a population of 2,335.

== Population ==
Historical population

Year	Pop.	±%
1821	777	—
1851	1,071	+37.8%
1900	4,406	+311.4%
1910	5,964	+35.4%
1922	7,016	+17.6%
1935	10,525	+50.0%

Year	Pop.	±%
1947	10,456	−0.7%
1960	11,623	+11.2%
1970	11,844	+1.9%
1981	12,127	+2.4%
1990	11,909	−1.8%
2000	13,654	+14.7%

Year	Pop.	±%
2005	14,669	+7.4%
2010	15,582	+6.2%
2015	17,582	+12.8%
2020	19,574	+11.3%
2021	20,084	+2.6%

Source data

== Attractions ==
The south of the commune is home to Titelberg, a prominent hill on top of which lie the ruins of a Celtic oppidum. The walled hill fort was 1 km (0.62 mi) long. The entire settlement had a total population of 10,000 before the Roman conquest, making it the largest pre-Roman settlement in Luxembourg.

Pétange is the home of the Grand-Duchy's largest pre-Lenten Karneval celebration. Annually hosting a calvalacade with roughly 1200 participants and thousand of participants, the official name is Karneval Gemeng Péiteng or Kagepe (the initials in Luxembourgish are pronounced Ka, Ge and Pe).

The Fond de Gras heritage railway and museum recreate the conditions of the Red Lands in the year 1900, at the height of their growth and development. Whilst the centre lies just within the commune of Differdange, to the east, the two steam locomotives take visitors to the towns of Pétange and Rodange, and provide a stream of tourists to the towns in the summer.

Pétange has a football team in Luxembourg's top-flight National Division, called Union Titus Pétange. They play their home games at the Stade Municipal. Despite being one of the oldest Luxembourgish clubs in existence, having been founded in 1910, Pétange have won only one trophy, the Luxembourg Cup in 2004–05.

== Sports ==
- Union Titus Pétange - football club.

== Notable people ==
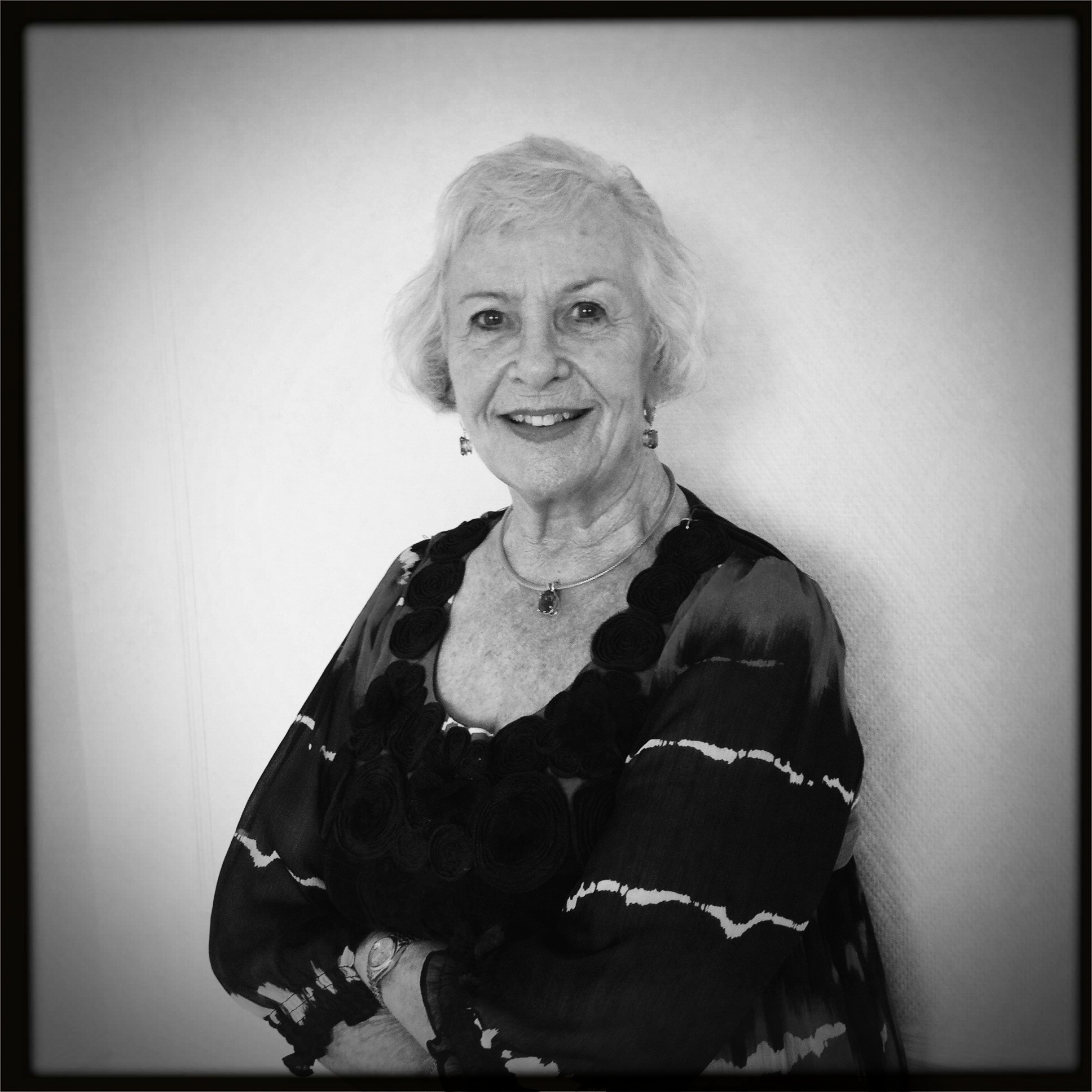
Germaine Damar, 2011

- Michel Rasquin (1899–1958), a Luxembourgish journalist, politician and European Commissioner
- Germaine Simon (1921 in Paris – 2012), a Luxembourgish physician and writer, went to local primary school
- Michel Scheuer (1927 in Rodange – 2015), a West German sprint canoeist, gold and bronze medallist at the 1956 Summer Olympics
- Germaine Damar (born 1929), a Luxembourgish actress and dancer.
- Charles Kohl (1929 in Rodange - 2016), a sculptor, painter and lecturer
- Jean-Marie Halsdorf (born 1957 in Luxembourg City), a Luxembourgish politician & Minister for Defence; became Mayor of Pétange in 2000.
- Pol Cruchten (1963–2019), a Luxembourgish film director and producer.
- Claude Meisch (born 1971), a Luxembourgish politician, Minister of National Education since 2013
- Tessy Antony de Nassau (born 1985), a Luxembourgish businesswoman and non-profit executive; former Royal: went to a local technical high school

== Twin towns ==
Pétange is twinned with:

- Maribor, Slovenia
- Schiffweiler, Germany
- Schio, Italy

== See also ==
- List of mayors of Pétange
