= Luc Frieden =

Prime Minister of Luxembourg since 2023

The Honourable Luc Frieden
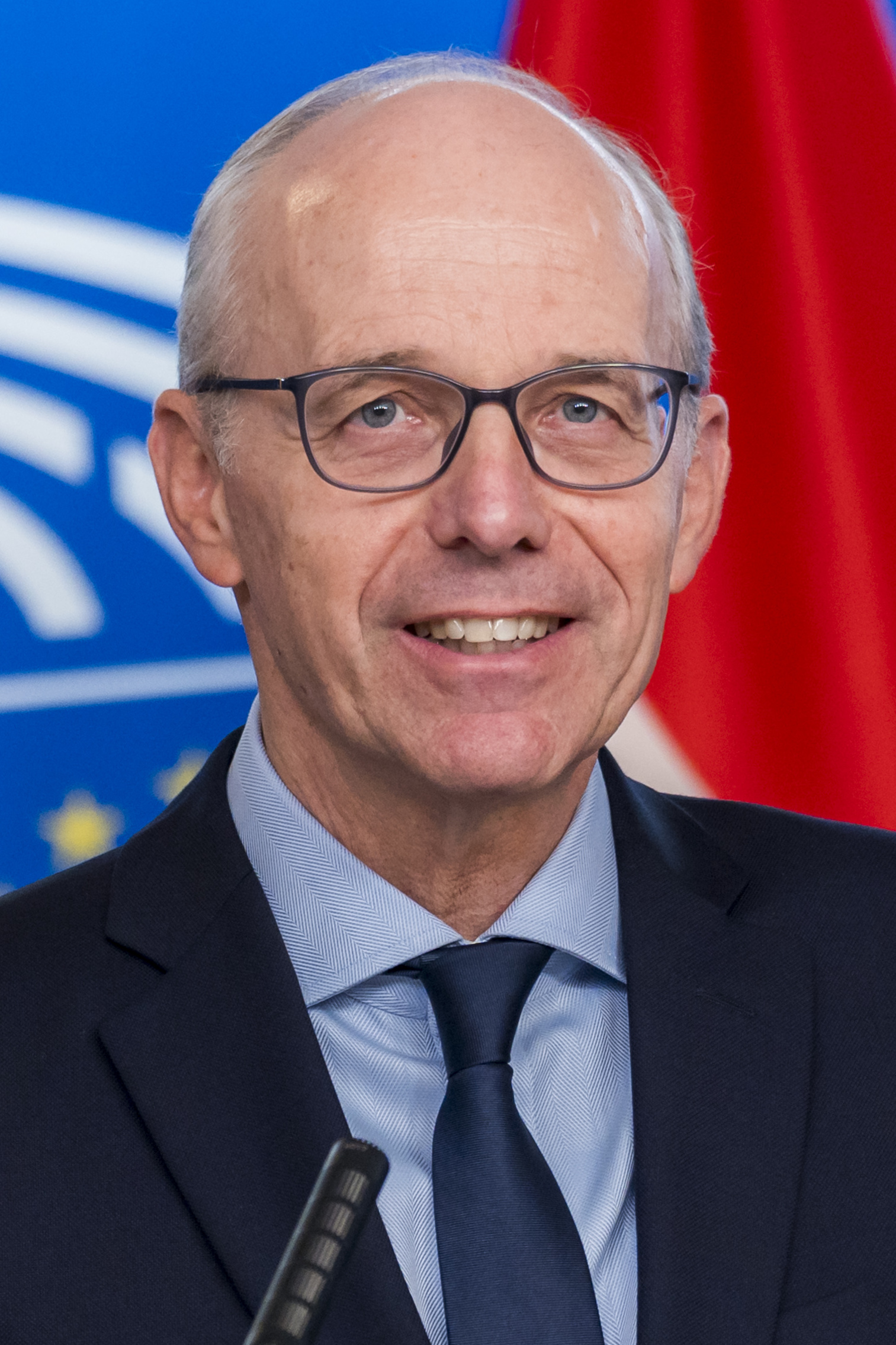
- Frieden in 2025

Prime Minister of Luxembourg
- Incumbent
- Assumed office 17 November 2023
- Monarchs: Henri; Guillaume V
- Deputy: Xavier Bettel
- Government: Frieden-Bettel
- Preceded by: Xavier Bettel

Minister of Finances
- In office 23 July 2009 – 4 December 2013
- Prime Minister: Jean-Claude Juncker
- Government: Juncker-Asselborn II
- Preceded by: Jean-Claude Juncker
- Succeeded by: Pierre Gramegna

Minister of Defence
- In office 31 July 2004 – 22 February 2006
- Prime Minister: Jean-Claude Juncker
- Government: Juncker-Asselborn I
- Preceded by: Charles Goerens
- Succeeded by: Jean-Louis Schiltz

Minister of Justice
- In office 30 January 1998 – 23 July 2009
- Prime Minister: Jean-Claude Juncker
- Government: Juncker-Poos; Juncker-Asselborn I
- Preceded by: Marc Fischbach
- Succeeded by: François Biltgen

Minister of the Treasury and Budget
- In office 30 January 1998 – 23 July 2009
- Prime Minister: Jean-Claude Juncker
- Government: Juncker-Poos; Juncker-Asselborn I
- Preceded by: Marc Fischbach
- Succeeded by: Jean-Claude Juncker

Member of the Chamber of Deputies
- In office 24 October 2023 – 17 November 2023
- Constituency: Centre
- In office 5 December 2013 – 15 September 2014
- Constituency: Centre
- In office 12 June 1994 – 30 January 1998
- Constituency: Centre

President of the Christian Social People’s Party
- Incumbent
- Assumed office 16 March 2024
- Preceded by: Elisabeth Margue

Personal details
- Born: 16 September 1963 (age 63) Esch-sur-Alzette, Luxembourg
- Party: Christian Social People's
- Spouse: Marjolijne Droogleever Fortuyn (m. 1992)
- Children: 2
- Education: University of Luxembourg; Panthéon-Sorbonne University; Queens' College, Cambridge; Harvard University
- Occupation: Politician • lawyer • banker • financier

Luc Frieden (Note: Luxembourgish pronunciation: [lyk ˈfʀiːdən]) (born 16 September 1963) is a Luxembourgish politician and lawyer serving as prime minister of Luxembourg since November 2023. A member of the Christian Social People's Party (CSV), he held numerous cabinet positions in the Luxembourgish government between 1998 and 2013, notably serving as the minister for the Treasury and Budget during the transition from the Franc to the Euro and as minister of Finance during the European debt crisis. Frieden then left politics and was active in the private sector, serving as president of the Luxembourgish Chamber of Commerce and Eurochambres, the business federation of European Chambers of Commerce and Industry.

In early 2023, he was elected to be the lead candidate of the CSV for the general elections in October. He led his party to victory, slightly increasing its vote share and maintaining its 21 seats, while the incumbent Bettel II Government lost its majority due to the decline of The Greens. Consequently, on 9 October 2023, he was appointed by Grand Duke Henri to form a new coalition government, and succeeded Xavier Bettel as prime minister on 17 November where Bettel became the deputy prime minister and minister for Foreign Affairs.

== Background and education ==
Luc Frieden was born on 16 September 1963 in Esch-sur-Alzette, the son of Marie-Josée Ney and Ernest Frieden, who worked in the administration of ARBED at the time and was the president of the Federation of Luxembourgish Hospitals from 2002 to 2009. Both of Frieden's parents are originally from Echternach, a town which he has described as "the foundation of [his] life". He completed high school at the Athénée de Luxembourg and received thereafter an international university education in France, the UK and the US. He graduated in business law from Université Paris 1 Panthéon-Sorbonne. He obtained a master's degree in comparative law from Queens' College, Cambridge and a Master of Laws (LL.M.) from Harvard Law School.

Besides Luxembourgish, he speaks fluent English, German, French and Dutch, his wife's native language.

== Chamber of Deputies (1994–1998) ==
In 1994, Frieden was elected to the Chamber of Deputies on the CSV's Centre list, becoming, at the age of thirty, the then youngest member of the House. While in Parliament, he chaired the Finance Committee as well as the Constitutional Committee and was a leading figure in the process leading to the establishment of a constitutional court and of independent administrative courts in Luxembourg.

== Minister (1998–2013) ==
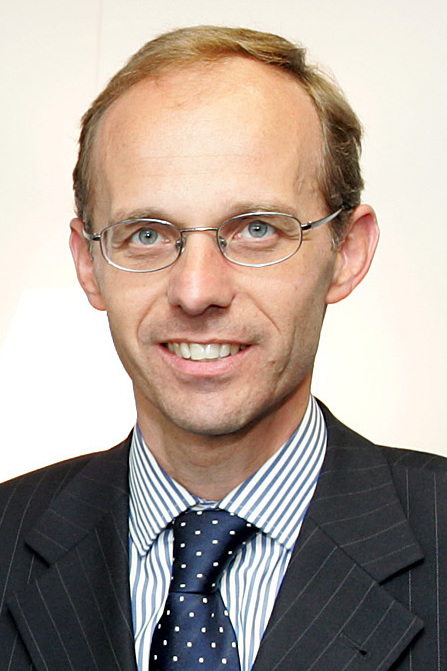
Frieden as Minister of Justice in 2005

In 1998, he became, at the age of 34, Minister of Justice in the Government led by prime minister Jean-Claude Juncker. He also served as Minister of the Treasury and Budget from 1998 to 2009, as Minister of Defence from 2004 to 2006 and Minister of Finance from 2009 to 2013.

In the capacity of Minister for the Treasury and Budget, Frieden was responsible for the successful introduction of the euro as replacement for the Luxembourgish franc. During the Luxembourg Presidency of the Council of the European Union in 2005, he chaired the European Council of Ministers of Justice and Home Affairs (JHA). As Minister of Finance he represented his country at the European Council of Ministers of Economic and Financial Affairs (ECOFIN) as well as at the Eurogroup and participated in the stabilisation of the Eurozone and the shaping of the European banking union. For 15 years, Frieden served as Governor of the World Bank and acted as chairman of the Board of Governors of the International Monetary Fund and the World Bank Group in 2013.

== Career in the private sector (2014–2023) ==
Frieden joined Deutsche Bank as Vice Chairman in September 2014. Based in London he advised the management board and senior management on strategic aspects related to international and European affairs. He also served as chairman of the supervisory board of Deutsche Bank Luxembourg. He left Deutsche Bank in early 2016.

Frieden has been a partner with the Luxembourgish law firm Elvinger Hoss Prussen since 2016. Between 2019 and 2023, he was also President of the Luxembourg Chamber of Commerce. In 2022, he also took over the Presidency of Eurochambres, the business federation of European Chambers of Commerce and Industry.

== Premiership (2023–present) ==
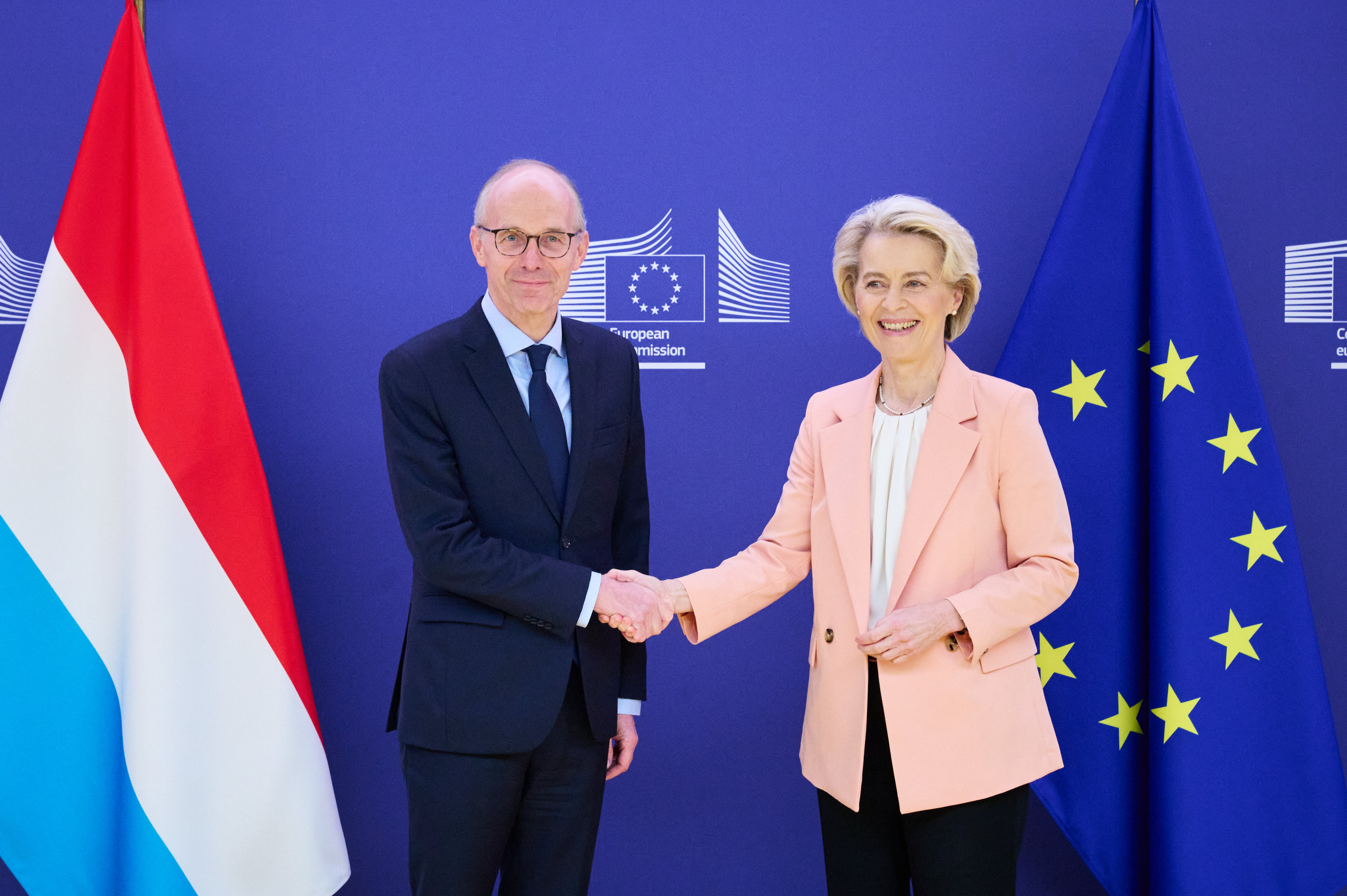
Frieden with President of the European Commission Ursula von der Leyen in December 2023.

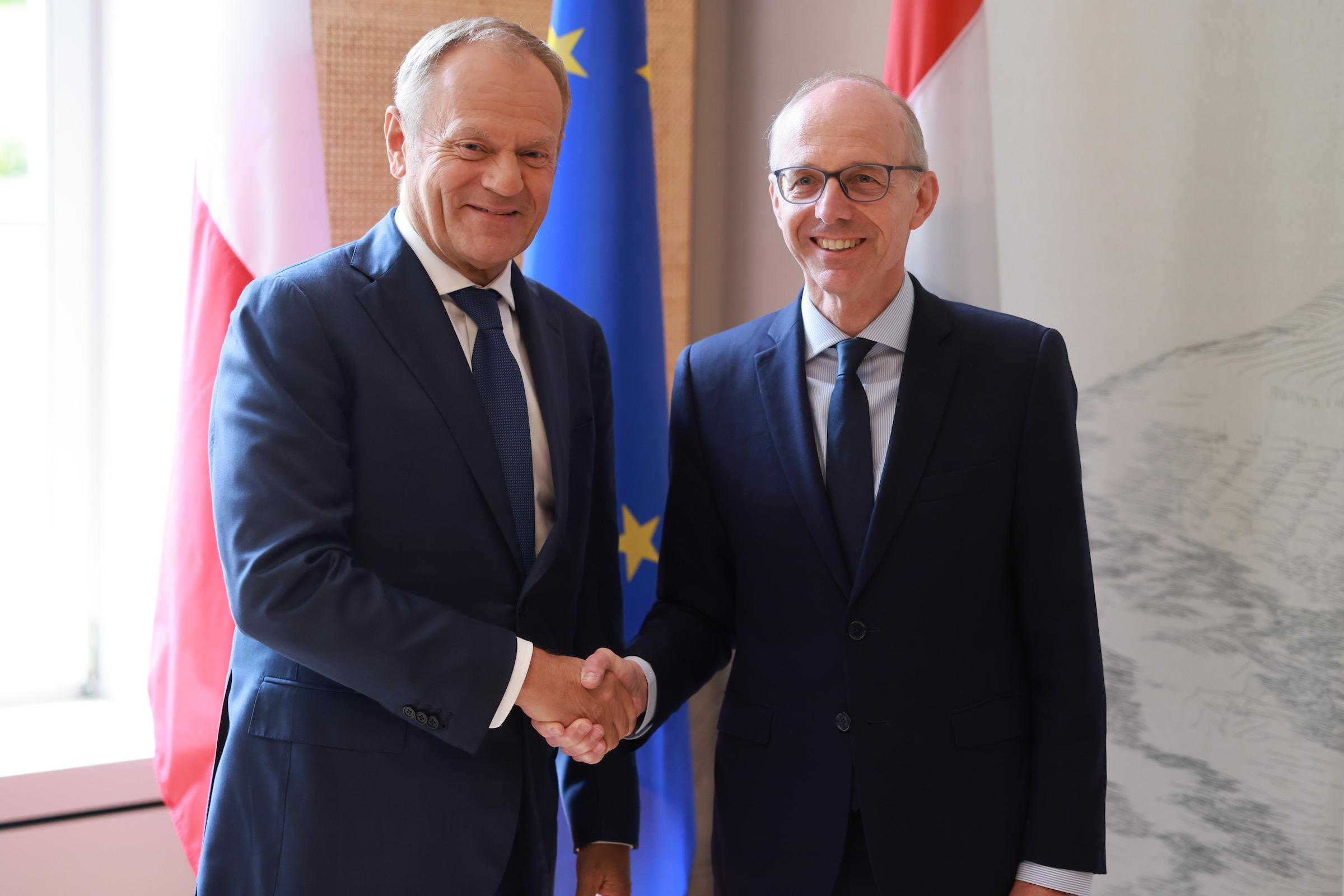
Frieden with Prime Minister of Poland Donald Tusk in June 2024.

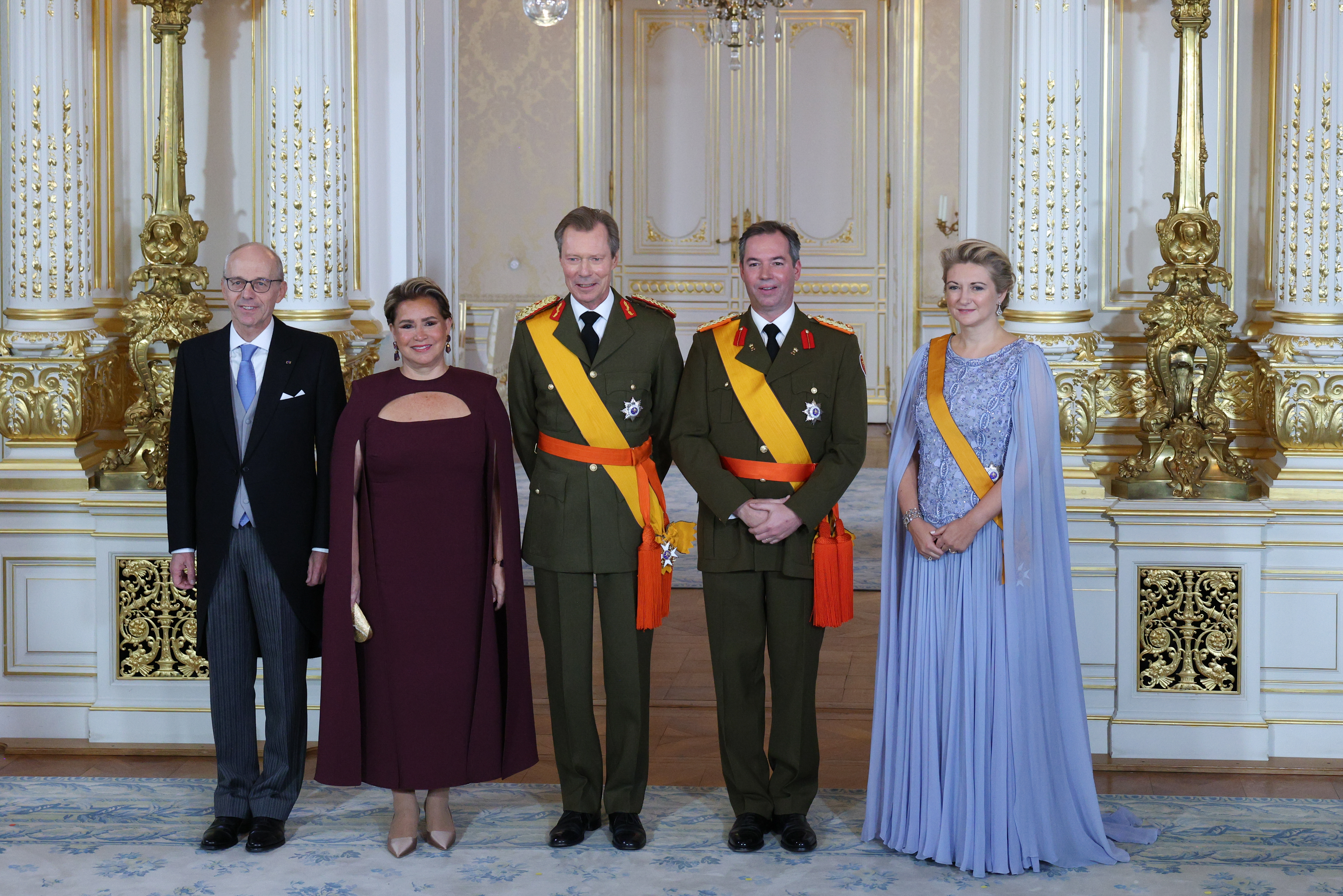
Frieden at the abdication of Grand Duke Henri in October 2025

Following his comeback to politics in 2023, Frieden announced that he would resign from all his professional activities. He was elected to be the lead candidate of the Luxembourg Christian Social People's Party (CSV) for the upcoming national general elections in October.

He led the Christian Democrats to victory in the election, with 29.21% of the vote and 21 seats in the Chamber of Deputies. As the Bettel II Government lost its majority, Frieden was invited by Grand Duke Henri to form a government on 9 October 2023. He led coalition talks between the CSV and the Democratic Party (DP), and succeeded Xavier Bettel as Prime Minister on 17 November 2023.

On 22 November 2023, Frieden presented his government's program for the parliamentary term in the Chamber of Deputies. The cutting of red tape, digitalisation and modernisation were the three main concepts that stood out throughout Frieden's speech. His priorities include the massive recruitment of police officers and the development of video surveillance, the adoption of tax reform and an increased role for the private sector in healthcare.

Frieden's first external visit was to Olaf Scholz in Berlin on 8 January 2024, amid violent protests by German farmers. On 16 January 2024, news magazine Politico published an article where Frieden stated his intent to build a better relationship with Viktor Orbán and visit him, despite his opposition to the EU's support for Ukraine. This led to criticism, and Frieden stated he had been wrongly cited.

On 26 February 2024 Frieden travelled to Paris, where Emmanuel Macron was holding an emergency summit over the situation in Ukraine, as they had suffered the loss of Avdiivka. Czech Prime Minister Peter Fiala proposed to purchase 500,000 rounds of artillery ammunition for Volodymyr Zelenskyy's forces.

On 21 March 2024 at the Nuclear Energy Summit 2024 in Brussels, Frieden declared an openness for nuclear power, breaking a largely held national consensus. Luxembourg would not build a nuclear reactor and was still lobbying neighboring countries to close their reactors close to the Grand-Duchy, but he would not dictate other countries how to transition from fossil fuels. Frieden underlined that research of new nuclear technologies is important in his view. This stance was met with a flurry of criticism inside Luxembourg, ranging from environmental NGOs to nearly all parties. It was noted that Serge Wilmes, minister of environment and also member of Frieden's CSV confirmed the anti-nuclear position of Luxembourg on the same day. In the environmental commission of the Chamber of Deputies, Frieden explained his position on 27 March 2024, which was widely viewed as backpedaling from his statements in Brussels and criticized as uncoordinated and arbitrary.

=== Public image ===
In successive opinion polls, Frieden's popularity within Luxembourg has consistently declined since he took office as prime minister. In a December 2025 poll conducted for RTL and Luxemburger Wort, his popularity rating was 52%, a record low, marking the first time an incumbent prime minister had been ranked outside the top 10 of most popular politicians.

== Other activities ==
=== Corporate boards ===
- Banque Internationale à Luxembourg (BIL), Chairman of the Board of Directors (2016-2023)
- Saint-Paul Luxembourg, Chairman of the Board of Directors (2016–2019)

=== Non-profit organizations ===
- Trilateral Commission, Member of the European Group

== Criticism ==
In 2013, Luxembourg's investor-protection group ProtInvest sent a letter to European Commissioner for Internal Market Michel Barnier, in which it criticised Frieden's decision to appoint his senior adviser Sarah Khabirpour to the board of the CSSF, the country's financial regulator.

During the election campaign for the general elections in October 2023, LSAP politician Max Leners published an 80 page long pamphlet about Frieden's political past, criticizing deportations of minors under his rule as Minister of Justice, his views on labour laws, working hours and pensions as well as his implication in the tax rulings uncovered by the Luxleaks revelations.

== Personal life ==
Frieden married Dutch-born lawyer Marjolijne Droogleever Fortuyn, whom he met while studying at Cambridge, in 1992. They have two children.

== See also ==
- List of current heads of state and government
- List of heads of the executive by approval rating

Political offices
Preceded by Marc Fischbach	Minister for Justice; 1998–2009	Succeeded by François Biltgen
Preceded by Charles Goerens	Minister for Defence; 2004–2006	Succeeded by Jean-Louis Schiltz
Preceded by Jean-Claude Juncker	Minister for Finances; 2009–2013	Succeeded by Pierre Gramegna
Preceded by Xavier Bettel	Prime Minister of Luxembourg; 2023–present	Incumbent
