= Elisabeth Margue =

Luxembourgish politician

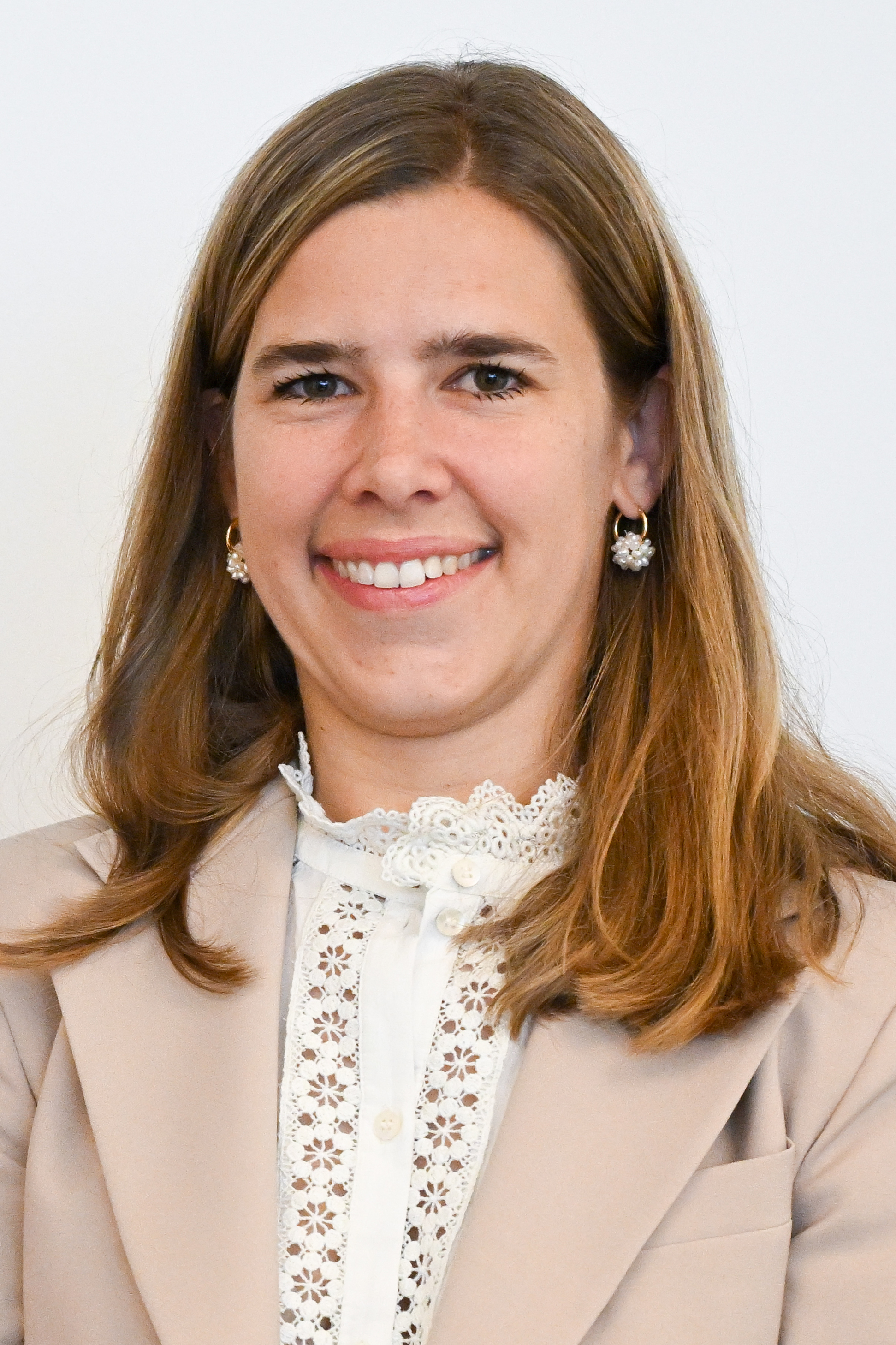
- Margue in 2024

Minister of Justice
- Incumbent
- Assumed office 17 November 2023
- Prime Minister: Luc Frieden
- Preceded by: Sam Tanson
- Government: Frieden-Bettel

Minister Delegate to the Prime Minister for Media and Connectivity
- Incumbent
- Assumed office 17 November 2023
- Prime Minister: Luc Frieden
- Government: Frieden-Bettel
- Preceded by: Xavier Bettel

Minister Delegate to the Prime Minister for Relations with Parliament
- Incumbent
- Assumed office 17 November 2023
- Prime Minister: Luc Frieden
- Government: Frieden-Bettel
- Preceded by: Marc Hansen

Member of the Chamber of Deputies
- In office 11 October 2022 – 17 November 2023
- Preceded by: Viviane Reding
- Constituency: Centre

President of the Christian Social People's Party
- In office 26 March 2022 – 16 March 2024
- Preceded by: Frank Engel
- Succeeded by: Luc Frieden

Personal details
- Born: 7 April 1990 (age 36) Luxembourg City, Luxembourg
- Party: Christian Social People's Party (2007–present)
- Education: Paris 1 Panthéon-Sorbonne University; London School of Economics

Elisabeth Margue (born 7 April 1990) is a Luxembourgish politician and lawyer. A member of the Christian Social People's Party (CSV), she has served as Minister of Justice in the Frieden-Bettel Government since 17 November 2023.

== Education ==
After finishing her secondary education at the Lycée de Garçons de Luxembourg, Margue studied private law at Paris 1 Panthéon-Sorbonne University graduating with a Master's degree in industrial property in 2014. In 2015, she obtained a Master of Laws from the London School of Economics, specializing in corporate and commercial law.

== Professional career ==
After her studies, Margue joined the business law firm Arendt & Medernach, where she worked as a litigator and dealt mainly with liability cases, such as medical liability, leases and road accidents. Since 2016, she was Avocat à la Cour and member of the Barreau (Bar association).

== Political career ==
Margue joined the CSV in 2007. In 2013, she stood as candidate in the general election in the Centre constituency and got 16 805 votes. She was asked to be a candidate by then-Finance Minister Luc Frieden, whom she knew because they were both living in the town of Contern and she had been a babysitter to his children. She was considered as Frieden's disciple since her entry into the party and a part of the wing of the party closer to economic liberalism.

In February 2016, Margue became president of the party's youth wing CSJ, a position she held until December 2018.

In 2017, she was elected (with 6 357 votes) to her first political mandate, member of the municipal council of Luxembourg City, where she was part of the coalition between the DP and CSV. A year later, she stood again as candidate in the general election in the Centre constituency. Her party managed to get 7 out of 21 seats in the centre, but Margue missed out on being directly elected to the Chamber of Deputies, coming in eighth on the CSV list with just 82 votes less than seventh-place finisher Paul Galles.

In January 2019, she became vice-president of her party. Margue was also a member of the managing board of the CSV-Frëndeskrees association. In 2021, together with former CSV president Frank Engel and other members of the board, she was charged with forgery, use of forgeries, fraud, abuse of trust and money laundering as part of the so-called “Frëndeskrees-Affäir”. Margue was, as all defendants in this case, acquitted. When Engel quit the CSV in March 2021, Margue and Stéphanie Weydert took over the party presidency on an interim basis for six weeks. In March 2022, Margue became president of the CSV, a position she initially shared with Claude Wiseler. She held this position until 16 March 2024, when Luc Frieden was elected party president.

On 13 September 2022, CSV deputy Viviane Reding announced her retirement from the Chamber of Deputies and politics in general. As Reding represented the Centre constituency, Margue was next in line to take over her seat. She was sworn in on 11 October 2022, just a year before the next general elections were scheduled. In her inaugural speech, she stated her belief that climate protection should not come at the expense of the economy and stressed the need for friction-free investments in real estate.

During the electoral campaign for the general election of 2023, Margue was co-leading candidate in her constituency, together with national leading candidate Luc Frieden. With 23 164 votes, she was the second most voted candidate of the CSV in the Centre was elected to the Chamber of Deputies. On 24 October 2023, she was sworn in as Member of Parliament, a position she held until 17 November 2023, when she became Minister of Justice.

=== Minister of Justice (2023–present) ===
On 17 November 2023, Margue was sworn in as Minister of Justice, Minister delegated to the Prime Minister, responsible for Media and Communications, Minister delegated to the Prime Minister, responsible for Relations with Parliament. She is part of the Frieden-Bettel Government, a coalition between her CSV and the Democratic Party (DP).

== Personal life ==
Margue has a child, who was born only four weeks before she became a member of the Chamber of Deputies.
