= Luxembourg for Business =

Luxembourgish government trading agency

Luxembourg for Business (LfB) is an agency of the government of Luxembourg for the promotion of trade to benefit the economy of Luxembourg. It was founded in 2008 as an initiative by the Ministry of the Economy and Foreign Trade and the Ministry for the Middle Class, Tourism and Housing, the Chamber of Commerce, the Ducroire Office, the National Credit and Investment Corporation (SNCI), and the Luxembourg Business Federation (FEDIL).

According to its mission statement:

As Luxembourg's trade promotion agency, Luxembourg for Business contributes to policy and program as defined by the Minister of the Economy and Foreign Trade whereby the agency's mission and activities center mainly on strategic marketing. Luxembourg for Business defines its competence area as generating added value and competence through the streamlining and coordinating of existing partner structures which benefit the Luxembourg economy in promoting a coherent nation brand abroad.
