= François Biltgen =

Luxembourgish politician

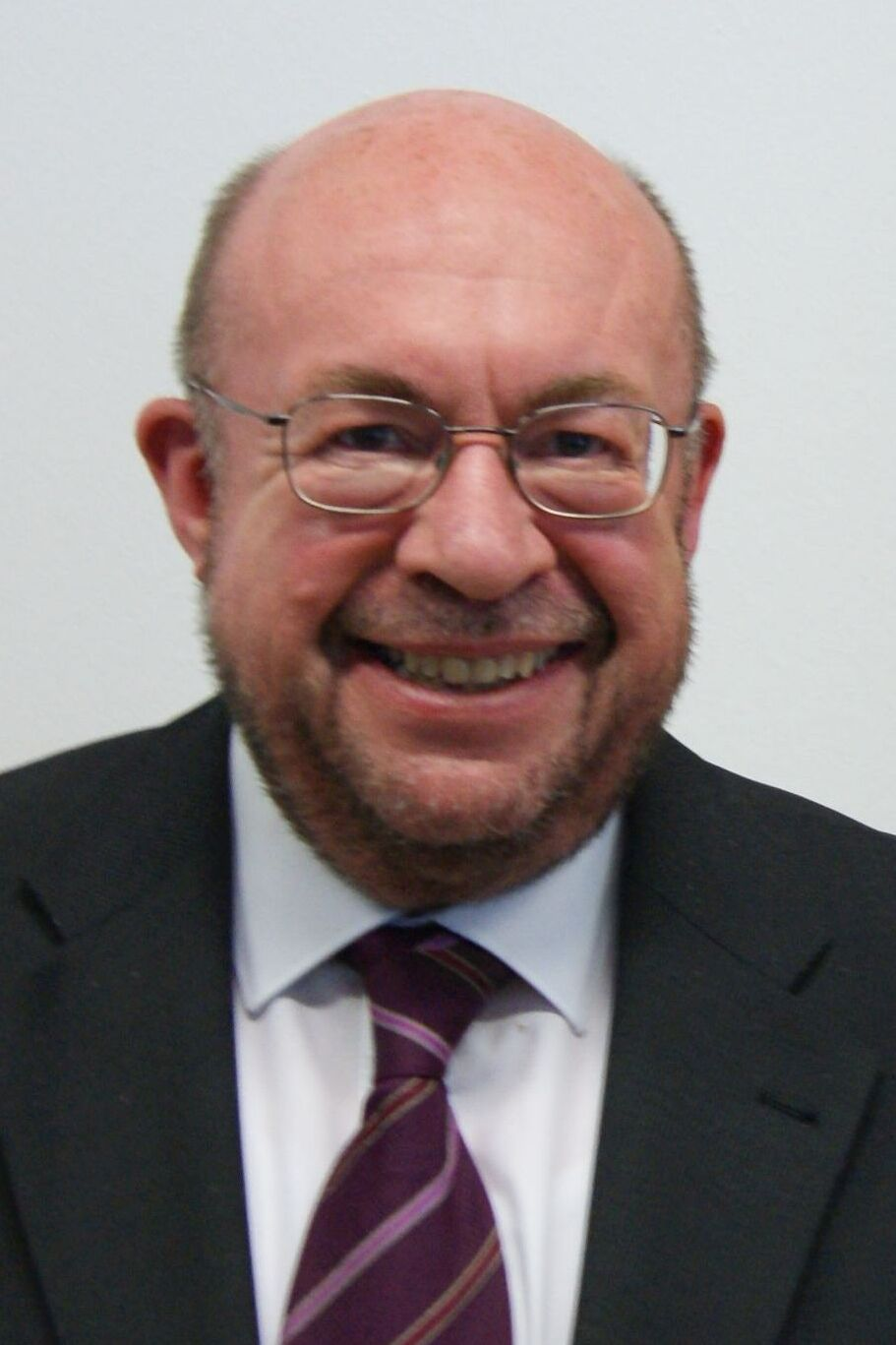
François Biltgen at the Management Center Innsbruck (MCI) in 2019

François Biltgen (born 28 September 1958 in Esch-sur-Alzette, Luxembourg) is a Luxembourgish politician who has served as Minister for Justice, Minister for Communications and the Media, Minister for Religious Affairs, Minister for the Civil Service and Administrative Reform, and Minister for Higher Education and Research. until 2013.

He was born in Esch-sur-Alzette, in the south-western Luxembourg and studied law in Paris. In 1987, he was elected to the communal council of Esch-sur-Alzette, and in 1994 he was elected to the Chamber of Deputies as a Christian Social People's Party (CSV) candidate. He was elected as President of the CSV in 2003.

After the elections which was held in June 2009, he was appointed the Minister of Justice, the Minister for the Civil Service and Administrative Reform, Minister for Higher Education and Research, Minister for Communications and Media as well as the Minister for Religious Affairs. In 2009, he also signed the coalition agreement to distribute ministerial portfolios between the CSV and the LSAP delegates.

In October 2013, he became a Judge at the European Court of Justice, replacing Jean-Jacques Kasel.

Biltgen is married and is the father of two children.

Political offices
Preceded by Mady Delvaux-Stehres	Minister for Communications (first time); 1994 – 1999	Succeeded by Jean-Louis Schiltz
Preceded by Jean-Louis Schiltz	Minister for Communications (second time); 2009 – 2013	Succeeded by Xavier Bettel
Preceded by Luc Frieden	Minister for Justice; 2009 - 2013	Succeeded by Felix Braz
Party political offices
Preceded by Erna Hennicot-Schoepges	President of the CSV; 2003 – 2009	Succeeded by Michel Wolter
