= Carole Dieschbourg =

Luxembourgish politician and writer

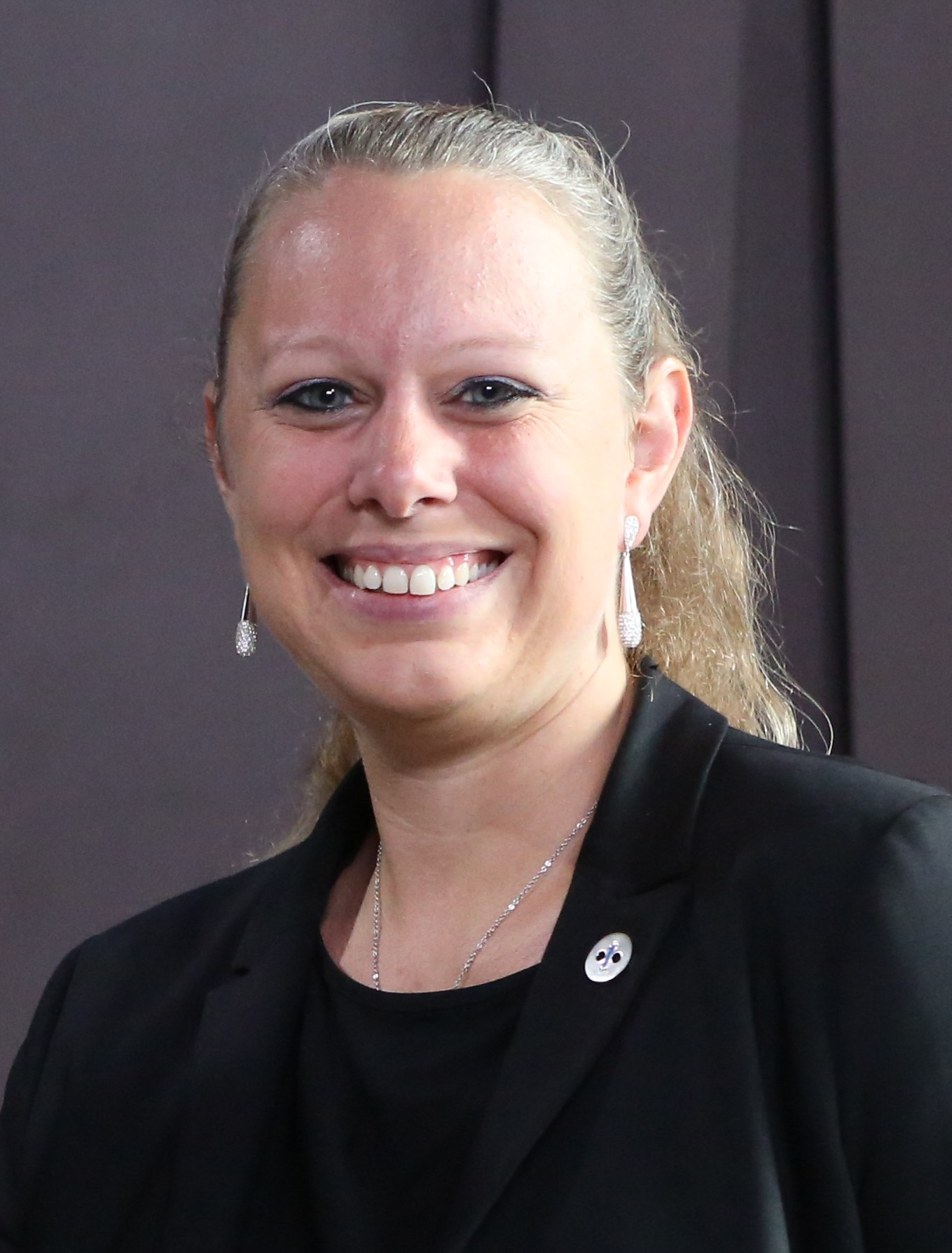
Carole Dieschbourg (2017).

Carole Dieschbourg (born 3 October 1977) is a Luxembourgish writer and politician of The Greens. She was Minister for the Environment in the Bettel I and II coalition governments from 2013 to 2022. She represented Luxembourg at the COP22 Climate Change Conference in Marrakesh, November 2016.

== Biography ==
Born in Ettelbruck on 3 October 1977, Dieschbourg matriculated from the Lycée classique d'Echternach in 1997 before studying historical sciences and German at the University of Trier, earning a Master of Arts in 2005. In 2005, she became coordinator of "Moulins – inventaire, excursion et sentier régional" (Mills – inventory, excursion and regional trail) under the Leader + Müllerthal programme, publishing Die Mühlen des Müllerthals (The Mullerthal Mills) in 2007.

In 2011, Dieschbourg entered politics as a municipal councillor in Echternach. Following the elections on 20 October 2013, she joined the Luxembourg government, becoming Minister for the Environment on 4 December 2013. Prior to her governmental appointment, she was a board member of Moulin J.P. Dieschbourg, a family business established in 1897.

Interviewed by Romain Van Dyck in the Luxembourg newspaper Le Quotidien on 7 November 2016, she stressed the importance of arriving at a European position at the Climate Conference in Marrakech rather than agreements with individual countries. Luxembourg would above all be contributing by bringing about a major reduction in carbon emissions from road vehicles. She announced that the country would have 800 recharging facilities for electric cars by 2020 compared with 3,000 for the whole of France.

== The “garden shed” scandal ==
In 2019 and subsequent years, Dieschbourg was suspected of favoritism in granting a late planning permission for building works on a garden shed to Roberto Traversini in 2019, at the time member of the Green and mayor of Differdange, in a Natura 2000 protected area, even though the construction of said shed had already started without the latter requesting a permission in due time.

Due to her diplomatic immunity, Dieschbourg couldn't be questioned in her official capacity at the time. The Chamber of Deputies therefore would have to vote on whether to lift her immunity, requiring a formal process involving lawmakers.

In 2022, Dieschbourg affirmed that she would advise lawmakers to support this course of action, stating, “There is not doubt for me that the lifting of my immunity is the right path”. However, just hours thereafter, she tearfully announced her resignation at a press conference. While maintaining her innocence, Dieschbourg explained that parliament had crucial matters to attend to, and initiating proceedings against her would consume valuable time. She expressed, “I don’t want this anymore”, particularly in light of the numerous hearings that had already taken place in 2019. As a result, Energy Minister Claude Turmes of the Green took over her mandate as interim minister. A preliminary investigation by the Luxembourg public prosecutor’s office to assess whether the case will go to trial had been ongoing since 2019 and a request had been sent to the Chamber of Deputies for a vote on Dieschbourg’s immunity. In March 2023, the deputies adopted a resolution to lift her immunity and in April 2023 the judicial police started questioning Dieschbourg regarding this matter.

== Other activities ==
- World Economic Forum (WEF), Member of the Europe Policy Group (since 2017)

== Publications ==
- Dieschbourg, Carole. 2007. Die Mühlen des Müllerthals. Editions Guy Binsfeld. ISBN 978-2-87954-172-3.
