= 1952 in Luxembourg =

- Decades: 1930s; 1940s; 1950s; 1960s; 1970s
- See also: History of Luxembourg; List of years in Luxembourg

The following lists events that happened during 1952 in the Grand Duchy of Luxembourg.

== Incumbents ==
Position	Incumbent
Grand Duke	Charlotte
Prime Minister	Pierre Dupong
President of the Chamber of Deputies	Émile Reuter
President of the Council of State	Léon Kauffman (until 14 February); Félix Welter (from 14 February)
Mayor of Luxembourg City	Émile Hamilius

== Events ==
=== April – June ===
- 2 May – Hubert Clement is appointed to the Council of State.
- 27 May – Luxembourg is one of six signatories of the Treaty of Paris, which was to create the European Defence Community.
- 12 June – A law is reforming the organisation of the Luxembourg Army is passed.

=== July – September ===
- 23 July – The foreign ministers of the six European Coal and Steel Community meet in Paris to decide on the seat of the organisation's headquarters. At Joseph Bech's proposal, Luxembourg City is chosen as the provisional working seat.
- 26 July – At the 1952 Summer Olympics, Josy Barthel wins the men's 1,500m in a new Olympic record time: to date, the only time an athlete has won a gold medal for Luxembourg at the Olympics.
- 10 August – The High Authority of the European Coal and Steel Community holds its first meeting, at Luxembourg City Hall.

== Births ==
- 6 February – Charles Goerens, politician
- 29 March – Lucien Faber, athlete
- 12 April – Marie-Josée Frank, politician
- 27 June – Mars Di Bartolomeo, politician
- 9 July – François Diederich, chemist
- 18 July – Christine Doerner, politician
- 9 August – Jean-Louis Margue, footballer
- 22 November – Lydie Polfer, politician

== Deaths ==
- 25 March – Léon Kauffman, politician and Prime Minister
