= 1969 in Luxembourg =

- Decades: 1940s; 1950s; 1960s; 1970s; 1980s
- See also: History of Luxembourg; List of years in Luxembourg

The following lists events that happened during 1969 in the Grand Duchy of Luxembourg.

== Incumbents ==
Position	Incumbent
Grand Duke	Jean
Prime Minister	Pierre Werner
Deputy Prime Minister	Henry Cravatte (until 6 February); Eugène Schaus (from 6 February)
President of the Chamber of Deputies	Romain Fandel; Pierre Grégoire
President of the Council of State	Félix Welter (until 30 June); Maurice Sevenig (from 1 July)
Mayor of Luxembourg City	Paul Wilwertz

== Events ==
=== January – March ===
- 6 February – Pierre Werner forms a new government, with Eugène Schaus of the Democratic Party replacing the LSAP's Henry Cravatte as Werner's deputy.
- 24 March - Prince Félix resigns from the Council of State.
- 29 March – Representing Luxembourg, Romuald Figuier finishes eleventh in the Eurovision Song Contest 1969 with the song Catherine (song).

=== April – June ===
- 10 April – At football, Luxembourg beats Mexico 2–1, recording Luxembourg's first victory in international football since 1963.

=== July – September ===
- 1 July - Maurice Sevenig is appointed President of the Council of State, replacing Félix Welter, who resigned the position the previous day.
- 8 July – A law introducing value added tax is passed.

=== October – December ===
- 22 November – A Luxair flight from Frankfurt hits a snowback upon touchdown at Luxembourg-Findel. No-one is killed, but the plane is written off.
- December – Prime Minister Pierre Werner presents the Werner Plan on economic and monetary union in the European Union.

== Births ==
- 22 May – Nancy Kemp-Arendt, athlete and politician
- 29 May - Sandrine Cantoreggi, violinist
