= 1959 in Luxembourg =

- Decades: 1930s; 1940s; 1950s; 1960s; 1970s
- See also: History of Luxembourg; List of years in Luxembourg

The following lists events that happened during 1959 in the Grand Duchy of Luxembourg.

== Incumbents ==
Position	Incumbent
Grand Duke	Charlotte
Prime Minister	Pierre Frieden (until 23 February); Pierre Werner (from 2 March)
Deputy Prime Minister	Eugène Schaus (post created on 2 March)
President of the Chamber of Deputies	Émile Reuter; Joseph Bech
President of the Council of State	Félix Welter
Mayor of Luxembourg City	Émile Hamilius

== Events ==
=== January – March ===
- 1 February – Elections are held to the Chamber of Deputies. The Christian Social People's Party loses 5 seats, while the Democratic Party gains five.
- 23 February – Prime Minister Pierre Frieden dies in Zürich, twenty-two days after winning re-election.
- 2 March – Pierre Werner becomes Prime Minister, seven days after the death of his Christian Social People's Party colleague Pierre Frieden. He forms a new government in coalition with the Democratic Party, with Eugène Schaus in the new office as Deputy Prime Minister.
- 11 March – Luxembourg misses the Eurovision Song Contest for the first time: the only time before the country's withdrawal from the contest since 1993.

=== April – June ===
- 7 June – Charly Gaul wins the 1959 Giro d'Italia.

=== July – September ===
- 4 August – Nicolas Margue is appointed to the Council of State.

=== October – December ===
- 30 December – Paul Wilwertz is re-appointed to the Council of State, having previously been a member from 1945 to 1954.

== Births ==
- 12 April – Andy Bausch, film director
- 18 May – Ranga Yogeshwar, scientist
- 8 October – Claude Michely, cyclist
- 28 December – Antoine, Prince of Ligne

== Deaths ==
- 23 February – Pierre Frieden, politician and Prime Minister
- 2 December – Leo Müller, politician and journalist
