= 1964 in Luxembourg =

- Decades: 1940s; 1950s; 1960s; 1970s; 1980s
- See also: History of Luxembourg; List of years in Luxembourg

The following lists events that happened during 1964 in the Grand Duchy of Luxembourg.

== Incumbents ==
Position	Incumbent
Grand Duke	Charlotte (until 12 November); Jean (from 12 November)
Prime Minister	Pierre Werner
Deputy Prime Minister	Eugène Schaus (until 15 July); Henry Cravatte (from 15 July)
President of the Chamber of Deputies	Joseph Bech; Victor Bodson
President of the Council of State	Félix Welter
Mayor of Luxembourg City	Paul Wilwertz

== Events ==
=== January – March ===
- 21 March – Representing Luxembourg, Hugues Aufray finishes fourth in the Eurovision Song Contest 1964 with the song Dès que le printemps revient.

=== April – June ===
- May – The Moselle canal is inaugurated by Grand Duchesse Charlotte, Charles De Gaulle, and Heinrich Lübke.
- 7 June – Legislative elections are held. In the Chamber of Deputies, the DP loses five seats, as the LSAP and KPL make progress at their expense. The CSV is beaten in the popular vote for the first time, but remains the largest party by seats.

=== July – September ===
- 15 July – Pierre Werner forms a new government, with the LSAP's Henry Cravatte replacing Eugène Schaus of the Democratic Party as Werner's deputy.
- 21 July - Victor Bodson resigns from the Council of State to take up his seat in the Chamber of Deputies.

=== October – December ===
- 12 November – Grand Duchesse Charlotte abdicates and is succeeded by her son, Jean.

== Births ==
- 24 March - Agnès Durdu, member of the Council of State
- 14 August – Jean-Louis Schiltz, politician
- 10 October – Guy Hellers, footballer

== Deaths ==
- 14 March – Nicolas Majerus, jurist
