= 1965 in Luxembourg =

- Decades: 1940s; 1950s; 1960s; 1970s; 1980s
- See also: History of Luxembourg; List of years in Luxembourg

The following lists events that happened during 1965 in the Grand Duchy of Luxembourg.

== Incumbents ==
Position	Incumbent
Grand Duke	Jean
Prime Minister	Pierre Werner
Deputy Prime Minister	Henry Cravatte
President of the Chamber of Deputies	Victor Bodson
President of the Council of State	Félix Welter
Mayor of Luxembourg City	Paul Wilwertz

== Events ==
=== January – March ===
- 26 February - Fernand Georges is appointed to the Council of State.
- 2 March – Luxembourg City is agreed to remain one of the seats of the European Union as part of the negotiations over the Merger Treaty.
- 20 March – Representing Luxembourg, France Gall wins the Eurovision Song Contest 1965 with the song Poupée de cire, poupée de son.

=== April – June ===
- 12 June – A law is signed governing industrial relations, making arbitration compulsory.

=== July – September ===
- 23 August – Antoine Krier replaces Nicolas Biever in the government, after Biever's death the previous month.

=== October – December ===
- 30 December – Compulsory national service is reduced to six months.

== Births ==
- 14 January – Désirée Nosbusch, singer and presenter of Eurovision Song Contest 1984, the last time Luxembourg hosted the Eurovision Song Contest.
- 22 October – Georges Lentz, composer
- 4 December - Françoise Groben, cellist
- 10 December – Alain Hamer, football referee

== Deaths ==
- 15 July – Nicolas Biever, politician and trade unionist
