= 1967 in Luxembourg =

- Decades: 1940s; 1950s; 1960s; 1970s; 1980s
- See also: History of Luxembourg; List of years in Luxembourg

The following lists events that happened during 1967 in Luxembourg.

== Incumbents ==
Position	Incumbent
Grand Duke	Jean
Prime Minister	Pierre Werner
Deputy Prime Minister	Henry Cravatte
President of the Chamber of Deputies	Victor Bodson; Romain Fandel
President of the Council of State	Félix Welter
Mayor of Luxembourg City	Paul Wilwertz

== Events ==
- 3 January – The coalition agreement between the CSV and LSAP is renewed and a cabinet reshuffle performed. Madeleine Frieden-Kinnen becomes the first woman in the cabinet.
- 8 April – Representing Luxembourg, Vicky Leandros finishes fourth in the Eurovision Song Contest 1967 with the song L'amour est bleu.
- 17 May – Luxembourg adopts the International Labour Organization's regulations on gender equality in wages.
- 22 June – A law is passed abolishing compulsory military service.
- 16 August – A law is passed mandating the construction of a motorway network in Luxembourg.

== Births ==
- 9 June – Michel Majerus, artist

== Deaths ==
- 19 August – Hugo Gernsback, inventor
- 22 September – Albert Calmes, historian
- 9 December – Charles Léon Hammes, jurist
- 25 December – René Blum, politician
