= 1968 in Luxembourg =

- Decades: 1940s; 1950s; 1960s; 1970s; 1980s
- See also: History of Luxembourg; List of years in Luxembourg

The following lists events that happened during 1968 in the Grand Duchy of Luxembourg.

== Incumbents ==
Position	Incumbent
Grand Duke	Jean
Prime Minister	Pierre Werner
Deputy Prime Minister	Henry Cravatte
President of the Chamber of Deputies	Romain Fandel
President of the Council of State	Félix Welter
Mayor of Luxembourg City	Paul Wilwertz

== Events ==
- 6 April – Representing Luxembourg, Chris Baldo and Sophie Garel finish eleventh in the Eurovision Song Contest 1968 with the song Nous vivrons d'amour.
- 5 August – A law reforming secondary education is passed.
- 5 October – A law changing the criteria for eligibility to sit in the Chamber of Deputies is passed.
- 29 October – Disagreements over the budget for the following year lead to the collapse of the Werner-Cravatte Government.
- 15 December – Legislative elections are held. In the Chamber of Deputies, the DP wins five extra seats, reversing their losses in 1964.
- 16 December – Paul Wilwertz resigns from the Council of State to take up his seat in the Chamber of Deputies.
