= 1953 in Luxembourg =

- Decades: 1930s; 1940s; 1950s; 1960s; 1970s
- See also: History of Luxembourg; List of years in Luxembourg

The following lists events that happened during 1953 in the Grand Duchy of Luxembourg.

== Incumbents ==
Position	Incumbent
Grand Duke	Charlotte
Prime Minister	Pierre Dupong (until 29 December); Joseph Bech (from 29 December)
President of the Chamber of Deputies	Émile Reuter
President of the Council of State	Félix Welter
Mayor of Luxembourg City	Émile Hamilius

== Events ==
- 26 February–21 April 1953 - Battle of Chatkol during the Korean War. Luxembourg soldiers fought against 55 consecutive nights of Chinese assaults.
- 9 April – Hereditary Grand Duke Jean marries Princess Joséphine-Charlotte of Belgium.
- 1 May – First iron cast by the European Coal and Steel Community at Belval, Esch-sur-Alzette.
- 12 May – Albert Goldmann is appointed to the Council of State.
- 12 May – Léon Schaus is appointed to the Council of State.
- 24 June – Law passed to build Esch-sur-Sûre Dam, which would create the Upper Sauer Lake.
- 29 December – Prime Minister Pierre Dupong dies in office. He is replaced by Christian Social People's Party colleague Joseph Bech, who leads the Bech-Bodson Ministry.

== Births ==
- 13 March – François Valentiny, architect
- 1 July – Nico Helminger, writer
- 3 July – Carlo Wagner, politician
- 30 July – Nico Ries, soldier and Chief of Defence
- 29 November - Mariette Kemmer, opera singer
- 10 December – Nicolas Schmit, politician
- 13 December – André Jung, actor

== Deaths ==
- 4 October – Prince Oscar, Duke of Gotland
- 22 October – Helen Buchholtz, composer
- 1 December – Aloyse Hentgen, resistance leader
- 17 December – Nicolas Petit, architect
- 29 December – Pierre Dupong, politician and Prime Minister
