= 1962 in Luxembourg =

- Decades: 1940s; 1950s; 1960s; 1970s; 1980s
- See also: History of Luxembourg; List of years in Luxembourg

The following lists events that happened during 1962 in the Grand Duchy of Luxembourg.

== Incumbents ==
Position	Incumbent
Grand Duke	Charlotte
Prime Minister	Pierre Werner
Deputy Prime Minister	Eugène Schaus
President of the Chamber of Deputies	Joseph Bech
President of the Council of State	Félix Welter
Mayor of Luxembourg City	Émile Hamilius

== Events ==
- 18 March – Luxembourg City hosts the Eurovision Song Contest 1962 after Jean-Claude Pascal's victory the previous year. Representing Luxembourg, Camillo Felgen finishes third with the song Petit bonhomme.
- 2 June – A law is passed encouraging foreign direct investment in Luxembourg by giving the government the power to grant tax breaks for foreign firms making capital investment.

== Births ==
- 15 April – Romain Schneider, politician
- 13 September – Michel Wolter, politician
- 21 December – Georges Christen, strongman
