= 1966 in Luxembourg =

- Decades: 1940s; 1950s; 1960s; 1970s; 1980s
- See also: History of Luxembourg; List of years in Luxembourg

The following lists events that happened during 1966 in the Grand Duchy of Luxembourg.

== Incumbents ==
Position	Incumbent
Grand Duke	Jean
Prime Minister	Pierre Werner
Deputy Prime Minister	Henry Cravatte
President of the Chamber of Deputies	Victor Bodson
President of the Council of State	Félix Welter
Mayor of Luxembourg City	Paul Wilwertz

== Events ==
- 29 January – The Luxembourg Compromise is reached to resolve an impasse in the European Union.
- 5 March – Luxembourg City hosts the Eurovision Song Contest 1966 after France Gall's victory the previous year. Representing Luxembourg, Michèle Torr finishes tenth with the song Ce soir je t'attendais.
- 21 March – The Economic and Social Council is created to aid industrial relations between employers, employees, and the government.

== Births ==
- 16 March – Félix Braz, politician
- 15 November – Octavie Modert, politician
