= 1961 in Luxembourg =

- Decades: 1940s; 1950s; 1960s; 1970s; 1980s
- See also: History of Luxembourg; List of years in Luxembourg

The following lists events that happened during 1961 in the Grand Duchy of Luxembourg.

== Incumbents ==
Position	Incumbent
Grand Duke	Charlotte
Prime Minister	Pierre Werner
Deputy Prime Minister	Eugène Schaus
President of the Chamber of Deputies	Joseph Bech
President of the Council of State	Félix Welter
Mayor of Luxembourg City	Émile Hamilius

== Events ==
=== January – March ===
- 18 March – Representing Luxembourg, Jean-Claude Pascal wins the Eurovision Song Contest 1961 with the song Nous les amoureux.

=== April – June ===
- 28 April – Grand Duchess Charlotte declares her eldest son, Hereditary Grand Duke Jean, to be her Lieutenant Representative.
- 5 May - Prince Félix is appointed to the Council of State.
- 30 May - Joseph Wolter is appointed to the Council of State
- 14 June - Joseph Kauffman is appointed to the Council of State

=== July – September ===
- 10 July - Félix Worré is appointed to the Council of State
- 17 July - Alex Bonn is appointed to the Council of State.
- 7 August - Paul Weber is appointed to the Council of State.
- 28 August - Victor Bodson is appointed to the Council of State.

=== October – December ===
- 8 October – At football, Luxembourg beats Portugal 4–2, recording Luxembourg's first victory in international football since 1951.

== Births ==
- 24 March – Marc Schaeffer, member of the Council of State
- 17 August – Lydia Mutsch, politician
