= 1954 in Luxembourg =

- Decades: 1930s; 1940s; 1950s; 1960s; 1970s
- See also: History of Luxembourg; List of years in Luxembourg

The following lists events that happened during 1954 in the Grand Duchy of Luxembourg.

== Incumbents ==
Position	Incumbent
Grand Duke	Charlotte
Prime Minister	Joseph Bech
President of the Chamber of Deputies	Émile Reuter
President of the Council of State	Félix Welter
Mayor of Luxembourg City	Émile Hamilius

== Events ==
- The 1954 World Fencing Championships are held in Luxembourg City.

=== January – March ===
- 1 January – D'Lëtzebuerger Land is launched as an independent weekly newspaper.

=== April – June ===
- 20 May – Elections are held to the Chamber of Deputies. The Christian Social People's Party gains 5 seats, while the Luxembourg Socialist Workers' Party and Democratic Party lose two each.
- 29 June The Bech-Bodson Ministry is expanded, with Pierre Werner, Émile Colling, and Paul Wilwertz appointed to the government.

== Births ==
- 2 February – Jean Colombera, politician
- 17 February – Archduchess Marie-Astrid of Austria
- 7 March – Lydie Lorang, judge and member of the Council of State
- 2 August – Walter Civitareale, composer
- 26 October – Raymond Petit, artist
- 17 November – Max Kohn, artist
- 9 December – Jean-Claude Juncker, politician and Prime Minister
- Marc Jaeger, judge

== Deaths ==
- 3 March – Léon Metzler, jurist and politician
- 15 May – Norbert Jacques, screenwriter
- 31 July – Antoinette, Crown Princess of Bavaria
