= 1958 in Luxembourg =

- Decades: 1930s; 1940s; 1950s; 1960s; 1970s
- See also: History of Luxembourg; List of years in Luxembourg

The following lists events that happened during 1958 in the Grand Duchy of Luxembourg.

== Incumbents ==
| Position | Incumbent |
|---|---|
| Grand Duke | Charlotte |
| Prime Minister | Joseph Bech (29 March); Pierre Frieden (from 29 March) |
| President of the Chamber of Deputies | Émile Reuter |
| President of the Council of State | Félix Welter |
| Mayor of Luxembourg City | Émile Hamilius |

== Events ==
=== January – March ===
- 20 January – Michel Rasquin resigns from the government to become Luxembourg's member of the inaugural European Commission, with responsibility for Transport.
- 1 February – Joseph Frieden replaces Joseph Bech as Prime Minister. He forms a new government, renewing the Christian Social People's Party's coalition with the Luxembourg Socialist Workers' Party.
- 3 February – Luxembourg, Belgium, and the Netherlands sign a treaty creating the Benelux Economic Union.
- 16 March – Representing Luxembourg, Solange Berry finishes ninth (and joint-last) in the Eurovision Song Contest 1958 with the song Un grand amour.

=== April – June ===
- 27 April – Luxembourg's European Commissioner, Michel Rasquin, dies.
- 18 June – Lambert Schaus is appointed to the European Commission, with responsibility for Transport, replacing Michel Rasquin, who died in April.

=== July – September ===
- 10 July – Luxembourg signs a convention with the German state of Rhineland-Palatinate on the construction of the Vianden Pumped Storage Plant.
- 19 July – Charly Gaul wins the 1958 Tour de France.
- 12 August – Louis Hencks is appointed to the Council of State, replacing Albert Wagner, who resigned in July.

=== October – December ===
- 31 December – Alfred Loesch resigns from the Council of State.

== Births ==
- 17 May – Pol Schmoetten, playwright
- 2 June – Camille Gira, politician
- 22 August – Sylvie Andrich-Duval, politician
- 28 September – François Biltgen, politician
- 3 October – Alex Bodry, politician

== Deaths ==
- 27 April – Michel Rasquin, politician and European Commissioner
- 27 December - Batty Fischer, amateur photographer
