= 1955 in Luxembourg =

- Decades: 1930s; 1940s; 1950s; 1960s; 1970s
- See also: History of Luxembourg; List of years in Luxembourg

The following lists events that happened during 1955 in the Grand Duchy of Luxembourg.

== Incumbents ==
Position	Incumbent
Grand Duke	Charlotte
Prime Minister	Joseph Bech
President of the Chamber of Deputies	Émile Reuter
President of the Council of State	Félix Welter
Mayor of Luxembourg City	Émile Hamilius

== Events ==
- 12 January – A law is passed granting amnesty for crimes committed against the state and laxening denazification.
- 1 March – Paul Thibeau is appointed to the Council of State.
- 1 March – François Huberty is appointed to the Council of State.
- 1 March – Roger Maul is appointed to the Council of State.
- 24 April – The Democratic Party is founded from the Democratic Group.
- 1 June – Joseph Bech leads a delegation to the three-day Messina Conference on European integration.

== Births ==
- 9 March - Yvon Lambert, photographer
- 4 April – Ali Kaes, politician and trade unionist
- 16 April – Henri, Grand Duke of Luxembourg
- 27 April – Léa Linster, chef
- 12 June – Georges Bach, politician and trade unionist
