= 1957 in Luxembourg =

- Decades: 1930s; 1940s; 1950s; 1960s; 1970s
- See also: History of Luxembourg; List of years in Luxembourg

The following lists events that happened during 1957 in the Grand Duchy of Luxembourg.

== Incumbents ==
Position	Incumbent
Grand Duke	Charlotte
Prime Minister	Joseph Bech
President of the Chamber of Deputies	Émile Reuter
President of the Council of State	Félix Welter
Mayor of Luxembourg City	Émile Hamilius

== Events ==
- 16 March – Representing Luxembourg, Danièle Dupré finishes fourth in the Eurovision Song Contest 1958 with the song Amours mortes (tant de peine).
- 25 March – Luxembourg is one of the six founder signatories of the Treaty of Rome, creating the European Economic Community.
- 29 July – Health insurance is made mandatory for all employees.
- 31 December – The new title of 'Secretary of State' is created for junior members of the government.

== Births ==
- 1 February – Jean-Marie Halsdorf, politician
- 9 February – Camille Kerger, musician
- 15 May – Prince Jean of Luxembourg
- 15 May – Princess Margaretha of Liechtenstein
- 29 May – Yvette Gastauer-Claire, sculptor
- 9 July – Roland Bombardella, soldier and athlete
- 13 July – Eugène Urbany, cyclist
