= 1971 in Luxembourg =

- Decades: 1950s; 1960s; 1970s; 1980s; 1990s
- See also: History of Luxembourg; List of years in Luxembourg

The following lists events that happened during 1971 in Luxembourg.

== Incumbents ==
Position	Incumbent
Grand Duke	Jean
Prime Minister	Pierre Werner
Deputy Prime Minister	Eugène Schaus
President of the Chamber of Deputies	Pierre Grégoire
President of the Council of State	Maurice Sevenig
Mayor of Luxembourg City	Colette Flesch

== Events ==
- 13 February – Jean Hengen replaces the retiring Léon Lommel as Bishop of Luxembourg.
- 3 April – Representing Luxembourg, Monique Melsen finishes thirteenth in the Eurovision Song Contest 1971 with the song Pomme, pomme, pomme.
- 12 November – A law is passed granting wives the right to enter into legal agreements without the consent of their husbands.

== Births ==
- 27 November – Claude Meisch, politician
- 26 December – Tom Bimmermann, composer

== Deaths ==
- 7 March – Émile Hamilius, politician
