= 1951 in Luxembourg =

- Decades: 1930s; 1940s; 1950s; 1960s; 1970s
- See also: History of Luxembourg; List of years in Luxembourg

The following lists events that happened during 1951 in the Grand Duchy of Luxembourg.

== Incumbents ==
Position	Incumbent
Grand Duke	Charlotte
Prime Minister	Pierre Dupong
President of the Chamber of Deputies	Émile Reuter
President of the Council of State	Léon Kauffman
Mayor of Luxembourg City	Émile Hamilius

== Events ==
=== January – March ===
- 20 March – The United States is given right to use the land of the Luxembourg American Cemetery and Memorial at Hamm in perpetuity.
- Early February - Luxembourg troops arrive in South Korea as, alongside Belgian units, they form a platoon of Belgian United Nations Command during the Korean War.

=== April – June ===
- 18 April – Luxembourg is one of six founder signatories of the Treaty of Paris, which establishes the European Coal and Steel Community.
- 25 April – Prince Jean is appointed to the Council of State, replacing Prince Felix.
- 29 May – Societe Electrique de l'Our is founded.
- 3 June – Elections are held to the Chamber of Deputies in the Centre and Nord constituencies. The Luxembourg Socialist Workers' Party (LSAP) gains 4 seats, taking it to nineteen seats, just behind the Christian Social People's Party (CSV).

=== July – September ===
- 3 July – After the LSAP's gains in the election on 3 June, the CSV replaces its coalition partner, the Democratic Party, with Victor Bodson as Deputy Prime Minister in the new government.
- 17 August – Prince Sigvard, Duke of Uppland, Carl Johan Bernadotte, and Prince Lennart, Duke of Småland are created Counts Bernadotte af Wisborg.
- 29 August – A law is passed making health insurance mandatory for employees and civil servants.
- September - First contingent of Luxembourg soldiers return from the Korean War.

=== October – December ===
- 9–13 October - 6 Luxembourg soldiers fight at the Battle of Haktang-ni during the Korean War.
- 4 November – The Luxembourg national football team beats Finland 3-0: its last international victory for ten years.
- 26 November – Charles Léon Hammes is appointed to the Council of State.

== Births ==
- 24 February – Monique Melsen, singer
- 27 April – Viviane Reding, politician
- 26 May – Michel, 14th Prince of Ligne
- 3 August – Lucien Weiler, politician
- 20 September – Jhemp Hoscheit, writer
- 30 December – Paul Dahm, composer

== Deaths ==
- 13 July – Nik Welter, writer and politician
