= 1956 in Luxembourg =

- Decades: 1930s; 1940s; 1950s; 1960s; 1970s
- See also: History of Luxembourg; List of years in Luxembourg

The following lists events that happened during 1956 in the Grand Duchy of Luxembourg.

== Incumbents ==
Position	Incumbent
Grand Duke	Charlotte
Prime Minister	Joseph Bech
President of the Chamber of Deputies	Émile Reuter
President of the Council of State	Félix Welter
Mayor of Luxembourg City	Émile Hamilius

== Events ==
=== April – June ===
- 9 May – Princess Elisabeth marries Franz, Duke of Hohenberg.
- 24 May – Representing Luxembourg, Michèle Arnaud appears in the Eurovision Song Contest 1958 with the song Ne crois pas. No rankings are stated except the winner: Lys Assia of Switzerland.
- 10 June – Charly Gaul wins the 1956 Giro d'Italia.

=== July – September ===
- 27 July - The Constitution of Luxembourg is amended to make the terms of all members of the Chamber of Deputies expire on the first Sunday of June 1959. As a result, all members would be elected at the same time, rather than in partial elections.

=== October – December ===
- 29 September - Entry into service of the electrified railway lines between Luxembourg City and Thionville, and Luxembourg City and Arlon.
- 25 October - The Constitution of Luxembourg is amended in two places to allow for the delegation of constitutional powers to international organisations, in preparation for the creation of the European Economic Community.
- 27 October - The Saar Treaty is signed in Luxembourg, allowing for the transfer of the Saarland to West Germany.

== Births ==
- 22 March – Maria Teresa, Grand Duchess of Luxembourg
- 11 May - Claude Lenners, composer
- 13 August – Gast Waltzing, musician
- 5 September – Marianne Majerus, photographer
- 13 September – Lucien Lux, politician
- 16 October – François Bausch, politician
- 17 November – Gaston Reinig, soldier and Chief of Defence

== Deaths ==
- 13 March – Albert Simon, illustrator
- 21 October – Joseph Laurent Philippe, bishop
