= 1960 in Luxembourg =

- Decades: 1940s; 1950s; 1960s; 1970s; 1980s
- See also: History of Luxembourg; List of years in Luxembourg

The following lists events that happened during 1960 in the Grand Duchy of Luxembourg.

== Incumbents ==
Position	Incumbent
Grand Duke	Charlotte
Prime Minister	Pierre Werner
Deputy Prime Minister	Eugène Schaus
President of the Chamber of Deputies	Joseph Bech
President of the Council of State	Félix Welter
Mayor of Luxembourg City	Émile Hamilius

== Events ==
- 29 March – Representing Luxembourg, Camillo Felgen finishes thirteenth (and last) in the Eurovision Song Contest 1960 with the song So laang we's du do bast.
- 4 July – The completed grounds of the Luxembourg American Cemetery and Memorial are dedicated.
- 17 September – King Bhumibol of Thailand makes a state visit to Luxembourg, lasting until 19 September.

== Births ==
- 30 January – Claude Wiseler, politician
- 20 April – Danièle Kaber, athlete
- 1 August – Robby Langers, footballer
- 20 September – Fonsy Grethen, billiards player
- 26 November – Claude Turmes, politician
- 4 December – Eugène Berger, politician and climber
- 21 December – Bady Minck, artist & filmmaker
