= 1948 in Luxembourg =

- Decades: 1920s; 1930s; 1940s; 1950s; 1960s
- See also: History of Luxembourg; List of years in Luxembourg

The following lists events that happened during 1948 in the Grand Duchy of Luxembourg.

== Incumbents ==
Position	Incumbent
Grand Duke	Charlotte
Prime Minister	Pierre Dupong
President of the Chamber of Deputies	Émile Reuter
President of the Council of State	Léon Kauffman
Mayor of Luxembourg City	Émile Hamilius

== Events ==
=== January – March ===
- 9 January – The Luxembourg Airlines Company is founded.
- 29 January – The first conference of Benelux foreign ministers is held, in Luxembourg City.
- 2 February – Luxembourg Airlines Company makes its first flight, from Luxembourg – Findel to Paris – Le Bourget.
- 17 March – Luxembourg signs the Treaty of Brussels.

=== April – June ===
- 3 April – The Obermosel-Zeitung and l'Unio'n cease publication and are merged into the new Lëtzebuerger Journal.
- 5 April – The Lëtzebuerger Journal begins publication.
- 6 June – Partial elections are held to the Chamber of Deputies, resulting in gains for the Luxembourg Socialist Workers' Party at the expense of the Christian Social People's Party

=== July – September ===
- 14 July – In the aftermath of the previous month's election, the government is reshuffled, with Nicolas Margue and Lambert Schaus replaced by Pierre Frieden and Aloyse Hentgen.
- 26 July – At the 1948 Summer Olympics, the Luxembourg national football team records its largest-ever victory, beating Afghanistan 6–0.
- 29 July – The 1948 Summer Olympics proper begin, with 45 competitors from Luxembourg. None wins a medal.
- 4 August – Émile Raus, Lambert Schaus, and André Origer are appointed to the Council of State, replacing Michel Rasquin and Pierre Frieden.

== Births ==
- 30 January – Aly Jaerling, politician
- 7 May – Marc Agosta, athlete
- 19 November – Robert Biever, member of the Council of State

== Deaths ==
- 8 November – Jean-Pierre Muller, cyclist
