= 1947 in Luxembourg =

- Decades: 1920s; 1930s; 1940s; 1950s; 1960s
- See also: History of Luxembourg; List of years in Luxembourg

The following lists events that happened during 1947 in the Grand Duchy of Luxembourg.

== Incumbents ==
Position	Incumbent
Grand Duke	Charlotte
Prime Minister	Pierre Dupong
President of the Chamber of Deputies	Émile Reuter
President of the Council of State	Léon Kauffman
Mayor of Luxembourg City	Émile Hamilius

== Events ==
=== January – March ===
- 20 January – Pierre Krier dies, precipitating a crisis in the National Union Government.
- 12 February – The National Union Government tenders its resignation.
- 1 March – A centre-right government is formed between the Christian Social People's Party and the Democratic Group under incumbent Prime Minister Pierre Dupong.

=== April – June ===
- 16 April – The Organisation for Economic Co-operation and Development is founded, with Luxembourg as one of the sixteen founding members.
- 16 April – The government commits itself to seeking 11.1bn francs in war reparations.
- 28 April – Eugène Rodenbourg is appointed to the Council of State, replacing Jacques Delahaye and Robert Als.
- 16 June – A law is passed granting Société Nationale des Chemins de Fer Luxembourgeois management of the national railway network for 99 years.

=== October – December ===
- 20 October – A law is passed conferring family welfare benefits on all employees.

== Births ==
- 31 August – Guy Rewenig, writer
- 19 September Roger Gilson, cyclist
- 20 December – Georges Schroeder, member of the Council of State

== Deaths ==
- 4 March – Pierre Krier, politician
- 13 June – Frantz Funck-Brentano, historian
- 22 August – Aline de Saint-Hubert, philanthropist
