= 1963 in Luxembourg =

- Decades: 1940s; 1950s; 1960s; 1970s; 1980s
- See also: History of Luxembourg; List of years in Luxembourg

The following lists events that happened during 1963 in the Grand Duchy of Luxembourg.

== Incumbents ==
Position	Incumbent
Grand Duke	Charlotte
Prime Minister	Pierre Werner
Deputy Prime Minister	Eugène Schaus
President of the Chamber of Deputies	Joseph Bech
President of the Council of State	Félix Welter
Mayor of Luxembourg City	Émile Hamilius

== Events ==
=== January – March ===
- 23 March – Representing Luxembourg, Nana Mouskouri finishes eighth in the Eurovision Song Contest 1963 with the song À force de prier.

=== April – June ===
- 29 April – Grand Duchess Charlotte pays a state visit to the United States until 4 May.

=== July – September ===
- 9 October – Jeunesse Esch beat FC Haka 4–0 to become the only Luxembourgian side to progress to the last sixteen of the European Cup.
- 30 October – The national football team shocks the Netherlands by winning 2–1 in the second qualifying round for the 1964 European Nations' Cup, progressing 3–2 on aggregate.

=== October – December ===
- 4 November – Vice President Lyndon B. Johnson visits Luxembourg.
- 18 December – Luxembourg is knocked out at the final stage of qualifying for the 1964 European Nations' Cup, losing a play-off against Denmark 1–0, having drawn 5–5 with the Danes on aggregate.

== Births ==
- 12 March – Marc Angel, politician
- 10 April – Marc Spautz, trade unionist and politician
- 1 May – Prince Guillaume of Luxembourg
- 4 July – Ni Xia Lian, table tennis player
- 18 July – Marc Girardelli, skier
- 16 September – Luc Frieden, politician

== Deaths ==
- 29 March - Michel Stoffel, painter
- 26 August – Pierre Clemens, cyclist
