= 1950 in Luxembourg =

- Decades: 1930s; 1940s; 1950s; 1960s; 1970s
- See also: History of Luxembourg; List of years in Luxembourg

The following lists events that happened during 1950 in the Grand Duchy of Luxembourg.

== Incumbents ==
Position	Incumbent
Grand Duke	Charlotte
Prime Minister	Pierre Dupong
President of the Chamber of Deputies	Émile Reuter
President of the Council of State	Léon Kauffman
Mayor of Luxembourg City	Émile Hamilius

== Events ==
- Unknown – Goodyear tyre factory is opened at Colmar-Berg.

=== April – June ===
- 25 June – The Korean War begins. Luxembourg pledges its support to the United Nations. Soldiers from Luxembourg will form a platoon of A Company, Belgian United Nations Command.

=== July – September ===
- 17 August – Princess Alix marries Antoine Maria Joachim Lamoral, 14th Prince of Ligne.
- 2 September – François Simon replaces Aloyse Hentgen as Minister for Economic Affairs and Agriculture.

=== October – December ===
- 2 October – The first of Luxembourg's volunteer soldiers departs for the Korean War.
- 23 October – Wirtgen Ferdinand is appointed to the Council of State.

== Births ==
- 22 January – Marie-Josée Jacobs, politician
- 21 April – Pierre Mores, member of the Council of State
- 26 April – Jeannot Krecké, politician
- 19 May – Anne Brasseur, politician
- 15 June – Jup Weber, politician
- 29 June – Gaston Gibéryen, politician
- 13 July – Georges Wohlfart, politician
- 16 July – Henri Grethen, politician
- 5 August – Lucien Didier, cyclist
- 11 October – Mady Delvaux-Stehres, politician
- 26 October – Nico Braun, footballer
- 19 December – Jean Portante, writer

== Deaths ==
- 1 February – Pierre Prüm, politician and Prime Minister
