= 1973 in Luxembourg =

- Decades: 1950s; 1960s; 1970s; 1980s; 1990s
- See also: History of Luxembourg; List of years in Luxembourg

The following lists events that happened during 1973 in the Grand Duchy of Luxembourg.

== Incumbents ==
Position	Incumbent
Grand Duke	Jean
Prime Minister	Pierre Werner
Deputy Prime Minister	Eugène Schaus
President of the Chamber of Deputies	Pierre Grégoire
President of the Council of State	Maurice Sevenig
Mayor of Luxembourg City	Colette Flesch

== Events ==
=== January – March ===
- 9 January - The European Court of Justice building is opened in Kirchberg, Luxembourg City.

=== April – June ===
- 4 April – Pierre Werner extends the operating concession to Compagnie Luxembourgeoise de Télédiffusion, now RTL Group, until 31 December 1995.
- 7 April – Luxembourg City hosts the Eurovision Song Contest 1973 after Vicky Leandros' victory the previous year. Representing Luxembourg, Anne-Marie David successfully defends Luxembourg's title, winning with the song Tu te reconnaîtras.
- 20 June – Ernest Arendt is appointed to the Council of State.

=== October – December ===
- 9 October – General strike held across Luxembourg.
- October – Cargolux purchases its first jet aircraft, a DC-8 Series 61.

== Births ==
- 29 January - Su-Mei Tse, musician, photographer, sculptor
- 3 March – Xavier Bettel, politician
- 14 November – Marc Meyers, musician

== Deaths ==
- 14 February – Émile Reuter, politician
- 25 March – Edward Steichen, photographer
- 30 March – William J. Kroll, metallurgist
- 1 May – Jules Mersch, writer
- 17 November – Lou Koster, composer
