= 1946 in Luxembourg =

- Decades: 1920s; 1930s; 1940s; 1950s; 1960s
- See also: History of Luxembourg; List of years in Luxembourg

The following lists events that happened during 1946 in the Grand Duchy of Luxembourg.

== Incumbents ==
Position	Incumbent
Grand Duke	Charlotte
Prime Minister	Pierre Dupong
President of the Chamber of Deputies	Émile Reuter
President of the Council of State	Léon Kauffman
Mayor of Luxembourg City	Gaston Diderich (until 29 April); Émile Hamilius (from 29 April)

== Events ==
=== April – June ===
- 17 April – Luxembourg signs a convention with France and Belgium to place the Luxembourg railway network in the hands of the Société Nationale des Chemins de Fer Luxembourgeois, in which France and Belgium each take a 24.5% stake.
- 29 April – The Mayor of Luxembourg City, Gaston Diderich, dies in office and is succeeded by Émile Hamilius.
- 14 May – Société Nationale des Chemins de Fer Luxembourgeois is founded.
- 13 June – Charles Marx dies in a car crash. He was replaced in the government by Dominique Urbany eight days later.

=== July – September ===
- 14 July – Former British Prime Minister Winston Churchill visits Luxembourg for two days.
- 29 August – In a cabinet reshuffle, the independent Guillaume Konsbruck is replaced by the CSV's Lambert Schaus.

=== October – December ===
- 28 November – Former Prime Minister Pierre Prüm is sentenced to four years in prison for collaboration with Nazi Germany.

== Births ==
- 6 January – Victor Gillen, member of the Council of State
- 22 February – Marc Fischbach, politician
- 6 April – Mario Hirsch, journalist
- 7 April – Léon Krier, architect
- 4 December – Pierre Even, composer

== Deaths ==
- 29 April – Gaston Diderich, politician
- 13 June – Charles Marx, politician
- 24 October – Hubert Loutsch, politician and former Prime Minister
