= 1974 in Luxembourg =

- Decades: 1950s; 1960s; 1970s; 1980s; 1990s
- See also: History of Luxembourg; List of years in Luxembourg

The following lists events that happened during 1974 in the Grand Duchy of Luxembourg.

== Incumbents ==
Position	Incumbent
Grand Duke	Jean
Prime Minister	Pierre Werner (until 15 June); Gaston Thorn (from 15 June)
Deputy Prime Minister	Eugène Schaus (until 15 June); Raymond Vouel (from 15 June)
President of the Chamber of Deputies	Pierre Grégoire; Antoine Wehenkel
President of the Council of State	Maurice Sevenig
Mayor of Luxembourg City	Colette Flesch

== Events ==
=== January – March ===
- January – Cargolux takes over Loftleiðir's maintenance and engineering departments, which were subsequently transferred from New York City to Luxembourg City.
- 10 January – Paul Beghin is appointed to the Council of State.
- 4 February – A law reforming marriage is passed.
- 20 March – A law on planning and regional development is passed in an attempt to reverse seventy years of depopulation in the countryside.

=== April – June ===
- 6 April – Having won the previous year's competition, Luxembourg is offered the chance to host the Eurovision Song Contest 1974, but RTL turns down the opportunity on the grounds of cost. Thus, it is held in the United Kingdom instead. Representing Luxembourg, Ireen Sheer finishes fourth with the song Bye bye, I Love You.
- 28 April – Cargolux opens its first hangar, at Luxembourg-Findel.
- 6 May – A law concerning industrial relations is passed, requiring all firms employing more than 150 people to have 'Mixed Committees' to represent employees.
- 26 May – Legislative elections are held. In the Chamber of Deputies, the DP and the newly formed SDP pick up three and five seats respectively.
- 15 June - A new government, under Gaston Thorn of the Democratic Party in coalition with the Luxembourg Socialist Workers' Party takes office. The Christian Social People's Party goes into opposition for the first time since its formation.

=== October – December ===
- 26 November - Capital punishment is formally abolished.
- 29 November – Johny Lahure is appointed to the Council of State.

== Births ==
- 5 October – Jeff Strasser, footballer

== Deaths ==
- 25 December – Louis Hencks, member of the Council of State
