= 1975 in Luxembourg =

- Decades: 1950s; 1960s; 1970s; 1980s; 1990s
- See also: History of Luxembourg; List of years in Luxembourg

The following lists events that happened during 1975 in the Grand Duchy of Luxembourg.

== Incumbents ==
Position	Incumbent
Grand Duke	Jean
Prime Minister	Gaston Thorn
Deputy Prime Minister	Raymond Vouel
President of the Chamber of Deputies	Antoine Wehenkel; René Van Den Bulcke
President of the Council of State	Maurice Sevenig (until 26 June); Emile Raus (from 26 June)
Mayor of Luxembourg City	Colette Flesch

== Events ==
=== January – March ===
- 6 February - A law is passed legalising divorce by mutual consent.
- 22 March – Representing Luxembourg, Geraldine Branigan finishes fifth in the Eurovision Song Contest 1975 with the song Toi.

=== July – September ===
- 21 July - Annette Schwall-Lacroix is appointed to the Council of State.
- 16 September - Prime Minister Gaston Thorn is appointed President of the United Nations General Assembly.

=== Unknown ===
- Gross domestic product falls by 6.1%, mostly due to a collapse in the steel price.

== Births ==
- 17 October – Anne Kremer, tennis player

== Deaths ==
- 5 February - Foni Tissen, artist
- 8 March – Joseph Bech, politician
- 8 May – Pol Albrecht, composer
- 1 October - Eugène Rodenbourg, member of the Council of State

== Bibliography ==
- Thewes, Guy (2011). Les gouvernements du Grand-Duché de Luxembourg depuis 1848 (PDF) (in French) (2011 ed.). Luxembourg City: Service Information et Presse. ISBN 978-2-87999-156-6.
