= 1976 in Luxembourg =

- Decades: 1950s; 1960s; 1970s; 1980s; 1990s
- See also: History of Luxembourg; List of years in Luxembourg

The following lists events that happened during 1976 in the Grand Duchy of Luxembourg.

== Incumbents ==
| Position | Incumbent |
|---|---|
| Grand Duke | Jean |
| Prime Minister | Gaston Thorn |
| Deputy Prime Minister | Raymond Vouel (until 21 July); Bernard Berg (from 21 July) |
| President of the Chamber of Deputies | René Van Den Bulcke |
| President of the Council of State | Emile Raus (until 25 June); Albert Goldmann (26 June – 4 December); Ferdinand Wirtgen (from 20 December) |
| Mayor of Luxembourg City | Colette Flesch |

== Events ==
=== January – March ===
- 11 March - A law establishing state aid for newspapers is signed into law.

=== April – June ===
- 3 April – Representing Luxembourg, Juergen Marcus finishes fourteenth in the Eurovision Song Contest 1976 with the song Chansons Pour Ceux Qui S'aiment.
- 30 May - An explosion caused by the release of gasoline tears through a block of houses in Pfaffenthal, killing 3 and injuring at least 20.

=== July – September ===
- 21 July - Raymond Vouel resigns as Deputy Prime Minister to take up his position as European Commissioner for Competition. He is replaced by Bernard Berg.

=== October – December ===
- 15 December - Georges Thorn is appointed to the Council of State, replacing Norbert Droessaert, who resigned in November.
- 18 December – 10,000 public sector workers go on strike.

== Births ==
- 4 January – Benoît Joachim, cyclist

== Deaths ==
- 18 March – Nicolas Margue, politician
- 25 June - Joseph Wolter, member of the Council of State
- 10 August - Lambert Schaus, politician and diplomat
- 8 December – Albert Borschette, diplomat and writer
- 22 December - Paul Weber, member of the Councir of State
