= 1977 in Luxembourg =

- Decades: 1950s; 1960s; 1970s; 1980s; 1990s
- See also: History of Luxembourg; List of years in Luxembourg

The following lists events that happened during 1977 in the Grand Duchy of Luxembourg.

== Incumbents ==
Position	Incumbent
Grand Duke	Jean
Prime Minister	Gaston Thorn
Deputy Prime Minister	Bernard Berg
President of the Chamber of Deputies	René Van Den Bulcke
President of the Council of State	Ferdinand Wirtgen
Mayor of Luxembourg City	Colette Flesch

== Events ==
=== January – March ===
- 18 January – Lucien Kraus is appointed to the Council of State.

=== April – June ===
- 3 April – Luxembourg adopts Central European Summer Time regularly for the first time.
- 7 May – Representing Luxembourg, Anne-Marie Besse finishes sixteenth in the Eurovision Song Contest 1977 with the song Frère Jacques.
- 3 June – The Sidor waste-to-energy incinerator at Leudelange is inaugurated.
- 12 June – The Netherlands' Bert Pronk wins the 1977 Tour de Luxembourg.
- 22 June – The government abandons plan to build a nuclear power plant at Remerschen, due to fears that the country wouldn't have enough police to protect the site from protestors.

=== July – September ===
- 29 July – Cornel Meder is appointed to the Council of State.
- 2 August – A law creating the Société nationale de Crédit et d'Investissement is passed.
- 16 September – Marcel Mart leaves the government to join the European Court of Auditors, and is replaced by Josy Barthel.

=== Unknown ===
- At the conference of the International Telecommunication Union, in Geneva, Luxembourg is assigned five frequencies for satellite broadcasting, furthering the government's move towards making Luxembourg a leader in satellite telecommunications.
- Jeunesse Esch wins the 1976-77 National Division title.

== Births ==
- 20 August – Stéphane Gillet, footballer
- 5 November – Christian Poos, cyclist
- 25 November - Max Jacoby, filmmaker

== Deaths ==
- 26 July – Prince Charles of Luxembourg (1927–1977)
