= 1970 in Luxembourg =

- Decades: 1950s; 1960s; 1970s; 1980s; 1990s
- See also: History of Luxembourg; List of years in Luxembourg

The following lists events that happened during 1970 in the Grand Duchy of Luxembourg.

== Incumbents ==
Position	Incumbent
Grand Duke	Jean
Prime Minister	Pierre Werner
Deputy Prime Minister	Eugène Schaus
President of the Chamber of Deputies	Pierre Grégoire
President of the Council of State	Maurice Sevenig
Mayor of Luxembourg City	Colette Flesch

== Events ==
=== January – March ===
- 1 January - Value added tax (TVA) is introduced at 8%, with a reduced rate of 4%.
- 4 March – Cargolux is founded.
- 21 March – Representing Luxembourg, David Alexandre Winter finishes twelfth (and last) in the Eurovision Song Contest 1970 with the song Je Suis Tombé Du Ciel. It is the first and (so far) only occasion on which Luxembourg has scored 'nul points'.

=== April – June ===
- 20 May - Luxembourg and Portugal sign a treaty governing the growing population of Portuguese Luxembourgers.
- 28 May - Luxembourg and Yugoslavia sign a treaty governing the migration of Yugoslavs to Luxembourg.

=== October – December ===
- 11 November - Alfred Loesch is appointed to the Council of State.
- 2 December – One of Cargolux's two CL-44's crashes in East Pakistan while conducting a humanitarian airlift, killing four crew members and four villagers.
- 9 December - Legislation sets the workweek at 40 hours.

== Births ==
- 16 August - Patrick Santer, politician

== Deaths ==
- 8 April – Felix of Bourbon-Parma, prince consort
