= 1949 in Luxembourg =

- Decades: 1920s; 1930s; 1940s; 1950s; 1960s
- See also: History of Luxembourg; List of years in Luxembourg

The following lists events that happened during 1949 in the Grand Duchy of Luxembourg.

== Incumbents ==
Position	Incumbent
Grand Duke	Charlotte
Prime Minister	Pierre Dupong
President of the Chamber of Deputies	Émile Reuter
President of the Council of State	Léon Kauffman
Mayor of Luxembourg City	Émile Hamilius

== Events ==
- 4 April – Luxembourg signs the North Atlantic Treaty, becoming a founder member of NATO.

== Births ==
- 23 April – Lydie Err, politician
- 27 April – Jean Asselborn, politician
- 12 May – Robert Mehlen, politician
- 10 July – René Kollwelter, politician
- 1 October – Yves Mersch, banker
- 21 November – Alain Meyer, President of the Council of State

== Deaths ==
- 13 March – Auguste Liesch, politician
