= 1972 in Luxembourg =

- Decades: 1950s; 1960s; 1970s; 1980s; 1990s
- See also: History of Luxembourg; List of years in Luxembourg

The following lists events that happened during 1972 in the Grand Duchy of Luxembourg.

== Incumbents ==
Position	Incumbent
Grand Duke	Jean
Prime Minister	Pierre Werner
Deputy Prime Minister	Eugène Schaus
President of the Chamber of Deputies	Pierre Grégoire
President of the Council of State	Maurice Sevenig
Mayor of Luxembourg City	Colette Flesch

== Events ==
=== January – March ===
- 9 January - The Palais de Justice, housing the European Court of Justice, is opened on the Kirchberg plateau, Luxembourg City, marking the start of the development of the 'European quarter'.
- 25 March – Representing Luxembourg, Vicky Leandros wins the Eurovision Song Contest 1972 with the song Apres Toi.

=== April – June ===
- 12 April - The government buys Bourscheid Castle, which had been declared an historic monument in 1936.

=== July – September ===
- 19 September - Madeleine Frieden is forced to resign as secretary of state. Future Prime Minister Jacques Santer is brought into the government.

=== October – December ===
- 22 October – The Luxembourg national football team beats Turkey 2–0 in Luxembourg City, recording Luxembourg's first victory in international football since 1969.
- 24 October – Robert Schaack is appointed to the Council of State.
- 11 November – Fernand Zurn is appointed to the Council of State.
- 24 November – Joseph Foog is appointed to the Council of State.
- 7 December – Edmond Reuter is appointed to the Council of State.
- 12 December - A law is passed on marriage, regulating the rights and responsibilities of wives.
- 19 November – Albert Goedert is appointed to the Council of State.
- 22 December - The original Belgium-Luxembourg Economic Union treaty expires, after fifty years. It is renewed for another ten.
