= Tom Bimmermann =

Luxembourgish composer

Tom Bimmermann (born December 26, 1971) is a Luxembourgish composer.

== Career ==
Bimmermann studied from 1980 to 1992 at the Utrecht Conservatory. There he studied harmony, counterpoint, fugue, and the musical aesthetics of a piano. From 1993 until 1996, he studied at the Mozarteum in Salzburg, obtaining a Symphony Orchestra Conductor diploma. A member of The Luxembourg Society for Contemporary Music, his film scores include Verso (2009), Monster Kids (2008), Brotherhood of Blood (2007), and Why.

== Works ==
- Thème et Variations pour piano 1989 11'
- Symphonie N° 2 en re majeur 1989-91 21' 1.2.2.2. - 2.2.0.0. - timp, perc(2), archi
- Klaviertrio 1992 14'
- Letzebuerg an Europa 1992 8' Orchestre d'harmonie
- Pour Anne 1994 7' piano solo
- Quatuor à cordes en do majeur 1999 17'
- Intermezzo 1999 5' for orchestre à cordes
- Symphonic Muse 2008
