= Mario Hirsch =

Luxembourgish political scientist and journalist (1949–2023)

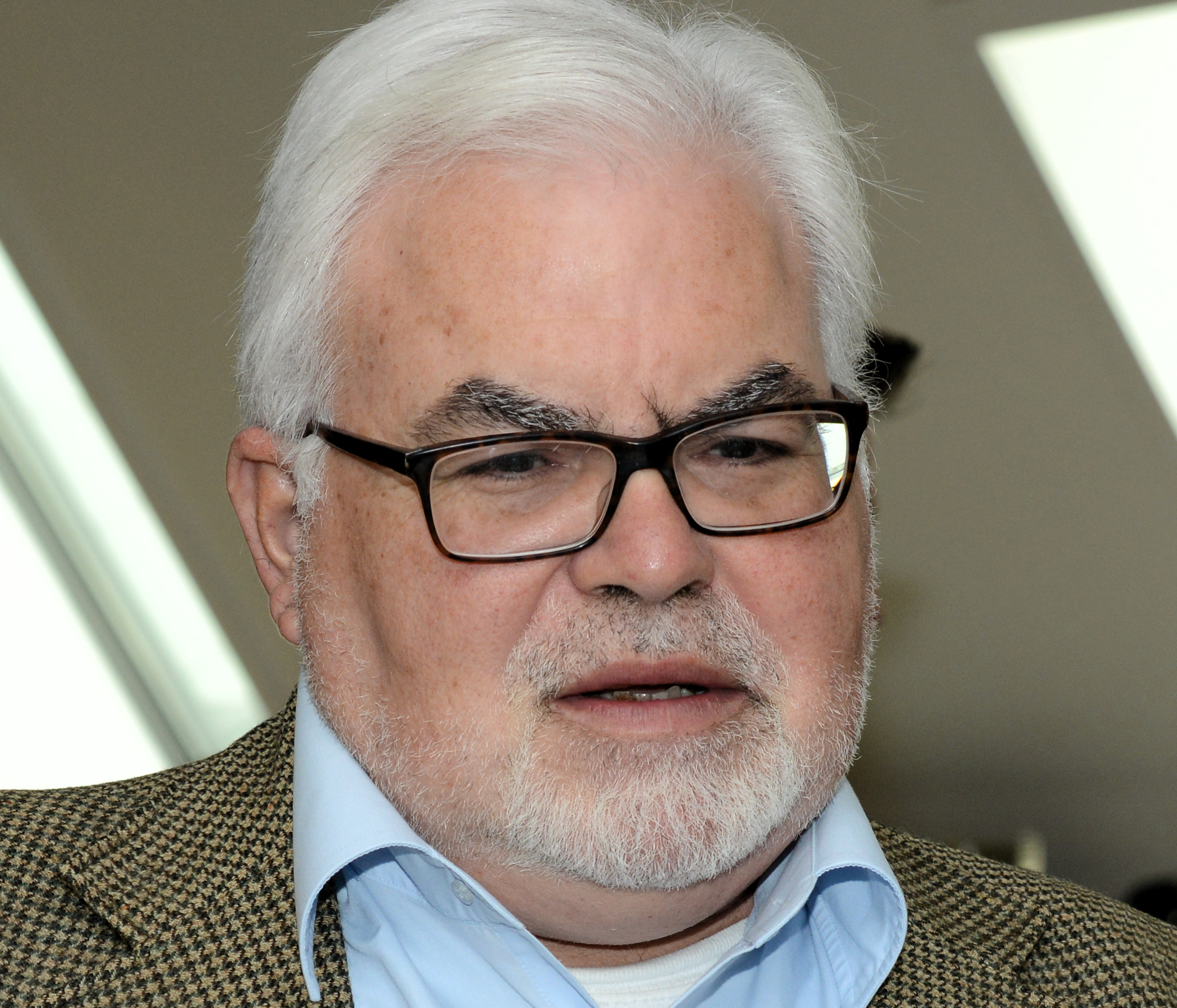
Hirsch in 2014

Mario Hirsch (6 April 1949 – 24 July 2023) was a Luxembourgish political scientist and journalist.

Hirsch received his PhD at Fondation Nationale des Sciences Politiques. He began lecturing at the Institut d'études politiques de Strasbourg. He became personal advisor to Prime Minister Gaston Thorn in 1974: a position that he held for four years. He then went back to lecturing, including at Université Laval in Canada, and Babeş-Bolyai University and University of Bucharest in Romania.

In 1983, he began working for Clay T. Whitehead, who had left Hughes Aircraft to found the company that would go on to become SES. He was secretary of the Democratic Party's delegation in the Chamber of Deputies from 1986 to 1996. An ally of Charles Goerens, Hirsch left the position after Goerens was removed as party President.

Luxembourg held the Presidency of the Council of the European Union in the second half of 1997, and Hirsch worked with Miguel Angel Moratinos, the European Union Special Representative for the Middle East Peace Process, as the presidency's liaison officer. From 1998 to 2006, Hirsch was editor of the weekly d'Lëtzebuerger Land. From 2006 to February 2011, he was the director of the Pierre Werner Institute, based at Neimënster Abbey. From June 2011, Hirsch was Visiting Senior Research Fellow at the EU Institute for Security Studies, an EU Agency based in Paris, where he was doing research on soft power as a component on European Foreign and Security Policies.

Mario Hirsch died on 24 July 2023, at the age of 74.
