= Jean-Louis Margue =

Luxembourgish footballer

Personal information
- Date of birth: 9 August 1952 (age 74)
- Position: Defender

Senior career*
Years	Team	Apps	(Gls)
1968–1983	Progrès Niederkorn		

International career
1975–1979	Luxembourg	16	(0)
- * Club domestic league appearances and goals

Jean-Louis Margue (born 9 August 1952) is a retired Luxembourgish football defender.
