= Christine Doerner =

Luxembourgish politician (born 1952)

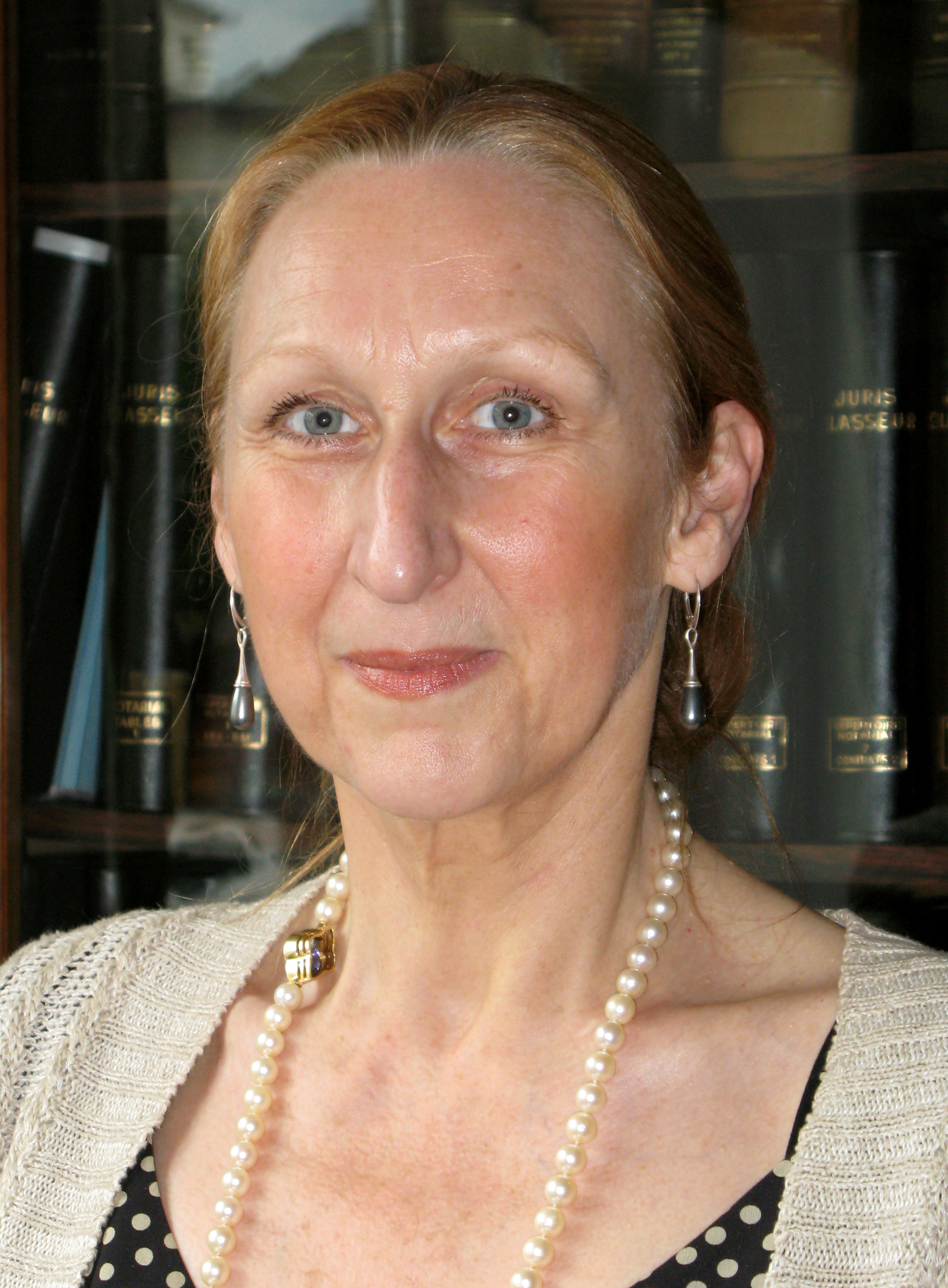
Christine Doerner

Christine Doerner (born 18 July 1952) is a Luxembourgish politician, advocate, and notary. She was a member of the Chamber of Deputies from 2004 to 2013, and has also sat as a member of Bettembourg communal council since 2000. She has been a member of the Christian Social People's Party since 1974.
