= Helen Buchholtz =

Luxembourgish composer

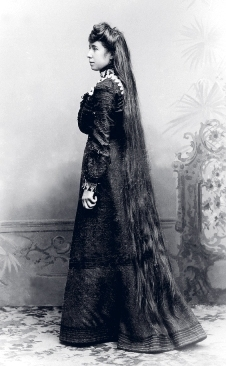
- Born: 24 November 1877; Esch-sur-Alzette, Luxembourg
- Died: 22 October 1953 (aged 75); Luxembourg City, Luxembourg
- Occupation: Composer

Charlotte Helena Geiger-Buchholtz (24 November 1877 – 22 October 1953) was a Luxembourgish composer. She left around 136 compositions in manuscript, including 53 Lieder (settings of Luxembourgish, German, and French texts), nineteen choral works, fourteen piano sonatas, 38 character pieces and dances for piano, eight works for symphony orchestra, and six works for wind ensemble, sixteen of these published during her lifetime. The manuscript archive is held by Cid-femmes (Women's Information Center) in Luxembourg. The center organized a three-year celebration, from 2009 to 2011, of Buchholtz's work that included concerts, recordings, and music editions.

Helen Buchholtz was born to the Esch-based Buchholtz-Ettinger family. Her father was the owner of a hardware store and the founder of the Buchholtz brewery. She started learning music from a very early age. After finishing primary school, she attended a girls' boarding school in Longwy.

On 2 April 1914, she married the German doctor Bernhard Geiger, and the couple moved to Wiesbaden. After her husband died in 1921, she returned to Luxembourg and lived in Luxembourg City in the Boulevard Paul Eyschen. Her composing skills mainly were self-taught. However, she did cooperate with various musicians and writers over the years, such as Batty Weber and Willy Goergen. She corresponded with Gustave Kahnt. She would send him her compositions, which he would read through and return to her with his suggestions. Gustave Kahnt died in 1923. After this, she worked with Jean-Pierre Beicht, who died, however, in 1925, after which she worked with Fernand Mertens, the conductor of the military band and a teacher at the Luxembourg Conservatoire.

She died shortly after her 76th birthday in 1953.

In 2022, a portal was dedicated to Helen Buchholtz on the MuGi.lu website, which, in addition to a biography, also presents selected materials on the composer's life and work, such as music, scores, written documents, press articles, photos, personal items, correspondence, radio broadcasts, and much more.
