= Albert Calmes =

Albert Calmes, born 26 February 1881 in Paris and died 22 September 1967 in Luxembourg city, was a Luxembourgish economist and historian.

He was one of the first people to return to Luxembourg with a doctorate in economics. Previously he had taught at universities in Germany and Switzerland. He became a director of ARBED and received the title Ministre plénipotentiaire honoraire.

While teaching at Frankfurt University he was commissioned by the League of Nations to investigate the financial situation in the recently founded Principality of Albania. His report was published in 1922.

As a historian, he dealt primarily with the history of Luxembourg in the 19th century.

He was the father of Christian Calmes.

== Works ==
- Histoire contemporaine du Grand-Duché de Luxembourg in 5 volumes:
  - Vol. I - Naissance et débuts du Grand-Duché (1814-1830); Luxembourg, Saint-Paul, 1971 (new version of a previous work that was published in 1932 in Brussels; edited by Christian Calmes); 569 pages
  - Vol. II - Le Grand-Duché de Luxembourg dans la Révolution belge (1830-1839); Luxembourg, Saint-Paul, 1982 (new edition; 1st edition: Brussels, 1939); 423 pages
  - Vol. III - La restauration de Guillaume Ier, roi des Pays-Bas - L'ère Hassenpflug (1839-1840); Brussels (L'Édition universelle) and Luxembourg (Saint-Paul), 1947; 424 pages
  - Vol. IV - La création d'un État (1841-1847); Luxembourg, Saint-Paul, 1983 (new edition; 1st edition 1954); 473 pages
  - Vol. V - La Révolution de 1848 au Luxembourg; Luxembourg, Saint-Paul, 1982 (new edition; 1st edition 1957); 301 pages

Christian Calmes later continued this series with four volumes (Vol. 7, Vol. 8, Vol. 10 and Vol. 11). He also wrote a Vol. 12 (1815-1989). Volumes 6 and 9 were never written.

- Au fil de l'histoire (3 volumes by Albert Calmes; series was continued by Christian Calmes) :
  - Vol. I - Luxembourg, Saint-Paul, 1968 (new edition 1979); 286 pages
  - Vol. II - Luxembourg, Saint-Paul, 1988 (3rd edition); 305 pages
  - Vol. III (with Christian Calmes)- Luxembourg, Saint-Paul, 1972 (2nd edition); 273 pages
- Das Geldsystem des Grossherzogtums Luxemburg; Leipzig, 1907.
- La comptabilité industrielle, Payot, Paris, 1922.
- Der Zollanschluss des Grossherzogtums Luxemburg an Deutschland; 2 volumes, Luxembourg, Joseph Beffort, 1919 :
  - Vol. I - Der Eintritt Luxemburgs in den Deutschen Zollverein (1839 -1842);
  - Vol. II - Die Fortdauer des Anschlusses und seine Lösung (1842-1918).

== Legacy ==
Rue Albert Calmes in Luxembourg city is named after him.

== Honours ==
- Grand Cross of the Order of Leopold II (1950)
- Grand Officer of the Order of the Oak Crown (1960)
