= Georges Christen =

Luxembourgish strongman (born 1962)

- Born: 21 December 1962 (age 62); Luxembourg City, Luxembourg
- Occupation: Strongman
- Known for: Holding 23 Guinness World Records
- Website: www.georges-christen.com

Georges Christen (born 21 December 1962 in Luxembourg City) is a Luxembourgish strongman. He holds 23 Guinness World Records, including the fastest hot water bottle inflated by lung power. Other records involve tearing up phonebooks, train-towing and plane-pulling.

== Early life and first records ==
Christen first entered the public eye when, in December 1982 when he was 19 years old, he bent 250 carpenter's nails (each about 20 cm × 7 mm) within 72 minutes and 55 seconds, surpassing the previous record of 50 nails.

He began performing public strength stunts, such as tearing phone books, bending nails, pulling vehicles by teeth, and rolling up frying pans.

== Career, records, and feats ==
As of 2022, Christen was credited with 26 strength records. Among his Guinness World Records is the fastest 10 m carrying a table (with weight) in the mouth, completed in 6.57 seconds on 18 June 2009 in Beijing.

In November 2022, during former Microsoft CEO Bill Gates’ visit to Luxembourg, Christen was reported to have lifted Gates using his teeth, in addition to other classic feats such as tearing a phonebook and bending a frying pan.

== Style, performances & public image ==
Christen is known for performing about 100 strength shows annually, often in public events, or strength exhibitions. His acts often include strongmen showmanship like bending metal nails, tearing phonebooks, pulling heavy machinery, and using his teeth to exert strength.
