= Jules Mersch =

Luxembourgish publisher and writer

Jules Mersch (29 March 1898 – 1 May 1973) was a Luxembourgish publisher and writer, born in Luxembourg City. He was the general director of Victor Buck publishing house, in which capacity he edited the National Biography of Luxembourg (French: Biographie National du pays de Luxembourg). This work involved him writing, in large parts, articles about the main political families of the early years of the Grand Duchy, including the Metz and Brasseur families. One of his best known biographers is of the Infanta Isabella, sovereign of the Spanish Netherlands.
