= Henry Cravatte =

Luxembourgish politician

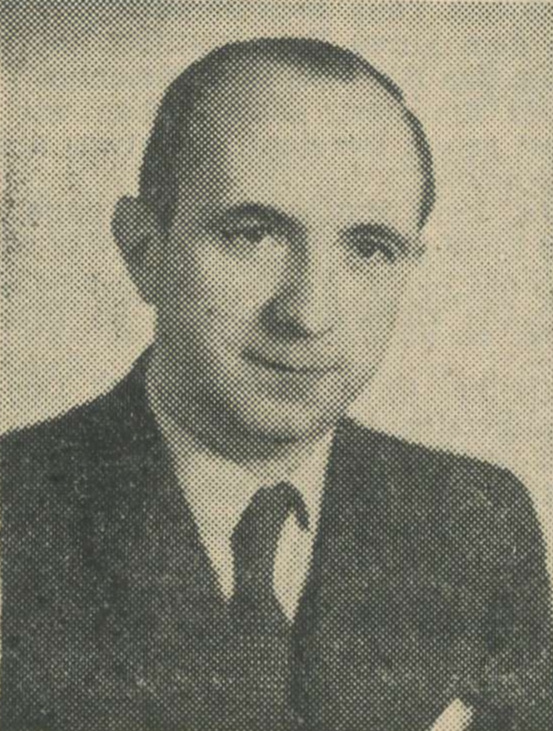
- Cravatte c. 1955

Personal details
- Born: 21 May 1911 Diekirch
- Died: 4 November 1990 (aged 79) Ettelbruck
- Party: LSAP, PSD
- Occupation: politician, jurist

Henry Cravatte (21 May 1911 – 4 November 1990) was a Luxembourgish politician.

== Political activity ==
Cravatte studied Jurisprudence and in 1936 became lawyer in Diekirch. His political career began in 1951 when he was placed on the list of the Workers' Party. He was elected to the local council and later as the mayor of Diekirch. From 1953 to 1957 he was a member of the Comité -director. In the period from 1958 to 1959 he was State Secretary of the economy. In 1959, Cravatte was elected to the Chamber of Deputies, the Luxembourg parliament. In 1964 he became Vice President of Government and Minister of Internal Affairs. After the founding of the Social Democratic Party, he resigned as president on 3 May 1970 and joined the newly formed party. From 1968 Cravatte was elected to the Chamber every five years until 1978.

Cravatte was Deputy Prime Minister from 1964 until 1969, and also served as President of the Luxembourg Socialist Workers' Party.

He was President of the Standing Conference of Local and Regional Authorities of Europe from 1962 to 1964 and again from 1976 to 1978.

On 14 March 1971 he became president of the Labor Party. He retained this post until 1980. On 4 November 1990 Henry Cravatte died at the age of 79 years in Ettelbrück.

== Awards ==
- 1962 - Decoration of Honour for Services to the Republic of Austria

Political offices
Preceded by Eugène Schaus	Deputy Prime Minister; 1964–1969	Succeeded by Eugène Schaus
Party political offices
Preceded by Paul Wilwertz	President of the LSAP; 1959–1970	Succeeded by Antoine Wehenkel
