= Paul Wilwertz =

Luxembourgish politician (1905–1979)

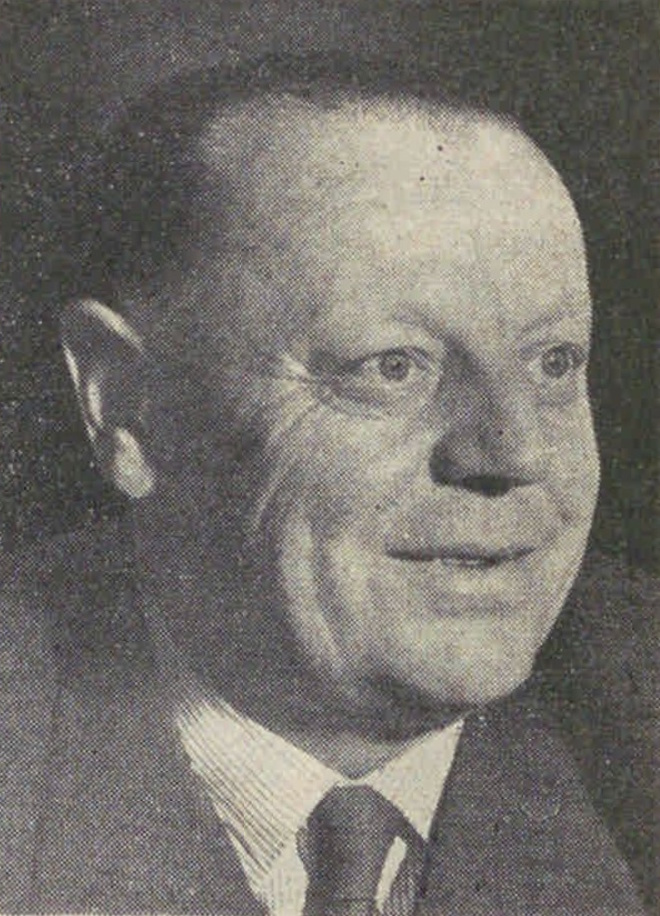
- Born: Paul Philipp Joseph Wilwertz; 7 April 1905
- Died: 28 December 1979; Ettelbruck
- Occupation: Politician
- Awards: Commander of the Legion of Honour (1977)

Paul Philippe Joseph Wilwertz (7 April 1905 – 28 December 1979) was a Luxembourgish politician for the Luxembourg Socialist Workers' Party (LSAP). He was Mayor of Luxembourg City for five years, as well as sitting in the Chamber of Deputies and holding positions in the government.

Born in Wiltz, Wilwertz attended the Athénée de Luxembourg in Luxembourg City, before studying law at Nancy, Montpellier, and Toulouse. He joined the LSAP when he was 21. He became the Director of the National Employment Office (ONT) in 1945. Later the same year, he was appointed to the Council of State and sat on the board of directors of the LSAP for the first time.

In 1945, he was also elected to Luxembourg communal council. The following year, he served as an échevin, and was the LSAP's candidate for mayor, for which he was unsuccessful. He was elected to the Chamber of Deputies at the 1951 election, representing the Centre constituency. He resigned his position at the ONT, and became President of the LSAP, holding the position for one year.

Wilwertz resigned from the Council of State on 29 June 1954, after the 1954 election, so that he could join the government as Commissioner-General for Economic Affairs. He resumed the position as LSAP party president in 1955. On 31 December 1957, his title was amended to make him Luxembourg's first ever Secretary of State. On 11 February 1958, he was promoted once again: replacing Michel Rasquin as Minister for Economic Affairs.

After the 1959 election, the LSAP was replaced as the Christian Social People's Party's (CSV) coalition partner by the Democratic Party. Wilwertz was reappointed to the Council of State on 30 December 1959, and he remained until 16 December 1968, when he was re-elected to the Chamber of Deputies. He was elected Mayor of Luxembourg City in 1963, backed by a LSAP-CSV coalition, and held the office from 1964 until 1969.

In addition to his political career, Wilwertz was heavily involved in sport administration. He was President of the Luxembourgian Cycling Federation before the Nazi occupation, and again from 1945 until 1967, during which time he was also a Vice President of the Union Cycliste Internationale. Between 1950 and 1970, Wilwertz served as the President of the Luxembourgian Olympic and Sporting Committee (COSL).

== Footnotes ==
Political offices
Preceded by Émile Hamilius	Mayor of Luxembourg City; 1964 – 1969	Succeeded by Colette Flesch
Party political offices
Preceded by Michel Rasquin	President of the LSAP (first time); 1951 – 1952	Succeeded by Albert Bousser
Preceded by Émile Ludwig	President of the LSAP (second time); 1955 – 1959	Succeeded by Henry Cravatte
Sporting positions
Preceded by Gustave Jacquemart	President of the COSL; 1950 – 1970	Succeeded by Prosper Link
