= Émile Hamilius =

Luxembourgish politician and footballer (1897–1971)

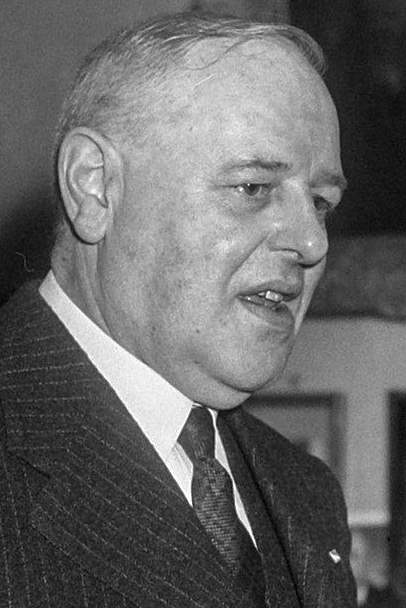
- Full name: Émile Hamilius
- Born: May 16, 1897; Luxembourg
- Died: March 7, 1971 (aged 73)
- Other occupation: Politician

Domestic
Years	League	Role
1950–1961	Luxembourg Football Federation	President

Émile Hamilius (16 May 1897 – 7 March 1971) was a Luxembourgish politician of the Democratic Party. He was the Mayor of Luxembourg City from 1946 until 1963, and also sat three stints in the Chamber of Deputies (1937–40, 1945–58, 1959–64). Hamilius was the second President of the Council of European Municipalities and Regions, from 1953 until 1959.

In earlier life, Hamilius played football for the Luxembourg national team, including at the 1920 Summer Olympics in Antwerp. He then combined his roles as an ex-footballer with that as a politician by serving as President of the Luxembourg Football Federation between 1950 and 1961.

Place Émile-Hamilius, situated just off Boulevard Royal in the Luxembourg City district of Ville Haute, is named after Hamilius. He also gave his name to the now-defunct Centre Émile Hamilius, which was the location of much of Luxembourg City's municipal administration until 2012.

His son, Jean, is a former DP politician himself, serving as a Deputy, minister, and Member of the European Parliament. He also competed at the Summer Olympics (in 1952), like Émile Hamilius.

Political offices
Preceded by Gaston Diderich	Mayor of Luxembourg City; 1946–1963	Succeeded by Paul Wilwertz
Other offices
Preceded by Fernand Cottier	President of the CEMR; 1953–1959	Succeeded by Henry Cravatte
