= Felix Welter =

Luxembourgish jurist

Felix Albert Welter (25 April 1898–1991) was a Luxembourgish jurist who served as president of the Council of State of Luxembourg from 1952 to 1969 and was a member of the European Commission of Human Rights from 1963 to 1975.

He married Marguerite Welter, who in 1923 was the first woman in Luxembourg to become a lawyer.
