= Council of State (Luxembourg) =

Advisory body to the legislature

- Conseil d'État; Staatsrot; Staatsrat
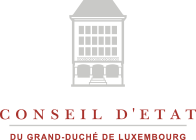

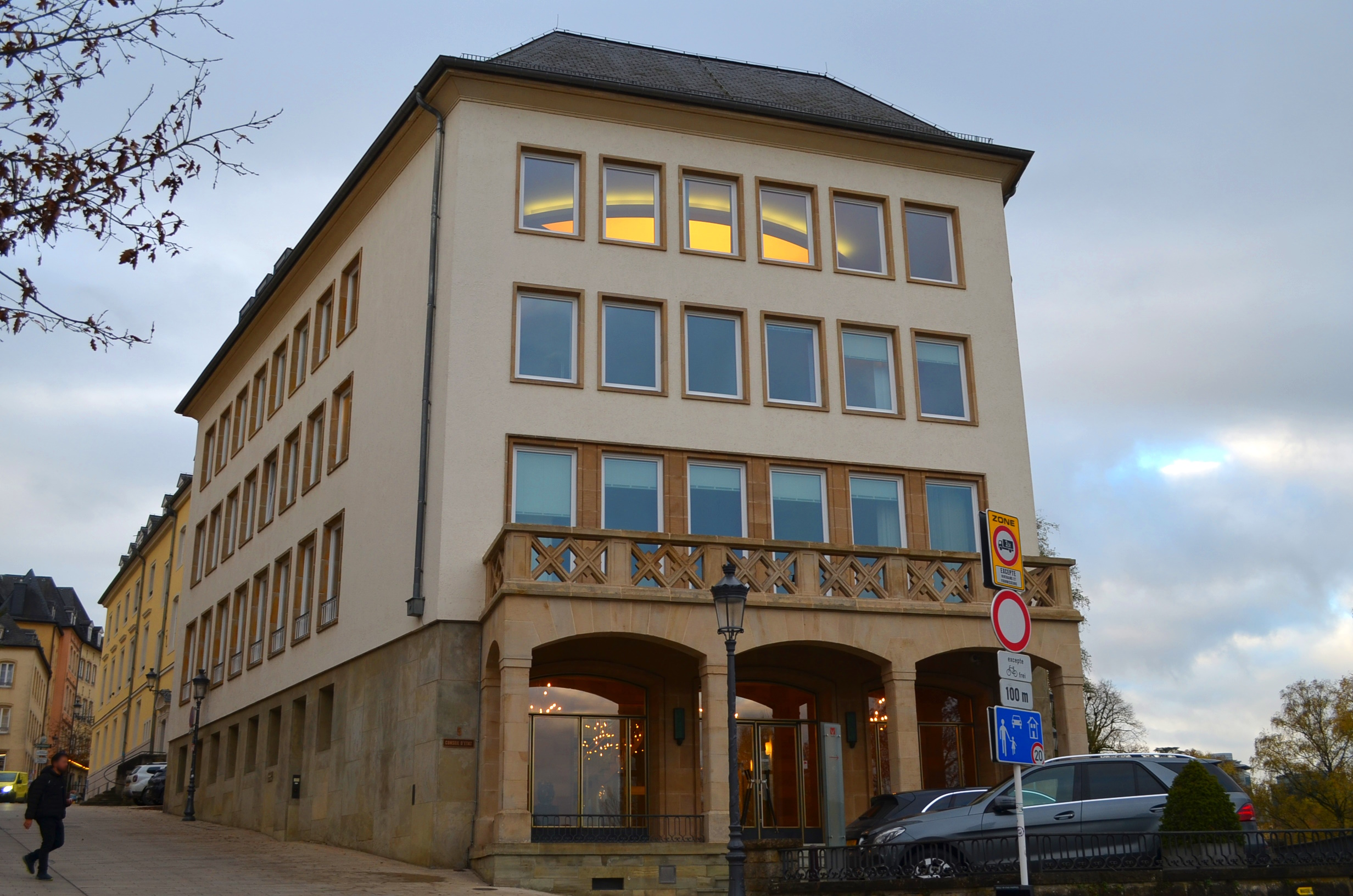
- Formation: 27 November 1856
- Founder: William III of the Netherlands
- Legal status: Advisory body
- Coordinates: 49°36′41.48″N 06°08′5.791″E
- Members: 21 Councillors
- President: Marc Thewes
- Vice-President: Alex Bodry; Alain Kinsch
- Website: conseil-etat.public.lu

The Council of State (French: Conseil d'État [kɔ̃sɛj deta]) is an institution in Luxembourg that advises the national legislature, the Chamber of Deputies as well as the Government. Until 1 January 1997, it was also the country's supreme administrative court, but this function was ceded to the newly created Administrative Tribunal and Administrative Court.

The Council of State was created by King-Grand Duke William III in the Coup of 1856. It was originally entirely appointed by the Grand Duke, but this was changed in 1866, and, despite the roll-back of many changes brought about by the coup, the Council of State has otherwise remained.

== Composition ==
The Council of State is composed of twenty-one councillors, who are formally appointed by the Grand Duke upon nomination, in order, by the government, the Chamber of Deputies, and the Council of State itself. Of these, at least eleven must hold degrees in law. Neither number applies to the Hereditary Grand Duke, who may be appointed as an additional member of the Council. Membership is restricted to Luxembourgish nationals, who are resident in the Grand Duchy, are in possession of their full civil and political rights, and are at least 30 years old. The final restriction does not apply to the heir to the throne, who may be appointed upon being granted the title of Hereditary Grand Duke after turning 18 years old.

Furthermore, the composition of the Council must, as best as possible, reflect the composition of the Chamber of Deputies, with candidates being proposed by parties that have obtained at least 3 seats in the two previous general elections. Since a 2016 reform, a relative gender balance must also be assured, with at least 7 councillors having to be women. This threshold was first reached in 2018, with the appointment of Véronique Stoffel, who was proposed by the ADR.

== Current councillors ==
As of 9 June 2026, the members of the Council of State are:

Position	Name	Nominated by	Proposed by	Councillor since
President	Marc Thewes	Government	CSV	4 February 2015
Vice Presidents	Alex Bodry	Council	LSAP	20 January 2020
Vice Presidents	Alain Kinsch	Council	DP	4 February 2015
Councillors	Monique Adams	Council	LSAP	28 January 2022
Councillors	Héloïse Bock	Chamber	DP	25 July 2015
Councillors	Marc Colas	Council	CSV	27 November 2015
Councillors	Deidre Du Bois	Chamber	Greens	30 November 2019
Councillors	Luc Feller	Council	CSV	13 March 2024
Councillors	Lynn Frank	Government	CSV	15 May 2025
Councillors	Maximilien Lehnen	Council	DP	29 September 2026
Councillors	Paulette Lenert	Chamber	LSAP	9 June 2026
Councillors	Lucien Lux	Government	LSAP	24 December 2013
Councillors	Marc Meyers	Government	DP	24 March 2021
Councillors	Jeannot Nies	Chamber	CSV	11 May 2015
Councillors	Josiane Pauly	Chamber	Greens	20 October 2021
Councillors	Alex Penning	Government	ADR	21 March 2024
Councillors	Isabelle Schlesser	Government	Independent	1 July 2016
Councillors	Thierry Schuman	Chamber	CSV	24 July 2024
Councillors	Véronique Stoffel	Chamber	ADR	5 March 2018
Councillors	Dan Theisen	Government	DP	10 June 2015
Councillors	Paul Wirtgen	Government	CSV	14 March 2022
