= List of presidents of the Council of State of Luxembourg =

The president of the Council of State is the leader of Luxembourg's Council of State.

The president is appointed by the grand duke, along with two vice presidents, and the appointment lasts for one year (although it can be renewed). The president of the Council of State must be either a member of the Council of State or the grand duke himself. However, to date, the latter option has never been taken, and it has become convention that the grand duke cannot be the president.

Note that the position has often been left vacant, so few of the successions were immediate.

== List of presidents ==
List of presidents since 1857
President	Start date	End date
Gaspard-Théodore-Ignace de la Fontaine	28 Nov 1857	10 Apr 1868
Charles-Mathias Simons	5 Jan 1869	5 Jan 1870
François-Xavier Wurth-Paquet	16 Feb 1870	16 Feb 1871
Vendelin Jurion	15 Mar 1871	15 Mar 1872
Édouard Thilges (1st time)	25 Jul 1872	29 Jul 1874
Emmanuel Servais	27 Dec 1874	8 Nov 1887
Henri Vannérus (1st time)	15 Feb 1888	15 Feb 1889
Édouard Thilges (2nd time)	15 Feb 1889	23 May 1895
Henri Vannérus (2nd time)	23 May 1895	28 Dec 1914
Victor Thorn (1st time)	28 Dec 1914	3 Mar 1915
Victor Thorn (2nd time)	6 Nov 1915	24 Feb 1916
Mathias Mongenast	1 Apr 1916	19 Jun 1917
Victor Thorn (3rd time)	19 Jun 1917	15 Sep 1930
Joseph Steichen	27 Feb 1931	20 Feb 1932
Ernest Hamélius	10 Jun 1932	16 Nov 1945
Léon Kauffmann	14 Dec 1945	14 Feb 1952
Félix Welter	14 Feb 1952	30 Jun 1969
Maurice Sevenig	1 Jul 1969	26 Jun 1975
Emile Raus	26 Jun 1975	25 Jun 1976
Albert Goldmann	26 Jun 1976	4 Dec 1976
Ferdinand Wirtgen	20 Dec 1976	30 Sep 1978
Roger Maul	1 Oct 1978	16 Sep 1979
Alex Bonn	21 Sep 1979	18 Jun 1980
François Goerens	20 Jun 1980	2 Aug 1987
Ernest Arendt	6 Aug 1987	6 Aug 1988
Georges Thorn	6 Aug 1988	30 Oct 1991
Jean Dupong	1 Nov 1991	18 May 1994
Paul Beghin	19 May 1994	31 Dec 1999
Raymond Kirsch	14 Jan 2000	13 Jan 2001
Marcel Sauber	15 Jan 2001	11 Mar 2003
Pierre Mores	29 Apr 2003	30 Sep 2007
Alain Meyer	1 Oct 2007	14 Nov 2009
Georges Schroeder	17 Nov 2009	7 Jun 2012
Victor Gillen	7 Aug 2012	20 Dec 2014
Viviane Ecker	23 Dec 2014	28 Mar 2016
Georges Wivenes	30 Mar 2016	31 Mar 2019
Agnès Durdu	1 Apr 2019	6 Apr 2021
Christophe Schiltz	7 Apr 2021	6 Apr 2024
Marc Thewes	7 Apr 2024	Present day

== See also ==
- List of members of the Council of State of Luxembourg
- List of presidents of the Chamber of Deputies of Luxembourg
