= List of presidents of the Chamber of Deputies of Luxembourg =

Presiding officer of the Chamber of Deputies of Luxembourg

President of the Chamber of Deputies of Luxembourg

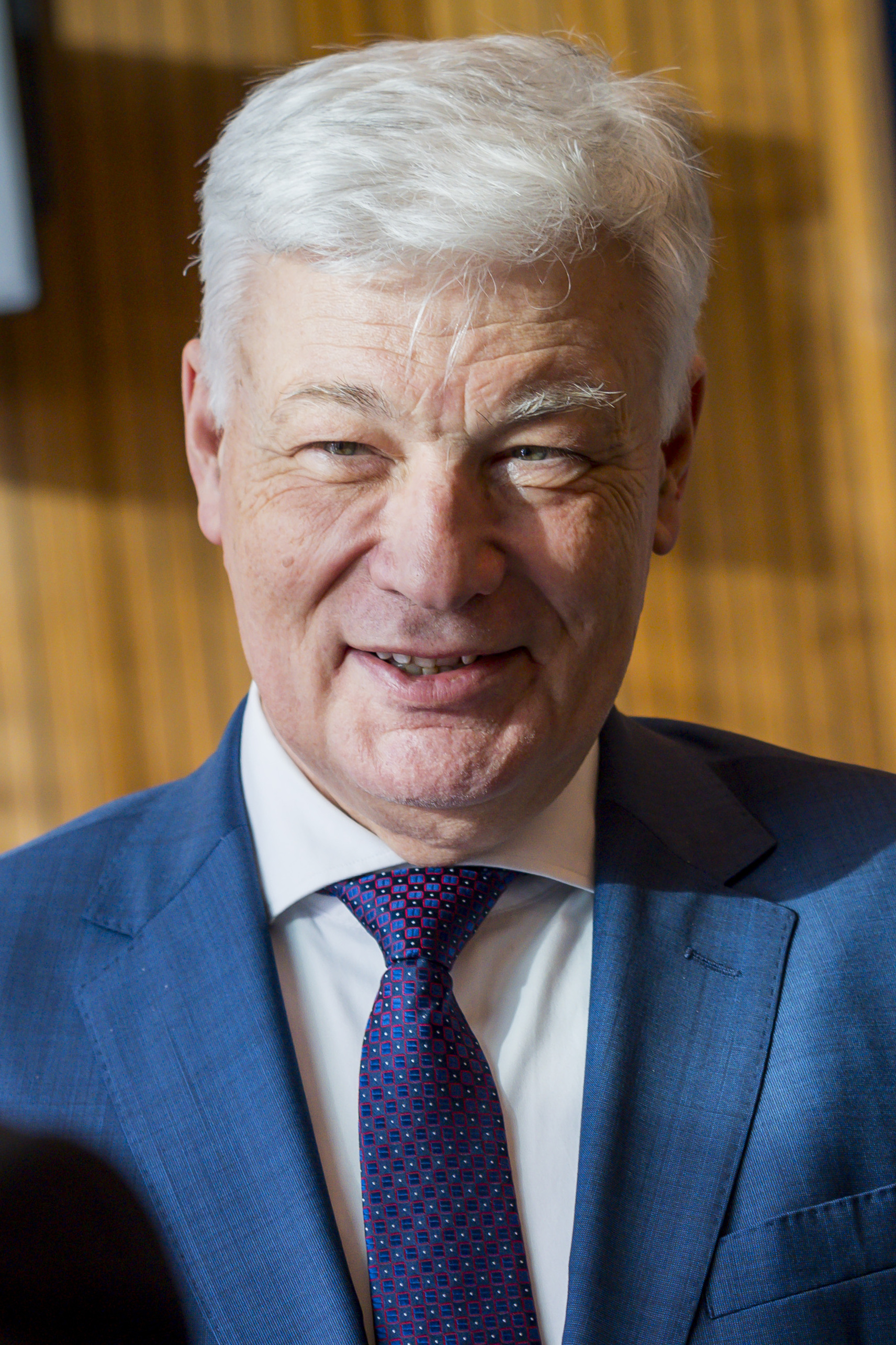
- Incumbent; Claude Wiseler since 21 November 2023
- Chamber of Deputies
- Style: Mr. President (informal – male); The Honorable (formal)
- Status: Presiding officer
- Seat: Hôtel de la Chambre, Luxembourg City
- Nominator: Party conferences (primarily)
- Appointer: Chamber of Deputies
- Term length: At the Chamber's pleasure; elected at the beginning of the new legislative period by a majority of the deputies, and upon a vacancy during a legislative period.
- Constituting instrument: Constitution of the Grand Duchy of Luxembourg
- Formation: 1848; 178 years ago
- First holder: Charles Metz
- Website: www.chambre.lu

The president of the Chamber of Deputies (Luxembourgish: Chamberpresident, French: Président de la Chambre des Députés) is the presiding officer in Luxembourg's unicameral national legislature, the Chamber of Deputies. The current president is Claude Wiseler who is the 40th person to hold the position.

The person holding the office is sometimes referred to as the "First Citizen of the Country" (Luxembourgish: éischte Bierger vum Land).

Note that, during recess, the chamber does not have a president. However, for continuity purposes, unless the president changes between one parliamentary session and another, the presidency is treated as though it is held continuously.

Name	Party	Legislature	Start date	End date
Charles Metz		2nd	1848	1853
Théodore Pescatore (first time)		2nd	1853	1855
Théodore Pescatore (first time)		3rd	1853	1855
Baron de Tornaco (first time)		3rd	1855	1856
Jean-Mathias Wellenstein		4th	1857	1858
Jean-Pierre Toutsch (first time)		4th	1858	1859
Baron de Tornaco (second time)		4th	1859	1860
Norbert Metz		4th	1860	1861
Théodore Pescatore (second time)		4th	1861	1866
Théodore Pescatore (second time)		5th	1861	1866
Michel Witry		5th	1866	1867
Jean-Pierre Toutsch (second time)		5th	1867	1869
Paul de Scherff		5th	1869	1872
Paul de Scherff		6th	1869	1872
Félix de Blochausen		6th	1872	1875
Jacques Gustave Lessel		7th	1875	1886
Jacques Gustave Lessel		8th	1875	1886
Zénon de Muyser		8th	1886	1887
Emmanuel Servais		9th	1887	1890
Théodore Willibrord de Wacquant		9th	1890	1896
Théodore Willibrord de Wacquant		10th	1890	1896
Charles-Jean Simons		10th	10 November 1896	7 November 1905
Charles-Jean Simons		11th	10 November 1896	7 November 1905
Auguste Laval	LL	12th	7 November 1905	1915
Auguste Laval	LL	13th	7 November 1905	1915
Edouard Hemmer		13th	1915	1917
Edouard Hemmer		14th	1915	1917
François Altwies	PD	14th	1917	1925
François Altwies	PD	15th	1917	1925
René Blum	PS	16th	1925	1926
Émile Reuter (first time)	PD	16th	1926	20 October 1944
Émile Reuter (first time)	PD	17th	1926	20 October 1944
Émile Reuter (first time)	PD	18th	1926	20 October 1944
Nicolas Wirtgen	CSV	-	6 December 1944	1945
Émile Reuter (second time)	CSV	19th	1945	1958
Émile Reuter (second time)	CSV	20th	1945	1958
Émile Reuter (second time)	CSV	21st	1945	1958
Joseph Bech	CSV	22nd	5 March 1959	6 May 1964
Victor Bodson	LSAP	23rd	21 July 1964	5 July 1967
Romain Fandel	LSAP	23rd	6 July 1967	31 October 1968
Pierre Grégoire	CSV	24th	5 February 1969	15 May 1974
Antoine Wehenkel	LSAP	25th	27 June 1974	22 July 1975
René Van Den Bulcke	LSAP	25th	14 October 1975	23 May 1979
Léon Bollendorff	CSV	26th	24 July 1979	31 May 1989
Léon Bollendorff	CSV	27th	24 July 1979	31 May 1989
Erna Hennicot-Schoepges	CSV	28th	18 July 1989	26 January 1995
Erna Hennicot-Schoepges	CSV	29th	18 July 1989	26 January 1995
Jean Spautz	CSV	29th	31 January 1995	21 May 2004
Jean Spautz	CSV	30th	31 January 1995	21 May 2004
Lucien Weiler	CSV	31st	30 July 2004	7 June 2009
Laurent Mosar	CSV	32nd	28 July 2009	12 November 2013
Mars Di Bartolomeo	LSAP	33rd	5 December 2013	30 October 2018
Fernand Etgen	DP	34th	6 December 2018	24 October 2023
Claude Wiseler	CSV	35th	21 November 2023	Incumbent

In addition, there were four extraordinary sessions, for which the Presidents were selected by virtue of being the oldest members. In these cases, the Presidents were:

- 11 January 1858: Mathias Ulrich
- 24 June 1872 – 27 June 1872 Michel Witry
- 6 July 1979: Jean-Pierre Urwald
- 16 July 1984: Jean-Pierre Urwald

== See also ==
- List of presidents of the Council of State of Luxembourg
