= History of Luxembourg =

The history of Luxembourg consists of the history of the country of Luxembourg and its geographical area.

Although its recorded history can be traced back to Roman times, the history of Luxembourg proper is considered to begin in 963. Over the following five centuries, the powerful House of Luxembourg emerged, but its extinction put an end to the country's independence. After a brief period of Burgundian rule, the country passed to the Habsburgs in 1477.

After the Eighty Years' War, Luxembourg became a part of the Southern Netherlands, which passed to the Austrian line of the Habsburg dynasty in 1713. After occupation by Revolutionary France, the 1815 Vienna Congress transformed Luxembourg into a Grand Duchy in personal union with the Netherlands. The treaty also resulted in the second partitioning of Luxembourg, the first being in 1658 and a third in 1839. Although these treaties greatly reduced Luxembourg's territory, the latter established its formal independence, which was confirmed after the Luxembourg Crisis of 1867.

In the following decades, Luxembourg fell further into Germany's sphere of influence, particularly after the creation of a separate ruling house in 1890. It was occupied by Germany from 1914 until 1918 and again from 1940 until 1944. Since the end of the Second World War, Luxembourg has become one of the world's richest countries, buoyed by political stability and European integration.

== Early history ==
History of the Low Countries (schematic)
Frisii		Germanic tribes		Belgae & Celts			
Frisii	Cana– nefates (Note: Roman foederati)	Chamavi, Tubantes (Note: The Chamavi merged into the confederation of the Franks; the Tubantes merged into the confederation of the Saxons.)		Gallia Belgica (55 BC–c. 5th century AD); Germania Inferior (83–c. 5th century)			
Frisii	Cana– nefates	Salian Franks		Batavi			
unpopulated (4th –c. 5th centuries)		Saxons	Salian Franks (4th–c. 5th centuries)				
Frisian Kingdom (c. 6th century – 734)		Saxons	Frankish Kingdom (481–843)—Carolingian Empire (800–843)				
Frisian Kingdom (c. 6th century – 734)		Austrasia (511–687)					
Middle Francia (843–855)				West; Francia (from 843)	Middle Francia (843–855)		
Kingdom of Lotharingia (Note: Part of East Francia after 939, divided in Upper Lorraine (as part of West Francia) and Lower Lorraine (as part of East Francia) in 959.) (855–959); Duchy of Lower Lorraine (Note: Lower Lorraine—also referred to as Lothier—disintegrated into several smaller independent territories and only the title of a "Duke of Lothier" remained, held by Brabant.) (from 959)			Kingdom of Lotharingia (855–959); Duchy of Lower Lorraine (from 959)	West; Francia (from 843)	Kingdom of Lotharingia (855–959); Duchy of Lower Lorraine (from 959)		
Frisia			Kingdom of Lotharingia (855–959); Duchy of Lower Lorraine (from 959)	County of Flanders (Note: Including County of Artois (part of Flanders until 1237) and Tournaisis.) (862–1384)	Kingdom of Lotharingia (855–959); Duchy of Lower Lorraine (from 959)		
Frisian; Freedom (Note: Lordship of Frisia and Lordship of Groningen (including the Ommelanden) after 1524 and 1536 respectively.) (11th–16th centuries)	County of Holland (Note: Including County of Zeeland, that was ruled by neighboring County of Holland and County of Flanders (until 1432).) (880–1432)	Bishopric of Utrecht (Note: Utrecht included Lordship of Overijssel (until 1528), County of Drenthe (until 1528) and County of Zutphen (until 1182).) (695–1456)	Duchy of Brabant (Note: Duchy of Brabant included since 1288 also the Duchy of Limburg (now part of Belgium's Liège Province) and the "Overmaas" lands Dalhem, Valkenburg and Herzogenrath (now part of the Dutch Province of Limburg).) (1183–1430) Duchy of Guelders (Note: The county, later duchy, of Guelders consisted of four quarters, as they were separated by rivers: situated upstream Upper Quarter (the present day northern half of the Dutch province of Limburg), spatially separated from the three downstream Lower Quarters: County of Zutphen (after 1182), Veluwe Quarter and Nijmegen Quarter. The three lower quarters emerged from the historic gau Hamaland (named after the Chamavi tribe), and formed the present day province of Gelderland. Guelders did not include the Cleves enclave Huissen and the independent counties of Buren and Culemborg, that were much later seceded to the province of Gelderland.) (1046–1543)	County of Flanders (862–1384)	County of Hainaut (1071–1432) County of Namur (981–1421)	Prince- Bishopric of Liège (Note: Throughout the Middle Ages, the bishopric was further expanded with the Duchy of Bouillon in 1096 (ceded to France in 1678), the acquisition of the county of Loon in 1366 and the county of Horne in 1568. The Lordship of Mechelen was also part of the Prince-Bishopric of Liège.)(980–1791)	Duchy of Luxembourg (1059–1443)
Frisian; Freedom (11th–16th centuries)	Burgundian Netherlands (1384–1482)					Prince- Bishopric of Liège (980–1791)	Burgundian Netherlands (1384–1482)
Habsburg Netherlands (1482–1795) (Seventeen Provinces after 1543) (Note: The name Seventeen Provinces came in use after the Habsburg emperor Charles V had re-acquired the Duchy of Guelders, and an continuous territory arose.)						Prince- Bishopric of Liège (980–1791)	Habsburg Netherlands (1482–1795) (Seventeen Provinces after 1543)
Dutch Republic (1581–1795)				Spanish Netherlands (1556–1714)		Prince- Bishopric of Liège (980–1791)	Spanish Netherlands (1556–1714)
Dutch Republic (1581–1795)				Austrian Netherlands (1714–1795)		Prince- Bishopric of Liège (980–1791)	Austrian Netherlands (1714–1795)
Dutch Republic (1581–1795)				United States of Belgium (1790)		Republic of Liège (1789–'91)	United States of Belgium (1790)
Dutch Republic (1581–1795)				Austrian Netherlands (1795–1797)		P.-Bish. of Liège (1791–1794)	Austrian Netherlands (1795–1797)
Batavian Republic (1795–1806); Kingdom of Holland (1806–1810)			associated with French First Republic (1795–1804) part of First French Empire (1804–1815)				
part of First French Empire (1810–1813)			associated with French First Republic (1795–1804) part of First French Empire (1804–1815)				
Sovereign Principality of the Netherlands (1813–1815)			associated with French First Republic (1795–1804) part of First French Empire (1804–1815)				
United Kingdom of the Netherlands (1815–1830)							Grand Duchy of Luxembourg (from 1815)
Kingdom of the Netherlands (from 1839)				Kingdom of Belgium (from 1830)			Grand Duchy of Luxembourg (from 1815)
Kingdom of the Netherlands (from 1839)				Kingdom of Belgium (from 1830)			Grand Duchy of Luxembourg (from 1890)

In the territory now covered by the Grand Duchy of Luxembourg, there is evidence of primitive inhabitants dating back to the Paleolithic or Old Stone Age over 35,000 years ago. The oldest artifacts from this period are decorated bones found at Oetrange.

However, the first real evidence of civilisation is from the Neolithic or 5th millennium BC, from which evidence of houses has been found. Traces have been found in the south of Luxembourg at Grevenmacher, Diekirch, Aspelt and Weiler-la-Tour. The dwellings were made of a combination of tree trunks for the basic structure, mud-clad wickerwork walls, and roofs of thatched reeds or straw. Pottery from this period has been found near Remerschen.

While there is not much evidence of communities in Luxembourg at the beginning of the Bronze Age, a number of sites dating back to the period between the 13th and the 8th century BC provide evidence of dwellings and reveal artefacts such as pottery, knives and jewellery. The sites include Nospelt, Dalheim, Mompach and Remerschen.

What is present-day Luxembourg, was inhabited by Celts during the Iron Age (from roughly 600 BC until 100 AD). The Gaulish tribe in what is present-day Luxembourg during and after the La Tène period was known as the Treveri; they reached the height of prosperity in the 1st century BC. The Treveri constructed a number of oppida, Iron Age fortified settlements, near the Moselle valley in what is now southern Luxembourg, western Germany and eastern France. Most of the archaeological evidence from this period has been discovered in tombs, many closely associated with Titelberg, a 50 ha site which reveals much about the dwellings and handicrafts of the period.

The Romans, under Julius Caesar, completed their conquest and occupation in 53 BC. The first known reference to the territory of present-day Luxembourg was by Julius Caesar in his Commentaries on the Gallic War. The Treveri were more co-operative with the Romans than most Gallic tribes, and adapted readily to Roman civilization. Two revolts in the 1st century AD did not permanently damage their cordial relations with Rome. The land of the Treveri was at first part of Gallia Celtica, but with the reform of Domitian in c. 90, was reassigned to Gallia Belgica.

Gallia Belgica was infiltrated by the Germanic Franks from the 4th century, and was abandoned by Rome in AD 406. The territory of what would become Luxembourg by the 480s, became part of Merovingia Austrasia and eventually part of the core territory of the Carolingian Empire. With the Treaty of Verdun (843), it fell to Middle Francia, and in 855, to Lotharingia. With the latter's division in 959, it then fell to the Duchy of Upper Lorraine within the Holy Roman Empire.

== County ==
The history of Luxembourg properly began with the construction of Luxembourg Castle in the High Middle Ages. It was Siegfried I, count of Ardennes who traded some of his ancestral lands with the monks of the Abbey of St. Maximin in Trier in 963 for an ancient, supposedly Roman, fort named Lucilinburhuc, commonly translated as "little castle". Modern historians link the etymology of the word with Letze, meaning fortification, which may have referred to either the remains of a Roman watchtower or to a primitive refuge of the early Middle Ages.

== Duchy ==
From the Early Middle Ages to the Renaissance, Luxembourg bore multiple names, depending on the author. These include Lucilinburhuc, Lutzburg, Lützelburg, Luccelemburc, and Lichtburg, among others. The Luxembourgish dynasty produced several Holy Roman Emperors, Kings of Bohemia, and Archbishops of Trier and Mainz.

Around the fort of Luxembourg, a town gradually developed, which became the centre of a small but important state of great strategic value to France, Germany and the Netherlands. Luxembourg's fortress, located on a rocky outcrop known as the Bock, was steadily enlarged and strengthened over the years by successive owners. Some of these included the Bourbons, Habsburgs and Hohenzollerns, who made it one of the strongest fortresses on the European continent, the Fortress of Luxembourg. Its formidable defences and strategic location caused it to become known as the ‘Gibraltar of the North’.

== Habsburg (1477–1795) and French (1795–1815) rule ==
In the 17th and 18th centuries, the electors of Brandenburg, later kings of Prussia (Borussia), advanced their claim to the Luxembourg patrimony as heirs-general to William of Thuringia and his wife Anna of Bohemia, the disputed dukes of Luxembourg in the 1460s. Anna was the eldest daughter of the last Luxembourg heiress. From 1609 onward, they had a territorial base in the vicinity, the Duchy of Cleves, the starting-point of the future Prussian Rhineland. This Brandenburger claim ultimately produced some results when some districts of Luxembourg were united with Prussia in 1813.

The first Hohenzollern claimant to descend from both Anna and her younger sister Elisabeth, was John George, Elector of Brandenburg (1525–98), his maternal grandmother having been Barbara Jagiellon. In the late 18th century, the younger line of Orange-Nassau (the princes who held sway in the neighbouring Dutch oligarchy) also became related to the Brandenburgers.

In 1598, the then possessor, Philip II of Spain, bequeathed Luxembourg and the other Low Countries to his daughter, the Infanta Isabella Clara Eugenia and her husband Albert VII, Archduke of Austria. Albert was an heir and descendant of Elisabeth of Austria (d. 1505), queen of Poland, the youngest granddaughter of Sigismund of Luxembourg, the Holy Roman Emperor. Thus, Luxembourg returned to the heirs of the old Luxembourg dynasty of the line of Elisabeth. The Low Countries were a separate political entity during the couple's reign. After Albert's childless death in 1621, Luxembourg passed to his great-nephew and heir Philip IV of Spain.

=== Governance ===
In the early 17th century, the Duchy was a Spanish possession administered from Brussels by an appointee of the Spanish King, at the same time as the other territories that formed the Spanish Netherlands. They held the title of Governor-General or Lieutenant Governor and were frequently a relative of the King.

The Governor-General was represented in Luxembourg by the Governor. They were surrounded by counsellors, who formed the Provincial Council, effectively the Duchy's government. However, as there was no separation of powers, the Provincial Council was also the main court of justice.

The Duchy was composed of administrative units that were very different in nature:

- seigneuries (lordships), belonging to the nobility
- influential abbeys, whose many lands were exploited by the abbots
- prévôtés, governed directly by the King's administration: prévôts and sous-prévôts (provosts and sub-provosts)
- towns, living according to the laws of their charter

From the 14th century, the inhabitants were represented by the Estates. This assembly comprised representatives of the three orders:

- the nobility
- the clergy
- the towns

All the heads of noble families had the right to participate in sessions of the Estates, while the clergy were represented only by the heads of the largest abbeys: St. Maximin's Abbey of Trier, Echternach Abbey, Münster Abbey, Orval Abbey, and Saint-Hubert Abbey. The secular clergy, the priests in the villages and towns, were therefore not included. A certain number of towns were represented. For the German-speaking part of the Duchy, this was Luxembourg, Echternach, Diekirch, Grevenmacher and Remich. Villages had no representation.

=== French invasion ===
Luxembourg was invaded by Louis XIV of France (husband of Maria Theresa, daughter of Philip IV) in 1684, an action that caused alarm among France's neighbors and resulted in the formation of the League of Augsburg in 1686. In the ensuing War of the Grand Alliance, France was forced to give up the duchy, which was returned to the Habsburgs by the Treaty of Ryswick in 1697.

During this period of French rule, the defences of the fortress were strengthened by the famous siege engineer Vauban. The French king's great-grandson Louis (1710–74) was, from 1712, the first heir-general of Albert VII. Albert VII was a descendant of Anna of Bohemia and William of Thuringia, having that blood through his mother's Danish great-great-grandmother, but was not the heir-general of that line. Louis was the first real claimant of Luxembourg to descend from both sisters, the daughters of Elizabeth of Luxembourg, the last Luxembourg empress.

Habsburg rule was confirmed in 1715 by the Treaty of Utrecht, and Luxembourg was integrated into the Southern Netherlands. Emperor Joseph and his successor Emperor Charles VI were descendants of Spanish kings who were heirs of Albert VII. Joseph and Charles VI were also descendants of Anna of Bohemia and William of Thuringia, having that blood through their mother, although they were heirs-general of neither line. Charles was the first ruler of Luxembourg to descend from both sisters, daughters of Elisabeth of Bohemia.

Austrian rulers were ready to exchange Luxembourg and other territories in the Low Countries. Their purpose was to round out and enlarge their power base, which in geographical terms was centred around Vienna. Thus, Bavarian candidate(s) emerged to take over the Duchy of Luxembourg, but this plan led to nothing permanent. Emperor Joseph II however, made a preliminary pact to make a neighbour of Luxembourg, Charles Theodore, Elector Palatine, as Duke of Luxembourg and king in the Low Countries, in exchange for his possessions in Bavaria and Franconia. However, this scheme was aborted by Prussia's opposition. Charles Theodore, who would have become Duke of Luxembourg, was genealogically a junior descendant of both Anna and Elisabeth, but the main heir of neither.

During the War of the First Coalition, Luxembourg was conquered and annexed by Revolutionary France, becoming part of the département of the Forêts in 1795. The annexation was formalised at Campo Formio in 1797. In 1798, Luxembourgish peasants started a rebellion against the French but it was rapidly suppressed. This brief rebellion is called the Peasant's War.

== Developing independence (1815–1890) ==
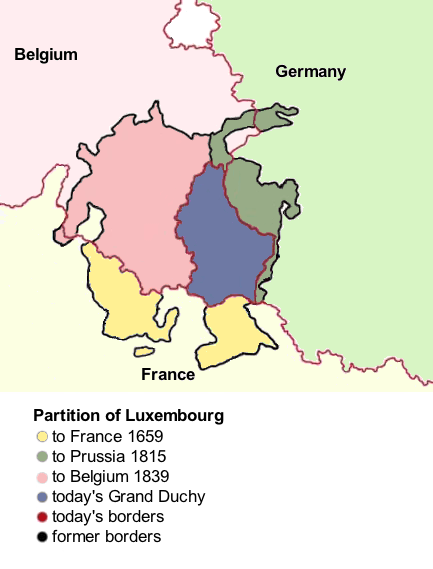
The three Partitions of Luxembourg

Luxembourg remained more or less under French rule until the defeat of Napoleon in 1815. When the French departed, the Allies installed a provisional administration. Luxembourg initially came under the Generalgouvernement Mittelrhein in mid-1814, and then from June 1814 under the Generalgouvernement Nieder- und Mittelrhein (General Government Lower and Middle Rhine).

The Congress of Vienna of 1815, gave formal autonomy to Luxembourg. In 1813, the Prussians had already managed to wrest lands from Luxembourg, to strengthen the Prussian-possessed Duchy of Julich. The Bourbons of France held a strong claim to Luxembourg, whereas the Emperor Francis of Austria, on the other hand, had controlled the duchy until the revolutionary forces had joined it to the French republic. However, his Chancellor, Klemens von Metternich, was not enthusiastic about regaining Luxembourg and the Low Countries, as they were separated so far from the main body of the Austrian Empire.

Prussia and the Netherlands, both claiming Luxembourg, made an exchange deal: Prussia received the Principality of Orange-Nassau, the ancestral Principality of the Prince of Orange in Central Germany; and the Prince of Orange in turn received Luxembourg. In 1815 Luxembourg joined the German Confederation and 1842 the German Customs Union.

Luxembourg, somewhat diminished in size (as the medieval lands had been slightly reduced by the French and Prussian heirs), was augmented in another way through the elevation to the status of grand duchy and placed under the rule of William I of the Netherlands. This was the first time that the duchy had a monarch who had no claim to the inheritance of the medieval patrimony. However, Luxembourg's military value to Prussia prevented it from becoming a full part of the Dutch kingdom. The fortress, ancestral seat of the medieval Luxembourgers, was garrisoned by Prussian forces, following Napoleon's defeat, and Luxembourg became a member of the German Confederation with Prussia responsible for its defence, and a state under the suzerainty of the Netherlands at the same time.

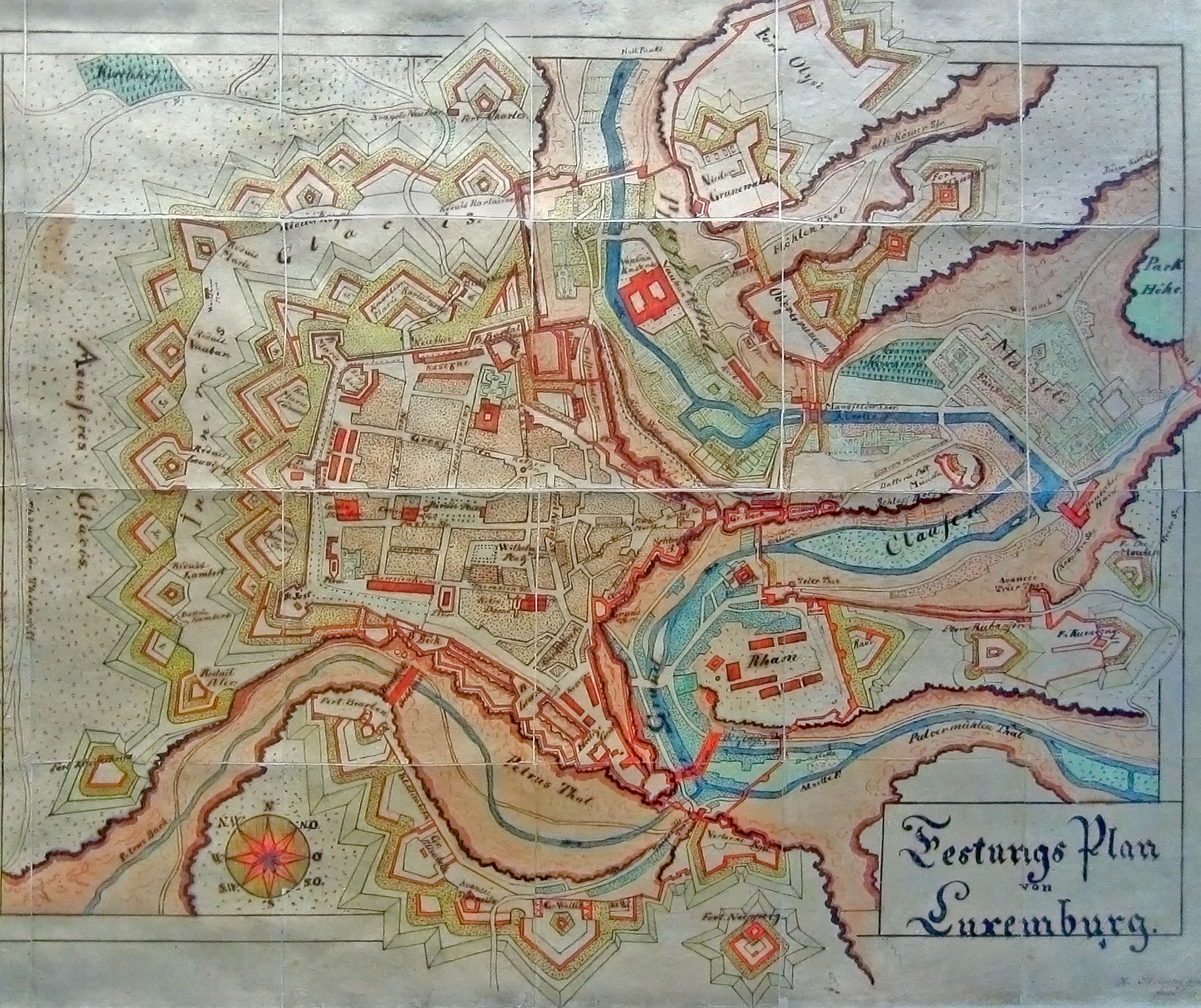
Historic map (undated) of Luxembourg city's fortifications

In July 1819, a contemporary from Britain visited Luxembourg — his journal offers some insights. Norwich Duff, writes of its city that

"Luxembourg is considered one of the strongest fortifications in Europe, and … it appears so. It is situated in Holland (then as now used by English speakers as shorthand for the Netherlands) but by treaty is garrisoned by Prussians and 5,000 of their troops occupy it under a Prince of Hesse. The civil government is under the Dutch and the duties collected by them. The town is not very large but the streets are broader than [in] the French towns and clean and the houses are good.... [I] got the cheapest of hot baths here at the principal house I ever had in my life: one franc."

In 1820, Luxembourg made use of the metric system of measurement compulsory. Previously, the country had using local units such as the "malter" (which was equivalent to 191 litres).

Much of the Luxembourgish population joined the Belgian revolution against Dutch rule. Except for the fortress and its immediate vicinity, Luxembourg was considered a province of the new Belgian state from 1830 to 1839. By the Treaty of London in 1839, the status of the grand duchy became fully sovereign and in personal union to the king of the Netherlands. In turn, the predominantly Oil-speaking geographically larger western part of the duchy was ceded to Belgium as the province de Luxembourg.

This loss left the Grand Duchy of Luxembourg a predominantly German state, although French cultural influence remained strong. The loss of Belgian markets also caused painful economic problems for the state. Recognising this, the grand duke integrated it into the German Zollverein in 1842. Nevertheless, Luxembourg remained an underdeveloped agrarian country for most of the century. As a result of this, about one in five of the inhabitants emigrated to the United States between 1841 and 1891.

Beginning in the 1830s, Luxembourg came to develop its own national identity. The Catholic Church helped provide a sense of a unique cultural identity, and as early as 1840, Luxembourg had been granted its own diocese, and in 1870, a separate bishopric. Luxemburger Wort, which came to be the dominant national newspaper in Luxembourg, also had close links with the church. Patterns of language use further consolidated Luxembourgish nationality - while bilingualism prevailed, Luxembourgish became a language used in local literature and newspapers, especially when domestic issues and folklore were discussed; French was considered a language of diplomacy and was used when discussing international matters.

=== Crisis of 1867 ===
In 1867, Luxembourg's independence was confirmed, after a turbulent period which even included a brief time of civil unrest against plans to annex Luxembourg to Belgium, Germany, or France. The crisis of 1867 almost resulted in war between France and Prussia over the status of Luxembourg, which had become free of German control when the German Confederation was abolished at the end of the Seven Weeks War in 1866.

William III, king of the Netherlands, and sovereign of Luxembourg, was willing to sell the grand duchy to France's Emperor Napoleon III in order to retain Limbourg but backed out when Prussian chancellor, Otto von Bismarck, expressed opposition. The growing tension brought about a conference in London from March to May 1867 in which the British served as mediators between the two rivals. Bismarck manipulated public opinion, resulting in the denial of sale to France. The issue was resolved by the second Treaty of London which guaranteed the perpetual independence and neutrality of the state. The fortress walls were pulled down and the Prussian garrison was withdrawn.

Famous visitors to Luxembourg in the 18th and 19th centuries included the German poet Johann Wolfgang von Goethe, the French writers Émile Zola and Victor Hugo, the Hungarian composer Franz Liszt, and the English painter Joseph Mallord William Turner.

== Separation and the World Wars (1890–1945) ==
Luxembourg remained a possession of the kings of the Netherlands until the death of William III in 1890, when the grand duchy passed to the House of Nassau-Weilburg due to the 1783 Nassau Family Pact, under which those territories of the Nassau family in the Holy Roman Empire at the time of the pact (Luxembourg and Nassau) were bound by semi-Salic law, which allowed inheritance by females or through the female line only upon extinction of male members of the dynasty. When William III died leaving only his daughter Wilhelmina as an heir, the crown of the Netherlands, not being bound by the family pact, passed to Wilhelmina. However, the crown of Luxembourg passed to a male of another branch of the House of Nassau: Adolphe, the dispossessed Duke of Nassau and head of the branch of Nassau-Weilburg.

By the beginning of the 20th century, Luxembourg had abandoned its cultural ties to Germany in favour of developing its own nationalism - writers such as Nicolas Ries elevated the status of Luxembourgish to a literary language, and nationalist organisations such as the Letzeburger Nationalunio'n developed, espousing anti-German and anti-French sentiments. Luxembourgish was confirmed as an official and separate language by the Education Law of 1912, which established it as a mandatory school subject. The demographic patterns reversed, with more people immigrating to Luxembourg than emigrating from it, and the politics of Luxembourg had consolidated into three major parties - the socialists of Luxembourg Socialist Workers' Party, the liberals of the Liberal League, and the conservatives of the Rietspartei.

=== First World War ===
The internationally recognised neutrality of Luxembourg from the 1867 revised Treaty of London was violated in 1914 when Luxembourg was occupied by German troops, although the government was left intact and Luxembourg was not incorporated into the German state. While the government officially maintained its neutrality in spite of German occupation, the population sympathised with the Entente forces, and numbers of Luxembourgers joined the French army as a result. The political neutrality that the government maintained during the occupation was a cause of dissent and unrest; German occupation of Luxembourg caused widespread anti-German sentiment, and the monarchy was accused of collaborating with Germany, creating momentum in favour of its abolition. As a result, Marie-Adélaïde, Grand Duchess of Luxembourg abdicated in favour of her sister, Charlotte. Shortly thereafter, in 1919, a referendum was held wherein the public voted in favour of retaining the monarchy, which had become closely affiliated with the major political party, the Party of the Right, in turn having links to the Catholic Church. The war caused social upheaval, which laid the foundation for the first trades union in Luxembourg.

=== Interwar period ===
The end of the occupation in November 1918, squared with a time of uncertainty on the international and national levels. The victorious Allies disapproved of the choices made by the local élites, and some Belgian politicians even demanded the (re)integration of the country into a greater Belgium. Within Luxembourg, a strong minority asked for the creation of a republic. In the end, the grand duchy remained a monarchy but was led by a new head of state, Charlotte. In 1921, it entered into an economic and monetary union with Belgium. During most of the 20th century, however, Germany remained its most important economic partner.

The introduction of universal suffrage for men and women favored the Rechtspartei (Party of the Right) which played the dominant role in the government throughout the 20th century, with the exception of 1925–26 and 1974–79, when the two other important parties, the Liberal and the Social-Democratic parties, formed a coalition. The success of the resulting party was due partly to the support of the church — the population was more than 90 percent Catholic — and of its newspaper, the Luxemburger Wort.

On the international level, the interwar period was characterised by an attempt to put Luxembourg on the map. Especially under Joseph Bech, head of the Department of Foreign Affairs, the country participated more actively in several international organisations, in order to ensure its autonomy. On 16 December 1920 Luxembourg became a member of the League of Nations. On the economic level in the 1920s and the 1930s, the agricultural sector declined in favour of industry, but even more so for the service sector. The proportion of the active population in this last sector rose from 18 percent in 1907 to 31 percent in 1935.

In the 1930s, the internal situation deteriorated, as Luxembourgish politics were influenced by European left- and right-wing politics. The government tried to counter communist-led unrest in the industrial areas and continued friendly policies towards Nazi Germany, which led to much criticism. The attempts to quell unrest peaked with the Maulkuerfgesetz, the "muzzle" Law, which was an attempt to outlaw the Communist Party. The law was turned down in a 1937 referendum.

=== Second World War ===
Upon the outbreak of the Second World War in September 1939, the government of Luxembourg observed its neutrality and issued an official proclamation to that effect on 6 September 1939. On 10 May 1940 an invasion by German armed forces swept away the Luxembourgish government and monarchy into exile. The German troops made up of the 1st, 2nd, and 10th Panzer Divisions invaded at 04:35. They did not encounter any significant resistance save for some bridges destroyed and some land mines since the majority of the Luxembourgish Volunteer Corps stayed in their barracks. Luxembourgish police resisted the German troops, but to little avail and the capital city was occupied before noon. Total Luxembourgish casualties amounted to 75 police and soldiers captured, six police wounded, and one soldier wounded.

The Luxembourg royal family and their entourage received visas from Portuguese consul Aristides de Sousa Mendes in Bordeaux. They crossed into Portugal and subsequently travelled to the United States in two groups: on the USS Trenton from Lisbon to Baltimore in July 1940, and on the Pan American airliner Yankee Clipper in October 1940. Throughout the war, Grand Duchess Charlotte broadcast via the BBC to Luxembourg to give hope to the people.

Luxembourg remained under a Chief of Civil Administration until 1944 and was made a part of the Gau Moselland. The German authorities declared Luxembourgers to be German citizens and called up 13,000 for military service. 2,848 Luxembourgers eventually died fighting in the German army. Luxembourg was de facto incorporated into the Third Reich in 1942, which the German government justified by ‘proclaiming’ that Luxembourgers were ethnically and linguistically German.

An estimated 3,500 Jews lived in Luxembourg before the war; an estimated 1,000 to 2,500 were murdered in the Holocaust.

Luxembourgish opposition to this annexation took the form of passive resistance at first, as in the Spéngelskrich (lit. "War of the Pins"), and in refusal to speak German. As French was forbidden, many Luxembourgers resorted to resuscitating old Luxembourgish words, which led to a renaissance of the language. The Germans met opposition with deportation, forced labour, forced conscription and, more drastically, with internment, deportation to Nazi concentration camps and execution. In October 1941, a census was administered, including questions on jetzige Staatsangehörigkeit (‘current citizenship’), Muttersprache (‘mother tongue’), and Volkszugehörigkeit (‘ethnicity’). An overwhelming majority of the population answered these questions with "Lëtzebuergesch", an act that showed the opposition to Luxembourg's incorporation into the Third Reich, while also emphasising that Luxembourg was not a part of the German nation. This rebellion against Nazi authority is referred to today as dräimol Lëtzebuergesch (‘three times Luxembourgish’). Forced draft of the local population into the German army starting in 1942 resulted in the outbreak of numerous strikes, an event which is referred to today in collective terms as the Generalstreik.

Executions took place after the so-called general strike from 1 to 3 September 1942, which paralysed the administration, agriculture, industry and education in response to the declaration of forced conscription by the German administration on 30 August 1942. The Germans suppressed the strike violently. They executed 21 strikers and deported hundreds more to Nazi concentration camps. The then civilian administrator of Luxembourg, Gauleiter Gustav Simon, had declared conscription necessary to support the German war effort. The general strike in Luxembourg remained one of the few mass strikes against the German war machine in Western Europe.

U.S. forces liberated most of the country in September 1944. They entered the capital city on 10 September 1944. During the Ardennes Offensive (Battle of the Bulge) German troops took back most of northern Luxembourg for a few weeks. Allied forces finally expelled the Germans in January 1945.

Between December 1944 and February 1945, the recently liberated city of Luxembourg was designated by the OB West (German Army Command in the West) as the target for V-3 siege guns, which were originally intended to bombard London. Two V-3 guns based at Lampaden fired a total of 183 rounds at Luxembourg. However, the V-3 was not very accurate. 142 rounds landed in Luxembourg, with 44 confirmed hits in the urban area, and the total casualties were 10 dead and 35 wounded. The bombardments ended with the American Army nearing Lampaden on 22 February 1945.

Altogether, of a pre-war population of 293,000, 5,259 Luxembourgers lost their lives during the hostilities.

== Modern history (since 1945) ==
After World War II, Luxembourg abandoned its politics of neutrality, when it became a founding member of the North Atlantic Treaty Organization (NATO) and the United Nations. It is a signatory of the Treaty of Rome, and constituted a monetary union with Belgium (Benelux Customs Union in 1948), and an economic union with Belgium and the Netherlands, the so-called BeNeLux.

Between 1945 and 2005, the economic structure of Luxembourg changed significantly. The crisis of the metallurgy sector, which began in the mid-1970s and lasted till the late 1980s, nearly pushed the country into economic recession, given the monolithic dominance of that sector. The Tripartite Coordination Committee, consisting of members of the government, management representatives, and trade union leaders, succeeded in preventing major social unrest during those years, thus creating the myth of a “Luxembourg model” characterised by social peace. Although in the early years of the 21st century Luxembourg enjoyed one of the highest GNI per capita in the world, this was mainly due to the strength of its financial sector, which gained importance at the end of the 1960s. Thirty-five years later, one-third of the tax proceeds originated from that sector. The harmonisation of the tax system across Europe could, however, seriously undermine the financial situation of the grand duchy.

Luxembourg has been one of the strongest advocates of the European Union in the tradition of Robert Schuman. It was one of the six founding members of the European Coal and Steel Community (ECSC) in 1952 and of the European Economic Community (EEC) (later the European Union) in 1957; in 1999 it joined the euro currency area.

Encouraged by the contacts established with the Dutch and Belgian governments in exile, Luxembourg pursued a policy of presence in international organisations. In the context of the Cold War, Luxembourg clearly opted for the West, having joined NATO in 1949. Engagement in European reconstruction was rarely questioned subsequently, either by politicians or by the greater population.

Despite its small size, Luxembourg often played an intermediary role between larger countries. This role of mediator, especially between the two large and often bellicose nations of Germany and France, was considered one of the main characteristics of its national identity, allowing the Luxembourgers not to have to choose between one of these two neighbours. The country also hosted a large number of European institutions such as the European Court of Justice.

Luxembourg's small size no longer seemed to be a challenge to the existence of the country, and the creation of the Central Bank of Luxembourg (1998) and of the University of Luxembourg (2003) was evidence of the continuing desire to become a “real” nation. The decision in 1984 to declare Luxembourgish the national language was also a step in the affirmation of the country's independence. In fact, the linguistic situation in Luxembourg was characterised by trilingualism: Luxembourgish was the spoken vernacular language, German the written language, in which Luxembourgers were most fluent, and French the language of official letters and law.

Between 1984 and 1986, the country became victim to a mysterious bombing spree, which was targeted mostly at electrical masts and other installations, without claiming any lives. The perpetrators of what would become known as the "Bommelëer Affair" were never identified.

In 1995, Luxembourgish Prime Minister Jacques Santer was appointed president of the European Commission as a compromise candidate after the nomination of Belgian Prime Minister Jean-Luc Dehaene was vetoed by John Major. Santer and his commission later had to resign in March 1999 over corruption accusations against some commission members.

Prime Minister Jean-Claude Juncker, followed this European tradition. On 10 September 2004, Juncker became the president of the group of finance ministers from the 12 countries that share the euro, a role that led him to be dubbed "Mr Euro".

On 24 December 1999, Grand Duke Jean announced his decision to abdicate the Luxembourgish throne in favour of his son, Henri, who had already served as regent since 4 March 1998. Henri was sworn in as Grand Duke on 7 October 2000, ending the 36-year reign of Jean, over which Luxembourg had seen major transformations.

On 10 July 2005, after Prime Minister Jean-Claude Juncker had threatened to resign in case of a victory of the "no" vote, the proposed European Constitution was approved by 56.52% of voters in a referendum.

In November 2012, RTL and d'Lëtzebuerger Land made allegations concerning misconduct and disorganisation within the State Intelligence Service (SREL), including the transcript of a covertly recorded 2008 conversation between Juncker and SREL head Marco Mille which mentioned links between Grand Duke Henri, MI6 and the Bommelëer Affair. The Chamber of Deputies then opened a parliamentary inquiry which revealed further misconduct, including illegal wiretapping operations, and concluded that Juncker should bear political responsibily for the SREL's actions. After the LSAP pulled from Juncker's coalition government on 10 July 2013, he announced his resignation and the organisation of a snap election.

Following the election, although Juncker's CSV remained the largest party, a coalition between the DP, LSAP and the Greens was formed, with the CSV entering the opposition for the first time since 1979. The DP's Xavier Bettel was sworn in as prime minister on 4 December 2013, succeeding Juncker - who at the time was the EU's longest serving leader - and becoming the world's third openly gay head of government.

In July 2014, the European Parliament elected Juncker as President of the European Commission, making him the third Luxembourger to hold the post. He succeeded Portugal's José Manuel Barroso, who had held the post since 2004, on 1 November 2014.

Following the narrow victory of his liberal-led coalition in the 2018 general election, Xavier Bettel was sworn in for a second term in December of that year. The following year was marked by the death of Grand Duke Jean on 23 April 2019 at age 98, which was followed by a 12-day period of national mourning and a funeral at Luxembourg Cathedral.

On 29 February 2020, in accordance with its 2018 coalition accord, the Bettel II Government implemented free public transport across Luxembourg, making it the first country in the world to implement the measure nationwide.

The October 2023 general election was marked by a sharp electoral defeat for the Greens, which failed to compensate for the DP and LSAP's gains and led to the Bettel II Government losing its majority. With the CSV having once again won the most seats, its leader, former minister Luc Frieden, who returned to politics after a decade-long hiatus, was invited to form a government. The CSV formed a coalition with the DP, with Frieden being sworn in as Prime Minister on 17 November and Bettel remaining in government as Foreign Minister and Deputy Prime Minister.

== See also ==
- List of monarchs of Luxembourg
- List of prime ministers of Luxembourg
- Politics of Luxembourg
- History of rail transport in Luxembourg, 1846 to present day

General:

- History of Europe
