= Monarchy of Luxembourg =

Grand Duke of Principality of Luxembourg
- Groussherzog vu Lëtzebuerg; Grand-duc de Luxembourg
- Arms of the Grand Duke of Luxembourg

Incumbent
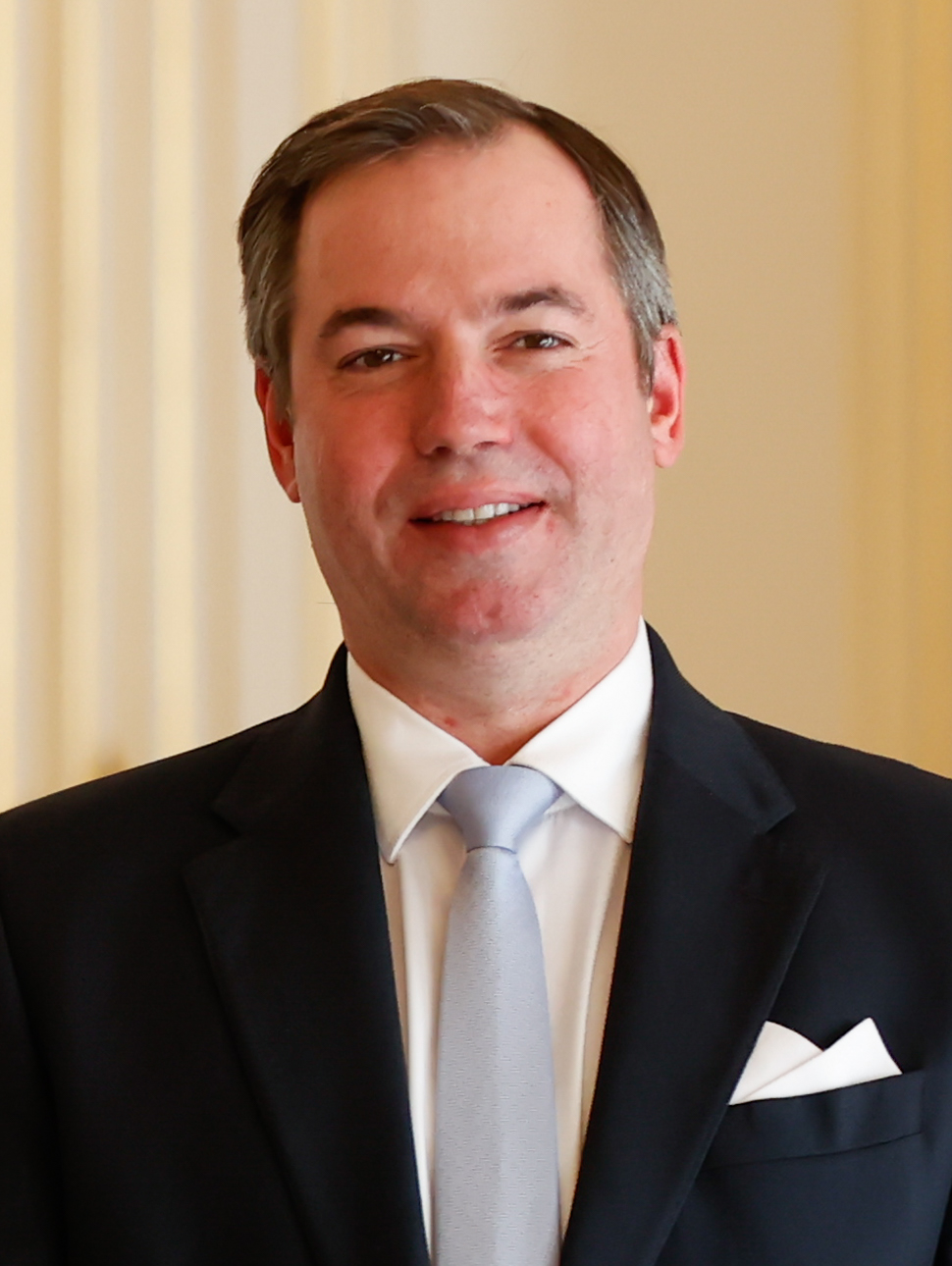
- Guillaume V since 3 October 2025

Details
- Style: His Royal Highness
- Heir apparent: Prince Charles of Luxembourg
- First monarch: William I, King of the Netherlands, Grand Duke of Luxembourg
- Residences: Grand Ducal Palace, Berg Castle, Colmar-Berg
- Website: monarchie.lu/en

The monarchy of Luxembourg is the institution headed by the grand duke of Luxembourg, (Note: Luxembourgish: Groussherzog vu Lëtzebuerg, French: Grand-duc de Luxembourg, German: Großherzog von Luxemburg) who is the head of state of the country. Luxembourg has been a grand duchy since 15 March 1815, when it was created from territory of the former Duchy of Luxembourg. It was in personal union with the United Kingdom of the Netherlands until 1890 under the House of Orange-Nassau. Luxembourg is the world's only sovereign grand duchy, and since 1815 there have been ten monarchs, including the incumbent, Guillaume V.

== Constitutional role ==
The constitution of Luxembourg defines the grand duke's position:

The grand duke is the head of state, symbol of its unity, and guarantor of national independence. He exercises executive power in accordance with the constitution and the laws of the country.

After a constitutional change (to article 34) in December 2008 resulting from Henri's refusal to assent to a law legalizing euthanasia, laws now no longer require the grand duke's formal assent (implying "approval"), but his task of promulgating the law as chief executive remains.

== Compensation ==
The grand duke does not receive a salary, but the grand ducal family receives annually 300,000 gold francs (€281,000) for grand ducal functions. In 2017, the Luxembourg budget included €10.1 million for the grand duke's household costs.

== Succession ==
Succession to the throne was governed by Salic law, as dictated by the Nassau Family Pact, first adopted on 30 June 1783. The right to reign over Luxembourg was until June 2011 passed by agnatic-cognatic primogeniture within the House of Nassau, as stipulated under the 1815 Final Act of the Congress of Vienna and as confirmed by the 1867 Treaty of London. In June 2011, agnatic primogeniture was replaced with absolute primogeniture, allowing any legitimate female descendants within the House of Nassau to be included in the line of succession. The Nassau Family Pact itself can be amended by the usual legislative process, having been so on 10 July 1907 to exclude the Count of Merenberg branch of the House, which was descended from a morganatic marriage.

An heir apparent may be granted the style "hereditary grand duke" once they reach the age of eighteen.

== Full titles ==
The traditional titulatures of the Grand Duke are By the Grace of God, Grand Duke of Luxembourg, Duke of Nassau, Count Palatine of the Rhine, Count of Sayn, Königstein, Katzenelnbogen and Diez, Burgrave of Hammerstein, Lord of Mahlberg, Wiesbaden, Idstein, Merenberg, Limburg and Eppstein.

It should, however, be noted that many of the titles are held without regard to the strict rules of Salic inheritance and that most, save for Grand Duke of Luxembourg and Duke of Nassau, are simply not used.

== List of Grand Dukes ==
=== House of Orange-Nassau ===
Portrait	Name	Lifespan	Reign start	Reign end	Titles	Claim
	Guillaume I	24 August 1772 – 12 December 1843	15 March 1815	7 October 1840 (abdicated)	King of the Netherlands; Grand Duke of Luxembourg	Congress of Vienna
	Guillaume II	6 December 1792 – 17 March 1849	7 October 1840	17 March 1849	King of the Netherlands; Grand Duke of Luxembourg	Son of Guillaume I
	Guillaume III	17 February 1817 – 23 November 1890	17 March 1849	23 November 1890	King of the Netherlands; Grand Duke of Luxembourg	Son of Guillaume II

=== House of Nassau-Weilburg ===
Under the 1783 Nassau Family Pact, Luxembourg and Nassau — the Nassau family's territories within the Holy Roman Empire — were governed by semi-Salic law succession law, which permitted inheritance through the female line only upon the total extinction of male members of the dynasty. The Netherlands, however, was not party to this pact and operated under its own succession rules. When William III died leaving only his daughter Wilhelmina as an heir in 1890, these two frameworks produced divergent outcomes: Wilhelmina inherited the Dutch crown under Dutch law without restriction, while the crown of Luxembourg passed instead to Adolphe, the dispossessed Duke of Nassau and head of the branch of Nassau-Weilburg — since he, as a surviving male of the dynasty, precluded female succession under the Family Pact.

In 1905, Grand Duke Adolphe's younger half-brother, Prince Nikolaus Wilhelm of Nassau, died, having left a son Georg Nikolaus, Count von Merenberg who was, however, the product of a morganatic marriage, and therefore not legally a member of the House of Nassau. In 1907, Adolphe's only son, William IV, Grand Duke of Luxembourg, obtained passage of a law confirming the right of his eldest daughter, Marie-Adélaïde, to succeed to the throne in virtue of the absence of any remaining dynastic males of the House of Nassau, as originally stipulated in the Nassau Family Pact. She became the grand duchy's first reigning female monarch upon her father's death in 1912, and upon her own abdication in 1919 was succeeded by her younger sister Charlotte, who married Felix of Bourbon-Parma, a prince of the former Duchy of Parma. Charlotte's descendants have since reigned as the continued dynasty of Nassau.

Portrait	Name	Lifespan	Reign start	Reign end	Titles	Claim
	Adolphe	24 July 1817 – 17 November 1905 (88 years)	23 November 1890	17 November 1905	Grand Duke of Luxembourg; Duke of Nassau	Third cousin of Guillaume III
	Guillaume IV	22 April 1852 – 25 February 1912 (59 years)	17 November 1905	25 February 1912	Grand Duke of Luxembourg; Duke of Nassau	Son of Adolphe
	Marie-Adélaïde	14 June 1894 – 24 January 1924 (29 years)	25 February 1912	14 January 1919 (abdicated)	Grand Duchess of Luxembourg; Duchess of Nassau	Daughter of Guillaume IV
	Charlotte	23 January 1896 – 9 July 1985 (89 years)	14 January 1919	12 November 1964 (abdicated)	Grand Duchess of Luxembourg; Duchess of Nassau	Daughter of Guillaume IV; Sister of Marie-Adélaïde

=== House of Luxembourg-Nassau ===
The House of Luxembourg-Nassau originated in 1919 with the marriage of Grand Duchess Charlotte, Grand Duchess of Luxembourg (of the House of Nassau‑Weilburg) to Prince Félix of Bourbon‑Parma (of the House of Bourbon-Parma). Their eldest son, Jean, Grand Duke of Luxembourg (born 5 January 1921), succeeded to the throne in 1964, thus establishing the present ruling dynasty. Although the male‑line (agnatic) descent is from Bourbon‑Parma, the dynasty continues to be styled “Luxembourg‑Nassau” to reflect the historic Nassau‑Weilburg legacy maintained through Charlotte and the links with Luxembourg.

Portrait	Name	Lifespan	Reign start	Reign end	Titles	Claim
	Jean	5 January 1921 – 23 April 2019 (98 years)	12 November 1964	7 October 2000 (abdicated)	Grand Duke of Luxembourg; Duke of Nassau; Prince of Bourbon-Parma	Son of Charlotte
	Henri	16 April 1955 (71 years)	7 October 2000	3 October 2025 (abdicated)	Grand Duke of Luxembourg; Duke of Nassau; Prince of Bourbon-Parma	Son of Jean
	Guillaume V	11 November 1981 (45 years)	3 October 2025	Incumbent	Grand Duke of Luxembourg; Duke of Nassau; Prince of Bourbon-Parma	Son of Henri

== Grand ducal consorts ==
- Princess Wilhelmine of Prussia (first wife of Grand Duke William I)
- Grand Duchess Anna Pavlovna of Russia (wife of Grand Duke William II)
- Princess Sophie of Württemberg (first wife of Grand Duke William III)
- Princess Emma of Waldeck and Pyrmont (second wife of Grand Duke William III)
- Princess Adelheid-Marie of Anhalt-Dessau (wife of Grand Duke Adolphe)
- Infanta Marie Anne of Portugal (wife of Grand Duke William IV)
- Prince Felix of Bourbon-Parma (husband of Grand Duchess Charlotte)
- Princess Joséphine-Charlotte of Belgium (wife of Grand Duke Jean)
- María Teresa Mestre y Batista (wife of Grand Duke Henri)
- Countess Stéphanie de Lannoy (wife of Grand Duke Guillaume V)
