= Music of Luxembourg =

The Music of Luxembourg is an important component of the country's cultural life. The new Philharmonie concert hall provides a venue for orchestral concerts while opera is frequently presented in the theatres. Rock, pop and jazz are also popular with a number of successful performers. The wide general interest in music and musical activities in Luxembourg can be seen from the membership of the Union Grand-Duc Adolphe, the national music federation for choral societies, brass bands, music schools, theatrical societies, folklore associations and instrumental groups. Some 340 music groups and associations with over 17,000 individual members are currently represented by the organization.

== History ==
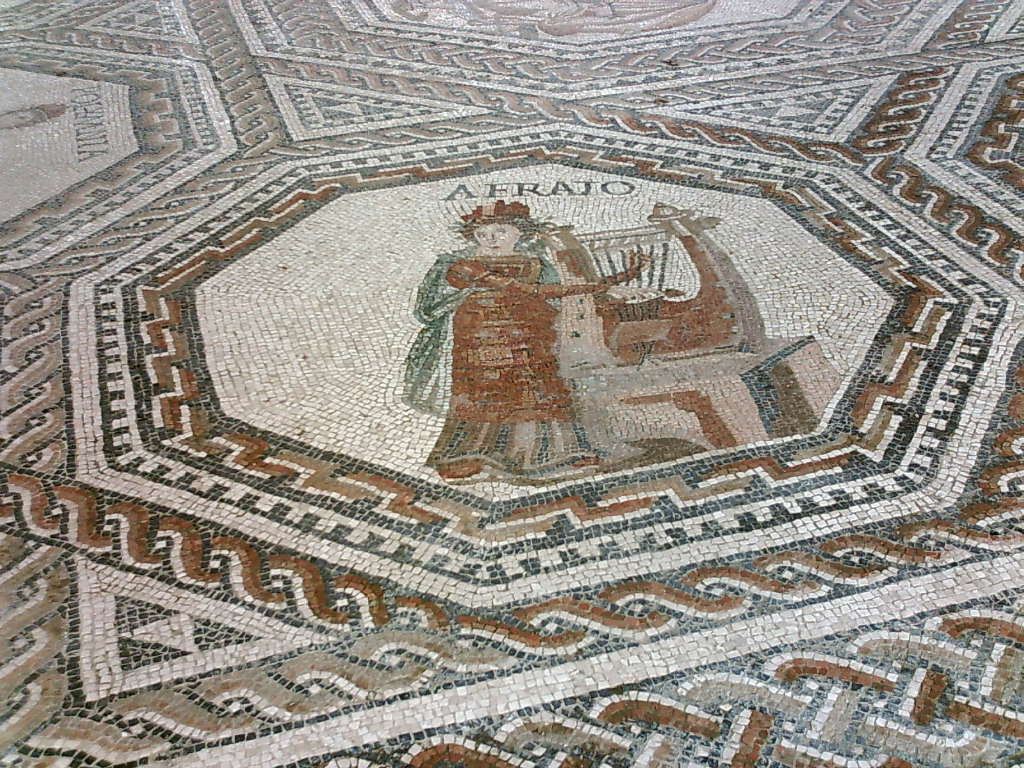
Erato, Vichten mosaic, 3rd century

Music in what is now the Grand Duchy of Luxembourg has a history stretching back to the Gallo-Roman period. The 3rd-century Roman mosaic from Vichten presents excellent representations of the muses Euterpe with her flutes and Erato playing the lyre, testifying to an early interest in music. The 6th-century Latin poet Venantius Fortunatus tells us he was impressed by the music he heard in the region. From the 8th century, the Abbey of Echternach became an important centre for church music. Around the year 900, the abbey produced the Officium Sancti Willibrordi manuscript, one of the first examples of musical notation from Luxembourg.

After the Grand Duchy was established in 1815, interest in music slowly developed across the country, initially with patriotic music played by military bands. In 1842, the Luxembourg Army Band known as the Musique militaries grand-ducale was found in Echternach with some 24 musicians from the battalion stationed there. In 1852, the Société philharmonique was founded in Ettelbrück by the local priest J. B. Victor Müllendorf with the objective of "supporting all types of vocal and instrumental music". On the occasion of the first train from Luxembourg to Thionville on 4 October 1859, the national poet Michel Lentz wrote the words and music for De Feierwon, a patriotic song with the famous line Mir welle bleiwe wat mir sin (We want to remain as we are).

In the middle of the 19th century, music and singing societies became increasingly popular. A series of local composers wrote vocal music and light pieces to be performed by the brass bands and choirs which were also emerging everywhere. They included Joseph-Alexandre Müller, Louis Beicht and Emile Boeres as well as Gustave Kahnt and Pol Albrecht who, apart from being prolific composers, were bandmasters for the Luxembourg Band.

== Overview ==
Luxembourg's music and cultural heritage is Germanic. The national music federation is the Union Grand-Duc Adolphe (UGDA); another important institution is the Luxembourg Conservatory of Music with some 2,600 students each year. Annual music festivals include the Echternach Music Festival and the Rock um Knuedler in Luxembourg City. The national radio station, Radio Luxembourg, is listened to throughout Europe. Modern Luxembourg is home to an array of performers with the rise of folk, classical, popular music (pop, rock, hip hop) and electronic dance music (hardstyle, jumpstyle).

The national anthem is "Ons Heemecht" ("Our Homeland"), which was composed and written by Jean-Antoine Zinnen and Michel Lentz. It has been the national anthem since 1895.

=== Classical music ===
One of the most influential and versatile musicians in Luxembourg was Laurent Menager (1835–1902). Often referred to as Luxembourg's national composer, he was also an enthusiastic choirmaster, organist and teacher. In 1857, he founded the national choral association Sang a Klang. His many compositions include choral works, church music, orchestral pieces and operettas as well as music for brass bands and the theatre.

The Luxembourg Philharmonic Orchestra, originally known as the RTL Grand Symphony Orchestra, was founded in 1933. Since 2005, when the Philharmonie Luxembourg concert hall was opened, the orchestra has had its own home. Recent directors have done much to enhance its image, particularly in regard to 20th-century French music. Opera is frequently performed in Luxembourg City at the Grand Théâtre and in Esch-sur-Alzette at the Théâtre d’Esch as well as at the annual Wiltz festival.

Luxembourg's internationally recognized soloists include violinist Sandrine Cantoreggi, cellist Françoise Groben, pianists Francesco Tristano Schlimé and Jean Muller, and singer Mariette Kemmer. Among its contemporary composers are Camille Kerger, Catherine Kontz, Claude Lenners, Georges Lentz (probably the most renowned internationally, although he lives mainly in Australia), Alexander Mullenbach and Marcel Wengler. Since 1999, the Luxembourg Sinfonietta orchestra has done much to promote contemporary music, not only by performing Luxembourg works at home and abroad but by organizing annual international competitions for contemporary composers.

The Luxembourg-based ensemble The Art of Music was founded in 1993. With approximately seven members, it specialises in singing Renaissance religious music, with some medieval repertoire as well. As of 2018, it had published 11 CDs.

=== Jazz ===
Jazz is in Luxembourg with artists such as trumpeters Ernie Hammes and Gast Waltzing, pianist Michel Reis and percussionist Pascal Schumacher. Waltzing has gained a name as a composer of film and TV music while Schumacher has performed worldwide with his Pascal Schumacher Quartet.

=== Folk, rock, pop ===
Serge Tonnar & Legotrip sing in Luxembourgish mainly about small and bigger idiosyncrasies of Luxembourg life and politics. Some albums: Klasseklon, Legotrip, Pärele bei d'sei, and a single: "Wat der Noper seet".

Kate, a five-member indy-folk-pop group (started in 2008, first album in 2010, titled Can't keep Secrets), brought out its second album Life in Stereo in 2012 with a new pianist, Tom.

Luxembourg was a founding participant of the Eurovision Song Contest, and participated every year between 1956 and 1993, with the exception of 1959, and returned to the contest in 2024. It won the competition a total of five times, 1961, 1965, 1972, 1973 and 1983 and hosted the contest in 1962, 1966, 1973, and 1984. The Grand Duchy's last entry was in 1993. Luxembourg's most famous entry is perhaps Poupée de cire, poupée de son, penned by French composer Serge Gainsbourg and performed by the French artist France Gall. Only eight of its 38 entries were performed by Luxembourgish artists. Three of the entries were performed in Luxembourgish: "So laang we's du do bast" by Camillo Felgen in 1960, "Sou fräi" by Marion Welter and Kontinent in 1992, and "Donne-moi une chance" by Modern Times in 1993.

There is a small but active metal music scene, with a handful of bands known to have played various European Metal festivals. Notable is the band Pronoian Made, the first to play gothic influenced metal in the country.

Though formed in London and being labeled a British band, Placebo have close ties to Luxembourg, as two members attended the American School of Luxembourg (now International School of Luxembourg).

=== Hip Hop ===
In 2002, hip hop group The Gentles [de] (formerly known as: Gentle MC's) was formed in Petange and they performed lyrics in Luxembourgish, German, French and English. In 2003, they released their debut single "Firwat" as a campaign against drunk driving in Luxembourg and reached the local radio charts. The song was also recorded in English, titled "Why", and released in 2004. The group's album Gentle Attitude was released in 2005, additional with two singles "Empfäng der deen Toun?" and the French title "L'abandon de nos familles".

On 10 October 2018 rapper Turnup Tun (real name: Tun Tonnar) - son of musician Serge Tonnar - released his song "FCK LXB", a political statement against right-wing politics in Luxembourg (see Politics of Luxembourg). The song sparked controversy national and the rapper had to face court in March 2019, following complains by right-wing politicians. In the song, Turnup Tun takes aim at several politicians, including Fred Keup, Joe Thein and Tom Weidig, a candidate for the ADR (Alternative Democratic Reformparty) in the 2018 election in Luxembourg who later became a member of the Chamber of Deputies. He also named Daniel Schmitz, an online personality known for his xenophobic statements. Keup, Thein and Schmitz pressed charges for slander and feeling personally offended by the song's lyrics, which goes: "Féck de Fred Keup (...) Féck de Joe Thein (...) Féck den Dan Schmitz" (translated: "Fuck Fred Keup (...) Fuck Joe Thein (...) Fuck Dan Schmitz").
