= List of Luxembourgish composers =

The following is a list of Luxembourgish composers.

== A ==
- Pol Albrecht (1874–1975)

== B ==
- Louis Beicht (1886–1943)
- Tom Bimmermann (b. 1971)
- Emile Boeres (1890–1944)
- Ivan Boumans (1983)
- Alexis Brasseur (1860–1924)
- Helen Buchholtz (1877–1953)

== C ==
- Pierre Cao (b. 1937)
- Walter Civitareale (b. 1954)

== D ==
- Paul Dahm (b. 1951)
- Philippe Decker (1840–1881)

== E ==
- Pierre Even (b. 1946)

== F ==
- Johny Fritz (b. 1944)

== H ==
- Dominique Heckmes (1878–1938)
- Julien Hoffmann (b. 1924)

== K ==
- Gustave Kahnt (1848–1923)
- Jean-Pierre Kemmer (1923–1991)
- Camille Kerger (b. 1957)
- Jean-Marie Kieffer (b. 1960)
- Lou Koster (1889–1973)

== L ==
- Claude Lenners (b. 1956)
- Georges Lentz (b. 1965)

== M ==
- Laurent Menager (1835–1902)
- Alexander Mullenbach (b. 1949)
- Joseph-Alexandre Müller (1854-1931)

== P ==
- Henri Pensis (1900–1958)
- Albena Petrovic-Vratchanska (b. 1965)

== S ==
- Francesco Tristano Schlimé (b. 1981)

== T ==
- J. B. Tresch (1773–1821)

== W ==
- Gast Waltzing (b. 1956)
- Marcel Wengler (b. 1947)

== Z ==
- Jean Antoine Zinnen (1827–1898)
