= Pol Albrecht =

Luxembourgish composer, conductor, and bandmaster

Pol Albrecht (23 May 1874 – 8 May 1975) was a Luxembourgish composer, conductor and bandmaster.

== Biography ==
Born in Luxembourg City on 23 May 1874, Albrecht published his first marches in 1903. In 1909, he set to music a text by his friend Demy Schlechter creating the first of a long series of theatrical works. Leader of many choral societies and brass bands, he became deputy bandmaster of the Luxembourg Army Band in 1927 and bandmaster in 1937. For 10 years he was a member of the jury of the Union Grand-Duc Adolphe and also served as a judge at numerous music festivals.

In 1974, on the occasion of the celebrations for his 100th birthday which he attended in the presence of Grand Duke Jean and Grand Duchess Joséphine-Charlotte at the Municipal Theatre, the Army Band played some of his finest works. Considered to be one of Luxembourg's leading musical figures, he wrote 83 songs, including 18 for choir, 73 marches, overtures, dances and religious compositions as well as an impressive number of other works. Many of them remain part of the national repertoire and are frequently performed by choirs and brass bands.

He died in Luxembourg City at the age of 100 on 8 May 1975.
