= Union Grand-Duc Adolphe =

The Union Grand-Duc Adolphe is the umbrella organization for music interests in Luxembourg, representing choral societies, brass bands, music schools, theatrical societies, folklore associations and instrumental groups. Covering some 340 societies, it has over 17,000 individual members.

== History ==
On 6 September 1863, the Allgemeiner Luxemburger Musikverein (ALM) was founded to represent the interests of 26 music and choral societies in Luxembourg. The honorary president was Prince Henry of the Netherlands, the president August Fischer, a member of the Chamber of Deputies and a city councilor, and the director Jean-Antoine Zinnen, the national composer. On 15 June 1864, the first ALM festival was held in Ettelbrück with a choral rendering of the patriotic poem Ons Hémecht written by Michel Lentz and set to music by Zinnen. The following year, at a music festival in Vianden, it was sung to an instrumental accompaniment for the first time.

By the end of the 1880s, the ALM was no longer effective. On 31 March 1891, meeting in Luxembourg city hall, the representatives of 116 music and theatrical organizations revived the federation, renaming it the Adolph-Verband as it officially enjoyed the patronage of Grand Duke Adolphe. Léon Metz, mayor of Esch-sur-Alzette was its first president, Philippe Manternach was the music director and Laurent Menager the choral director. In 1919, the name of the organization became Union Adolphe which, in 1947, was finally modified to Union Grand-Duc Adolphe (UGDA), then representing 174 music societies. The UGDA set up a permanent office on the Place d'Armes in 1956 and, in 1969, moved into a new seat in the renovated Van der Vekene House in the Grund. Since 1986, when it came under the patronage of Grand Duke Jean and Grand Duchess Charlotte, the UGDA has created its own music schools and has generally promoted interest in music by organizing concerts and workshops.

By 1993, the UGDA Music School was providing instruction to some 2,000 individuals in 90 different localities throughout the Grand Duchy. Celebrating its 140th anniversary on 29 June 2004, the UGDA launched a music festival entitled Musique pour tous (Music for All). Its music school now had some 3,600 students in 65 municipalities. On 29 May 2005, in connection with celebrations for the Luxembourg presidency of the Council of the European Union, 850 musicians, singers and dancers performed on the Grand-Place in Brussels.

== Music school ==
Recognized in 1991 as an establishment of public interest, the UGDA Music School is responsible for music teaching in 67 municipalities throughout the Grand Duchy of Luxembourg. The school's courses are arranged in close collaboration with local music societies. With over 180 teaching staff, some 4,800 students were expected to register for the 2010/2011 academic year.
