= De Wilhelmus =

Grand ducal anthem of Luxembourg

English: The Wilhelmus
- Grand ducal anthem of Luxembourg
- Lyrics: Nik Welter, 1919
- Music: Unknown, 16th century
- Adopted: 1919

"De Wilhelmus" (pronounced [də vilˈhælmus]; Luxembourgish for "The Wilhelmus") is the grand ducal anthem of Luxembourg. Lyrics for it were written in 1919 by Luxembourgish writer Nik Welter, although they are not often used in official performances. The anthem is performed whenever a member of the grand ducal family enters or leaves an official ceremony, while the national anthem, "Ons Heemecht", is performed at national celebrations. It takes its name from the Dutch national anthem, but it has always since then been written with the Luxembourgish masculine article De as opposed to its namesake, written without or with the Dutch neutral article Het.

== History ==
"De Wilhelmus" shares a common origin with the Dutch national anthem, "Het Wilhelmus", which dates back to the 16th century, and is thought to be a trumpet call or cavalry charge typical of militaristic traditions from the period. Luxembourg was in personal union with the Netherlands and this melody was introduced in 1883 during the visit of Grand Duke William III as a part of a parade titled Vive le Roi, Vive la Reine ("Long live the King, Long live the Queen"). Even after the end of the personal union, the tune was used for parades and ceremonies.

In 1915, Luxembourgish author Willy Georgen wrote the first lyrics for the anthem, to commemorate the 1815 Congress of Vienna. Although his lyrics were supported by Grand Duchess Marie-Adélaïde, World War I and her 1919 abdication in favour of her sister Charlotte after suspicions of pro-German sentiment meant Georgen's lyrics were not officially adopted.

In 1919, Luxembourgish writer Nik Welter wrote lyrics for the melody on the occasion of the wedding of Grand Duchess Charlotte and Prince Félix on 6 November that year. The anthem with Welter's words was first performed on 23 January 1920, Charlotte's 24th birthday, at the Te Deum service at Notre-Dame Cathedral by the cathedral choir, as an "anthem for the House of Luxembourg-Nassau-Bourbon". Around the same time, cathedral organist Jean-Pierre Beicht harmonised the anthem for a four-piece choir. Welter subsequently dropped the first verse he had written for the anthem, which was marked too strongly by the events of the time, leaving it with the present version.

In 1939, six months before the German invasion of Luxembourg, a slightly altered version of Willy Georgen's 1915 lyrics was published, but it proved unpopular.

== Lyrics ==
Although Welter's 1919 lyrics from 1919 remain official today, most Luxembourgers do not know them, as typically only the music is played on official occasions.

=== Second lyrics ===
Luxembourgish original

I
Zwee Kinnékskanner, déi trei sech léif,
koumen ausenaaner, wäit an déif.
Zwee Kinnékskanner, déi trei sech léif,
hu gebaangt, op d'Gléck nach bléie géif.
Haut weisen si der ganzer Welt
an engem Feld
d'Goldlilie mat dem roude Krouneléif.
Haut steet ëm si voll Freed, Hand an Hand,
d'Vollék vun dem Lëtzebuerger Land.

II
Nun as verbäi de Stuurm, d'Nout as aus,
d'Menschheet trëtt erléist an d'Liicht eraus.
Nun as verbäi de Stuurm, d'Nout as aus:
Lëtzebuerg bleift Här am eegnen Haus.
Den Himmel huet no laanger Nuecht
d'neit Freijor bruecht
a rëscht all Dir mat grénger Friddensstrauss.
Lo steet erem sou frou, Hand an Hand,
Grouss a Kleng am Lëtzebuerger Land.

III
Mir hun a schwéirer Zäit Trei bekannt,
't gong fir d'Fräiheet an et gong fir d'Land.
Mir hun a schwéirer Zäit Trei bekannt,
d'Éier agesat zum Ënnerpand.
A wann eng nei Gefor en dreet,
mir si bereet,
mir haale nees mat Häärz a Wëlle stand.
Da steet rem staark a stolz, Hand an Hand,
d'Vollék vun dem Lëtzebuerger Land.

IV
Sou wäärd et ëmmerzou eneg ston,
voll Vertraue Gléck an Ongléck dron.
Sou wäärd et ëmmerzou eneg ston,
frou seng Flicht géint Troun an Hemecht don.
E staarke Stamm an aler Äärd
an duebel wäärt,
mat fräier Kroun voll Saaft a Sonn ze ston.
O Härgott, schiirm a leet, Hand an Hand,
d'Vollék vun dem Lëtzebuerger Land!

IPA transcription

1
[tsweː ˈki(n)neksˌkɑ(n)nɐ dɜɪ̯ tʀɑɪ̯ zəɕ lɜɪ̯f
ˈkəʊ̯mən ˈɑʊ̯zəˌnaːnɐ væːɪ̯d ɑn dɜɪ̯f
tsweː ˈki(n)neksˌkɑ(n)nɐ dɜɪ̯ tʀɑɪ̯ zəɕ lɜɪ̯f
hu ɡəˈbaːŋd op tɡlek nɑχ ˈblɜɪ̯ə ɡɜɪ̯f
hɑʊ̯t ˈvɑɪ̯zən zi dɐ ˈɡɑntsɐ væld
ɑn ˈæŋəm fæl
dɡoldˈlili̯ə mɑt dəm ˈʀəʊ̯də ˈkʀəʊ̯nəˌlɜɪ̯f
hɑʊ̯t ʃteːd əm zi fol(ː) fʀeːt hɑnd ɑn hɑnt
ˈtfo(l)lek fun dəm ˈlətsəˌbu̯əjɐ lɑnt]

2
[nun ɑs fɐˈbæːɪ̯ də ʃtuːɐ̯m (d)nəʊ̯d ɑz ɑʊ̯s
ˈ(d)mænʃheːt tʀət(ː) ɐˈlɜɪ̯zd ɑn dliːʑd əˈʀɑʊ̯s
nun ɑs fɐˈbæːɪ̯ də ʃtuːɐ̯m (d)nəʊ̯d ɑz ɑʊ̯s
ˈlətsəˌbu̯əɕ blɑɪ̯ft hɛːɐ̯ ɑm ˈeːʑnən hɑʊ̯s
dən ˈhiməl hu̯ət no ˈlaːŋɐ nu̯əɕt
nɑɪ̯t ˈfʀɑɪ̯joːɐ̯ bʀu̯əɕt
ɑ ʀəʒd ɑl(ː) diːɐ̯ mɑt ˈɡʀeŋɐ ˈfʀidənsˌʃtʀɑʊ̯s(ː)
lo ʃteːd əˈʀəm zəʊ̯ fʀəʊ̯ hɑnd ɑn hɑnt
ɡʀəʊ̯s(ː) ɑ klæŋ ɑm ˈlətsəˌbu̯əjɐ lɑnt]

3
[miːɐ̯ hun ɑ ˈʃvɜɪ̯ʀɐ tsæːɪ̯t tʀɑɪ̯ bəˈkɑnt
ɡoŋ fiːɐ̯ ˈtfʀæːɪ̯heːt ɑn ət ɡoŋ fiːɐ̯ dlɑnt
miːɐ̯ hun ɑ ˈʃvɜɪ̯ʀɐ tsæːɪ̯t tʀɑɪ̯ bəˈkɑnt
ˈdɜɪ̯ɐ ˈaːɡəˌzɑt tsum ˈə(n)nɐˌpɑnt
ɑ vɑn(ː) eŋ nɑɪ̯ ɡəˈfoːɐ̯ ən dʀeːt
miːɐ̯ zi bəˈʀeːt
miːɐ̯ ˈhaːlə neːs mɑt hɛːɐ̯dz ɑ ˈvə(l)lə ʃtɑnt
dɑ ʃteːt ʀəm ʃtaːχk ɑ ʃtolts hɑnd ɑn hɑnt
ˈtfo(l)lek fun dəm ˈlətsəˌbu̯əjɐ lɑnt]

4
[zəʊ̯ vɛːɐ̯d əd ˈə(m)mɐˌtsəʊ̯ ˈeːnəɕ ʃton
fol(ː) fɐˈtʀɑʊ̯ə ɡlek ɑn ˈonɡlek dʀon
zəʊ̯ vɛːɐ̯d əd ˈə(m)mɐˌtsəʊ̯ ˈeːnəɕ ʃton
fʀəʊ̯ zæŋ fliɕt ɡɜɪ̯nt tʀəʊ̯n ɑn ˈheːməɕt don
ə ˈʃtaːχkə ʃtɑm(ː) ɑn ˈɑlɐ ɛːɐ̯t
ɑn ˈdu̯əbəl vɛːɐ̯t
mɑt ˈfʀæːɪ̯ɐ kʀəʊ̯n fol(ː) zaːvd ɑ zon(ː) tsə ʃton
o ˈhɛːɐ̯ɡot(ː) ʃiːɐ̯m ɑ leːt hɑnd ɑn hɑnt
ˈtfo(l)lek fun dəm ˈlətsəˌbu̯əjɐ lɑnt]

=== Original lyrics ===
Luxembourgish original

I
Zwê Kinnekskanner, de' trei sech le'f,
ko'men ausenâner weit an de'f;
Zwê Kinnekskanner, de' trei sech le'f,
hunn och stëll gebiet datt Fridde ge'f:
Haut weisen si der ganzer Welt
en engem Feld
d'Goldlilje mat dem ro'de Kro'nele'w;
Haut dron s'a jongem Glëck Hand an Hand
d'Hoffnonk vun dem Letzeburger Land.

II
D'Wilhelmusweis voll Mutt, Krâft a Schwonk
fle'ßt durch d'Blutt ons we' e Feierdronk:
d'Wilhelmusweis voll Mutt, Krâft a Schwonk
mëcht âl Hierzer an âl Zeite jonk.
An op de Fielzen un der Our
de wei en Tur
hieft himmelhe'ch eng sche'n Erënneronk.
Haut dre't e stolzt Geschlecht Hand an Hand
Nuem a Le'ft vum Letzeburger Land.

III
Mir hunn a schwe'rer Zeit Trei bekannt,
t'gong fir d'Freihét an et gong fir d'Land;
mir hunn a schwe'rer Zeit Trei bekannt,
d'E'er agesat zum Ennerpand.
A wann eng nei Gefôr en drêt,
mir si berêt,
mir halen nês mat Hierz a Wëlle stand;
Da stêt rem fro' a stolz Hand an Hand
Gro'ß a Kleng am Letzeburger Land.

IV
So' werden s'ëmmerzo' êneg gôn,
Fürst a Vollek Frêd we' Lêd mat drôn;
So' werden s'ëmmerzo' êneg gôn,
Ganz hir Pflicht ge'nt sech an d'Hémecht dôn;
E starke Stâm an âler Erd,
an duebel wert
mat freier Kro'n voll Saft a Sonn ze stôn.
O Herrgott, lêt du trei Hand an Hand
d'Kanner vun dem Letzeburger Land!

English translation

I
Two royal children in true love
became separated widely and deeply;
two royal children in true love
also prayed silently for peace:
Today, they show to the entire world
in a field
the gold lilies with the red Crown Lion;
today, they bear in young happiness, hand in hand,
the hope of the Luxembourg land.

II
Now the storm is over, misery is gone,
all mankind walks freely into the light.
Now the storm is over, misery is gone:
Luxembourg remains master in its own house.
After a long night, the sky brought us
a new spring
and gives to you a green bunch of peace.
Let us stand happily together, hand in hand,
Great and small in the Luxembourg land.

III
We have proclaimed loyalty in hard times,
have stood upright for freedom and for the country.
We have proclaimed loyalty in hard times,
have provided it to you as your pledge.
And when new danger threatens you,
we are ready,
We stand steadfast with heart and desire.
There it stands strong and proud, hand in hand,
The people of the Luxembourg land.

IV
So it will ever stand united,
trustful in joy and misfortune.
So it will ever stand united,
happily perform its duty for throne and country.
A strong trunk on ancient soil
and twice worthy,
rising its strong top freely towards the sun.
O Lord God, protect and guide, hand in hand,
The people of the Luxembourg land!

German translation

I
Zwei Königskinder, die treu sich lieben,
wurden getrennt weit und tief;
zwei Königskinder, die treu sich lieben,
haben auch still gebetet, dass es Frieden gebe:
Heute zeigen sie der ganzen Welt
die Goldlilie mit dem roten Kronenlöwen
in einem Feld;
Heute tragen sie in jungem Glück, Hand in Hand,
die Hoffnung des Luxemburger Landes.

II
Nun ist der Sturm vorbei, die Not ist weg,
die Menschheit tritt erlöst ins Licht heraus.
Nun ist der Sturm vorbei, die Not ist weg:
Luxemburg bleibt Herr im eigenen Haus.
Am Himmel ist nicht länger Nacht,
er hat einen neuen Frühling gebracht
und reicht dir einen grünen Friedensstrauß.
Lasst uns so froh zusammenstehen, Hand in Hand,
Groß und Klein im Luxemburger Land.

III
Wir haben in schwerer Zeit Treue bekannt,
haben aufrecht für Freiheit und für das Land gestanden.
Wir haben in schwerer Zeit Treue bekannt,
haben, sofern sie für Sie als ihr Versprechen.
Und wenn neue Gefahr droht ihnen,
wir sind bereit,
Wir stehen standhaft mit Herz und Lust.
Dort steht er stark und stolz, Hand in Hand,
Die Menschen des Landes Luxemburg.

IV
So wird es immer vereint, stehen
vertrauensvolle in Freude und Unglück.
So wird es immer vereint, stehen
glücklich Erfüllung seiner Pflicht für Thron und Land.
Ein starker Stamm auf alten Böden
und zweimal verdient,
steigende seine starke oben frei in Richtung der Sonne.
O Herr, Gott, schützen und leiten, Hand in Hand,
Die Menschen im Luxemburg Land!

French translation

I
Deux enfants royaux dans véritable amour
ont été séparés largement et profondément;
deux enfants royaux dans véritable amour
également prié en silence pour la paix:
Aujourd'hui, ils montrent à l' monde entier
les lys d'or avec le rouge de la Couronne Lion
dans un champ;
aujourd'hui, ils portent dans le bonheur des jeunes, main dans la main,
l'espoir de la terre Luxembourg.

II
Maintenant, la tempête est terminée, c'est la misère disparu,
l'humanité tout entière déambule librement dans la lumière.
Maintenant, la tempête est terminée, la misère a disparu:
Luxembourg reste le maître dans sa propre maison.
Après une longue nuit, le ciel nous a apporté
une nouveau printemps
et donne à vous un bouquet vert de la paix.
Levons-nous heureux ensemble, main dans la main,
Grands et petits dans le pays Luxembourg.

III
Nous avons proclamé la loyauté dans les moments difficiles,
ont se tenait debout pour la liberté et pour le pays.
Nous avons proclamé la loyauté dans les moments difficiles,
lui ont fourni à vous comme votre promesse.
Et quand le danger menace nouvelle que vous,
nous sommes prêts,
Nous sommes résolument aux côtés de cœur et de volonté.
Là, il est fort et fier, main dans la main,
Les habitants de la terre Luxembourg.

IV
Donc, il ne sera jamais un front uni,
confiance dans la joie et le malheur.
Donc, il ne sera jamais un front uni,
heureusement accomplir son devoir pour le trône et le pays.
Un coffre fort sur sol antique
et deux fois digne,
la hausse son sommet forte librement vers le soleil.
O Seigneur Dieu, protège et guide, main dans la main,
Les habitants de la terre Luxembourg!

== See also ==
- "Ons Heemecht", the national anthem of Luxembourg
- "Het Wilhelmus", the national anthem of the Netherlands
