= Luxembourg Military Band =

Military band of Luxembourg

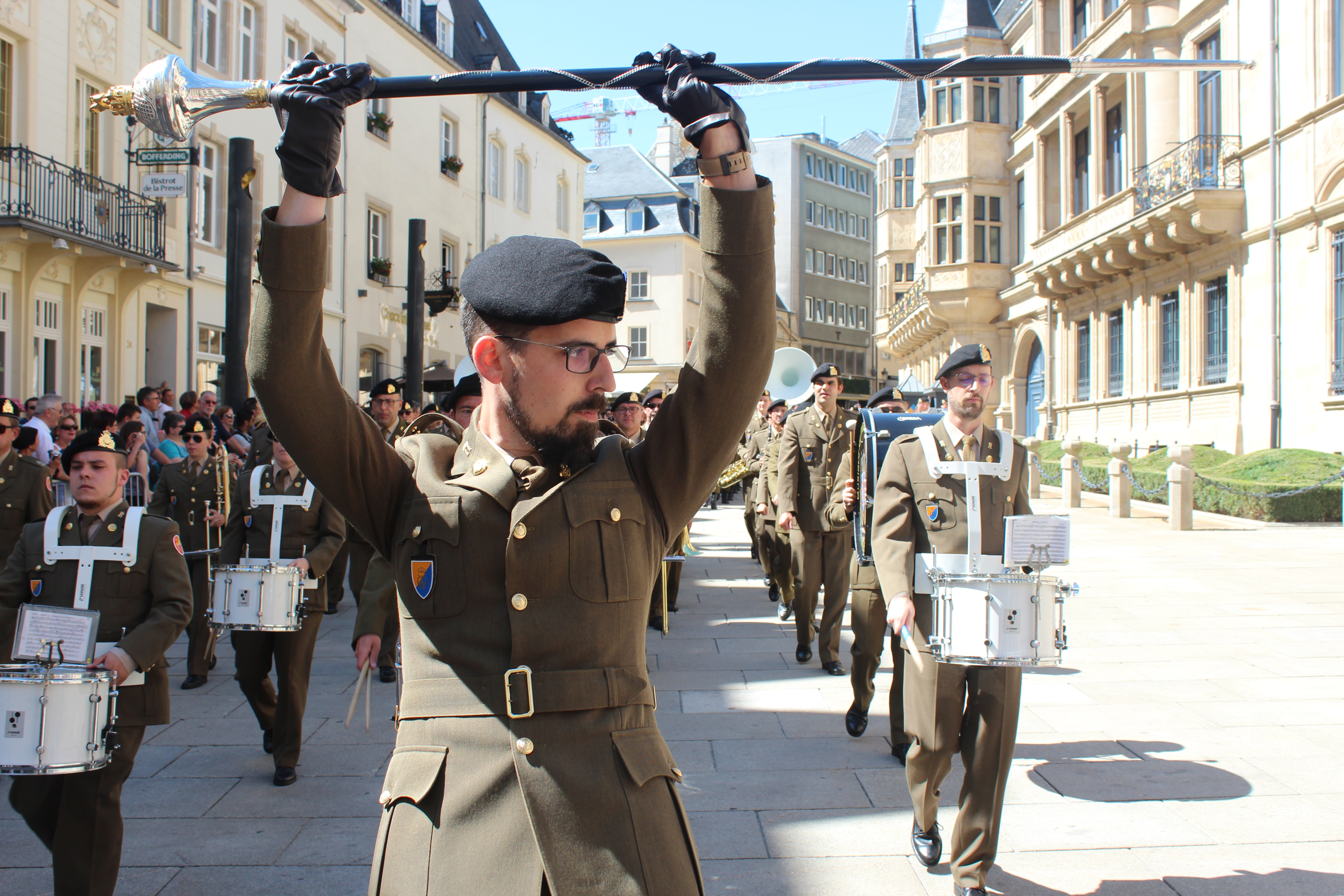
The Luxembourg Military Band, 2017

The Luxembourg Military Band, known locally as the Musique militaire grand-ducale (English: Grand Ducal Military Band), was founded in 1842 and has been a major contributor to Luxembourg's musical heritage. In addition to official performances for the Grand-Duke, the national government and the Luxembourg Army, the band frequently gives concerts in and around Luxembourg City.

== History ==
In 1815, when the Grand-Duchy of Luxembourg was created by the Vienna Congress, the need began to emerge for a national army. As a result of political difficulties, it was not, however, until 1842 that two infantry battalions finally came into being. The 1st Battalion, stationed in the abbey city of Echternach founded the country's first military band under the leadership of Franz Ferdinand Hoebich on 29 December 1842. Initially some 25 musicians were involved but the band grew from year to year. The 2nd battalion, garrisoned in Diekirch, was founded on 6 December 1847 under the leadership of Jean-Antoine Zinnen who is remembered for composing the music for the Luxembourg national anthem. Since June 1868 when the 2nd Battalion was disbanded, only the band of the 1st Battalion has remained. With some 60 musicians, it now takes the form of a big band. From 1986-2011, the bandmaster was Lieutenant-Colonel André Reichling. The band's official activities consist of performances for the grand-ducal court and for the national government on the occasion of state visits and receptions. Its military activities include playing at parades at the grand-ducal palace and for the changing of the guard.

== Public performances ==
The big band gives some 50 public concerts a year, mainly in locations inside Luxembourg itself but occasionally abroad. The members of the band are professional musicians, most of whom have studied at conservatories or universities abroad. While they are soldiers, apart from basic training they have no military duties. The band's extensive repertoire stretches from military music and marches for brass bands to a large number of pieces from which selections can be made on an à la carte basis to satisfy the particular wishes of the audience for whom they are to be performed. The band also splits up into various formations such as chamber orchestra, brass band, instrumental ensemble, wind quintet, clarinet quartet, saxophone quintet, Dixie groups or bugles and drums. Together these groups give over 200 performances per year and take part in some 150 rehearsals. The home of the Military Band is Luxembourg's Conservatory where they frequently perform in the main auditorium. Ernie Hammes has been a member of the band since 1987 and since 1994 he has been the leader and first trumpet in the Big Band.
