= Alexander Mullenbach =

Luxembourgish pianist, composer and conductor

Dr. h.c. Alexander Müllenbach
- Also known as: Alexander Mullenbach
- Born: 23 January 1949 (age 77); Luxembourg City
- Education: Conservatoire de Luxembourg; Conservatoire de Paris; Mozarteum Salzburg
- Genres: Contemporary classical
- Occupations: pianist, composer and conductor
- Instrument: piano
- Publishers: Doblinger Edition, Vienna; Norsk Musikforlag, Oslo; Luxembourg Music Publishers, Luxembourg
- Awards: 1980: Erster Kompositionspreis des ORF Salzburg; 1981: Bernhard Paumgartner-Medaille; 1985: Großer Lions-Preis des Herzogtum Luxemburg; 1999: Order of Merit of the Grand Duchy of Luxembourg (officer)

Alexander Mullenbach (born 1949) is a Luxembourgish pianist, composer and conductor. Since 2002, he has been director of the International Summer Academy at the Salzburg in Salzburg.

== Career ==
Born in Luxembourg City on 23 January 1949, Mullenbach studied piano, chamber music and composition at the Conservatoire de Paris and at the Salzburg Mozarteum, where his teachers included Gerhard Wimberger and Cesar Bresgen. From 1970, he taught piano at the Conservatoire de Luxembourg and, from 1981, composition. Since then, he has also taught at the Mozarteum. Since 1978, he has composed over 100 works, of which thirteen for symphony orchestra, as well as an opera. They have been performed at major music festivals in Salzburg, Echternach, Strasbourg, St.Petersburg, London, Vienna and Munich. Performers have included Heinrich Schiff, Boris Pergamenschikow, Marjana Lipovšek, Roberto Fabbriciani, Julius Berger, Alois Brandhofer, Irena Grafenauer, Elliot Fisk, Kurt Widmer, Edoardo Catemario, Tsuyoshi Tsutsumi, Christina Ortiz, Ruggiero Ricci, Roberto Szidon, Edda Silvestri, Gottfried Schneider, Lewis Kaplan, Yair Kless, Frank Wibaut, Antonello Farulli, Frederico Mondelci, Maria Christina Kiehr, Yoko Amoyal, Elena Denisova, Velislava Georgieva, Françoise Groben, Michael Vaiman, Frank Stadler, Iride Martinez, and the ensembles Wiener Streichsextett, Hagen Quartett, Atlas Quartett, Stadler Quartett, Camerata Salzburg, Musica Viva Dresden, Alter Ego Rome, Atelier Musique Nouvelle de Paris, Klangforum Wien, Österreichisches Ensemble für Neue Musik, Wiener Kammerorchester, Philharmonische Virtuosen Berlin, Parnassus Ensemble London, Mozarteum Quartett Salzburg, Vilnius-Quartett, Pierrot Lunaire Ensemble Vienna, Mozarteum Orchester Salzburg; Orchestre Philharmonique du Luxembourg, Rheinische Philharmonie Koblenz, Orchestre de Chambre du Luxembourg "Les Musiciens", Kammerakademie Neuss/Rhein. Conductors who have directed his symphonic works include Ernest Bour, Leopold Hager, Hans Graf and Udo Zimmermann, David Shallon, Stanislaw Skrowaczewski, Philippe Entremont, Hubert Soudant, Hans Graf, Günter Neuhold, Antoni Wit, Emmanuel Krivine, Daniel Raiskin, Jari Hämälainen, Jaap Schroeder, Pierre Cao, Johannes Kalitzke, Marc Soustrot, Sylvain Cambreling.

He was the founder and chairman of the Luxembourg New Music Society LGNM (1983–94). He was president of the Luxembourg National Music Council (2000 to 2007), director of the International Summer Academy of Mozarteum Salzburg (2002-2013), artistic director of Echternach Festival (2007-2013). He is a co-founder and vice-chairman of Luxembourg Music Publishers (LMP). In 2015, he received the title of Doctor Honoris Causa from University of Music “Academie Gheorghe Dima” Cluj in Romania.

== Memberships and affiliations ==
- 1997: member of the Academia Scientiarum et Artium Europaea in Salzburg and of the Grand Ducal Institute in Luxembourg.
- 1999: officer of the Order of Adolphe of Nassau, Grand Duchy of Luxembourg
- 2000: president of the Conseil Supérieur de la Musique in Luxembourg
- 2002: director of the Mozarteum International Summer Academy in Salzburg.
- 2007: artistic director of the Festival International Echternach, Luxembourg
- 2013: Founder and Vice-Chairman of Luxembourg Music Publishers
- 2015: Doctor Honoris Causa of the Gheorghe Dima Music Academy in Cluj-Napoca, Romania

== Compositions ==
Among his most successful compositions are:

- 1965: Three Winter Pieces for Piano (completed 1975)
- 1974: Brixham 4 Songs for Mezzosopr. and Piano on Texts by Jean Krier (completed 1981)
- 1981: Correspondences for Fl, Clar, Vl, Vc and Piano
- 1982: Rituel for Trumpet, Vl and Perc.
- 1987: Art Gallery, for Violin solo (LMP)
- 1987: Night Music for Piano solo (NMF)
- 1987: Dream Music II for Fl, Clar, Vl, Vc, and Piano
- 1987: Karma I for 2 Pianos
- 1988: Lost Islands for Clar, Vl and Piano
- 1988: Enigma
- 1991: Under the Rainbow (11 pieces for young pianists)(DO)
- 1991: 3 Choral-Preludes for Organ
- 1991: Schattenraum, 4 Songs for Mezzo-soprano und 10 Instruments on poems by Peter Härtling
- 1991: Ritual for Trumpet in C, Violin and Percussion (LMP)
- 1992: Partita I for Violin solo (DO)
- 1992: Fluidum for Clar. and Piano (DO)
- 1992: Volutes, wind quintett (LMP)
- 1992: 2 Trakl-Lieder für Mittlere Stimme und Klavier (LMP)
- 1994: Capriccio per Niccolò Paganini, per Violino solo (DO)
- 1994: Streams for Vl, Double-Bass and Piano
- 1995: Concerto for Violoncello and String Orchestra
- 1996: 4 Miniatures for Flute and Piano
- 1997: String Quartet I (Constructions in Metal) (LMP)
- 1997: An die Königin der Nacht, for Orchestra
- 1998: Tombeau for Organ
- 1998: 2 Songs on poems by Georg Trakl, for Medium Voice and Piano
- 1999: Piano Quintet (Piano, 2Vl, Vla, Vc)(DO)
- 1999: Dark Crystal, for Orchestra
- 2000: 5 Songs on poems by G. Ungaretti, for High voice and Piano
- 2000: Fluidum for Sax.sopr. and Piano
- 2000: Fluidum for Sax. alto and Piano
- 2001: In den Wänden des Windes, for Mezzo-Soprano and String Quartet on poems by Brecht, Fleming and Marti
- 2002: Aimez-vous...Brahms? for Violin solo (LMP)
- 2002: Zeit - Schatten (Quartett auf das Ende vom Lied) for Clar, Vl, Vc and Piano
- 2002: Gesang des Schwarzen Vogels (Song of the Black Bird) for Clar. solo (LMP)
- 2002: Mansfeld - Gloire et décadence
- 2003: Die Todesbrücke (The Bridge of Death) opera in 2 acts on a libretto by Dzevad Karahasan
- 2004: Country Music for Violin and Marimba (NMF)
- 2005: Conversations intimes for Violin and Double Bass
- 2005: 3 Songs on poems by Claudia Storz, for Baritone and Guitar
- 2006: String Quartet II
- 2006: Partita II for Vcello solo
- 2009: Das Haus am Watt, on a poem by Jean Krier, for Mezzo-Soprano, Clar. and Piano (LMP)
- 2009: Concerto for Marimba and String Orchestra (NMF)
- 2009: La mer, au loin..., for bass clar. and piano (LMP)
- 2010: Evocations héroïques - A la mémoire de Jean l'Aveugle (OCL)
- 2011: Kein Tier weiss um seinen Tod, on a poem by Claudia Storz, for Sopr., Woodwind Quintet and Bass-Clar.
- 2011: Pastorale for piano 4 hands
- 2011: Partita III for Viola solo
- 2012: In den Wind gesungen for oboe solo (LMP)
- 2012: Concerto for Organ and String Orchestra
- 2013: Aura - Salve Regina de Pontigny, for Vcello solo and 16 voices a capella
- 2014: 4 Sketches for Horn in F and Piano (LMP)
- 2016: Concerto for Violin and String orchestra

The works by Alexander Müllenbach are published by Doblinger Edition, Vienna (Do), by Norsk Musikforlag, Oslo (NMF), and by Luxembourg Music Publishers (LMP).

Several CD publications, among them: Alexander Müllenbach – Wie Haar, das über Steine rinnt und andere Kammermusik (5 450482 001265) CNA Dudelange-Luxembourg © by United Instruments of Lucilin
