= Sandrine Cantoreggi =

French violinist (born 1969)

Sandrine Marie Adèle Cantoreggi (born 1969) is a Luxembourg violinist who has gained an international reputation, performing both at home and abroad as a soloist with orchestras and in recitals. She also teaches the violin at the Conservatoire de Luxembourg. Cantoreggi acquired Luxembourg nationality in February 2005.

== Biography ==
Born on 29 May 1969 in Bègles, near Bordeaux, France, Sandrine Cantoreggi was educated at the Luxembourg Conservatoire. After studying with French violinist Pierre Amoyal in Paris and with Roman Nodel in Germany, she became the last person to study under the Belgian violinist, Carlo Van Neste. Cantoreggi completed her studies at the Queen Elisabeth Music Chapel in Belgium.

She has performed in concert halls across Europe including the Laeiszhalle in Hamburg, the Gewandhaus in Leipzig, the Rudolfinum in Prague, La Monnaie in Brussels, and the Salle Gaveau and Musée d’Orsay in Paris. She has played under the direction of many international conductors including Yehudi Menuhin, Vladimir Spivakov, Grzegorz Nowak and Pierre Cao.

== Discography ==
- Pietro Antonio Locatelli, "3 concertos et 6 caprices extraits de l'Arte del Violino, Turtle Records, SACD-HYBRID.
- Eugène Ysaÿe, "Oeuvre pour violon et piano", Turtle Records, SACD-HYBRID.
