= Ivan Boumans =

Luxembourgish composer

Ivan Boumans, born in November 1983 in Madrid, Spain, is a Spanish/Luxembourgish musician, composer, conductor and teacher.

== Life and studies ==
Born in Madrid in 1983, he begins his music studies (piano & clarinet) at the Conservatory of Cuenca, a city in central Spain. In 1998, he moves to Luxembourg, country of his father. He immediately enrols the Conservatoire de Luxembourg, expanding his music interests. It is there where (among piano, organ, music history, chamber music and many other subjects…) he discovers his interest in music theory. His studies in Luxembourg will lead him to be accepted in the Conservatoire National Supérieur de Musique et de Danse de Paris (CNSMDP) following the harmony, fugue, counterpoint, XXth century music writing, orchestration, analysis & conducting classes. His studies in Paris have been rewarded with a final Master Diploma on Music Writing in June 2011.

== Compositions ==
The positive Luxembourgish music environment has allowed him to work as free-lance composer since 1999. His catalogue of works contains more than 150 pieces of several music styles going from chamber music works, film music or symphonic pieces. His works have been performed all through Europe, USA, China and Russia, by ensembles like the Luxembourg Philharmonic Orchestra or the Orchestre National de France, among others.

== Other activities ==
He currently teaches in the Music Theory Department of the Music Conservatory of Luxembourg, activity that he combines with other composition & conducting projects as a Freelancer.

== Awards ==
He has received a "Composer Award" by the International Classical Music Awards in January 2020.
