= Mariette Kemmer =

Luxembourgish soprano singer (born 1953)

Mariette Kemmer (born 1953) is a Luxembourgish soprano singer who has performed in concerts and operas throughout Europe and in the United States. She also teaches at the Conservatoire in Esch-sur-Alzette.

== Early life and education ==
Daughter of the pianist Jean-Pierre Kemmer, Mariette was born in Luxembourg City on 29 November 1953. From the age of 9, she studied the cello at the Conservatoire de Luxembourg before turning to singing when she was 13. After leaving school, she spent three years at the Opéra Studio school in Brussels, then completed her studies at the Musikhochschule Rheinland in Düsseldorf. While in Brussels, she first sang secondary parts in operas at La Monnaie, before taking on her first main roles in Der Rosenkavalier (Sophie), The Magic Flute (Pamina) and Carmen (Micaëla) at the age of 24.

== Career ==
Over the years, Mariette Kemmer has sung in virtually all the grand concert halls and opera houses of Europe. Worldwide, she has performed in some 900 operatic performances but, surprisingly, has only appeared in three in her native Luxembourg. After her debut at La Monnaie, she rapidly embarked on her international career singing in recitals and operas at Copenhagen, Las Palmas, San Francisco and Prague. She has now performed in over 100 cities, in 70 opera houses with about a hundred different orchestras. Among her prestigious venues are the opera houses of Vienna, Munich, Berlin, Hamburg, Dresden, Frankfurt, Zurich, Geneva and Verona and concert halls such as the Beethovenhalle (Bonn), Konzerthaus (Vienna), Salle Pleyel (Paris) and the Rudolfinum (Prague). Since 2003, she has taught at the Conservatoire d'Esch-sur-Alzette in the south of Luxembourg.

== Discography ==
- 2003: "Joseph Jongen: Melodies with orchestra", Mariette Kemmer soprano, Orchestre Philharmonique de Monte-Carlo, Pierre Bartholomée conductor, Cypres CD CYP1635
- 2000: "Arthur Honegger: Sémiramis", Orchestre symphonique de RTL, Dirigent: Leopold Hager, CD Timpani, 2000
- 1996: "Metz Opéra-Théatre-Arias", Rossini; Mozart; Berlioz; Gluck; Gounod, Gilles Ragon (Tenor); Mariette Kemmer (Soprano); Nicolas Cavallier (Bass); Claire Brua (Soprano), Lorraine Philharmonic Orchestra, Discovery Records Ltd
