= Michel Reis =

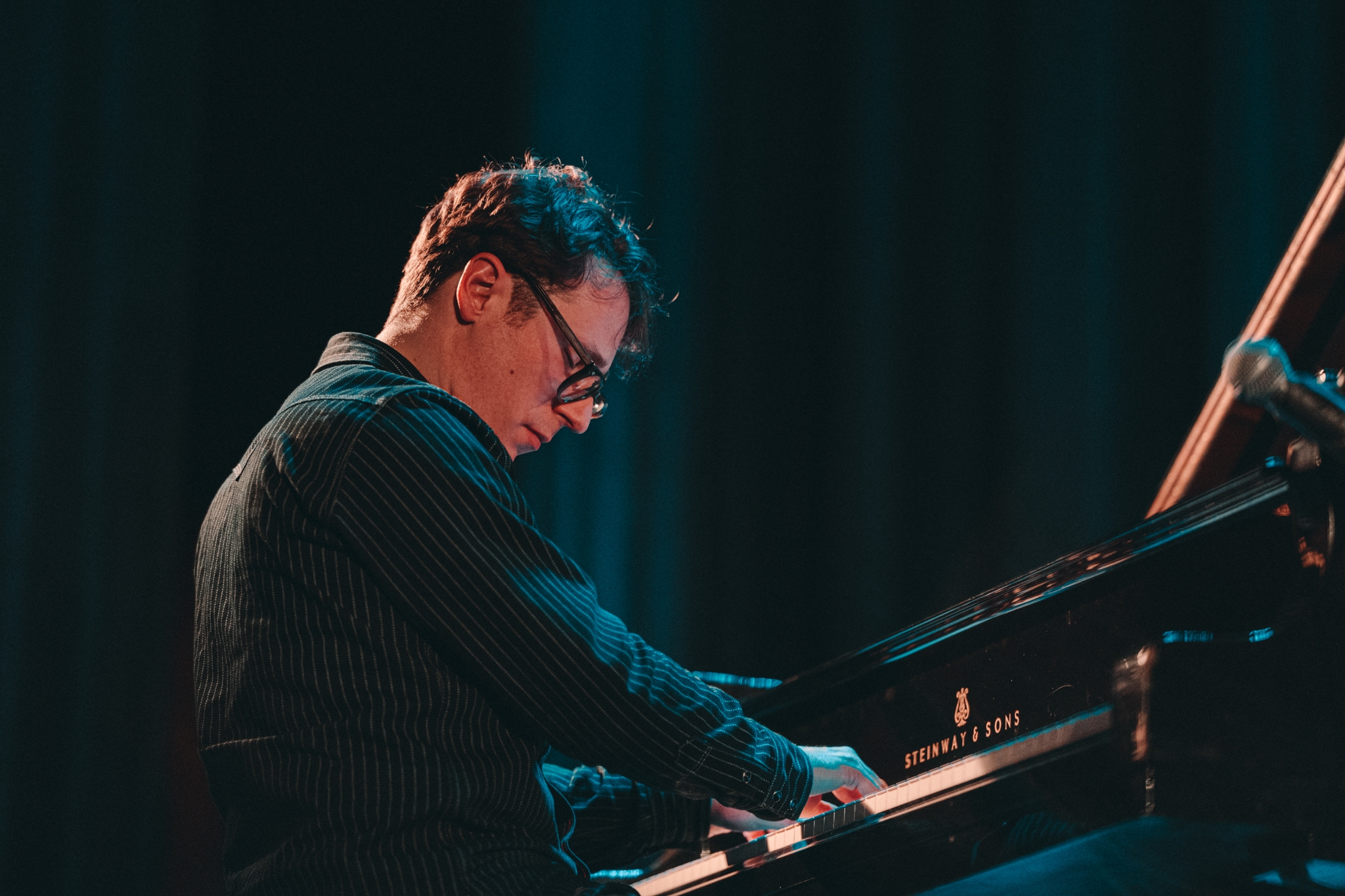
- Reis in 2024, Bucharest, Romania

Background information
- Born: September 11, 1982 (age 43); Luxembourg City
- Genres: Jazz, instrumental, free improvisation
- Occupations: Musician, composer
- Instrument: Piano
- Years active: 2004–present
- Label: CAM Jazz
- Website: michelreis.com

Michel Reis (born 11 September 1982) is a Luxembourgish jazz pianist and composer who has performed internationally both individually and with other bands.

== Biography ==
Born in Luxembourg City, Reis began to play the piano when he was 8. When he started improvising and composing in his early teens, his father enrolled him in the jazz department at the Luxembourg Conservatory where he studied harmony, composition, improvisation and ensemble.

To further his musical training, Reis moved to Boston, MA to study at Berklee College of Music and the New England Conservatory of Music, obtaining first a BM and then a MM in jazz piano and composition. During his training in Boston, Reis studied, worked and performed with Joe Lovano, Danilo Perez, Dave Holland, George Garzone, Ran Blake, Frank Carlberg, Esperanza Spalding, Hal Crook and Greg Hopkins. In 2010, Reis participated in the ASCAP Foundation Workshop in Memory of Buddy Baker, led by film composers Bruce Broughton, Mark Snow, Ira Newborn and David Spear, with whom he has remained a part-time student.

Michel Reis has performed internationally in many of the world’s most famous venues and festivals, including the Blue Note Jazz Club, Dizzy’s Club Coca-Cola at Jazz at Lincoln Center, the Olympia in Paris, the Casa de Musica in Porto, the 55 Bar, the Knitting Factory, the Panama Jazz Festival the Montreux Jazz Festival, Cully Jazz, Crest Jazz Vocal, OctLoft Jazz Festival, Les Rendez-Vous de l’Erdre de Nantes and many more.

In 2005, Reis was a finalist in the First Moscow Competition for Jazz Performers. A year later, he took second prize at the Montreux Jazz Solo Piano Competition.

Since 2017, he has composed jingles for the station announcements on the Luxembourg City tramway.

== Awards ==
- 2005: Finalist, First Moscow Competition for Jazz Performers (Piano)
- 2006: Second prize, Montreux Jazz Competition
- 2013: Export Artist of the Year award with Reis Demuth Wiltgen Trio by the Luxembourgish export office music:LX
- 2014: Export Artist of the Year award by the Luxembourgish export of office music:LX
- 2018: Export Artist of the Year award by the Luxembourgish export of office music:LX

== Discography as a leader ==
- A Young Mind (2006)
- Fairytale (2009)
- Point of No Return (2010)
- Hidden Meaning (2012)
- Capturing This Moment (2015)
- Mito (2018)
- Japan Quartet (2018)
- Short Stories (2019)
- For A Better Tomorrow (2023)

== Discography with Reis Demuth Wiltgen ==
- Reis-Demuth-Wiltgen (2013)
- Places In Between (2016)
- Once In a Blue Moon (2018)
- Sly (2021)
- Freedom Trail (2026)

== With Pilz Reis Dahm Martiny ==
- Mayhem (2024)
