= Lou Koster =

Luxembourgish composer and pianist

Lou Koster

Lou Koster (7 May 1889 – 17 November 1973) was a Luxembourgish composer and pianist. Specializing in violin and piano, she studied at the Luxembourg Conservatory until 1906, then taught there from 1908. While still young, she began to compose. Her first success was her one-act operetta An der Schemm (At the Baths), composed in 1922. From 1933, many of her orchestral works, especially her waltzes and marches, were played for radio by the RTL Grand Symphony Orchestra. Her greatest success was however the choral ballad Der Geiger von Echternach (The Echternach Fiddler) which she completed when she was 83. It was premiered in the Abbey of Echternach in July 1972 to great acclaim.

== Early life and education ==
Born on 7 May 1889 in Luxembourg City, Louise Koster was the daughter of the railway official Jean Koster (1852–1919) and Emma Hoebich (1865–1950). Her maternal grandfather, Franz Ferdinand Bernhard Hoebich (1813–1900), who was born in Silesia, was the conductor of the military band in Echternach from 1842. He later directed the music corps at the grand-ducal court. After retiring in 1878 and becoming a widower in 1882, Hoebich became the music teacher of Lou and her sister Lina (1891–1938). Lou had two other siblings, Fernand (1902–1981) and Laure (1902–1999).

It was her grandfather who taught Lou Koster not only to play both the violin and the piano but also elementary music theory. At a time when girls in Luxembourg could only study music privately, Koster proved to be a gifted student. Shortly before his death, her grandfather gave her his violin, a masterpiece created by the Austrian Jacob Stainer (c.1618–1683). After her grandfather died in March 1900, her mother continued her music education until she was 15, when she was sent to spend two years with her aunt Anna Hoebich in Paris so that she could learn to speak French.

It was only in 1906, when she was 17, that Koster was able to attend the newly opened Luxembourg Conservatory, where she was able to continue her violin and piano studies, primarily under Joseph Keyseler (1879–1953) and Marie Kühn-Fontenelle (1875–1952). She apparently also learnt composition under the Belgian composer Fernand Mertens (1827–1957).

== Career ==
The Koster daughters began to earn their living from music at an early age, even before the First World War. They accompanied silent films on Sundays and holidays, playing the violin (Lou) and the cello (Lina and occasionally Laura) and performed in the capital's concert cafés. From 1908, Lou Koster worked as a piano and violin tutor at the conservatory. Although this work was not well paid, she remained an auxiliary teacher for 13 years before she was officially appointed a piano teacher. She continued to be employed as a conservatory teacher until 1954. She also played in the conservatory's orchestra although there are no records of her own compositions having been played.

As a composer, she began to write songs and light music for the piano. She went on to compose waltzes, marches and other dances, publishing 14 selected pieces in Germany and Belgium. In 1922, she composed her one-act operetta An der Schwemm (At the Baths) with a libretto by the Luxembourger Batty Weber (1860–1940). It was performed in the Pole Nord, a venue in Luxembourg City, where it was well received. In the 1920s, she also wrote some 20 light orchestral pieces for her own ensemble. They were performed in connection with competitions at the Swimming Club Luxembourg. In July 1922, her specially composed "Swimming March" was performed for the Swimming Club.

From 1933, Koster's orchestral works were performed ever more frequently by Radio Luxembourg's symphony orchestra. In connection with the centenary celebrations for Luxembourg's independence in 1939, her marches "La Joyeuse" and "Keep Smiling" were performed, as well as a fantasy from her An der Schwemm.

Her works were not performed during the German occupation of Luxembourg during the Second World War as they were deemed to be too French. After the war, she had difficulty in re-establishing herself. As a result, she turned from light music to more serious vocal compositions. On 22 November 1959, a concert arranged by the City of Luxembourg to present her vocal works was well received. This encouraged Koster to create Ons Lidd (Our Song), an ensemble she frequently accompanied on the piano and which increasingly performed her own compositions.

Her final, longest and most important work, Der Geiger von Echternach (The Echternach Fiddler), was a choral ballad adapted from a text by the Luxembourg writer Nik Welter. It was performed in the Abbey of Echternach by the RTL Orchestra and the Chorale Municipale of Esch-sur-Alzette on 9 July 1972. It proved to be a tremendous success.

Lou Koster died the following year, on 17 November 1973, in Luxembourg City.
