= Walter Civitareale =

Luxembourgish pianist and composer

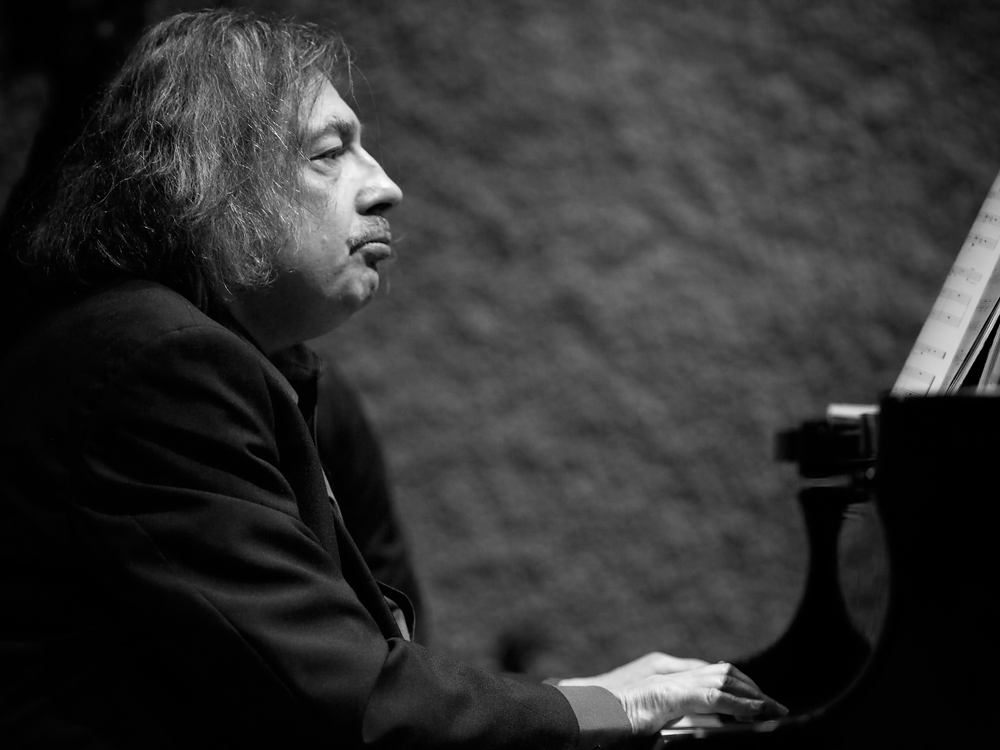

Background information
- Born: August 2, 1954 (age 70); Differdange, Differdange, Luxembourg
- Genres: Classical
- Occupations: Pianist; Composer
- Instrument: Piano

Walter Civitareale (born 2 August 1954) is a Luxembourgish pianist and composer. He is a professor of piano at the Conservatoire de la Ville de Luxembourg. He performed in the 2005 concert commemorating the 60th anniversary of the liberation of Luxembourg.

== Works ==
- Oratorio pour les exclus, homage to Abbé Pierre
- 3 Bagatelles
- Concerto pour violoncelle et orchestre
- Elegie und Liebeslied
- Concert pour violoncelle et orchestre, homage to René Mertzig
- Concerto Humoristique
