= Claude Lenners =

Luxembourgish composer (born 1956)

Claude Lenners (born 1956) is a Luxembourgish composer of mainly chamber and vocal works. In 1999, he founded Pyramide, an association for electronic music. Since 2004, he has headed its successor, Institut de recherche musicale.

== Biography ==
Born on 11 May 1956 in Luxembourg City, Lenners specialized in computer science before deciding to return to music when he was 23. He studied music and musicology with Alexander Mullenbach at the Luxembourg Conservatory and with François-Bernard Mâche in Strasbourg.

He has composed for a number of ensembles including Alter Ego, Asko Ensemble, Cambridge New Music Players, Court-circuit, Ensemble Accroche Note, Ensemble 13 and Ensemble Intercontemporain. His compositions have also been played by the Luxembourg Philharmonic Orchestra and the Saarbrücken Radio Symphony Orchestra. Soloists who have performed his works include violinist Irvine Arditti, percussionist Guy Frisch, saxophonists Pierre-Stéphane Meugé and Olivier Sliepen, pianists Oscar Pizzo and Béatrice Rauchs and flautist Manuel Zurria.

== Awards ==
- Scholarship to study composition at the Villa Medici in Rome (1989–91)
- First Prize, Henri Dutilleux Composers Competition (1991)
- First International Irino Prize for Chamber Music (Tokyo, 1993)
- Lions Prize (Luxembourg section, 1997)

== Selected works ==
- Der Turm (2011)
- In a Wilderness of Mirrors (2007)
- Odyssey Reloaded (2007)
- HoMo XeRoX (2006)
- Wild Card for Orchestra and Embedded Violin (2005)
- Dream Museum (1998)
- Night Mail (1998)
- Buch der Unruhe (1997)
- Quaderno Romano (1996)
- Klanglied (1995)
- Tête à tête (1993)
- Durch kühle Nacht (1989)
- Songs between Starlight and Earth-Night (1987)
- Pentagramma (1985)
- Brush and Trunks (1985)
- Les insectes (1984)
- Quatuor à cordes sériel (1982)
- Sonata facile (1982)
- Trio (1981)

== Discography ==
- "Beyond", Apollo pour violon solo – Pan pour flûte solo – Alba pour piano solo – Tête-à-Tête pour violon et flûte – Codex Latinus pour flûte et piano – 3rd dream pour violon et piano – Half-Moon/Fragments trio pour violon, flûte et piano. Irvine Arditti (violon). Ensemble Alter Ego (Manuel Zurria, flute – Oscar Pizzo, piano). CD Stradivarius STRAD33613
