= Michel Lentz =

Luxembourgish poet (1820–1893)

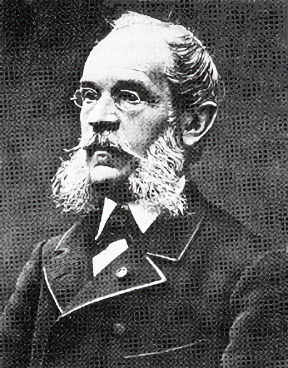
- Michel Lentz in 1893
- Born: 21 May 1820; Luxembourg City
- Died: 7 September 1893; Luxembourg City
- Education: Athénée de Luxembourg
- Occupations: poet; writer
- Writing career
- Genres: hymn
- Notable work: Ons Heemecht

Michel Lentz (21 May 1820 – 7 September 1893) was a Luxembourgish poet. He is best known for having written Ons Heemecht, the national anthem of Luxembourg. He was a civil servant by profession.

== Life ==
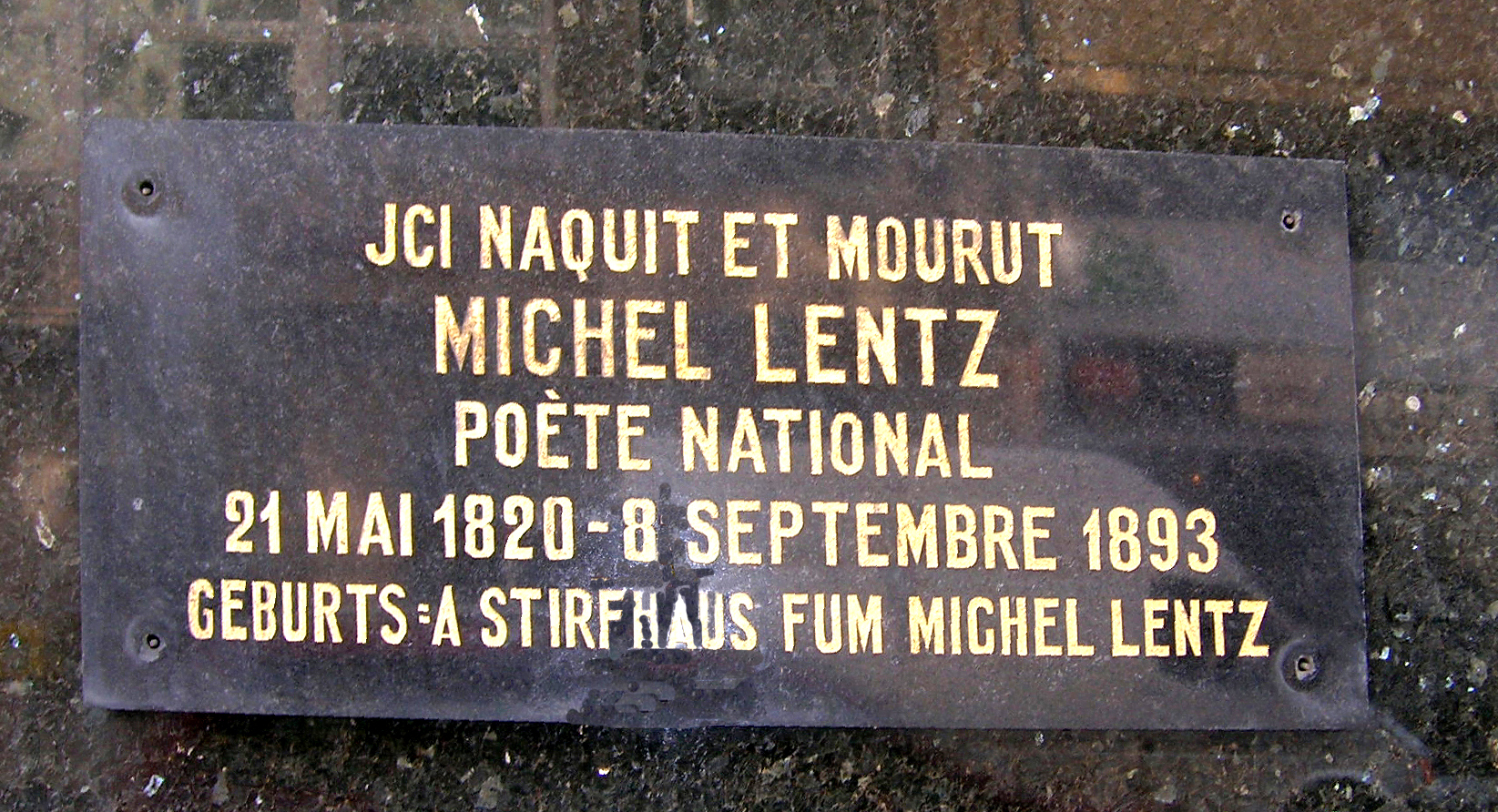
Memorial plaque on Rue Notre-Dame, commemorating Michel Lentz

Michel Lentz, the son of master baker Jean-Pierre Lentz and his wife Marguerite Spresser, was born on Rue Chimay on 21 May 1820. Around 1820, his father bought the house on the corner of Rue Chimay and Rue Notre-Dame. Shortly afterwards, he bought a small house on Rue Notre-Dame to run his bakery.

After primary school, Lentz went to the Athénée de Luxembourg, where he received his first diploma in 1840. After a year of studying philology at the Free University of Brussels, he was appointed to the government secretariat at the end of 1842. On 10 September 1851, when Lentz was already a first-class clerk, he married Jeanne Reuter, the daughter of a retired schoolteacher. They had three children.

As a writer, Lentz published satirical and patriotic poems and songs, among other things. Luxembourg's national motto, "Mir wëlle bleiwe wat mir sinn", is derived from De Feierwon, which he wrote in 1859 on the occasion of the inauguration of the city's railway, on 4 October. Lentz also wrote the lyrics for Ons Heemecht (1864), which became the official anthem of the Grand Duchy of Luxembourg in 1993. Many of his poems were published in the anthologies Spâss an Iérscht (1873) and Hierschtblummen (1887), in the newspaper Das Luxemburger Land.

By 1857, Michel Lentz was deputy head of the office, and from 1869 onwards, he was head of the office and advisor in the Court of Auditors of Luxembourg, a position he held until his retirement in 1892.

Lentz died at the age of 73 on 7 September 1893. He was given a state funeral at the Notre-Dame Cemetery, at which Prime Minister Paul Eyschen delivered a eulogy.

== Work ==
Lentz wrote his first poem at the age of 17. The first collection of his poems was published in 1873, under the title Spâss an Erscht. Fourteen years later, Hirschblummen was published. A third volume, named Wantergreng, was never printed. Many of his poems were set to music, partly by himself but also by other composers, including Jean Antoine Zinnen, Laurent Menager, J. A. Müller, Gustave Kahnt, and Albert Thorn.

== Tributes ==
After the death of writer and poet Edmond de la Fontaine, friends raised money to erect a monument to him. Shortly afterwards, a committee was formed in order to do the same for Lentz.

Since 1903, the Dicks-Lentz Monument stands in the Jan Palach Square section of the Place d'Armes in Luxembourg City. Lentz has also been depicted on Luxembourg postage stamps, euro coins, a bronze portrait relief, and a silver medal; a road in Luxembourg now bears his name as well.

=== Poems (selection) ===
- Miniminimo
- Zéng Froen
- Merenchen
- Wé méng Mamm nach hûet gesponnen
- De Be'fchen a sei Peiâss
- De Fresch an den Ochs
- Ons Heemecht
- Fidelitas
- Schuobermess
- An Amérika
- Mir si glëcklech
- D'Margréitchen
- Den Text vum Hämmelsmarsch
- Hemwe'
- De Feierwon
- Wât d'Hémécht as
- Beim Weier
- E schlèchte Witz
- Den Zeîtsgenoch
- Op der Léder
- Wîen ass dât Kand?
- Zwó Kaatzen

== Gallery ==
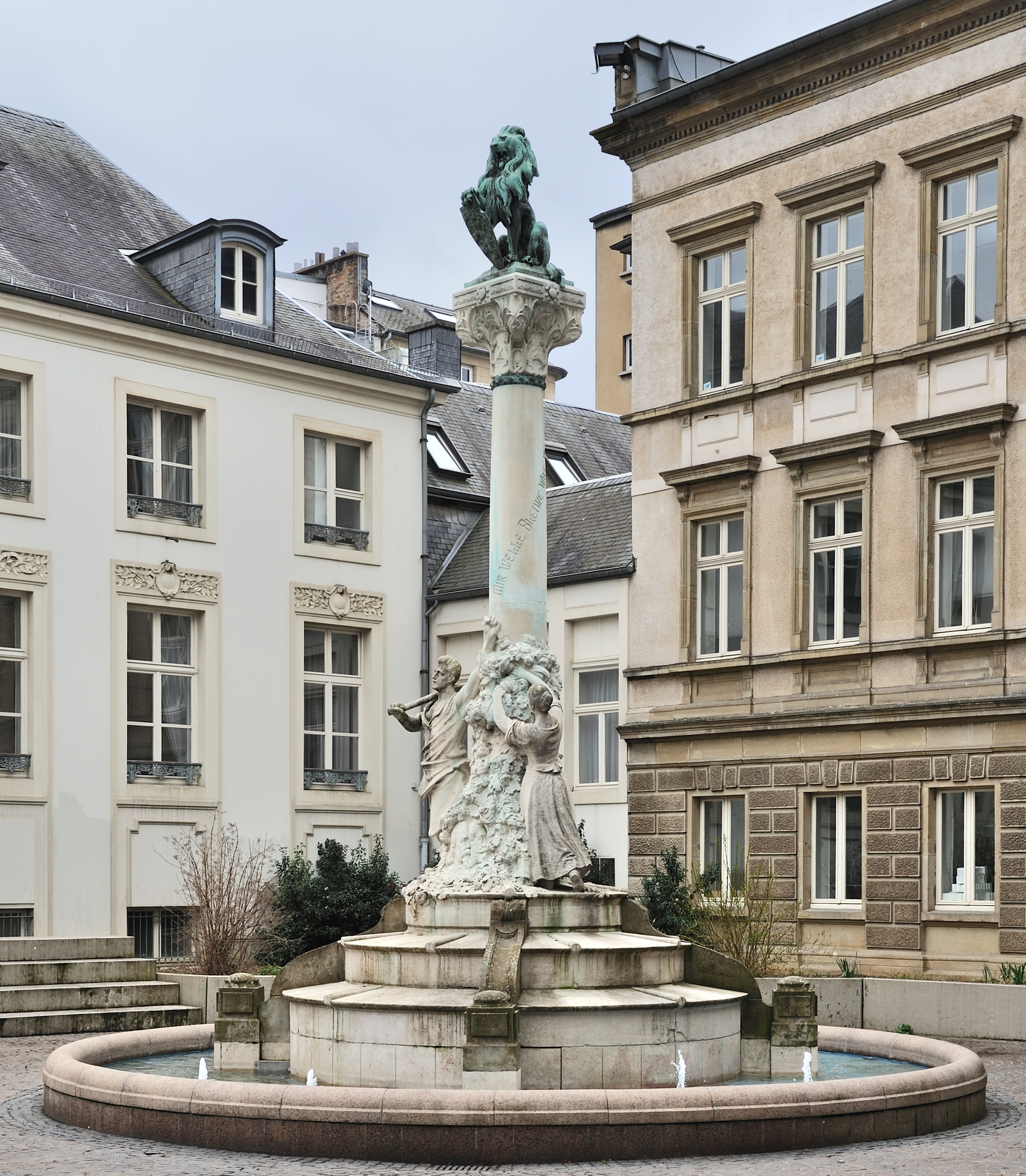
Dicks-Lentz Monument in Luxembourg City

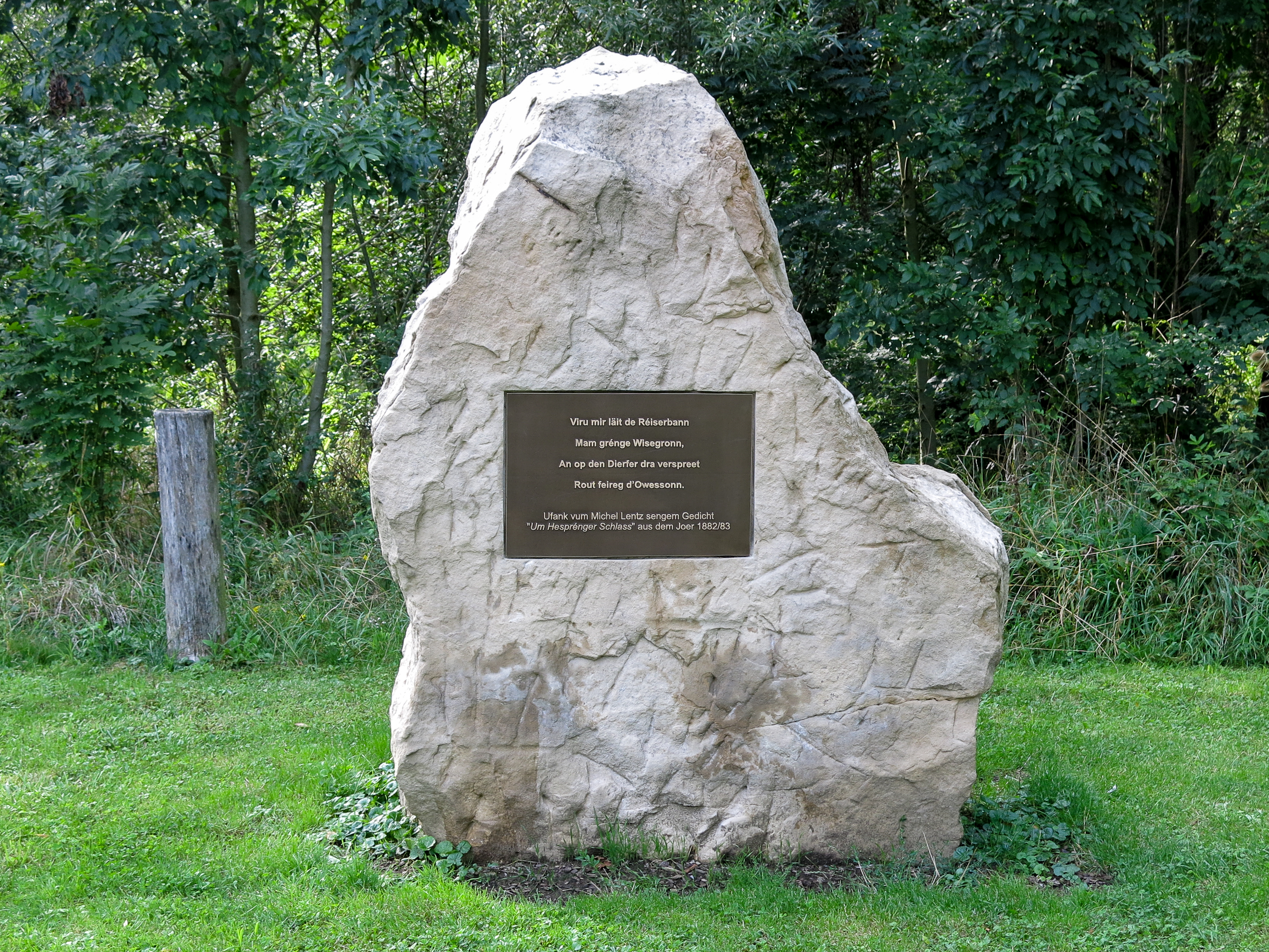
Monument Lentz in Hesper Park, Hesperange

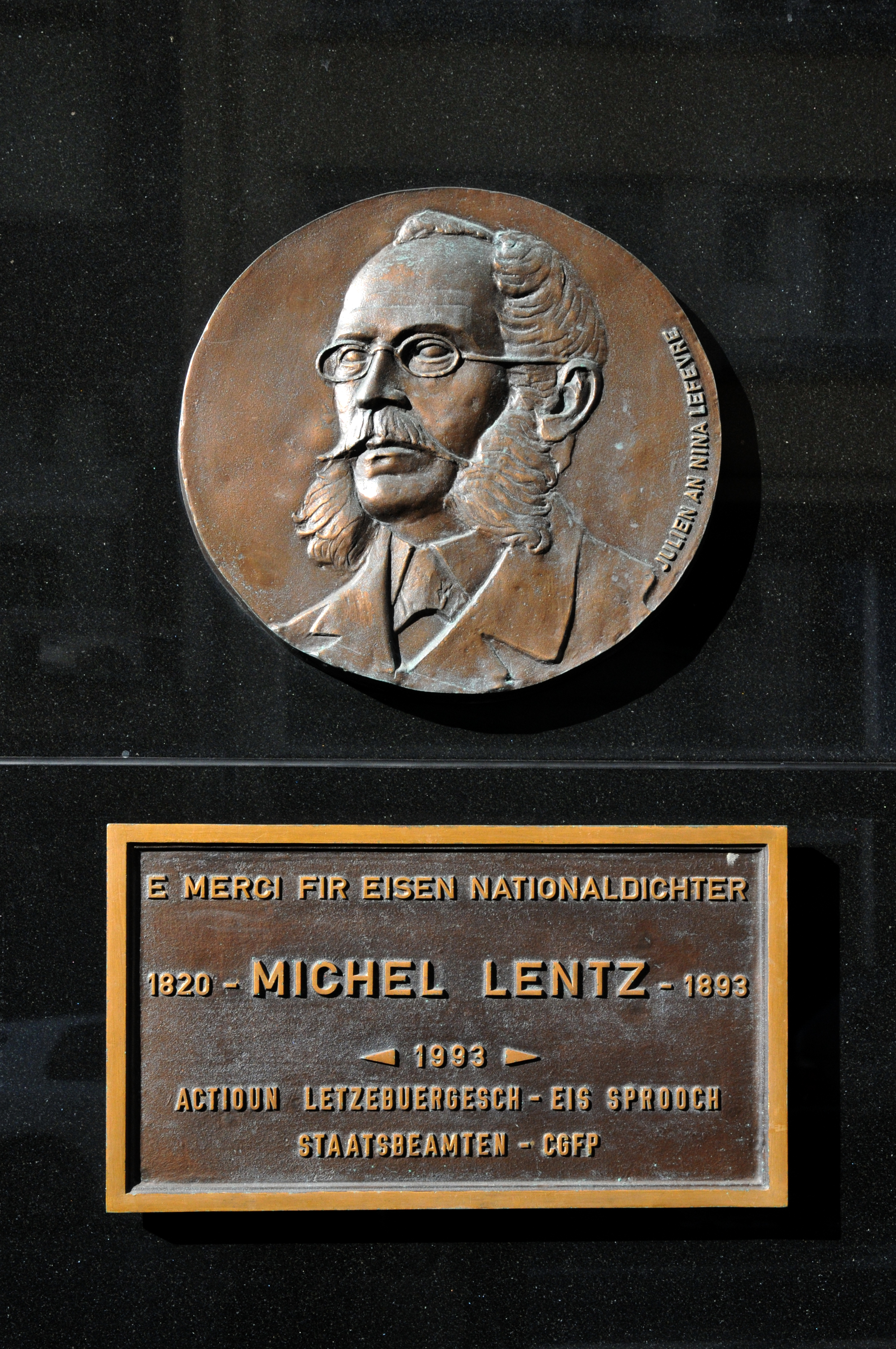
Plaque in Luxembourg City

== Bibliography ==
- Paul Dostert, 2003. Michel Lentz 1820–1893. In: 400 Joer Kolléisch, Volume II: 277–278. Saint Paul Editions, Luxembourg. ISBN 2-87963-419-9. (in Luxembourgish)
- Maugendre, Xavier (1996). L'Europe des hymnes dans leur contexte historique et musical [Europe's anthems in their historical and musical context] (in French). Sprimont, [Belgique]: Mardaga. pp. 66–68. ISBN 978-2-87009-632-1.

== See also ==
- List of Luxembourgian artists
