= Ernie Hammes =

Luxembourgian jazz trumpeter (born 1968)

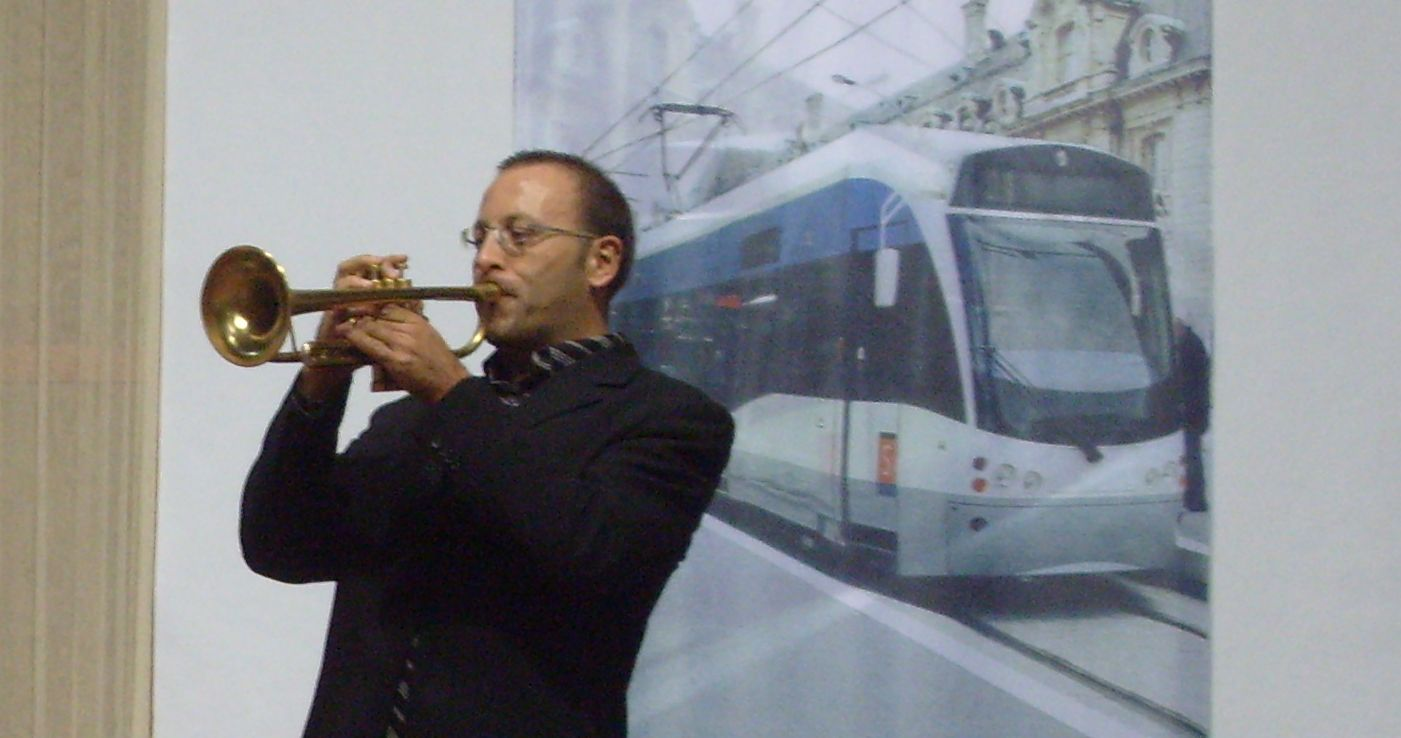
- Ernie Hammes at the opening of the Oeko-Foire at Lux-Expo

Background information
- Born: August 18, 1968 (age 57); Esch-sur-Alzette, Luxembourg
- Genres: Jazz
- Occupations: Musician, trumpeter, composer, big band director
- Instrument: Trumpet
- Website: www.erniehammes.com

Ernie Hammes (born 1968) is a Luxembourger trumpet virtuoso, arranger, composer, and big band director who is prolific in both jazz and classical idioms. Notably in jazz, Hammes toured with Maynard Ferguson's Big Bop Nouveau band in 2005, alternating between the lead and jazz roles. Hammes has performed in more than twenty-five countries while simultaneously supporting the jazz scene in Luxembourg.

== Biography ==
Hammes was born 18 August 1968 Esch-sur-Alzette, Luxembourg. He studied at the Conservatories of Esch-sur-Alzette and Metz (:fr:) and later at the Manhattan School of Music and the Berklee College of Music in Boston. Since 1997, Hammes has performed at Birdland and the Blue Note jazz clubs in New York, he has traveled widely to jazz venues and jazz festivals across Europe and North America. Recent performances have included festivals in Chicago, Calgary, Vancouver, Edmonton, New Orleans, Karlsbad (Czech Republic), and Cleveland, Ohio. Hammes has also played at Ronnie Scott's Jazz Club in London and at the Montreux, Den Haag, and Toronto festivals. The Duke Ellington Orchestra has flourished for over fifty-two years since the death of the Duke, himself. As of 2013, Hammes is the only European known to have been a member of the Duke Ellington Orchestra from any era.

In his native Luxembourg, Hammes is the founder (1993), director and lead trumpet in the Luxembourg Jazz Orchestra and, since 1987, has been a member of the Musique militaire grand-ducale (the Luxembourg Army Band) where he is lead trumpet and, since 1994, leader of the big band.

As for classical music, he has played with the BBC National Orchestra of Wales, the Luxembourg Philharmonic Orchestra and the Latvian Philharmonic Chamber Orchestra.

== Discography ==
Classical

1997: Festival, classical trumpet works with orchestra/organ
2006: Trumpet Classics, baroque and romantic works for trumpet/piccolo trumpet and organ as well as with brass quintet
2007: Suite from Freed & Feier, for the Luxembourg Army Concert Band, fireworks, Luxembourg National Day 2007
2010: Delux Trio; OCLC 829687360

Jazz

1996: Jazz Combos in Concert, Manhattan School of Music, December 2, 1996 OCLC 36444586
1997: Live at Montreux 1997, Manhattan School of Music Jazz Orchestra (Montreux Jazz Festival); OCLC 610937350
2000: Stepwise, with Bob Mintzer; OCLC 725452246
2001: Two Sides to Every Story, Derrick James, Jardis (G)20137
2005: Night Lights, Ernie Hammes, Live at the Inouï (L'inouï jazz club, Redange, Luxembourg); OCLC 774383132, 725155429
2006: Guided Dream, sv:Tolvan Big Band with David Liebman; OCLC 459057741, 29026111
2006: MF Horn VI – Live at Ronnie’s, Maynard Ferguson & Big Bop Nouveau, live recording at the Ronnie Scott's Jazz Club, London; OCLC 607863162
2007: Jazz: Made in Luxembourg, Hammes is composer of "New Capri;" OCLC 436977469

As sideman with Amina Figarova

2008: Above The Clouds; OCLC 298542210
2010: Sketches; OCLC 648940387
2012: Twelve; OCLC 785876686

== Videography ==
2007: Maynard Ferguson Tribute Concert, DVD, Vol. 1 of 2; OCLC 180193073
Recorded live, September 20, 2006, Touhill Performing Arts Center, University of Missouri–St. Louis
Personnel on Vol. 1 includes: Trumpets — Wayne Bergeron, Carl Fischer, Ernie Hammes, Stan Mark, Eric Miyashiro, Dennis Noday, Lew Soloff, Andrea Tofanelli, Walter White, Patrick Hession, Steve Schankman, Peter Olstad, Serafin Aguilar; saxes — Mike Dubaniewicz (alto), Matt Wallace (tenor), Denis DiBlasio (bari); trombones — Steve Wiest; piano — Christian Jacob, Chip Stevens, Jeff Lashway

2007: Youssou N'Dour – Return to Gorée: a Musical Odyssey, a story of slavery; OCLC 495202223, 488750568
