= Pronoian Made =

- Origin: Luxembourg
- Genres: Gothic rock, alternative rock
- Years active: 1996–2006
- Labels: Equinoxe, Azoth Arts, Leico Music
- Past members: Oliver Made; Neal Lisé; Joé May; Luc Hoffmann; Dan Gerous; Raoul Thomé

Pronoian Made was an alternative rock/gothic metal band from Luxembourg which gained notoriety for being the first to play gothic influenced rock in the country, and also for being the first to succeed beyond national borders.

== History ==
Founded in 1989 by Oliver Made (vocals and guitar) initially under the name The Escape and later Hegemonikon, before finally settling on Pronoian Made. The name changes reflected the natural evolution from punk music in the early days to a more mature and modern rock and metal sound with melancholic melodies and ethereal guitars, often compared to Sister of Mercy. The band released three official albums, earning them positive reviews from gothic music magazines (like Zillo, Orkus and Sonic Seducer) and putting "the new hope of the gothic-metal scene" on the radar of several European tour promoters.

Pronoian Made had already earned a solid reputation as live musicians by playing numerous concerts throughout Luxembourg and across the nearby borders, before the positive reviews of both "Welcome in Pronoia" and "EP1613" gave them the opportunity to play to larger, international audiences in France and Germany, including several major music festivals. In the wake of the EP1613 release, the band played Emergenza Festival, Rock um Knuedler and Eurorock Festival, opened for bigger bands, like HIM, The Crüxshadows, Clan of Xymox, and Zeraphine, which finally culminated in playing the legendary Wave-Gotik-Treffen in Leipzig - twice - as well as being featured on the official festival sampler (again, twice), achieving something no other rock band from Luxembourg has ever managed before them.

The first Wave Gotik Treffen performance of Pronoian Made marked the band's apex; in the following year, bassist Dan Gerous departed the band in the middle of recording of "Circus Made", the follow-up album to EP1613, citing personal reasons. While he retired from playing, his new projects are still music related, working as a concert photographer and launching The Black Angel online shop, which provides many musicians and artists with stage apparel (including Nathan "Joey" Jordison, Nik Page, November-7, Chris Angel & Cirque du Soleil and Universal Studios).

After a short hiatus, the band line-up was complemented by a new bassist (ex-Pale Obsession) Joe May and the return of Hegemonikon drummer Luc Hoffman. The songs from "Circus Made" were overhauled with a different sound and re-recorded, and the album later released under the name "Cherubim". Pronoian Made toured Europe for another year, leading to the second Wave Gotik Performance, but in the end the band could not regain the same momentum, and ultimately split. Neal Lisé and Luc Hoffmann retired from music, while Oliver Made and Joe May went on to form a new band together in 2009, Luceed, playing ethnic influenced keyboard and guitars music the band calls "Voodoo-Pop".

"Cherubim" was the last official output of the band, whose discography spans three official albums ("Welcome in Pronoia", "EP1613" and "Cherubim") and numerous samplers ("Künstler zum WGT vol.11 & 13", "Dark Awakenings vol.3", "Dark Horizons", "Zillo-Scope 06/2004", and more).

== Members ==
=== Last known line-up ===
- Oliver Made: vocals and guitars
- Neal Lisé: guitars
- Joe May: bass
- Luc Hoffmann: drums (1991-1996 & 2002-2004)

=== Previous known band members ===
- Dan Gerous: Bass (1999–2002)
- Raoul Thomé: bass (unknown)
- Beppo (bass, the Escape)
- Mitch (drums, the Escape)

== Releases ==
=== Official discography ===
1995 - Welcome in Pronoia This record is the debut album of Pronoian Made, recorded in the lapse of a few days at One World Studios during the summer of 1995. It contains some rock and metal songs as well as slower and sadder songs, already showing the direction future recordings would take. While most of the songs were written especially for this record, it also features three classic songs from the early debuts of the band (Land of the Night, War, The Solution). This album was originally released under the name "Hegemonikon". Recorded by the line-up Made/Lisé/Thomé.

The complete track list of the album:

- 1 - Rain in Pronoia
- 2 - Deadly Angel
- 3 - Land of the Night
- 4 - Let the Story begin
- 5 - Heavenly Hell
- 6 - To a Nation
- 7 - King of the Apocalypse
- 8 - Welcome in Pronoia
- 9 - War
- 10 - The Solution

1998 - Demos & Mixes This record is a multimedia disc containing two new songs ("Her Waltz" and "Ode / Do love my sin"), a new version of the "Land of the Night", a live track ("Child DC", also a new song) and "Welcome in Pronoia" from the debut album. The multimedia part of the CD is made of pictures and artwork, as well as a presentation of the band itself. It works with both Macintosh and PC. Recorded by the line-up Made/Lisé.

The complete track list of the album:

- 1 - Her Waltz
- 2 - Ode
- 3 - Land of the Night
- 4 - Child D.C.
- 5 - Welcome in Pronoia

2001 - EP1613 This 5 track mini-record was highly acclaimed both by national and international press, and brought the band first international reviews and slots on international bills and festivals, including the famous Wave Gotik Treffen. This record is self-produced and was recorded by the trio Made/Gerous/Lisé in a mere few days in their regular rehearsal studio.

The complete track list of the album:

- 1 - The Pronoian Song
- 2 - She Walks in Beauty
- 3 - At His Request
- 4 - Child D.C.
- 5 - Disproportion

2003 - Cherubim Recorded by the line-up Made/Lisé/May/Hoffman. This album was originally planned to be released under the name "Circus Made", but both the title track and album name were dropped after bassist Dan Gerous left the band in the middle of the recording process in May 2001. The complete recordings were dropped, and recorded again two years later, with a new line-up, and released by Equinoxe Records.

The complete track list of the album:

- 1 - Appear and Laugh
- 2 - Koh-lanta part II
- 3 - Inner Circle
- 4 - The Storm
- 5 - The Secret
- 6 - Recurrence
- 7 - World Bizarre
- 8 - Last Respite
- 9 - A Wedding Song (fragment)

=== Samplers and other releases ===
- 2002 - Künstler Zum 11. Wave-Gotik-Treffen
- 2003 - Dark Awakening Vol. 3
- 2004 - Künstler Zum 13. Wave-Gotik-Treffen
- 2004 - Sonic Seducer Cold Hands Seduction Vol. 38
- 2004 - Zilloscope New Signs and Sounds 2004/06
