= Grand Théâtre de Luxembourg =

Theatre and opera house in Luxembourg City, Luxembourg

- Interactive map of Grand Théâtre de Luxembourg
- Former names: Théâtre Municipal de la Ville de Luxembourg
- Location: Luxembourg City, Luxembourg
- Coordinates: 49°37′02″N 6°07′36″E
- Capacity: 943 seats (main theatre); 400 seats (studio)

Construction
- Groundbreaking: Autumn 1959
- Opened: 15 April 1964
- Renovated: 2002–2003
- Architect: Alain Bourbonnais

The Grand Théâtre de Luxembourg, inaugurated in 1964 as the Théâtre Municipal de la Ville de Luxembourg is the city's major venue for drama, opera and ballet. It underwent renovation work in 2002–2003 resulting in substantial improvements to the stage technology, acoustics and lighting facilities.

== History ==
Since 1869, Luxembourg City's main theatre had been the Théâtre des Capucins located near the centre of the old town. In December 1958, after the need for a properly designed theatre building had become a priority, a competition was launched with a view to completing the construction work for the millennium celebrations in 1963. The winner was Alain Bourbonnais (1925–1988), a Parisian architect. Work began in autumn 1959 and the theatre was festively inaugurated on 15 April 1964.

Over the years, it became increasingly difficult to cope with the staging requirements of touring companies. Safety requirements also needed to be upgraded while asbestos had to be removed from the existing fabric. The work was entrusted to Kurt Gerling and Werner Arendt of Gerling + Arendt Planungsgesellschaft mbH of Berlin. Hence, in 2002–2003 the building was equipped with modern facilities and technical features, satisfying European requirements in regard to stage technology and facility management while the distinctive architecture of the original 1960s building remained intact.

== Current configuration ==
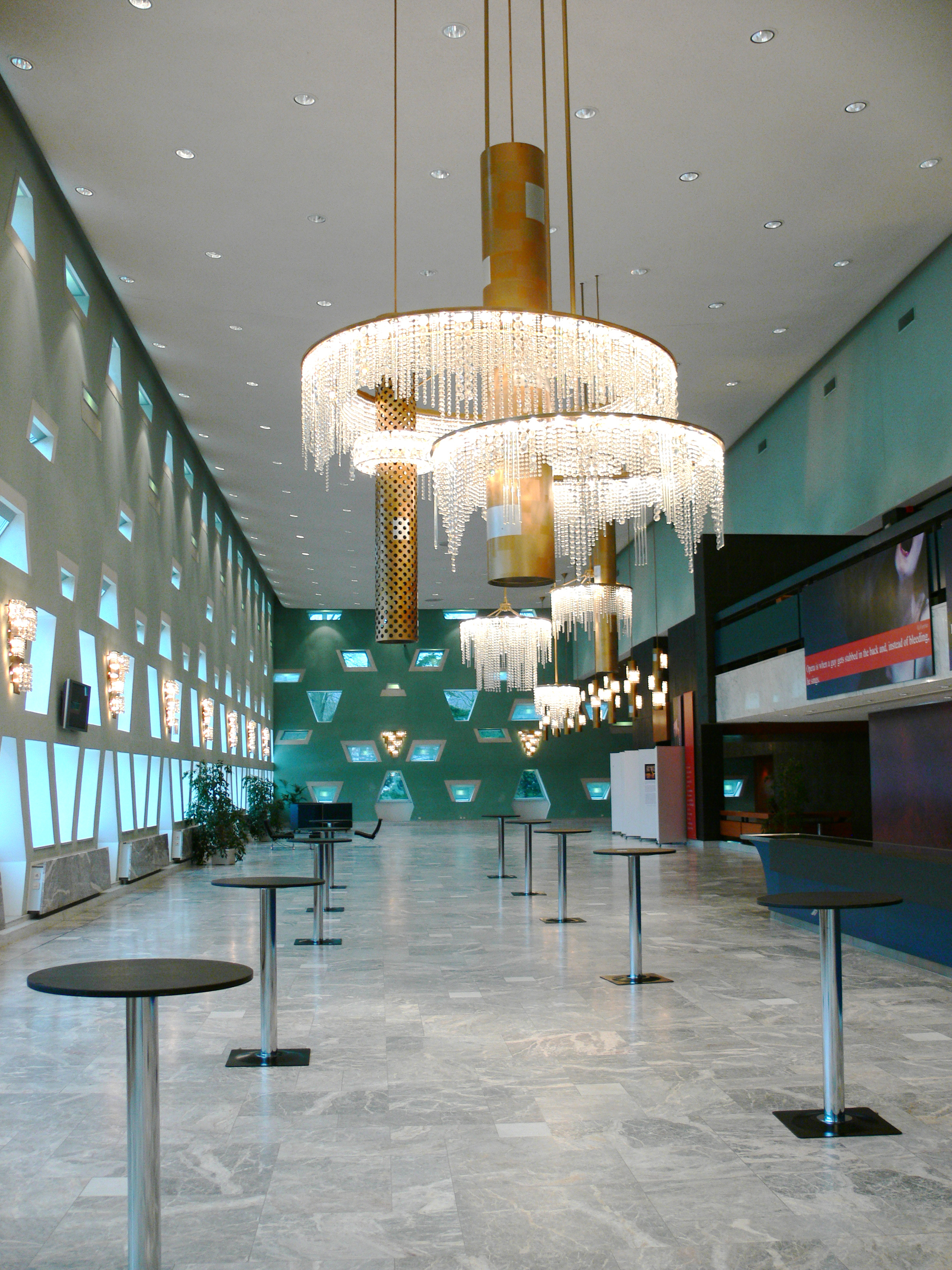
The upper foyer area

The theatre consists of two auditoriums: the main theatre with 943 seats and the studio which has up to 400 seats but can be compartmentalized. There is also an underground car park with 450 parking spaces. Improved cloakroom facilities have been installed in the lower level of the foyer while a new bar and fittings have been added to the upper level.

== Collaboration and performances ==
Able to accommodate high calibre productions in opera, theatre and dance, the Grand Théâtre is one of the most sophisticated venues in Europe. In recent years, collaboration has extended to the English National Opera, the Barbican Centre, the National Theatre of Great Britain and Deutsches Theater Berlin. There have been coproductions with La Monnaie, Brussels, the Wooster Group, New York, and the Théâtre National de l'Opéra Comique, Paris. Visiting dance companies have included Nederlands Dans Theater, Anne Teresa de Keersmaeker, and the Michael Clark Company. The theatre has twice been the host venue for the Eurovision Song Contest, in 1973 and again in 1984. In 2007 it saw the premiere performance of Jonathan Harvey's opera Wagner Dream.

== Location ==
The Grand Théâtre is located on the north-eastern corner of the Rond-Point Schumann, between the Glacis, where there is plenty of parking space, and the Red Bridge.

Preceded by Usher Hall; Edinburgh	Eurovision Song Contest; Venue; 1973	Succeeded by The Dome; Brighton
Preceded by Rudi-Sedlmayer-Halle; Munich	Eurovision Song Contest; Venue; 1984	Succeeded by Scandinavium; Gothenburg
