= Emile Boeres =

Composer and musician

Jean-Pierre Emile Boeres (13 November 1890 – 18 August 1944) was a Luxembourgish composer, organist and choir master.

Born in Luxembourg City, he wrote operettas and musical comedies in Luxembourgish. In 1934, he founded the Wiener Operette and the Lëtzebuerger Musekerverband. He also contributed to the Lëtzebuerger Revue.

During the German occupation, the Théâtre des Capucins put on operas, ballets and plays in German but the German authorities were very wary of productions in Luxembourgish which were considered anti-German. On 18 November 1940, Boeres' operetta Wann d'Blieder falen (When the leaves fall) enjoyed a huge success as the audience sought to show its support for a free Luxembourg by attending a performance in the Luxembourg language.

Boeres died in Luxembourg City on 18 August 1944 after a cycling accident.

== Works ==
- 1935: "Fre'johr"
- 1936: "Spuenescht Blutt"
- 1936: "Wann d'Blieder falen"
- 1937: "Landstroosselidd"
- 1939: "Den éiwege Wee"
- 1941: "D'Wonner vu Spe'sbech"
