= Françoise Groben =

Luxembourgish cellist (1965–2011)

Françoise Groben (4 December 1965 – 28 May 2011) was a Luxembourgish cellist who performed widely and won several awards. She made recordings for radio, television and CDs.

== Biography ==
Born on 4 December 1965 in Luxembourg City, Groben first studied the cello with Georges Mallach at the Conservatoire de Luxembourg. She continued with Boris Pergamenschikow at the Musikhochschule, Cologne, and subsequently with William Pleeth, Daniil Shafran, as well as with members of the Amadeus Quartet. In 1990 she won 2nd prize in the International Tchaikovsky Competition in Moscow.

She played with a number of prestigious orchestras including the Bavarian Radio Symphony Orchestra, the NHK Symphony Orchestra, Leningrad Philharmonic, Jerusalem Symphony Orchestra, and the Russian State Orchestra and participated in many music festivals around the globe. In 1998, she became the cellist in the Zehetmair Quartet founded by Thomas Zehetmair, playing in Lisbon, Munich, Leipzig, Cologne, Salzburg, Paris, Brussels, Vienna and Berlin as well as on tour in the United States, Australia and the Far East. Thanks to the support of Banque Générale de Luxembourg, she played a Matteo Goffriller cello from 1695.

Françoise Groben died on 28 May 2011 of cancer when she was only 45 years old.

== Discography ==
- Corelli, Haydn, Mozart, Solistes Européens Luxembourg with Françoise Groben (SEL Classics)
- Luigi Boccherini: Concertos pour violoncelle, Solistes Européens Luxembourg a Françoise Groben (SEL Classics)
- Music Made in Luxembourg, Solistes Européens Luxembourg with Françoise Groben and others. (SEL Classics)
- String Quartets Nos. 1 & 3 by Robert Schumann with the Zehetmair Quartet ECM Record (Universal) (11 February 2003)
- Works for Chamber Ensemble by Francis Poulenc Vol. 2 played by Alexandre Tharaud, Françoise Groben and others. Naxos (3 April 2000)
- Busoni-Edition (Chamber Music) by Ferruccio Busoni played by Rainer Wehle, Françoise Groben and others. Capriccio (DELTA MUSIC) (27 December 2000)
- Brahms : Intégrale des Trios avec piano (avec Graf Mourja, violon & Peter Laul, piano)
