= Camille Kerger =

Luxembourgish composer, opera singer and music teacher

Camille Kerger (born 1957) is a Luxembourgish composer, opera singer and music teacher. In 1996, he was a founding member of the Théâtre National de Luxembourg which he directed until 2006. Since 1982, he has composed a wide variety of chamber and orchestral works.

== Early life ==
Kerger was born on 9 February 1957 in Redange-sur-Attert in central Luxembourg. He studied trombone, singing and composition at the Conservatoire de Luxembourg, in Metz, and at the Mannheim and Düsseldorf Musikhochschule where he graduated in singing.

== Career ==
He first played as a trombonist in various orchestras including the RTL Symphony Orchestra and the Trier Theatre Orchestra. He was twice a member of the European Youth Orchestra and played in numerous chamber ensembles. As a tenor opera singer, he has performed at a variety of venues across Europe, sharing the stage with celebrates such as Barbara Hendricks and James Bowman and working under the leadership of Leopold Hager, Pierre Cao and Robert King. In 1996, he was a founding member of Théâtre National du Luxembourg which he led until June 2006. He is currently the director of Luxembourg's Institut Européen de Chant Choral. Since 2007, he has been a member of the Art and Literature section of the Grand Ducal Institute.

== Compositions ==
Kerger has composed about a hundred works for chamber ensembles, symphony orchestras and opera which have been played widely by ensembles and orchestras across Europe including Alter Ego (Rome), Gaudeamus (Amsterdam) and Parnassus (London) as well as the Luxembourg Philharmonic Orchestra and the London Symphony Orchestra. In 2000, his composition "Altars of Light" for choir and orchestra was awarded first prize at the French competition L’an 1000, l’année 2000.

Among his most successful works are:

- Mélusina, chamber opera (1995)
- Il Signor Drago, opera for children (1995)
- Rinderwahn, opera (1999)
- Ein Mond aus kochender Milch, opera (2003)
