= Echternach Music Festival =

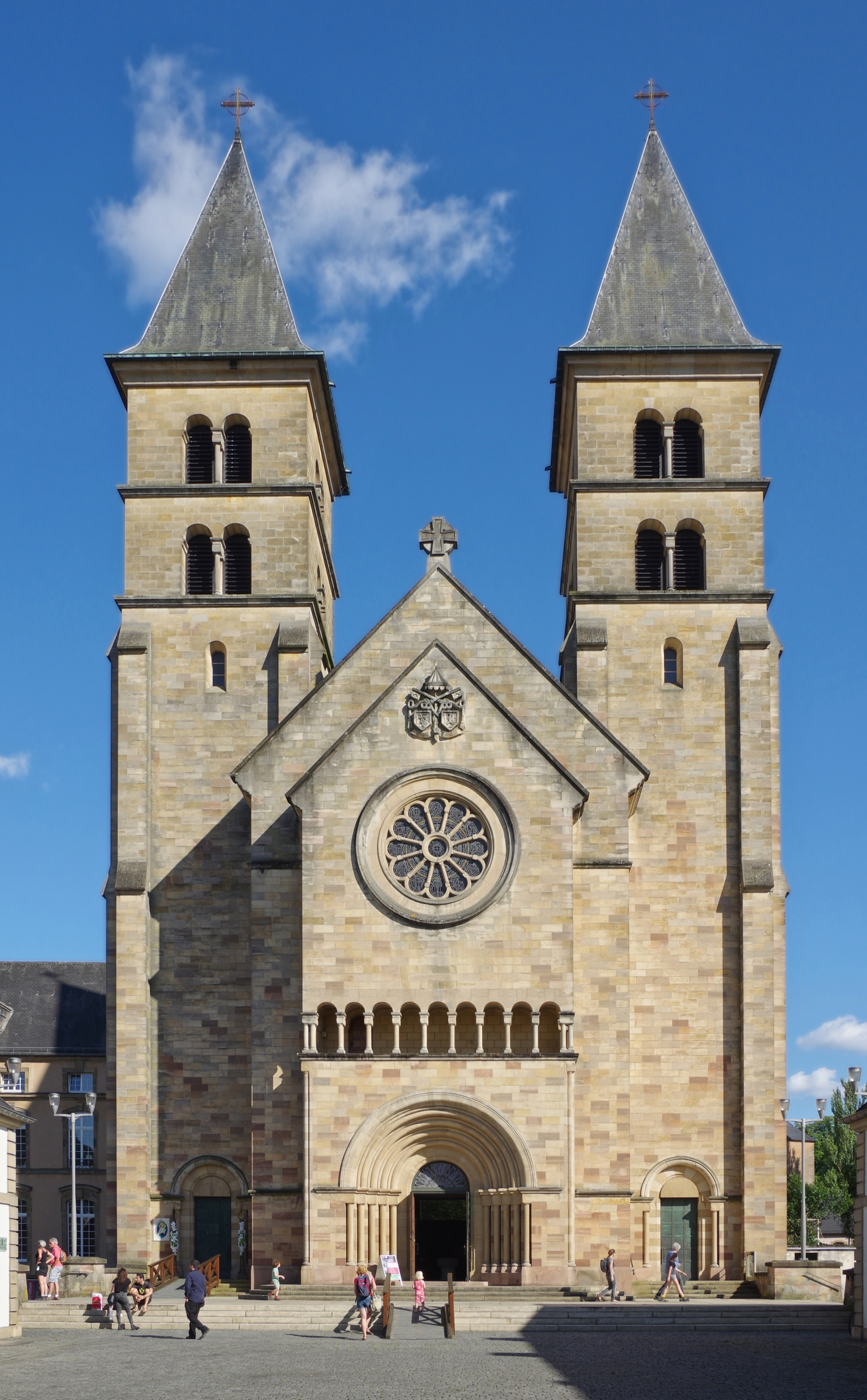
The Echternach Basilica

The Echternach Music Festival (now Echterlive Festival) is an international event which was held in May and June every year from 1975 at Echternach in the east of Luxembourg. In addition to classical music, modern compositions were performed in the 18th century basilica of St Willibrord and in the church of St Peter and Paul. Since 2008, there has also been a jazz festival held in September and October. Over the years, renowned international artists such as Yehudi Menuhin, Gidon Kremer, Mstislav Rostropovich, Maurice André, Dietrich Fischer-Dieskau, Yo-Yo Ma, Bobby McFerrin or Jordi Savall played. The festival rebranded as the Echterlive Festival in 2019, and celebrated its 44th anniversary that year.

== History ==
The Echternach Music Festival was an international event which was held in May and June every year between 1975 and 2018 at Echternach in the east of Luxembourg. In addition to classical music, modern compositions were performed in the 18th century basilica of St Willibrord and in the church of St Peter and Paul. In 2008 the Trifolion, a modern concert hall, was added to the venues. A jazz festival held in September and October was also added to the even in 2008. The festival rebranded as the Echterlive Festival in 2019, and celebrated its 44th year in 2019.

The festival was founded by Georges Calteux and Dr. Jean Kraft. Pianist Cyprien Katsaris was the artistic director for thirty years. Adrien Meisch, a former Ambassador of Luxembourg, and Georges Santer have both served as chairman.

Over the years, renowned international artists such as Yehudi Menuhin, Gidon Kremer, Mstislav Rostropovich, Maurice André, Dietrich Fischer-Dieskau, Yo-Yo Ma, Bobby McFerrin or Jordi Savall played alongside young talent from Luxembourg and abroad. Musically speaking the Festival ranges from medieval and classic music to jazz and world music.
