= Jean Antoine Zinnen =

Luxembourgish composer of the national anthem (1827–1898)

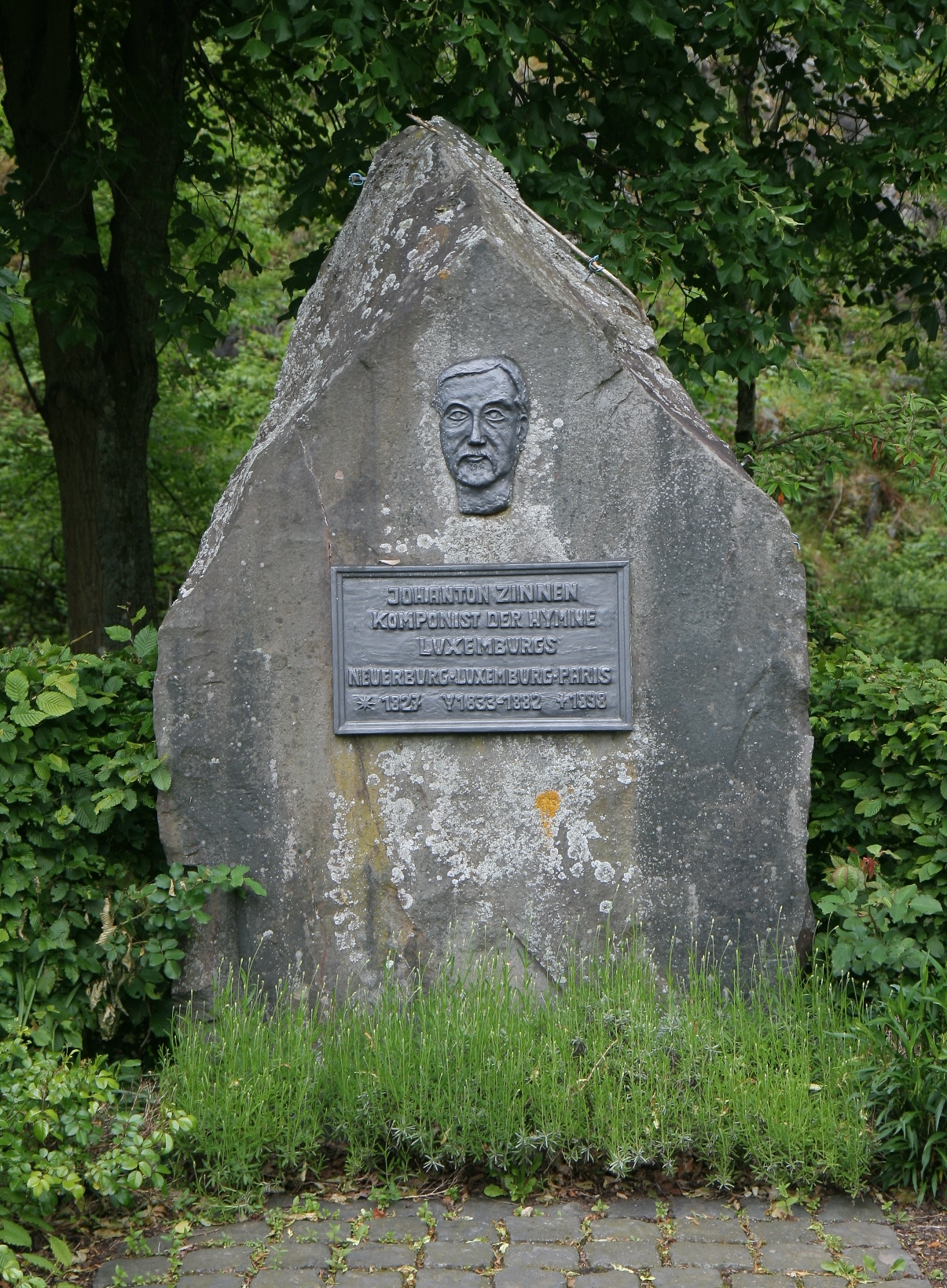
Memorial in Neuerburg

"Ons Heemecht"
Zinnen's music to "Ons Heemecht" performed by the United States Navy Band

Jean Antoine Zinnen (25 April 1827 – 16 May 1898) was a Luxembourgish composer, best known for the Luxembourgish national anthem, Ons Heemecht.

== Career ==
Zinnen was born in Neuerburg, in the Prussian Rhineland, close to the border with Luxembourg. When he was six, his family moved to Luxembourg. After serving as a musician in the army, he naturalised as a Luxembourgish citizen in 1849. In 1851, he became the first director of the Diekirch choral society Sangerbond. In 1852, he was appointed Luxembourg City's director of music, and, soon after, director of the city conservatoire. In 1863, he was appointed the director of the newly founded Allgemeiner Luxemburger Musikverein (ALM) which, in 1947, was renamed Union Grand-Duc Adolphe, the national umbrella organisation for music societies, bands, choirs and orchestras.

== Ons Hémecht ==
The following year, at the first celebration of the ALM in Ettlebrück, Ons Hémecht was sung by a choir. Michel Lentz, the national poet who was a member of the ALM's central committee, had written the words, wishing to convey a powerful feeling of patriotism. Zinnen set the poem to music, later transforming it into a solemn hymn. On 25 June 1865, on the occasion of a music festival in Vianden, Ons Hémecht was performed for the first time with an instrumental accompaniment. Ons Heemecht was adopted as Luxembourg's national anthem in 1895.

Jean-Antoine Zinnen died in Neuilly-sur-Seine, France, at the age of 71, and was buried in Limpertsberg, Luxembourg City. Two years after his death, a monument was constructed at the churchyard in which he is buried, paid for by private donations.
