= Laurent Menager =

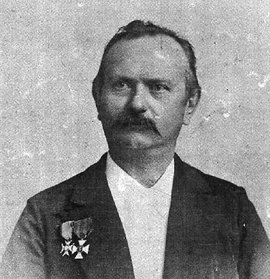
Laurent Menager

Laurent Menager (1835–1902) was a Luxembourgish composer, choirmaster, organist and conductor who is often referred to as Luxembourg's national composer. He founded the national choral association Sang a Klang (1857) and composed many songs, orchestral music and operettas as well as music for brass bands and the theatre.

== Biography ==
The son of a baker, Menager was born on 10 January 1835 in the Pfaffenthal district of Luxembourg City. He attended the Luxembourg Athenée before continuing his studies with Professor Hiller at the Academy of Music in Cologne. Employed for no less than 46 years by the municipality of Luxembourg, he was a professor at the Luxembourg Music School. He also taught music and singing at the Athenée and at the teachers training school and directed several choral societies. He was a friend of the poets Dicks and Lentz, collaborating with them on several compositions. His compositions covered choral works, symphonies, operettas, chamber music and music for military bands. Of particular interest is his church music. His Pie Jesu and Ihr lieben Vöglein are among his most masterly compositions.

When Menager died on 7 February 1902, he had become so popular that he was mourned by the entire nation. Over 6,000 people, including representatives of 45 societies, attended his funeral.

== Selected works ==
Chamber music:

- "Quatuor à cordes" (1859)

Choral works and lieder:

- "De schie long" (1894)
- "Unsere Heimath"
- "Margréitchen"
- "De Lëtzebuerger Greechen"
- "Déi schéinste Blumm"
- "Eng Tréin"
- "Ihr lieben Vögelein"
- "Aus der Kannerzäit"

Operettas:

- "Den Här an d'Madame Tullepant" (1893)
- "Den Här President"
- "En ass rosen"
- "De scheie Jong"

== Discography ==
- "Laurent Menager - Historesch Opnamen", Centre national de l'audiovisuel, Luxembourg, 2005. Collection of three CDs.
