= Théâtre des Capucins =

Coordinates: 49.6128°N 6.1305°E

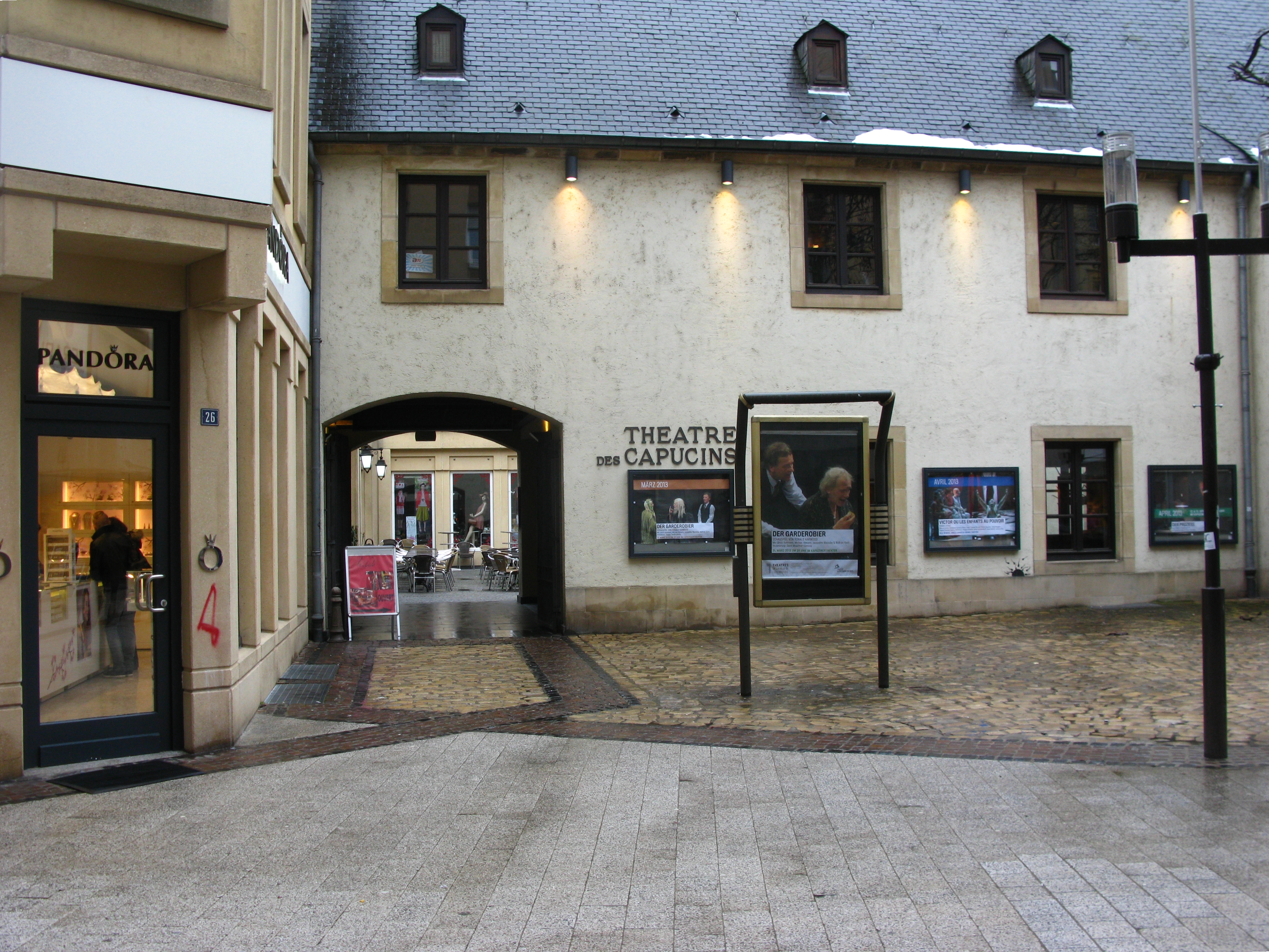
Théâtre des Capucins

Théâtre des Capucins (Luxembourgish: Kapuzinertheater) is a theatre in Luxembourg City, Luxembourg. It is part of the Théâtres de la Ville de Luxembourg. Directed by Frank Feitler, the Capucin Theater is located in the heart of the Old Town. It puts on performances in German, French and Luxembourgish.
