= Gustave Kahnt =

Luxembourgish composer and conductor (1848–1923)

Gustave Kahnt (1848–1923) was a Luxembourgish composer and conductor of German origin.

Born on 7 October 1848 in Berlin, Kahnt was naturalized as a Luxembourger in 1890. From 1881–1909, he was bandmaster of the Luxembourg Army's Military Band. He composed marches, folk songs, theatre music and operettas, often setting to music the works of Dicks and N. S. Pierret. He died in Berschbach, Luxembourg, on 9 January 1923.

== Works ==
Operettas in Luxembourgish

- "D'Artiste vu Juxda", music: Gustave Kahnt, text: Jos Sevenig
- "De Kommissär kënnt", music: Gustav Kahnt, text: Jos Sevenig
- "De Pistouleclub", music: Gustave Kahnt, text: Jos Sevenig
- "En Dag an der Hell", text and music: Gustave Kahnt
- "Eng Loftkur op Lusdag", music: Gustave Kahnt, text: Jos Sevenig
- "De Geescht an der Bakstuff", music: Gustave Kahnt, text: Jos Sevenig

Marches

- "Edmond", march
- "Ferdinand", march
- "G.-D. Guillaume", march

Other compositions

- "Lentziana"
- "Lëtzebuerger Zaldoteliewen"
- "Ouverture Nationale"
