= Louis Beicht =

Louis Jean Nicolas Beicht (1886–1943) was a Luxembourgish composer.

Born on 26 July 1886 in the Grund district of Luxembourg City, Beicht was a civil servant who composed marches, waltzes, folk songs, chansons and theatre music. He also composed operetta music for Luxembourgish musical comedies by Josy Imdahl.

Beicht died in Luxembourg City on 29 October 1943.

== Works ==
- 1916: "D'Joffer Marie-Madeleine" (text: Josy Imdahl)
- 1927: "Déi vum iewëschten Haff" (text: Josy Imdahl)
