= Joseph-Alexandre Müller =

Joseph-Alexandre Müller, often known simply as J. A. Müller, (1854–1931) was a Luxembourgish composer.

== Biography ==
Born on 16 July 1854 in Echternach, Müller was a primary school teacher. He was also an organist and composed many folk songs, setting to music the poetic works of his contemporaries. He died in Luxembourg City on 13 November 1931.

== Recorded works ==
- "Du gutt Mamm, verloss" (Ech wees eng Mamm), LMK066
- "Eichentod", LMK070
- "Eichentod Seite 11 Schön ist die Welt", LMK154
- "Eng Kineksrous", LMK006
- "Kee schéinert Gleck", LMK246
- "Mäi Letzebuerg", LMK005
- "Wann d'Klacke lauden", LMK049
