= Ons Heemecht =

National anthem of Luxembourg

English: 'Our Homeland'
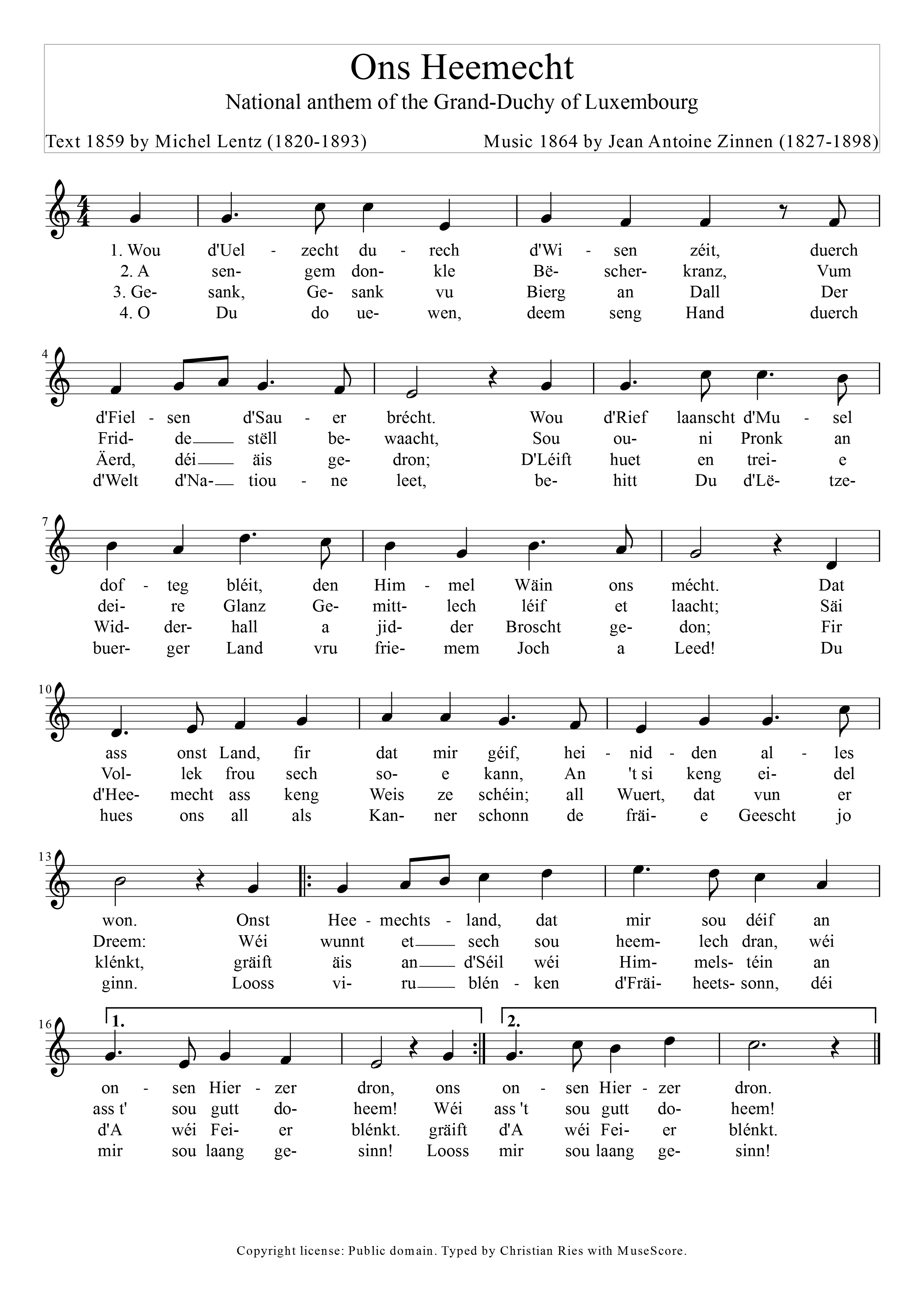
- National anthem of Luxembourg
- Lyrics: Michel Lentz, 1859
- Music: Jean Antoine Zinnen, 1864
- Adopted: 1895 (de facto); 1993 (de jure)

Audio sample
- U.S. Navy Band instrumental rendition in B-flat major: file; help

"Ons Heemecht" (formerly "Ons Hémecht", pronounced [ons ˈheːməɕt]; lit. 'Our Homeland') is the national anthem of Luxembourg. Written by Michel Lentz in 1859 and set to music by Jean Antoine Zinnen in 1864, it is performed at national celebrations, while the grand ducal anthem "De Wilhelmus" is performed at entrances or exits of members of the Grand Ducal Family.

== History ==
Luxembourgish poet Michel Lentz wrote the poem Ons Heemecht in 1859, and it was set to music by Luxembourgish composer Jean Antoine Zinnen in 1864. The song was first performed in public in Ettelbruck, a town at the confluence of the Alzette and Sauer rivers (both of which are mentioned in the song), on 5 June 1864.

"Ons Heemecht" competed for a while with "De Feierwon", a song based on another poem by Lentz, for the status of the national anthem. The last line of the chorus of "De Feierwon" became the origin of Luxembourg's national motto.

The first and last stanzas of "Ons Heemecht" were adopted as Luxembourg's national anthem on 17 June 1993, when it was added as one of the official national emblems, alongside the national flag, the national coat of arms and the Grand Duke's Official Birthday.

== Lyrics ==
The official version is only composed of the first and last stanzas.

Luxembourgish original

Wou d'Uelzecht durech d'Wisen zéit,
Duerch d'Fielsen d'Sauer brécht,
Wou d'Rief laanscht d'Musel dofteg bléit,
Den Himmel Wäin ons mécht:
Dat as onst Land, fir dat mir (Note: Occasionally written mer [mɐ], the corresponding unstressed pronoun.) géif
Hei nidden alles won,
𝄆 Ons Heemechtsland dat mir sou (Note: Occasionally written so [zo].) déif 𝄇
An onsen Hierzer dron.

An sengem donkle Bëscherkranz,
Vum Fridde stëll bewaacht,
Sou ouni Pronk an deire Glanz
Gemittlech léif et laacht;
Säi Vollek frou sech soë kann,
An 't si keng eidel Dreem:
𝄆 Wéi wunnt et sech sou heemlech dran, 𝄇
Wéi as 't sou gutt doheem!

Gesank, Gesank vu Bierg an Dall
Der Äärd, déi äis gedron; (Note: Sometimes written Der Ierd, déi ons gedron [dɐ ˈiːɐ̯t dəɪ̯ ons ɡəˈdʀon].)
D'Léift huet en treie Widderhall
A jidder Broschts (Note: Sometimes written Broscht.) gedon;
Fir, d'Hemecht (Note: Sometimes written d'Heemecht.) ass keng Weis ze schéin;
All Wuert, dat vun er klénkt,
𝄆 Gräift äis (Note: Sometimes written ons.) an d' Séil wéi Himmelstéin 𝄇
An d'A wéi Feier blénkt.

O Du do uewen, deen seng Hand
Duerch d'Welt d'Natioune leet,
Behitt Du d'Lëtzebuerger Land
Vru friemem Joch a Leed;
Du hues ons all als Kanner schon
De fräie Geescht jo ginn,
𝄆 Looss viru blénken d'Fräiheetssonn, 𝄇
Déi mir sou laang gesinn!

IPA transcription

[vəʊ̯ ˈduəlt͡səɕ ˈduʀəɕ ˈdviːzən t͡səɪ̯t
du̯əɕ ˈtfi̯əlzən ˈdzɑʊ̯ɐ bʀəɕt
vəʊ̯ dʀi̯əf laːnʃt ˈmuzəl ˈdoftəɕ bləɪ̯t
dən ˈhiməl væːɪ̯n ons məɕt
daːd ɑz onst lɑnt fiːɐ̯ daːt miːɐ̯ gəɪ̯f
hɑɪ̯ ˈnidən ˈɑləs von
𝄆 ons ˈheːməɕ(t)sˌlɑn(t) daːt miːɐ̯ zəʊ̯ dəɪ̯f 𝄇
ɑn ˈonzən ˈhiːɐ̯t͡sɐ dʀon

ɑn ˈzæŋəm ˈdoŋklə ˈbəʃɐˌkʀɑnt͡s
fum ˈfʀidə ʃtəl bəˈvaːχt
zəʊ̯ ˈəʊ̯ni pʀoŋg ɑn ˈdɑɪ̯ʀə glɑnt͡s
gəˈmitləɕ ləɪ̯v ət laːχt
zæːɪ̯ ˈfolək fʀəʊ̯ zəɕ ˈsoə kɑn
ɑn tsi kæŋ ˈɑɪ̯dəl dʀeːm
𝄆 vəɪ̯ vund ət zəɕ zəʊ̯ ˈheːmləɕ dʀɑn 𝄇
vəɪ̯ ɑs tsəʊ̯ gut doˈheːm

gəˈzɑŋk gəˈzɑŋk fu biːɐ̯ʑ ɑn dɑl
dɐ ɛːɐ̯t dəɪ̯ æːɪ̯s gəˈdʀon
dləɪ̯ft hu̯əd ən ˈtʀɑɪ̯ə ˈvidɐˌhɑl
ɑ ˈʒidɐ bʀoʃts gəˈdon
fiːɐ̯ ˈtheːməɕt ɑs kæŋ vɑɪ̯s t͡sə ʃəɪ̯n
ɑl vu̯ət daːt fun ɐ kleŋkt
𝄆 gʀæːɪ̯vd æːɪ̯z ɑn dzəɪ̯l vəɪ̯ ˈhiməlˌʃtəɪ̯n 𝄇
ɑn daː vəɪ̯ ˈfɑɪ̯ɐ bleŋkt

o du do ˈu̯əvən deːn zæŋ hɑnt
du̯əɕ dvælt nɑˈt͡sjəʊ̯nə leːt
bəˈhit du ˈdlətt͡səˌbu̯əjɐ lɑnt
fʀu ˈfʀi̯əməm joχ ɑ leːt
du hu̯əz ons ɑl ɑls ˈkɑ(n)nɐ ʃon
də ˈfʀæːɪ̯ə geːʃt jo gin
𝄆 loːs ˈfiʀu ˈbleŋkən ˈtfʀæːɪ̯heːtsˌson 𝄇
dəɪ̯ miːɐ̯ zəʊ̯ laːŋ gəˈzin]

English translation (Note: Adapted from a translation by Nicholas Weydert.)

Where Alzette winds through meadows fair,
Through rocky cliffs the Sauer flows,
Where vineyards bloom along the Moselle,
And heaven’s wine bestows.
This is our land, for which we’d dare
All things here down below,
𝄆 Our homeland, dear, so deeply loved,
Within our hearts we know. 𝄇

Within her shady forest ring,
By peaceful watch kept still,
Without display or gilded gleam,
She smiles with gentle will;
Her people happy in their hearts,
No empty dreams they know:
𝄆 How sweetly life is lived therein,
How good it is to go. 𝄇

From hill to dale, the songs resound,
The earth that gave us birth;
Love echoes true in every breast,
A loyal, faithful mirth;
For homeland, none can sing too fair,
Each word that speaks her name
𝄆 Touches our souls like heavenly stones,
And sparks our eyes like flame. 𝄇

O Thou on high, whose mighty hand
Guides nations near and far,
Protect our Luxembourgish land
From foreign yoke and war;
Give unto us, as once of old,
The spirit of the free;
𝄆 Let liberty’s bright, glorious sun
Shine ever o’er our plea. 𝄇

German translation (Note: Adapted from a translation by Joseph Groben.)

Wo die Alzette durch die Wiesen zieht,
Durch die Felsen die Sauer bricht,
Die Rebe längs der Mosel blüht,
Der Himmel Wein verspricht:
Dort ist das Land, für dessen Ehr
Kein Opfer uns zu schwer,
𝄆 Die Heimat, die als teures Gut
In unseren Herzen ruht. 𝄇

In seinem dunklen Wälderkranz,
vom Frieden still bewacht,
So ohne Prunk und teuren Glanz,
Gemütlich lieb es lacht.
Sein Volk sich glücklich sagen kann,
Und es sind keine leeren Träume:
𝄆 Wie heimelig sich's doch hier wohnt,
wie gut ist's doch daheim. 𝄇

Gesang, Gesang, von Berg und Tal
Die Erd', die uns getragen,
Die Lieb' hat einen treuen Widerhall
In jeder Brust getan.
Für die Heimat ist keine Weise zu schön,
Jedes Wort, das aus ihr klingt,
𝄆 Ergreift die Seel' wie Himmelstön'
Und unser Auge wie Feuer blinkt. 𝄇

O Du dort droben, dessen Hand
Den Völkern gibt Geleit,
Behüt das Luxemburger Land
Vor fremdem Joch, vor Leid!
Als Kind empfingen wir von Dir
Den freiheitlichen Sinn,
𝄆 Die Freiheitssonne, unsre Zier,
Lass leuchten fernerhin! 𝄇

French translation (Note: Adapted from a translation by Jean-Claude Muller.)

Où l'Alzette arrose champs et prés
La Sûre baigne les rochers;
Où la Moselle, riante et belle
Nous fait cadeau du vin
C'est notre pays pour lequel
Nous risquons tout sur terre;
𝄆 Notr'chère et adorable patrie
Dont notr'âme est remplie. 𝄇

Dans sa couronne bois sombre
toujours gardée par la paix,
Donc, sans faste et la splendeur cher,
Confortable à l'amour en riant.
Son peuple puisse dire est heureux
Et il n'ya pas de rêves vides :
𝄆 Comment est agréable mais voici la vie,
dans quelle mesure est-il de la maison. 𝄇

Chant, chant, de la montagne et la vallée
La terre, qui nous portait,
Les « amoureux a un écho fidèle »
effectué dans chaque sein.
Pour le pays quelque façon que ce soit trop beau
Chaque mot qui sonne hors de lui,
𝄆 Prendre l'âme comme Himmelstön
Et nos yeux brillants comme le feu. 𝄇

Ô Toi aux cieux qui nuit et jour
Diriges les nations du monde;
Écarte du pays de Luxembourg
L'oppression étrangère
Enfants nous avons reçu de Toi
L'esprit de la liberté;
𝄆 Permets au soleil de liberté
De luire à tout jamais. 𝄇
