= Conservatoire de Luxembourg =

Conservatoire in Luxembourg City, southern Luxembourg

Coordinates: 49°36′08″N 06°06′25″E

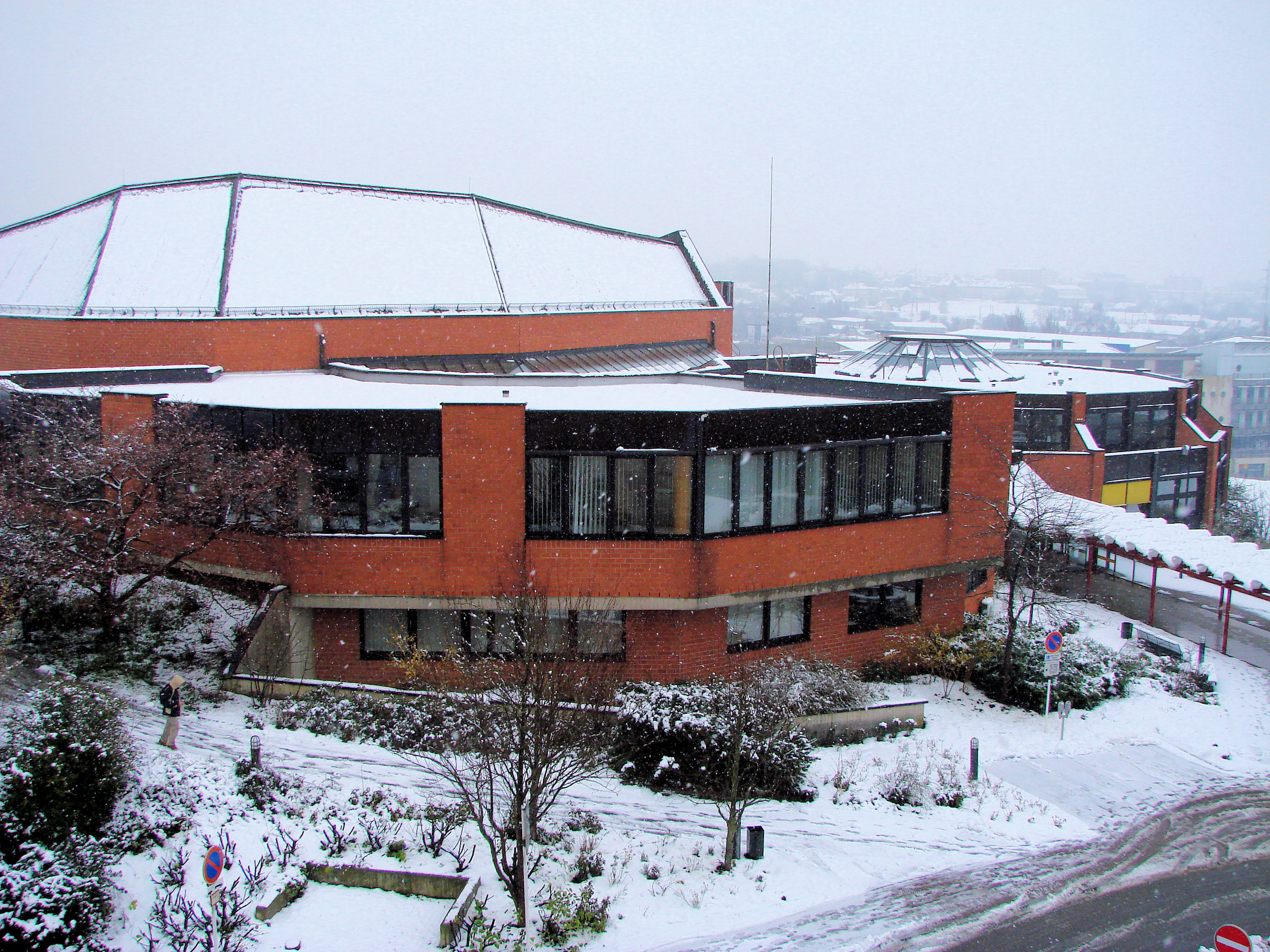
Conservatoire de Musique de la Ville de Luxembourg

The Conservatoire de Luxembourg is a music school in Luxembourg City, in southern Luxembourg. The conservatoire was founded in 1906, and teaches dance, music and drama to approximately 3,800 students. It is housed in a purpose-built building opened in 1984. The grand hall's Westenfelder organ was the first concert hall organ in Luxembourg. The conservatoire also has a museum of early musical instruments, a library and music archive.

== History ==
The conservatoire was founded in 1906, after a private donation made possible its establishment, which had been mandated under a Grand Ducal decree issued in 1904. The conservatoire teaches dance, music and drama to around 3,800 students from 80 different countries. There are around 170 professors. The school works across the city, but is located at rue Charles Martel.

== Facilities ==
The need for a new building emerged in the 1970s as a result of increasing demand. The foundation stone for the building on rue Charles Martel was laid on 19 June 1981, leading to the building's inauguration in 1984. There is a Westenfelder organ in the conservatoire's grand auditorium, the first concert hall organ in Luxembourg. The auditorium's excellent acoustics have attracted a wide range of performing artists including Bernard Haitink, Mstislav Rostropovich, Martha Argerich, Felicity Lott and Lazar Berman. The auditorium is closed for renovations from 2025 to 2027.

The conservatoire also houses a museum of early instruments, a specialist library, a music library, and a large archive of musical works. The instrument collection includes the piano on which Franz Liszt last played a public performance.
