= 2008 in Luxembourg =

- Decades: 1980s; 1990s; 2000s; 2010s; 2020s
- See also: History of Luxembourg; List of years in Luxembourg

The following lists events that happened during 2008 in the Grand Duchy of Luxembourg.

== Incumbents ==
Position	Incumbent
Grand Duke	Henri
Prime Minister	Jean-Claude Juncker
Deputy Prime Minister	Jean Asselborn
President of the Chamber of Deputies	Lucien Weiler
President of the Council of State	Alain Meyer
Mayor of Luxembourg City	Paul Helminger

== Events ==
=== January – March ===
- 24 January – The section of the A7 motorway between Lorentzweiler and Schoenfels opens.
- 1 April – A new terminal, the General Aviation Terminal, is opened at Luxembourg – Findel Airport by Lucien Lux.
- 15 February – Roger Molitor is appointed to the Council of State, replacing Pierre Mores, who resigned the previous September.
- 20 February – The Chamber of Deputies votes 30–26 in favour of the first reading of a bill legalising voluntary euthanasia in certain circumstances.

=== April – June ===
- 25 April – A new terminal, Terminal A, is opened at Luxembourg – Findel Airport by Grand Duke Henri.
- 20 May – The 2007-08 season of the National Division finishes, with F91 Dudelange winning the title for a fourth successive season.
- 22 May – Jean-Claude Juncker delivers his fourteenth State of the Nation address.
- 24 May – CS Grevenmacher win the Luxembourg Cup, beating FC Victoria Rosport 4–1 in the final, having relegated Rosport from the National Division the previous week.
- 8 June – The Netherlands' Joost Posthuma wins the 2008 Tour de Luxembourg.
- 17 June – Luxembourg, Belgium, and the Netherlands sign a new Benelux treaty.

=== July – September ===
- 29 August – Office rental group Regus announces that it would move its headquarters from the United Kingdom to Luxembourg.
- 10 September – Luxembourg's national football team defeats Switzerland 2–1 to record their first competitive victory since 1995.
- 28 September – The governments of Luxembourg, Belgium, and the Netherlands agree to part-nationalise Fortis and recapitalise the bank with public money. Luxembourg's government injects €2.5bn, and receives 49% of Fortis's Luxembourg operations in return.
- 30 September – Dexia is part-nationalised by the governments of France, Belgium, and Luxembourg. Luxembourg loans Dexia €400m.

=== October – December ===
- 6 October – The new 'Judiciary City' in Luxembourg City is officially inaugurated.
- 3 November – The National Literature Awards are held, with Carine Krecké winning first prize.
- 19 November – The national football team draws 1–1 with Belgium, three days before the Luxembourg Football Federation's hundredth anniversary.
- 2 December – Grand Duke Henri unexpectedly announces that he will not sign the pending euthanasia bill if it is passed by the Chamber of Deputies, creating a constitutional crisis.
- 9 December – Cyclist Fränk Schleck is cleared of doping charges.
- 11 December – The Chamber of Deputies votes 56 votes to none, with one abstention, to strip the Grand Duke of his right to withhold assent from legislation.
- 12 December – A Belgian court rules that the division of Fortis between the three Benelux governments cannot proceed.

== Deaths ==
- 29 January – Marcelle Lentz-Cornette, politician
