= 2001 in Luxembourg =

- Decades: 1980s; 1990s; 2000s; 2010s; 2020s
- See also: History of Luxembourg; List of years in Luxembourg

The following lists events that happened during 2001 in the Grand Duchy of Luxembourg.

== Incumbents ==
Position	Incumbent
Grand Duke	Henri
Prime Minister	Jean-Claude Juncker
Deputy Prime Minister	Lydie Polfer
President of the Chamber of Deputies	Jean Spautz
President of the Council of State	Raymond Kirsch (until 13 January); Marcel Sauber (from 15 January)
Mayor of Luxembourg City	Paul Helminger

== Events ==
=== January – March ===
- 19 February – Agreement of merger between Arbed, Usinor, and Aceralia to form Arcelor.
- 23 February – Grand Duke Henri amends the grand ducal coat of arms.
- 26 February – The district tribunal of Luxembourg City opens an investigation into the Clearstream Affair.
- 28 March – SES Astra announces that the company will be reconstituted as SES Global (now just SES), and that the new group will buy GE Americom from GE Capital for $2.4bn of cash and $3.5bn of shares.

=== April – June ===
- 3 May – Jean-Claude Juncker delivers his seventh State of the Nation address.
- 15 May – André Lussi is suspended as CEO of Clearstream.
- 24 May – FC Etzella Ettelbruck win the Luxembourg Cup, beating FC Wiltz 71 5–3 in the final.
- 16 June – SES Astra launches its Astra 2C satellite.
- 17 June – Jorgen Bo Petersen wins the 2001 Tour de Luxembourg, with Fassa Bortolo picking up the team title.

=== July – September ===
- 17 July – The commune of Bettborn is renamed 'Préizerdaul'.

=== October – December ===
- 2 October – La Voix du Luxembourg is launched as a separate newspaper, having previously been a French-language supplement of the Luxemburger Wort.
- 1 November – Allan Simonsen replaces Paul Philipp as coach of the Luxembourg national football team.
- 9 November – SES Global is established, with SES Astra as its subsidiary.
- 12 November – SES Global completes its acquisition of GE Americom.
- 16 November – The section of the A7 motorway between Schoenfels and Schieren opens.
- 16 November – The construction of the A13 road, between Bettembourg and Schengen, is authorised.
- 29 November – Luxembourg ratifies the Kyoto Protocol, although does not deposit it until all other EU member are ready to do so.
- 31 December – André Lussi is dismissed as CEO of Clearstream.

=== Unknown date ===
- Unknown – Denis Robert and Ernest Backes release the book Révélation$, describing the Clearstream Affair as the 'greatest financial scandal in the Grand Duchy of Luxembourg'.

== Deaths ==
- 24 November – Mett Clemens, cyclist
