= 2002 in Luxembourg =

- Decades: 1980s; 1990s; 2000s; 2010s; 2020s
- See also: History of Luxembourg; List of years in Luxembourg

The following lists events that happened during 2002 in the Grand Duchy of Luxembourg.

== Incumbents ==
Position	Incumbent
Grand Duke	Henri
Prime Minister	Jean-Claude Juncker
Deputy Prime Minister	Lydie Polfer
President of the Chamber of Deputies	Jean Spautz
President of the Council of State	Marcel Sauber
Mayor of Luxembourg City	Paul Helminger

== Events ==
=== January – March ===
- 1 January – The Euro Currency officially became the legal tender for Luxembourg, along with the other European Union (EU) Eurozone member area countries, replacing the Luxembourgish franc by being introduced physically with the official launch of the currency coins and banknotes. Luxembourg entered a period where specifically both the Euro Currency and the Luxembourgish franc were in dual circulation until specifically 28 February.
- 28 January – The government signs a treaty with France, at Rémilly, agreeing to extend the TGV Est to Luxembourg City.
- 18 February – Arcelor is launched as an operating concern.
- 28 February – Luxembourg franc banknotes and coins cease to be legal tender.
- 29 March – SES launches its 3A satellite.

=== April – June ===
- 7 May – Jean-Claude Juncker delivers his eighth State of the Nation address.
- 24 May – FC Avenir Beggen win the Luxembourg Cup, beating F91 Dudelange 1–0 in the final.
- 2 June – Marcus Ljungqvist wins the 2002 Tour de Luxembourg, with Team Fakta picking up the team title.

=== July – September ===
- 7 July – Luxembourg City plays host to the grand départ of the 2002 Tour de France.
- 6 September – Utopia Group SA formed from the merger of Utopia SA and Dutch company Polyfilm BV.
- 13 September – The most southern section of the A7 motorway, between the Grünewald and Waldhof, opens.

=== October – December ===
- 6 November – Luxair Flight 9642 crashes near Niederanven, on the approach to Luxembourg-Findel. 20 of the 22 passengers and crew members die.
- 26 November – SES' 1K satellite fails to deploy properly after launch, requiring it to be deorbited. This is SES's first unintended loss.

== Deaths ==
- 4 February – Prince Sigvard, Duke of Uppland
- 24 April – Lucien Wercollier, sculptor
- 24 June – Pierre Werner, politician
- 6 November – Michel Majerus, artist
