= 2003 in Luxembourg =

- Decades: 1980s; 1990s; 2000s; 2010s; 2020s
- See also: History of Luxembourg; List of years in Luxembourg

The following lists events that happened during 2003 in the Grand Duchy of Luxembourg.

== Incumbents ==
Position	Incumbent
Grand Duke	Henri
Prime Minister	Jean-Claude Juncker
Deputy Prime Minister	Lydie Polfer
President of the Chamber of Deputies	Jean Spautz
President of the Council of State	Marcel Sauber (until 11 March); Pierre Mores (from 29 April)
Mayor of Luxembourg City	Paul Helminger

== Events ==
=== January – March ===
- 13 February – Albert Rodesch is appointed to the Council of State, replacing John Castegnaro, who resigned in January.
- 11 March – President of the Council of State Marcel Sauber resigns to take up the vacancy left in the Chamber of Deputies by the death of Willy Bourg on 21 February.

=== April – June ===
- 29 April – Lydie Polfer meets with the foreign ministers of Belgium, France, and Germany, who agree a framework for the introduction of the planned Common Foreign and Security Policy.
- 29 April – Pierre Mores is appointed President of the Council of State, replacing Marcel Sauber.
- 20 May – Jean-Claude Juncker delivers his ninth State of the Nation address.
- 28 May – Ady Jung is appointed to the Council of State, replacing Marcel Sauber, who resigned in March.
- 31 May – CS Grevenmacher win the Luxembourg Cup, beating FC Etzella Ettelbruck 1–0 in the final.
- 1 June – Thomas Voeckler wins the 2003 Tour de Luxembourg, with Quick-Step–Davitamon picking up the team title.
- 7 June – SES Americom launches its AMC-9 satellite: its first under SES ownership.

=== July – September ===
- 24 July – The eastern half of the A13 motorway (the collectrice du Sud), part of E29, is opened between Hellange and Schengen, including a 600-metre viaduct across the border to meet Germany's A8.
- 9 August – The 2003–04 season of the National Division kicks off.
- 12 August – The University of Luxembourg is founded.
- 22 August – Plans to extend France's LGV Est to Luxembourg City are formally approved by Luxembourg.
- 29 August – Skype is released.

=== October – December ===
- 10 October – The Luxembourgian Film Prizes are launched. The prize for Best Film is shared between J'ai toujours voulu etre une Sainte and L'homme au cigare.
- 13 October – Lydie Polfer, Dominique de Villepin, and Joschka Fischer inaugurate the Pierre Werner Institute in Luxembourg City.
- November – Edward Steichen's The Family of Man exhibition, at Clervaux, is added to UNESCO's 'Memory of the World' register.
- 11 December – Kim Kirchen is named Luxembourg's Sportsperson of the Year.

== Deaths ==
- 12 February – Ernest Arendt, Councillor of State
- 21 February – Willy Bourg, politician
- 1 April – Marcel Ernzer, cyclist
- 23 November – Johny Lahure, politician
