= 2004 in Luxembourg =

- Decades: 1980s; 1990s; 2000s; 2010s; 2020s
- See also: History of Luxembourg; List of years in Luxembourg

The following lists events that happened during 2004 in the Grand Duchy of Luxembourg.

== Incumbents ==
Position	Incumbent
Grand Duke	Henri
Prime Minister	Jean-Claude Juncker
Deputy Prime Minister	Lydie Polfer (until 31 July); Jean Asselborn (from 31 July)
President of the Chamber of Deputies	Jean Spautz (until 13 July); Jean Asselborn (13 July – 30 July); Lucien Weiler (from 30 July)
President of the Council of State	Pierre Mores
Mayor of Luxembourg City	Paul Helminger

== Events ==
=== January – March ===
- 5 February – SES Americom launches its AMC-10 satellite.

=== April – June ===
- 27 April – Jean-Claude Juncker delivers his tenth State of the Nation address.
- 16 May – The 2003-04 season of the National Division finishes, with Jeunesse Esch winning the title.
- 19 May – SES Americom launches its AMC-11 satellite.
- 22 May – F91 Dudelange win the Luxembourg Cup, beating FC Etzella Ettelbruck 3-1 after extra time in the final.
- 30 May – Maxime Monfort wins the 2004 Tour de Luxembourg, with Quick-Step–Davitamon picking up the team title.
- 13 June – Legislative and European elections are held. The CSV add five seats in the Chamber, mostly at the expense of the DP, and one in the European Parliament from the LSAP.

=== July – September ===
- 19 July – Ministers and ministerial briefs are reorganised in an attempt to hold together the coalition between the CSV and the DP.
- 21 July – Luxembourgish Wikipedia is launched.
- 31 July – Jean-Claude Juncker forms a new government, with Jean Asselborn as his deputy.
- 7 August – The 2004-05 season of the National Division kicks off.
- 27 September – Jorge Sampaio, President of Portugal, pays a state visit.

=== October – December ===
- 15 October – SES Americom launches its AMC-15 satellite.
- 15 October – Romain Nati is appointed to the Council of State, replacing Nicolas Schmit, who resigned in July.
- 19 November – The constitution is amended.
- 24 November – The wife and four children of Prince Jean are granted the titles of 'Prince(ss) of Nassau', replacing their titles of 'Count(ess)'.
- 30 November – The Luxembourg investigation into the Clearstream Affair is dropped under the statute of limitations.
- 17 December – SES Americom launches its AMC-16 satellite.
- 20 December – Guy Hellers replaces Allan Simonsen as coach of the Luxembourg national football team.
- 26 December – 3 Luxembourgers are among the victims of the 2004 Indian Ocean tsunami.

== Deaths ==
- 6 January – Nicolas Mosar, politician
- 1 July – Paul Beghin, politician and jurist
- 21 October – Jean Dondelinger, diplomat and politician
- 21 December – Prince Lennart, Duke of Småland
