= 2007 in Luxembourg =

- Decades: 1980s; 1990s; 2000s; 2010s; 2020s
- See also: History of Luxembourg; List of years in Luxembourg

The following lists events that happened during 2007 in the Grand Duchy of Luxembourg.

== Incumbents ==
Position	Incumbent
Grand Duke	Henri
Prime Minister	Jean-Claude Juncker
Deputy Prime Minister	Jean Asselborn
President of the Chamber of Deputies	Lucien Weiler
President of the Council of State	Pierre Mores (until 30 September); Alain Meyer (from 30 September)
Mayor of Luxembourg City	Paul Helminger

== Events ==
=== January – March ===
- 1 January – 2007 begins with Luxembourg City holding the position as European Capital of Culture.
- 1 January – Luxembourg's holding company regulations are terminated, having been found to be incompatible with the European common market. Existing companies will continue to benefit from the advantages of being domiciled in Luxembourg until 31 December 2010.
- 7 February – At football, Luxembourg defeats The Gambia 2-1: the national team's first victory since 1995.
- 12 February – Luxembourg-based oil pipeline manufacturer Tenaris agrees to buy American valve manufacturer Hydril for $2.2bn.
- 13 February – During a visit to Luxembourg, IAEA Director General Mohamed ElBaradei announces a breakthrough in the six-party talks over de-nuclearisation of the Korean Peninsula.
- 15 February – Luxembourg, RTL Group, and Bertelsmann renew their concessions contract, to expire in 2020. This guarantees the future of RTL Télé Lëtzebuerg, RTL's headquarters in Luxembourg, and RTL's broadcast frequencies.

=== April – June ===
- 9 May – Jean-Claude Juncker delivers his thirteenth State of the Nation address.
- 20 May – The 2006-07 season of the National Division finishes, with F91 Dudelange winning the title for a third successive season.
- 28 May – F91 Dudelange win the Luxembourg Cup, beating UN Käerjeng 97 2–1 in the final to complete a second consecutive Double.
- 3 June – Andy Schleck finishes second in the 2007 Giro d'Italia on his multi-stage debut, marking his breakthrough in professional cycling. He also won the Young rider classification in the process.
- 5 June – Luxembourg vetoes a Council of Ministers motion that would have reformed European Union VAT regulations and cost Luxembourg an estimated 1% of GDP in lost tax revenue.
- 8 June – Prime Minister Jean-Claude Juncker undergoes surgery to address a deterioration of a chronic digestive condition.
- 10 June – Regular service begins on the LGV Est, a new high-speed link connecting Luxembourg City to Paris.
- 10 June – Grégory Rast wins the 2007 Tour de Luxembourg, with Benfica picking up the team title.

=== July – September ===
- 30 September – Alain Meyer replaces Pierre Mores as President of the Council of State.

=== October – December ===
- 10 October – L'essentiel, a free daily newspaper, is launched across Luxembourg by Tamedia and Editpress.
- 27 November – Following L'essentiel, Point24 is launched by Saint-Paul Luxembourg.

== Deaths ==
- 26 August - Gaston Thorn, politician and Prime Minister
- 6 December – Jean Dupong, politician
