= 2000 in Luxembourg =

- Decades: 1980s; 1990s; 2000s; 2010s; 2020s
- See also: History of Luxembourg; List of years in Luxembourg

The following lists events that happened during 2000 in Luxembourg.

== Incumbents ==
Position	Incumbent
Grand Duke	Jean (until 7 October); Henri (from 7 October)
Prime Minister	Jean-Claude Juncker
Deputy Prime Minister	Lydie Polfer
President of the Chamber of Deputies	Jean Spautz
President of the Council of State	Raymond Kirsch (from 14 January)
Mayor of Luxembourg City	Paul Helminger

== Events ==
=== January ===
- 1 January – The Grand Ducal Police is formed from a merger of the Gendarmerie and the police service.
- 1 January – Clearstream is established in Luxembourg City.

=== March ===
- March – The Parliament of France reports on money laundering in Europe, dedicating much of its space to Luxembourg and the Clearstream Affair.

=== May ===
- 10 May – Jean-Claude Juncker delivers his sixth State of the Nation address.
- 26 May – Jeunesse Esch win the Luxembourg Cup, beating FC Mondercange 4–1 in the final.
- 31 May – In Wasserbillig, a Tunisian gunman takes 45 children and 7 adults hostage at a crèche. The following day, the gunman is shot and critically wounded by police. There are no other casualties.

=== June ===
- 11 June – Alberto Elli wins the 2000 Tour de Luxembourg, with Team Telekom picking up the team title.

=== September ===
- 12 September – Luxembourg signs an agreement with the European Space Agency allowing it to participate in the ARTES programme.
- 14 September – SES launches its Astra 2B satellite.

=== October ===
- 5 October – Luxembourg accedes to the UN Convention on the Law of the Sea.
- 7 October – Grand Duke Jean abdicates and is succeeded by his eldest son, Hereditary Grand Duke Henri.

=== December ===
- 19 December – SES launches its Astra 2D satellite.

== Births ==
- 26 May - Tali Golergant, singer

== Deaths ==
- 5 July – Jos Wohlfart, politician
