= 2009 in Luxembourg =

- Decades: 1980s; 1990s; 2000s; 2010s; 2020s
- See also: History of Luxembourg; List of years in Luxembourg

The following lists events that happened during 2009 in the Grand Duchy of Luxembourg.

== Incumbents ==
Position	Incumbent
Grand Duke	Henri
Prime Minister	Jean-Claude Juncker
Deputy Prime Minister	Jean Asselborn
President of the Chamber of Deputies	Lucien Weiler (until 7 June); Laurent Mosar (from 28 July)
President of the Council of State	Alain Meyer (until 17 November); Georges Schroeder (from 17 November)
Mayor of Luxembourg City	Paul Helminger

== Events ==
=== January – March ===
- 8 February – Fabienne Gaul replaces Marie-Thérèse Gantenbein-Koullen in the Chamber of Deputies, after Gantenbein-Koullen retires.
- 11 March – Patrick Santer resigns from the Chamber of Deputies.
- 12 March – After the confrontation of December 2008 over euthanasia, the constitution of Luxembourg is amended to change the Grand Duke's power as from 'promulgating' law to 'sanctioning' law: removing his veto.
- 13 March - Luxembourg announces that it will provide details of private bank clients to foreign tax authorities if 'concrete proof' of tax evasion is provided.
- 17 March – Following the constitutional amendment, the Chamber of Deputies votes 30–26 to legalise euthanasia. The Grand Duke refuses to sign the law, but no longer has the power to veto it.
- 17 March – Raymond Weydert replaces Patrick Santer in the Chamber of Deputies.

=== April – June ===
- 1 April – Luxembourg legalises euthanasia.
- 2 April – Luxembourg is included on a G-20 'grey list' of tax havens.
- 21 April – Jean-Claude Juncker delivers his fifteenth State of the Nation address.
- 27 April – Patrick Santer is appointed to the Council of State, replacing Victor Rod, who resigned on 7 March.
- 26 April – Andy Schleck wins the Liège–Bastogne–Liège in Belgium, marking the first victory of the classic by a cyclist from Luxembourg in 55 years.
- 12 May - ArcelorMittal's annual general meeting is marked by a rioting by up to 1,000 steel-workers, bused in from Belgium and France, in Place des Martyrs.
- 20 May - Luxembourg and the United States sign a tax treaty, pledging to exchange private bank client details upon request: the first Luxembourg has signed with an OECD country.
- 24 May – The 2008-09 season of the National Division finishes, with F91 Dudelange winning the title for a fifth successive season.
- 30 May – F91 Dudelange win the Luxembourg Cup, beating UN Käerjéng 97 5–0 in the final to complete the Double for the third time.
- 2 June - Luxembourg reports its first case of swine influenza in the ongoing pandemic.
- 7 June – Elections are held to the Chamber of Deputies and to the European Parliament. The CSV wins 26 seats of 60 in the Chamber and 3 of 6 in the European Parliament, strengthening its dominance.
- 7 June – Fränk Schleck wins the 2009 Tour de Luxembourg, with Team Saxo Bank picking up the team title. He is the first Luxembourger to win since 1983.
- 22 June - A protest by European milk farmers outside a Council of the European Union meeting in Luxembourg City ends in rioting.

=== July – September ===
- 23 July - The CSV and LSAP conclude a coalition agreement, forming a new government under Jean-Claude Juncker and Jean Asselborn.
- 26 July - The 2009 Tour de France concludes, with Luxembourger Andy Schleck in second place and his older brother Fränk in sixth.
- 28 July - Laurent Mosar is elected the new President of the Chamber, replacing Lucien Weiler.

=== October – December ===
- 11 November – Erna Hennicot-Schoepges is appointed to the Council of State, replacing Nico Edon, who resigned on 1 November.
- 17 November – Georges Schroeder is appointed as President of the Council of State, replacing Alain Meyer.

== Deaths ==
- 11 February - Yvonne Useldinger, politician and resistance leader
