= 1999 in Luxembourg =

- Decades: 1970s; 1980s; 1990s; 2000s; 2010s
- See also: History of Luxembourg; List of years in Luxembourg

The following is a list of events that happened in 1999 in the Grand Duchy of Luxembourg.

== Incumbents ==
Position	Incumbent
Grand Duke	Jean
Prime Minister	Jean-Claude Juncker
Deputy Prime Minister	Jacques Poos (until 7 August); Lydie Polfer (from 7 August)
President of the Chamber of Deputies	Jean Spautz
President of the Council of State	Paul Beghin
Mayor of Luxembourg City	Lydie Polfer; Paul Helminger (from 10 October)

== Events ==
=== January – March ===
- 1 January – The Euro currency officially entered circulation in the European Union (EU) Eurozone member area countries, replacing, among other currencies, the Luxembourgian franc. The Franc remained in circulation, but at a fixed exchange rate of 40.3399 to 1 Euro.
- 15 March – The Santer Commission, under the leadership of Luxembourger Jacques Santer, resigns in the face of corruption allegations.

=== April – June ===
- 29 April – Jean-Claude Juncker delivers his fifth State of the Nation address.
- 13 May – Jeunesse Esch win the Luxembourg Cup, beating FC Mondercange 3–0 in the final.
- 13 June – General and European elections are held. The LSAP lose four seats in the Chamber of Deputies, with the DP and ADR picking up five between them.
- 13 June – Belgium's Marc Wauters wins the 1999 Tour de Luxembourg.
- 16 June – SES launches its ninth satellite, Astra 1H.

=== July – September ===
- 7 August – Jean-Claude Juncker forms a new government, with Lydie Polfer as his deputy.
- 11 August – A total solar eclipse is visible in Luxembourg.
- 10 October – Communal elections are held.

=== October – December ===
- 24 December – Grand Duke Jean announces that he is to abdicate in favour of his eldest son, Hereditary Grand Duke Henri. No date is yet given.

== Deaths ==
- 11 February – Maggy Stein, sculptor
- 22 October - Laure Koster, musician and Olympian
