= 2005 in Luxembourg =

- Decades: 1980s; 1990s; 2000s; 2010s; 2020s
- See also: History of Luxembourg; List of years in Luxembourg

The following lists events that happened during 2005 in the Grand Duchy of Luxembourg.

== Incumbents ==
Position	Incumbent
Grand Duke	Henri
Prime Minister	Jean-Claude Juncker
Deputy Prime Minister	Jean Asselborn
President of the Chamber of Deputies	Lucien Weiler
President of the Council of State	Pierre Mores
Mayor of Luxembourg City	Paul Helminger

== Events ==
=== January – March ===
- 1 January – Luxembourg holds the rotating presidency of the Council of the European Union until 1 July 2005.
- 3 February – SES Americom launches its AMC-12 satellite.

=== April – June ===
- 8 April – Luxembourg ratifies the European Charter for Regional or Minority Languages.
- 14 April – A law is passed organising a referendum on the proposed EU constitution, to be held on 10 July 2005.
- 29 April - René Kollweter is appointed to the Council of State, replacing Claude Bichelet, who resigned on 7 April.
- 14 May – CS Pétange win the Luxembourg Cup, beating Cessange-Bracarenses FC 01 5–0 in the final.
- 29 May – The 2004-05 season of the National Division finishes, with F91 Dudelange winning the title.
- 3 June – Prime Minister Jean-Claude Juncker promises to resign if Luxembourgish voters reject the proposed EU constitution in the upcoming referendum.
- 5 June – László Bodrogi wins the 2005 Tour de Luxembourg, with Fassa Bortolo picking up the team title.
- 9 June – The Parc Naturel of the Our River is created.
- 27 June – The Philharmonie Luxembourg is opened in Luxembourg City.
- 28 June – At the first reading, the Chamber of Deputies approves the Treaty establishing a Constitution for Europe ahead of a scheduled referendum on 10 July.
- 30 June – Luxembourg joins the European Space Agency.

=== July – September ===
- 1 July – Luxembourg's six-month presidency of the Council of the European Union comes to a close.
- 10 July – The referendum on the ratification of the Treaty establishing a Constitution for Europe is accepted with 56.52% of the vote.
- 27 July – Cargolux announces its intention to buy ten Boeing 747-8s, with options on ten more.
- 7 August – The 2005-06 season of the National Division kicks off.
- 12 September – Skype accepts a takeover offer from eBay of €1.9bn in cash and a potential €1.5bn in earn out.
- 18 September – Kim Kirchen wins the 2005 Tour de Pologne.
- 23 September – Luxembourg's largest music venue, the Rockhal, is opened in Esch-sur-Alzette, in the south of the country.

=== October – December ===
- 2 October – Kim Clijsters wins the Fortis Championships Luxembourg, beating Anna-Lena Grönefeld 6-2 6–4 in the final. It is the first WTA Tier II event to be held in Luxembourg, having been Tier III the previous year.
- 3 October – EU Foreign Ministers meet in Luxembourg City and agree to open talks over Turkish accession to the EU. Turkish officials agree to their terms.
- 9 October – Communal elections are held.
- 12 October – Jean-Claude Juncker delivers a declaration on the political state of the country in place of his eleventh State of the Nation address, on account of Luxembourg's presidency of the Council of the European Union earlier in the year.
- 14 October – eBay completes its acquisition of Skype.
- 14 October – Luxembourg Film Prize for Best Film goes to Heim ins Reich.
- 14 November – At the launch of the Boeing 747-8, Cargolux is the larger of two launch customers (ahead of Nippon Cargo Airlines).
- 23 November – Arcelor announces offer to acquire Dofasco at C$56 per share.
- 25 November – Grand Duke Henri gives grand ducal assent to the law ratifying the Treaty establishing a Constitution for Europe, completing Luxembourg's ratification.
- 29 December – SES Americom launches its AMC-23 satellite.

== Deaths ==
- 10 January – Joséphine-Charlotte of Belgium
- 12 April – Joseph Brebsom, politician
- 16 July – Camillo Felgen, actor and singer
- 25 November —Norbert von Kunitzki, businessman and economist
- 6 December – Charly Gaul, cyclist
