= 2006 in Luxembourg =

- Decades: 1980s; 1990s; 2000s; 2010s; 2020s
- See also: History of Luxembourg; List of years in Luxembourg

The following lists events that happened during 2006 in the Grand Duchy of Luxembourg.

== Incumbents ==
Position	Incumbent
Grand Duke	Henri
Prime Minister	Jean-Claude Juncker
Deputy Prime Minister	Jean Asselborn
President of the Chamber of Deputies	Lucien Weiler
President of the Council of State	Pierre Mores
Mayor of Luxembourg City	Paul Helminger

== Events ==
=== January – March ===
- 1 January – The communes of Bastendorf and Fouhren merge to form the new commune of Tandel.
- 1 January – The communes of Kautenbach and Wilwerwiltz merge to form the new commune of Kiischpelt.
- 16 January – Arcelor makes Dofasco a takeover offer of C$71 per share
- 24 January – The board of Dofasco accepts Arcelor's takeover offer.
- 27 January – Mittal Steel Company unveils a bid for a takeover of Arcelor, at a price of €28.21 per share
- 27 January – Denis Robert is charged by a Luxembourg City magistrate for defamation and slander.
- 29 January – Arcelor's board of directors unanimously rejects Mittal's hostile takeover.
- 31 January – Jean-Claude Juncker announces his government's opposition to Mittal's bid for Arcelor.
- 20 February – Arcelor takes majority ownership of Dofasco.

=== April – June ===
- 2 April – The Action Committee for Democracy and Pensions Justice changes its name to 'Alternative Democratic Reform Party'.
- 7 April – Agnès Durdu is appointed to the Council of State, replacing Carlo Meintz, who resigned the previous May.
- 20 April – SES Astra launches its Astra 1KR satellite.
- 2 May – Jean-Claude Juncker delivers his twelfth State of the Nation address.
- 3 May – The European Under-17 Football Championship kicks off at Stade John Grün, in Mondorf-les-Bains. As hosts, Luxembourg qualifies automatically.
- 14 May – Russia defeats the Czech Republic 5–3 on penalties to win the European Under-17 Football Championship at Stade Josy Barthel, in Luxembourg City.
- 20 May – F91 Dudelange win the Luxembourg Cup, beating Jeunesse Esch 3–2 in the final.
- 25 May – Jean-Claude Juncker is awarded the Karlspreis for his dedication to the European Constitution.
- 26 May – Arcelor and Severstal sign a merger agreement, as Arcelor attempts to deter a takeover bid by Mittal Steel Company.
- 28 May – The 2005–06 season of the National Division finishes, with F91 Dudelange winning the title to complete the Double.
- 10 June – Hereditary Grand Duke Guillaume is appointed to the Council of State.
- 21 June – Severstal substantially improves its merger offer to Arcelor in face of improved terms offered by Mittal.
- 25 June – The board of Arcelor agrees to a merger with Mittal Steel Company to form ArcelorMittal. The final offer values each Arcelor share at €40.40.
- 30 June – Arcelor shareholders reject the merger with Severstal at an Extraordinary General Meeting.

=== July – September ===
- 1 July – Mudam is opened in Luxembourg City.
- 31 July – Luxembourg ratifies the Treaty of Accession for the accession of Bulgaria and Romania to the European Union.
- 1 August – Georges Wivenes is appointed to the Council of State, replacing Charles Ruppert, who resigned in January.
- 5 August – The 2006–07 season of the National Division kicks off.
- 29 September – Prince Louis marries Tessy Antony in Gilsdorf. Upon the marriage, Louis renounces all succession rights for himself and his descendants. Antony takes up the Grand Ducal Family's surname 'de Nassau' , but does not become a princess.

=== October – December ===
- 1 October – Ukrainian Alyona Bondarenko wins the singles tournament of the Fortis Championships Luxembourg, beating Francesca Schiavone 6-3 6–2 in the final. Schiavone wins the doubles tournament along with Květa Peschke.
- 11 October – A train crash on the Franco-Luxembourgian border kills 6 people and injuries a further 20.
- 15 October – Lucien Lux admits that the Chemins de Fer Luxembourgeois was responsible for the Zoufftgen train crash of 11 October.
- 24 November – Luxembourg ratifies the International Convention against Doping in Sport.
- 9 December – Luxembourg City's year as European Capital of Culture for 2007 is officially launched.
- 14 December – SES Global is renamed to 'SES'.
- 1 August – Marc Schaefer is appointed to the Council of State, replacing Jean-Pierre Sinner, who resigned in October.
- 20 December – ArcelorMittal agrees to buy Mexican steel-maker Sicartsa from Grupo Villacero for $1.4bn.

== Deaths ==
- 20 March – Nicolas Birtz, footballer and politician
- 31 August – Edy Hein, cyclist
