= 1996 in Luxembourg =

- Decades: 1970s; 1980s; 1990s; 2000s; 2010s
- See also: History of Luxembourg; List of years in Luxembourg

The following lists events that happened during 1996 in Luxembourg.

== Incumbents ==
- Grand Duke – Jean
- Prime Minister – Jean-Claude Juncker
- Deputy Prime Minister – Jacques Poos
- President of the Chamber of Deputies – Jean Spautz
- President of the Council of State – Paul Beghin
- Mayor of Luxembourg City – Lydie Polfer

== Events ==
=== April ===
- 8 April – SES launches its sixth satellite, Astra 1F.

=== May ===
- 25 May – Union Luxembourg win the Luxembourg Cup, beating Jeunesse Esch 3–1 in the final.

=== June ===
- 9 June – Italy's Alberto Elli wins the 1996 Tour de Luxembourg.
- June – National Museum of Natural History moves to its new premises in Grund, in Luxembourg City.

=== August ===
- August – The section of the A7 motorway between Erpeldange and Friedhaff opens.

=== September ===
- 23 September - The section of the A1 motorway between Irrgarten and Kirchberg opens, completing the motorway and also the south-eastern bypass of Luxembourg City.
