= 1994 in Luxembourg =

- Decades: 1970s; 1980s; 1990s; 2000s; 2010s
- See also: History of Luxembourg; List of years in Luxembourg

The following lists events that happened during 1994 in the Grand Duchy of Luxembourg.

== Incumbents ==
- Grand Duke – Jean
- Prime Minister – Jacques Santer
- Deputy Prime Minister – Jacques Poos
- President of the Chamber of Deputies – Erna Hennicot-Schoepges
- President of the Council of State – Jean Dupong (to 18 May) Paul Beghin
- Mayor of Luxembourg City – Lydie Polfer

== Events ==
=== January – March ===
- January - The section of the A13 motorway between Schifflange and Kayl opens.

=== April – June ===
- 20 May - The section of the A1 motorway between Croix de Gasperich and Irrgarten opens.
- 3 June - Sections of the A13 motorway between Sanem and Lankelz and Esch-sur-Alzette and Schifflange open.
- 12 June – Legislative and European elections are held. There is little change in the balance of power, although The Greens and ADR successfully consolidate their new-found positions.
- 13 June – Jacques Santer forms a new government, keeping Jacques Poos as his deputy.

=== July – September ===
- 15 July – Jacques Santer is designated as the successor to Jacques Delors as President of the European Commission, to take up the post on 23 January 1995.
- 24 September – Prince Guillaume marries Sibilla Sandra Weiller Torlonia.

=== October – December ===
- 1 November – SES launches its fourth satellite, Astra 1D.
- 19 December – The old town and fortifications of Luxembourg City are made a UNESCO World Heritage Site.

=== Unknown ===
- Unknown – The Netherlands' Frans Maassen wins the 1994 Tour de Luxembourg.

== Deaths ==
- 14 January – Jean Goldschmit, cyclist
- 19 July – Émile Schaus, politician and writer
- 1 September – Father Jean Bernard, writer and clergyman
- 26 October - Emile Kirscht, painter
