= 1998 in Luxembourg =

- Years in Luxembourg: 1995 1996 1997 1998 1999 2000 2001
- Centuries: 19th century · 20th century · 21st century
- Decades: 1960s 1970s 1980s 1990s 2000s 2010s 2020s
- Years: 1995 1996 1997 1998 1999 2000 2001

The following lists events that happened during 1998 in the Grand Duchy of Luxembourg.

== Incumbents ==
Position	Incumbent
Grand Duke	Jean
Prime Minister	Jean-Claude Juncker
Deputy Prime Minister	Jacques Poos
President of the Chamber of Deputies	Jean Spautz
President of the Council of State	Paul Beghin
Mayor of Luxembourg City	Lydie Polfer

== Events ==
=== January – March ===
- 30 January – Marc Fischbach and Johny Lahure resign from the government, and are replaced by Luc Frieden and Georges Wohlfart.

=== April – June ===
- 28 April – Grand Duke Jean declares his eldest son, Hereditary Grand Duke Henri, to be his Lieutenant Representative.
- 23 May – CS Grevenmacher win the Luxembourg Cup, beating FC Avenir Beggen 2–0 in the final.
- 28-29 May – NATO Foreign Ministers meet in Luxembourg City.
- 1 June – The Banque Centrale du Luxembourg is established.
- 14 June – The United States' Lance Armstrong wins the 1998 Tour de Luxembourg.

=== July – September ===
- 30 August – SES launches its eighth satellite, Astra 2A.
- 27 September – The 1998 Luxembourg Grand Prix is held: not in Luxembourg, but at the Nürburgring, in the nearby German town of Nürburg.

=== October – December ===
- 5 November – The Saint Esprit Tunnel is officially renamed the 'René Konen Tunnel' after former Democratic Party politician René Konen.
- 31 December – The exchange rate between the Luxembourgian franc and the ECU at close of trading is 40.3399. This rate is then fixed as the level at which Luxembourg would join the Euro.

== Deaths ==
- 28 February – Elsy Jacobs, cyclist
- 30 September – Émile Krieps, politician and resistance leader
