= 1995 in Luxembourg =

- Decades: 1970s; 1980s; 1990s; 2000s; 2010s
- See also: History of Luxembourg; List of years in Luxembourg

The following lists events that happened during 1995 in the Grand Duchy of Luxembourg.

== Incumbents ==
- Grand Duke – Jean
- Prime Minister – Jacques Santer (to 20 January) Jean-Claude Juncker
- Deputy Prime Minister – Jacques Poos
- President of the Chamber of Deputies – Erna Hennicot-Schoepges
  Jean Spautz
- President of the Council of State – Paul Beghin
- Mayor of Luxembourg City – Lydie Polfer

== Events ==
=== January – March ===
- 1 January – Luxembourg City becomes European City of Culture for 1995.
- 20 January – Jacques Santer resigns his position as Prime Minister. He take up his new post as President of the European Commission three days later. Jean-Claude Juncker takes Santer's place.
- 26 January – Jean-Claude Juncker forms a new government, with Jacques Poos as his deputy.
- 22 February – At football, Luxembourg beats Malta 1–0, recording Luxembourg's first victory in international football since 1980.
- 26 March – The Schengen Agreement comes into force.

=== April – June ===
- 25 May – CS Grevenmacher and Jeunesse Esch draw in the final of the Luxembourg Cup, 1-1 after extra time, forcing the game to go to a replay.
- 7 June – The national football team shocks the Czech Republic by winning 1–0 in the qualifying round of the 1996 European Championship: a competition in which the Czechs would reach the final.
- 11 June – CS Grevenmacher win the Luxembourg Cup, beating Jeunesse Esch 3–2 in the replay.
- 11 June – Switzerland's Rolf Järmann wins the 1995 Tour de Luxembourg.
- 21 June - The A3 motorway extension from Croix de Gasperich to Bonnevoie, in Luxembourg City, opens.
- July – The A13 motorway extension from Biff to Rodange, bypassing Pétange, opens.

=== July – September ===
- 31 July – A law is passed giving the go-ahead to the construction of the Liaison avec le Sarre, extending the A13 to the German border.
- 6 September – The national football team again beats Malta 1–0. This would be the last Luxembourgian international victory until 2007.
- 11 September - Raid on warehouse results in the largest bust of an illegal LSD producing factory in Europe to date.

=== October – December ===
- 13 October – The National Literature Centre opens in Mersch.
- 19 October – SES launches its fifth satellite, Astra 1E.

== Deaths ==
- 18 January – Roger Gilson, cyclist
- 2 May – Albert Bousser, politician
