= 1993 in Luxembourg =

- Decades: 1970s; 1980s; 1990s; 2000s; 2010s
- See also: History of Luxembourg; List of years in Luxembourg

The following lists events that happened during 1993 in the Grand Duchy of Luxembourg.

== Incumbents ==
Position	Incumbent
Grand Duke	Jean
Prime Minister	Jacques Santer
Deputy Prime Minister	Jacques Poos
President of the Chamber of Deputies	Erna Hennicot-Schoepges
President of the Council of State	Jean Dupong
Mayor of Luxembourg City	Lydie Polfer

== Events ==
=== April – June ===
- 12 May – SES launches its third satellite, Astra 1C.
- 15 May – Representing Luxembourg, Modern Times finish twentieth in the Eurovision Song Contest 1993 with the song Donne-moi une chance de te dire. This was Luxembourg's last entry at the contest until 2024.

=== October – December ===
- 8 October – The satirical newspaper Den Neie Feierkrop is launched.
- 10 October – Communal elections are held.
- 1 November – The Maastricht Treaty comes into force, creating the European Union.
- Unknown – Italy's Maximilian Sciandri wins the 1993 Tour de Luxembourg.

== Deaths ==
- 14 January – Victor Abens, politician
- 4 March – Théo Kerg, artist
- 28 October – Grégoire Leisen, cyclist
