= 1997 in Luxembourg =

- Years in Luxembourg: 1994 1995 1996 1997 1998 1999 2000
- Centuries: 19th century · 20th century · 21st century
- Decades: 1960s 1970s 1980s 1990s 2000s 2010s 2020s
- Years: 1994 1995 1996 1997 1998 1999 2000

The following lists events that happened during 1997 in the Grand Duchy of Luxembourg.

== Incumbents ==
Position	Incumbent
Grand Duke	Jean
Prime Minister	Jean-Claude Juncker
Deputy Prime Minister	Jacques Poos
President of the Chamber of Deputies	Jean Spautz
President of the Council of State	Paul Beghin
Mayor of Luxembourg City	Lydie Polfer

== Events ==
=== April – June ===
- 17 April – The weekly newspaper Le Jeudi is launched by Editpress.
- 17 May – The Compagnie Grand-Ducale d'Électricité du Luxembourg is renamed 'Cegedel'.
- 31 May – Jeunesse Esch win the Luxembourg Cup, beating Union Luxembourg 2–0 in the final.
- 15 June – Belgium's Frank Vandenbroucke wins the 1997 Tour de Luxembourg.

=== July – September ===
- 1 July – Luxembourg assumes the rotating Presidency of the Council of the European Union for the following six months.
- 28 September – The first Luxembourg Grand Prix is held: not in Luxembourg, but at the Nürburgring, in the nearby German town of Nürburg. Jacques Villeneuve wins the race.

=== October – December ===
- 9 October – Luxair places an order for two Embraer ERJ 145 regional jets following the airline's decision to create an all-jet fleet.
- 2 December – SES launches its seventh satellite, Astra 1G.

== Births ==
- 30 July – Jessica Berscheid, footballer

== Deaths ==
- 14 March – Nicolas Morn, cyclist
- 8 July – Joseph Probst, artist
- 5 December – Jim Kirchen, cyclist
