= Hunsdorf =

Town in Luxembourg

Coordinates: 49°42′N 6°08′E

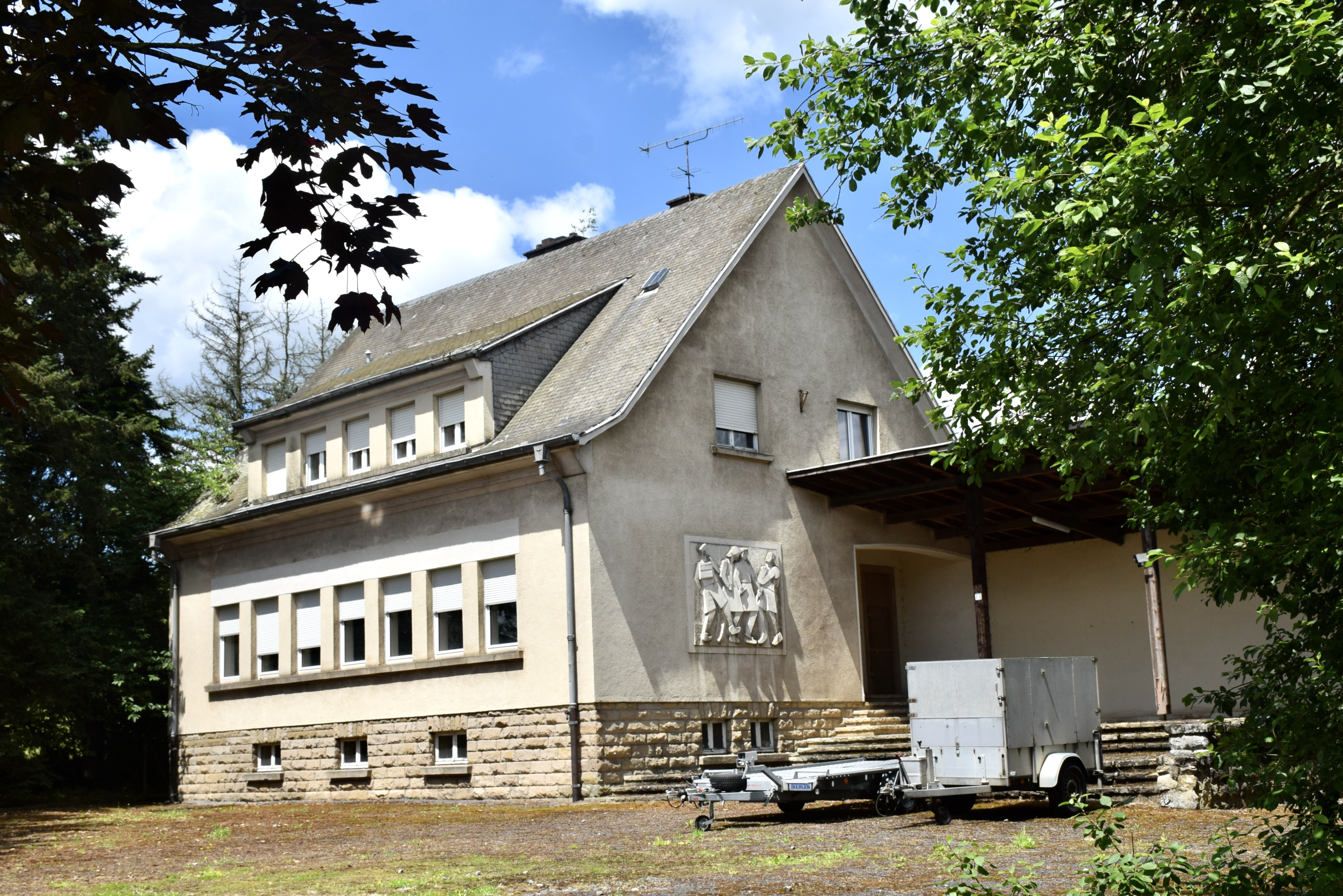

Hunsdorf (German pronunciation: [ˈhʊnsdɔʁf]; Luxembourgish: Hënsdref) is a small town in the commune of Lorentzweiler, in central Luxembourg. As of September 2026, the town has a population of 634.
