= Schoenfels Castle =

Castle in Luxembourg

Coordinates: 49°43′N 6°06′E

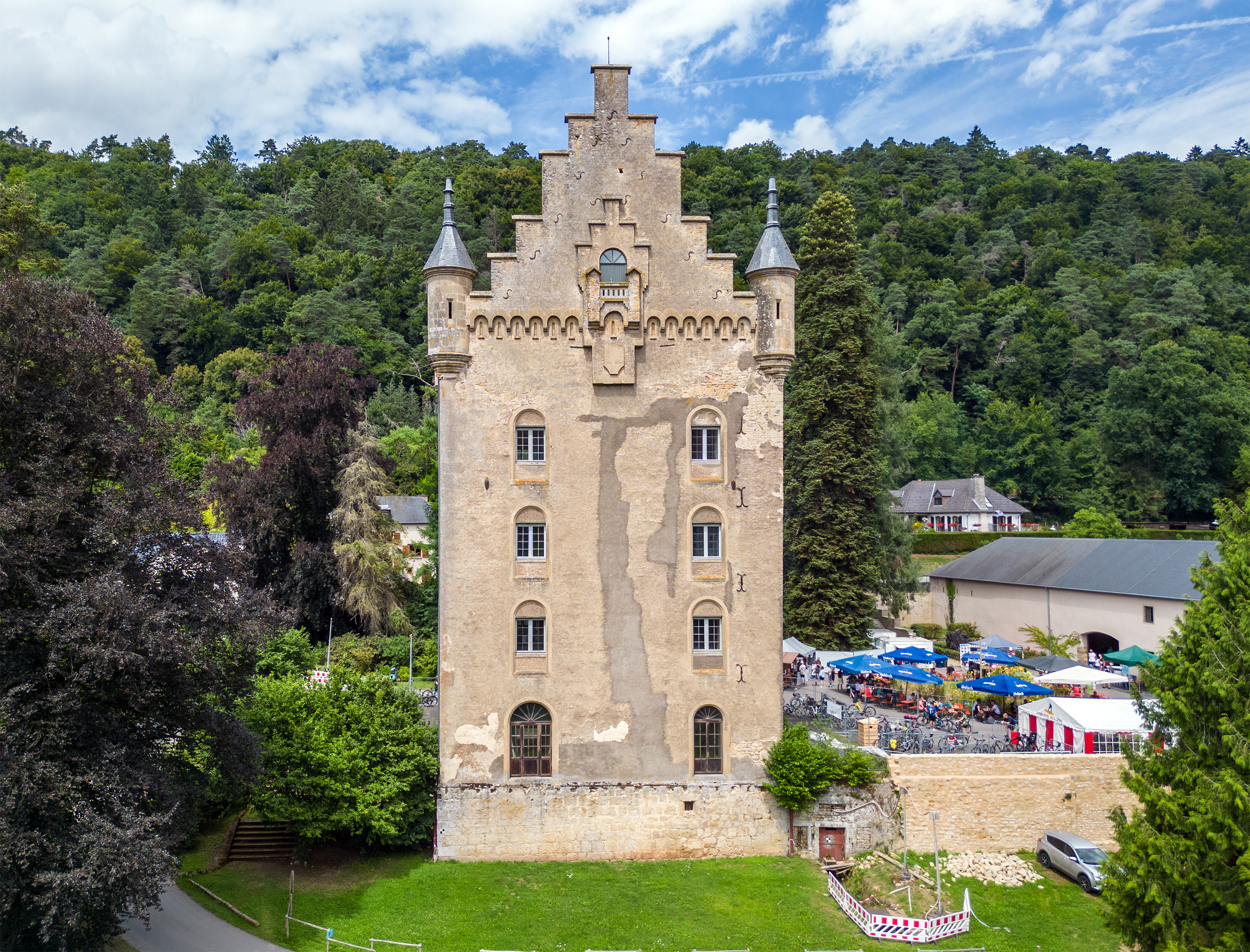
Schoenfels Castle

Schoenfels Castle (Luxembourgish: Schlass Schëndels; French: Château de Schoenfels), with a history dating back to the 12th century, is one of the castles belonging to the Valley of the Seven Castles in central Luxembourg. Located in the village of Schoenfels in the Mamer Valley between Kopstal and Mersch, it now belongs to the State of Luxembourg.

== History ==
=== Early history ===
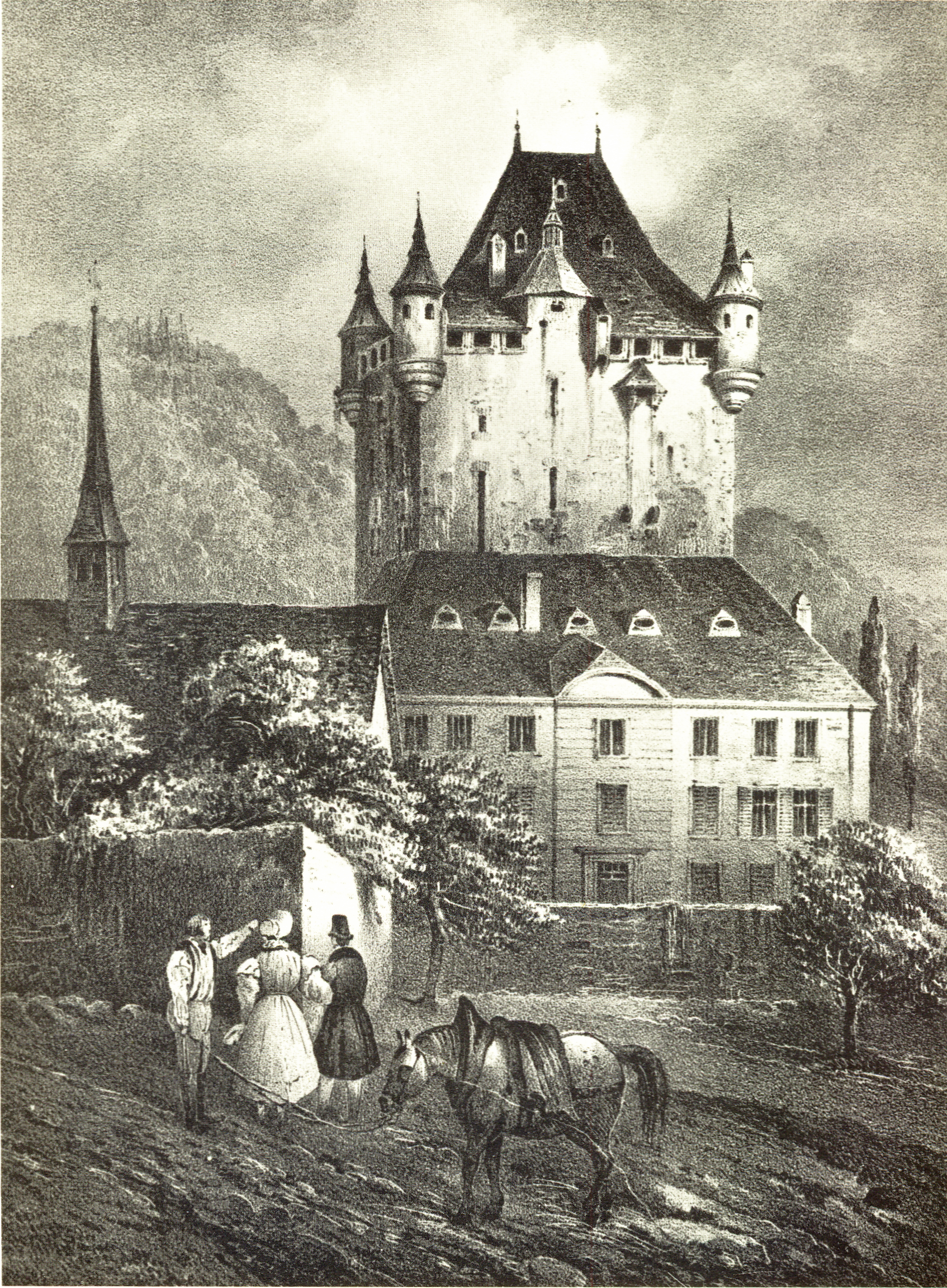
Drawing by Nicolas Liez (1834) with the now demolished manor house

The castle appears to have been built by Friedrich of Schonevels in 1292. Through marriage, it subsequently belonged to the families of Ansembourg and Sanem. In the 16th century, Henri Schloeder of Lachen became the owner and the Lord of Schoenfels and Busbach. His arms are to found on the keep. In 1683, the French destroyed the castle's defences and in 1690 the castle and the village were burnt down after a dispute between Theodor von Neunheuser and the Lord of Brandenbourg. In 1759, Pierre-François de Gaillot de Genouillac became Lord of Schoenfels after marrying Marie-Catherine de Neunheuser. In 1813, his son, François-Romain de Gaillot, sold the castle to Jean-Baptiste Thorn-Suttor, governor of the Province of Luxembourg during the Belgian period (1831-1839). The Belgian senator Jacques Engler bought the castle in 1840 and left it to his son-in-law Baron Auguste Goethals who built a residence beside the keep. In 1948, the Luxembourgish industrialist Camille Weiss bought the property but sold it in 1971 to the Luxembourg State. The new residence was demolished in 1976.

=== The castle today ===
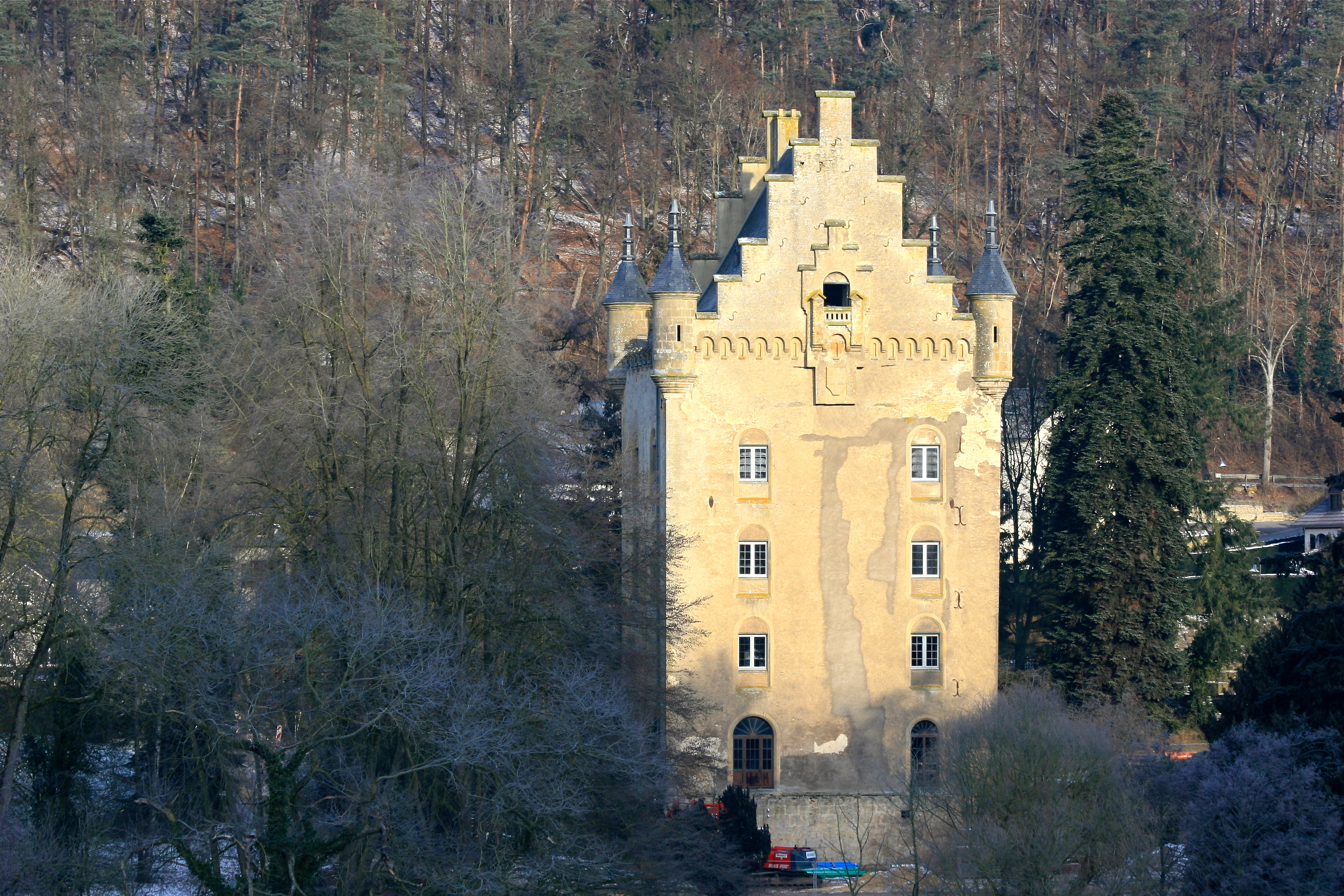
Schoenfels Castle, from across the Mamer river

On completing its current restoration of the keep, the State intends to open a visitor centre for the Mamer Valley Nature Reserve and offices for the Forestry Administration. In the meantime, the castle is not open to the public.
