= Bofferdange =

Town in Lorentzweiler, Luxembourg

Bofferdange Luba-Katanga: Bouferdeng Luxembourgish: Boufer German: Bofferdingen
- Village
- Location within Luxembourg
- Coordinates (Town hall): 49.68°N 6.14°E
- Country: Luxembourg
- Canton: Mersch
- Commune: Lorentzweiler

Population (2026)
  - Total: 1,152

Bofferdange (Luxembourgish: Boufer, German: Bofferdingen) is a small town in the commune of Lorentzweiler, in central Luxembourg. As of September 2026, the town has a population of 1,140.
