= Helmdange =

Town in Luxembourg

Coordinates: 49°41′N 6°09′E

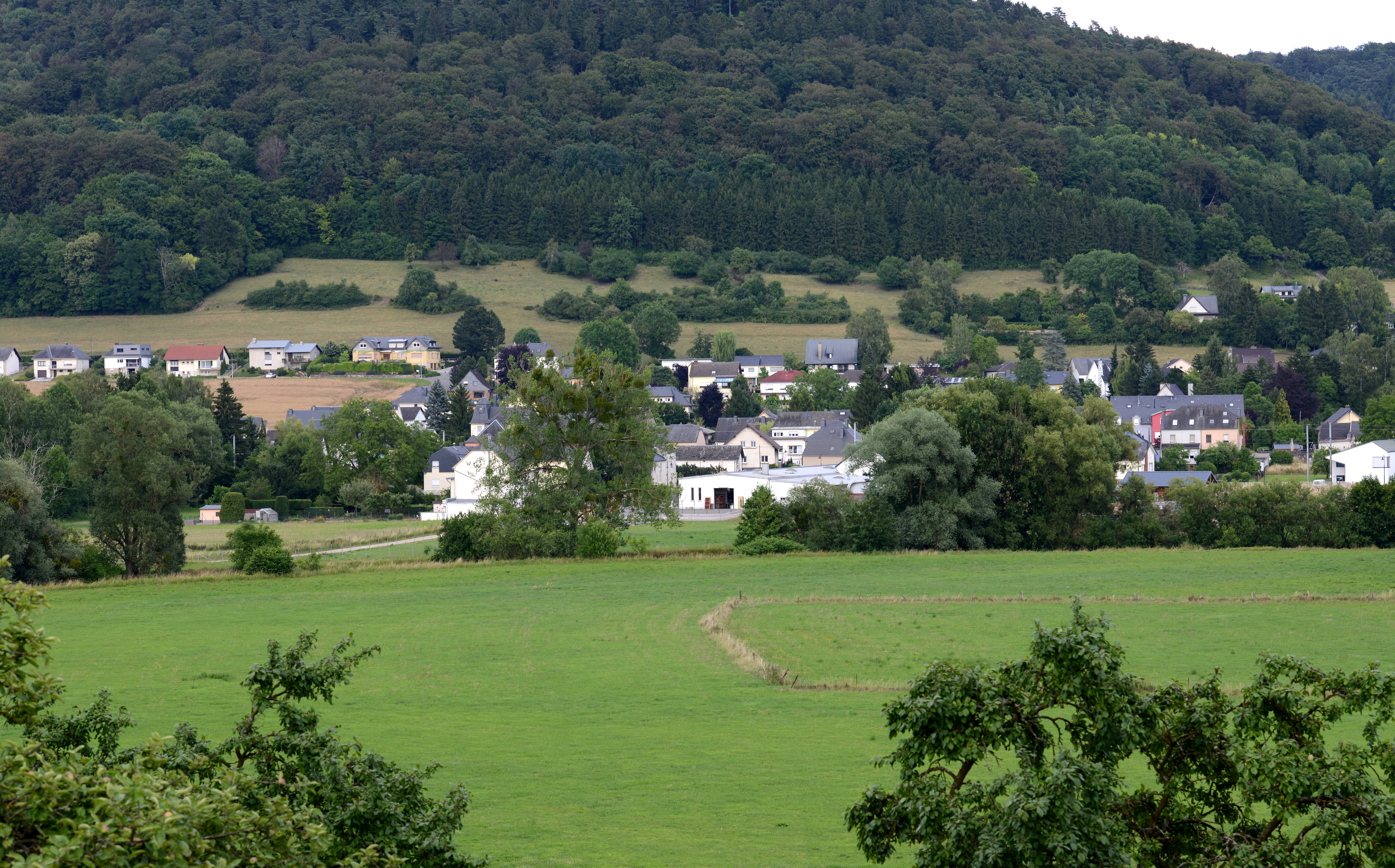
View of Helmdange

Helmdange (French pronunciation: [ɛlmdɑ̃ʒ]; Luxembourgish: Hielem, German: Helmdingen [ˈhɛlmdɪŋən]) is a small town in the commune of Lorentzweiler, in central Luxembourg. As of September 2026, the town has a population of 748.
