= Lorentzweiler railway station =

Railway station in Luxembourg

Lorentzweiler Luerenzweiler
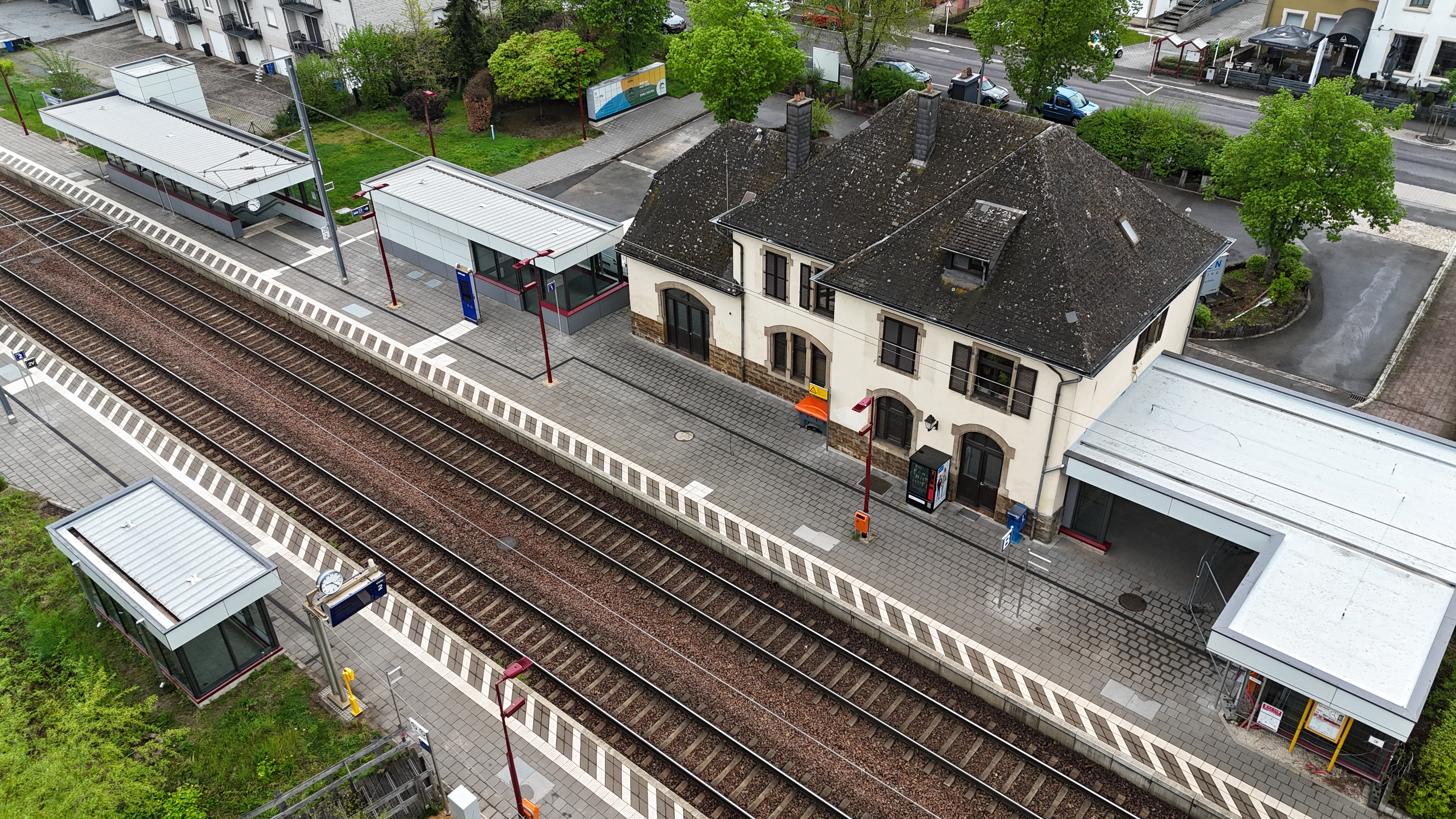

General information
- Location: Route de Luxembourg; L-7205 Lorentzweiler
- Coordinates: 49°41′55″N 06°08′24″E
- Operator: CFL
- Line: CFL Line 10
- Platforms: 2
- Tracks: 2
- Train operators: CFL
- Connections: RGTR bus lines 110, 111, 235 and 292

Construction
- Parking: 144 parking spaces
- Cycle facilities: 32 mBox cycle spaces

Other information
- Website: CFL

History
- Opened: 21 July 1862

Passengers
- 2022: 151,243
- Rank: 34 of 60

Services
Preceding station	CFL	Following station
Heisdorf towards Luxembourg	Line 10	Lintgen towards Diekirch
Location

Lorentzweiler railway station (Luxembourgish: Gare Luerenzweiler, French: Gare de Lorentzweiler, German: Bahnhof Lorentzweiler) is a railway station serving Lorentzweiler, in central Luxembourg. It is operated by Chemins de Fer Luxembourgeois, the state-owned railway company.

The station is situated on Line 10, which connects Luxembourg City to the centre and north of the country.
