= Frank Wagener =

Chairman of boards of directors of Luxembourg Stock Exchange

Frank Wagener (born 15 November 1952) in Luxembourg city in Luxembourg and is the chairman of the boards of directors of the Luxembourg Stock Exchange (Bourse de Luxembourg) and of Banque Internationale à Luxembourg.

== Career ==
He began his career in the then-named Banque Internationale à Luxembourg in 1978. In 1993, he became a member of the executive board and in 2006 chairman of the executive board. On 29 March 2011, he became chairman of the board of directors.

He joined the board of directors of the Luxembourg Stock Exchange in 2006 and he was appointed second vice-chairman in 2007. On 20 April 2011, he was appointed chairman of the board of directors.

== Personal ==
Frank Wagener studied law at the University of Liège, Belgium and later studied at the Harvard Business School. He sits on the board of the Grand Duke Henri and the Grand Duchess Maria Teresa Foundation.

== Footnotes ==
Business positions
Preceded by Raymond Kirsch	Chairman Luxembourg Stock Exchange; 2011–present	Succeeded by Incumbent
