= Den Neie Feierkrop =

- Type: Satirical weekly newspaper
- Founded: 8 October 1993
- Language: German and French
- Circulation: 11,000 (2004)

Den Neie Feierkrop (Luxembourgish pronunciation: [dən ˈnɑɪ̯ə ˈfɑɪ̯ɐkʀop]; lit. 'The New Fire Iron') is a satirical weekly newspaper published in Luxembourg.
