= Patrick Santer =

Luxembourgish lawyer and politician

Patrick Santer (born 16 August 1970 in Luxembourg City) is a Luxembourgish lawyer and politician for the Christian Social People's Party (CSV).

Santer stood for the Chamber of Deputies in the Centre constituency in the 1999 election, finishing tenth on the CSV list, with six elected. However, this qualified him to replace Astrid Lulling, who was herself appointed to take the place of Viviane Reding as Member of the European Parliament after Reding was appointed European Commissioner. He consequently sat in the Chamber from 12 October 1999 to 5 June 2004. He won the ninth-most votes on the CSV list in the 2004 election, with eight elected. Santer took up a seat when three of those that were elected above him were appointed government ministers. Hence, he sat from 3 August 2004 until 11 March 2009, when he resigned.

He is the son of Jacques Santer, former Prime Minister (1984 – 1995) and President of the European Commission (1995 – 1999).
