= Point24 =

- Type: Free daily newspaper
- Format: Compact
- Owner: Saint-Paul Luxembourg
- Publisher: Saint-Paul Luxembourg
- Founded: 27 November 2007
- Language: French, German and Portuguese
- Headquarters: 2 rue Christophe Plantin, L-2988 Luxembourg City
- Website: www.point24.lu

Point24 is a free daily newspaper in Luxembourg.

== History and profile ==
Point24 was established in 2007. It is published by Saint-Paul Luxembourg. Originally published exclusively in French, like the rival freesheet L'essentiel, Point24 then was divided, with a German front page and a French one, opposite to each other. Later on the 2 versions were divided into 2 separate newspapers, in a smaller format, magazine like. Finally in February 2011 a Portuguese version of the newspaper, with editions on Thursdays and Tuesdays, was launched.
