= Émile Schaus =

Luxembourgish politician and writer

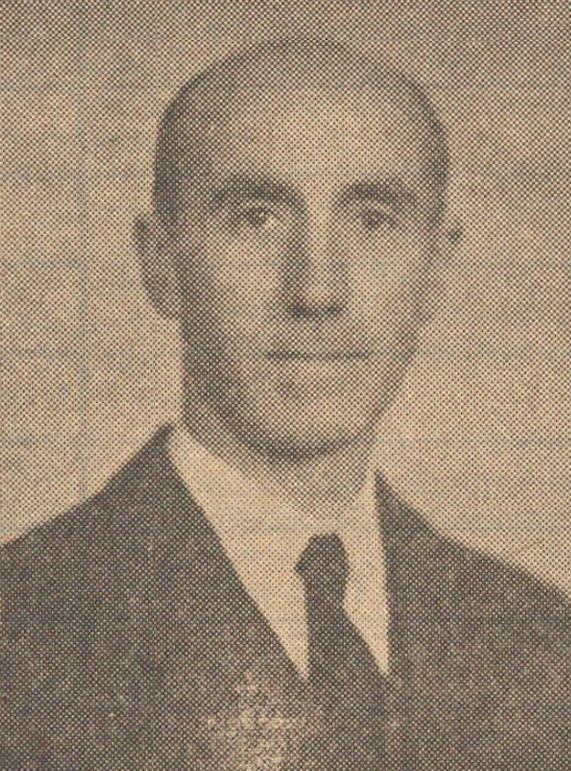
Émile Schaus c. 1951

Émile Schaus (12 February 1903 – 19 July 1994) was a Luxembourgish politician and writer.

After studying in Paris, Munich and Berlin, Schaus became a literature teacher, first in Diekirch, later at the Athénée in Luxembourg City. He was the Director of the Teachers’ Normal School at the time of his deportation. Due to his political views, during the German occupation he was deported by the Nazis to the concentrations camps of Wittlich, then Hinzert, then Dachau.

Schaus was released in 1942. In 1945 for a few months he was political editor of the Luxemburger Wort and in the same year he was appointed head teacher of the Ecole Normale, which he remained until 1959.

Émile Schaus was one of the founders of the AFP and until 1951 was its general secretary.

The beginning of his political career was the communal elections in 1952. Schaus was elected to the commune council, and in became deputy mayor for the CSV. One year later he was Minister for Agriculture, Education, Population and Family in the government of Pierre Werner. From 1964 he was a member of the Chamber of Deputies, the Luxembourgish representative in the Council of Europe, and finally a member of the European Parliament. In 1968 he retired from politics, and took advantage of this time to write.

He authored a variety of books: war memoirs, local history, children's literature such as Paul und Zorro or novels such as Marianne Bourkels. He had also previously written some works before his retirement, such as Aus den Memoiren eines Douaniers in 1946.

== Publications ==
- Auf der Galeere. Ein Kriegsroman, which appeared relatively late in 1982, was Schaus' account of the German occupation. This autobiographical roman à clef, tells of the life of Schaus' hero Tony Bourkels, a "good Luxembourger," under the German occupation.
- Schne'g. Eine Katzengeschichte, is a war novel, which portrays the everyday life of a Luxembourg City family in the early years of the war, entwined with the fairy-tale life of a cat.
- Aus den Memoiren eines Douaniers was Schaus' second novel.
