= Fridhaff =

Hamlet in Diekirch, Luxembourg

Coordinates: 49.8899°N 6.1353°E

Fridhaff is a hamlet in Diekirch, Luxembourg.

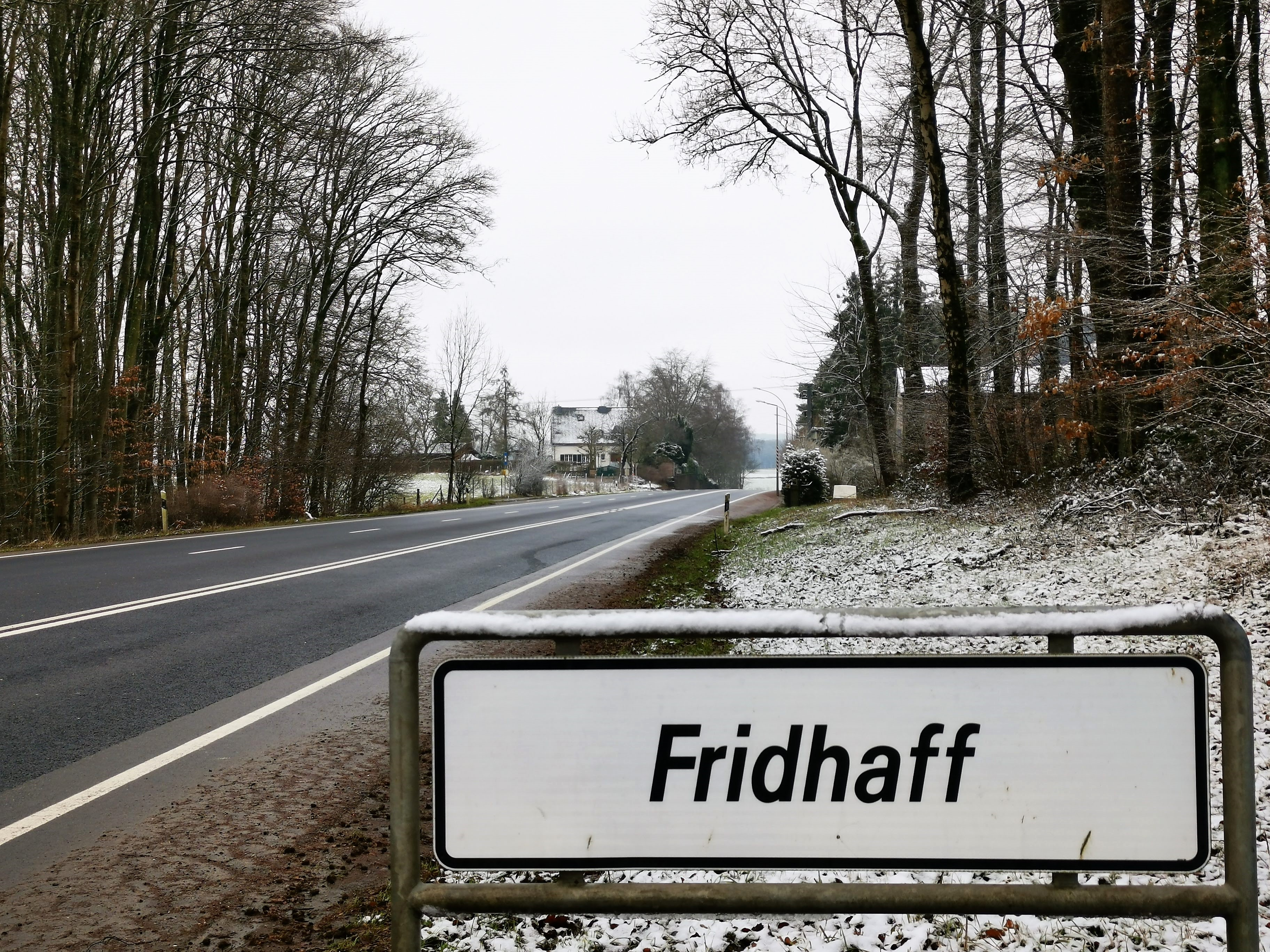

In 2010 plans for a commercial and industrial zone, the ZANO (Zone d'activités économiques Nordstad), have begun.

In the Hooldär forest east of Fridhaff are remnants of World War II foxholes, as well as a pedagogical honey centre.
