= Waldhof, Luxembourg =

Coordinates: 49°39′25″N 6°11′17″E

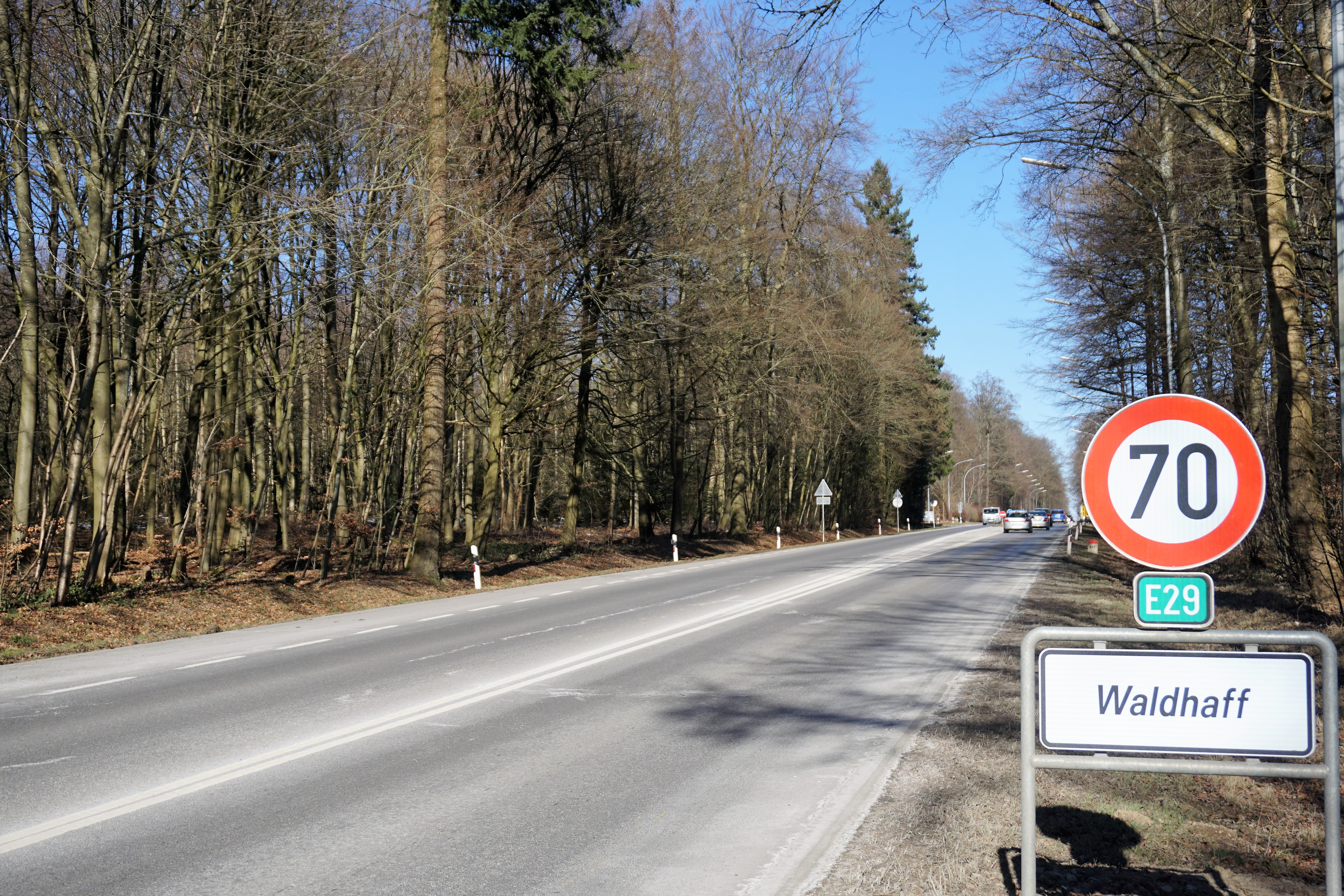
Entrance to Waldhof

Waldhof (German pronunciation: [ˈvaltˌhoːf]; Luxembourgish: Waldhaff) is a hamlet in the commune of Niederanven, in central Luxembourg. As of 2024, the hamlet had a population of two inhabitants.

Near Waldhof is the intersection between the A7 motorway and the Route d'Echternach (part of the E29 European route).

It is the location of a Luxembourg Army munitions depot.
