= Raymond Kirsch =

Raymond Kirsch (18 January 1942 - 11 March 2013) was a Luxembourgish businessman, economist, and administrator. He was the chairman of the Luxembourg Stock Exchange, from 1 February 2004. to 20 April 2011. Kirsch had previously sat as administrator of the Luxembourg Stock Exchange since 1990, and vice-chairman since 1993, and had also been the Director-General of the Banque et Caisse d'Épargne de l'État (1989 – 2004).

Kirsch was President of the Council of State for a single term, from 14 January 2000 to 13 January 2001.

== Footnotes ==
Political offices
Preceded by Paul Beghin	President of the Council of State; 2000 – 2001	Succeeded by Marcel Sauber
Business positions
Preceded by Jean Krier	Chair of the Luxembourg Stock Exchange; 2004 – 2011	Succeeded by Frank Wagener
