= Schoenfels =

Village in Luxembourg

Coordinates: 49°43′N 6°06′E

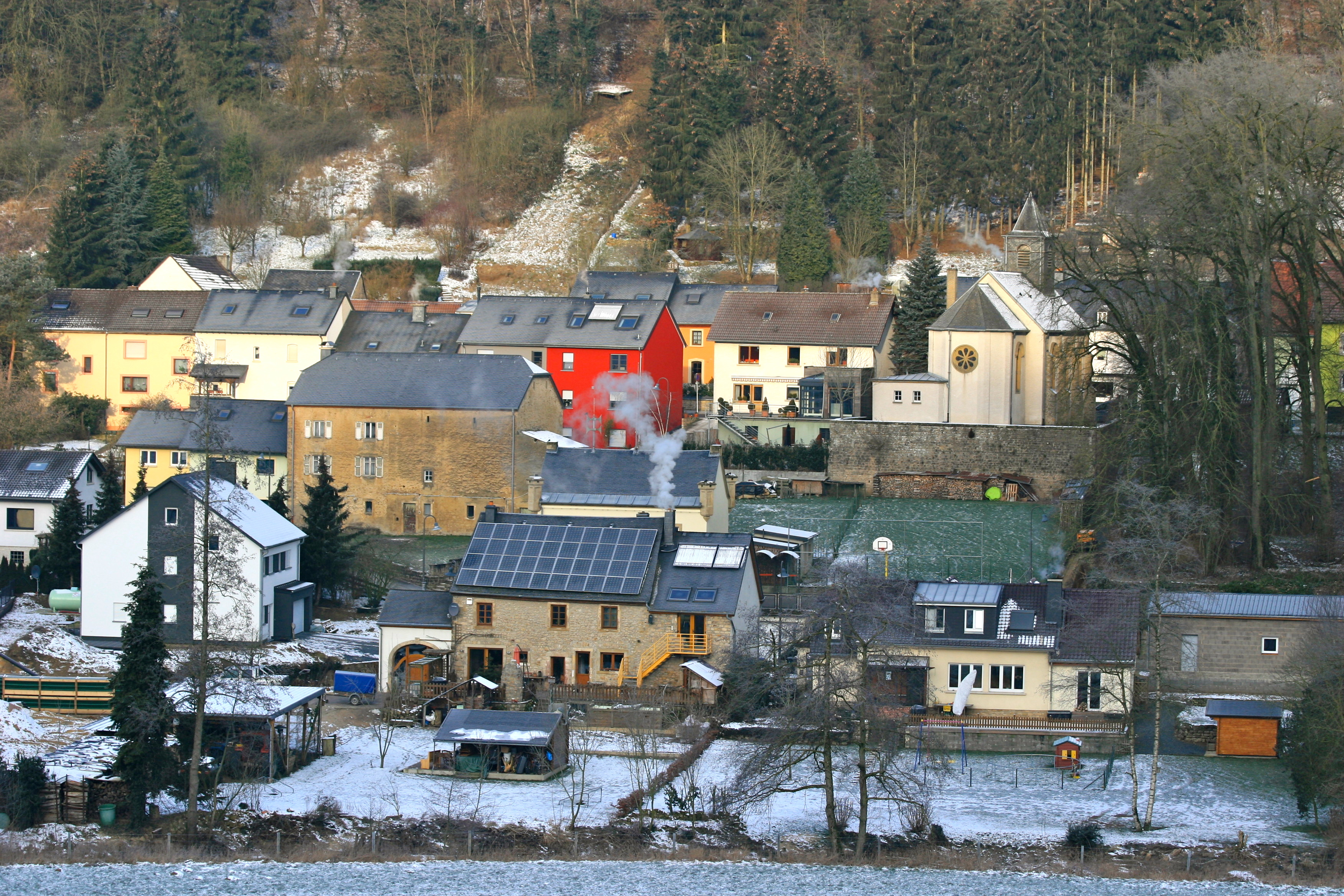
View of Schoenfels village

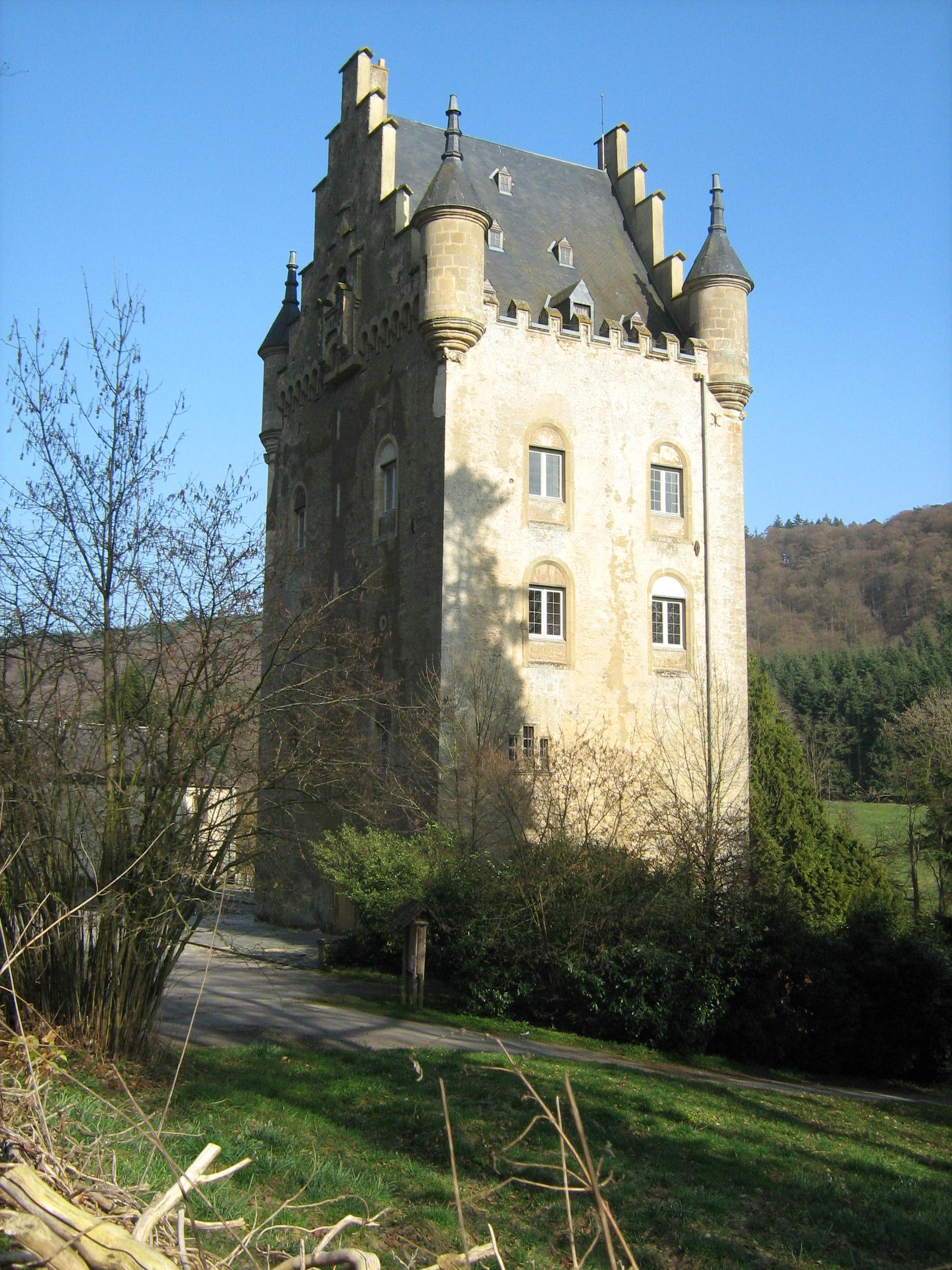
Schoenfels Castle

Schoenfels (Luxembourgish: Schëndels) is a village in the commune of Mersch, in central Luxembourg. As of September 2026, the village has a population of 242. It is the location of Junction 3 of the A7 motorway, which goes from Luxembourg City to Clervaux. It is notable for Schoenfels Castle.

== History ==
The hamlet of Schoenfels is first mentioned by the name of Scindalasheim in a deed of 846 as a gift by Bishop Hetto of Trier to Abbot Marcuardus of Prüm.
