= Lorentzweiler =

Lorentzweiler Luerenzweiler
- Commune
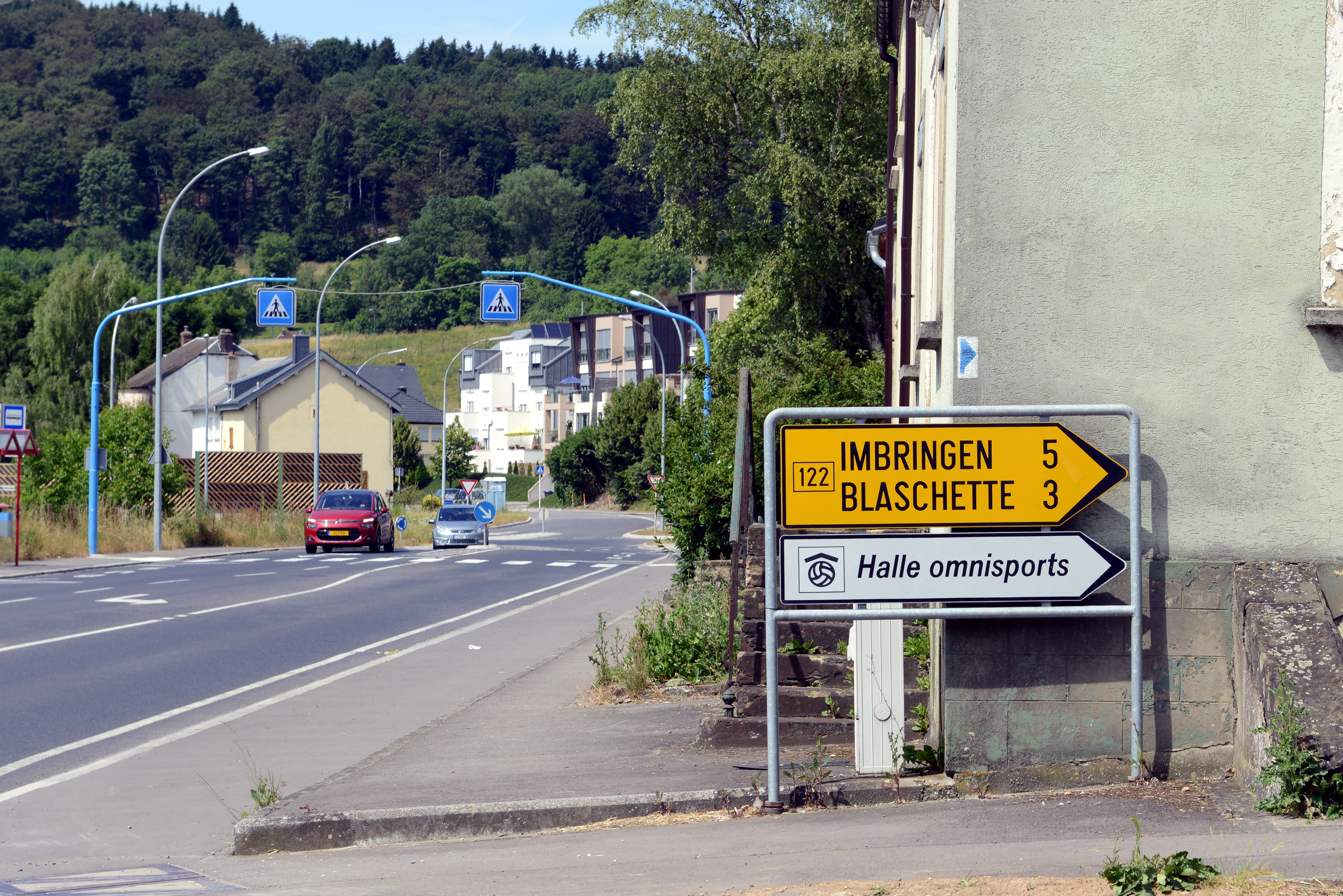

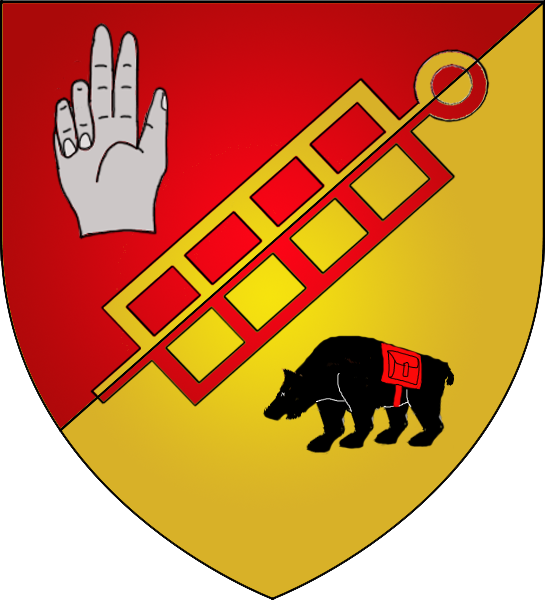
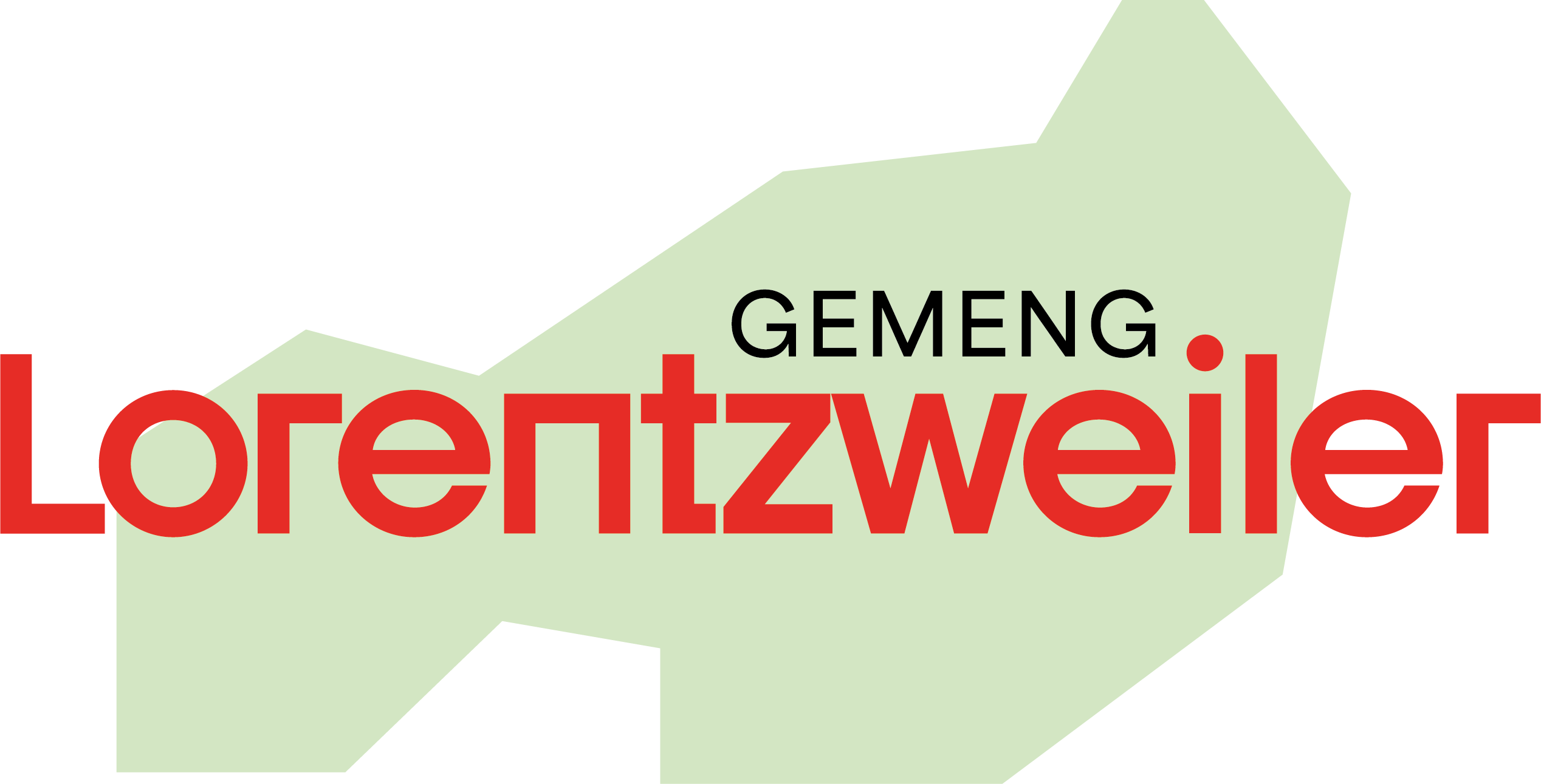
- Coat of arms Brandmark

- Map of Luxembourg with Lorentzweiler highlighted in orange, and the canton in dark red
- Coordinates: 49.7°N 6.15°E
- Country: Luxembourg
- Canton: Mersch

Government
  - Mayor: Marguy Kirsch-Hirtt

Area
  - Total: 17.45 km^{2} (6.74 sq mi)
  - Rank: 65th of 100
- Highest elevation: 436 m (1,430 ft)
  - Rank: 25th of 100
- Lowest elevation: 219 m (719 ft)
  - Rank: 35th of 100

Population (2026)
  - Total: 4,790
  - Rank: 39th of 100
  - Density: 274/km^{2} (711/sq mi)
  - Rank: 32nd of 100
- Time zone: UTC+1 (CET)
  - Summer (DST): UTC+2 (CEST)
- LAU 2: LU0000408
- Website: lorentzweiler.lu

Lorentzweiler (German pronunciation: [ˈloːʁɛntsvaɪlɐ]; Luxembourgish: Luerenzweiler) is a commune and small town in central Luxembourg, in the canton of Mersch. It is mostly situated in the Alzette valley, and includes a small portion of the Gréngewald forest.

As of September 2026, the town of Lorentzweiler, which lies in the centre of the commune, has a population of 1,676. Other towns within the commune include Asselscheuer, Blaschette, Bofferdange, and Helmdange, Hunsdorf.

The Luxembourg Point of Inaccessibility (furthest point from any border) lies in Lorentzweiler at Latitude: 49° 41.9787'N Longitude: 006° 10.0303'E

== Transportation ==
The commune is served by Lorentzweiler railway station on CFL Line 10, opened in 1862, which has an RB service linking it to Luxembourg City and Diekirch.

== Population ==
Historical population

| Year | Pop. | ±% |
|---|---|---|
| 1821 | 1,133 | — |
| 1851 | 1,512 | +33.5% |
| 1900 | 1,186 | −21.6% |
| 1910 | 1,248 | +5.2% |
| 1922 | 1,325 | +6.2% |
| 1935 | 1,450 | +9.4% |

| Year | Pop. | ±% |
|---|---|---|
| 1947 | 1,432 | −1.2% |
| 1960 | 1,462 | +2.1% |
| 1970 | 1,788 | +22.3% |
| 1981 | 2,448 | +36.9% |
| 1990 | 2,764 | +12.9% |
| 2000 | 2,912 | +5.4% |

| Year | Pop. | ±% |
|---|---|---|
| 2005 | 3,031 | +4.1% |
| 2010 | 3,261 | +7.6% |
| 2015 | 3,723 | +14.2% |
| 2020 | 4,246 | +14.0% |
| 2021 | 4,348 | +2.4% |

Source data

== Sports ==
Lorentzweiler is home to the football club FC Lorentzweiler, which in the 2024-25 season plays in Serie 1 of the 1. Division after having been relegated from the Division of Honour, as well as to the volleyball club VC Lorentzweiler, which plays in the National Division.

=== Pidal ===
Alongside Walferdange and Steinsel, the commune co-manages PIDAL (Piscine intercommunale de l’Alzette), a swimming pool in Walferdange that includes a spa area, a sauna, a fitness room and a restaurant.

== Notable people ==
- Jos Wohlfart (1920–2000), a Luxembourgish politician, Mayor of Lorentzweiler (1961-1974), Minister of the Interior (1974-1979), MEP (1988-1989).
- Georges Wohlfart (1950-2013), a Luxembourgish doctor and politician, Minister of Health (1988-1999).
- Emile Haag (born 1942), a Luxembourgish historian, trade unionist and former principal of the Athénée de Luxembourg.
- Émile Reuter (1874-1973), a Luxembourgish politician, Prime Minister (1918-1925), President of the Chamber of Deputies (1926-1959), born in Bofferdange.
- Guillaume V, Grand Duke of Luxembourg (born 1981), attended primary school in Lorentzweiler.
- Prince Félix of Luxembourg (born 1984), also attended primary school at Lorentzweiler.
