= A7 motorway (Luxembourg) =

Highway in Luxembourg

Autoroute 7
- Autobunn 7
- Autoroute du Nord
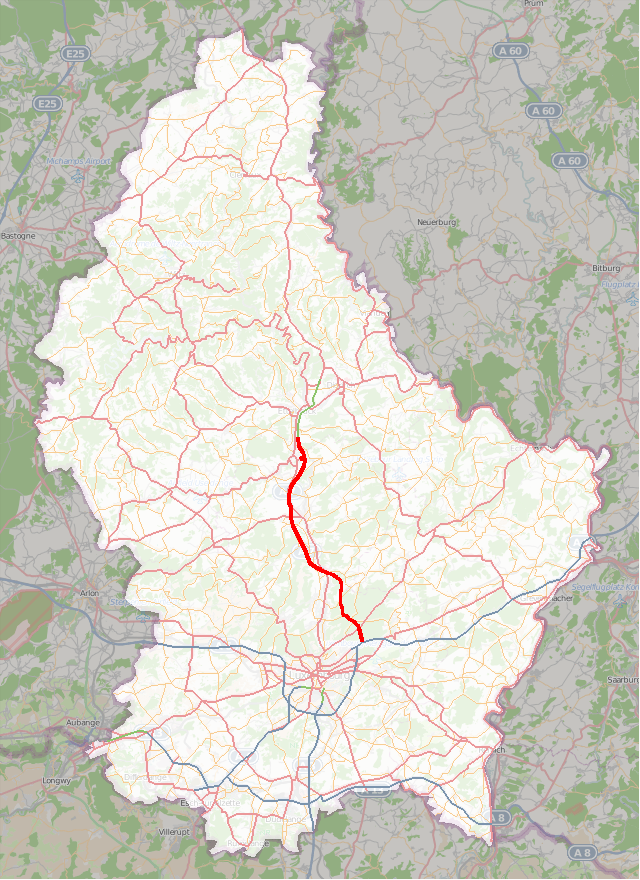

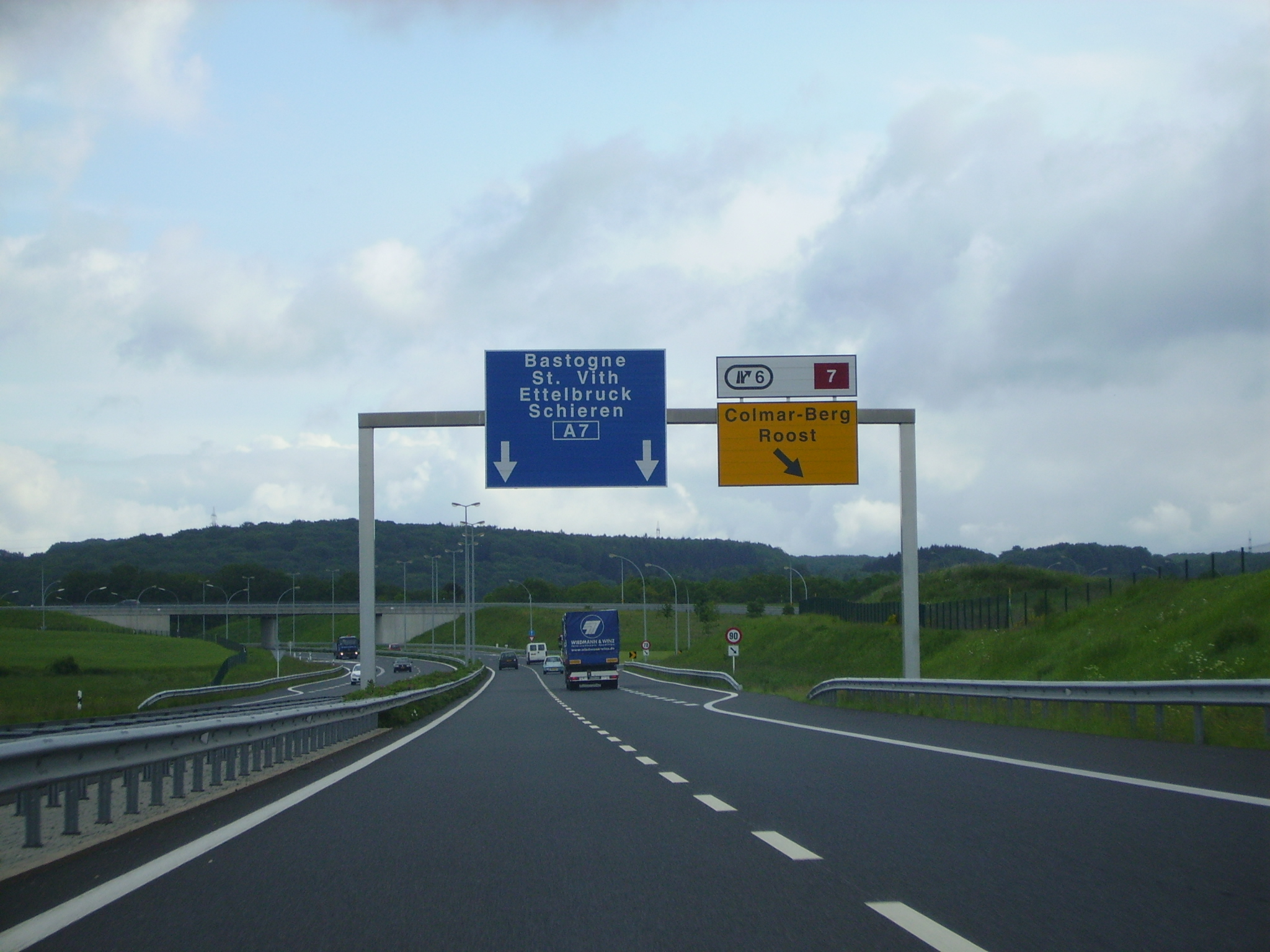

Route information
- Length: 31.468 km (19.553 mi)
- Existed: 10 November 1989–present
- History: Completed 23 September 2015

Major junctions
- South end: Kirchberg for Luxembourg City, A1
- Heisdorf; Lorentzweiler; Mersch; Colmar-Berg; Schieren; Ettelbruck; Erpeldange
- North end: Clervaux

Location
- Country: Luxembourg

Highway system
- Motorways in Luxembourg

The A7 or otherwise known as the North motorway (French: Autoroute du Nord, Luxembourgish: Nordstroos), is a motorway in Luxembourg. It links the capital city with the North of the country

== Status ==
The entire A7 opened on 23 September 2015 at 8 p.m. The complete motorway is 31.468 km long.

All of the eight planned sections of the A7 are in service:

- 10 November 1989: Ettelbruck – Erpeldange
- 29 July 1993: Schieren – Ettelbruck
- August 1996: Erpeldange – Fridhaff
- 16 November 2001: Schoenfels – Mierscherbierg
- 16 November 2001: Mierscherbierg – Schieren
- 13 September 2002: Grunewald – Waldhof
- 24 January 2008: Lorentzweiler – Schoenfels
- 23 September 2015: Waldhof – Lorentzweiler

== Route ==
Junctions and structures
	Clervaux	N 7
(J10)	Erpeldange
(J9)	Ingeldorf	N 7
(J8)	Ettelbruck	N 7
(J7)	Schieren	N 7
(J6)	Colmar-Berg
(J5)	Mierscherberg	N 7
(J4)	Mersch	N 8
	Mersch Tunnel
(J3)	Schoenfels
	Gousselerbierg Tunnel
(J2)	Lorentzweiler	N 7
	Grouft Tunnel
	Stafelter Tunnel
(J1)	Waldhof	N 11
	Grunewald Junction	A 1
