= Marcel Sauber =

Marcel Sauber (born 3 May 1939 in Echternach) is a Luxembourgish politician. He is a deputy in the Chamber of Deputies, representing the Centre constituency for the Christian Social People's Party (CSV). He had been President of the Council of State and mayor of Walferdange.

Sauber was appointed a member of the Council of State on 28 June 1985, replacing Joseph Foog. He was elected to the communal council of Walferdange in the 1987 election, sitting until the present day. In that time, he was mayor from 6 February 1995 until 31 December 1999. Sauber ran for the Chamber of Deputies for Centre in the 1999 election, finishing twelfth of the CSV candidates, whilst six were elected.

Having not been elected to the Chamber, Sauber was appointed vice-president on 6 December 1999, and President of the Council of State on 15 January 2001, succeeding Raymond Kirsch. He served in this capacity until 11 March 2003, when he resigned to take up the vacancy in the Chamber of Deputies left by the death of Willy Bourg in February. He ran for re-election in 2004, finishing twelfth once more. However, on the back of a CSV landslide, Sauber was promoted to take up one of the places vacated by government ministers, and has sat in the Chamber since then.

== Footnotes ==
Political offices
Preceded by Raymond Kirsch	President of the Council of State; 2001–2003	Succeeded by Pierre Mores
