= Alain Meyer =

Luxembourgish politician

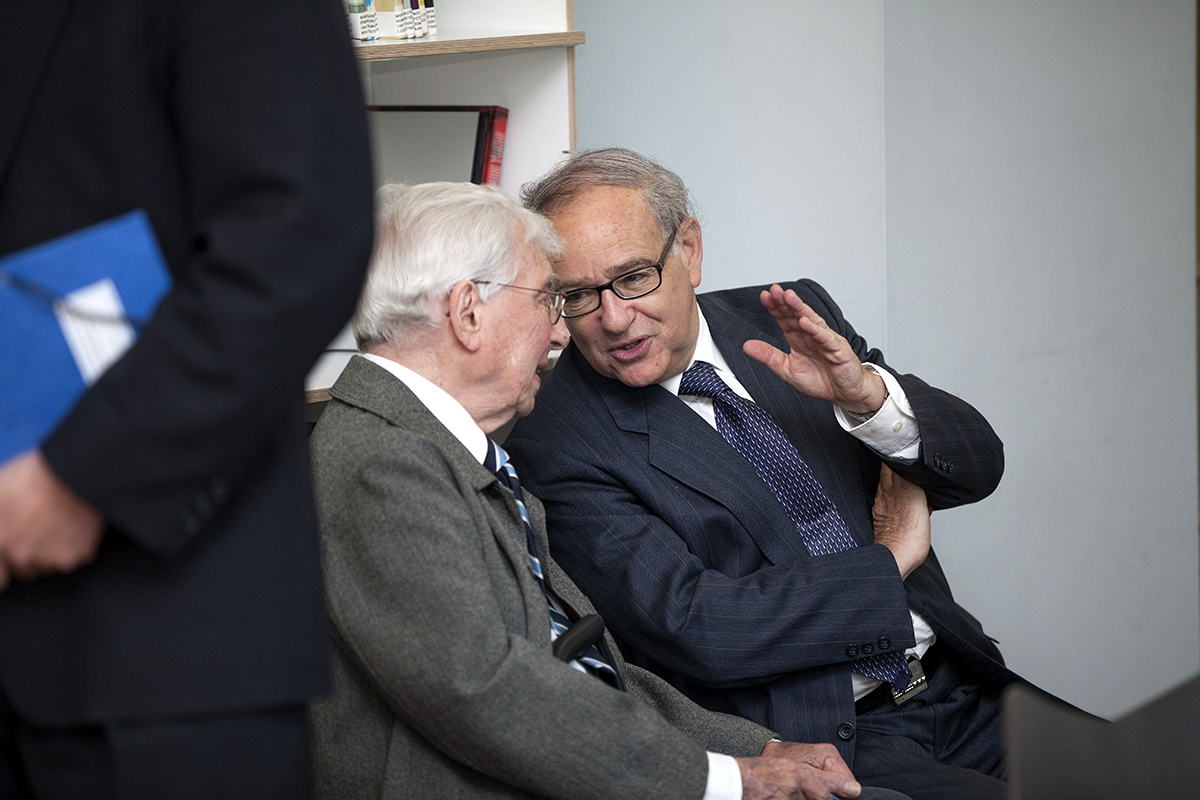
Alain Meyer (right) chats with Arno J. Mayer at an IEIS conference in Luxembourg, May 2013

Alain Meyer (born 21 November 1949 in Luxembourg City) is a Luxembourgish politician. He was the President of Luxembourg's Council of State, in which capacity he served from 1 October 2007 till 14 November 2009.

A member of the Luxembourg Socialist Workers' Party since 1981, Meyer was first nominated to the Council of State on 15 November 1991 to replace Georges Thorn. He was named Vice-President of the Council of State on 18 December 2006, and President on 1 October 2007 to replace Pierre Mores.

== Footnotes ==
Political offices
Preceded by Pierre Mores	President of the Council of State; 2007 – 2009	Succeeded by Georges Schroeder
