= Pierre Mores =

Pierre Mores (born 21 April 1950 in Esch-sur-Alzette) is a Luxembourgish politician, jurist, and administrator. He is in charge of administering Luxembourg's largest private-sector pension fund, the White Collar Workers' Pension Fund (CPEP).

He was appointed to the Council of State on 20 March 1990 to replace Edmond Reuter. He was named Vice-President of the Council on 14 January 2000, and replaced Marcel Sauber as President on 29 April 2003. He held the position until 30 September 2007, when he was replaced by Alain Meyer.

Upon leaving that office, he was appointed "Marshal of the Court" (French: Maréchal de la Cour; German: Hofmarschall; Luxembourgish: Haffmarschall), i.e. the Chief of Staff of the Head of State, the Grand Duke of Luxembourg.

== Footnotes ==
Political offices
Preceded by Marcel Sauber	President of the Council of State; 2003 – 2007	Succeeded by Alain Meyer
