= Jean Asselborn =

Luxembourgish politician

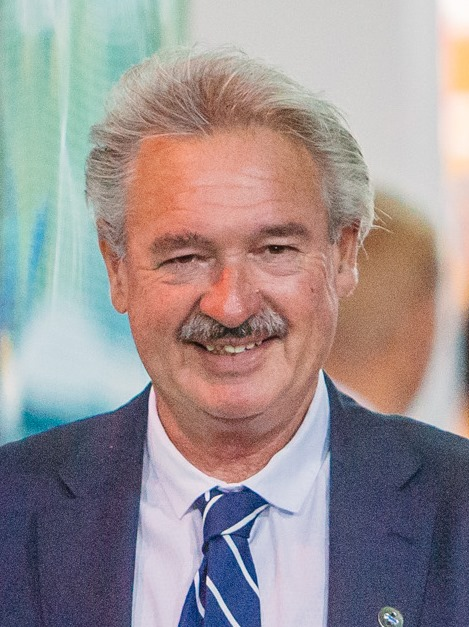
- Asselborn in 2017

Minister for Foreign and European Affairs
- In office 31 July 2004 – 17 November 2023
- Prime Minister: Jean-Claude Juncker; Xavier Bettel
- Preceded by: Charles Goerens
- Succeeded by: Xavier Bettel

Deputy Prime Minister of Luxembourg
- In office 31 July 2004 – 4 December 2013
- Prime Minister: Jean-Claude Juncker
- Preceded by: Lydie Polfer
- Succeeded by: Etienne Schneider

Member of the Chamber of Deputies
- In office 16 July 1984 – 31 July 2004
- Constituency: South

Mayor of Steinfort
- In office 1 January 1982 – 31 July 2004
- Preceded by: Ernest Sander
- Succeeded by: Guy Pettinger

Personal details
- Born: 27 April 1949 (age 77) Steinfort, Luxembourg
- Party: Socialist Workers' Party
- Education: Nancy 2 University

Jean Asselborn (Note: Luxembourgish pronunciation: [ˈʒɑ̃ː ˈɑsəlboʁn]) (born 27 April 1949) is a Luxembourgish former politician who served in the government of Luxembourg as Minister for Foreign Affairs from 2004 until 2023. He also served as Deputy Prime Minister from 2004 to 2013, under Prime Minister Jean-Claude Juncker. At the time of his retirement from national politics in 2024, he consistently ranked as the most popular politician in Luxembourg, with a popularity rate of around 80%.

== Early life and career ==
Jean Asselborn was born on 27 April 1949 in Steinfort.

Asselborn left school in 1967 at the age of 18, and began working in a Uniroyal plant that same year. It was during this time that he became actively involved in the trade union movement and was elected youth representative of the Federation of Luxembourg Workers (Lëtzebuerger Aarbechterverband), the precursor to the current OGBL trade union.

In 1968, Asselborn began working for the Luxembourg City administration as a civil servant, before returning to Steinfort in 1969, where he was also employed as a civil servant for the local administration.

Asselborn resumed his secondary studies in 1976, obtaining a diplôme de fin d’études secondaires from the Athénée de Luxembourg that same year. Upon obtaining his final secondary school diploma, he became the administrator of the Intercommunal Hospital of Steinfort (Hôpital intercommunal de Steinfort) in 1976, a post he held until 2004. In October 1981, he was awarded a master's degree in private judicial law from Nancy 2 University.

Asselborn was first sworn in as Mayor of Steinfort in 1982. He served in that position until 2004, when he was appointed to the government.

== In government ==
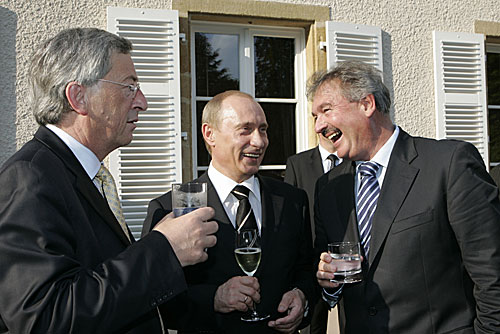
Asselborn, Prime Minister Jean-Claude Juncker and Russian President Vladimir Putin on 24 May 2007

Following the legislative elections of 13 June 2004, Jean Asselborn joined the government as Deputy Prime Minister, Minister of Foreign Affairs and Immigration on 31 July 2004.

Upon the return of the coalition government formed by the Christian Social Party (CSV) and the Luxembourg Socialist Workers' Party (LSAP) as a result of the legislative elections of 7 June 2009, Jean Asselborn retained the offices of Deputy Prime Minister, Minister of Foreign Affairs on 23 July 2009. In October 2012, at his instigation, Luxembourg was for the first time elected to a non-permanent seat on the United Nations Security Council for 2013 and 2014.

Following the legislative elections of 20 October 2013, Asselborn was appointed Minister of Foreign and European Affairs, Minister of Immigration and Asylum on 4 December 2013 in the coalition government formed by the Democratic Party (DP), the LSAP and the Green Party (“déi gréng”).

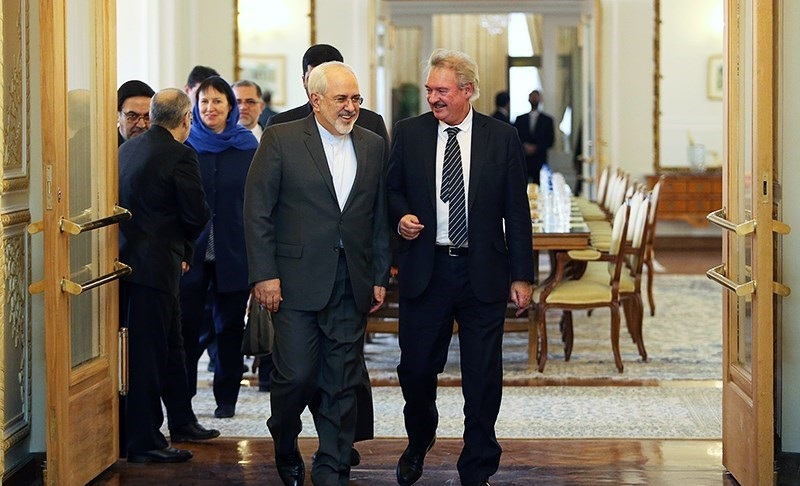
Asselborn with Iranian Foreign Minister Mohammad Javad Zarif in February 2017

As of July 2004, Asselborn represents the Luxembourg government at the Council of Ministers of the European Union in its Foreign Affairs and General Affairs configurations. Jean Asselborn is currently the longest-serving minister among the Ministers of Foreign Affairs of the European Union.

== Political views ==
In September 2010 Jean Asselborn declined a request of the Alternative Democratic Reform Party (ADR) to make Luxembourgish an official language of the European Union citing financial reasons and also that German and French being already official languages would be sufficient for the needs of Luxembourg.

In early September 2016, Asselborn called for Hungary to be suspended or expelled from the European Union over its "massive violation" of EU fundamental values, citing concerns over its treatment of refugees during the European refugee crisis, independence of the judiciary and freedom of the press.

In March 2018, Asselborn condemned the Turkish invasion of northern Syria aimed at ousting US-backed Syrian Kurds from the enclave of Afrin. Asselborn said about Turkey's conduct that "this has nothing to do with self-defence any more", adding that Turkey would have to cease and desist from attacking the YPG and explain its conduct in Afrin to the NATO council.

Asselborn doubted that the peace agreement between Israel and the United Arab Emirates would bring stability to the region, stating there will be no stability without a two-state solution, and said the UAE had let the Palestinians down with the agreement.

In September 2023, Asselborn condemned Azerbaijan's military operation in Nagorno-Karabakh. He also stressed that military operations in populated areas must immediately stop to protect the lives of civilians, and Azerbaijan must abide by its international commitments.

== Honorary distinctions ==
In December 2010, Jean Asselborn was awarded the Grand Cross of the Order of Merit (Großkreuz des Verdienstordens) of the Federal Republic of Germany.

In October 2013, he was appointed Commander of the National Order of the Legion of Honour (Ordre national de la Légion d’honneur) of the French Republic.

== See also ==
- Juncker-Asselborn I Government (2004–2009)
- Juncker-Asselborn II Government (2009–2013 )
- Bettel I Government (2013–2018)
- Bettel II Government (2018–2023)
- List of foreign ministers in 2017
- List of current foreign ministers

Party political offices
Preceded by Ben Fayot	President of the Socialist Workers' Party; 1997–2004	Succeeded by Alex Bodry
Political offices
Preceded by Jean Spautz	President of the Chamber of Deputies; 2004	Succeeded by Lucien Weiler
Preceded by Lydie Polfer	Deputy Prime Minister of Luxembourg; 2004–2013	Succeeded by Etienne Schneider
Preceded by Charles Goerens	Minister for Foreign Affairs; 2004–2023	Succeeded by Xavier Bettel
Diplomatic posts
Preceded by Ben Bot	President of the Council of the European Union; 2005	Succeeded by Jack Straw
