= Jean Spautz =

Luxembourgish politician

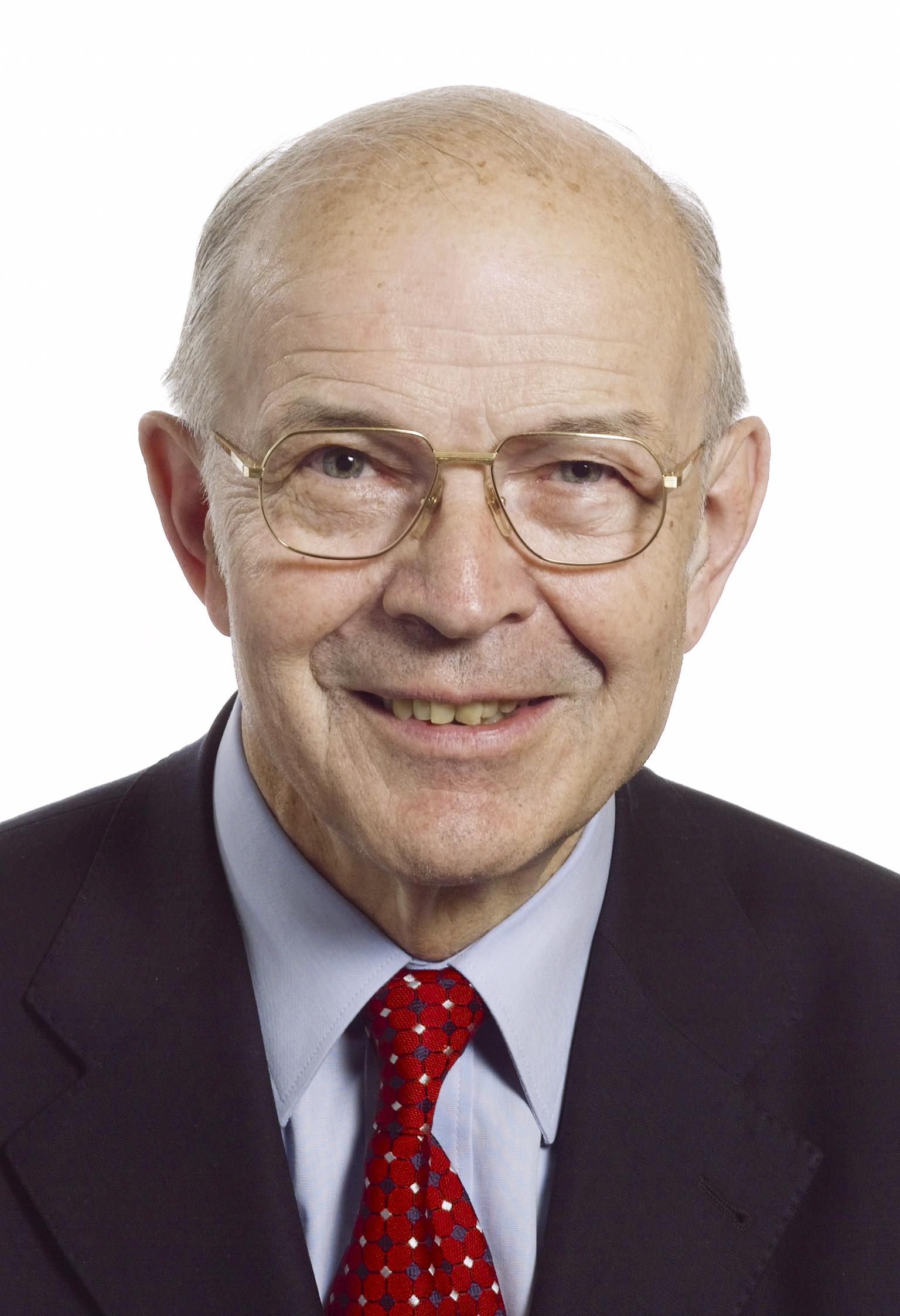
Official portrait, 2004

Jean Spautz (born 9 September 1930 in Schifflange) is a retired Luxembourgish politician of the Christian Social People's Party (CSV).

== Career ==
A steel worker at ARBED by trade, he served in the Chamber of Deputies from 1959 to 1980 and from 1995 to 2004, including as its president in the latter period. He served in the governments of Pierre Werner and Jacques Santer as Minister of the Interior from 1980 to 1995, Minister of Family, Social Housing and Social Solidarity from 1980 to 1989, Minister of Urbanism from 1989 to 1994 and Minister of Housing from 1989 to 1995.

He was also a Member of the European Parliament from 1979 to 1980 and from 2004 to 2009, after which he retired from political life.

== Titles, positions and offices ==
- President of the Christian Syndicates Luxembourg (L.C.G.B.) (1967–1980).
- President of Jeunesse Ouvrière catholique (catholic working youth) (J.O.C.) (1954–1959) and President of the youth section of the Christian-Social Party (1960–1966).
- President of the Christian-Social People's Party (1982–1995)
- Member of the Chamber of Deputies (1959-1980, 1995-2004).
- Member of the Bureau de la Chambre des Députés (1964–1976).
- Vice-President of the Chamber of Deputies (1979–1980).
- Member of the European Parliament (1979-1980, 2004-2009).
- Minister of Home affairs (1980–1995), Minister of Family affairs (1980–1989), Minister of Housing (1989–1995).
- President of the Chamber of Deputies (1995–2004).
- Honorary President of the Chamber of Deputies since 2004.

Political offices
Preceded by Erna Hennicot-Schoepges	President of the Chamber of Deputies; 1995–2004	Succeeded by Jean Asselborn
Party political offices
Preceded by Jacques Santer	President of the CSV; 1982–1990	Succeeded by Jean-Claude Juncker
Trade union offices
Preceded by Pierre Schockmel	President of the LCGB; 1967–1980	Succeeded by Marcel Glesener
