= Paul Helminger =

Luxembourgish politician (1940–2021)

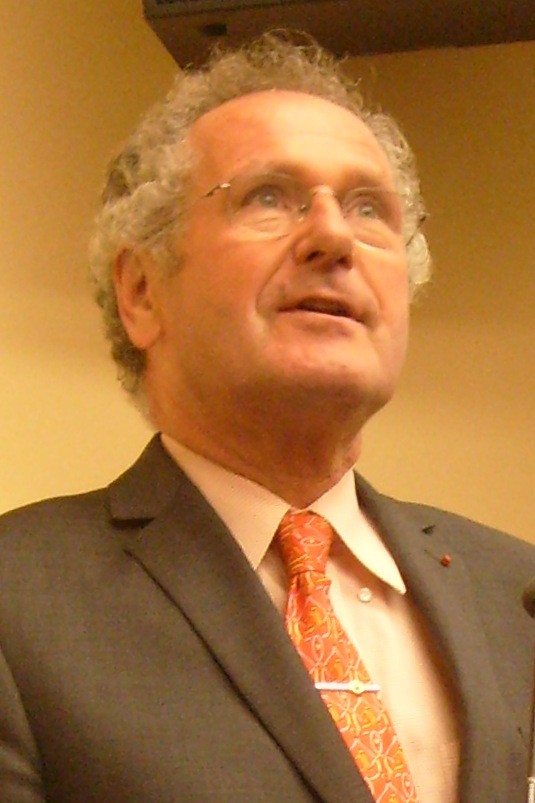

Mayor of Luxembourg City
- In office 18 August 1999 – 24 November 2011
- Preceded by: Lydie Polfer
- Succeeded by: Xavier Bettel

Member of the Chamber of Deputies
- In office 1994–2012
- In office 1984–1989

Personal details
- Born: 28 October 1940 Esch-sur-Alzette, Luxembourg
- Died: 16 April 2021 (aged 80)
- Party: Democratic Party (DP)

Paul Helminger (28 October 1940 – 16 April 2021) was a Luxembourgish politician who was Mayor of Luxembourg City from 1999 to November 2011. He was a member of the Chamber of Deputies for the Democratic Party (from 1994 to 2012, and previously from 1984 until 1989).

== Biography ==
Born in Esch-sur-Alzette in 1940, Paul Helminger moved with his family to Belair (then known as Neumerl), a district in western Luxembourg City, when he was one year old. After he attained his baccalaureate in the Athénée de Luxembourg in 1959, Helminger went on to study law at the Sorbonne in Paris until 1963. At the same time, he also studied at the Institut d'Études Politiques and attained a degree in international relations in 1963. In 1964, he finished his doctorate in jurisprudence, before moving to the United States to finish his studies in political science at Stanford University.

Helminger started to work in diplomacy for the state of Luxembourg in 1966 and represented the country in London, Helsinki and Geneva, until 1974, when Prime Minister Gaston Thorn made him his Chief of Cabinet.

In the Werner-Thorn Ministry, he was from 1979 to 1984 Secretary of State for external relations, development aid and economy.

He was deputy from 1984 to 1989, and again from 1994 to 2012.

Since 1987, Helminger was also member of the city council of Luxembourg City. He became alderman in 1991 and mayor in 1999. On 21 November 2011, he presided over the city council for the last time, retiring in favour of Xavier Bettel. Helminger received a standing ovation for his excellent work as mayor of the city. In 2012, Helminger was appointed Chairman of the Board of Directors of Luxair, the Luxembourgish national flag carrier, a post he held until 2019 when he was succeeded by Giovanni Giallombardo.

He died on 17 April 2021 at the age of 80.

== Private life ==
Paul Helminger was married and had seven children. He was president of the Luxembourg Tennis Federation from 1994 to 2003.

Political offices
Preceded by Lydie Polfer	Mayor of Luxembourg City; 1999 - 2011	Succeeded by Xavier Bettel
Sporting positions
Preceded by Michel Wolter	President of the FLT; 1994–2003	Succeeded by Yves Kemp
