= State of the Nation (Luxembourg) =

Annual speech by the Prime Minister of Luxembourg

The State of the Nation (Luxembourgish: Lag vun der Natioun, French: l'état de la Nation, German: Lage der Nation) is a speech made annually by the Prime Minister of Luxembourg to the national legislature, the Chamber of Deputies. It covers the economic, social, and financial state of the country, and is followed by a debate in the Chamber on those issues.

List of State of the Nation addresses (1985-present)
Prime minister	Number	Date
Jacques Santer	1	18 April 1985
Jacques Santer	2	17 April 1986
Jacques Santer	3	26 March 1987
Jacques Santer	4	21 April 1988
Jacques Santer	5	16 March 1989
Jacques Santer	6	2 May 1990
Jacques Santer	7	18 April 1991
Jacques Santer	8	29 April 1992
Jacques Santer	9	29 April 1993
Jacques Santer	10	16 March 1994
Jean-Claude Juncker	1	4 May 1995
Jean-Claude Juncker	2	2 May 1996
Jean-Claude Juncker	3	7 May 1997
Jean-Claude Juncker	4	7 May 1998
Jean-Claude Juncker	5	29 April 1999
Jean-Claude Juncker	6	10 May 2000
Jean-Claude Juncker	7	3 May 2001
Jean-Claude Juncker	8	7 May 2002
Jean-Claude Juncker	9	3 May 2003
Jean-Claude Juncker	10	27 April 2004
Jean-Claude Juncker	11	12 October 2005
Jean-Claude Juncker	12	2 May 2006
Jean-Claude Juncker	13	9 May 2007
Jean-Claude Juncker	14	22 May 2008
Jean-Claude Juncker	15	21 April 2009
Jean-Claude Juncker	16	5 May 2010
Jean-Claude Juncker	17	10 April 2011
Jean-Claude Juncker	18	8 May 2012
Jean-Claude Juncker	19	10 April 2013
Xavier Bettel	1	2 April 2014
Xavier Bettel	2	5 May 2015
Xavier Bettel	3	26 April 2016
Xavier Bettel	4	26 April 2017
Xavier Bettel	5	24 April 2018
Xavier Bettel	6	8 October 2019
Xavier Bettel	7	13 October 2020
Xavier Bettel	8	12 October 2021
Xavier Bettel	9	11 October 2022
Luc Frieden	1	11 June 2024
Luc Frieden	2	13 May 2025
Luc Frieden	3	19 May 2026
