= Lydie Polfer =

Luxembourgish politician

The Honourable Lydie Polfer
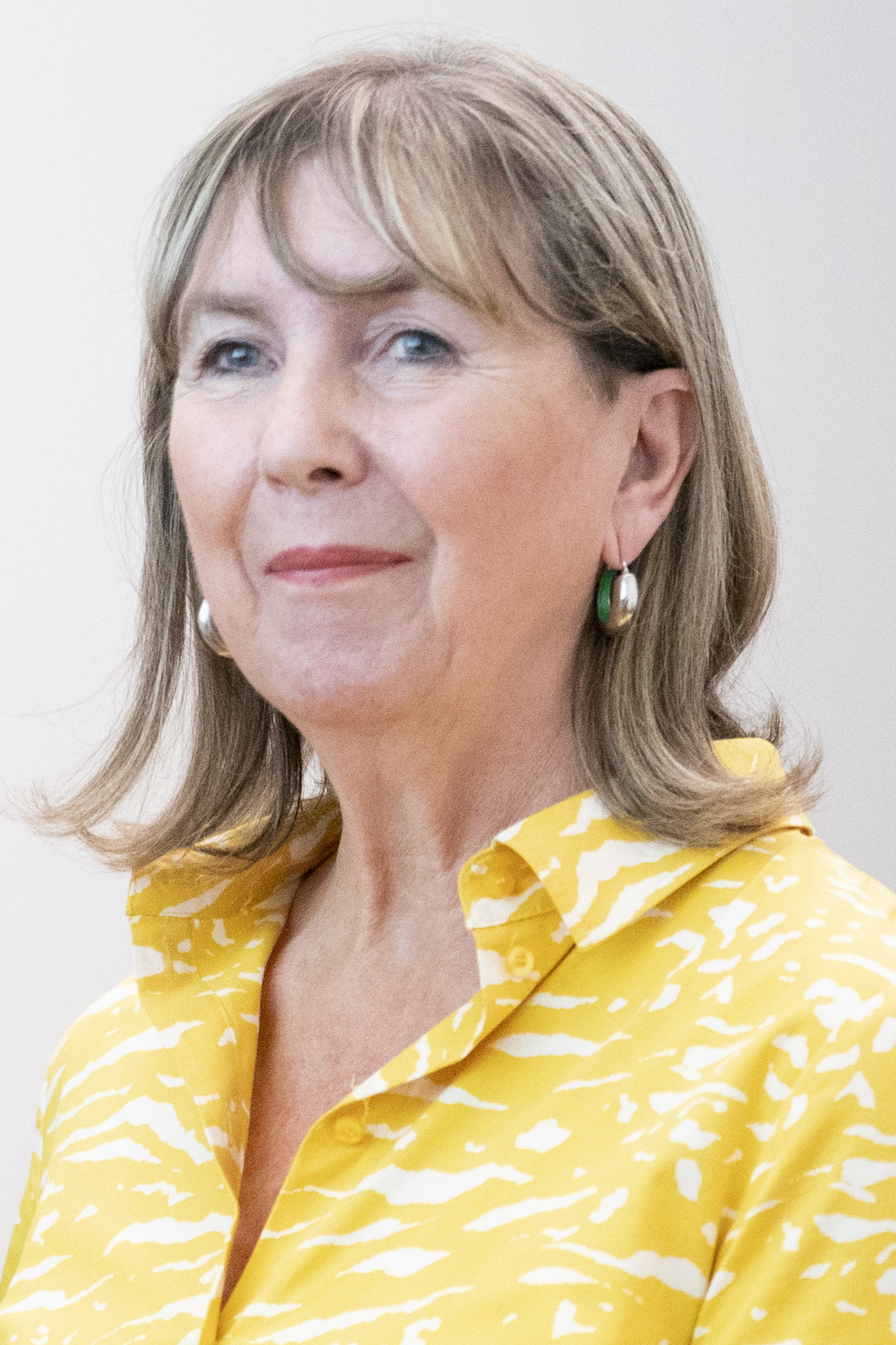
- Polfer in 2022

Mayor of Luxembourg City
- Incumbent
- Assumed office 17 December 2013
- Preceded by: Xavier Bettel
- In office 1 January 1982 – 18 August 1999
- Preceded by: Camille Polfer
- Succeeded by: Paul Helminger

Member of the Chamber of Deputies
- Incumbent
- Assumed office 8 July 2009
- Constituency: Centre
- In office 18 July 1994 – 8 June 1999
- Constituency: Centre
- In office 18 July 1989 – 14 June 1990
- Constituency: Centre
- In office 24 July 1979 – 9 October 1985
- Constituency: Centre

Deputy Prime Minister of Luxembourg Minister of Foreign Affairs
- In office 7 August 1999 – 19 July 2004
- Prime Minister: Jean-Claude Juncker
- Preceded by: Jacques Poos
- Succeeded by: Jean Asselborn

Personal details
- Born: Lydie Catherine Joséphine Polfer; 22 November 1952 (age 73) Luxembourg City, Luxembourg
- Party: Democratic Party
- Spouse: Hubert Wurth (m. 1981)

Lydie Catherine Joséphine Polfer (born 22 November 1952) is a Luxembourgish politician of the Democratic Party who has served as Mayor of Luxembourg City since 2013, having previously held the role from 1982 to 1999. She has served in a number of other capacities, including as Deputy Prime Minister and Minister for Foreign Affairs, as well as a Member of the European Parliament (MEP) and a member of the Chamber of Deputies.

== Political career ==
Polfer succeeded her father, Camille Polfer, as mayor of Luxembourg City, when he was forced to resign from the position due to poor health after only two years. She was first elected to the Chamber of Deputies in the 1984 election, representing Centre. She was the Deputy Prime Minister and Minister for Foreign Affairs in the government of Jean-Claude Juncker from August 1999 until July 2004.

In the 2004 legislative election, Polfer was elected, once again, top of the DP list, coming second overall to Luc Frieden. However, the DP polled poorly overall, losing five seats nationwide, and, with them, their position as the second-largest party and kingmakers. As such, the CSV entered instead into a coalition with the Luxembourg Socialist Workers' Party (LSAP), ejecting Polfer from the government. The European Parliament election held on the same day also saw the DP lose votes, as well as fall to fourth, behind the Greens for the first time. Nonetheless, Polfer still came top of the DP list (and third overall), and took her place in the European Parliament, where the DP sit in the Group of the Alliance of Liberals and Democrats for Europe.

She is now once again Mayor of Luxembourg City, after previously being mayor there from 1982 to 1999. Polfer is a Vice Chair of the ACP-EU Joint Parliamentary Assembly.

In the 2023 elections Polfer finished 3rd on the DP list, with 19,345 votes.

== See also ==
- Juncker-Polfer Government (1999–2004)

== Footnotes ==
Political offices
Preceded by Camille Polfer	Mayor of Luxembourg City; 1982 – 1999	Succeeded by Paul Helminger
Preceded by Xavier Bettel	Mayor of Luxembourg City; 2013 – Present	Succeeded by Present
Preceded by Jacques Poos	Deputy Prime Minister; 1999 – 2004	Succeeded by Jean Asselborn
Preceded by Jacques Poos	Minister for Foreign Affairs; 1999 – 2004	Succeeded by Jean Asselborn
Party political offices
Preceded by Charles Goerens	President of the DP; 1994 – 2004	Succeeded by Claude Meisch
