= 2026 in Luxembourg =

- Decades: 2000s; 2010s; 2020s
- See also: History of Luxembourg; List of years in Luxembourg

Events in the year 2026 in Luxembourg.

== Incumbents ==
- Monarch: Guillaume V
- Prime Minister: Luc Frieden
- Deputy Prime Minister: Xavier Bettel
- President of the Chamber of Deputies: Claude Wiseler
- President of the Council of State: Marc Thewes
- Mayor of Luxembourg City: Lydie Polfer

== Events ==
=== January ===
- 20 January – Georges Mischo and Marc Hansen are sworn in as members of the Chamber of Deputies, replacing Marc Spautz and Fernand Etgen respectively.
- 20 January – André Bauler is elected as one of the Vice-Presidents of the Chamber of Deputies, replacing Fernand Etgen.
- 27 January – A French real estate agent is stabbed to death by a 27-year Belgian client in Limpertsberg, provoking a large-scale police operation.

=== May ===
- 19 May – Ukraine repatriates the remains of nationalist leader Andriy Melnyk and his wife Sofia from Bonnevoie cemetery for an official reburial in Kyiv.

=== September ===
- 18 September – A drone sighting shuts down Luxembourg Airport.

=== November ===
- 2 November – A cyberattack is carried out on refrigeration systems of supermarkets across seven European countries including Luxembourg, resulting in financial losses caused by food spoilage.

== Holidays ==
- 1 January – New Year's Day
- 6 April – Easter Monday
- 1 May – International Workers' Day
- 9 May – Europe Day
- 14 May – Ascension Day
- 25 May – Whit Monday
- 23 June – National Day
- 15 August – Assumption Day
- 1 November – All Saints' Day
- 25 December – Christmas Day
- 26 December – Saint Stephen's Day

== Deaths ==
- 6 January – Robert Goebbels, 81, minister for the economy (1989–1999) and energy (1994–1999), signatory of the Schengen Agreement
- 21 January – Colette Flesch, 88, Olympic fencer (1960, 1964, 1968) and politician, mayor of Luxembourg City (1969–1980), deputy prime minister (1980–1984) and three-time MEP
- 1 February – Lucien Weiler, 74, politician, President of the Chamber of Deputies (2004-2009), deputy (1984-2013).
- 15 February – Pol Greisch, 95, actor and writer.

== Art and entertainment ==
- List of Luxembourgish submissions for the Academy Award for Best International Feature Film
