= 2022 in Luxembourg =

- Decades: 2000s; 2010s; 2020s
- See also: History of Luxembourg; List of years in Luxembourg

Events in the year 2022 in Luxembourg.

== Incumbents ==
- Monarch: Henri
- Prime Minister: Xavier Bettel
- Deputy Prime Minister:
  - Dan Kersch and François Bausch (until 5 January)
  - Paulette Lenert and François Bausch (from 5 January)
- President of the Chamber of Deputies: Fernand Etgen
- President of the Council of State: Christophe Schiltz
- Mayor of Luxembourg City: Lydie Polfer

== Events ==
Ongoing — COVID-19 pandemic in Luxembourg

- 17 June – Luxembourg report their first confirmed cases of monkeypox.

== Sports ==
- 7 August 2021 - 22 May 2022: 2021–22 Luxembourg National Division
- 7 August 2022 - 21 May 2023: 2022–23 Luxembourg National Division

== Deaths ==
- 12 January – Joseph Zangerle, 72, footballer (Union Luxembourg, national team)
- 19 February – Jacques Poos, 86, politician, minister of finances (1976–1979) and foreign affairs (1984–1999), deputy prime minister (1984–1999).
- 4 July – Hubert Erang, 91, Olympic gymnast (1952, 1960).
- 24 July – Alain David, 90, Luxembourg-born French Olympic sprinter (1956).
