= 2027 in Luxembourg =

- Decades: 2000s; 2010s; 2020s
- See also: History of Luxembourg; List of years in Luxembourg

Events in the year 2027 in Luxembourg.

== Events ==
=== Predicted and scheduled events ===
- 2 August – Solar eclipse of August 2, 2027 (total eclipse)

== Art and entertainment ==
- List of Luxembourgish submissions for the Academy Award for Best International Feature Film

== Holidays ==
- 1 January – New Year's Day
- 29 March – Easter Monday
- 1 May – International Workers' Day
- 6 May – Ascension Day
- 9 May – Europe Day
- 17 May – Whit Monday
- 23 June – National Day
- 15 August – Assumption Day
- 1 November – All Saints' Day
- 25 December – Christmas Day
- 26 December – Saint Stephen's Day
