= 2020 in Luxembourg =

- Decades: 2000s; 2010s; 2020s
- See also: History of Luxembourg; List of years in Luxembourg

Events from the year 2020 in Luxembourg.

== Incumbents ==
- Monarch: Henri
- Prime Minister: Xavier Bettel
- Deputy Prime Minister:
  - Etienne Schneider and François Bausch (until 4 February)
  - Dan Kersch and François Bausch (from 4 February)
- President of the Chamber of Deputies: Fernand Etgen
- President of the Council of State: Agnès Durdu
- Mayor of Luxembourg City: Lydie Polfer

== Events ==
- 29 February - 1st case of the COVID-19 pandemic in Luxembourg
- 29 February - Luxembourg became the first country in the world to make all public transport in the country (buses, trams, and trains) free to use.
- 5 March - a man returned from northern Italy and was tested positive for the virus. He was put in quarantine at the Centre Hospitalier de Luxembourg.
- 6 March - a woman was confirmed with the virus after staying in the Alsace region in France, bringing the total number of confirmed cases to 3.
- 7 March - the Ministry of Health confirmed another case of coronavirus in the country, stating that the infected person had an "epidemiological link" with northern Italy.
- 8 March - another case was confirmed, with an infected patient who had recently returned from the Alsace region in France.
- 10 March - two cases were confirmed simultaneously, with one returning home from the United States and one returning from Switzerland.
- 12 March - the Ministry of Health confirmed 19 new cases in Luxembourg, bringing the total number of cases to 26, with a 94-year-old in critical condition. According to the ministry, two of the patients were infected in Luxembourg while the other 10 got infected abroad. One of the cases was diagnosed at Kirchberg Hospital, and since then the hospital has implemented numerous precautionary measures, including limiting patient visits, only hospital staff can reserve parking spaces being reserved for hospital staff only, outpatient consultations being substantially reduced, and controlled access at the main entrance. The ministry also announced that schools would close from 16 to 27 March following the recent number of cases in Luxembourg.

== Deaths ==
- 21 January – Eugène Berger, Member of Parliament
