= 2021 in Luxembourg =

- Decades: 2000s; 2010s; 2020s
- See also: History of Luxembourg; List of years in Luxembourg

Events in the year 2021 in Luxembourg.

== Incumbents ==
- Monarch: Henri
- Prime Minister: Xavier Bettel
- Deputy Prime Minister:
  - Dan Kersch and François Bausch
- President of the Chamber of Deputies: Fernand Etgen
- President of the Council of State:
  - Agnès Durdu (until 6 April)
  - Christophe Schiltz (from 7 April)
- Mayor of Luxembourg City: Lydie Polfer

== Events ==
Ongoing — COVID-19 pandemic in Luxembourg

- 11 December - Several hundred people demonstrated in Luxembourg on Saturday against the anti-Covid measures adopted in the Grand Duchy. The rally, flown over by a helicopter and drones, was strictly supervised by Luxembourg police, supported by reinforcements from neighboring Belgium, after overflows that occurred on Saturday, December 4 during a similar demonstration. The protesters then forced the entrance to a Christmas market and threw eggs at the home of Prime Minister Xavier Bettel, demanding his resignation. The police this time used a water cannon to repel a group of demonstrators who were trying to force the roadblock blocking access to the city center by throwing firecrackers and smoke bombs. A dozen people were arrested.

== Deaths ==
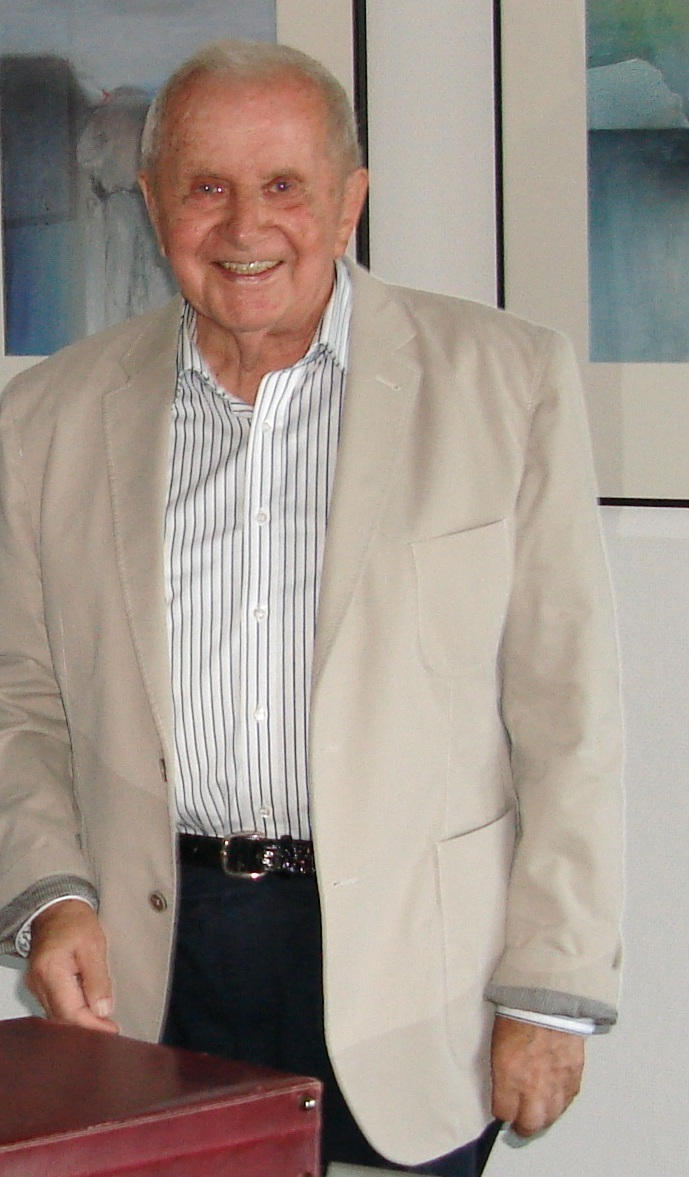
Emile Hemmen

- 8 January – Emile Hemmen, poet (born 1923).
- 12 February – Carlo Wagner, politician, (born 1953).
- 9 March – Josy Stoffel, swimmer (born 1928).
- 17 April – Paul Helminger, politician (born 1940).
