= 2014 in Luxembourg =

- Decades: 1990s; 2000s; 2010s; 2020s
- See also: History of Luxembourg; List of years in Luxembourg

The following lists events that happened during 2014 in Luxembourg.

== Incumbents ==
- Monarch: Henri
- Prime Minister: Xavier Bettel
- Deputy Prime Minister: Etienne Schneider
- President of the Chamber of Deputies: Mars Di Bartolomeo
- President of the Council of State:
  - Victor Gillen (until 20 December)
  - Viviane Ecker (from 23 December)
- Mayor of Luxembourg City: Lydie Polfer

== Events ==
=== June ===
- 18 June - Luxembourg's Chamber of Deputies votes to equalize same-sex marriage and adoption rights from 1 January 2015.

=== July ===
- 18 July - Espírito Santo Financial Group, the holding company for Portugal's second largest bank, Banco Espírito Santo, files for creditor protection in Luxembourg.
