= 2015 in Luxembourg =

- Decades: 1990s; 2000s; 2010s; 2020s
- See also: History of Luxembourg; List of years in Luxembourg

The following lists events that happened during 2015 in the Grand Duchy of Luxembourg.

== Incumbents ==
- Monarch: Henri
- Prime Minister: Xavier Bettel
- Deputy Prime Minister: Etienne Schneider
- President of the Chamber of Deputies: Mars Di Bartolomeo
- President of the Council of State: Viviane Ecker
- Mayor of Luxembourg City: Lydie Polfer

== Events ==
- 7 June - In a constitutional referendum, a large majority of voters reject lowering the voting age to 16, extending the right to vote in general elections to foreign residents, and the introduction of term limits for government members.
