= 2024 in Luxembourg =

- Decades: 2000s; 2010s; 2020s
- See also: History of Luxembourg; List of years in Luxembourg

Events in the year 2024 in Luxembourg.

== Incumbents ==
- Monarch: Henri
- Prime Minister: Luc Frieden
- Deputy Prime Minister: Xavier Bettel
- President of the Chamber of Deputies: Claude Wiseler
- President of the Council of State: Christophe Schiltz (until 6 April); Marc Thewes (from 7 April)
- Mayor of Luxembourg City: Lydie Polfer

== Events ==
- 7-11 May - Luxembourg participates in the Eurovision Song Contest for the first time since 1993, being represented by Tali, who finishes 13th with her song "Fighter".
- 9 June – In the election for the European Parliament, in which Luxembourg is represented by 6 MEPs, the Democratic Party loses one seat while the Alternative Democratic Reform Party wins one for the first time.
- 23 June – On the Grand Duke's Official Birthday, Henri, Grand Duke of Luxembourg announces that his son and heir Guillaume will assume royal duties beginning in October, in preparation for Henri's eventual abdication.
- 26 September – Pope Francis makes a one-day visit to Luxembourg as part of the first papal visit to the country since 1985.

== Holidays ==
- 1 January - New Year's Day
- 1 April - Easter Monday
- 1 May - International Workers' Day
- 9 May - Ascension Day
- 9 May - Europe Day
- 20 May - Whit Monday
- 23 June – National Day
- 15 August - Assumption Day
- 1 November - All Saints' Day
- 25 December - Christmas Day
- 26 December - Saint Stephen's Day

== Art and entertainment ==
- List of Luxembourgish submissions for the Academy Award for Best International Feature Film
