= Oath of the Grand Dukes of Luxembourg =

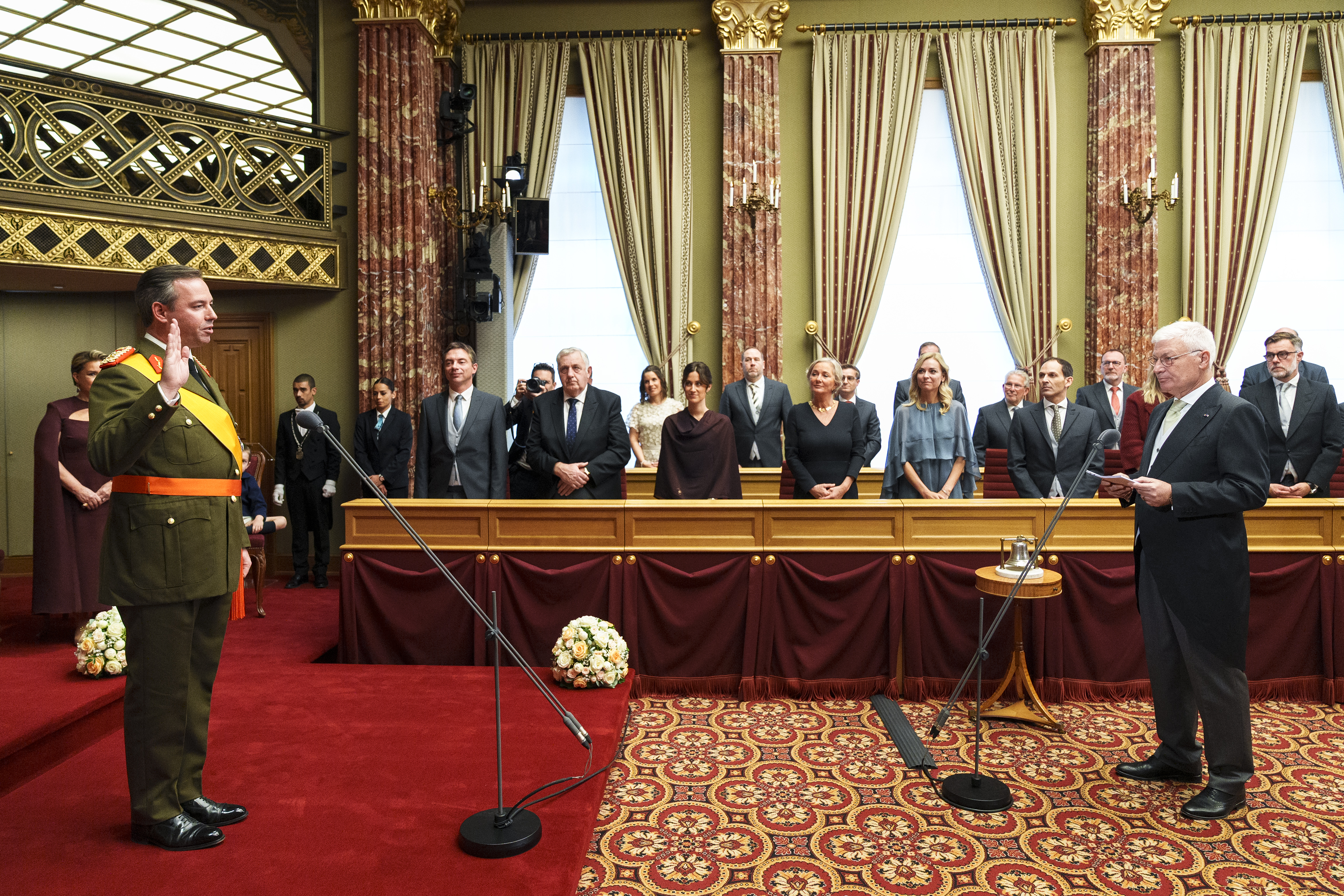
Oath of Grand Duke Guillaume V of Luxembourg.

Luxembourg's sovereign grand dukes have never been crowned. Instead, the sovereign is enthroned at a simple ceremony held in the nation's parliament at the beginning of his or her reign to take an oath of loyalty to the state constitution as required by the constitution.

The sovereign then attends a solemn mass at the Notre-Dame Cathedral. No crown or other regalia exists for the rulers of Europe's last sovereign Grand Duchy.

== History ==
=== Adolphe, Grand Duke of Luxembourg ===
The investiture ceremony of Adolphe, Grand Duke of Luxembourg, was held on November 23, 1890.

=== Guillaume IV, Grand Duke of Luxembourg ===
Grand Duke Adolf died in 1905, leaving the throne to his only son, Guillaume IV of Luxembourg, a 53-year-old man with very frail health, who married late and had only six daughters, the oldest being only 10 years old.

The investiture ceremony of Grand Duke Guillaume IV was held on November 17, 1905.

=== Marie-Adélaïde, Grand Duchess of Luxembourg ===
The investiture ceremony of Grand Duchess Marie-Adélaïde was held on February 25, 1912.

=== Charlotte, Grand Duchess of Luxembourg ===
Charlotte succeeded her older sister, Marie-Adélaïde, who abdicated on January 15, 1919..

=== Jean, Grand Duke of Luxembourg ===
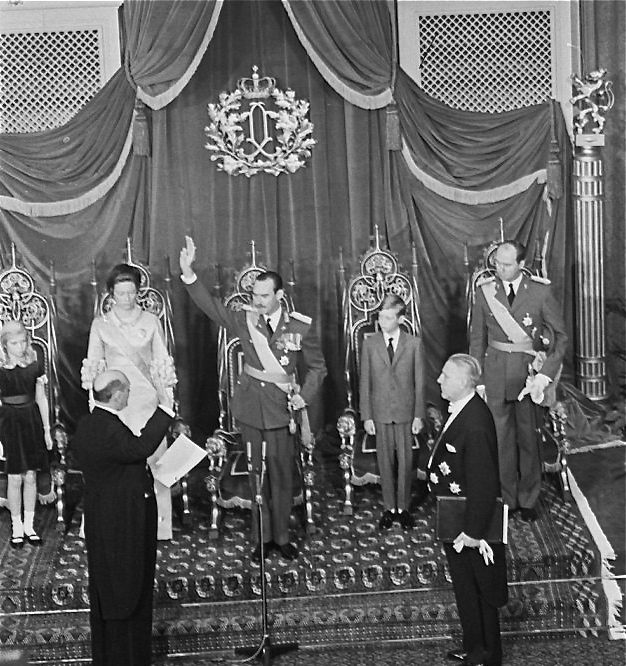
Grand Duke Jean taking his constitutional oath before the Chamber of Deputies on 12 November 1964.

Jean was named Lieutenant-Representative of the Grand Duchess on 28 April 1961. He became Grand Duke when his mother, Grand Duchess Charlotte, abdicated on 12 November 1964. The same day, he was made a General of the Armed Forces of Luxembourg.

=== Henri, Grand Duke of Luxembourg ===
On 4 March 1998, Prince Henri was appointed as lieutenant representative by his father, Grand Duke Jean, meaning that he assumed most of his father's constitutional powers. On 7 October 2000, immediately following the abdication of his father, Henri acceded as Grand Duke of Luxembourg and took the constitutional oath before the Chamber of Deputies later that day.

=== Guillaume V, Grand Duke of Luxembourg ===
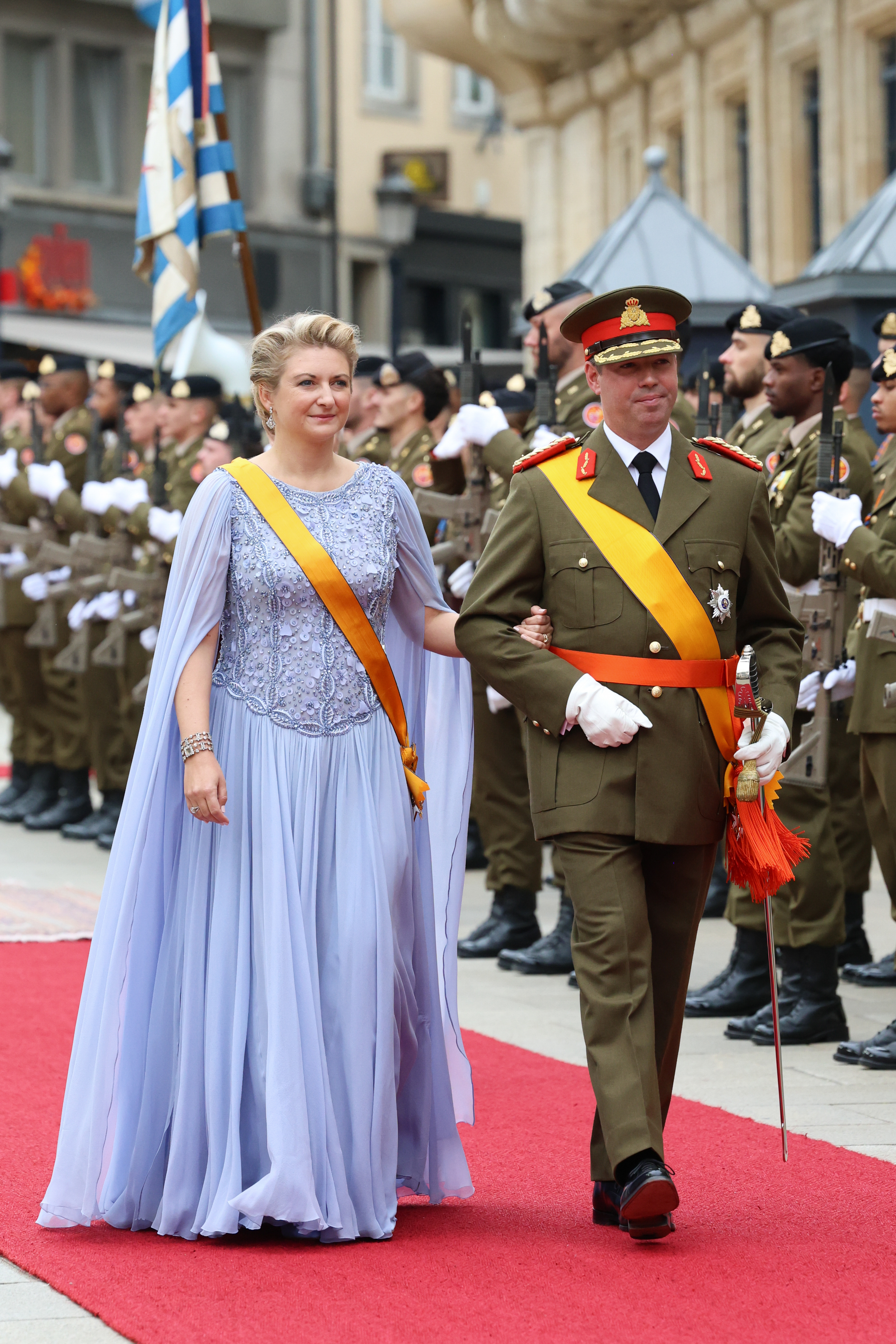
Guillaume with Stéphanie on the day of his accession to the throne

On 8 October 2024, as had been announced by Grand Duke Henri on his Official Birthday that year, Guillaume was appointed as lieutenant representative (regent). Under this capacity, he assumed a number of his father's constitutional powers, such as the swearing in of ambassadors and the signing of Grand Ducal Decrees. This is traditionally the first step in the abdication process in Luxembourg, as both Jean (1961–1964) and Henri (1998–2000) have previously served in the position. On 24 December 2024, during his Christmas message, Henri announced that the abdication would take place on 3 October 2025.

Guillaume acceded to the throne on that date, becoming Grand Duke of Luxembourg. He chose to be known as Guillaume V, thus emphasising the previous four Luxembourgish Grand Dukes named Guillaume (or William in English): Guillaume I, Guillaume II, Guillaume III, and Guillaume IV.

== Process ==
=== Abdication ceremony ===
The day begins with the signing of the grand ducal decree concerning the abdication of His Royal Highness the Grand Duke of Luxembourg by His Royal Highness the previous grand duke at the Grand Ducal Palace.

The last time this occurred was when Grand Duke Henri abdicated in favor of his son, the new grand duke Guillaume V.

The ceremony took place in the presence of national dignitaries, including the president of the Chamber of Deputies, the prime minister, the deputy prime minister, honorary ministers of state, and the mayor of Luxembourg City.

Foreign dignitaries present at abdications typically include members of the Dutch and Belgian royal families, the president of the European Parliament, and the president of the European Council.

The brothers and sisters of the new and former grand dukes, with their respective spouses, as well as the entourages of His Majesty the Grand Duke and Grand Duchess, were also present at the event.

During the ceremony, His Royal Highness the Grand Duke signed the grand ducal decree of abdication of the title of His Royal Highness the Grand Duke of Luxembourg, followed by the signature of the prime minister. The prime minister then delivered a speech.

=== Inauguration ceremony of His Royal Highness the Grand Duke ===
After the signing at the Grand Ducal Palace, the procession proceeds to the Chamber of Deputies for the investiture of His Royal Highness the Grand Duke. The session is public and takes place in the plenary hall, in the presence of members of parliament, government officials, royal guests, and foreign dignitaries. The investiture of Grand Duke Guillaume V included the reading of the Grand Ducal decree before the members of parliament, followed by a speech by Prime Minister Luc Frieden and a speech by the president of the Chamber of Deputies, Claude Wiseler. Then, the investiture of His Royal Highness Grand Duke Guillaume takes place, followed by the Speech from the Throne delivered by His Royal Highness Grand Duke Guillaume, Head of State, and the signing of the guest book.

=== The Grand Ducal family appeared on the balcony of the Grand Ducal Palace ===
After the ceremony in the Chamber of Deputies, the Grand Ducal Family, accompanied by national and foreign dignitaries, proceeds to the balcony of the Grand Ducal Palace. The new Grand Ducal couple, accompanied by the rest of the Grand Ducal family, as well as the Belgian and Dutch royal families.
