= 2025 in Luxembourg =

- Decades: 2000s; 2010s; 2020s
- See also: History of Luxembourg; List of years in Luxembourg

Events in the year 2025 in Luxembourg.

== Incumbents ==
- Monarch: Henri (until 3 October); Guillaume V (from 3 October)
- Prime Minister: Luc Frieden
- Deputy Prime Minister: Xavier Bettel
- President of the Chamber of Deputies: Claude Wiseler
- President of the Council of State: Marc Thewes
- Mayor of Luxembourg City: Lydie Polfer

== Events ==
- 25 February – The Illuccix prostate cancer imaging agent is approved in Luxembourg.
- 29 March – A worker in a Goodyear factory in Colmar-Berg is killed in a workplace accident.
- June - Fernand Kartheiser, MEP for the Alternative Democratic Reform Party (ADR) is expelled from the European Conservatives and Reformists Group, because he visited Russia.
- 22 September – Luxembourg formally recognizes the State of Palestine.
- 3 October – Henri, Grand Duke of Luxembourg abdicates and his eldest son Guillaume accedes to the throne.
- 11 December - Georges Mischo resigns as Minister for Labour and Sports amidst controversy surrounding his relationship with trade unions, and is replaced by Marc Spautz and Martine Hansen.

== Holidays ==
- 1 January – New Year's Day
- 21 April – Easter Monday
- 1 May – International Workers' Day
- 9 May – Europe Day
- 29 May – Ascension Day
- 9 June – Whit Monday
- 23 June – National Day
- 15 August – Assumption Day
- 1 November – All Saints' Day
- 25 December – Christmas Day
- 26 December – Saint Stephen's Day

== Deaths ==
- 14 January - Michel Medinger, 83, photographer and Olympic middle-distance runner (1964).
- 26 February - Pierre Joris, 78, Luxembourgish-American poet and writer.
- 1 March – Prince Frederik, 22, son of Prince Robert
- 23 March - Marcel Glesener, 87, politician and trade unionist, deputy (1989–2004).
- 17 June - Léon Krier, 79, architect.
- 19 August - Alain Anen, 75, Olympic fencer (1972).

== Art and entertainment ==
- List of Luxembourgish submissions for the Academy Award for Best International Feature Film
