= 2017 in Luxembourg =

- Decades: 1990s; 2000s; 2010s; 2020s
- See also: History of Luxembourg; List of years in Luxembourg

Events in the year 2017 in Luxembourg.

== Incumbents ==
- Monarch: Henri
- Prime Minister: Xavier Bettel
- Deputy Prime Minister: Etienne Schneider
- President of the Chamber of Deputies: Mars Di Bartolomeo
- President of the Council of State: Georges Wiwenes
- Mayor of Luxembourg City: Lydie Polfer

== Events ==
- 12 to 13 January – Luxembourg is affected by Cyclone Egon
- 8 November – Communal elections are held
- 10 December - Line T1 of the Luxembourg City Tramway is inaugurated between Luxexpo and Rout Bréck-Pafendall, marking the tramway's reintroduction after 53 years.
- 10 December - Pfaffenthal-Kirchberg railway station and the Pfaffenthal-Kirchberg funicular are inaugurated.

== Deaths ==
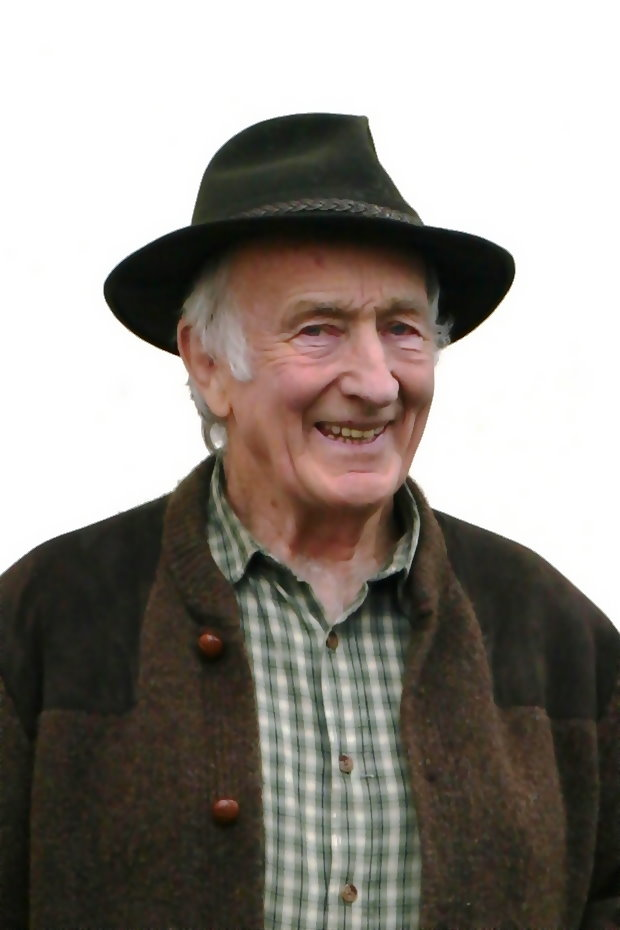
Heng Freylinger

- 17 January – Heng Freylinger, Olympic wrestler (b. 1926).
- 20 April – Fernand Leischen, fencer (b. 1919).
