= 2023 in Luxembourg =

- Decades: 2000s; 2010s; 2020s
- See also: History of Luxembourg; List of years in Luxembourg

Events in the year 2023 in Luxembourg.

== Incumbents ==
- Monarch: Henri
- Prime Minister:
  - Xavier Bettel (until 17 November)
  - Luc Frieden (from 17 November)
- Deputy Prime Minister:
  - Paulette Lenert and François Bausch (until 17 November)
  - Xavier Bettel (from 17 November)
- President of the Chamber of Deputies:
  - Fernand Etgen (until 24 October)
  - Claude Wiseler (from 21 November)
- President of the Council of State: Christophe Schiltz
- Mayor of Luxembourg City: Lydie Polfer

== Events ==
- 8 October - In the general election, the Christian Social People's Party (CSV), led by Luc Frieden wins the most seats, while Xavier Bettel's ruling government coalition loses its majority to the decline of the Greens.
- 17 November - Following coalition talks between the CSV and the Democratic Party, Luc Frieden is sworn in as prime minister alongside his coalition government.

== Sports ==
- 7 August 2022 - 21 May 2023: 2022–23 Luxembourg National Division
- UEFA Euro 2024 qualifying Group J

== Births ==
- 27 March — Prince François

== Deaths ==
- 9 February: Princess Marie Gabrielle, 97, royal
- 1 March: Anise Koltz, 94, author
- 8 March: Jean-Marie Kieffer, 62, composer
- 24 April: Ernst Huberty, 96, German-Luxembourgish sports journalist (Sportschau)
- 24 July: Mario Hirsch, 74, journalist
- 7 September: Marie-Thérèse Gantenbein-Koullen, 85, politician, deputy (2004–2009).
- 15 September: Ady Jung, 84, businessman and politician, deputy (1989–2003), president of the Benelux Interparliamentary Consultative Council (1995–1996).
- 20 September: Camille Dimmer, 84, Luxembourgish footballer (Anderlecht, national team) and politician, deputy (1984–1994)
- 1 November: Claude Michely, 64, racing cyclist
- 10 November: Marcel Schlechter, 95, politician, minister for transport and public works (1984–1989), MEP (1989–1999)
- 20 November: Rob Krier, 85, sculptor, architect, and urban designer
- 23 November: Armand Strainchamps, 68, painter and sculptor
- 19 December: Arno J. Mayer, 97, Luxembourgish-born American historian
