= 2016 in Luxembourg =

- Decades: 1990s; 2000s; 2010s; 2020s
- See also: History of Luxembourg; List of years in Luxembourg

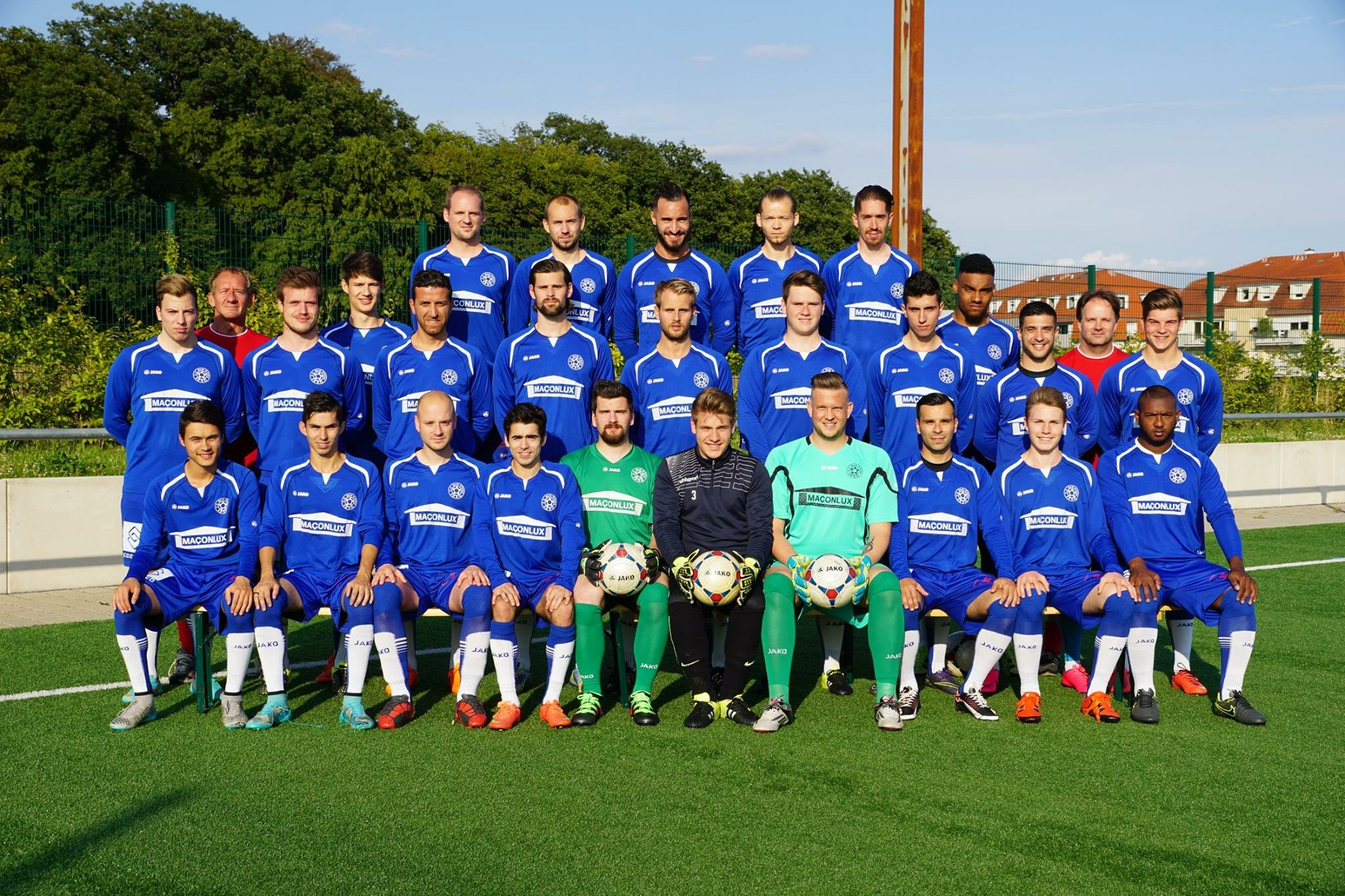
Team photo, 2016

The following lists events that happened during 2016 in the Grand Duchy of Luxembourg.

== Incumbents ==
- Monarch: Henri
- Prime Minister: Xavier Bettel
- Deputy Prime Minister: Etienne Schneider
- President of the Chamber of Deputies: Mars Di Bartolomeo
- President of the Council of State:
  - Viviane Ecker (until 28 March)
  - Georges Wiwenes (from 30 March)
- Mayor of Luxembourg City: Lydie Polfer

== Events ==
- 5–21 August - 10 athletes from Luxembourg competed in the 2016 Summer Olympics in Rio de Janeiro, Brazil
