= 2019 in Luxembourg =

- Decades: 1990s; 2000s; 2010s; 2020s
- See also: History of Luxembourg; List of years in Luxembourg

Events from the year 2019 in Luxembourg.

== Incumbents ==
- Monarch: Henri
- Prime Minister: Xavier Bettel
- Deputy Prime Minister:
  - Etienne Schneider and Félix Braz (until 11 October)
  - Etienne Schneider and François Bausch (from 11 October)
- President of the Chamber of Deputies: Fernand Etgen
- President of the Council of State:
  - Georges Wiwenes (until 31 March)
  - Agnès Durdu (from 1 April)
- Mayor of Luxembourg City: Lydie Polfer

== Events ==
- 9 August — A multiple-vortex, high-end F2 tornado tore directly through Rodange, Lamadelaine and Pétange, injuring 19 people and causing damage to many buildings, leaving as many as 100 buildings uninhabitable.

== Deaths ==
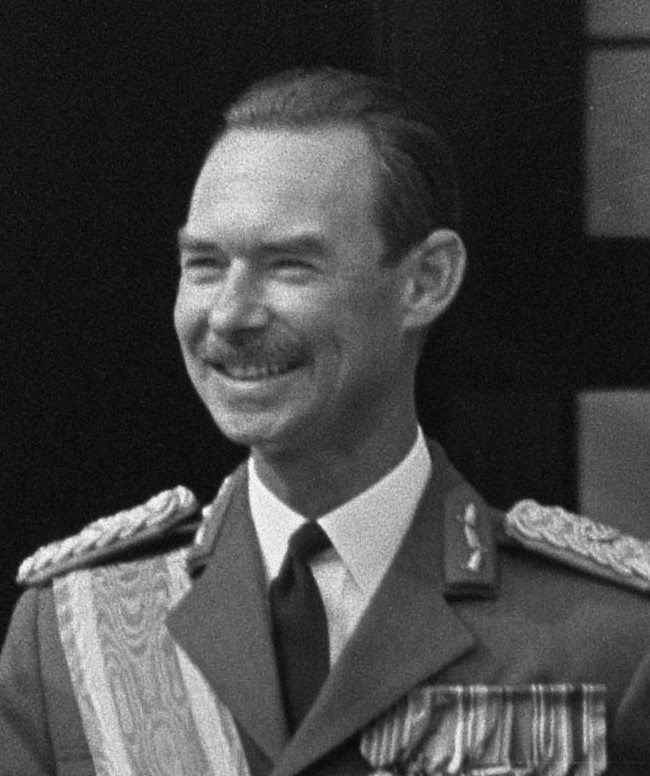
Jean, Grand Duke of Luxembourg

=== February ===
- 11 February – Alix, Princess of Ligne, Princess of Luxembourg (b. 1929)
- 21 February
  - Bernard Berg, Luxembourgish politician (b. 1931)
  - Triny Bourkel, Luxembourgish Olympic athlete (b. 1927)

=== March ===
- 23 March – Ferd Lahure, Luxembourgish footballer (b. 1929)

=== April ===
- 23 April – Jean, Grand Duke of Luxembourg (b. 1921)

=== July ===
- 3 July – Pol Cruchten, Luxembourgish film director (b. 1963)
