= 2013 in Luxembourg =

- Decades: 1990s; 2000s; 2010s; 2020s
- See also: History of Luxembourg; List of years in Luxembourg

The following lists events that happened during 2013 in the Grand Duchy of Luxembourg.

== Incumbents ==
- Monarch: Henri
- Prime Minister:
  - Jean-Claude Juncker (until 4 December)
  - Xavier Bettel (from 4 December)
- Deputy Prime Minister:
  - Jean Asselborn (until 4 December)
  - Etienne Schneider (from 4 December)
- President of the Chamber of Deputies:
  - Laurent Mosar (until 13 November)
  - Mars Di Bartolomeo (from 5 December)
- President of the Council of State: Victor Gillen
- Mayor of Luxembourg City:
  - Xavier Bettel (until 4 December)
  - Lydie Polfer (from 17 December)
