= 2018 in Luxembourg =

- Decades: 1990s; 2000s; 2010s; 2020s
- See also: History of Luxembourg; List of years in Luxembourg

Events in the year 2018 in Luxembourg.

== Incumbents ==
- Monarch: Henri
- Prime Minister: Xavier Bettel
- Deputy Prime Minister:
  - Etienne Schneider (until 5 December)
  - Etienne Schneider and Félix Braz (from 5 December)
- President of the Chamber of Deputies:
  - Mars Di Bartolomeo (until 30 October)
  - Fernand Etgen (from 6 December)
- President of the Council of State: Georges Wiwenes
- Mayor of Luxembourg City: Lydie Polfer

== Events ==
- 27 July - Line T1 of the Luxembourg City Tramway is extended between Rout Bréck-Pafendall and Place de l'Étoile.
- 14 October - In the general election, the Christian Social People's Party remains the largest party in the Chamber of Deputies, while Xavier Bettel's coalition government maintains its majority thanks to a strong result for the Greens.

== Deaths ==
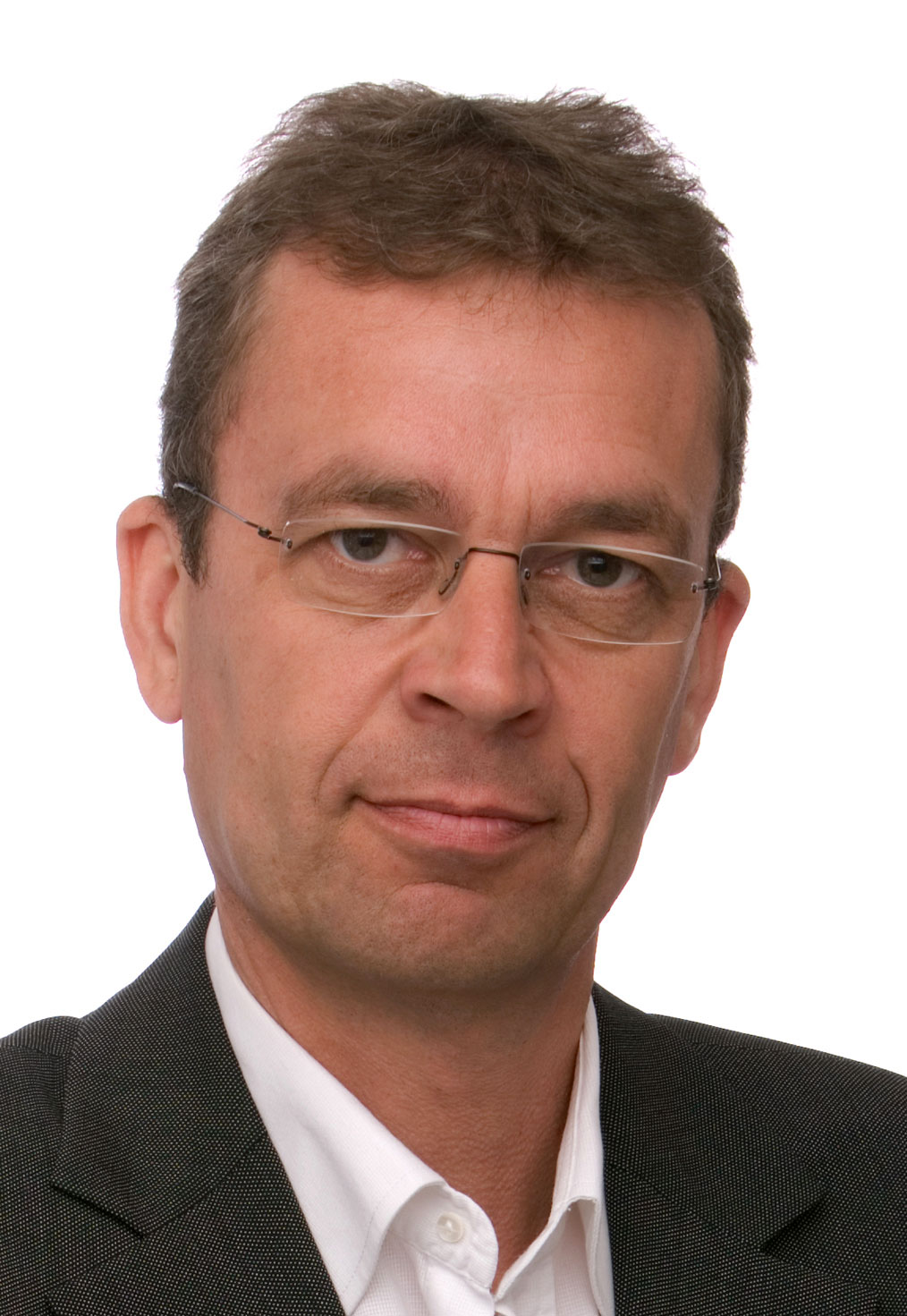
Camille Gira

- 9 January - Nicky Hoffmann, 77, footballer (Etzella Ettelbruck, national team).
- 27 January – Niki Bettendorf, 81, politician, deputy (1990-2006), Mayor of Bertrange (1982-2001).
- 7 February - Johny Hoffmann, 73, footballer (national team).
- 10 March - Armand Huberty, 87, Olympic gymnast (1952, 1960).
- 16 May – Camille Gira, 59, politician, State Secretary for Sustainable Development and Infrastructure (since 2013), deputy (1994-2013), Mayor of Beckerich (1990-2013).
- 26 May - Jules Meurisse, 87, footballer (national team).
- 3 June – Gilbert Trausch, 86, historian.
- 21 July – Camille Perl, 79, Roman Catholic curialist, Vice President of the Pontifical Commission Ecclesia Dei (2008-2009).
- 13 August - Georges Hausemer, 61, writer.
- 29 August - François Konter, 83, footballer (Anderlecht, national team).
