= Thewes =

Thewes is a surname. Notable people with the surname include:

- Marc Thewes (fl. early 21st century), Luxembourgish official
- Thomas Thewes (1931–2008), American entrepreneur and businessman
