= Mady Delvaux-Stehres =

Luxembourgish politician

Mady Delvaux MEP
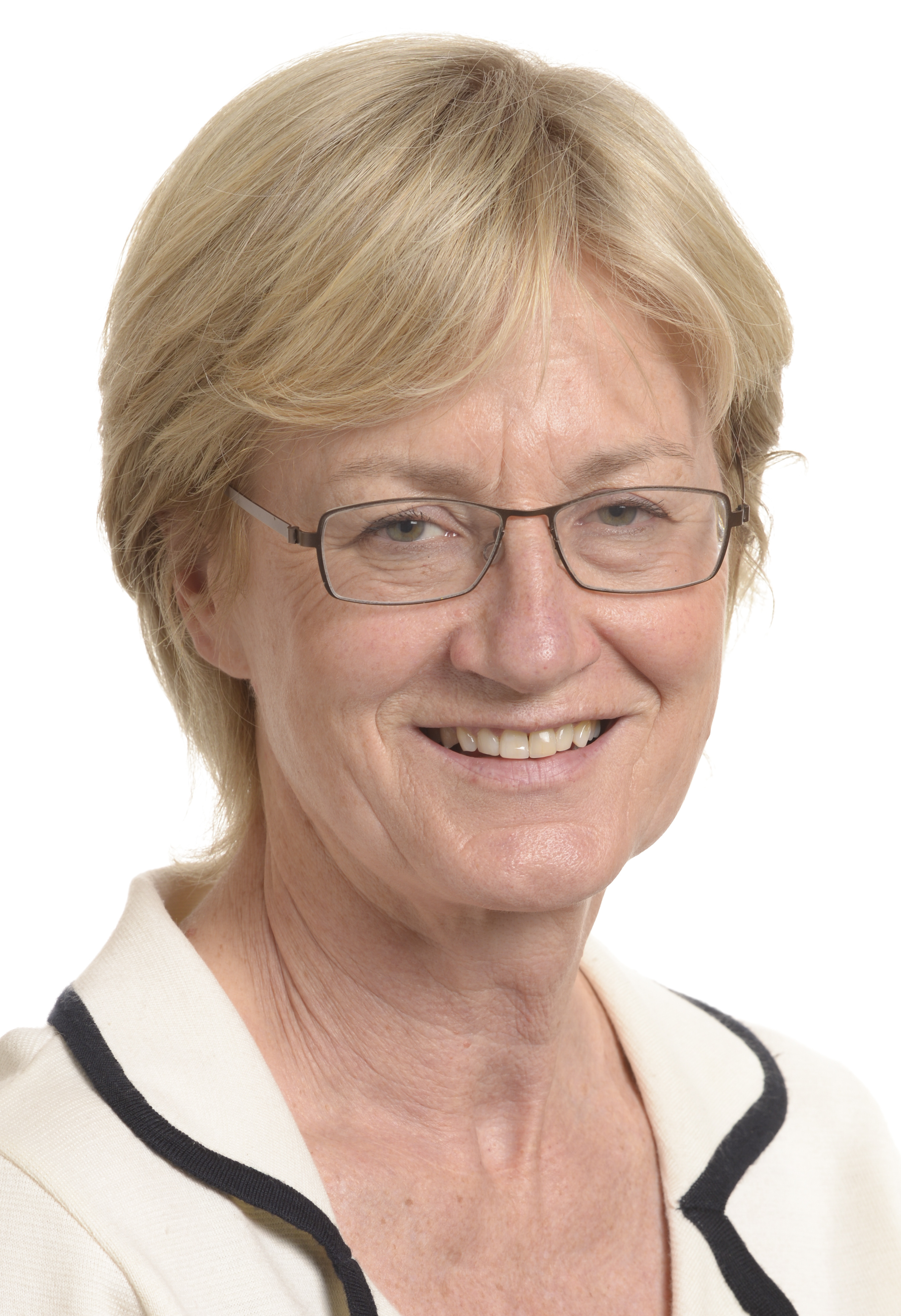

Member of the European Parliament
- In office 1 July 2014 – 1 July 2019
- Constituency: Luxembourg

Minister of National Education and Vocational Training
- In office 31 July 2004 – 4 December 2013
- Prime Minister: Jean-Claude Juncker
- Preceded by: Anne Brasseur
- Succeeded by: Claude Meisch

Minister of Social Security
- In office 13 July 1994 – 7 August 1999
- Prime Minister: Jacques Santer; Jean-Claude Juncker
- Preceded by: Johny Lahure
- Succeeded by: Carlo Wagner

Minister of Transport
- In office 13 July 1994 – 7 August 1999
- Prime Minister: Jacques Santer; Jean-Claude Juncker
- Preceded by: Robert Goebbels
- Succeeded by: Henri Grethen

Minister of Communications
- In office 13 July 1994 – 7 August 1999
- Prime Minister: Jacques Santer; Jean-Claude Juncker
- Preceded by: Alex Bodry
- Succeeded by: François Biltgen

Personal details
- Born: Mady Marion Delvaux; 11 October 1950 (age 75) Luxembourg City, Luxembourg
- Party: Luxembourgish; Luxembourg Socialist Workers' Party; EU; Party of European Socialists
- Spouse: Jean Stehres
- Children: 3
- Education: University of Paris

Madeleine Anne "Mady" Delvaux-Stehres (born 11 October 1950) is a Luxembourgish politician who served as a Member of the European Parliament from 2014 until 2019. She served as Minister of Transport from 1994 to 1999 and as Minister of Health, Social Security, Youth and Sport from 1989 to 1994.

== Education and early career ==
Delvaux-Stehres studied classical literature in Paris and became a teacher at a lycée Michel Rodange in Luxembourg.

== Political career ==
Delvaux-Stehres has been a member of the Luxembourg Socialist Workers' Party since 1974 and in 1987 became a member of the city council of Luxembourg. She gave up her teaching post in 1989 when she entered government as secretary of State for Health, Social Security, Youth, and Sport. She was Minister for Transport between 1994 and 1999, and from 2004 to 2013 Minister for Education.

From 2014 Delvaux-Stehres served as a Member of the European Parliament. In addition to her committee assignments, Delvaux-Stehres was a member of the European Parliament's Advisory Committee on the Conduct of Members.

In 2017, Delvaux-Stehres proposed a robot tax as part of a draft bill imposing ethical standards for robots in the European Union. However, the European Parliament rejected this aspect when it voted on the law.

Political offices
Preceded by Alex Bodry	Minister for Communications; 1994 – 1999	Succeeded by François Biltgen
Preceded by Robert Goebbels	Minister for Transport; 1994 – 1999	Succeeded by Henri Grethen
Preceded by	Minister for National Education and Vocational Training; 2004 – 2013	Succeeded by
