= Henri Grethen =

Luxembourgish politician

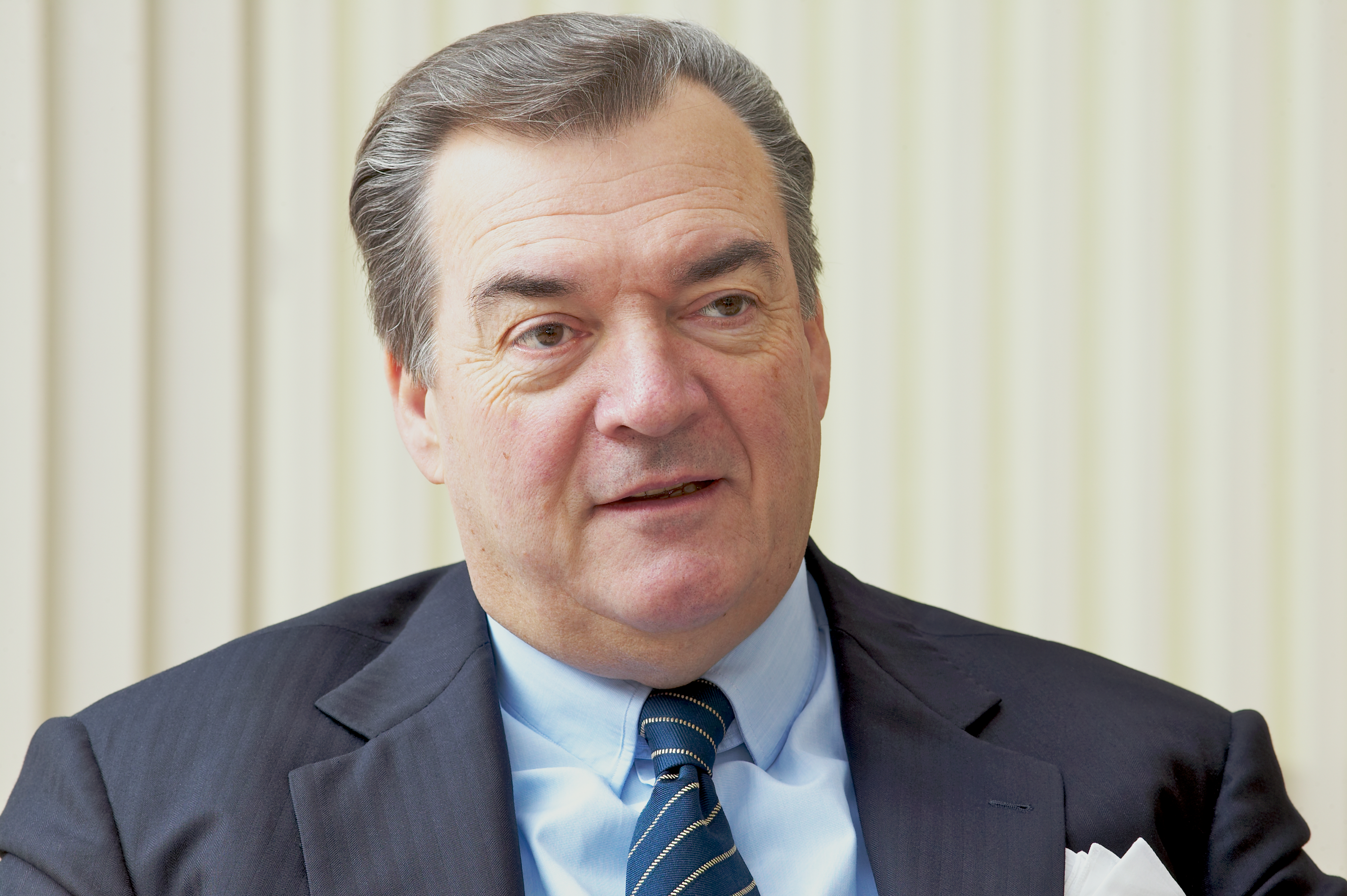
Henri Grethen

Henri Grethen (born 16 July 1950) is a politician from Luxembourg.

Grethen was born in Esch-sur-Alzette. He attended school in Echternach and studied in Luxembourg and Liège. In 1980, he became secretary of the Democratic Party, and in 1999, he became Minister for Economy and Transport.

He was Luxembourg's member of the European Court of Auditors from 2008 to 2019.

Political offices
Preceded by Robert Goebbels	Minister for the Economy; 1999 – 2004	Succeeded by Jeannot Krecké
Preceded by Mady Delvaux-Stehres	Minister for Transport; 1999 – 2004	Succeeded by Lucien Lux
