= Jeannot Krecké =

Luxembourgish footballer and politician

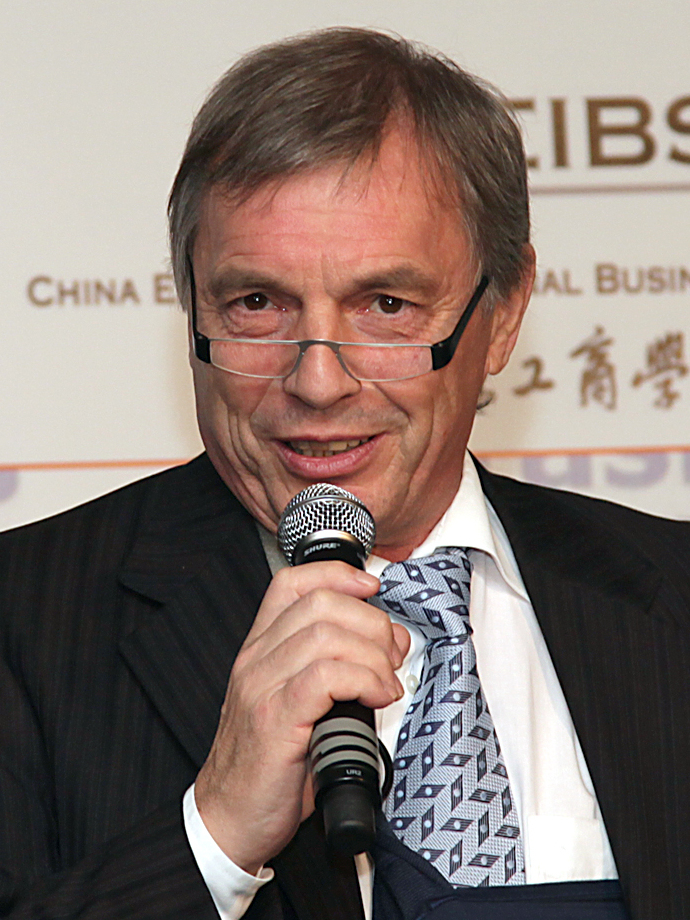
- Krecké in 2010

Minister for the Economy and Foreign Trade
- In office 2004–2012
- Prime Minister: Jean-Claude Juncker
- Preceded by: Henri Grethen
- Succeeded by: Etienne Schneider

Personal details
- Born: 26 April 1950 (age 76) Luxembourg
- Party: Luxembourg Socialist Workers' Party
Association football career
- Position: Midfielder
Senior career*
| Years | Team | Apps | (Gls) |
| 1968–1970 | Avenir Beggen | | |
| 1970–1971 | KSC Grimbergen | | |
| 1971–1972 | Avenir Beggen | | |
| 1973–1975 | Aris Bonnevoie | | |
| 1975–1977 | Etzella Ettelbruck | | |
| 1981–1982 | Progrès Niederkorn | | |
International career
| 1970–1977 | Luxembourg | 11 | (0) |
- * Club domestic league appearances and goals

Jeannot Krecké (born 26 April 1950) is a Luxembourgish politician of the Luxembourg Socialist Workers' Party. He is a former footballer.

== Football career ==
Krecké played football as a midfielder, and appeared 11 times for the Luxembourg national team.

== Political career ==
Krecké was a member of the Juncker-Asselborn I and II governments, holding the positions of Minister for the Economy and Foreign Trade and Minister for Sport. He was also a member of the Eurogroup from July 2004 to June 2009. He resigned from the latter on 1 February 2012.

Krecké resigned from the Cabinet and stepped down in February 2012.

== Later career ==
Krecké is currently the CEO of Key International Strategy Services. In addition, he holds the following positions:

- ArcelorMittal, Non-Executive Member of the Board of Directors
- Calzedonia Finanziaria SA, Member of the Board of Directors
- East-West United Bank SA, Member of the Board of Directors until February 2022
- Jan De Nul, Member of the Board of Directors
- NovEnergia, Member of the Management Team
- (formerly) Sistema, Member of the Board of Directors

Political offices
| Preceded by Henri Grethen | Minister for the Economy and Foreign Trade; 2004 – 2012 | Succeeded by Etienne Schneider |
