= Joseph Zangerle =

Luxembourgish footballer (1949–2022)

Personal information
- Date of birth: 6 November 1949
- Place of birth: Luxembourg City, Luxembourg
- Date of death: 12 January 2022 (aged 72)
- Position: Forward

Senior career*
Years	Team	Apps	(Gls)
1968–1969	Union Luxembourg		
1969–1970	R.W.D. Molenbeek		
1970–1979	Union Luxembourg		

International career
1968–1978	Luxembourg	11	(0)
- * Club domestic league appearances and goals

Joseph Zangerle (6 November 1949 – 12 January 2022) was a Luxembourgish footballer who played as a forward for R.W.D. Molenbeek and Union Luxembourg throughout the 1970s.

== Biography ==
Zangerle began his football career with Union Luxembourg of the Luxembourg National Division in 1968. Soon thereafter, he joined the Luxembourg national team and played his first game in a friendly match against Denmark in November 1968. In his rookie season, he won the Luxembourg Cup and subsequently signed with R.W.D. Molenbeek of the Belgian First Division, where he stayed for one season. In 1970, he returned to Union Luxembourg and returned the team to the top of the Luxembourg National Division in 1971.

With Union Luxembourg, Zangerle participated in the 1972 European Cup, where his team was eliminated in the preliminary round by Valencia. The team also qualified for the 1974 UEFA Cup, where they were eliminated by Marseille. After several years of poor performances, Zangerle and Union Luxembourg played in the 1979 European Cup Winners' Cup, where they were eliminated by FK Bodø/Glimt. He retired from football in 1979.

Zangerle died on 12 January 2022, at the age of 72.
