= Jean-Marie Kieffer =

Luxembourgish composer

Jean-Marie Kieffer (September 29, 1960 - March 8, 2023) was a Luxembourgish composer.
