= Emile Hemmen =

Luxembourgish writer (1923–2021)

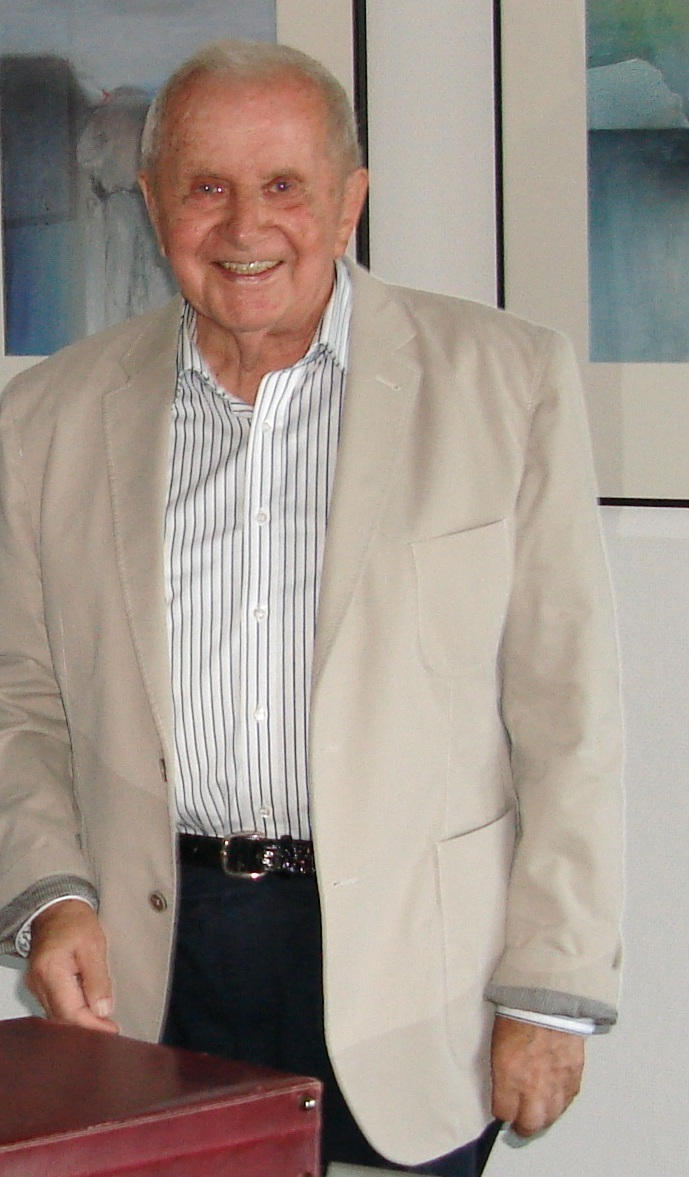
Emile Hemmen, 2008

Emile Hemmen (6 December 1923 – 8 January 2021) was a lyric poet and writer from Luxembourg who lived in Mondorf-les-Bains.

== Biography ==
Hemmen was born in Sandweiler in December 1923. In his youth, he refused to do military service for the German national socialist occupants and joined the resistance LPL "Lëtzebuerger Patrioteliga".

From 1945 to 1958, he worked as a teacher. Then he studied in Paris, specializing in psychology and sociology. He worked as an attaché for the Luxembourg Ministry of Education from 1968 to 1969.

Hemmen published over 40 works in French, German and Luxembourgish: a novel, short stories and numerous volumes of poetry. His work has been translated into several languages.es. He also contributed to many anthologies and literary magazines. Besides, he is one of the founders of Éditions Estuaires, one of the most important cultural magazines in the Grand Duchy of Luxembourg.

He died on 8 January, 2021 at the age of 97.

== Works ==
- Mei Wé (poems), 1948, 78 S., Imprimerie St. Paul
- Lîcht a Schied (novellas), 1950, 48 S., Imprimerie St. Paul
- Begegnungen, 1955, 22 S., Ney-Eicher, Esch-Uelzecht
- Die Maschine, 1956, 21 S., Ney-Eicher, Esch-Uelzecht
- Die Ratte, 1957, 12 S., Ney-Eicher, Esch-Uelzecht
- Ein Heimkehrer, 1958, 23 S., Ney-Eicher, Esch-Uelzecht
- 2 Novellen (Die Flut / Das Tier), 1959, 43 S., Ney-Eicher, Esch-Uelzecht
- 3 Novellen (Der Zeitungsmann / Die Erbin / Ein Tagebuch), 1960, Imprimerie Ney-Eicher, Esch-Uelzecht
- Gérard de Nerval, Novelle, 1960, Imprimerie Bourg-Bourger
- Innere Spuren (poems), 1981, 41 S., CDR / Cap
- A hauteur d'homme (poems), 1981, 122 S., CDR / Cap
- Messages croisés (poems), 1982, 41 S., CDR / Cap
- L'oeil-piège (poems), 1982, 71 S., CDR / Cap
- Ausschnitte (poems), 1982, 62 S., CDR / Cap
- Le temps d'un dire (poems), 1983, 71 S., CDR / Cap
- Souffles partagés, 1984, 30 S., Impr. Véré (Lille)
- Terre – racines with painter Roger Bertemes, Editions André Biren Paris 1986 (bibliophile edition)
- J'écoute tes yeux, 1989, with painter Henri Kraus / Editions PHI Echternach (bibliophile edition)
- Ballade en blanc, 1990, with painter François Schortgen / Editions de la Galerie de Luxembourg (bibliophile edition)
- Tambours, 1991, 95 S., with painter Emile Kirscht / Éd. Émile Borschette, Impr. J. Beffort (bibliophile edition)
- Au dire de l'arbre, 1991, with painter Raymond Weiland / Editions PHI Echternach (bibliophile edition)
- Feu de haute voix, Editions Alcatraz Press Auxerre France
- Heures de cendre (poems), 1996, 95 S., Michel Frères (Virton)
- Ciels sans abris, 1996, with painter Nico Thurm / Editions PHI Echternach (bibliophile edition)
- À te figer, lumière (poems), 1998, 95 S., Michel Frères (Virton)
- Die Wahl (novel), 2000, 390 S., Rapidpress (Bartreng), ISBN 2-87996-962-X
- Même souffle pour deux voix, 2000, with painter Marc Frising / Harlange / Luxembourg (bibliophile edition)
- White jeans, 2003, Editions Alpha Presse Sulzbach, Germany
- Relire le livre d'heures, 2003, Hudson River Press, New York
- Repainting memory, 2003, Poems, translated from French "Repeindre la mémoire" by Janine Goedert, Igneus Press, Bedford New Hampshire printed in the United States of America
- A l'heure des sources, 2004, with painter Georges Le Bayon Editions Buschmann, Trèves (bibliophile edition)
- Histoires de soifs (poems), 2004, 90 S., Éd. Phi, Esch-Uelzecht, ISBN 2-87962-189-5
- Jeux de pistes – Fährtenspiele, 2006, 155 S., Verl. im Wald (Rimbach), ISBN 978-3-929208-85-6
- L'Arbre chauve, 2007, Editions Estuaire Collection 99, ISBN 978-2-9599704-2-9
- Anthologie Emile Hemmen, Poète, 2008, Editions mediArt, ISBN 978-2-9599-749-7-7
- Derniers retranchements, 2011, Livre d'artiste edited by mediArt, with painter François Schortgen (bibliophile edition)
- Treibholz, 2011, Gedichtzyklus, Editions Alpha Presse Sulzbach, Germany, with CD "Die Sprechdose" (piano recording by Kasia Lewandowska)
- Aus dem nackten Schweigen gehen, 2013, poetry cycle by Emile Hemmen, prints by Petra M. Lorenz, pelo paperart, Editions S'Art S.A., Palma de Mallorca
- Nocturnes, 2013, poems Emile Hemmen, CD "Nocturnes – Fréderic Chopin" interpreted by Romain Nosbaum at Centre Culturel de rencontre Abbaye Neumünster in August 2013 Editions mediArt ISBN 978-99959-817-1-6
- Dans le miroir du temps, 2014, Editions Estuaires Collection Hors série N°4, ISBN 978-99959-749-3-0

== Publications in anthologies ==
- 1952 Livre d'Or de la Résistance Luxembourgeoise 1940–1945 S.519 Luxembourg
- 1955 Rappel de la Résistance du 15 au 22 mai LPPD (Ligue vun de Politeschen Prisonnéier an Déportéerten Luxembourg)
- 1967 Geschichte der Luxemburger Mundartdichtung 2ter Band S.213 Luxembourg
- 1968 Almanach Culturel Luxembourg
- 1972 Rappel – 25 Joer LPPD Luxembourg
- 1978 Droits de l'Homme /Amnesty International Luxembourg
- 1983 Au-delà du désespoir/ Centre de Réadaptation Capellen Luxembourg
- 1984 Dialogues / Centre de Réadaptation Capellen Luxembourg
- 1985 Partages / Centre de Réadaptation Capellen Luxembourg ( 3 Éditions de luxe- Conception littéraire: Emile Hemmen)
- 1985 Die Ganze Welt Anthologie (BECb CBET) Russia1988 Poems from Luxembembourg / Moscou
- 1992 La poésie luxembourgeoise contemporaine / Struga / Macédonia
- 1995 Intercity (anthologie en trois langues) éditée par le "Lëtzeburger Schrëftstellerverband" Luxembourg
- 1997 journées littéraires de Mondorf Luxembourg
- 1999 Randwort / Saarbrücker Literaturtage Germany
- 1999 Anthologie Luxembourgeoise de Jean Portante / Écrits des Forges (Canada) et Éditions Phi (Luxembourg)
- 1999 La Francophonie du Grand-Duché de Luxembourg / Europe Centre – Orientale de Frank Wilhelm
- 2000 Devant le monde, le poète / Éditions Alzieu – France
- 2004 Anthologie de littérature luxembourgeoise de langue française / Roumania
- 2005 Le Mur / Éditions ESTUAIRES Luxembourg
- 2006 La femme dans la littérature au Luxembourg / Initiative "Plaisir de lire" Luxembourg
- 2007 Quatre artistes, quatre poètes, quatre pays, quatre saisons x 3 Éditions mediArt -Le migrateur sourcier Luxembourg
- 2008 Résistance aux guerres par animation Globale du Luxembourg Belgique – Témoignage poème.
- 2011 Kolléisch's Jongen am Krich / S. 333 Réminiscences. Luxembourg
- 2016 L'Alchimie des pigments / média graphique à Rennes / Éditions Folle Avoine Yves prié / France
- 2016 L'Alchimie des pigments / média graphique à Rennes / Éditions Folle Avoine Yves prié /

== Publications in magazines ==
- 1948 -1981 Rappel de la Résistance du 15 au 21 mai Luxembourg
- 1960 Le Phare pages culturelles du Tageblatt Luxembourg
- 1983 An Dann Capellen Luxembourg
- 1985 BECb CBET Moscou
- 1986 – 2009 Revue Estuaires Luxembourg
- 1988 Du verbe à l'acte Luxembourg
- 1988 Revue Alsacienne France
- 1989 mémorial Publication Mosellane / Éditions Martin Gerges Luxembourg
- 1991 Orée France
- 1992 Pollen d'Azur N°2 France
- 1992 Revue macédonienne Struga Macedonia
- 1994 Les Cahiers luxembourgeois Luxembourg
- 1994 Die Brücke N° 96 Germany
- 1995 Totem Éléphant France
- 1996 Journal des Poètes Belgium
- 1997 Pollen d'Azur Belgium
- 1998 L'Arme de l'écriture France
- 1999 The Café review USA
- 2000 L'Arme de l'écriture France
- 2000 Das Gedicht Germany
- 2001 Mir perewoda St. Petersbourg Russia
- 2001 Le matin déboutonné N°2+3 France
- 2002 ESTUAIRES N° 44+45 Luxembourg
- 2002 The Love Book USA
- 2004 Comme une promesse Luxembourg
- 2005 Le Mur édition de tête Luxembourg
- 2007 Matrix Germany
- 2007 réCré Éditions Apess Luxembourg
- 2007 Les Cahiers de Poésie France
- 2007 Spéred Gouez N°14 Bretagne France
- 2007 Transilvania Roumania

== CD / movie / musical compositions ==
- 1950 musical composition from the pianist and composer Pierre Nimax Sr. various poems from Emile Hemmen
- 2011 / CD Alpha Presse Sulzbach Germany / Die Sprechdose / Klangschale / Piano admission by Kasia Lewandowska interprets
- 2013 Nocturne / Poems from Emile Hemmen ISBN 978 99959-817-1- 6 Éditions médiArt – Musek Nocturnes by Frédéric Chopin – interprets by pianist Romain Nosbaum at Centre Culturel Abbaye Neumünster Luxembourg
- 2016 CNL -Poems set to music asbl. Noise Watchers Unlimited Composer Jean Halsdorf / Poem Nocturne VI taken from Nocturne E. H. world creation by Laurie Dondelinger / soprano and Annie Kraus
- Film "Heim ins Reich" director Claude Lahr Luxembourg documentary subsidized by l'UNESCO testimony by Emile Hemmen, résistant – réfractaire under German occupation 1940–1944

== Literature ==
- Frank Wilhelm: Emile Hemmen. Poète; MediArt, 2008, 240 S.; [[:lb:Spezial:Bicher mat hirer ISBN sichen/9782959974977|ISBN 978-2-9599749-7-7]]
- Laurent Fels, Gaspard Hons, Paul Mathieu, Marcel Migozzi et René Welter: Emile Hemmen; Encres Vives, 2014.
