= List of ministers for the economy and foreign trade of Luxembourg =

The minister for the economy and foreign trade (French: ministre de l'économie et du commerce extérieur) is a position in the government of Luxembourg, either by itself or combined with other positions, since 15 July 1964.

From 15 July 1964 until 6 February 1969, it was known as the Minister for the National Economy and Energy (French: Ministre de l'Économie nationale et de l’Énergie). In 1969, the Energy brief was separated and recombined with that of the Minister for Transport, leaving the Economy brief to amalgamate with others to create the post of Minister for the National Economy, Middle Class, and Tourism (French: Ministre de l'Économie nationale, des Classes moyennes et du Tourisme). Tourism was separated from 16 September 1977, creating the Minister for the National Economy and the Middle Class (French: Ministre de l'Économie nationale et des Classes moyennes). The position of Minister for the Economy (French: Ministre de l'Économie) was created on 14 July 1989, as it remained since, despite the role's absorption of other responsibilities. In 2009, it was renamed to the current 'Minister for the Economy and Foreign Trade'.

== List of ministers for the economy ==
Minister	Party	Start date	End date	Prime Minister
Antoine Wehenkel	LSAP	15 July 1964	6 February 1969	Pierre Werner
Marcel Mart	DP	6 February 1969	15 June 1974	Pierre Werner
Marcel Mart	DP	15 June 1974	16 September 1977	Gaston Thorn
Gaston Thorn	DP	16 September 1977	16 July 1979	Gaston Thorn
Gaston Thorn	DP	16 July 1979	22 November 1980	Pierre Werner
Colette Flesch	DP	22 November 1980	20 July 1984	Pierre Werner
Jacques Poos	LSAP	20 July 1984	14 July 1989	Jacques Santer
Robert Goebbels	LSAP	14 July 1989	26 January 1995	Jacques Santer
Robert Goebbels	LSAP	26 January 1995	7 August 1999	Jean-Claude Juncker
Henri Grethen	DP	7 August 1999	31 July 2004	Jean-Claude Juncker
Jeannot Krecké	LSAP	31 July 2004	1 February 2012	Jean-Claude Juncker
Etienne Schneider	LSAP	1 February 2012	4 December 2013	Jean-Claude Juncker
Etienne Schneider	LSAP	4 December 2013	4 February 2020	Xavier Bettel
Franz Fayot	LSAP	4 February 2020	17 November 2023	Xavier Bettel
Lex Delles	DP	17 November 2023	Incumbent	Luc Frieden
