= Robert Goebbels =

Luxembourgish politician (1944–2026)

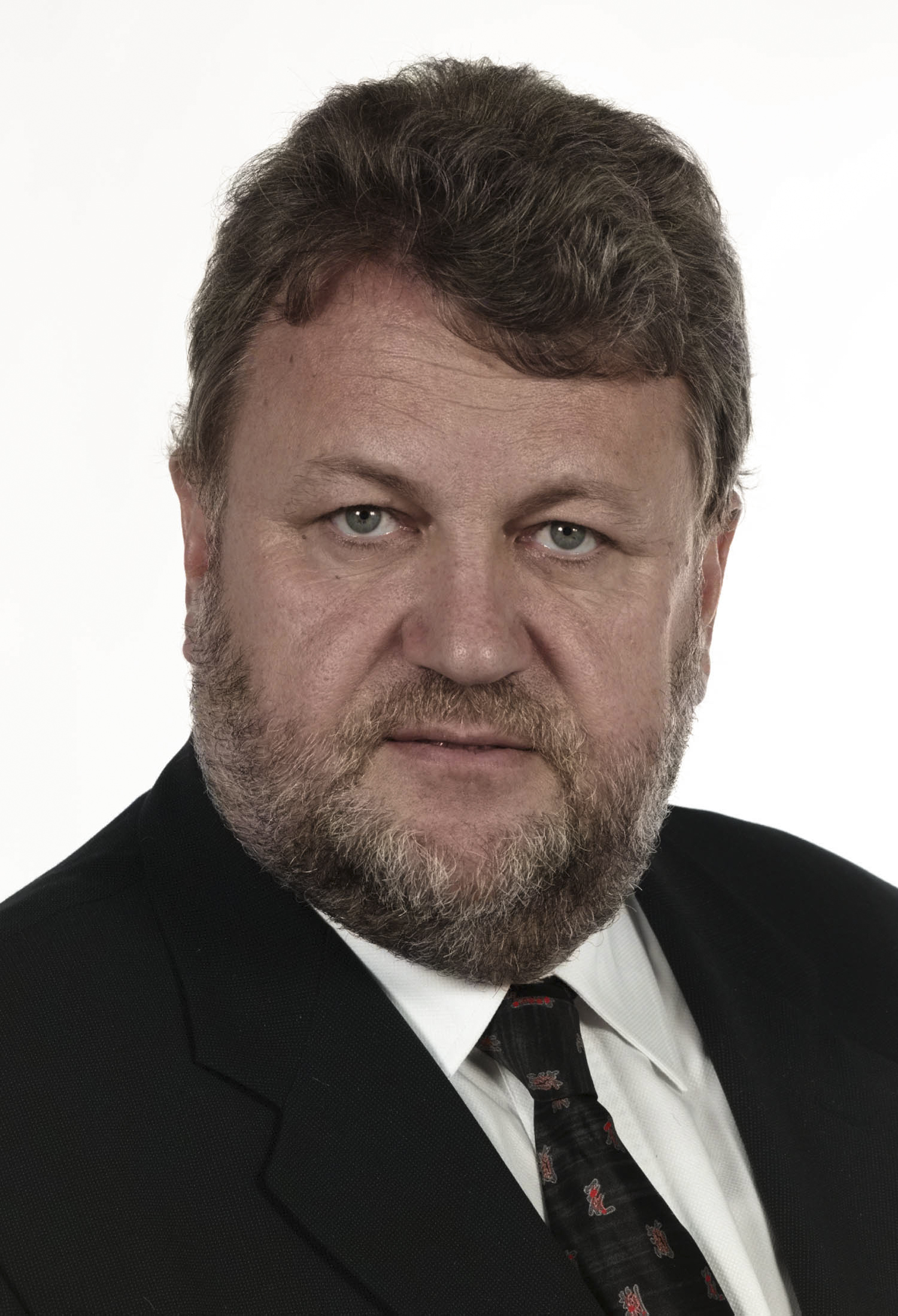
- Official portrait, 1999

Member of the European Parliament
- In office 20 July 1999 – 17 April 2014
- Constituency: Luxembourg

Minister for Energy
- In office 13 July 1994 – 7 August 1999
- Prime Minister: Jacques Santer; Jean-Claude Juncker
- Preceded by: Alex Bodry
- Succeeded by: Position abolished

Minister for the Economy
- In office 14 July 1989 – 7 August 1999
- Prime Minister: Jacques Santer; Jean-Claude Juncker
- Preceded by: Jacques Poos
- Succeeded by: Henri Grethen

Minister for Public Works Minister for Transport
- In office 14 July 1989 – 7 August 1999
- Prime Minister: Jacques Santer; Jean-Claude Juncker
- Preceded by: Marcel Schlechter
- Succeeded by: Erna Hennicot-Schoepges (Public Works); Mady Delvaux-Stehres (Transport)

Secretary of State for Foreign Affairs, Foreign Trade, and Cooperation Secretary of State for the Middle Class
- In office 20 July 1984 – 14 July 1989
- Prime Minister: Jacques Santer
- Preceded by: Paul Helminger
- Succeeded by: Georges Wohlfart

Personal details
- Born: 3 April 1944 Luxembourg City, Luxembourg
- Died: 5 January 2026 (aged 81) Saint Vincent and the Grenadines
- Party: Luxembourg Socialist Workers' Party
- Other political affiliations: Party of European Socialists
- Spouse: Annette Luck (d. 2024)

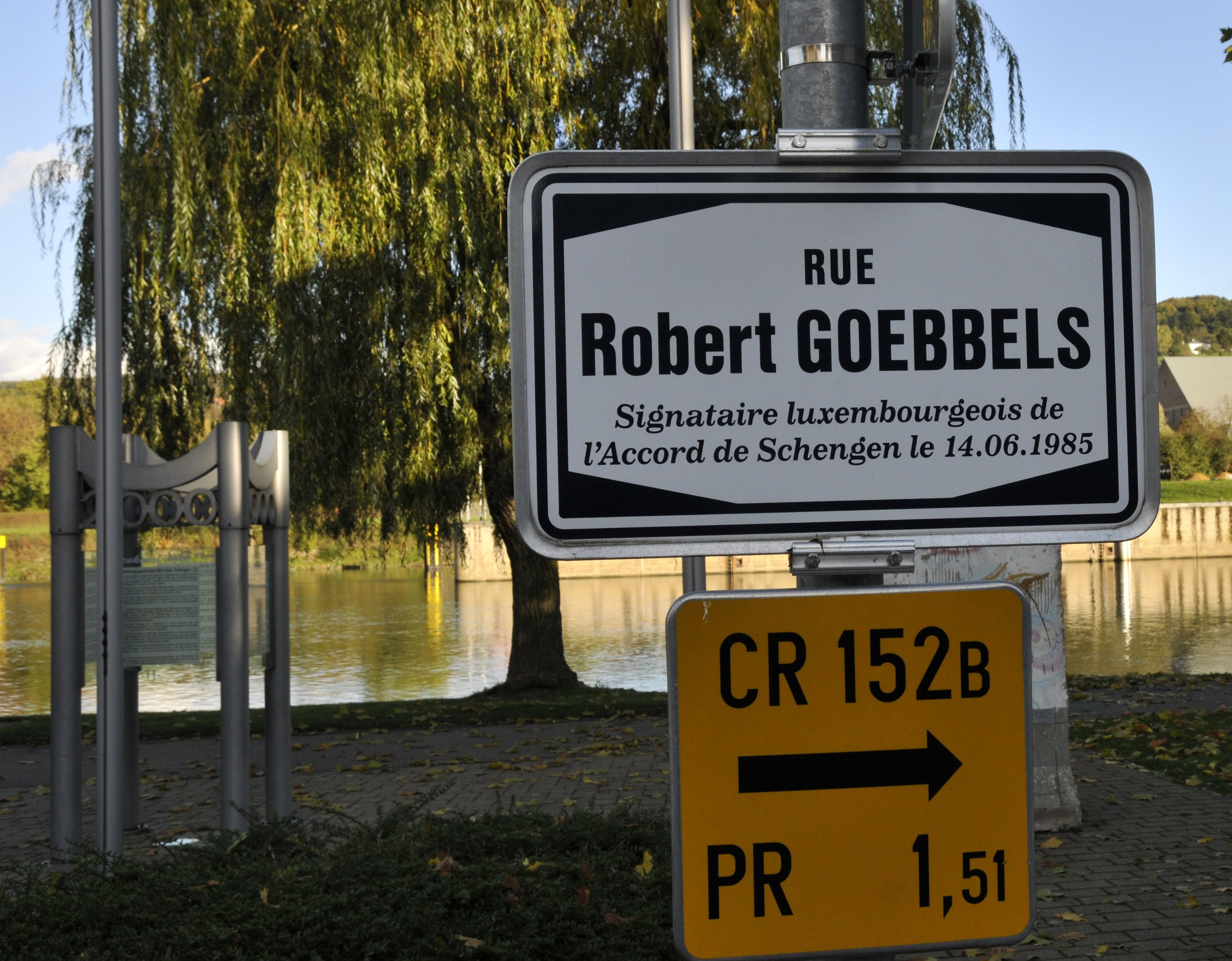
Rue Robert Goebbels (Robert Goebbels Street) in Schengen

Robert Goebbels (3 April 1944 – 5 January 2026) was a Luxembourgish journalist and politician. A member of the Luxembourg Socialist Workers' Party (LSAP), he served as a member of successive coalition governments under Jacques Santer and Jean-Claude Juncker from 1984 to 1999. In 1985, as Secretary of State for Foreign Affairs, he was a signatory of the Schengen Agreement on behalf of Luxembourg.

Following the 1999 general election, after which the LSAP entered the opposition, Goebbels was elected to the European Parliament, in which he served as a member until his retirement from politics in 2014.

== Career ==
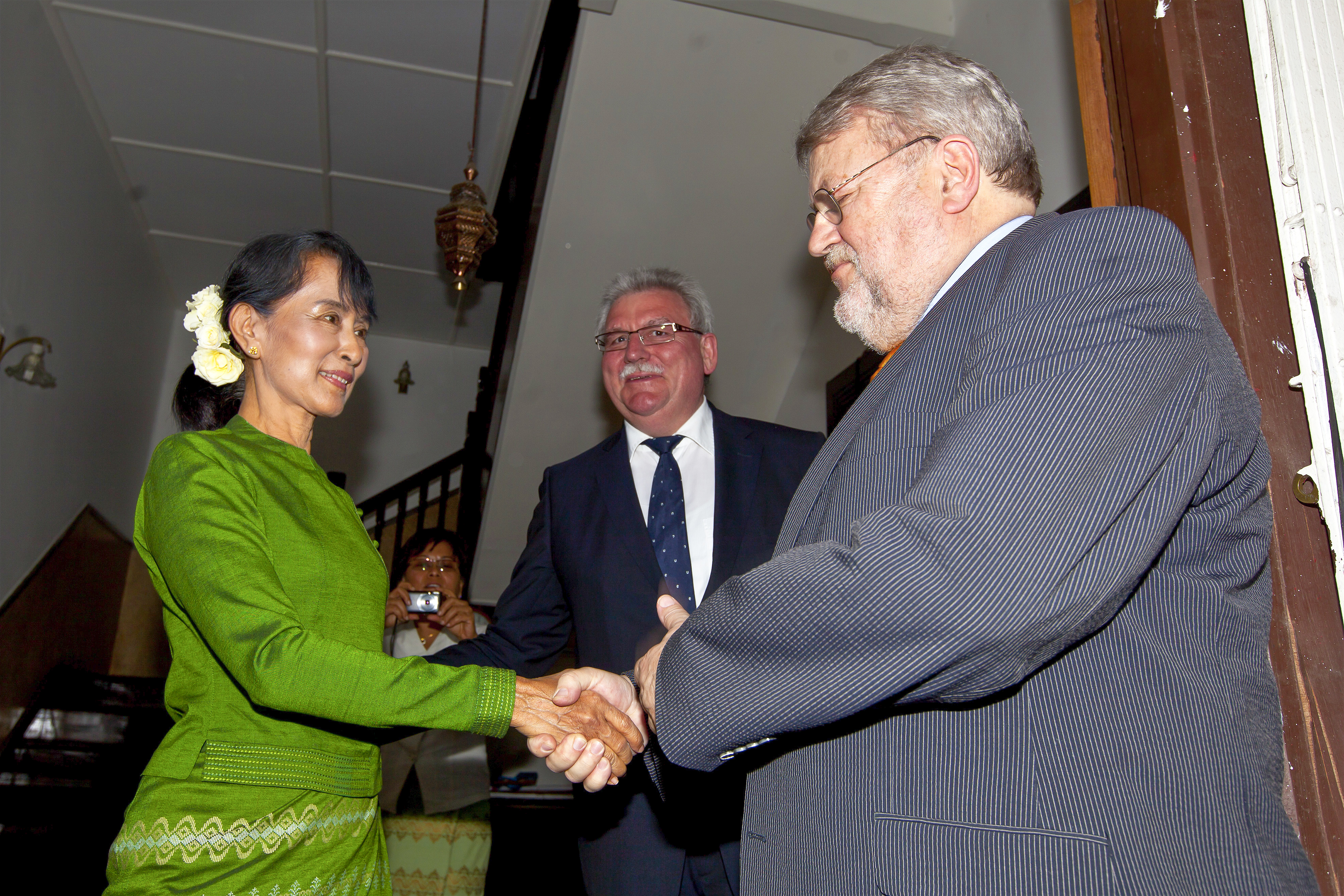
Goebbels meeting Aung San Suu Kyi in 2012

Goebbels started his career as one of the editors in charge of international affairs in a Luxembourg daily. From 1972 to 1974 he was elected three times chairman of the Luxembourg Association of Journalists.

His political career started as president of the Young Socialists in 1969. He was elected secretary general of the Luxembourg Socialist Workers' Party in 1971 and regularly re-elected up to 1984.

In 1976, Goebbels was elected to the City Council of Luxembourg, and re-elected later on for three additional mandates.

In 1984, Goebbels was elected to the Chamber of Deputies. He would go on to be re-elected four times. That same year, he was appointed to the Government as Secretary of State for Foreign Affairs, International Trade and Development Cooperation and as Secretary of State for Economic Affairs.

From 1984 to 1989, Goebbels attended numerous ASEAN post-ministerial conferences and co-chaired in 1985 in Bangkok the first ASEAN-EU Conference on Economic Affairs.

In 1985, Goebbels was invited to the signing of the first Schengen Agreement. In the following years he was Luxembourg's negotiator for the Schengen Convention of 1990.

In 1986, Goebbels signed for Luxembourg the European Single Act, which launched the European single market.

In 1986, Goebbels was also appointed vice-chairman of the GATT-Conference in Punta del Este, which launched the Uruguay Round.

In 1989, Goebbels was appointed Minister of the Economy, Minister of Public Works, and Minister of Transport. In the last capacity he chaired the European Conference of Ministers of Transport.

In 1994, Goebbels was appointed Minister of the Economy, Minister of Energy, and Minister of Public Works. As a member of the Ecofin-Council of the EU he was involved in the launching of the Euro.

In 1999, Goebbels was elected to the European Parliament, re-elected in 2004 and 2009.

From 1999 to 2009, Goebbels served as vice-chair of the Socialist Group in the European Parliament, and as spokesperson of his group on Economic and Monetary Affairs. In addition he chaired the Lisbon network on Growth and Investments of the European Socialist Party. In 2001 Goebbels was elected chairman of the Committee on Human Genetics of the European Parliament.

In 2006, Goebbels was appointed by the Government as High Commissioner for the Luxembourg Pavilion at the Shanghai World Expo 2010.

In his 15 years in the European Parliament, Goebbels was rapporteur or co-rapporteur of numerous European legislations.

Goebbels was a member of the ACP-EU joint Parliamentary Assembly and a member of the EP-Delegation to the ASEAN countries. From 2009 to 2014 he served as first vice-president of the EP-delegation to ASEAN and attended in that capacity most of the meetings of the ASEAN Inter Parliamentary Assembly. In 2014 he was appointed EP-Member of the EU-task force for Myanmar. He served also in 2014 as chair of the EP observation-mission to the presidential elections in Egypt.

In July 2014, Goebbels retired from active politics. He continued to publish articles in the national and international press.

In March 2016, the Luxembourg Government appointed Goebbels as the Luxembourg representative to the ASEF Board of Governors.

== Death ==
Goebbels died on 5 January 2026, at the age of 81, while abroad in Saint Vincent and the Grenadines. Those who paid tribute to him included former prime minister Jacques Santer, who praised him as a "dynamic activist" who had "brought a new dimension to Luxembourg", and former President of the Chamber of Deputies Mars Di Bartolomeo, who remembered Goebbels as "a good socialist, a man with backbone and convictions, a pragmatist, a free thinker".

Political offices
Preceded by Jacques Poos	Minister for the Economy; 1989–1999	Succeeded by Henri Grethen
Preceded by Marcel Schlechter	Minister for Public Works; 1989–1999	Succeeded by Erna Hennicot-Schoepges
Preceded by Marcel Schlechter	Minister for Transport; 1989–1994	Succeeded by Mady Delvaux-Stehres
Preceded by Alex Bodry	Minister for Energy; 1994–1999	Merged into Minister for the Economy
