= Dan Kersch =

Luxembourgish politician

Daniel Kersch
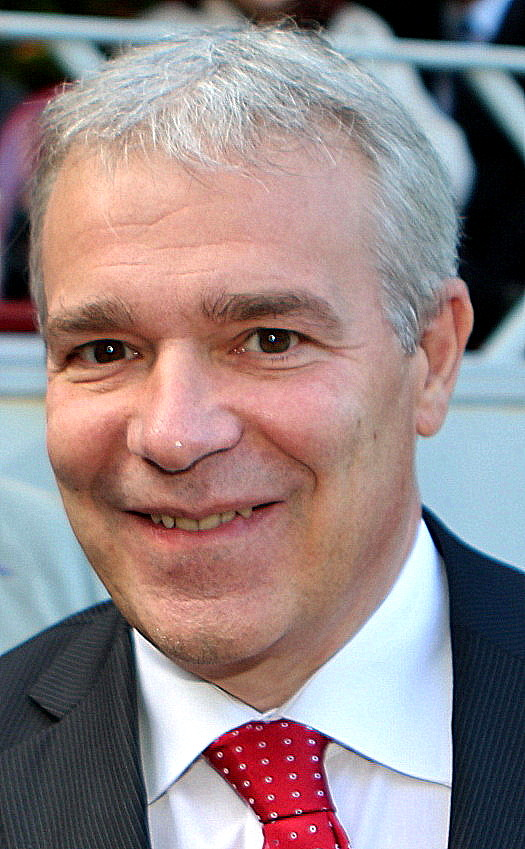
- Kersch in 2015.

Deputy Prime Minister of Luxembourg
- In office 4 February 2020 – 5 January 2022 Serving with François Bausch
- Prime Minister: Xavier Bettel
- Preceded by: Etienne Schneider
- Succeeded by: Paulette Lenert

Personal details
- Born: 27 December 1961 (age 64)
- Party: Luxembourg Socialist Workers' Party

Daniel Kersch (born 27 December 1961) is a Luxembourgish politician. He served as Minister of Sport and Minister of Labour, Employment and the Social and Solidarity Economy in the Bettel II Government.
