= COVID-19 pandemic in Luxembourg =

Aspect of viral disease pandemic

- Evolution of the pandemic in Luxembourg
- Disease: COVID-19
- Pathogen: SARS-CoV-2
- Location: Luxembourg
- First outbreak: Wuhan, Hubei, China
- Index case: Luxembourg City
- Arrival date: 29 February 2020 (6 years, 7 months and 5 days)
- Confirmed cases: 401,725
- Deaths: 1,000
- Fatality rate: 0.25%
- Vaccinations: 481,957

Government website
- gouvernement.lu/coronavirus

The COVID-19 pandemic in Luxembourg is part of the worldwide pandemic of coronavirus disease 2019 (COVID-19) caused by severe acute respiratory syndrome coronavirus 2 (SARS-CoV-2). The virus was confirmed to have reached Luxembourg on 29 February 2020. As of 18 September 2026, there are 401,725 confirmed cases, with 1,000 deaths in Luxembourg.

== Background ==
On 12 January, the World Health Organization (WHO) confirmed that a novel coronavirus was the cause of a respiratory illness in a cluster of people in Wuhan City, Hubei Province, China, who had initially come to the attention of the WHO on 31 December 2019.

Unlike SARS of 2003, the case fatality ratio for COVID-19 has been much lower, but the transmission has been significantly greater, with a significant total death toll.

== Timeline ==
=== February 2020 ===
On 29 February the Ministry of Health of Luxembourg confirmed the first case of the coronavirus in the country. The patient was a man in his forties who had returned from Italy via Charleroi, Belgium. He reported himself to the Sanitary Inspection Unit and was placed in quarantine at the Centre Hospitalier de Luxembourg in Luxembourg City.

=== March 2020 ===
On 5 March a man returned from northern Italy and was tested positive for the virus. He was put in quarantine at the Centre Hospitalier de Luxembourg.

On 6 March a woman was confirmed with the virus after staying in the Alsace region in France, bringing the total number of confirmed cases to 3.

On the evening of 7 March the Ministry of Health confirmed another case of coronavirus in the country, stating that the infected person had an "epidemiological link" with northern Italy.

On 8 March, another case was confirmed, with an infected patient who had recently returned from the Alsace region in France.

On 10 March, two cases were confirmed simultaneously, with one returning home from the United States and one returning from Switzerland.

On 12 March, the Ministry of Health confirmed 19 new cases in Luxembourg, bringing the total number of cases to 26, with a 94-year-old in critical condition. According to the ministry, two of the patients were infected in Luxembourg while the other 10 got infected abroad. One of the cases was diagnosed at Kirchberg Hospital, and since then the hospital has implemented numerous precautionary measures, including limiting patient visits, only hospital staff can reserve parking spaces being reserved for hospital staff only, outpatient consultations being substantially reduced, and controlled access at the main entrance. The ministry also announced that schools would close from 16 to 27 March following the recent number of cases in Luxembourg.

On 13 March, Minister for Health Paulette Lenert, Minister for Mobility François Bausch, and Minister for Family Affairs Corinne Cahen held a press conference to confirm another 8 cases and Luxembourg's first death, which was a 94-year-old who had been in critical condition.

On 14 March, the Ministry of Health confirmed 17 more cases, bringing the total number of cases in Luxembourg to 51. Paulette Lenert stated, "the virus has arrived," adding that the situation was starting to become "critical" and "unprecedented".

On 15 March, Lenert and Prime Minister of Luxembourg Xavier Bettel held a press briefing confirming 26 more cases in Luxembourg, bringing the total number of confirmed cases to 77. They stated that most non-food shops and restaurants would close at midnight following the spike in cases. Among non-food business permitted to remain open were post offices, banks and animal feed stores. It was also decreed that buses would not open their front doors and that passengers had to get on at the rear of the bus; also, the front row of seats on all buses were physically blocked off with tape or chains.

On 16 March, the Ministry of Health confirmed 4 more cases, bringing the total number of cases to 81.

On 17 March, the Ministry of Health confirmed 59 new cases, bringing the total number of cases to 140.

On 18 March, the Ministry of Health confirmed 62 new cases, bringing the total number of cases to 203, with another death in the country.

On 19 March, the Ministry of Health confirmed 132 new cases, bringing the total number to 335, with a total of 4 deaths. Bettel declared a state of emergency. Later in the day, Lenert held a press conference, stating that all deaths were patients above the age of 80 and that 6 people had recovered so far.

On 20 March, the Ministry of Health confirmed 149 new cases, bringing the total number to 484 (the ministry web page had erroneously reported a figure of 618 earlier in the day). Public transport services were significantly reduced, with trains running once an hour instead of four times an hour on some lines, and all Sunday services for trams and regional buses cancelled.

On 21 March, the Ministry of Health confirmed 186 new cases, bringing the total number to 670. The ministry of Health also raised the number of total deaths to 8.

On 22 March, the Ministry of Health confirmed 128 new cases, bringing the total number to 798.

On 23 March, the Ministry of Health confirmed 77 new cases with the total number reaching 875.

On 24 March, the Ministry of Health confirmed 224 new cases with the total number reaching 1,099.

On 25 March, at a press conference Bettel confirmed 234 new cases with the total number reaching 1,333.

On 26 March, the Ministry of Health confirmed 120 new cases with the total number reaching 1,453 with another death in the country.

On 27 March, the Ministry of Health confirmed 152 new cases for a total number of 1,605 with 6 more deaths bringing the total number of deaths to 15. 34 people are to said to have recovered from the virus.

On 28 March, the Ministry of Health confirmed 226 new cases bringing the total number of cases to 1,831 with 3 more deaths in the country.

On 29 March, the Ministry of Health confirmed 119 more cases bringing the total number of cases to 1,950 while 3 more deaths were confirmed.

On 30 March, the Ministry of Health confirmed 38 more cases bringing the total number of cases to 1,988 while 1 more death was confirmed.

On 31 March, the Ministry of Health confirmed 190 more cases bringing the total number of cases to 2,178 while 1 more death was confirmed.

=== April 2020 ===
On 1 April, the Ministry of Health confirmed 141 more cases bringing the total number of cases to 2,319 while 6 more deaths were confirmed.

On 2 April, the Ministry of Health confirmed 168 more cases bringing the total number of cases to 2,487 while 1 more death was confirmed.

On 3 April, the Ministry of Health confirmed 125 more cases bringing the total number of cases to 2,612 while 1 more death was confirmed.

On 4 April, the Ministry of Health confirmed 117 new cases, bringing the total number to 2,729.

On 5 April, the Ministry of Health confirmed 75 more cases bringing the total number of cases to 2,804 while 5 more deaths were confirmed.

On 6 April, the Ministry of Health confirmed 39 more cases bringing the total number of cases to 2,843 while 5 more deaths were confirmed.

On 7 April, the Ministry of Health confirmed 127 more cases bringing the total number of cases to 2,970 while 3 more deaths were confirmed.

On 8 April, the Ministry of Health confirmed 64 more cases bringing the total number of cases to 3,034 while 2 more deaths were confirmed.

On 9 April, the Ministry of Health confirmed 81 more cases bringing the total number of cases to 3,115 while the number of dead increased from 46 to 52.

On 10 April, the Ministry of Health confirmed 108 more cases bringing the total number of cases to 3,223 while 2 more deaths were confirmed.

On 11 April, the Ministry of Health confirmed 47 more cases bringing the total number of cases to 3,270 while the number of dead increased to 62.

On 12 April, the Ministry of Health confirmed 11 more cases bringing the total number of cases to 3,281 while 4 more deaths were confirmed.

On 13 April, the Ministry of Health confirmed 11 more cases bringing the total number of cases to 3,292 while 3 more deaths were confirmed.

On 14 April, the Ministry of Health confirmed 15 more cases bringing the total number of cases to 3,307. The death toll has been revised from 69 to 67.

On 15 April, the Ministry of Health confirmed 66 more cases bringing the total number of cases to 3,373 while 2 more deaths were confirmed.

On 16 April, the Ministry of Health confirmed 71 more cases bringing the total number of cases to 3,444. The death toll was revised down by 1, to 68.

On 17 April, the Ministry of Health confirmed 36 more cases bringing the total number of cases to 3,480 while 4 more deaths were confirmed.

On 18 April, the Ministry of Health confirmed 57 more cases bringing the total number of cases to 3,537.

On 19 April, the Ministry of Health confirmed 13 more cases bringing the total number of cases to 3,550 while 1 more death was confirmed.

On 20 April, the Ministry of Health confirmed 8 more cases bringing the total number of cases to 3,558 while 2 more deaths were confirmed.

On 21 April, the Ministry of Health confirmed 60 more cases bringing the total number of cases to 3,618 while 3 more deaths were confirmed.

On 22 April, the Ministry of Health confirmed 36 more cases bringing the total number of cases to 3,654 while 2 more deaths were confirmed.

On 23 April, the Ministry of Health confirmed 11 more cases bringing the total number of cases to 3,665 while 3 more deaths were confirmed.

On 24 April, the Ministry of Health confirmed 30 more cases bringing the total number of cases to 3,695 while 2 more deaths were confirmed.

On 25 April, the Ministry of Health confirmed 16 more cases bringing the total number of cases to 3,711.

On 26 April, the Ministry of Health confirmed 12 more cases bringing the total number of cases to 3,723 while 3 more deaths were confirmed.

On 27 April, the Ministry of Health confirmed 6 more cases bringing the total number of cases to 3,729.

On 28 April, the Ministry of Health confirmed 12 more cases bringing the total number of cases to 3,741 while 1 more death was confirmed.

On 29 April, the Ministry of Health confirmed 28 more cases bringing the total number of cases to 3,769.

On 30 April, the Ministry of Health confirmed 15 more cases bringing the total number of cases to 3,784 while 1 more death was confirmed, bringing the total to 90.

=== May 2020 ===
On 1 May, the Ministry of Health confirmed 18 more cases bringing the total number of cases to 3,802 while 2 more deaths were confirmed.

On 2 May, the Ministry of Health confirmed 10 more cases bringing the total number of cases to 3,812.

On 3 May, the Ministry of Health confirmed 12 more cases bringing the total number of cases to 3,824 while 4 more deaths were confirmed.

On 4 May, the Ministry of Health confirmed 4 more cases bringing the total number of cases to 3,828.

On 5 May, the Ministry of Health confirmed 12 more cases bringing the total number of cases to 3,840.

On 6 May, the Ministry of Health confirmed 11 more cases bringing the total number of cases to 3,851 while 2 more deaths were confirmed.

On 7 May, the Ministry of Health confirmed 8 more cases bringing the total number of cases to 3,859 while 2 more deaths were confirmed.

On 8 May, the Ministry of Health confirmed 12 more cases bringing the total number of cases to 3,871.

On 9 May, the Ministry of Health confirmed 6 more cases bringing the total number of cases to 3,877 while 1 more death was confirmed.

On 10 May, the Ministry of Health confirmed 9 more cases bringing the total number of cases to 3,886.

On 11 May, the Ministry of Health confirmed 2 more cases bringing the total number of cases to 3,888.

On 12 May, the Ministry of Health confirmed 6 more cases bringing the total number of cases to 3,894 while 1 more death was confirmed.

On 13 May, the Ministry of Health confirmed 10 more cases bringing the total number of cases to 3,904 while 1 more death was confirmed.

On 14 May, the Ministry of Health confirmed 11 more cases bringing the total number of cases to 3,915.

On 15 May, the Ministry of Health confirmed 8 more cases bringing the total number of cases to 3,923 while 1 more death was confirmed.

On 16 May, the Ministry of Health confirmed 7 more cases bringing the total number of cases to 3,930.

On 17 May, the Ministry of Health confirmed 15 more cases bringing the total number of cases to 3,945 while 3 more deaths were confirmed.

On 18 May, the Ministry of Health confirmed 2 more cases bringing the total number of cases to 3,947.

On 19 May, the Ministry of Health confirmed 11 more cases bringing the total number of cases to 3,958 while 2 more deaths were confirmed.

On 20 May, the Ministry of Health confirmed 13 more cases bringing the total number of cases to 3,971.

On 21 May, the Ministry of Health confirmed 9 more cases bringing the total number of cases to 3,980.

On 22 May, the Ministry of Health confirmed 1 more case bringing the total number of cases to 3,981.

On 23 May, the Ministry of Health confirmed 9 more cases bringing the total number of cases to 3,990.

On 24 May, the Ministry of Health confirmed 2 more cases bringing the total number of cases to 3,992 while 1 more death was confirmed.

On 25 May, the Ministry of Health confirmed 1 more case bringing the total number of cases to 3,993.

On 26 May, the Ministry of Health confirmed 2 more cases bringing the total number of cases to 3,995.

On 27 May, the Ministry of Health confirmed 6 more cases bringing the total number of cases to 4,001.

On 28 May, the Ministry of Health confirmed 7 more cases bringing the total number of cases to 4,008.

On 29 May, the Ministry of Health confirmed 4 more cases bringing the total number of cases to 4,012.

On 30 May, the Ministry of Health confirmed 4 more cases bringing the total number of cases to 4,016.

On 31 May, the Ministry of Health confirmed 2 more cases bringing the total number of cases to 4,018.

=== June 2020 ===
On 1 June, the Ministry of Health confirmed 1 more case bringing the total number of cases to 4,019.

On 2 June, the Ministry of Health confirmed 1 more case bringing the total number of cases to 4,020.

On 3 June, the Ministry of Health confirmed 4 more cases bringing the total number of cases to 4,024.

On 4 June, the Ministry of Health confirmed 3 more cases bringing the total number of cases to 4,027.

On 5 June, the Ministry of Health confirmed 5 more cases bringing the total number of cases to 4,032.

On 6 June, the Ministry of Health confirmed 3 more cases bringing the total number of cases to 4,035.

On 7 June, the Ministry of Health confirmed 4 more cases bringing the total number of cases to 4,039.

On 8 June, the Ministry of Health confirmed 1 more case bringing the total number of cases to 4,040.

On 9 June, the Ministry of Health confirmed 6 more cases, bringing the total number of cases to 4,046.

On 10 June, the Ministry of Health confirmed 3 more cases, bringing the total number of cases to 4,049.

On 11 June, the Ministry of Health confirmed 3 more cases, bringing the total number of cases to 4,052.

On 12 June, the Ministry of Health confirmed 3 more cases, bringing the total number of cases to 4,055.

On 13 June, the Ministry of Health confirmed 8 more cases, bringing the total number of cases to 4,063.

On 14 June, the Ministry of Health confirmed 7 more cases, bringing the total number of cases to 4,070.

On 15 June, the Ministry of Health confirmed 2 more cases, bringing the total number of cases to 4,072.

On 16 June, the Ministry of Health confirmed 3 more cases, bringing the total number of cases to 4,075.

On 17 June, the Ministry of Health confirmed 10 more cases, bringing the total number of cases to 4,085.

On 18 June, the Ministry of Health confirmed 6 more cases, bringing the total number of cases to 4,091.

On 19 June, the Ministry of Health confirmed 8 more cases, bringing the total number of cases to 4,099.

On 20 June, the Ministry of Health confirmed 6 more cases, bringing the total number of cases to 4,105.

On 21 June, the Ministry of Health confirmed 15 more cases, bringing the total number of cases to 4,120.

On 22 June, the Ministry of Health confirmed 1 more case, bringing the total number of cases to 4,121.

On 23 June, the Ministry of Health confirmed 12 more cases, bringing the total number of cases to 4,133.

On 24 June, the Ministry of Health confirmed 7 more cases, bringing the total number of cases to 4,140.

On 25 June, the Ministry of Health confirmed 11 more cases, bringing the total number of cases to 4,151.

On 26 June, the Ministry of Health confirmed 22 more cases, bringing the total number of cases to 4,173.

On 27 June, the Ministry of Health confirmed 44 more cases, bringing the total number of cases to 4,217.

On 28 June, the Ministry of Health confirmed 25 more cases, bringing the total number of cases to 4,242.

On 29 June, the Ministry of Health confirmed 14 more cases, bringing the total number of cases to 4,256.

On 30 June, the Ministry of Health confirmed 43 more cases, bringing the total number of cases to 4,299.

=== July 2020 ===
On 1 July, the Ministry of Health confirmed 46 more cases, bringing the total number of cases to 4,345.

On 2 July, the Ministry of Health confirmed 50 more cases, bringing the total number of cases to 4,395.

On 3 July, the Ministry of Health confirmed 52 more cases, bringing the total number of cases to 4,447.

On 4 July, the Ministry of Health confirmed 29 more cases, bringing the total number of cases to 4,476.

On 5 July, the Ministry of Health confirmed 46 more cases, bringing the total number of cases to 4,522.

On 6 July, the Ministry of Health confirmed 20 more cases, bringing the total number of cases to 4,542.

On 7 July, the Ministry of Health confirmed 61 more cases, bringing the total number of cases to 4,603.

On 8 July, the Ministry of Health confirmed 47 more cases, bringing the total number of cases to 4,650.

On 9 July, the Ministry of Health confirmed 69 more cases, bringing the total number of cases to 4,719.

On 10 July, the Ministry of Health confirmed 58 more cases, bringing the total number of cases to 4,777.

On 11 July, the Ministry of Health confirmed 65 more cases, bringing the total number of cases to 4,842.

On 12 July, the Ministry of Health confirmed 83 more cases, bringing the total number of cases to 4,925, while 1 more death was confirmed.

On 13 July, the Ministry of Health confirmed 31 more cases, bringing the total number of cases to 4,956.

On 14 July, the Ministry of Health confirmed 100 more cases, bringing the total number of cases to 5,056.

On 15 July, the Ministry of Health confirmed 66 more cases, bringing the total number of cases to 5,122.

On 16 July, the Ministry of Health confirmed 163 more cases, bringing the total number of cases to 5,285.

On 17 July, the Ministry of Health confirmed 124 more cases, bringing the total number of cases to 5,409.

On 18 July, the Ministry of Health confirmed 74 more cases, bringing the total number of cases to 5,483.

On 19 July, the Ministry of Health confirmed 112 more cases, bringing the total number of cases to 5,605. Something is not correct here, as 5483+112= 5595, so 10 less than indicated, but no actual fault was to be found.

On 20 July, the Ministry of Health confirmed 35 more cases, bringing the total number of cases to 5,639. (5605+35=5640?)

On 21 July, the Ministry of Health confirmed 86 more cases, bringing the total number of cases to 5,725.

On 22 July, the Ministry of Health confirmed 129 more cases, bringing the total number of cases to 5,854.

On 23 July, the Ministry of Health confirmed 98 more cases, bringing the total number of cases to 5,952, while 1 more death was confirmed.

On 24 July, the Ministry of Health confirmed 104 more cases, bringing the total number of cases to 6,056.

On 25 July, the Ministry of Health confirmed 104 more cases, bringing the total number of cases to 6,189.

On 26 July, the Ministry of Health confirmed 83 more cases, bringing the total number of cases to 6,272.

=== November 2020 ===
Curfew introduced between 23:00 and 06:00, and maximum numbers meeting reduced to 4 with fines of up to €500 for individuals and €4,000 for businesses for breaches.

A partial lockdown was announced on 23 November affecting leisure facilities including gyms, pools and cinemas as well as restaurants and bars and home visits limited to 2 people, to run until 15 December.

=== December 2020 ===
On 26 December, additional measures were introduced and they take place until 10 January 2021. Curfew was extended and began at 21:00 instead of 23:00. Moreover, non-essential shops will be closed.

== See also ==
- COVID-19 pandemic in Europe
- COVID-19 pandemic by country and territory
- List of hospitals in Luxembourg
