= Marc Thewes =

Luxembourgish lawyer (born 1967)

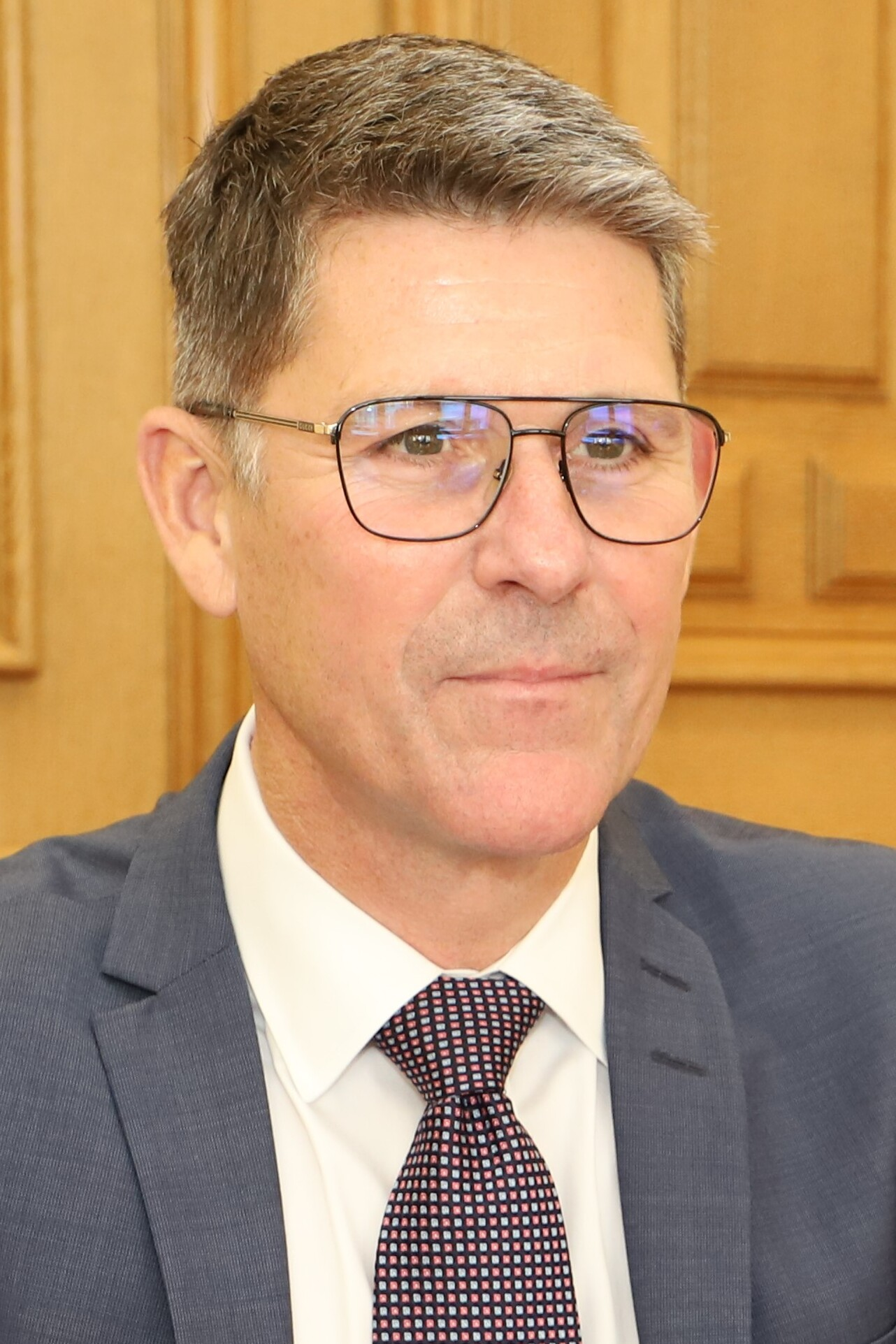

President of the Council of State of Luxembourg
- Incumbent
- Assumed office 7 April 2024
- Monarchs: Henri; Guillaume V
- Preceded by: Christophe Schiltz

Councillor of State
- Incumbent
- Assumed office 5 February 2015
- Preceded by: Roger Molitor

Personal details
- Born: 21 February 1967 (age 59) Luxembourg City, Luxembourg
- Education: UCLouvain; London School of Economics

Marc Roger Thewes (born 21 February 1967) is a Luxembourgish lawyer serving as the president of the Council of State of Luxembourg since 2024.
