= Grand Duke's Official Birthday =

Annual national holiday of Luxembourg

Luxembourgish National Day
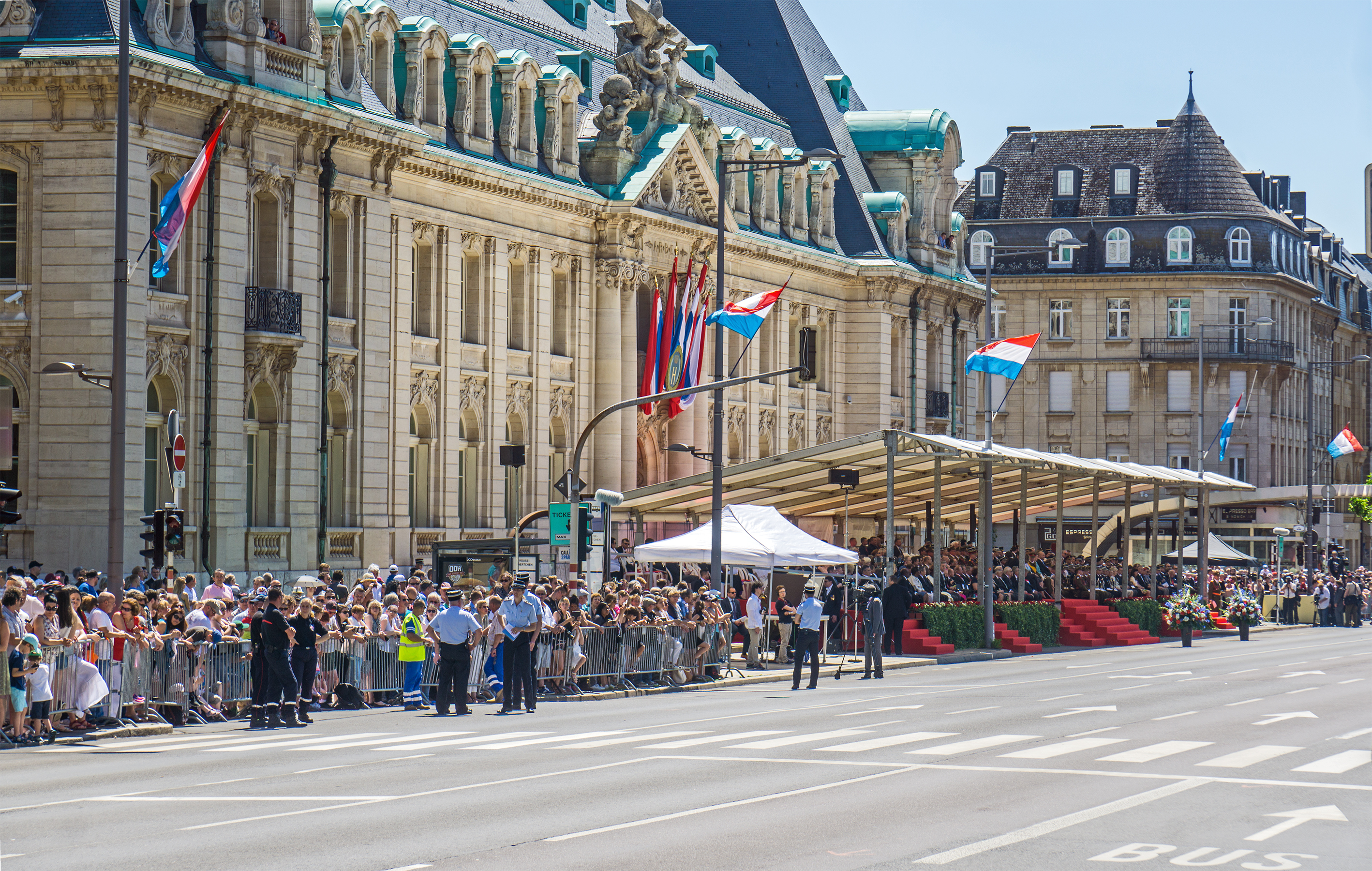
- Parade on Luxembourgish National Day in 2016
- Official name: Lëtzebuerger Nationalfeierdag
- Date: 23 June
- Next time: 23 June 2027
- Frequency: annual
- Related to: Monarchy of Luxembourg

The Grand Duke's Official Birthday (Luxembourgish: Groussherzogsgebuertsdag, French: Célébration publique de l'anniversaire du souverain), also known as Luxembourgish National Day (Luxembourgish: Lëtzebuerger Nationalfeierdag, French: Fête nationale luxembourgeoise, German: Luxemburgischer Nationalfeiertag), is celebrated as the annual national holiday of Luxembourg. It is celebrated on 23 June, although this has never been the actual birthday of any ruler of Luxembourg. When the monarch of Luxembourg is female, it is known as the Grand Duchess's Official Birthday.

== Development of the holiday ==
The monarch's birthday has not always been celebrated on 23 June. Under William I (1815–1840), the date was 24 April (although his actual birthday was 24 August), and under William II (1840–1849), it was 6 December, his actual birthday. Because William I abdicated in October, between their birthdays, the holiday was celebrated twice in 1840. Under William III (1849–1890), the date was set at 17 June until 1859, after which his birthday was celebrated on 19 February, his actual birthday.

With the separation of the orders of succession, the Dutch and Luxembourgish thrones split in 1890. The Nassau-Weilburg monarchs celebrated their official birthdays on their actual birthdays. In 1947, the day was declared the 'national holiday.' As both the then-reigning Charlotte and the heir apparent (and regent) Jean were born in January, it was feared that their actual birthdays, therefore the nation's holiday, would be marred by poor weather. Thus, on 23 December 1961, the date was fixed on 23 June by Grand Ducal decree.

== Celebration of the holiday ==
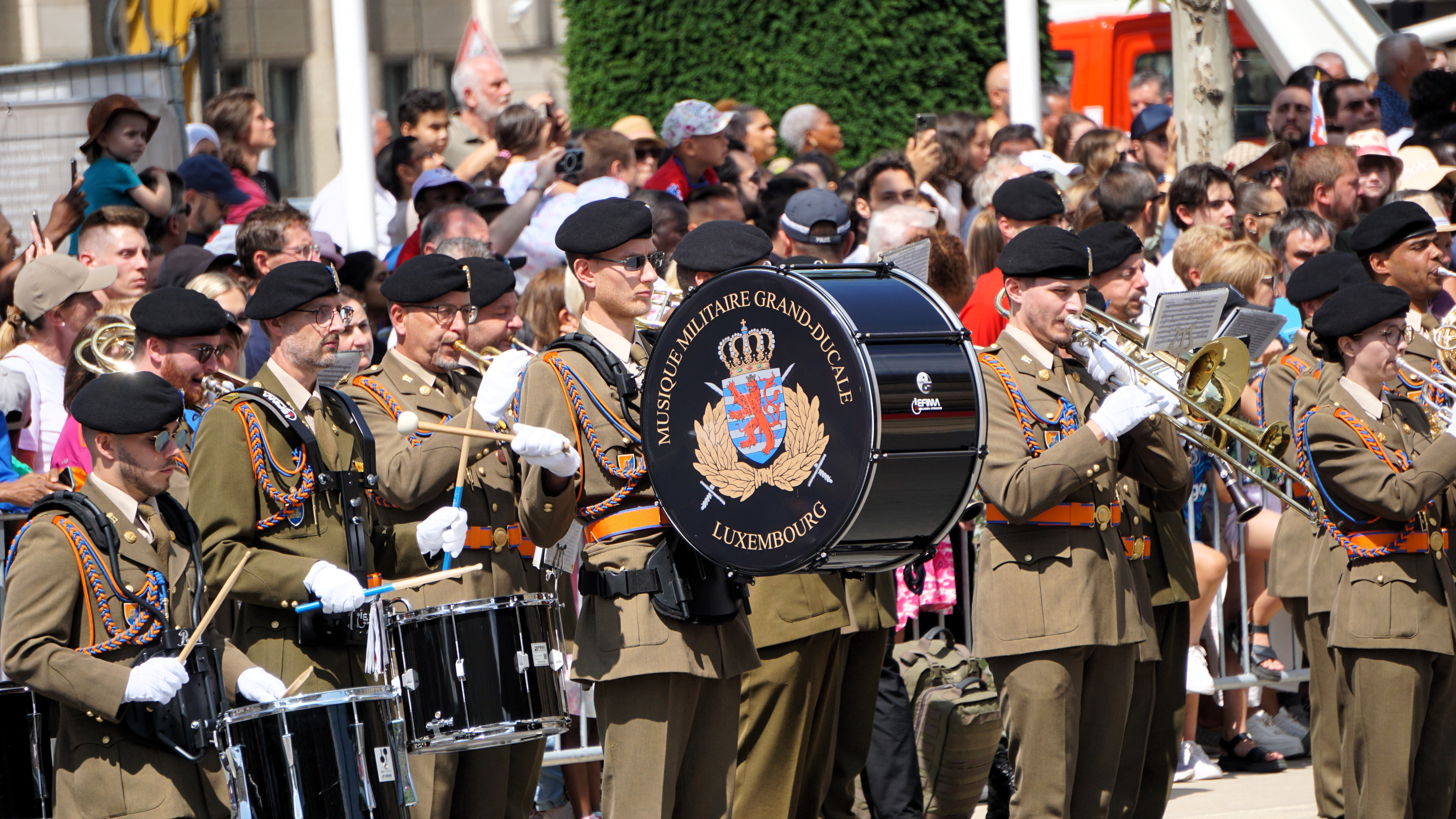
2023 Luxembourg National Day

The festivities of the Luxembourgish National Day begin on the afternoon of June 22nd. A torchlight parade takes place at dusk on the evening of June 22nd, and dancing and festivities continue late until the night. June 23rd is a public holiday and processions with the Grand Ducal Family of Luxembourg take place.

== See also ==
- King's Official Birthday, a similar celebration in the Commonwealth realms
- Koningsdag, a similar celebration in the Netherlands
