= Etienne Schneider =

Luxembourgish politician

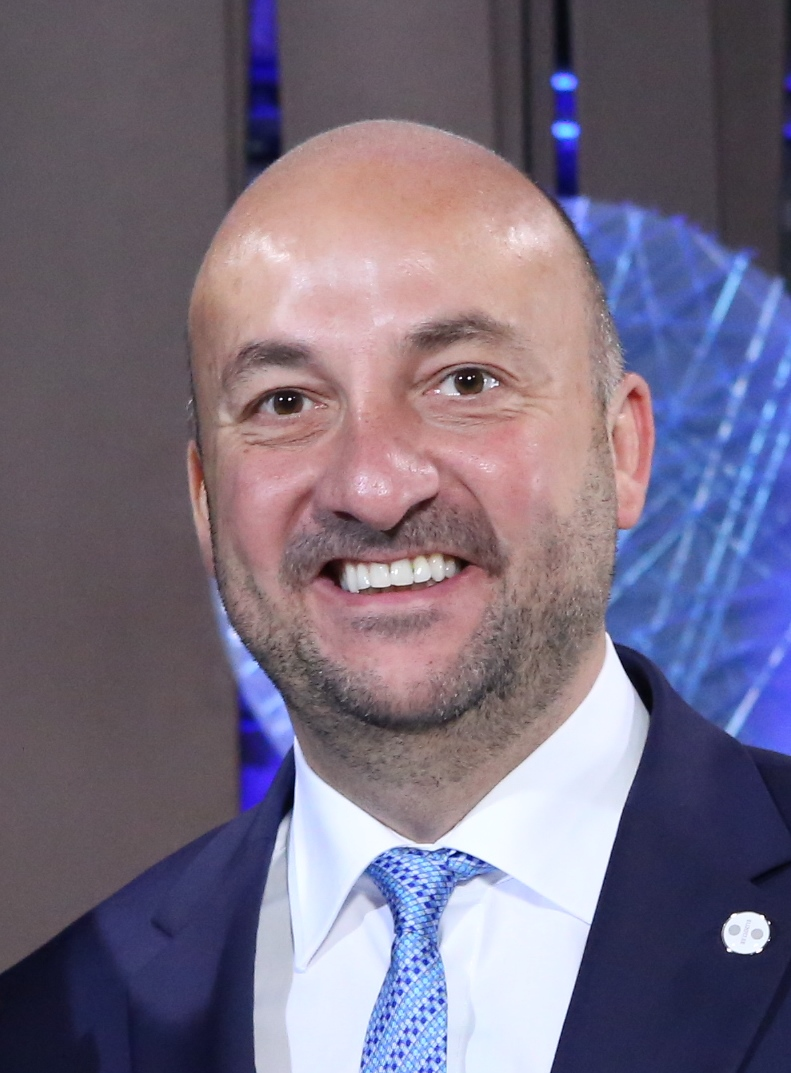
- Schneider in 2017

Deputy Prime Minister of Luxembourg
- In office 4 December 2013 – 4 February 2020 Serving with Félix Braz (2018–20)
- Prime Minister: Xavier Bettel
- Preceded by: Jean Asselborn
- Succeeded by: Dan Kersch

Minister of Health
- In office 5 December 2018 – 4 February 2020
- Prime Minister: Xavier Bettel
- Preceded by: Lydia Mutsch
- Succeeded by: Paulette Lenert

Minister for the Economy and Foreign Trade
- In office 1 February 2012 – 4 February 2020
- Prime Minister: Jean-Claude Juncker; Xavier Bettel
- Preceded by: Jeannot Krecké
- Succeeded by: Franz Fayot

Minister for Defence
- In office 4 December 2013 – 5 December 2018
- Prime Minister: Xavier Bettel
- Preceded by: Jean-Marie Halsdorf
- Succeeded by: François Bausch

Personal details
- Born: 29 January 1971 (age 55) Dudelange, Luxembourg
- Party: Luxembourg Socialist Workers' Party
- Spouse: Jérôme Domange (m. 2016)
- Education: ICHEC Brussels Management School; University of Greenwich

Etienne Schneider (Luxembourgish: [eˈtjæn ˈʃnɑɪ̯dɐ]; born 29 January 1971) is a Luxembourgish politician and economist who served as Deputy Prime Minister of Luxembourg from 2013 to 2020. He is a member of the Luxembourg Socialist Workers' Party (LSAP).

Schneider was a communal councillor in Kayl from 1995 to 2010, serving as the commune's first alderman from 2005 to 2010. From 1997 to 2004, he was secretary general of the LSAP parliamentary group.

Schneider was appointed Minister for the Economy and Foreign Trade on 1 February 2012. In the government formed following the 2013 general election, he was Deputy Prime Minister and Minister for the Economy. He continued to hold these offices following the 2018 general election, where he became the health minister as well. From 2013 to 2018, Schneider served as Minister for Defence. Following the 2018 general election, he became the first openly gay politician to be reelected for the office of deputy prime minister.

After stepping down as deputy prime minister on 4 February 2020, Schneider entered the private sector on the board of directors of both ArcelorMittal and the Vladimir Yevtushenkov and Evgeny Novitsky associated Russian firm Sistema.

== Early life ==
Born in Dudelange, Schneider completed his secondary schooling at the Lycée Technique d'Esch-sur-Alzette before studying at the ICHEC Brussels Management School and at the University of Greenwich in London where he graduated in business and finance in 1995.

== Political posts ==
In 1995, Schneider became a councilor in Kayl, a post he maintained until 2005, subsequently becoming first alderman until 2010. In 1997, he was appointed secretary general of the Luxembourg Socialist Workers' Party (LSAP) until he became chairman of the board of the electricity utility Cegedel, subsequently becoming chairman and Managing Director of the German energy company, Enovos (a grid company), the creation of which is also credited to him. Schneider was also a research assistant at the European Parliament in Brussels between 1995 and 1996. In the Kayl municipal elections in 2005 he was elected as first alderman of the municipality which post he occupied till May 2010. During 1997, he worked in Brussels as a project leader with NATO. In 2010, he also became chairman and managing director of Luxembourg's Société Nationale de Crédit et d'Investissement but resigned all his business appointments when he became Minister of the Economy and Foreign Trade in February 2012, replacing Jeannot Krecké. In this capacity he also co-chaired the Superior Committee for Research and Innovation. His tasks as minister involved private sector research and implementation of the bill of 5 June 2009 relating to assistance in the field of research.

Following the legislative elections of 20 October 2013, Étienne Schneider was appointed Deputy Prime Minister, Minister of the Economy, Minister of Internal Security and Minister of Defence on 4 December 2013 in the coalition government formed by the Democratic Party (DP), the LSAP and the Green Party (déi gréng).

After the legislative elections of 14 October 2018, Étienne Schneider was appointed Deputy Prime Minister, Minister of the Economy and Minister of Health on 5 December 2018 in the coalition government formed by the DP, the LSAP and déi gréng.

As Minister of Economy Schneider has expressed his support for the space program currently taking place to mine near-Earth asteroids in a statement, also mentioning the environmental benefits for mining off Earth.

He continued to hold these offices following the 2018 Luxembourg general election, where he became the health minister too. From 2013 to 2018, he served as Minister for Defence. Following the 2018 Luxembourg general election, he became the first openly gay politician to be reelected for the office of deputy minister.

== Business career ==
On 4 February 2020, Schneider stepped down from his post as Minister of Economy and entered the business world receiving an appointment as a director at ArcelorMittal in June 2020 after Jeannot Krecké had resigned his position which Krecke held for ten years at ArcelorMittal. On 30 April 2020 as the sole shareholder, Schneider established his first anonymous limited firm SA Beta Aquarii which is named after the brightest star in the constellation associated with Schneider's astrological sign Aquarius and is located on Boulevard de la Pétrusse in Luxembourg. On 27 June 2020 following Jeannot Krecké's appointment to Sistema in May 2012, Schneider became an independent director of Sistema which controls East-West United Bank (Luxembourg). (Note: East-West United Bank (Luxembourg) was established on 12 June 1974 as a "daughter" bank of the Soviet Union's Central Bank (Gosbank) and, since 2005, has been part of Russia's VTB banking network. Through Sistema's subsidiary Moscow Bank for Reconstruction and Development (MDRB) (Russian: Московский банк реконструкции и развития «МБРР»), which was established in 1993 with Sistema as a shareholder since 1994, Sistema controlled a 49% stake in East-West United Bank (EWUB) in February 2005 and, in 2018, Sistema became 100% owner of EWUB with Sergei Pchelintsev (Russian: Сергей Алексеевич Пчелинцев) as the CEO. Previously, from 1993–2000, Sergey Rodionov was chairman of the board of EWUB with 49% owned by Imperial bank. From 2000 to 2005, all stocks of the Russian Foreign Banks were being purchased from the Bank of Russia by VTB Bank. Andrey Kostin and Vladimir Stolyarenko were at Imperial bank from 1993 to 1998 when Stolyarenko transferred to Tokobank which held a 28% stake in East-West United Bank in 1998. Imperial focused on oil and natural gas supplies to East Germany and later to Germany including the oil-for-pipes program. EWUB is located at 10 boulevard Joseph II, Luxembourg.) Following the Russia invasion of Ukraine in February 2022, both Schneider and Krecké severed their ties to Sistema and East-West United Bank (Luxembourg).

== Personal life ==
He is openly gay, and married his husband Jérôme Domange in 2016.

== See also ==
- Bettel I Government (2013 – 2018)
- Bettel II Government (2018 – 2023)

== Notes ==
Political offices
Preceded by Jeannot Krecké	Minister for the Economy and Foreign Trade; 2012–2020	Succeeded by Franz Fayot
