= Thorn-Vouel-Berg Government =

Coalition government of Luxembourg from 1974 to 1979

- Cabinet of Luxembourg
- 1974-1979
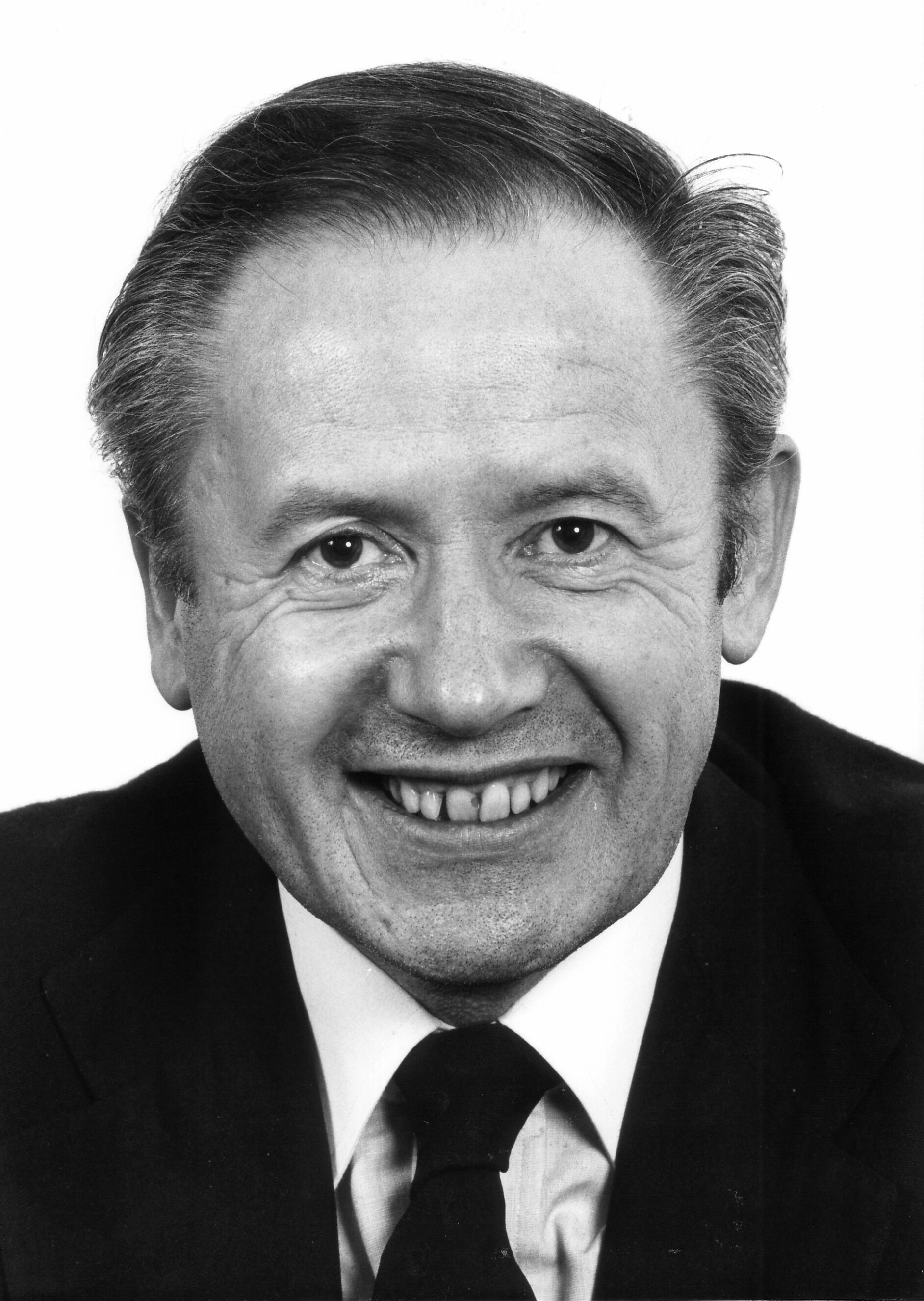
- Date formed: 15 June 1974
- Date dissolved: 16 July 1979 (5 years, 1 month and 1 day)

People and organisations
- Grand Duke: Jean
- Prime Minister: Gaston Thorn
- Deputy Prime Minister: Raymond Vouel (1974-1976); Bernard Berg (1976-1979)
- Total no. of members: 11
- Member parties: DP; LSAP
- Status in legislature: Centre-left to centre-right coalition government
- Opposition parties: CSV; PSD; KPL
- Opposition leader: Pierre Werner (Note: De facto leader of the opposition as the leader of the largest opposition group in the Chamber of Deputes.)

History
- Election: 1974 general election
- Legislature term: 25th Legislature of the Chamber of Deputies
- Predecessor: Werner-Schaus II Government
- Successor: Werner-Thorn Government

The Thorn-Vouel-Berg Government was the government of Luxembourg between 15 June 1974 and 16 July 1979.

It was led by Prime Minister Gaston Thorn, whose Democratic Party formed a coalition with the Luxembourg Socialist Workers' Party (LSAP). At first, the Deputy Prime Minister was Raymond Vouel. When he left to become European Commissioner in 1976, he was replaced by Bernard Berg.

The government was formed after the election of 1974, which saw the Christian Social People's Party (CSV) remain the largest single party, despite coming second in vote share behind the LSAP and obtaining a record low of 18 seats. This was the first time since World War II that the CSV was not in government.

== Background ==
The election of 26 May 1974 turned the Luxembourgish political landscape on its head. The CSV, which had been the senior partner in all governments since 1944, lost three deputies from the previous election, and received 29,9% of the vote, while the Democratic Party emerged as the winner of the election, gaining three seats, and receiving 23,3% of the vote. The LSAP managed to limit its losses, losing one seat, despite the splintering off of the Social Democratic Party, which fielded its own candidates and received 5 seats.

Under Gaston Thorn, who had served as foreign minister in the outgoing Werner-Schaus II Government, the DP and LSAP now formed a coalition without the CSV, for the first time since World War II.

The fact that the socialist-liberal coalition was only formed in 1974, though it had already been numerically possible in 1959 or 1968, was attributed by some to a "reformist bloc" pushing the CSV to the right, which had been in the midst of a conservative drift since 1972, when Nic Mosar replaced Jean Dupong as its chairman.

At the same time, the DP was moving to the left, away from its pro-business position. In 1971, Gaston Thorn stated: "The Right is the Establishment, the Left is the confrontation, the revolution. If this is the definition of Left and Right, then let it be stated at this Congress, that we are a Left party."

1972 was a turning point on the way to the coming centre-left coalition. The DP's parliamentary group, even while in coalition with the CSV, had swayed the opposition LSAP to its cause on several votes on issues of conscience (cremation and abortion). The CSV saw this as sufficient reason to speak of a "left bloc" and provoke a political polarisation that would soon turn against its creators. The Luxemburger Wort stated in May 1972: "In the next elections [...] it will have to be seen whether the CSV on its own is strong enough to see off the counter-coalition of the left bloc."

The DP-LSAP government might be compared to other European socialist-liberal governments of this period such as the SPD-FDP coalitions of 1969-1982 under Willy Brandt and Helmut Schmidt, and the British Lib–Lab pact of 1977-1978 under James Callaghan.

== Reshuffles ==
The Thorn cabinet was reshuffled twice during the legislature. Raymond Vouel, the Deputy Prime Minister, resigned on 21 July 1976 to become a member of the Commission of the European Communities. Jacques Poos, the former editor of the Tageblatt, took his place as Minister of Finance. On 16 September 1977, after the departure of Marcel Mart for the European Court of Auditors, former Olympian Josy Barthel joined the government.

== Domestic policy ==
=== Family and penal law ===
The liberal-socialist government enacted reforms on divorce law, abortion law and the penal code. In 1974, adultery was decriminalised. The laws of 6 February 1975 and 5 December 1978 allowed divorce by mutual consent and for a specific reason (such as the couple not having lived together for three years). The law of 15 November 1978 legalised abortion, despite vehement opposition from the CSV's deputies, who raised concerns over the life of the unborn child. In 1979, the death penalty was formally abolished.

=== Birth rate ===
In parallel with these changes in family and marriage law, the government was concerned with the demographic evolution of the country. Since the mid-1960s, fertility had continually declined. The birth rate, one of the lowest in Europe, was no longer enough to replace the generations, and pointed towards an ageing of the population. This deficit could only be remedied by an increase in immigration. To find solutions to the demographic crisis, the government asked an international expert, professor Gérard Calot, to report on the state of the Luxembourgish family and the problem of the declining birth rate. The conclusions he came to advocated for an active family policy, the costs of which would however be difficult to sustain in times of economic crisis.

=== Media ===
To preserve a level of pluralism in the press, the government introduced direct subsidies for newspapers. The formula for calculating this was advantageous to publications with a small readership, and counter-balanced to an extent the growing commercial success of the main daily newspaper, the Luxemburger Wort, close to the CSV.

=== Infrastructure ===
The government was forced to abandon two large-scale infrastructure projects in the face of popular opposition. In 1977, it cancelled plans for a nuclear power plant in Remerschen. This project had faced criticism from the anti-nuclear movement, partly due to the context of the Three Mile Island accident in the United States. Another project that caused controversy was that of the "Centre 300", a planned hemicycle-shaped home for the European Parliament, designed by the French architect Roger Taillibert. Public mockery had given this building the name Kueb ("crow"). An architecturally ambitious design, it was meant to consolidate Luxembourg City's position as a seat of the European Communities. Under the pressure of public opinion, the government greatly reduced the initial dimensions of the project.

== Economic policy ==
=== Steel crisis ===
The start of the new government coincided with the beginnings of an economic crisis. From late 1974, the prices and exports in the steel sector sank. The value of steel production sank by 33% in 1975, and GDP decreased by 6,1%. In late 1975, inflation rose above 10%. However, this time it was not merely a market readjustment, but the crisis was structural in nature. The decline in steel production turned out to be permanent, and irreversible. From 1974 to 1992, steel production decreased by more than 50%, from 6,4 to 3,07 million tonnes. Over the same period, ARBED cut back its work force by more than two-thirds, from 27,000 to 8,100. The role of the Thorn government, and subsequent governments, was to consist of managing the crisis so as to avoid mass layoffs, and to guide the transition towards a post-industrial economy.

In July 1975, the government introduced a law allowing measures to be taken to avoid layoffs and to assure full employment. This law also established an "economic committee" charged with closely monitoring the economic situation. A second law opened a budget credit of 250 million LUF to finance extraordinary works in the general interest. In 1977, faced with the worsening of the steel crisis, the government created a new body for dialogue and consultation: a Tripartite Coordination Committee, including representatives of the government, employers, and the trade unions. The tripartite conference for the steel industry came to a first agreement, concluded on 19 March 1979 and included in the law of 8 June 1979, on restructuring and modernisation of the steel industry. This institutionalised cooperation between the social partners has since been described as the "Luxembourgish model". The tripartite made it possible to use consensus to manage a structural crisis which was becoming a problem of national solidarity. Two measures in particular allowed heavy industry to reduce its headcount without massive layoffs: on the one hand, the creation of a "division anti-crise" – the DAC – employing the workers who were the victims of rationalisation efforts, on the other hand, the installation of an obligatory pre-retirement at 57 years for steel industry workers. The operation was financed by a national solidarity tax.

National solidarity also took form in the government's injection of public funds into ARBED's modernisation programme. The state became a shareholder of the company. Supported by public aid, Luxembourgish steel invested 16,2 billion francs between 1975 and 1979 in order to improve its competitiveness compared with its foreign rivals.

=== Diversification ===
From 1976, the government relaunched its efforts to attract foreign investors. From 1972 to 1974, in a context of economic overheating, the policy of industrial diversification had been paused. The crisis led the authorities to actively seek the setting up of new businesses in the South of the country. In 1977, the government presented a bill to create the National Credit and Investment Company (Société nationale de crédit et d’investissement—SNCI), a public banking institution that was empowered to provide infrastructure loans and export loans to businesses, and invest in Luxembourgish companies. A new instrument for state intervention, the SNCI served to implement the structural policy to make the domestic economy more competitive. The closing of General Motors in Bascharage in 1978, and of the Monsanto factory in Echternach represented setbacks to the government's diversification policy.

== Welfare policy ==
Despite the crisis, the Thorn government achieved part of its social programme. In 1975, it introduced a fifth week of paid holiday, and made the sliding-scale of salaries and benefits generally applicable. The other part of its social policy was the fight against unemployment. To alleviate the effects of the restructuring, the government took a number of measures: reorganising the employment administration, reforming the system of unemployment benefits, and creating an unemployment fund.

== Ministers ==
=== 15 June 1974 – 21 July 1976 ===
Name	Party	Office
Gaston Thorn	DP	Prime Minister; Minister for Foreign Affairs and Foreign Trade; Minister for Physical Education and Sport
Raymond Vouel	LSAP	Deputy Prime Minister; Minister for Finances
Marcel Mart	DP	Minister for the National Economy; Minister for the Middle Class and Tourism; Minister for Transport; Minister for Energy
Émile Krieps	DP	Minister for Public Health and the Environment; Minister for the Civil Service; Minister for the Police Force
Jos Wohlfart	LSAP	Minister for the Interior
Robert Krieps	LSAP	Minister for National Education; Minister for Justice; Minister for Cultural Affairs
Jean Hamilius	DP	Minister for Agriculture and Viticulture; Minister for Public Works
Bernard Berg	LSAP	Minister for Work and Social Security; Minister for the Family, Social Housing, and Social Solidarity
Albert Berchem	DP	Secretary of State for Agriculture and Viticulture
Guy Linster	LSAP	Secretary of State for National Education
Maurice Thoss	LSAP	Secretary of State for Work and Social Security; Secretary of State for the Family, Social Housing, and Social Solidarity
Source: Service Information et Presse

=== 21 July 1976 – 16 September 1977 ===
Name	Party	Office
Gaston Thorn	DP	Prime Minister; Minister for Foreign Affairs and Foreign Trade; Minister for Physical Education and Sport
Bernard Berg	LSAP	Deputy Prime Minister; Minister for Work and Social Security; Minister for the Family, Social Housing, and Social Solidarity
Marcel Mart	DP	Minister for the National Economy, Middle Class, and Tourism; Minister for Energy
Émile Krieps	DP	Minister for Public Health and the Environment; Minister for the Civil Service; Minister for the Police Force
Jos Wohlfart	LSAP	Minister for the Interior
Robert Krieps	LSAP	Minister for National Education; Minister for Justice; Minister for Cultural Affairs
Jean Hamilius	DP	Minister for Agriculture and Viticulture; Minister for Public Works
Jacques Poos	LSAP	Minister for Finances
Albert Berchem	DP	Secretary of State for Agriculture and Viticulture
Guy Linster	LSAP	Secretary of State for National Education
Maurice Thoss	LSAP	Secretary of State for Work and Social Security; Secretary of State for the Family, Social Housing, and Social Solidarity
Source: Service Information et Presse

=== 16 September 1977 – 16 July 1979 ===
Name	Party	Office
Gaston Thorn	DP	Prime Minister; Minister for Foreign Affairs and Foreign Trade; Minister for the National Economy and the Middle Class
Bernard Berg	LSAP	Deputy Prime Minister; Minister for Work and Social Security; Minister for the Family, Social Housing, and Social Solidarity
Émile Krieps	DP	Minister for Public Health; Minister for the Civil Service; Minister for the Police Force; Minister for Physical Education and Sport
Jos Wohlfart	LSAP	Minister for the Interior
Robert Krieps	LSAP	Minister for National Education; Minister for Justice; Minister for Cultural Affairs
Jean Hamilius	DP	Minister for Agriculture and Viticulture; Minister for Public Works
Jacques Poos	LSAP	Minister for Finances
Josy Barthel	DP	Minister for Transport; Minister for Energy; Minister for the Environment and Tourism
Albert Berchem	DP	Secretary of State for Agriculture and Viticulture
Guy Linster	LSAP	Secretary of State for National Education
Maurice Thoss	LSAP	Secretary of State for Work and Social Security; Secretary of State for the Family, Social Housing, and Social Solidarity
Source: Service Information et Presse

== Bibliography and further reading ==
- Hirsch, Mario (13 September 1974). "Jalons vers une dynamique de Gauche?". d'Letzeburger Land (in French). p. 6.
- Hirsch, Mario (18 March 1994). "De l'alternance au Luxembourg". d'Letzeburger Land (in French). Vol. 41, no. 11. p. 41.
- Schmit, Laurent (November 2013). "Yes Minister! Regierungen kommen und gehen — Beamte bleiben?". Forum (in German) (334).
- Thewes, Guy (2011). Les gouvernements du Grand-Duché de Luxembourg depuis 1848 (PDF) (in French). Luxembourg: Le Gouvernement du Grand-Duché de Luxembourg - Service information et presse. ISBN 978-2-87999-212-9.
- Trausch, Gérard (July 2020). "Pensée sociale-démocrate suédoise et société luxembourgeoise" (PDF). Forum (in French) (408): 12–16.
- Wilmes, Serge (June 2011). "Die Abtreibungsdebatte in den 1970er Jahren" (PDF). forum (in German) (308): 21–23.
