= Werner-Thorn-Flesch Government =

Government of Luxembourg from 1979 to 1984

- Cabinet of Luxembourg
- 1979-1984
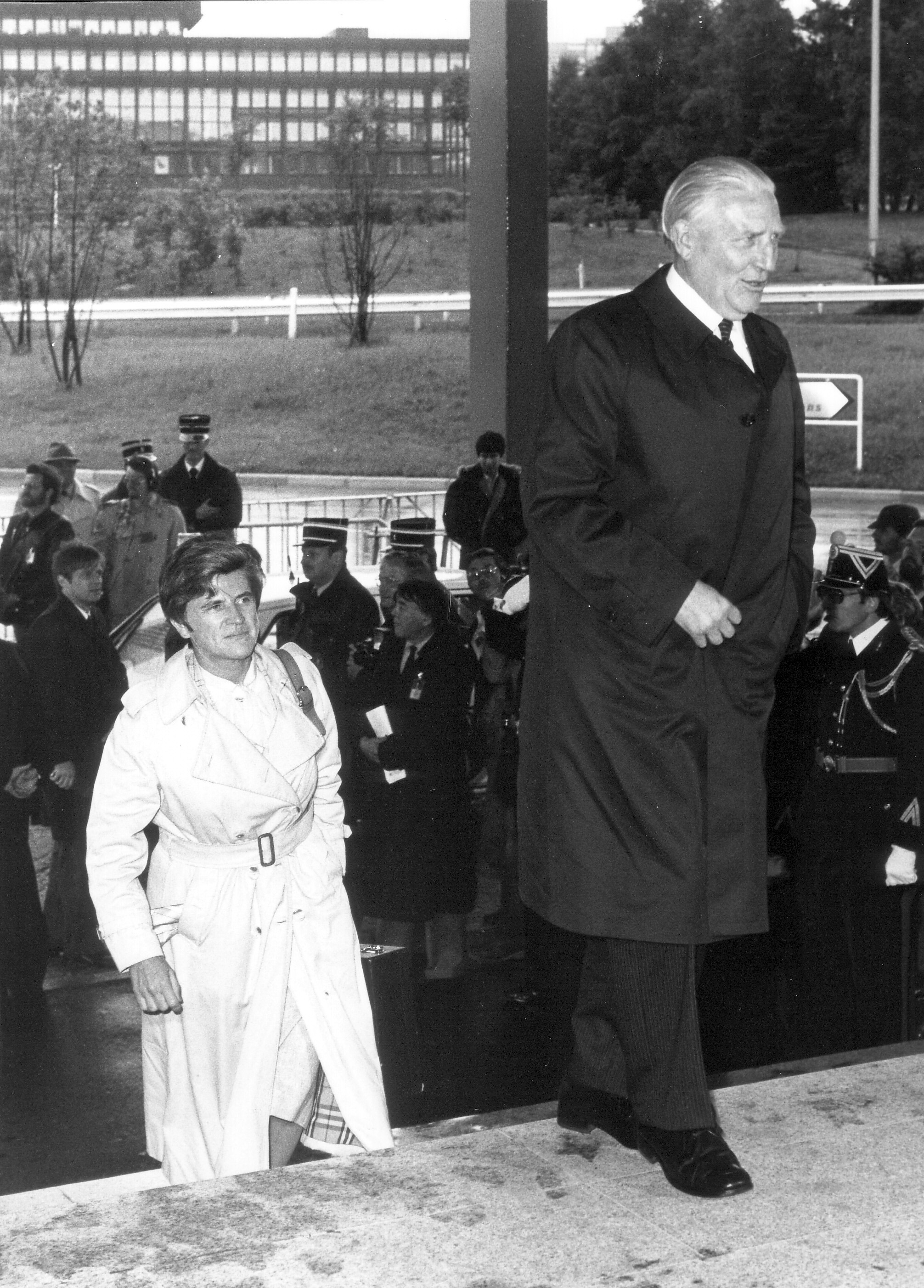
- Flesch and Werner in 1981
- Date formed: 16 July 1979
- Date dissolved: 20 July 1984 (5 years and 4 days)

People and organisations
- Grand Duke: Jean
- Prime Minister: Pierre Werner
- Deputy Prime Minister: Gaston Thorn (1979-1980); Colette Flesch (1980-1984)
- Total no. of members: 11
- Member parties: CSV; DP
- Status in legislature: Centre to centre-right coalition government
- Opposition parties: LSAP; PSD; KPL; EDF; PSI
- Opposition leader: Benny Berg (Note: De facto leader of the opposition as the leader of the largest opposition group in the Chamber of Deputes.)

History
- Election: 1979 general election
- Legislature term: 26th Legislature of the Chamber of Deputies
- Predecessor: Thorn-Berg Government
- Successor: Santer-Poos I Government

The Werner-Thorn-Flesch Government was the government of Luxembourg between 16 July 1979 and 20 July 1984.

It was a coalition between the Christian Social People's Party (CSV), and the Democratic Party.

It came about after the 1979 general election.

== Ministers ==
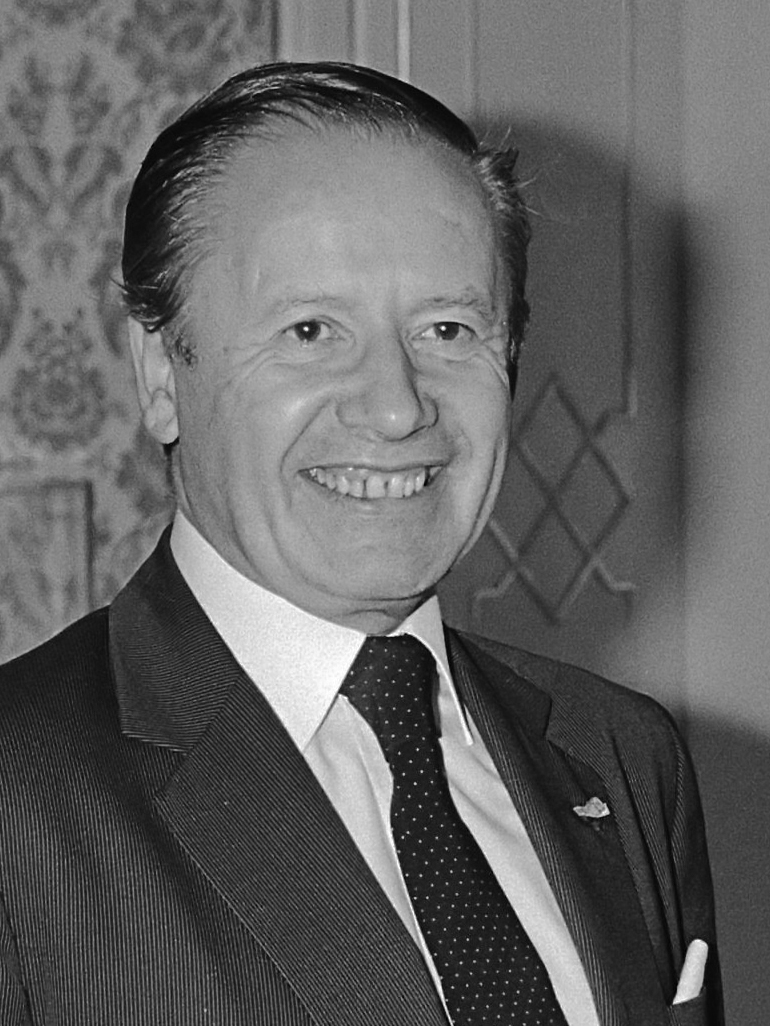
Gaston Thorn, Deputy Prime Minister 1979-1980

=== 16 July 1979 – 3 March 1980 ===
Name	Party	Office
Pierre Werner	CSV	Prime Minister; Minister for Culture
Gaston Thorn	DP	Deputy Prime Minister; Minister for Foreign Affairs, Foreign Trade, and Cooperation; Minister for the Economy and the Middle Class; Minister for Justice
Émile Krieps	DP	Minister for Health; Minister for the Police Force; Minister for Physical Education and Sport
Camille Ney	CSV	Minister for Agriculture, Viticulture, Water, and Forests
Josy Barthel	DP	Minister for the Environment; Minister for Transport, Communications, and Information; Minister for Energy
Jacques Santer	CSV	Minister for the Finances; Minister for Work and Social Security
René Konen	DP	Minister for the Civil Service; Minister for Public Works
Jean Wolter	CSV	Minister for the Interior; Minister for the Family, Social Housing, and Social Solidarity
Fernand Boden	CSV	Minister for National Education; Minister for Tourism
Ernest Mühlen	CSV	Secretary of State for Finances
Paul Helminger	CSV	Secretary of State for Foreign Affairs, Foreign Trade, and Cooperation; Secretary of State for the Economy and the Middle Class; Secretary of State for Justice
Source: Service Information et Presse

=== 3 March 1980 – 22 November 1980 ===
Name	Party	Office
Pierre Werner	CSV	Prime Minister; Minister for Culture
Gaston Thorn	DP	Deputy Prime Minister; Minister for Foreign Affairs, Foreign Trade, and Cooperation; Minister for the Economy and the Middle Class; Minister for Justice
Émile Krieps	DP	Minister for Health; Minister for the Police Force; Minister for Physical Education and Sport
Camille Ney	CSV	Minister for Agriculture, Viticulture, Water, and Forests
Josy Barthel	DP	Minister for the Environment; Minister for Transport, Communications, and Information; Minister for Energy
Jacques Santer	CSV	Minister for the Finances; Minister for Work and Social Security
René Konen	DP	Minister for the Civil Service; Minister for Public Works
Jean Spautz	CSV	Minister for the Interior; Minister for the Family, Social Housing, and Social Solidarity
Fernand Boden	CSV	Minister for National Education; Minister for Tourism
Ernest Mühlen	CSV	Secretary of State for Finances
Paul Helminger	CSV	Secretary of State for Foreign Affairs, Foreign Trade, and Cooperation; Secretary of State for the Economy and the Middle Class; Secretary of State for Justice
Source: Service Information et Presse

=== 22 November 1980 – 21 December 1982 ===
Name	Party	Office
Pierre Werner	CSV	Prime Minister; Minister for Culture
Colette Flesch	DP	Deputy Prime Minister; Minister for Foreign Affairs, Foreign Trade, and Cooperation; Minister for the Economy and the Middle Class; Minister for Justice
Émile Krieps	DP	Minister for Health; Minister for the Police Force; Minister for Physical Education and Sport
Camille Ney	CSV	Minister for Agriculture, Viticulture, Water, and Forests
Josy Barthel	DP	Minister for the Environment; Minister for Transport, Communications, and Information; Minister for Energy
Jacques Santer	CSV	Minister for the Finances; Minister for Work and Social Security
René Konen	DP	Minister for the Civil Service; Minister for Public Works
Jean Spautz	CSV	Minister for the Interior; Minister for the Family, Social Housing, and Social Solidarity
Fernand Boden	CSV	Minister for National Education; Minister for Tourism
Ernest Mühlen	CSV	Secretary of State for Finances
Paul Helminger	CSV	Secretary of State for Foreign Affairs, Foreign Trade, and Cooperation; Secretary of State for the Economy and the Middle Class; Secretary of State for Justice
Source: Service Information et Presse

=== 21 December 1982 – 20 July 1984 ===
Name	Portrait	Party	Office
Pierre Werner		CSV	Prime Minister; Minister for Culture
Colette Flesch		DP	Deputy Prime Minister; Minister for Foreign Affairs, Foreign Trade, and Cooperation; Minister for the Economy and the Middle Class; Minister for Justice
Émile Krieps		DP	Minister for Health; Minister for the Police Force; Minister for Physical Education and Sport
Josy Barthel		DP	Minister for the Environment; Minister for Transport, Communications, and Information; Minister for Energy
Jacques Santer		CSV	Minister for the Finances; Minister for Work and Social Security
René Konen		DP	Minister for the Civil Service; Minister for Public Works
Jean Spautz		CSV	Minister for the Interior; Minister for the Family, Social Housing, and Social Solidarity
Ernest Mühlen		CSV	Minister for Agriculture, Viticulture, Water, and Forests
Fernand Boden		CSV	Minister for National Education; Minister for Tourism
Paul Helminger		CSV	Secretary of State for Foreign Affairs, Foreign Trade, and Cooperation; Secretary of State for the Economy and the Middle Class; Secretary of State for Justice
Jean-Claude Juncker		CSV	Secretary of State for Work and Social Security
Source: Service Information et Presse

== Formation ==
The CSV emerged the winner of the election of 10 June 1979. It increased its number of Deputies from 18 to 24. The Democratic Party managed to resist the weakening of power, and even gained one seat, reaching a total of 15 Deputies. The parties of the left experienced a heavy defeat. The Luxembourg Socialist Workers' Party's share of the vote fell to 22,5%, its worst result since the war; it received 14 seats. The Communist Party lost half of its votes, and was left with only two Deputies. As to the Social Democratic Party, it did not manage to carve out a durable place on the political scene, and shrank to a tiny group with only two seats.

The two winners, the CSV and the DP, formed a coalition government under Pierre Werner.

Over the course of the legislative period, several ministerial reshuffles took place. Jean Wolter died on 22 February 1980, and was replaced by Jean Spautz, a former metal-worker and trade unionist. From 22 November 1980, Colette Flesch succeeded Gaston Thorn, who was appointed to head the Commission of the European Communities. On 3 December 1982, Camille Ney resigned for health reasons. Ernest Muhlen was promoted to minister, while Jean-Claude Juncker joined the government as Secretary of State for Work and Social Security.

== Foreign policy ==
In the period 1979-1984, two problems dominated the relations between Luxembourg and its neighbours. The first was that of the construction of a nuclear power plant by France in Cattenom; the other was the long-term question of the seat of the European Parliament.

=== Cattenom ===
The Luxembourgish government having decided not to build a power plant at Remerschen, France planned to install two additional units in Cattenom, bringing the plant's total capacity to 5,2 MGW. This extraordinary concentration in proximity to the border caused concern among Luxembourgish political circles, as well as the wider public. On 3 December 1979, at a Franco-Germano-Luxembourgish meeting in Bonn, the German and Luxembourgish delegations requested that France reconsider its construction plans; this, however, proved to be in vain. All the later steps taken by the government were hampered by the French authorities' refusal to reverse their decision to build Cattenom.

=== European Parliament ===
The other recurring issue was that of the seat of the European Parliament. A growing number of MEPs openly preferred Brussels over Strasbourg, and demanded a single and definitive seat for their institution. On 7 July 1981, the European Parliament adopted a resolution aimed at revising the functioning of the secretariat and technical services. This resolution seemed to point towards their eventual transfer to Brussels. However, such a decision was contrary to the treaty of the merging of the executives of 1965 which, in its appendix, stipulated that "the secretariat and its services remain installed in Luxembourg". The Luxembourgish government lodged a complaint at the European Court of Justice, where it prevailed. The government's diplomatic action was aimed at making the heads of government aware of the question of the work places of the Communities. On 23 and 24 March 1981, the European Council meeting in Maastricht decided to maintain the status quo with regards to the Communities' working locations.

=== Development aid ===
From the 1980s, development aid gradually became an important component of Luxembourg's foreign policy. The law of 13 July 1982 on overseas development aid officially inaugurated the direct public development aid of the Grand Duchy. It regulated the status of Luxembourgish citizens active in developing countries as agents of development aid. For a small state, development aid constituted an expedient means to assert itself at the international level and to give itself a positive image in the world.

== Economic policy ==
=== Steel sector ===
The early 1980s were marked by a worsening of the steel crisis. Industrial production continued to decrease, and exports diminished. Inflation reached over 8%. In October 1982, the DAC, the "Division Anti-Crise" common to the steel companies, had a record headcount of 3,850. The steel industry Tripartite was almost permanently in session.

To save the steel industry, the State had to strengthen its intervention. Through tax reductions and investment aids, it supported the restructuring and modernisation effort. However, the State's financial aid increasingly took on the characteristics of direct subsidies. This attracted the attention of the European Commission, which claimed that the state aid to the steel industry was incompatible with the competition rules of the Common Market. The Luxembourgish government defended itself by stating that the national aid was less than that in neighbouring countries. The government was also aware that in order to reduce production costs, they had to try to slow the evolution of the "sliding-scale" of salaries. However, every attempt to limit the extent of the index provoked outrage amongst the trade unions within the Tripartite. Nevertheless, the law of 8 April 1982 restricted the automatic indexation of salaries and limited the impact and frequency of index adjustments. In addition, it introduced a special levy, named the national investment contribution, of 5%.

The various government actions undertaken since 1979, or 1975, had not succeeded in stabilising the sector. As soon as the Tripartite agreements were signed, the companies were once again making demands on the government. The government also undertook an in-depth examination of the real survival chances of Luxembourgish steel production. The task was given to Jean Gandois, the former managing director of Rhône-Poulenc, who had also been consulted by the Belgian government on the restructuring of its steel industry. This double mandate opened the door to fruitful collaborations between Belgian and Luxembourgish companies. In his final report, Gandois advocated the concentration on the main sites of ARBED and the dismantling of low-performing installations. The restructuring, scheduled to last until 1990, was to reduce average annual production to 3,5 million tonnes of steel, and the workforce to 10,500 workers. On 30 June 1983, the Chamber of Deputies passed a package of laws which came into force on 1 July and enabled the government to pursue the restructuring of the steel industry, in accordance with the Gandois report's recommendations. In parallel, the Luxembourgish government sought to cooperate with its Belgian counterpart in order to bring about collaborations and production exchanges. On 9 September 1983, a meeting took place in Luxembourg between Belgian and Luxembourgish ministers with the goal of defining a common strategy and organising the abandonment of certain sites.

=== Currency ===
The monetary fluctuations of the period certainly complicated the management of the steel crisis. On 22 February 1982, the Belgian government unilaterally decided to devalue the Belgian franc, casting aside the agreement which required a joint decision with its UEBL partner. Luxembourgish authorities were faced with a fait accompli, and were only able to bring about a reduction of the percentage of the devaluation. At one point, the Luxembourgish government contemplated withdrawing from the monetary union. Pierre Werner asked Jelle Zylstra, the former governor of the Nederlandse Bank, to study the viability of a purely national monetary system. Unlike Hjalmar Schacht, who was consulted on the same question in the 1920s, Zylstra concluded that Luxembourg had the capacity to create a separate and independent Luxembourgish monetary entity. However, the currency association remained the centrepiece of the UEBL, which retained great political importance. The Luxembourgish government settled for an expansion of its right to print Luxembourgish notes, and took advantage of the circumstances to pass a law creating an Institut Monétaire Luxembourgeois (IML) in May 1983. The IML assembled in one institution various powers which had previously been dispersed, such as the printing and management of banknotes and coins, monitoring the financial and banking sector, as well as representing the Grand Duchy in international bodies. The creation of the IML responded to the Luxembourgish government's desire to enter as a full-fledged partner in the decision-making instances which were put in place in the framework of the future European monetary union.

=== Banking ===
The government's economic policy tried to make up for the loss of jobs in heavy industry through growth in other sectors, especially the services sector. Important legislative and regulatory measures supported the development and diversification of financial activities. In 1979, a government commission was set up to study the improvement of the legislative infrastructure of the financial centre. The law of 23 April 1981 enshrined banking secrecy. Bankers were now subject to the same confidentiality that applied to certain professions, such as doctors or midwives. Disclosure of confidential information was considered a crime punishable by prison or a fine. The law of 25 August 1983 on investment companies created a legal framework for investment funds and gave them a specific tax status. It created a new form of entity: the Société d’investissement à capital variable (SICAV). While the development of the Euromarket was at the basis of the boom of the financial centre in the 1970s, private banking and off-balance-sheet operations generating commissions took the lead during the 1980s. The financial sector became the engine of growth after the steel crisis. The number of banks grew relatively slowly: 143 banks in 1988, compared with 111 in 1980. But the number of investment funds exploded. In 1980, 76 investment funds represented global net assets of 118 billion francs. In 1988, 473 entities represented holdings equivalent to 1,668 billion francs. The Luxembourgish government certainly benefited from the tax obstacles – especially the withholding tax – encountered by this type of companies in their countries of origin. However, the financial centre's success was also based on a skilful niche policy which required flexibility and quick decision-making.

=== Satellite broadcasting ===
In the early 1980s, the government involved itself in an up-and-coming sector, satellite broadcasting. At a conference of the members of the International Telecommunication Union in Geneva in 1977, Luxembourg was attributed five channels for direct satellite broadcasting. The Luxembourgish State initially intended to allocate them to the Compagnie Luxembourgeoise de Télédiffusion (CLT). However, the company's shareholders feared the risks and expenses involved with a satellite. At the same time, the French government exerted strong pressure to the extent that Luxembourg abandoned its own plans, and offered CLT the possibility of being involved in the French satellite TDF-1. This led the Luxembourgish government to turn to an American expert, Clay T. Whitehead, who advocated the concept of a medium-power satellite and created a consulting group, Coronet Research. His satellite plan was finally taken up by the Santer government, and its realisation entrusted to the Société Européenne des Satellites (SES).

== Domestic policy ==
=== World War II victims ===
The Werner-Flesch government finally found a solution to a question which had troubled domestic politics for more than 30 years. The law of 12 June 1981 officially recognised as victims of Nazism those Luxembourgers who had been forcibly conscripted into the Wehrmacht during the German occupation in World War II; it therefore put an end to the moral and material discrimination between different categories of World War II victims.

=== Secondary schools ===
The government also managed to harmonise and integrate the different systems of secondary school, public and private. The law of 31 May 1982 defined the State's financial involvement in the budgets of private schools. It established a contractual system which subjected the private schools to a monitoring of their curriculum and their teachers' qualifications, in return for state subsidies.

=== Languages ===
In the cultural sphere, the law of 24 February 1984 regulated the use of languages in the Grand Duchy. It reaffirmed trilingualism as the basis of national identity: "The national language of the Luxembourgers is Luxembourgish." French was confirmed as the legislative language. French, German and Luxembourgish were the administrative and judicial languages.
