= Camille Ney =

Luxembourgish politician (1919-1984)

- Ney in 1978

Minister for Agriculture, Viticulture, Waters and Forests
- In office 16 July 1979 – 3 December 1982
- Prime Minister: Pierre Werner
- Preceded by: Jean Hamilius
- Succeeded by: Fernand Boden

Minister for Agriculture and Public Health
- In office 19 September 1972 – 15 June 1974
- Prime Minister: Pierre Werner
- Preceded by: Himself (Agriculture); Madeleine Frieden-Kinnen (Public Health)
- Succeeded by: Jean Hamilius (Agriculture); Émile Krieps (Public Health)

Secretary of State for Agriculture, Viticulture and National Education
- In office 5 July 1971 – 19 September 1972
- Prime Minister: Pierre Werner
- Preceded by: Jean-Pierre Büchler (Agriculture); Jean Dupong (National Education)
- Succeeded by: Himself (Agriculture); Jean Dupong (National Education)

Member of the Chamber of Deputies
- In office 27 June 1974 – 16 July 1979
- Constituency: North
- In office 21 July 1964 – 5 July 1971
- Succeeded by: Joseph Herr
- Constituency: North

Personal details
- Born: Camille Ney; 1 January 1919 Ell, Luxembourg
- Died: 29 August 1984 (aged 65) Luxembourg, Luxembourg
- Party: CSV

Camille Ney (1 January 1919 – 29 August 1984) was a Luxembourgish politician of the Christian Social People's Party (CSV).

A veterinarian by profession, he was elected to the Chamber of Deputies in 1964, serving until his appointment as a junior minister in 1971. He then served as Minister for Agriculture and Public Health from 1972 to 1974, returning to the Chamber as an opposition MP from 1974 to 1979. Returning to the government in 1979, he served as Minister for Agriculture, Viticulture, Waters and Forests until his resignation on health grounds in 1982. He died less than two years later.

== Biography ==
=== Early life and education ===
Ney was born on 1 January 1919 in Ell as the son of a steel worker. After his secondary education at the Lycée classique de Diekirch and the Athénée de Luxembourg, he studied veterinary medicine at the universities of Freiburg and Giessen. After graduating in 1948, he established a veterinary cabinet in Redange.

=== Political career ===
Ney first ran for the Chamber of Deputies in the 1964 election, on the CSV's list for the North constituency. He came second on the list and was directly elected.

On 5 July 1971, Ney was appointed to serve in the Werner-Schaus II Government as Secretary of State for Agriculture, Viticulture and National Education. A year later, on 19 September 1972, he was promoted to a senior minister, keeping the portfolio of Agriculture and replacing Viticulture and National Education with Public Health. He was the last member of the CSV to serve as Minister for Health until Martine Deprez in 2023. When the CSV went into opposition between 1974 and 1979, he returned to the Chamber of Deputies, also serving as a Luxembourgish delegate to the European Parliament.

After the 1979 general election, Ney entered the Werner-Thorn (Werner-Flesch after 1980) Government as Minister for Agriculture, Viticulture, Waters and Forests. He was briefly acting Minister for Internal Affairs following the death of Jean Wolter in February 1980. He submitted his resignation to Grand Duke Jean on 3 December 1982, citing health reasons. While it was speculated that Ettelbruck mayor Édouard Juncker would take his place, the Agriculture portfolio instead went to Ernest Mühlen, while Juncker's 28-year old nephew, future prime minister Jean-Claude Juncker, entered the government.
