= Werner-Schaus II Government =

Coalition government of Luxembourg from 1969 to 1974

- Cabinet of Luxembourg
- 1969-1974
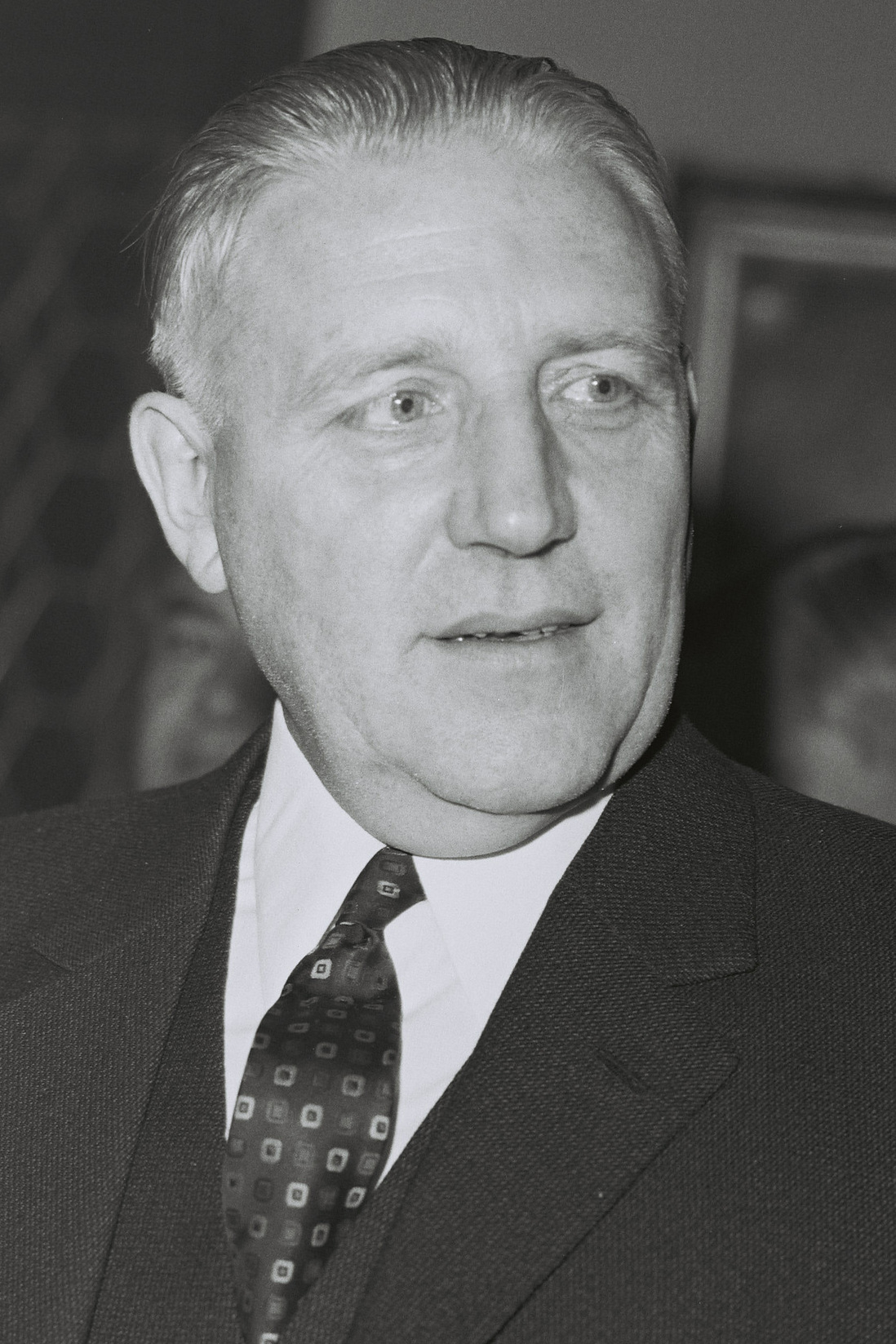
- Date formed: 1 February 1969
- Date dissolved: 15 June 1974 (5 years, 4 months and 2 weeks)

People and organisations
- Grand Duke: Jean
- Prime Minister: Pierre Werner
- Deputy Prime Minister: Eugène Schaus
- Total no. of members: 7 (1969-1971); 9 (1971-1974)
- Member parties: CSV; DP
- Status in legislature: Centre to centre-right coalition government
- Opposition parties: LSAP; KPL

History
- Election: 1968 general election
- Legislature term: 24th Legislature of the Chamber of Deputies
- Predecessor: Werner-Cravatte Government
- Successor: Thorn-Vouel Government

The second Werner-Schaus Government was the government of Luxembourg between 1 February 1969 and 15 June 1974. It was a coalition between the Christian Social People's Party (CSV), and the Democratic Party, resulting from the 1968 general election. The Prime Minister was Pierre Werner, and the Deputy Prime Minister was Eugène Schaus.

== Ministers ==
=== 1 February 1969 – 5 July 1971 ===
Name	Party	Office
Pierre Werner	CSV	Prime Minister; Minister for Finances
Eugène Schaus	DP	Deputy Prime Minister; Minister for Justice; Minister for the Interior; Minister for the Police Force
Jean-Pierre Büchler	CSV	Minister for Agriculture and Viticulture; Minister for Public Works
Jean Dupong	CSV	Minister for National Education; Minister for Work and Social Security
Madeleine Frieden-Kinnen	CSV	Minister for the Family, Young People, Social Solidarity, and Public Health; Minister for Cultural Affairs and Religion
Gaston Thorn	DP	Minister for Foreign Affairs and Foreign Trade; Minister for the Civil Service; Minister for Physical Education and Sport
Marcel Mart	DP	Minister for the National Economy, the Middle Class, and Tourism; Minister for Transport and Energy

=== 5 July 1971 – 19 September 1972 ===
Name	Party	Office
Pierre Werner	CSV	Prime Minister; Minister for Finances
Eugène Schaus	DP	Deputy Prime Minister; Minister for Justice; Minister for the Interior; Minister for the Police Force
Jean-Pierre Büchler	CSV	Minister for Agriculture and Viticulture; Minister for Public Works
Jean Dupong	CSV	Minister for National Education; Minister for Work and Social Security
Madeleine Frieden-Kinnen	CSV	Minister for the Family, Young People, Social Solidarity, and Public Health; Minister for Cultural Affairs and Religion
Gaston Thorn	DP	Minister for Foreign Affairs and Foreign Trade; Minister for the Civil Service; Minister for Physical Education and Sport
Marcel Mart	DP	Minister for the National Economy, the Middle Class, and Tourism; Minister for Transport and Energy
Camille Ney	CSV	Secretary of State for Agriculture and Viticulture; Secretary of State for National Education
Émile Krieps	DP	Security of State for the Interior

=== 19 September 1972 – 15 June 1974 ===
Name	Party	Office
Pierre Werner	CSV	Prime Minister; Minister for Finances; Minister for Cultural Affairs
Eugène Schaus	DP	Deputy Prime Minister; Minister for Justice; Minister for the Interior; Minister for the Police Force
Jean-Pierre Büchler	CSV	Minister for Public Works; Minister for the Family, Social Housing, and Social Solidarity; Minister for Viticulture
Jean Dupong	CSV	Minister for National Education; Minister for Work and Social Security
Gaston Thorn	DP	Minister for Foreign Affairs and Foreign Trade; Minister for the Civil Service; Minister for Physical Education and Sport
Marcel Mart	DP	Minister for the National Economy, the Middle Class, and Tourism; Minister for Transport and Energy
Camille Ney	CSV	Minister for Agriculture; Minister for Public Health
Émile Krieps	DP	Security of State for the Interior
Jacques Santer	CSV	Secretary of State for Cultural Affairs; Secretary of State for Work and Social Security

== Formation ==
At the discussions for the 1969 budget in the CSV-LSAP Werner-Cravatte Government, disagreements surfaced in the government coalition. While the LSAP argued for a salary increase for civil servants and a pensions increase, the CSV believed that with the economic situation marked by weak growth, it was not possible to give way to expensive pay demands. The two party heads, Pierre Werner and Henry Cravatte, decided to hold early elections, which would otherwise have been held in 1969. As a result of the elections of 15 December 1968, the CSV lost one seat and the LSAP lost three, while the Democratic Party regained its position of 1959, returning 11 Deputies. Despite their parties' losses, Werner and Cravatte would have liked to continue the cooperation between CSV and LSAP. However, the trade union wing of the LSAP opposed such a continuation. The DP thus took the LSAP's place as a junior coalition partner in the government, while the LSAP went into opposition.

=== Reshuffles ===
Two ministerial reshuffles occurred during this government, one on 5 July 1971 with the addition of two secretaries of State, the other on 19 September 1972 with the resignation of Madeleine Frieden, due to a scandal. After this second change, Camille Ney was promoted to minister and Jacques Santer joined the government as a secretary of State.

== Foreign policy ==
=== Europe ===
In the period 1969–1974, Luxembourg continued to play an important role in Europe thanks to ideas on monetary integration developed by its Prime Minister. In January 1968, invited to a congress of the CDU in Germany, Pierre Werner had presented a five-point plan for European Economic and Monetary Union. Provoking the interest of the other member states of the EEC, Werner was invited to elaborate his views before the conference of ministers of finance in Rotterdam in September 1968, then at the European summit of The Hague in December 1969. At this last meeting, the governments declared their intention to elaborate a plan for steps towards creating an economic and monetary union. Currency was going to be the motor for European construction. In March 1970, Pierre Werner was made the head of a study group that would report to the commission. In its final report, the commission of experts gave priority to:

- the coordination of economic policies
- the need for common decision-making instances
- the centralisation of monetary policy by the creation of a committee of central bank governors
- the limitation in variation of exchange rates
- the creation of a European fund to sustain exchange rates

The “Werner Plan” was well-received, but the difficulties of the United States dollar and the pound sterling, the oil crisis and stagflation put a halt on its realisation. However, the European Monetary System, which came into force in 1979, made use of several of its elements, such as the European Monetary Cooperation Fund and the snake in the tunnel.

=== Belgian partnership ===
In 1972, after 50 years of existence, the Belgium-Luxembourg Economic Union was due to expire. The two governments decided to renew it every 10 years. Every renewal was the occasion for new negotiations. At the renewal of 1972, the question of the sharing of excise rights on petrol, cigarettes and alcohol was at the centre of negotiations. While the treaty of 1921 had established population size as the criterion for dividing up income from excise, the Luxembourgish government demanded a different method of dividing it up, which took greater account of the economic realities. A protocol signed on 27 October 1971 tried to satisfy Luxembourgish demands in establishing a new distribution of excise income at regular intervals.

== Economic policy ==
=== Growth ===
During the late 1960s, the Grand Duchy's economy had been sluggish: its growth rate was less than that of its EEC partners. The weak growth was mainly due to the monolithic structure of the Luxembourgish economy. In 1968, the Economic and Social Council had warned the government that “everything leads us to believe that the times of great prosperity are over and will only return temporarily and in exceptional circumstances. Subsequently, one should not expect the steel industry to continue to be, as it has for many years, […] the essential pillar of technical, economic and social progress of the country”.

From 1969, the economic situation improved. Investments in the steel industry increased by 150% compared with 1968. Steel production increased considerably to reach the record number of 6,448,351 tonnes in 1974. Pay in the steel industry also increased by 27% from 1969 to 1973. The wave of prosperity dimmed the structural fears which had provoked the fall of the preceding government.

=== Inflation ===
However, the full use of production capacities and increased global demand created a runaway situation which risked accelerating the spiral of inflation. From then on, government action aimed to counter the effects of economic overheating by strengthening price controls, by the following actions:

- ordering credit institutions and pension funds to slow their credit policy
- temporarily authorising work on Saturdays in the construction sector, which was particularly affected by the lack of manpower
- reducing the rate of VAT on a number of widely consumed items with a strong influence on the price index

A strong increase in the budget surplus made it possible to make public savings and lead a countercyclical policy. The state's budget surplus fed into various investment funds, such as the roads fund or the crisis fund created by the law of 27 July 1938. The introduction of VAT on 1 January 1970 also sparked fears of inflation. The replacement of the old tax on revenue, which had been the principal fiscal resource in the domain of indirect taxes, with the system of value-added tax risked becoming a new cause of price rises. The government introduced a reduced rate of 4%, alongside the normal rate of 8%.

The government had great difficulties in slowing the rush in the increase in incomes, another source of inflation. It found it impossible to change the sliding-scale of pay and salaries, a veritable social taboo. However, this measure would have permitted a deceleration of the spiral of prices and salaries. Salary demands in one sector triggered demands in others. In 1969, the government had to cede to civil service demands for a “correction” of the gap that had grown between public and private sector pay. In effect, the state, competing with the banking industry which took a large part of university and secondary school graduates, was having greater and greater difficulties in recruiting qualified candidates.

=== Employment ===
The economy's growth brought about strong growth in employment. However, on the back of a declining birth rate, the national jobs market was not capable of satisfying demand. In order to remedy the lack of manpower, the government resorted to immigration. On 20 May 1970, Luxembourg and Portugal signed a treaty which regulated the recruitment of Portuguese workers. On 28 May 1970, another agreement with the Yugoslavian government was concluded. From 1969 to 1974, 24,560 Portuguese workers arrived in Luxembourg.

=== Balance ===
The growth of the Luxembourgish economy accentuated the geographic imbalance by accelerating the depopulation of the predominantly agricultural Northern regions. The law of 20 March 1974, concerning the general development of the territory, for the first time addressed the question of structural and geographic balance on a national level. Its objective was to provide political decision-makers with the means to ensure a harmonious development of the country's infrastructure. This law was also a testament to the growing interest given to the notion of quality of life and the emergence of environmental considerations.

=== Energy ===
The price increase in oil products in 1972 plunged the Western economies into runaway inflation. The government took measures to reduce consumption of petrol, for example by outlawing use of cars on Sundays. In parallel, it sought alternative energy sources. In 1972, the government started a study of the construction of a nuclear power plant on Luxembourgish territory. Negotiations took place with the company Rheinisch-Westfälische Energie AG, which was also involved with the hydro-electric plant in Vianden. The project provided for the construction of a nuclear plant of 1200 MW on the Moselle, near Remerschen. However, opposition was manifesting itself already in 1974.

=== Media ===
In the sphere of the media, the government pursued the collaboration of the State with the broadcaster Compagnie Luxembourgeoise de Télédiffusion (CLT), at the same time reinforcing the control of the public powers over the company. On 4 April 1973, Pierre Werner signed an agreement to prolong the concessions to the CLT until 31 December 1995. The Luxembourgish government obtained a veto right on sales of shares which would affect the political neutrality or Luxembourgish nature of the business. The ClT's remit also obliged it to maintain a symphonic orchestra.

== Social policy ==
In the late 1960s, Luxembourgish society achieved a high standard of living. The economic boom was accompanied by profound social changes. Almost everywhere in Europe, there were demands for education reforms, and reforms of family and criminal law. In Luxembourg also, there were demands for more participation and emancipation. The student protests of 1968 had given birth to a will to allow more youth participation in political life. Before the early elections of 15 December 1968, the Chamber had declared its intention to revise article 52 of the Constitution concerning the voting age. In 1972, the Deputies went through with the revision, lowering the voting age to 18 years, and the age at which one could stand for election to 21 years. By abolishing the collation des grades, the government fulfilled one of the central demands which had provoked in May 1968 the strike of the students of the "Cours supérieurs". The law of 18 June 1969 replaced the collation des grades with a system of approval (homologation) of foreign qualifications.

In private companies, the government put in place the idea of cogestion, that is, workers' participation in business decisions. The law of 6 May 1974 installed “mixed committees” in businesses employing over 150 workers, and organised the representation of employees in public companies.

From the early 1970s, married women gradually received more rights. The law of 12 November 1971 on the protection of youth stipulated that a wife was no longer obliged to obtain her husband's permission to start legal proceedings. The law of 4 February 1974 reformed marriage law, and the modalities of the marriage contract. From 1972, Eugène Schaus, the Minister of Justice, presented several bills in the realm of family law, especially concerning divorce law and abortion. However, these questions touched on sensitive points of the philosophy of the CSV, which feared an excessive liberalisation which would risk shaking the ethical foundations of society. The Prime Minister, anxious to avoid ideological battles, counted on a long procedure and favoured adjourning the parliamentary discussion until after the elections.

By contrast, the problem of the declining birth rate was seen as a crucial question. The government increased family benefits, especially from the third child. Similarly, birth allowances, accompanied by a pre-birth payment, were heavily increased. Nevertheless, the effect of these measures on the birth rate was not as great as hoped.
