= Madeleine Frieden-Kinnen =

Luxembourgish politician

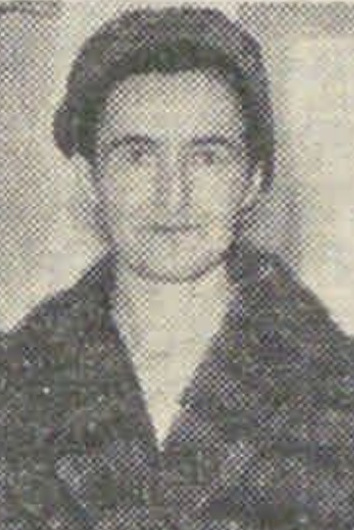
- Frieden-Kinnen in 1955

Minister for Family, Youth, Social Solidarity, and Public Health
- In office 1 February 1969 – 19 September 1972
- Prime Minister: Pierre Werner
- Preceded by: Jean Dupong (Family, Youth and Social Solidarity); Antoine Krier (Public Health)
- Succeeded by: Jean-Pierre Büchler (Family and Social Solidarity); Camille Ney (Public Health)

Minister for Cultural Affairs and Religion
- In office 1 February 1969 – 19 September 1972
- Prime Minister: Pierre Werner
- Preceded by: Pierre Grégoire
- Succeeded by: Pierre Werner (Cultural Affairs)

Secretary of State for Family, Youth, Population, Public Health, and National Education
- In office 3 January 1967 – 1 February 1969
- Prime Minister: Pierre Werner
- Preceded by: Raymond Vouel (Secretary of State for Public Health)
- Succeeded by: Herself (as minister)

Personal details
- Born: 5 October 1915 Esch-sur-Alzette, Luxembourg
- Died: 8 February 1999 (aged 83) Luxembourg City, Luxembourg
- Party: CSV
- Spouse: Pierre Frieden
- Occupation: Politician

Madeleine Antoinette Suzanne Frieden-Kinnen (née Kinnen; 5 October 1915 – 8 February 1999) was a Luxembourgish politician.

She was the first woman in Luxembourg to become a member of the government. On 3 January 1967, after a government reshuffle, she was appointed State Secretary for Families, Social Solidarity, Youth, Population, Education, and Culture in the Werner-Cravatte Government. On 2 February 1969 she became Minister for Families, Youth, Social Solidarity, Health, and Culture in the second Werner-Schaus government.

In 1972, she was forced to resign following a public scandal, and withdrew from public life.

She was married to Prime Minister Pierre Frieden.
