= Krieps =

Krieps is a surname. Notable people with the surname include:

- Alex Krieps (born 1946), Luxembourgish politician
- Émile Krieps (1920–1998), Luxembourgish resistance leader, soldier, and politician
- Robert Krieps (1922–1990), Luxembourgish politician
- Vicky Krieps (born 1983), Luxembourgish actress
