= Jos Wohlfart =

Luxembourgish politician

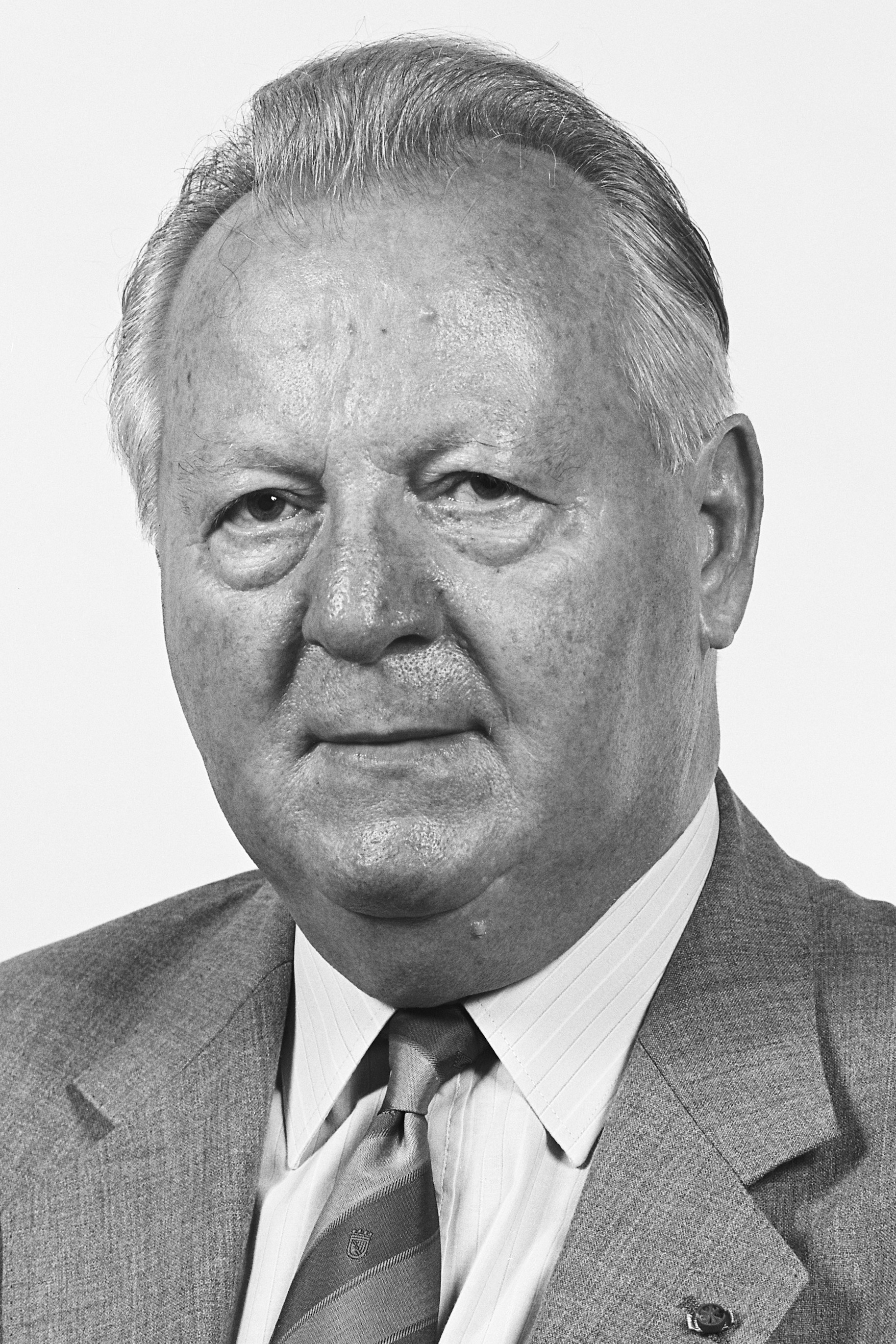
- Official portrait, 1988

Member of the European Parliament
- In office 1988–1989
- Constituency: Luxembourg
- In office 1964–1974
- Constituency: Luxembourg

Minister for the Interior
- In office 15 June 1974 – 16 July 1979
- Prime Minister: Gaston Thorn
- Government: Thorn-Vouel-Berg
- Preceded by: Eugène Schaus
- Succeeded by: Jean Wolter

Member of the Chamber of Deputies
- In office 6 July 1954 – 15 June 1974
- Constituency: Centre
- In office 24 July 1979 – 16 July 1984
- Constituency: Centre

Mayor of Lorentzweiler
- In office 8 November 1961 – 15 June 1974
- Monarchs: Charlotte; Jean
- Preceded by: Eugène Nickels
- Succeeded by: Fernand Dostert

Personal details
- Born: Joseph Wohlfart; 5 June 1920 Helmdange, Luxembourg
- Died: 5 July 2000 (aged 80)
- Party: Luxembourg Socialist Workers' Party
- Other political affiliations: Party of European Socialists

Joseph "Jos" Wohlfart (5 June 1920 – 5 July 2000) was a Luxembourgish politician. A member of the Luxembourg Socialist Workers' Party (LSAP), Wohlfart held office at local, national, and supranational level.

In 1950, Wohlfart was elected to the communal council of Lorentzweiler, on which he served for over two decades, including a period as mayor (1961 – 74). He was elected to the Chamber of Deputies in 1954. Wohlfart sat in the Thorn Ministry as the Minister for the Interior from 1974 until 1979. In 1988, on the death of Lydie Schmit, Wohlfart succeeded as one of Luxembourg's six Members of the European Parliament, in which capacity he served until the 1989 election.

He is the father of Georges Wohlfart, a fellow politician and government minister.
