= Marcel Schlechter =

Luxembourgish politician (1928–2023)

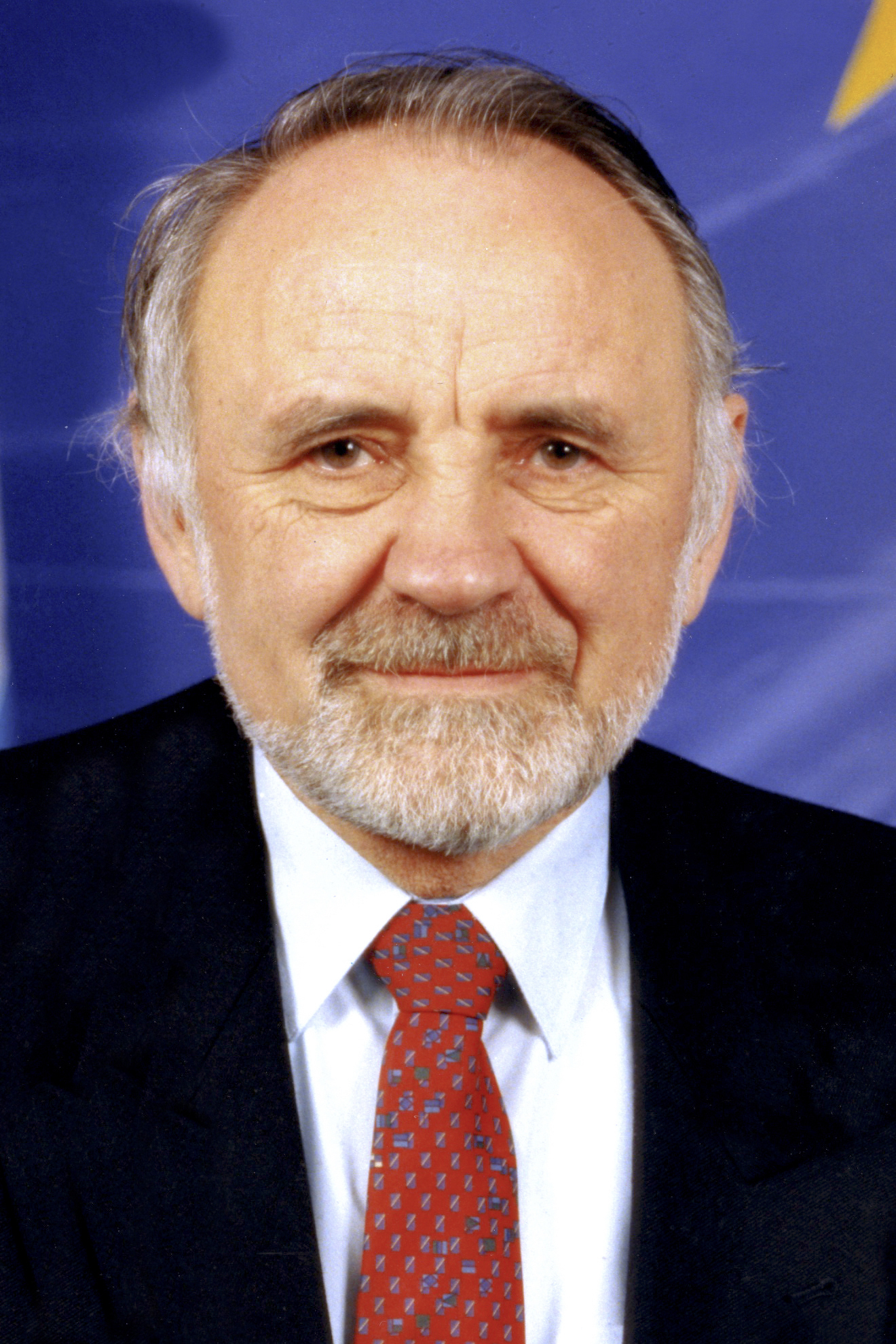
- Marcel Schlechter in 1994

MEP for Luxembourg
- In office 9 October 1990 – 19 July 1999
- Preceded by: Lydie Schmit
- Succeeded by: None (constituency abolished/reallocated)

Minister for Transport, Public Works and Energy
- In office 1984–1989
- Prime Minister: Jacques Santer
- Preceded by: Josy Barthel (Transport & Energy); Camille Ney (Public Works)
- Succeeded by: Robert Krieps (Public Works); Mathias Schaffner (Transport & Energy)

Personal details
- Born: July 9, 1928 Luxembourg City, Luxembourg
- Died: November 10, 2023 (aged 95) Echternach, Luxembourg
- Party: Luxembourg Socialist Workers' Party
- Occupation: Bus driver, trade unionist, politician

Marcel Schlechter (9 July 1928 – 10 November 2023) was a Luxembourgish politician and government minister.

== Life and career ==
Marcel Schlechter was born in Luxembourg City on 9 July 1928. He started his career as a bus driver. A member of the Luxembourg Socialist Workers' Party, Schlechter served in the Santer-Poos Ministry I as Minister for Transport, Minister for Public Works, and Minister for Energy. He was a Member of the European Parliament from 1989 until 1999. Schlechter died on 10 November 2023, at the age of 95.

Political offices
Preceded by Josy Barthel	Minister for Energy; 1984–1989	Succeeded by Alex Bodry
Preceded by Josy Barthel	Minister for Transport; 1984–1989	Succeeded by Robert Goebbels
Preceded by René Konen	Minister for Public Works; 1984–1989	Succeeded by Robert Goebbels
