= René Konen Tunnel =

Road tunnel in Luxembourg City, Luxembourg

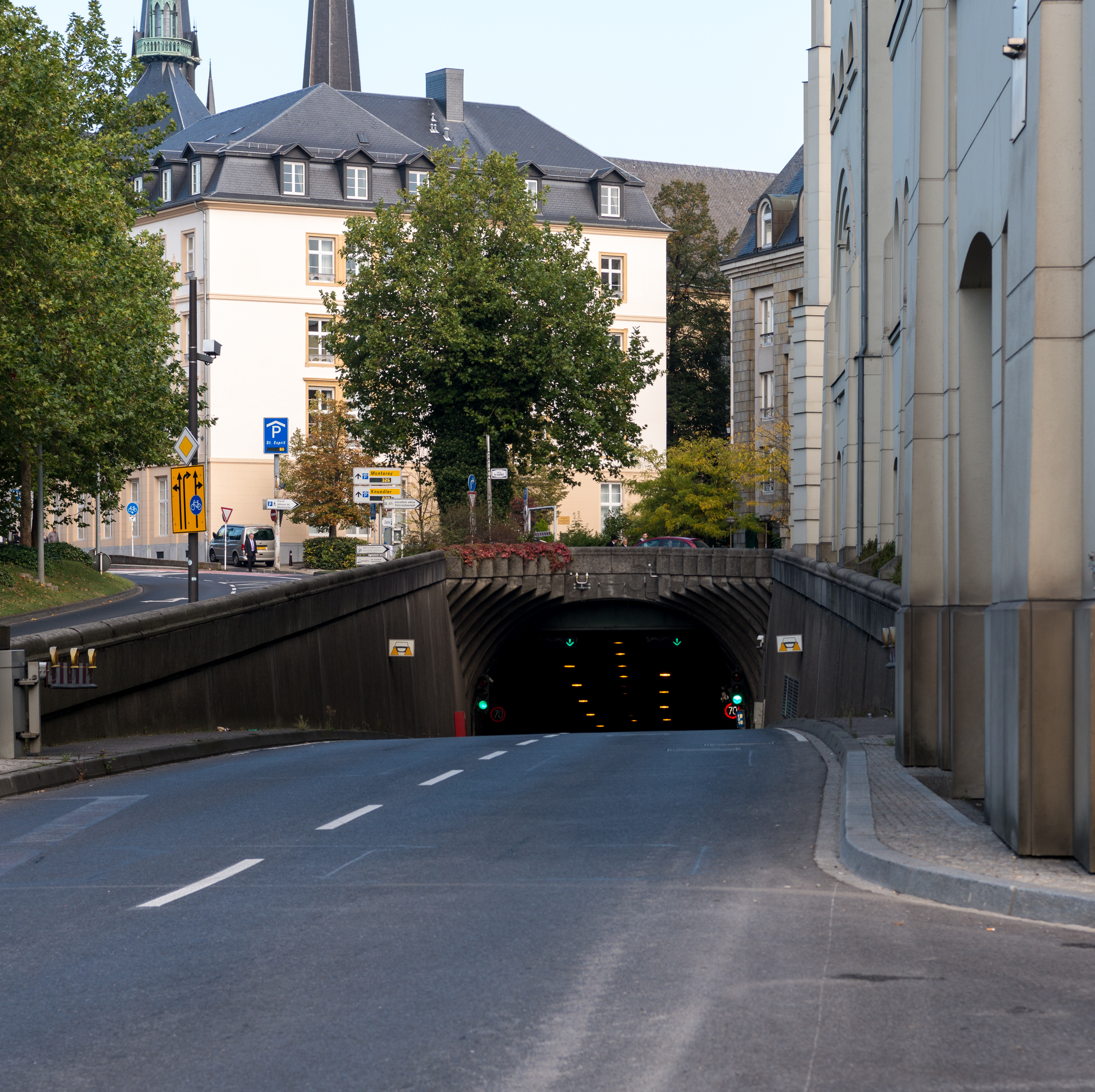
The entry of the tunnel.

The René Konen Tunnel (French: Tunnel René Konen), colloquially known as the Saint Esprit Tunnel (French: Tunnel du St-Esprit, Luxembourgish: Helleg-Geescht-Tunnel), is a 638.5 m (2,095 ft) road tunnel in Luxembourg City, in southern Luxembourg. It carries around 25,000 vehicles daily two lanes of one-way traffic northwards, under the Ville Haute district, bypassing the narrow streets and pedestrian zone in the heart of the city.

At the southern end (49°36′29″N 6°07′59″E), the tunnel is fed by the Passerelle, which carries traffic from the Gare district, on the southern side of the Pétrusse valley. The tunnel's entrance is under the Judiciary City. At 100 metres (330 ft), the tunnel bears to its right, passes under the Chambre des Députés (49°36′38″N 6°07′59″E) and heads back to the left in a long, sweeping bend. At its northern end (49°36′49″N 6°07′55″E), the tunnel emerges just to the west of the Alzette valley. The road onto which it leads then divides into two, feeding the Boulevard Royal to the west and the Côte d'Eich to the north.

After being planned from the early 1970s onwards, the tunnel was inaugurated by Grand Duke Jean on 18 June 1988. On 5 November 1998, it was officially named after Democratic Party politician René Konen, who served from 1979 until 1984 as Minister for Public Works in the Werner-Thorn-Flesch Government, and who initiated the tunnel's construction.
