= Jean Hamilius =

Luxembourgish athlete and politician (born 1927)

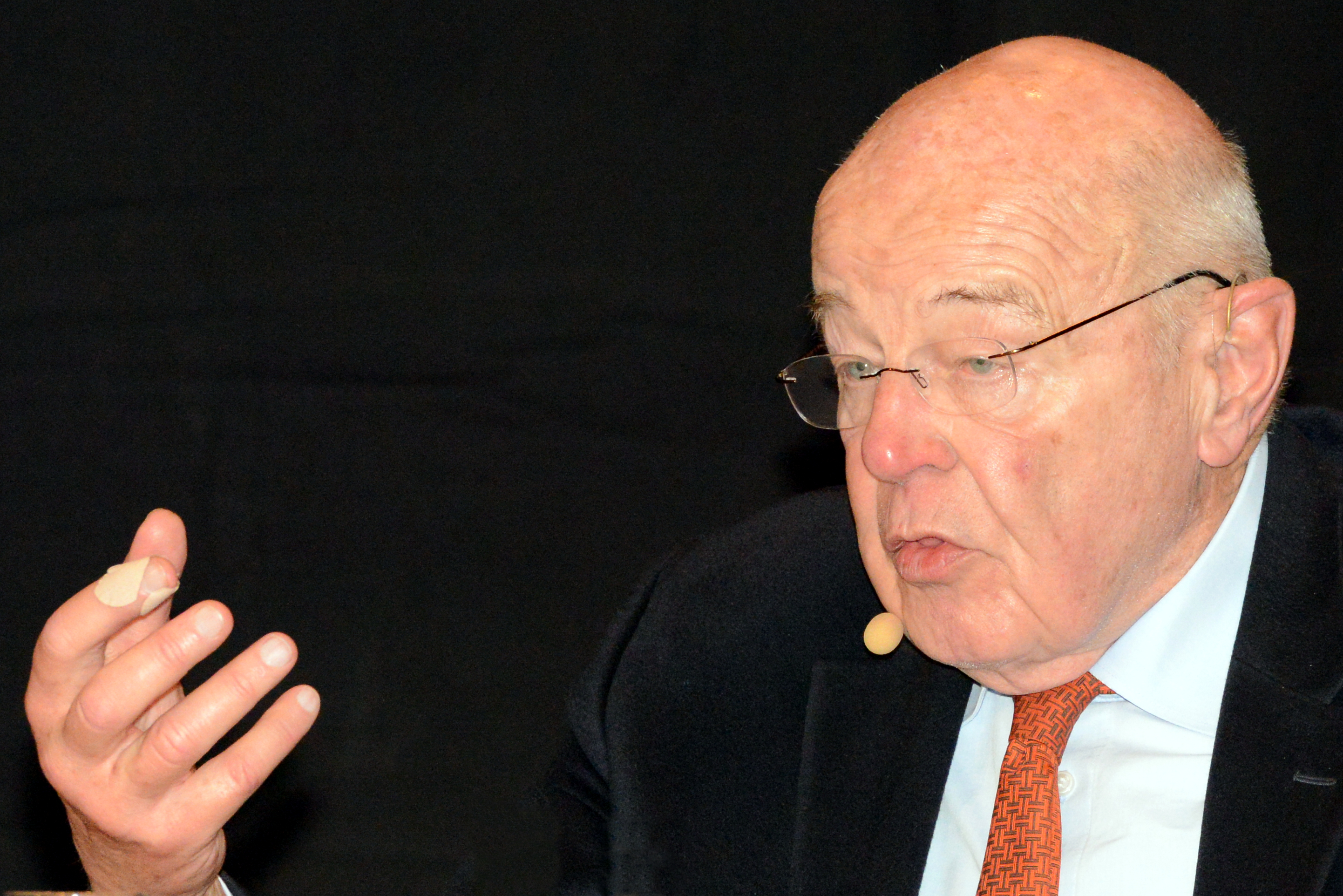
Hamilius in 2015

Émile Joseph Jean Hamilius (born 5 February 1927) is a former Luxembourgish politician and government minister from the Democratic Party. He was born in Luxembourg City. He served as Minister for Agriculture and Minister for Public Works (1974–79) as well as Associate Minister for Foreign Affairs (1976–1979) in Gaston Thorn's government (1974–79). He sat in the Chamber of Deputies between 1969 and 1984 (excepting the five years he spent as a minister), and in the communal council of Luxembourg City (1969–74). He was one of Luxembourg's six Members of the European Parliament from 1979 until 1981. Hamilius ran at the 1952 Summer Olympics, in Helsinki, in the 400 metres and 4 × 400 metres relay, in an athletics deputation best known for the inclusion of Luxembourg's only gold medalist, Josy Barthel. He is the son of Émile Hamilius (1897–1971), himself a former DP politician and Mayor of Luxembourg City (1946–1963), as well as having competed at the Summer Olympics (in 1920), like his son.

== Footnotes ==
Political offices
Preceded by Jean-Pierre Büchler	Minister for Public Works; 1974 – 1979	Succeeded by René Konen
