= Marcel Mart =

Luxembourgish politician (1927–2019)

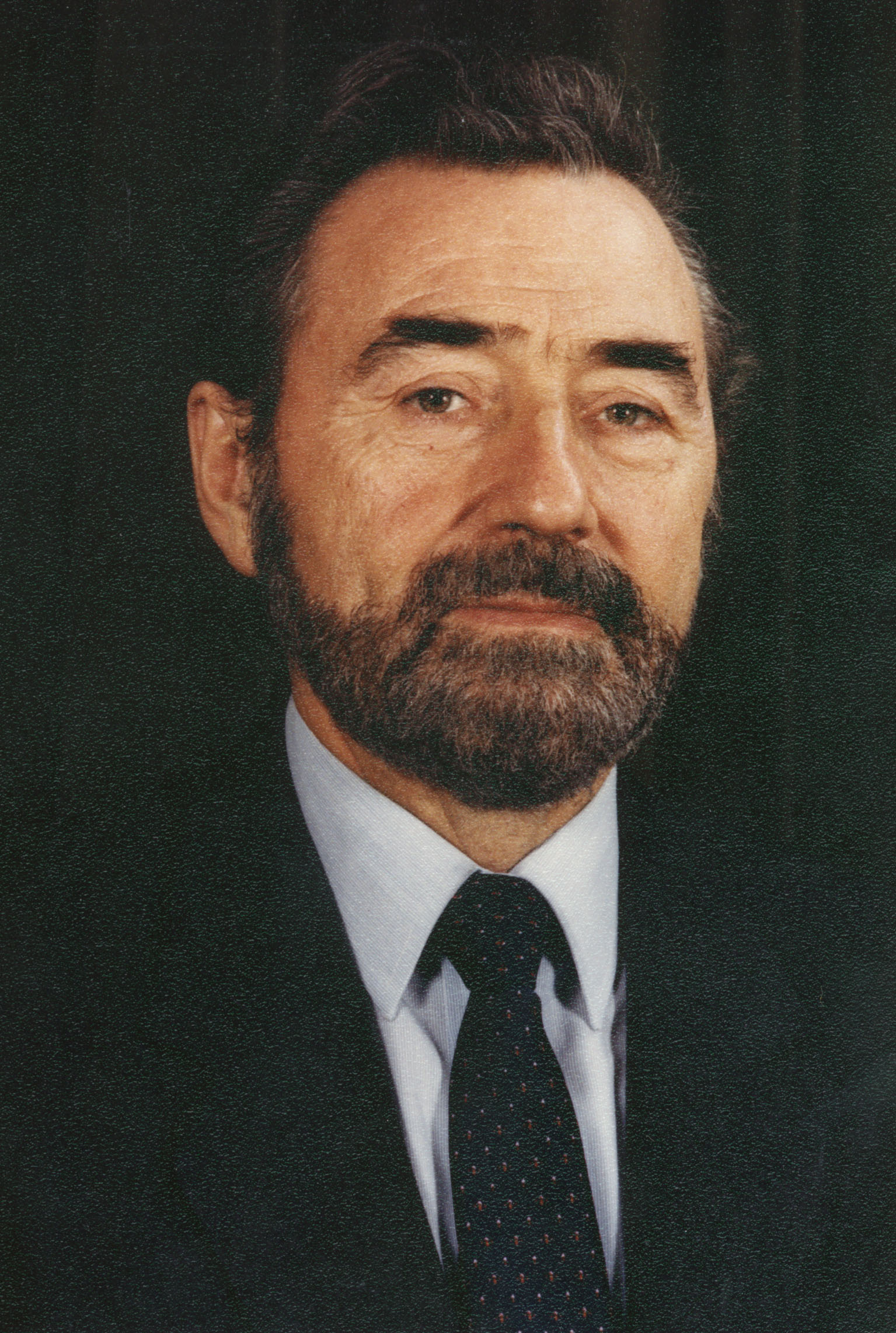
- Mart in 1984

President of the European Court of Auditors
- In office 18 October 1984 – 20 December 1989
- Preceded by: Pierre Lelong
- Succeeded by: Aldo Angioi

Minister of National Economy, Middle Classes and Tourism
- In office 1 February 1969 – 16 September 1977
- Prime Minister: Pierre Werner, Gaston Thorn

Minister of Transport and Energy
- In office 1 February 1969 – 16 September 1977
- Prime Minister: Pierre Werner, Gaston Thorn

Personal details
- Born: 11 May 1927 Esch-sur-Alzette, Luxembourg
- Died: 15 November 2019 (aged 92)
- Party: Democratic Party

Marcel Emil Mart (11 May 1927 – 15 November 2019) was a Luxembourgish politician, jurist, and businessman.

== Biography ==
Mart was born in Esch-sur-Alzette. He studied law in Paris and at the University of Montpellier graduating in 1953. After university, he practiced law in Luxembourg for a short time. In 1955, he moved out of legal work to become the business editor for Agence Europe. After five years in that role, he entered public service as an associate spokesman for the European Coal and Steel Community. He continued working with the European Community in New York and Brussels for the next several years. He also contributed to the D'Lëtzebuerger Land for 12 years.

In 1969, he joined the second Werner–Schaus cabinet as the Minister of National Economy, Middle Classes and Tourism and the Minister of Transport and Energy. He continued in his post in the Thorn Ministry after the 1974 elections. as the Minister of Transport, he introduced speed limits, mandatory seat belt laws and alcohol checks for drunk driving. During the 1973 oil crisis, he introduced car-free Sundays. He also advocated for the construction of a nuclear power plant near Remerschen.

In 1977, the European Economic Community formed the European Court of Auditors by combining audit functions for both the EEC and the European Coal and Steel Community. Mart resigned from the cabinet to become Luxembourg's representative on the Court. In 1984, he was elected the president of the court and served in that role until 1989.

After stepping down from the Court of Auditors, Mart entered into service of the Luxembourg royal court as the Hofmarschall for Grand Duke Jean in 1990. He stepped down in 1993, but served the Grand Duke's court until 1996. In 1994, he was the president of the board of directors for Luxembourg's international exposition agency, Foire, now known as Luxexpo.

He had stints in the banking field in his career including as a board member of the Luxembourg branch of Dresdner Bank and Banque Générale du Luxembourg.

== Personal life ==
He had two children with his first wife, Daniel and Caroline. Caroline Mart is a journalist with RTL Télé Lëtzebuerg. He remarried to Liette Weber after the death of this first wife.

Mart died on November 15, 2019, at the age of 92.

Political offices
Preceded by Antoine Wehenkel	Minister for the Economy; 1969–1977	Succeeded by Gaston Thorn
Preceded by Antoine Wehenkel	Minister for Energy; 1969–1977	Succeeded by Josy Barthel
Preceded by Albert Bousser	Minister for Transport; 1969–1977	Succeeded by Josy Barthel
