= Marc Fischbach =

Luxembourgish politician (born 1946)

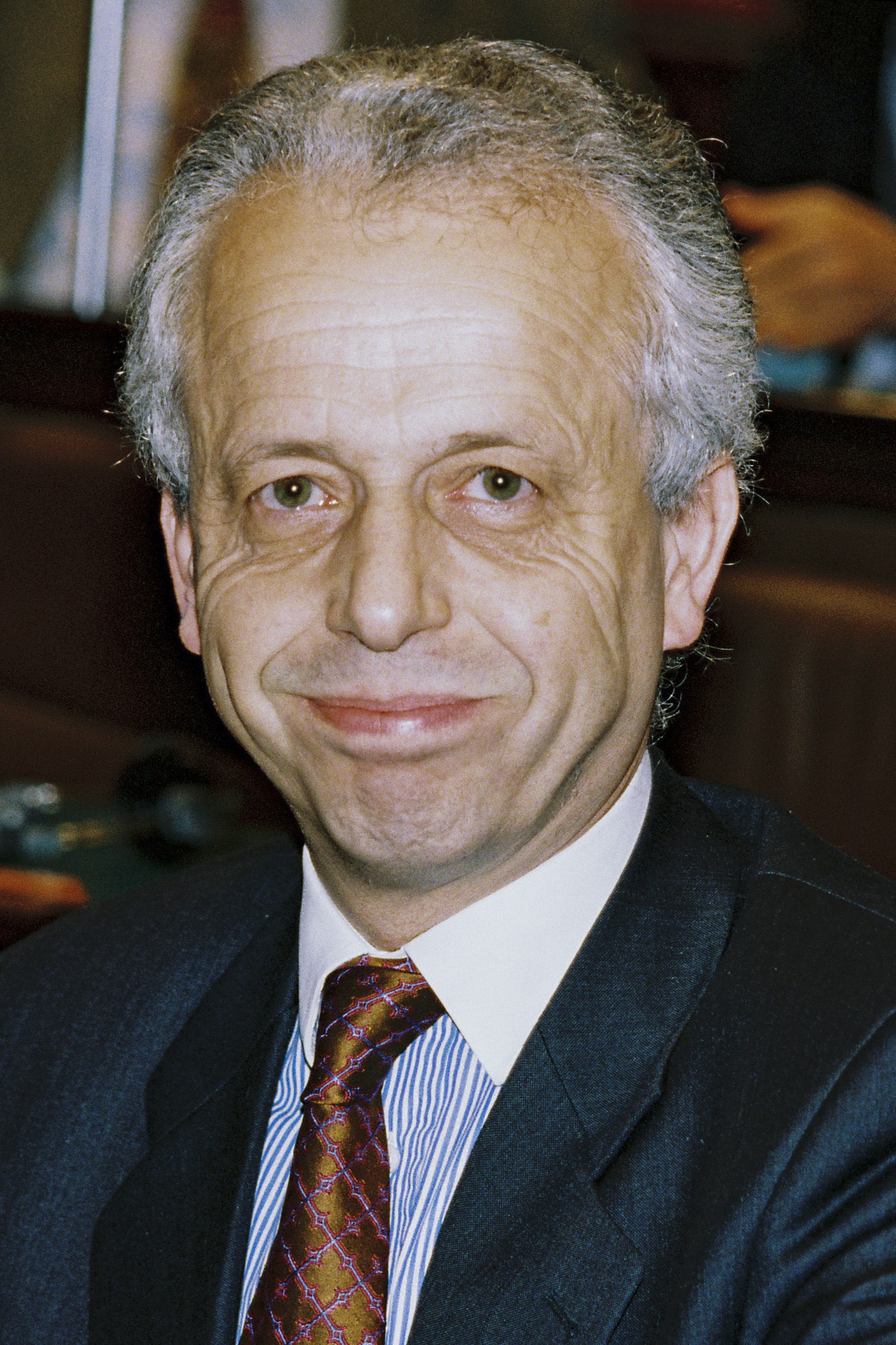
Fischbach in 1997

Marc Fischbach (born 22 February 1946) is a Luxembourgish former politician belonging to the Christian Social People's Party. From 1979 until 1984, Fischbach was a Member of the European Parliament. He served as Minister for Defence and Minister for the Police Force between 20 July 1984 and 14 July 1989, before transferring to become Minister for Justice until 30 January 1998, when he resigned from the government. He served as a judge for the European Court of Human Rights at some point between 1998 and 2003, and worked as an ombudsman between 2003 and 2012. In 2012, he was appointed as president of the Confédération des organismes prestataires d'aides et de soins (COPAS).

He is the son of fellow CSV politician Marcel Fischbach, who had also served as Minister for Defence (1964–1967).

Political offices
Preceded by Émile Krieps	Minister for Defence; 1984–1989	Succeeded by Jacques Poos
Preceded by Émile Krieps	Minister for the Police Force; 1984–1989	Succeeded by Jacques Poos
Preceded by Robert Krieps	Minister for Justice; 1989–1998	Succeeded by Luc Frieden
