= René Konen =

Luxembourgish politician

René 'Boy' Konen (23 April 1921 – 14 November 1994) was a Luxembourgish politician and government minister. He served as Minister for Public Works under Pierre Werner, between 1979 and 1984. Before this, he had been President of the Democratic Party, to which he belonged, and a member of the communal council of Luxembourg City. He was also a substitute member in the European Parliament for Luxembourg from 1974-1979, 1984-1989, and 1990-1993. He sat in the Chamber of Deputies between 1974 and 1979 and again, after his ministerial stint, from 1984 until 1993. He was awarded the Order of Merit of the Grand Duchy of Luxembourg, Grand Officer class, in 1980.

He gave his name to the René Konen Tunnel in Luxembourg City, construction of which began when Konen was Minister for Public Works. His nickname is also borne by Stade Boy Konen, a sports facility in Luxembourg City used as the national rugby union team's home ground.

Political offices
Preceded by Jean Hamilius	Minister for Public Works; 1979 – 1984	Succeeded by Marcel Schlechter
Party political offices
Preceded by Gaston Thorn	President of the DP; 1969 – 1971	Succeeded by Gaston Thorn
