= Josy Barthel =

Luxembourgish athlete (1927–1992)

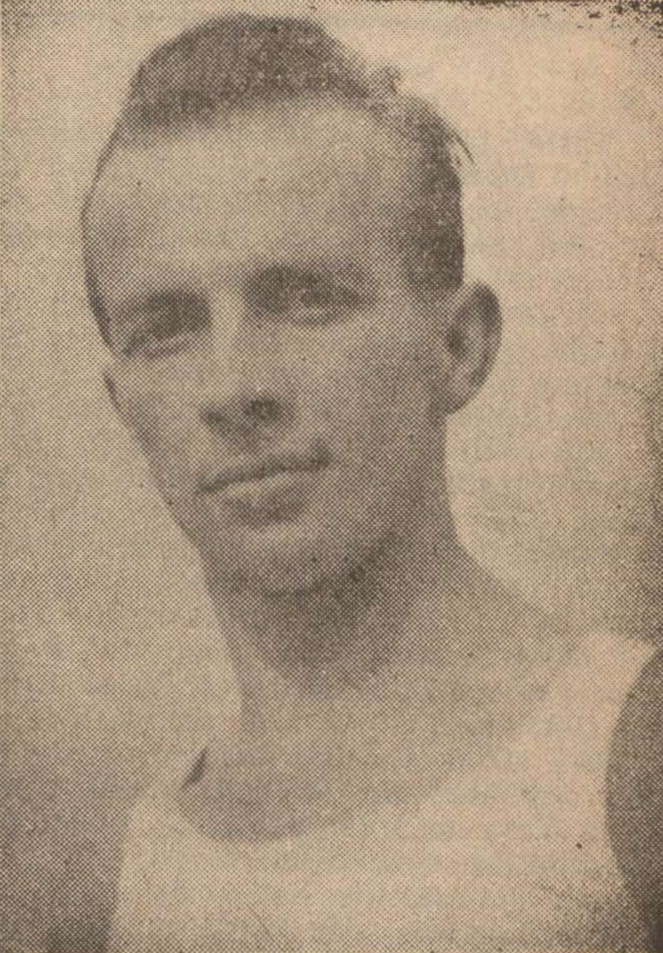
- Barthel c. 1951

Personal information
- Full name: Josef Henri Barthel
- Born: 24 April 1927 Mamer, Luxembourg
- Died: 7 July 1992 (aged 65) Luxembourg City, Luxembourg
- Height: 173 cm (5 ft 8 in)
- Weight: 68 kg (150 lb)
Medal record
Men's Athletics
Representing Luxembourg
Olympic Games
Gold medal – first place	1952 Helsinki	1500 metres

Joseph Henri "Josy" Barthel (24 April 1927 – 7 July 1992) was a Luxembourgish athlete and politician. He was the surprise winner of the Men's 1500 metres at the 1952 Summer Olympics, and the only athlete representing Luxembourg to have won a gold medal at the Olympics. Besides athletics, Barthel also led successful careers in both chemistry and politics.

== Biography ==
Born in Mamer, Josy Barthel's abilities as a middle-distance runner were discovered during World War II. His first fame came by winning the 800 m at the Military World Championships in Berlin in 1947. The next year at Military World Championships in Brussels he won both 800 m and 1500 m.

At the 1948 Summer Olympics in London, Barthel finished ninth at the 1500 m final. Then he won Student World Championships in 1949 (1500 m) and 1951 (800 m and 1500 m). The absolute high point of Barthel's career was the 1952 Summer Olympics, where he surprised the crowd and himself by winning the 1500 m with a very strong finish. He also participated at the 1956 Summer Olympics, after which he retired from running. He was also Luxembourg champion in 800 m and 1500 m from 1946 to 1956.

In 1962 Barthel became the president of the Luxembourg Athletics Federation, then from 1973 to 1977 he was the president of the Luxembourgish Olympic and Sporting Committee. A member of the Democratic Party, he later entered politics, serving as a minister from 1977 to 1984 in the Thorn-Vouel-Berg and Werner-Thorn-Flesch governments.

Josy Barthel died in Luxembourg City after a severe illness.

The former national stadium of Luxembourg, home until September 2021 to the national football team, was named Stade Josy Barthel in his honor. The Lycée Technique Josy Barthel in Mamer also bears his name.

In 2006, Barthel was accused of doping by sports journalist Erik Eggers in the German newspaper Der Tagesspiegel. Eggers cited German physician Oskar Wegener who did research on methamphetamine and other doping substances in the 1950s. Wegener strongly denied saying Barthel had any connection with doping. The use of such substances was neither prohibited nor controlled until the 1960s.

== Footnotes ==
Political offices
Preceded by Marcel Mart	Minister for Energy; 1977 – 1984	Succeeded by Marcel Schlechter
Preceded by Marcel Mart	Minister for Transport; 1977 – 1984	Succeeded by Marcel Schlechter
Preceded by Émile Krieps	Minister for the Environment; 1977 – 1984	Succeeded by Robert Krieps
Sporting positions
Preceded by François Mersch	President of the FLA; 1962 – 1972	Succeeded by Norbert Haupert
Preceded by Prosper Link	President of the COSL; 1973 – 1977	Succeeded by Gérard Rasquin
