= List of ministers for energy of Luxembourg =

The minister for energy (French: ministre de l'énergie) was a position in the cabinet of Luxembourg from 15 July 1964 until 7 August 1999. After the 1999 general election, the office was folded into the portfolio held by the minister for the economy.

== List of ministers for energy ==
Minister	Party	Start date	End date	Prime Minister
Antoine Wehenkel	LSAP	15 July 1964	6 February 1969	Pierre Werner
Marcel Mart	DP	6 February 1969	15 June 1974	Pierre Werner
Marcel Mart	DP	15 June 1974	16 September 1977	Gaston Thorn
Josy Barthel	DP	16 September 1977	16 July 1979	Gaston Thorn
Josy Barthel	DP	16 July 1979	20 July 1984	Pierre Werner
Marcel Schlechter	LSAP	20 July 1984	14 July 1989	Jacques Santer
Alex Bodry	LSAP	14 July 1989	13 July 1994	Jacques Santer
Robert Goebbels	LSAP	13 July 1994	26 January 1995	Jacques Santer
Robert Goebbels	LSAP	26 January 1995	7 August 1999	Jean-Claude Juncker
