= Bernard Berg =

Luxembourgish politician (1931–2019)

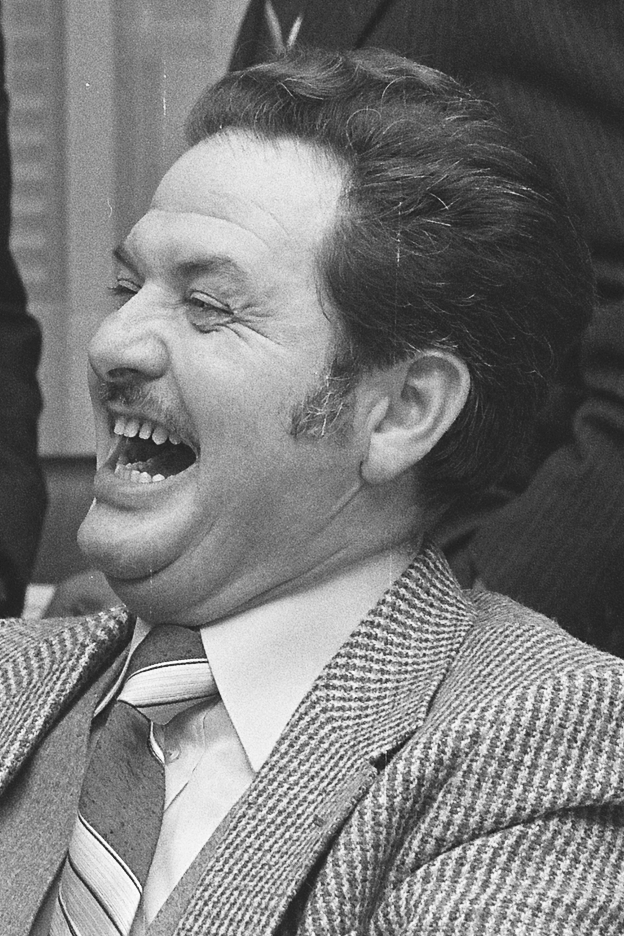
Berg in 1978

Bernard 'Benny' Berg (14 September 1931 – 21 February 2019) was a Luxembourgish politician and trade unionist. In the 1970s, Berg was a leading member of the Luxembourg Socialist Workers' Party, sitting in the Chamber of Deputies and the communal council of Dudelange. When fellow LSAP deputy Raymond Vouel left the government to join the European Commission, Berg took Vouel's place in the Thorn Ministry as Deputy Prime Minister under Gaston Thorn. He would serve in the government again under Pierre Werner.

Political offices
Preceded by Raymond Vouel	Deputy Prime Minister; 1976 – 1979	Succeeded by Gaston Thorn
Trade union offices
Preceded by Antoine Krier	President of the Luxembourg Workers' Union; 1965–1970	Succeeded by Mathias Hinterscheid
