= Raymond Vouel =

Luxembourgish politician

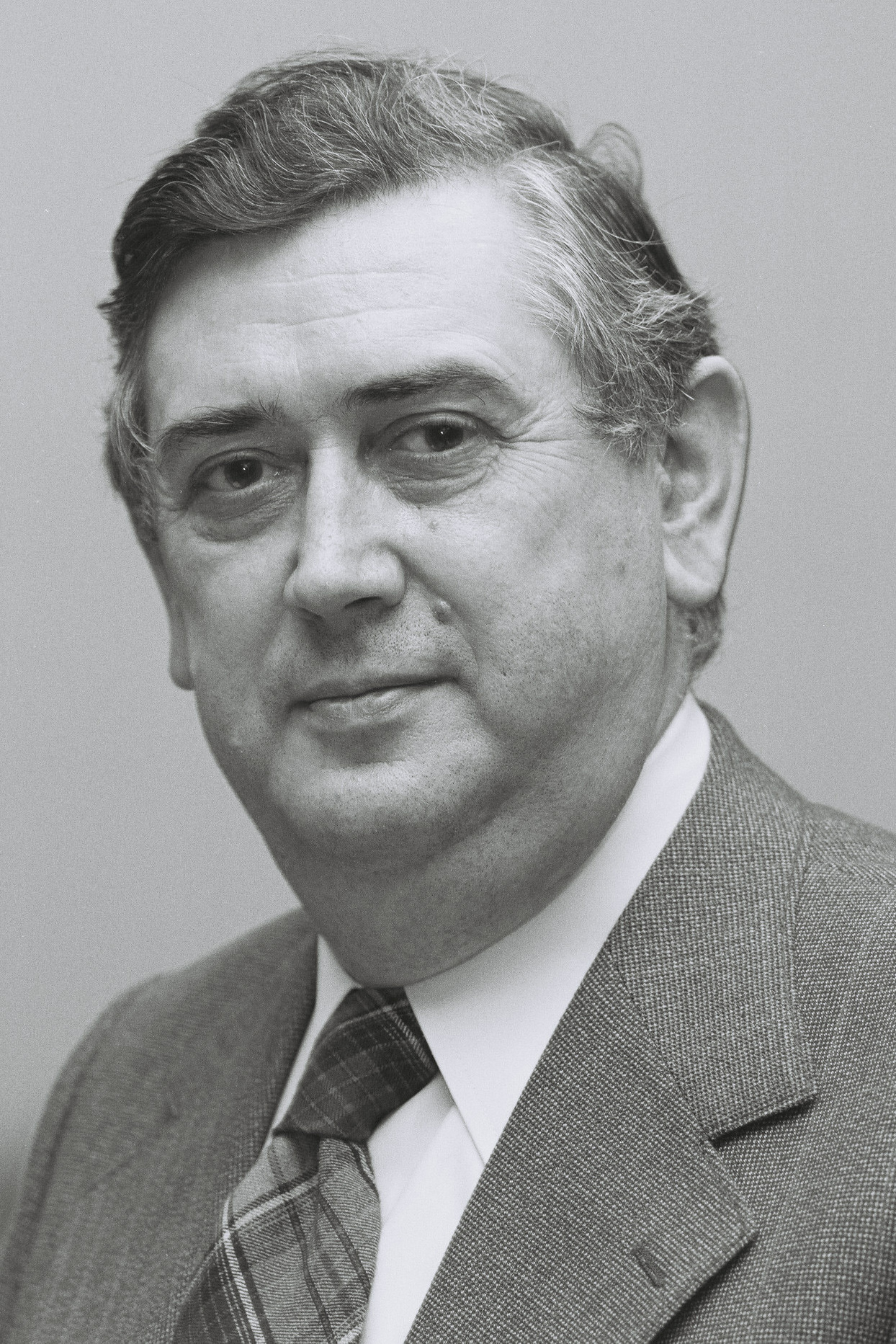
- Official portrait, 1976

European Commissioner for Competition
- In office 6 January 1977 – 6 January 1981
- President: Roy Jenkins
- Preceded by: Albert Borschette
- Succeeded by: Frans Andriessen

Deputy Prime Minister of Luxembourg
- In office 15 June 1974 – 21 July 1976
- Prime Minister: Gaston Thorn
- Preceded by: Eugène Schaus
- Succeeded by: Bernard Berg

Personal details
- Born: Jean-Baptiste Raymond Vouel; 8 April 1923 Rumelange, Luxembourg
- Died: 12 February 1987 (aged 63)
- Party: Luxembourg Socialist Workers' Party

Military service
- Allegiance: Free France; United States
- Branch/service: French Resistance; United States Army
- Battles/wars: World War II

Jean-Baptiste Raymond Vouel (8 April 1923 – 12 February 1987) was a Luxembourgish politician who was Deputy Prime Minister in the Thorn-Vouel cabinet, a coalition between Vouel's Luxembourg Socialist Workers' Party and Gaston Thorn's Democratic Party. On 21 July 1976, Vouel left the government to join the European Commission as European Commissioner for Competition.

Vouel was born on 8 April 1923 in Rumelange. During World War II he was a member of the French Resistance and later served as a translator for the United States Army. He was also a journalist for the socialist daily newspaper Tageblatt, writing articles on international affairs.

Political offices
Preceded by Eugène Schaus	Deputy Prime Minister; 1974–1976	Succeeded by Bernard Berg
Preceded by Pierre Werner	Minister for Finances; 1974–1976	Succeeded by Jacques Poos
Preceded by Albert Borschette	European Commissioner for Competition; 1976–1981	Succeeded by Frans Andriessen
