= Ernest Mühlen =

Luxembourgish politician (1926–2014)

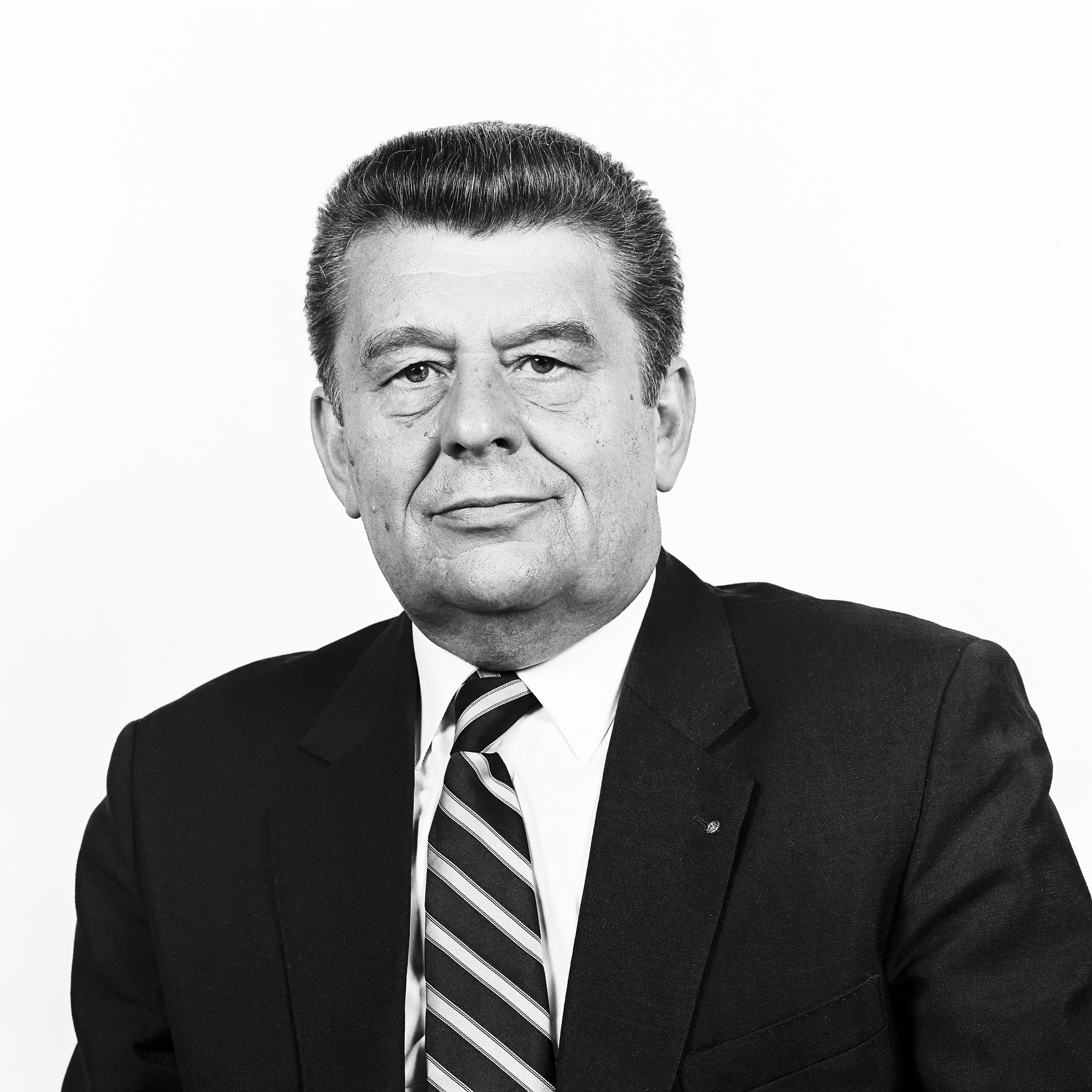
Official portrait, 1984

Ernest Mühlen (8 June 1926 – 19 March 2014) was a Luxembourgish politician for the Christian Social People's Party, economist and financial journalist. He won a place on Luxembourg City's communal council in 1973. He was a government minister under Pierre Werner, in the early 1980s, before sitting in the European Parliament as one of Luxembourg's six MEPs from 1984 until 1989. Mühlen followed this by sitting in the Chamber of Deputies (1989–1991), and by representing Luxembourg at the European Bank for Reconstruction and Development (1991–1996).
