= List of ministers for the police force of Luxembourg =

The minister for the police force (French: ministre de la force publique) was a position in the Luxembourgian cabinet. The minister for the police force shared responsibilities for law and order with the minister for justice.

The position of Minister for the Police Force was created on 6 February 1969, with the role going first to Eugène Schaus. The role remained unchanged until it was scrapped on 7 August 1999, with its responsibilities folded into those of the Minister for the Interior.

== List of ministers for the police force ==
Minister	Party	Start date	End date	Prime Minister
Eugène Schaus	DP	6 February 1969	15 June 1974	Pierre Werner
Émile Krieps	DP	15 June 1974	16 July 1979	Gaston Thorn
Émile Krieps	DP	16 July 1979	20 July 1984	Pierre Werner
Marc Fischbach	CSV	20 July 1984	14 July 1989	Jacques Santer
Jacques Poos	LSAP	14 July 1989	13 July 1994	Jacques Santer
Alex Bodry	LSAP	13 July 1994	26 January 1995	Jacques Santer
Alex Bodry	LSAP	26 January 1995	7 August 1999	Jean-Claude Juncker
