= Robert Krieps =

Luxembourgish politician

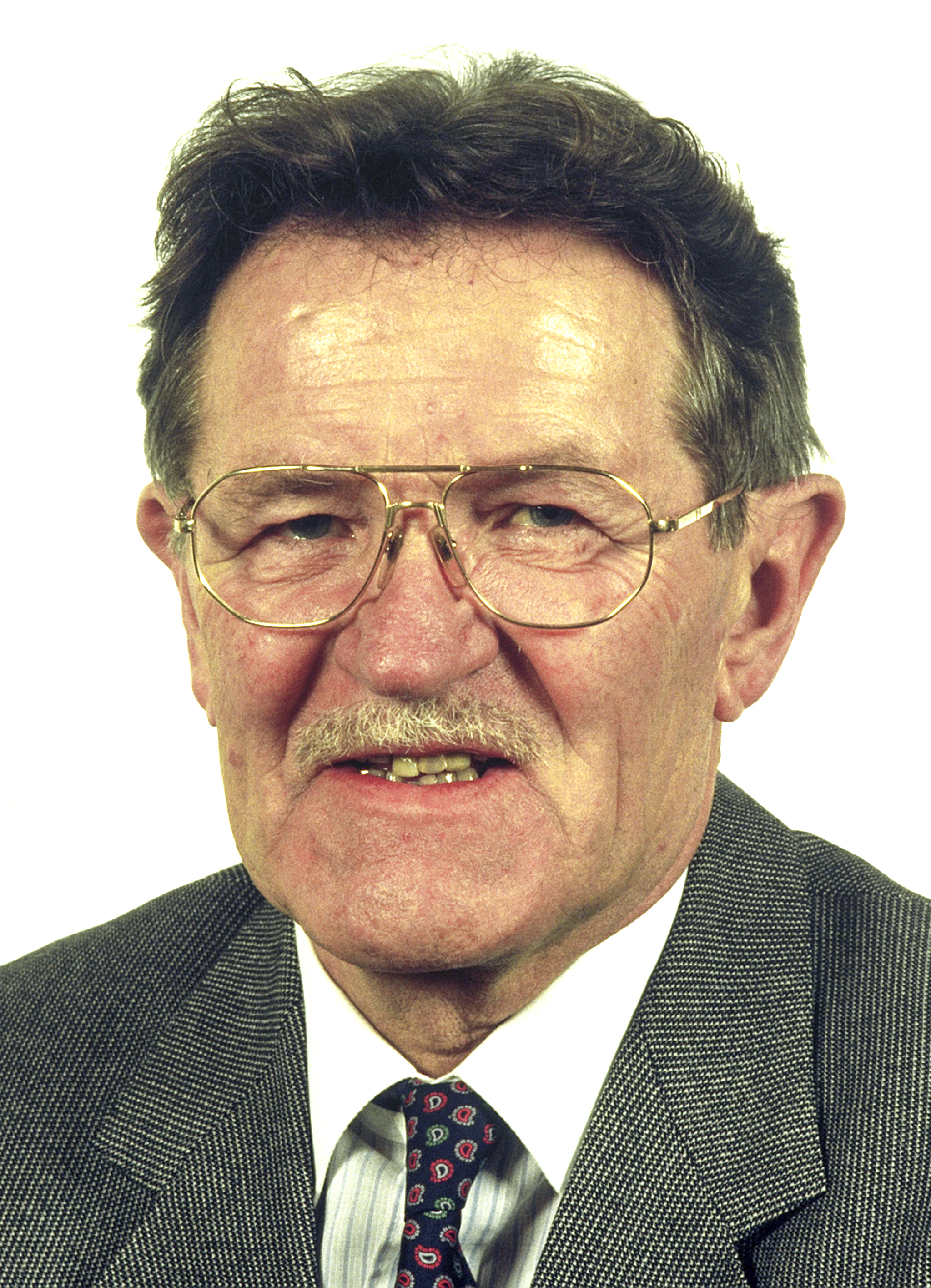
Robert Krieps, 1989

Robert Krieps (15 October 1922 – 1 August 1990) was a Luxembourgish politician. He was the President of the Luxembourg Socialist Workers' Party from 1980 until 1985, and served in the governments of Gaston Thorn and Jacques Santer as Minister of Justice (1974-1979; 1984-1989) and Minister of the Environment (1984-1989).

Krieps was the son of Ernestine (Ehlinger) and Adolphe Krieps. He was married to Renée Ketter. He was the grandfather of Luxembourgish actress Vicky Krieps.

As Minister of Justice, Krieps championed abolition of the death penalty which was accomplished in 1979.

Political offices
Preceded by Eugène Schaus	Minister for Justice (first time); 1974 – 1979	Succeeded by Gaston Thorn
Preceded by Colette Flesch	Minister for Justice (second time); 1984 – 1989	Succeeded by Marc Fischbach
Preceded by Josy Barthel	Minister for the Environment; 1984 – 1989	Succeeded by Alex Bodry
Party political offices
Preceded by Lydie Schmit	President of the LSAP; 1980 – 1985	Succeeded by Ben Fayot
