= Jean Wolter =

Luxembourgish journalist and politician

Jean Wolter (23 February 1926 – 22 February 1980) was a Luxembourgish journalist and politician.

== Life ==
After finishing secondary school, he wanted to study law, but this was not possible due to World War II. Initially, he was made to join a flak unit, then was sent to Poland for forced labour, then was drafted into the Wehrmacht. In 1945, he became a POW for 6 weeks.

After the war, he intended to become a journalist, and was employed briefly by the Luxemburger Wort. In 1967, he entered the Chamber of Deputies as a member of the CSV. In 1970, he was elected to the city council of Esch-sur-Alzette. From 1974 onwards, he was the vice-president of the CSV. In 1979, he became the Minister for Families and the Interior, as well Minister for Public Housing and for Social Solidarity in the Werner-Thorn-Flesch government. He was also briefly a Member of the European Parliament from 16 June to 18 July 1979, representing Luxembourg and a member of the European People's Party Group. On 22 February 1980 he died of lung cancer.

He was the father of politician Michel Wolter.
