= Jean-Pierre Büchler =

Luxembourgish politician

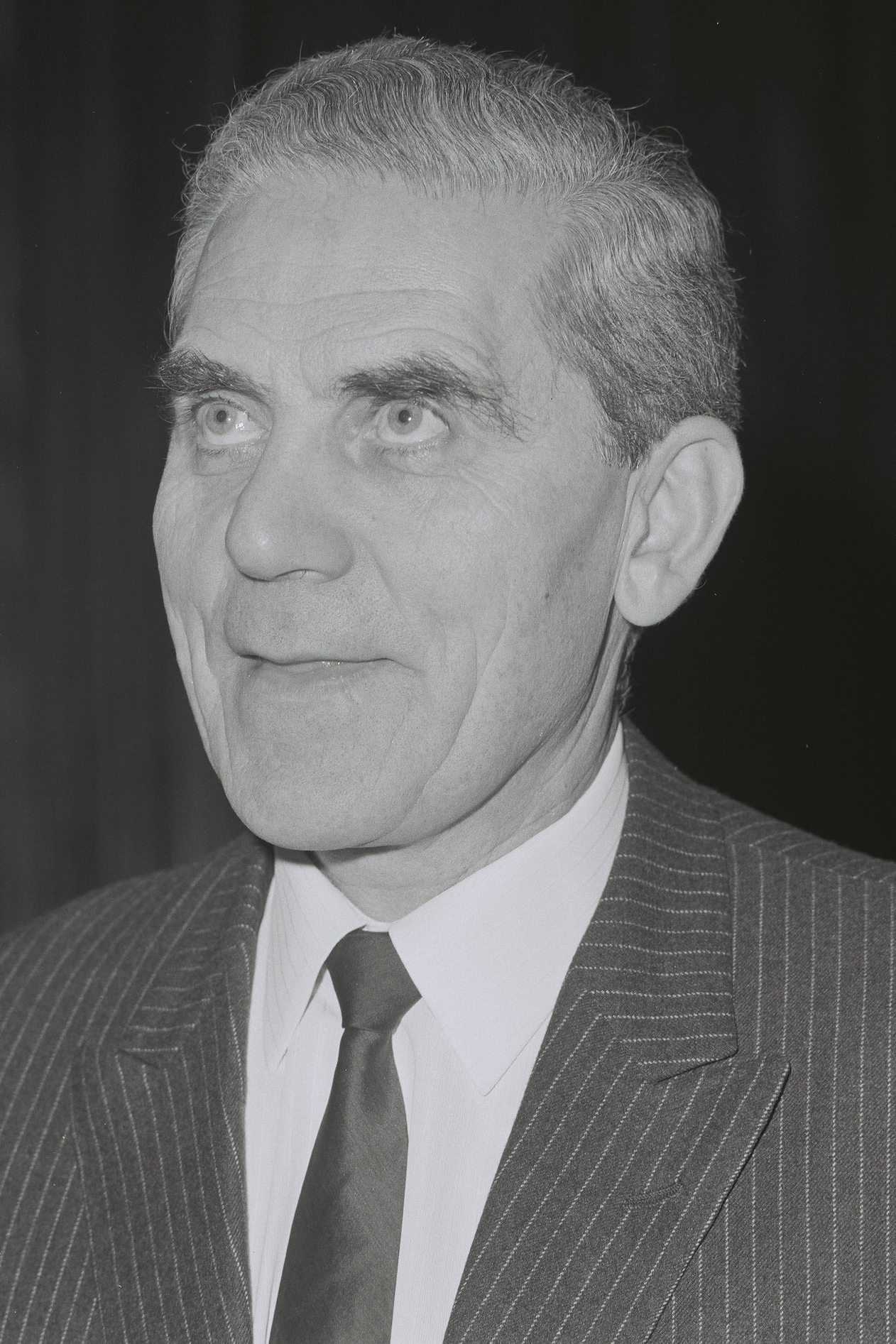
- Büchler in 1968

Member of the Chamber of Deputies
- In office 1974–1978
- Constituency: East

Minister for Agriculture and Viticulture
- In office 1964–1974
- Prime Minister: Pierre Werner

Minister for Public Works
- In office 1969–1974
- Prime Minister: Pierre Werner

Personal details
- Born: 6 July 1908
- Died: 7 September 1993 (aged 85)
- Party: Christian Social People's Party
- Awards: Grand Officer of the Order of Orange-Nassau

Jean-Pierre Büchler (6 July 1908 – 7 September 1993) was a Luxembourgish politician.

He was an agronomist by profession. A member of the Christian Social People's Party he served in many ministerial roles. From 1964 to 1974 he served as the Minister of Agriculture and Viticulture under Pierre Werner. From 1969 to 1974 he also served as the Minister of Public Works also under Pierre Werner. From 1972 to 1974 he also served as the Minister of Family and Minister of Social Solidarity and Housing under Pierre Werner.

From 1974 to 1978 he was a member of the Chamber of Deputies for the East constituency.

In Luxembourg City, the bridge over the railway from the Place de la Gare to Bonnevoie is named after him.
