= Jean Dupong =

Luxembourgish politician (1922–2007)

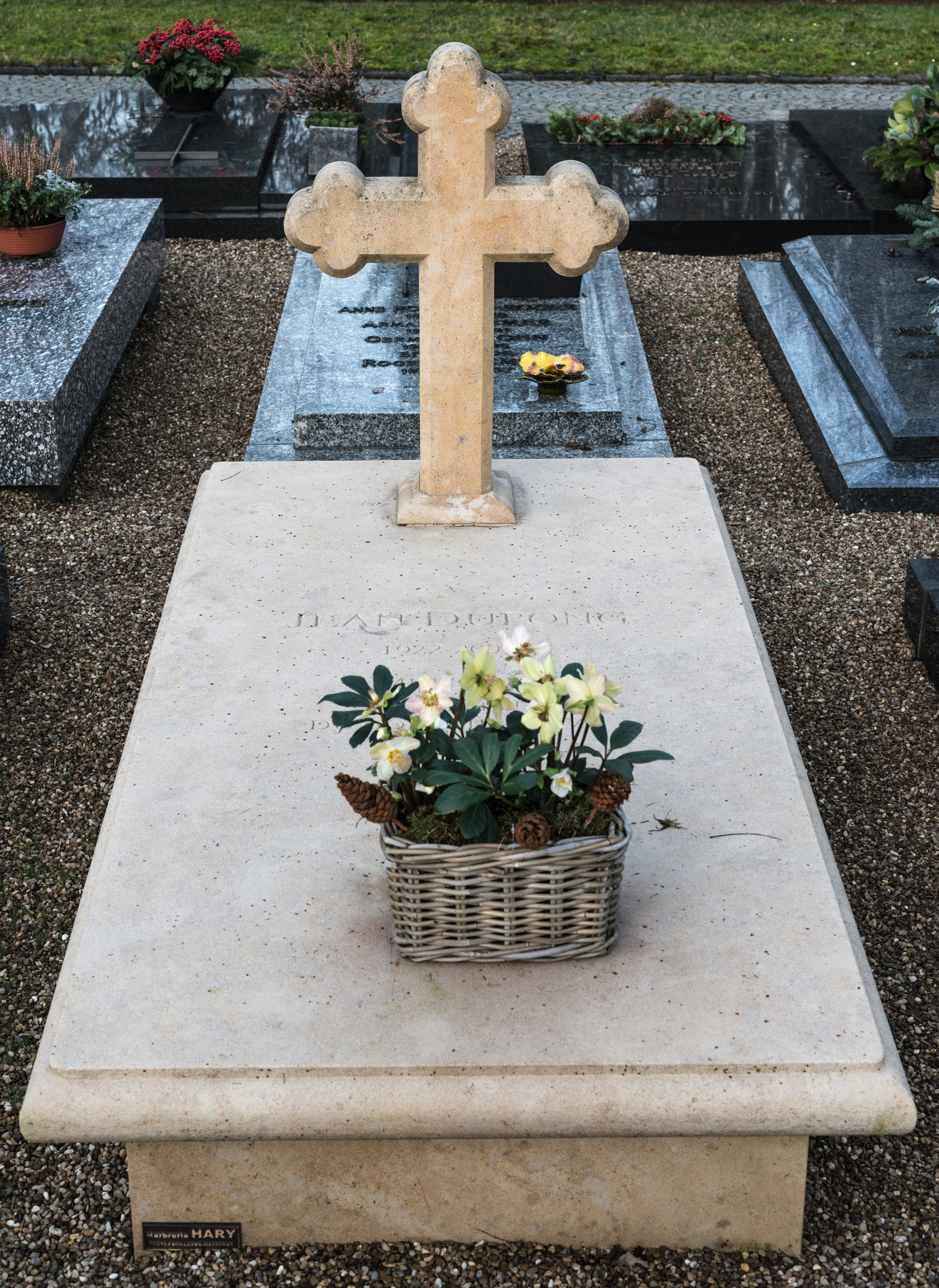
His grave, Merl cemetery.

Marie Jean Pierre Georges Dupong (18 May 1922 – 6 December 2007) was a Luxembourgish politician. A member of the Christian Social People's Party (CSV), Dupong held a number of positions in government and within the party.

Dupong was first elected to the Chamber of Deputies in the 1954 election. He would be re-elected until his retirement from the Chamber in 1979. During this time, he was a member of Pierre Werner's cabinet from 1967 to 1974, including as Minister for Justice from 1967 to 1969. Dupong was also President of the CSV from 1965 to 1972.

Dupong was appointed to the Council of State in 1979, in which he sat until 1994. He served as the Council's Vice-President (1988–91), before becoming President (1991–94): becoming the most prominent politician to hold the position since Léon Kauffman in 1952.

He was the son of former Prime Minister Pierre Dupong.

== Footnotes ==
Political offices
Preceded by Pierre Werner	Minister for Justice; 1967–1969	Succeeded by Eugène Schaus
Preceded by Georges Thorn	President of the Council of State; 1991–1994	Succeeded by Paul Beghin
Party political offices
Preceded by Tony Biever	President of the CSV; 1965–1972	Succeeded by Nicolas Mosar
