= Gaston Thorn =

Luxembourgish politician (1928–2007)

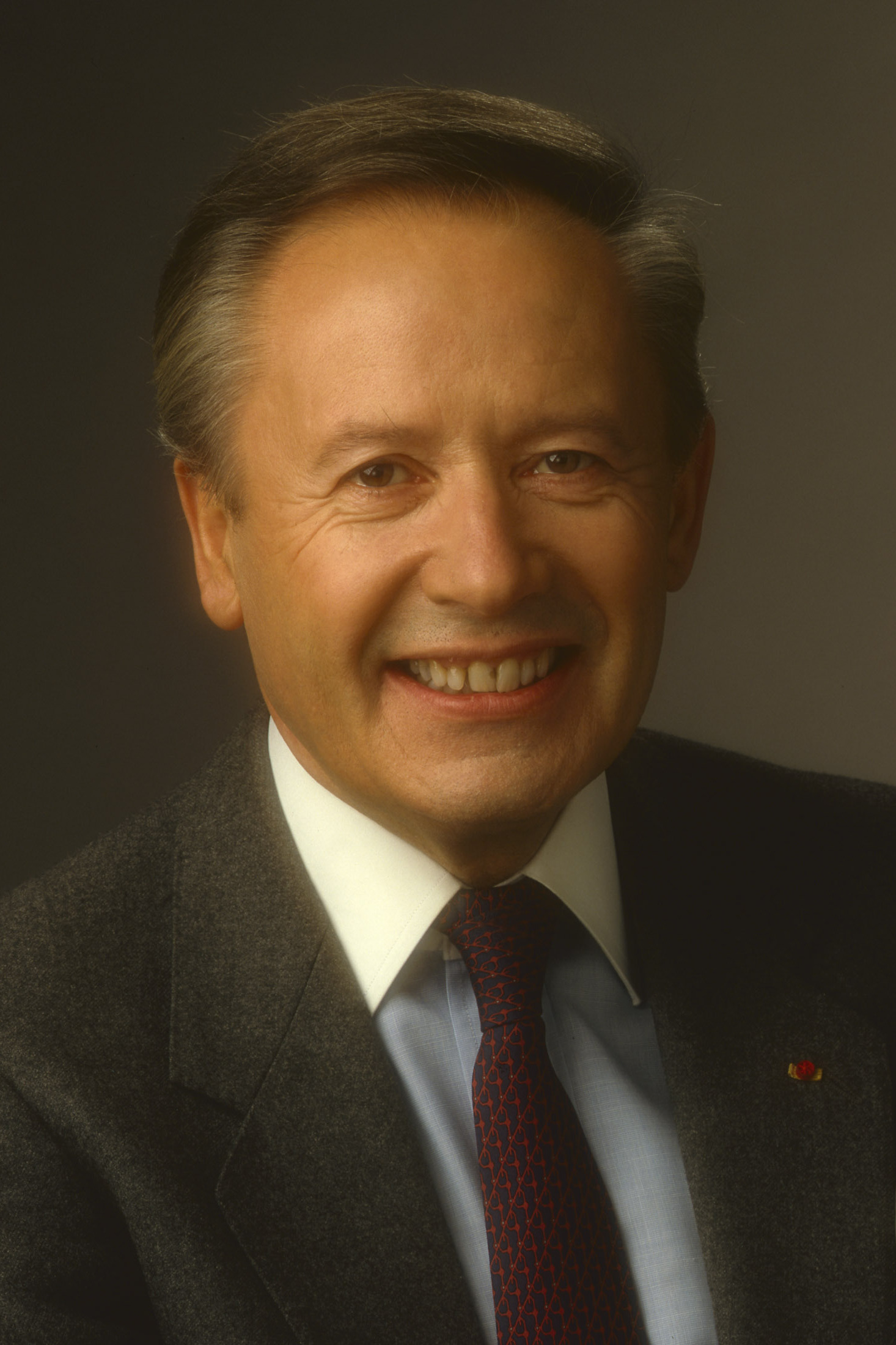
- Thorn in 1990

President of the European Commission
- In office 20 January 1981 – 6 January 1985
- Preceded by: Roy Jenkins
- Succeeded by: Jacques Delors

Minister of Foreign Affairs and Foreign Trade
- In office 1 February 1969 – 22 November 1980
- Prime Minister: Pierre Werner; Himself; Pierre Werner
- Preceded by: Pierre Grégoire
- Succeeded by: Colette Flesch

Deputy Prime Minister of Luxembourg
- In office 16 July 1979 – 22 November 1980
- Prime Minister: Pierre Werner
- Preceded by: Benny Berg
- Succeeded by: Colette Flesch

Prime Minister of Luxembourg
- In office 15 June 1974 – 16 July 1979
- Monarch: Jean
- Deputy: Raymond Vouel; Benny Berg
- Preceded by: Pierre Werner
- Succeeded by: Pierre Werner

President of the United Nations General Assembly
- In office 1975–1976
- Preceded by: Abdelaziz Bouteflika
- Succeeded by: Hamilton Shirley Amerasinghe

Member of the Chamber of Deputies
- In office 25 November 1980 – 5 January 1981
- Preceded by: Colette Flesch
- Succeeded by: Jean-Paul Rippinger
- Constituency: Centre
- In office 5 March 1959 – 1 February 1969
- Constituency: Centre

Personal details
- Born: Gaston Egmond Thorn; 3 September 1928 Luxembourg, Luxembourg
- Died: 26 August 2007 (aged 78) Luxembourg, Luxembourg
- Party: Democratic
- Spouse: Liliane Thorn-Petit
- Children: 1

Gaston Egmond Thorn (3 September 1928 – 26 August 2007) was a Luxembourgish politician who served in a number of high-profile positions, both domestically and internationally. He most prominently served as prime minister of Luxembourg (1974–1979), President of the United Nations General Assembly (1975), and president of the European Commission (1981–1985).

== Life and career ==
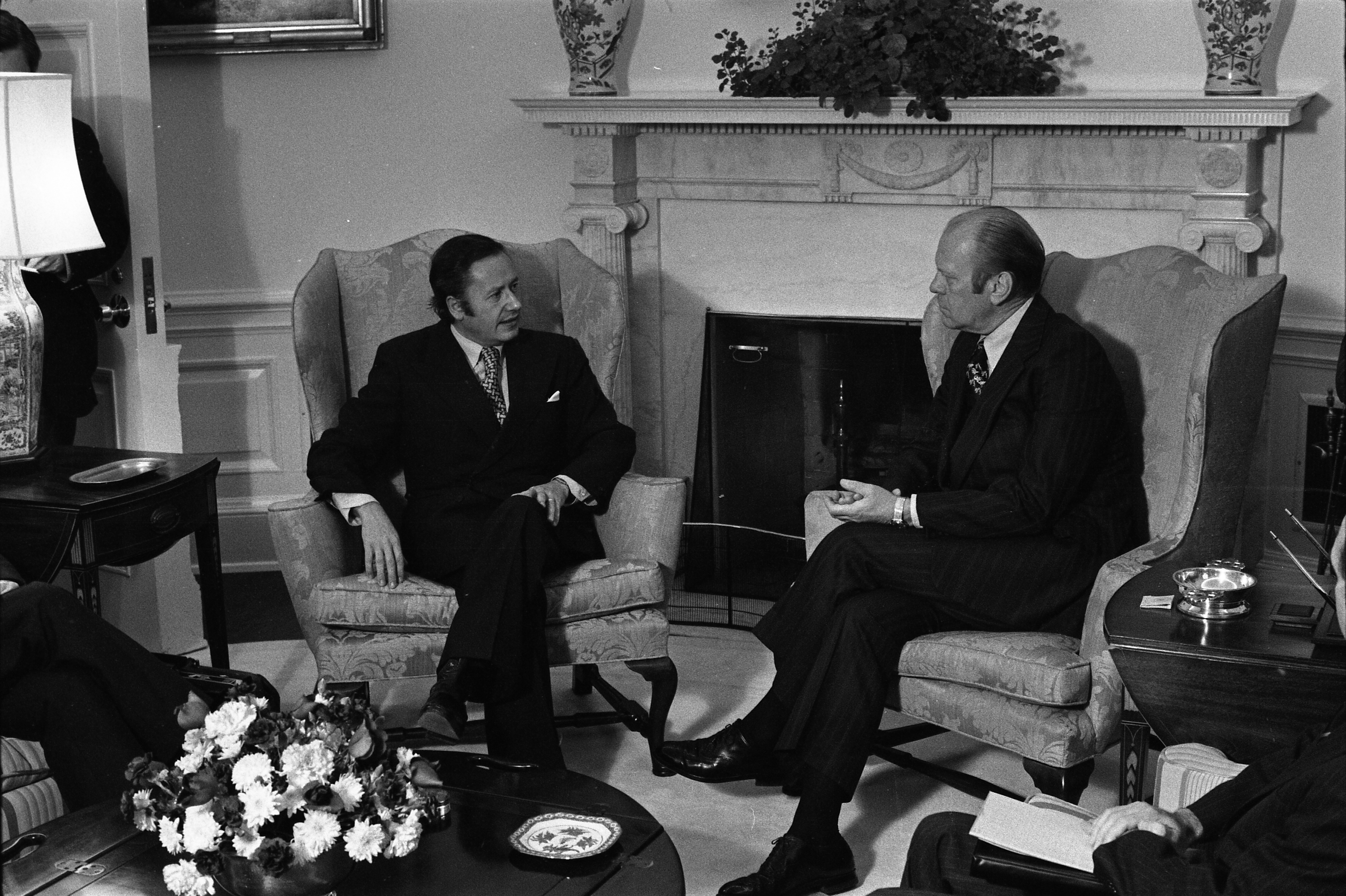
Thorn with U.S. president Gerald Ford in the Oval Office, 1975

Thorn was born in Luxembourg City. His early childhood, however, was spent in Strasbourg, where his father worked for the French railways. At the outbreak of World War II the family returned to Luxembourg. While still at school he engaged in resistance activities during the German occupation, and spent several months in prison. After the war, he initially studied medicine in Montpellier, then switched to law, and continued his studies in Lausanne and Paris, and practised law in Luxembourg from 1955. In 1957, he married Liliane Petit, a journalist. He entered politics in 1959, representing the liberal Democratic Party. He was a member of the European Parliament from 1959 to 1969. He was Chairman of the Democratic Party from 1962 to 1969. From 1961 to 1963, he was one of the aldermen of the City of Luxembourg.

Thorn was Foreign Minister and Foreign Trade Minister of Luxembourg from 1969 to 1980, Prime Minister from 1974 to 1979 and Minister of Economics from 1977 to 1980. He was also President of the United Nations General Assembly from 1975 to 1976 for its 30th session.

As Prime Minister from 1974 to 1979, he presided over a socialist-liberal coalition between his own Democratic Party and the Luxembourg Socialist Workers' Party. This was the first Luxembourg government since World War II that did not involve the dominant Christian Social People's Party (CSV), and similarly, he was the first non-CSV prime minister since the war. He was the head of government even though his party had fewer seats in the legislature than its coalition partner.

== European Commission ==
Thorn (second from the left) at the 1983 G7 summit

In 1980, Thorn was chosen as president of the commission of the European Communities (now called the European Union), in succession to Roy Jenkins. He took office on 12 January 1981. France and Britain had been against his appointment as commission president, whereas his candidature was supported by the smaller countries and by West Germany because of Luxembourg's involvement in building up the commission.

His presidency was marked by several difficulties. It coincided with a time of economic and political crisis, of Eurosclerosis, inside the European Community. Relations between the commission and British government under Margaret Thatcher declined, over her demands that Britain should be compensated by other countries for its share of payments towards the commission budget. There was also tension due to other EC governments' reservations about Britain's role in the Falklands War; and due to some European leaders' opposition to United States foreign policy and the deployment of cruise missiles and Pershing missiles in Europe. This was in addition to the long-running international recession and occasional threats of trade wars. This all "combined to put the aspirations of Thorn and other supporters of European integration on hold". However, as EC President, Thorn did manage to reach agreement on a common fisheries policy, and laid the basis for Portugal and Spain joining the European Community. Greece had just joined when his mandate started in 1981.

Although Thorn was not considered a very forceful commission president, during his term of office, the commission continued to expand its power, both at the expense of the national governments of EC members and of the European Parliament, with which it engaged in a constant power struggle. In this, Thorn laid the groundwork for his successor Jacques Delors, who took the commission to the height of its power.

== Post-Presidency ==
After leaving the commission presidency in 1985, Thorn went into business. He was chairman of Luxembourg's largest media company CLT, and president of the Banque Internationale à Luxembourg from 1985 to 1999.

Thorn remained active in international and political affairs, as President of the International European Movement and as a member of the Trilateral Commission, the Bilderberg conference and of the Jean Monnet Committee. He was also president of the Liberal International. He was married to Liliane Thorn-Petit (1933–2008), a journalist, with whom he had one son.

Thorn died on 26 August 2007 in Luxembourg City from a severe illness. Following his death, Luxembourgish flags were flown at half-mast for three days. He received a state funeral at Notre-Dame Cathedral in Luxembourg City on 30 August, at which prime minister Jean-Claude Juncker gave the eulogy.

== Honours ==
- Grand Cross of the Order of Adolphe of Nassau
- Grand Cross of the Pian Order
- Grand Cross of the Legion of Honour
- Honorary Knight Grand Cross of the Royal Victorian Order
- Honorary Knight Grand Cross of the Order of St Michael and St George

== See also ==
- List of prime ministers of Luxembourg
- Thorn-Vouel-Berg Government
- Werner-Thorn Government

Political offices
Preceded by Pierre Grégoire	Minister for Foreign Affairs; 1969–1980	Succeeded by Colette Flesch
Preceded by Edzo Toxopeus	President of the Liberal International; 1970–1982	Succeeded by Giovanni Malagodi
Preceded by Pierre Werner	Prime Minister of Luxembourg; 1974–1979	Succeeded by Pierre Werner
Preceded by Marcel Mart	Minister for the Economy; 1977–1980	Succeeded by Colette Flesch
Preceded by Bernard Berg	Deputy Prime Minister; 1979–1980	Succeeded by Colette Flesch
Preceded by Robert Krieps	Minister for Justice; 1979–1980	Succeeded by Colette Flesch
Preceded by Roy Jenkins	President of the European Commission; 1980–1985	Succeeded by Jacques Delors
Diplomatic posts
Preceded by Abdelaziz Bouteflika	President of the United Nations General Assembly; 1975–1976	Succeeded by Hamilton Shirley Amerasinghe
Party political offices
Preceded by Lucien Dury	President of the DP; 1st time 1962–1969	Succeeded by René Konen
Preceded by René Konen	President of the DP; 2nd time 1971–1980	Succeeded by Colette Flesch
Academic offices
Preceded by Bruno Kreisky	College of Europe Orateur; 1982	Succeeded by Garret FitzGerald
