= Juncker–Poos Government =

Government of Luxembourg

Juncker-Polfer Government
- Cabinet of Luxembourg
- 1995-1999
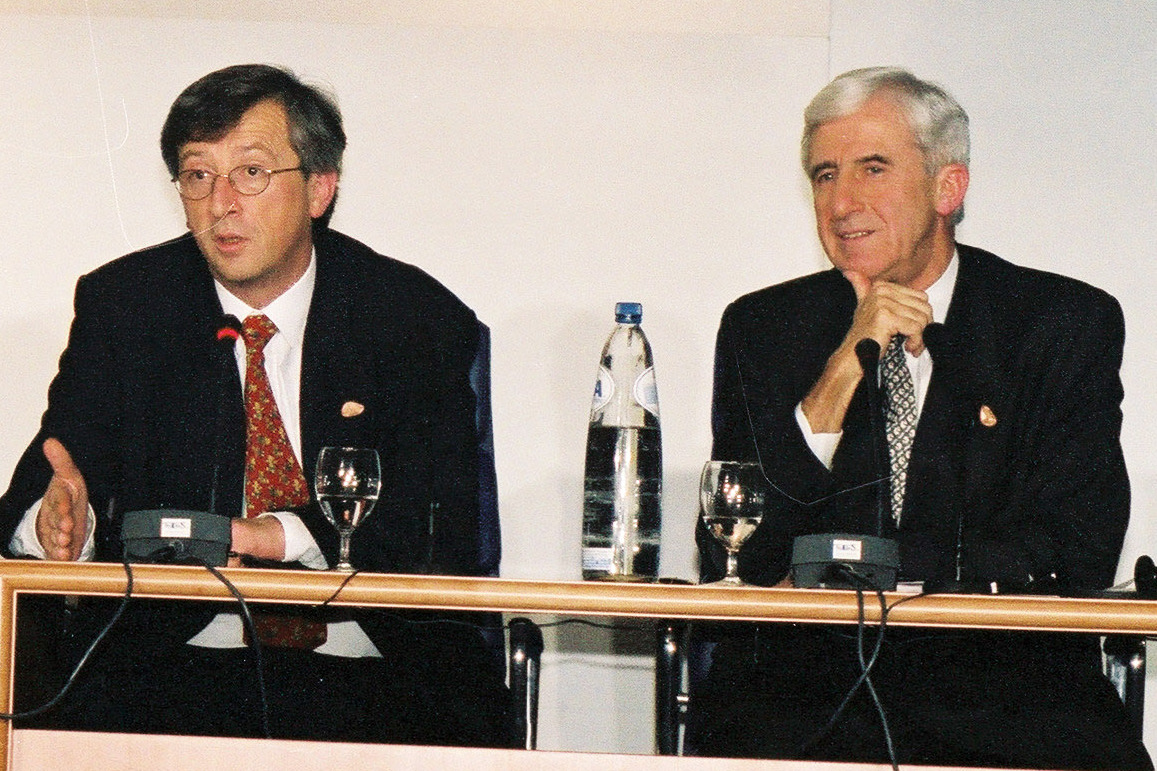
- Juncker and Poos in 1997
- Date formed: 26 January 1995
- Date dissolved: 7 August 1999 (4 years, 6 months, 1 week and 5 days)

People and organisations
- Grand Duke: Jean
- Prime Minister: Jean-Claude Juncker
- Deputy Prime Minister: Jacques Poos
- Total no. of members: 12
- Member parties: CSV; LSAP
- Status in legislature: Centre-left to centre-right coalition government
- Opposition parties: DP; ADR; Greens (Note: Created from the merger of GAP and GLEI in 1995)
- Opposition leader: Henri Grethen (Note: De facto leader of the opposition as the leader of the largest opposition group in the Chamber of Deputes.)

History
- Election: 1994 general election
- Legislature term: 29th Legislature of the Chamber of Deputies
- Predecessor: Santer-Poos III Government
- Successor: Juncker–Polfer Government

The Juncker–Poos Government was the government of Luxembourg between 26 January 1995 and 7 August 1999. It was led by, and named after, Prime Minister Jean-Claude Juncker and Deputy Prime Minister Jacques Poos.

Juncker became Prime Minister after his predecessor, Jacques Santer, was appointed President of the European Commission. However, the Juncker–Poos Ministry was essentially a continuation of the third Santer-Poos Ministry, both being coalitions between Santer's and Juncker's Christian Social People's Party (CSV) and Poos' Luxembourg Socialist Workers' Party (LSAP), the largest and second-largest parties in the legislature.

The Juncker-Poos government came to an end after the general election of 1999, in which the CSV remained the largest party, but the LSAP was beaten into third place by the Democratic Party. Hence, the CSV formed a new coalition with the DP.

== Ministers ==
=== 26 January 1995 – 4 February 1998 ===
Name	Party	Office
Jean-Claude Juncker	CSV	Prime Minister; Minister for Finances; Minister for Work and Employment
Jacques Poos	LSAP	Deputy Prime Minister; Minister for Foreign Affairs, Foreign Trade, and Cooperation
Fernand Boden	CSV	Minister for Agriculture, Viticulture, and Rural Development; Minister for the Middle Class and Tourism; Minister for Housing
Marc Fischbach	CSV	Minister for Justice; Minister for the Budget; Minister for Relations with Parliament
Johny Lahure	LSAP	Minister for Health; Minister for the Environment
Robert Goebbels	LSAP	Minister for the Economy; Minister for Public Works; Minister for Energy
Alex Bodry	LSAP	Minister for Planning; Minister for the Police Force; Minister for Physical Education and Sport; Minister for Youth
Marie-Josée Jacobs	CSV	Minister for the Family; Minister for Women; Minister for the Handicapped and Injured
Mady Delvaux-Stehres	LSAP	Minister for Social Security; Minister for Transport; Minister for Communications
Erna Hennicot-Schoepges	CSV	Minister for National Education and Vocational Training; Minister for Culture; Minister for Religion
Michel Wolter	CSV	Minister for the Interior; Minister for the Civil Service and Administrative Reform
Georges Wohlfart	LSAP	Secretary of State for Foreign Affairs, Foreign Trade, and Cooperation; Secretary of State for Public Works

=== 4 February 1998 – 7 August 1999 ===
Name	Portrait	Party	Office
Jean-Claude Juncker		CSV	Prime Minister; Minister for Finances; Minister for Work and Employment
Jacques Poos		LSAP	Deputy Prime Minister; Minister for Foreign Affairs, Foreign Trade, and Cooperation
Fernand Boden		CSV	Minister for Agriculture, Viticulture, and Rural Development; Minister for the Middle Class and Tourism; Minister for Housing
Robert Goebbels		LSAP	Minister for the Economy; Minister for Public Works; Minister for Energy
Alex Bodry		LSAP	Minister for Planning; Minister for the Police Force; Minister for the Environment; Minister for Youth
Marie-Josée Jacobs		CSV	Minister for the Family; Minister for Women; Minister for the Handicapped and Injured
Mady Delvaux-Stehres		LSAP	Minister for Social Security; Minister for Transport; Minister for Communications
Erna Hennicot-Schoepges		CSV	Minister for National Education and Vocational Training; Minister for Culture; Minister for Religion
Michel Wolter		CSV	Minister for the Interior; Minister for the Civil Service and Administrative Reform
Georges Wohlfart		LSAP	Minister for Health; Minister for Physical Education and Sport
Luc Frieden		CSV	Minister for Justice; Minister for the Budget; Minister for Relations with Parliament
Lydie Err		LSAP	Secretary of State for Foreign Affairs, Foreign Trade, and Cooperation; Secretary of State for Public Works

== Transition ==
The Prime Minister Jacques Santer had been appointed to be President of the European Commission from 23 January 1995. He resigned on 20 January 1995 as Prime Minister.

The Grand Duke received Santer as the outgoing Prime Minister, to thank him for services rendered. The Grand Duke then received Jean-Claude Juncker, the Minister for Finances and Minister for Work. Appointed as Prime Minister, he also retained the portfolios of Finances and Work.

Juncker then took his oath of office before the Grand Duke under the terms of article 110 of the Constitution, and immediately took office.

=== Reshuffle ===
On 26 January 1995, the Juncker undertook a reshuffle of the ministerial departments. Two new members joined the government: Michel Wolter took over the Ministries of the Interior, the Civil and Administrative Reform, while Erna Hennicot-Schoepges became Minister for National Education and Vocational Training, Minister for Culture and Minister for Religion. Jean Spautz became President of the Chamber of Deputies, and was no longer part of the new government. During the formation of the government, a new Ministry of Women was created, and given to Marie-Josée Jacobs.

A ministerial reshuffle took place on 30 January 1998 after the resignations of Marc Fischbach and Johny Lahure. Marc Fischbach had been appointed a judge of the European Court of Human Rights on 27 January 1998. Luc Frieden took over the Ministry of Justice. He was also charged with the Budget and Relations with Parliament. Lydie Err became secretary of State for Foreign Affairs, Foreign Trade and Cooperation, while Georges Wohlfart was promoted to Minister for Health, Physical Education and Sports. Alex Bodry took over the portfolio of the Environment.

== Foreign policy ==
In the European sphere, the government gave priority to questions of employment, tax harmonisation, and the introduction of the single currency. When it came to employment, it advocated the idea that all European countries should enact a minimum wage. In terms of the harmonisation and coordination of fiscal policies, the Luxembourgish authorities were not opposed to a regulation at the level of all European states of the question of the withholding tax. But this had to take account of the interests of all member states. A minimal taxation of capital revenues had to go hand in hand with progress in the area of taxation of businesses. The most spectacular performance of the European Union during this period was certainly the introduction of the euro on 1 January 1999. During the Luxembourgish presidency of the Council of the European Union in 1997, significant advances were achieved in the long process of creating a common currency. In 1996, Luxembourg, along with other member states of the European Union, had concluded the growth and stability pact which was to guarantee the stability of the future single currency.

As a NATO member, Luxembourg participated in the search for a solution to the wars in the former Yugoslavia. The Luxembourgish government supported the NATO military intervention in Kosovo, and put in place reception facilities to take in refugees and granted emergency aid of 1 billion Luxembourgish francs for the reconstruction of areas devastated by the conflict.

== Economic policy ==
During the period 1995-1999, Luxembourg experienced strong economic growth. In 1998, this reached 5,7%, while inflation was at its lowest level at 1%. This was the effect of a stability policy which had been made the condition for joining the European economic and monetary union. The expansion also made itself felt in employment. From 1995 to 1998, 29,700 new jobs were created. Nevertheless, the unemployment rate remained relatively high at 3%. If the job market continued to grow at the same rate and the population grew in similar proportion, the Grand-Duchy would have 400,000 workers and 700,000 residents by 2025. This perspective, strongly expressed by the government, justified an ambitious policy of investment in infrastructure. From 1994 to 1998, the Luxembourgish state invested 74,2 billion francs in the economy. The South collector road linked the cities of the mining basin, which continued to suffer from the decline of the steel industry, while the urban motorway of the south facilitated access to the capital. The Motorway of the North would open up the Oesling. The motorway of the Saar, when finished, would complete the road circle of the Greater Region. As the road network could not absorb the mass of everyday travellers, the government also prepared a traffic plan which integrated buses, trams and railways, the BTB (Bus-Tram-Bunn). Just like the BTB, the TGV-Est was of great importance to maintain the country's attractiveness as a business location. Luxembourg also pledged to participate in the cost of the construction of the Paris-Luxembourg railway line up to 4,6 billion francs.

Apart from the investments in infrastructure, the continuation of the development of the Kirchberg plateau represented a large burden on the State's budget. These works represented the government's desire to turn the zone that was initially dedicated to European institutions into a quarter of Luxembourg City in its own right, which would include residential, commercial and leisure areas. A central point of the development was the transformation of the old motorway into an urban boulevard.

The development of the audiovisual sector and the media was a priority. The government continued to support the expansion of SES, which could be considered the jewel of the policy of diversification pursued since the steel crisis. In 1997, the SES operated 11 satellites and Astra channels were received by 70 million viewers. With 2,7 billion francs paid in taxes and licence fees, the SES was the principal contributor towards the Luxembourgish State's finances.

== Social policy ==
In the social sphere, the government continued to develop the idea of the Luxembourgish model. One of its major concerns was to avoid the unemployment situation getting worse. The Tripartite on employment met twice during the legislative period. During the tripartite meeting, the social partners agreed on a policy of wage restraint. It was agreed that pay increases would respect the development of productivity. When it came to pensions, government policy aimed to guarantee the system of the legal pension, its level and its possibilities. The government especially tried to narrow the gap between the retirement and pensions systems of the public and private sectors.

== Cultural policy ==
In 1995, Luxembourg was the European City of Culture. This positioned Luxembourg on the international cultural scene and gave a new impulse to national cultural policy. The government launched a vast programme of construction of museums and cultural institutions, especially the Musée d’art moderne Grand-Duc Jean and the Museum of the Fortress in the ruins of Fort Thüngen, a philharmonic hall on the Place de l’Europe, a Centre Culturel de Rencontre in the buildings of the old Neimënster Abbey. Apart from these projects, the Casino – Forum d’art contemporain pursued its policy of raising awareness of art, started during the cultural year 1995. The "Centre national de littérature" was inaugurated on 13 October 1995. In 1996, the National Museum of Natural History, newly renovated, opened its doors. At the end of the legislative period, the renovation of the National Museum of History and Art was started.
