= Santer-Poos Ministry =

There were three Santer-Poos Ministries:

- Santer-Poos Ministry I
- Santer-Poos Ministry II
- Santer-Poos Ministry III
