= Santer-Poos II Government =

Government of Luxembourg

- Cabinet of Luxembourg
- 1989-1994
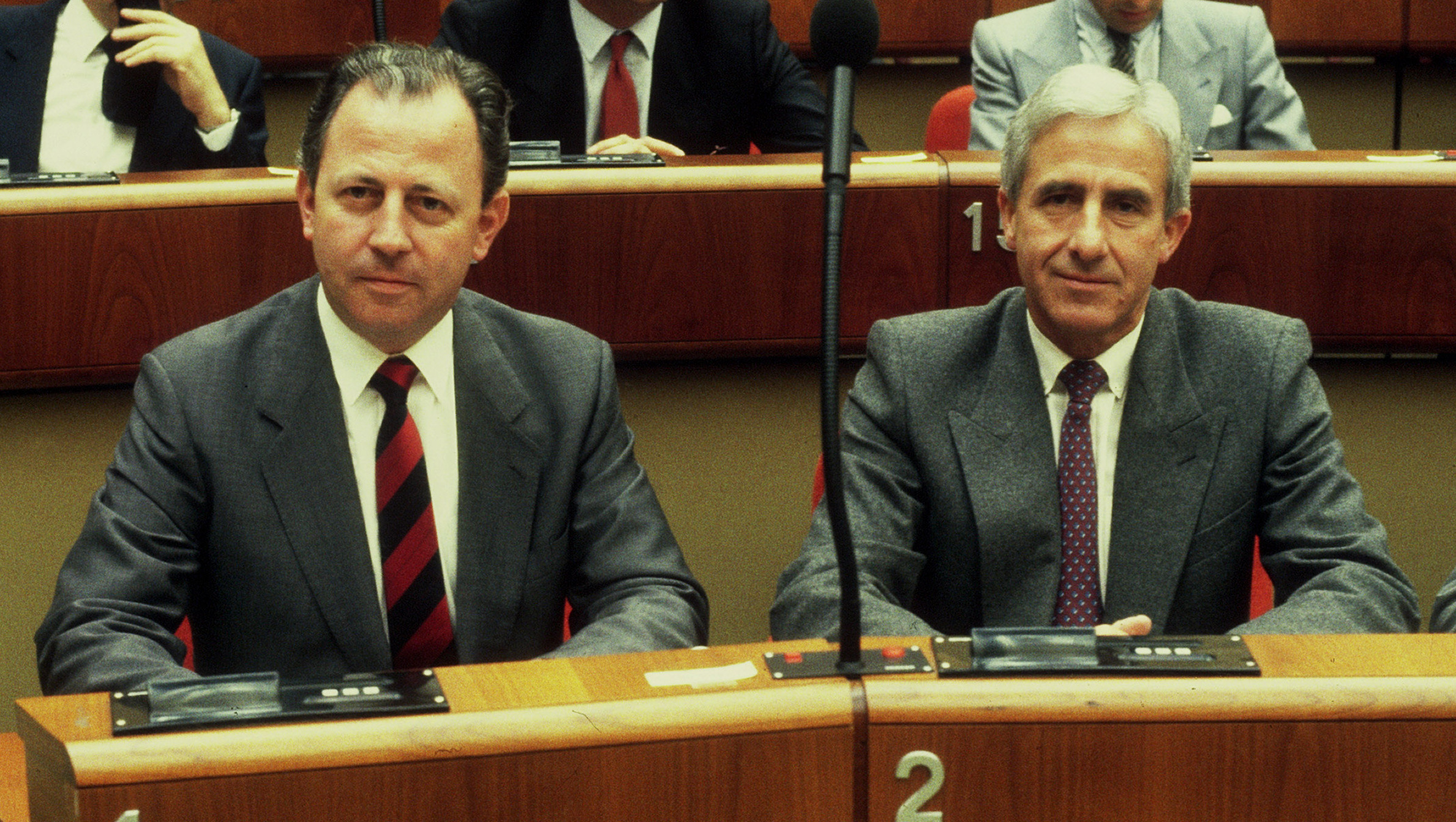
- Santer (left) and Poos (right) in 1989
- Date formed: 14 July 1989
- Date dissolved: 13 July 1994 (4 years, 11 months, 4 weeks and 1 day)

People and organisations
- Grand Duke: Jean
- Prime Minister: Jacques Santer
- Deputy Prime Minister: Jacques Poos
- Total no. of members: 12
- Member parties: CSV; LSAP
- Status in legislature: Centre-left to centre-right coalition government
- Opposition parties: DP; ADR; GLEI; GAP; KPL
- Opposition leader: Henri Grethen (Note: De facto leader of the opposition as the leader of the largest opposition group in the Chamber of Deputes.)

History
- Election: 1989 general election
- Legislature term: 28th Legislature of the Chamber of Deputies
- Predecessor: Santer-Poos I Government
- Successor: Santer-Poos III Government

The Santer-Poos II Government was the government of Luxembourg between 14 July 1989 and 13 July 1994. It was the second of three led by, and named after, Prime Minister Jacques Santer. Throughout the ministry, the Deputy Prime Minister was Jacques Poos.

It was formed following the general election of 1989. It represented a coalition between Santer's Christian Social People's Party (CSV) and Poos' Luxembourg Socialist Workers' Party (LSAP), which had once more been elected the largest and second-largest parties in the legislature.

== Background ==
The general election of 18 June 1989 confirmed the existing government coalition in power. The CSV received 22 seats, with the LSAP receiving 18. This gave the CSV-LSAP government a solid majority in the legislature, amid a divided opposition. From then on, 7 parties were represented in the Chamber of Deputies. In addition to the traditional parties, the CSV, the LSAP, the Democratic Party, and the Communist Party, there were two Green parties and an Action Committee for Democracy and Pensions Justice.

=== Reshuffle ===
The government was reshuffled on 9 December 1992 after René Steichen was appointed to the European Commission. Marie-Josée Jacobs took over the portfolios of Agriculture and Cultural Affairs.

== Foreign policy ==
In the European integration process, Luxembourg saw itself as both a mediator and a builder. When the Single Market came into force on 1 January 1993, this opened new perspectives for the Luxembourgish economy, which depended almost entirely on foreign markets. However, economic integration also presented dangers. During EC negotiations, the Luxembourgish government opposed a harmonisation of indirect taxation, which would have been harmful to cross-border trade; and also opposed a withholding tax, which would have seen capital flee from the Luxembourg financial centre.

The question of the seat of European institutions played a major role in the essential interests of the Grand-Duchy. In the decision of Edinburgh on 12 December 1992, the government succeeded in making permanent the establishment in Luxembourg of those organs and services which had until then been there provisionally. It also managed to obtain the headquarters of the Translation Centre for the Bodies of the European Union, and that of the Court of First Instance. Apart from European integration, the key elements of the government's foreign policy were promotion of foreign trade, attracting investments, and development aid.

== Economic policy ==
The period of 1989-1994 was marked by the launch of the Single European Market (1993) and Luxembourg's definitive integration in the economic part of the European Community. From the early 1990s, there was an increase in cross-border movements, which benefited the Luxembourgish economy and supported growth. For its economic development, Luxembourg was strongly dependent on trade with neighbouring regions. The Greater Region not only provided an increasing proportion of the workforce, but also contributed significantly to the fiscal stability of the Grand Duchy through the direct and indirect taxes paid by the cross-border workers.

The medium-term future of the steel industry seemed secure, even though employment continued to decrease in this industrial branch. ARBED pursued its programmes of improving its productivity and re-centring on its strategic activities. The government concentrated its efforts on regional aid, small and medium businesses and research and development. Thus, the decrease in jobs in steel was partially compensated by the creation of 45 businesses from 1989 to 1993. Particular attention was given to the media and audiovisual sectors. Through the law of 11 April 1990 on the creation of a National Fund for the Support of Audiovisual Production and the law of 27 July 1991 on electronic media, the government tried to put the country in a favourable position for a market with strong growth potential.

The financial centre, which continued to develop and diversify, made up an increasing part of GDP. In 1992, the reintroduction of the withholding tax (Quellensteuer) in Germany led to the establishment of new German banks in the Grand Duchy. In parallel, the public finances' dependence on the financial sector increased. In 1994, while the banks only employed one-tenth of the workforce, they paid a quarter of income taxes. The levies paid by investment funds and holding companies made up a significant part of public revenue. Confronted with attacks in the international press attempting to discredit banking activities in Luxembourg, the government took measures to strengthen its control over the financial sector. The law of 7 July 1989 included provisions to act against money-laundering. The law of 5 April 1993 on the financial sector fixed the conditions of banking secrecy and obliged credit institutions to know their clients. The law of 22 December 1993 on tax fraud was directed at fraudulent activities which affect the public interest. This bundle of measures, when hand in hand with a strengthening of the powers of the regulatory authorities, and aimed to safeguard the moral reputation of the Luxembourgish financial centre abroad.

== Domestic policy ==
The Santer-Poos government enacted a programme which provided for a reform of pensions and health insurance, measures to support families, innovations in secondary education and the consolidation of financing of hospitals.

Government policy also increasingly took environmental protection into consideration. The government launched a campaign to make the public aware of the problem of energy waste, and created an Energy Agency to promote energy savings. Environmental policy became an area for cooperation in the Greater Region.

== Ministers ==
=== 14 July 1989 – 9 December 1992 ===
Name	Party	Office
Jacques Santer	CSV	Prime Minister; Minister for the Treasury; Minister for Cultural Affairs
Jacques Poos	LSAP	Deputy Prime Minister; Minister for Foreign Affairs, Foreign Trade, and Cooperation; Minister for the Police Force
Fernand Boden	CSV	Minister for the Family and Solidarity; Minister for the Middle Class and Tourism
Jean Spautz	CSV	Minister for the Interior; Minister for Social Housing and Town Planning
Jean-Claude Juncker	LSAP	Minister for Finances; Minister for Work
Marc Fischbach	CSV	Minister for National Education; Minister for Justice; Minister for the Civil Service
Johny Lahure	LSAP	Minister for Health; Minister for Social Security; Minister for Physical Education and Sport; Minister for Youth
René Steichen	CSV	Minister for Agriculture, Viticulture, and Rural Development; Minister-Delegate for Cultural Affairs and Scientific Research
Robert Goebbels	LSAP	Minister for the Economy; Minister for Public Works; Minister for Transport
Alex Bodry	LSAP	Minister for Planning and the Environment; Minister for Energy
Georges Wohlfart	LSAP	Secretary of State for Foreign Affairs, Foreign Trade, and Cooperation; Secretary of State for the Police Force
Mady Delvaux-Stehres	LSAP	Secretary of State for Health; Secretary of State for Social Security; Secretary of State for Physical Education and Sport; Secretary of State for Youth
Source: Service Information et Presse

=== 9 December 1992 – 13 July 1994 ===
Name	Portrait	Party	Office
Jacques Santer		CSV	Prime Minister; Minister for the Treasury; Minister for Cultural Affairs
Jacques Poos		LSAP	Deputy Prime Minister; Minister for Foreign Affairs, Foreign Trade, and Cooperation; Minister for the Police Force
Fernand Boden		CSV	Minister for the Family and Solidarity; Minister for the Middle Class and Tourism
Jean Spautz		CSV	Minister for the Interior; Minister for Social Housing and Town Planning
Jean-Claude Juncker		LSAP	Minister for Finances; Minister for Work
Marc Fischbach		CSV	Minister for National Education and Scientific Research; Minister for Justice; Minister for the Civil Service
Johny Lahure		LSAP	Minister for Health; Minister for Social Security; Minister for Physical Education and Sport; Minister for Youth
Robert Goebbels		LSAP	Minister for the Economy; Minister for Public Works; Minister for Transport
Alex Bodry		LSAP	Minister for Planning and the Environment; Minister for Energy; Minister for Communications
Marie-Josée Jacobs		CSV	Minister for Agriculture, Viticulture, and Rural Development; Minister-Delegate for Cultural Affairs
Georges Wohlfart		LSAP	Secretary of State for Foreign Affairs, Foreign Trade, and Cooperation; Secretary of State for the Police Force
Mady Delvaux-Stehres		LSAP	Secretary of State for Health; Secretary of State for Social Security; Secretary of State for Physical Education and Sport; Secretary of State for Youth
