= Santer-Poos III Government =

Government of Luxembourg from 1994 to 1995

- Cabinet of Luxembourg
- 1994-1995
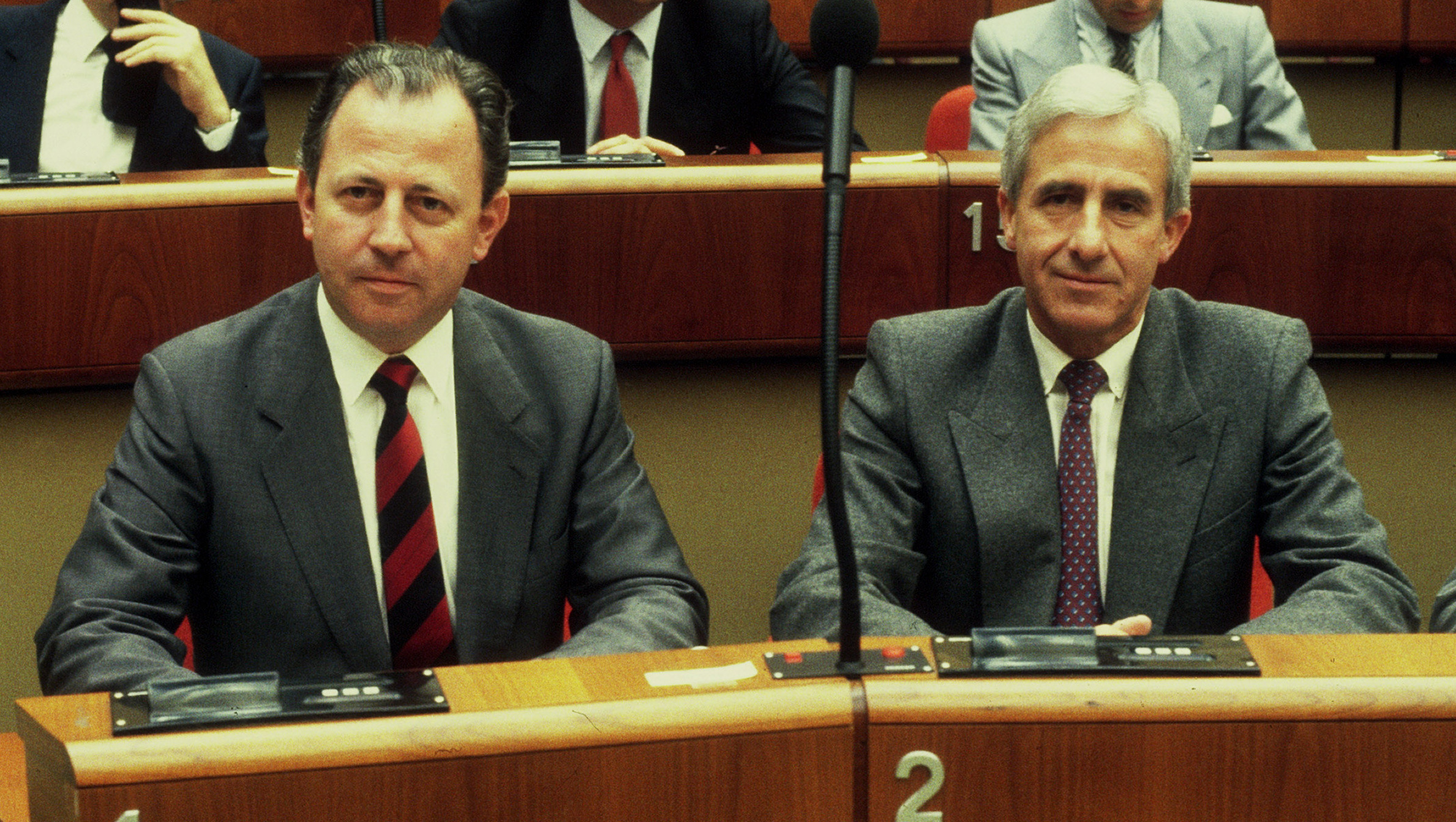
- Santer (left) and Poos (right) in 1989
- Date formed: 13 July 1994
- Date dissolved: 20 January 1995 (6 months and 1 week)

People and organisations
- Grand Duke: Jean
- Prime Minister: Jacques Santer
- Deputy Prime Minister: Jacques Poos
- Total no. of members: 12
- Member parties: CSV; LSAP
- Status in legislature: Centre-left to centre-right coalition government
- Opposition parties: DP; ADR; GAP; GLEI
- Opposition leader: Henri Grethen (Note: De facto leader of the opposition as the leader of the largest opposition group in the Chamber of Deputes.)

History
- Election: 1994 general election
- Legislature term: 29th Legislature of the Chamber of Deputies
- Predecessor: Santer-Poos II Government
- Successor: Juncker–Poos Government

The Santer-Poos III Government was the government of Luxembourg between 13 July 1994 and 20 January 1995. It was the third of three led by, and named after, Prime Minister Jacques Santer. Throughout the ministry, the Deputy Prime Minister was Jacques Poos.

It was formed following the general election of 1994. It represented a coalition between Santer's Christian Social People's Party (CSV) and Poos' Luxembourg Socialist Workers' Party (LSAP), which had once more been elected the largest and second-largest parties in the legislature.

== Ministers ==
Name	Portrait	Party	Office
Jacques Santer		CSV	Prime Minister; Minister for the Treasury; Minister for Cultural Affairs
Jacques Poos		LSAP	Deputy Prime Minister; Minister for Foreign Affairs, Foreign Trade, and Cooperation
Fernand Boden		CSV	Minister for the Family and Solidarity; Minister for the Middle Class and Tourism; Minister for the Civil Service
Jean Spautz		CSV	Minister for the Interior; Minister for Housing
Jean-Claude Juncker		LSAP	Minister for Finances; Minister for Work
Marc Fischbach		CSV	Minister for National Education and Scientific Research; Minister for Justice
Johny Lahure		LSAP	Minister for Health; Minister for the Environment
Robert Goebbels		LSAP	Minister for the Economy; Minister for Public Works; Minister for Energy
Alex Bodry		LSAP	Minister for Planning; Minister for the Police Force; Minister for Physical Education and Sport; Minister for Youth
Marie-Josée Jacobs		CSV	Minister for Agriculture, Viticulture, and Rural Development; Minister-Delegate for Cultural Affairs
Mady Delvaux-Stehres		LSAP	Minister for Social Security; Minister for Transport; Minister for Communications
Georges Wohlfart		LSAP	Secretary of State for Foreign Affairs, Foreign Trade, and Cooperation
Source: Service Information et Presse

== Formation ==
At the general election of 12 June 1994, the CSV and the LSAP remained the two strongest parties and received 21 and 17 seats respectively. The third-placed party, the Democratic Party, received only 12 Deputies in the new Chamber. The Greens (Déi Gréng GLEI/GAP) and the "action committee" ADR (Aktiounskomitee fir Demokratie a Rentegerechtegkeet) each received five representatives in the parliament. The CSV and LSAP decided to continue their coalition: the Santer-Poos partnership entered its third legislative period.

The government was later reshuffled after Jacques Santer was appointed president of the European Commission on 23 January 1995. The European Council of heads of state and of government, in Brussels on 15 July 1994, had designated the Luxembourgish Prime Minister to this post to succeed Jacques Delors.

== Foreign policy ==
The government's policy was marked by the implementation of the Maastricht Treaty and the enlargement and deepening of the European Union. It aimed to reaffirm Luxembourg's place in a united Europe that was respectful of differences. Luxembourg wanted to be a full partner, while preserving its identity and specificity.

== Domestic policy ==
Domestically, the government was faced with a considerable need for public investments, especially with regards to roads, schools infrastructure, the hospital sector and refuse collection and waste-water infrastructure. The key points of government action were, apart from improvement of infrastructure, educational reform, environmental protection, the modernisation of public administration as well as family policy and social security.
