= Michel Wolter =

Luxembourgish politician

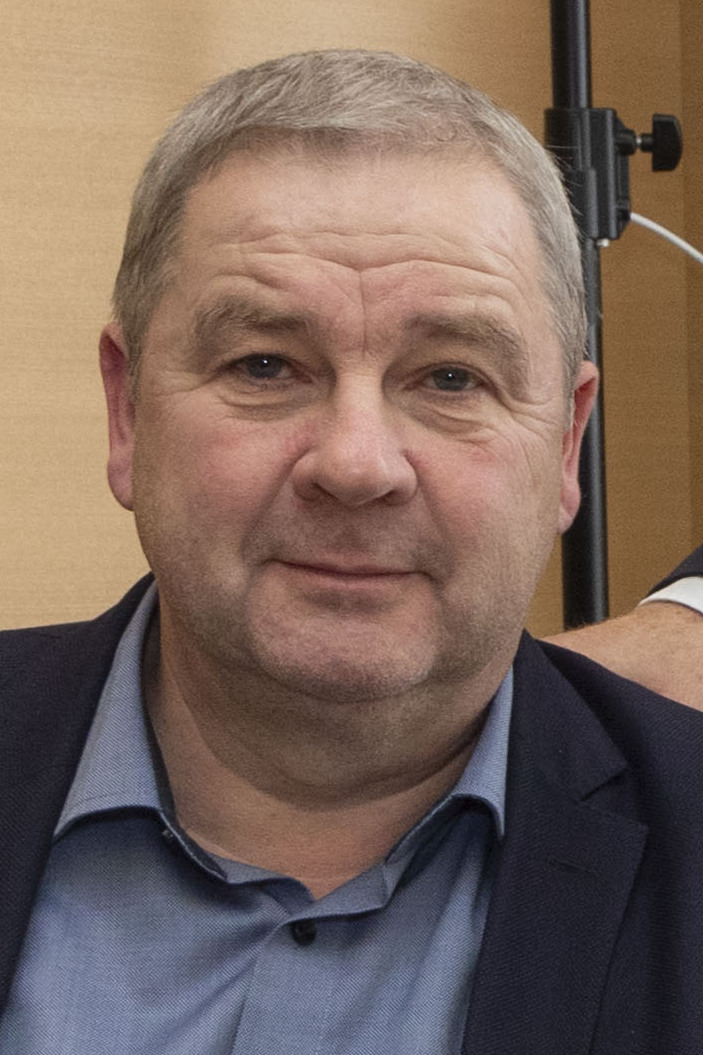
Michel Wolter

Michel Wolter (born 13 September 1962 in Luxembourg City) is a Luxembourgish politician. He was the youngest-ever member of the Chamber of Deputies when elected in 1984, and served as Minister for the Interior from 1995 to 2004. He is also a businessman and a former international table tennis player.

Michel Wolter grew up in Esch-sur-Alzette, the second largest city of the country. He studied economics at the University of Paris 1 Panthéon-Sorbonne from 1981 to 1985. Wolter was an international table tennis player from 1980 to 1984. He was elected to the Chamber of Deputies at the 1984 election, on the Christian Social People's Party ticket. Aged 21 at that time, he is today still the youngest ever elected member. He was directly reelected in 1989, 1994, 1999, 2004, 2009 and 2013, 2018 and 2023.

From 1985 to 1990, Wolter was chairman of the youth organisation of his party. In 1987, he became President of the Luxembourg Tennis Federation, in which capacity he served until 1994. From January 1988 to July 1992, he was a member of Esch-sur-Alzette communal council, and, after a change of residence, from January 1994 to January 1995, member of the communal council of Bascharage.

On 26 January 1995, Wolter was nominated as a cabinet member in the new government as Minister of the Interior and Minister for the Civil Service and Administrative Reform.

After the 1999 election, he was reappointed as Minister for the Interior, with enlarged competences in the fields of police and water administration. After the 2004 election, he resigned from the government to become president of the Christian Social People's Party group in Parliament. He terminated this mandate after the 2009 election.

In November 2009 he became the leader of Luxembourg's Christian Social People's Party.

Since January 2006, Wolter has again been a council member in Bascharage. He was appointed mayor in January 2010. He was reappointed after the elections of 2011 and 2017.

Professionally, Wolter was involved from 1986 to 1995 successively in the fields of captive reinsurance management, fiduciary management and professional reinsurance. Since the end of 2006, he has been a board member of various companies in Luxembourg. He is married, father of three children, and lives in Bascharage.

Sporting positions
Preceded by Georges Logelin	President of the Luxembourg Tennis Federation; 1987–1994	Succeeded by Paul Helminger
Party political offices
Preceded by Lucien Weiler	President of the Christian Social People's Party in the Chamber of Deputies; 2004 – 2009	Succeeded by Jean-Louis Schiltz
