= 1984 Luxembourg general election =

- 17 June 1984
- All 64 seats in the Chamber of Deputies; 33 seats were needed for a majority
- Turnout: 88.81% (▼0.04 pp)
Party	Leader	Vote %	Seats	+/–
CSV	Jacques Santer	34.89	25	+1
LSAP	Jacques Poos	33.57	21	+7
DP	Colette Flesch	18.68	14	−1
Green Alternative		5.16	2	New
KPL		5.04	2	0
This lists parties that won seats. See the complete results below.
Most voted-for party by municipality and constituency
Prime Minister before	Prime Minister after
Pierre Werner; CSV	Jacques Santer; CSV

General elections were held in Luxembourg on 17 June 1984. The Christian Social People's Party remained the largest party, winning 25 of the 64 seats in the Chamber of Deputies. It formed a coalition government with the Luxembourg Socialist Workers' Party, the Santer-Poos government.

== Results ==
Party	Votes	%	Seats	+/–
Christian Social People's Party	1,148,085	34.89	25	+1
Luxembourg Socialist Workers' Party	1,104,740	33.57	21	+7
Democratic Party	614,627	18.68	14	–1
Green Alternative	169,862	5.16	2	New
Communist Party of Luxembourg	165,960	5.04	2	0
Independent Socialist Party	81,002	2.46	0	–1
Revolutionary Communist League	6,686	0.20	0	0
Total	3,290,962	100.00	64	+5
Valid votes	179,994	93.92		
Invalid/blank votes	11,657	6.08		
Total votes	191,651	100.00		
Registered voters/turnout	215,792	88.81		
Source: Government of Luxembourg
