= List of deputy prime ministers of Luxembourg =

Deputy Prime Minister of Principality of Luxembourg
- Luxembourgish: Vize-Premierminister vu Lëtzebuerg; French: Vice-Premier ministre luxembourgeois German: Vize-Premierminister von Luxemburg
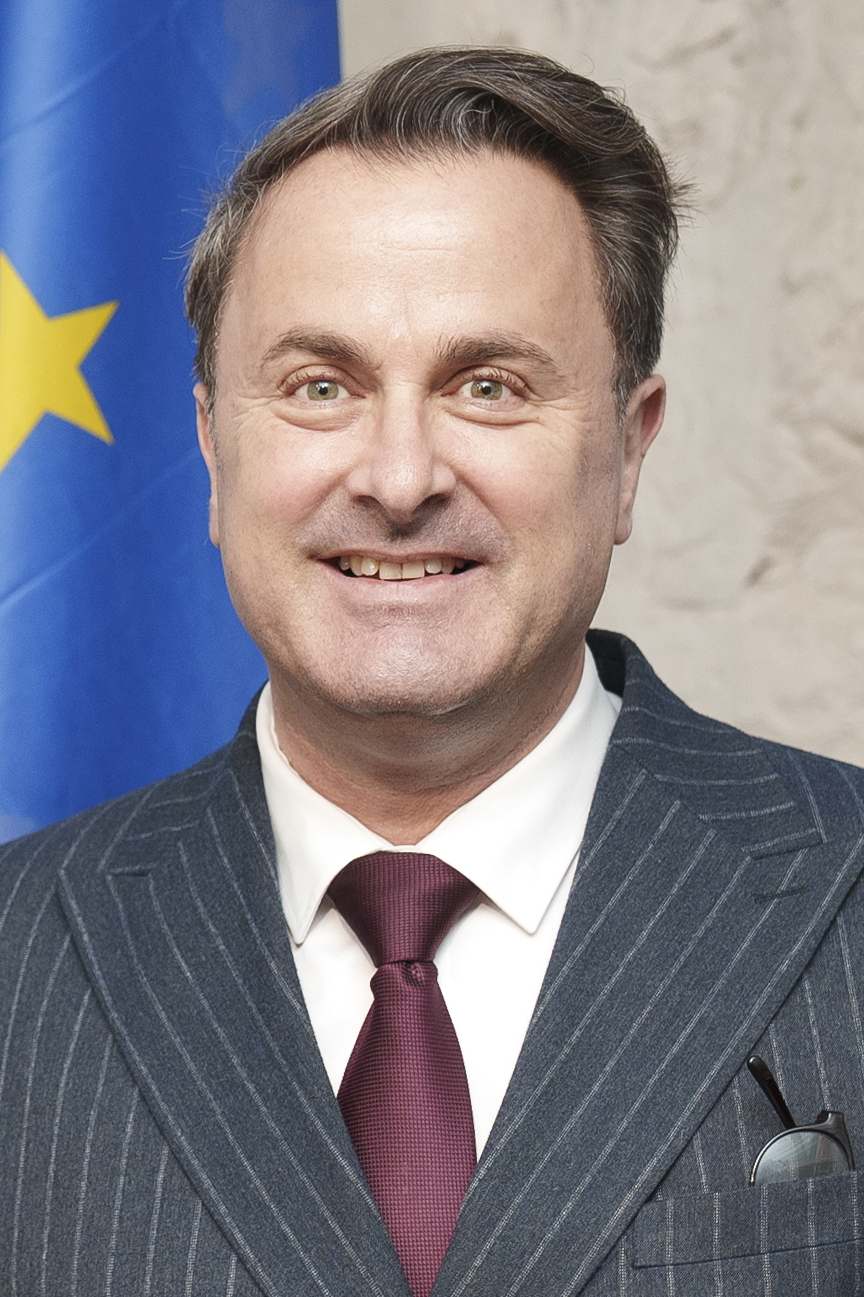
- Incumbent; Xavier Bettel since 17 November 2023
- Executive branch of the Grand Duchy of Luxembourg
- Style: Mr. Deputy Prime Minister (informal); The Honourable (formal)
- Status: Second highest executive branch officer
- Member of: Cabinet
- Seat: Luxembourg City
- Appointer: Prime Minister
- Term length: No fixed term
- Constituting instrument: Constitution of the Grand Duchy of Luxembourg
- Formation: 2 March 1959; 67 years ago
- First holder: Eugène Schaus
- Unofficial names: Vice Prime Minister "Vize Premier"
- Website: gouvernement.lu

The deputy prime minister of Luxembourg (Luxembourgish: Vize-Premierminister vu Lëtzebuerg, lit. 'Vice-Prime Minister of Luxembourg') is the second-highest position in the government of Luxembourg. The deputy serves a vital function in Luxembourg's collegiate cabinet system, deputises for the prime minister when he is absent, represents their own political party, and holds other government positions.

Since the position was created, in 1959, almost all governments have been coalitions of two of the three major parties: the Christian Social People's Party (CSV), the Luxembourg Socialist Workers' Party (LSAP), and the Democratic Party (DP). The current government consists of the CSV and the DP. The deputy prime minister has always been a leading politician from the junior coalition partner. During Xavier Bettel's second term as Prime Minister (2018-2023), the position was shared by a First and Second Deputy Prime Minister, representing the two junior partners in the coalition respectively (the LSAP and déi Gréng).

Since 1989, the title of Deputy Prime Minister has been an official one, although the position had been unofficially known by that name since its creation. From the position's creation until 1989, the deputy prime minister went by the title of Vice-President of the Government. This mirrored the prime minister's title, which was President of the Government until 1989. The name Vice Prime Minister is also used.

== List of deputy prime ministers ==
Deputy Prime Minister	Party	Start date	End date	Reason for departure	Prime Minister	Government
Deputy Prime Minister (since 2 March 1959)
Eugène Schaus	DP	2 March 1959	15 July 1964	Coalition partner changed	Pierre Werner	Werner-Schaus I
Henry Cravatte	LSAP	15 July 1964	6 February 1969	Coalition partner changed	Pierre Werner	Werner-Cravatte
Eugène Schaus	DP	6 February 1969	15 June 1974	Government lost election	Pierre Werner	Werner-Schaus II
Raymond Vouel	LSAP	15 June 1974	21 July 1976	Appointed to EC Commission	Gaston Thorn	Thorn
Bernard Berg	LSAP	21 July 1976	16 July 1979	Government lost election	Gaston Thorn	Thorn
Gaston Thorn	DP	16 July 1979	22 November 1980	Appointed EC President	Pierre Werner	Werner-Thorn-Flesch
Colette Flesch	DP	22 November 1980	20 July 1984	Coalition partner changed	Pierre Werner	Werner-Thorn-Flesch
Jacques Poos	LSAP	20 July 1984	26 January 1995	Coalition partner changed	Jacques Santer	Santer-Poos I, II and III
Jacques Poos	LSAP	26 January 1995	7 August 1999	Coalition partner changed	Jean-Claude Juncker	Juncker-Poos
Lydie Polfer	DP	7 August 1999	31 July 2004	Coalition partner changed	Jean-Claude Juncker	Juncker-Polfer
Jean Asselborn	LSAP	31 July 2004	4 December 2013	Resigned	Jean-Claude Juncker	Juncker–Asselborn I and II
Xavier Bettel	DP	17 November 2023	Incumbent		Luc Frieden	Frieden-Bettel Government
First Deputy Prime Minister (4 December 2013 – 17 November 2023)
Etienne Schneider	LSAP	4 December 2013	4 February 2020	Resigned	Xavier Bettel	Bettel I and II
Dan Kersch	LSAP	4 February 2020	5 January 2022	Resigned	Xavier Bettel	Bettel II
Paulette Lenert	LSAP	5 January 2022	17 November 2023	Government lost election	Xavier Bettel	Bettel II
Second Deputy Prime Minister (5 December 2018 – 17 November 2023)
Félix Braz	DG	5 December 2018	11 October 2019	Health	Xavier Bettel	Bettel II
François Bausch	DG	11 October 2019	17 November 2023	Government lost election	Xavier Bettel	Bettel II

== See also ==
- List of prime ministers of Luxembourg
