= Jacques Poos =

Luxembourgish politician (1935–2022)

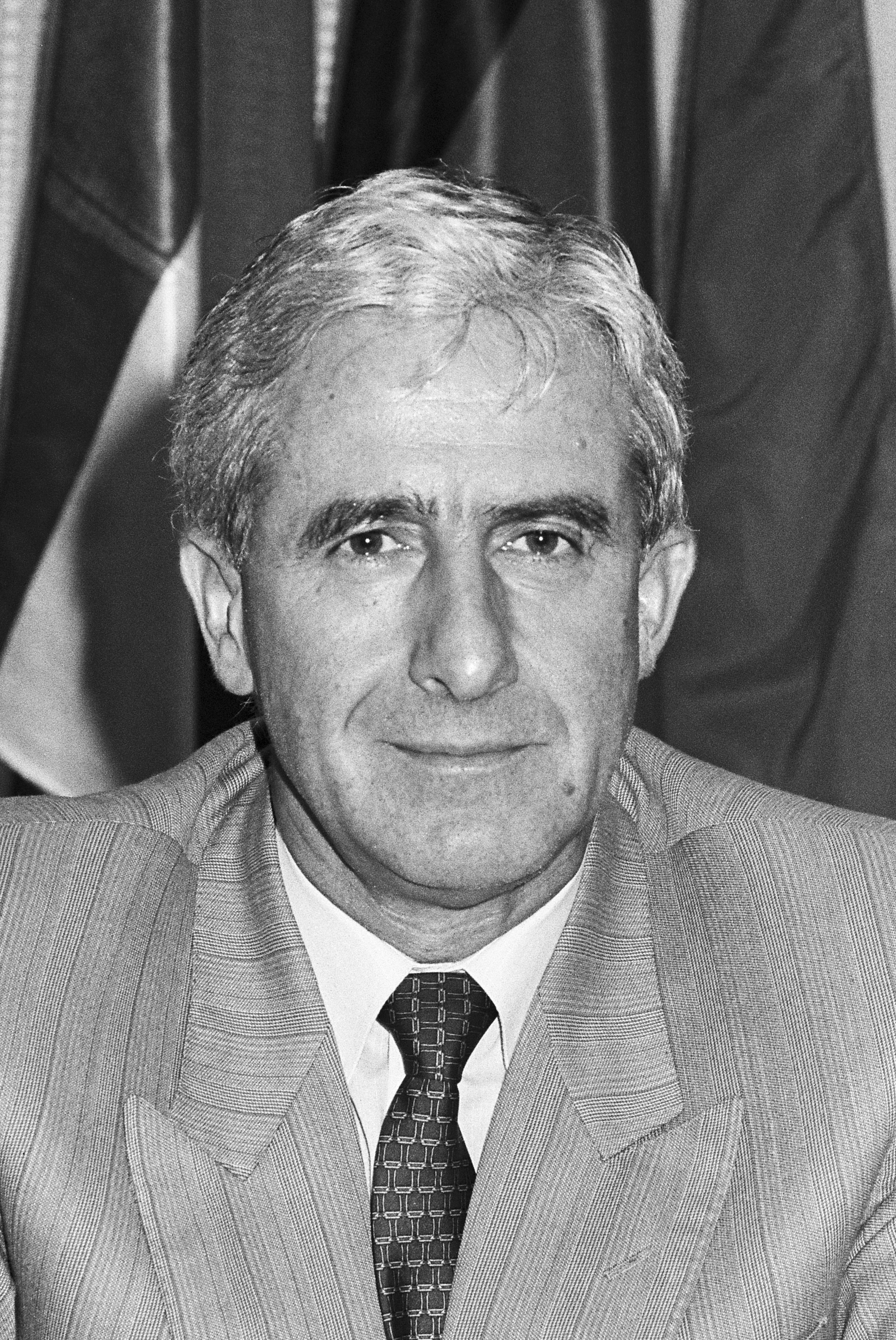
- Poos in 1985

Member of the European Parliament
- In office 20 July 1999 – 5 May 2004
- Constituency: Luxembourg

Deputy Prime Minister of Luxembourg Minister for Foreign Affairs
- In office 20 July 1984 – 7 August 1999
- Prime Minister: Jacques Santer; Jean-Claude Juncker
- Preceded by: Colette Flesch
- Succeeded by: Lydie Polfer

Minister for Finances
- In office 21 July 1976 – 16 July 1979
- Prime Minister: Gaston Thorn
- Preceded by: Raymond Vouel
- Succeeded by: Jacques Santer

Personal details
- Born: Jacques François Poos; 3 June 1935 Luxembourg
- Died: 19 February 2022 (aged 86)
- Party: Luxembourg Socialist Workers' Party
- Other political affiliations: Party of European Socialists
- Education: University of Lausanne

Jacques François Poos (3 June 1935 – 19 February 2022) was a Luxembourgish politician from the Luxembourg Socialist Workers' Party (LSAP).

== Early life and education ==
Born in 1935, in Luxembourg, Poos was a trained economist and became a doctor of economics in 1961, when he graduated from the University of Lausanne.

== Career in politics ==
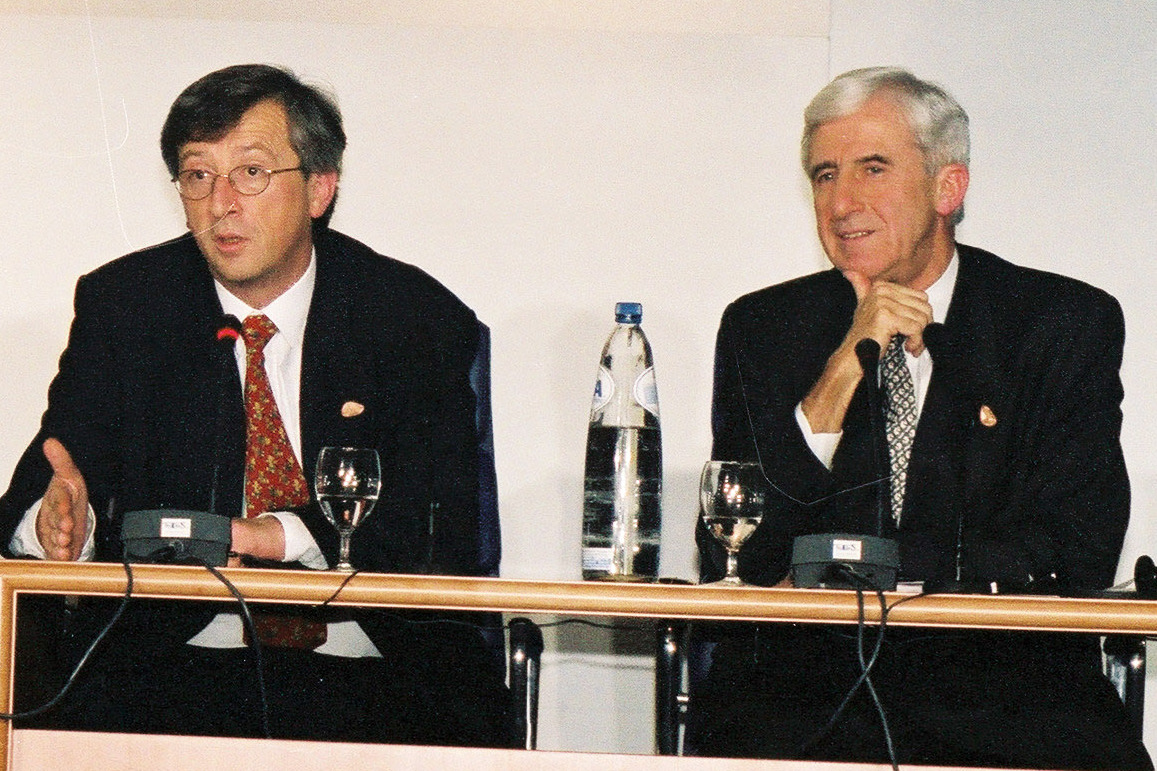
Poos and Jean-Claude Juncker in 1997

Poos was a long-time member of the Luxembourg Socialist Workers' Party. Between 1964 and 1976, he was director and editor in Chief of the daily newspaper Tageblatt in Esch-sur-Alzette. In the same period he also became a member of the town council of Esch-sur-Alzette.

In July 1976, he was appointed Minister of Finance. As the foreign minister of Luxembourg he held Presidency of the Council of the European Union for three half-year terms in 1985, 1991 and 1997. He was Deputy Prime Minister and Minister of Foreign Affairs, Foreign Trade and Development, first in Jacques Santer's (from 1984 to 1995), then in Jean-Claude Junckers's cabinets (from 1995 to 1999).

In 1991, he was one of the negotiators of the Brioni Agreement that ended the Ten-Day War in Slovenia. In May of that year, upon disembarking from an airplane en route to beginning negotiations, he declared, "The hour of Europe has dawned."

=== European Parliament ===
In 1999, Poos left the government and was elected as a Member of European Parliament, where he sat on the Committee for Foreign Affairs, Human Rights, Common Security and Defence Policy, and was the draftsman for Cyprus' accession into the EU. In 2003, he received an honorary doctor of law degree from Panteion University of Athens, Greece.

== Retirement and death ==
In 2004, Poos retired from political life, but remained active as non-executive director in the boards of different national and international institutions and companies. He died on 19 February 2022, at the age of 86.

== See also ==
- Santer-Poos Ministry I
- Santer-Poos Ministry II
- Santer-Poos Ministry III
- Juncker-Poos Ministry (1995-1999)

Political offices
Preceded by Raymond Vouel	Minister for Finances; 1976–1979	Succeeded by Jacques Santer
Preceded by Colette Flesch	Deputy Prime Minister; 1984–1999	Succeeded by Lydie Polfer
Preceded by Colette Flesch	Minister for Foreign Affairs; 1984–1999	Succeeded by Lydie Polfer
Preceded by Colette Flesch	Minister for the Economy; 1984–1989	Succeeded by Robert Goebbels
Preceded by Marc Fischbach	Minister for Defence; 1989–1994	Succeeded by Alex Bodry
Preceded by Marc Fischbach	Minister for the Police Force; 1989–1994	Succeeded by Alex Bodry
