= Greater Region of SaarLorLux =

Euroregion in Western Europe

Greater Region Großregion (German) Grande Région (French) Groussregioun (Luxembourgish)
- Logo

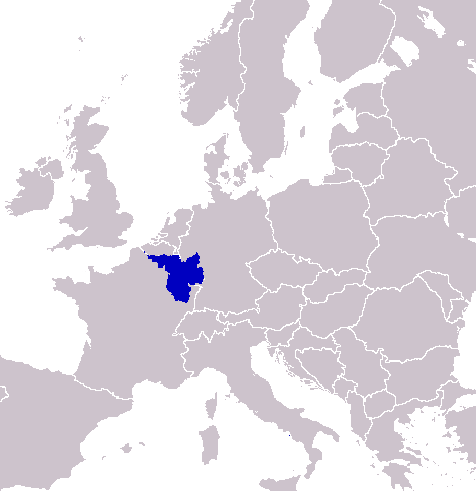
- Location of the Greater Region in Western Europe
- Type: Euroregion
- Membership: Belgium: - Wallonia: -- French Community of Belgium; -- German-speaking Community of Belgium; France: - Grand Est (former Lorraine part:); -- Meurthe-et-Moselle; -- Meuse; -- Moselle; -- Vosges; Germany: - Rhineland-Palatinate; - Saarland; Luxembourg
- Establishment: 16 October 1980

Area
  - Total: 65,400 km^{2} (25,300 sq mi)

Population
  - 2019 estimate: 11,639,225
  - Density: 173/km^{2} (448.1/sq mi)
- Currency: Euro (EUR)
- Time zone: UTC+01:00 (CET)
- Website granderegion.net/en

The Greater Region (German: Großregion [ˈɡʁoːsʁeˌɡioːn]; French: Grande Région [ɡʁɑ̃d ʁeʒjɔ̃]; Luxembourgish: Groussregioun), formerly also known as SaarLorLux, is a euroregion of eleven regional authorities located in four European states. The term has also been applied to cooperations of several of these authorities or of their subdivisions, administrations, organisations, clubs and people. Member regions represent different political structures: Wallonia, comprising the French and German-speaking Communities of Belgium; the former Lorraine part of the French Grand Est region, including the departments Meurthe-et-Moselle, Meuse, Moselle and Vosges; the German federated states of Rhineland-Palatinate and Saarland; and the sovereign state of Luxembourg.

== Member regions ==
=== Shared history ===
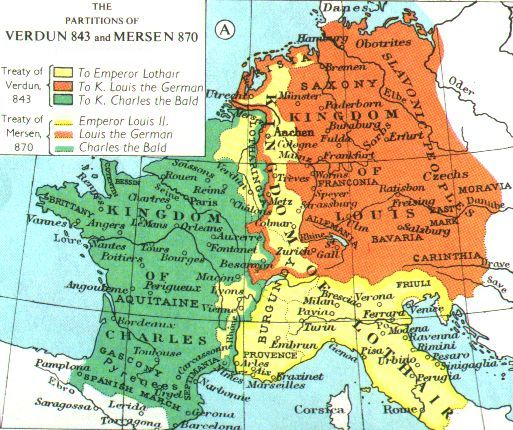
Lotharingia (yellow), as established by the Treaty of Verdun, 843

The Greater Region was settled by the Celtic tribes of the Treveri and Mediomatrici. The Treveri lived in the south of Belgium, Luxembourg, western Rhineland-Palatinate, and northern Saarland. Lorraine and the southern Saarland were inhabited by the Mediomatrici. Both tribes were conquered during the Gallic Wars by the Roman legions of Julius Caesar. The area became part of the Roman provinces of Gallia Belgica, Germania Superior, and Germania Inferior.

Barbarian invasions forced the enfeebled Roman Empire to abandon possession of the area in the fifth century. The region became a part of the Frankish Empire. After the death of Louis the Pious in 840, the Carolingians adhered to the Germanic custom of partible inheritance, and the Treaty of Verdun in 843 divided the empire into three. Louis's eldest surviving son Lothair I became Emperor of the Romans and ruler of Middle Francia. His three sons in turn divided this kingdom between them into Lotharingia, Burgundy and the Kingdom of Italy (which covered the northern part of the Italian peninsula). The core area of the Greater Region lies within the borders of Lotharingia. The struggle to gain control over Lotharingia was the cause of centuries of struggle and war between the two other Franconian kingdoms (West and East Francia), which over time evolved into the Kingdom of France and the Holy Roman Empire (the predecessor of subsequent German states), with the Holy Roman Empire ultimately gaining control until the 18th century.

From 1384, the then Duchy of Luxembourg and part of Wallonia formed part of what was known as the Burgundian Netherlands, which was inherited by the house of Habsburg in 1482, becoming the Habsburg Netherlands. Although still subject to the Holy Roman Emperor, the Habsburg Netherlands were inherited by Habsburg Spain in 1556 and ruled in a personal union until 1714; thereafter it was ruled by the Austrian Habsburg monarchy, the rulers of which were also the Holy Roman Emperors. The remainder of Wallonia formed part of the Prince-Bishopric of Liège, while much of what would become Rhineland-Palatinate was part of the Palatinate, which came under Bavarian control in 1777. Upper Lotharingia evolved into the Duchy of Lorraine while several smaller states came and went over the centuries.

In 1766 the Duchy of Lorraine and most of the surrounding smaller states were annexed by France, leaving the County of Salm and a few exclaves of other HRE states as the only territory within the modern region of Lorraine under Imperial rule. In 1793 Salm was annexed, followed in 1794 by the Southern Netherlands (including Luxembourg and Wallonia). Over the course of the Napoleonic Wars, the remainder of the region west of the Rhine (plus Katzenelnbogen, which lies to the east of the Rhine) was annexed to the newly formed French Empire; the rest of modern Rhineland-Palatinate east of the Rhine became part of the Duchy of Nassau (formed from the merger of Nassau-Usingen and Nassau-Weilburg lands), which was a member of Napoleon's puppet Confederation of the Rhine. The wars also saw an end to the Holy Roman Empire.

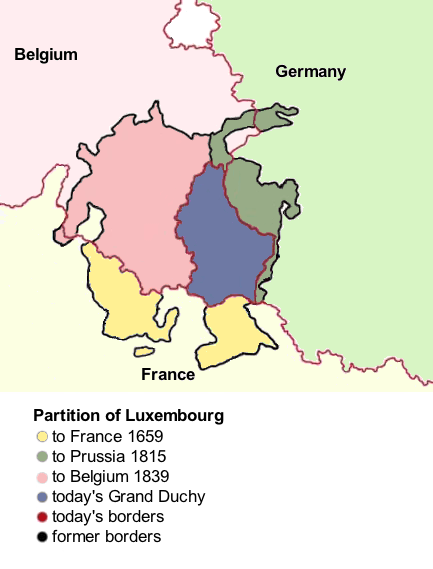
The Partitions of Luxembourg

Following Napoleon's defeat, the Congress of Vienna granted most of the Southern Netherlands, including Wallonia, to the United Kingdom of the Netherlands. Luxembourg was placed in a personal union under the Dutch crown but also made subject to the Holy Roman Empire's successor: the German Confederation. Most of what would become the Saarland and Rhineland-Palatinate was split between the Kingdoms of Bavaria and Prussia (also within the German Confederation); the eastern portion of Luxembourg was also ceded to Prussia. The only other states to remain in the region were part of the Grand Duchy of Hesse (Rhenish Hesse), Hesse-Homburg (which was incorporated into the Grand Duchy of Hesse in 1866), the Principality of Lichtenberg (which was sold to Prussia in 1834), the Grand Duchy of Oldenburg and the Duchy of Nassau (which was annexed by Prussia in 1866). The Lorraine region remained in French hands.

In 1830, as a result of the Belgian Revolution, the Kingdom of Belgium declared independence from the Netherlands and also de facto annexed the French-speaking portion of Luxembourg (around 2/3 of its area at that time). This was later recognised in the Treaty of London (1839).

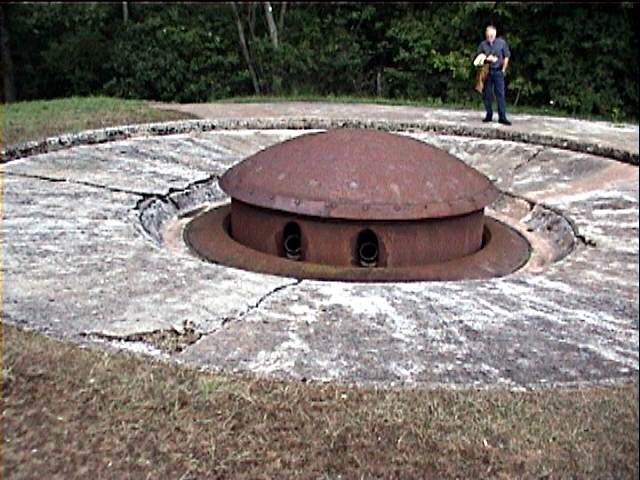
Cannons of the Maginot Line

As a result of these events, the inhabitants of the region were on different sides in the Franco Prussian War of 1870–71, which ultimately led to the founding of the German Empire. The new Empire also annexed of part of Lorraine, as well as neighbouring Alsace, as the Imperial Territory of Alsace-Lorraine. Following World War I, this territory was ceded back to France in the Treaty of Versailles, while the Saargebiet, an area roughly co-extensive with the modern Saarland, was placed under joint British and French control until 1935. Prior to World War II the region was divided by the fortifications of the Maginot Line and the Westwall. After World War II, the Saar Protectorate was established under French control until 1957, when it was reunited with (West) Germany, forming the modern state. A small area of Germany adjoining Rhineland-Palatinate was also ceded to Belgium, which was incorporated into Wallonia as the German-speaking community of Belgium.

Percentage distribution of the Greater Region's population

Today, the greater region is situated along both sides of the border between speakers of the German and French languages. 11,182,975 people live in an area of about 65,400 km^{2}. Situated in the center of the European Union, it contains highly populated urban sections along the rivers. These areas include industries, especially mining and steelworking. Rural areas are dominated by agriculture.

=== Luxembourg ===
Luxembourg is a sovereign nation with full autonomy. Each of the four départements of the French region of Lorraine is twice the size of the whole nation of Luxembourg.

The Grand Duchy of Luxembourg has a population of 672,050 in an area of 2586 square kilometres (998 sq mi).

Luxembourg is a parliamentary representative democracy with a constitutional monarchy, ruled by a Grand Duke. It is the world's only sovereign Grand Duchy. The country has a highly developed economy, with the highest Gross Domestic Product per capita in the world.

The city of Luxembourg, the capital and largest city, is the seat of several institutions and agencies of the European Union. Luxembourg lies on the cultural divide between Romantic Europe and Germanic Europe, borrowing customs from each of the distinct traditions. Luxembourg is a trilingual country; French, German, and Luxembourgish are official languages. Although a secular state, Luxembourg is predominantly Roman Catholic.

Until 1867, the city of Luxembourg, the Gibraltar of the north, was a federal fortress of the German confederation. In the 20th century, Luxembourg was twice occupied by German armies. In the middle of the 20th century, the economy of Luxembourg was dominated by the iron and steel industries. Then, a structural change took place, which transformed the country to an international financial center with more than 200 banks and over 800 financial institutions and insurance companies, generating more than 20% of the GNP of Luxembourg. Today about 66% of workers are employed in the service sector, and less than 2% work in the steel industry.

=== Saarland and Rhineland-Palatinate ===
The German states of Saarland and Rhineland-Palatinate are part of the federal system of Germany. They hold far-ranging authorities, although some decisions concerning international treaties are assigned to the federal government.

==== Saarland ====
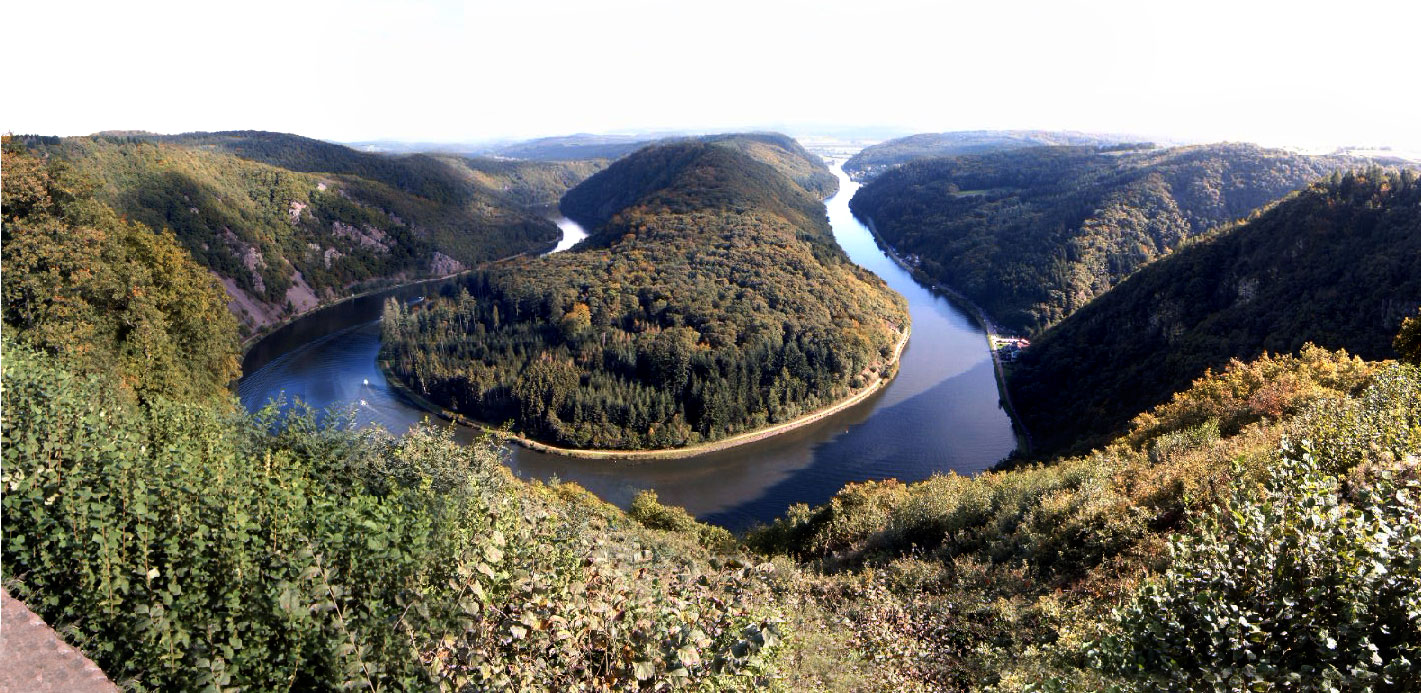
"Saarschleife" (Bend in the Saar) near Mettlach

Saarland is one of the 16 states of Germany. The capital is Saarbrücken. It has an area of 2570 km^{2} and 1.051 million inhabitants. In both area and population it is the smallest of the German Flächenländer ("area states"), i.e., those that are not City States (Berlin, Bremen and Hamburg).

It is named after the Saar River, which is a tributary of the Moselle River (a Rhine tributary) which runs through the state from the south to the northwest. One third of the land area of the Saarland is covered by forest, one of highest percentages in Germany. The state is generally hilly; the highest mountain is the Dollberg with a height of 695.4 metres (2,281 ft).

Most inhabitants live in a city agglomeration on the French border that includes the capital of Saarbrücken.

In 1919, Saarland was created from the communes where the steelworks and coal mines were located and the associated workers lived. From 1920 to 1935 and from 1947 to 1956, Saarland was economically affiliated with France. In 1957, 65,000 persons were employed in 18 coal mines, by 2006 only 6,300 in one mine remained. A comparable process happened with the steelworks.

==== Rhineland-Palatinate ====
Rhineland-Palatinate is one of the 16 Bundesländer (federal states) of Germany. It has an area of 19,846 km^{2} and about 4.048 million inhabitants. The capital is Mainz. The federal state of Rhineland-Palatinate was established on 30 August 1946.

The main axis of the state is the Rhine river that forms the border with Baden-Württemberg and Hesse in the southeast before running across the northern part of Rhineland-Palatinate. The Rhine Valley is bounded by mountain chains and forms a landscape containing some of the most historically significant places in Germany.

The Eifel and Hunsrück mountain chains are found on the west bank of the Rhine in northern Rhineland-Palatinate, while the Westerwald and Taunus mountains are found on the east bank. The hilly land in the southernmost region of the state is called the Palatinate Forest (Pfälzerwald).

These mountain chains are separated from each other by tributaries of the Rhine: the Moselle (Mosel), the Lahn and the Nahe.

Economically prosperous zones exist along the eastern borders, while in the western part of the state, there are structurally backward, rural regions.

=== Lorraine ===
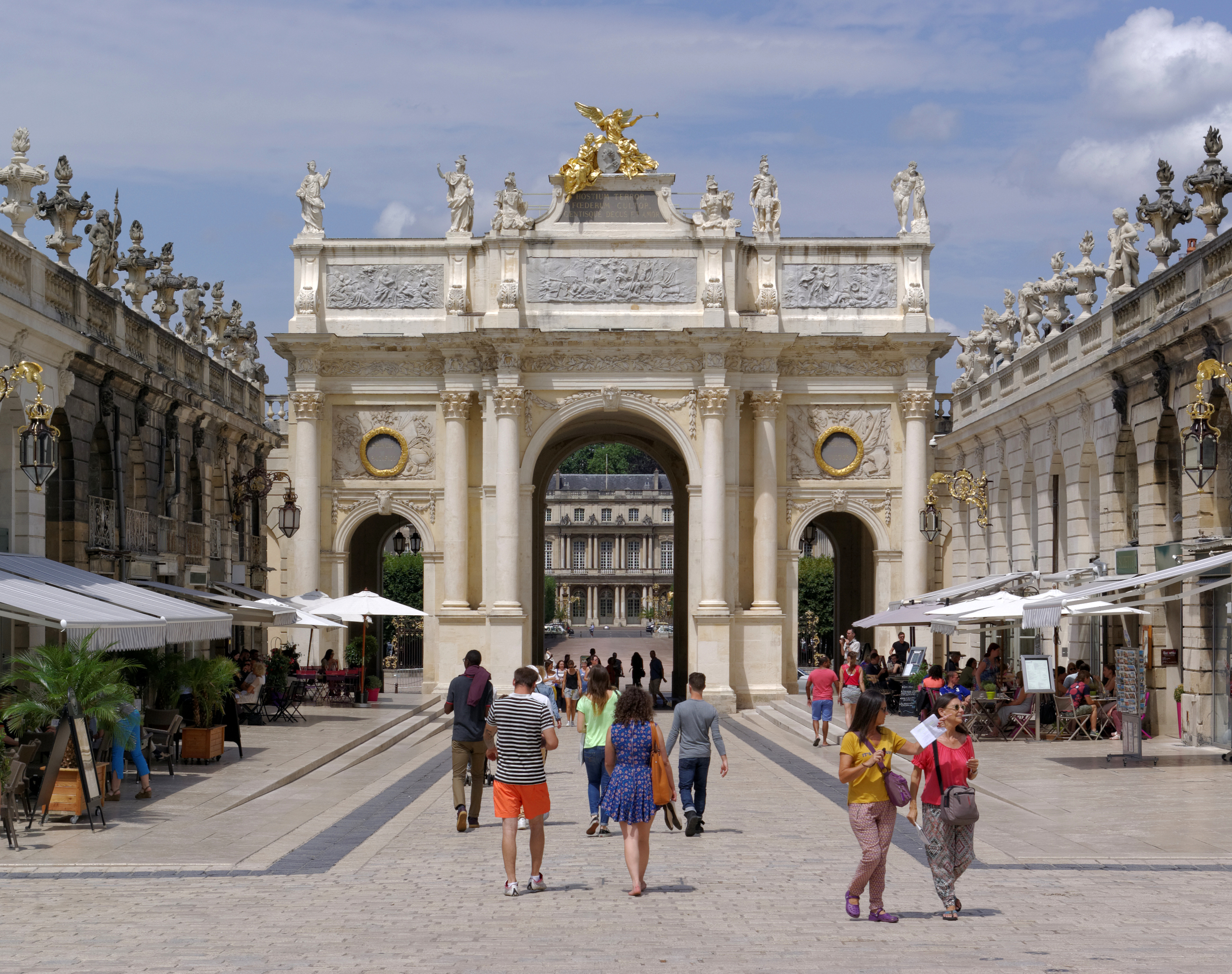
Nancy – Place Stanislas – Arc de triomphe

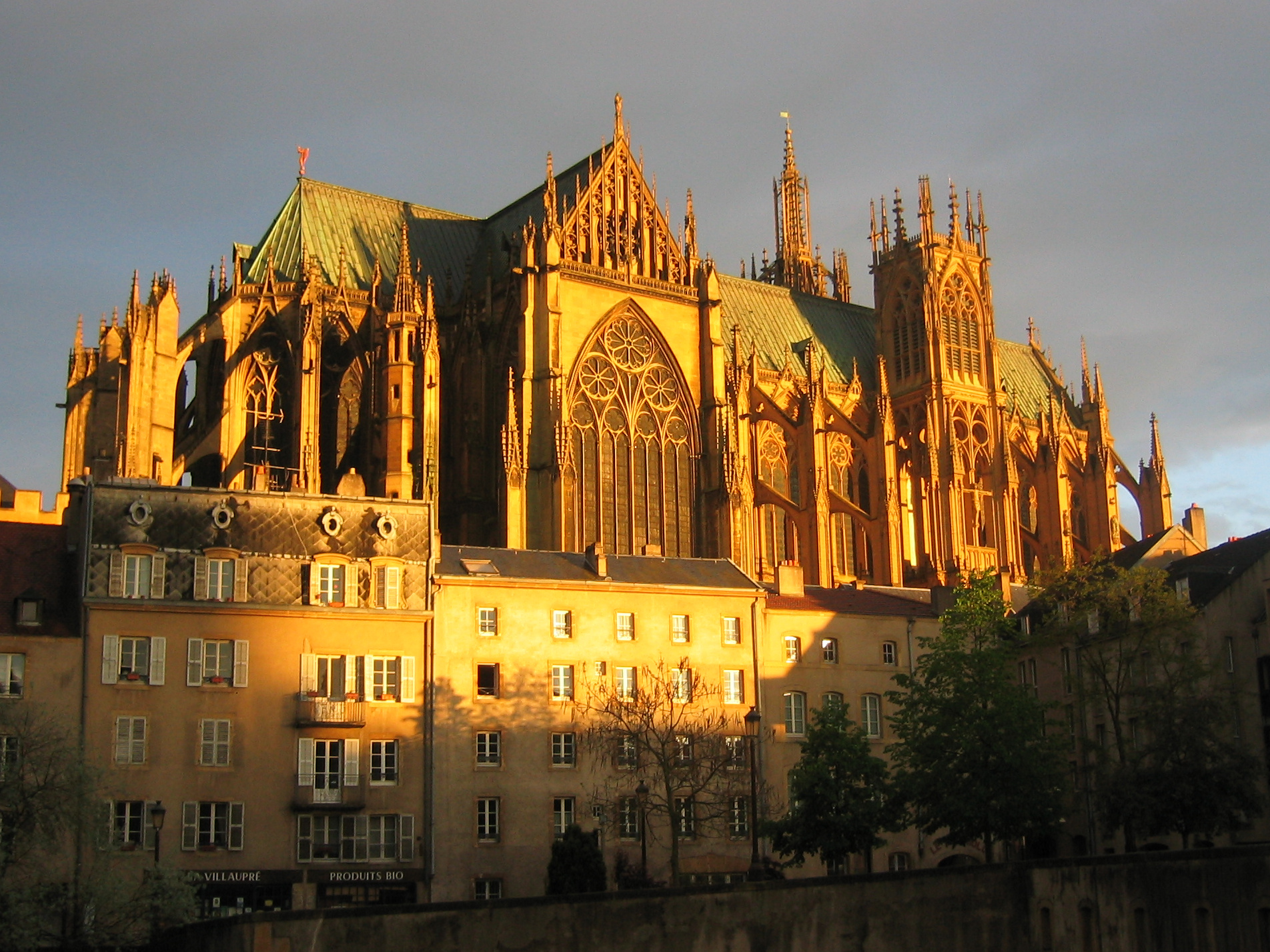
Saint-Stephen cathedral in Metz, capital of Lorraine region.

Until 2016, Lorraine was one of the 26 regions of France. Its two main cities are Metz (administrative capital) and Nancy. The region's name is derived from the medieval Lotharingia.

Lorraine consists of four départements, Moselle, Meurthe et Moselle, Meuse and Vosges. Each of them is as big as Luxembourg and the Saarland together. Two of these départements, Vosges in the south and Meuse in the west, only have small interests in the Greater Region, because they are far away from the shared border. Together, they have a population of about 2.338 million people on 23,547 km^{2}. Lorraine is part of the centralised administrative system of France. Therefore, many of the decisions necessary for cooperation in the Greater Region have to be cleared through the central government in Paris.

The current région of Lorraine is larger than the historical duchy of Lorraine which gradually came under French sovereignty between 1737 and 1766. The modern région includes provinces and areas that were historically separate from the duchy of Lorraine proper. These are:

- Barrois
- Three Bishoprics
- several small principalities which were still part of the Holy Roman Empire at the time of the French Revolution.

Lorraine borders the French regions of Alsace, Champagne-Ardenne and Franche-Comté. The location of Lorraine led to it being seen as a strategic asset. As the crossroads of four nations, it had a very important role in European affairs. Lorraine has many rivers running through it, which include the Rhine, Moselle, Meurthe, and Meuse.

From 1871 to 1918 and during World War II, the Moselle department, then known as Lothringen (German for Lorraine), was part of Germany. During the last 40 years, most jobs in the formerly dominant industries of steelworking, coal mining and textiles were lost.

=== Wallonia ===
Wallonia with its five provinces and two communities has far reaching competencies in relation to economics, infrastructure, regional planning and foreign trade.

Wallonia occupies the southern part of Belgium. It has an area of 16 844 km^{2} (55.18% of Belgium) with 3.436 million inhabitants and comprises the following provinces:

- Hainaut
- Liège
- Luxembourg
- Namur
- Walloon Brabant

French is the official language in most municipalities. German (with facilities for speakers of French) is the official language in nine eastern municipalities which belonged to Germany until 1918 and now form the German-speaking Community of Belgium. Several French-speaking municipalities have facilities in Dutch or German (or both). In a survey conducted by the Universite Catholique de Louvain in Louvain-La-Neuve and published in June 2006, only 19% of Walloons stated that they were able to speak Dutch. In contrast, 59% of respondents from the Flemish Community claimed to speak French. During the seventies the number of jobs in coal mines and steelworks was reduced from 135,000 to 35,000 today. Therefore, the region partially depends upon federal subsidies, including from Flanders, Belgium's most inhabited region. Steelwork is today still important in the region.

== Development of cooperation ==
=== The beginnings: SaarLorLux ===
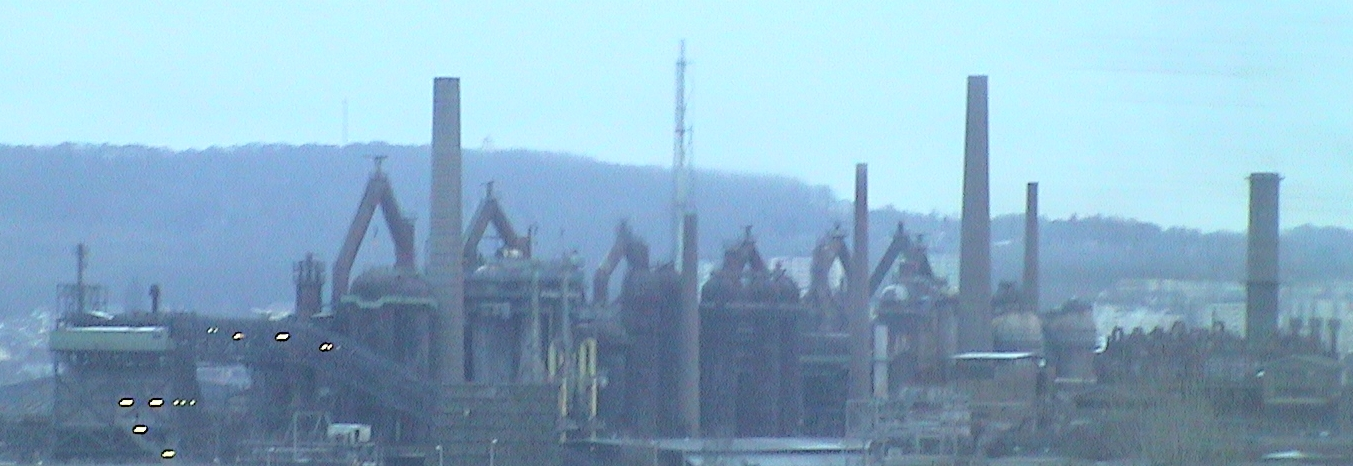
The former steelworks of Völklingen, now world cultural heritage site, is a symbol of the changed economy of the region.

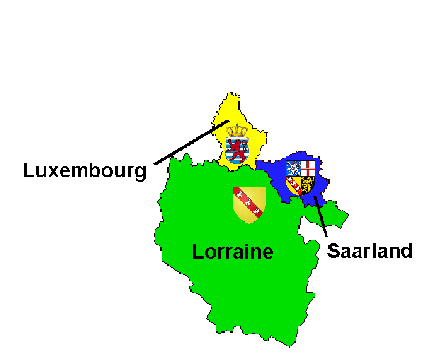
The founding members of SaarLorLux

The Greater Region was founded under the name SaarLorLux, taking its initial name from its founding members: the German federated state Saarland, the French region of Lorraine, and the Grand Duchy of Luxembourg. The founding members spread over an area of 36,700 km^{2} and have about 4.7 million inhabitants.

The term Saar-Lor-Lux was coined in 1969 by Dr. Hubertus Rolshoven, founding president or the IRI (Institut Régional Intracommunautaire, now Institute of the Greater Region) and president of Saarberg, the former organisation of coal mines in the Saarland. The term recalls the close historical and economic ties among the coal mines and steelworks of Saarland, Lorraine and Luxembourg, creating a unified economic region. Facing the same severe economic problems of a crisis in the steel and coal industries, the partners began informal talks, discussing how to solve the shared problems and how to improve the region. In the 1970s, these talks began to be more formalised, when official governmental commissions, first between France and Germany only, then including Luxembourg, began their work.

The formal founding act of SaarLorLux was an agreement between the governments of the French Republic, the Federal Republic of Germany and the Grand Duchy of Luxembourg concerning collaboration in the border regions, made on 16 October 1980. This agreement is the legal base of a boundary-crossing cooperation of administrations and institutions to promote the economic, cultural, touristic and social development of the region.

=== Enlargement of the region ===
==== Treaties and Agreements ====
| 1970 | Formation of the German-French governmental commission |
| 1971 | Luxembourg joins the governmental commission |
| | Decision of the Formation of the Regional Commission Saarland – Lorraine – Luxemburg – Rhineland Palatinate |
| 1980 | Agreement among the governments of the Republique Francaise, the Bundesrepublik Deutschland and the Grand-Duché de Luxembourg concerning collaboration in the border regions |
| 1986 | Formation of the Interregional Parliamentary Council (IPR) |
| 1988 | First meeting of the joint Council of Ministers of Saarland and Lorraine |
| 1992 | First implementation of the Interreg Projects (A) |
| 1995 | First Summit of SaarLorLux at Bad Mondorf (Luxembourg) |
| 1999 | Creation of the house of the greater region at the city of Luxembourg. |
| 2000 | First award of the prize of the greater region for special interregional performance |
| 2003 | Vision for the future 2020 |
| 2005 | Wallonia joins the Regional Commission |

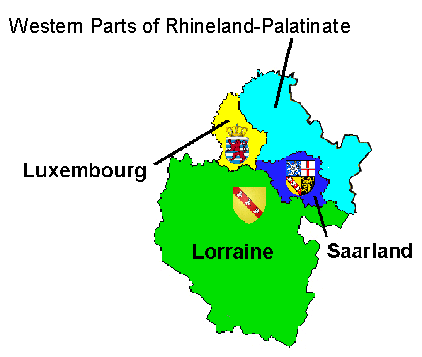

Step by step, the cooperation originally exclusive to Saarland, Lorraine and Luxembourg was developed to include the Greater Region of Saarland, Lorraine, Luxembourg, Wallonia and the French-speaking Belgians, the German-speaking Belgians and the German state of Rhineland Palatinate. There was no formal process of enlargement that included new regions in all aspects of cooperation in SaarLorLux. The new members did not enter every instrument of collaboration; they only joined single treaties or aspects of cooperation.

Therefore, there is not one all embracing structure any more. Now, there are different bilateral and multilateral treaties among different members, creating different grades of cooperation without clear separation from each other.

== Organization ==
The Greater Region sees a large amount of governmental, non-governmental and mixed cooperation. The cooperation is not just between five partners. In fact, the cooperation consists of a multitude of single cooperations, treaties and organisations. The single cooperations often do not consist of the same members, because some of the regions do not participate in every cooperation or are represented by different political municipalities. These forms of cooperation have led to the creation of a variety of different organisations.

=== Governmental cooperation ===
==== Summit Conferences ====
Based on a 1994 decision, there are regular summit conferences.

The participants are:

- Prime Minister of Luxembourg
- Minister-President of the Saarland
- Minister-President of Rhineland-Palatinate
- Minister-President of Wallonia
- Minister-President of the French Community
- Minister-President of the German-speaking Community
- Prefect of Grand Est
- President of the regional council of Grand Est
- President of the general council of Meuse
- President of the general council of Meurthe-et-Moselle
- President of the general council of Moselle

This summit conference is the central political organ of the interregional cooperation of the Greater Region.

Its task is the predefinition and declaration of general political decisions. The conference takes care of problems and questions concerning the cooperation and gives suggestions on solutions and developments. There is a group of delegates of the member states who form a standing committee, able to come to decisions in times between the conferences, to prepare conferences, to translate the general ideas of the conferences into practical work and to control the task groups appointed by the conference.

==== The Regional Commission ====
The Regional Commission is the forum for a variety of topics. The members are:

- Lorraine
- Luxembourg
- Saarland
- (the western parts of) Rhineland-Palatinate
- Wallonia (formerly as an observer until 2005)

Each of the five members sends a delegation, led by a head of delegation and supported by a delegation secretary. Within the French delegation there is a high representation of the central state, because many of the subjects of the commission are topics within the responsibility of the central state.

The Regional Commission meets once a year in a formal session with prepared documents and resolutions. The sessions are presided by a chairman from one of the member states. Every year a different state provides the chairman. Each delegation consists of five or ten members. In addition to the formal session the heads of delegation have informal meetings, prepared by the delegation secretaries.

The Regional Commission does not have employees or funds of its own. Necessary expenses are directly paid by the members. The delegation providing the chairman also provides the necessary workforce.

There are working parties, which form the operational part of the Regional Commission, reporting on a regular basis to the Regional Commission. Their topics are economic affairs; road links, transport and communications; environment; social affairs; culture; higher education; regional planning; tourism; security and prevention; education; and regional planning.

The regional commission formed a working group of the statistics agencies and a working group of the land surveying office.

==== Interregional Parliamentary Council ====
The presidents of
the Luxembourg Chamber of Deputies,
the Saar Landtag,
the Rhineland-Palatinate Landtag,
the Lorraine Regional Council
the Provincial Council of the (Belgian) Province of Luxembourg (later replaced by the Parliament of Wallonia)
formed the interregional parliamentary council.

This council promotes the economic, social and cultural role of the Saar-Lor-Lux Greater Region and tries to develop a perspective for crossborder cooperation.

Participants are the five presidents and six appointed members of each the parliaments and assemblies within the Greater Region. They meet once a year. Five standing committees report to the council:

- the committee on economic affairs
- the committee on social affairs
- the committee on transport and communications
- the committee on the environment and agriculture
- the committee on education, training, research and culture

=== Administrative cooperation ===
==== The University Charter ====
In October 1984 seven establishments in Saar-Lor-Lux signed a university cooperation agreement (the Charter) at Pont-à-Mousson. This was the first step towards crossborder cooperation in research and education.

Members of the Charter are:

- Belgium/Wallonia (Province of Luxembourg): Luxembourg University Foundation (Arlon)
- Germany (Western Palatinate and Saarland): Rhineland-Palatinate University Institute: ( Idar-Oberstein, Kaiserslautern and Trier), Saarland University (Saarbrücken and Homburg), University of Applied Sciences Saarland (Saarbrücken)
- France (Lorraine region): Metz University, Metz National School of Engineering (ENIM), Nancy University I and II, Lorraine Polytechnic Institute (Nancy (INPL)
- Luxembourg : University center of Luxembourg

These universities encourage relations between the parties to the Charter, promote teacher, scientist and student exchanges, develop inter-regional study programmes leading to common degrees, and establish common research structures. They foster cooperation on law, French and German literature, geography, environmental science, computer science, materials science, history, culture and sports.

==== European cultural capital 2007 ====
Luxemburg and the SaarLorLux region were the European cultural capital 2007. The year saw a combined cultural program, sharing the motto "Crossing borders together". The programme was intended to reflect the creativity, the energy and the common future of this European region.

==== The House of the Greater Region ====
In November 1999 the House of the Greater Region (Haus der Großregion – Maison de la Grande Région) was opened in Luxembourg. It is a place of communication and contact for the citizens of the region, especially all the participants and organisations of the greater region. The house is a public demonstration of the existence of the greater region and therefore provides representation and identification within the interregional cooperation of the greater region. The house is a place to work on projects of the summit of the greater region and the regional commission.

There is a multilingual hotline connected to the house to give information to interested citizens and to answer questions. The hotline can be used free of charge from anywhere in the greater region.

=== Private cooperations ===
There are many more forms of cooperation between organisations and persons of the member regions, ranging from a cooperation of the Christian parties or the SaarLorLux Chambers of Industry and Commerce, and the SaarLorLux orchestra, to the SaarLorLux rallye and the SaarLorLux Biker community.

Most of these forms of private cooperation are working on a binational or trinational level, including only parts of the region or including groups or organisations outside the region.

== The Greater Region and the European Union ==
All members of the Greater Region are also members of the European Community. The Greater Region is the central area of this community. Luxembourg, one of the three towns which house central institutions of the European Community (the court of justice of the European Communities) is situated in the center of the Greater Region while the other two (Brussels and Strasbourg) are situated just some miles across the borders, close to the Greater Region.

In terms of the European Union, the Greater Region is defined as a European Border Region (short form: Euroregion or Euregio), which means a single European transboundary region that is an "amalgamation of regional and local authorities from both sides of the national border, sometimes with a parliamentary assembly" with "cross-border organisations with a permanent secretariat and experts and administrative staff", basing on national foundations or international treaties, and a Greater Region (also macroregion), a territory that consists of multiple regions or subareas within different states of the European Union.

=== Council of European Municipalities and Regions ===
Because of its character as a recognised European Border Region, the Greater Region is a member of the council of regions, an assembly of representation meant to give local and regional authorities the opportunity to express their needs, problems and wishes to the European union.

=== Interreg ===
Interreg is a programme of the European Union designed to stimulate cooperation between member states on different levels, especially to diminish the influence of national borders to attain equal economic, social and cultural development of the whole European Union. The Greater Region is a beneficiary of several Interreg projects.

The region currently receives funding for projects of Interreg III A, while applications are filed for Interreg IV A projects, which run until 2013.

== Problems of cooperation ==
The members have different forms of organisation and structure and varying levels of decision-making power. The partners face different problems, although they all share problems resulting from the changing economic structure of the region. In all parts of the Greater Region, coal mines and steelworks are closed or will be closed. While facing the same problem, member states did not create a shared solution, but reacted independently. While Luxembourg was very successful in recreating its economy by changing the structure to secondary industries, especially the banking sector, and Lorraine has tried to take a similar line, the German states and Wallonia tried to preserve their old industries, but failed.

This lack of cooperation is not based on a lack of will. In some instances, there is no political power to make the decision to co-operate. The only partner with complete power is Luxembourg, represented by its prime minister. All other members that share the summit table have only limited power. For decisions, they have to consult their central or federal governments in Brussels, Paris and Berlin. Many of the decisions of the Summit are nothing but a declaration of the goodwill of the participants.

Administrative structures vary among the different countries represented in the Greater Region. French villages may only have a hundred inhabitants and a constant need to clear decisions with a higher level of government. German community associations of several districts with thousands of inhabitants have constitutional rights of self-government.

The members of the Greater Region face the same problems. The economy of all members was founded on coal mining and steelworks. Now, they are all trying to perform the same structural change. Because the economic structures resemble each other so closely, there is little possibility for differentiation of fields of activity to complement one another. With the exception of Luxembourg, the citizens of the Greater Region do not speak the other languages of the region. The main foreign language spoken is English. About 120,000 people cross the borders to work in another country. 90,000 of these work in Luxembourg. This is the result of an enormous difference in living standards. These differences in wealth complicate the search for solutions to shared problems. Many citizens of the regions are not aware of the Greater Region. For a citizen of the town of Tournai, in the west of Wallonia, the nearest neighbouring region of SaarLorLux is about two hundred kilometres away. For him, the nearest European neighbour is the French region of Nord-Pas-de-Calais, five kilometres away.The same situation exists for the region of Mainz in the east of Rhineland Palatinate, which is part of the Rhein Main area and the southern départements of Lorraine. The region seems to be too big to form a common identity for all.

== The future of the Greater Region ==
=== Political plans ===
The current political plans for the future of the Greater Region are displayed in Zukunftsbild 2020 (Future Picture 2020), a concept of development showing the visions and ambitions of the Greater Region. It was developed by the commission, led by Jacques Santer, the former president of the European Commission and former prime minister of Luxembourg.

A central intention is the bilingualism of the region. While for about one hundred years, especially in France, the extinction of everything but the national language was the intention of the state, now the value of bilingualism is understood. French and German are intended to be common languages on equal footing within the whole region, including common media for the interregional audience. This co-ordinates with the plan to create cross border schools, giving students the opportunity to gain access to jobs within the European Community and international enterprises. There are intentions for interlinked higher education, research, and innovation, with statements of marks, examinations and diplomas bearing the seal of the Greater Region. The Charter of Academic Cooperation is an attempt to combine the higher education establishments of the Region. A university of the region shall be founded.

The politicians also hope to form a single employment market within the common economic area resulting in a multinational workforce and a transfer of knowledge. Part of the plan calls for the provision of uniform social welfare standards over the whole territory with new kinds of social networks encompassing all members of society. A cross-border Academy for the Social Professions is visualised, providing the social institutions with first class staff. A Centre for Social Information, still to be created, shall inform the public about the provisions and social institutions in the Greater Region.

Great hopes are taken from the good geostrategic position of the region at the center of European infrastructure, combined with the area's great potential for absorbing increasing trans-European traffic, making the region a traffic hub for all modes of transport. The new high-speed east–west railway link, which was opened in 2007, is seen as a first step. Public transport shall be linked to cross-border transport for travellers.

In 2020 the region shall be an area with a homogeneous population possessing solid infrastructure and many interregional networks and urban agglomerations. Therefore, national spatial planning policies have to be abandoned to enable networks of cross border services. An Interregional Council (CI) is planned as a central political organ of the Greater Region. Another task of the CI is the coordination of central missions at the interregional level. Permanent staff of the Council shall be a secretariat, assisted by five agencies, to develop and realise all central projects. The eight summit delegates agreed that the areas of multilingualism and culture, science and research, tourist marketing, the economy and employment, and transport should be studied.

The delegates agreed on the construction of a timetable to realise the Zukunftsbild 2020 platform.

Zukunftsbild 2020 is already included in interregional programmes of development. It is part of Interreg III-A-Programme eBIRD. It is an object of reference within the research project "Blueprints for regional foresight" of the Research Directorate General of the European Commission.

=== Actual progress ===
Although politics create promising programs, actual progress is limited. The main advance so far has been the creation of bilingual schools.

==== Byproducts of European unity ====
The most important developments for the people of the Greater Region have been the launch of the Euro and the signing of the Schengen Agreement.

The launch of the Euro gave the citizens of the border region the possibility to trade across the border without the need for advanced arithmetic operations to calculate the price, when one German mark was about three French francs and about twenty Luxembourgian francs or Belgian francs. The Euro negates the need for the Greater Region to have currency of its own.

The Schengen agreement brought the removal of border posts and border checks. Today, for citizens of the European Union the neighbouring village across the border can be reached the same way as a village in one's own country. Although this agreement was signed on a river boat on the river Moselle near Schengen, at the border triangle of Lorraine, Luxembourg and Saarland, it was not created especially for the use of the region, but the whole of the founding members: the Benelux Economic Union, the Federal Republic of Germany, the French Republic, and now 28 European States.

==== Private initiatives ====
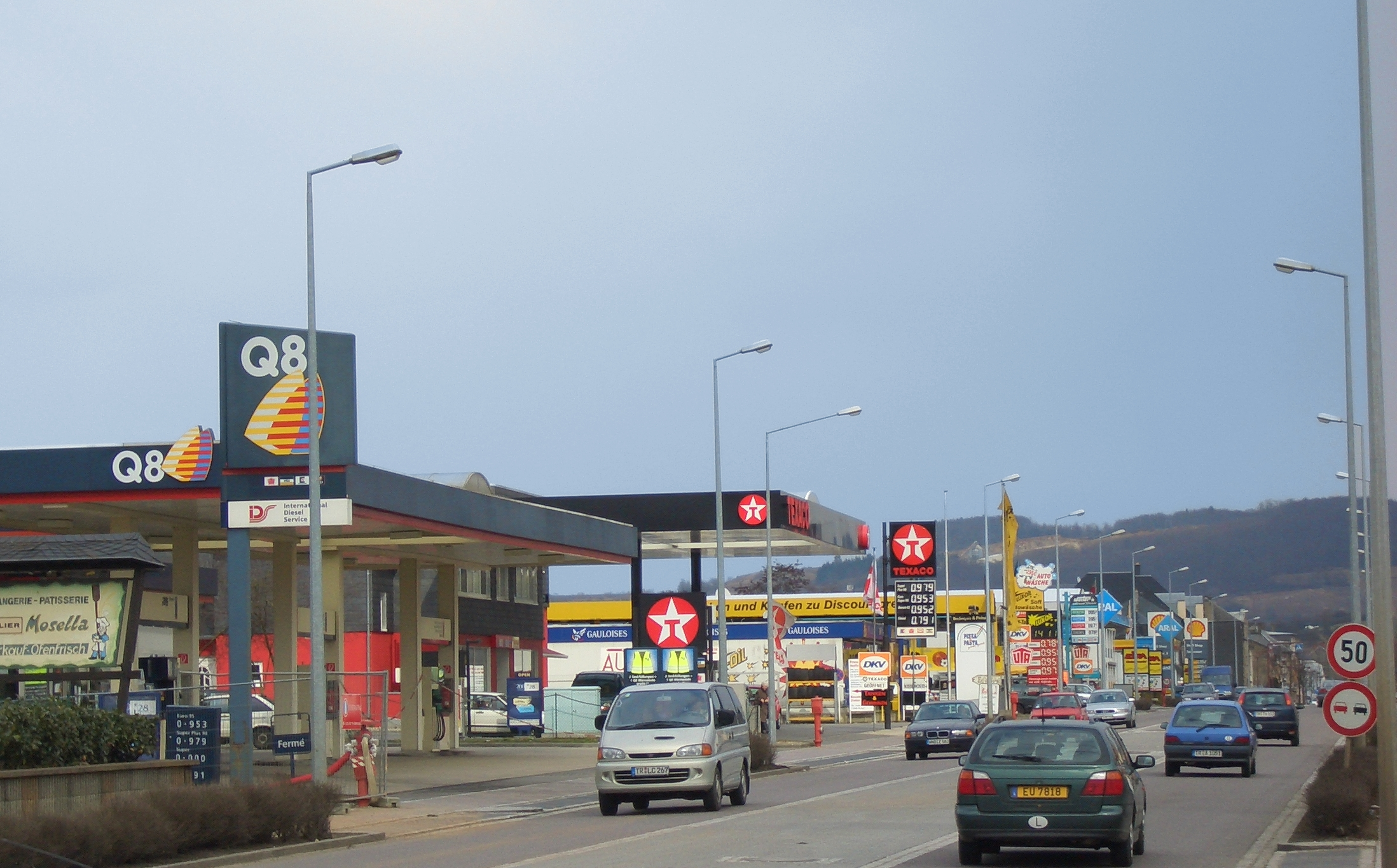
Gas stations in Wasserbillig

The other possibility for advancement is on an informal level. People are beginning to understand their position along the border as an opportunity. The French go shopping in Saarland because the prices are lower. The Germans cherish French shops for the freshness of the food and the wider range of products. Near the border crossings of Luxembourg, the streets are lined with gas stations.

People are relocating to villages on the other side of the border, where houses are cheaper or taxes lower, although there still is not much willingness to become part of the other society. Mayors of villages along the border of southern Saarland and Lorraine report serious problems with Germans who are living there but wish their children to be exempted from French compulsory education, because they do not speak French and want their children to be educated by a German school on the other side of the border. German villages face the same problem with students from Luxembourg.

The future of the Greater Region will be the sum of many such single projects and cooperations, made by single persons, groups and villages, in addition to the political paths.

== Demography ==
On 1 January 2008, the Greater Region of Luxembourg had 11,359,815 inhabitants distributed very unevenly among its five subregions. More than half of the population lived in Rhineland-Palatinate and Wallonia. Only 4.26% of the total population lived in Luxembourg, the smallest subregion.

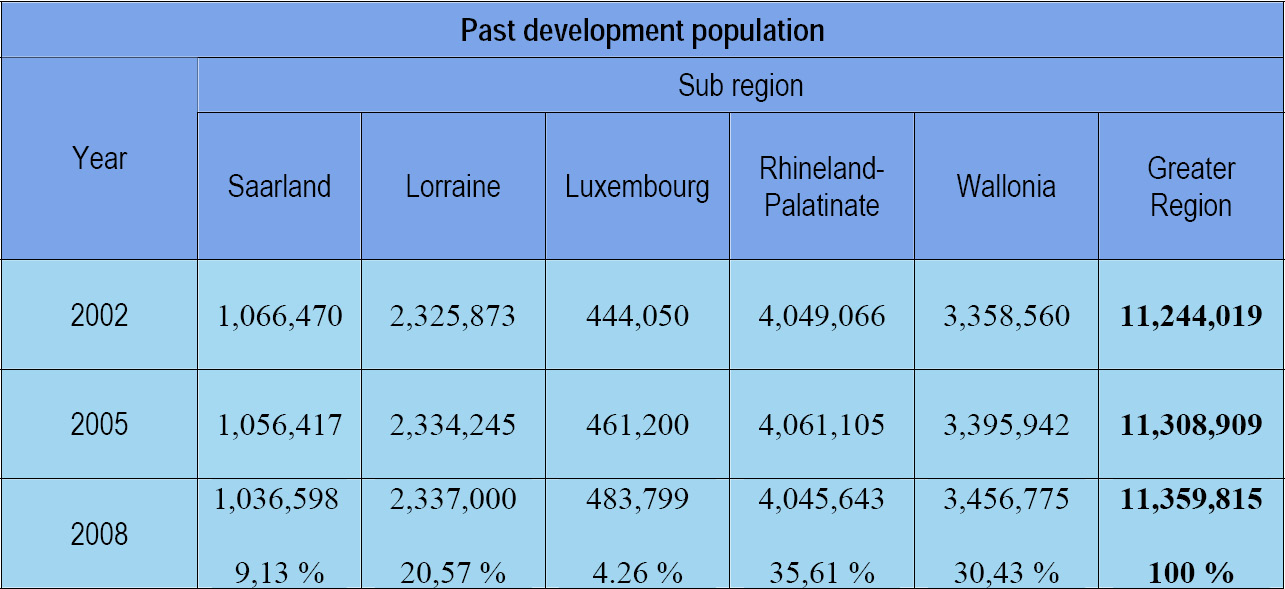
Past development population Greater Region of Luxembourg

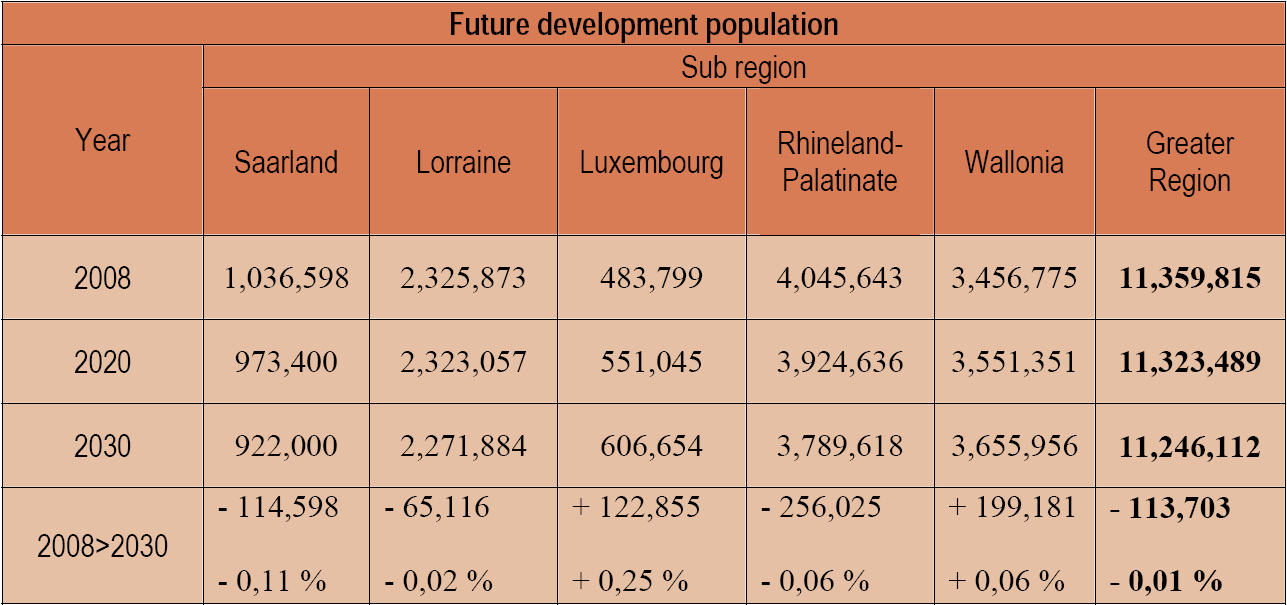
Future development population Greater Region of Luxembourg

A very slight decrease of the total population of the Greater Region is forecast for 2030. However, there are important differences in the projected evolution of the populations of the various subregions. For example, Luxembourg will experience an increase of 0.25%, while a decrease of 0.11% is predicted for the German state of Saarland.

== Economy ==
Cross-border fluxes Greater Region of Luxembourg 2002

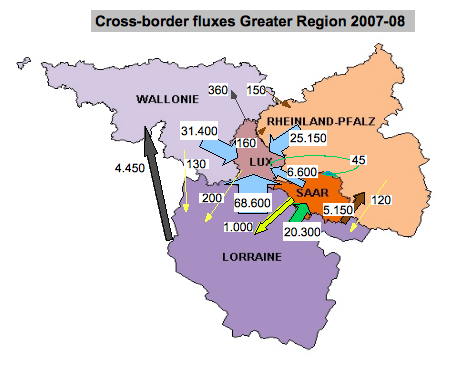
Cross-border fluxes Greater Region of Luxembourg 2007–08

The Greater Region of Luxembourg is characterized by a very high number of daily commuters: in 2007–08 there were 164,000 altogether, of whom 132,000 worked in Luxembourg. Common economic problems arising from drastic changes in the industrial and coal mining areas of the four countries have led to the creation of a community of interest and to the development of common projects like the European Development Pole in the cross-border area of Longwy in France, Rodange in Luxembourg and Athus in Belgium.

The European center situated between the rivers Saar, Moselle and Meuse presents the highest number and density of cross-border commuters in the European Union. More than half of them come from Lorraine and almost three-quarters (73.4%) work in Luxembourg. Luxembourg and the Saarland both have a net in-flow of cross-border commuters. However, that of Luxembourg is constantly high, while that of the Saarland is continuously diminishing. The other subregions have more out-commuters than in-commuters. Lorraine provides the highest number of workers for the neighbouring regions (89,478 as of 2009).

== Culture ==
In 2007 Luxembourg and the Greater Region, together with city of Sibiu, Romania, were designated by the European Union for a period of one year to be the European Capital of Culture, during which they were given a chance to showcase their cultural life and cultural development.

For their focal themes, the subregions selected:

- Luxemburg: Migration;
- Rhineland-Palatinate: Important European personalities;
- Saarland: Industry as cultural heritage;
- Lorraine: Culture and memorization;
- Wallonia: Modern forms of expression.

The Espace culturel Grande Région (Cultural Space Greater Region) association was created in 2007 while the Greater Region was a European Capital of Culture. This association is a project cofinanced by the European Regional Development Funds, within the framework of the INTERREG IV A program Grande Région. Its goals are the pursuit and conservation of cross-border cultural cooperation. The main activities of the association are to bring cultural authorities of the Greater Region together and to define a common work program. This work program of the Espace culturel Grande Région has the following key themes:

- to reflect on the strategies of cultural policy in the Greater Region;
- to develop and conduct cross-border cultural projects;
- to develop professional skills networks;
- to encourage mobility in the Greater Region;
- to build bridges linking culture to education and other fields.

The partners of the Espace culturel Grande Région are:

- In Lorraine:
  - Directorate General of the departments Moselle, Meuse and Meurthe-et-Moselle;
  - Regional Directorate of Cultural Affairs of Lorraine;
  - Region Lorraine;
- In Luxembourg:
  - Ministry of Culture of the Grand Duchy of Luxembourg;
  - City of Luxembourg;
- in Rhineland-Palatinate:
  - Ministry of Education, Science, Youth and Culture of Rhineland-Palatinate;
  - City of Trier;
- In Saarland
  - Ministry of Culture of the Saarland;
- In Wallonia
  - Ministry of the French Community of Belgium;
  - Ministry of the German Speaking Community of Belgium.

In the Greater Region more than 1,200 museums and other institutions present and conserve the heritage of this core European region.
