= Santer-Poos I Government =

Government of Luxembourg from 1984 to 1989

- Cabinet of Luxembourg
- 1984-1989
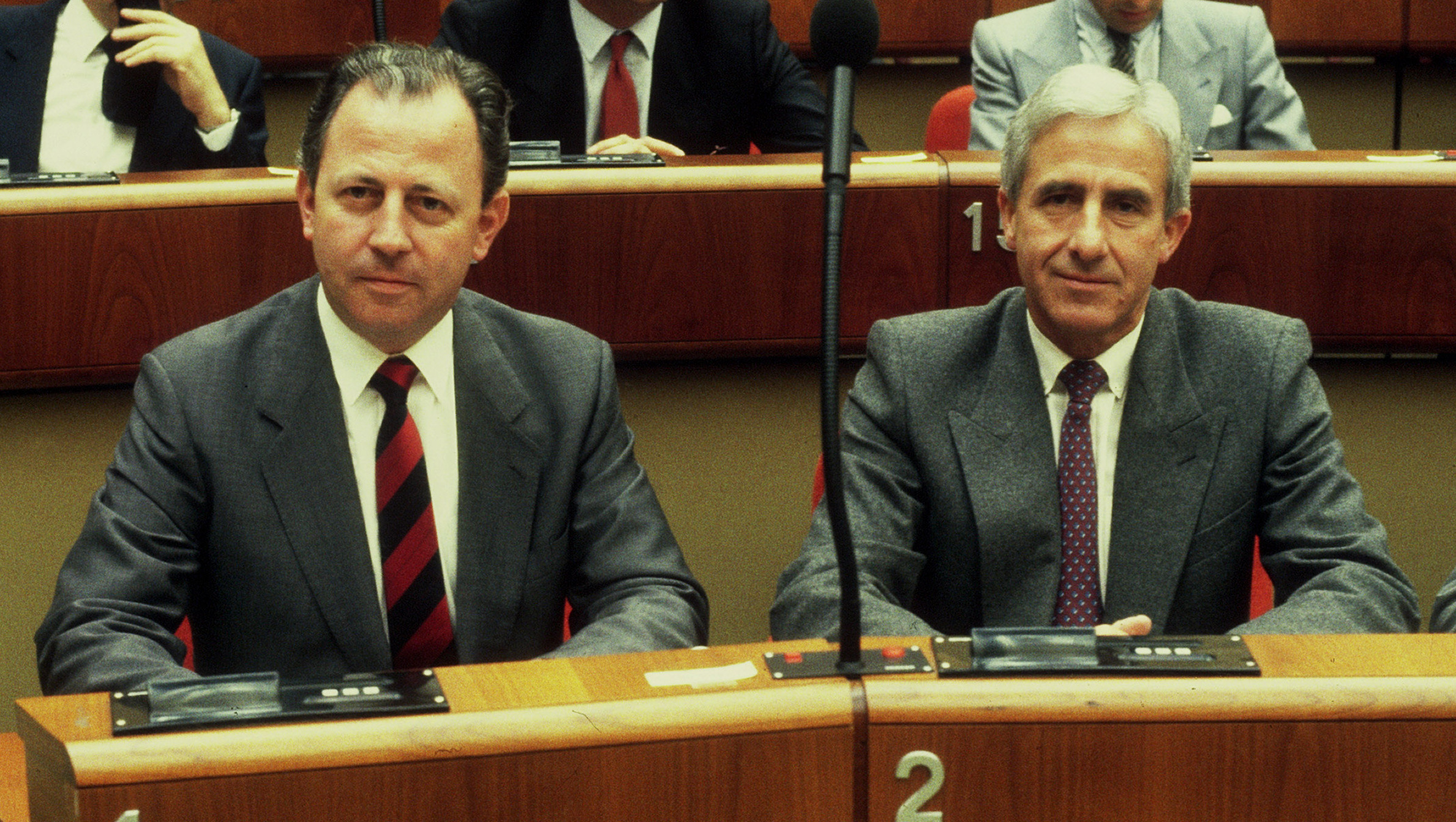
- Santer (left) and Poos (right) in 1989
- Date formed: 20 July 1984
- Date dissolved: 14 July 1989 (4 years, 11 months, 3 weeks and 3 days)

People and organisations
- Grand Duke: Jean
- Prime Minister: Jacques Santer
- Deputy Prime Minister: Jacques Poos
- Total no. of members: 12
- Member parties: CSV; LSAP
- Status in legislature: Centre-left to centre-right coalition government
- Opposition parties: DP; ADR; GAP; KPL
- Opposition leader: Colette Flesch (Note: De facto leader of the opposition as the leader of the largest opposition group in the Chamber of Deputes.)

History
- Election: 1984 general election
- Legislature term: 27th Legislature of the Chamber of Deputies
- Predecessor: Werner-Flesch Government
- Successor: Santer-Poos II Government

The Santer-Poos I Government was the government of Luxembourg between 20 July 1984 and 14 July 1989. It was the first of three led by Prime Minister Jacques Santer, and the first to have Jacques Poos as Deputy Prime Minister.

It was formed following the general election of 1984. It represented a coalition between Santer's Christian Social People's Party (CSV) and Poos' Luxembourg Socialist Workers' Party (LSAP), which had been elected the largest and second-largest parties in the legislature.

== Background ==
In the election of 17 June 1984, the number of seats had been raised from 59 to 64. The Democratic Party lost one seat compared with the previous election, while the CSV gained one, even though its share of the vote fell slightly. The LSAP made large gains, winning 21 seats. Partly, this was because the left-wing vote was no longer split between the LSAP and the Social Democratic Party. The socialists had campaigned against the austerity policy of the previous government. The elections of 1984 saw a green party campaigning for the first time, the Green Alternative Party, which received two seats.

With the previous prime minister Pierre Werner retiring from political life, Jacques Santer was now charged with forming a government, and his CSV entered into coalition with the LSAP. This coalition was to last for three legislative periods.

== Foreign policy ==
The Santer-Poos government was active in the project of European integration, while attempting to safeguard Luxembourg's interests. For six months from 1 July 1985, Luxembourg held the presidency of the European Community.

During this period, important decisions were taken to drive forward to process of European integration. At the European Council of Milan, on 28–29 June 1985, the foundations were laid for the future Single European Act, which aimed to dismantle internal barriers between the member states of the European Community and introduce the free circulation of goods, capital and services.

Apart from Europe, developing countries became an important target of Luxembourg's foreign policy. From 1984, the secretary of state for foreign trade and cooperation, Robert Goebbels, presented three bills which organised Luxembourgish development aid in a coherent manner, created the Fund for Development Cooperation (Fonds de la coopération au développement), regulated state subsidies to Luxembourgish non-governmental organisations, and introduced new fiscal measures to encourage philanthropy.

== Economic policy ==
The structural crisis in the steel industry remained a major problem for the government's economic policy, even though the crisis was starting to lessen. As matters were generally starting to evolve in a more positive direction, the government started to ease up slightly on the austerity policy that had been in place since the start of the crisis. The laws of 24 December 1984, and of 30 June 1986, widened the system of automatic indexation of salaries and wages.

The Santer-Poos government continued with the "niche" policy of its predecessors. The decline of the steel industry was compensated by the promotion of new industries. The legal environment put in place by the state was favourable to the development of the finance and media sectors. In 1985, Société Européenne des Satellites (SES) was created, on the basis of a concession from the Luxembourgish state. The government gave the SES a state guarantee, in order to allow the financing of the Astra system of satellites. After having had some success in the domain of television broadcasts by satellite, the authorities tried to support audiovisual production. The law of 13 December 1988 introduced certificates of audiovisual investment, which gave their owners considerable tax allowances. In the course of the same year, the government adapted existing legislation to a 1985 European Directive concerning the legal framework on Undertakings for Collective Investment in Transferable Securities. This adaptation gave a new impetus to the investment fund sector.

== Social policy ==
In social policy, the government pursued a policy aimed at reinforcing national solidarity. It proceeded to increase family allowances and pensions. One major novelty was the introduction of a guaranteed minimum income.

== Ministers ==
Name	Portrait	Party	Office
Jacques Santer		CSV	Prime Minister; Minister for Finances
Jacques Poos		LSAP	Deputy Prime Minister; Minister for Foreign Affairs, Foreign Trade, and Cooperation; Minister for the Economy and the Middle Class; Minister for the Treasury
Benny Berg		LSAP	Minister for Health; Minister for Social Security
Robert Krieps		LSAP	Minister for Justice; Minister for Cultural Affairs; Minister for the Environment
Fernand Boden		CSV	Minister for National Education and Youth; Minister for Tourism
Jean Spautz		CSV	Minister for the Interior; Minister for the Family, Social Housing, and Social Solidarity
Jean-Claude Juncker		CSV	Minister for Work; Delegate to the Department for Finances; Charge of the Budget
Marcel Schlechter		LSAP	Minister for Transport; Minister for Public Works; Minister for Energy
Marc Fischbach		CSV	Minister for Agriculture, Viticulture, and Rural Development; Minister for the Police Force; Minister for the Civil Service; Minister for Physical Education and Sport
Johny Lahure		LSAP	Secretary of State for the Economy
René Steichen		CSV	Secretary of State for Agriculture and Viticulture
Robert Goebbels		LSAP	Secretary of State for Foreign Affairs, Foreign Trade, and Cooperation; Secretary of State for the Middle Class
Source: Service Information et Presse
