= Georges Wohlfart =

Luxembourgish politician (1950-2013)

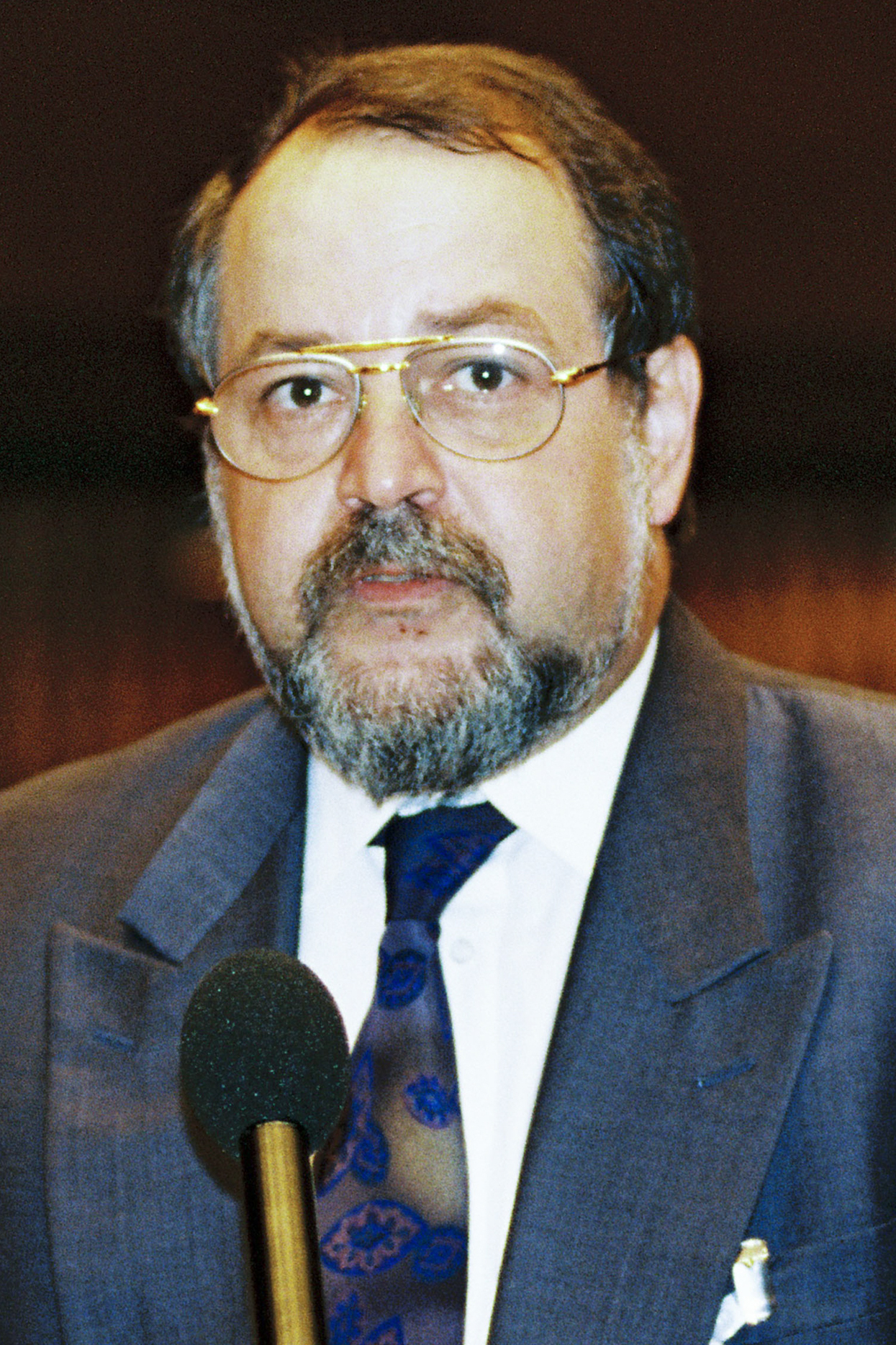
Wohlfart in 1997

Dr Georges Wohlfart (13 July 1950 – 13 February 2013) was a Luxembourgish politician.

Wohlfart was born in 1950 in Helmdange. A member of the Luxembourg Socialist Workers' Party, he served in consecutive cabinets, under Jacques Santer and Jean-Claude Juncker, from 1989 until 1999, holding positions including Minister of Health (1998–1999) and Trade Minister.
