= Jacques Santer =

Luxembourgish and European Union politician (born 1937)

His Excellency Jacques Santer
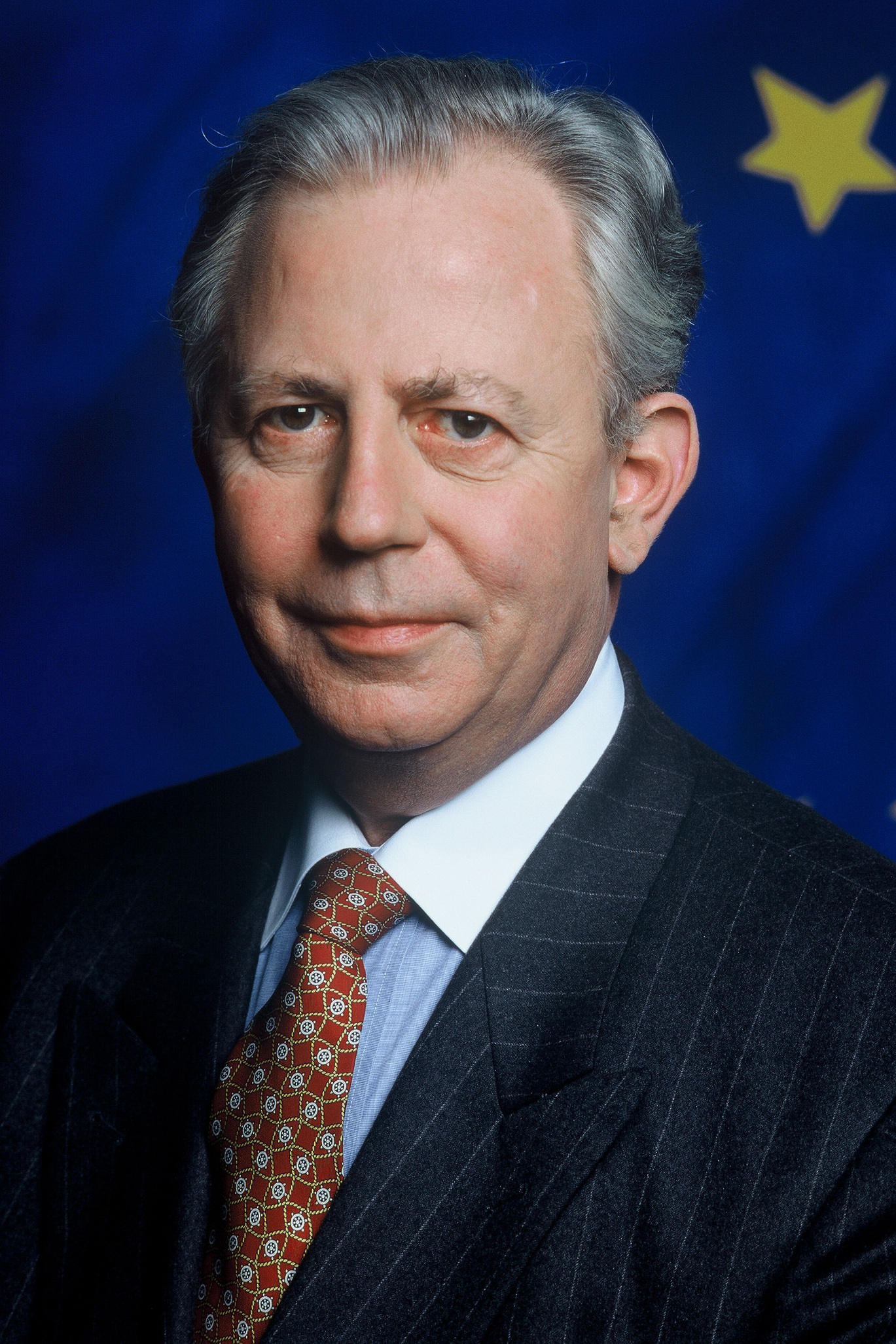
- Official portrait, 1995

President of the European Commission
- In office 23 January 1995 – 15 March 1999
- Vice President: Leon Brittan
- Preceded by: Jacques Delors
- Succeeded by: Manuel Marín (Acting)

Prime Minister of Luxembourg
- In office 20 July 1984 – 20 January 1995
- Monarch: Jean
- Deputy: Jacques Poos
- Preceded by: Pierre Werner
- Succeeded by: Jean-Claude Juncker

Minister for Finances
- In office 16 July 1979 – 14 July 1989
- Prime Minister: Pierre Werner; Himself
- Preceded by: Jacques Poos
- Succeeded by: Jean-Claude Juncker

Minister for Labour and Social Security
- In office 16 July 1979 – 20 July 1984
- Prime Minister: Pierre Werner
- Preceded by: Benny Berg
- Succeeded by: Jean-Claude Juncker

Member of the Chamber of Deputies
- In office 27 June 1974 – 16 July 1979
- Constituency: Centre

Personal details
- Born: Jacques Louis Santer; 18 May 1937 (age 89) Wasserbillig, Luxembourg
- Party: Christian Social People's Party
- Other political affiliations: European People's Party
- Spouse: Danièle Binot (m. 1967; died 2011)
- Children: 2, including Patrick
- Education: Sciences Po; University of Strasbourg
- Jacques Santer's voice Santer on the introduction of the euro Recorded 12 December 1998

Jacques Louis Santer (Note: Luxembourgish pronunciation: [ʒaːk ˈsɑntə]) (born 18 May 1937) is a Luxembourgish politician who served as president of the European Commission from 1995 to 1999 before resigning amidst allegations of corruption. He served as the finance minister of Luxembourg from 1979 until 1989, and as prime minister of Luxembourg from 1984 to 1995, as a member of the Christian Social People's Party (CSV), which was the leading party in the Luxembourgish government between 1979 and 2013. As prime minister of Luxembourg, he also led the negotiations on the Single European Act, which effectively set aside the 20-year-old Luxembourg compromise.

== Career ==
Santer graduated in 1959 from Sciences Po, before receiving his doctorate in law from the University of Strasbourg in 1961. From 1972 to 1974 he was a junior minister in the Luxembourgish government. From 1979 to 1984 he was Minister of Finance, Minister for Work and Minister for Social Security, under Pierre Werner, in the coalition government between the Christian Social People's Party (CSV) and the liberal Democratic Party.

After the general election of 1984, Werner retired as prime minister and from political life in general, and Santer became the new prime minister. He and the CSV now formed a new coalition with the Luxembourg Socialist Workers' Party (LSAP), which had come out of the elections as the second-largest party in the legislature, beating the Democratic Party into third place; the CSV remained the largest party. This CSV/LSAP coalition was to last until 1999.

On 10 November 1990 an article appeared in the Zeitung vum Lëtzebuerger Vollek, the title of which translated into "Five years of state secret – The bombing NATO terror commando", which caused a parliamentary inquiry in which Santer was forced to reveal the existence of a stay-behind army in Luxembourg and being politically responsible to call for its dissolution. The organisation was active since its creation by the then prime minister Pierre Werner in 1959 and was organised by the secret service of Luxembourg, the Service de Renseignement de l'Etat (SREL) and coordinated by the NATO. On 17 December 1990 he told the constitutional committee the organisation had never more than 12 members and was only foreseen to handle intelligence operations, as well as escape and evasion manoeuvers. There were weapons caches established in 1973, but direct access would not have been granted, according to Santer. On 14 October 1990, the remaining members of the organisation were informed and requested to return their radio communication equipment.

=== Presidency of the European Commission ===
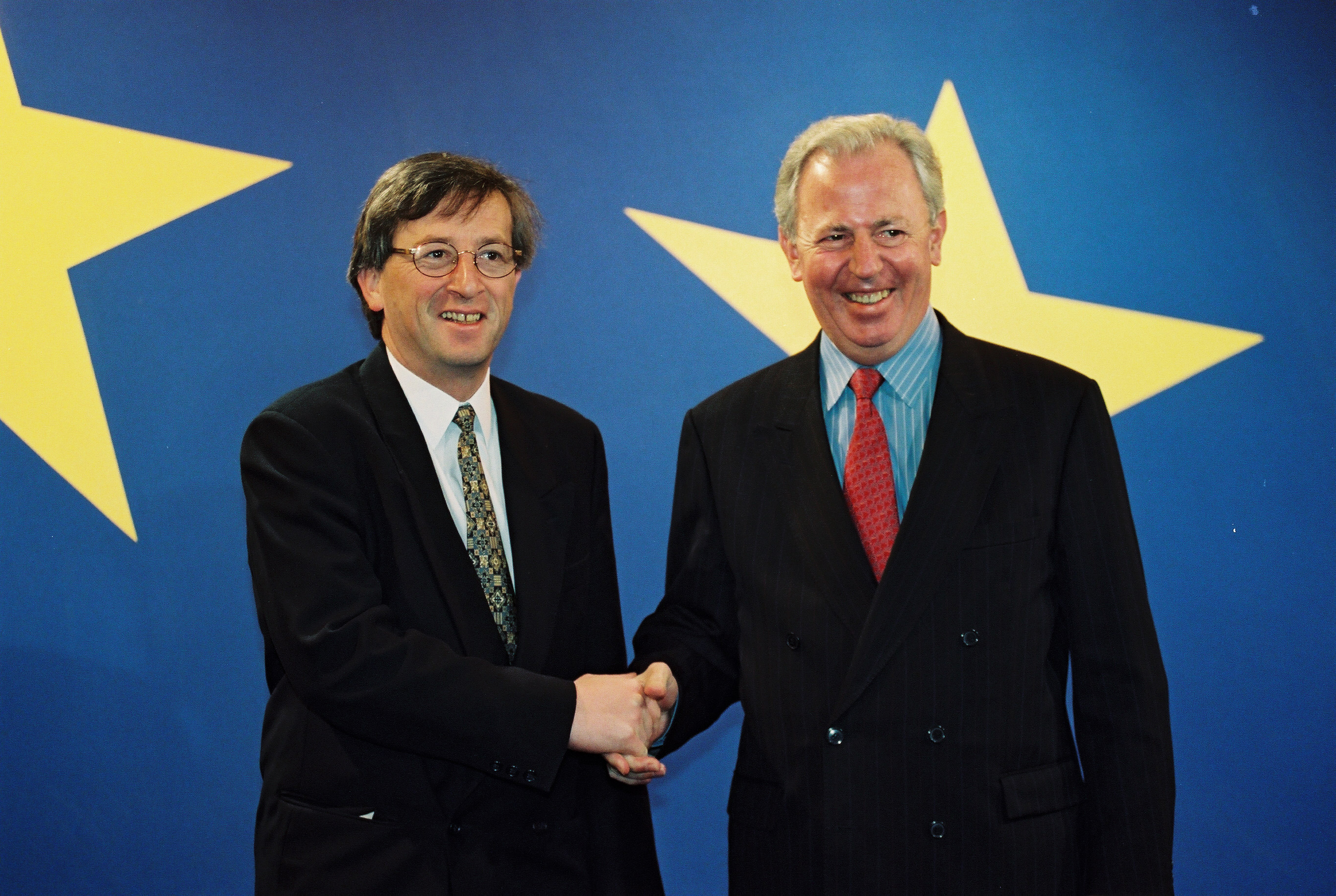
Santer meets with Luxembourgish Prime Minister Jean-Claude Juncker in 5 February 1997

Santer became the ninth President of the European Commission in 1995 as a compromise choice between the United Kingdom and a Franco-German alliance, after the Franco-German nominee Jean-Luc Dehaene was vetoed by British prime minister John Major. Santer's selection was barely ratified by a European Parliament upset with the process for which Commission presidents are selected.

In the same year, 1995, Santer became the first recipient of the Vision for Europe Award.

Allegations of corruption concerning individual EU commissioners led to an investigation into administrative failings (incompetence and malpractice) by a so-called Committee of Independent Experts. Despite clearing most commissioners, the report stated that they had not found a single person showing the slightest sense of responsibility. Because the implicated commissioners refused to resign and the president of the European Commission did not have the power to dismiss individual commissioners, Santer and his entire commission resigned on 15 March 1999, the very day of the report's publication. As the Commission would only have lasted for half a year from then, he was replaced by Vice-President Manuel Marín on an interim basis.

=== Later career ===
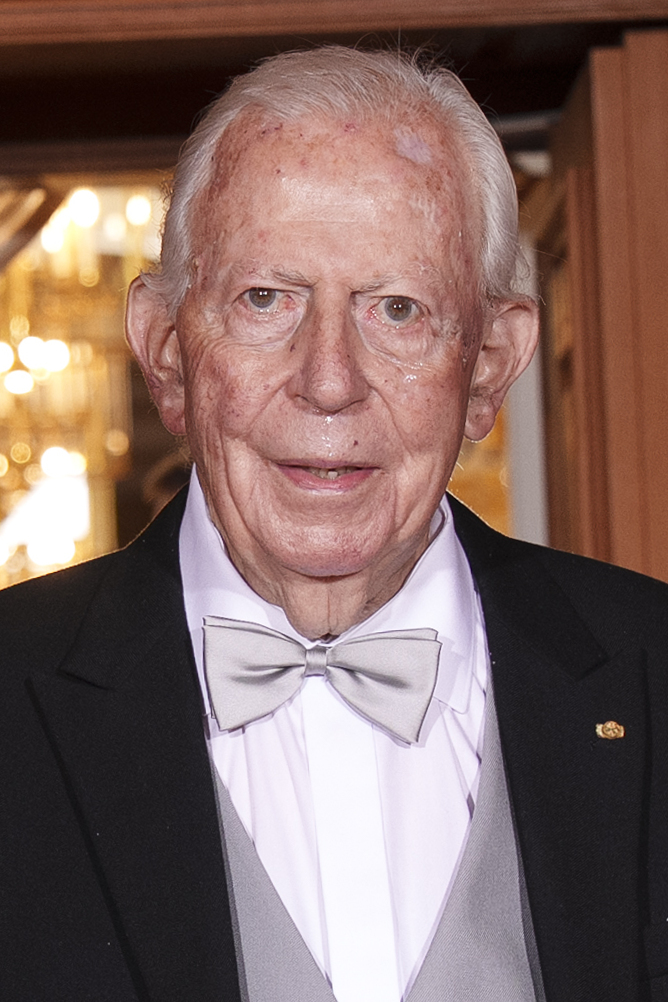
Santer in 2025

In the October 1999 communal elections, Santer was the CSV's candidate for Mayor of Luxembourg City, with a promise to make the city attractive and "family-friendly". He was unsuccessful, as the DP, headed by incumbent mayor Paul Helminger, remained the largest party on the city's communal council, and chose to keep his seat at the European Parliament, to which he had been elected in June of that year. He remained an MEP until 2004.

He also was on General Mediterranean Holdings' board, a financial holding owned by Anglo-Iraqi Nadhmi Auchi.

In January 2012, Santer was appointed to head the board of the Special Purpose Investment Vehicle (SPIV), which was designed to boost the firepower of the European Financial Stability Facility, the eurozone rescue fund.

In May 2013, Santer became an Honorary Member of SME Europe, the official pro-business organisation of the European People's Party.

== Honours ==
- Iceland : Grand Cross of the Order of the Falcon (1990)
- Japan : Grand Cordon of the Order of the Rising Sun (2015)
- Luxembourg : Grand Cross of the Order of the Oak Crown
- Luxembourg : Grand Cross of the Order of Merit of the Grand Duchy of Luxembourg
- Poland : Golden Medal for Merit to Culture – Gloria Artis (2008)
- Portugal : Grand Cross of the Order of Prince Henry (1990)
- Portugal : Grand Cross of the Military Order of Christ (1988)
- Romania : Grand Cross of the National Order of Faithful Service (2004)
- Italy: Knight Grand Cross of the Order of Merit of the Italian Republic (26 October 1973)

== See also ==
- List of prime ministers of Luxembourg
- Santer-Poos I Government
- Santer-Poos II Government
- Santer-Poos III Government
- Santer Commission

Political offices
Preceded by Jacques Poos	Minister for Finances; 1979–1989	Succeeded by Jean-Claude Juncker
Preceded by Pierre Werner	Prime Minister of Luxembourg; 1984–1995	Succeeded by Jean-Claude Juncker
Preceded by Jacques Delors	President of the European Commission; 1995–1999	Succeeded by Manuel Marín
Party political offices
Preceded by Nicolas Mosar	President of the CSV; 1974–1982	Succeeded by Jean Spautz
