= Marie-Josée Jacobs =

Luxembourgish politician

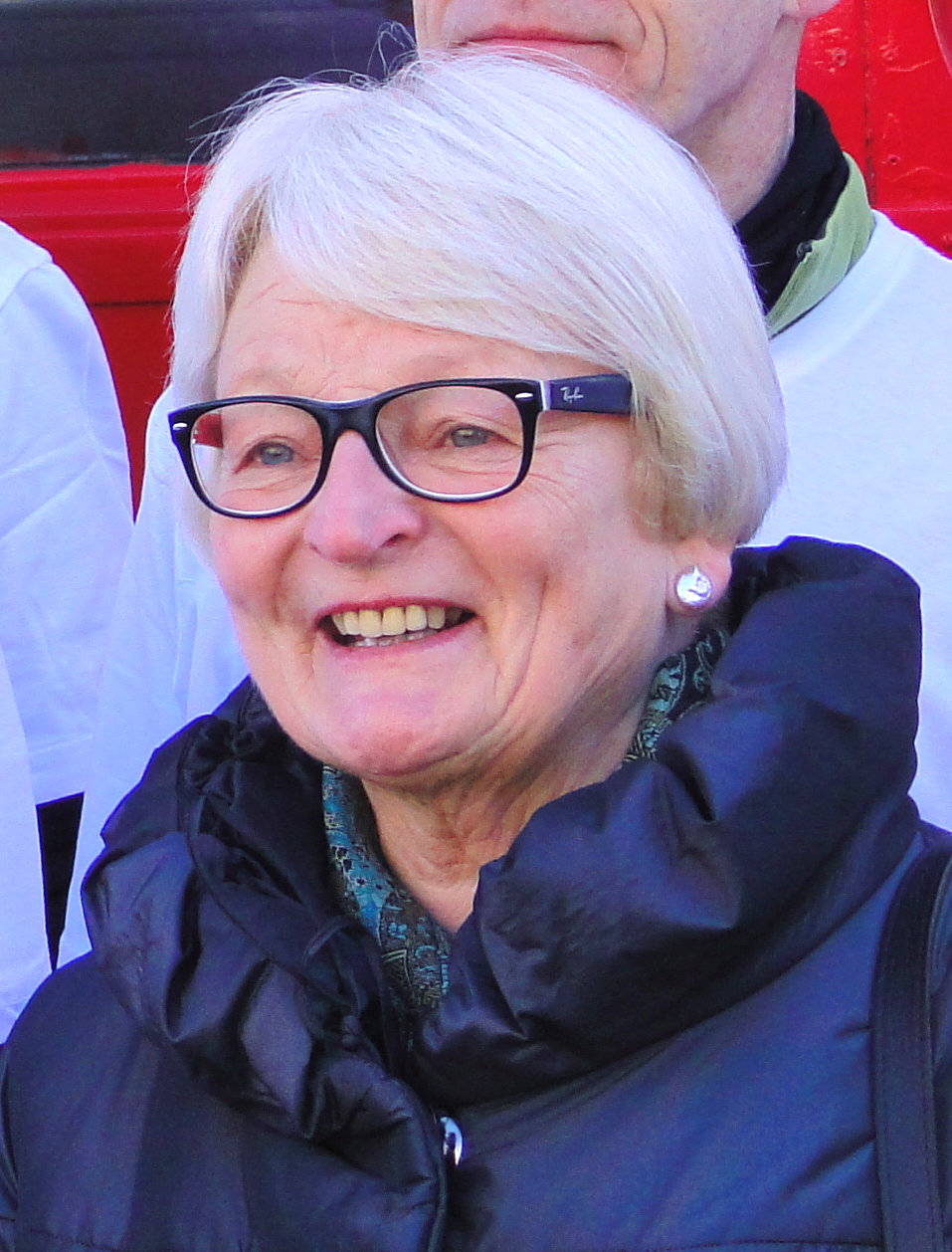
Jacobs in 2015

Marie-Josée Jacobs (born 22 January 1950 in Marnach) is a Luxembourgish politician of the Christian Social People's Party (CSV).

Jacobs has been active in the Lëtzebuerger Chrëschtleche Gewerkschaftsbond (LCGB). She was a member of the Chamber of Deputies from 1984 to 1992, when she joined the government. She served under Jacques Santer as Minister for Agriculture (1992-1995), then under Jean-Claude Juncker as Minister for Family (1995-2013).
