= 1981 in Luxembourg =

- Decades: 1960s; 1970s; 1980s; 1990s; 2000s
- See also: History of Luxembourg; List of years in Luxembourg

The following lists events that happened during 1981 in the Grand Duchy of Luxembourg.

== Incumbents ==
Position	Incumbent
Grand Duke	Jean
Prime Minister	Pierre Werner
Deputy Prime Minister	Colette Flesch
President of the Chamber of Deputies	Léon Bollendorff
President of the Council of State	François Goerens
Mayor of Luxembourg City	Camille Polfer

== Events ==
=== January – March ===
- 6 January – Gaston Thorn takes up his post as President of the European Commission.
- 2 February – A new newspaper, Haut, is launched.
- 14 February – Hereditary Grand Duke Henri marries Maria Teresa Mestre.

=== April – June ===
- 4 April – Representing Luxembourg, Jean-Claude Pascal finishes eleventh in the Eurovision Song Contest 1981 with the song C'est Peut-Etre Pas L'Amerique.
- 23 April – Rights of confidentiality that patients enjoy with doctors are applied to bankers and clients to help promote Luxembourg as a financial centre.
- 14 June – The Soviet Union's Yuri Barinov wins the 1981 Tour de Luxembourg.

=== July – September ===
- 7 July – The European Parliament passes a resolution to 'review' the seat of the Secretariat being in Luxembourg City.
- 31 July – A Belgian fighter jet collides with the 285 m Dudelange Radio Tower, destroying the tower and killing a couple in a nearby house.
- 7 August – Luxembourg files an appeal with the European Court of Justice against the European Parliament's resolution of 7 July.
- 15 September – Christian Calmes is appointed Grand Marshal of Luxembourg.

=== October – December ===
- 10 October – Communal elections are held across Luxembourg.
- 31 December – Camille Polfer steps down as Mayor of Luxembourg City after only two years, due to ill health, and is succeeded by his daughter, Lydie the following day.

== Births ==
- 1 June – Tessy Scholtes, kareteka
- 16 September - Francesco Tristano Schlimé, pianist
- 11 November – Guillaume, Hereditary Grand Duke of Luxembourg

== Deaths ==
- 16 September – Émile Colling, politician
