= 1980 in Luxembourg =

- Decades: 1960s; 1970s; 1980s; 1990s; 2000s
- See also: History of Luxembourg; List of years in Luxembourg

The following lists events that happened during 1980 in the Grand Duchy of Luxembourg.

== Incumbents ==
Position	Incumbent
Grand Duke	Jean
Prime Minister	Pierre Werner
Deputy Prime Minister	Gaston Thorn (until 22 November); Colette Flesch (from 22 November)
President of the Chamber of Deputies	Léon Bollendorff
President of the Council of State	Alex Bonn (until 18 June); François Goerens (from 20 June)
Mayor of Luxembourg City	Colette Flesch (until 22 November); Camille Polfer (from 22 November)

== Events ==
=== January – March ===
- 22 February – Minister Jean Wolter dies, and is replaced by Jean Spautz.

=== April – June ===
- 19 April – Representing Luxembourg, Sophie & Magaly finish ninth in the Eurovision Song Contest 1980 with the song Papa Pingouin.
- 1 May – In football, Luxembourg beats Thailand 1-0: Luxembourg's first international victory since 1973.
- 9 May – The Luxembourgian national football team beats South Korea 3–2. This was Luxembourg's last international victory until 1995.
- 8 June – The Netherlands' Bert Oosterbosch wins the 1980 Tour de Luxembourg.

=== July – September ===
- 1 July – Footballer Robby Langers transfers from Union Luxembourg to German club Borussia Mönchengladbach.

=== October – December ===
- 21 November – Gaston Thorn is named as President of the European Commission.
- 22 November – Gaston Thorn steps down as Deputy Prime Minister and Minister for Foreign Affairs of Luxembourg and is succeeded by Colette Flesch. Camille Polfer replaces Flesch as Mayor of Luxembourg City.

== Births ==
- 15 April – Fränk Schleck, cyclist

== Deaths ==
- 22 February – Jean Wolter, politician
- 27 June – Marcel Fischbach, politician
- 12 July – Arsène Mersch, cyclist
- 23 October – Auguste Trémont, artist
