= 1989 in Luxembourg =

- Decades: 1960s; 1970s; 1980s; 1990s; 2000s
- See also: History of Luxembourg; List of years in Luxembourg

The following lists events that happened during 1989 in the Grand Duchy of Luxembourg.

== Incumbents ==
Position	Incumbent
Grand Duke	Jean
Prime Minister	Jacques Santer
Deputy Prime Minister	Jacques Poos
President of the Chamber of Deputies	Léon Bollendorff; Erna Hennicot-Schoepges
President of the Council of State	Georges Thorn
Mayor of Luxembourg City	Lydie Polfer

== Events ==
=== January – March ===
- 5 February – SES' Astra 1A satellite starts broadcasting, beginning SES's dominance of the European satellite communication market.

=== April – June ===
- 19 April – 150th anniversary of Luxembourg's independence.
- 6 May – Representing Luxembourg, Park Cafe finish twentieth in the Eurovision Song Contest 1989 with the song Monsieur.
- 13 June – The constitution is amended in numerous ways, affecting electoral eligibility requirements, expanding education access, and requiring counter-signature of Grand Ducal decree.
- 18 June – Legislative and European elections are held. The four established parties all lose ground to three new parties: Action Committee 5/6, GAP, and GLEI.

=== July – September ===
- 7 July – A law is passed to strengthen the fight against money laundering.
- 14 July – Jacques Santer forms a new government, keeping Jacques Poos as his deputy.

=== October – December ===
- 12 November – The Action Committee 5/6 Pensions for Everyone changes its name to 'Action Committee 5/6'.
