= 1982 in Luxembourg =

- Decades: 1960s; 1970s; 1980s; 1990s; 2000s
- See also: History of Luxembourg; List of years in Luxembourg

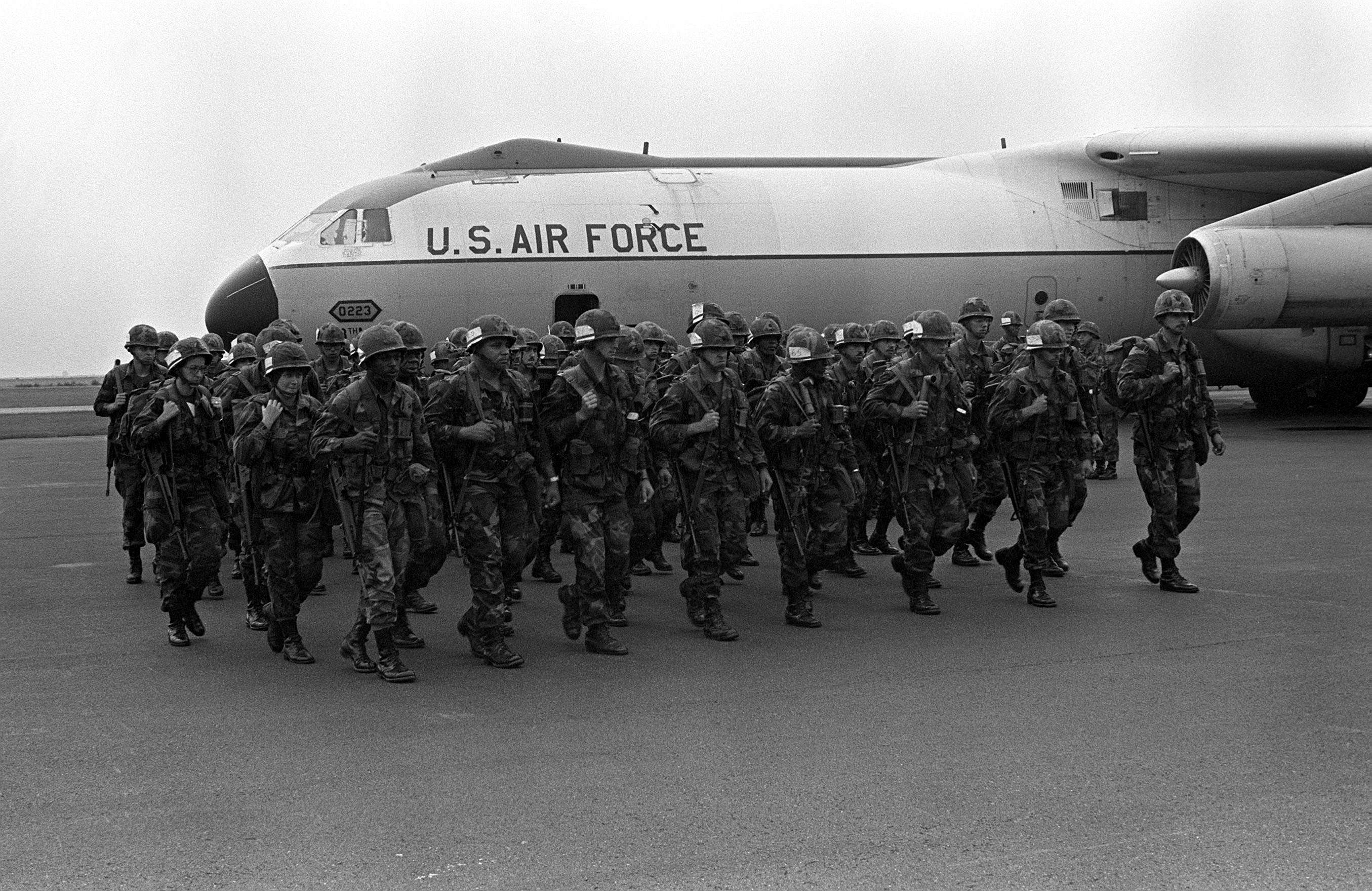
Members of the 701st Maintenance Battalion, U.S. Army, arriving at Luxembourg International Airport for Exercise REFORGER '82 on 1 September 1982

The following lists events that happened during 1982 in the Grand Duchy of Luxembourg.

== Incumbents ==
Position	Incumbent
Grand Duke	Jean
Prime Minister	Pierre Werner
Deputy Prime Minister	Colette Flesch
President of the Chamber of Deputies	Léon Bollendorff
President of the Council of State	François Goerens
Mayor of Luxembourg City	Lydie Polfer

== Events ==
=== January – March ===
- 1 January – Lydie Polfer becomes the new Mayor of Luxembourg City.
- 22 February – Belgium unilaterally devalues the Belgian franc by 8.5%, without consulting Luxembourg, whose franc is pegged to it. Luxembourg is forced to follow unwillingly.
- 27 March – 40,000 people protest in the streets at the government's response to the crisis in the steel industry.

=== April – June ===
- 8 April – A law is passed to restrict the indexing of wage settlements in an attempt to stem inflation, which peaks at 9.4% over 1982.
- 24 April – Representing Luxembourg, Svetlana finishes sixth in the Eurovision Song Contest 1982 with the song Cours après le temps.
- 13 June – France's Bernard Hinault wins the 1982 Tour de Luxembourg.
- 13 July – A law is passed to give government subsidies to aid foreign direct investment in Luxembourg.

=== July – September ===
- 29 September – An Aeroflot flight crashes whilst landing at Luxembourg-Findel, killing six.

=== October – December ===
- 3 December – Camille Ney resigns from the government due to poor health.
- 21 December – Ernest Mühlen is appointed in Camille Ney's place as minister, whilst Jean-Claude Juncker is promoted to secretary of state.

== Deaths ==
- 14 November – Lucien Bidinger, cyclist
