= Iceland national football team results (2000–2019) =

Win Draw Loss

This is a list of the Iceland national football team results from 2000 to 2019. Only games against full national sides are counted.

== 2000 ==
31 January 2000 2000–01 Nordic Football Championship	Iceland	0–0	Norway	La Manga, Spain
12:30 UTC+1		Report		Stadium: La Manga Stadium; Attendance: 250; Referee: Nicolai Vollquartz (Denmark)

2 February 2000 2000–01 Nordic Football Championship	Finland	0–1	Iceland	La Manga, Spain
		Report	Daðason 45'	Stadium: La Manga Stadium; Attendance: 350; Referee: Lassin Isaksen (Faroe Islands)

4 February 2000 2000–01 Nordic Football Championship	Faroe Islands	2–3	Iceland	La Manga, Spain
	Mørkøre 19'; Jónsson 37'	Report	Daðason 40', 57'; Gunnlaugsson 66'	Stadium: La Manga Stadium; Attendance: 57; Referee: Rune Pedersen (Norway)

27 July 2000 Friendly	Iceland	5–0	Malta	Reykjavík, Iceland
20:00 UTC+0	Sverrisson 19'; Sigurðsson 36', 56', 77' (pen.); Helguson 41'	Report		Stadium: Laugardalsvöllur; Attendance: 2,390; Referee: Knud Erik Fisker (Denmark)

16 August 2000 2000–01 Nordic Football Championship	Iceland	2–1	Sweden	Reykjavík, Iceland
18:45 UTC+0	Daðason 38'; Sigurðsson 84' (pen.)	Report	Mjällby 23'	Stadium: Laugardalsvöllur; Attendance: 5,116; Referee: Kenny Clark (Scotland)

2 September 2000 2002 FIFA World Cup qualification	Iceland	1–2	Denmark	Reykjavík, Iceland
18:00 UTC+0	E. Sverrisson 12'	Report	Tomasson 26'; Bisgaard 48'	Stadium: Laugardalsvöllur; Attendance: 7,017; Referee: Stéphane Bré (France)

7 October 2000 2002 FIFA World Cup qualification	Czech Republic	4–0	Iceland	Teplice, Czech Republic
17:00 UTC+1	Koller 17', 40'; Nedvěd 44', 90'	Report		Stadium: Na Stínadlech; Attendance: 9,843; Referee: Kyros Vassaras (Greece)

11 October 2000 2002 FIFA World Cup qualification	Iceland	1–0	Northern Ireland	Reykjavík, Iceland
19:30 UTC+0	Th. Guðjónsson 89'	Report		Stadium: Laugardalsvöllur; Attendance: 6,780; Referee: Markus Merk (Germany)

15 November 2000 Friendly	Poland	1–0	Iceland	Warsaw, Poland
18:00 UTC+1	Frankowski 62' (pen.)	Report		Stadium: Polish Army Stadium; Attendance: 5,000; Referee: Costas Kapitanis (Cyprus)

== 2001 ==
11 January 2001 Millennium Super Soccer Cup	Uruguay B	2–1	Iceland	Kochi, India
17:30 UTC+5:30	Umpiérrez 26' (pen.); Varela 29'	Report	Hinriksson 32'	Stadium: Jawaharlal Nehru Stadium; Attendance: 2,340; Referee: Abdul Hamid Halim (Malaysia)

13 January 2001 Millennium Super Soccer Cup	India	0–3	Iceland	Kochi, India
17:00 UTC+5:30		Report	Guðmundsson 44', 52', 69'	Stadium: Jawaharlal Nehru Stadium; Attendance: 23,000; Referee: Arambekade Deshapriya (Sri Lanka)

20 January 2001 Millennium Super Soccer Cup	Chile	2–0	Iceland	Kolkata, India
18:30 UTC+5:30	González 37', 50'	Report		Stadium: Salt Lake Stadium; Attendance: 11,230; Referee: Hassan Marshoud (Jordan)

24 March 2001 2002 FIFA World Cup qualification	Bulgaria	2–1	Iceland	Sofia, Bulgaria
18:00 UTC+2	Chomakov 36'; Berbatov 79'	Report	Hreidarsson 25'	Stadium: Balgarska Armia Stadium; Attendance: 15,600; Referee: Mike Riley (England)

25 April 2001 2002 FIFA World Cup qualification	Malta	1–4	Iceland	Ta' Qali, Malta
19:00 UTC+2	Mifsud 14'	Report	T. Guðmundsson 42'; He. Sigurdsson 44'; E. Guðjohnsen 81'; Th. Guðjónsson 90'	Stadium: Ta' Qali National Stadium; Attendance: 2,800; Referee: Constantin Zotta (Romania)

2 June 2001 2002 FIFA World Cup qualification	Iceland	3–0	Malta	Reykjavík, Iceland
16:00 UTC+0	T. Guðmundsson 7'; Daðason 38'; E. Guðjohnsen 68'	Report		Stadium: Laugardalsvöllur; Attendance: 3,554; Referee: Romāns Lajuks (Latvia)

6 June 2001 2002 FIFA World Cup qualification	Iceland	1–1	Bulgaria	Reykjavík, Iceland
18:00 UTC+0	Daðason 43'	Report	Berbatov 81'	Stadium: Laugardalsvöllur; Attendance: 4,316; Referee: Dermot Gallagher (England)

15 August 2001 Friendly	Iceland	1–1	Poland	Reykjavík, Iceland
18:00 UTC+0	Sigþórsson 86'	Report	Hreiðarsson 17' (o.g.)	Stadium: Laugardalsvöllur; Attendance: 4,345; Referee: Mario van der Ende (Netherlands)

1 September 2001 2002 FIFA World Cup qualification	Iceland	3–1	Czech Republic	Reykjavík, Iceland
14:00 UTC+0	E. Sverrisson 45', 77'; A. Sigthórsson 66'	Report	Jankulovski 88'	Stadium: Laugardalsvöllur; Attendance: 6,625; Referee: Domenico Messina (Italy)

5 September 2001 2002 FIFA World Cup qualification	Northern Ireland	3–0	Iceland	Belfast, Northern Ireland
20:00 UTC+1	Healy 48'; Hughes 58'; McCartney 61'	Report		Stadium: Windsor Park; Attendance: 6,625; Referee: Attila Hanacsek (Hungary)

6 October 2001 2002 FIFA World Cup qualification	Denmark	6–0	Iceland	Copenhagen, Denmark
20:15 UTC+2	Rommedahl 12'; Sand 14', 66'; Gravesen 31', 35'; Michaelsen 90'	Report		Stadium: Parken Stadium; Attendance: 41,769; Referee: Arturo Daudén Ibáñez (Spain)

== 2002 ==
8 January 2002 Friendly	Kuwait	0–0	Iceland	Muscat, Oman
15:30 UTC+4		Report		Stadium: Al-Seeb Stadium; Attendance: 1,000; Referee: Abdullah Al Harrasi (Oman)

10 January 2002 Friendly	Saudi Arabia	1–0	Iceland	Riyadh, Saudi Arabia
19:45 UTC+3	Jumaan 73'	Report		Stadium: Prince Faisal bin Fahd Stadium; Attendance: 1,000; Referee: Omer Al Mehannah (Saudi Arabia)

8 March 2002 Friendly	Brazil	6–1	Iceland	Cuiabá, Brazil
21:40 UTC-4	Polga 4', 73'; Kléberson 19'; Kaká 47'; Gilberto Silva 50'; Edílson 63'	Report	Steinsson 76'	Stadium: Verdão; Attendance: 30,000; Referee: Wagner Tardelli Azevedo (Brazil)

22 May 2002 Friendly	Norway	1–1	Iceland	Bodø, Norway
20:00 UTC+2	Solskjær 59'	Report	Guðjónsson 4'	Stadium: Aspmyra stadion Attendance: 8,126; Referee: Ceri Richards (Wales)

21 August 2002 Friendly	Iceland	3–0	Andorra	Reykjavík, Iceland
19:30 UTC+0	Guðjohnsen 19'; Daðason 26', 43'	Report		Stadium: Laugardalsvöllur; Attendance: 2,982; Referee: Lassin Isaksen (Faroe Islands)

7 September 2002 Friendly	Iceland	0–2	Hungary	Reykjavík, Iceland
16:00 UTC+0		Report	Lőw 80'; Dárdai 85'	Stadium: Laugardalsvöllur; Attendance: 3,190; Referee: Jari Maisonlathi (Finland)

12 October 2002 UEFA Euro 2004 qualifying	Iceland	0–2	Scotland	Reykjavík, Iceland
14:00 UTC+0		Report	Dailly 6'; Naysmith 63'	Stadium: Laugardalsvöllur; Attendance: 7,056; Referee: Alain Sars (France)

16 October 2002 UEFA Euro 2004 qualifying	Iceland	3–0	Lithuania	Reykjavík, Iceland
18:10 UTC+0	Helguson 50'; Guðjohnsen 61', 74'	Report		Stadium: Laugardalsvöllur; Attendance: 3,513; Referee: Grzegorz Gilewski (Poland)

20 November 2002 Friendly	Estonia	2–0	Iceland	Tallinn, Estonia
18:00 UTC+2	Viikmäe 76'; Oper 88'	Report		Stadium: A. Le Coq Arena; Attendance: 1,800; Referee: Ben Haverkort (Netherlands)

== 2003 ==
29 March 2003 UEFA Euro 2004 qualifying	Scotland	2–1	Iceland	Glasgow, Scotland
15:00 UTC+0	Miller 12'; Wilkie 71'	Report	Guðjohnsen 49'	Stadium: Hampden Park; Attendance: 37,938; Referee: René Temmink (Netherlands)

30 April 2003 Friendly	Finland	3–0	Iceland	Vantaa, Finland
17:00 (UTC+3)	Litmanen 55'; Forssell 57'; Johansson 79'	Report		Stadium: Myyrmäen jalkapallostadion Attendance: 4,005; Referee: Peter Fröjdfeldt (Sweden)

7 June 2003 UEFA Euro 2004 qualifying	Iceland	2–1	Faroe Islands	Reykjavík, Iceland
16:00 UTC+0	Sigurðsson 51'; Guðmundsson 90'	Report	Jacobsen 63'	Stadium: Laugardalsvöllur; Attendance: 6,038; Referee: Miroslav Liba (Czech Republic)

11 June 2003 UEFA Euro 2004 qualifying	Lithuania	0–3	Iceland	Kaunas, Lithuania
20:00 UTC+3		Report	Guðjónsson 60'; Guðjohnsen 71'; Hreiðarsson 90'	Stadium: S. Darius and S. Girėnas Stadium; Attendance: 6,500; Referee: Sorin Corpodean (Romania)

20 August 2003 UEFA Euro 2004 qualifying	Faroe Islands	1–2	Iceland	Tórshavn, Faroe Islands
19:10 UTC+1	Jacobsen 65'	Report	Guðjohnsen 6'; Marteinsson 70'	Stadium: Tórsvøllur; Attendance: 3,416; Referee: Eduardo Iturralde González (Spain)

6 September 2003 UEFA Euro 2004 qualifying	Iceland	0–0	Germany	Reykjavík, Iceland
17:30 UTC+0		Report		Stadium: Laugardalsvöllur; Attendance: 7,065; Referee: Graham Barber (England)

11 October 2003 UEFA Euro 2004 qualifying	Germany	3–0	Iceland	Hamburg, Germany
17:00 UTC+2	Ballack 9'; Bobic 59'; Kurányi 79'	Report		Stadium: AOL Arena; Attendance: 50,821; Referee: Valentin Ivanov (Russia)

19 November 2003 Friendly	Mexico	0–0	Iceland	San Francisco, United States
20:00 UTC-8		Report		Stadium: Pacific Bell Park; Attendance: 17,000; Referee: Ali Saheli (United States)

== 2004 ==
31 March 2004 Friendly	Albania	2–1	Iceland	Tirana, Albania
20:00 UTC+2	Aliaj 42'; Bushi 78'	Report	Guðjónsson 64'	Stadium: Qemal Stafa Stadium; Attendance: 12,000; Referee: Paolo Bertini (Italy)

28 April 2004 Friendly	Latvia	0–0	Iceland	Riga, Latvia
18:00 UTC+3		Report		Stadium: Skonto Stadium; Attendance: 7,216; Referee: Sergey Shmolik (Belarus)

30 May 2004 FA Summer Tournament	Iceland	2–3	Japan	Manchester, England
12:00 UTC+1	Helguson 5', 50'	Report	Kubo 21', 36'; Alex 58' (pen.)	Stadium: City of Manchester Stadium; Attendance: 3,085; Referee: Mike Riley (England)

5 June 2004 FA Summer Tournament	England	6–1	Iceland	Manchester, England
15:30 UTC+1	Lampard 25'; Rooney 27', 38'; Vassell 57', 77'; Bridge 68'	Report	Helguson 42'	Stadium: City of Manchester Stadium; Attendance: 43,500; Referee: Jan Wegereef (Netherlands)

18 August 2004 Friendly	Iceland	2–0	Italy	Reykjavík, Iceland
21:15 UTC+0	Guðjohnsen 17'; Einarsson 19'	Report		Stadium: Laugardalsvöllur; Attendance: 20,204; Referee: Peter Fröjdfeldt (Sweden)

4 September 2004 2006 FIFA World Cup qualification	Iceland	1–3	Bulgaria	Reykjavík, Iceland
16:00 UTC+0	Guðjohnsen 51' (pen.)	(Report)	Berbatov 35', 49'; Yanev 62'	Stadium: Laugardalsvöllur; Attendance: 5,014; Referee: Alain Hamer (Luxembourg)

8 September 2004 2006 FIFA World Cup qualification	Hungary	3–2	Iceland	Budapest, Hungary
21:15 UTC+2	Gera 62'; Torghelle 75'; Szabics 79'	(Report)	Guðjohnsen 39'; I. Sigurðsson 78'	Stadium: Szusza Ferenc Stadium; Attendance: 5,461; Referee: Tom Henning Øvrebø (Norway)

9 October 2004 2006 FIFA World Cup qualification	Malta	0–0	Iceland	Ta' Qali, Malta
18:15 UTC+2		(Report)		Stadium: Ta' Qali Stadium; Attendance: 1,130; Referee: Sorin Corpodean (Romania)

13 October 2004 2006 FIFA World Cup qualification	Iceland	1–4	Sweden	Reykjavík, Iceland
18:10 UTC+0	Guðjohnsen 66'	(Report)	Larsson 24', 39'; Allbäck 27'; Wilhelmsson 45'	Stadium: Laugardalsvöllur; Attendance: 7,037; Referee: Massimo Busacca (Switzerland)

== 2005 ==
26 March 2005 2006 FIFA World Cup qualification	Croatia	4–0	Iceland	Zagreb, Croatia
18:00 UTC+1	N. Kovač 38', 75'; Šimunić 70'; Pršo 90+1'	(Report)		Stadium: Maksimir Stadium; Attendance: 17,912; Referee: Jerome Damon (South Africa)

30 March 2005 Friendly	Italy	0–0	Iceland	Padua, Italy
20:45 UTC+2		Report		Stadium: Stadio Euganeo; Attendance: 16,697; Referee: Alain Hamer (Luxembourg)

4 June 2005 2006 FIFA World Cup qualification	Iceland	2–3	Hungary	Reykjavík, Iceland
18:05 UTC+0	Guðjohnsen 17'; K. Sigurðsson 68'	(Report)	Gera 45', 56'; Huszti 73'	Stadium: Laugardalsvöllur; Attendance: 4,613; Referee: Lucílio Batista (Portugal)

8 June 2005 2006 FIFA World Cup qualification	Iceland	4–1	Malta	Reykjavík, Iceland
18:05 UTC+0	Þorvaldsson 27'; Guðjohnsen 33'; Guðmundsson 74'; V. Gunnarsson 84'	(Report)	Said 58'	Stadium: Laugardalsvöllur; Attendance: 4,887; Referee: Damir Skomina (Slovenia)

17 August 2005 Friendly	Iceland	4–1	South Africa	Reykjavík, Iceland
21:00 UTC+1	Steinsson 25'; Viðarsson 42'; Helguson 67'; V. Gunnarsson 73'	Report	Buckley 27'	Stadium: Laugardalsvöllur; Attendance: 3,302; Referee: David McKeon (Ireland)

3 September 2005 2006 FIFA World Cup qualification	Iceland	1–3	Croatia	Reykjavík, Iceland
18:05 UTC+0	Guðjohnsen 24'	(Report)	Balaban 56', 61'; Srna 82'	Stadium: Laugardalsvöllur; Attendance: 5,520; Referee: Wolfgang Stark (Germany)

7 September 2005 2006 FIFA World Cup qualification	Bulgaria	3–2	Iceland	Sofia, Bulgaria
19:00 UTC+3	Berbatov 21'; Iliev 69'; M. Petrov 86'	(Report)	Steinsson 9'; Hreiðarsson 16'	Stadium: Vasil Levski National Stadium; Attendance: 18,000; Referee: Bülent Demirlek (Turkey)

7 October 2005 Friendly	Poland	3–2	Iceland	Chorzów, Poland
17:00 UTC+2	Krzynówek 25'; Baszczyński 52'; Smolarek 64'	Report	K. Sigurðsson 15'; H. Sigurðsson 38'	Stadium: Silesian Stadium; Attendance: 7,500; Referee: Stanislav Sukhina (Russia)

12 October 2005 2006 FIFA World Cup qualification	Sweden	3–1	Iceland	Solna, Sweden
19:30 UTC+2	Ibrahimović 29'; Larsson 42'; Källström 90+1'	(Report)	Árnason 11'	Stadium: Råsunda Stadium; Attendance: 33,716; Referee: Valentin Ivanov (Russia)

== 2006 ==
28 February 2006 Friendly	Trinidad and Tobago	2–0	Iceland	London, England
18:45 UTC+0	Yorke 10', 52' (pen.)	Report		Stadium: Loftus Road; Attendance: 7,890; Referee: Mike Dean (England)

15 August 2006 Friendly	Iceland	0–0	Spain	Reykjavík, Iceland
21:00 UTC+1		Report		Stadium: Laugardalsvöllur; Attendance: 12,327; Referee: Ian Stokes (Ireland)

2 September 2006 UEFA Euro 2008 qualifying	Northern Ireland	0–3	Iceland	Belfast, Northern Ireland
15:00 UTC+1		Report	Þorvaldsson 13'; Hreiðarsson 20'; Guðjohnsen 37'	Stadium: Windsor Park; Attendance: 14,500; Referee: Tommy Skjerven (Norway)

6 September 2006 UEFA Euro 2008 qualifying	Iceland	0–2	Denmark	Reykjavík, Iceland
18:05 UTC+0		Report	Rommedahl 5'; Tomasson 33'	Stadium: Laugardalsvöllur; Attendance: 10,007; Referee: Nikolai Ivanov (Russia)

7 October 2006 UEFA Euro 2008 qualifying	Latvia	4–0	Iceland	Riga, Latvia
21:00 UTC+3	Karlsons 14'; Verpakovskis 15', 25'; Višņakovs 52'	Report		Stadium: Skonto Stadions; Attendance: 7,500; Referee: Alan Kelly (Ireland)

11 October 2006 UEFA Euro 2008 qualifying	Iceland	1–2	Sweden	Reykjavík, Iceland
18:05 UTC+0	Viðarsson 6'	Report	Källström 8'; Wilhelmsson 59'	Stadium: Laugardalsvöllur; Attendance: 10,000; Referee: Grzegorz Gilewski (Poland)

== 2007 ==
28 March 2007 UEFA Euro 2008 qualifying	Spain	1–0	Iceland	Palma de Mallorca, Spain
22:00 UTC+2	Iniesta 80'	Report		Stadium: ONO Estadi; Attendance: 20,000; Referee: Laurent Duhamel (France)

2 June 2007 UEFA Euro 2008 qualifying	Iceland	1–1	Liechtenstein	Reykjavík, Iceland
16:00 UTC+0	B. Gunnarsson 27'	Report	Rohrer 69'	Stadium: Laugardalsvöllur; Attendance: 5,139; Referee: Sten Kaldma (Estonia)

22 August 2007 Friendly	Iceland	1–1	Canada	Reykjavík, Iceland
19:05 UTC+1	Sigurðsson 62'	Report	Occéan 75'	Stadium: Laugardalsvöllur; Attendance: 4,359; Referee: Tony Asumaa (Finland)

8 September 2007 UEFA Euro 2008 qualifying	Iceland	1–1	Spain	Reykjavík, Iceland
20:00 UTC+0	Hallfreðsson 40'	Report	Iniesta 86'	Stadium: Laugardalsvöllur; Attendance: 7,000; Referee: Wolfgang Stark (Germany)

12 September 2007 UEFA Euro 2008 qualifying	Iceland	2–1	Northern Ireland	Reykjavík, Iceland
18:05 UTC+0	Björnsson 6'; Gillespie 90+1' (o.g.)	Report	Healy 72' (pen.)	Stadium: Laugardalsvöllur; Attendance: 2,500; Referee: Yuri Baskakov (Russia)

13 October 2007 UEFA Euro 2008 qualifying	Iceland	2–4	Latvia	Reykjavík, Iceland
16:00 UTC+0	Guðjohnsen 4', 52'	Report	Kļava 27'; Laizāns 31'; Verpakovskis 37', 46'	Stadium: Laugardalsvöllur; Attendance: 5,865; Referee: Mike Dean (England)

17 October 2007 UEFA Euro 2008 qualifying	Liechtenstein	3–0	Iceland	Vaduz, Liechtenstein
20:00 UTC+2	Frick 28'; Beck 80', 82'	Report		Stadium: Rheinpark; Attendance: 2,589; Referee: Christoforos Zografos (Greece)

21 November 2007 UEFA Euro 2008 qualifying	Denmark	3–0	Iceland	Copenhagen, Denmark
20:00 UTC+1	Bendtner 34'; Tomasson 44'; Kahlenberg 59'	Report		Stadium: Parken Stadium; Attendance: 15,393; Referee: Olegário Benquerença (Portugal)

== 2008 ==
2 February 2008 Malta International Football Tournament	Belarus	2–0	Iceland	Ta' Qali, Malta
14:00 UTC+1	Vasilyuk 33'; Plaskonny 47'	Report		Stadium: National Stadium; Attendance: 100; Referee: Christopher Lautier (Malta)

4 February 2008 Malta International Football Tournament	Malta	1–0	Iceland	Ta' Qali, Malta
18:45 UTC+1	Frendo 18'	Report		Stadium: National Stadium; Attendance: 2,000; Referee: Aleksei Kulbakov (Belarus)

6 February 2008 Malta International Football Tournament	Iceland	2–0	Armenia	Ta' Qali, Malta
16:30 UTC+1	Guðmundsson 45'; Thorvaldsson 72'	Report		Stadium: National Stadium; Attendance: 2,000; Referee: Joseph Attard (Malta)

16 March 2008 Friendly	Iceland	3–0	Faroe Islands	Kópavogur, Iceland
15:00 (UTC+0)	Sævarsson 45'; Benjaminsen 72' (o.g.); Guðmundsson 80'	Report		Stadium: Kórinn; Attendance: 747; Referee: Tommy Skjerven (Norway)

26 March 2008 Friendly	Slovakia	1–2	Iceland	Zlaté Moravce, Slovakia
20:15 (UTC+2)	Mintál 87'	Report	Þorvaldsson 71'; Guðjohnsen 82'	Stadium: ViOn Aréna; Attendance: 4,120; Referee: Gerald Lehner (Austria)

28 May 2008 Friendly	Iceland	0–1	Wales	Reykjavík, Iceland
20:35 (UTC+1)		Report	Evans 44'	Stadium: Laugardalsvollur; Attendance: 5,322; Referee: Adrian McCourt (Northern Ireland)

20 August 2008 Friendly	Iceland	1–1	Azerbaijan	Reykjavík, Iceland
20:45 (UTC+1)	Steinsson 56'	Report	Ramim 48'	Stadium: Laugardalsvöllur; Attendance: 5,133; Referee: Simon Lee Evans (Wales)

6 September 2008 2010 FIFA World Cup qualification	Norway	2–2	Iceland	Oslo, Norway
19:00 UTC+2	Iversen 36' (pen.), 50'	Report	Helguson 39'; Guðjohnsen 69'	Stadium: Ullevaal Stadion; Attendance: 17,254; Referee: Alon Yefet (Israel)

10 September 2008 2010 FIFA World Cup qualification	Iceland	1–2	Scotland	Reykjavík, Iceland
18:30 UTC±0	Guðjohnsen 77' (pen.)	Report	Broadfoot 18'; McFadden 59'	Stadium: Laugardalsvöllur; Attendance: 9,767; Referee: Serge Gumienny (Belgium)

11 October 2008 2010 FIFA World Cup qualification	Netherlands	2–0	Iceland	Rotterdam, Netherlands
20:45 UTC+2	Mathijsen 15'; Huntelaar 65'	Report		Stadium: Feijenoord Stadion; Attendance: 37,500; Referee: Matteo Simone Trefoloni (Italy)

15 October 2008 2010 FIFA World Cup qualification	Iceland	1–0	Macedonia	Reykjavík, Iceland
18:00 UTC±0	V. Gunnarsson 16'	Report		Stadium: Laugardalsvöllur; Attendance: 5,527; Referee: Selçuk Dereli (Turkey)

19 November 2008 Friendly	Malta	0–1	Iceland	Paola, Malta
13:30 (UTC+1)		Report	Helguson 66'	Stadium: Hibernians Stadium; Attendance: 500; Referee: Andrea De Marco (Italy)

== 2009 ==
11 February 2009 Friendly	Liechtenstein	0–2	Iceland	La Manga, Spain
15:00 UTC+1		Report	Smárason 28'; Guðjohnsen 47'	Stadium: La Manga Stadium; Attendance: 150; Referee: Petur Reinert (Faroe Islands)

22 March 2009 Friendly	Iceland	1–2	Faroe Islands	Kópavogur, Iceland
15:00 UTC+0	Sævarsson 90'	Report	Benjaminsen 21'; Antoníusson 42' (o.g.)	Stadium: Kórinn; Attendance: 553; Referee: Mike Riley (England)

1 April 2009 2010 FIFA World Cup qualification	Scotland	2–1	Iceland	Glasgow, Scotland
20:00 UTC+1	McCormack 39'; S. Fletcher 65'	Report	I. Sigurðsson 54'	Stadium: Hampden Park; Attendance: 42,259; Referee: Thomas Einwaller (Austria)

6 June 2009 2010 FIFA World Cup qualification	Iceland	1–2	Netherlands	Reykjavík, Iceland
18:45 UTC±0	K. Sigurðsson 87'	Report	De Jong 8'; Van Bommel 15'	Stadium: Laugardalsvöllur; Attendance: 9,635; Referee: Mike Dean (England)

10 June 2009 2010 FIFA World Cup qualification	Macedonia	2–0	Iceland	Skopje, Macedonia
17:45 UTC+2	Stojkov 10'; Ivanovski 86'	Report		Stadium: Philip II Arena; Attendance: 7,000; Referee: Saïd Ennjimi (France)

12 August 2009 Friendly	Iceland	1–1	Slovakia	Reykjavík, Iceland
20:00 UTC+1	Sigurdsson 59'	Report	Vittek 36'	Stadium: Laugardalsvöllur; Attendance: 5,099; Referee: Lars Christoffersen (Denmark)

5 September 2009 2010 FIFA World Cup qualification	Iceland	1–1	Norway	Reykjavík, Iceland
18:45 UTC±0	Guðjohnsen 29'	Report	J. Riise 11'	Stadium: Laugardalsvöllur; Attendance: 7,321; Referee: Alexandru Tudor (Romania)

9 September 2009 Friendly	Iceland	3–1	Georgia	Reykjavík, Iceland
20:30 UTC+1	Jóhannsson 14'; Skúlason 18'; Gunnarsson 55'	Report	Dvalishvili 33'	Stadium: Laugardalsvöllur; Attendance: 4,726; Referee: Matteo Trefoloni (Italy)

13 October 2009 Friendly	Iceland	1–0	South Africa	Reykjavík, Iceland
19:10 UTC+1	Gunnarsson 50'	Report		Stadium: Laugardalsvöllur; Attendance: 3,253; Referee: Svein Moen (Norway)

10 November 2009 Friendly	Iran	1–0	Iceland	Tehran, Iran
18:00 UTC+3:30	Ansarifard 53'	Report		Stadium: Azadi Stadium; Attendance: 1,000; Referee: Abdullah Balideh (Qatar)

14 November 2009 Friendly	Luxembourg	1–1	Iceland	Luxembourg City, Luxembourg
18:00 UTC+1	Kintziger 75'	Report	Jóhannsson 63'	Stadium: Stade Josy Barthel; Attendance: 913; Referee: Pol van Boekel (Netherlands)

== 2010 ==
3 March 2010 Friendly	Cyprus	0–0	Iceland	Larnaca, Cyprus
19:00 UTC+2		Report		Stadium: Antonis Papadopoulos Stadium; Attendance: 500; Referee: Nikolay Yordanov (Bulgaria)

21 March 2010 Friendly	Iceland	2–0	Faroe Islands	Kópavogur, Iceland
15:00 UTC±0	Vilhjálmsson 10'; Sigþórsson 37'	Report		Stadium: Kórinn; Attendance: 312; Referee: Claus Bo Larsen (Denmark)

25 March 2010 Friendly	Mexico	0–0	Iceland	Charlotte, United States
19:00 UTC-5		Report		Stadium: Bank of America Stadium; Attendance: 63,227; Referee: Mark Geiger (United States)

29 May 2010 Friendly	Iceland	4–0	Andorra	Reykjavík, Iceland
17:00 UTC±0	Helguson 32' (pen.), 51'; Gunnarsson 87' (pen.); Sigþórsson 89'	Report		Stadium: Laugardalsvöllur; Attendance: 2,567; Referee: Petur Reinert (Faroe Islands)

11 August 2010 Friendly	Iceland	1–1	Liechtenstein	Reykjavík, Iceland
20:30 UTC±0	Rúrik Gíslason 20'	Report	Stocklasa 69'	Stadium: Laugardalsvöllur; Attendance: 3,327; Referee: Anthony Buttimer (Ireland)

3 September 2010 UEFA Euro 2012 qualifying	Iceland	1–2	Norway	Reykjavík, Iceland
19:00 UTC±0	Helguson 38'	Report	Hangeland 59'; Abdellaoue 75'	Stadium: Laugardalsvöllur; Attendance: 6,137; Referee: Luca Banti (Italy)

7 September 2010 UEFA Euro 2012 qualifying	Denmark	1–0	Iceland	Copenhagen, Denmark
20:15 UTC+2	Kahlenberg 90+1'	Report		Stadium: Parken Stadium; Attendance: 18,908; Referee: Dougie McDonald (Scotland)

12 October 2010 UEFA Euro 2012 qualifying	Iceland	1–3	Portugal	Reykjavík, Iceland
19:45 UTC±0	Helguson 17'	Report	Ronaldo 3'; Meireles 27'; Postiga 72'	Stadium: Laugardalsvöllur; Attendance: 9,767; Referee: Thomas Einwaller (Austria)

17 November 2010 Friendly	Israel	3–2	Iceland	Tel Aviv, Israel
20:35 UTC+2	Damari 5', 14'; Refaelov 27'	Report	Finnbogason 79'; Sigþórsson 85'	Stadium: Bloomfield Stadium; Attendance: 8,142; Referee: Ilias Spathas (Greece)

== 2011 ==
26 March 2011 UEFA Euro 2012 qualifying	Cyprus	0–0	Iceland	Nicosia, Cyprus
20:00 UTC+2		Report		Stadium: GSP Stadium; Attendance: 2,088; Referee: Darko Čeferin (Slovenia)

4 June 2011 UEFA Euro 2012 qualifying	Iceland	0–2	Denmark	Reykjavík, Iceland
18:45 UTC±0		Report	Schøne 60'; Eriksen 75'	Stadium: Laugardalsvöllur; Attendance: 7,629; Referee: Fırat Aydınus (Turkey)

10 August 2011 Friendly	Hungary	4–0	Iceland	Budapest, Hungary
18:45 UTC+2	Koman 32'; Rudolf 45'; Dzsudzsák 59'; Elek 88'	Report		Stadium: Szusza Ferenc Stadion; Attendance: 12,508; Referee: Wolfgang Stark (Germany)

2 September 2011 UEFA Euro 2012 qualifying	Norway	1–0	Iceland	Oslo, Norway
20:00 UTC+2	Abdellaoue 88' (pen.)	Report		Stadium: Ullevaal Stadion; Attendance: 22,381; Referee: Ovidiu Alin Hategan (Romania)

6 September 2011 UEFA Euro 2012 qualifying	Iceland	1–0	Cyprus	Reykjavík, Iceland
18:45 UTC±0	Sigþórsson 5'	Report		Stadium: Laugardalsvöllur; Attendance: 5,267; Referee: Boško Jovanetić (Serbia)

7 October 2011 UEFA Euro 2012 qualifying	Portugal	5–3	Iceland	Porto, Portugal
21:00 UTC+1	Nani 13', 21'; Postiga 45'; Moutinho 81'; Eliseu 87'	Report	Jónasson 48', 68'; G. Sigurðsson 90+3' (pen.)	Stadium: Estádio do Dragão; Attendance: 35,715; Referee: Bas Nijhuis (Netherlands)

== 2012 ==
24 February 2012 Kirin Challenge Cup	Japan	3–1	Iceland	Osaka, Japan
19:00 (UTC+9)	Maeda 2'; Fujimoto 53'; Makino 79'	Report	Smárason 90+3' (pen.)	Stadium: Osaka Nagai Stadium; Attendance: 42,579; Referee: Chris Beath (Australia)

29 February 2012 Friendly	Montenegro	2–1	Iceland	Podgorica, Montenegro
18:00 (UTC+1)	Jovetić 56', 88'	Report	Finnbogason 79'	Stadium: Podgorica City Stadium; Attendance: 5,500; Referee: Ognjen Valjić (Bosnia and Herzegovina)

27 May 2012 Friendly	France	3–2	Iceland	Valenciennes, France
21:00 (UTC+2)	Debuchy 52'; Ribéry 86'; Rami 87'	Report	Bjarnason 28'; Sigþórsson 33'	Stadium: Stade du Hainaut; Attendance: 20,580; Referee: Sébastien Delferiere (Belgium)

30 May 2012 Friendly	Sweden	3–2	Iceland	Gothenburg, Sweden
21:00 (UTC+2)	Ibrahimović 2'; Toivonen 14'; Wilhelmsson 77'	Report	Sigþórsson 27'; Jónasson 90+4'	Stadium: Gamla Ullevi; Attendance: 14,379; Referee: Peter Rasmussen (Denmark)

7 September 2012 2014 FIFA World Cup qualification	Iceland	2–0	Norway	Reykjavík, Iceland
18:45 UTC±0	Árnason 22'; Finnbogason 81'	Report		Stadium: Laugardalsvöllur; Attendance: 8,352; Referee: Anthony Gautier (France)

15 August 2012 Friendly	Iceland	2–0	Faroe Islands	Reykjavík, Iceland
20:45	Sigþórsson 30', 90'	Report		Stadium: Laugardalsvöllur; Attendance: 7,256; Referee: Laurent Kopriwa (Luxembourg)

11 September 2012 2014 FIFA World Cup qualification	Cyprus	1–0	Iceland	Larnaca, Cyprus
20:00 UTC+3	Makrides 58'	Report		Stadium: Antonis Papadopoulos Stadium; Attendance: 1,600; Referee: Sébastien Delferiere (Belgium)

12 October 2012 2014 FIFA World Cup qualification	Albania	1–2	Iceland	Tirana, Albania
19:00 UTC+2	Çani 28'	Report	Bjarnason 19'; Sigurðsson 81'	Stadium: Stadiumi Qemal Stafa; Attendance: 8,200; Referee: Tony Asumaa (Finland)

16 October 2012 2014 FIFA World Cup qualification	Iceland	0–2	Switzerland	Reykjavík, Iceland
18:30 UTC±0		Report	Barnetta 66'; Gavranović 79'	Stadium: Laugardalsvöllur; Attendance: 8,369; Referee: Alan Kelly (Republic of Ireland)

14 November 2012 Friendly	Andorra	0–2	Iceland	Aixovall, Andorra
19:00 UTC+1		Report	Guðmundsson 10'; Sigurjónsson 58'	Stadium: Camp d’Esports d’Aixovall; Attendance: 500; Referee: Ruddy Buquet (France)

== 2013 ==
6 February 2013 Friendly	Iceland	0–2	Russia	Marbella, Spain
19:30 UTC±0		Report	Shirokov 43'; Shatov 66'	Stadium: Estadio Municipal de Marbella; Attendance: 2,000; Referee: Antonio Mateu Lahoz (Spain)

22 March 2013 2014 FIFA World Cup qualification	Slovenia	1–2	Iceland	Ljubljana, Slovenia
18:00 UTC+1	Novaković 34'	Report	Sigurðsson 55', 78'	Stadium: Stožice; Attendance: 6,500; Referee: Stavros Tritsonis (Greece)

7 June 2013 2014 FIFA World Cup qualification	Iceland	2–4	Slovenia	Reykjavík, Iceland
19:00 UTC±0	Bjarnason 22'; Finnbogason 26' (pen.)	Report	Kirm 11'; Birsa 31' (pen.); Cesar 61'; Krhin 86'	Stadium: Laugardalsvöllur; Attendance: 9,202; Referee: Felix Zwayer (Germany)

14 August 2013 Friendly	Iceland	1–0	Faroe Islands	Reykjavík, Iceland
20:45 UTC+1	Sigþórsson 65'	Report		Stadium: Laugardalsvöllur; Attendance: 4,815; Referee: Tore Hansen (Norway)

6 September 2013 2014 FIFA World Cup qualification	Switzerland	4–4	Iceland	Bern, Switzerland
20:30 UTC+2	Lichtsteiner 15', 30'; Schär 27'; Džemaili 54' (pen.)	Report	Guðmundsson 3', 68', 90+1'; Sigþórsson 56'	Stadium: Stade de Suisse; Attendance: 26,000; Referee: Sergei Karasev (Russia)

10 September 2013 2014 FIFA World Cup qualification	Iceland	2–1	Albania	Reykjavík, Iceland
19:00 UTC±0	Bjarnason 13'; Sigþórsson 47'	Report	Rama 9'	Stadium: Laugardalsvöllur; Attendance: 9,768; Referee: Andre Marriner (England)

11 October 2013 2014 FIFA World Cup qualification	Iceland	2–0	Cyprus	Reykjavík, Iceland
18:45 UTC±0	Sigþórsson 60'; Sigurðsson 76'	Report		Stadium: Laugardalsvöllur; Attendance: 9,767; Referee: István Vad (Hungary)

15 October 2013 2014 FIFA World Cup qualification	Norway	1–1	Iceland	Oslo, Norway
20:00 UTC+2	Braaten 30'	Report	Sigþórsson 12'	Stadium: Ullevaal Stadion; Attendance: 6,796; Referee: Paolo Tagliavento (Italy)

15 November 2013 2014 FIFA World Cup qualification play-offs	Iceland	0–0	Croatia	Reykjavík, Iceland
19:00 UTC±0		Report		Stadium: Laugardalsvöllur; Attendance: 9,767; Referee: Alberto Undiano Mallenco (Spain)

19 November 2013 2014 FIFA World Cup qualification play-offs	Croatia	2–0 (2–0 agg.)	Iceland	Zagreb, Croatia
20:15 UTC+1	Mandžukić 27'; Srna 47'	Report		Stadium: Stadion Maksimir; Attendance: 22,612; Referee: Björn Kuipers (Netherlands)
Note: Croatia won 2–0 on aggregate and qualified for the 2014 FIFA World Cup.

== 2014 ==
21 January 2014 Friendly	Iceland	0–2	Sweden	Abu Dhabi, United Arab Emirates
20:00 UTC+3		Report	Quaison 33'; Molins 62'	Stadium: Mohammad Bin Zayed Stadium; Attendance: 100; Referee: Marai Al-Awaji (Saudi Arabia)

5 March 2014 Friendly	Wales	3–1	Iceland	Cardiff, Wales
19:45	Collins 12'; Vokes 63'; Bale 70'	Report	Williams 26' (o.g.)	Stadium: Cardiff City Stadium; Attendance: 13,290; Referee: Elmar Saar (Estonia)

30 May 2014 Friendly	Austria	1–1	Iceland	Innsbruck, Austria
19:30 UTC+2	Sabitzer 28'	Report	Sigþórsson 47'	Stadium: Tivoli Stadion Tirol; Attendance: 13,290; Referee: Matej Jug (Slovenia)

5 June 2014 Friendly	Iceland	1–0	Estonia	Reykjavík, Iceland
19:15	Sigþórsson 54' (pen.)	Report		Stadium: Laugardalsvöllur; Attendance: 5,079; Referee: Jakob Kehlet (Denmark)

9 September 2014 UEFA Euro 2016 qualifying	Iceland	3–0	Turkey	Reykjavík, Iceland
18:45 UTC±0	Böðvarsson 19'; Sigurðsson 76'; Sigþórsson 77'	Report		Stadium: Laugardalsvöllur; Attendance: 8,811; Referee: Ivan Bebek (Croatia)

10 October 2014 UEFA Euro 2016 qualifying	Latvia	0–3	Iceland	Riga, Latvia
21:45 UTC+3		Report	Sigurðsson 66'; Gunnarsson 77'; Gíslason 90'	Stadium: Skonto stadions Attendance: 6,354; Referee: Robert Schörgenhofer (Austria)

13 October 2014 UEFA Euro 2016 qualifying	Iceland	2–0	Netherlands	Reykjavík, Iceland
18:45 UTC±0	Sigurðsson 10' (pen.), 42'	Report		Stadium: Laugardalsvöllur; Attendance: 9,800; Referee: Carlos Velasco Carballo (Spain)

12 November 2014 Friendly	Belgium	3–1	Iceland	Brussels, Belgium
20:45 UTC+1	Lombaerts 11'; Origi 61'; Lukaku 73'	Report	Finnbogason 13'	Stadium: King Baudouin Stadium; Attendance: 22,163; Referee: Antony Gautier (France)

16 November 2014 UEFA Euro 2016 qualifying	Czech Republic	2–1	Iceland	Plzeň, Czech Republic
20:45 UTC+1	Kadeřábek 45'; Böðvarsson 61' (o.g.)	Report	Sigurðsson 9'	Stadium: Doosan Arena; Attendance: 11,533; Referee: Wolfgang Stark (Germany)

== 2015 ==
16 January 2015 Friendly	Canada	1–2	Iceland	Orlando, United States
16:30 UTC-5	De Rosario 70'	Report	Steindorsson 6'; Vilhjálmsson 42'	Stadium: UCF Soccer and Track Stadium; Attendance: 100; Referee: Edvin Jurisevic (United States)

19 January 2015 Friendly	Canada	1–1	Iceland	Orlando, United States
16:30 UTC-5	De Rosario 30' (pen.)	Report	Friðjónsson 65'	Stadium: UCF Soccer and Track Stadium; Attendance: 200; Referee: Jair Marrufo (United States)

28 March 2015 UEFA Euro 2016 qualifying	Kazakhstan	0–3	Iceland	Astana, Kazakhstan
21:00 UTC+6		Report	Guðjohnsen 20'; Bjarnason 32', 90'	Stadium: Astana Arena; Attendance: 13,182; Referee: Anastasios Sidiropoulos (Greece)

31 March 2015 Friendly	Estonia	1–1	Iceland	Tallinn, Estonia
19:00 UTC+3	Vassiljev 55'	Report	Gíslason 9'	Stadium: A. Le Coq Arena; Attendance: 5,334; Referee: Andris Treimanis (Latvia)

12 June 2015 UEFA Euro 2016 qualifying	Iceland	2–1	Czech Republic	Reykjavík, Iceland
18:45 UTC±0	Gunnarsson 60'; Sigþórsson 76'	Report	Dočkal 55'	Stadium: Laugardalsvöllur; Attendance: 9,767; Referee: Willie Collum (Scotland)

3 September 2015 UEFA Euro 2016 qualifying	Netherlands	0–1	Iceland	Amsterdam, Netherlands
20:45 UTC+2		Report	Sigurðsson 51' (pen.)	Stadium: Amsterdam ArenA; Attendance: 50,275; Referee: Milorad Mažić (Serbia)

6 September 2015 UEFA Euro 2016 qualifying	Iceland	0–0	Kazakhstan	Reykjavík, Iceland
18:45 UTC±0		Report		Stadium: Laugardalsvöllur; Attendance: 9,767; Referee: Yevhen Aranovsky (Ukraine)

10 October 2015 UEFA Euro 2016 qualifying	Iceland	2–2	Latvia	Reykjavík, Iceland
16:00 UTC±0	Sigþórsson 5'; Sigurðsson 27'	Report	Cauņa 49'; Šabala 68'	Stadium: Laugardalsvöllur; Attendance: 9,767; Referee: Alexei Eskov (Russia)

13 October 2015 UEFA Euro 2016 qualifying	Turkey	1–0	Iceland	Konya, Turkey
20:45 UTC+3	İnan 89'	Report		Stadium: Konya Büyükşehir Stadium; Attendance: 39,404; Referee: Gianluca Rocchi (Italy)

13 November 2015 Friendly	Poland	4–2	Iceland	Warsaw, Poland
21:45	Grosicki 52'; Kapustka 66'; Lewandowski 76', 78'	Report	Sigurðsson 4' (pen.); Finnbogason 59'	Stadium: Stadion Narodowy; Attendance: 56,207; Referee: Padraig Sutton (Ireland)

17 November 2015 Friendly	Slovakia	3–1	Iceland	Žilina, Slovakia
21:45	Mak 58', 61'; Ďuriš 84'	Report	Finnbogason 8'	Stadium: Štadión pod Dubňom; Attendance: 5,568; Referee: Pawel Raczkowski (Poland)

== 2016 ==
13 January 2016 Friendly	Finland	0–1	Iceland	Abu Dhabi, United Arab Emirates
20:00 (UTC+4)		Report	Traustason 16'	Stadium: Mohammed bin Zayed Stadium; Attendance: 50; Referee: Adel Al Naqbi (United Arab Emirates)

16 January 2016 Friendly	United Arab Emirates	2–1	Iceland	Abu Dhabi, United Arab Emirates
18:15 (UTC+4)	Al Hammadi 25'; Mabkhout 48'	Report	Kjartansson 14'	Stadium: Mohammed bin Zayed Stadium; Attendance: 500; Referee: Srđan Jovanović (Serbia)

31 January 2016 Friendly	United States	3–2	Iceland	Carson, United States
14:45 (UTC-7)	Altidore 20'; Orozco 59'; Birnbaum 90'	Report	Steindórsson 13'; Sigurðarson 48'	Stadium: Dignity Health Sports Park; Attendance: 8,803; Referee: Jeffrey Solis (Costa Rica)

24 March 2016 Friendly	Denmark	2–1	Iceland	Herning, Denmark
20:00 (UTC+1)	Jørgensen 50', 54'	Report	Traustason 90'	Stadium: MCH Arena; Attendance: 9,194; Referee: Tore Hansen (Norway)

29 March 2016 Friendly	Greece	2–3	Iceland	Piraeus, Greece
20:30 (UTC+3)	Fortounis 19', 31'	Report	Traustason 34'; Ingason 69'; Sigþórsson 82'	Stadium: Karaiskakis Stadium; Attendance: 5,592; Referee: Javier Estrada Fernández (Spain)

1 June 2016 Friendly	Norway	3–2	Iceland	Oslo, Norway
19:45 (UTC+2)	Johansen 1'; Helland 41'; Sørloth 67'	Report	Ingason 36'; G. Sigurðsson 81' (pen.)	Stadium: Ullevaal Stadion; Attendance: 9,568; Referee: Kevin Clancy (Scotland)

6 June 2016 Friendly	Iceland	4–0	Liechtenstein	Reykjavík, Iceland
20:30 (UTC+1)	Kolbeinn Sigþórsson 11'; Birkir Már Sævarsson 21'; Alfreð Finnbogason 42'; Eiður Guðjohnsen 83'	Report		Stadium: Laugardalsvöllur; Attendance: 8,401; Referee: Marcin Borski (Poland)

14 June 2016 UEFA Euro 2016 Group F	Portugal	1–1	Iceland	Saint-Étienne, France
21:00 UTC+2	Nani 31'	Report	Bjarnason 50'	Stadium: Stade Geoffroy-Guichard; Attendance: 38,742; Referee: Cüneyt Çakır (Turkey)

18 June 2016 UEFA Euro 2016 Group F	Iceland	1–1	Hungary	Marseille, France
18:00 UTC+2	Sigurðsson 40' (pen.)	Report	Sævarsson 88' (o.g.)	Stadium: Stade Vélodrome; Attendance: 60,842; Referee: Sergei Karasev (Russia)

22 June 2016 UEFA Euro 2016 Group F	Iceland	2–1	Austria	Saint-Denis, France
18:00 UTC+2	Böðvarsson 18'; Traustason 90+4'	Report	Schöpf 60'	Stadium: Stade de France; Attendance: 68,714; Referee: Szymon Marciniak (Poland)

27 June 2016 UEFA Euro 2016 Round of 16	England	1–2	Iceland	Nice, France
21:00 CEST	Rooney 4' (pen.)	Report	Sigurðsson 6'; Sigþórsson 18'	Stadium: Allianz Riviera; Attendance: 33,901; Referee: Damir Skomina (Slovenia)

3 July 2016 UEFA Euro 2016 Quarter-final	France	5–2	Iceland	Saint-Denis, France
21:00 CEST	Giroud 12', 59'; Pogba 20'; Payet 43'; Griezmann 45'	Report	Sigþórsson 56'; Bjarnason 84'	Stadium: Stade de France; Attendance: 76,833; Referee: Björn Kuipers (Netherlands)

5 September 2016 2018 FIFA World Cup qualification	Ukraine	1–1	Iceland	Kyiv, Ukraine
20:45 CEST	Yarmolenko 41'	Report	Finnbogason 5'	Stadium: Olimpiyskiy National Sports Complex; Attendance: 0 (Note: Ukraine were sanctioned by FIFA to play one home match (against Iceland on 5 September 2016) without spectators for racist behaviour in the 2014 FIFA World Cup qualifying match against San Marino at Arena Lviv, Lviv. In addition, the Football Federation of Ukraine were ordered not to play any of its 2018 FIFA World Cup qualifying matches at Arena Lviv.); Referee: Clement Turpin (France)

6 October 2016 2018 FIFA World Cup qualification	Iceland	3–2	Finland	Reykjavík, Iceland
20:45	Árnason 37'; Finnbogason 90+1'; Sigurðsson 90+6'	Report	Pukki 21'; Lod 39'	Stadium: Laugardalsvöllur; Attendance: 9,548; Referee: Svein Oddvar Moen (Norway)

9 October 2016 2018 FIFA World Cup qualification	Iceland	2–0	Turkey	Reykjavík, Iceland
20:45 (18:45 UTC±0)	Elmar Bjarnason 42'; Finnbogason 44'	Report (FIFA); Report (UEFA)		Stadium: Laugardalsvöllur; Attendance: 9,775; Referee: Mark Clattenburg (England)

12 November 2016 2018 FIFA World Cup qualification	Croatia	2–0	Iceland	Zagreb, Croatia
18:00 (18:00 UTC+1)	Brozović 15', 90+1'	Report (FIFA); Report (UEFA)		Stadium: Stadion Maksimir; Attendance: 0 (Note: Croatia were sanctioned by FIFA to play two home matches (against Turkey on 5 September 2016 and against Iceland on 12 November 2016) without spectators for two cases of discriminatory chants by fans, which occurred during friendly matches against Israel on 23 March 2016 and against Hungary on 26 March 2016, having already been sanctioned for similar incidents by FIFA and UEFA.); Referee: Gianluca Rocchi (Italy)

15 November 2016 Friendly	Malta	0–2	Iceland	Ta' Qali, Malta
19:00 (UTC+1)		Report	Traustason 47'; Ingason 75'	Stadium: Ta' Qali National Stadium; Attendance: 986; Referee: Arnold Hunter (Northern Ireland)

== 2017 ==
10 January 2017 2017 China Cup	China	0–2	Iceland	Nanning, China
20:00		Report	Finnbogason 64'; Sigurðarson 88'	Stadium: Guangxi Sports Center; Attendance: 23,876; Referee: Kim Jong-hyeok (South Korea)

15 January 2017 2017 China Cup	Iceland	0–1	Chile	Nanning, China
15:35		Report	Sagal 18'	Stadium: Guangxi Sports Center; Attendance: 26,335; Referee: Ma Ning (China)

8 February 2017 Friendly	Mexico	1–0	Iceland	Whitney, United States
20:00 (UTC-7)	Pulido 21'	Report		Stadium: Sam Boyd Stadium; Attendance: 30,617; Referee: Baldomero Toledo (United States)

24 March 2017 2018 FIFA World Cup qualification	Kosovo	1–2	Iceland	Shkodër, Albania
20:45 (20:45 UTC+1)	Nuhiu 52'	Report (FIFA); Report (UEFA)	Sigurðarson 25'; Sigurðsson 35' (pen.)	Stadium: Loro Boriçi Stadium; Attendance: 6,832; Referee: Artur Soares Dias (Portugal)

28 March 2017 Friendly	Republic of Ireland	0–1	Iceland	Dublin, Ireland
19:45 (UTC+1)		Report	Magnússon 21'	Stadium: Aviva Stadium; Attendance: 37,241; Referee: Jakob Kehlet (Denmark)

11 June 2017 2018 FIFA World Cup qualification	Iceland	1–0	Croatia	Reykjavík, Iceland
20:45 (18:45 UTC±0)	Magnússon 90'	Report (FIFA); Report (UEFA)		Stadium: Laugardalsvöllur; Attendance: 9,775; Referee: Alberto Undiano Mallenco (Spain)

2 September 2017 2018 FIFA World Cup qualification	Finland	1–0	Iceland	Tampere, Finland
18:00 (19:00 UTC+3)	Ring 8'	Report (FIFA); Report (UEFA)		Stadium: Tampere Stadium; Attendance: 15,835; Referee: Pavel Královec (Czech Republic)

5 September 2017 2018 FIFA World Cup qualification	Iceland	2–0	Ukraine	Reykjavík, Iceland
20:45 (18:45 UTC±0)	Sigurðsson 47', 66'	Report (FIFA); Report (UEFA)		Stadium: Laugardalsvöllur; Attendance: 9,769; Referee: Willie Collum (Scotland)

6 October 2017 2018 FIFA World Cup qualification	Turkey	0–3	Iceland	Eskişehir, Turkey
20:45 (21:45 UTC+3)		Report (FIFA); Report (UEFA)	Guðmundsson 32'; Bjarnason 39'; Árnason 49'	Stadium: New Eskişehir Stadium; Attendance: 30,390; Referee: Szymon Marciniak (Poland)

9 October 2017 2018 FIFA World Cup qualification	Iceland	2–0	Kosovo	Reykjavík, Iceland
20:45 (18:45 UTC±0)	Sigurðsson 40'; Guðmundsson 68'	Report (FIFA); Report (UEFA)		Stadium: Laugardalsvöllur; Attendance: 9,775; Referee: Harald Lechner (Austria)

8 November 2017 Friendly	Czech Republic	2–1	Iceland	Doha, Qatar
14:45 (UTC+3)	Souček 19'; Sýkora 65'	Report	K. Finnbogason 77'	Stadium: Abdullah bin Khalifa Stadium; Attendance: 60; Referee: Khamis Al-Kuwari (Qatar)

14 November 2017 Friendly	Qatar	1–1	Iceland	Doha, Qatar
19:30 (UTC+3)	Muntari 90+1'	Report	Kjartansson 26'	Stadium: Abdullah bin Khalifa Stadium; Attendance: 2,758; Referee: Omar Al-Yaqoubi (Oman)

== 2018 ==
11 January 2018 Friendly	Indonesia XI	0–6	Iceland	Sleman, Indonesia
18:30 UTC+7		Report	Bjarnason 30'; Finnbogason 47'; Karlsson 66'; Haraldsson 69'; Hermannsson 80'; Eyjólfsson 81'	Stadium: Maguwoharjo Stadium; Attendance: 20,000; Referee: Yudai Yamamoto (Japan)

14 January 2018 Friendly	Indonesia	1–4	Iceland	Jakarta, Indonesia
19:00 UTC+7	Armaiyn 29'	Report	Guðmundsson 45+2', 66' (pen.), 72'; Smárason 59'	Stadium: Gelora Bung Karno Main Stadium; Attendance: 36,220; Referee: Yusuke Araki (Japan)

23 March 2018 Friendly	Mexico	3–0	Iceland	Santa Clara, United States
19:00 UTC-7	Fabián 37'; Layún 64', 90+1'	Report		Stadium: Levi's Stadium; Attendance: 68.917; Referee: Armando Villarreal (United States)

27 March 2018 Friendly	Peru	3–1	Iceland	Harrison, United States
20:00 EDT (UTC−4)	Tapia 3'; Ruidíaz 58'; Farfán 75'	Report	Fjóluson 22'	Stadium: Red Bull Arena; Attendance: 25,219; Referee: Ted Unkel (United States)

2 June 2018 Friendly	Iceland	2–3	Norway	Reykjavík, Iceland
20:00 UTC+2	Finnbogason 30' (pen.); G. Sigurðsson 78'	Report	Johnsen 15'; King 80'; Sørloth 85'	Stadium: Laugardalsvöllur; Attendance: 9,147; Referee: Jonas Eriksson (Sweden)

7 June 2018 Friendly	Iceland	2–2	Ghana	Reykjavík, Iceland
20:00 (UTC±0)	Árnason 6'; Finnbogason 40'	Report	Nuhu 66'; Partey 87'	Stadium: Laugardalsvöllur; Attendance: 9,723; Referee: Bobby Madley (England)

16 June 2018 2018 FIFA World Cup Group D	Argentina	1–1	Iceland	Moscow, Russia
16:00 (UTC+3)	Agüero 19'	Report	Finnbogason 23'	Stadium: Spartak Stadium; Attendance: 44,190; Referee: Szymon Marciniak (Poland)

22 June 2018 2018 FIFA World Cup Group D	Nigeria	2–0	Iceland	Volgograd, Russia
18:00 (UTC+3)	Musa 49', 75'	Report		Stadium: Volgograd Arena; Attendance: 40,904; Referee: Matthew Conger (New Zealand)

26 June 2018 2018 FIFA World Cup Group D	Iceland	1–2	Croatia	Rostov-on-Don, Russia
21:00 (UTC+3)	Sigurðsson 76' (pen.)	Report	Badelj 53'; Perišić 90'	Stadium: Rostov Arena; Attendance: 43,472; Referee: Antonio Mateu Lahoz (Spain)

8 September 2018 2018–19 Nations League	Switzerland	6–0	Iceland	St. Gallen, Switzerland
18:00 (UTC+2)	Zuber 13'; Zakaria 23'; Shaqiri 53'; Seferović 67'; Ajeti 71'; Mehmedi 82'	Report		Stadium: Kybunpark; Attendance: 14,912; Referee: Michael Oliver (England)

11 September 2018 2018–19 Nations League	Iceland	0–3	Belgium	Reykjavík, Iceland
20:45 (UTC+2)		Report	Hazard 29' (pen.); Lukaku 31', 81'	Stadium: Laugardalsvöllur; Attendance: 9,710; Referee: Sergei Karasev (Russia)

11 October 2018 Friendly	France	2–2	Iceland	Guingamp, France
21:00 CEST (UTC+2)	Hólmar 86' (o.g.); Mbappé 90' (pen.)	Report (FFF)	Birkir 30'; Kári 58'	Stadium: Stade de Roudourou; Attendance: 18,000; Referee: Tiago Martins (Portugal)

15 October 2018 2018–19 Nations League	Iceland	1–2	Switzerland	Reykjavík, Iceland
20:45 CEST (UTC+2)	Finnbogason 81'	Report	Seferović 52'; Lang 67'	Stadium: Laugardalsvöllur; Attendance: 8,663; Referee: Andreas Ekberg (Sweden)

15 November 2018 2018–19 Nations League	Belgium	2–0	Iceland	Brussels, Belgium
20:45 CET (UTC+1)	Batshuayi 65', 81'	Report		Stadium: King Baudouin Stadium; Attendance: 28,891; Referee: Orel Grinfeld (Israel)

19 November 2018 Friendly	Qatar	2–2	Iceland	Eupen, Belgium
19:30 UTC+1	Al-Haydos 3'; Khoukhi 68'	Report	Al Sheeb 29' (o.g.); Sigþórsson 56' (pen.)	Stadium: Kehrwegstadion; Attendance: 2,830; Referee: Pol van Boekel (Netherlands)

== 2019 ==
11 January 2019 Friendly	Sweden	2–2	Iceland	Doha, Qatar
19:45 UTC+3	Gyökeres 47'; Thern 66'	Report	Karlsson 6'; Þorsteinsson 90+3'	Stadium: Khalifa International Stadium; Attendance: 187; Referee: Mohammed Al-Shammari (Qatar)

15 January 2019 Friendly	Iceland	0–0	Estonia	Doha, Qatar
19:45 (UTC+3)		Report		Stadium: Jassim Bin Hamad Stadium; Attendance: 210; Referee: Abdulla Ali Al-Marri (Qatar)

22 March 2019 UEFA Euro 2020 qualifying	Andorra	0–2	Iceland	Andorra la Vella, Andorra
20:45 (UTC+1)		Report	Bjarnason 22'; Kjartansson 80'	Stadium: Estadi Nacional; Attendance: 1,854; Referee: Sandro Schärer (Switzerland)

25 March 2019 UEFA Euro 2020 qualifying	France	4–0	Iceland	Saint-Denis, France
20:45 (UTC+1)	Umtiti 12'; Giroud 68'; Mbappé 78'; Griezmann 84'	Report		Stadium: Stade de France; Attendance: 65,000; Referee: István Kovács (Romania)

8 June 2019 UEFA Euro 2020 qualifying	Iceland	1–0	Albania	Reykjavík, Iceland
13:00 (UTC±0)	Guðmundsson 22'	Report		Stadium: Laugardalsvöllur; Attendance: 8,968; Referee: Bobby Madden (Scotland)

11 June 2019 UEFA Euro 2020 qualifying	Iceland	2–1	Turkey	Reykjavík, Iceland
18:45 (UTC±0)	Sigurðsson 21', 31'	Report	Toköz 40'	Stadium: Laugardalsvöllur; Attendance: 9,680; Referee: Szymon Marciniak (Poland)

7 September 2019 UEFA Euro 2020 qualifying	Iceland	3–0	Moldova	Reykjavík, Iceland
16:00 (UTC±0)	Sigþórsson 31'; Bjarnason 55'; Böðvarsson 77'	Report		Stadium: Laugardalsvöllur; Attendance: 8,338; Referee: João Pinheiro (Portugal)

10 September 2019 UEFA Euro 2020 qualifying	Albania	4–2	Iceland	Elbasan, Albania
20:45 (UTC+2)	Dermaku 32'; Elseid Hysaj 52'; Roshi 79'; Cikalleshi 83'	Report	Sigurðsson 47'; Sigþórsson 58'	Stadium: Elbasan Arena; Attendance: 8,652; Referee: Ivan Kružliak (Slovakia)

11 October 2019 UEFA Euro 2020 qualifying	Iceland	0–1	France	Reykjavík, Iceland
18:45 (UTC±0)		Report	Giroud 66' (pen.)	Stadium: Laugardalsvöllur; Attendance: 9,719; Referee: Gianluca Rocchi (Italy)

14 October 2019 UEFA Euro 2020 qualifying	Iceland	2–0	Andorra	Reykjavík, Iceland
18:45 (UTC±0)	Sigurðsson 38'; Sigþórsson 65'	Report		Stadium: Laugardalsvöllur; Attendance: 7,169; Referee: Tamás Bognár (Hungary)

14 November 2019 UEFA Euro 2020 qualifying	Turkey	0–0	Iceland	Istanbul, Turkey
20:00 (UTC+3)		Report		Stadium: Türk Telekom Stadium; Attendance: 48,329; Referee: Anthony Taylor (England)

17 November 2019 UEFA Euro 2020 qualifying	Moldova	1–2	Iceland	Chișinău, Moldova
21:45 (UTC+2)	Milinceanu 56'	Report	Bjarnason 17'; Sigurðsson 65'	Stadium: Zimbru Stadium; Attendance: 6,742; Referee: Pavel Královec (Czech Republic)
