= 1985 in Luxembourg =

- Decades: 1960s; 1970s; 1980s; 1990s; 2000s
- See also: History of Luxembourg; List of years in Luxembourg

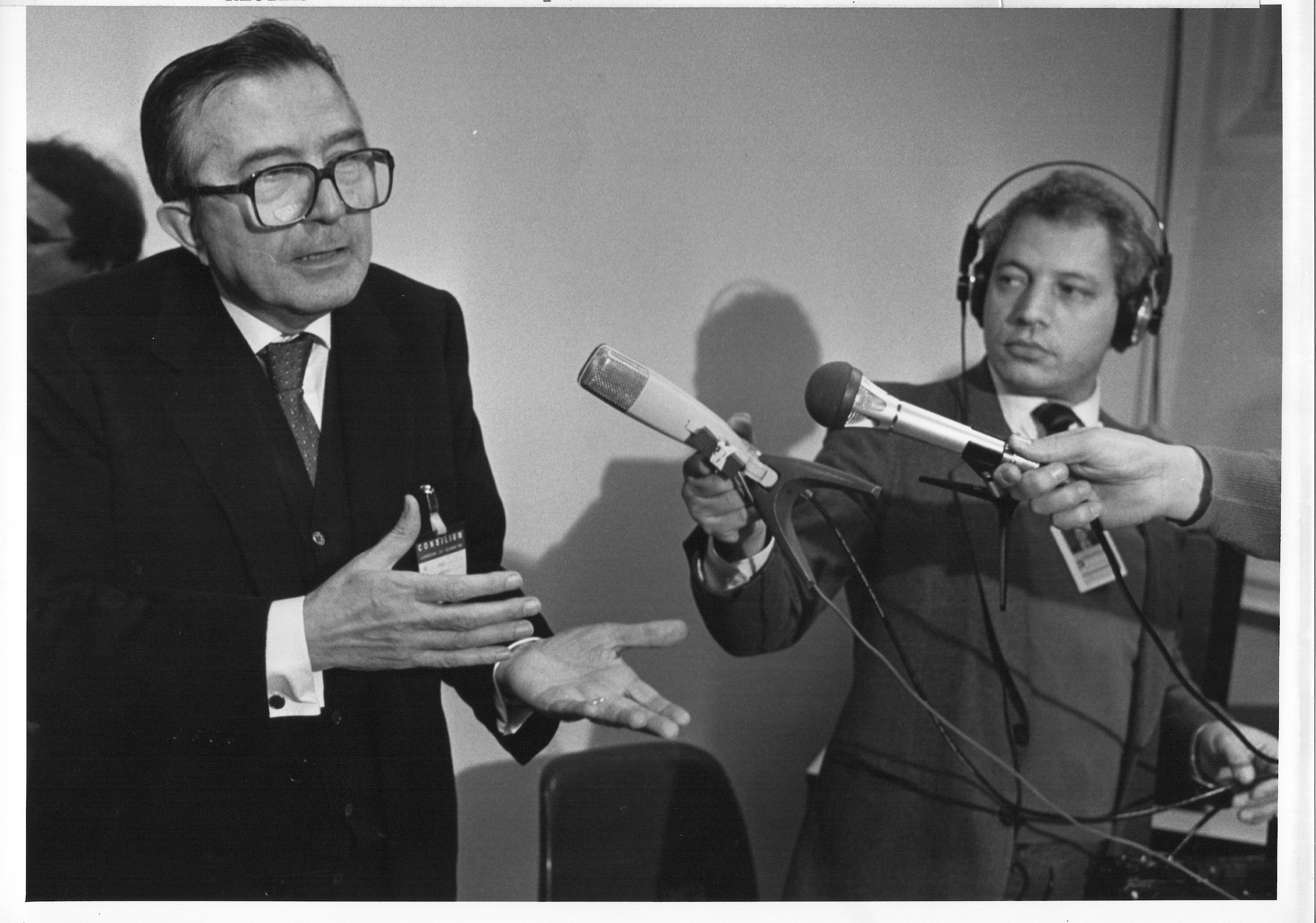
Italian Foreign Minister Giulio Andreotti speaking to journalists at the European Community meeting in Luxembourg in December 1985

The following lists events that happened during 1985 in the Grand Duchy of Luxembourg.

== Incumbents ==
Position	Incumbent
Grand Duke	Jean
Prime Minister	Jacques Santer
Deputy Prime Minister	Jacques Poos
President of the Chamber of Deputies	Léon Bollendorff
President of the Council of State	François Goerens
Mayor of Luxembourg City	Lydie Polfer

== Events ==
=== January – March ===
- 4 January – Luxembourger Gaston Thorn's term as President of the European Commission comes to an end.
- 1 March – SES is established as Europe's first commercial satellite operator.

=== April – June ===
- 5 April – A fire erupts at Notre-Dame Cathedral, in Luxembourg City, destroying the belfry and damaging the roof of the nave.
- 24 April – Representing Luxembourg, Ireen Sheer, Margo, Franck Olivier, Chris & Malcolm Roberts, and Diane Solomon finish thirteenth in the Eurovision Song Contest 1985 with the song Children, Kinder, Enfants.
- 15 May – Pope John Paul II arrives in Luxembourg for a two-day visit.
- 1 June – Paul Philipp is appointed head coach of the Luxembourg national football team.
- 14 June – The Schengen Agreement is signed at Schengen, in south-eastern Luxembourg, with the intention of removing border controls between signatory states.

=== July – September ===
- 1 July - Luxembourg assumes the rotating Presidency of the Council of the European Union for the following six months.

=== October – December ===
- 17 October – Reconstruction work is completed on Notre-Dame Cathedral, after fire damaged the cathedral on 5 April.

== Births ==
- 16 June – Andy Schleck, cyclist

== Deaths ==
- 24 April – François Neuens, cyclist
- 9 July – Charlotte, Grand Duchess of Luxembourg
- 8 November – Nicolas Frantz, cyclist
