= 1978 in Luxembourg =

- Decades: 1950s; 1960s; 1970s; 1980s; 1990s
- See also: History of Luxembourg; List of years in Luxembourg

The following lists events that happened during 1978 in the Grand Duchy of Luxembourg.

== Incumbents ==
Position	Incumbent
Grand Duke	Jean
Prime Minister	Gaston Thorn
Deputy Prime Minister	Bernard Berg
President of the Chamber of Deputies	René Van Den Bulcke
President of the Council of State	Ferdinand Wirtgen (until 1 October); Roger Maul (from 1 October)
Mayor of Luxembourg City	Colette Flesch

== Events ==
=== January – March ===
- 1 January – The communes of Asselborn, Boevange, Hachiville, and Oberwampach are merged to form the new commune of Wincrange.

=== April – June ===
- 12 April – Louis Pilot is appointed the Luxembourg national football team's new coach.
- 22 April – Representing Luxembourg, Baccara finishes seventh in the Eurovision Song Contest 1978 with the song Parlez-vous français?.
- 11 June – Belgium's Ludo Peeters wins the 1978 Tour de Luxembourg.

=== October – December ===
- 1 October – Roger Maul is appointed President of the Council of State to replace Ferdinand Wirtgen.
- 15 November – Abortion is legalised.
- 5 December – Divorce by determined cause is permitted.
- 23 December – Charles Reiffers is appointed to the Council of State.

=== Unknown ===
- General Motors shuts down operations at its factory in Bascharage.
- FC Progrès Niedercorn wins the 1977-78 National Division title.

== Births ==
- 8 May - Patrick Galbats, photographer
- 3 July – Kim Kirchen, cyclist
- 9 September – Alvin Jones, basketball player
- 29 October – Alwin de Prins, swimmer

== Deaths ==
- 12 March – Léon Lommel, clergyman
- 15 March – Arthur Useldinger, politician
- 29 March – Eugène Schaus, politician
- 3 November - Edouard Kutter, photographer
