= 1987 in Luxembourg =

- Decades: 1960s; 1970s; 1980s; 1990s; 2000s
- See also: History of Luxembourg; List of years in Luxembourg

The following lists events that happened during 1987 in the Grand Duchy of Luxembourg.

== Incumbents ==
Position	Incumbent
Grand Duke	Jean
Prime Minister	Jacques Santer
Deputy Prime Minister	Jacques Poos
President of the Chamber of Deputies	Léon Bollendorff
President of the Council of State	François Goerens (until 2 August); Ernest Arendt (from 6 August)
Mayor of Luxembourg City	Lydie Polfer

== Events ==
- 28 March – A large rally is held in Luxembourg City to protest pension disparity, leading to the founding on 12 May of the Action Committee 5/6 Pensions for Everyone.
- 9 May – Representing Luxembourg, Plastic Bertrand finishes third in the Eurovision Song Contest 1987 with the song Amour Amour.
- 27 May – Prince Jean marries Helene Vestur.

== Births ==
- April 2 – Kim Kintziger, international footballer
- April 24 – Anne Bourg, footballer

== Deaths ==
- 12 February – Raymond Vouel, politician
- October – Ketty Thull, writer
