= 1983 in Luxembourg =

- Decades: 1960s; 1970s; 1980s; 1990s; 2000s
- See also: History of Luxembourg; List of years in Luxembourg

The following lists events that happened during 1983 in the Grand Duchy of Luxembourg.

== Incumbents ==
Position	Incumbent
Grand Duke	Jean
Prime Minister	Pierre Werner
Deputy Prime Minister	Colette Flesch
President of the Chamber of Deputies	Léon Bollendorff
President of the Council of State	François Goerens
Mayor of Luxembourg City	Lydie Polfer

== Events ==
=== January – March ===
- 10 February – The European Court of Justice rejects Luxembourg's appeal against the European Parliament passing a resolution to review the seat of the Secretariat being in Luxembourg City.

=== April – June ===
- 23 April – Representing Luxembourg, Corinne Hermès wins the Eurovision Song Contest 1983 with the song Si la vie est cadeau. This victory equals France's record tally of five, although this has since been surpassed by the Republic of Ireland in 1994.
- 23 June – The Greens are founded.
- 30 June – Laws are passed to restructure the steel industry that enter into force the next day.

=== July – September ===
- 1 July – The Luxembourgian Monetary Institute is founded to issue coinage and notes in place of the government.
- 21 September – King Carl Gustaf and Queen Silvia of Sweden make an official state visit to Luxembourg.

=== October – December ===
- 1 November – Luxembourg signs the Bonn Convention, becoming the joint-first country to do so.
- 16 November – English football fans riot in Luxembourg City, leading to fifty arrests, after a match against Luxembourg.

== Births ==
- 9 May – Gilles Müller, tennis player
- 3 June – Elizabeth May, athlete

== Deaths ==
- 22 September – Antoine Krier, politician
- 25 September - Will Kesseler, painter
- 24 October – René Biver, cyclist
