= 1979 in Luxembourg =

- Decades: 1950s; 1960s; 1970s; 1980s; 1990s
- See also: History of Luxembourg; List of years in Luxembourg

The following lists events that happened during 1979 in the Grand Duchy of Luxembourg.

== Incumbents ==
Position	Incumbent
Grand Duke	Jean
Prime Minister	Gaston Thorn (until 16 July); Pierre Werner (from 16 July)
Deputy Prime Minister	Bernard Berg (until 16 July); Gaston Thorn (from 16 July)
President of the Chamber of Deputies	René Van Den Bulcke; Léon Bollendorff
President of the Council of State	Roger Maul (until 16 September); Alex Bonn (from 21 September)
Mayor of Luxembourg City	Colette Flesch

== Events ==
=== January – March ===
- 1 January – The communes of Arsdorf, Bigonville, Folschette, and Perlé are merged to form the new commune of Rambrouch.
- 1 January – The communes of Harlange and Mecher are merged to form the new commune of Lac de la Haute-Sûre.
- 1 January – The commune of Rodenbourg is merged into the commune of Junglinster.
- 30 January – Cargolux receives delivery of its first Boeing 747-200, becoming the first European cargo-only airline to operate a Jumbo Jet.
- 19 March – The government, steel companies, and trade unions reach an agreement on restructuring the steel industry.
- 31 March – Representing Luxembourg, Jeane Manson finishes thirteenth in the Eurovision Song Contest 1979 with the song J'ai déjà vu ça dans tes yeux.

=== April – June ===
- 9 May - Monsanto Company closes its production facility at Echternach after 13 years of operation, with the loss of 750 jobs.
- 9 June – Native Luxembourger Lucien Didier wins the 1979 Tour de Luxembourg.
- 10 June – Legislative and European elections are held. In the Chamber of Deputies, the CSV win another six seats, with all three left wing parties losing three deputies each.

=== July – September ===
- 16 July – After the elections of 10 June, Pierre Werner forms a new government as Prime Minister, with his predecessor Gaston Thorn as his Deputy Prime Minister.

=== October – December ===
- 3 December – Ministers from France, Germany, and Luxembourg meet in Bonn. Germany and Luxembourg protest against France's plans to allow the construction of a nuclear power plant at Cattenom, but in vain.

== Births ==
- 2 July – Claudine Muno, journalist and musician
- 11 December - Jean Muller, pianist

== Deaths ==
- 3 January - Gilbert Dussier, footballer
- 29 January – René Deltgen, actor
- 11 April - Marguerite Thomas-Clement, politician
- 28 December – Paul Wilwertz, politician
