= 1991 in Luxembourg =

- Decades: 1970s; 1980s; 1990s; 2000s; 2010s
- See also: History of Luxembourg; List of years in Luxembourg

The following lists events that happened during 1991 in the Grand Duchy of Luxembourg.

== Incumbents ==
Position	Incumbent
Grand Duke	Jean
Prime Minister	Jacques Santer
Deputy Prime Minister	Jacques Poos
President of the Chamber of Deputies	Erna Hennicot-Schoepges
President of the Council of State	Georges Thorn (until 30 October); Jean Dupong (from 1 November)
Mayor of Luxembourg City	Lydie Polfer

== Events ==
=== January – March ===
- 1 January – Luxembourg assumes the rotating Presidency of the Council of the European Union for the following six months.
- 2 February – Fernand Franck is ordained as the new Archbishop of Luxembourg.
- 2 March – SES launches its second satellite, Astra 1B.
- 25 March – The commune of Berg is renamed 'Colmar-Berg'.

=== April – June ===
- 4 May – Representing Luxembourg, Sarah Bray finishes fourteenth in the Eurovision Song Contest 1991 with the song Un baiser volé.
- 16 June – The Netherlands' Gert-Jan Theunisse wins the 1991 Tour de Luxembourg.
- 28–29 June – Luxembourg hosts its meeting of the European Council, at which the draft Treaty of Maastricht is considered.

=== July – September ===
- 27 July – Rights to freedom of expression traditionally associated with print media are explicitly guaranteed with regard to electronic media.

=== October – December ===
- October – RTL broadcasts the first ever daily news programme in Luxembourgish.
- 1 November – Jean Dupong is appointed President of the Council of State.

== Births ==
- 16 February – Princess Alexandra of Luxembourg

== Deaths ==
- 18 June – Tony Bourg, writer
- 10 October – Adrien Ries, economist
- 21 December – Jempi Kemmer, composer
