= 1984 in Luxembourg =

- Decades: 1960s; 1970s; 1980s; 1990s; 2000s
- See also: History of Luxembourg; List of years in Luxembourg

The following lists events that happened during 1984 in the Grand Duchy of Luxembourg.

== Incumbents ==
Position	Incumbent
Grand Duke	Jean
Prime Minister	Pierre Werner (until 20 July); Jacques Santer (from 20 July)
Deputy Prime Minister	Colette Flesch (until 20 July); Jacques Poos (from 20 July)
President of the Chamber of Deputies	Léon Bollendorff
President of the Council of State	François Goerens
Mayor of Luxembourg City	Lydie Polfer

== Events ==
=== January – March ===
- 8 February - American Vice President George H. W. Bush begins a two-day official visit to Luxembourg.
- 24 February – Luxembourgish is declared to be the 'national language' of Luxembourg, and one of the three official languages, alongside French and German.

=== April – June ===
- 5 May – Luxembourg City hosts the Eurovision Song Contest 1984 after Corinne Hermès's victory the previous year. Representing Luxembourg, Sophie Carle finishes tenth with the song 100% d'amour.
- 17 June – Legislative and European elections are held. The LSAP increases its representation in the Chamber of Deputies by half.

=== July – September ===
- 20 July – Pierre Werner resigns his position as Prime Minister to retire from politics. Jacques Santer forms a new government, with Jacques Poos as his deputy.

=== October – December ===
- 18 October - Luxembourger Marcel Mart becomes President of the European Court of Auditors.
- 24 December - A law is passed creating a new system of automatically indexing wages and benefits to inflation.

== Births ==
- 3 June – Prince Félix of Luxembourg
- 15 August - Sascha Palgen, gymnast
- 30 August – Jeff Henckels, archer
- 3 September – David Fiegen, athlete

== Deaths ==
- 29 June – Victor Bodson, 82, politician, President of the Chamber of Deputies (1964-1967), European Commissioner for Transport (1967-1970).
- 29 August – Camille Ney, 65, politician, Minister for Agriculture (1972-1974; 1979-1982).
