= 1990 in Luxembourg =

- Decades: 1970s; 1980s; 1990s; 2000s; 2010s
- See also: History of Luxembourg; List of years in Luxembourg

The following lists events that happened during 1990 in the Grand Duchy of Luxembourg.

== Incumbents ==
Position	Incumbent
Grand Duke	Jean
Prime Minister	Jacques Santer
Deputy Prime Minister	Jacques Poos
President of the Chamber of Deputies	Erna Hennicot-Schoepges
President of the Council of State	Georges Thorn
Mayor of Luxembourg City	Lydie Polfer

== Events ==
- 29 April – A memorial to Grand Duchess Charlotte is opened in Luxembourg City.
- 5 May – Representing Luxembourg, Celine Carzo finishes thirteenth in the Eurovision Song Contest 1990 with the song Quand je te rêve.
- 7 December – Cargolux orders six Boeing 747-400s.
- Unknown – France's Christophe Lavainne wins the 1990 Tour de Luxembourg.

== Births ==
- 17 November – Prince Wenceslas of Nassau

== Deaths ==
- 1 August – Robert Krieps, politician
- 10 October – René Urbany, politician and journalist
- 4 November – Henry Cravatte, politician
