= 1988 in Luxembourg =

- Decades: 1960s; 1970s; 1980s; 1990s; 2000s
- See also: History of Luxembourg; List of years in Luxembourg

The following lists events that happened during 1988 in the Grand Duchy of Luxembourg.

== Incumbents ==
Position	Incumbent
Grand Duke	Jean
Prime Minister	Jacques Santer
Deputy Prime Minister	Jacques Poos
President of the Chamber of Deputies	Léon Bollendorff
President of the Council of State	Ernest Arendt (until 6 August); Georges Thorn (from 6 August)
Mayor of Luxembourg City	Lydie Polfer

== Events ==
=== April – June ===
- 30 April – Representing Luxembourg, Lara Fabian finishes fourth in the Eurovision Song Contest 1988 with the song Croire.
- 18 June – The Saint Esprit Tunnel in Luxembourg City is officially opened.

=== July – September ===
- 15 July – Jacques Poos is made Minister for Health.

=== October – December ===
- 5 December – Grand Duke Jean and King Baudouin of Belgium open the A6 motorway, which connects Luxembourg to the Belgian A4 and on to Brussels.
- 11 December – SES launches its first satellite, Astra 1A, from the Centre Spatial Guyanais, in French Guiana.

== Births ==
- 25 February – Chris Sagramola, footballer
- 22 July – Prince Constantin of Nassau
- 5 August – Fleur Maxwell, figure skater

== Deaths ==
- 7 April – Lydie Schmit, politician
