= Haut =

Haut may refer to:

- Haut (newspaper), a newspaper published in Luxembourg
- Walter Haut (1922–2005), American airman who played a role in the Roswell UFO incident

== See also ==
- Haute (disambiguation)
- Die Haut, a German band
