= 1992 in Luxembourg =

- Decades: 1970s; 1980s; 1990s; 2000s; 2010s
- See also: History of Luxembourg; List of years in Luxembourg

The following lists events that happened during 1992 in the Grand Duchy of Luxembourg.

== Incumbents ==
Position	Incumbent
Grand Duke	Jean
Prime Minister	Jacques Santer
Deputy Prime Minister	Jacques Poos
President of the Chamber of Deputies	Erna Hennicot-Schoepges
President of the Council of State	Jean Dupong
Mayor of Luxembourg City	Lydie Polfer

== Events ==
=== January – March ===
- 1 January – Radio Luxembourg shuts down its English language terrestrial signal on 208 MW.
- 7 February – The Maastricht Treaty is signed.
- 16 February – Marc Girardelli wins the silver medal in the men's Super G at the 1992 Winter Olympics.
- 18 February – Girardelli wins another Olympic silver medal, this time in the men's Giant Slalom.

=== April – June ===
- 13 March – Carole Reding wins Miss Luxembourg.
- 9 April – ARBED acquires the former East German Maxhütte, which it is to reconstitute as Stahlwerk Thüringen.
- 9 May – Representing Luxembourg, Marion Welter finishes twenty-first in the Eurovision Song Contest 1992 with the song Sou frai.
- 12 June – Luxembourg signs the United Nations Framework Convention on Climate Change in Rio de Janeiro.
- 14 June – France's Jean-Philippe Dojwa wins the 1992 Tour de Luxembourg.

=== July – September ===
- 10 August – P&TLuxembourg is created as a government-owned corporation.

=== October – December ===
- 22 November – The Action Committee 5/6 changes its name to 'Action Committee for Democracy and Pensions Justice'.
- 9 December – René Steichen resigns from the cabinet, and is replaced by Marie-Josée Jacobs.
- 12 December – At a Council of Ministers meeting in Edinburgh, it is decided that Luxembourg City will remain one of the three seats of the European Union.
- 30 December – Radio Luxembourg shuts down its English language satellite signal, putting an end to its English coverage.

== Births ==
- 16 April – Prince Sébastien of Luxembourg
- 9 May - Tom Laterza, footballer
- 1 August – Prince Carl-Johan of Nassau
- 22 September - Bob Jungels, road bicycle racer

== Deaths ==
- 27 February – Antoine Wehenkel, politician
- 7 July – Josy Barthel, athlete and politician
