= 1986 in Luxembourg =

- Decades: 1960s; 1970s; 1980s; 1990s; 2000s
- See also: History of Luxembourg; List of years in Luxembourg

The following lists events that happened during 1986 in the Grand Duchy of Luxembourg.

== Incumbents ==
Position	Incumbent
Grand Duke	Jean
Prime Minister	Jacques Santer
Deputy Prime Minister	Jacques Poos
President of the Chamber of Deputies	Léon Bollendorff
President of the Council of State	François Goerens
Mayor of Luxembourg City	Lydie Polfer

== Events ==
=== January–March ===
- 17 February – The Single European Act is signed in The Hague.

=== April–June ===
- 3 May – Representing Luxembourg, Sherisse Laurence finishes third in the Eurovision Song Contest 1986 with the song Sherisse Laurence.
- 8 May – The Karlspreis is awarded to the people of Luxembourg for Luxembourg's commitment to European integration. Grand Duke Jean collects it on the people's behalf.
- 9–12 June – Grand Duke Jean and Grand Duchess Josephine-Charlotte make a state visit to Iceland.

=== July–September ===
- 26 September – Prince Jean renounces the right of succession for himself and his descendants.

== Births ==
- 3 August – Prince Louis of Luxembourg
- 8 December – Princess Marie-Gabrielle of Nassau
