= Patrick Galbats =

Luxembourgish artist (born 1978)

Patrick Galbats (born 1978) is a Luxembourgish freelance photographer and photojournalist who has completed a number of artistically presented reportages.

== Biography ==
Galbats completed his schooling at the Lycée Technique des Arts et Métiers in Luxembourg City. After studying at the Ecole Septante-Supérieure de l'Image: Le 75 in Brussels, he joined the young photographers' collective photon.lu. From 2002 to 2006, he worked for the Luxembourg weekly magazine Revue. Since 2007, he has been a freelance photographer.

In 2001, Galbats took a series of photographs at Luxembourg's Centre Pénitentiaire. In 2003, he completed an assignment on street people and drug addicts which was exhibited at the main railway station. In 2004, the National Audiovisual Centre published his work DOïNA, a collection he created during three trips to Romania (2001–2003). In 2004, he presented the reportage Un autre regard sur Haïti for Objectif Tiers Monde which reveals the conditions in Haiti after the departure of Jean Bertrand Aristide.
