= Diane Solomon =

American singer

Diane Solomon is an American singer, songwriter and nutritionist, who was part of the group who represented Luxembourg in the Eurovision Song Contest 1985, in which they sang "Children, Kinder, Enfants". They received 37 points and finished in thirteenth place.

== Biography ==
After gaining a BSC at the University of Oregon, majoring in communications and theatre arts, she arrived in the United Kingdom in the early 1970s, intending to enter the Royal Academy of Dramatic Arts. But before she was able to, she was "discovered" by a BBC executive (John R King) playing her guitar and singing country and folk songs at a private New Year's party in London. Following a successful screen test, she was awarded her own television programme, The Diane Solomon Show, on BBC One. The first was an hour long special filled with songs and interviews, which aired on December 24, 1974, with guests including Demis Roussos, Spike Milligan and Arthur Negus. Such was her profile at the time, on Christmas Day 1975, Solomon starred in the much heralded Morecambe & Wise Christmas Show followed the next day by her own BBCTV Christmas Show, both shown on BBC1. Her 1975 album, Take Two, reached No. 26 in the UK Albums Chart.

She is now resident in New Hampshire, United States, and still sings and writes, as well as practising in the fields of nutrition and homeopathy.

== Discography ==
- 1974: The Diane Solomon Showcase
- 1975: Take Two
- 1976: Mixed Feelings

=== Take Two ===
Take Two

Studio album by Diane Solomon
- Released: 1975
- Genre: Pop
- Label: Philips
- Producer: John King

Diane Solomon chronology
The Diane Solomon Showcase (1974)	''Take Two'' (1975)	Mixed Feelings (1976)

Take Two is the second album by American singer, songwriter and nutritionist Diane Solomon released in 1975 on the Philips label. Take Two reached No. 26 in the UK Albums Chart.

==== Track listing ====
Side One

1. "Annie's Song" (John Denver)
2. "Sunshine Superman" (Leitch)
3. "(Listen To The Falling) Rain" (J. & H. Feliciano)
4. "Time" (Cosma/Eve King)
5. "Forbidden Fruit" (Oscar Brown Jnr.)
6. "It's Impossible" (Manzanero/Wayne)

Side Two

1. "Highway Affair" (Edelman)
2. "Love Story" (Lai/Sigman)
3. "Son Of A Preacher Man" (John Hurley/Ronnie Wilkins)
4. "Down And Round" (Livsey)
5. "Travelling Salesman" (Sklerov/Lloyd)
6. "Love Me For A Reason" (Bristol/Brown/James)
7. "Light A Candle" (Edelman)

==== Production ====
- Album co-ordinator - John Velascoe
- Lead guitar overdubs - Big Jim Sullivan
- Recorded at De Lane Lea Studios
- Musical Director - Ed Welch
- Producer - John King
