= Jean-Pierre Kemmer =

Jean-Pierre (Jempi) Kemmer (8 December 1923 – 21 December 1991) was a Luxembourgish composer and conductor.

A percussionist, pianist, and choir master, he was a member of the RTL Symphony Orchestra. He composed choir works, symphonies, operettas, film music and concertos. In 1969, he founded the Choeurs de Jean-Pierre Kemmer.

== Compositions ==
- "Promendade à Grunewald" (1953)
- "Dimanche matin à Luxembourg" (1954)
- "Concerto pour trompette et orchestre" (1960)
- "Symphonie des morts" (1963)
- "Le chant des saisons" (1966)
- "Messe de jazz" (1975)
- "The Funny Horn" (1976)
- "Passio secundum Iohannem" (1976)

He also composed the music for three operettas:

- An enger Summernuecht
- D'Vakanz am Mëllerdall
- Ënner bloem Himmel

Many of his compositions are available on the following set of four CDs:

- "Jean-Pierre Kemmer - Komponist, Dirigent a Pianist 1923-1991", Centre National de l'Audiovisuel (CNA), Luxembourg, 2004.
