= Camille Polfer =

Luxembourgish politician (1924–1983)

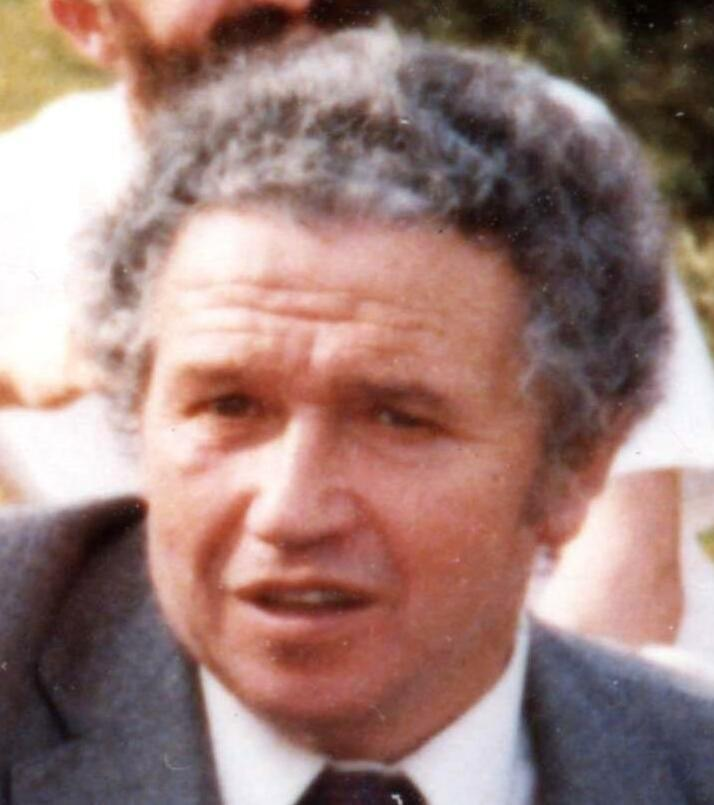
Polfer in 1982.

Camille Polfer (21 November 1924 – 19 March 1983) was a Luxembourgish politician and teacher.

Born in Namur, in southern Belgium, to Luxembourgish parents, Polfer received his primary education in France, and his secondary education in Echternach, in Luxembourg. He studied at the University of Nancy, qualifying as a sports teacher. He taught at the Lycée de Garçons Esch-sur-Alzette from 1950 until 1959. He transferred to the Lycée de Garçons Luxembourg, in Limpertsberg, where he remained until 1969, when he replaced René Van Den Bulcke as sports commissioner.

Polfer entered the communal council of Luxembourg City as a Democratic Party councillor in 1969. He served as an échevin, before becoming Mayor of Luxembourg City in 1980. He was instrumental in the development of the Kockelscheuer Sport Centre. However, due to his declining health, Polfer was forced to step down after two years in office. He was replaced as the city's mayor by his daughter, Lydie, who continued in the position until 1999. Lydie has gone on to be one of the most important Luxembourgish politicians, serving as Deputy Prime Minister and Minister for Foreign Affairs (1999–2004).

Polfer died the year after his departure from office, at the age of 58.

His name is borne by Stade Camille Polfer in South Bonnevoie and rue Camille Polfer, in Cents.

Political offices
Preceded by Colette Flesch	Mayor of Luxembourg City; 1980–1981	Succeeded by Lydie Polfer
