= Lycée de Garçons Esch-sur-Alzette =

Location
- Esch-sur-Alzette; Luxembourg
- Coordinates: 49°29′58″N 05°59′01″E

Information
- Type: Classical secondary school
- Established: 1901
- Enrollment: 1243
- Website: http://www.lge.lu

Lycée de Garçons Esch-sur-Alzette (English: Esch-sur-Alzette High School for Boys), abbreviated to LGE, is a high school in Esch-sur-Alzette, in south-western Luxembourg. Despite the name, the LGE is not an all-boys school, but open to women since 1969.

At the heart of the school is the original neo-classical building, built in 1909. This was first augmented in 1957, and the school underwent a rapid expansion in the 1960s and 1970s.

It got visited by US Ambassador Thomas Barrett in 2022.

== Notable alumni ==
Luc Frieden - Prime Minister of Luxembourg (since 2023)

== Footnotes ==
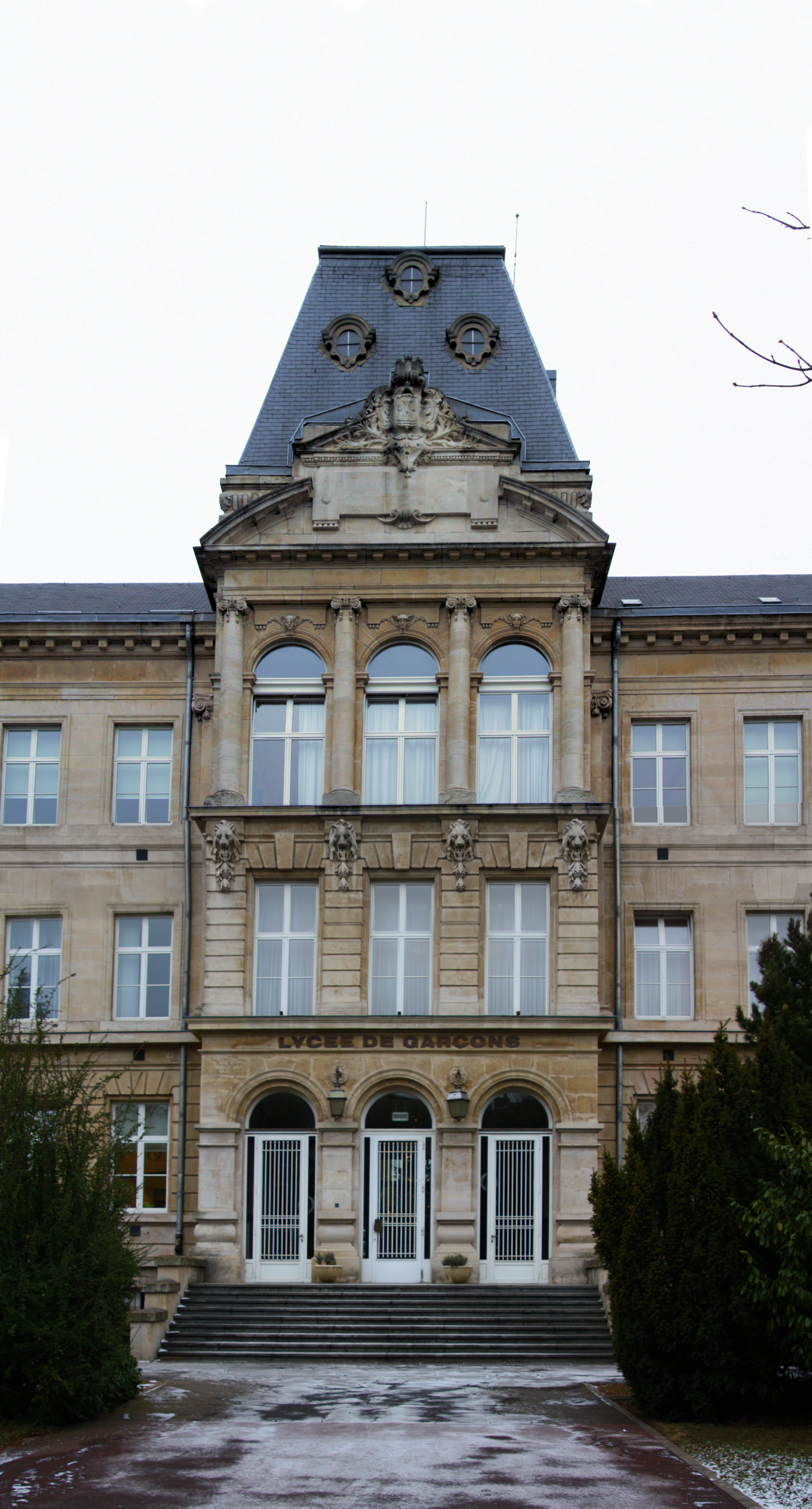
LGE 1.jpg
