= Ricardo Varela =

Portuguese swimmer

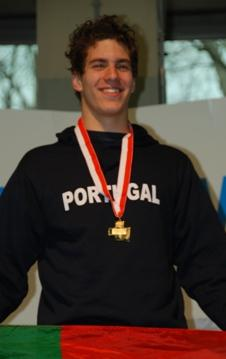
- Ricardo Varela at Multinations Júnior, Geneva

Personal information
- Full name: Ricardo José Silva Varela
- Nationality: Portuguese
- Born: September 5, 1989 (age 36) Póvoa de Varzim, Portugal
- Height: 1.79 m (5 ft 10 in)
- Weight: 73 kg (161 lb)

Sport
- Sport: Swimming
- Strokes: Breaststroke
- Club: Clube Naval Setubalense

Ricardo José Silva Varela (born September 5, 1989) is a Portuguese swimmer from Clube Naval Setubalense. He has practised swimming since he was three years old, and has been a professional swimmer for about 11 years. Varela started to swim, until the age of 8 in Clube Fluvial Vilacondense, in Vila do Conde. Since then he represents the CNS, becoming national champion, record holder and be a part of the National Team. His best stroke is breaststroke, in the distances of 50, 100 and 200 meters, and right now is a senior. He's trained by Pedro Vale (Head Coach).

== Career highlights ==
=== 2002–2003 ===
- Twice South Portugal Champion
- Best swimmer at Vale do Tejo Cup
- Gold Medal at TAP Meeting Internacional
- Three gold medals and one silver medal at the Region Championships
- Six Region relay titles
- National Champion and Silver medal at the National Championship

=== 2003–2004 ===
- Silver Medal at Estoril Meeting Internacional
- Five Gold medals and two Silver medals at the Region Championships
- One Gold, one Silver medal, and two bronze medals at the National Championships
- Gold Medal at TAP Meeting Internacional
- Bronze Medal in relay in the National Championships
- Three Gold medals and two Silver Medals in relay at the Region Championships

=== 2004–2005 ===
- In the National Team twice: Multinations Youth and European Youth Olympic Festival
- Bronze medal at Multinations Youth
- Silver Medal at Estoril Meeting Internacional
- Gold Medal at TAP Meeting Internacional
- Three gold medals and silver medal at the National Championships
- Two gold medals at the Region Championships
- Two gold medal and two silver medals in relay at the National Championships
- Gold Medal in relay at the Region Championships

=== 2005–2006 ===
- Three bronze medals at the Junior National Championships

(Outdated)

=== 2006–2007 ===
- Three Gold Medals at the Junior National Championships
- Gold Medal at Multinations Junior
- Tenth place and tenth second place at the European Junior Championships
- Two Silver Medals and one bronze Medal at the Summer National Championships

=== 2007–2008 ===
- Second best team at the National Clubs Championship
- Fourth best performance at 100 meters breaststroke in the 25 meter's pool
- Bronze Medal at the Winter National Championships
- Two silver medals at Loulé International Meeting
- One Silver Medal and two bronze Medals at the Summer National Championships

=== 2008–2009 ===
- National Champion and bronze medal at the Short Course Portuguese National Championships
- Seventh, Eighth and Twelfth place at the 11th Luxembourg EuroMeet
- Two Silver Medals at the 3rd Póvoa de Varzim Internacional Meeting
- Eleven place at the Spanish Open Championships

=== Abstract ===
- South Portugal Championships: Two Gold Medals
- Region Championships: Ten Gold Medals, Three Silver Medals (Outdated)
- National Championships: Nine Gold Medals, Nine Silver Medals, Ten Bronze Medals
- Best swimmer at Vale do Tejo Cup in 2003
- Three Consecutive Gold Titles at TAP International Meeting
- Six times in the National Team
- Bronze Medal at Multinations Youth
- Gold Medal and Silver Medal in the Multinations Junior
- Tenth place and tenth second place at the European Junior Championships

== Best performances ==
=== 25 Meters Pool ===
Event	Time	Place	Year	FINA Points 2008
50 meters Breaststrokes	28.99	Silves, Portugal	2007	770
100 meters Breaststroke	1.00.71	Silves, Portugal	2009	864
200 meters Breaststroke	2.14.34	Óbidos, Portugal	2007	808

=== 50 Meters Pool ===
Event	Time	Place	Year	FINA Points 2009
50 meters Breaststroke	28.94	Faro, Portugal	2009	851
100 meters Breaststroke	1.03.45	Faro, Portugal	2009	829
200 meters Breaststroke	2.16.46	Faro, Portugal	2009	841

== Portuguese national records ==
=== 50 Meters Pool ===
Prova	Categoria	Tempo	Local	Ano	Pontos FINA 2008	Observações
100 meters Breaststroke	Infantil B	1.13.86	Restelo, Lisbon, Portugal	2004	525	Ainda Recorde Nacional

(Outdated)

== National team athlete ==
- Mutinations Youth Meet – Madeira, Portugal
- European Youth Olympic Festival – Lignano Sabbiadoro, Italy
- Multinations Junior Meet – Geneva Switzerland
- European Junior Championships – Antwerp, Belgium
- 11th Luxembourg Euro-Meet – Luxembourg, Luxembourg
- Spanish Open Championships – Málaga, Spain

== Open Water ==
- World Cup (Setúbal) - 10 km
- Setúbal Open Water - 2,6 km
- Sesimbra Open Water - 1,5 km
- Sines Open Water - 1,5 km
- Castelo de Bode Open Water - 10 km

== Academic life ==
=== Academic history ===
- College Coração de Jesus – Póvoa de Varzim (1992–1998) – (Nursery to 3rd class)
- Areias Primary School – Setúbal (1998–1999) – (4th class)
- Aranguês School – Setúbal (1998–2001) – (5th and 6th class)
- Sebastião da Gama High School (2001–2007) – (7th to 12th class)
- Universidade Técnica de Lisboa – Instituto Superior Técnico (2007–2008) – Mechanical Engineering Course
- Instituto Politécnico de Setúbal – Escola Superior de Tecnologia (2008–2012) – Mechanical Engineering Course
