= 150th anniversary of Luxembourg's independence =

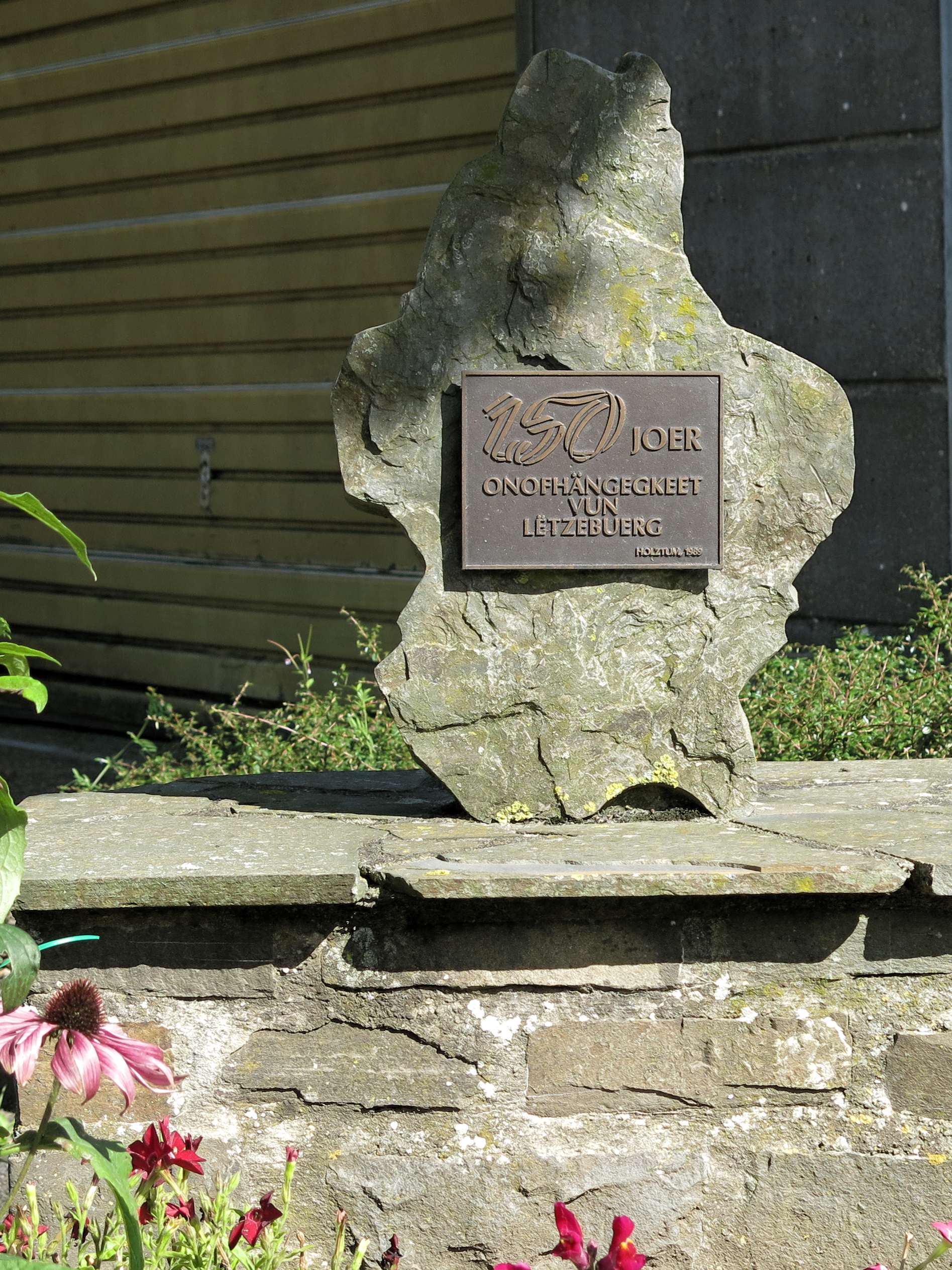
A monument commemorating 150 years of Luxembourgish independence in Holzthum

The 150th anniversary of Luxembourg's independence (Luxembourgish: 150 Joer Onofhängegkeet vun Lëtzebuerg) was celebrated in 1989 to commemorate the 1839 Treaty of London, which established formal independence of the German-speaking part of the country.

The celebrations were for the most part funded by the government of Luxembourg, with the central stage taken by a major historical exhibition named From State to Nationhood, 1839–1989. 150 Years of Independence.

== Background ==
In contrast to some other nations, including neighboring Belgium, Luxembourg does not have a universally accepted independence date, let alone an established tradition to commemorate it. Several historical events could be considered worthy of such designation but it was due to external circumstances that they did not end up with such recognition.

One candidate was 1815, when Luxembourg was elevated to the rank of grand duchy and gained its formal autonomy at the Congress of Vienna. However, no commemorative tradition could realistically emerge within the next 50 years later, as in 1865 the country was still within the German Confederation. A century on, in 1915, the Grand Duchy was occupied by the German Empire, which made celebrations impossible.

Another possible date was 1867, the year of Luxembourg Crisis and the second Treaty of London, which resulted in the final establishment of Luxembourg's independence. Yet, in 1917 the country was still under the German WWI occupation, so no commemorative measures were undertaken.

The year 1839, when the first Treaty of London was signed, and the German-speaking Luxembourg as it is known nowadays was created, was therefore best positioned to produce a commemorative tradition. A proposal to celebrate the 50th anniversary was put forward by Prime Minister Paul Eyschen in 1888, and those plans were scrapped due to concerns about the health of King William III of the Netherlands, who at the time was also the Grand Duke of Luxembourg. The 100th anniversary of the treaty was properly celebrated in 1939.

== Preparations ==
The idea to commemorate the Grand Duchy's independence was conceived by a number of Luxembourgers from the country's cultural elite: writer Jul Christophory, organist Jean-Jacques Kasel, lawyer Christian Calmes, and, most prominently, historian Gilbert Trausch. The group suggested then-Prime Minister Jacques Santer, whom Trausch and Kasel knew personally. The government approved the initiative and agreed to provide necessary funding.

Going back to holding the independence celebrations on anniversary commemorations to the 1839 Treaty of London was also Trausch's idea, who had been emphasizing the importance of that particular event for the history of Luxembourg for more than a decade at that point.

A commission in charge of 150th independence anniversary celebrations was assembled by the government in September 1987. October 1987 saw the launch of a sub-committee to oversee the future ‘From State to Nationhood, 1839–1989’ exhibit. Gilbert Trausch was appointed the chair of both.
