= Haut (newspaper) =

- Founded: 2 February 1981
- Ceased publication: 1983
- Language: French and German

Haut was a newspaper published in Luxembourg between 1981 and 1983.
