= Kim Kintziger =

Luxembourgish footballer (born 1987)

Personal information
- Full name: Kim Kintziger
- Date of birth: 2 April 1987 (age 39)
- Place of birth: Luxembourg
- Position: Defender

Team information
- Current team: FC Mondercange

Youth career
- Sanem

Senior career*
Years	Team	Apps	(Gls)
2004–2007	Swift Hesperange	70	(0)
2007–2011	FC Differdange 03	25	(1)
2011–2012	Union 05 Kayl-Tétange	13	(1)
2012–2013	FC Differdange 03	13	(0)
2013–2016	Jeunesse Esch	66	(5)
2016–2025	FC Mondercange	128	(6)

International career^{‡}
2005–2010	Luxembourg	40	(1)
- * Club domestic league appearances and goals as of 18 February 2024 ‡ National team caps and goals as of 27 June 2023

Kim Kintziger (born 2 April 1987) is a retired Luxembourgish football player, who last played for FC Mondercange in the Luxembourg National Division.

== Club career ==
Kintziger started his career at Swift Hesperange and joined Differdange in summer 2007.

After moving to FC Mondercange for the 2016–17 season, he became a coach at the club in 2024–25.

== International career ==
He made his debut for Luxembourg in an October 2005 World Cup qualification match against Estonia and earned 40 caps, scoring one goal. He played in 10 FIFA World Cup qualification matches and 10 UEFA European Cup qualification matches. He scored his sole international goal in a friendly against Iceland on the 14 November 2009 in a match that ended in a 1–1 draw.

His final game for the national team was a friendly against Algeria in November 2010.
