= Erna Hennicot-Schoepges =

Luxembourgish politician

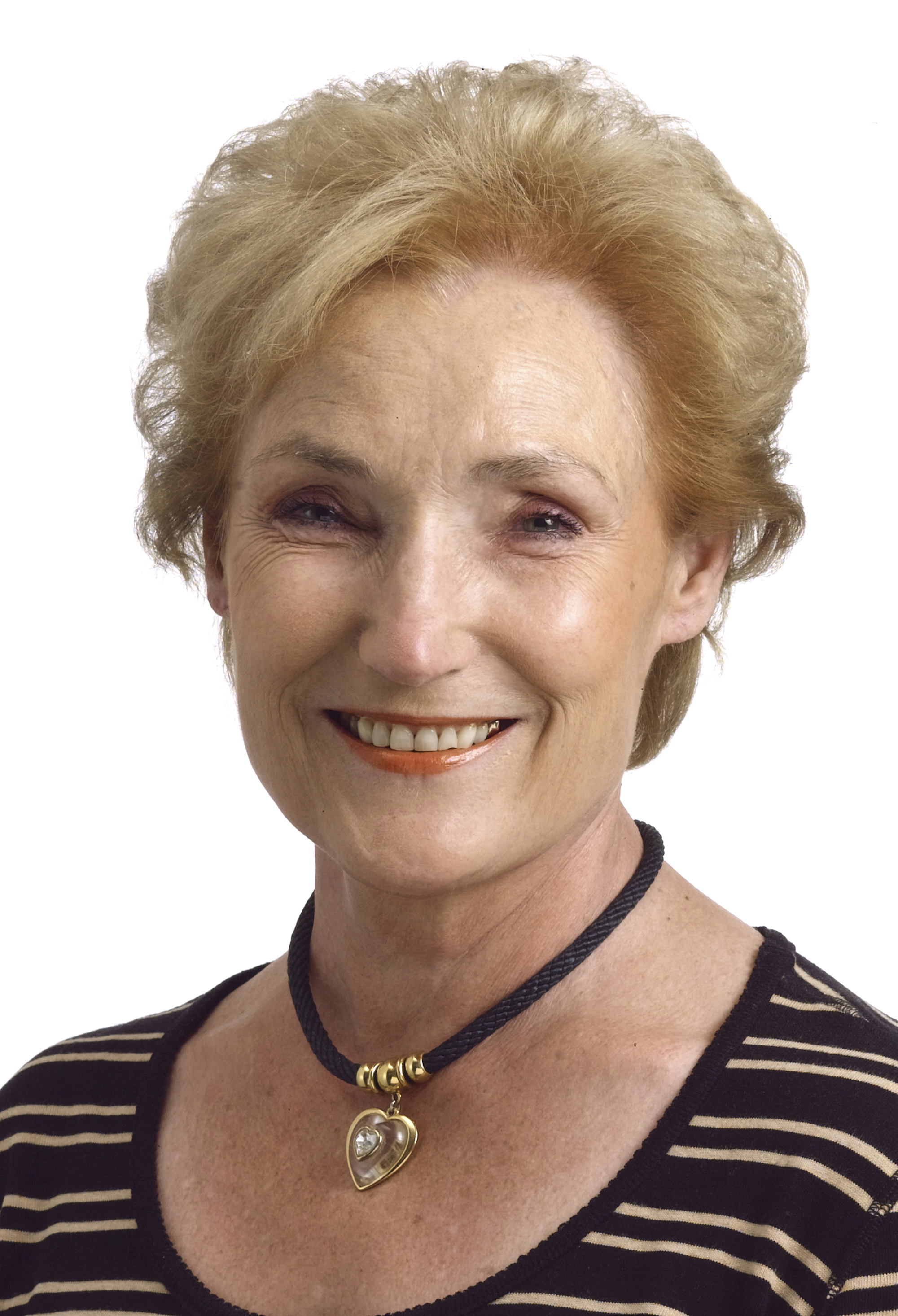
Official portrait, 2004

Marie Ernestine Emma Hennicot-Schoepges (née Schoepges; born 24 July 1941 in Dudelange) is a Luxembourgish politician for the Christian Social People's Party. She was a Member of the European Parliament from 2004 to 2009, sitting as a CSV member of the European People's Party.

Erna Hennicot-Schoepges has an extensive history in cultural affairs. She was educated in Musical studies, for which she was awarded the gold medal as a pianist, as well as philosophy and literature at the Royal Conservatoire of Brussels in Brussels, Ecole Normale in Paris, the Mozarteum in Salzburg, and the Centre Universitaire in Luxembourg.

Her political career reflects this deep interest in culture as well as her commitment to civil affairs. The Hennicot-Schoepges was elected Mayor of Walferdange and then moved on to become the first woman President of Luxembourg’s Parliament followed by her appointment as Luxembourg’s Minister of Culture, Higher Education and Research and Public Works. Throughout this time, she was also highly engaged as a member of the Parliamentary Assembly of the Council of Europe, and of the European Parliament.

Hennicot-Schoepges has made many political contributions to the cultural field. On the national level, she is responsible for the creation of the University of Luxembourg in 2003 and the Luxembourg Philharmonic Hall Joséphine Charlotte in 2005, among other projects. On a European level, she was the rapporteur to the EP of the “European Year of Intercultural Dialogue, 2008.” She is also a member of the Jury for the European Capitals of Culture and a member of the Council of State in Luxembourg. Additionally, she has written a number of books and articles on subjects ranging from European politics, human rights, religion, and education.

Political offices
Preceded by Léon Bollendorff	President of the Chamber of Deputies; 1989–1995	Succeeded by Jean Spautz
Preceded by Robert Goebbels	Minister for Public Works; 1999–2004	Succeeded by Claude Wiseler
Party political offices
Preceded by Jean-Claude Juncker	President of the CSV; 1995–2003	Succeeded by François Biltgen
