= Colette Flesch =

Luxembourgish politician (1937–2026)

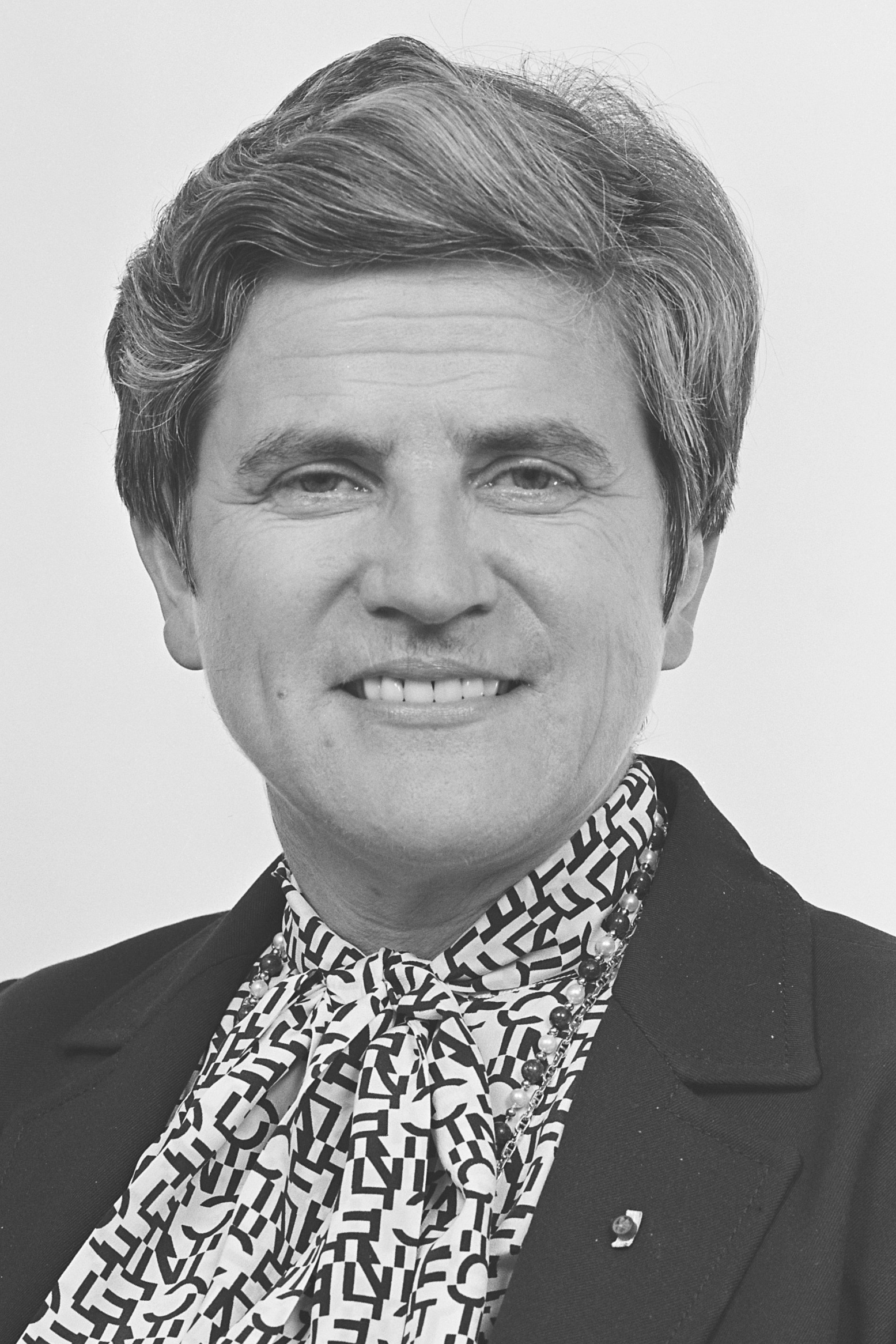
- Flesch, c. 1984

Member of the Chamber of Deputies
- In office 3 August 2004 – 8 July 2009
- Constituency: Centre
- In office 23 July 1984 – 18 July 1989
- Constituency: Centre
- In office 5 February 1969 – 22 November 1980
- Constituency: Centre

Member of the European Parliament
- In office 7 August 1999 – 19 July 2004
- Constituency: Luxembourg
- In office 25 July 1989 – 5 June 1990
- Constituency: Luxembourg
- In office 24 July 1984 – 8 October 1985
- Constituency: Luxembourg

Deputy Prime Minister of Luxembourg Minister of Foreign Affairs and the Economy
- In office 22 November 1980 – 20 July 1984
- Prime Minister: Pierre Werner
- Preceded by: Gaston Thorn
- Succeeded by: Jacques Poos

Minister for Justice
- In office 22 November 1980 – 20 July 1984
- Prime Minister: Pierre Werner
- Preceded by: Gaston Thorn
- Succeeded by: Robert Krieps

Mayor of Luxembourg City
- In office 23 December 1969 – 22 November 1980
- Preceded by: Paul Wilwertz
- Succeeded by: Camille Polfer

Personal details
- Born: 16 April 1937 Dudelange, Luxembourg
- Died: 21 January 2026 (aged 88)
- Party: DP

Colette Marie Alice Madeleine Flesch (16 April 1937 – 21 January 2026) was a Luxembourgish politician and fencer who most notably served as Mayor of Luxembourg City from 1969 to 1980 and as Deputy Prime Minister of Luxembourg from 1980 to 1984, becoming the first woman to hold either position.

== Early life ==
Colette Marie Alice Madeleine Flesch was born on 16 April 1937 in Dudelange to Robert Flesch (1882–1940), a metallurgy engineer at ARBED, and Madeleine Alexandre. Her paternal grandfather was Auguste Flesch (1844-1921), who served as a liberal member of the Chamber of Deputies from 1912 to 1918.

She gained a Bachelor of Arts degree in political science from Wellesley College in 1960, then earned an M.A. in International Affairs from the Fletcher School of Law and Diplomacy at Tufts University, before studying at The Hague Academy of International Law.

=== Olympic career ===
As a fencer she participated in the Individual foil events at the 1960, 1964 and 1968 Summer Olympics.

== Political career ==
Flesch worked for the European Economic Community in Brussels, specialising in the agricultural side of the Common Market for five years.

She served in numerous political capacities, both in government and within the Democratic Party and the European Liberal Democrat and Reform Party. In December 1968 she was elected to the Chamber of Deputies in an early election. In 1969 she became the first female mayor of Luxembourg City at the age of 32, which she remained until 1980. Besides her work in the Chamber of Deputies (1969–1980, 1984–1989, and 2004–1009), she was also a member of the European Parliament from 1969 to 1980, 1984 to 1985, 1989 to 1990, and 1999 to 2004.

In 1976, she became the general secretary of the Democratic Party, and was its president from 1981 to 1989.

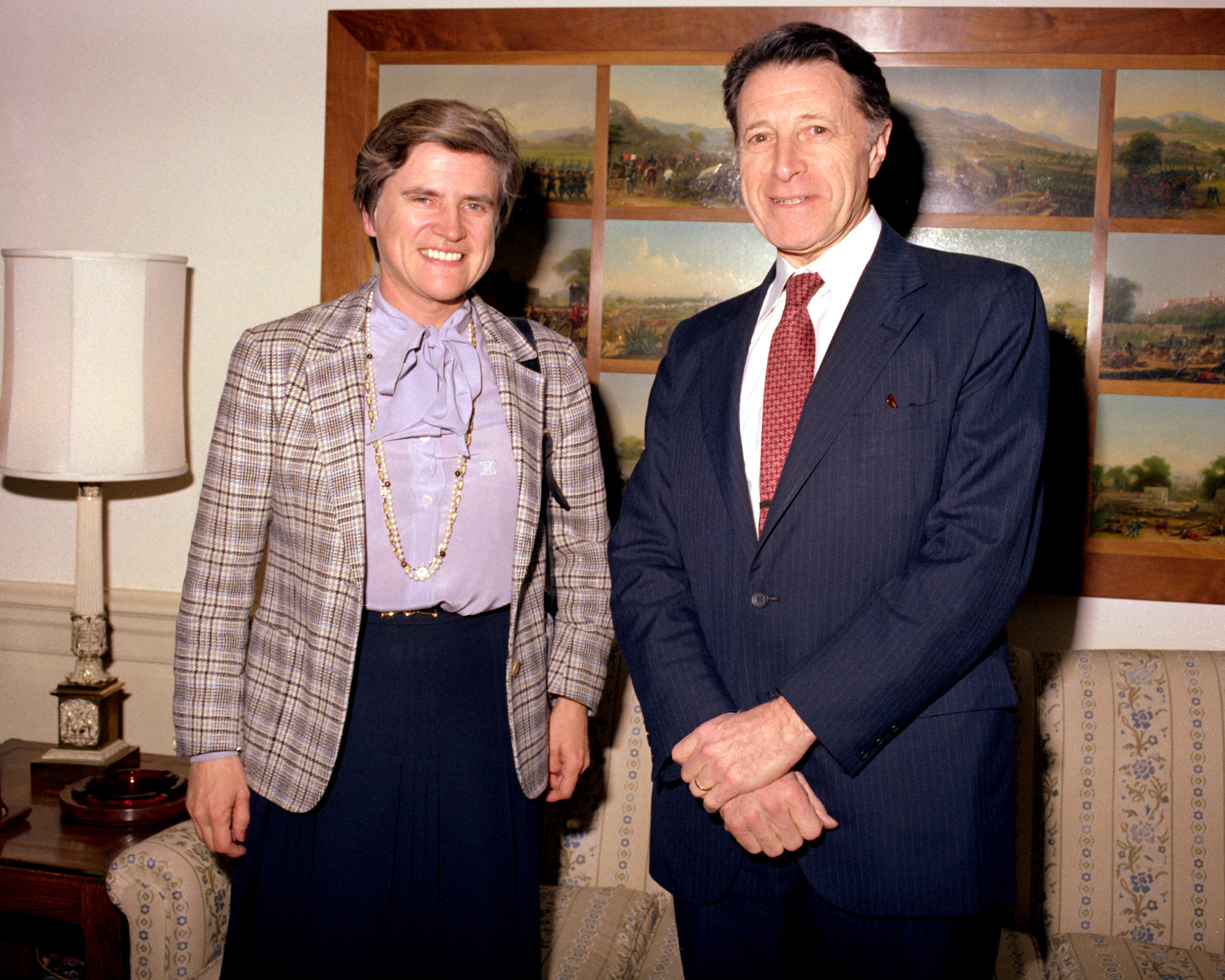
Flesch with then United States Secretary of Defense Caspar Weinberger at The Pentagon in 1982

From 1980 to 1984 she was a member of Pierre Werner's government, as deputy prime minister, foreign minister, and minister for foreign trade, cooperation, the economy, small and medium enterprises and justice.

From 1990 to 1999, she was the European Commission's director-general for culture, communication and sports, and later for translation.

From 1 January 1988 to 31 December 1999, she was a city councillor for Luxembourg City, and was later an alderman.

She was also the president of the European Institute of Cultural Routes (EICR).

== Death ==
Flesch died on 21 January 2026, at the age of 88.
