= Léon Bollendorff =

Luxembourgish politician

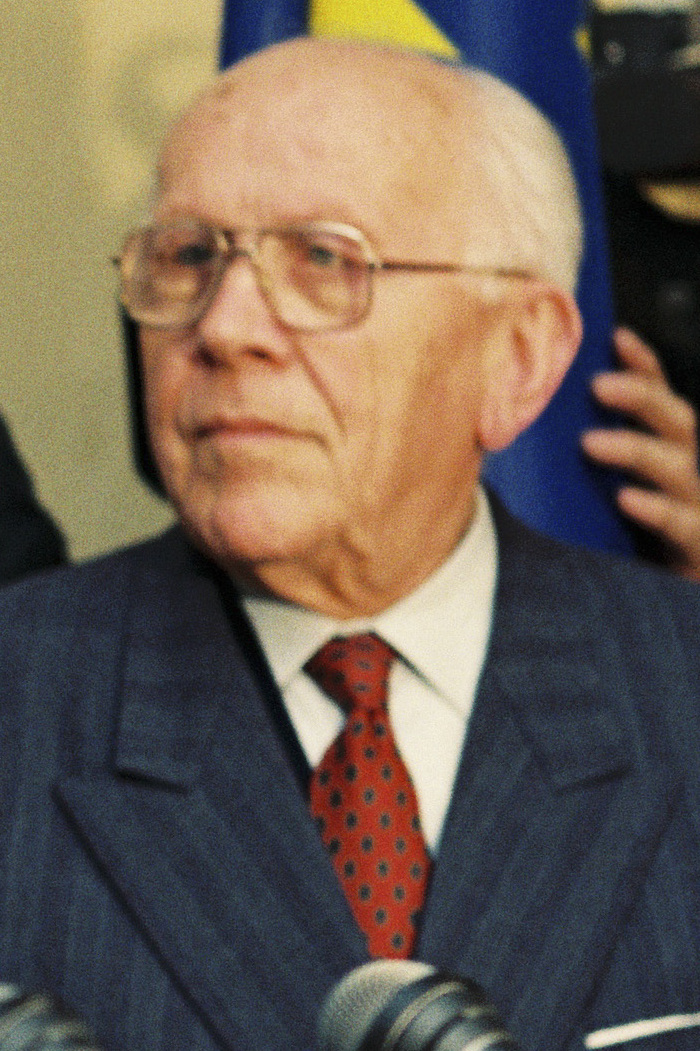
Bollendorff in 1989

Dr Léon Bollendorff (31 March 1915 – 5 June 2011) was a Luxembourgish politician, teacher, and philologist. He was born in Wasserbillig. A member of the Christian Social People's Party, he sat in the Chamber of Deputies, of which he served as President (1979–1989). He also sat on the communal council of Luxembourg City, holding office as échevin.

Political offices
Preceded by René Van Den Bulcke	President of the Chamber of Deputies; 1979–1989	Succeeded by Erna Hennicot-Schoepges
