= Gabaglio =

Gabaglio is a surname. Notable people with the surname include:

- Alejandra Gabaglio (born 1966), Argentine table tennis player
- Antonio Gabaglio (1840–1909), Italian statistician
- Emilio Gabaglio (1937–2024), Italian trade union leader
