= Free Luxembourgish Workers' Union =

National trade union centre in Luxembourg

FLA
- Free Luxembourger Workers' Union
- Freie Lëtzebuerger Arbechterverband
- Founded: 1945
- Dissolved: 1965
- Location: Luxembourg
- Members: 10 000 (1946)
- Key people: Nic Momper, Jos Grandgenet
- Affiliations: WFTU

The Free Luxembourger Workers' Union (Luxembourgish: Freie Lëtzebuerger Arbechterverband, abbreviated 'FLA') was a national trade union centre in Luxembourg, active between 1945 and 1965.

== Founding ==
FLA was founded in 1945, after a split in the Luxembourg Workers' Union (LAV). The founders of FLA revolted against the anti-communist stance of the LAV leadership.

== Communist links ==
Several of the FLA leaders were also members of the Central Committee of the Communist Party of Luxembourg, including the FLA president Nic Momper and general secretary Jos Grandgenet. The opponents of FLA accused it of being a communist front. LAV charged that the founding of FLA had been an idea hatched by the communist leader Dominique Urbany.

FLA was affiliated to the World Federation of Trade Unions.

== Onset of the Cold War ==
At the time of its foundation FLA had around 10-11 000 members. As of 1946, FLA was the largest trade union centre amongst blue-collar workers. It was the majority union in metal industries and mines (with the exception of the mines at Dudelange, were LAV retained their prominence). However, it began to decline with the onset of the Cold War. From 1949 onwards the influence of FLA declined. An important factor contributing to this development was the exclusion of FLA from collective bargaining negotiations, a policy upheld by both the Luxembourgish employers as well as the trade union competitors (LAV and the LCGB). FLA was however able to retain a foothold in industries in small and medium-sized companies in rural areas of the country for some time.

In the 1950 elections to the Labour Chamber, FLA trailed behind both LAV and LCGB.

== Later phase and dissolution ==
In 1958 FLA, along with three other WFTU-affiliated labour centres in Western Europe (CGT, CGIL, EVC) set up a Common Market Action Committee.

In 1965 FLA was dissolved. At the time of its dissolution, it had around 1500 members. Most of them joined LAV unions.
