= Enzo Bearzot Award =

Italian award for football managers

- Sport: Association football
- Awarded for: The best Italian manager of each year
- Local name: Premio Nazionale Enzo Bearzot (Italian)
- Country: Italy
- Presented by: Christian Associations of Italian Workers; Italian Football Federation

History
- First award: 2011
- Editions: 15
- First winner: Cesare Prandelli
- Most recent: Cesc Fàbregas

The Enzo Bearzot Award (Italian: Premio Nazionale Enzo Bearzot) is an annual recognition for Italian football managers. Established in 2011 and awarded by a jury composed of representatives of major Italian sports newspapers, the prize is sponsored by the Sporting Union of the Christian Associations of Italian Workers and the Italian Football Federation.

== History ==
The award was created in honour of Enzo Bearzot, the 1982 FIFA World Cup-winning coach of the Italy national team. He holds the record for the most appearances on the bench of the Italy national team, with 104 appearances from 27 September 1975 to 18 June 1986. He died on 21 December 2010 in Milan at the age of 83, exactly 42 years after Vittorio Pozzo.

The president of the Italian Football Federation presents the Enzo Bearzot Award each year at the hall of honour of the Italian National Olympic Committee.

== Winners ==
Year	Winner	Team	Ref(s)
2011	Cesare Prandelli	Italy	
2012	Walter Mazzarri	(Italy) Napoli	
2013	Vincenzo Montella	(Italy) Fiorentina	
2014	Carlo Ancelotti	(Spain) Real Madrid	
2015	Massimiliano Allegri	(Italy) Juventus	
2016	Claudio Ranieri	(England) Leicester City	
2017	Maurizio Sarri	(Italy) Napoli	
2018	Eusebio Di Francesco	(Italy) Roma	
2019	Roberto Mancini	Italy	
2020	Paolo Rossi (Note: Due to the COVID-19 pandemic in Italy, the 2020 edition of the event did not take place. Paolo Rossi, who died in December 2020 and was not a football manager, received the prize posthumously.)	—	
2022	Roberto De Zerbi	(Ukraine) Shakhtar Donetsk	
2023	Luciano Spalletti	(Italy) Napoli	
2024	Simone Inzaghi	(Italy) Internazionale	
2025	Gian Piero Gasperini	(Italy) Atalanta	
2026	Cesc Fàbregas	(Italy) Como	
