= General Confederation of Labour of Luxembourg =

The General Confederation of Labour of Luxembourg (French: Confédération générale du travail luxembourgeoise, CGT-L) is a trade union federation in Luxembourg.

The federation was established in 1927, on the initiative of unions representing railway and metal workers in Luxembourg. By the 1970s, its largest affiliate was the Luxembourg Workers' Union, which attempted to form a single general union for all workers. It became the Independent Luxembourg Trade Union Confederation (OGBL), but with many unions deciding not to merge into it, the CGT-L remained in existence.

The CGT-L operates as a loose umbrella organisation, and shares much of its leadership with the OGBL. As the largest and most representative trade union federation in the country, it is affiliated to the European Trade Union Confederation, and the International Trade Union Confederation.

The number of affiliates of the CGT-L has declined, as a series of mergers have taken place. In 2020, one of its two affiliates, the National Federation of Railway Workers, Transport Workers, Civil Servants and Luxembourg Employees, agreed to merge into the other, the OGBL. It is unclear whether this will lead to the dissolution of the CGT-L.

== Former affiliates ==
Union	Abbreviation	Founded	Left	Reason not affiliated	Membership (1965)
Federation of Hotel Personnel	GANYMED	1927			750
Federation of Printing Workers of Luxembourg	FLTL	1864	2005	Merged into OGBL	400
Federation of Prison Wardens of Luxembourg			1963	Merged into FNCTTFEL	N/A
General Federation of Teachers of Luxembourg	FGIL	1900	1979	Merged into OGBL	
Luxembourg Workers' Union	LAV	1920	1979	Merged into OGBL	20,000
National Federation of Railway Workers, Transport Workers, Civil Servants and Employees of Luxembourg	FNCTTFEL	1909	2020	Merged into OGBL	10,000
Union of Foremen and Senior Machinists		1949			1,250

== Presidents ==
Barthélémy Barbel
1956: Antoine Krier
1970: Mathias Hinterscheid
1977: John Castegnaro
2004: Jean-Claude Reding
2014: André Roeltgen
2019: Nora Back
