= General Federation of Teachers of Luxembourg =

Trade union

The General Federation of Teachers of Luxembourg (French: Fédération générale des instituteurs luxembourgeois, FGIL) was a trade union representing teachers in Luxembourg.

The union was founded in 1900, and in 1905 joined the International Bureau of Federations of Teachers. Many Catholics in the union objected to this, and left in 1909 to found the Catholic Union of Teachers. By World War II, it represented the majority of men teachers, but only a minority of women. It affiliated to the General Confederation of Labour of Luxembourg, and in 1979, it merged with the Luxembourg Workers' Union, to form the Independent Luxembourg Trade Union Confederation.
