= Federation of Private Employees =

Private sector trade union in Luxembourg

The Federation of Private Employees (French: Fédération des employés privés, FEP) was a Luxembourg trade union representing private sector, white collar workers in Luxembourg. It was dissolved in 1998.

== History ==
The union was founded in 1918, when the recently founded National Federation of Private Employees merged with a union of white collar workers in the mining industry. Until the 1960s, it focused on attempting to change the law to give its members similar working conditions to civil servants. From 1965, it became involved in more collective agreements, and this helped it increase its membership, which reached 16,000 by 1974.

In the 1970s, the union worked closely with the Luxembourg Workers' Union (LAV), but this led to internal disagreements, and the Luxembourg Association of Banking and Insurance Employees (ALEBA) split away in 1976. In 1979, the union's leadership left, along with some of the members, to join the Independent Luxembourg Trade Union Confederation, successor to the LAV.

The union's membership fell to only 5,000 by 1989, and the following year, the right wing of the union split away, forming the National Union of Private Employees — Reformers (SNEP). In 1998, it lost its last seat on a representative body, and it dissolved soon afterwards.
