= Luxembourg Pride =

Annual LGBTQ event in Luxembourg

Luxembourg pride
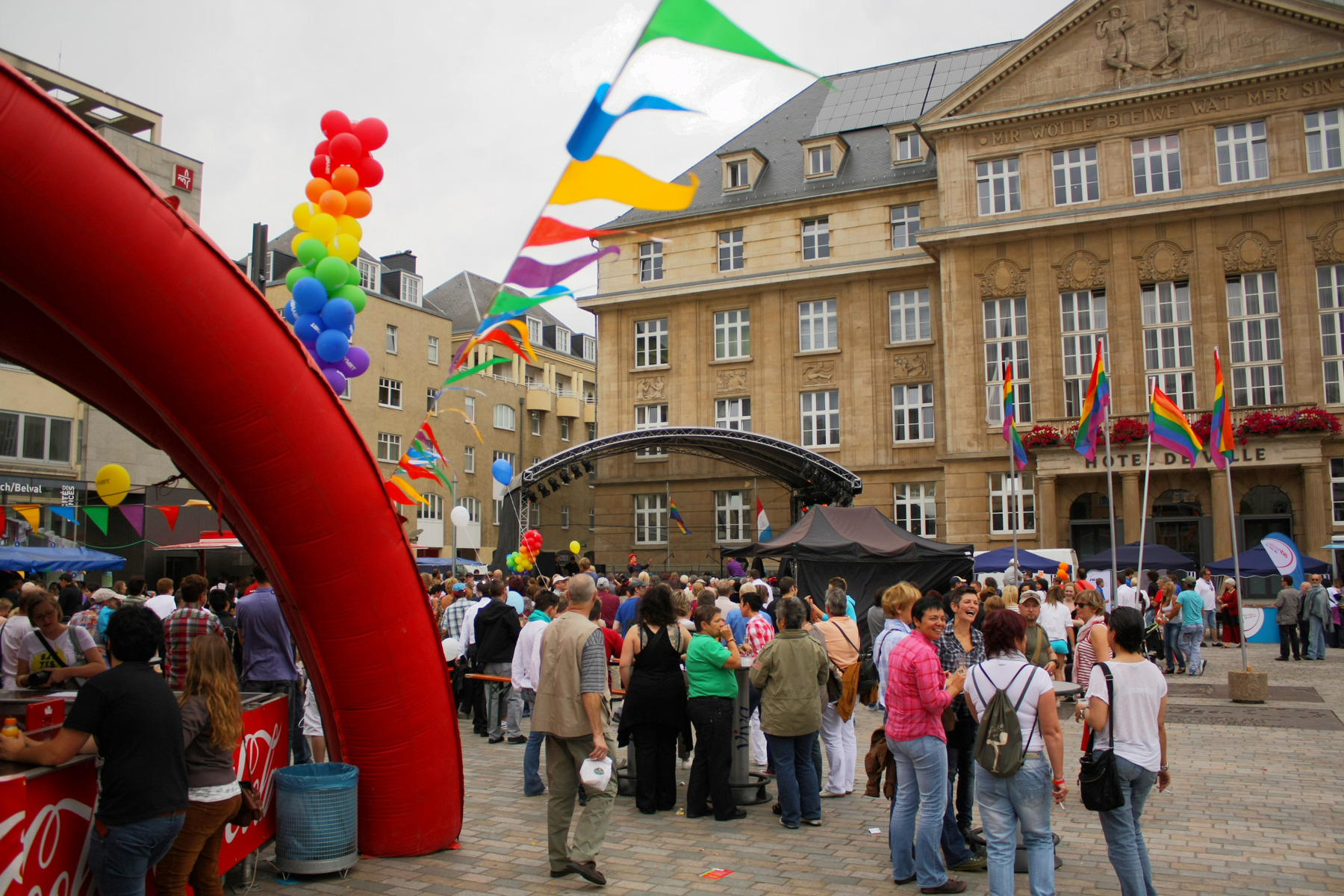
- Frequency: annually
- Location: Esch-sur-Alzette
- Country: Luxembourg
- Years active: 1999–
- Website: luxembourgpride.lu

The Luxembourg Pride is a pride festival held annually in Luxembourg in celebration of the LGBT population. The festival lasts a week and includes events such as concerts, artistic presentations, marathons, bingos, an outdoor fair and a pride march, which takes place in Esch-sur-Alzette.

Unlike the celebrations of other countries, which take place in June in honor of LGBT Pride month, the Luxembourg Pride week takes place in July. This happens so that the event does not coincide with the celebrations of Luxembourg National Day, which take place on June 22 and 23. However, some events in honor of International LGBT Pride Day take place in the country in June, although they take place outside the context of Luxembourg Pride week. The festival was created in 1999 with the Luxembourgish name of GayMat and is organized by the Rosa Lëtzebuerg Association.

The original name was chosen because it is a game of words from the Luxembourgish expression "Géi mat", which means "go with", and the English word "gay". The festival changed its name to Luxembourg Pride in 2019 because the organizers considered that foreigners did not understand the pun and to make it more inclusive with LGBT+ identities.

Every year, the festival attracts thousands of attendees, including LGBT and heterosexual allies. The pride march, on the other hand, brings together hundreds of people. It usually starts at Esch-sur-Alzette's Place de la Résistance and advances in a one-mile journey until it reaches the city's mayor's office. The event has been attended by political figures such as the mayor of Esch-sur-Alzette, Vera Spautz, and the Prime Minister of Luxembourg, Xavier Bettel.

== History ==
The first Pride event in the country took place in 1999, when members of the Rosa Lëtzebuerg Association, an organization in favor of LGBT rights created in 1996, met at the Place du Théâtre in the city of Luxembourg and installed an information stand to raise awareness around the problems of Luxembourg LGBT populations. After the event grew its attendance, it was moved to the Place d'Armes. In 2009, the event surpassed one thousand attendees for the first time.

In 2010, the organizers decided to change the concept of GayMat and it went from being a small celebration to a week-long pride festival. They also decided to move most events from the city of Luxembourg to Esch-sur-Alzette, because the celebration had not obtained substantial support from businesses and local authorities in previous years. In 2016, the festival surpassed 5,000 participants for the first time, including attendees from all over Luxembourg and from foreign cities such as Cologne and Paris.

Due to the COVID-19 pandemic, the 2020 edition of the festival was held virtually.

== See also ==
- LGBTQ rights in Luxembourg
