= Willem Buiter =

Dutch economist

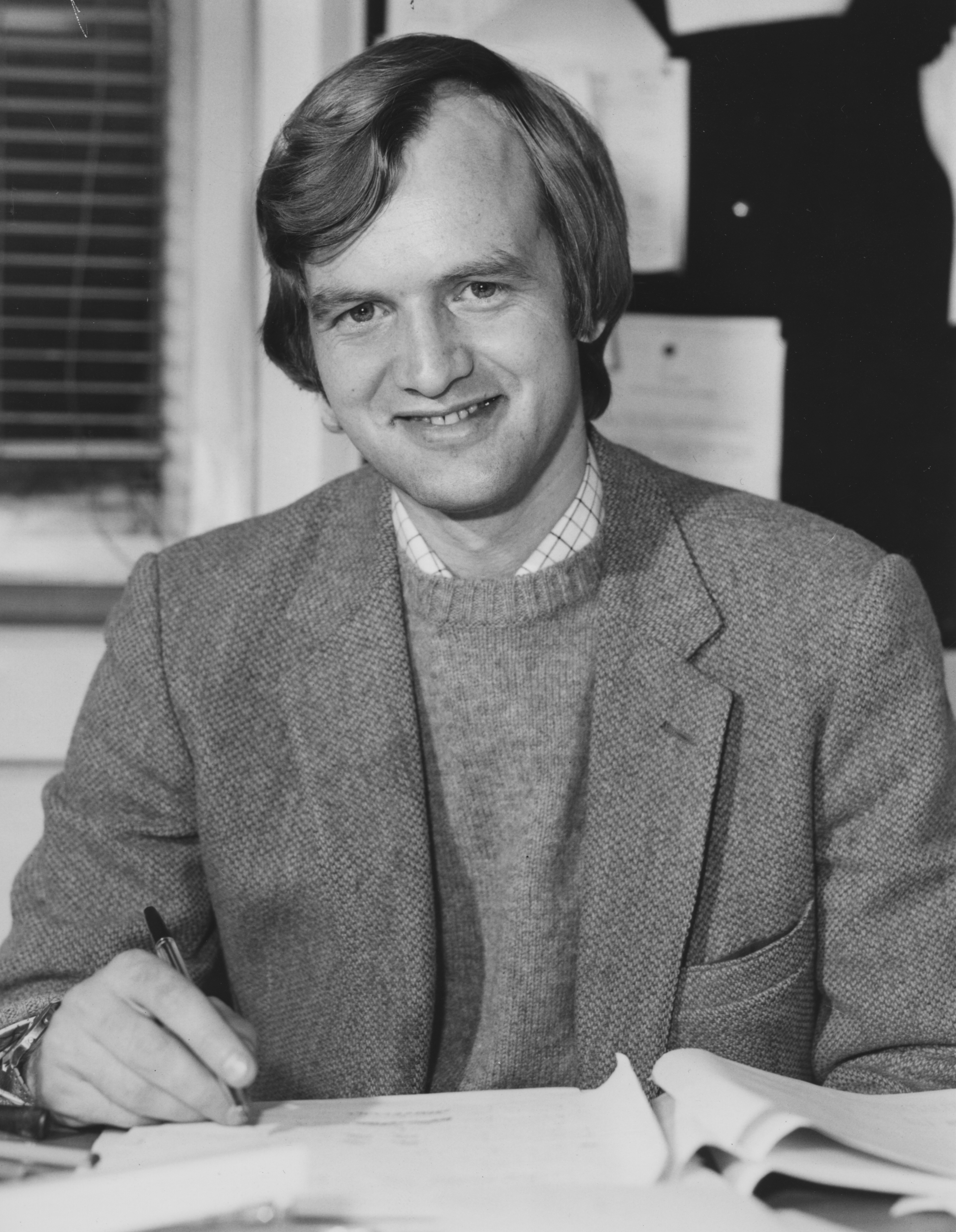
- Buiter in 1984
- Born: 26 September 1949 (age 77); The Hague, Netherlands

Academic background
- Education: University of Cambridge; Yale University

Academic work
- Discipline: Economics, Finance, Political Economy
- Institutions: Princeton University; London School of Economics; University of Bristol; Yale University; University of Cambridge; Columbia University
- Website: Information at IDEAS / RePEc

Willem Hendrik Buiter CBE (born 26 September 1949) is an American-British economist. He spent most of his career as an academic, teaching at various universities. He was the Chief Economist at Citigroup from 2010 to 2018.

== Early life and education ==
Buiter was born in The Hague, Netherlands on 26 September 1949. He is a national of the United States and the United Kingdom. Willem's father, Harm Buiter, was a Dutch economist, international trades union official and politician of the Labour Party (PvdA), who had served as Mayor of Groningen.

Buiter went to the European School in Brussels, Belgium from 1962 to 1967, where he obtained his European Baccalaureate. After studying Political and Social Science for one year at the University of Amsterdam from 1967 to 1968, Buiter went to Emmanuel College, Cambridge, to study Economics and received his B.A. with First-Class Honours in 1971. He was awarded his M.A. in Economics in 1972 and his M.Phil. in Economics in 1973, his fields of concentration being International Economics, and Economic Development.

Buiter was awarded his PhD in economics from Yale University in New Haven, Connecticut, United States, in 1975. His thesis, "Temporary Equilibrium and Long-Run Equilibrium," was subsequently published in 1979.

== Career ==
From 1975 to 1976 and 1977 to 1979, Buiter was an assistant professor of economics and international affairs at the Woodrow Wilson School of Princeton University in Princeton, New Jersey. From 1976 to 1977, he was lecturer in economics at the London School of Economics and Political Science. He was also a professor of economics at the University of Bristol.

From 1977 until 2011, he was a Research Associate in the Financial Markets and Monetary Economics Program of the National Bureau of Economic Research.

On 1 April 1982, Buiter was appointed Cassel Professor of Economics at the London School of Economics with special reference to money and banking. He left LSE in 1985 to teach economics at Yale University in New Haven, Connecticut from 1985 until 1994. In 1989 Buiter became a correspondent of the Royal Netherlands Academy of Arts and Sciences.

Buiter left the United States in 1994 when he was appointed as Fellow of Trinity College, Cambridge, and professor of International Macroeconomics at the University of Cambridge, positions he held until May 2000. He was an external member of the Bank of England's Monetary Policy Committee from June 1997 to May 2000. In June 2000, he became Chief Economist and Special Advisor to the President at the European Bank for Reconstruction and Development, a position he held until August 2005. From September 2005 until May 2009, Buiter was professor of European Political Economy at the European Institute of the London School of Economics and Political Science. From 2005 to 2010, Buiter was an International Advisor of Goldman Sachs International.

Buiter is a contributor to the Financial Times, where until December 2009 he wrote a blog entitled " Maverecon". In April 2008, he wrote a paper about the situation of Icelandic banks for Landsbanki, together with his wife Anne Sibert. In mid-July 2008, an updated version was presented to the government of Iceland. The Icelandic interlocutors considered the paper to be too market-sensitive and it was agreed to be kept confidential.

From June 2009 till August 2011, he was professor of Political Economy at the Centre for Economic Performance of the LSE. In January 2010, Buiter joined Citigroup as Chief Economist, replacing Lewis Alexander who vacated the position to work with the United States Treasury eight months prior. In an April 2009 blog post, Buiter had earlier described Citigroup as "a conglomeration of worst practice from across the financial spectrum."

Buiter was elected fellow of the European Economic Association. In 2021, he was an adjunct professor at Columbia University's School of International and Public Affairs.

== Other activities ==
- European Systemic Risk Board (ESRB), Member of the Advisory Scientific Committee

== Personal life ==
In 1973 Buiter was married to Jean Archer. The marriage was dissolved in 1997. They had two children, David Michael Alejandro, born on 22 February 1991 in Callao, Peru, and Elizabeth Lorca, born 6 August 1993 in Cochabamba, Bolivia.

Buiter, since 5 June 1998 is married to Anne Sibert, professor of economics at Birkbeck, University of London, who was also an External Member of the Monetary Policy Committee of the Central Bank of Iceland from 2009 until 2012. Sibert, on account of her criticism on the banking system and European finances for the Centre for Economic Policy Research, has been called "a commentator who cannot easily be ignored."
