= Mathias Hinterscheid =

Luxembourgish trade unionist

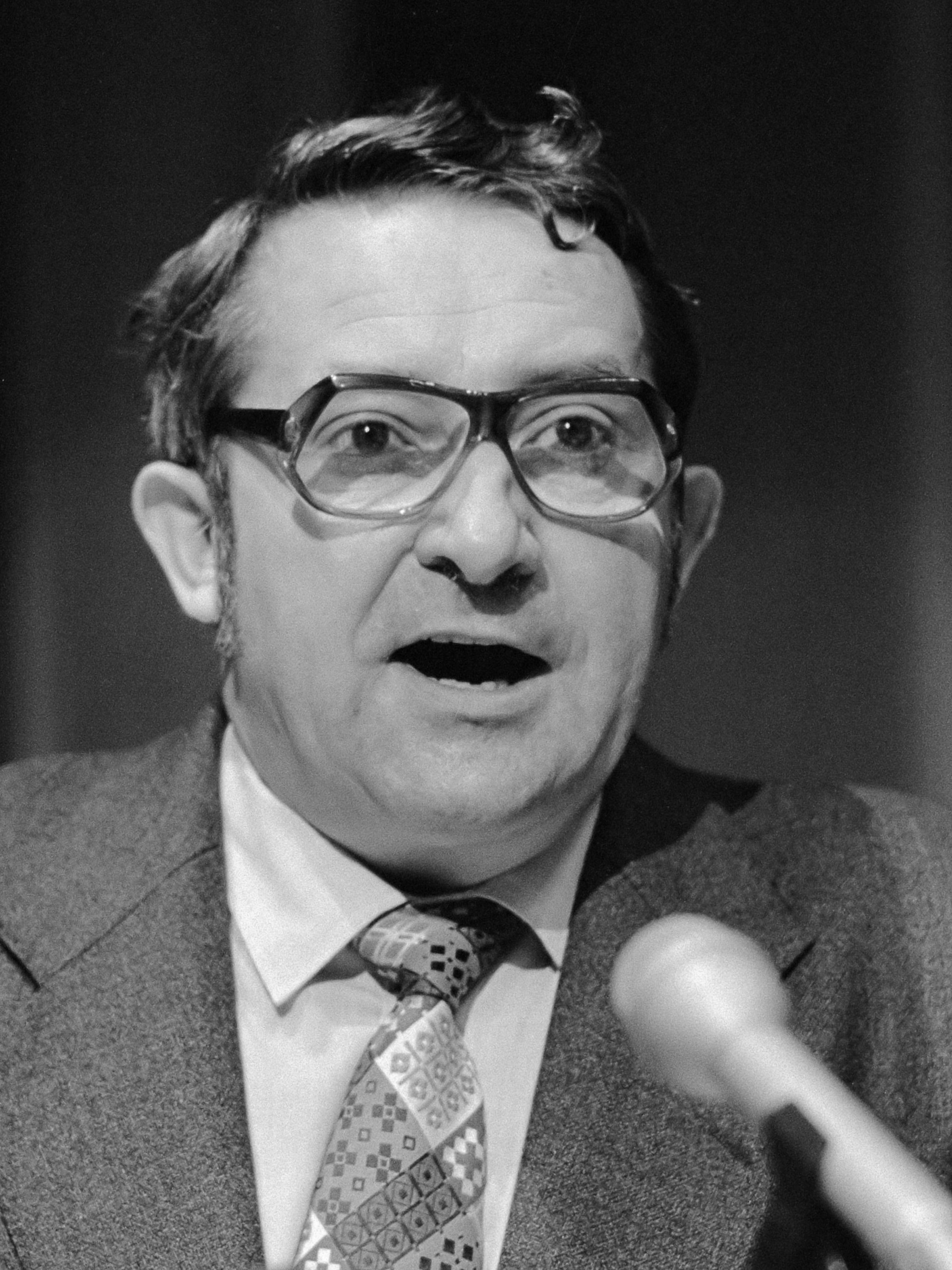
Hinterscheid, in 1981

Mathias Hinterscheid (26 January 1931 – 27 December 2016) was a Luxembourg trade unionist.

Born in Dudelange, Hinterscheid attended the Athanaeum in Luxembourg City. He became a steelworker at Arbed and joined the Luxembourg Workers' Union (LAV) in 1946. In 1947, he joined the Luxembourg Socialist Workers' Party. He began working full-time for the LAV, with responsibility for youth, in 1958.

In 1963, Hinterscheid became the general secretary of the General Confederation of Labour of Luxembourg (CGT-L), to which the LAV was affiliated. In 1970, he moved to become president of both organisations.

In 1976, Hinterscheid was elected as the general secretary of the European Trade Union Confederation (ETUC). During his time in office, the ETUC attracted many new affiliates and became the main focus for engagement between trade unions, the European Economic Community, and other European institutions. He retired in 1991, and became an advisor to Jacques Delors.

From 1998 until 2008, Hinterscheid served on the board of directors of the Central Bank of Luxembourg. He died late in 2016, shortly after being honored for 70 years in the trade union movement.

Trade union offices
Preceded by Nicolas Haupert	General Secretary of the General Confederation of Labour of Luxembourg; 1963–1970	Succeeded by Roby Meis
Preceded by Benny Berg	President of the Luxembourg Workers' Union; 1970–1976	Succeeded by Antoine Weiss
Preceded by Antoine Krier	President of the General Confederation of Labour of Luxembourg; 1970–1976	Succeeded by John Castegnaro
Preceded by Peer Carlsen	General Secretary of the European Trade Union Confederation; 1976–1991	Succeeded by Emilio Gabaglio
