= Claudio Ranieri =

Italian football manager (born 1951)

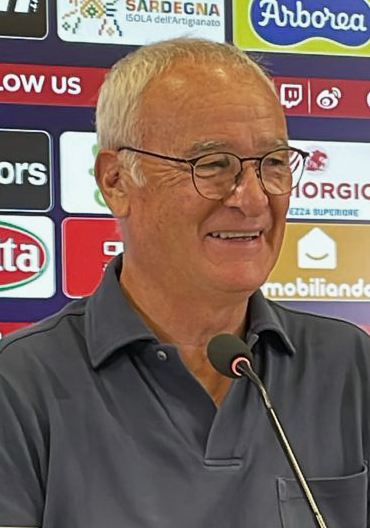
- Ranieri in 2023

Personal information
- Full name: Claudio Ranieri
- Date of birth: 20 October 1951 (age 75)
- Place of birth: Rome, Italy
- Position: Defender

Team information
- Current team: Italy (technical director), (president of Club Italia)

Senior career*
Years	Team	Apps	(Gls)
1973–1974	Roma	6	(0)
1974–1982	Catanzaro	226	(8)
1982–1984	Catania	92	(1)
1984–1986	Palermo	40	(0)
Total		366	(9)

Managerial career
- 1986–1987: Vigor Lamezia
- 1987–1988: Puteolana
- 1988–1991: Cagliari
- 1991–1993: Napoli
- 1993–1997: Fiorentina
- 1997–1999: Valencia
- 1999–2000: Atlético Madrid
- 2000–2004: Chelsea
- 2004–2005: Valencia
- 2007: Parma
- 2007–2009: Juventus
- 2009–2011: Roma
- 2011–2012: Inter Milan
- 2012–2014: Monaco
- 2014: Greece
- 2015–2017: Leicester City
- 2017–2018: Nantes
- 2018–2019: Fulham
- 2019: Roma
- 2019–2021: Sampdoria
- 2021–2022: Watford
- 2023–2024: Cagliari
- 2024–2025: Roma
- * Club domestic league appearances and goals

Claudio Ranieri Ufficiale OMRI (Italian: [ˈklaudjo raˈnjeːri, -ˈnjɛː-]; born 20 October 1951) is an Italian football executive and former manager and player who is the technical director of the Italy national team and is also the president of Club Italia. As manager of Leicester City, he won the 2015–16 Premier League, a feat regarded as one of the greatest shocks in sporting history.

Ranieri began his managerial career in the lower leagues in Italy during the late 1980s, making his name at Cagliari, whom he took from Serie C1 up to Serie A in successive seasons. He subsequently managed Napoli, with which he qualified for the UEFA Cup, only to be dismissed the following season. In 1993, he joined Fiorentina, and immediately led them to Serie A promotion, also winning the Coppa Italia and the Supercoppa Italiana in 1996, before moving to Spain in 1997 to manage Valencia and then Atlético Madrid. With Valencia, he won a Copa del Rey and an UEFA Intertoto Cup, and helped the club to lay new foundations that led them to qualify for the UEFA Champions League.

In 2000, Ranieri moved to England to become head coach at Chelsea. His four seasons there saw Chelsea improve their points total season on season. After substantial investment in the squad by new owner Roman Abramovich in the summer of 2003, Ranieri led the team to finish runners-up in the 2003–04 Premier League, reaching the Champions League semi-final the same season. He was dismissed by Abramovich that May.

After an unsuccessful second spell back in Spain with Valencia, he returned to management in Italy in 2007, where he encountered mixed success with spells at Parma, Juventus, Roma and Inter Milan. In 2012, he was hired to manage Ligue 1 team Monaco, who had just finished in the middle of Ligue 2, and earned promotion as champions in his first season, then finished as Ligue 1 runners-up in his second season. This was followed by a foray into international management with the Greece national team, but he was dismissed less than four months later after a 1–0 home defeat against the Faroe Islands in the UEFA Euro 2016 qualifying.

Ranieri returned to England once more in the summer of 2015 as manager of Leicester City. He went on to win the 2015–16 Premier League, after the club had narrowly avoided relegation the season prior, and was named the 2016 Premier League Manager of the Season, and LMA Manager of the Year. He was also awarded the Grand Officer of the Italian Order of Merit and the Enzo Bearzot Award as the best Italian manager of the year, as well as the Best FIFA Men's Coach. He was dismissed by the club in February 2017 after a run of poor results. He has subsequently managed Nantes, Fulham, Roma, Sampdoria, and Watford. In June 2023, he won promotion to Serie A in a second spell with Cagliari, after beating Bari 1–2 in the playoffs. After leaving Cagliari, he announced his retirement from club management but reversed his decision to take charge of Roma for a third spell in November 2024, guiding them to an eventual fifth-place finish before taking up a senior advisory role at the club, which he held until April 2026.

== Personal life ==
Ranieri was born in San Saba, a neighbourhood of Rome near the Circus Maximus, and is a lifelong supporter of AS Roma. He began playing football at his neighbourhood church. A childhood friend described him as having a stereotypically English demeanour, in being quiet and reserved. He and his family live in Formello, a nearby town where 1982 FIFA World Cup–winning goalkeeper Dino Zoff is also among the residents.

Ranieri is married to Dr. Rosanna. Ranieri has a daughter, Claudia, who married Italian actor Alessandro Roja and gave Claudio a grandson and granddaughter, named Orlando and Dorotea. In May 2016, during his time as manager of Leicester City, he attracted media attention when he stated that he would be travelling to Rome to have lunch with his 96-year-old mother instead of watching the Chelsea–Tottenham Hotspur match; the match ended in a 2–2 draw, a result which ultimately awarded Ranieri his first ever Premier League title. He is a devout Catholic and prays daily, saying, "I am very close to God. I speak with him. If you can help me, thank you, If I don't deserve, OK, thank you the same."

== Playing career ==
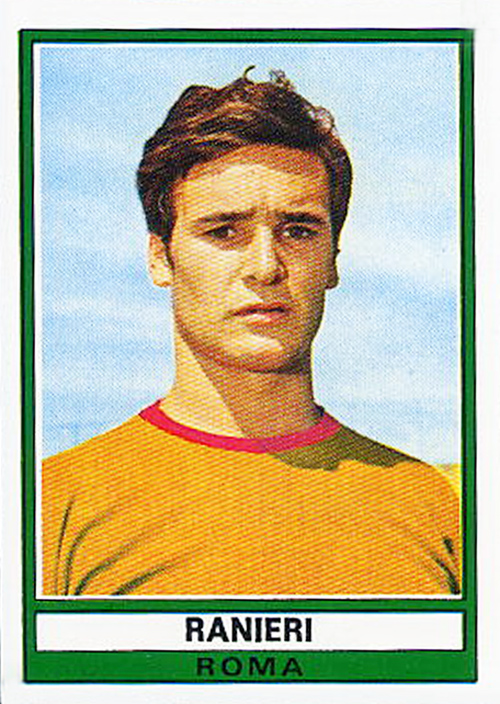
Ranieri with Roma, pictured on a football sticker from 1973

Ranieri first signed as a professional football player with Roma, though in his two seasons with the club he only made six appearances; he also had a one-month loan spell with Siracusa. As a player, Ranieri spent most of his career playing as a defender for Catanzaro (1974–1982), Catania (1982–1984), and Palermo (1984–1986). He was involved in four successful promotion campaigns (two with Catanzaro and one each with Catania and Palermo).

== Managerial career ==
=== Early years in Italy ===
His managerial career began in Vigor Lamezia, where he led them on a 12-match unbeaten run and took them to the top of the table. He later resigned for refusing to use the players that were brought by an agent close to the president. After initially coaching amateur side Vigor Lamezia, Ranieri's first managerial position was at Campania Puteolana, a small team in Pozzuoli. He took charge there in 1987. However, it was at Cagliari that he made his name as a manager. After joining the club in 1988, he helped the team to gain promotion to Serie A from the third division Serie C1 in successive seasons, also winning the Coppa Italia Serie C in 1989. At Cagliari, his team were known for their fluid tactical system, which enabled the team to change their shape and switch between different formations throughout the course of a single match.

From 1991, Ranieri managed for two seasons at Napoli, who were facing financial difficulties at the time. Despite finishing in fourth place in Serie A, and qualifying for the UEFA Cup, he won no silverware during his spell with the club. During his second season in charge of Napoli, he was dismissed by the club's owner at the time, Corrado Ferlaino, following the team's elimination in the second round of the UEFA Cup, despite the club's notable 5–1 away victory over Valencia in the first round of the tournament. He did, however, introduce Gianfranco Zola to the first team to replace the suspended star Diego Maradona, who had recently left the club, as well as Daniel Fonseca, whom he played alongside veteran striker Careca in the team's front line.

Ranieri joined Fiorentina in 1993, gaining promotion to Serie A after winning the 1993–94 Serie B title in his first season in charge of the Florence-based side. He subsequently had success in Serie A, winning the Coppa Italia and Supercoppa Italiana in 1996, and along with the offensive talents of Gabriel Batistuta, Rui Costa and Francesco Baiano, he helped the club to go on a 15-match unbeaten run during the 1995–96 Serie A season, which saw the team hold second place for several months behind league leaders Milan; Fiorentina lost five of their last nine league games, however, and eventually finished the season in fourth place. The next season was less successful, as Fiorentina finished in a disappointing ninth place in the league, although the team managed to reach the semi-finals of the 1996–97 UEFA Cup Winners' Cup, losing out to eventual champions Barcelona.

=== First spell in Spain ===
In 1997, Ranieri moved to Spain to take over at Valencia. He was the coach from 1997 to 1999 and guided Valencia to a fourth-place finish in La Liga, achieving UEFA Champions League qualification in 1999; he also won the UEFA Intertoto Cup in 1998, and the Copa del Rey in 1999. After his first spell, Ranieri left the club in 1999 a popular man, and has been credited for putting Valencia on the track to subsequent success in the Champions League and La Liga, despite initially sitting in the lower half of the table upon his arrival. Under Ranieri, Valencia were known for their efficiency and defensive solidity in his tactically rigorous 4–4–2 formation, as well as their use of high pressing to win back possession, and their ability to score from counter-attacks. He was responsible for the development of several youth players at the club, among them Claudio López, Gaizka Mendieta, Miguel Ángel Angulo and Javier Farinós. Ranieri also signed some players who would become highly successful at the Mestalla, among them goalkeeper Santiago Cañizares.

Ranieri subsequently signed for Atlético Madrid in 1999; during his time as the club's coach, the team went into administration and struggled on the pitch. Nearing the brink of relegation, Ranieri resigned before he could be dismissed by the Atlético president Jesús Gil, who was well known for dismissing coaches. Ranieri had a talented squad at his disposal containing such players as Jose Molina, Joan Capdevila, Ruben Baraja, Santiago Solari, Kiko, Juan Carlos Valeron and Jimmy Floyd Hasselbaink. Atlético would indeed go on to be relegated at the end of the season.

=== Chelsea ===
As head coach of Chelsea from 18 September 2000 to 30 May 2004, Ranieri worked hard to overcome the language barrier. When he arrived at the London club, he could speak only limited English; however, the club had a few players who could speak Italian and Spanish and could help translate for him on the training pitch. Ranieri's first season featured inconsistent results, with Chelsea reaching sixth place and a UEFA Cup spot. Ranieri had been instructed to reduce the average age of the squad, and worked to rebuild Chelsea in the summer of 2001, creating a brand new midfield by signing Frank Lampard from West Ham United, Emmanuel Petit and Boudewijn Zenden from Barcelona and Jesper Grønkjær from Ajax. He also signed defender William Gallas from Marseille, spending in total over £30 million.

Ranieri, however, was criticised both for selling fan favourite Dennis Wise and the fact that Chelsea's league performance did not improve much on the previous season. The club finished sixth once again but did reach the FA Cup Final, losing 2–0 to Arsenal. During the 2002–03 season and throughout his Chelsea days, Ranieri was accused of over-rotating his squad, picking up the nickname of "The Tinkerman" from the British media. Chelsea finished the season on a high, qualifying for the Champions League after beating Liverpool 2–1 on the last day of the season. Ranieri's achievement, coming after a close season where the club was in a difficult financial situation and the only arrival was Enrique de Lucas from Espanyol on a free transfer, was greatly appreciated by fans and the media alike.

When Chelsea were taken over by Russian billionaire Roman Abramovich in 2003, Ranieri was given a large transfer fund but also found his job under threat. Days after the takeover, Abramovich was spotted meeting with England national team manager Sven-Göran Eriksson. Although the club denied Eriksson would be taking over at the time, these rumours would haunt Ranieri's season. Ranieri spent £120 million on players in the summer of 2003. These signings included Irish winger Damien Duff for a then club record £17 million; English youngsters Wayne Bridge, Joe Cole and Glen Johnson; Argentine pair Juan Sebastián Verón and Hernán Crespo; Frenchman Claude Makélélé; and Romanian star Adrian Mutu. This investment resulted in the best league placing for the club in 49 years, as they finished runners-up in the Premier League to Arsenal, who had become the first side in over 100 years to go an entire league season unbeaten. This position automatically qualified Chelsea for the Champions League. The club also reached the semi-finals of the Champions League; Chelsea eliminated Arsenal en route, although Ranieri's position was weakened by the semi-final loss to Monaco, a result the manager himself was blamed for due to several bizarre substitutions and tactical changes.

That season saw Chelsea break club records for the fewest goals conceded and highest number of points in a season. On 31 May 2004, after almost one year of speculation, which included the club's well-publicized courting of Eriksson, he was finally relieved of his coaching duties at Chelsea, and his job went to José Mourinho, who had led Porto to successive European triumphs. The core of the Chelsea team which won two Premier League titles under Mourinho, including John Terry, William Gallas, Wayne Bridge, Claude Makélélé and Frank Lampard were all brought to Chelsea or nurtured by Ranieri. During his final months at Chelsea, Ranieri also identified Didier Drogba, Petr Čech and Arjen Robben as players Chelsea should sign, all of whom went on to become key players at the club.

Ranieri published in September 2004 a book named Proud Man Walking chronicling his last year at Chelsea. All proceeds went to London's Great Ormond Street Hospital.

=== Valencia ===
On 8 June 2004, Ranieri returned for a second stint as coach of Valencia on a three-year contract. Ranieri took over after Rafael Benítez, who had led Valencia to the UEFA Cup and La Liga double the previous season, resigned and then promptly joined Liverpool. Ranieri made a series of signings from Serie A, including Marco Di Vaio, Stefano Fiore, Bernardo Corradi and Emiliano Moretti. After a bright start, in which the Mestalla outfit picked up 14 out of a possible 18 points and beat Porto to lift the UEFA Super Cup, Valencia went into a slump starting in October. They won only once in seven matches and were eliminated from the Champions League, partly thanks to a 5–1 defeat to Inter Milan in which midfielder Miguel Ángel Angulo was sent off for spitting. After a brief revival, Valencia went another six matches without a win beginning mid-January. Apart from the unpopularity of his four Italian signings, Ranieri was criticised for not playing Argentine playmaker Pablo Aimar and for persistent changes to formations and tactics, something resembling his Chelsea days. He was dismissed on 25 February 2005 after Valencia were eliminated from the UEFA Cup by Steaua București. Valencia were sixth in La Liga at the time of Ranieri's dismissal. Quique Sánchez Flores was announced by Valencia in June 2005 to be Ranieri's long-term successor. Prior to that, Ranieri received £3 million in compensation from Valencia for the early termination of his contract.

=== Parma ===
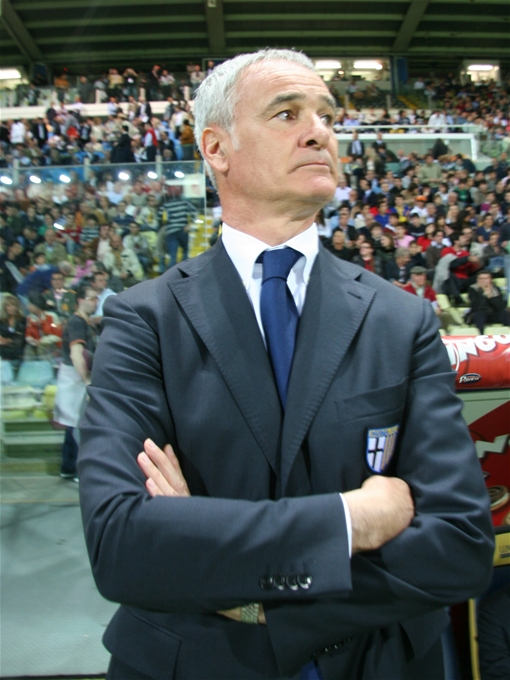
Ranieri with Parma in 2007

On 12 February 2007, one day after the 23rd Serie A matchday, Ranieri was announced as the new Parma manager following the dismissal of Stefano Pioli. He lost his first game in charge against Sampdoria 1–0, but subsequently managed to make several impressive results to help Parma in the relegation battle, obtaining 17 points in 10 matches (to be compared to his predecessor's 15 points in 23 matches), including a 4–3 unexpected away win at Palermo which prompted the rosanero to dismiss their coach Francesco Guidolin. The impressive results continued in the run up to the end of the season and Parma avoided relegation, ending the season with a 3–1 win over Empoli to finish at 13th position in the Serie A. The team started to hit some impressive goal-scoring form as well, seen in the 4–1 thrashing of Messina in early May. After helping Parma escape from relegation, Ranieri was linked with several managing jobs, including Fulham, Manchester City, and Palermo. On 16 May 2007, William Hill suspended betting on him becoming Manchester City manager following a flurry of betting activity. On 31 May, Parma announced Ranieri would not be the club's manager for the following season.

=== Juventus ===
On 4 June 2007, Ranieri took over at Juventus. He signed a three-year contract with the club. The deal took effect on 1 July 2007. Ranieri signed names such as Vincenzo Iaquinta from Udinese and Zdeněk Grygera from Ajax. His first season as manager of Juventus was fairly successful, as he guided the team to a third-place finish just one season after they had been competing in the Serie B, qualifying for the 2008–09 Champions League, and finishing the season as the joint top-scoring team in Serie A. In August 2008, Ranieri engaged in a war of words with new Inter manager José Mourinho, who had replaced him four years earlier at Chelsea. Mourinho criticised Ranieri for his old-fashioned mentality, and for failing to win an important title as a manager in his career; this led to a temporary feud between the two managers. He highlighted Inter as the strongest threat to Juventus in Serie A.

Juventus began the season strongly, defeating Spanish champions Real Madrid in both their first-round legs of the Champions League to top their group, although the Turin-based club eventually fell to Ranieri's former team, Chelsea, in the round of 16. After Juventus struggled with injuries and failed to register a win in seven matches during a two-month period, which left the team in third place after a 2–2 home draw with Atalanta, he was said to have been under real pressure to maintain his job as head coach with many supporters of the club publicly criticising the team and in particular Ranieri. Speculation ended when, after having an emergency board meeting on 18 May 2009, the board dismissed Ranieri after Inter were confirmed Serie A champions. He was replaced by youth system chief Ciro Ferrara. Ranieri had also led Juventus to the Coppa Italia semi-finals that season, where they were eliminated by Lazio, who went on to win the title. Juventus finished the league season in second place, one position better than the previous season.

=== Roma ===
On 1 September 2009, Ranieri was signed as the new manager of Roma on a two-year contract, succeeding Luciano Spalletti, who had resigned that day after opening the 2009–10 Serie A season with two defeats. Thus, Rome-born Ranieri became head coach of the football club which he had supported since childhood. Under his guidance, Roma dramatically improved their performances and thrust themselves into the championship battle, reducing the gap between themselves and leaders Inter to only one point after Ranieri's team defeated Mourinho's Nerazzurri on matchday 31. Roma then went on to win two more games consecutively and overtook Inter by matchday 33, thanks to a 2–1 home win against Atalanta and Inter's 2–2 draw against Fiorentina. This left the Giallorossi on top of the table with five games remaining. Roma then extended its unbeaten run to 23 matches, and also maintained first place in the league table by winning a heated derby against crosstown rivals Lazio, extending the club's unbeaten run to 24 matches. Ranieri was hailed by the press for substituting local heroes Francesco Totti and Daniele De Rossi during half-time, while Roma was losing 1–0; the Giallorossi then won the match 2–1 after two second-half goals from Mirko Vučinić. Roma, however, would surrender their lead in Serie A and also lose the Coppa Italia final, in both cases to treble-winning Inter. Following Roma's 1–0 defeat in the Coppa Italia final, Inter boss Mourinho publicly mocked Ranieri, as he had reportedly showed his team the film Gladiator before the match, in order to motivate his players.

The following season, Ranieri suffered yet another defeat to Inter in the 2010 Supercoppa Italiana. The season started off poorly for Roma and saw Ranieri clash with team captain Totti, who was critical of being left out of the team and of his coach's defensive tactics and constant changes to the starting line-up. Although the club's form later improved, Ranieri resigned as manager on 20 February 2011, after a poor run of results. His final game in charge was a 4–3 defeat to Genoa, in which Roma surrendered a 3–0 lead.

=== Inter Milan ===
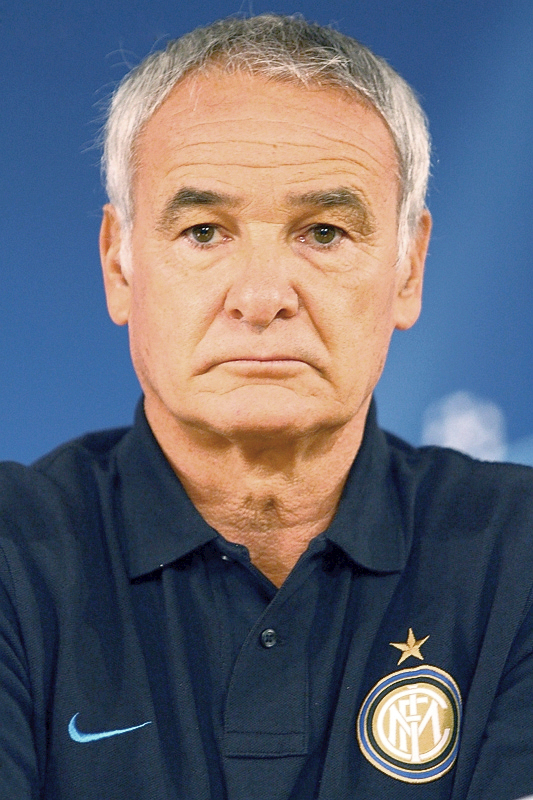
Ranieri with Inter Milan in 2011

On 22 September 2011, Ranieri was named as the new manager of Inter, replacing Gian Piero Gasperini, who was dismissed for poor performances after losing four out of five matches. He signed a contract with the club until 30 June 2013. The Nerazzurri managed to win 3–1 in Ranieri's debut against Bologna on 24 September; this was the first competitive win for the team in all tournaments since the beginning of the season, and was followed by a 3–2 Champions League away win at CSKA Moscow. A run of seven consecutive Serie A wins in December 2011 and January 2012, including a 1–0 victory over cross-city rivals Milan, suddenly had them talking of challenging for the title.

Thereafter, Inter suffered a poor run of results (which also saw the departure of Thiago Motta to Paris Saint-Germain) and their Champions League hopes were hanging by a thread after being beaten by Marseille 1–0 in the round of 16 first leg match. Speculation was growing that Ranieri would be dismissed soon, reaching its peak during half-time of the Serie A match with Catania, but it died down after a 2–0 away win over Chievo. On 26 March 2012, however, following a 0–2 defeat against Juventus and after a run of just two wins in their last 13 games and eventual elimination by Marseille in the Champions League, Ranieri was dismissed.

=== Monaco ===
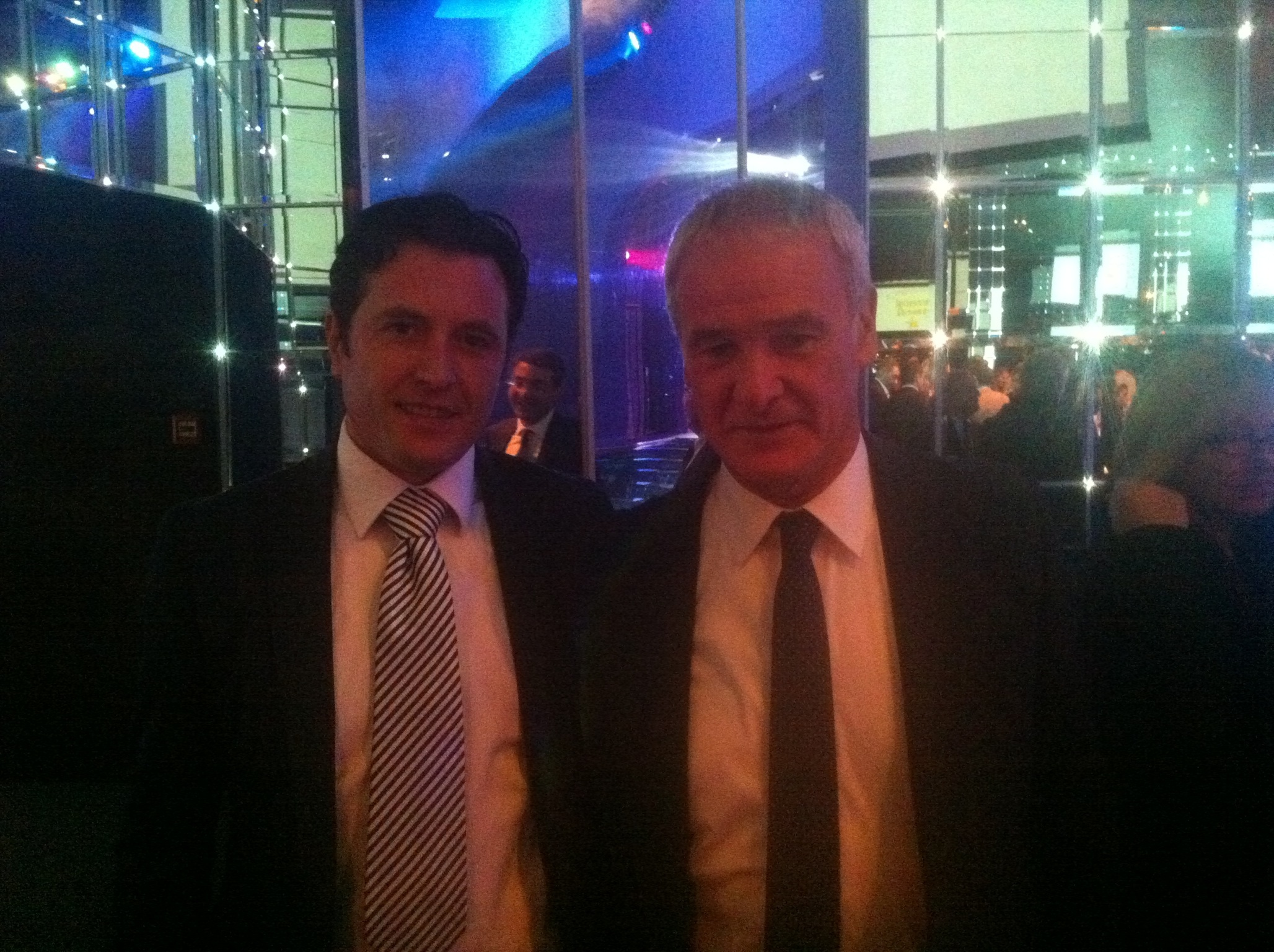
Ranieri (right) in November 2012

On 30 May 2012, Ranieri signed a two-year contract with Ligue 2 club Monaco. Ranieri led Monaco to promotion to Ligue 1, with the club winning the Ligue 2 championship title for the first time in its history. The following season, Ranieri led Monaco to second place in the 2013–14 Ligue 1 – behind champions Paris Saint-Germain – after finishing the season with 80 points. On 20 May 2014, his contract as Monaco manager was not renewed.

=== Greece ===
Ranieri was appointed manager of the Greek national team, following the departure of Fernando Santos after the 2014 FIFA World Cup; Ranieri signed a two-year contract worth €1.6 million. Compared to their previous stability under Otto Rehhagel and Santos, Ranieri often changed line-ups and formations, confusing the players; moreover, he did not live in Greece. He was dismissed on 15 November 2014, the day after a UEFA Euro 2016 qualifying 1–0 defeat at home against the Faroe Islands. He received €800,000 in compensation for his termination.

He reflected in a 2015 interview with the Leicester Mercury:

I made a mistake when I was manager of Greece. I wanted to look because it is a different job at a club to a national team. I had four matches and for each game I trained the players for just three days. That is 12 days of training. What can I do in just 12 days? I had to rebuild a national team in just 12 days. What could I do? I am not a magician.

=== Leicester City ===
==== First season ====
On 13 July 2015, Leicester City announced Ranieri as the club's new manager on a three-year contract. His appointment was initially met with scepticism; Marcus Christenson of The Guardian called it "baffling", given Ranieri's frequent recent dismissals and Greece's loss to the Faroe Islands. Christenson highlighted that Ranieri's good humour would be the antithesis to the short-tempered outbursts of his predecessor Nigel Pearson, concluding: "If Leicester wanted someone nice, they've got him. If they wanted someone to keep them in the Premier League, then they may have gone for the wrong guy."

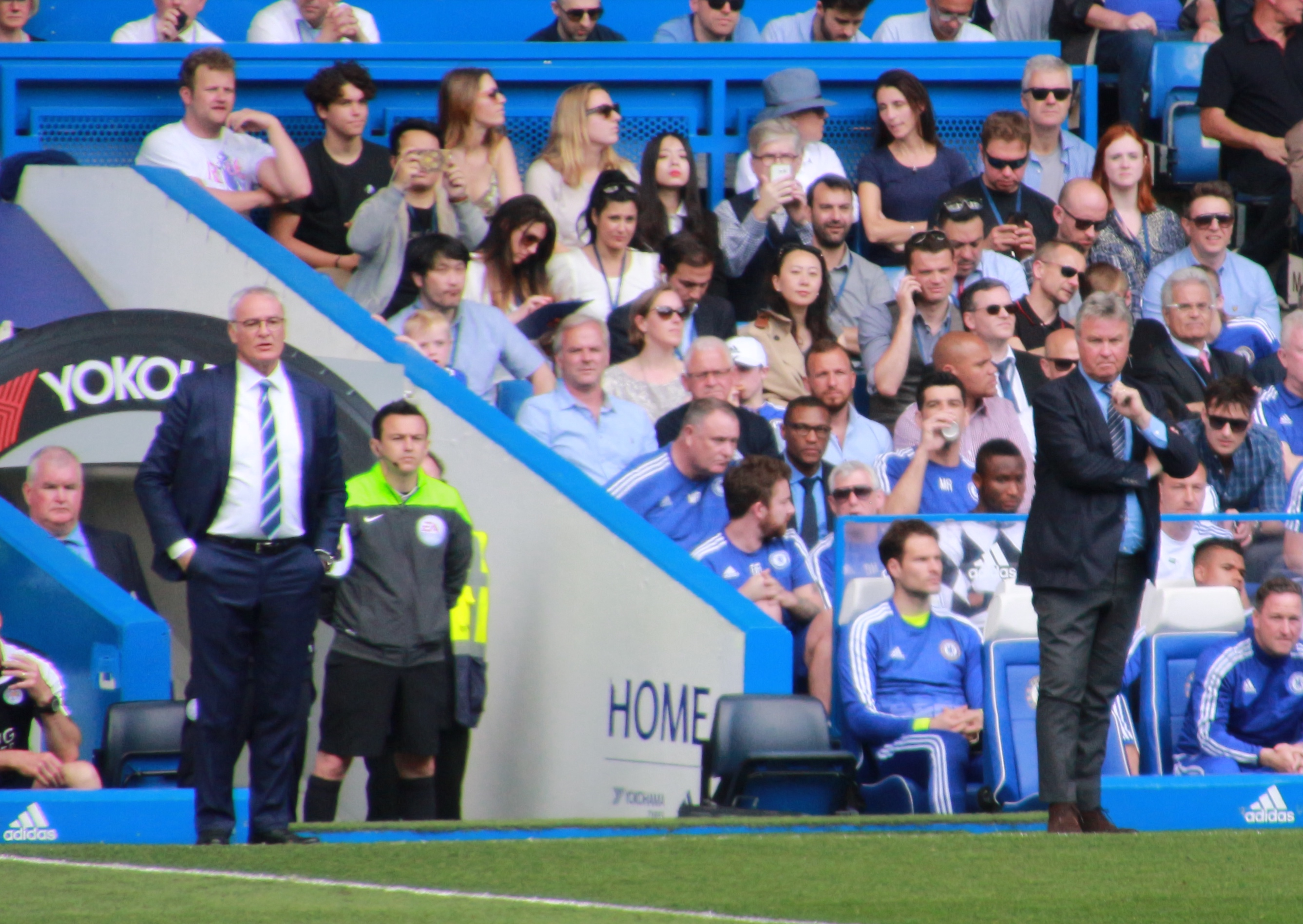
Ranieri (left) on the touchline with Guus Hiddink, manager of Chelsea, during a Premier League match

Ranieri's managerial debut with the club came in a 4–2 win over Sunderland on the opening match of the season on 8 August. After the match, Ranieri told the media that he inspired the team to win by giving them motivation from local rock band Kasabian. Following Leicester's first clean sheet of the 2015–16 Premier League season, which came in the club's tenth fixture, in a 1–0 home win against Crystal Palace on 24 October, Ranieri attracted further media attention when he rewarded his players by taking the team out for pizza and having champagne. The strong start of the season saw the club at the top of the Premier League at Christmas, having scored in each of their first 17 games. During this run, striker Jamie Vardy broke the Premier League record by scoring in eleven consecutive league matches, a run Ranieri compared to Gabriel Batistuta's during the 1994–95 season, while Ranieri was his manager at Fiorentina.

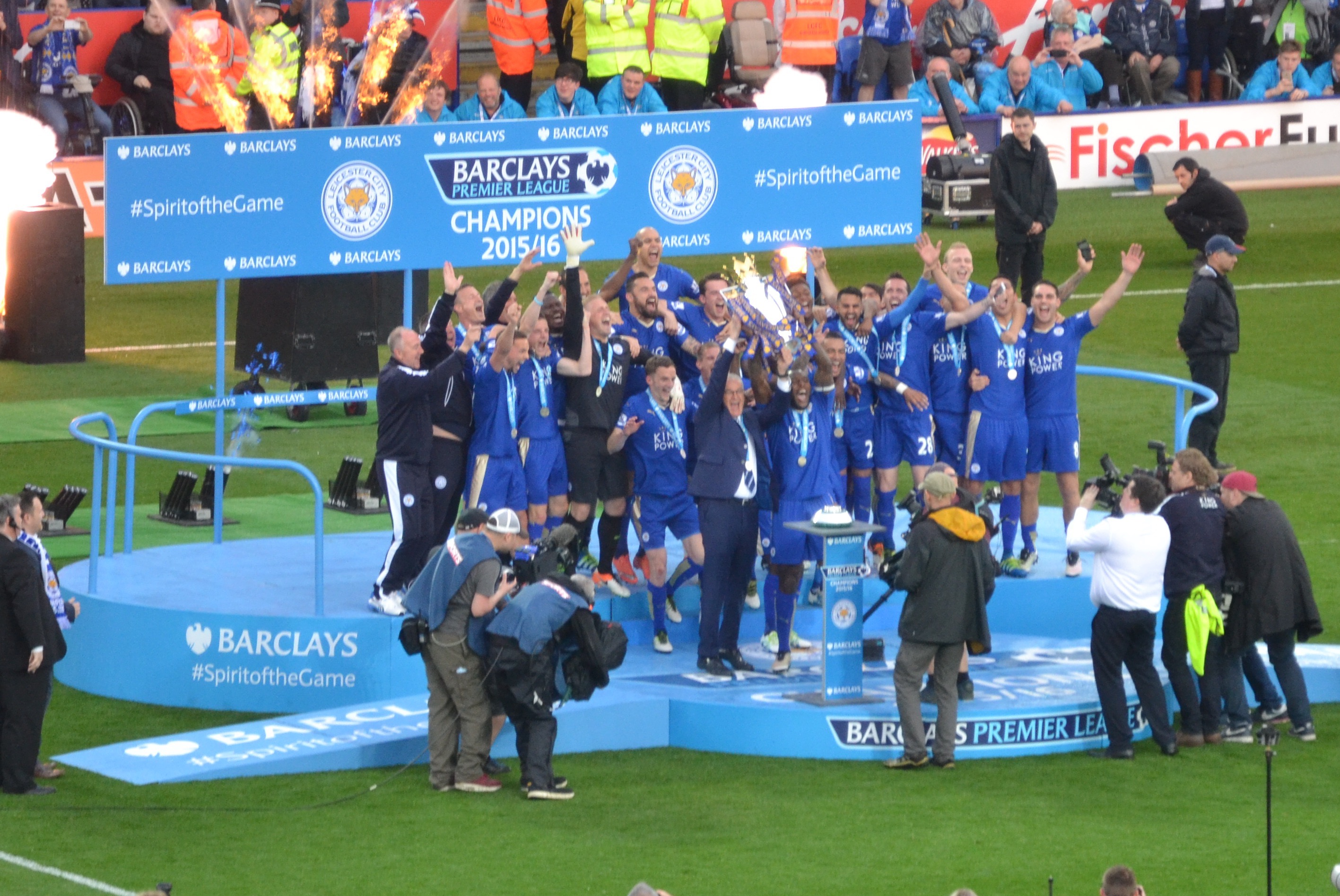
Ranieri and Wes Morgan lifting the Premier League trophy after the 2015–16 season

In March 2016, Ranieri's quips attracted media attention again when he stated in an interview that he used an "imaginary bell" in training in order to keep his players focused, by saying "dilly ding, dilly dong"; the quote later gained popularity and became a club catchphrase. Leicester's change of form led the BBC to compare the world media attention brought to Leicester by Ranieri with that achieved by the discovery of the remains of Richard III of England.

Leicester entered April at the summit of the Premier League and on 10 April 2016, they clinched a spot in the 2016–17 Champions League after a 2–0 away win over Sunderland. Despite pressure from the chasing teams, Leicester maintained their lead at the top of the table throughout April and entered May knowing they only needed three points to lift the Premier League trophy. Leicester played a hotly contested 1–1 draw against Manchester United at Old Trafford on 1 May, earning them a crucial point. This meant Tottenham Hotspur had to win their next game against Chelsea to stay in the title race. After Ranieri's appointment had been questioned in the media, barely avoiding relegation the previous season, and starting the 2015–16 Premier League campaign as 5,000–1 outsiders to win the title, Leicester City clinched the Premier League title the following day, after second-place club Tottenham could only manage a 2–2 draw against Chelsea, despite leading 2–0 at half-time. This was the first time the club had won the title in their 132-year history. The team's success was described as a "fairytale" and the "most unlikely triumph in the history of team sport". In spite of Ranieri's previous "Tinkerman" nickname, Leicester consistently played the same line-up under his stewardship, using fewer players than any other team. With Leicester, Ranieri reverted to his preferred 4–4–2 formation, which made use of heavy pressing, defensive organisation and fast counter-attacks.

Throughout the season, Ranieri drew praise from the media for his good humour and inspirational leadership at Leicester, and for successfully building a winning mentality and a successful team environment, while also being singled out for his tactical awareness and for frequently taking the pressure off his players. His title success led some in the media to dub him "King Claudio".

On the last day of the season, Leicester played at Chelsea, who gave them the ceremonial guard of honour. Carlo Cudicini, an Italian goalkeeper who played for Chelsea under Ranieri, presented him with a special award on behalf of the club, as Leicester finished the season with a 1–1 away draw. On 16 May, Ranieri was named Manager of the Year for 2016 by the League Managers' Association, and on 18 May, he was named the 2016 Barclays Premier League Manager of the Season. He was also awarded Grand Officer of the Italian Order of Merit and the Enzo Bearzot Award as best Italian manager of the year.

==== Second season ====
On 7 August 2016, Leicester began the 2016–17 season with a 2–1 defeat to Manchester United in the 2016 FA Community Shield. The start to Ranieri's second Premier League season with Leicester was less successful: by late November, the team had lost six of their opening twelve Premier League matches, conceded 20 goals while only scoring 14, and were in 14th place in the table, only two points above the relegation zone. Furthermore, Leicester had only won three matches in total, and had only managed to obtain one point away from home. Pundits opined that the team was unable to foster the same mentality that won them the title the previous season, and that N'Golo Kanté's departure to Chelsea, Vardy's goal drought, Leicester's opponents' different tactical approaches and the additional commitment of playing in the Champions League were the reasons for the club's sudden drop in form.

Despite their struggles in the league, however, the start to the club's first ever Champions League campaign was more successful: Leicester won their first three matches, while also keeping four consecutive clean sheets; following a 2–1 win over Club Brugge on 22 November, Leicester managed to top their group with 13 points and qualify for the knock-out round unbeaten with one match to spare, ahead of Porto and Copenhagen. In December, Ranieri was named as one of the three finalists for the 2016 Best FIFA Men's Coach; he won the award on 9 January 2017.

On 23 February 2017, Ranieri was dismissed by Leicester, with the club one point above the relegation zone with 13 matches remaining in the 2016–17 Premier League season. After a first leg 2–1 away loss to Sevilla in the Champions League round of 16, it was reported by the media that senior players had been summoned to meet the Leicester City chairman Vichai Srivaddhanaprabha, and that the outcome of the meeting had sealed Ranieri's fate. However, caretaker manager Craig Shakespeare and players denied that a player revolt had led to Ranieri's dismissal. The action was described as a "panic decision" and "wrong" by Gary Lineker, who said he had shed a tear when he heard the news. Graeme Souness commented that while Ranieri had probably treated the players the same way as last year, the players had "allowed themselves to get into the armchair"; while Ranieri had paid the price for a poor season, the players were to blame. Leicester's first match without Ranieri was a return-to-form 3–1 win over Liverpool; the supporters showed loyalty to the players, but at the 65th minute torches and banners supporting Ranieri were held aloft, the largest one having a picture of Ranieri with the message "Grazie Claudio" ("Thank you, Claudio").

=== Soccer Aid ===
In April 2016, it was announced that Ranieri would manage the Rest of the World team at Soccer Aid, a charity football match in aid of UNICEF and held at Old Trafford, Manchester, on 5 June. The Rest of the World team lost 3–2 to an England team comprising former professional players and celebrities.

=== Nantes ===
On 15 June 2017, Nantes announced Ranieri as the club's new manager. Ahead of Nantes' final game of the 2017-18 season, it was announced that Ranieri would leave the club following its conclusion.

=== Fulham ===
On 14 November 2018, Ranieri was appointed as the manager of Fulham, replacing Slaviša Jokanović. On 24 November, his first match as the club's new manager, he led Fulham to a dramatic 3–2 home win against Southampton, which put an end to Fulham's winless run in the league since 22 September. Ranieri was dismissed as the manager of Fulham and replaced by then assistant manager Scott Parker on 28 February 2019, having won only three of his 17 matches in charge. Coincidentally, Jokanović had been Ranieri's first signing for Chelsea and Parker had been his last.

=== Return to Roma ===
On 8 March 2019, Ranieri came back to Roma after eight years. He signed a contract which kept him at Roma until the end of the 2018–19 season, but with a possibility to extend the contract at the end of the season. In his first game back at Roma on 11 March, he led his team to a 2–1 home win over Empoli. In his final match for the club, on 26 May, he helped Roma to a 2–1 home win over Parma, but Roma ultimately missed out on a Champions League spot.

=== Sampdoria ===
On 12 October 2019, Ranieri signed a contract with Sampdoria, which would see him remain as the club's manager until 2021; at the time of his appointment, the team were sitting in last place in Serie A. He guided them to fifteenth place at the end of the season. Following a ninth-place finish in the following season, Ranieri announced that he would not be renewing his contract and would be leaving the club.

=== Watford ===
On 4 October 2021, Watford announced Ranieri as their new head coach on a two-year contract. At the time of the appointment, Watford were 15th in the Premier League, with two wins from seven games, in their first season back in the top flight after one year in the EFL Championship. Despite having achieved some notable results, including a 2–5 defeat of Everton at Goodison Park and a 4–1 victory over Manchester United, Ranieri was dismissed on 24 January 2022, following a run of poor results that left the club sitting in the relegation zone.

=== Return to Cagliari ===
On 23 December 2022, Serie B promotion hopefuls Cagliari announced the appointment of Ranieri as their new head coach, effective from 1 January 2023; this marked Ranieri's return in charge of the Sardinian club, his previous stint having been between 1988 and 1991 and being characterized by two consecutive promotions from Serie C to Serie A. After guiding Cagliari to fifth place in the regular season, Ranieri eventually succeeded in leading the Sardinians to promotion to Serie A, after defeating Bari in a two-legged final, thanks to an injury-time goal by Leonardo Pavoletti, thus marking his second promotion to the top flight with the Rossoblu.

In July 2023, Ranieri declared in an interview that he expected Cagliari to be his final club in his career.

On 19 May 2024, Ranieri's Cagliari defeated Sassuolo 2–0 away from home on the penultimate match-day of the 2023–24 Serie A season, which meant they mathematically avoided relegation to Serie B. Two days later, on 21 May 2024, Ranieri announced he would step down as coach after the final matchday, also confirming Cagliari would be his final coaching club. He later said he may only consider offers from national teams, while closing the door for clubs. He made his final club appearance as coach on 23 May, in a 3–2 home defeat to Fiorentina, on the last day of the Serie A season; he was given a standing ovation by the crowd before the match. This was Ranieri's 912th appearance as a manager in one of Europe's top five leagues, since making his Serie A debut as a coach in 1990–91; during this period, only Arsène Wenger totaled more top-flight league appearances as a coach (988). Cagliari finished the season in 16th place, with 36 points.

=== Second return to Roma ===
On 13 November 2024, it was reported that Ranieri was in talks with Roma to end his retirement and return to the club. He was officially announced as the new head coach of the club the next day.

After an impressive 19-game unbeaten run, Ranieri reignited Roma's push for Champions League qualification. A 2–1 away loss to Atalanta on matchday 36 was a major setback, but Roma bounced back with two consecutive wins as they ultimately finished the 2024–25 season in 5th place, just one point behind Juventus.

Following the season's end and the appointment of Gian Piero Gasperini as Roma's new head coach, the club officially promoted Ranieri to manager and senior advisor to the ownership. In the meantime, he turned down an opportunity to coach the Italian national team following the dismissal of Luciano Spalletti, choosing instead to continue in his role with Roma.

On 24 April 2026, he left his position as special adviser at the club.

== Executive career ==
=== Italy national team ===
On 28 July 2026, Ranieri was appointed technical director of the Italy national team. He also took on the role of president of Club Italia after Paolo Maldini resigned.

== Style of management ==
Ranieri's teams usually employ a tactically rigorous 4–4–2 formation, and are known for their fitness and work-rate, as well as their efficient and highly organised playing style, and for being compact both defensively and in midfield; his teams have drawn praise in the media for their defensive solidity, effective use of heavy pressing to win back possession, and their ability to score from quick counter-attacks. His tactics during his time with Leicester were likened to those employed by Diego Simeone at Atlético Madrid by several players, pundits, managers, and footballing figures, as both managers were able to overcome stronger opponents successfully to win titles, despite having less financial power. In addition to his tactical acumen, Ranieri has also drawn praise as a manager for his leadership, good humour, and his ability to both motivate and alleviate pressure on his players, thus fostering a winning mentality and a good team spirit; he has frequently used several unorthodox methods throughout his career in order to inspire his squads, with mixed success, while his quips have also made him a popular figure with the media.

Throughout his career, Ranieri has also drawn criticism for over-rotating his squad and modifying his tactics and formations excessively throughout the course of a season, which earned him the nickname "The Tinkerman" in the British media. Although his preferred system is the 4–4–2, he has also been known to use other systems, such as a back-five (either in a 5–3–2 or a 5–4–1 formation), a 4–3–1–2, a 3–4–3 with a false-9, a 3–4–1–2, a 4–3–3, a "Christmas Tree" formation, or even a 4–2–4 on occasion.

In the past, Ranieri has also been accused of using "old-fashioned" and overly defensive tactical systems by pundits and other managers, and was criticised for his failure to win a major league title until he captured the Premier League title with Leicester in 2016. Nevertheless, it has been argued that Ranieri's relentless ability to transform foundations at various clubs over the decades is seen by football pundits as non-coincidental; with virtually every club that he had spent more than two years at, always improving in the years ensuing his departure- with many crediting him for laying foundations for future success (albeit to be had with the manager/coach that would replace or succeed him); the odd irony of this pattern being that in the title success with Leicester, the reverse happened.

== Managerial statistics ==
As of match played 25 May 2025

Managerial record by team and tenure
Team	Nat.	From	To	Record							
Team	Nat.	From	To	G	W	D	L	GF	GA	GD	Win %
Vigor Lamezia	(Italy)	28 May 1986	9 June 1987	30	21	8	1	44	12	+32	70.00
Puteolana	(Italy)	10 June 1987	25 January 1988	24	5	7	12	14	34	−20	20.83
Puteolana	(Italy)	9 May 1988	7 June 1988	4	0	1	3	3	11	−8	0.00
Cagliari	(Italy)	7 June 1988	31 May 1991	123	48	48	27	126	98	+28	39.02
Napoli	(Italy)	31 May 1991	22 November 1992	55	25	16	14	92	66	+26	45.45
Fiorentina	(Italy)	30 June 1993	3 June 1997	174	76	58	40	266	185	+81	43.68
Valencia	(Spain)	19 September 1997	27 June 1999	96	51	18	27	169	106	+63	53.13
Atlético Madrid	(Spain)	29 June 1999	3 March 2000	39	9	11	19	63	53	+10	23.08
Chelsea	(England)	18 September 2000	31 May 2004	199	107	46	46	358	197	+161	53.77
Valencia	(Spain)	16 June 2004	25 February 2005	36	15	9	12	48	41	+7	41.67
Parma	(Italy)	13 February 2007	31 May 2007	18	7	6	5	24	19	+5	38.89
Juventus	(Italy)	4 June 2007	18 May 2009	93	46	30	17	168	96	+72	49.46
Roma	(Italy)	2 September 2009	20 February 2011	84	47	16	21	140	103	+37	55.95
Inter Milan	(Italy)	22 September 2011	26 March 2012	35	17	5	13	46	42	+4	48.57
Monaco	(France)	30 May 2012	20 May 2014	88	51	26	11	152	77	+75	57.95
Greece	(Greece)	25 July 2014	15 November 2014	4	0	1	3	1	5	−4	0.00
Leicester City	(England)	13 July 2015	23 February 2017	81	36	22	23	119	105	+14	44.44
Nantes	(France)	15 June 2017	1 June 2018	41	15	10	16	44	48	−4	36.59
Fulham	(England)	14 November 2018	28 February 2019	17	3	3	11	16	34	−18	17.65
Roma	(Italy)	8 March 2019	27 May 2019	12	6	4	2	17	12	+5	50.00
Sampdoria	(Italy)	12 October 2019	30 June 2021	72	27	13	32	99	108	−9	37.50
Watford	(England)	4 October 2021	24 January 2022	14	2	1	11	17	34	−17	14.29
Cagliari	(Italy)	1 January 2023	23 May 2024	65	22	22	21	81	89	−8	33.85
Roma	(Italy)	14 November 2024	6 June 2025	36	22	7	7	61	32	+29	61.11
Total				1,439	658	387	394	2,168	1,607	+561	45.73

== Honours ==
=== Manager ===
Cagliari

- Serie C1: 1988–89
- Coppa Italia Serie C: 1988–89
- Serie B promotion: 1989–90, 2022–23

Fiorentina

- Serie B: 1993–94
- Coppa Italia: 1995–96
- Supercoppa Italiana: 1996

Valencia

- Copa del Rey: 1998–99
- UEFA Intertoto Cup: 1998
- UEFA Super Cup: 2004

Chelsea

- FA Cup runner-up: 2001–02

Roma

- Coppa Italia runner-up: 2009–10

Monaco

- Ligue 2: 2012–13

Leicester City

- Premier League: 2015–16

Individual

- Premier League Manager of the Season: 2015–16
- LMA Manager of the Year: 2015–16
- LMA Premier League Manager of the Year: 2015–16
- Premier League Manager of the Month: September 2003, March 2004, November 2015, March 2016, April 2016
- Enzo Bearzot Award: 2016
- Italian Football Hall of Fame: 2016
- Gazzetta Sports Awards Coach of the Year: 2016
- BBC Sports Personality of the Year Coach Award: 2016
- IFFHS World's Best Club Coach (Third place): 2016
- Golden Foot: 2016, as football legend
- The Best FIFA Men's Coach: 2016
- World Soccer Magazine World Manager of the Year: 2016
- ACF Fiorentina Hall of Fame: 2022
- Serie A Coach of the Month: February 2025

=== Orders ===
- 2nd Class / Grand Officer: Grande Ufficiale Ordine al Merito della Repubblica Italiana: 2016
- 1st Class: Palma d'Oro al Merito Tecnico: 2016

== See also ==
- List of English football championship-winning managers
- List of football managers with the most matches
