= Peer Carlsen =

Danish trade unionist

Peer Carlsen (born 19 October 1928) was a Danish trade unionist.

Born in Berlin, Carlsen grew up in Denmark and began his career at the Danish Confederation of Trade Unions (LO) in 1951. He moved to work at UNESCO in Paris in 1954, returning to the LO in 1963. In 1974, he was appointed as the deputy general secretary of the European Trade Union Confederation. The confederation's general secretary, Théo Rasschaert, resigned late in 1975, and on 1 January 1976 was appointed as acting general secretary. Another deputy general secretary, Kaare Sandegren, had also resigned, and the secretary Alfred Misslin had died, leaving the organisation in a difficult position.

Carlsen led the organisation of a congress in London, which for the first time set out ten goals for the confederation to pursue over the next three years. At the congress, Mathias Hinterscheid was elected as general secretary and Carlsen stood down, becoming an international consultant for the LO. He retired in 1986.

Trade union offices
Preceded by Théo Rasschaert	Acting General Secretary of the European Trade Union Confederation; 1976	Succeeded by Mathias Hinterscheid
