= Giovanni Bianchi (politician) =

Italian politician (1939–2017)

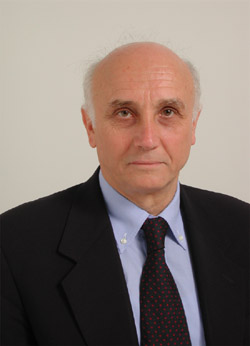

Chairman of the Italian People's Party
- In office 1994–1997
- Preceded by: Rosa Russo Iervolino
- Succeeded by: Gerardo Bianco

Member of the Chamber of Deputies
- In office 15 April 1994 – 27 April 2006
- Constituency: Lombardy

Personal details
- Born: 19 August 1939 Sesto San Giovanni
- Died: 24 July 2017 (aged 77)
- Party: Democratic Party
- Other political affiliations: The Daisy; Italian People's Party; Rebirth of Christian Democracy; Christian Democracy
- Education: Università Cattolica del Sacro Cuore
- Occupation: Politician, trade unionist
- Profession: Teacher

Giovanni Bianchi (19 August 1939 – 24 July 2017) was an Italian politician.

== Early life and career ==
Graduated in Political Science from the Catholic University of Milan, he was a teacher of philosophy and history in high schools.

== Politics ==
A democrat of Christian inspiration, he engaged in politics and the trade union. He was municipal councilor for the Christian Democracy in Sesto San Giovanni and dealt with school problems. He engaged in the ACLI and became the leader of the movement first at the regional level and then at the national level. He was elected president of the ACLI in 1987 and held the position until 1994.

In 1994 he resigned from the presidency of the ACLI and in the 1994 general elections he ran for the Italian People's Party (PPI) list.

Elected deputy, he was fielded by the left wing of the PPI as a candidate for the party secretariat on the occasion of the first congress in July 1994 as an alternative to the candidacy of Rocco Buttiglione. At the congress he presented a program with a strong reformist connotation, indicating for the PPI the path of an alternative to Silvio Berlusconi with the possibility of center-left alliances. However, during the last day of the congress, having verified that his candidacy did not collect sufficient consensus, he was replaced by Nicola Mancino who, however, failed to be elected secretary.

The new PPI secretary Rocco Buttiglione proposed him as party president, a position he accepted and held since the summer of 1994.

In the spring of 1995 he was at the forefront, as party president, in the dispute against Buttiglione who deployed the PPI in the centre-right with Silvio Berlusconi, without consulting the National Council. Bianchi led the internal protest together with Gerardo Bianco. The dispute led to the division of the party: the majority of Bianchi and Bianco chose the center-left alliance and kept the name of PPI, the minority kept the symbol of the crusader shield, allied itself with the centre-right and acquired the name of United Christian Democrats.

In 1995-1996 he led the party with Gerardo Bianco, leading it in the alliance of The Olive Tree. In the 1996 general elections he was re-elected deputy to the Chamber in the Sesto San Giovanni college. He was rapporteur of the law for the cancellation of the foreign debt of Third World countries.

In the 2001 general elections he was once again elected to the Chamber, always in the Sesto constituency, resulting one of the very few (4 in all) winners of the center-left in the single-member constituencies in Lombardy. He joined the group of The Daisy. In the 2006 general elections he was no longer re-nominated as he exceeded the limit of 3 terms in Parliament.

He was the regent commissioner of the city coordination of Sesto San Giovanni of The Daisy, while from 24 November 2007 he was the first provincial secretary of Milan of the Democratic Party.

He died on July 24, 2017.
