= Théo Rasschaert =

Théo Rasschaert (born 22 January 1927) is a Belgian former trade union leader.

Born in Deurne, Rasschaert was educated at the Athenée in Antwerp, and then at the city's Institut supérieur de commerce de l'Etat. He began working for the General Labour Federation of Belgium, initially in its studies department. From 1957 to 1958, he was part of the Belgian delegation negotiating the Treaty of Rome. In 1959, he became the secretary for economic questions and collective negotiations at the European Trade Union Secretariat, and then in 1967 became its general secretary. From 1969, he served as secretary of its replacement, the European Confederation of Free Trade Unions. In 1973, the European Trade Union Confederation was established, and Rasschaert became its general secretary. However, the British Trades Union Congress felt that he was reluctant to challenge the European Commission, and he resigned in 1975.

Trade union offices
Preceded by Harm Buiter	General Secretary of the European Trade Union Secretariat; 1967–1969	Succeeded by Organisation disestablished
Preceded by Organisation founded	General Secretary of the European Confederation of Free Trade Unions; 1969–1973	Succeeded by Organisation disestablished
Preceded by Organisation founded	General Secretary of the European Trade Union Confederation; 1973–1975	Succeeded by Peer Carlsen
