= Neutral Union of Luxembourg =

The Neutral Union of Luxembourg (Luxembourgish: Neutral Gewerkschaft Lëtzebuerg, NGL) was a general union in Luxembourg.

The union was founded in 1946, as a trade association for iron and steel workers, committed to political neutrality. In 1960, it registered as a trade union, and in 1984 it began admitting all workers, adopting the NGL name for the first time. By 1990, it had 5,000 members, but it had failed in its efforts to become a broader trade union confederation, hampered by internal conflicts, and the fact that it had failed to gain national-level recognition as a representative of manual workers. While the union remained neutral, it made Alternative Democratic Reform Party politician Gaston Gibéryen its honorary president.

In 2003, the union formed a new federation with the Luxembourg Association of Banking and Insurance Employees, the Union of Private Sector Employees, and the National Union of Private Sector Employees (SNEP), although it did not prove successful. In 2008, it merged with SNEP, forming NGL SNEP.
