= Vera Spautz =

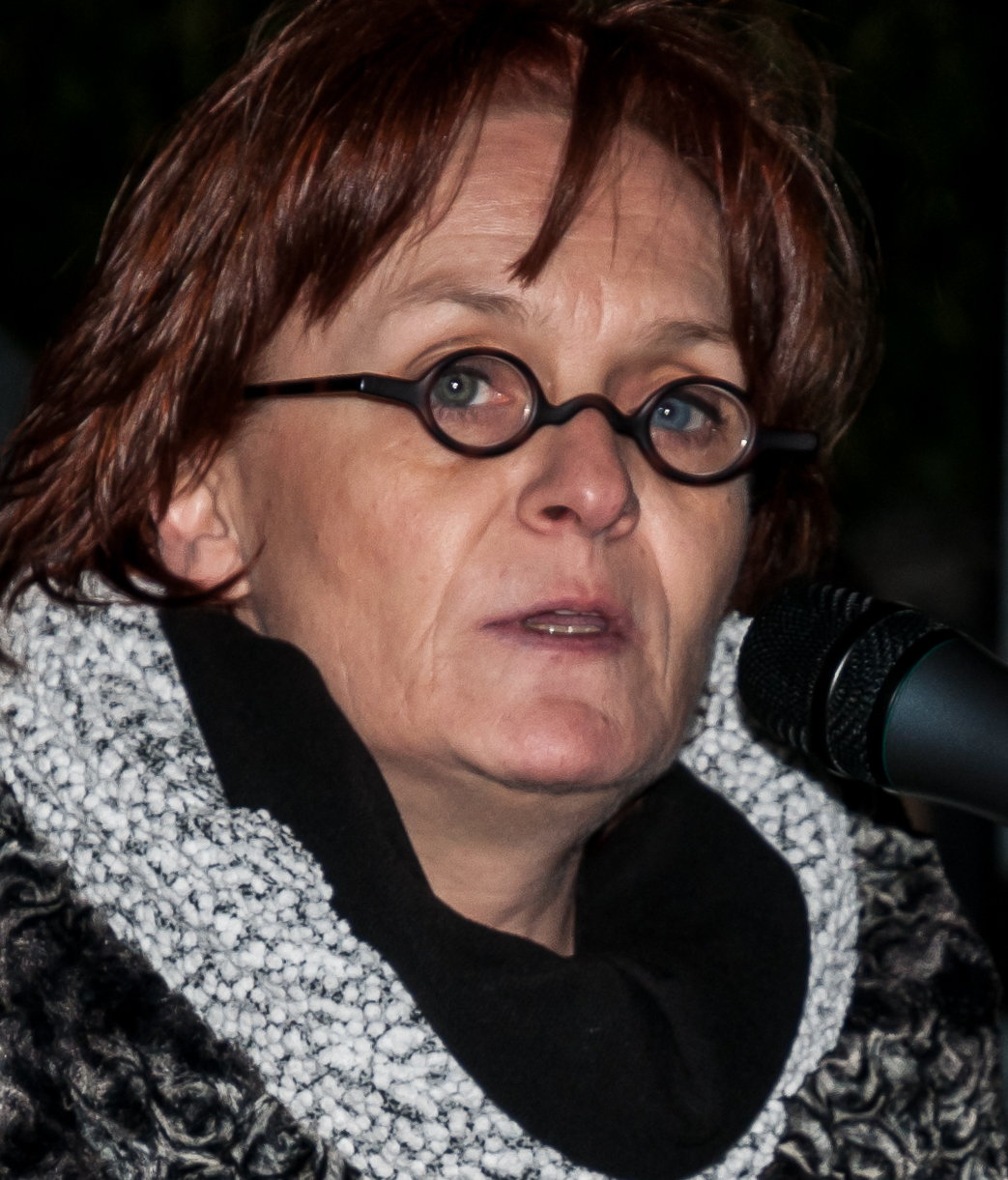
- Spautz in 2016

Mayor of Esch-sur-Alzette
- In office 4 December 2013 – 13 November 2017
- Monarch: Henri
- Preceded by: Lydia Mutsch
- Succeeded by: Georges Mischo

Member of the Chamber of Deputies
- In office 13 July 2004 – 15 November 2012
- Succeeded by: Roland Schreiner
- Constituency: South

Personal details
- Born: 1 May 1963 (age 63) Esch-sur-Alzette, Luxembourg
- Party: Luxembourg Socialist Workers' Party
- Occupation: Politician, Mayor, Trade Unionist

Vera Spautz (born 1 May 1963) is a Luxembourgish politician who served as the mayor of Esch-sur-Alzette and as a member of the Chamber of Deputies. Spautz was the second woman to be elected mayor of Esch-sur-Alzette.

== Career ==
In 1994, Spautz joined the Independent Luxembourg Trade Union Confederation (OGBL) as a vice-president and trade unionist. She worked in the role until 2004.

Spautz joined the Esch-sur-Alzette Municipal Council in 2000. She was a member of the Luxembourg Socialist Workers' Party (LSAP), joining officially in 1993. She served as an alderman and municipal councillor for 13 years.

Spautz was elected to the Luxembourg Chamber of Deputies to represent the Sud constituency in 2004. She served on the Labor and Employment Commission and Committee on Family, Youth and Equal Opportunities.

She served almost two full terms. Spautz resigned from the Chamber of Deputies in 2012 due to health issues and differences in opinion from the LSAP party platform.

Spautz replaced Lydia Mutsch as mayor of Esch-sur-Alzette when she became the Minister of Health for the Government Bettel-Schneider.

In 2018, Spautz and Ralph Waltmans successfully campaigned to get Esch-sur-Alzette as Luxembourg's candidate for 2022 European Capital of Culture. Esch-sur-Alzette was named the European Capital of Culture along with Kaunas, Lithuania and Novi Sad, Serbia.

LSAP lost the plurality of seats in the Esch-sur-Alzette Municipal Council during Spautz's mayoral term. She served one term and was replaced by Georges Mischo (Christian Social People's Party). Spautz returned to the city's municipal council.

In 2019, she faced controversy over her comments at a council meeting about Association of Doctors and Dentists (AMMD) beginning an out-of-hospital system. Spautz alleged that the AMMD were lobbyists, stated that she had no confidence in leadership, and expressed concerns about a "two-class system." AMMD claimed that Spautz "trie[d] to discredit the AMMD with lies, populist arguments fabricated to scare CHEM employees individual and citizens in general" an that "such an approach could be understood in a context of attempt to regain power in the Municipality of Esch/Alzette to the detriment of patients who are legitimately awaiting pragmatic political decisions taking into account the medical progress." Spautz claimed that AMMD's response had a "violent tone."

Spautz retired from politics in 2022.

Spautz served on the board of OGBL Women's Department, National Cheap Housing Corporation (SNHBM), and Émile-Mayrisch Hospital Center (CHEM). She is currently on the executive board of social policy non-profit Zarabina.
