= Harm Buiter =

Dutch trade unionist and politician

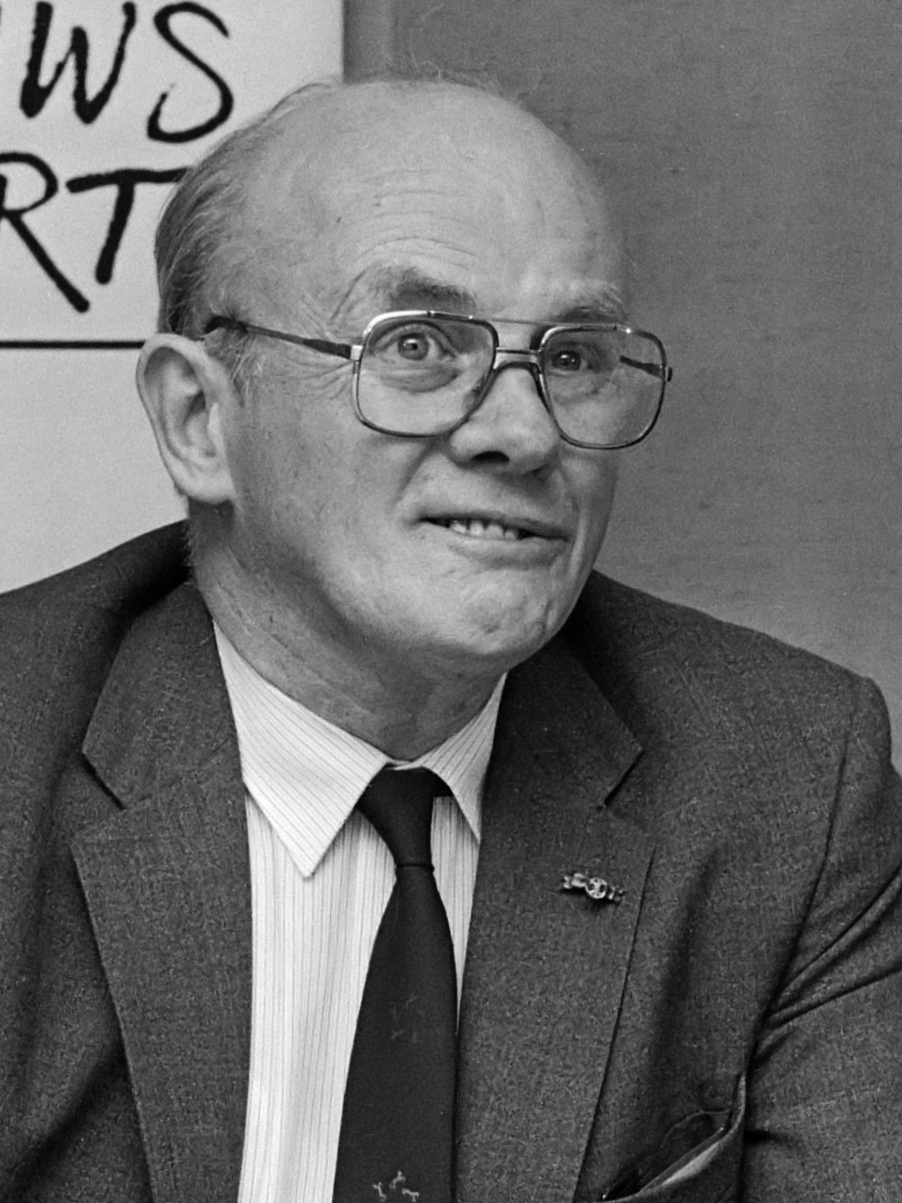
Buiter in 1984

Harm Geert Buiter (8 January 1922 – 22 February 2011) was a Dutch trade unionist and politician.

Born in Tubbergen in the Netherlands, Buiter studied economics in Amsterdam, but was expelled for anti-Nazi activity during World War II. After the war, he completed his studies in England, then in 1947 returned to the Netherlands to work for the General Dutch Metalworkers' Union. In 1956, he was appointed as secretary of the European Coal and Steel Community's trade union committee, then in 1958 became secretary of its successor, the European Trades Union Secretariat.

In 1967, Buiter was elected as general secretary of the International Confederation of Free Trade Unions, but he retired five years later due to poor health. He was elected as the Mayor of Groningen, serving until 1985.

Buiter's son, Willem, became a notable economist.

Trade union offices
Preceded by Organisation founded	General Secretary of the European Trade Union Secretariat; 1958–1967	Succeeded by Théo Rasschaert
Preceded by Omer Becu	General Secretary of the International Confederation of Free Trade Unions; 1967–1972	Succeeded by Otto Kersten
