= Luxembourg Association of Banking and Insurance Employees =

The Luxembourg Association of Banking and Insurance Employees (French: Association Luxembourgeoise des Employés des Banques et Assurances, ALEBA) is a trade union representing workers in the finance sector in Luxembourg.

The union was founded in 1918, and in 1920, it became part of the Federation of Private Employees (FEP). After World War II, the banking sector in Luxembourg grew rapidly, and the union's membership grew. In 1978, the union split away from the FEP and became an independent union again. Much of the leadership of the union left to join the new Independent Luxembourg Trade Union Confederation.

By 1990, 70% of workers in the finance sector in Luxembourg held membership of the union, which stood at about 10,000. In 2003, it formed a new federation with the Union of Private Sector Employees, the Neutral Union of Luxembourg, and the National Union of Private Sector Employees, although it did not prove successful.

In 2005, and in 2019, the union was recognised as the leading one in the sector, and able to negotiate on behalf of all finance sector employees in the country. However, this status was withdrawn in 2021, after the country's two trade union federation objected that only a minority of employees in the industry wished to be represented by the union.
