= Federation of Printing Workers of Luxembourg =

Luxembourg trade union

The Federation of Printing Workers of Luxembourg (French: Fédération luxembourgeoise des travailleurs du livre, FLTL) was a trade union representing workers in the printing and paper industries in Luxembourg.

The union was the first to be established in Luxembourg. It was founded on 31 July 1864, as the Typographical Association, on the initiative of Peter Klein. The strongest 19th-century trade union in the country, it achieved significant improvements in working conditions for its members. In 1893, it affiliated to the International Typographers' Secretariat.

The union played a leading role in establishing the first trade union confederation in the country, the Union Cartel. It later joined the General Confederation of Labour of Luxembourg. It began admitting all workers in the printing and paper industries in 1945, and accordingly changed its name to the FLTL, but remained small, with only 400 members in 1965.

By 1989, the union had grown to 1,000 members. On 9 December 2005, it merged into the Independent Luxembourg Trade Union Confederation.
