= National Federation of Railway Workers, Transport Workers, Civil Servants and Employees of Luxembourg =

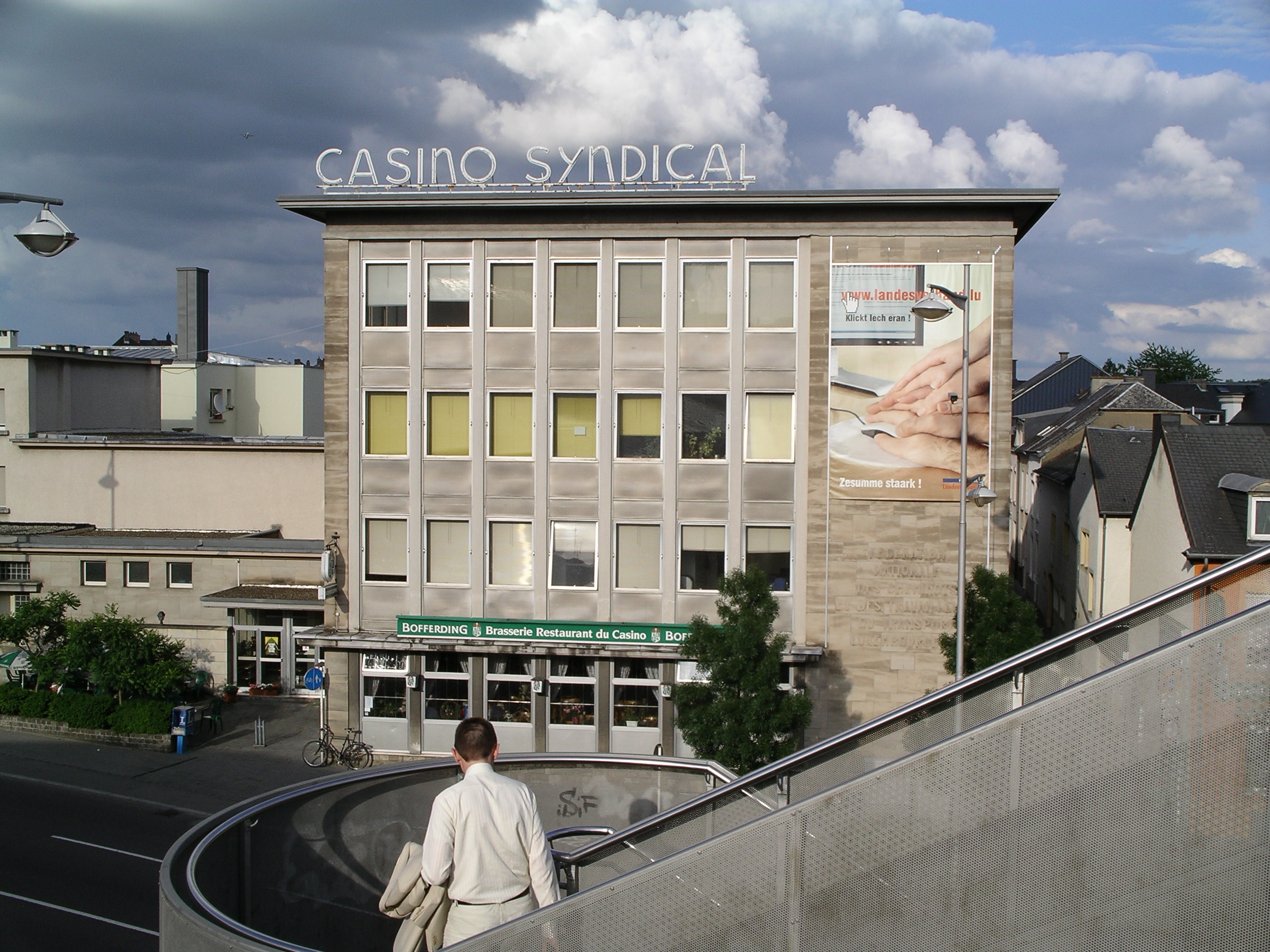
Railway trade union, Luxembourg-Bonnevoie, Luxembourg

The National Federation of Railway Workers, Transport Workers, Civil Servants and Employees of Luxembourg (French: Fédération nationale des cheminots, travailleurs du transport, fonctionnaires et employés luxembourgeois, FNCTTFEL; Luxembourgish: Landsverband) was a trade union representing workers in the public sector and transportation in Luxembourg.

== History ==
The union was founded in 1909 as the General Union of Railway Workers of Luxembourg. In 1955, it began representing road transport workers, and became the Federation of Luxembourg Railway and Transport Workers. In 1963, it absorbed the National Federation of Employees, and also the Federation of Prison Wardens of Luxembourg. By 1965, it had 10,000 members.

The union was an founding affiliate of the General Confederation of Labour of Luxembourg (CGTL), and remained so for the rest of its existence. By 2020, it was one of only two remaining affiliates of the CGTL. That year, it agreed to merge into the other affiliate, the Independent Luxembourg Trade Union Confederation, becoming its transport workers' section.

== Presidents ==
1909: Joseph Junck
1922: Aloyse Kayser
1926: Michel Hack
1944: Maurice Leick
1955: Albert Bousser
1964: Alphonse Hildgen
1976: Jeannot Schneider
1985: Josy Konz
1998: Nico Wennmacher
2009: Guy Greivelding
2017: Georges Merenz
