= Christian Associations of Italian Workers =

The Christian Associations of Italian Workers (Associazioni Cristiane dei Lavoratori Italiani, ACLI; alternatively translated as Italian Christian Workers' Association) are a widespread lay Catholic association in Italy. Its work is based on the Catholic social teaching.

The ACLI were founded in 1944 in reaction to the decision by Catholic trade unionists to take part to the foundation of the unitary Italian General Confederation of Labour (CGIL). In 1948 ACLI leaders contributed to the foundation of the Italian Confederation of Workers' Trade Unions (CISL), a Christian-oriented split from the CGIL, which had come under Communist influence. The ACLI first leader, Achille Grandi, was a Christian Democratic member of the Constituent Assembly.

During the leadership of Livio Labor (1961–1969), who would later form a left-wing party named Workers' Political Movement (MPL) and be elected senator for the Italian Socialist Party (PSI) in 1976, the ACLI broke their ties with the DC. Under Emilio Gabaglio (1969–1972), who proposed a "socialist ipothesis", the ACLI went further to the left. Gabaglio was criticized by Labor and the ACLI, which suffered the split of the Workers Christian Movement in 1970, were deplored by Pope Paul VI in 1971. Under Marino Carboni (1972–1976) the ACLI made "peace" with the Catholic hierarchy and re-established their "collateralism" with the DC.

The ACLI used to have great influence on Italian society and politics. Most of their leaders played an active role in politics. In 1994, when the DC was dissolved, most ACLI members joined the Italian People's Party (PPI), with the notable exceptions of Gabaglio and Franco Passuello (1994–1998), who joined the Social Christians (CS) and later the Democrats of the Left (DS). Giovanni Bianchi (1987–1994) was the president of the PPI from 1994 to 1997. More recently, Luigi Bobba (1998–2006) was elected senator for the Democratic Party (PD), the party born in 2007 upon the union of Democracy is Freedom – The Daisy (DL), in which the PPI was merged in 2002, with the DS, while Andrea Olivero (2006–2013) was successively active in Civic Choice (SC), the Populars for Italy (PpI) and Solidary Democracy (DemoS).

== Leadership ==
- Presidents: Achille Grandi (1944–1945), Ferdinando Storchi (1945–1954), Dino Penazzato (1954–1960), Ugo Piazzi (1960–1961), Livio Labor (1961–1969), Emilio Gabaglio (1969–1972), Marino Carboni (1972–1976), Domenico Rosati (1976–1987), Giovanni Bianchi (1987–1994), Franco Passuello (1994–1998), Luigi Bobba (1998–2006), Andrea Olivero (2006–2013), Gianni Bottalico (2013–2016), Roberto Rossini (2016–2021), Emiliano Manfredonia (2021–present).
