= Emilio Gabaglio =

Italian politician (1937–2024)

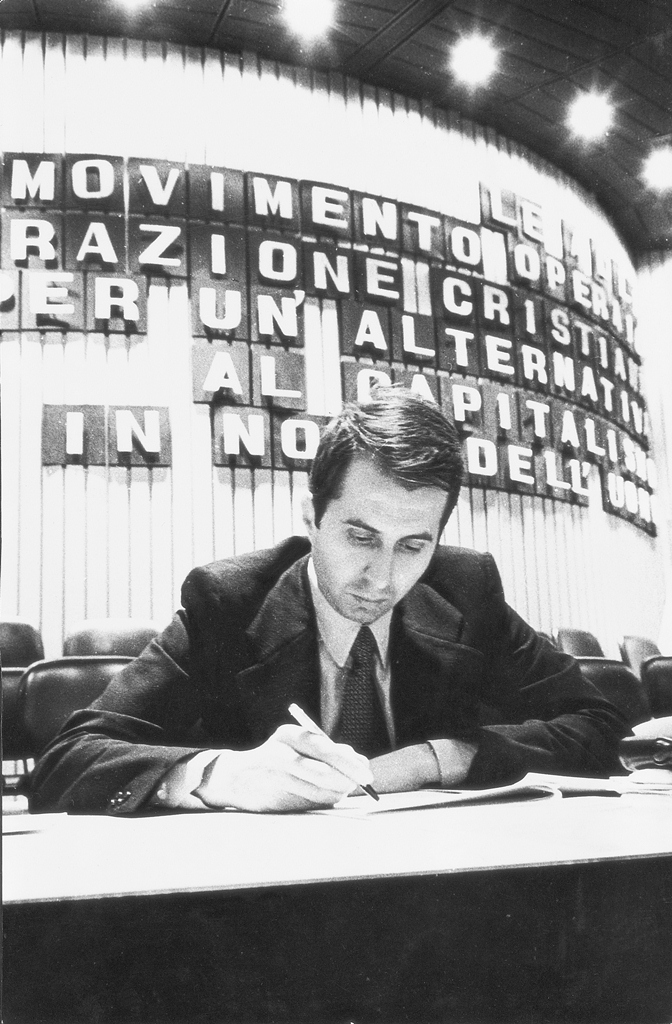
- Gabaglio in 1970
- Born: 1 July 1937; Como, Italy
- Died: 7 October 2024 (aged 87)

Emilio Gabaglio (1 July 1937 – 7 October 2024) was an Italian trade union leader.

== Life and career ==
Born in Como, Gabaglio studied economics at the University of Milan. He became a secondary school teacher, and in 1964 he joined a union which was affiliated with the Italian Confederation of Workers' Trade Unions (CISL). He was active in the Christian Associations of Italian Workers (ACLI), and was elected as its national president in 1969. His mandate was perhaps the most tormented, because it began shortly after the break with the Catholic hierarchy: with a letter dated 6 March 1970, Cardinal Antonio Poma, president of the Italian Episcopal Conference, asked for an account of the choices made by the Labor presidency and confirmed by Gabaglio, who convened, claiming the autonomy of the movement, a conference which was held in Vallombrosa from 27 to 30 August 1970, under the title of “Workers' Movement, Capitalism, Democracy”, during which what was called “the socialist hypothesis" of the ACLI was launched. He moved the organisation to the left, encouraging it to adopt Christian socialist positions. This led a right-wing minority to split away as the Workers' Christian Movement, and in 1971, Pope Paul VI publicly deplored the ACLI.

Gabaglio stood down from the ACLI in 1972, and found work as head of the international department of CISL. He represented it to the International Confederation of Free Trade Unions, the International Labour Organization, and the Trade Union Advisory Committee to the OECD. In 1983, he joined the national secretariat of CISL, becoming the federation's lead on regional and environmental policy and internal organisation, and then from 1989 on European policy.

In 1991, Gabaglio was elected as General Secretary of the European Trade Union Confederation, in which role he faced the decline of some of its members organisations, but facilitated the admission of new federations from Eastern Europe. He stood down in 2003, and became active in the Democratic Party. From 2006, he was the European Affairs Counselor for the Italian Minister of Labour, then in 2009 became president of the Democratic Party's Work Forum.

Gabaglio died on 7 October 2024, at the age of 87.

Non-profit organization positions
Preceded by Livio Labor	President of the Christian Associations of Italian Workers; 1969–1972	Succeeded by Marino Carboni
Trade union offices
Preceded by Mathias Hinterscheid	General Secretary of the European Trade Union Confederation; 1991–2003	Succeeded by John Monks
