= Antonio Gabaglio =

Italian statistician (1840–1909)

Gabaglio Antonio (30 June 1840, Pavia, Austrian Empire – 14 November 1909, Pavia, Italy) was an Italian statistician.

== Biography ==
Antonio graduated in law in 1862 at the University of Pavia.

In January 1878, he obtained a lectureship in statistics at the University of Pavia. When in Italy, the chairs of statistics were still scarce and often were associated with the teaching of political economy;he tried to provide statistics with the character of "science" and "method" and to introduce mathematics in order to support statistical computations. The first work on methodological statistics due to Gabaglio appeared in the winter of 1880, and it was La storia e teoria della statistica, published in Milan by Hoepli. The study consisted of an extensive and detailed methodological section. The volume was met with broad consensus in the scientific world, and in February 1880, the technical education division of the Ministry of Education appointed Gabaglio as Cavaliere dell'Ordine dei Ss. Maurizio e Lazzaro.

In 1888, he wrote an opera entitled Teoria generale della statistica, again published by Hoepli. Gabaglio made a strong effort for the affirmation of the mathematical method in a discipline traditionally taught in the Faculty of Law. In the late 1880s, he left the chair of statistics at the University of Pavia and returned to teach in the Technical Institute, from which he came. He died at Pavia on 14 November 1909.

== Academic positions ==
- Teacher of Statistics and economic studies at the Tech Institute of Pavia (1868–1872)
- Teacher of political economy, statistics, and scientific elements of civil ethics and law at the Industrial and Professional Institute of Pavia (1873)
- Full Professor of Statistics at the Faculty of Law at the University of Pavia (1878)

== Publications ==
- Storia e teoria generale della Statistica, Milano, Hoepli, 1880
- Teoria generale della Statistica, Milano, Ulrico Hoepli, 1888–89
