= Independent Luxembourg Trade Union Confederation =

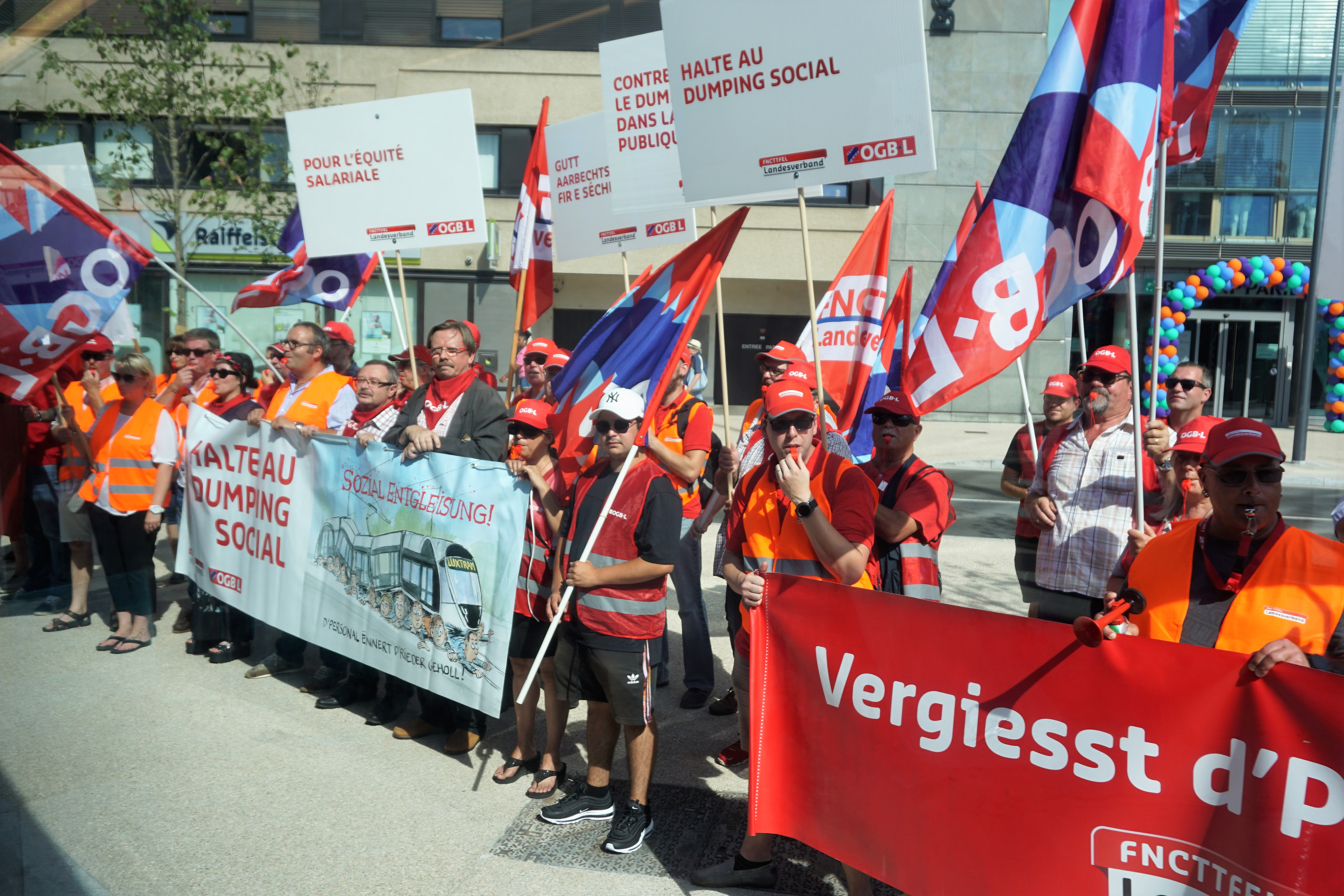
Workers represented by OGBL picketing for improved working conditions for Luxtram staff

The Independent Luxembourg Trade Union Confederation (Luxembourgish: Onofhängege Gewerkschaftsbond Lëtzebuerg, German: Unabhängiger Gewerkschaftsbund Luxemburg), also OGBL or OGB-L, is a Luxembourg general union.

== History ==
The union was established in 1979, when the Luxembourg Workers' Union merged with the General Federation of Teachers of Luxembourg. They hoped that the country's other unions would join the merger, but only the leadership of the Luxembourg Association of Banking and Insurance Employees, the Federation of Private Employees, and the Neutral Craftsmen Union did so. The new union affiliated to the General Confederation of Labour of Luxembourg and, given its size, it has since been the dominant force in the federation.

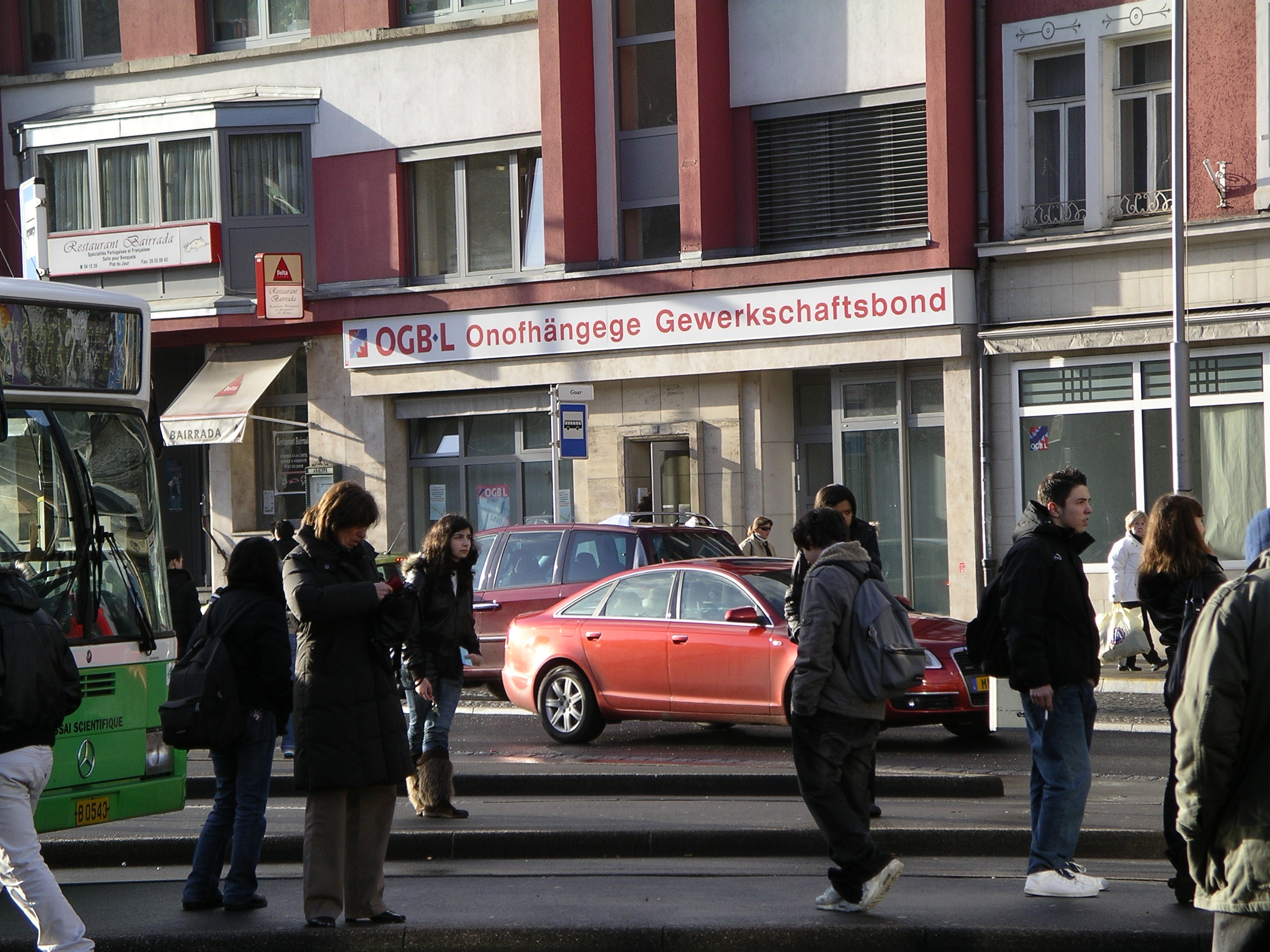
OBGL office in Esch-sur-Alzette

The union grew over time, absorbing the Association of Professional Drivers, and the Federation of Printing Workers of Luxembourg. It is open to all workers and pensioners, and is based in Esch-Alzette. It was divided into 15 professional trade unions, according to the different employee groups. In 2020, the National Federation of Railway Workers, Transport Workers, Civil Servants and Employees of Luxembourg agreed to join, as its sixteenth sectoral union.

The OGBL publishes the members' magazine Aktuell in multiple languages.

== Presidents ==
- 1979: John Castegnaro
- 2004: Jean-Claude Reding
- 2014: André Roeltgen
- 2019: Nora Back
