= Luxembourg Confederation of Christian Trade Unions =

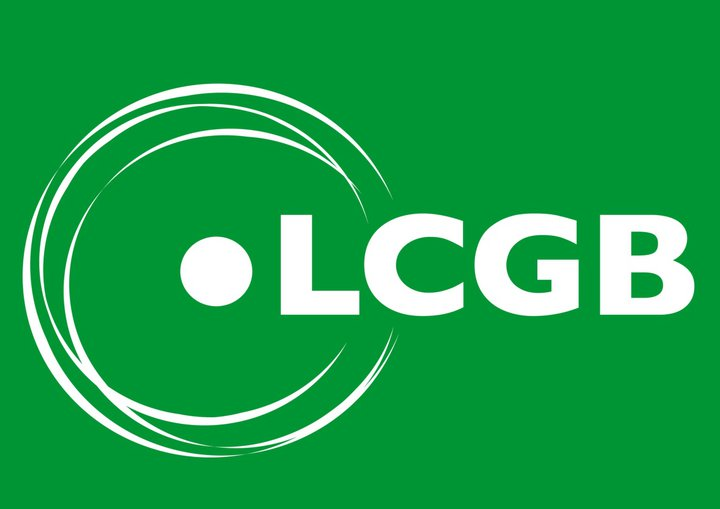
LCGB Logo

The Luxembourg Confederation of Christian Trade Unions (Luxembourgish: Lëtzebuerger Chrëschtleche Gewerkschaftsbond, French: Confédération luxembourgeoise des syndicats chrétiens), abbreviated to LCGB, is a Luxembourgish trade union. As the LCGB abides by the principles of Christian social teachings. This is also illustrated by the trade union's motto: Man at the Center of our action.

== History ==
The organisation was established in 1921 as a federation of trade unions. Its affiliates have since merged into the LCGB, making it a single trade union with various sectoral bodies.

=== Organisation ===
By membership, the LCGB is the second-largest trade union in the country, with a little over 40,000 members. The LCGB has its headquarters not far from the central train station in Luxembourg City.

On the international scale, the LCGB is affiliated to the International Trade Union Confederation (ITUC) and the European Trade Union Confederation (ETUC).

On the regional scale ("Grande Région"), the LCGB is a member of the IGR Saar-Lor-Lux/Trier-Westpfalz, the IRS 3 Frontières and the Plateforme syndicale de la Grande Région (PSGR). As such, two EURES-councillors are working at LCGB.

== Former affiliates ==
Union	Membership (1963)
Christian Federation of Craftsmen	1,583
Christian Federation of Pensioners	1,543
Federation of Christian Construction and Quarry Workers	1,262
Federation of Christian Factory and Leather Workers	3,930
Federation of Christian Metal Workers	6,040
Federation of Christian Miners	625
Federation of Christian Officials and Employees	1,286
Federation of Christian Public Service Workers	1,278

== Presidents ==
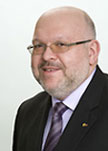
Patrick Dury, National President of LCGB

- Patrick Dury (2011-)
- Robert Weber (1996–2011)
- Marcel Glesener (1980–1996)
- Jean Spautz (1967–1980)
- Pierre Schockmel (1967)
- Léon Wagner (1951–1966)
- Jean-Baptiste Rock (1938–1951)
- Mathias Dossing (1924–1938)
- Michel Wolff (1921–1924)
