= Luxembourg Workers' Union =

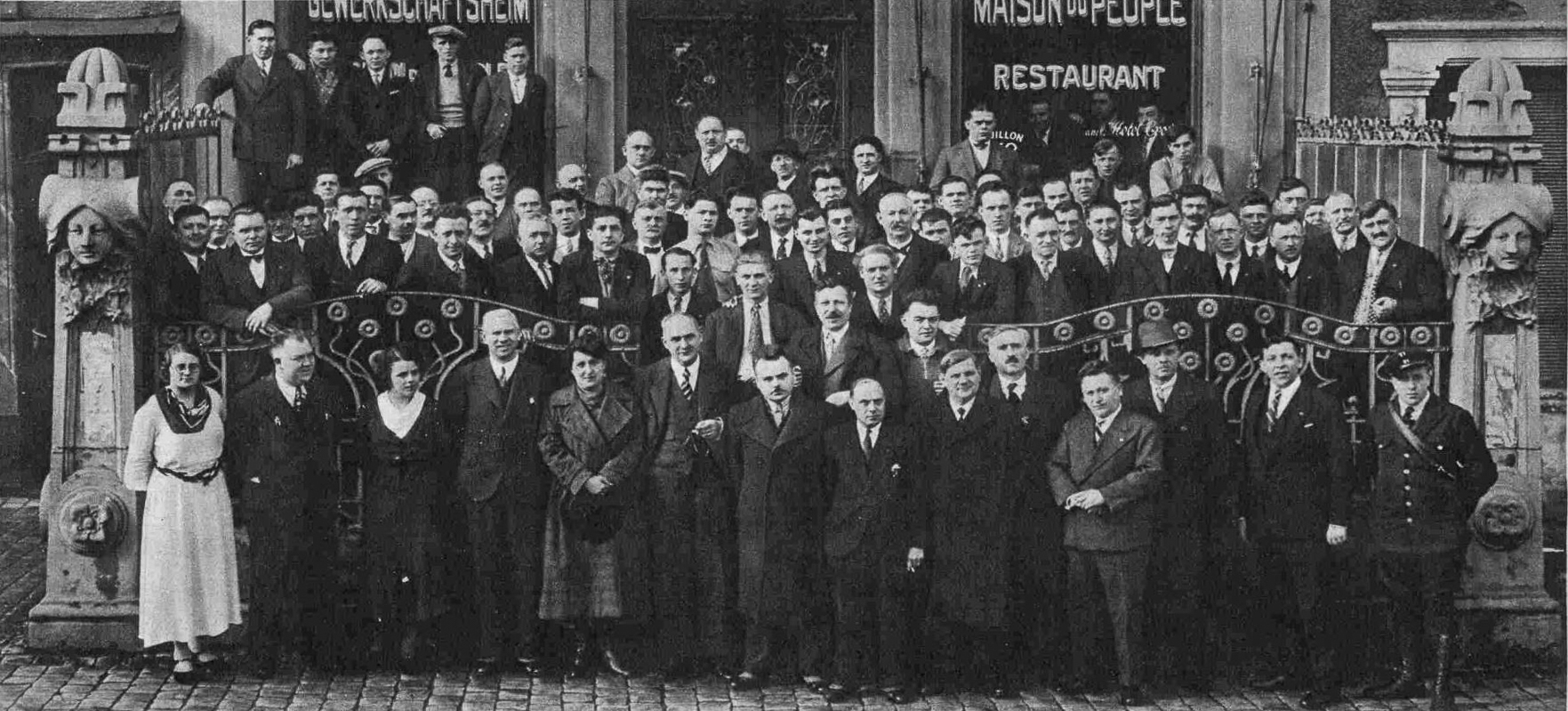
10th Congress of the Luxembourg Miners and Metalworkers’ Union

The Luxembourg Workers' Union (Luxembourgish: Lëtzebuerger Arbechter-Verband, LAV) was a general union in Luxembourg.

The union was founded in 1920, as the Luxembourg Mining and Metalworkers' Union. This was a merger of the Luxembourg Miners' and Ironworkers' Union with the Luxembourg Metalworkers' Union, both of which had been established in 1916. In 1921, many Catholic trade unionists left the new union, to form a new union affiliated to the Luxembourg Confederation of Christian Trade Unions (LCGB).

The union led a major strike in March 1921, against redundancies, but this was unsuccessful, and also led to the temporary banning of factory councils. From 1924, it participated in the statutory Chamber of Labour. In 1936, it worked with the LCGB to organise a major strike in support of improved pay and collective bargaining.

In 1944, the union became the LAV. The following year, the union's left wing split away, to form the Free Luxembourger Workers' Union. This dissolved in 1966, and many of its members then rejoined the LAV. In 1977, it merged with the General Federation of Teachers, to form the Independent Luxembourg Trade Union Confederation.

== Presidents ==
- 1938: Nicolas Biever
- Antoine Krier
- 1965: Benny Berg
- 1970: Mathias Hinterscheid
- 1976: Antoine Weiss
