= Luxembourgish Footballer of the Year =

Luxembourgish association football award

The Luxembourgish Footballer of the Year is an award granted every season to a football player from Luxembourg's domestic top-flight National Division, rewarding the player judged to have been the most valuable to his team that season. It is awarded by the sports desk of Luxemburger Wort, Luxembourg's most-read daily newspaper. It has been awarded every year since 1988, and has been named the Guy Greffrath Challenge after Guy Greffrath, the long-time sports editor at Luxemburger Wort, since 1997.

== Winners ==
| Season | Winner | Club |
|---|---|---|
| 1987–88 | (Luxembourg) Denis Scuto | Jeunesse Esch |
| 1988–89 | (France) Jean-Marc Rigaud | CA Spora Luxembourg |
| 1989–90 | (Luxembourg) Carlo Weis | FC Avenir Beggen |
| 1990–91 | (Luxembourg) Marc Birsens | Union Luxembourg |
| 1991–92 | (Luxembourg) Claude Ganser | Jeunesse Esch |
| 1992–93 | (Luxembourg) Luc Holtz | FC Etzella Ettelbruck |
| 1993–94 | (Luxembourg) Théo Scholten | FC Avenir Beggen |
| 1994–95 | (Luxembourg) Manuel Cardoni | Jeunesse Esch |
| 1995–96 | (Luxembourg) Manuel Cardoni | Jeunesse Esch |
| 1996–97 | (Luxembourg) Mikhail Zaritskiy | FC Sporting Mertzig |
| 1997–98 | (Luxembourg) Mikhail Zaritskiy | FC Sporting Mertzig |
| 1998–99 | (Luxembourg) Manuel Cardoni | Jeunesse Esch |
| 1999–00 | (Luxembourg) Manuel Cardoni | Jeunesse Esch |
| 2000–01 | (Morocco) Ahmed El Aouad | CS Hobscheid |
| 2001–02 | (France) Frédéric Cicchirillo | F91 Dudelange |
| 2002–03 | (Morocco) Ahmed El Aouad | CS Grevenmacher |
| 2003–04 | (France) Laurent Pellegrino | Jeunesse Esch |
| 2004–05 | (France) Stéphane Martine | F91 Dudelange |
| 2005–06 | (France) Joris Di Gregorio | F91 Dudelange |
| 2006–07 | (France) Joris Di Gregorio | F91 Dudelange |
| 2007–08 | (France) Emmanuel Coquelet | F91 Dudelange |
| 2008–09 | (France) Pierre Piskor | FC Differdange 03 |
| 2009–10 | (Luxembourg) Daniel Huss | CS Grevenmacher |
| 2010–11 | (Luxembourg) Daniel da Mota | F91 Dudelange |
| 2011–12 | (Luxembourg) Aurélien Joachim | F91 Dudelange |
| 2012–13 | (Luxembourg) Stefano Bensi | CS Fola Esch |
| 2013–14 | (Bosnia and Herzegovina) Sanel Ibrahimović | Jeunesse Esch |
| 2014–15 | (Luxembourg) Laurent Jans | CS Fola Esch |
| 2015–16 | (Luxembourg) David Turpel | F91 Dudelange |
| 2016–17 | (France) Omar Er Rafik | Differdange 03 / F91 Dudelange |
| 2017–18 | (Luxembourg) David Turpel | F91 Dudelange |
| 2018–19 | (Luxembourg) Danel Sinani | F91 Dudelange |
