= 2009–10 Luxembourg National Division =

BGL Ligue
- Season: 2009–10
- Champions: Jeunesse Esch; 29th title
- Relegated: US Rumelange; Mondercange
- Champions League: Jeunesse Esch
- Europa League: F91 Dudelange; CS Grevenmacher; FC Differdange 03 (via domestic cup)
- Matches: 182
- Goals: 555 (3.05 per match)
- Biggest home win: FC Differdange 03 7-0 Racing FC
- Biggest away win: Mondercange 0-9 F91 Dudelange
- Highest scoring: Fola Esch 5-4 Etzella Ettelbruck; Mondercange 0-9 F91 Dudelange; RM Hamm Benfica 7-2 Pétange

The 2009–10 Luxembourg National Division (also known as BGL Ligue due to sponsorship reasons) was the 96th season of top-tier football in Luxembourg. It began on 2 August 2009 and ended on 29 May 2010. F91 Dudelange were the defending champions.

== Team changes from 2008–09 ==
SC Steinfort and FC Avenir Beggen were relegated to the Division of Honour after finishing 13th and 14th in 2008–09. They were replaced by Division of Honour 2008–09 champions CS Pétange and runners-up FC Mondercange.

US Rumelange as 12th-placed team had to compete in a single play-off match against 3rd-placed Division of Honour side FC Erpeldange 72. Rumelange won the match, 2–0, and thus retained their National Division status.

== Stadia and locations ==
Location of teams in National Division 2009–10

Team	Venue	Capacity
FC Differdange 03	Stade du Thillenberg	7,830
F91 Dudelange	Stade Jos Nosbaum	2,600
FC Etzella Ettelbruck	Stade Am Deich	2,650
CS Fola Esch	Stade Émile Mayrisch	3,900
CS Grevenmacher	Op Flohr Stadion	4,000
Jeunesse Esch	Stade de la Frontière	5,400
UN Käerjeng 97	Stade um Bëschel	1,000
FC Mondercange	Stade Communal	2,050
CS Pétange	Stade Municipal (Pétange)	3,300
FC Progrès Niederkorn	Stade Jos Haupert	4,830
Racing FC Union Luxembourg	Stade Achille Hammerel	5,814
FC RM Hamm Benfica	Luxembourg-Cents	2,800
US Rumelange	Stade Municipal (Rumelange)	2,950
FC Swift Hesperange	Stade Alphonse Theis	3,058

== League table ==
Pos	Team	Pld	W	D	L	GF	GA	GD	Pts	Qualification or relegation
1	Jeunesse Esch (C)	26	17	6	3	45	20	+25	57	Qualification to Champions League second qualifying round
2	F91 Dudelange	26	16	6	4	62	23	+39	54	Qualification to Europa League first qualifying round
3	Grevenmacher	26	13	4	9	46	40	+6	43	Qualification to Europa League first qualifying round
4	Differdange 03	26	12	6	8	41	30	+11	42	Qualification to Europa League second qualifying round (Note: The winners of 2009–10 Luxembourg Cup, Differdange, qualified for the second qualifying round of UEFA Europa League.)
5	RM Hamm Benfica	26	11	8	7	50	29	+21	41	
6	Fola Esch	26	11	8	7	49	38	+11	41	
7	Racing FC	26	12	5	9	39	47	−8	41	
8	Etzella Ettelbruck	26	8	8	10	42	43	−1	32	
9	Pétange	26	9	5	12	36	42	−6	32	
10	Swift Hesperange	26	8	5	13	33	41	−8	29	
11	Progrès Niederkorn	26	6	10	10	39	44	−5	28	
12	UN Käerjeng 97 (O)	26	7	7	12	28	36	−8	28	Qualification to Relegation play-offs
13	Rumelange (R)	26	7	1	18	27	63	−36	22	Relegation to Luxembourg Division of Honour
14	Mondercange (R)	26	2	7	17	18	58	−40	13	Relegation to Luxembourg Division of Honour

Source: soccerway.com
Rules for classification: 1) points; 2) goal difference; 3) number of goals scored.
(C) Champions; (O) Play-off winners; (R) Relegated

== Results ==
Home \ Away	DIF	DUD	ETZ	FOL	GRE	JEU	KÄE	MON	PET	PRO	RAC	RMH	RUM	SWI
Differdange 03		0–1	2–0	0–5	2–0	5–2	2–1	1–0	4–1	1–1	7–0	1–0	4–0	1–1
F91 Dudelange	3–1		1–1	3–3	5–0	4–0	1–1	1–0	2–0	2–1	3–0 (Note: The match was awarded to Dudelange with a score of 3–0 after it wasn't resumed after the half time due to the fight that escalated between two players.)	3–0	0–0	4–1
Etzella Ettelbruck	1–0	1–2		0–1	1–3	1–1	1–1	0–0	2–4	2–2	6–1	1–1	1–2	1–0
Fola Esch	1–1	1–3	5–4		3–2	0–1	0–0	1–1	2–1	4–1	1–2	1–1	4–2	4–1
Grevenmacher	2–0	1–0	3–1	2–0		2–5	5–2	0–1	0–3	2–1	1–1	3–2	4–1	2–1
Jeunesse Esch	2–1	1–1	1–2	1–0	2–0		2–0	2–0	0–0	2–1	5–1	1–0	4–0	3–1
UN Käerjeng 97	1–4	1–0	0–1	1–0	1–1	0–0		1–1	0–0	2–0	1–3	0–1	1–2	0–2
Mondercange	1–1	0–9	2–1	2–2	1–5	1–1	0–4		0–1	1–1	1–2	1–5	0–2	0–2
Pétange	0–0	0–1	1–1	1–3	2–0	0–3	3–1	5–2		1–1	4–1	0–1	1–3	1–3
Progrès Niederkorn	0–0	4–2	1–3	1–1	0–0	0–2	0–2	4–2	0–1		2–2	2–2	3–1	1–4
Racing FC	0–1	2–2	3–4	2–2	2–1	0–2	1–0	1–0	3–1	1–2		1–0	3–0	1–0
RM Hamm Benfica	3–0	4–2	3–1	3–0	2–2	0–1	3–0	2–0	7–2	3–3	1–1		0–3	0–0
Rumelange	1–2	0–5	1–3	2–4	0–2	0–1	2–3	2–0	1–0	0–3	0–3	0–6		1–2
Swift Hesperange	3–0	0–2	2–2	0–1	1–3	0–0	1–4	2–1	1–3	1–4	0–2	0–0	4–1	

Source: soccerway.com
Legend: Blue = home team win; Yellow = draw; Red = away team win.

== Relegation play-offs ==
12th-placed UN Käerjeng 97 competed in a relegation play-offs match against the third-placed team from the Division of Honour, CS Oberkorn, for one spot in next season's competition. UN Käerjeng 97 retained their spot in the league, beating CS Obercorn 3–1.

28 May 2010
19:30 CEST

UN Käerjeng 97	3–1	CS Oberkorn

Stade Communal, Mondercange

== Top goalscorers ==
Rank	Player	Club	Goals
1	(Luxembourg) Daniel Huss	CS Grevenmacher	20
2	(France) Joris Di Gregorio	Fola Esch	16
3	(Bosnia and Herzegovina) Anel Pjanić	CS Pétange	12
3	(France) Nicolas Caldieri	Progrès Niederkorn	12
3	(France) Romain Zewe	UN Käerjéng 97	12
6	(Portugal) Johan Sampaio	Swift Hesperange	11
7	(France) Djilali Kehal	RM Hamm Benfica	10
8	(France) Aoued Aouaichia	RM Hamm Benfica	9
8	(Luxembourg) Daniel da Mota	F91 Dudelange	9
10	(Luxembourg) Aurélien Joachim	FC Differdange 03	8
10	(Belgium) Stéphane Piron	Jeunesse Esch	8
10	(France) Stéphane Martine	Racing FC	8
10	(France) Pierre Piskor	FC Differdange 03	8

== See also ==
- 2009–10 Luxembourg Cup
