= Michel Le Flochmoan =

French footballer and manager (1951–2021)

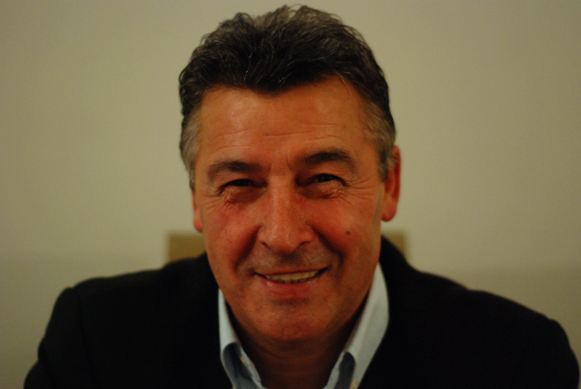
- Le Flochmoan in 2007

Personal information
- Full name: Michel André Yves Le Flochmoan
- Date of birth: 6 October 1951
- Place of birth: Blagny, France
- Date of death: 10 August 2021 (aged 69)
- Place of death: Charleville-Mézières, France
- Position: Forward

Youth career
- 1965–1973: ES Pure-Messempré

Senior career*
Years	Team	Apps	(Gls)
1973–1974	Mouzon		
1974–1976	Maubeuge		
1976–1984	Entente Carignan-Linay		

Managerial career
- 1983–1984: Entente Carignan-Linay
- 1984–1987: Sedan B
- 1987–1994: Sedan
- 1995: Arlon
- 1996–2003: Virton
- 2003–2004: Jeunesse Esch
- 2004–2009: Dudelange
- 2009–2010: Arlon
- 2012–2014: Differdange
- 2015–2016: Dudelange
- * Club domestic league appearances and goals

Michel André Yves Le Flochmoan (6 October 1951 – 10 August 2021) was a French professional football player and manager. After an amateur career as a forward with Mouzon, Maubeuge, and Entente Carignan-Linay, he became a manager.

He notably coached Sedan and Virton, as well as Jeunesse Esch, which he coached to a championship in 2004. He then coached Dudelange to championships in 2005, 2006, 2007, 2008, and 2009. He was coach of Differdange from 2012 to 2014, which won the Luxembourg Cup in 2014. He returned to Dudelange in 2015 and won the Luxembourg Cup in 2016.

== Playing career ==
Le Flochmoan did not start playing football until the age of 15, when he began playing youth football with ES Pure-Messempré. He had previously been prohibited from playing the sport for medical reasons. In 1973, he joined Mouzon as a forward in the Division 3. He left the club following its merger with Sedan and joined US Maubeuge, where he stayed for two years. In 1976, he joined Entente Carignan-Linay, another amateur club where he played as a forward, midfielder, and defender. With the club, he won the Coupe des Ardennes in 1979. In 1980, the club was promoted to Division 4 following a victorious shootout against US Blagny. After playing four seasons in the Division 4, he retired from his career as a player in 1984.

== Managerial career ==
During his final season at Entente Carignan-Linay, Le Flochmoan held the role of player-manager. That season, the club finished with a record of seven wins, seven draws, and twelve defeats.

In 1984, Le Flochmoan became manager of Sedan's B team, which won the Coupe des Ardennes in 1987. The following year, he took over the first team and coached within Division 3, which was not a professional league. In 1991, the club won the Division 3 against Auxerre in a penalty shoot-out . However, the promotion to Division 2 was difficult for the club. It narrowly escaped relegation in 1992 following a victory against Angers on the final day of the season. They finished 6th in 1993 and 14th in 1994. He was fired shortly into the next season and replaced by Christian Sarramagna, although he had just signed a three-year contract. Additionally, he had just been named sporting director of Sedan.

After four months with no activity, Le Flochmoan was hired to be manager of the Belgian club Arlon. The club finished second in their group and qualified for the promotional tournament. They won against RCS Braine in the first round, but were defeated by Tienen-Hageland in the second round and were not promoted. He did not re-sign with the club.

In 1996, Le Flochmoan was signed by Virton to coach the Belgian Third Division team. The team won the division in 2001 after finishing as runners-up the previous year. Virton was promoted to the Belgian Second Division for the 2002 season, and it subsequently qualified for the 2002–03 Belgian Cup, where it was defeated by Genk in the first round.

In June 2003, he joined the Luxembourg National Division in his new coaching job with Jeunesse Esch. In his first season with the club, they won the division championship. The following year, he joined Dudelange. He led the team to qualify for second qualifying round of the UEFA Champions League in the 2005–06 season, a feat never before achieved by a football club in the country. The club was eliminated by Rapid Wien. Dudelange won the National Division Championship every year from 2005 to 2009. He left the club following the 2009 season.

Le Flochmoan engaged in contract negotiations with Metz, but he ultimately signed with Arlon again in June 2009. However, he resigned in January 2010 citing sporting and financial problems. In August 2010, he was nearly selected to succeed Guy Hellers as coach of the Luxembourg national team, but he did not ultimately get the job. In November 2011, talks fell through with Pétange.

On 4 June 2012, Le Flochmoan returned to the Luxembourg National Division, signing a contract with Differdange for two years. The team finished fourth in 2013 and qualified for the 2013–14 UEFA Europa League. The team reached the third round before it was defeated by Tromsø on penalty shots. It was then a finalist for the Luxembourg Cup, losing to Le Flochmoan's former club Jeunesse Esch. The team won the 2014 Luxembourg Cup against Dudelange, and he subsequently stepped down as coach. However, he returned to Dudelange in June 2015 and won the 2016 Luxembourg Cup. He was not retained by the club and replaced by Dino Toppmöller.

== Death ==
Le Flochmoan died on 10 August 2021, at the age of 69.

== Honours ==
=== Player ===
Entente Carignan-Linay

- Coupe des Ardennes: 1978–79

=== Manager ===
Sedan B

- Coupe des Ardennes: 1986–87

Sedan

- Division 3: 1990–91

Virton

- Belgian Third Division B: 2000–01

Jeunesse Esch

- Luxembourg National Division: 2003–04

Dudelange

- Luxembourg National Division: 2004–05, 2005–06, 2006–07, 2007–08, 2008–09
- Luxembourg Cup: 2015–16

Differdange

- Luxembourg Cup: 2013–14

Individual

- Coach of the Decade of the Province of Luxembourg: 2000–2010
