= 2007–08 Luxembourg National Division =

Luxembourg National Division
- Season: 2007–08
- Champions: F91 Dudelange (7th titles)
- Relegated: Pétange; Victoria Rosport; Wiltz 71
- Champions League: F91 Dudelange
- UEFA Cup: Racing FC (via cup); Grevenmacher
- Intertoto Cup: Etzella Ettelbruck
- Top goalscorer: Emmanuel Coquelet (20 goals)

The 2007–08 Luxembourg National Division was the 94th season of top level association football in Luxembourg. The competition ran from August 2007 to 31 May 2008. F91 Dudelange won their fourth consecutive title.

== Teams ==
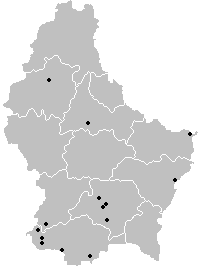
Locations of participating teams across Luxembourg

Club	Town	2006–07 Season
FC Avenir Beggen	Beggen	Division of Honour, 2nd
FC Differdange 03	Differdange	3rd
F91 Dudelange	Dudelange	1st
FC Etzella Ettelbruck	Ettelbruck	2nd
CS Grevenmacher	Grevenmacher	6th
Jeunesse Esch	Esch-sur-Alzette	9th
UN Käerjéng 97	Bascharage	8th
CS Pétange	Pétange	10th
FC Progrès Niedercorn	Niederkorn	7th
Racing FC Union Luxembourg	Luxembourg City	4th
FC RM Hamm Benfica	Luxembourg City	Division of Honour, 1st
FC Swift Hesperange	Hesperange	5th
FC Victoria Rosport	Rosport	12th
FC Wiltz 71	Wiltz	11th

== Format ==
As in 2006–07, the 2007–08 season involved a round-robin among the fourteen teams. Thus, each team played 26 games over the course of the calendar.

The bottom two teams were relegated automatically; these teams were CS Pétange and FC Victoria Rosport. The third-bottom (twelfth-placed) team was required to take part in a play-off with the third-placed team from the Division of Honour for the place in the National Division the following season. In the event, FC Wiltz 71 finished third-bottom, and lost the play-off to Sporting Steinfort.

== European qualification ==
Luxembourg was assigned one spot in the first qualifying round of the UEFA Champions League, for the league champions, F91 Dudelange. It has also been assigned two spots in the first qualifying round of the UEFA Cup, for the runners-up, Racing FC Union Luxembourg, and the Luxembourg Cup winners. If, as happened two seasons previously, the league champions and runners-up had both reach the cup final, the second UEFA Cup spot would have gone to the team placed third in the league. However, in the event, neither of the top two clubs reached the semi-finals, and the cup-winners spot went to CS Grevenmacher. Jeunesse Esch have not applied to play in the 2008 UEFA Intertoto Cup, so Etzella Ettelbruck have qualified in Jeunesse's place.

== Final standings ==
Pos	Team	Pld	W	D	L	GF	GA	GD	Pts	Qualification or relegation
1	F91 Dudelange (C)	26	23	2	1	74	12	+62	71	Qualification to Champions League first qualifying round
2	Racing FC	26	14	8	4	50	28	+22	50	Qualification to UEFA Cup first qualifying round
3	Jeunesse Esch	26	13	6	7	51	39	+12	45	
4	Etzella Ettelbruck	26	13	5	8	54	48	+6	44	Qualification to Intertoto Cup first round
5	Avenir Beggen	26	11	4	11	41	38	+3	37	
6	Grevenmacher	26	10	6	10	45	36	+9	36	Qualification to UEFA Cup first qualifying round
7	Differdange 03	26	11	2	13	43	43	0	35	
8	RM Hamm Benfica	26	9	5	12	32	48	−16	32	
9	Swift Hesperange	26	8	7	11	36	44	−8	31	
10	UN Käerjéng 97	26	8	6	12	30	40	−10	30	
11	Progrès Niederkorn	26	7	7	12	31	46	−15	28	
12	Wiltz 71 (R)	26	6	7	13	33	48	−15	25	Qualification to Relegation play-offs
13	Victoria Rosport (R)	26	6	6	14	29	56	−27	24	Relegation to Luxembourg Division of Honour
14	Pétange (R)	26	4	7	15	27	50	−23	19	Relegation to Luxembourg Division of Honour

(C) Champions; (R) Relegated

== Results ==
Home \ Away	BEG	DIF	DUD	ETZ	GRE	JEU	KAE	PÉT	PRO	RAC	RMH	SWI	VIC	WIL
Avenir Beggen		1–0	1–0	0–2	1–2	1–2	2–1	1–1	1–2	0–0	3–1	1–3	4–1	1–2
Differdange 03	2–3		2–4	3–1	0–3	3–0	5–0	2–1	1–2	3–1	2–3	2–1	2–1	4–1
F91 Dudelange	1–0	2–0		7–1	1–0	6–2	1–0	1–0	4–1	1–1	3–0	2–0	3–0	1–0
Etzella Ettelbruck	2–2	2–0	1–3		1–5	5–4	0–3	3–1	4–2	2–2	3–0	2–1	1–2	3–1
Grevenmacher	2–0	3–2	0–2	0–1		4–2	1–0	3–1	2–2	1–1	0–0	1–2	6–0	2–2
Jeunesse Esch	3–0	2–0	1–1	2–2	2–1		2–3	4–1	0–0	2–0	1–1	4–1	2–0	4–1
UN Käerjéng 97	3–3	2–2	0–4	0–0	2–1	0–1		3–0	1–1	0–1	1–2	1–5	1–1	2–1
Pétange	1–2	0–1	0–4	1–1	2–1	2–2	0–0		1–2	2–2	1–2	1–3	3–2	3–2
Progrès Niederkorn	2–1	1–0	1–5	0–3	1–3	3–2	1–3	0–0		0–1	3–0	2–2	0–0	2–2
Racing FC	1–4	0–0	0–2	3–2	4–2	3–0	2–0	4–0	3–1		3–0	1–1	4–1	3–1
RM Hamm Benfica	1–3	2–3	1–5	2–1	2–0	0–1	2–0	0–2	3–1	0–3		3–1	2–2	1–1
Swift Hesperange	2–1	1–2	0–2	1–5	1–1	1–1	0–2	2–2	1–0	1–4	2–0		0–0	1–1
Victoria Rosport	1–3	3–2	0–7	2–3	3–0	0–1	2–1	2–1	2–1	1–1	0–1	1–2		2–2
Wiltz 71	0–2	3–0	0–2	1–3	1–1	0–4	0–1	1–0	1–0	1–2	3–3	2–1	3–0	

Legend: Blue = home team win; Yellow = draw; Red = away team win.

== Relegation play-off ==
31 May 2008

FC Wiltz 71	0–2	Sporting Steinfort

Stade Achille Hammerel, Luxembourg City

As a result of their victory, Sporting Steinfort were promoted to the National Division for the 2008–09 season, and FC Wiltz 71 relegated to the Division of Honour.

== Top goalscorers ==
Rank	Player	Club	Goals
1	(France) Emmanuel Coquelet	F91 Dudelange	20
2	(France) Aoued Aouaïchia	RM Hamm Benfica	18
2	(Luxembourg) Daniel da Mota	Etzella Ettelbruck	18
4	(Luxembourg) Daniel Huss	CS Grevenmacher	16
5	(France) Didier Chaillou	Progrès Niedercorn	15
6	(Cape Verde) Aderito Medina	Avenir Beggen	14
7	(France) Sergio Pupovac	Racing FC	12
7	(Poland) Tomas Gruszczynski	F91 Dudelange	12
9	(France) Stephane Martine	Racing FC	11
10	(France) Loïc Cantonnet	Jeunesse Esch	10
10	(Guinea) Soriba Camara	Racing FC	10
10	(France) Pierre Piskor	FC Differdange 03	10
