= 2003–04 Luxembourg National Division =

Luxembourg National Division
- Season: 2003–04
- Champions: Jeunesse Esch (27th title)
- Relegated: Mondercange; Rumelange
- Champions League: Jeunesse Esch
- UEFA Cup: F91 Dudelange; Etzella Ettelbruck
- Intertoto Cup: Grevenmacher
- Top goalscorer: José Andrade (24 goals)

The 2003–04 Luxembourg National Division was the 90th season of top level association football in Luxembourg. The competition ran from 9 August 2003 to 16 May 2004 with Jeunesse Esch winning the title.

== Teams ==
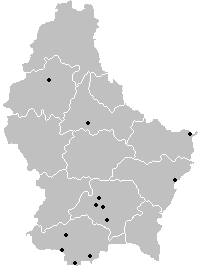
Locations of participating teams across Luxembourg

The 2003–04 season saw the National Division's roster of twelve clubs include:

- FC Avenir Beggen
- F91 Dudelange
- FC Etzella Ettelbruck (promoted from the Division of Honour)
- CS Grevenmacher
- Jeunesse Esch (the reigning champions)
- FC Mondercange
- US Rumelange
- CA Spora Luxembourg (promoted from the Division of Honour)
- FC Swift Hesperange
- Union Luxembourg
- FC Victoria Rosport
- FC Wiltz 71

== Format ==
The twelve teams completed the round-robin by playing each other twice (once home and once away) by 4 April. Then, the league divided into three. The top four teams were separated from the rest and formed the 'Title group' . The bottom eight teams were then subdivided into two groups of four, titled 'Relegation group A' and 'Relegation group B' . In the event, the top four were Jeunesse Esch, F91 Dudelange, FC Etzella Ettelbruck, and CS Grevenmacher.

In each of the three mini-leagues, each team played each of the three other teams in the mini-league twice (once home and once away). To these results were added the 22 results of the first stage. The overall points totals (and goal difference, etc.) were used to determine each club's position in its respective mini-league.

After calculating the final results after 28 games, Jeunesse Esch, the top team in the title group, was declared the league champion. The fourth-placed team in each of the relegation groups (FC Mondercange and US Rumelange in groups A and B respectively) was relegated to the Division of Honour.

This format is no longer used; the current season, 2006–07 uses a straightforward round-robin.

== European qualification ==
Luxembourg was assigned one spot in the first qualifying round of the UEFA Champions League, for the league champions; it was also assigned two spots in the first qualifying round of the UEFA Cup, for the runners-up and the winners of the Luxembourg Cup. As league champions, Jeunesse Esch qualified for the Champions League. F91 Dudelange qualified for the UEFA Cup as runners-up. In addition, as F91 Dudelange won the Luxembourg Cup and the other finalist (CS Pétange) was not a National Division team, the UEFA Cup spot assigned to the cup winners went to FC Etzella Ettelbruck, who finished third in the league.

== First phase ==
=== Table ===
Pos	Team	Pld	W	D	L	GF	GA	GD	Pts	Qualification
1	Jeunesse Esch	22	19	1	2	56	13	+43	58	Qualification to championship stage
2	F91 Dudelange	22	14	4	4	52	19	+33	46	Qualification to championship stage
3	Etzella Ettelbruck	22	12	8	2	56	29	+27	44	Qualification to championship stage
4	Grevenmacher	22	11	3	8	47	33	+14	36	Qualification to championship stage
5	Spora Luxembourg	22	12	0	10	49	48	+1	36	Qualification to relegation stage
6	Union Luxembourg	22	9	5	8	31	21	+10	32	Qualification to relegation stage
7	Swift Hesperange	22	8	1	13	28	41	−13	25	Qualification to relegation stage
8	Victoria Rosport	22	7	3	12	32	38	−6	24	Qualification to relegation stage
9	Avenir Beggen	22	5	5	12	20	46	−26	20	Qualification to relegation stage
10	Rumelange	22	4	6	12	28	55	−27	18	Qualification to relegation stage
11	Mondercange	22	5	3	14	24	52	−28	18	Qualification to relegation stage
12	Wiltz 71	22	5	3	14	20	48	−28	18	Qualification to relegation stage

=== Results ===
Home \ Away	AVE	DUD	ETZ	GRE	JEU	MON	RUM	SPO	SWI	UNI	VIC	WIL
Avenir Beggen		3–2	0–3	1–0	0–1	2–0	2–2	1–2	0–2	0–1	1–1	0–2
F91 Dudelange	8–1		1–1	1–2	1–2	2–0	5–0	2–0	4–0	1–0	2–0	3–0
Etzella Ettelbruck	1–1	1–1		2–2	3–0	8–2	3–0	3–6	3–1	0–0	1–0	6–2
Grevenmacher	1–1	2–1	2–2		0–2	5–0	1–0	8–1	4–0	4–2	1–4	3–1
Jeunesse Esch	8–0	1–1	1–3	3–0		1–0	2–1	5–0	3–0	1–0	3–1	3–0
Mondercange	0–1	0–4	1–4	2–1	0–4		2–2	1–3	1–3	2–0	2–3	3–0
Rumelange	1–0	0–1	3–3	0–4	1–4	2–2		1–5	3–1	1–1	3–0	3–2
Spora Luxembourg	3–1	2–3	4–3	3–1	0–2	4–1	2–0		1–2	2–1	2–1	1–2
Swift Hesperange	5–2	1–3	0–2	1–2	1–2	1–0	1–1	3–2		0–3	0–1	3–0
Union Luxembourg	0–1	1–1	0–1	3–0	0–4	0–0	4–1	3–1	2–0		4–0	4–0
Victoria Rosport	1–1	1–2	1–2	3–2	0–1	1–3	8–2	2–4	2–1	0–1		2–0
Wiltz 71	2–1	1–3	1–1	0–2	1–3	1–2	2–1	2–1	0–2	1–1	0–0	

Legend: Blue = home team win; Yellow = draw; Red = away team win.

== Second phase ==
=== Championship stage ===
==== Table ====
Pos	Team	Pld	W	D	L	GF	GA	GD	Pts	Qualification
1	Jeunesse Esch (C)	28	22	2	4	70	23	+47	68	Qualification to Champions League first qualifying round
2	F91 Dudelange	28	18	5	5	62	26	+36	59	Qualification to UEFA Cup first qualifying round
3	Etzella Ettelbruck	28	13	9	6	63	41	+22	48	Qualification to UEFA Cup first qualifying round
4	Grevenmacher	28	13	4	11	56	44	+12	43	Qualification to Intertoto Cup first round

(C) Champions

==== Results ====
Home \ Away	DUD	ETZ	GRE	JEU
F91 Dudelange		0–0	2–1	3–2
Etzella Ettelbruck	2–0		1–3	2–3
Grevenmacher	1–3	2–1		2–2
Jeunesse Esch	1–2	4–1	2–0	

Legend: Blue = home team win; Yellow = draw; Red = away team win.

=== Relegation stage ===
==== Group A ====
===== Table =====
Pos	Team	Pld	W	D	L	GF	GA	GD	Pts	Relegation
1	Spora Luxembourg	28	14	2	12	56	57	−1	44	
2	Swift Hesperange	28	10	2	16	34	47	−13	32	
3	Avenir Beggen	28	7	7	14	28	54	−26	28	
4	Mondercange (R)	28	7	6	15	32	58	−26	27	Relegation to Luxembourg Division of Honour

(R) Relegated

===== Results =====
Home \ Away	AVE	MON	SPO	SWI
Avenir Beggen		2–2	1–2	2–0
Mondercange	1–1		3–0	1–0
Spora Luxembourg	1–2	1–1		1–1
Swift Hesperange	2–0	2–0	1–2	

Legend: Blue = home team win; Yellow = draw; Red = away team win.

==== Group B ====
===== Table =====
Pos	Team	Pld	W	D	L	GF	GA	GD	Pts	Relegation
1	Union Luxembourg	28	11	6	11	44	31	+13	39	
2	Victoria Rosport	28	9	4	15	38	50	−12	31	
3	Wiltz 71	28	7	7	14	31	54	−23	28	
4	Rumelange (R)	28	6	8	14	37	66	−29	26	Relegation to Luxembourg Division of Honour

(R) Relegated

===== Results =====
Home \ Away	RUM	UNI	VIC	WIL
Rumelange		2–1	0–2	1–1
Union Luxembourg	4–1		3–0	1–1
Victoria Rosport	1–3	3–2		0–4
Wiltz 71	2–2	3–2	0–0	

Legend: Blue = home team win; Yellow = draw; Red = away team win.

== Top goalscorers ==
Rank	Player	Club	Goals
1	(Portugal) José Andrade	Spora Luxembourg	24
2	(Luxembourg) Patrick Grettnich	Etzella Ettelbruck	21
3	(Luxembourg) Daniel Huss	CS Grevenmacher	17
4	(France) Frédéric Cicchirillo	F91 Dudelange	16
5	(France) Philippe Dillmann	US Rumelange	15
6	(Luxembourg) Luc Mischo	Etzella Ettelbruck	14
7	(Poland) Tomasz Gruszczyński	CS Grevenmacher	13
7	(Cape Verde) Aldino Medina	Avenir Beggen	13
7	(Luxembourg) Sascha Schneider	Jeunesse Esch	13
7	(Morocco) Ahmed Zerrouki	CS Grevenmacher	13

== Team changes for 2004-05 season ==
The champions and runners-up of the Division of Honour, CS Alliance 01 and CS Pétange, were promoted automatically. FC Mondercange and US Rumelange were relegated.
