= 2005–06 Luxembourg National Division =

Luxembourg National Division
- Season: 2005–06
- Champions: F91 Dudelange (5th titles)
- Relegated: Avenir Beggen; Rumelange
- Champions League: F91 Dudelange
- UEFA Cup: Jeunesse Esch; Etzella Ettelbruck
- Intertoto Cup: Grevenmacher
- Top goalscorer: Fatih Sözen (23 goals)

The 2005–06 Luxembourg National Division was the 92nd season of top level association football in Luxembourg. The competition ran from 7 August 2005 to 28 May 2006. The league title was won by F91 Dudelange, who also won the Luxembourg Cup to complete the Double.

== Teams ==
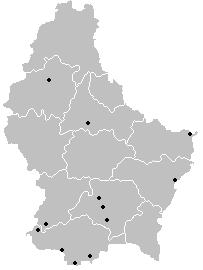
Locations of participating teams across Luxembourg

The 2005–06 season saw the National Division's roster of twelve clubs include:

- FC Avenir Beggen
- F91 Dudelange (the reigning champions)
- FC Etzella Ettelbruck
- CS Grevenmacher
- Jeunesse Esch
- UN Käerjeng 97 (promoted from the Division of Honour)
- CS Pétange
- Racing FC Union Luxembourg
- US Rumelange (promoted from the Division of Honour)
- FC Swift Hesperange
- FC Victoria Rosport
- FC Wiltz 71

== Format ==
The twelve teams completed the round-robin by playing each other twice (once home and once away) by 2 April. Then, the league divided into three. The top four teams were separated from the rest and formed the 'Title group' . The bottom eight teams were then subdivided into two groups of four, titled 'Relegation group A' and 'Relegation group B' . In the event, the top four were F91 Dudelange, Jeunesse Esch, FC Etzella Ettelbruck, and CS Grevenmacher.

In each of the three mini-leagues, each team played each of the three other teams in the mini-league twice (once home and once away). To these results were added the 22 results of the first stage. The overall points totals (and goal difference, etc.) were used to determine each club's position in its respective mini-league.

After calculating the final results after 28 games, F91 Dudelange, the top team in the title group, was declared the league champion. The fourth-placed team in each of the relegation groups (US Rumelange and FC Avenir Beggen in groups A and B respectively) played off against the third- and fourth-placed teams in Luxembourg's second division (FC Mondercange and FC Mamer 32), the Division of Honour. The winning team in each tie was awarded a place in the National Division in the 2006-07 season, whilst the losing team was confined to the second division. The matches were played on 28 May on neutral ground. Both National Division teams lost, thus were relegated.

2005-06 was the last season to use this format. From 2006 to 2007, a simple league round-robin will be used for the entire season.

== European qualification ==
Luxembourg was assigned one spot in the first qualifying round of the UEFA Champions League, for the league champions; it was also assigned two spots in the first qualifying round of the UEFA Cup, for the runners-up and the winners of the Luxembourg Cup. As league champions, F91 Dudelange qualified for the Champions League. Jeunesse Esch qualified for the UEFA Cup as runners-up. In addition, as F91 Dudelange and Jeunesse Esch contested the Luxembourg Cup final, the UEFA Cup assigned to the cup winners went to FC Etzella Ettelbruck, who finished third in the league.

== First phase ==
=== Table ===
| Pos | Team | Pld | W | D | L | GF | GA | GD | Pts | Qualification |
|---|---|---|---|---|---|---|---|---|---|---|
| 1 | F91 Dudelange | 22 | 16 | 3 | 3 | 63 | 15 | +48 | 51 | Qualification to championship stage |
| 2 | Jeunesse Esch | 22 | 14 | 2 | 6 | 49 | 19 | +30 | 44 | Qualification to championship stage |
| 3 | Etzella Ettelbruck | 22 | 13 | 1 | 8 | 48 | 36 | +12 | 40 | Qualification to championship stage |
| 4 | Grevenmacher | 22 | 12 | 2 | 8 | 51 | 27 | +24 | 38 | Qualification to championship stage |
| 5 | Wiltz 71 | 22 | 9 | 7 | 6 | 36 | 27 | +9 | 34 | Qualification to relegation stage |
| 6 | UN Käerjéng 97 | 22 | 10 | 4 | 8 | 36 | 33 | +3 | 34 | Qualification to relegation stage |
| 7 | Racing FC | 22 | 10 | 4 | 8 | 31 | 30 | +1 | 34 | Qualification to relegation stage |
| 8 | Pétange | 22 | 10 | 2 | 10 | 29 | 33 | −4 | 32 | Qualification to relegation stage |
| 9 | Swift Hesperange | 22 | 6 | 8 | 8 | 31 | 37 | −6 | 26 | Qualification to relegation stage |
| 10 | Victoria Rosport | 22 | 6 | 5 | 11 | 24 | 42 | −18 | 23 | Qualification to relegation stage |
| 11 | Rumelange | 22 | 3 | 3 | 16 | 20 | 58 | −38 | 12 | Qualification to relegation stage |
| 12 | Avenir Beggen | 22 | 0 | 5 | 17 | 10 | 71 | −61 | 5 | Qualification to relegation stage |

=== Results ===
| Home \ Away | AVE | DUD | ETZ | GRE | JEU | KAE | PÉT | RAC | RUM | SWI | VIC | WIL |
|---|---|---|---|---|---|---|---|---|---|---|---|---|
| Avenir Beggen | | 1–1 | 1–3 | 0–11 | 0–1 | 0–3 | 1–2 | 1–1 | 1–2 | 1–5 | 1–1 | 0–5 |
| F91 Dudelange | 4–1 | | 3–1 | 1–2 | 2–0 | 4–0 | 5–1 | 5–0 | 6–1 | 3–1 | 3–0 | 2–0 |
| Etzella Ettelbruck | 5–0 | 1–0 | | 2–1 | 2–1 | 1–3 | 5–0 | 1–3 | 4–1 | 2–1 | 4–2 | 1–2 |
| Grevenmacher | 2–0 | 1–1 | 4–1 | | 0–2 | 2–1 | 2–1 | 0–2 | 4–0 | 3–0 | 0–1 | 3–1 |
| Jeunesse Esch | 8–0 | 0–3 | 3–0 | 4–2 | | 2–0 | 0–1 | 4–0 | 5–0 | 1–1 | 2–0 | 1–1 |
| UN Käerjéng 97 | 3–0 | 0–4 | 2–2 | 5–1 | 1–4 | | 3–1 | 2–1 | 1–0 | 1–1 | 1–0 | 2–0 |
| Pétange | 2–0 | 0–1 | 1–3 | 1–0 | 1–2 | 2–1 | | 1–2 | 4–2 | 1–0 | 2–0 | 1–1 |
| Racing FC | 0–0 | 1–0 | 1–0 | 0–2 | 0–1 | 1–0 | 1–3 | | 0–2 | 3–0 | 5–0 | 2–2 |
| Rumelange | 4–1 | 0–4 | 0–2 | 0–6 | 1–4 | 3–5 | 1–3 | 1–1 | | 1–1 | 0–0 | 1–3 |
| Swift Hesperange | 1–1 | 1–6 | 2–3 | 3–1 | 2–1 | 0–0 | 1–1 | 3–2 | 1–0 | | 2–2 | 2–0 |
| Victoria Rosport | 3–0 | 2–4 | 1–2 | 1–4 | 1–0 | 1–1 | 1–0 | 1–3 | 1–0 | 4–3 | | 2–2 |
| Wiltz 71 | 4–0 | 1–1 | 4–3 | 0–0 | 1–3 | 3–1 | 1–0 | 1–2 | 1–0 | 0–0 | 3–0 | |

Legend: Blue = home team win; Yellow = draw; Red = away team win.

== Second phase ==
=== Championship stage ===
==== Table ====
| Pos | Team | Pld | W | D | L | GF | GA | GD | Pts | Qualification |
|---|---|---|---|---|---|---|---|---|---|---|
| 1 | F91 Dudelange (C) | 28 | 20 | 4 | 4 | 83 | 22 | +61 | 64 | Qualification to Champions League first qualifying round |
| 2 | Jeunesse Esch | 28 | 17 | 2 | 9 | 58 | 36 | +22 | 53 | Qualification to UEFA Cup first qualifying round |
| 3 | Etzella Ettelbruck | 28 | 16 | 1 | 11 | 59 | 47 | +12 | 49 | Qualification to UEFA Cup first qualifying round |
| 4 | Grevenmacher | 28 | 13 | 3 | 12 | 58 | 39 | +19 | 42 | Qualification to Intertoto Cup first round |

(C) Champions

==== Results ====
| Home \ Away | DUD | ETZ | GRE | JEU |
|---|---|---|---|---|
| F91 Dudelange | | 3–2 | 0–0 | 9–0 |
| Etzella Ettelbruck | 1–4 | | 1–0 | 3–1 |
| Grevenmacher | 4–1 | 2–4 | | 1–4 |
| Jeunesse Esch | 1–4 | 3–1 | 1–0 | |

Legend: Blue = home team win; Yellow = draw; Red = away team win.

=== Relegation stage ===
==== Group A ====
===== Table =====
| Pos | Team | Pld | W | D | L | GF | GA | GD | Pts | Qualification |
|---|---|---|---|---|---|---|---|---|---|---|
| 1 | Wiltz 71 | 28 | 13 | 8 | 7 | 49 | 36 | +13 | 47 | |
| 2 | Racing FC | 28 | 12 | 5 | 11 | 40 | 39 | +1 | 41 | |
| 3 | Swift Hesperange | 28 | 9 | 9 | 10 | 41 | 44 | −3 | 36 | |
| 4 | Rumelange (R) | 28 | 4 | 4 | 20 | 25 | 70 | −45 | 16 | Qualification to Relegation play-offs |

(R) Relegated

===== Results =====
| Home \ Away | RAC | RUM | SWI | WIL |
|---|---|---|---|---|
| Racing FC | | 3–1 | 3–0 | 2–3 |
| Rumelange | 2–0 | | 1–1 | 0–3 |
| Swift Hesperange | 2–0 | 2–0 | | 5–1 |
| Wiltz 71 | 1–1 | 3–1 | 2–0 | |

Legend: Blue = home team win; Yellow = draw; Red = away team win.

==== Group B ====
===== Table =====
| Pos | Team | Pld | W | D | L | GF | GA | GD | Pts | Qualification |
|---|---|---|---|---|---|---|---|---|---|---|
| 1 | Pétange | 28 | 12 | 4 | 12 | 39 | 40 | −1 | 40 | |
| 2 | UN Käerjéng 97 | 28 | 10 | 7 | 11 | 44 | 46 | −2 | 37 | |
| 3 | Victoria Rosport | 28 | 8 | 8 | 12 | 34 | 50 | −16 | 32 | |
| 4 | Avenir Beggen (R) | 28 | 4 | 5 | 19 | 18 | 79 | −61 | 17 | Qualification to Relegation play-offs |

(R) Relegated

===== Results =====
| Home \ Away | AVE | KAE | PÉT | VIC |
|---|---|---|---|---|
| Avenir Beggen | | 3–2 | 1–0 | 1–4 |
| UN Käerjéng 97 | 0–1 | | 3–3 | 3–3 |
| Pétange | 2–0 | 3–0 | | 1–1 |
| Victoria Rosport | 0–2 | 0–0 | 2–1 | |

Legend: Blue = home team win; Yellow = draw; Red = away team win.

== Relegation play-offs ==
28 May 2006

| Avenir Beggen | 2–3 (a.e.t.) | FC Mondercange |

Stade rue de la Gare, Junglinster

28 May 2006

| US Rumelange | 0–0 (a.e.t.) | FC Mamer 32 |
Penalties
| | 3–4 |

Stade Municipal, Schifflange

== Top goalscorers ==
| Rank | Player | Club | Goals |
|---|---|---|---|
| 1 | (Turkey) Fatih Sözen | CS Grevenmacher | 23 |
| 2 | (France) Joris di Gregorio | F91 Dudelange | 22 |
| 2 | (Belgium) Fabrizio Rosamilia | FC Wiltz 71 | 22 |
| 4 | (Luxembourg) Daniel Huss | CS Grevenmacher | 18 |
| 5 | (France) Rudy Marchal | Jeunesse Esch | 17 |
| 6 | (Luxembourg) Daniel da Mota | Etzella Ettelbruck | 16 |
| 6 | (France) Stéphane Martine | F91 Dudelange | 16 |
| 8 | (Poland) Tomasz Gruszczyński | F91 Dudelange | 15 |
| 9 | (France) Sergio Pupovac | Racing FC | 14 |
| 10 | (Luxembourg) Carlo Pace | UN Käerjeng 97 | 13 |

== Team changes for 2006-07 season ==
After the 2005–06 season ended, the league was expanded from twelve teams to fourteen. The champions and runners-up of the Division of Honour, FC Differdange 03 and FC Progrès Niedercorn, were promoted automatically. After losing their relegation play-offs, Avenir Beggen and US Rumelange were relegated and replaced by FC Mondercange and FC Mamer 32.
