= 2004–05 Luxembourg National Division =

Luxembourg National Division
- Season: 2004–05
- Champions: F91 Dudelange (4th titles)
- Relegated: Spora; Union Luxembourg
- Champions League: F91 Dudelange
- UEFA Cup: Etzella Ettelbruck; Pétange (via cup)
- Intertoto Cup: Victoria Rosport
- Top goalscorer: Sergio Pupovac (24 goals)

The 2004–05 Luxembourg National Division was the 91st season of top level association football in Luxembourg. The competition ran from 7 August 2004 to 29 May 2005 with F91 Dudelange winning the title.

== Teams ==
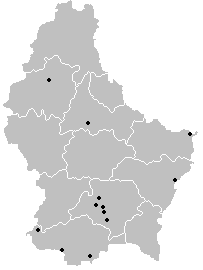
Locations of participating teams across Luxembourg

The 2004–05 season saw the National Division's roster of twelve clubs include:

- CS Alliance 01 (promoted from the Division of Honour)
- FC Avenir Beggen
- F91 Dudelange
- FC Etzella Ettelbruck
- CS Grevenmacher
- Jeunesse Esch (the reigning champions)
- CS Pétange (promoted from the Division of Honour)
- CA Spora Luxembourg
- FC Swift Hesperange
- Union Luxembourg
- FC Victoria Rosport
- FC Wiltz 71

== Format ==
The twelve teams completed the round-robin by playing each other twice (once home and once away) by 24 April. Then, the league divided into three. The top four teams were separated from the rest and formed the 'Title group' . The bottom eight teams were then subdivided into two groups of four, titled 'Relegation group A' and 'Relegation group B' . In the event, the top four were F91 Dudelange, FC Etzella Ettelbruck, Jeunesse Esch, and FC Victoria Rosport.

In each of the three mini-leagues, each team played each of the three other teams in the mini-league twice (once home and once away). To these results were added the 22 results of the first stage. The overall points totals (and goal difference, etc.) were used to determine each club's position in its respective mini-league.

After calculating the final results after 28 games, F91 Dudelange, the top team in the title group, was declared the league champion. The fourth-placed team in each of the relegation groups (Union Luxembourg and CA Spora Luxembourg in groups A and B respectively) was relegated to the Division of Honour.

This format is no longer used; the current season, 2006–07 uses a straightforward round-robin.

== European qualification ==
Luxembourg was assigned one spot in the first qualifying round of the UEFA Champions League, for the league champions; it was also assigned two spots in the first qualifying round of the UEFA Cup, for the runners-up and the winners of the Luxembourg Cup. As league champions, F91 Dudelange qualified for the Champions League. Etzella Ettelbruck qualified for the UEFA Cup as runners-up. CS Pétange qualified for the UEFA Cup by the Luxembourg Cup.

== First phase ==
=== Table ===
Pos	Team	Pld	W	D	L	GF	GA	GD	Pts	Qualification
1	F91 Dudelange	22	18	2	2	56	13	+43	56	Qualification to championship stage
2	Etzella Ettelbruck	22	17	1	4	57	23	+34	52	Qualification to championship stage
3	Jeunesse Esch	22	12	5	5	50	28	+22	41	Qualification to championship stage
4	Victoria Rosport	22	12	5	5	43	33	+10	41	Qualification to championship stage
5	Grevenmacher	22	9	5	8	40	27	+13	32	Qualification to relegation stage
6	Swift Hesperange	22	8	5	9	28	34	−6	29	Qualification to relegation stage
7	Alliance 01	22	8	4	10	31	47	−16	28	Qualification to relegation stage
8	Pétange	22	8	3	11	38	34	+4	27	Qualification to relegation stage
9	Wiltz 71	22	8	1	13	25	37	−12	25	Qualification to relegation stage
10	Spora Luxembourg	22	5	3	14	24	54	−30	18	Qualification to relegation stage
11	Union Luxembourg	22	3	5	14	14	44	−30	14	Qualification to relegation stage
12	Avenir Beggen	22	2	5	15	20	52	−32	11	Qualification to relegation stage

=== Results ===
Home \ Away	ALL	AVE	DUD	ETZ	GRE	JEU	PÉT	SPO	SWI	UNI	VIC	WIL
Alliance 01		2–2	0–2	1–4	1–1	0–7	3–2	2–5	0–1	3–1	1–3	1–0
Avenir Beggen	0–2		0–1	1–5	1–3	0–4	1–4	1–1	3–4	1–0	0–1	0–3
F91 Dudelange	3–0	3–0		0–1	2–1	5–1	2–0	7–0	2–1	1–1	4–2	3–1
Etzella Ettelbruck	2–4	5–0	0–1		2–1	3–1	3–1	3–0	3–0	5–0	3–1	2–0
Grevenmacher	5–0	2–1	1–5	0–1		1–1	0–0	1–1	3–0	1–2	0–2	3–0
Jeunesse Esch	2–2	1–1	0–3	2–2	0–2		0–3	4–2	0–0	3–1	3–0	1–0
Pétange	0–3	1–0	0–2	1–4	3–1	1–3		1–2	2–0	1–1	2–3	4–0
Spora Luxembourg	2–4	3–0	0–4	2–0	0–3	0–4	0–4		0–2	1–2	2–5	2–1
Swift Hesperange	1–1	1–3	2–1	0–1	1–5	0–1	3–3	2–0		2–2	1–1	1–2
Union Luxembourg	0–1	2–2	0–1	0–3	0–3	0–3	0–4	1–0	0–2		0–0	0–1
Victoria Rosport	3–0	1–1	2–2	4–1	2–1	1–6	1–0	1–1	1–2	5–1		2–1
Wiltz 71	1–0	3–2	0–2	3–4	2–2	1–3	2–1	2–0	0–2	1–0	1–2	

Legend: Blue = home team win; Yellow = draw; Red = away team win.

== Second phase ==
=== Championship stage ===
==== Table ====
Pos	Team	Pld	W	D	L	GF	GA	GD	Pts	Qualification
1	F91 Dudelange (C)	28	22	4	2	74	15	+59	70	Qualification to Champions League first qualifying round
2	Etzella Ettelbruck	28	20	4	4	68	29	+39	64	Qualification to UEFA Cup first qualifying round
3	Jeunesse Esch	28	13	6	9	58	45	+13	45	
4	Victoria Rosport	28	13	5	10	45	47	−2	44	Qualification to Intertoto Cup first round

(C) Champions

==== Results ====
Home \ Away	DUD	ETZ	JEU	VIC
F91 Dudelange		1–1	7–1	5–0
Etzella Ettelbruck	0–0		1–1	2–0
Jeunesse Esch	0–4	3–4		3–0
Victoria Rosport	0–1	1–3	1–0	

Legend: Blue = home team win; Yellow = draw; Red = away team win.

=== Relegation stage ===
==== Group A ====
===== Table =====
Pos	Team	Pld	W	D	L	GF	GA	GD	Pts	Relegation
1	Alliance 01	28	12	5	11	45	54	−9	41	
2	Grevenmacher	28	11	7	10	57	40	+17	40	
3	Wiltz 71	28	8	2	18	30	56	−26	26	
4	Union Luxembourg (R)	28	6	7	15	26	53	−27	25	Relegation to Luxembourg Division of Honour

(R) Relegated

===== Results =====
Home \ Away	ALL	GRE	UNI	WIL
Alliance 01		2–2	3–1	4–0
Grevenmacher	2–3		2–3	4–3
Union Luxembourg	2–0	2–2		4–2
Wiltz 71	0–2	0–5	0–0	

Legend: Blue = home team win; Yellow = draw; Red = away team win.

==== Group B ====
===== Table =====
Pos	Team	Pld	W	D	L	GF	GA	GD	Pts	Relegation
1	Swift Hesperange	28	11	6	11	39	46	−7	39	
2	Pétange	28	10	5	13	50	45	+5	35	Qualification to UEFA Cup first qualifying round
3	Avenir Beggen	28	6	6	16	37	60	−23	24	
4	Spora Luxembourg (R)	28	5	5	18	29	68	−39	20	Relegation to Luxembourg Division of Honour

(R) Relegated

===== Results =====
Home \ Away	AVE	SPO	SWI	PÉT
Avenir Beggen		1–0	2–3	3–3
Spora Luxembourg	1–5		2–3	0–3
Swift Hesperange	0–3	1–1		1–0
Pétange	1–3	1–1	4–3	

Legend: Blue = home team win; Yellow = draw; Red = away team win.

== Top goalscorers ==
Rank	Player	Club	Goals
1	(France) Sergio Pupovac	CS Alliance 01	24
2	(Luxembourg) Daniel Huss	CS Grevenmacher	21
3	(France) Stéphane Martine	F91 Dudelange	20
4	(Luxembourg) Laurent Dutheil	CS Pétange	19
5	(Luxembourg) Patrick Grettnich	Etzella Ettelbruck	15
6	(Luxembourg) Philippe Dürrer	Swift Hesperange	13
6	(France) Ahmed El Aouad	CS Grevenmacher	13
6	(Luxembourg) Luc Mischo	Etzella Ettelbruck	13
6	(Germany) Frank Wagner	Victoria Rosport	13
6	(Germany) Stefan Wagner	Jeunesse Esch	13
6	(Germany) Patrick Zöllner	Victoria Rosport	13

== Team changes for 2005–06 season ==
The champions and runners-up of the Division of Honour, UN Käerjeng 97 and US Rumelange, were promoted automatically.

After the 2004–05 season ended, the two relegated clubs, Spora Luxembourg and Union Luxembourg, went ahead with the pre-arranged amalgamation with CS Alliance 01, another National Division club based in Luxembourg City. The new club, Racing FC Union Luxembourg, took Alliance 01's place in the National Division, leaving no teams to be relegated to the Division of Honour.
