= Philippe Felgen =

Luxembourgish footballer

Personal information
- Date of birth: 8 October 1975 (age 51)
- Position: Goalkeeper

Senior career*
Years	Team	Apps	(Gls)
1995–2000	Jeunesse Esch		
2003–2004	F91 Dudelange		
2004–2005	Etzella Ettelbruck		
2005–2006	Progrès Niederkorn		
2006–2007	CS Oberkorn		
2007–2010	Progrès Niederkorn		
2010–2012	CS Pétange		

International career
- Luxembourg U21
1998–1999	Luxembourg	8	(0)
- * Club domestic league appearances and goals

Philippe Felgen (born 8 October 1975) is a retired Luxembourgish football goalkeeper.
