= Kevin Holtz =

Luxembourgish footballer

Personal information
- Date of birth: 6 March 1993 (age 33)
- Place of birth: Ettelbruck, Luxembourg
- Height: 1.73 m (5 ft 8 in)
- Position: Midfielder

Senior career*
Years	Team	Apps	(Gls)
2010–2020	Etzella Ettelbruck	159	(39)
2013	→ Erpeldange 72 (loan)		
2020–2023	Progrès Niederkorn	9	(0)
2022	→ FC Atert Bissen (loan)	11	(1)
2023–2024	Mertzig		

International career^{‡}
2012	Luxembourg U21	1	(0)
2019	Luxembourg	1	(0)
- * Club domestic league appearances and goals as of 31 May 2025 ‡ National team caps and goals as of 2 June 2019 (UTC)

Kevin Holtz (born 6 March 1993) is a former Luxembourgish footballer who played as a midfielder and was capped by the Luxembourg national team.

== Club career ==
On 18 December 2021, he was loaned to FC Atert Bissen for 6 months.

== International career ==
Holtz made his international debut for Luxembourg on 2 June 2019 in a friendly match against Madagascar, which finished as a 3–3 draw.

== Personal life ==
Holtz's father, Luc, is a former Luxembourg international footballer and the manager of the Luxembourg national team.

== Career statistics ==
=== International ===
As of 2 June 2019

Luxembourg
Year	Apps	Goals
2019	1	0
Total	1	0
