= 1990–91 Luxembourg National Division =

Luxembourg National Division
- Season: 1990–91

The 1990–91 Luxembourg National Division was the 77th season of top level association football in Luxembourg.

== Overview ==
It was performed in 10 teams, and Union Luxembourg won the championship.

== First phase ==
=== Table ===
Pos	Team	Pld	W	D	L	GF	GA	GD	Pts	Qualification
1	Union Luxembourg	18	14	2	2	49	14	+35	30	Qualification to championship stage
2	Jeunesse Esch	18	9	6	3	32	22	+10	24	Qualification to championship stage
3	CA Spora Luxembourg	18	11	1	6	34	30	+4	23	Qualification to championship stage
4	FC Avenir Beggen	18	8	4	6	37	24	+13	20	Qualification to championship stage
5	CS Grevenmacher	18	10	0	8	29	25	+4	20	Qualification to championship stage
6	FC Swift Hesperange	18	7	5	6	36	29	+7	19	Qualification to championship stage
7	FA Red Boys Differdange	18	9	0	9	28	30	−2	18	Qualification to relegation stage
8	FC Progrès Niedercorn	18	6	3	9	23	33	−10	15	Qualification to relegation stage
9	CS Fola Esch	18	4	1	13	10	40	−30	9	Qualification to relegation stage
10	FC Aris Bonnevoie	18	0	2	16	7	38	−31	2	Qualification to relegation stage

Source: rsssf.com

=== Results ===
Home \ Away	ARI	AVE	FOL	GRE	JEU	PRO	RBD	SPO	SWI	UNI
Aris Bonnevoie		1–2	0–2	0–3	0–0	0–3	1–3	0–3	1–2	0–2
Avenir Beggen	2–1		8–0	2–1	1–3	1–1	5–4	3–0	1–1	1–2
Fola Esch	2–0	0–0		0–2	0–1	0–2	0–2	0–3	1–3	0–1
Grevenmacher	1–0	2–1	6–1		3–0	1–0	5–0 (Note: The match between Grevenmacher and Red Boys Differdange ended with 0–2, but was rated 5–0 for Grevenmacher.)	0–4	2–1	1–3
Jeunesse Esch	1–1	1–5	2–0	3–0		4–2	2–1	0–3	1–1	1–0
Progrès Niederkorn	4–1	1–0	0–2	2–0	1–1		0–1	2–3	1–1	0–8
Red Boys Differdange	1–0	1–0	2–0	1–0	0–3	0–2		4–0	2–4	1–2
Spora Luxembourg	4–1	2–2	0–1	1–0	0–5	2–1	2–0		2–1	2–4
Swift Hesperange	2–1	0–1	3–3	1–2	3–3	6–2	2–5	1–2		2–1
Union Luxembourg	1–0	3–2	6–0	5–0	1–1	2–1	2–0	5–1	1–1	

Legend: Blue = home team win; Yellow = draw; Red = away team win.

== Second phase ==
=== Championship stage ===
==== Table ====
Pos	Team	Pld	W	D	L	GF	GA	GD	BP	Pts
1	Union Luxembourg	10	5	3	2	12	8	+4	15	28
2	Jeunesse Esch	10	5	3	2	16	9	+7	12	25
3	CA Spora Luxembourg	10	4	3	3	17	11	+6	11.5	22.5
4	FC Avenir Beggen	10	6	0	4	19	14	+5	10	22
5	CS Grevenmacher	10	2	2	6	13	24	−11	10	16
6	FC Swift Hesperange	10	2	1	7	12	23	−11	9.5	14.5

Source: rsssf.com

==== Results ====
Home \ Away	AVE	GRE	JEU	SPO	SWI
Avenir Beggen		6–0	1–3	3–1	1–0
Grevenmacher	1–2		0–1	1–0	5–2
Jeunesse Esch	1–2	2–2		2–2	2–1
Spora Luxembourg	4–1	4–0	0–3		3–0
Swift Hesperange	2–1	3–3	0–2	0–2	

Legend: Blue = home team win; Yellow = draw; Red = away team win.

=== Relegation/Promotion stage ===
==== Group A ====
===== Table =====
Pos	Team	Pld	W	D	L	GF	GA	GD	Pts
1	FC Wiltz 71	10	7	1	2	23	15	+8	22
2	FA Red Boys Differdange	10	5	1	4	13	9	+4	16
3	Jeunesse Wasserbillig	10	5	1	4	13	9	+4	16
4	CS Fola Esch	10	5	0	5	15	17	−2	15
5	FC Etzella Ettelbruck	10	3	1	6	9	14	−5	10
6	FC Victoria Rosport	10	3	0	7	14	23	−9	9

Source: rsssf.com

===== Results =====
Home \ Away	ETZ	FOL	WAS	RBD	VIC	WIL
Etzella Ettelbruck		1–2	1–0	1–3	2–1	0–1
Fola Esch	0–3		2–1	2–3	2–3	2–1
Jeunesse Wasserbillig	4–1	1–0		1–0	2–1	2–2
Red Boys Differdange	0–0	0–1	1–0		3–0	1–2
Victoria Rosport	2–0	1–2	1–0	0–1		4–7
Wiltz 71	1–0	3–2	0–2	2–1	4–1	

Legend: Blue = home team win; Yellow = draw; Red = away team win.

==== Group B ====
===== Table =====
Pos	Team	Pld	W	D	L	GF	GA	GD	Pts
1	FC Koeppchen Wormeldange	10	6	1	3	17	12	+5	19
2	FC Aris Bonnevoie	10	3	7	0	11	6	+5	16
3	FC Progrès Niedercorn	10	4	4	2	17	14	+3	16
4	CS Sanem	10	2	4	4	9	10	−1	10
5	AS Differdange	10	1	6	3	8	13	−5	9
6	CS Pétange	10	1	4	5	9	16	−7	7

Source: rsssf.com

===== Results =====
Home \ Away	ARI	DIF	KOE	PÉT	PRO	SAN
Aris Bonnevoie		0–0	1–1	2–1	2–0	1–1
AS Differdange	0–0		1–3	2–1	1–1	0–1
Koeppchen Wormeldange	0–2	3–0		2–0	3–1	2–0
Pétange	0–0	1–1	2–0		1–1	2–2
Progrès Niederkorn	3–3	2–2	4–1	3–1		1–0
Sanem	0–0	1–1	1–2	3–0	0–1	

Legend: Blue = home team win; Yellow = draw; Red = away team win.
