= Mikhail Zaritskiy =

Luxembourgish footballer

Personal information
- Date of birth: 3 January 1973 (age 53)
- Place of birth: Leningrad, Russian SFSR
- Height: 1.82 m (6 ft 0 in)
- Position: Striker

Team information
- Current team: Marisca Mersch (manager)

Senior career*
Years	Team	Apps	(Gls)
1989–1991	Zenit Leningrad	10	(1)
1991–1993	Borussia Mönchengladbach II		
1993–1996	Avenir Beggen	67	(42)
1996–1998	Sporting Mertzig	38	(48)
1998–1999	Fortuna Köln	7	(0)
1999–2000	Agios Nikolaos	20	(10)
2000–2002	Sporting Mertzig	32	(29)

International career
1999–2002	Luxembourg	15	(0)

Managerial career
- 2010–2014: Berdorf-Consdorf
- 2014–2015: Blue Boys Muhlenbach
- 2015–2016: Vinesca Ehnen
- 2017–2020: Daring-Club Echternach
- 2020: CS Grevenmacher
- 2020–2021: Daring-Club Echternach
- 2022–: Marisca Mersch
- * Club domestic league appearances and goals

Mikhail Zaritskiy (Russian: Михаил Зарицкий; born 3 January 1973) is a retired Luxembourgish professional footballer. He was born in Leningrad, now St. Petersburg, Russian SFSR, grew up in the Soviet Union and later gained Luxembourg citizenship through marriage.

Zaritskiy spent most of his career in Luxembourg, starting with Avenir Beggen and having two spells at Sporting Mertzig, either side of a spell in Germany and Greece. In his seven years playing in the Luxembourg National Division, Zaritskiy was the league's top goal-scorer four times. He was named Luxembourgish Footballer of the Year twice.

== Honours ==
- Luxembourg National Division: 1994
- Luxembourgish Footballer of the Year: 1997, 1998
- Luxembourg National Division top scorer: 1996 (18 goals), 1997 (19 goals), 1998 (29 goals), 2001 (23 goals)
