= Carlo Weis =

Luxembourgish footballer (born 1958)

Personal information
- Date of birth: 4 December 1958 (age 67)
- Place of birth: Luxembourg City, Luxembourg
- Position: Defender

Senior career*
Years	Team	Apps	(Gls)
1977–1979	Spora Luxembourg		
1979–1982	F.C. Winterslag	87	(5)
1982–1983	Reims	12	(2)
1983–1988	Spora Luxembourg	26	(7)
1988–1989	Thionville		
1989–1995	Avenir Beggen	138	(27)
1995–1997	Sporting Mertzig	36	(2)
1997–2000	Avenir	27	(1)
Total		326	(44)

International career
1978–1998	Luxembourg	87	(1)

Managerial career
- 1995–1997: Sporting Mertzig
- 1997–2000: Avenir
- 2000–2004: F91 Dudelange
- 2004–2005: Swift Hesperange
- * Club domestic league appearances and goals

Carlo Weis (born 4 December 1958) is a Luxembourgish former professional footballer who played as a defender. He was Luxembourg's most capped player of all-time from November 1995 until Jeff Strasser overtook his tally in 2008.

== Club career ==
A central defender, Weis started his career at local side Spora Luxembourg before joining Belgian side F.C. Winterslag aged 20. With Winterslag, he reached the round of 16 in the 1981–82 UEFA Cup, having beaten Arsenal in the previous round. He played three seasons for the Genk outfit and then moved across the border to join Stade Reims. He rejoined Spora after only one season in France and played another five seasons for them. After one year at Thionville, he moved on to Avenir Beggen for whom he played eight seasons, interrupted by two seasons at Sporting Mertzig where he also took up the manager's post. While with Avenir, he claimed the 1990 Luxembourgish Footballer of the Year award.

Weis retired as a player at the end of the 1999–2000 season, aged 41.

== International career ==
Weis made his debut for Luxembourg in a March 1978 friendly match against Poland. In an international career spanning over 20 years, he went on to earn a record-breaking 87 caps, scoring one goal. He played in 30 World Cup qualification matches.

He played his final international game in May 1998, a friendly match against Cameroon.

== Career statistics ==
Scores and results list Luxembourg's goal tally first.

#	Date	Venue	Opponent	Score	Result	Competition
1	12 October 1991	Stade Municipal, Luxembourg (city), Luxembourg	Portugal	1–1	1–1	Friendly match

== Honours ==
- Luxembourg National Division: 1993, 1994
- Luxembourg Cup: 1992, 1993, 1994
- Luxembourgish Footballer of the Year: 1990
