= 2002–03 Luxembourg National Division =

Luxembourg National Division
- Season: 2002–03
- Champions: Grevenmacher (1st title)
- Relegated: Progrès Niederkorn; Sporting Mertzig
- Champions League: Grevenmacher
- UEFA Cup: F91 Dudelange
- Intertoto Cup: Union Luxembourg

The 2002–03 Luxembourg National Division was the 89th season of top level association football in Luxembourg.

== Overview ==
It was performed in 12 teams, and Grevenmacher won the championship.

== First phase ==
=== Table ===
Pos	Team	Pld	W	D	L	GF	GA	GD	Pts	Qualification
1	F91 Dudelange	22	14	3	5	60	27	+33	45	Qualification to championship stage
2	Grevenmacher	22	13	5	4	56	21	+35	44	Qualification to championship stage
3	Union Luxembourg	22	11	6	5	40	28	+12	39	Qualification to championship stage
4	Jeunesse Esch	22	10	8	4	42	23	+19	38	Qualification to championship stage
5	Swift Hesperange	22	10	7	5	53	32	+21	37	Qualification to relegation stage
6	Mondercange	22	11	2	9	51	44	+7	35	Qualification to relegation stage
7	Rumelange	22	10	3	9	45	49	−4	33	Qualification to relegation stage
8	Wiltz 71	22	7	4	11	30	42	−12	25	Qualification to relegation stage
9	Victoria Rosport	22	6	7	9	32	50	−18	25	Qualification to relegation stage
10	Avenir Beggen	22	7	3	12	44	56	−12	24	Qualification to relegation stage
11	Progrès Niederkorn	22	5	0	17	22	68	−46	15	Qualification to relegation stage
12	Sporting Mertzig	22	4	0	18	23	58	−35	12	Qualification to relegation stage

Source: rsssf.com

=== Results ===
Home \ Away	AVE	DUD	GRE	JEU	MON	PRO	RUM	MER	SWI	UNI	VIC	WIL
Avenir Beggen		0–1	2–4	2–2	3–1	5–1	2–1	4–1	1–3	0–2	2–3	2–2
F91 Dudelange	4–2		2–0	0–3 (Note: The matches Union Luxembourg – F91 Dudelange, Mondercange – F91 Düdelingen, Rumelange – F91 Dudelange and F91 Dudelange – Jeunesse Esch were each rated 3–0 for the opponent, as F91 Dudelange had too many foreigners on the field.)	3–1	4–0	6–0	4–0	1–1	4–0	5–0	5–3
Grevenmacher	4–0	3–0		1–1	0–1	4–0	5–0	0–3 (Note: The match between Grevenmacher and Sporting Mertzig was originally ended 1–0, but was rated 0–3 for Mertzig, as Grevenmacher had an unauthorized player in their ranks.)	2–2	1–1	4–1	0–1
Jeunesse Esch	3–1	1–1	2–3		2–1	3–1	4–0	3–1	0–2	1–1	1–1	2–0
Mondercange	2–2	3–0	0–5	1–1		2–0	2–3	4–3	3–2	3–0	7–3	2–1
Progrès Niederkorn	5–1	0–6	2–4	1–4	0–4		0–1	2–0	0–6	0–2	2–1	2–3
Rumelange	5–1	3–0	2–6	1–2	2–1	4–2		6–1	4–3	0–2	1–1	0–1
Sporting Mertzig	0–2	1–2	0–3	0–5	4–2	1–2	1–2		0–1	1–5	4–1	1–3
Swift Hesperange	5–2	1–3	0–5	2–0	0–3	7–0	3–3	2–0		1–1	1–1	4–0
Union Luxembourg	1–4	3–0	0–0	1–0	5–3	0–1	1–3	4–0	3–3		1–0	3–2
Victoria Rosport	5–2	0–7	1–2	1–1	1–4	3–1	3–3	1–0	0–0	1–1		2–1
Wiltz 71	1–4	2–2	0–0	1–1	4–1	3–0	2–1	0–1	0–4	0–3	0–2	

Legend: Blue = home team win; Yellow = draw; Red = away team win.

== Second phase ==
=== Championship stage ===
==== Table ====
Pos	Team	Pld	W	D	L	GF	GA	GD	Pts	Qualification
1	Grevenmacher (C)	28	18	5	5	68	28	+40	59	Qualification to Champions League first qualifying round
2	F91 Dudelange	28	16	4	8	66	34	+32	52	Qualification to UEFA Cup qualifying round
3	Jeunesse Esch	28	13	9	6	54	30	+24	48	
4	Union Luxembourg	28	12	6	10	43	40	+3	42	Qualification to Intertoto Cup first round

Source: rsssf.com
(C) Champions

==== Results ====
Home \ Away	DUD	GRE	JEU	UNI
F91 Dudelange		0–1	1–0	3–0
Grevenmacher	4–1		5–3	1–0
Jeunesse Esch	0–0	3–0		5–1
Union Luxembourg	2–1	0–1	0–1	

Legend: Blue = home team win; Yellow = draw; Red = away team win.

=== Relegation stage ===
==== Group A ====
===== Table =====
Pos	Team	Pld	W	D	L	GF	GA	GD	Pts	Relegation
1	Swift Hesperange	28	14	9	5	66	37	+29	51	
2	Victoria Rosport	28	10	8	10	44	55	−11	38	
3	Rumelange	28	11	4	13	51	63	−12	37	
4	Progrès Niederkorn (R)	28	6	0	22	29	82	−53	18	Relegation to Luxembourg Division of Honour

Source: rsssf.com
(R) Relegated

===== Results =====
Home \ Away	PRO	RUM	SWI	VIC
Progrès Niederkorn		2–3	0–1	0–3
Rumelange	0–2		0–0	1–2
Swift Hesperange	5–2	4–2		1–1
Victoria Rosport	2–1	4–0	0–2	

Legend: Blue = home team win; Yellow = draw; Red = away team win.

==== Group B ====
===== Table =====
Pos	Team	Pld	W	D	L	GF	GA	GD	Pts	Relegation
1	Mondercange	28	14	2	12	64	56	+8	44	
2	Avenir Beggen	28	11	4	13	57	64	−7	37	
3	Wiltz 71	28	9	5	14	40	53	−13	32	
4	Sporting Mertzig (R)	28	6	0	22	36	76	−40	18	Relegation to Luxembourg Division of Honour

Source: rsssf.com
(R) Relegated

===== Results =====
Home \ Away	AVE	MON	MER	WIL
Avenir Beggen		4–1	4–2	3–2
Mondercange	1–2		3–5	3–0
Sporting Mertzig	2–0	1–3		1–5
Wiltz 71	0–0	0–2	3–2	

Legend: Blue = home team win; Yellow = draw; Red = away team win.
