= Djamalidine Atoiyi =

French footballer (born 1997)

Djamalidine Atoyiyi
Personal information
- Full name: Djamalidine Atoiyi
- Date of birth: 5 August 1997 (age 29)
- Place of birth: Dzaoudzi, Mayotte, France
- Height: 1.83 m (6 ft 0 in)
- Position: Midfielder

Team information
- Current team: Schifflange 95
- Number: 10

Youth career
- 2005–2006: Bouge Kalliste
- 2006–2008: SC Air Bel
- 2008–2012: RC Lons-le-Saunier
- 2012–2016: Troyes

Senior career*
Years	Team	Apps	(Gls)
2015–2019	Troyes B	62	(10)
2016	Troyes	1	(0)
2019–2020	Thonon Evian	0	(0)
2020–2021	Saint-Priest	8	(2)
2021	Martigues	3	(0)
2022	Marseille Endoume	7	(0)
2022–2025	Schifflange 95	65	(5)
2026–2026	Fola Esch	8	(0)
2026–	Schifflange 95	0	(0)

International career^{‡}
2017–	Comoros	3	(0)
- * Club domestic league appearances and goals as of 13 June 2026 ‡ National team caps and goals as of 07:58, 16 January 2022 (UTC)

Djamalidine Atoyiyi (born 5 August 1997) is professional footballer who plays as a midfielder for Schifflange 95. Born in Mayotte, France, he plays for the Comoros national team.

== Club career ==
Atoiyi made his professional debut with Troyes in a 1–1 Ligue 2 tie with Auxerre on 9 December 2016.

== International career ==
Atoiyi made his debut with the Comoros national team in a 0–0 friendly tie with Mauritania on 6 October 2017.
