= Frédéric Cicchirillo =

French footballer (born 1972)

Personal information
- Date of birth: 26 September 1972 (age 54)
- Place of birth: Metz
- Position: Forward

Senior career*
Years	Team	Apps	(Gls)
1989–1993	FC Metz		
1993–1997	SAS Épinal		
1997–1998	US Raon-l'Étape		
1998–2001	Sporting Mertzig		
2001–2007	F91 Dudelange		
- * Club domestic league appearances and goals

Frédéric Cicchirillo (born 26 September 1972) is a French former footballer who played as a striker. He became Luxembourg National Division top goalscorer in 1998–99 and 2001–02, and awarded Luxembourgish Footballer of the Year in 2002. Before that he played in two Ligue 2 seasons with SAS Épinal.
