= Denis Scuto =

Luxembourgish historian and footballer (born 1964)

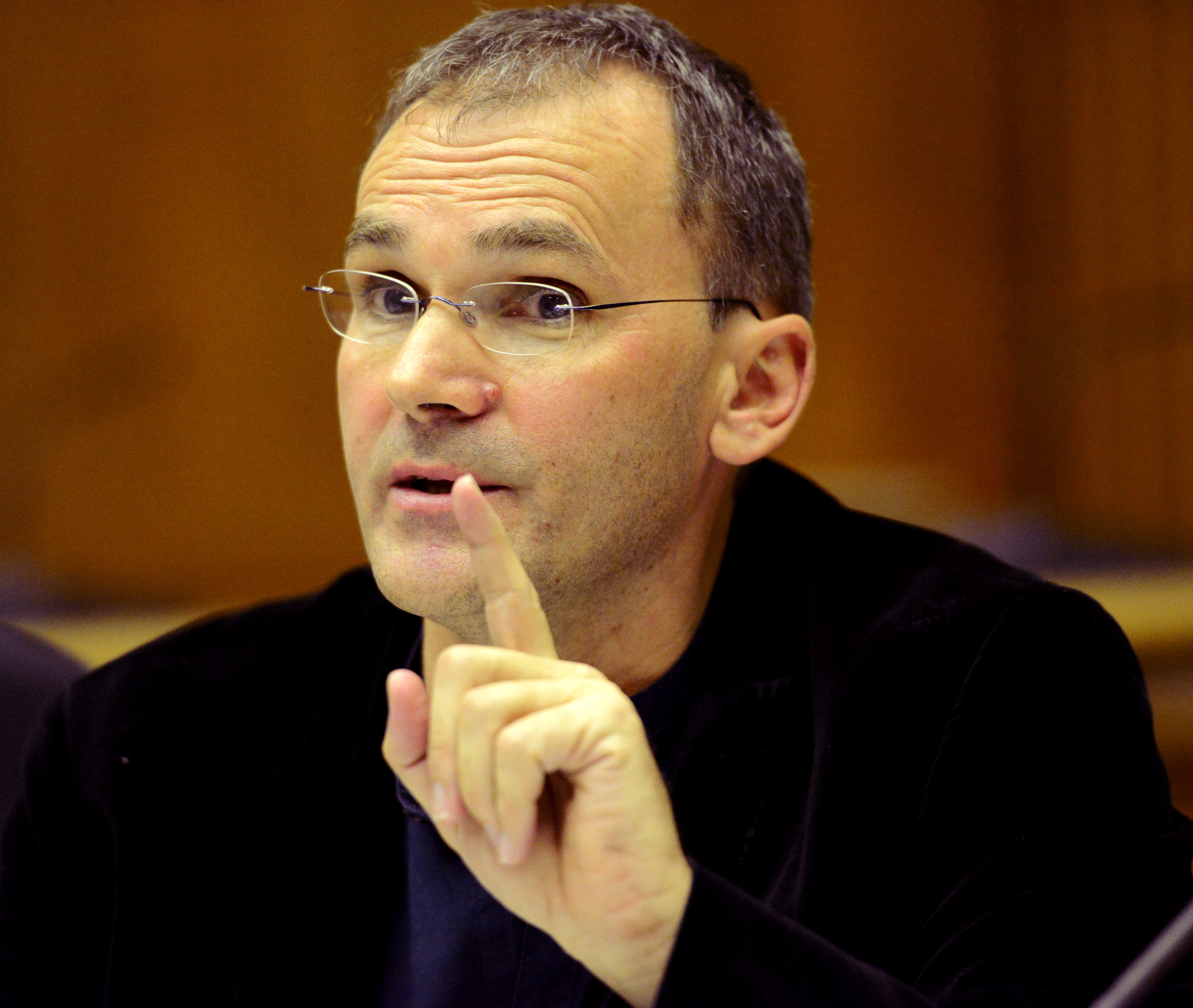
- Scuto in November 2013

Personal information
- Date of birth: 13 November 1964 (age 61)
- Place of birth: Esch-sur-Alzette, Luxembourg
- Position: Midfielder

Senior career*
Years	Team	Apps	(Gls)
1981–2002	Jeunesse Esch	424	

International career
1988–1993	Luxembourg	7	(0)
- * Club domestic league appearances and goals

Denis Scuto (born 13 November 1964) is a Luxembourgish historian and retired football midfielder.

== Football career ==
=== Club ===
He was voted Luxembourgish Footballer of the Year for the 1987–88 season. He played a club record 424 league games for Jeunesse Esch, winning 9 league titles and 4 domestic cups with them.

=== International ===
Scuto made his debut for Luxembourg in a September 1988 World Cup qualification match against Switzerland and earned a total of 7 caps (no goals). His final international was another World Cup qualifier, against Iceland in May 1993.

== As historian ==
Scuto completed his Bachelor's degree in History at the Université libre de Bruxelles (ULB) in 1988, with a thesis entitled "Sous le signe de la grande grève de mars 1921. Les années sans pareilles du mouvement ouvrier luxembourgeois, 1918-1923" (lit. Under the sign of the great strike of March 1921. The unparalleled years of the Luxembourg labor movement, 1918–1923). From 1989 onwards, he served as a secondary school history teacher in Echternach and Esch-sur-Alzette. He completed a further thesis as part of his teachers' training internship in 1992, entitled "Le monde de l’ouvrier mineur et de l’ouvrier d’usine. Vie et travail dans le bassin minier luxembourgeois (1870-1914)" (lit. The world of the miner and the factory worker. Life and work in the Luxembourgish mining basin (1870-1914)."

From 2003, he has served as an academic historian at the University of Luxembourg.

He completed his PhD at the ULB in 2009 with a doctoral thesis titled "Histoire de la nationalité luxembourgeoise (1839-1940). Une histoire sous influence française, belge et allemande" (The Luxembourgish nationality (1839–1940): A history under French, Belgian, and German influence).

Scuto served on the board of the Centre de Documentation sur les Migrations Humaines (CDMH, lit. Documentation centre on human migrations) in Dudelange from 2018 to April 2025. In March 2025, he was named Chair of History and Migrations at the University of Luxembourg's Centre for Contemporary and Digital History (C2DH). He continues to work as a consultant for the CDMH.

== Selected publications ==
- Sous le signe de la grande grève de mars 1921. Les années sans pareilles du mouvement ouvrier luxembourgeois (1918-1923) (Luxembourg: éditpress, 1990).
- Industriekultur in Esch. Eine stadtgeschichtliche Wanderung durch die Luxemburger Minettemetropole (Luxembourg: Éditions Le Phare, 1993).
- (With Antoinette Lorang) La maison d'en face – Das Haus gegenüber (Luxembourg: Éditions Le Phare, 1995).
- (With René Leboutte and Jean Puissant) Un siècle d'histoire industrielle. Belgique, Luxembourg, Pays-Bas. Industrialisation et sociétés (1873-1973) (Paris: SEDES, 1998).
- Chambre de Travail Luxembourg. 75e anniversaire 1924-1999 (Luxembourg, 1999).
- (With Foni Le Brun-Ricalens and Florent Le Mené) Un voyage à travers les âges: le projet des coffrets pédagogiques; Les coffrets sur la préhistoire: une autre initiation à l'histoire / Eine Reise in die Vergangenheit: das Museum im Koffer ; Die Koffer zur Steinzeit: eine andere Einführung in die Geschichte (Luxembourg: Education nationale, 2001).
- Gëscht am Doppelpass mat haut. Iwwer Aktualitéit a Geschicht fräi geschwat: 5 Joer Carte blanche op RTL (Esch-sur-Alzette: Éditions Le Phare, 2004).
- (With Christophe Knebeler) Belval - Passé, présent et avenir d'un site luxembourgeois exceptionnel (1911-2011) (Esch-sur-Alzette: Éditions Le Phare, 2010).
- La nationalité luxembourgeoise (19e-21e siècle). Histoire d'un alliage européen (Brussels: Éditions de l'Université de Bruxelles, 2012).
- Chroniques sur l'an 40. Les autorités luxembourgeoises et le sort des juifs persécutés (Luxembourg: Éd. Fondation Robert Krieps, 2016).
- (With Frédéric Krier, Jacques Maas and Arnaud Sauer) 100 Joer fräi Gewerkschaften 1916-2016. Contributions à l'histoire du mouvement syndical luxembourgeois (Esch-sur-Alzette: OGB-L/Éditions Le Phare, 2016).
- (With Georges Buchler, Architekt, Antoinette Lorang, Antoinette Reuter, Christof Weber) Esch-sur-Alzette. Guide historique et architectural, (Esch-sur-Alzette: capybarabooks / C2DH / Uni.lu / Ville d'Esch-sur-Alzette, 2020).
- (With Susanne Jaspers) This Hard Minett Land (Mersch: capybarabooks, 2022).
