= Ahmed El Aouad =

French-Moroccan footballer (born 1971)

Personal information
- Date of birth: November 27, 1971 (age 54)
- Place of birth: France
- Height: 1.68 m (5 ft 6 in)
- Position: Attacking midfielder

Senior career*
Years	Team	Apps	(Gls)
1989–1997	CS Sedan		
1997–2001	Jeunesse Arlonaise		
2001–2002	CS Hobscheid	138	(66)
2002–2005	CS Grevenmacher	51	(28)
2005–2006	F91 Dudelange	24	(6)
2007–2009	CS Fola Esch		
- * Club domestic league appearances and goals

Ahmed El Aouad (born 27 November 1971) is a retired French-Moroccan footballer. An attacking midfielder, El Aouad played for most of his career in Luxembourg, for CS Hobscheid, CS Grevenmacher, F91 Dudelange, and CS Fola Esch.

He won the award for Luxembourgish Footballer of the Year, awarded to the best player in the National Division, twice: once whilst with CS Hobscheid (2001) and again with CS Grevenmacher (2003). He also played for F91 Dudelange, with whom he won the championship. His best goal-scoring tally was in 2004-05, when he scored 13 goals in the league, placing him joint-sixth in the goalscoring charts overall.

== Honours ==
- Luxembourg National Division: 2

2003, 2006

- Luxembourg Cup: 2

2003, 2006

- Luxembourgish Footballer of the Year: 2

2001, 2003
