= Claude Ganser =

Luxembourgish footballer

Personal information
- Date of birth: 7 September 1967 (age 59)
- Position: Defender

Senior career*
Years	Team	Apps	(Gls)
1986–1991	Union Luxembourg		
1991–1988	Jeunesse Esch		
1999–2001	F91 Dudelange		

International career
1992–1997	Luxembourg	9	(0)
- * Club domestic league appearances and goals

Claude Ganser (born 7 September 1967) is a retired Luxembourgish football defender. He was awarded Luxembourgish Footballer of the Year in 1992.
