= 2006–07 Luxembourg National Division =

Luxembourg National Division
- Season: 2006–07
- Champions: F91 Dudelange (6th titles)
- Relegated: Mamer 32; Mondercange
- Champions League: F91 Dudelange
- UEFA Cup: Etzella Ettelbruck; UN Käerjéng 97 (via cup)
- Intertoto Cup: Differdange 03
- Top goalscorer: Daniel da Mota (24 goals)

The 2006–07 Luxembourg National Division was the 93rd season of top level association football in Luxembourg. The competition ran from 5 August 2006 to 30 May 2007. F91 Dudelange continued their domination of the National Division by winning their third league title in a row; Dudelange also won the Luxembourg Cup to complete the Double.

== Teams ==
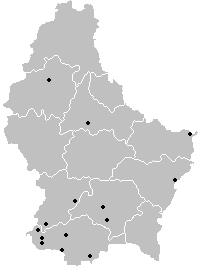
Locations of participating teams across Luxembourg

The National Division was expanded from the 2005–06 season's complement of twelve teams to fourteen. Those fourteen clubs were:

Club	Town	2005–06 Season
FC Differdange 03	Differdange	Division of Honour, 1st
F91 Dudelange	Dudelange	1st
FC Etzella Ettelbruck	Ettelbruck	3rd
CS Grevenmacher	Grevenmacher	4th
Jeunesse Esch	Esch-sur-Alzette	2nd
UN Käerjeng 97	Bascharage	6th
FC Mamer 32	Mamer	Division of Honour, 4th
FC Mondercange	Mondercange	Division of Honour, 3rd
CS Pétange	Pétange	8th
FC Progrès Niedercorn	Niederkorn	Division of Honour, 2nd
Racing FC Union Luxembourg	Luxembourg City	7th
FC Swift Hesperange	Hesperange	9th
FC Victoria Rosport	Rosport	10th
FC Wiltz 71	Wiltz	5th

== Format ==
Unlike in previous seasons, when a more complicated system was used, the 2006–07 season involved only a round-robin among the fourteen teams. Thus, each team played 26 games over the course of the calendar.

== European qualification ==
Luxembourg was assigned one spot in the first qualifying round of the UEFA Champions League, for the league champions; it was also assigned two spots in the first qualifying round of the UEFA Cup, for the runners-up and the Luxembourg Cup winners. However, as F91 Dudelange won both the National Division and the Luxembourg Cup (as they had in 2005–06), the UEFA Cup spot for the Luxembourg Cup winners went to the losing finalists, UN Käerjeng 97.

== Pre-season predictions ==
At the beginning of the season, F91 Dudelange were widely predicted to successfully defend their title. Dudelange strengthened their first-team squad by signing Thierry Joly and Alexandre Lecomte, whilst also holding on to most of their existing players. By comparison, Jeunesse Esch and Etzella Ettelbruck, Dudelange's closest challengers in 2005–06, have lost key players; Jeunesse captain Manuel Cardoni became player-manager of US Rumelange, whilst Etzella lost Patrick Grettnich to retirement, and both Luc Mischo and Marc Reuter to Racing FC Union Luxembourg.

== Final standings ==
Pos	Team	Pld	W	D	L	GF	GA	GD	Pts	Qualification or relegation
1	F91 Dudelange (C)	26	21	2	3	71	20	+51	65	Qualification to Champions League first qualifying round
2	Etzella Ettelbruck	26	16	4	6	60	30	+30	52	Qualification to UEFA Cup first qualifying round
3	Differdange 03	26	14	6	6	71	41	+30	48	Qualification to Intertoto Cup first round
4	Racing FC	26	11	8	7	52	35	+17	41	
5	Swift Hesperange	26	11	8	7	40	28	+12	41	
6	Grevenmacher	26	11	8	7	43	34	+9	41	
7	Progrès Niederkorn	26	10	5	11	53	61	−8	35	
8	UN Käerjeng 97	26	10	4	12	32	40	−8	34	Qualification to UEFA Cup first qualifying round
9	Jeunesse Esch	26	9	5	12	29	34	−5	32	
10	Pétange	26	8	8	10	29	38	−9	32	
11	Wiltz 71	26	9	4	13	31	38	−7	31	
12	Victoria Rosport (O)	26	7	6	13	28	47	−19	27	Qualification to Relegation play-offs
13	Mondercange (R)	26	4	6	16	23	59	−36	18	Relegation to Luxembourg Division of Honour
14	Mamer 32 (R)	26	1	6	19	19	71	−52	9	Relegation to Luxembourg Division of Honour

(C) Champions; (O) Play-off winners; (R) Relegated

== Results ==
Home \ Away	DIF	DUD	ETZ	GRE	JEU	KAE	MAM	MON	PÉT	PRO	RAC	SWI	VIC	WIL
Differdange 03		1–2	2–2	2–2	4–1	7–1	5–1	4–0	0–1	4–3	1–1	2–1	3–0	3–0
F91 Dudelange	3–0		4–1	2–1	1–0	3–0	5–1	3–0	4–1	7–2	2–2	2–0	5–0	7–1
Etzella Ettelbruck	5–1	2–0		1–2	2–0	1–2	2–0	2–0	2–1	6–0	2–0	1–0	3–0	3–1
Grevenmacher	2–0	0–0	0–3		2–1	0–2	4–1	0–0	1–0	2–4	4–0	1–1	0–3	0–2
Jeunesse Esch	1–2	0–2	3–3	1–1		2–0	2–1	0–2	2–0	0–3	1–1	0–1	2–0	0–2
UN Käerjeng 97	3–4	2–5	3–1	2–2	2–4		4–0	1–0	0–0	0–2	3–2	3–2	0–0	1–0
Mamer 32	0–8	0–2	0–4	0–2	0–1	0–3		1–1	2–2	2–2	0–3	2–3	1–1	0–0
Mondercange	2–2	1–3	1–3	0–4	1–1	1–3	0–1		1–3	3–1	1–4	0–3	2–0	1–5
Pétange	2–3	0–2	1–1	1–1	1–0	2–2	4–0	1–1		1–0	0–5	2–2	2–1	2–1
Progrès Niederkorn	5–4	1–3	2–4	4–8	0–1	4–0	5–1	2–0	0–0		2–2	2–2	3–2	0–2
Racing FC	1–1	1–0	2–1	0–1	1–3	2–0	1–0	7–2	3–0	1–3		2–2	0–0	3–0
Swift Hesperange	1–1	0–2	1–1	2–2	0–0	2–0	3–2	3–0	0–1	0–1	4–1		2–0	2–0
Victoria Rosport	0–4	3–0 (Note: The F91 Dudelange was forfeited for using an unauthorized player, the original score was three to zero for the latter.)	1–2	2–0	1–0	2–1	3–3	2–3	2–0	2–2	1–6	0–2		1–0
Wiltz 71	1–3	0–2	3–2	0–1	1–3	3–0	1–0	0–0	2–1	4–0	1–1	0–1	1–1	

Legend: Blue = home team win; Yellow = draw; Red = away team win.

== Relegation play-off ==
30 May 2007

Victoria Rosport	2–0	Fola Esch

Stade Alphonse Theis, Hesperange

As a result of their victory, FC Victoria Rosport remained in the National Division for the 2007–08 season.

== Top goalscorers ==
Rank	Player	Club	Goals
1	(Luxembourg) Daniel da Mota	Etzella Ettelbruck	24
2	(France) Pierre Piskor	FC Differdange 03	23
3	(France) Joris di Gregorio	F91 Dudelange	21
4	(Luxembourg) Yannick Bianchini	Racing FC	16
4	(France) Didier Chaillou	Progrès Niedercorn	16
4	(Guinea) Soriba Camara	Progrès Niedercorn	16
7	(Luxembourg) Marcel Christophe	FC Differdange 03	15
8	(Cape Verde) Aldino Medina	Swift Hesperange	14
9	(France) Sergio Pupovac	Racing FC	13
10	(Luxembourg) Sully Bilon	Progrès Niedercorn	12
10	(France) Rudy Marchal	Jeunesse Esch	12
