= Steven Mensah =

Togolese footballer

Personal information
- Full name: Steven Foly Mensah
- Date of birth: 11 February 2003 (age 23)
- Place of birth: Germany
- Height: 1.85 m (6 ft 1 in)
- Position: Goalkeeper

Team information
- Current team: VfB Oldenburg
- Number: 22

Youth career
- 2011–2012: SC V/W Billstedt
- 2012–2020: Hamburger SV

Senior career*
Years	Team	Apps	(Gls)
2020–2024	Hamburger SV II	30	(0)
2025–	VfB Oldenburg	6	(0)

International career^{‡}
2022	Togo U23	2	(0)
2023–	Togo	11	(0)
- * Club domestic league appearances and goals as of 20 June 2026 ‡ National team caps and goals as of 20 June 2026

Steven Foly Mensah (born 11 February 2003) is a professional footballer who plays as a goalkeeper for the German club VfB Oldenburg. Born in Germany, he plays for the Togo national team.

== Club career ==
A youth product of SC V/W Billstedt and Hamburger SV, Mensah started his senior career with Hamburger SV II in the Regionalliga Nord in 2021. In June 2021, he was promoted to Hamburg's senior team. Having left Hamburg in summer 2024, he joined Regionalliga Nord club VfB Oldenburg in January 2025.

== International career ==
Born in Germany, Mensah is Togolese by descent. He was first called up to the Togo national team for a set of matches in March 2022. He trained with the senior squad that window, but made two appearances with the Togo U23 in June 2022. He debuted with Togo in a 2–0 friendly win over Uganda on 14 June 2023.
