= Emmanuel Coquelet =

French footballer (born 1975)

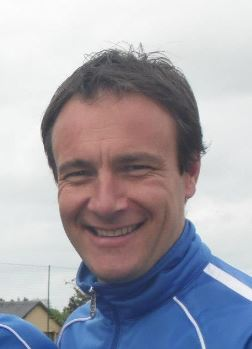

Personal information
- Date of birth: 27 February 1975 (age 51)
- Place of birth: Quarouble, France
- Height: 1.77 m (5 ft 10 in)
- Position: Forward

Senior career*
Years	Team	Apps	(Gls)
1996–1997	Valenciennes		
1997–1998	Lille		
1998–1999	Amiens		
1999–2000	Reims		
2000–2003	Amiens		
2003–2005	Excelsior Virton		
2005	Roeselare		
2006–2007	Mons		
2007	Excelsior Virton		
2007–2009	Dudelange		
- * Club domestic league appearances and goals

Emmanuel Coquelet (born 27 February 1975) is a French former professional footballer who played as a forward. He was voted Luxembourgish Footballer of the Year in 2007–08, also becoming top goalscorer in the same year.
