= Luc Mischo =

Luxembourgish footballer

Personal information
- Full name: Luc Mischo
- Date of birth: 17 September 1974 (age 52)
- Place of birth: Luxembourg
- Height: 1.88 m (6 ft 2 in)
- Position: Striker

Senior career*
Years	Team	Apps	(Gls)
1991–1996	Spora Luxembourg	85	(34)
1996–2000	Aris Bonnevoie	68	(26)
2000–2006	FC Etzella Ettelbruck	126	(52)
2006–2007	Racing FC Luxembourg	15	(2)
Total		294	(114)

International career
2001	Luxembourg	1	(0)
- * Club domestic league appearances and goals

Luc Mischo (born 17 September 1974) is a retired Luxembourgish footballer.

== Club career ==
A prolific striker, Mischo played for Spora Luxembourg, Aris Bonnevoie, FC Etzella Ettelbruck and Racing FC Luxembourg in Luxembourg's domestic National Division in which he scored a total of 114 goals. Mischo played for Etzella Ettelbruck as the club lost the 2003–04 Luxembourg Cup final.

== International career ==
Mischo made his debut for Luxembourg in a June 2001 World Cup qualification match against Slovenia, coming on as a second-half substitute for Daniel Huss. The game proved to be not only his first cap but also his last.

== Honours ==
- Luxembourg Cup: 1

2001
