= Manuel Cardoni =

Luxembourgish footballer (born 1972)

Personal information
- Date of birth: 22 September 1972 (age 54)
- Place of birth: Esch-sur-Alzette, Luxembourg
- Height: 1.84 m (6 ft 0 in)
- Position: Midfielder

Senior career*
Years	Team	Apps	(Gls)
1990–1992	US Rumelange		
1992–1996	Jeunesse Esch	93	(30)
1996–1998	Bayer Leverkusen	1	(0)
1998–2006	Jeunesse Esch	166	(30)
2006–2008	US Rumelange		
Total		260	(60)

International career
1993–2004	Luxembourg	69	(5)

Managerial career
- 2008–2010: US Rumelange (assistant manager)
- 2010–2012: US Rumelange
- 2014–: Luxembourg U21
- 2014–2021: Luxembourg U19
- * Club domestic league appearances and goals

Manuel Cardoni (born 22 September 1972) is a Luxembourgish former professional football player. He is the technical director at Luxembourg national team.

Cardoni is the son of Furio Cardoni, one of Luxembourg's finest players in the 1970s.

== Club career ==
A tireless midfield playmaker, Cardoni started his career at US Rumelange before joining Luxembourg club Jeunesse Esch in 1992. He was then snapped up by Bundesliga side Bayer Leverkusen, for whom he made only one substitute appearance (against Bayern Munich) in two seasons. He became the third Luxembourgish player in the Bundesliga ever, after Nico Braun and Robby Langers.

He rejoined Jeunesse Esch in 1998 and became player-manager at US Rumelange in 2006.

Cardoni won the Luxembourgish Footballer of the Year award four times (1995, 1996, 1999, 2000). He now serves as an ambassador for the Special Olympics.

== International career ==
Cardoni made his debut for Luxembourg national team in a May 1993 World Cup qualification match against Iceland and went on to earn 68 caps, scoring 5 goals. He played in 22 World Cup qualification matches.

His final international game was an October 2004 World Cup qualification match against Liechtenstein.

== Career statistics ==
#	Date	Venue	Opponent	Score	Result	Competition
1.	22 February 1995	National Stadium, Ta' Qali, Malta	Malta	1–0	1–0	UEFA Euro 1996 qualifying
2.	13 March 1996	Stade Josy Barthel, Luxembourg City, Luxembourg	Switzerland	1–0	1–1	Friendly match
3.	23 February 2000	Stade Josy Barthel, Luxembourg City, Luxembourg	Northern Ireland	1–1	1–3	Friendly match
4.	17 April 2002	Stade Alphonse Theis, Hesperange, Luxembourg	Liechtenstein	3–3	3–3	Friendly match
5.	8 September 2004	Stade Josy Barthel, Luxembourg City, Luxembourg	Latvia	3–2	3–4	2006 FIFA World Cup qualification

== Honours ==
- Luxembourg National Division: 1995, 1996, 1999, 2004
- Luxembourg Cup: 1999, 2000
- Luxembourgish Footballer of the Year: 1995, 1996, 1999, 2000
