= Luc Holtz =

Luxembourgish footballer (born 1969)

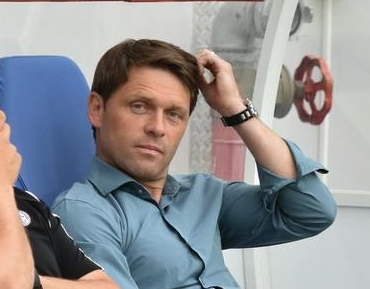
- Holtz in 2015

Personal information
- Birth name: Luc Aloyse Yvon Holtz
- Date of birth: 14 June 1969 (age 57)
- Place of birth: Ettelbruck, Luxembourg
- Height: 1.76 m (5 ft 9 1/2 in)
- Position: Midfielder

Youth career
- Montceau-les-Mines

Senior career*
Years	Team	Apps	(Gls)
1990–1992	Red Boys Differdange	56	(25)
1992–1999	Avenir Beggen	154	(61)
1999–2008	Etzella Ettelbruck	134	(25)
Total		344	(111)

International career
1991–2002	Luxembourg	55	(1)

Managerial career
- 1999–2008: Etzella Ettelbruck
- 2008–2010: Luxembourg U21
- 2010–2025: Luxembourg
- 2025–2026: SV Waldhof Mannheim
- 2026: Metz
- * Club domestic league appearances and goals

Luc Aloyse Yvon Holtz (born 14 June 1969) is a Luxembourgish professional football manager and former international player. He was most recently the manager of Ligue 2 club Metz. He previously coached the Luxembourg national football team from 2010 to 2025, having played for the team from 1991 to 2002.

== Club career ==
A central midfield playmaker, Holtz started his career at Red Boys Differdange before joining Avenir Beggen for the 1992–93 season. With Avenir Beggen he immediately won two successive league and cup doubles and he himself claimed the 1993 Luxembourgish Footballer of the Year award.

In 1999, he left them to become player/manager at Etzella Ettelbruck. With Etzella, he immediately won promotion to the Luxembourg National Division in his first season in charge. Also, he brought them their first major silverware by winning the cup in 2001. After relegation in 2002, they got promoted again at the first attempt. In 2003 and 2004 they lost two successive cup finals.

Holtz retired as a player at the end of the 2007–08 season.

== International career ==
Holtz made his debut for Luxembourg in an October 1991 friendly match against Portugal, which surprisingly ended in a 1–1 draw. He went on to earn 55 caps, scoring one goal. He played in 15 FIFA World Cup qualification matches.

He played his final international game in October 2002, a 0–7 loss against Romania.

== Controversies and resignation ==
Holtz was embroiled in controversy in June 2025 after allowing Gerson Rodrigues to continue representing the Luxembourg national football team after his conviction for assault and battery, including one for domestic violence against his ex-partner. Despite Rodrigues receiving only a fine and a suspended sentence, Holtz stated that "everyone may express their view" and that he did not "feel called to judge". Holtz responded to negative coverage from Le Quotidien's Julien Mollereau by excluding him from a press event, which drew accusations of violating press freedom. Rodrigues' inclusion drew criticism from women's groups and politicians, including Corinne Cahen.

Following the controversy, on 9 July 2025, the FLF announced that Holtz's contract as manager would not be renewed, and would come to an end on 31 December 2025. On 11 August, the federation announced that Holtz had resigned 'with immediate effect', leading to the end of his 15-year stint as manager of the national team. At the time of his resignation, Holtz was the second-longest serving manager of a FIFA national team, behind Andorra's Koldo Álvarez.

== Managerial career ==
It was reported that Holtz was due to become the manager of 3. Liga side SV Waldhof Mannheim. He was announced as the club's manager on 12 August 2025. He left Mannheim after one year and moved to Metz in June 2026 where he stayed for 3 months before parting ways in September.

== Personal life ==
Holtz's son, Kevin, is also a Luxembourg international footballer, making his debut under Luc.

== International goals ==
Scores and results list Luxembourg's goal tally first.

#	Date	Venue	Opponent	Score	Result	Competition
1.	6 September 1995	Stade Josy Barthel, Luxembourg (city), Luxembourg	Malta	1–0	1–0	Euro 1996 qualifier

== Honours ==
- Luxembourg National Division: 2

1993, 1994

- Luxembourg Cup: 3

1993, 1994, 2001

- Luxembourgish Footballer of the Year: 1

1993

== Managerial statistics ==
As of match played 19 September 2026

Team	From	To	Record				
Team	From	To	G	W	D	L	Win %
Etzella Ettelbruck	1999	2008	294	166	42	86	56.46
Luxembourg U21	2008	2010	10	2	1	7	20.00
Luxembourg	2010	2025	144	33	29	82	22.92
SV Waldhof Mannheim	2025	2026	36	15	6	15	41.67
Metz	2026	2026	7	2	4	1	28.57
Total			491	218	82	191	44.40
