= FC Titus Lamadelaine =

Defunct association football club in Luxembourg

- Full name: FC Titus Lamadelaine
- Founded: 1948
- Dissolved: 29 April 2015

FC Titus Lamadelaine is a former football club, based in Luxembourg. In 2015 it folded as it merged with CS Pétange to form Union Titus Pétange.
