= Stade Municipal, Schifflange =

Football stadium in Schifflange, Luxembourg

Stade Municipal
- Interactive map of Stade Municipal
- Full name: Stade Municipal
- Location: Schifflange, Luxembourg
- Coordinates: 49.5111°N 6.0154°E
- Capacity: 3,500
- Surface: grass

Tenant
- FC Schifflange 95

Stade Municipal is a football stadium in Schifflange, in south-western Luxembourg and is currently the home stadium of FC Schifflange 95. The stadium has a capacity of 3,500.

It is also known as the Stade Rue Denis Netgen.
