= Daniel da Mota =

Luxembourgish-Portuguese football winger

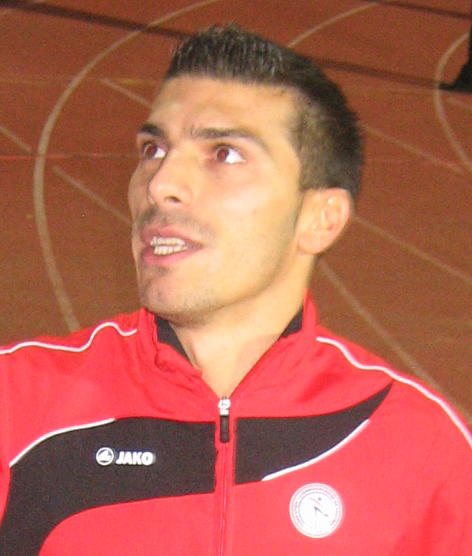
- Daniel da Mota in 2010

Personal information
- Full name: Daniel da Mota Alves
- Date of birth: 11 September 1985 (age 41)
- Place of birth: Ettelbrück, Luxembourg
- Height: 1.77 m (5 ft 10 in)
- Position: Left winger

Team information
- Current team: Atert Bissen
- Number: 9

Youth career
- FC Etzella Ettelbruck

Senior career*
Years	Team	Apps	(Gls)
2001–2008	Etzella Ettelbruck	133	(77)
2008–2017	F91 Dudelange	201	(64)
2017–2020	Racing FC	59	(13)
2020–2021	Calvina	0	(0)
2021–2022	Differdange 03	25	(1)
2022–2023	Etzella Ettelbruck	27	(2)
2023–	Atert Bissen	45	(8)

International career^{‡}
2007–2021	Luxembourg	101	(7)
- * Club domestic league appearances and goals as of 6 June 2026 ‡ National team caps and goals as of 6 June 2021

Daniel da Mota Alves (born 11 September 1985) is a Luxembourgish footballer who plays for Atert Bissen.

== Club career ==
Da Mota finished the 2005–06 season of the Luxembourg National Division as the joint-sixth top goalscorer, and the second-best placed Luxembourgish footballer.

The following season, da Mota scored 24 goals (fully 40% of all of second-placed Ettelbruck's goals), finishing as the league's top goalscorer. In July 2008, he left FC Etzella Ettelbruck and moved for 65,000 Euro to F91 Dudelange.

== International career ==
Born in Luxembourg to Portuguese parents, Da Mota took up Luxembourgish citizenship in January 2007 and made his debut for Luxembourg in a June 2007 European Championship qualification match against Albania. His first two international goals helped Luxembourg defeat Slovakia by a score of 2–1 on 9 February 2011. He scored his second international goal on 7 September 2012 in a World Cup qualifier against Portugal in a 2–1 defeat. On 2 June 2021, he played his 100th match for Luxembourg in a friendly match against Norway.

== Criminal Conviction ==
Daniel da Mota was prosecuted for having taken advantage of the weakened state of an octogenarian. The court sentenced him to two years in prison with a suspended sentence and a fine of 5,000 euros. He has the obligation to compensate the civil party up to 150,500 euros.

== Honours ==
F91 Dudelange

- Luxembourg National Division (6): 2008–09, 2010–11, 2011–12, 2013–14, 2015–16, 2016–17
- Luxembourg Cup (4): 2008–09, 2011–12, 2015–16, 2016–17

Individual

- Luxembourg National Division top scorer: 2006–07
- Luxembourgish Footballer of the Year: 2010–11

== See also ==
- List of men's footballers with 100 or more international caps
