= List of football clubs in Luxembourg =

This is a complete list of football clubs in Luxembourg affiliated to the Luxembourg Football Federation, the governing body for football in Luxembourg.

== A ==
Club	Town	Canton	Stadium	2026–27 Division
Les Aiglons Dalheim	Dalheim	Remich	Terrain Kierlingerstrooss	2. Division Series 2
Alisontia Steinsel	Steinsel	Luxembourg	Stade Henri Bausch	1. Division Series 1 ▼
Alliance Äischdall	Hobscheid	Capellen	Stade Koericherberg	2. Division Series 2 ▼
Les Ardoisiers Perlé	Perlé	Redange	Terrain Centre Culturel	3. Division
Atert Bissen	Bissen	Mersch	Terrain Bousbierg	National Division
Avenir Beggen	Beggen	Luxembourg	Stade rue Henri Dunant	Division of Honour ▲

== B ==
Club	Town	Canton	Stadium	2026–27 Division
Bastendorf 47	Bastendorf	Vianden	Stade Millewiss	2. Division Series 1 ▼
The Belval Belvaux	Belvaux	Esch-sur-Alzette	Stade FC The Belval	Division of Honour
Berdenia Berbourg	Berbourg	Grevenmacher	Stade Renert	Division of Honour
Berdorf-Consdorf	Consdorf	Echternach	Stade Kuerzwénkel	2. Division Series 2 ↔
SC Bettembourg	Bettembourg	Esch-sur-Alzette	Stade Municipal (Bettembourg)	Division of Honour
SC Bettembourg Féminine	Bettembourg	Esch-sur-Alzette	Terrain 1, Bettembourg	Dames Ligue 1
Biekerech	Beckerich	Redange	Stade Maemerich	2. Division Series 2 ▲
Blo Waiss Itzig	Itzig	Luxembourg	Stade Albert Kongs	1. Division Series 2
Blo-Wäiss Medernach	Medernach	Diekirch	Stade Am Weiher	1. Division Series 1
Boevange-Attert	Boevange	Clervaux	Stade Am Letschert	2. Division Series 1
Bourscheid	Michelau	Diekirch	Terrain In Der Ae	2. Division Series 1
Brouch	Brouch	Mersch	Stade Feidt Frères	3. Division

== C ==
Club	Town	Canton	Stadium	2026–27 Division
Claravallis Clervaux	Clervaux	Clervaux	Stade Aloyse Meyer	3. Division ▼
ES Clemency	Clemency	Capellen	Terrain rue de la Gare	2. Division Series 2
Colmarberg	Colmar-Berg	Mersch	Stade Grand Duc Henri	3. Division

== D ==
Club	Town	Canton	Stadium	2026–27 Division
Daring Echternach	Echternach	Echternach	Stade Breil	1. Division Series 2
Differdange 03	Differdange	Esch-sur-Alzette	Stade Municipal (Differdange)	National Division
F91 Dudelange	Dudelange	Esch-sur-Alzette	Stade Jos Nosbaum	National Division

== E ==
Club	Town	Canton	Stadium	2026–27 Division
Ehlerange	Ehlerange	Esch-sur-Alzette	Stade F. Schuman	2. Division Series 2
SC Ell	Ell	Redange	Terrain Um Essig	2. Division Series 1
Etzella Ettelbruck	Ettelbruck	Diekirch	Stade Am Deich	National Division ▲
72 Erpeldange	Erpeldange	Diekirch	Stade An Der Trell	1. Division Series 1 ▲
US Esch	Esch-sur-Alzette	Esch-sur-Alzette	Stade Lankhelz	3. Division ▼
Excelsior Grevels	Grevels	Redange	Terrain rue de Kuborn	3. Division

== F ==
Club	Town	Canton	Stadium	2026–27 Division
Feulen	Niederfeulen	Diekirch	Terrain In Bertzent	Division of Honour
Fola Esch	Esch-sur-Alzette	Esch-sur-Alzette	Stade Émile Mayrisch	Division of Honour
Folschette	Folschette	Redange	Centre Culturel et Sportif	1. Division Series 1 ▲

== G ==
Club	Town	Canton	Stadium	2026–27 Division
Green Boys	Harlange	Wiltz	Stade Am Duerf	1. Division Series 1 ▲
Grevenmacher	Grevenmacher	Grevenmacher	Op Flohr Stadion	1. Division Series 2

== H ==
Club	Town	Canton	Stadium	2026–27 Division
Hosingen	Hosingen	Clervaux	Stade Op Der Hei	1. Division Series 1
Hostert	Hostert	Luxembourg	Stade Jos Becker	National Division

== J ==
Club	Town	Canton	Stadium	2026–27 Division
Jeunesse Biwer	Biwer	Grevenmacher	Centre Sportif Fancy	1. Division Series 2 ▲
Jeunesse Canach	Canach	Remich	Stade Rue de Lenningen	Division of Honour ▼
Jeunesse Esch	Esch-sur-Alzette	Esch-sur-Alzette	Stade de la Frontière	National Division
Jeunesse Gilsdorf	Gilsdorf	Diekirch	Stade Um Krottepull	1. Division Series 1
Jeunesse Junglinster	Junglinster	Grevenmacher	Terrain Route de Luxembourg	2. Division Series 2 ▼
Jeunesse Schieren	Schieren	Diekirch	Terrain Am Ge'er	1. Division Series 1
Jeunesse Useldange	Useldange	Redange	Stade Rue de Boevange	1. Division Series 1

== K ==
Club	Town	Canton	Stadium	2026–27 Division
Käerch	Koerich	Capellen	Stade Déckebierg	1. Division Series 1
UN Käerjéng 97	Bascharage	Capellen	Stade um Bëchel	National Division
Kehlen	Kehlen	Capellen	Stade Albert Berchem	1. Division Series 2 ↔
Kiischpelt Wilwerwiltz	Pintsch	Wiltz	Terrain Pintsch	2. Division Series 1 ▲
Koeppchen Wormeldange	Wormeldange	Grevenmacher	Stade Am Ga	Division of Honour
Kopstal 33	Kopstal	Capellen	Terrain rue de Mersch	1. Division Series 2

== L ==
Club	Town	Canton	Stadium	2026–27 Division
Lorentzweiler	Lorentzweiler	Mersch	Terrain rue de Hunsdorf	Division of Honour
Luna Oberkorn	Oberkorn	Esch-sur-Alzette	Stade Jaminet	3. Division
FC Luxembourg City	Luxembourg	Luxembourg	Stade Luxembourg Cents	Division of Honour

== M ==
Club	Town	Canton	Stadium	2026–27 Division
Mamer 32	Mamer	Capellen	Stade François Trausch	Division of Honour ▼
Marisca Mersch	Mersch	Mersch	Stade Schintgespesch	Division of Honour
Union Mertert-Wasserbillig	Wasserbillig	Grevenmacher	Stade de la Sûre	1. Division Series 2
Minerva Lintgen	Lintgen	Mersch	Stade Jean Donnersbach	1. Division Series 1
Minière Lasauvage	Lasauvage	Esch-sur-Alzette	Stade des Mineurs	2. Division Series 2
Mondercange	Mondercange	Esch-sur-Alzette	Stade Communal	Division of Honour
Mondorf-les-Bains	Mondorf-les-Bains	Remich	Stade John Grün	National Division
Moutfort-Medingen	Moutfort	Luxembourg	Terrain Am Brill	1. Division Series 2 ▲
Munsbach	Munsbach	Luxembourg	Terrain Munsbach	1. Division Series 2

== N ==
Club	Town	Canton	Stadium	2026–27 Division
Noertzange HF	Noertzange	Esch-sur-Alzette	Terrain rue de L'Ecole	3. Division ▼
Norden 02	Weiswampach	Clervaux	Stade Auf dem Kiemel	1. Division Series 1

== O ==
Club	Town	Canton	Stadium	2026–27 Division
CS Oberkorn	Oberkorn	Esch-sur-Alzette	Stade Municipal (Oberkorn)	2. Division Series 2 ▼
Olympia Christnach-Waldbillig	Christnach	Echternach	Terrain Am Lahr	1. Division Series 1 ▲
Orania Vianden	Vianden	Vianden	Stade Am Komp	2. Division Series 1

== P ==
Club	Town	Canton	Stadium	2026–27 Division
Pratzerthal-Redange	Redange	Redange	Stade Emile Schlesser	2. Division Series 1
Progrès Niederkorn	Niederkorn	Esch-sur-Alzette	Stade Jos Haupert	National Division

== R ==
Club	Town	Canton	Stadium	2026–27 Division
Racing Union	Luxembourg	Luxembourg	Stade Achille Hammerel	National Division
Racing Heiderscheid-Eschdorf	Eschdorf	Wiltz	Stade Um Quatre-Vents	2. Division Series 1
Racing Troisvierges	Troisvierges	Clervaux	Stade Op der Kopp	2. Division Series 1
Rambrouch	Rambrouch	Redange	Terrain Rambrouch	2. Division Series 1
AS Red Black Luxembourg	Luxembourg	Luxembourg	Stade Gaston Diderich	1. Division Series 2 ▲
Red Boys Aspelt	Aspelt	Esch-sur-Alzette	Stade de la Frontière	2. Division Series 2
Red Star Merl-Belair	Merl	Luxembourg	Stade Prince Jean	1. Division Series 2
Reisdorf	Reisdorf	Diekirch	Terrain An der Ee	2. Division Series 1 ▲
Résidence Walferdange	Walferdange	Luxembourg	Stade Prince Henri	National Division ▲
Rodange 91	Rodange	Esch-sur-Alzette	Stade Joseph Philippart	Division of Honour ▼
Rumelange	Rumelange	Esch-sur-Alzette	Stade Municipal (Rumelange)	National Division ▲
Rupensia Lusitanos Larochette	Larochette	Mersch	Terrain Op Birkelt	2. Division Series 1 ▼

== S ==
Club	Town	Canton	Stadium	2026–27 Division
Sandweiler	Sandweiler	Luxembourg	Stade Norbert Hübsch	2. Division Series 2 ▼
Sanem	Sanem	Esch-sur-Alzette	Stade CS Sanem	1. Division Series 2
Schengen	Remerschen	Remich	Terrain FC Schengen	1. Division Series 2
Schifflange 95	Schifflange	Esch-sur-Alzette	Stade Rue Denis Netgen	1. Division Series 2 ▼
Schouweiler	Schouweiler	Capellen	Stade Roger Winandy	2. Division Series 2
Sporting Bertrange	Bertrange	Luxembourg	Plaine des Jeux André Wolff	1. Division Series 2
Sporting Mertzig	Mertzig	Diekirch	Terrain an den Burwiesen	1. Division Series 1
Steinfort	Steinfort	Capellen	Stade Demy Steichen	2. Division Series 2
Swift Hesperange	Hesperange	Luxembourg	Stade Alphonse Theis	National Division
Syra Mensdorf	Mensdorf	Grevenmacher	Stade Op Biirk	1. Division Series 2

== T ==
Club	Town	Canton	Stadium	2026–27 Division
Tricolore Gasperich	Luxembourg	Luxembourg	Stade Emile Bintner	2. Division Series 2

== U ==
Club	Town	Canton	Stadium	2026–27 Division
Union Kayl-Tétange	Tétange	Esch-sur-Alzette	Stade Victor Marchal	2. Division Series 2
URB	Remich	Remich	Stade Op der Millen	Division of Honour ▲
Union Titus Pétange	Pétange	Esch-sur-Alzette	Stade Municipal (Pétange)	Division of Honour ▼
UNA Strassen	Strassen	Luxembourg	Stade An de Millewisen	National Division

== V ==
Club	Town	Canton	Stadium	2026–27 Division
Victoria Rosport	Rosport	Echternach	VictoriArena	National Division

== W ==
Club	Town	Canton	Stadium	2026–27 Division
Wiltz 71	Wiltz	Wiltz	Stade Am Pëtz	National Division ▲
Wincrange	Wincrange	Clervaux	Stade Henri Lamborelle	2. Division Series 1 ▼

== Y ==
Club	Town	Canton	Stadium	2026–27 Division
Yellow Boys Weiler-la-Tour	Weiler-la-Tour	Luxembourg	Stade Am Dieltchen	1. Division Series 2
Young Boys Diekirch	Diekirch	Diekirch	Stade Municipal (Diekirch)	1. Division Series 1

== Defunct clubs ==
Club	Town	Canton	Stadium	Status
Alliance Dudelange	Dudelange	Esch-sur-Alzette	-	Part of F91 Dudelange since 1991
Aris Bonnevoie	Bonnevoie (Luxembourg City)	Luxembourg	Stade Achille Hammerel	Part of Racing Union since 2005
AS Differdange	Differdange	Esch-sur-Alzette	-	Merged into Differdange 03 in 2003
AS Luxembourg	Luxembourg	Luxembourg	Stade Boy Konen	Merged into AS Red Black Luxembourg in 2025
Blue Boys Muhlenbach	Muhlenbach	Luxembourg	Stade Mathias Mamer	Merged with RM Hamm Benfica in 2020
CeBra 01	Cessange (Luxembourg City)	Luxembourg	Complexe Sportif Boy Konen	Merged with FC Luxembourg City in 2023
CS Alliance 01	Luxembourg	Luxembourg	-	Merged into Racing Union in 2005
CS Hobscheid	Hobscheid	Capellen	Stade Koericherberg	Part of FC Alliance Äischdall since 2007
CS Muhlenbach Lusitanos	Muhlenbach	Luxembourg	-	Rebranded as FC Blue Boys Muhlenbach in 2012
CS Pétange	Pétange	Esch-sur-Alzette	Stade Municipal (Pétange)	Part of Union Titus Pétange since 2015
Flaxweiler-Beyren	-	-	-	Defunct since 2012
Jeunesse Hautcharage	Bascharage	Capellen	-	Part of UN Käerjéng 97 since 1997
Racing Club Luxembourg	Luxembourg	Luxembourg	-	Now part of Racing Union
Red Black Egalité	Luxembourg	Luxembourg	Stade Gaston Diderich	Merged into AS Red Black Luxembourg in 2025
Red Boys Differdange	Differdange	Esch-sur-Alzette	Stade du Thillenberg	Part of Differdange 03 since 2003
RM Hamm Benfica	Luxembourg	Luxembourg	-	Rebranded as FC Luxembourg City in 2022
SC Luxembourg	Luxembourg	Luxembourg	-	Now part of Racing Union
Simmern Iska Boys	-	-	-	Defunct since 2011
Spora Luxembourg	Luxembourg	Luxembourg	Stade Josy Barthel	Part of Racing Union since 2005
Stade Dudelange	Dudelange	Esch-sur-Alzette	Stade Aloyse Meyer	Part of F91 Dudelange since 1991
Titus Lamadelaine	Pétange	Esch-sur-Alzette	-	Part of Union Titus Pétange since 2015
Union Luxembourg	Luxembourg	Luxembourg	Stade Achille Hammerel	Part of Racing Union since 2005
US Dudelange	Dudelange	Esch-sur-Alzette	-	Part of F91 Dudelange since 1991
US Hollerich Bonnevoie	Bonnevoie	Luxembourg	-	Now part of Racing Union
Vinesca Ehnen	Ehnen	Grevenmacher	Terrain Im Gau	-
