= Pierre Piskor =

French footballer (born 1984)

Personal information
- Full name: Pierre Olivier Piskor
- Date of birth: 2 May 1984 (age 42)
- Place of birth: France
- Position: Forward

Senior career*
Years	Team	Apps	(Gls)
- US Batilly
2005–2006	Rodange 91		
2006–2013	Differdange 03	90	(73)
2013–2014	Jeunesse Esch		
2015–2016	Differdange 03		
- * Club domestic league appearances and goals

Pierre Olivier Piskor (born 2 May 1984) is a French former footballer who played as a forward in the Luxembourg National Division.

He won the Luxembourgish Footballer of the Year at the end of the 2008–09 season, having scored 30 goals in 26 games for Differdange in the season.

== Club career ==
Piskor was virtually unknown until the summer of 2006, when he moved from Third Division Rodange 91 to Differdange. In his first season, he finished the 2006–07 season of the National Division as the league's second-top goalscorer behind Daniel Da Mota, scoring 25 goals including five goals in an 8–0 win against FC Mamer 32.

The following season, he topped the National Division goal-scoring charts, totalling 30 goals in 26 games, and winning the Luxembourgish Footballer of the Year award: the first time a non-F91 Dudelange player had won in five years. Qualifying for the UEFA Europa League 2nd Qualifying round in 2009–10, Piskor scored Differdange's sole goal against NK Rijeka of Croatia. However, the following season, Piskor failed to follow up this goalscoring record, scoring eight goals in nineteen games.

== Style of play ==
A right-footed forward, Piskor was good in the penalty area and contributed little defensively.

== Honours ==
- Luxembourgish Footballer of the Year: 2008–09
- Luxembourg National Division top scorer: 2008–09 (30 goals)
- Luxembourg Cup: 2008–09
