= Stade Municipal, Pétange =

Football stadium in Pétange, Luxembourg

Stade Municipal
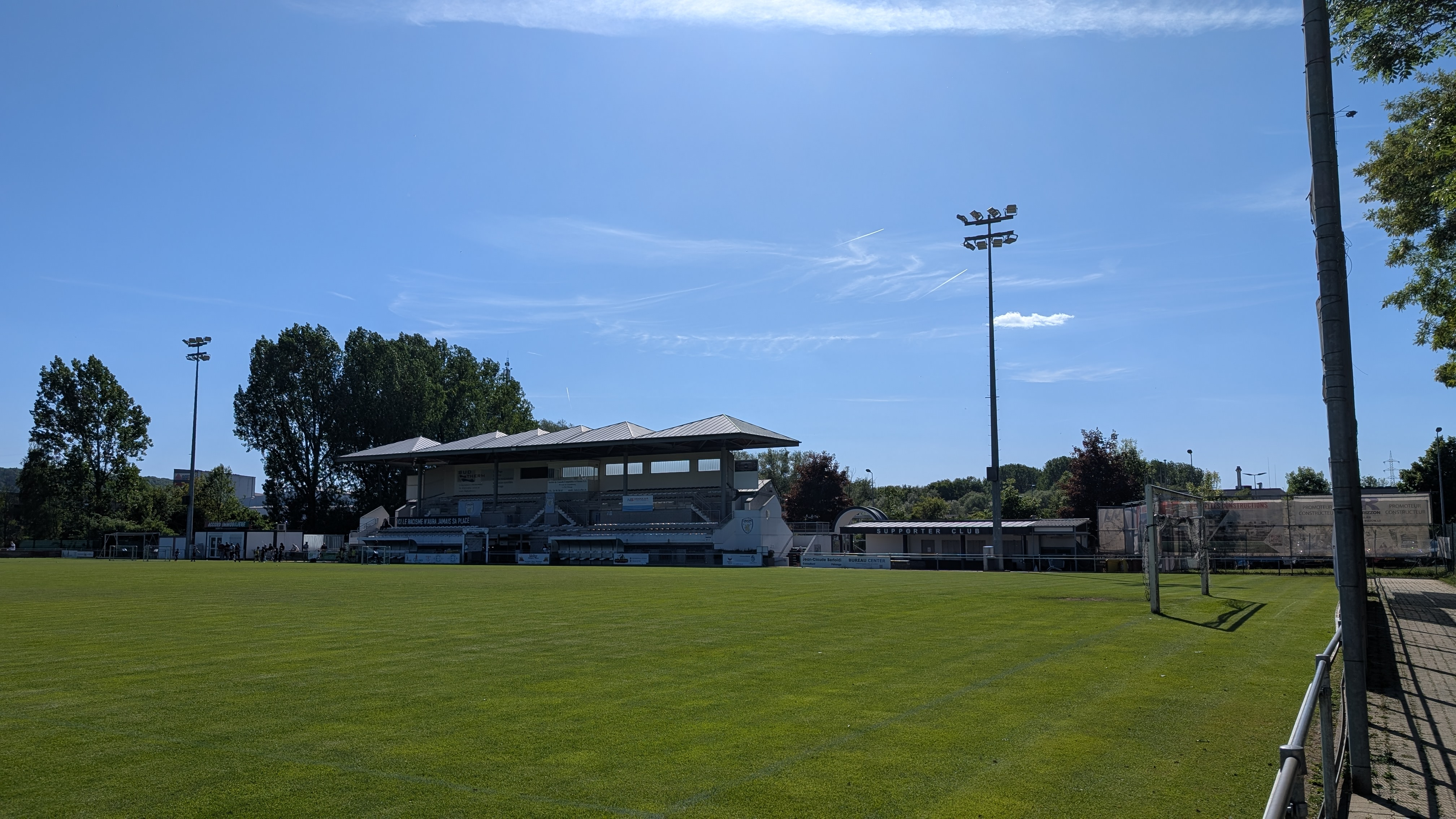
- Stade Municipal main stand
- Interactive map of Stade Municipal
- Full name: Stade Municipal
- Location: Pétange, Luxembourg
- Coordinates: 49.5572°N 5.8565°E
- Capacity: 2,400
- Surface: grass

Tenant
- Union Titus Pétange

Stade Municipal is a football stadium in Pétange, in south-western Luxembourg. It is currently the home stadium of Union Titus Pétange. The stadium has a capacity of 2,400.
