= Sergio Pupovac =

French-born Luxembourgish footballer (born 1979)

Personal information
- Full name: Sergio Pupovac
- Date of birth: 5 July 1979 (age 47)
- Place of birth: Argenteuil, France
- Height: 1.82 m (5 ft 11 1/2 in)
- Position: Striker

Senior career*
Years	Team	Apps	(Gls)
- Levallois SC
- FC Rodange 91
2004–2005	CS Alliance 01	28	(24)
2005–2009	RFC Union Luxembourg	86	(46)
2009–2011	Jeunesse Esch	41	(14)
2011–2013	FC UNA Strassen		

International career
2009	Luxembourg	5	(0)
- * Club domestic league appearances and goals

Sergio Pupovac (born 5 July 1979), also known as Serdo or Serdjio Pupovac, is a retired French-born Luxembourgish footballer who played as a striker.

== Club career ==
Pupovac started his career at French fifth division side Levallois SC before moving to Luxembourg.

He topped the Luxembourg National Division goalscoring table, with 24 goals for Racing FC's predecessor club, CS Alliance 01, in 2004-05.

In 2009 he has played 5 matches for the Luxembourg national football team.
