= Stéphane Martine =

French Guianese footballer (born 1978)

Personal information
- Date of birth: 5 March 1978 (age 48)
- Place of birth: Saint-Laurent-du-Maroni, French Guiana
- Height: 1.68 m (5 ft 6 in)
- Position: Striker

Youth career
- 1995–1997: CS Sedan

Senior career*
Years	Team	Apps	(Gls)
1997–1998	Sedan		
1998–2001	Virton		
2001–2002	Charleroi	11	(2)
2002–2007	F91 Dudelange	78	(46)
2007–2010	Racing FC Luxembourg	48	(19)

International career
- French Guiana
- * Club domestic league appearances and goals

Stéphane Martine (born 5 March 1978) is a French Guianese former professional footballer who played as a striker.

== Club career ==
Martine played in Luxembourg for Racing FC Union Luxembourg, having previously played for F91 Dudelange.

== International career ==
He was born in French Guiana, and represents the région's national team at international level.

== Honours ==
F91 Dudelange

- Luxembourg National Division: 2005, 2006, 2007
- Luxembourg Cup: 2004, 2006, 2007

Individual

- Luxembourgish Footballer of the Year: 2005
