= Daniel Huss =

Luxembourgish footballer (born 1979)

Personal information
- Date of birth: 4 October 1979 (age 47)
- Place of birth: Luxembourg City, Luxembourg
- Height: 1.82 m (6 ft 0 in)
- Position: Striker

Youth career
- 1997: CS Grevenmacher

Senior career*
Years	Team	Apps	(Gls)
1997	Standard Liège	0	(0)
1998	1. FC Kaiserslautern II	0	(0)
1998–2014	CS Grevenmacher	251	(151)

International career
2000–2007	Luxembourg	46	(2)
- * Club domestic league appearances and goals

Daniel Huss (born 4 October 1979) is a Luxembourgish footballer who played as a striker for CS Grevenmacher in Luxembourg's domestic National Division until 2014.

== Club career ==
Huss came through the youth ranks at local side CS Grevenmacher and joined Belgians Standard Liège at 17 years of age only to leave them for the reserves of 1. FC Kaiserslautern after only half a season. He rejoined Grevenmacher the next season to start a longer-lasting and prolific career with them. He was club captain when he won their first ever league title with Grevenmacher in 2003 and made it a league and cup double by scoring the winning goal in the 1-0 cup final defeat of Etzella Ettelbruck. Also, he became the league's top goalscorer that year by scoring 22 goals.

He also scored a goal in the 2008 cup final, a 4–1 defeat of Victoria Rosport.

== International career ==
Huss made his debut for Luxembourg in a February 2000 friendly match against Northern Ireland, coming on as a late substitute for Luc Holtz. He went on to earn 46 caps, scoring 2 goals. He played in 12 World Cup qualification matches.

== Honours ==
CS Grevenmacher

- Luxembourg National Division: 2003
- Luxembourg Cup: 2003, 2008
