= CS Pétange =

Defunct association football club in Luxembourg

- Full name: Club Sportif Pétange
- Founded: 1910
- Dissolved: 2015
- Ground: Stade Municipal, Pétange
- Capacity: 2,400
- 2014–15: Division of Honour, 7th of 14
Home colours	Away colours

Club Sportif Pétange was a football club from Pétange in south-western Luxembourg. In 2015 it merged with FC Titus Lamadelaine to form Union Titus Pétange.

== History ==
In the 2007–08 season, Pétange finished fourteenth and last in the National Division and were relegated to the Division of Honour. In 2008/09 the club finished top of the Luxembourg Division of Honour and immediately returned to the National Division. They, however, were again relegated at the end of the 2012–13 season. This was their sixth relegation from the top tier in just over 25 years.

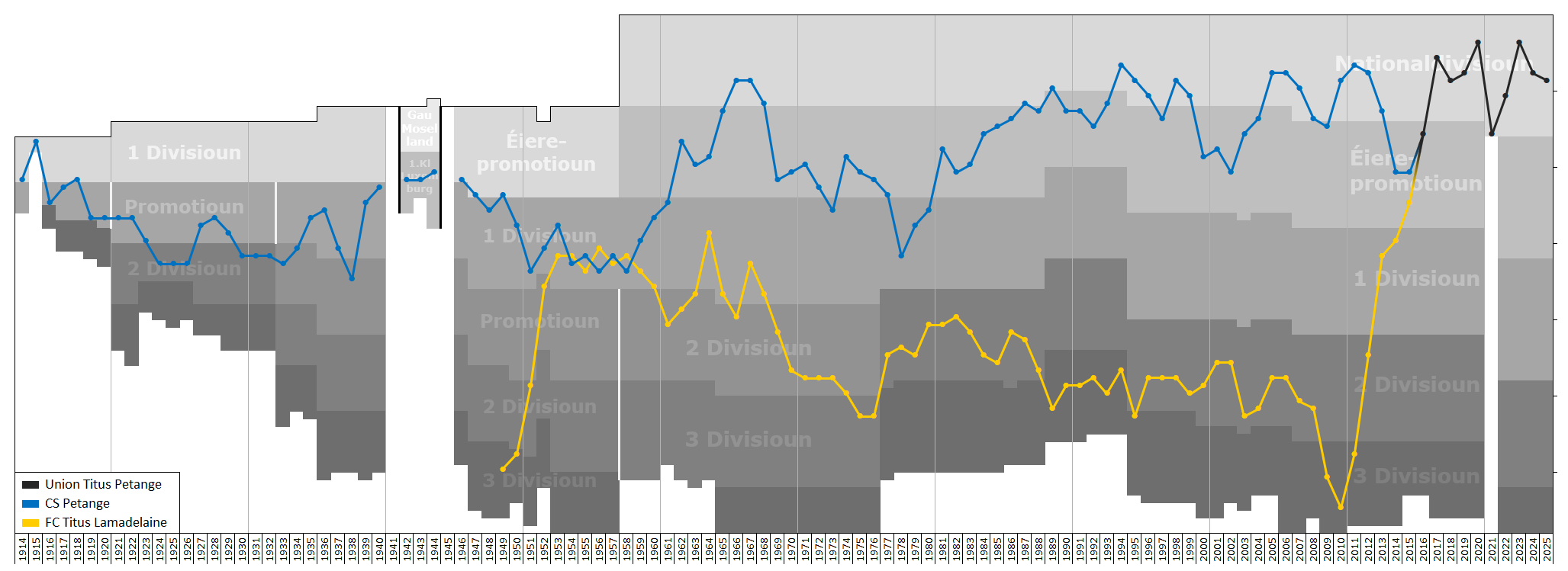
Historical league performance chart of Union Titus Pétange and its predecessors, including CS Petange

Pétange have reached the final of the Luxembourg Cup on two occasions, losing to Avenir Beggen in 1991–92, before beating FC CeBra 01 in 2004–05 to win their only title.

== Honours ==
- Luxembourg Cup
  - Winners (1): 2004–05
  - Runners-up (1): 1991–92

== European Competition ==
Pétange have qualified for European competition once, in the 2005–06 UEFA Cup Qualification round where, despite a respectable 1–1 draw at home in the second leg, they were eliminated 4–1 on aggregate.

Competition	P	W	D	L	F	A
UEFA Cup	2	0	1	1	1	4

Season	Competition	Round	Opponent	1st Leg	2nd Leg	Agg
2005–06 UEFA Cup		Q1	(Finland) AC Allianssi	0–3 (A)	1–1 (A)	1–4

== Managers ==
- (France) Manuel Peixoto (July 2004 – July 2007)
- (Albania) Florim Alijaj (Sept 2007 – June 2008)
- (Luxembourg) Carlo Weis (July 2008 – Nov 2011)
- (France) Michel Leflochmoan (Nov 2011 – June 2012)
- (Belgium) Michel Renquin (Jan 2012 – Aug 2012)
- (Portugal) Paulo Gomes (Oct 2012–)
