= FC Etzella Ettelbruck =

Association football club in Luxembourg

Etzella
- Full name: Foussballclub Etzella Ettelbruck
- Founded: 21 May 1917; 109 years ago
- Ground: Stade Am Deich, Ettelbruck
- Capacity: 2,020
- Chairman: Tun DiBari
- Manager: Josef Çınar
- League: National Division
- 2025–26: Division of Honour, 2nd of 16 (promoted)
- Website: www.fcetzella.lu
Home colours	Away colours

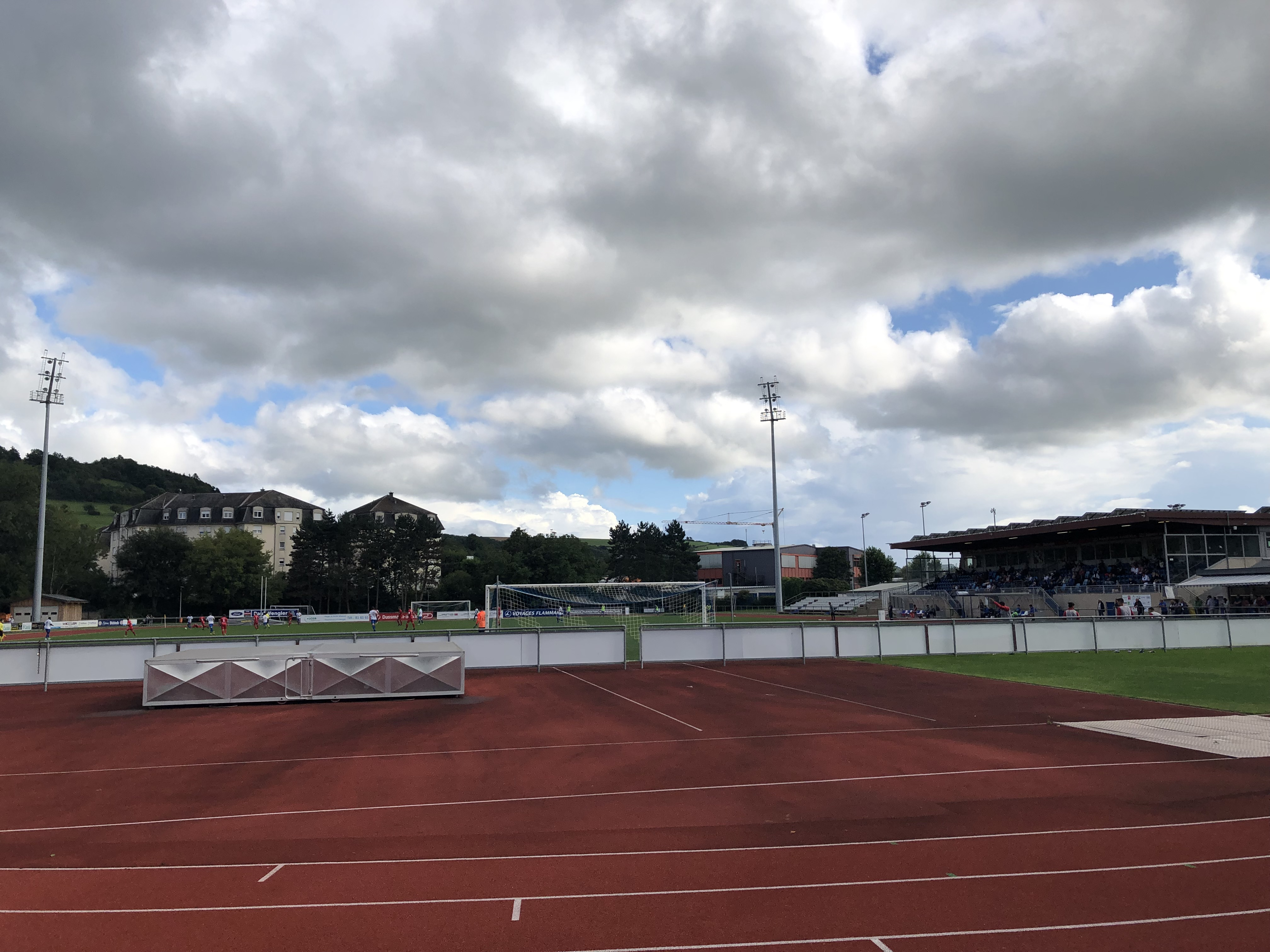
Stade Am Deich

Foussballclub Etzella Ettelbréck, abbreviated to either FC Etzella or Etzella Ettelbruck, is a football club based in Ettelbruck, in north-eastern Luxembourg. Etzella currently compete in the National Division, the top tier of Luxembourgish football.

Together with the FLF, Etzella host an annual National Football Day (French: Journée nationale du football), bringing together the youth teams of Luxembourg football clubs.

== History ==
In the 2005–06 season, Etzella finished third in the National Division, winning a place in the UEFA Cup first qualifying round, where they lost to Åtvidabergs FF of Sweden 7–0 on aggregate. In 2006–07, the club improved to a second-place finish, this time falling to HJK Helsinki of Finland 3–0 on aggregate in the UEFA Cup first qualifying round. In 2007–08 season, Etzella slipped to fourth place, but returned to European competition. In the first round of the Intertoto Cup, they beat Georgian side Locomotive Tbilisi by drawing 0–0 at home and 2–2 away, advancing to play Saturn Moscow Oblast in the second round.

=== Timeline ===
- 1917: Club founded as FC Etzella Ettelbruck
- 1940: Club renamed as FV Ettelbrück during the German occupation
- 1944: Original name FC Etzella Ettelbruck restored
- 1971: First season in National Division
- 1981: Moved to current stadium, Stade Am Deich
- 2001: Winners of Luxembourg Cup
- 2001: First participation in European competition (season 2001–02)
- 2005, 2007: Finished second in the National Division
- 2008: Won first round tie in Intertoto Cup

== Honours ==
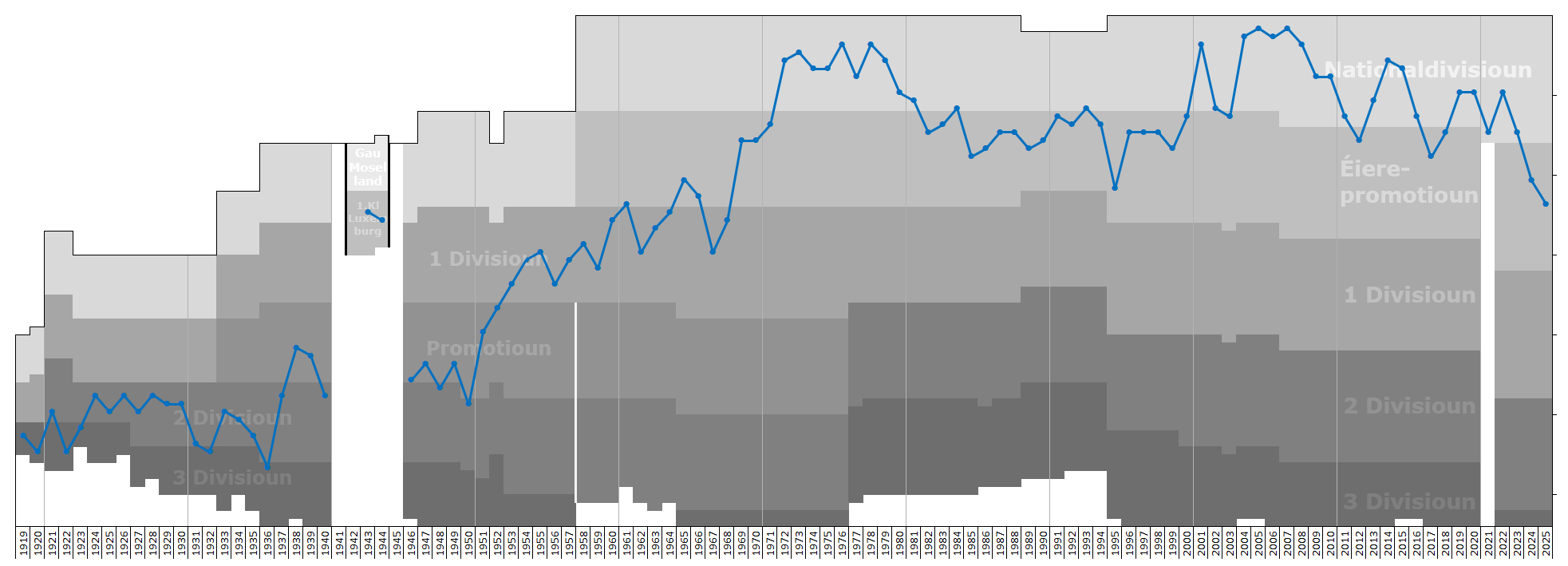
Historical league performance chart of Etzella Ettelbruck

- National Division

Runners-up (2): 2004-05, 2006–07

- Luxembourg Cup

Winners (1): 2000–01
Runners-up (3): 2002–03, 2003–04, 2018–19

== European competition ==
FC Etzella have qualified for UEFA European competition seven times.

- UEFA Cup

Qualifying round (6): 2001–02, 2003–04, 2004–05, 2005–06, 2006–07, 2007–08

- Intertoto Cup

Second round: 2008

Overall, Etzella's record in European competition reads:

	P	W	D	L	GF	GA	GD
UEFA Cup	12	0	0	12	4	36	−32
Intertoto Cup	4	0	3	1	3	10	−7

Season	Competition	Round	Club	Home	Away	Aggregate
2001-02	UEFA Cup	QR	(Poland) Legia Warsaw	0–4	1–2	1-6
2003-04	UEFA Cup	QR	(Croatia) Kamen Ingrad	1–2	0–7	1-9
2004-05	UEFA Cup	1QR	(Finland) Haka Valkeakoski	1–3	1–2	2-5
2005-06	UEFA Cup	1QR	(Iceland) Keflavík	0–4	0–2	0-6
2006-07	UEFA Cup	1QR	(Sweden) Åtvidaberg	0–3	0–4	0-7
2007-08	UEFA Cup	1QR	(Finland) HJK Helsinki	0–1	0–2	0-3
2008	UEFA Intertoto Cup	1R	(Georgia (country)) Locomotive Tbilisi	0-0	2–2	2-2 (a)
2008	UEFA Intertoto Cup	2R	(Russia) Saturn Ramenskoye	1-1	0–7	1-8

== Current squad ==
As of 15 September 2026

Note: Flags indicate national team as defined under FIFA eligibility rules; some limited exceptions apply. Players may hold more than one non-FIFA nationality.

No.	Pos.	Nation	Player
1	GK	LUX	Mathieu Michels
4	DF	LUX	Yanis N'Gbin
5	DF	IRL	Keleb Nwubani
6	DF	LUX	Pedro Moreira
7	DF	LUX	Gilson Delgado
8	MF	LUX	Benjamin Kovacevic
9	MF	LUX	Otavio Rodrigues
10	MF	LUX	Matheus Goncalves
11	FW	FRA	Simon Mubeya
14	MF	HAI	Johab Pascal
15	DF	GUI	Sékou Condé
17	MF	FRA	Henri Dupays
18	DF	LUX	Jader Soares

No.	Pos.	Nation	Player
20	MF	BRA	Gustavo Hemkemeier
22	DF	LUX	Jo Pimenta
23	MF	FRA	Kilian Gulluni
27	GK	TOG	Steven Mensah
28	FW	GER	Marco Reinhardt
29	FW	NIG	Kairou Amoustapha
32	DF	LUX	Lenny Oliveira
33	MF	ENG	Alexander Cvetković
60	DF	BEL	Yassin Lazaar
88	FW	LUX	Tiago Martins
90	FW	CPV	Justin Cardoso
97	MF	LUX	Lucas Figueiredo
-	GK	ARM	Albert Harutyunyan

== Former coaches ==
- (Luxembourg) Luc Holtz (July 1, 1998 – June 30, 2008)
- (Albania) Florim Aliaj (July 1, 2008 – Oct 1, 2008)
- (Portugal) Alvaro da Cruz (Oct 2, 2008 – June 30, 2009)
- (France) Benny Reiter (July 1, 2009 – June 30, 2010)
- (Belgium) Gauthier Remacle (July 1, 2010 – April 11, 2011)
- (Belgium) Eddie Rob (caretaker) (April 12, 2011 – June 30, 2011)
- (Luxembourg) Patrick Grettnich (July 1, 2011 – June 30, 2013)
- (Germany) Klaus-Peter Wagner (July 1, 2013–)

== Former chairmen ==
- Jean-Pierre Gauthier
