= 2018–19 Luxembourg Cup =

Tournament details
- Country: Luxembourg

Final positions
- Champions: F91 Dudelange
- Runners-up: Etzella Ettelbruck

The 2018–19 Luxembourg Cup was the 94th edition of the football knockout tournament in the country. The winners of the cup this season earned a place in the 2019–20 Europa League. The competition began on 5 September 2018 and ended on 26 May 2019.

Racing FC were the defending champions after winning the previous season's Luxembourg Cup final over Hostert on penalties.

== Teams ==
Round	National Division	Division of Honour	1. Division	2. Division	3. Division
Preliminary round				CS Oberkorn; Jeunesse Gilsdorf; Vinesca Ehnen; Jeunesse Biwer	Schengen; Les Aiglons Dalheim; Olympia Christnach; Kischpelt Wilwerwiltz
First round			Union 05 Kayl-Tétange; FC 47 Bastendorf; Mondercange; Jeunesse Useldange; Blo-Weiss Medernach; Berdenia Berbourg; Sporting Bertrange; Berdorf Consdorf; Alisontia Steinsel; Minerva Lintgen; Sporting Mertzig; Bettembourg; URB; Sanem; Marisca Mersch; Red Boys Aspelt; Syra Mensdorf; Alliance Äischdall; Grevenmacher; AS Luxemburg Porto; SC Steinfort; FF Norden 02; Schifflange 95; FC Lorentzweiler; Red Black Egalité; Jeunesse Schieren; Yellow Boys Weiler; Kehlen	Luna Oberkorn; Rupensia Lusitanos Larochette; SC Ell; Red Star Merl-Belair; Résidence Walferdange; ES Schouweiler; FC CeBra 01; Hosingen; FC Käerch; Orania Vianden; Wincrange; Blo Weiss Itzig; Boevange-Attert; Excelsior Grevels; The Belval Belvaux; Young Boys Diekirch; Les Ardoisiers Perlé; Avenir Beggen; Ehlerange; Daring Echternach; Pratzerthal-Redange; Green Boys; Feulen; US Rambrouch	Colmar-Berg; Tricolore Gasperich; Moutfort-Medingen; Brouch; Bourscheid; Noertzange; FC Biekerech; Minière Lasauvage; Claravallis Clervaux; Munsbach; Heiderscheid-Eschdorf; Racing Troisvierges; Kopstal 33; Reisdorf; US Folschette; Clemency
Second Round	Pétange; F91 Dudelange; US Hostert; UNA Strassen; Victoria Rosport; Etzella Ettelbruck; Fola Esch; Jeunesse Esch; Mamer 32; Differdange 03; Mondorf-les-Bains; Racing; Progrès Niedercorn; RM Hamm Benfica	Koeppchen Wormeldange; Union Mertert-Wasserbillig; Wiltz 71; Swift Hesperange; US Esch; Käerjeng 97; Mamer 32; Attert Bissen; Jeunesse Canach; US Sandweiler; Blue Boys Muhlenbach; Jeunesse Junglinster; Rodange 91; Erpeldange 72			

== Preliminary round ==
Four preliminary round matches were played 5 September 2018. The draw for the preliminary and first rounds was held 6 August 2018. Four teams each from tiers 5 (3. Division) and 4 (2. Division) took part.

Team 1	Score	Team 2
Schengen (5)	1–2	(4) CS Oberkorn
Les Aiglons Dalheim (5)	2–2 (a.e.t.) (10–11 p)	(4) Jeunesse Gilsdorf
Olympia Christnach (5)	4–1	(4) Vinesca Ehnen
Kischpelt Wilwerwiltz (5)	2–9	(4) Jeunesse Biwer

== First round ==
Thirty-six first round matches were played 7–12 September 2018. The draw for the preliminary and first rounds was held 6 August 2018. Seventeen teams from the lowest tier (5th level 3. Division) took part in this round.

Team 1	Score	Team 2
Luna Oberkorn (4)	1–3	(3) Union 05 Kayl-Tétange
Colmar-Berg (5)	3–1	(4) Rupensia Lusitanos Larochette
SC Ell (4)	0–5	(4) Jeunesse Biwer
Tricolore Gasperich (5)	1–3	(5) Moutfort-Medingen
Brouch (5)	1–9	(3) FC 47 Bastendorf
Bourscheid (5)	5–4	(5) Noertzange
Red Star Merl-Belair (4)	0–4	(3) Mondercange
Résidence Walferdange (4)	2–4	(3) Jeunesse Useldange
FC Biekerech (5)	0–11	(3) Blo-Weiss Medernach
Minière Lasauvage (5)	2–3	(4) ES Schouweiler
Claravallis Clervaux (5)	1–6	(3) Berdenia Berbourg
Munsbach (5)	0–6	(4) CeBra 01
Hosingen (4)	2–3	(4) FC Käerch
Heiderscheid-Eschdorf (5)	3–4	(4) Orania Vianden
Racing Troisvierges (5)	0–2	(4) Wincrange
Kopstal 33 (5)	0–7	(3) Sporting Bertrange
CS Oberkorn (4)	5–3	(3) Berdorf Consdorf
Blo Weiss Itzig (4)	3–0 (Forfeit)	(4) Boevange-Attert
Reisdorf (5)	0–4	(4) Excelsior Grevels
The Belval Belvaux (4)	0–4	(3) Alisontia Steinsel
US Folschette (5)	0–3	(4) Young Boys Diekirch
Les Ardoisiers Perlé (4)	1–0	(4) Avenir Beggen
Minerva Lintgen (3)	5–1	(3) Sporting Mertzig
Clemency (5)	2–5	(3) Bettembourg
Ehlerange (4)	0–2	(3) URB
Sanem (3)	6–4	(3) Marisca Mersch
Red Boys Aspelt (3)	0–3	(3) Syra Mensdorf
Daring Echternach (4)	5–0	(4) Pratzerthal-Redange
Alliance Äischdall (3)	2–1	(3) Grevenmacher
AS Luxemburg Porto (3)	0–1	(3) SC Steinfort
Green Boys (4)	1–3	(3) FF Norden 02
Feulen (4)	3–0	(4) US Rambrouch
Schifflange 95 (3)	2–1	(3) FC Lorentzweiler
Red Black Egalité (3)	1–2	(3) Jeunesse Schieren
Olympia Christnach (5)	1–9	(3) Yellow Boys Weiler
Jeunesse Gilsdorf (4)	2–4	(3) Kehlen

== Second round ==
Thirty-two second round matches were played between 21 and 23 September 2018. The draw for the second round was held 10 September 2018. Three teams from the fifth tier (3. Division) took part in this round: Colmar-Berg, Moutfort-Medingen, and Bourscheid.

Team 1	Score	Team 2
Colmar-Berg (5)	0–4	(1) Pétange
Kehlen (3)	1–7	(1) F91 Dudelange
Minerva Lintgen (3)	0–4	(1) US Hostert
Jeunesse Useldange (3)	1–6	(1) UNA Strassen
Blo-Weiss Medernach (3)	2–4 (a.e.t.)	(2) Koeppchen Wormeldange
CS Oberkorn (4)	1–5	(2) Union Mertert-Wasserbillig
ES Schouweiler (4)	0–6	(2) Wiltz 71
Jeunesse Schieren (3)	3–6	(2) Swift Hesperange
Mondercange (3)	0–1	(2) US Esch
SC Steinfort (3)	0–1	(1) Victoria Rosport
Wincrange (4)	0–6	(2) Käerjeng 97
FC 47 Bastendorf (3)	1–10	(1) Etzella Ettelbruck
Blo Weiss Itzig (4)	1–7	(1) Fola Esch
Berdenia Berbourg (3)	0–3	(1) Jeunesse Esch
Schifflange 95 (3)	1–4	(2) Mamer 32
FF Norden 02 (3)	1–2	(1) Differdange 03
FC Käerch (4)	2–7	(2) Attert Bissen
Young Boys Diekirch (4)	2–4	(2) Jeunesse Canach
Les Ardoisiers Perlé (4)	1–3 (a.e.t.)	(2) US Sandweiler
Jeunesse Biwer (4)	0–4	(2) Blue Boys Muhlenbach
Orania Vianden (4)	0–7	(1) Mondorf-les-Bains
Bettembourg (3)	0–7	(1) Racing
Feulen (4)	1–4	(1) Progrès Niedercorn
Alliance Äischdall (3)	4–3	(2) Jeunesse Junglinster
URB (3)	0–1	(1) Rumelange
Alisontia Steinsel (3)	0–1	(2) Rodange 91
Syra Mensdorf (3)	2–3	(2) Erpeldange 72
Daring Echternach (4)	0–4	(1) RM Hamm Benfica
Moutfort-Medingen (5)	2–3	(3) Sporting Bertrange
Sanem (3)	1–3	(3) Union 05 Kayl-Tétange
CeBra 01 (4)	3–0	(3) Yellow Boys Weiler
Bourscheid (5)	2–0	(4) Excelsior Grevels

== Third round ==
Sixteen third round matches were played 27–28 October 2018. The draw for the third round was held 24 September 2018. Bourscheid are the only remaining team competing from the lowest tier (5th tier 3. Division).

Team 1	Score	Team 2
Union Mertert-Wasserbillig (2)	5–1	(2) Koeppchen Wormeldange
Progrès Niedercorn (1)	1–0	(1) US Hostert
US Sandweiler (2)	0–6	(1) F91 Dudelange
Rumelange (1)	1–4	(1) UNA Strassen
US Esch (2)	2–1 (a.e.t.)	(1) Pétange
Erpeldange 72 (2)	2–6 (a.e.t.)	(1) RM Hamm Benfica
Jeunesse Canach (2)	0–2	(2) Attert Bissen
Mamer 32 (2)	0–1	(2) Blue Boys Muhlenbach
CeBra 01 (4)	0–2	(1) Etzella Ettelbruck
Sporting Bertrange (3)	3–2	(3) Alliance Äischdall
Bourscheid (5)	1–16	(1) Fola Esch
Swift Hesperange (2)	1–3	(1) Mondorf-les-Bains
Käerjeng 97 (2)	0–5	(1) Jeunesse Esch
Racing (1)	2–2 (a.e.t.) (4–5 p)	(1) Differdange 03
Rodange 91 (2)	1–1 (a.e.t.) (8–9 p)	(1) Victoria Rosport
Union 05 Kayl-Tétange (3)	1–1 (a.e.t.) (3–4 p)	(2) Wiltz 71

== Fourth round ==
The draw for the fourth round was held 5 November 2018. Seven of the eight matches were played on 9 December 2018 and the remaining match between Blue Boys Muhlenbach and Attert Bissen was played on 17 February 2019. Sporting Bertrange were the lowest ranked team left in the competition, competing in the third tier (1. Division).

Team 1	Score	Team 2
US Esch (2)	1–2	(1) Strassen
Blue Boys Muhlenbach (2)	1–0	(2) Attert Bissen
Mondorf-les-Bains (1)	2–1	(1) Differdange 03
F91 Dudelange (1)	2–1	(1) Fola Esch
Sporting Bertrange (3)	1–3	(2) Union Mertert-Wasserbillig
Wiltz 71 (2)	0–2	(1) Victoria Rosport
RM Hamm Benfica (1)	2–4	(1) Progrès Niedercorn
Etzella Ettelbruck (1)	1–0	(1) Jeunesse Esch

== Quarter-final ==
The draw for the quarter-final was held 13 November 2018 with the four matches played on 3 April 2019. Two teams from the second tier (Luxembourg Division of Honour) were still in the competition: Union Mertert-Wasserbillig and Blue Boys Muhlenbach.

Team 1	Score	Team 2
Etzella Ettelbruck (1)	1–1 (a.e.t.) (8–7 p)	(1) Strassen
F91 Dudelange (1)	3–2	(1) Mondorf-les-Bains
Blue Boys Muhlenbach (2)	0–3	(1) Progrès Niedercorn
Union Mertert-Wasserbillig (2)	2–0	(1) Victoria Rosport

== Semi-final ==
The draw for the semi-final was held 5 April 2019. Of the four remaining teams, only one team from outside the top flight (second tier Luxembourg Division of Honour) remained in the competition at this stage, Union Mertert-Wasserbillig.

Team 1	Score	Team 2
F91 Dudelange (1)	3–1	(1) Progrès Niedercorn
Union Mertert-Wasserbillig (2)	0–3	(1) Etzella Ettelbruck

== Final ==
26 May 2019
17:00

F91 Dudelange	5–0	Etzella Ettelbruck
Clément Couturier 55'; Dave Turpel 59'; Edisson Jordanov 66'; Dominik Stolz 69'; Nicolas Perez 88'

Stade Josy Barthel
Attendance: 2,866
Referee: Sergio Rodrigues

== See also ==
- 2018–19 Luxembourg National Division
