= 2013–14 Luxembourg Cup =

89th edition of the Luxembourg Cup

Tournament details
- Country: Luxembourg
- Teams: 105

Final positions
- Champions: Differdange 03
- Runners-up: F91 Dudelange

Tournament statistics
- Matches played: 101

The 2013–14 Luxembourg Cup was the 89th season of Luxembourg's annual football cup competition. It began on 1 September 2013 with Round 1 and ended on 23 May 2014 with the final. The winner of the competition would qualify for the first qualifying round of the 2014–15 UEFA Europa League. Jeunesse Esch are the defending champions, having won their thirteenth cup title last season.

== Calendar ==
Round	Date	Fixtures	New entrants
Round One	1 September 2013	17	34 (21 from 2013-14 2. Division, 13 from 2013-14 3. Division)
Round Two	15 September 2013	16	15 (7 from 2013-14 2. Division, 8 from 2013-14 3. Division)
Round Three	October 2013	22	28 (from 2013-14 1. Division)
Round Four	October 2013	18	14 (from 2013-14 Division of Honour)
Round Five	November 2013	16	14 (from 2013–14 Luxembourg National Division)
Round Six	December 2013	8	–
Quarterfinals	May 2014	4	–
Semifinals	May 2014	2	–
Final	May 2014	1	–

== Round 1 ==
34 teams from the 2. Division (IV) and 3. Division (V) entered in this round. The games were played on 1 September 2012.

Team 1	Score	Team 2
Daring Echternach (IV)	5−2	Red Star Merl/Belair (V)
Jeunesse Useldange (V)	2−2 (a.e.t.) (0−3 p)	FC Pratzerthal/Rédange (IV)
Sporting Bertrange (IV)	6−0	The Belval Belvaux (IV)
Les Aiglons Dalheim (V)	0−3 (awarded)	Sporting Bettembourg (IV)
Sporting Beckerich (V)	2−1 (a.e.t.)	Rupensia Lusitanos Larochette (V)
Kischpelt Wilwerwiltz (V)	2−5	FC Schifflingen 95 (IV)
Jeunesse Gilsdorf (IV)	1−4	Alisontia Steinsel (IV)
FC Ehlerange (IV)	2−0	Etoile Sportive Clemency (V)
Blo-Weiss Medernach (IV)	3−5 (a.e.t.)	FC Noertzange HF (V)
Olympia Christnach/Waldbillig (IV)	1−4	Jeunesse Schieren (IV)
Syra Mensdorf (IV)	1−2 (a.e.t.)	AS Hosingen (IV)
Racing Heiderscheid/Eschdorf (V)	0−4	US Folschette (V)
AS Colmar-Berg (IV)	1−3	Jeunesse Biwer (IV)
Sporting Mertzig (IV)	3−0	FC Red Black/Egalité 07 (V)
Vinesca Ehnen (V)	3−2	Racing Troisvierges (IV)
FC Kopstal 33 (V)	3−0 (awarded)	CS Bourscheid (IV)
FC Munsbach (IV)	4−3	Tricolore Gasperich (IV)

Bye: FC 47 Bastendorf, Red Boys Aspelt, US Moutfort/Medingen, SC Ell, FC Koerich/Simmern, FC Brouch, AS Luxemburg/Porto, Claravallis Clervaux, US Rambrouch, Minière Lasauvage, Les Ardoisiers Perlé, FC Schengen, Excelsior Grevels, Etoile Sportive Schouweiler, US Reisdorf

== Round 2 ==
The seventeen winners of Round 1 and the fifteen other teams from the 2. Division (IV) and 3. Division (V) competed in this round. The games were played on 15 September 2013.

Team 1	Score	Team 2
SC Ell (IV)	6−2	FC Koerich/Simmern (IV)
FC Noertzange HF (V)	1−3	FC 47 Bastendorf (IV)
Alisontia Steinsel (IV)	7−1	Claravallis Clervaux (V)
US Folschette (V)	4−5	US Rambrouch (V)
Sporting Bertrange (IV)	6−5	Red Boys Aspelt (IV)
Minière Lasauvage (V)	0−4	Sporting Bettembourg (IV)
Les Ardoisiers Perlé (V)	2−6	US Moutfort/Medingen (IV)
FC Schengen (V)	0−4	FC Brouch (IV)
FC Ehlerange (IV)	1−2	FC Schifflingen 95 (IV)
Sporting Mertzig (IV)	14−0	FC Kopstal 33 (V)
Excelsior Grevels (V)	0−4	Jeunesse Schieren (IV)
Etoile Sportive Schouweiler (V)	6−2	US Reisdorf (V)
Sporting Beckerich (V)	3−0 (awarded)	Daring Echternach (IV)
FC Pratzerthal/Rédange (IV)	2−3	AS Luxemburg/Porto (IV)
Jeunesse Biwer (IV)	2−1	Vinesca Ehnen (V)
AS Hosingen (IV)	5−1	FC Munsbach (IV)

== Round 3 ==
The sixteen winners of Round 2 competed in this round, as well as twenty-eight teams from Division 1 (III), which enter the competition in this round. The games were played on 6 October 2013.

Team 1	Score	Team 2
AS Hosingen (IV)	1−5	US Berdorf/Consdorf (III)
Etoile Sportive Schouweiler (V)	8−4	FC Brouch (IV)
SC Steinfort (III)	1−0	Union Remich/Bous (III)
FC Mamer 32 (III)	1−3	Atert Bissen (III)
Titus Lamadelaine (III)	3−1	Sporting Bettembourg (IV)
Résidence Walferdange (III)	3−1	AS Luxemburg/Porto (IV)
FC Schifflingen 95 (IV)	1−4	FC CeBra 01 (III)
CS Sanem (III)	3−2	FCM Young Boys Diekirch (III)
US Boevange/Attert (III)	2−5	FC Lorentzweiler (III)
Luna Obercorn (III)	4−6 (a.e.t.)	Orania Vianden (III)
US Feulen (III)	3−3 (a.e.t.) (3−2 p)	Sporting Mertzig (IV)
US Moutfort/Medingen (IV)	0−2	US Esch (III)
FC Kehlen (III)	2−0	Blo-Weiss Itzig (III)
Union Mertert/Wasserbillig (III)	2−5	Berdenia Berbourg (III)
Jeunesse Biwer (IV)	1−0	Jeunesse Schieren (IV)
Koeppchen Wormeldange (III)	4−1	Alisontia Steinsel (IV)
FC Avenir Beggen (III)	4−2	FC 47 Bastendorf (IV)
Sporting Beckerich (V)	0−5	FC Green Boys 77 Harlange-Tarchamps (III)
FC Minerva Lintgen (III)	6−0	US Rambrouch (V)
Yellow Boys Weiler-la-Tour (III)	0−2	CS Obercorn (III)
SC Ell (IV)	0−5	FC Monnerich (III)
AS Wincrange (III)	1−3	Sporting Bertrange (IV)

== Round 4 ==
The twenty-two winners of Round 3 competed in this round, as well as fourteen teams from Division of Honour (II), which enter the competition in this round. The games were played on 27 October 2013.

Team 1	Score	Team 2
Victoria Rosport (II)	6−2 (a.e.t.)	Alliance Äischdall (II)
Jeunesse Junglinster (II)	2−3	SC Steinfort (III)
CS Obercorn (III)	0−1	FC CeBra 01 (III)
Résidence Walferdange (III)	4−5 (a.e.t.)	Jeunesse Biwer (IV)
FC Monnerich (III)	2−2 (a.e.t.) (5−6 p)	Minerva Lintgen (III)
UNA Strassen (II)	3−1	US Esch (III)
Marisca Mersch (II)	1−6	US Mondorf-les-Bains (II)
Blue Boys Muhlenbach (II)	2−0	Berdenia Berbourg (III)
Etoile Sportive Schouweiler (V)	4−3	US Feulen (III)
Union 05 Kayl-Tétange (II)	3−0 (a.e.t.)	FC Green Boys 77 Harlange-Tarchamps (III)
Orania Vianden (III)	0−1 (a.e.t.)	Avenir Beggen (III)
CS Sanem (III)	2−6	Erpeldange 72 (II)
CS Pétange (II)	3−1	Koeppchen Wormeldange (III)
Sporting Bertrange (IV)	1−3	Atert Bissen (III)
US Berdorf/Consdorf (III)	2−4 (a.e.t.)	FF Norden 02 (II)
Kehlen (III)	0−3	US Hostert (II)
US Sandweiler (II)	2−1	Titus Lamadelaine (III)
Rodange 91 (II)	3−0	FC Lorentzweiler (III)

== Round 5 ==
The eighteen winners of Round 4 compete in this round, as well as the fourteen teams from the National Division (I), which enter the competition in this round. The games are played on 1 December 2013.

Team 1	Score	Team 2
Blue Boys Muhlenbach (II)	0−4	RFCU Luxembourg (I)
Union 05 Kayl-Tétange (II)	1−1 (5−6 p)	Grevenmacher (I)
US Mondorf-les-Bains (II)	0−2	Progrès Niederkorn (I)
Victoria Rosport (II)	2−2 (6−7 p)	Wiltz 71 (I)
Avenir Beggen (III)	1−1 (5−3 p)	Fola Esch (I)
FC CeBra 01 (III)	2−4	Etzella Ettelbruck (I)
FF Norden 02 (II)	0−4	Differdange 03 (I)
CS Pétange (II)	1−2	Jeunesse Esch (I)
Atert Bissen (III)	1−1 (5−6 p)	Jeunesse Canach (I)
US Hostert (II)	1−5	Käerjeng 97 (I)
Jeunesse Biwer (IV)	0−2	RM Hamm Benfica (I)
Etoile Sportive Schouweiler (V)	0−7	F91 Dudelange (I)
UNA Strassen (II)	5−1	Swift Hesperange (I)
Erpeldange 72 (II)	1−3	US Rumelange (I)
US Sandweiler (II)	1−2	Rodange 91 (II)
SC Steinfort (III)	1−0	Minerva Lintgen (III)

== Round 6 ==
The sixteen winners of Round 5 competed in this round. The games were played on 8 December 2013.

Team 1	Score	Team 2
FC Rodange 91 (II)	3−1	FC Etzella Ettelbruck (I)
Avenir Beggen (III)	1−6	Grevenmacher (I)
Differdange 03 (I)	4−3 (a.e.t.)	Jeunesse Canach (I)
Wiltz 71 (I)	1−2	Progrès Niederkorn (I)
Jeunesse Esch (I)	3−1	Käerjeng 97 (I)
SC Steinfort (III)	0−3	RFCU Luxembourg (I)
UNA Strassen (II)	2−1	RM Hamm Benfica (I)
US Rumelange (I)	0−3	F91 Dudelange (I)

== Quarter-finals ==
The eight winners from Round 6 competed in the quarterfinals. They were held on 1 March 2014.

Team 1	Score	Team 2
Jeunesse Esch (I)	5−0	UNA Strassen (II)
FC Rodange 91 (II)	1−2	F91 Dudelange (I)
Grevenmacher (I)	3−3 (3-4 p)	Progrès Niederkorn (I)
Differdange 03 (I)	1−0	RFCU Luxembourg (I)

== Semi-finals ==
The four winners from quarterfinals competed in the semifinals. They were held on 7 and 8 May 2014.

7 May 2014	Jeunesse Esch (I)	0–2	Differdange 03 (I)	Stade de la Frontière, Esch-sur-Alzette
19:30 CEST			Franzoni 18' (pen.); Meligner 49'

8 May 2014	F91 Dudelange (I)	3–1	Progrès Niederkorn (I)	Stade Jos Nosbaum, Dudelange
19:30 CEST	Benzouien 14'; Malget 23' da Mota 55'		P. Bossi 90+1'

== Final ==
23 May 2014
19:30 CEST

Differdange 03 (I)	2–0	F91 Dudelange (I)
Luisi 45+2'; Franzoni 55' (pen.)		Ney (red card) 54'

Stade Josy Barthel, Luxembourg City
Attendance: 2,900
Referee: Frank Bourgnon
