= 2015–16 Luxembourg Cup =

Tournament details
- Country: Luxembourg
- Teams: 104

Final positions
- Champions: F91 Dudelange
- Runners-up: Mondorf-les-Bains

The 2015–16 Luxembourg Cup was the 91st version of the annual knockout tournament. The competition began on 28 August 2015 and ended with the final on 29 May 2016.

== Format ==
This season, the Luxembourg Cup was a single elimination knockout tournament contested by 104 teams. The winner of the cup earned a spot in the Europa League. Matches which were levelled after regulation went to extra time and then to penalties in order to determine a winner.

== Schedule ==
Round	Date(s)	Number of fixtures	Clubs
First round	28–30 August 2015	16	104 → 88
Second round	11–13 September 2015	16	88 → 72
Third round	2–4 October 2015	22	72 → 50
Fourth round	30–31 October 2015	18	50 → 32
Fifth round	20–25 November 2015	16	32 → 16
Sixth round	5–6 December 2015	8	16 → 8
Quarter-finals	20 April 2016	4	8 → 4
Semi-finals	5 May 2016	2	4 → 2
Final	29 May 2016	1	2 → 1

== First round ==
Sixteen first round matches were played between 28 and 30 August 2015.

Team 1	Score	Team 2
SC Ell	6–2	Tricolore Gasperich
Rupensia Lusitanos	3–4	Sanem
Folschette	1–5	Pratzerthal-Redange
Red Blach/Egalité 07	0–0 (3–5 p)	Red Star Merl-Belair
Blo-Weiss Medernach	5–0	Moutfort/Medingen
Excelsior Grevels	1–4	Red Boys Aspelt
Colmar-Berg	0–4	Noertzange
Etoile Sportive Schouweiler	1–4	Reisdorf
Rambrouch	1–6	Schengen
Kischpelt Wilwerwiltz	1–6	Syra Mensdorf
Claravallis Clervaux	0–2	Ehlerange
Bourscheid	1–2	Minière Lasauvage
Vinesca Ehnen	1–0	Young Boys Diekirch
Berdorf Consdorf	4–4 (4–1 p)	Luna Obercorn
Olympia Christnach/Waldbillig	6–1	Racing Heiderscheid/Eschdorf
Luxembourg-Porto	1–3	Les Ardoisiers Perlé

== Second round ==
Sixteen second round matches were played between 11 and 13 September 2015.

Team 1	Score	Team 2
Sanem	1–1 (5–3 p)	Blo-Weiss Medernach
Red Boys Aspelt	2–1	Les Ardoisiers Perlé
Reisdorf	0–3	AS Hosingen
SC Ell	7–2	Kopstal 33
Minière Lasauvage	1–5 (a.e.t.)	Jeunesse Biwer
Syra Mensdorf	5–1	Vinesca Ehnen
Koerich/Simmern	1–4	Pratzerthal-Redange
Jeunesse Useldange	3–5	Noertzange
Olympia Christnach/Waldbillig	1–0	CeBra 01
Jeunesse Gilsdorf	3–2	Ehlerange
Sporting Club Steinfort	2–1	Berdorf Consdorf
Sporting Beckerich	1–3	Les Aiglons Dalheim
US Boevange/Attert	1–3	Blo-Weiss Itzig
Red Star Merl-Belair	2–3	Brouch
Schengen	4–5	Racing Troisvierges
Etoile Sportive Clemency	3–2 (a.e.t.)	Green Boys

== Third round ==
Twenty-two third round matches were played between 2–4 October 2015.

Team 1	Score	Team 2
The Belval Belvaux	2–7 (a.e.t.)	FC 47 Bastendorf
Jeunesse Junglinster	1–2	Alisontia Steinsel
Noertzange	2–5	FC Lorentzweiler
Feulen	2–4 (a.e.t.)	Résidence Walferdange
Atert Bissen	9–0	Etoile Sportive Clemency
Blue Boys Muhlenbach	5–0	Jeunesse Biwer
Sanem	0–3	Blo-Weiss Itzig
Bettembourg	1–3	AS Hosingen
Wincrange	0–3	Minerva Lintgen
Orania Vianden	7–2	Berdenia Berbourg
Marisca Mersch	5–0	SC Steinfort
Union Mertert-Wasserbillig	7–0	SC Ell
Syra Mensdorf	0–2	Daring-Club Echternach
Oberkorn	4–1	Jeunesse Gilsdorf
Red Boys Aspelt	3–2	Koeppchen Wormeldange
Jeunesse Schieren	2–1	Les Aiglons Dalheim
Sporting Bertrange	3–2	Schifflange 95
Munsbach	6–1	Yellow Boys Weiler
Sporting Mertzig	0–10	Esch
Alliance Äischdall	10–0	Olympia Christnach/Waldbillig
Racing Troisvierges	3–4	Kehlen
Brouch	3–0	Pratzerthal-Redange

== Fourth round ==
Eighteen fourth round matches were played 30–31 October 2015.

Team 1	Score	Team 2
Munsbach	2–4 (a.e.t.)	Käerjéng 97
Rodange 91	7–0	Brouch
Sporting Bertrange	2–1	Alliance Äischdall
Kehlen	0–1	Mamer 32
Blo-Weiss Itzig	0–5	Pétange
Minerva Lintgen	4–2	Daring-Club Echternach
FF Norden 02	3–2	URB
Erpeldange 72	3–1	Résidence Walferdange
Union 05 Kayl-Tétange	0–1	Avenir Beggen
AS Hosingen	3–4	FC 47 Bastendorf
Marisca Mersch	4–3	Sandweiler
Hostert	7–0	Orania Vianden
Alisontia Steinsel	2–3	Swift Hesperange
Union Mertert-Wasserbillig	2–3	Atert Bissen
Jeunesse Schieren	3–1	Mondercange
Red Boys Aspelt	0–2 (a.e.t.)	Jeunesse Canach
Esch	3–1	Oberkorn
Blue Boys Muhlenbach	3–0	FC Lorentzweiler

== Fifth round ==
Sixteen fifth round matches were played between 20 and 25 November 2015.

Team 1	Score	Team 2
FC 47 Bastendorf	0–5	Progrès Niederkorn
Jeunesse Schieren	1–4	Wiltz 71
Atert Bissen	1–2	Etzella Ettelbruck
Käerjéng 97	1–0	Grevenmacher
Hostert	1–2	Mondorf-les-Bains
Blue Boys Muhlenbach	0–3	Victoria Rosport
Mamer 32	0–2 (a.e.t.)	Rumelange
Minerva Lintgen	1–3	Fola Esch
Sporting Bertrange	0–4	RM Hamm Benfica
Jeunesse Canach	1–4 (a.e.t.)	Jeunesse Esch
Erpeldange 72	0–2	F91 Dudelange
Avenir Beggen	1–4	Differdange 03
Marisca Mersch	0–5	UNA Strassen
Rodange 91	3–4	Pétange
FF Norden 02	0–3	Esch
Swift Hesperange	2–3 (a.e.t.)	Racing

== Sixth round ==
The sixteen winners of the fifth round competed in this round. The matches were played on 5 and 6 December 2015.

Team 1	Score	Team 2
Progrès Niederkorn	0–4	Fola Esch
Käerjéng 97	3–2	Differdange 03
Rumelange	1–0	Wiltz 71
Racing	2–0	Victoria Rosport
Esch	0–1	Pétange
UNA Strassen	3–1	Etzella Ettelbruck
Jeunesse Esch	0–5	F91 Dudelange
Mondorf-les-Bains	2–0	RM Hamm Benfica

== Quarter-finals ==
The eight winners of the sixth round competed in this round. The matches were played on 19 April 2016.

Team 1	Score	Team 2
Käerjéng 97	2–4 (a.e.t.)	F91 Dudelange
Mondorf-les-Bains	2–0	Racing
Pétange	3–2	Rumelange
Fola Esch	4–0	UNA Strassen

== Semi-finals ==
The four winners of the quarter-finals competed in this round. The matches were played on 5 May 2016.

Team 1	Score	Team 2
F91 Dudelange	4–0 (a.e.t.)	Pétange
Mondorf-les-Bains	1–0	Fola Esch

== Final ==
The final match was played on 29 May 2016.

29 May 2016
17:00 CEST

F91 Dudelange	1–0	Mondorf-les-Bains
da Mota 32'	Report (in French)

Stade Josy Barthel
Attendance: 3,053
Referee: Alex Krueger

== See also ==
- 2015–16 Luxembourg National Division
