= 2020–21 Luxembourg Cup =

Tournament details
- Country: Luxembourg

Final positions
- Champions: abandoned, no champion

The 2020–21 Luxembourg Cup was the 96th year of the football knockout tournament in Luxembourg. The cup began on 2 September 2020. If the cup had been completed, the winner of the cup would have earned a place in the 2021–22 UEFA Europa Conference League.

The previous season's cup was abandoned due to the COVID-19 pandemic in Luxembourg.

For the second consecutive season, the cup was cancelled due to complications caused by the COVID-19 pandemic in Luxembourg.

== Preliminary round ==
Six preliminary round matches were played on 2 September 2020. The draw for the preliminary and first rounds was held on 14 August 2020.

Team 1	Score	Team 2
FC Schengen	4–3	Jeunesse Biwer
Claravallis Clervaux	4–2	FC Biekerech
Orania Vianden	0–1	FC Munsbach
Excelsior Grevels	1–3	Green Boys
Jeunesse Gilsdorf	4–2	Racing Heiderscheid-Eschdorf
US Moutfort-Medingen	3–3 (a.e.t.) (5–4 p)	Red Star Merl-Belair

== First round ==
Thiry-two first round matches were played on 9 September 2020. The draw for the preliminary and first rounds was held on 14 August 2020.

Team 1	Score	Team 2
Etoile Sportive Clemency	1–3	Jeunesse Schieren
US Moutfort-Medingen	1–4	Red Black Egalité
AS Colmarberg	1–5	Sporting Mertzig
Red Boys Aspelt	0–1	FC Käerch
Minerva Lintgen	1–2	Blo Weiss Itzig
Green Boys	2–1	US Berdorf Consdorf
Tricolore Gasperich	1–2	US Feulen
Rupensia Lusitanos Larochette	1–0	Alliance Äischdall
Grevenmacher	6–2	Union Remich-Bous
The Belval Belvaux	2–3	FF Norden 02
AS Luxemburg Porto	4–3	Koeppchen Wormeldange
Claravallis Clervaux	2–3	FC Noertzange
CS Bourscheid	1–2	FC Munsbach
Olympia Christnach-Waldbillig	0–5	AS Wincrange
US Reisdorf	0–5	CeBra 01
ES Schouweiler	2–3	CS Sanem
FC Ehlerange	3–0	FC Kopstal 33
FC 47 Bastendorf	3–4	FC Stengefort
Les Ardoisiers Perlé	1–4	FC Schengen
Kischpelt Wilwerwiltz	4–2	Minière Lasauvage
Jeunesse Gilsdorf	3–2	Résidence Walferdange
Syra Mensdorf	8–0	US Boevange-Attert
Luna Oberkorn	0–2	Union 05 Kayl-Tétange
Avenir Beggen	2–2 (a.e.t.) (5–4 p)	Jeunesse Useldange
SC Ell	1–5	FC Lorentzweiler
FC Brouch	2–3	FC Pratzerthal-Redange
Les Aiglons Dalheim	1–3	FC Erpeldange 72
Racing Troisvierges	2–1	Sporting Bertrange
US Folschette	0–2	CS Oberkorn
Kehlen	1–0	AS Hosingen
US Rambrouch	0–5	Young Boys Diekirch
Sandweiler	0–0 (a.e.t.) (4–5 p)	Daring Echternach

== Second round ==
Thirty-one of thirty-two second round matches were played from 16–18 October 2020 before the competition was cancelled. The draw for the second round was held on 14 September 2020.

Team 1	Score	Team 2
FC Käerch	2–4	Atert Bissen
Green Boys	0–8	Wiltz
FC Pratzerthal-Redange	0–4	Fola Esch
CS Oberkorn	1–1 (a.e.t.) (5–3 p)	US Esch
AS Wincrange	0–2	Rodange 91
FF Norden 02	1–2	RM Hamm Benfica
Avenir Beggen	3–2 (a.e.t.)	Mondercange
Kischpelt Wilwerwiltz	0–10	Rumelange
Sporting Mertzig	0–5	F91 Dudelange
FC Schengen	1–5	Differdange 03
US Feulen	0–1	Hostert
FC Noertzange	0–6	Jeunesse Esch
Jeunesse Gilsdorf	1–2	Etzella Ettelbruck
Jeunesse Schieren	1–2	Union Titus Pétange
CS Sanem	1–0	Bettembourg
FC Ehlerange	4–3	Berdenia Berbourg
Union 05 Kayl-Tétange	3–4	Yellow Boys Weiler
Young Boys Diekirch	0–6	Mondorf-les-Bains
FC Munsbach	2–4	Alisontia Steinsel
FC Lorentzweiler	2–0	Marisca Mersch
Racing Troisvierges	0–11	Racing FC
Kehlen	0–2	Progrès Niederkorn
AS Luxemburg Porto	2–5	Victoria Rosport
FC Stengefort	1–3	Jeunesse Junglinster
FC Erpeldange 72	1–3	Schifflange
Swift Hesperange	4–0	Blo Weiss Itzig
Rupensia Lusitanos Larochette	0–4	Jeunesse Canach
CeBra 01	2–3	UNA Strassen
Grevenmacher	2–3	Käerjeng 97
Daring Echternach	1–3	Union Mertert-Wasserbillig
Syra Mensdorf	1–0	Mamer 32
Red Black Egalité	–	Blo-Weiss Medernach

== Third round ==
Sixteen third round matches were scheduled to be played on 6 March 2021 before the competition was cancelled.

Team 1	Score	Team 2
Union Titus Pétange	Cancelled	Etzella Ettelbruck
Racing FC	Cancelled	Differdange 03
FC Ehlerange	Cancelled	Jeunesse Canach
Syra Mensdorf	Cancelled	RM Hamm Benfica
Avenir Beggen	Cancelled	Fola Esch
Union Mertert-Wasserbillig	Cancelled	Rumelange
Alisontia Steinsel	Cancelled	F91 Dudelange
CS Oberkorn	Cancelled	Hostert
Käerjeng 97	Cancelled	Swift Hesperange
Schifflange	Cancelled	Wiltz
CS Sanem	Cancelled	Rodange 91
FC Lorentzweiler	Cancelled	Mondorf-les-Bains
Atert Bissen	Cancelled	Jeunesse Esch
Jeunesse Junglinster	Cancelled	Yellow Boys Weiler
Red Black Egalité / Blo-Weiss Medernach	Cancelled	Progrès Niederkorn
Victoria Rosport	Cancelled	UNA Strassen

== See also ==
- 2020–21 Luxembourg National Division
