= 2019–20 Luxembourg Cup =

Tournament details
- Country: Luxembourg

Final positions
- Champions: abandoned, no champion

The 2019–20 Luxembourg Cup was the 95th year of the football knockout tournament in Luxembourg. The cup began on 4 September 2019.

F91 Dudelange were the defending champions after winning the Luxembourg Cup final in the previous season over Etzella Ettelbruck by the score of 5–0.

On 22 April 2020, the cup was abandoned due to the COVID-19 pandemic in Luxembourg.

== Preliminary round ==
The draw for the preliminary round was held on 22 July 2019. The four preliminary round matches were played 4 September 2019. The highest scoring fixture in the round was US Folschette's 5–0 away win against FC Excelsior Grevels.

Team 1	Score	Team 2
AS Wincrange	1–2	Etoile Sportive Clemency
FC Racing Heiderscheid-Eschdorf	1–4	FC Nörtzingen H.F.
CS Bourscheid	1–2	FC Olympia Christnach-Waldbillig
FC Excelsior Grevels	0–5	US Folschette

== First round ==
The draw for the first round was held on 22 July 2019. Thirty-six first round matches were played on between 5 and 8 September 2019. The match between Noertzange and Boevange-Attert originally finished 4–2 but was later awarded to Noertzange by walkover. Elsewhere in the round, the highest scoring matches featured a total of 10 goals: Berdenia Berbourg overcame Racing Troisvierges 9–1 away from home, while Blo Weiss Itzig beat Feulen by the same score at home. The biggest margin of victory - 9 goals - was recorded by Koeppchen Wormeldange and Lorentzweiler, both winning 9–0 in away matches, against Olympia Christnach and Moutfort-Medingen respectively.

Team 1	Score	Team 2
Résidence Walferdange	4–2	FC Erpeldange 72
CeBra 01	1–2	Minerva Lintgen
Luna Oberkorn	0–2	Sanem
Les Aiglons Dalheim	0–3	Sandweiler
Clemency	2–6	FF Norden 02
AS Luxemburg Porto	1–0	Sporting Mertzig
Alliance Äischdall	2–3	Union 05 Kayl-Tétange
Racing Troisvierges	1–9	Berdenia Berbourg
US Rambrouch	0–3	Union Remich-Bous
Kehlen	4–1	Marisca Mersch
Jeunesse Biwer	0–2	The Belval Belvaux
Blo Weiss Itzig	9–1	Feulen
FC 47 Bastendorf	5–1	FC Käerch
Daring Echternach	1–0	Attert Bissen
Olympia Christnach	0–9	Koeppchen Wormeldange
Kopstal 33	3–5 (a.e.t.)	SC Ell
Moutfort-Medingen	0–9	Lorentzweiler
Munsbach	7–2	Brouch
US Folschette	0–1	Avenir Beggen
Pratzerthal-Redange	2–1	Young Boys Diekirch
Green Boys	3–0	Sporting Bertrange
Les Ardoisiers Perlé	2–4	SC Steinfort
Noertzange	4–2	Boevange-Attert
FC Biekerech	2–4	Red Star Merl-Belair
Tricolore Gasperich	3–1	Reisdorf
Rupensia Lusitanos Larochette	2–2 (a.e.t.) (6–5 p)	Colmarberg
Claravallis Clervaux	1–5	Berdorf Consdorf
Jeunesse Schieren	4–0	Hosingen
Ehlerange	1–5	Schengen
Jeunesse Useldange	1–7	Grevenmacher
Kischpelt Wilwerwiltz	2–5	Red Boys Aspelt
CS Oberkorn	0–2	Schifflange
Jeunesse Gilsdorf	1–2	Minière Lasauvage
Syra Mensdorf	3–4	Bettembourg
Vinesca Ehnen	2–1	Orania Vianden
ES Schouweiler	1–3 (a.e.t.)	Red Black Egalité

== Second round ==
The draw for the second round was held on 9 September 2019. Thirty-two second round matches were played on 21 and 22 September 2019. Defending champions F91 Dudelange entered the cup in this round, beating Daring Echternach by a 6–1 margin in an away fixture.

Team 1	Score	Team 2
Pratzerthal-Redange	1–5	Jeunesse Junglinster
Green Boys	2–4 (a.e.t.)	US Esch
Union Remich-Bous	0–2	Progrès Niederkorn
Berdenia Berbourg	2–3	Wiltz
FF Norden 02	0–4	Alisontia Steinsel
Daring Echternach	1–6	F91 Dudelange
Minerva Lintgen	0–6	Jeunesse Canach
Avenir Beggen	0–1	Etzella Ettelbruck
Schifflange	1–5	Differdange 03
The Belval Belvaux	0–6	Swift Hesperange
Koeppchen Wormeldange	1–4	Käerjeng 97
Vinesca Ehnen	0–7	Union Titus Pétange
Grevenmacher	1–2	Fola Esch
Noertzange	0–4	Jeunesse Esch
Munsbach	3–6	Blue Boys Muhlenbach
SC Steinfort	2–1 (a.e.t.)	Yellow Boys Weiler
SC Ell	0–3	Mondercange
Tricolore Gasperich	0–3	Rodange 91
FC 47 Bastendorf	0–2	Rumelange
AS Luxemburg Porto	0–7	Racing FC
Résidence Walferdange	0–7	RM Hamm Benfica
Jeunesse Schieren	1–2	Union Mertert-Wasserbillig
Minière Lasauvage	1–6	Victoria Rosport
Red Boys Aspelt	1–3	UNA Strassen
Red Black Egalité	1–4	Hostert
Red Star Merl-Belair	0–4	Mondorf-les-Bains
Sandweiler	0–4	Mamer 32
Schengen	4–5 (a.e.t.)	Blo-Weiss Medernach
Kehlen	2–1 (a.e.t.)	Sanem
Rupensia Lusitanos Larochette	2–5	Blo Weiss Itzig
Bettembourg	3–2	Union 05 Kayl-Tétange
Berdorf Consdorf	2–3	Lorentzweiler

== Third round ==
The draw for the third round was held on 25 September 2019. Sixteen third round matches were played on 9 and 10 November 2019. Bettembourg had the widest margin of victory in the round, winning 6–0 at home to Blo-Weiss Medernach.

Team 1	Score	Team 2
SC Steinfort	0–2	Victoria Rosport
Bettembourg	6–0	Blo-Weiss Medernach
Kehlen	1–0 (a.e.t.)	Mamer 32
Rumelange	0–4	UNA Strassen
US Esch	4–0	Käerjeng 97
Mondercange	4–0	Alisontia Steinsel
Jeunesse Canach	2–0	Etzella Ettelbruck
Jeunesse Junglinster	1–2	Jeunesse Esch
Lorentzweiler	0–5	Progrès Niederkorn
Blo Weiss Itzig	2–4	Differdange 03
Rodange 91	1–3	Mondorf-les-Bains
Union Mertert-Wasserbillig	0–2	F91 Dudelange
RM Hamm Benfica	1–2	Swift Hesperange
Wiltz	2–0	Blue Boys Muhlenbach
Racing FC	5–1	Hostert
Union Titus Pétange	1–2	Fola Esch

== Fourth round ==
The draw for the fourth round was held on 15 November 2019. Eight fourth round matches were played on 7 and 8 December 2019. The game between Mondercange and Fola Esch was the only one not decided within 90 minutes. After extra time failed to settle things, Mondercange prevailed on penalties.

Team 1	Score	Team 2
Mondercange	1–1 (a.e.t.) (4–2 p)	Fola Esch
Wiltz	3–0	Jeunesse Esch
Swift Hesperange	5–0	Jeunesse Canach
US Esch	0–1	Differdange 03
Racing FC	5–1	UNA Strassen
F91 Dudelange	4–1	Mondorf-les-Bains
Kehlen	0–3	Progrès Niederkorn
Bettembourg	0–3	Victoria Rosport

== Quarter-finals ==
The quarter-final matches were scheduled to be played on 15 April 2020. The matches were not played and the tournament was abandoned following the onset of the COVID-19 pandemic in Luxembourg.

Team 1	Score	Team 2
Swift Hesperange	Cancelled	Differdange 03
Wiltz	Cancelled	F91 Dudelange
Progrès Niederkorn	Cancelled	Victoria Rosport
Mondercange	Cancelled	Racing FC

== See also ==
- 2019–20 Luxembourg National Division
