= 2017–18 Luxembourg Cup =

Tournament details
- Country: Luxembourg
- Teams: 104

Final positions
- Champions: Racing FC
- Runners-up: Hostert

The 2017–18 Luxembourg Cup is the 93rd version of the football knockout tournament. This competition began on 9 September 2017. The winners of the cup will earn a spot in the 2018–19 Europa League and would begin play in the first qualifying round.

F91 Dudelange are the defending champions after winning the previous season's Luxembourg Cup by defeating Fola Esch in the final by a score of 4–1.

== Format ==
This season's Cup will be a single elimination knockout tournament contested between 104 clubs. Matches which are level after regulation will advance to extra time and then to penalties to determine a winner.

== Preliminary round ==
Four preliminary round matches were played.

Team 1	Score	Team 2
Luna Oberkorn	0–3	Jeunesse Schieren
Les Ardoisiers Perlé	5–1	Heiderscheid/Eschdorf
Jeunesse Useldange	1–0	Hosingen
US Rambrouch	1–5	Blo Weiss Itzig

== First round ==
Thirty-six first round matches were played 9–10 September 2017.

Team 1	Score	Team 2
URB	4–0	Boevange/Attert
Kischpelt Wilwerwiltz	4–0	Brouch
Koeppchen Wormeldange	8–0	Jeunesse Biwer
Green Boys	1–1 (a.e.t.) (3–5 p)	Orania Vianden
Syra Mensdorf	4–4 (a.e.t.) (2–3 p)	Wincrange
Tricolore Gasperich	0–3	Minerva Lintgen
Jeunesse Junglinster	7–0	Bourscheid
CS Oberkorn	3–2	Kehlen
Pratzerthal-Redange	4–2	Avenir Beggen
Red Star Merl-Belair	1–4	Sanem
Munsbach	1–2	Reisdorf
Blo-Weiss Medernach	4–0	Atert Bissen
Bettembourg	3–1	Berdenia Berbourg
Alliance Äischdall	2–1 (a.e.t.)	Sporting Bertrange
Colmar-Berg	3–2 (a.e.t.)	Koerich/Simmern
Schifflange 95	0–1	AS Luxemburg/Porto
Olympia Christnach	0–6	Alisontia Steinsel
Noertzange	3–4	Racing Troisvierges
FC 47 Bastendorf	0–1	FC Lorentzweiler
Les Aiglons Dalheim	2–5	Ehlerange
Moutfort/Medingen	4–3	Minière Lasauvage
Berdorf Consdorf	2–1	Résidence Walferdange
Clemency	0–8	The Belval Belvaux
FC Beckerich	2–3	Sporting Mertzig
Schengen	1–6	Feulen
Excelsior Grevels	3–5	Vinesca Ehnen
Daring Echternach	1–1 (a.e.t.) (3–1 p)	SC Ell
Claravallis Clervaux	3–5	Kopstal 33
Rupensia Lusitanos Larochette	1–4	SC Steinfort
Jeunesse Gilsdorf	1–4	Marisca Mersch
US Folschette	3–8	Young Boys Diekirch
Mondercange	3–3 (a.e.t.) (2–4 p)	Yellow Boys Weiler
ES Schouweiler	1–5	CeBra 01
Jeunesse Schieren	1–0	Red Black/Egalité 07
Les Ardoisiers Perlé	2–3	Jeunesse Useldange
Blo Weiss Itzig	4–1	Red Boys Aspelt

== Second round ==
Thirty-two second round matches were played 21–24 September 2017. The second round draw was held 11 September 2017.

Team 1	Score	Team 2
Sporting Mertzig	0–5	Hostert
The Belval Belvaux	0–2	Blue Boys Muhlenbach
Wincrange	1–5	Fola Esch
Pratzerthal-Redange	3–5	Jeunesse Useldange
AS Luxemburg/Porto	0–1	Victoria Rosport
FC Lorentzweiler	0–4	US Sandweiler
URB	1–2	Mondorf-les-Bains
Kischpelt Wilwerwiltz	0–13	F91 Dudelange
Sanem	0–8	Racing FC
SC Steinfort	0–2	RM Hamm Benfica
Reisdorf	0–8	US Rumelange
Vinesca Ehnen	0–7	Union Titus Pétange
Minerva Lintgen	0–3	Differdange 03
Blo Weiss Itzig	1–2	Mamer 32
Kopstal 33	0–5	Jeunesse Canach
CS Oberkorn	1–6	UNA Strassen
CeBra 01	0–4	Esch
Yellow Boys Weiler	1–3	Union Mertert-Wasserbillig
Feulen	1–5	Erpeldange 72
Marisca Mersch	1–3	Progrès Niederkorn
Blo-Weiss Medernach	1–3	Rodange 91
Young Boys Diekirch	1–6	Swift Hesperange
Racing Troisvierges	1–16	Jeunesse Esch
Daring Echternach	1–4	Käerjéng 97
Bettembourg	2–4	Grevenmacher
Colmar-Berg	1–2	FF Norden 02
Moutfort/Medingen	0–10	Etzella Ettelbruck
Orania Vianden	2–4	Union 05 Kayl-Tétange
Ehlerange	1–2	Koeppchen Wormeldange
Alliance Äischdall	0–5	Jeunesse Junglinster
Berdorf Consdorf	1–0	Jeunesse Schieren
Alisontia Steinsel	0–1	Wiltz

== Third round ==
Sixteen third round matches were played 27 and 29 October 2017. The third round draw was held on 2 October 2017.

Team 1	Score	Team 2
US Rumelange	3–0	Victoria Rosport
Fola Esch	2–3	Union Titus Pétange
Jeunesse Esch	2–1	UNA Strassen
FF Norden 02	0–9	Differdange 03
Berdorf Consdorf	1–2	Esch
Swift Hesperange	0–1	Mondorf-les-Bains
Wiltz	3–1 (a.e.t.)	Etzella Ettelbruck
Union 05 Kayl-Tétange	1–2	Erpeldange 72
F91 Dudelange	3–3 (a.e.t.) (4–5 p)	Progrès Niederkorn
Jeunesse Useldange	0–2	Hostert
Koeppchen Wormeldange	0–2	RM Hamm Benfica
Union Mertert-Wasserbillig	0–4	Racing FC
Blue Boys Muhlenbach	3–2	Jeunesse Canach
US Sandweiler	0–1	Käerjéng 97
Mamer 32	1–2	Rodange 91
Jeunesse Junglinster	1–1 (a.e.t.) (3–4 p)	Grevenmacher

== Fourth round ==
Eight fourth round matches were played on 25 March 2018 and 4 April 2018. The fourth round draw was held on 30 October 2017.

Team 1	Score	Team 2
US Rumelange	0–2	Wiltz
Union Titus Pétange	1–0	Progrès Niederkorn
Jeunesse Esch	1–3	Racing FC
Grevenmacher	1–0	Mondorf-les-Bains
Käerjéng 97	1–5	Rodange 91
Erpeldange 72	0–2	Differdange 03
RM Hamm Benfica	0–5	Hostert
Blue Boys Muhlenbach	0–1	Esch

== Quarter–finals ==
Four quarter–final matches were played on 18 April 2018. The quarter–final round draw was held on 5 April 2018.

Team 1	Score	Team 2
Grevenmacher	0–1	Differdange 03
Union Titus Pétange	1–2	Racing FC
Hostert	2–1	Esch
Wiltz	3–2	Rodange 91

== Semi–finals ==
The semi–final matches are scheduled to be played on 9 May 2018. The semi–final round draw was held on 20 April 2018.

Team 1	Score	Team 2
Racing FC	1–0	Differdange 03
Wiltz	1–2	Hostert

== Final ==
27 May 2018
17:00 CEST

Hostert	0–0 (a.e.t.)	Racing FC
	Report	Nouidra (red card) 72'; Nyssen (red card) 82'
Penalties
René Peters (penalty scored); Guillaume Mura (penalty missed); Julien Bertoux (penalty missed); Admir Desevic (penalty scored); Aldin Dervisevic (penalty scored)	3–4	(penalty scored) Jonathan Hennetier; (penalty missed) Pape Mboup; (penalty scored) Florik Shala; (penalty scored) Henrique da Silva Gomes; (penalty scored) Julien Jahier

Stade Josy Barthel, Luxembourg City
Attendance: 3,273
Referee: Antoine Monteiro

== See also ==
- 2017–18 Luxembourg National Division
