= 2017–18 Luxembourg National Division =

104th season of top flight football in Luxembourg

Luxembourg National Division
- Season: 2017–18
- Dates: 4 August 2017 – 19 May 2018
- Champions: F91 Dudelange
- Relegated: Rodange 91; Esch
- Champions League: F91 Dudelange
- Europa League: Progrès Niederkorn; Fola Esch; Racing FC
- Matches: 182
- Goals: 633 (3.48 per match)
- Top goalscorer: David Turpel (33 goals)
- Biggest home win: Fola Esch 9–0 US Esch (30 March 2018)
- Biggest away win: Differdange 03 0–6 F91 Dudelange (13 May 2018); UNA Strassen 0–6 Progrès Niederkorn (19 August 2017)
- Highest scoring: Fola Esch 9–0 US Esch (30 March 2018); Fola Esch 6–3 Differdange 03 (15 October 2017)
- All statistics correct as of 19 May 2018.

The 2017–18 Luxembourg National Division was the 104th season of top-flight football in Luxembourg. The season began on 4 August 2017 and concluded on 19 May 2018. F91 Dudelange were the defending champions from the previous season.

== Teams ==
The bottom two teams from the previous season, Rumelange and UN Käerjéng 97, were relegated to the 2017–18 Luxembourg Division of Honour. They were replaced by Esch and Rodange 91, champions and runners-up respectively of the 2016–17 Luxembourg Division of Honour.

In addition, the third-placed team from the previous season's Division of Honour, Hostert, defeated the third-from-bottom top-flight team, Jeunesse Canach, in a play-off to seal their top-flight spot for 2017–18.

Locations of the 2017–18 Luxembourg National Division teams

=== Stadia and locations ===
| Team | Location | Stadium | Capacity |
|---|---|---|---|
| Differdange 03 | Differdange | Stade Parc des Sports | 2,400 |
| Esch | Esch-sur-Alzette | Stade Walter Malget | 1,500 |
| F91 Dudelange | Dudelange | Stade Jos Nosbaum | 2,558 |
| Fola Esch | Esch-sur-Alzette | Stade Émile Mayrisch | 3,826 |
| Hostert | Hostert | Stade Jos Becker | 1,500 |
| Jeunesse Esch | Esch-sur-Alzette | Stade de la Frontière | 5,400 |
| Mondorf-les-Bains | Mondorf-les-Bains | Stade Jeannot Mayrisch | 3,600 |
| Progrès Niederkorn | Niederkorn | Stade Jos Haupert | 2,800 |
| Racing FC | Luxembourg City | Stade Josy Barthel | 9,000 |
| RM Hamm Benfica | Hamm, Luxembourg City | Terrain de Football Cents | 2,800 |
| Rodange 91 | Hesperange | Stade Jeffrey Strauss | 900 |
| UNA Strassen | Strassen | Stade Municipal de Strassen | 2,000 |
| Union Titus Pétange | Pétange | Stade Municipal de Pétange | 2,400 |
| Victoria Rosport | Rosport | VictoriArena | 1,000 |

Source: Scoresway

== League table ==
| Pos | Team | Pld | W | D | L | GF | GA | GD | Pts | Qualification or relegation |
|---|---|---|---|---|---|---|---|---|---|---|
| 1 | F91 Dudelange (C) | 26 | 22 | 2 | 2 | 81 | 26 | +55 | 68 | Qualification for the Champions League first qualifying round |
| 2 | Progrès Niederkorn | 26 | 20 | 3 | 3 | 72 | 28 | +44 | 63 | Qualification for the Europa League first qualifying round |
| 3 | Fola Esch | 26 | 14 | 5 | 7 | 72 | 41 | +31 | 47 | Qualification for the Europa League first qualifying round |
| 4 | Jeunesse Esch | 26 | 13 | 5 | 8 | 52 | 35 | +17 | 44 | |
| 5 | Differdange 03 | 26 | 11 | 5 | 10 | 48 | 38 | +10 | 38 | |
| 6 | Mondorf-les-Bains | 26 | 10 | 8 | 8 | 40 | 36 | +4 | 38 | |
| 7 | Racing FC | 26 | 9 | 8 | 9 | 41 | 40 | +1 | 35 | Qualification for the Europa League first qualifying round (Note: Racing FC qualified for the Europa League first qualifying round by winning 2017–18 Luxembourg Cup.) |
| 8 | Hostert | 26 | 9 | 7 | 10 | 37 | 46 | −9 | 34 | |
| 9 | Union Titus Pétange | 26 | 9 | 4 | 13 | 43 | 51 | −8 | 31 | |
| 10 | RM Hamm Benfica | 26 | 8 | 6 | 12 | 30 | 45 | −15 | 30 | |
| 11 | UNA Strassen | 26 | 8 | 5 | 13 | 38 | 60 | −22 | 29 | |
| 12 | Victoria Rosport (O) | 26 | 7 | 5 | 14 | 37 | 59 | −22 | 26 | Qualification for the relegation play-offs |
| 13 | Rodange 91 (R) | 26 | 4 | 10 | 12 | 27 | 55 | −28 | 22 | Relegation to the Luxembourg Division of Honour |
| 14 | Esch (R) | 26 | 1 | 1 | 24 | 15 | 73 | −58 | 4 | Relegation to the Luxembourg Division of Honour |

Source: UEFA, Soccerway
Rules for classification: 1) Points; 2) Goal difference; 3) Matches won; 4) Head-to-head points; 5) Head-to-head goal difference; 6) Head-to-head goals scored; 7) Play-off.
(C) Champions; (O) Play-off winners; (R) Relegated

== Results ==
Each team played every other team in the league home-and-away for a total of 26 matches played each.

| Home \ Away | DIF | USE | DUD | FOL | HOS | JEU | MON | PRO | RAC | RMH | ROD | UNA | UTP | VIC |
|---|---|---|---|---|---|---|---|---|---|---|---|---|---|---|
| Differdange 03 | — | 4–1 | 0–6 | 0–2 | 2–2 | 2–0 | 4–0 | 1–2 | 2–1 | 0–0 | 5–1 | 5–0 | 0–2 | 6–1 |
| Esch | 0–3 | — | 1–6 | 0–1 | 1–2 | 0–4 | 0–3 | 0–1 | 1–1 | 2–3 | 0–2 | 0–1 | 0–3 | 0–2 |
| F91 Dudelange | 0–0 | 4–0 | — | 4–3 | 3–2 | 2–0 | 4–2 | 3–2 | 2–0 | 4–0 | 7–0 | 3–2 | 2–1 | 4–0 |
| Fola Esch | 6–3 | 9–0 | 2–3 | — | 4–1 | 1–1 | 1–1 | 2–4 | 3–3 | 2–1 | 7–1 | 3–1 | 3–2 | 1–1 |
| Hostert | 2–1 | 3–1 | 2–1 | 2–0 | — | 1–2 | 1–3 | 1–6 | 2–1 | 3–1 | 1–1 | 1–2 | 2–2 | 1–3 |
| Jeunesse Esch | 3–1 | 2–1 | 3–1 | 3–3 | 4–2 | — | 4–2 | 0–3 | 1–2 | 3–0 | 1–1 | 4–0 | 3–3 | 4–1 |
| Mondorf-les-Bains | 2–0 | 3–0 | 0–2 | 0–1 | 0–0 | 0–0 | — | 0–0 | 4–2 | 1–1 | 1–1 | 3–1 | 4–3 | 3–2 |
| Progrès Niederkorn | 1–0 | 3–1 | 1–3 | 2–1 | 1–1 | 1–0 | 3–2 | — | 4–2 | 1–3 | 1–0 | 1–1 | 7–1 | 5–0 |
| Racing FC | 1–1 | 2–1 | 1–1 | 2–1 | 0–0 | 1–2 | 2–0 | 2–3 | — | 1–0 | 3–2 | 1–1 | 2–3 | 2–2 |
| RM Hamm Benfica | 0–1 | 3–1 | 1–3 | 2–5 | 2–0 | 2–1 | 0–0 | 1–2 | 0–3 | — | 2–0 | 1–1 | 2–0 | 1–2 |
| Rodange 91 | 2–1 | 1–0 | 1–2 | 0–3 | 0–0 | 1–3 | 0–1 | 0–4 | 2–2 | 2–2 | — | 2–3 | 2–1 | 1–1 |
| UNA Strassen | 2–2 | 2–1 | 1–4 | 0–4 | 3–0 | 0–3 | 2–1 | 0–6 | 0–1 | 6–0 | 2–2 | — | 4–2 | 1–4 |
| Union Titus Pétange | 0–2 | 4–1 | 1–3 | 2–3 | 1–2 | 1–0 | 1–1 | 1–3 | 2–1 | 0–1 | 1–1 | 2–1 | — | 2–1 |
| Victoria Rosport | 1–2 | 1–2 | 0–4 | 2–1 | 1–3 | 3–1 | 1–3 | 2–5 | 0–2 | 1–1 | 1–1 | 4–1 | 0–2 | — |

Source: UEFA, Soccerway
Legend: Blue = home team win; Yellow = draw; Red = away team win.

== Relegation play-offs ==
A play-off (on neutral ground) will be played between the twelfth-placed team in the 2017–18 Luxembourg National Division and the third-placed team in the 2017–18 Luxembourg Division of Honour for one place in the 2018–19 Luxembourg National Division.

25 May 2018
19:30

| Victoria Rosport | 2–0 | UN Käerjéng 97 |
|---|---|---|
| Lascak 84'; Heinz 89' |

Stade Achille Hammerel, Verlorenkost

== Top goalscorers ==
| Rank | Player | Club | Goals |
|---|---|---|---|
| 1 | (Luxembourg) David Turpel | F91 Dudelange | 33 |
| 2 | (Armenia) Aleksandre Karapetian | Progrès Niederkorn | 28 |
| 3 | (Morocco) Samir Hadji | Fola Esch | 22 |
| 4 | (France) Nicolas Perez | Differdange 03 | 17 |
| 5 | (Senegal) Momar N'Diaye | Jeunesse Esch | 15 |
| 6 | (France) Simon Banza | UT Pétange | 13 |
| 7 | (France) Julien Jahier | Racing FC | 11 |
| 7 | (Luxembourg) Ryan Klapp | Fola Esch | 11 |
| 7 | (Algeria) Eddire Mokrani | RM Hamm Benfica | 11 |
| 10 | (Luxembourg) Edis Agović | UNA Strassen | 10 |

== See also ==
- 2017–18 Luxembourg Cup
