= 2018–19 Luxembourg National Division =

Luxembourg National Division
- Season: 2018–19
- Dates: 5 August 2018 – 19 May 2019
- Champions: F91 Dudelange
- Relegated: RM Hamm Benfica; Rumelange
- Champions League: F91 Dudelange
- Europa League: Fola Esch; Jeunesse Esch
- Matches: 182
- Goals: 592 (3.25 per match)

The 2018–19 Luxembourg National Division was the 105th season of top-flight association football in Luxembourg. The season began on 5 August 2018 and ended on 19 May 2019.

F91 Dudelange were the defending champions from the previous season.

== Teams ==
Rodange 91 and Esch were relegated at the end of the previous season. Etzella Ettelbruck and Rumelange joined the league this season after earning promotion from the Luxembourg Division of Honour.

Locations of the 2018–19 Luxembourg National Division teams

=== Stadia and locations ===
Team	Location	Stadium	Capacity
Differdange 03	Differdange	Stade Parc des Sports	2,400
F91 Dudelange	Dudelange	Stade Jos Nosbaum	2,558
Fola Esch	Esch-sur-Alzette	Stade Émile Mayrisch	3,826
FC Etzella Ettelbruck	Ettelbruck	Stade Am Deich	2,020
Hostert	Hostert	Stade Jos Becker	1,500
Jeunesse Esch	Esch-sur-Alzette	Stade de la Frontière	5,400
Mondorf-les-Bains	Mondorf-les-Bains	Stade Jeannot Mayrisch	3,600
Progrès Niederkorn	Niederkorn	Stade Jos Haupert	2,800
Racing FC	Luxembourg City	Stade Josy Barthel	9,000
US Rumelange	Rumelange	Stade Municipal	2,950
RM Hamm Benfica	Hamm, Luxembourg City	Terrain de Football Cents	2,800
UNA Strassen	Strassen	Stade Municipal de Strassen	2,000
Union Titus Pétange	Pétange	Stade Municipal de Pétange	2,400
Victoria Rosport	Rosport	VictoriArena	1,000

Source: Scoresway

== League table ==
Pos	Team	Pld	W	D	L	GF	GA	GD	Pts	Qualification or relegation
1	F91 Dudelange (C)	26	18	5	3	72	33	+39	59	Qualification for the Champions League first qualifying round
2	Fola Esch	26	15	5	6	65	28	+37	50	Qualification for the Europa League first qualifying round
3	Jeunesse Esch	26	14	6	6	46	30	+16	48	Qualification for the Europa League first qualifying round
4	Progrès Niederkorn	26	13	5	8	45	35	+10	44	Qualification for the Europa League preliminary round
5	Differdange 03	26	13	5	8	35	33	+2	44	
6	Racing FC	26	11	6	9	42	31	+11	39	
7	UNA Strassen	26	12	3	11	46	43	+3	39	
8	Union Titus Pétange	26	11	4	11	38	43	−5	37	
9	Mondorf-les-Bains	26	10	5	11	39	39	0	35	
10	Etzella Ettelbruck	26	7	7	12	31	44	−13	28	
11	Victoria Rosport	26	7	7	12	33	49	−16	28	
12	Hostert (O)	26	7	4	15	37	58	−21	25	Qualification for the relegation play-offs
13	RM Hamm Benfica (R)	26	5	4	17	29	50	−21	19	Relegation to the Luxembourg Division of Honour
14	Rumelange (R)	26	4	4	18	34	76	−42	16	Relegation to the Luxembourg Division of Honour

Source: UEFA, Soccerway
Rules for classification: 1) Points; 2) Goal difference; 3) Matches won; 4) Head-to-head points; 5) Head-to-head goal difference; 6) Head-to-head goals scored; 7) Play-off.
(C) Champions; (O) Play-off winners; (R) Relegated

== Positions by round ==
The table lists the positions of teams after each week of matches. In order to preserve chronological evolvements, any postponed matches are not included to the round at which they were originally scheduled, but added to the full round they were played immediately afterwards.

Team ╲ Round	1	2	3	4	5	6	7	8	9	10	11	12	13	14	15	16	17	18	19	20	21	22	23	24	25	26
F91 Dudelange	2	7	5	8	11	6	4	4	4	3	2	3	3	3	2	1	1	1	1	1	1	1	1	1	1	1
Fola Esch	11	13	13	13	9	12	7	7	6	5	4	2	2	1	1	2	3	2	2	2	2	2	2	2	2	2
Jeunesse Esch	3	1	1	1	1	1	1	1	1	1	1	1	1	2	3	3	4	3	4	3	3	3	3	3	3	3
Progrès Niederkorn	9	6	10	10	7	4	5	5	7	6	6	5	4	4	4	4	2	4	3	4	5	5	4	5	5	4
Differdange 03	4	2	4	2	2	2	2	3	3	4	3	4	5	6	7	8	8	8	7	6	4	4	5	4	4	5
Racing FC	8	10	6	3	3	3	3	2	2	2	5	6	6	5	5	6	6	6	5	7	6	6	6	6	6	6
UNA Strassen	1	4	3	5	4	9	12	12	13	13	12	10	8	8	8	7	7	7	6	5	7	7	7	7	7	7
Union Titus Pétange	6	3	2	4	8	5	6	6	5	7	7	7	7	7	6	5	5	5	8	8	8	8	9	9	9	8
Mondorf-les-Bains	13	8	12	6	6	10	11	11	10	11	9	8	9	10	10	10	10	9	9	9	9	9	8	8	8	9
Etzella Ettelbruck	7	11	8	12	5	8	9	8	9	8	8	9	10	9	9	9	9	10	11	11	11	11	11	11	11	10
Victoria Rosport	10	12	9	11	13	14	10	9	8	9	10	11	11	11	11	11	11	11	10	10	10	10	10	10	10	11
Hostert	14	14	14	14	14	11	13	13	11	10	11	12	12	12	12	13	12	12	12	12	12	12	12	12	12	12
RM Hamm Benfica	12	5	7	9	12	7	8	10	12	12	13	13	13	13	13	12	13	13	13	13	13	13	13	13	13	13
Rumelange	5	9	11	7	10	13	14	14	14	14	14	14	14	14	14	14	14	14	14	14	14	14	14	14	14	14

Leader and Champions League first qualifying round
Europa League first qualifying round
Europa League preliminary round
Relegation play-offs
Relegation to the Luxembourg Division of Honour

== Results ==
Each team played every other team in the league home-and-away for a total of 26 matches each.

Home \ Away	DIF	ETZ	DUD	FOL	HOS	JEU	MON	PRO	RAC	RMH	RUM	UNA	UTP	VIC
Differdange 03	—	2–0	0–4	0–4	3–1	2–0	2–0	2–0	1–0	4–0	3–2	1–3	1–5	3–0
Etzella Ettelbruck	1–0	—	0–2	2–2	0–1	1–1	2–0	1–1	1–1	0–3	2–1	0–2	2–1	0–0
F91 Dudelange	0–2	4–2	—	1–1	4–1	1–3	1–4	4–1	2–0	5–3	2–2	1–1	6–1	2–0
Fola Esch	3–0	6–0	1–2	—	4–1	2–5	5–0	2–1	3–0	2–0	7–0	1–1	3–0	1–1
Hostert	1–1	4–0	3–4	2–3	—	2–3	1–1	0–1	0–4	1–0	4–2	1–6	0–3	0–3
Jeunesse Esch	0–0	1–0	0–3	3–1	3–0	—	1–2	1–1	1–0	4–0	3–1	1–2	1–1	1–1
Mondorf-les-Bains	0–0	1–0	1–2	2–0	2–2	0–2	—	1–0	0–3	2–2	4–3	2–2	4–1	4–0
Progrès Niederkorn	2–0	4–3	0–2	1–1	1–1	5–0	2–1	—	2–0	1–0	3–0	2–0	1–0	3–3
Racing FC	3–3	0–3	1–1	2–1	2–0	0–1	3–0	5–0	—	1–0	2–2	4–1	4–1	2–2
RM Hamm Benfica	1–1	1–1	1–3	1–2	1–2	0–2	2–1	1–2	2–0	—	0–1	1–3	2–2	1–3
Rumelange	1–2	3–5	2–9	0–3	0–4	1–1	1–3	2–1	2–1	1–3	—	0–2	0–0	3–2
UNA Strassen	2–0	2–1	0–2	0–2	3–4	0–4	1–0	2–4	1–2	0–3	4–1	—	2–1	4–0
Union Titus Pétange	0–1	1–1	1–3	2–1	2–1	3–2	1–0	1–5	0–1	3–0	2–1	3–1	—	2–0
Victoria Rosport	0–1	0–3	2–2	1–4	2–0	1–2	0–4	2–1	1–1	3–1	4–2	2–1	0–1	—

Source: UEFA, Soccerway
Legend: Blue = home team win; Yellow = draw; Red = away team win.

== Relegation play-offs ==
A play-off was played between the twelfth-placed team in the 2018–19 Luxembourg National Division and the third-placed team in the 2018–19 Luxembourg Division of Honour for one place in the 2019–20 Luxembourg National Division.

24 May 2019
20:00

Hostert	2–0	Swift Hesperange
Peters 40'; Serwy 41'	Report

Stade rue Henri Dunant
Attendance: 2,058
Referee: Ivo Torres Rocha

US Hostert remained in 2019–20 Luxembourg National Division and FC Swift Hesperange remained in 2019–20 Luxembourg Division d'Honneur

== Top goalscorers ==
Rank	Player	Club	Goals
1	(Morocco) Samir Hadji	Fola Esch	23
2	(France) Mickaël Jager	UNA Strassen	14
2	(Luxembourg) David Turpel	F91 Dudelange	14
4	(France) Marwane Benamra	Mondorf-les-Bains	13
4	(Portugal) Bertino Cabral	RM Hamm Benfica	13
6	(Germany) Alexandar Biedermann	Victoria Rosport	12
7	(Bosnia and Herzegovina) Sanel Ibrahimović	F91 Dudelange	11
7	(Armenia) Aleksandre Karapetian	Progrès Niederkorn	11
9	(Luxembourg) Stefano Bensi	Fola Esch	10
9	(Luxembourg) Kevin Holtz	Etzella Ettelbruck	10
9	(France) Corenthyn Lavie	US Hostert	10

== See also ==
- 2018–19 Luxembourg Cup
- 2018–19 Luxembourg Division of Honour
