= Youn Czekanowicz =

Luxembourgish footballer (born 2000)

Youn Czekanowicz (born 8 August 2000) is a Luxembourgish footballer who plays as a goalkeeper for FC Wiltz 71.

== Personal life ==
Czekanowicz is the son of Luxembourgish footballer Mike Czekanowicz. He is of Polish descent.

== Career ==
Czekanowicz joined the youth academy of German side Alemannia Aachen at the age of twelve.

Czekanowicz started his senior career with Luxembourgish side FC Progrès Niederkorn. After that, he was sent on loan to Luxembourgish side FC UNA Strassen. In 2021, he signed for Luxembourgish side FC Swift Hesperange.

== Style of play ==
Czekanowicz has been described as "very comfortable with both feet".
