= Marc Thomé =

Luxembourgish footballer

Personal information
- Date of birth: 4 November 1963 (age 62)
- Position: Midfielder

Team information
- Current team: Victoria Rosport (manager)

Senior career*
| Years | Team | Apps | (Gls) |
| 1985–1986 | Red Boys Differdange | | |
| 1989–1992 | Jeunesse Esch | | |
| 1992–1997 | CS Grevenmacher | | |
| 1997–1999 | F91 Dudelange | | |

International career
| 1986–1994 | Luxembourg | 10 | (0) |

Managerial career
- 1999–2007: CS Oberkorn
- 2007–2008: US Rumelange
- 2010–2014: CS Grevenmacher
- 2014–2016: Differdange 03
- 2017–2019: Jeunesse Esch
- 2019–: Victoria Rosport
- * Club domestic league appearances and goals

Marc Thomé (born 4 November 1963) is a Luxembourgish football manager and former player who played as a midfielder.
