= Roland Schaack =

Luxembourgish footballer

Personal information
- Date of birth: 7 July 1973 (age 53)
- Position: Defender

Senior career*
Years	Team	Apps	(Gls)
1991–2003	Jeunesse Esch		
2003–2004	US Rumelange		

International career
- Luxembourg U21
2000–2001	Luxembourg	5	(0)

Managerial career
- 2008–2009: Differdange 03
- 2010–2012: Käerjéng 97
- * Club domestic league appearances and goals

Roland Schaack (born 7 July 1973) is a retired Luxembourgish football defender and later manager.
