= Luxembourg 1. Division =

Association football league in Luxembourg

- Country: Luxembourg
- Confederation: UEFA
- Divisions: 2
- Number of clubs: 32
- Level on pyramid: 3
- Promotion to: Luxembourg Division of Honour
- Relegation to: 2. Division
- Domestic cup(s): Luxembourg Cup; Coupe FLF
- Current champions: Series 1: Avenir Beggen; Series 2: URB

Luxembourg 1. Division (Luxembourgish: 1. Divisioun) is the third level in the league system of Luxembourg football.

== The competition ==
There are 32 clubs in 1. Division, divided in two groups of 16 teams. At the end of each season the three lowest placed teams of each group are relegated to 2. Division and the six winning teams from the two 3. Division leagues are promoted in their place. The top team in each 1. Division group is promoted to Luxembourg Division of Honour and the two lowest placed teams from Luxembourg Division of Honour are relegated in their place. The second placed teams in each 1. Division group play a promotion/relegation play-off against the third and fourth lowest teams in the Luxembourg Division of Honour.

== Current clubs ==
The teams in the 2026–27 season are split into two Series.

Series 1
| Club | Location | 2025–26 position |
|---|---|---|
| Alisontia Steinsel | Steinsel | 16th (Division of Honour) ▼ |
| Blo-Wäiss Medernach | Medernach | 9th |
| Daring Echternach | Echternach | 9th (1. Division Series 2) |
| 72 Erpeldange | Erpeldange | 1st (2. Division Series 1) ▲ |
| Folschette | Folschette | 3rd (2. Division Series 1) ▲ |
| Green Boys | Harlange | 2nd (2. Division Series 1) ▲ |
| Hosingen | Hosingen | 11th |
| Jeunesse Gilsdorf | Gilsdorf | 12th |
| Jeunesse Schieren | Schieren | 2nd |
| Jeunesse Useldange | Useldange | 6th |
| Käerch | Koerich | 10th |
| Minerva Lintgen | Lintgen | 5th |
| Norden 02 | Weiswampach | 4th |
| Olympia Christnach-Waldbillig | Christnach | 4th (2. Division Series 1) ▲ |
| Sporting Mertzig | Mertzig | 8th |
| Young Boys Diekirch | Diekirch | 7th |

Series 2
| Club | Location | 2025–26 position |
|---|---|---|
| Blo Waiss Itzig | Itzig | 3rd |
| Grevenmacher | Grevenmacher | 2nd |
| Jeunesse Biwer | Biwer | 3rd (2. Division Series 2) ▲ |
| Kehlen | Kehlen | 3rd (1. Division Series 1) |
| Kopstal 33 | Kopstal | 8th |
| Moutfort-Medingen | Moutfort | 2nd (2. Division Series 2) ▲ |
| Munsbach | Munsbach | 10th |
| AS Red Black Luxembourg | Luxembourg | 1st (2. Division Series 2) ▲ |
| Red Star Merl-Belair | Merl | 12th |
| Sanem | Sanem | 7th |
| Schengen | Remerschen | 11th |
| Schifflange 95 | Schifflange | 15th (Division of Honour) ▼ |
| Sporting Bertrange | Bertrange | 5th |
| Syra Mensdorf | Mensdorf | 4th |
| Union Mertert-Wasserbillig | Wasserbillig | 14th |
| Yellow Boys Weiler-la-Tour | Weiler-la-Tour | 6th |

== Previous winners ==
| Season | Serie 1 | Serie 2 |
|---|---|---|
| 1996–97 | FC Swift Hesperange | FC Tricolore Gasperich |
| 1997–98 | FC Koeppchen Wormeldange | UN Käerjéng 97 |
| 1998–99 | FCM Young Boys Diekirch | SC Tétange |
| 1999–2000 | FC Victoria Rosport | FC Mamer 32 |
| 2000–01 | Daring Echternach | AS Differdange |
| 2001–02 | FC Koeppchen Wormeldange | Schifflange 95 |
| 2002–03 | FC Minerva Lintgen | CS Fola Esch |
| 2003–04 | Union Mertert Wasserbillig | Daring Echternach |
| 2004–05 | FC Minerva Lintgen | FC Mamer 32 |
| 2005–06 | SC Steinfort | US Hostert |
| 2006–07 | FC Atert Bissen | FC Minerva Lintgen |
| 2007–08 | FC Flaxweiler-Beyren | FC Koeppchen Wormeldange |
| 2008–09 | Young Boys Diekirch | CS Oberkorn |
| 2009–10 | FC Green Boys 77 Harlange-Tarchamps | US Mondorf-les-Bains |
| 2010–11 | FF Norden 02 | FC UNA Strassen |
| 2011–12 | FC Alliance Äischdall | Sandweiler |
| 2012–13 | Marisca Mersch | Jeunesse Junglinster |
| 2013–14 | Mamer 32 | FC Mondercange |
| 2014–15 | FF Norden 02 | Union Remich/Bous |
| 2015–16 | FC Atert Bissen | US Esch |
| 2016–17 | Erpeldange 72 | Blue Boys Muhlenbach |
| 2017–18 | FC Atert Bissen | Jeunesse Junglinster |
| 2018–19 | Alisontia Steinsel | FC Mondercange |
| 2019–20 | Marisca Mersch | Berdenia Berbourg |
| 2020–21 | Lorentzweiler | Blo Waiss Itzig |
| 2021–22 | Jeunesse Schieren | CS Grevenmacher |
| 2022–23 | Lorentzweiler | Residence Walferdange |
| 2023–24 | FC Atert Bissen | Sandweiler |
| 2024–25 | Lorentzweiler | The Belval Belvaux |
| 2025–26 | Avenir Beggen | URB |
