= Sacha Rohmann =

Luxembourgish footballer

Personal information
- Date of birth: 3 August 1980 (age 46)
- Position: Defender

Senior career*
Years	Team	Apps	(Gls)
2000–2002	US Rumelange		
2002–2004	Jeunesse Esch		
2005–2010	US Rumelange		
2011–2012	CS Grevenmacher		

International career
2001–2002	Luxembourg	2	(0)
- * Club domestic league appearances and goals

Sacha Rohmann (born 3 August 1980) is a retired Luxembourgish football defender.
