= Bertrand Ketchanke =

Footballer (born 1980)

Personal information
- Date of birth: 14 June 1980 (age 46)
- Place of birth: Cameroon
- Position: Defender

Senior career*
Years	Team	Apps	(Gls)
–2001	Rennes	0	(0)
1999–2000	→ Reims (loan)		
2004	Scarborough	5	(1)
2005–2006	Institute		
2010	Borgo		
2012	BX Brussels	7	(0)
2013–2014	US Esch		
2014–2015	CS Pétange		
- FC Arlon

International career
2003	Mauritania	1	(0)
- * Club domestic league appearances and goals

Bertrand Ketchanke (born 14 June 1980) is a former professional footballer who is played as a defender. Born in Cameroon, he was a youth international for France and made one appearance for the Mauritania senior national team.

== Career ==
Ketchanke started his career with French Ligue 1 side Rennes. In 1999, he was sent on loan to Reims in the French third division. In 2004, Ketchanke signed for English fifth division side Scarborough. In 2005, he signed for Institute in Northern Ireland but left due to being threatened. In 2010, he signed for French club Borgo.

Before the second half of 2011–12, Ketchanke signed for BX Brussels in the Belgian third division. In 2013, he signed for Luxembourgish third division team US Esch. In 2014, he signed for CS Pétange in the Luxembourgish second division. In 2015, Ketchanke signed for Belgian outfit FC Arlon.
