= Bertino Cabral =

Portuguese footballer (born 1992)

Bertino João Cabral Barbosa (born 6 May 1992) is a Portuguese professional footballer who plays as a winger or striker.

== Early life ==
Cabral is a native of Oeiras, Portugal.

== Career ==
In 2018, Cabral was sent on loan to Luxembourgish side FC RM Hamm Benfica, where he scored three goals in his first three appearances.

In 2021, he signed for Luxembourgish side FC Differdange 03, where he was regarded as one of the club's most important players.

== Outside football ==
Cabral has worked in a hospital.

== Style of play ==
Cabral's preferred position is winger and he can operate as a striker.

== Personal life ==
Cabral has two older brothers.
