= Luxembourg 2. Division =

Association football league in Luxembourg

2. Division
- Country: Luxembourg
- Confederation: UEFA
- Number of clubs: 28
- Level on pyramid: 4
- Promotion to: 1. Division
- Relegation to: 3. Division
- Domestic cup(s): Luxembourg Cup; Coupe FLF
- Current champions: Serie 1: 72 Erpeldange; Serie 2: AS Red Black Luxembourg (2025–26)

The Luxembourg 2. Division (Luxembourgish: 2. Divisioun) is the fourth of the Luxembourg football league system. There are a total of 28 teams in the division, split into 2 Series.

== Current clubs ==
The teams in the 2026–27 season are split into two Series.

Serie 1
Club	Location	2025–26 position
Bastendorf 47	Bastendorf	14th (1. Division Series 1) ▼
Biekerech	Beckerich	4th (3. Division) ▲
Boevange-Attert	Boevange	8th
Bourscheid	Michelau	9th
SC Ell	Ell	12th
Kiischpelt Wilwerwiltz	Pintsch	2nd (3. Division) ▲
Orania Vianden	Vianden	5th
Pratzerthal-Redange	Redange	10th
Racing Heiderscheid-Eschdorf	Eschdorf	13th
Racing Troisvierges	Troisvierges	7th
Rambrouch	Rambrouch	11th
Reisdorf	Reisdorf	1st (3. Division) ▲
Rupensia Lusitanos Larochette	Larochette	13th (1. Division Series 1) ▼
Wincrange	Wincrange	16th (1. Division Series 1) ▼

Serie 2
Club	Location	2025–26 position
Alliance Äischdall	Hobscheid	15th (1. Division Series 1) ▼
Les Aiglons Dalheim	Dalheim	11th
Berdorf-Consdorf	Consdorf	6th (2. Division Series 1)
ES Clemency	Clemency	7th
Ehlerange	Ehlerange	8th
Jeunesse Junglinster	Junglinster	16th (1. Division Series 2) ▼
Minière Lasauvage	Lasauvage	6th
CS Oberkorn	Oberkorn	13th (1. Division Series 2) ▼
Red Boys Aspelt	Aspelt	12th
US Sandweiler	Sandweiler	15th (1. Division Series 2) ▼
Schouweiler	Schouweiler	9th
Steinfort	Steinfort	10th
Tricolore Gasperich	Luxembourg	4th
Union Kayl-Tétange	Tétange	5th

== Previous winners ==
Season	Serie 1	Serie 2	Serie 3	Serie 4
1996–97	FC Wiltz 71 II	FC Marisca Mersch	F91 Dudelange II	CS Oberkorn
1997–98	Jeunesse Schieren	FC Minerva Lintgen	Red Star Merl-Belair	ES Clemency
1998–99	FC 72 Erpeldange	FC UNA Strassen	US Berdorf-Consdorf 01	Yellow Boys Weiler-la-Tour
1999–2000	FC Brouch	FC Lorentzweiler	AS Differdange	
2000–01	AS Colmarberg	Berdenia Berbourg	CS Oberkorn	
2001–02	FC 72 Erpeldange	US Hostert	Olympique Eischen	
2002–03	FC Simmern Iska Boys	US Mondorf	FC Blue Boys Muhlenbach	
2003–04	AS Rupensia Lusitanos Larochette	US Sandweiler	SC Bettembourg	
2004–05	Jeunesse Schieren	Tricolore Gasperich	Red Star Merl-Belair	
2005–06	FC Atert Bissen	US Mondorf	CS Hobscheid	
2006–07	Boevange-Attert	FC Flaxweiler-Beyren	FC Ehlerange	
2007–08	AS Wincrange	FC Syra Mensdorf	Sporting Bertrange	
2008–09	FF Norden 02	ES Clemency		
2009–10	AS Hosingen	FC Schifflange 95		
2010–11	FC Lorentzweiler	Jeunesse Junglinster		
2011–12	Boevange-Attert	FC Rodange 91		
2012–13	FC Kehlen	CS Sanem		
2013–14	Jeunesse Schieren	FC Schifflange 95		
2014–15	FC Alisontia Steinsel	FC Munsbach		
2015–16	Blo-Wäiss Medernach	CS Sanem		
2016–17	SC Steinfort	FC Red Boys Aspelt		
2017–18	Jeunesse Useldange	Union Remich/Bous		
2018–19	US Feulen	FC Résidence Walferdange		
2019–20	Jeunesse Useldange	Blo Waiss Itzig		
2020–21	AS Wincrange	FC The Belval Belvaux		
2021–22	FC Pratzerthal-Redange	FC The Belval Belvaux		
2022–23	Wincrange	Munsbach		
2023–24	Alliance Äischdall	Sanem		
2024–25	Minerva Lintgen	Kopstal 33		
2025–26	72 Erpeldange	AS Red Black Luxembourg		
