= Luxembourg football league system =

Series of interconnected leagues for club football

Men's Football in Luxembourg is organised in a 5-tier league system, as detailed in the table below.

Level	League		Promotion/Relegation
1	National Division; 16 clubs		2 to 4 clubs
2	Division of Honour; 16 clubs		2 to 4 clubs 2 to 4 clubs
3	1. Division Serie 1; 16 clubs	1. Division Serie 2; 16 clubs	2 to 4 clubs 4 to 8 clubs
4	2. Division Serie 1; 14 clubs	2. Division Serie 2; 14 clubs	4 to 8 clubs 2 to 4 clubs
5	3. Division; 8 clubs		2 to 4 clubs

Women's football is organised in a 3-tier league system, as detailed in the table below.

Level	League	Teams
1	Ligue 1	10 clubs
2	Ligue 2	10 clubs
3	Ligue 3	Up to 14 clubs per District (Series)
