= Luxembourg 3. Division =

Association football league in Luxembourg

3. Division
- Country: Luxembourg
- Confederation: UEFA
- Number of clubs: 8
- Level on pyramid: 5
- Promotion to: 2. Division
- Domestic cup(s): Luxembourg Cup; Coupe FLF
- Current champions: Reisdorf (2025–26)

The Luxembourg 3. Division (Luxembourgish: 3. Divisioun) is the fifth tier of the Luxembourg football league system. There are a total of 9 teams in the division. Unlike the 1. Division and 2. Division, that comprise two separate series that run parallel throughout the season, the 3. Division only has a single series. The two teams that finish first and second are automatically promoted to the 2. Division. The teams that finish third and fourth enter the single-match promotion playoffs against the teams finishing second last in both series of the 2. Division. These matches are played at the end of the regular season at the end of May/beginning of June at neutral grounds, chosen to be equally distant from both clubs' home grounds. The winners of the playoff match get to play in the higher division the following season.

== Current clubs ==
The clubs competing in the 2026–27 season are listed below.

Club	Location	2025–26 position
Brouch	Brouch	3rd
Claravallis Clervaux	Clervaux	14th (2. Division Series 1) ▼
Colmarberg	Colmar-Berg	6th
US Esch	Esch-sur-Alzette	13th (2. Division Series 2) ▼
Excelsior Grevels	Grevels	8th
Les Ardoisiers Perlé	Perlé	7th
Luna Oberkorn	Oberkorn	5th
Noertzange HF	Noertzange	14th (2. Division Series 2) ▼

== Previous winners ==
Season	Winners
2005–06	Jeunesse Useldange
2006–07	Moutfort-Medingen
2007–08	Olympia Christnach-Waldbillig
2008–09	Rambrouch
2009–10	Blo-Wäiss Medernach
2010–11	Boevange-Attert
2011–12	Excelsior Grevels
2012–13	Jeunesse Gilsdorf
2013–14	Jeunesse Useldange
2014–15	Les Ardoisiers Perlé
2015–16	Biekerech
2016–17	Reisdorf
2017–18	Les Ardoisiers Perlé
2018–19	Reisdorf
2019–20	Folschette
2020–21	Rupensia Lusitanos Larochette
2021–22	Rupensia Lusitanos Larochette
2022–23	Racing Troisvierges
2023–24	Racing Heiderscheid-Eschdorf
2024–25	CS Bourscheid
2025–26	Reisdorf
