= FC Green Boys 77 Harlange-Tarchamps =

Association football club in Luxembourg

Green Boys 77
- Full name: Football Club Green Boys 77 Harlange-Tarchamps
- Founded: 19 June 1977; 49 years ago
- Ground: Terrain am Duerf, Harlange; Stade Um Haf, Harlange
- Capacity: 1,100
- Chairman: Alain Lonsdorfer
- Manager: Filipe Constantino
- League: 1. Division Series 1
- 2025–26: 2. Division Series 1, 2nd of 14 (promoted)
- Website: http://www.greenboys.net/

Football Club Green-Boys 77 Harlange-Tarchamps is a football club based in Harlange, in north-western Luxembourg. They play their home games at Stade "Am Duerf" and compete in the 1. Division Series 1, the third tier of Luxembourgish football.

== History ==
The FC Green-Boys was formed after a vote on 14 May 1977 by members of two teams, F.C. Harlange 1963 and F.C. Tarwat Tarchamps 1948, the result of which was the merger. Their first chairman was Schmitt Armand from Tarchamps. The newly formed team started playing in the Luxembourg 3. Division.

== Promotions and relegations ==
- 1979: Promotion to Luxembourg 2. Division
- 1981: Relegation to Luxembourg 3. Division
- 1988: Promotion to Luxembourg 2. Division
- 1991: Promotion to Luxembourg 1. Division
- 1993: Promotion to Luxembourg Division of Honour
- 1994: Relegation to Luxembourg 1. Division
- 1995: Relegation to Luxembourg 2. Division
- 1997: Promotion to Luxembourg 1. Division
- 2010: Promotion to Luxembourg Division of Honour
- 2011: Relegation to Luxembourg 1. Division
- 2015: Relegation to Luxembourg 2. Division
