= CS Oberkorn =

Association football club in Luxembourg

- Full name: Cercle Sportif Oberkorn
- Nickname: Oberkorn
- Founded: 1930; 96 years ago
- Ground: Terrain Woiwer, Differdange
- Capacity: 1,000
- President: Yves Bechet
- Manager: Toninho Marques
- League: 2. Division Series 2
- 2025–26: 1. Division Series 2, 13th of 16 (relegated)
Home colours	Away colours

Cercle Sportif Oberkorn is an association football club based in Oberkorn, in south-west Luxembourg. They play in the 2. Division Series 2, the fourth tier of Luxembourgish football.
