= FC UNA Strassen =

Association football club in Luxembourg

Coordinates: 49.617859°N 6.071670°E

UNA Strassen
- Full name: Football Club Union Athlétique Strassen
- Founded: 13 February 1922; 104 years ago
- Ground: Stade An de Millewisen
- Capacity: 2,500
- Chairman: Luc Hilger
- Manager: Jérémy Deichelbohrer
- League: National Division
- 2025–26: National Division, 4th of 16
- Website: www.fcuna-strassen.lu
Home colours	Away colours

UNA Strassen, founded in 1922, is a football club based in Strassen, Luxembourg. The club currently competes in the National Division, the top tier of Luxembourgish football.

The club plays its home matches at the Stade An de Millewisen, which was inaugurated on 27 October 2025 during a match against Rodange 91. Prior to this, the team played at the Complexe Sportif Jean Wirtz.

== History ==
=== Early years (1922 - 1999) ===
The club was founded in 1922 as Union Athlétique Strassen (UNA Strassen). The following year, UNA Strassen became affiliated with the Luxembourg Football Federation.

Playing a modest role in the lower divisions of Luxembourgish football, UNA Strassen would see a halt in their journey due to the occupation of Luxembourg (1940–45) during World War II. After the liberation of Luxembourg in September 1945, the Luxembourg Football Federation declared all results of competitions under the Nazi Regime void.

The 1998–99 2. Division season was the take-off season for UNA Strassen. They topped Serie 2 of the Division (the second of four groups), and so earning themselves promotion from the 4th tier to the 3rd tier.

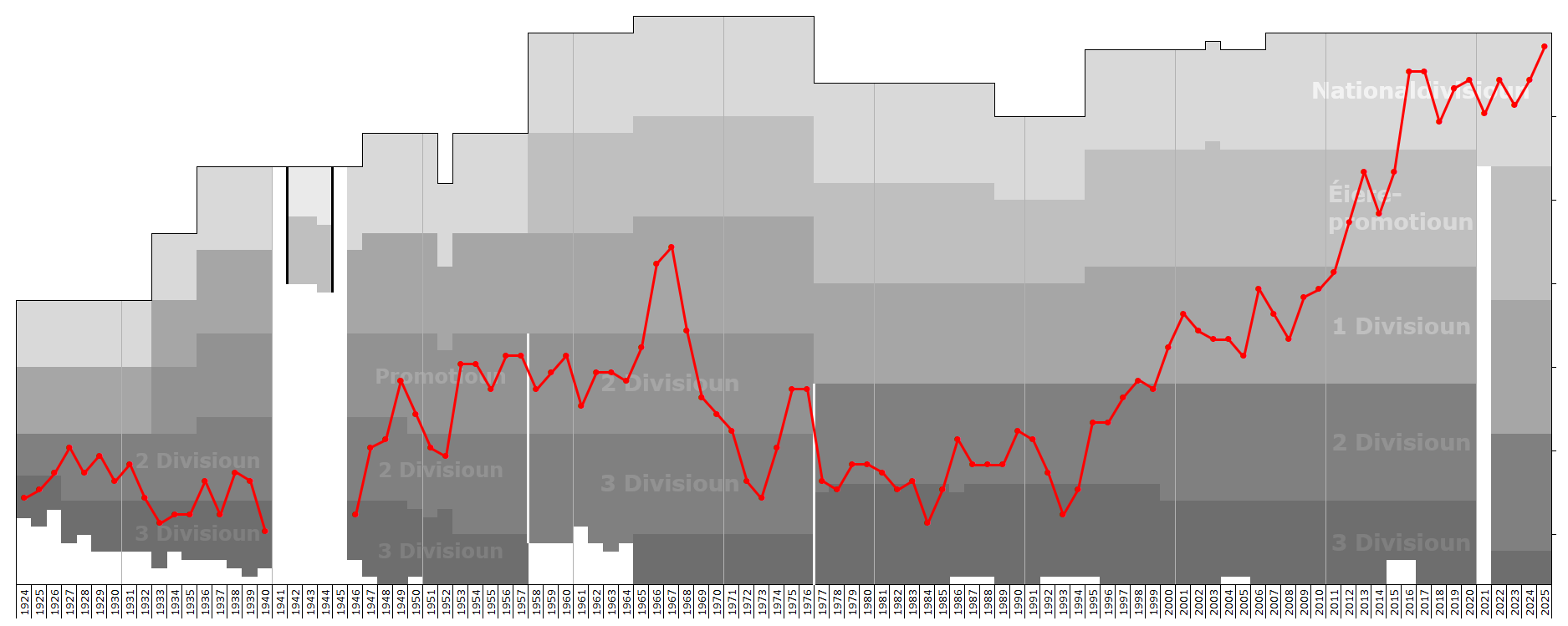
Historical league performance chart of UNA Strassen

=== Post-2000 successes (2000 - ) ===
The wait for another promotion was at last ended just over 10 years after their pre-millennium success. In the 2010–11 1. Division, UNA Strassen secured top spot of Serie 2 (the second of two groups), and in turn gaining promotion once more, this time to the Division of Honour (2nd tier).

Their time in the 2nd Division was short-lived, with the side taking only 4 years to reach the top flight from there, gaining promotion to the 2015–16 National Division after finishing third in the 2014-15 Division of Honour and winning their playoff match.

UNA Strassen recorded five top-10 finishes in the Luxembourg National Division over a five-season period. During the 2023–24 season. They had also been performing in domestic competition, going out in the Semi-Final of the 2023–24 Luxembourg Cup to FC Swift Hesperange 2-0. Qualification for European competition (as discussed below) that same season really established them as one of a handful of prominent sides in the Luxembourgish footballing world.

After the conclusion of the 2023–24 Luxembourg National Division, UNA Strassen qualified for European Football for their first time, qualifying for the 2024–25 Conference League despite finishing 6th (outside of the qualifying spots which are 1st-3rd + the Luxembourg Cup winners). This was due to Swift Hesperange and Jeunesse Esch (two other clubs who play in the National Division) being denied their UEFA Pro Licenses.

The end of the 2024–25 BGL Ligue, saw UNA Strassen achieve their highest ever position in the Luxembourgish top-flight, finishing in 2nd place. This meant that the side qualified for European football for the second time ever, the first time being the previous season. This season however, they qualified for the 2025–26 Conference League 2nd Qualifying Round., instead of the 1st Qualifying Round the previous season. Not only this but one of their forwards, Matheus (Nogueira de Souza), was top scorer in the league.

Before the 2026–27 season, the club announced Jérémy Deichelbohrer as their new first team manager.

== European competitions ==
UNA Strassen has qualified for European competition twice, both times being qualified for the Conference League. They qualified for the 2024-25 edition, going out in the first qualifying round to Kuopion Palloseura (0-5); UNA Strassen also qualified for the 2025–26 edition, facing Dundee United in the second qualifying round, only to lose 0-2.

Competition	P	W	D	L	F	A
Conference League	8	2	1	5	3	12

Season	Competition	Round	Opponent	1st Leg	2nd Leg	Agg
2024–25 Conference League		Q1	(Finland) KuPS	0–0 (H)	0–5 (A)	0–5
2025–26 Conference League		Q2	(Scotland) Dundee United	0–1 (A)	0–1 (H)	0–2
2026–27 Conference League		Q1	(San Marino) La Fiorita	1–0 (H)	2–0 (A)	3–0
2026–27 Conference League		Q2	(Serbia) Partizan	0–4 (A)	0–1 (H)	0–5

== Best performances ==
UNA Strassen has played in several different competitions, both on a national and a continental scale.

National competitions	Continental competitions
Luxembourg National Division: Runner-Up (2024–25)	UEFA Conference League: 2nd Qualifying Round (2025–26)
Luxembourg Cup: Semi-Finals (2023–24)	

== Current squad ==
As of 10 September 2026

Note: Flags indicate national team as defined under FIFA eligibility rules; some limited exceptions apply. Players may hold more than one non-FIFA nationality.

No.	Pos.	Nation	Player
3	DF	BEL	Kino Delorge
5	DF	SEN	Galaye Gueye
6	MF	MNE	Eldin Rastoder
7	FW	BRA	Matheus
8	MF	LUX	Jimmy Goncalves
9	MF	FRA	Valentin Eysseric
11	FW	LUX	Omar Natami
14	DF	LUX	Alexandre Sacras
15	FW	CMR	Harisson Djonkep
17	MF	POR	João Teixeira
18	MF	LUX	David Dadashev
20	DF	LUX	Alen Agovic
21	GK	GER	Jayden Kuhn
22	GK	POR	Diogo Garrido

No.	Pos.	Nation	Player
23	DF	LUX	Eric Brandenburger
25	DF	LUX	Lukas Sever
27	DF	GUI	Lamine Toure
28	MF	FRA	Valentin Steinmetz
34	DF	LUX	Tim Hall
39	DF	FRA	Aniss El Hriti
44	FW	SEN	Babou Seye
67	GK	FRA	Koray Ozcan
73	MF	LUX	Adrian Ahmetxhekaj
90	FW	FRA	Nicolas Perez
93	FW	ERI	Abel Teklehaimanot
94	MF	FRA	Daryl Myre
99	GK	LUX	Ivan Marques
-	DF	FRA	Yassine Dridi

=== Out on loan ===
Note: Flags indicate national team as defined under FIFA eligibility rules; some limited exceptions apply. Players may hold more than one non-FIFA nationality.

No.	Pos.	Nation	Player
88	FW	BEL	Benjamin Romeyns (at Wiltz 71 until 30 June 2027)
