= US Hostert =

Association football club in Luxembourg

Hostert
- Full name: Football Club Union Sportive Hostert A.s.b.l.
- Founded: 24 March 1946; 80 years ago
- Ground: Stade Jos Becker, Hostert, Niederanven
- Capacity: 1,500
- Chairman: Jacques Wolter
- Manager: Roland Schaack
- League: National Division
- 2025–26: National Division, 9th of 16
- Website: http://www.ushostert.lu/

Football Club Union Sportive Hostert is a football club based in Hostert, Niederanven, in central Luxembourg. In 2011, the club was promoted to the highest tier for the first time in its history.

== Honours ==
Historical chart of the club's league performance

- Luxembourg Cup
  - Runners-up (1): 2018

== Current squad ==
As of 15 September, 2026

Note: Flags indicate national team as defined under FIFA eligibility rules; some limited exceptions apply. Players may hold more than one non-FIFA nationality.

No.	Pos.	Nation	Player
1	GK	FRA	Patricio Sancho
7	DF	LUX	Adriano L'Abbate
8	MF	SMN	Yanis Montantin
9	FW	FRA	Djibril Dianessy
10	MF	FRA	Sinan Altun
11	MF	GER	Volkan Ballıçalıoğlu
12	DF	FRA	Alexis Drinka
14	MF	SUI	Alan Rodriguez
17	FW	FRA	Diogo Fernandes
19	MF	LUX	Evann Mendes
20	MF	LUX	Cédric Baiverlin
21	MF	LUX	Yoann Ribeiro-Helten

No.	Pos.	Nation	Player
22	DF	LUX	Loris Bernardy
24	MF	FRA	Keliano Tavares
25	DF	FRA	Nathan Fuakala
28	DF	LUX	Bryan Almeida Borges
30	MF	ESP	Gabriel Corberán
44	DF	TUN	Maroine Mihoubi
45	DF	LUX	Luca Cungs
67	MF	LUX	Donat Ahmeti
70	FW	LUX	Michael Omosanya (on loan from Jeunesse Esch)
97	FW	FRA	Kévin Quinol
99	GK	LUX	Finn Seligson
-	GK	FRA	Lylian Parjouet

=== Out on loan ===
Note: Flags indicate national team as defined under FIFA eligibility rules; some limited exceptions apply. Players may hold more than one non-FIFA nationality.

No. / Pos. / Nation / Player; — / GK / FRA / Théo Sardou (at FC Yellow Boys Weiler-la-Tour until 30 June 2027)	No. / Pos. / Nation / Player

== Managers ==
- (Luxembourg) Gordon Braun (2009–10)
- (Luxembourg) Luc Muller (March 16, 2010 – June 30, 2011)
- (Portugal) Carlos Texeira (July 1, 2011 – June 30, 2013)
- (France) Manuel Peixoto (July 1, 2013–)
