= FC Wiltz 71 =

Association football club in Luxembourg

Coordinates: 49°58′2.7″N 5°55′39″E

Wiltz 71
- Full name: Football Club Wiltz 71
- Founded: 12 March 1971; 55 years ago
- Ground: Stade Am Pëtz, Weidingen
- Capacity: 3,000
- Chairman: Michael Schenk
- Manager: Bertrand Crasson
- League: National Division
- 2025–26: Division of Honour, 3rd of 16 (promoted)
- Website: https://www.fcwiltz.com/
Home colours	Away colours

FC Wiltz 71 is a football club based in the town of Wiltz, in north-western Luxembourg. The team currently compete in the National Division, the top tier of Luxembourgish football.

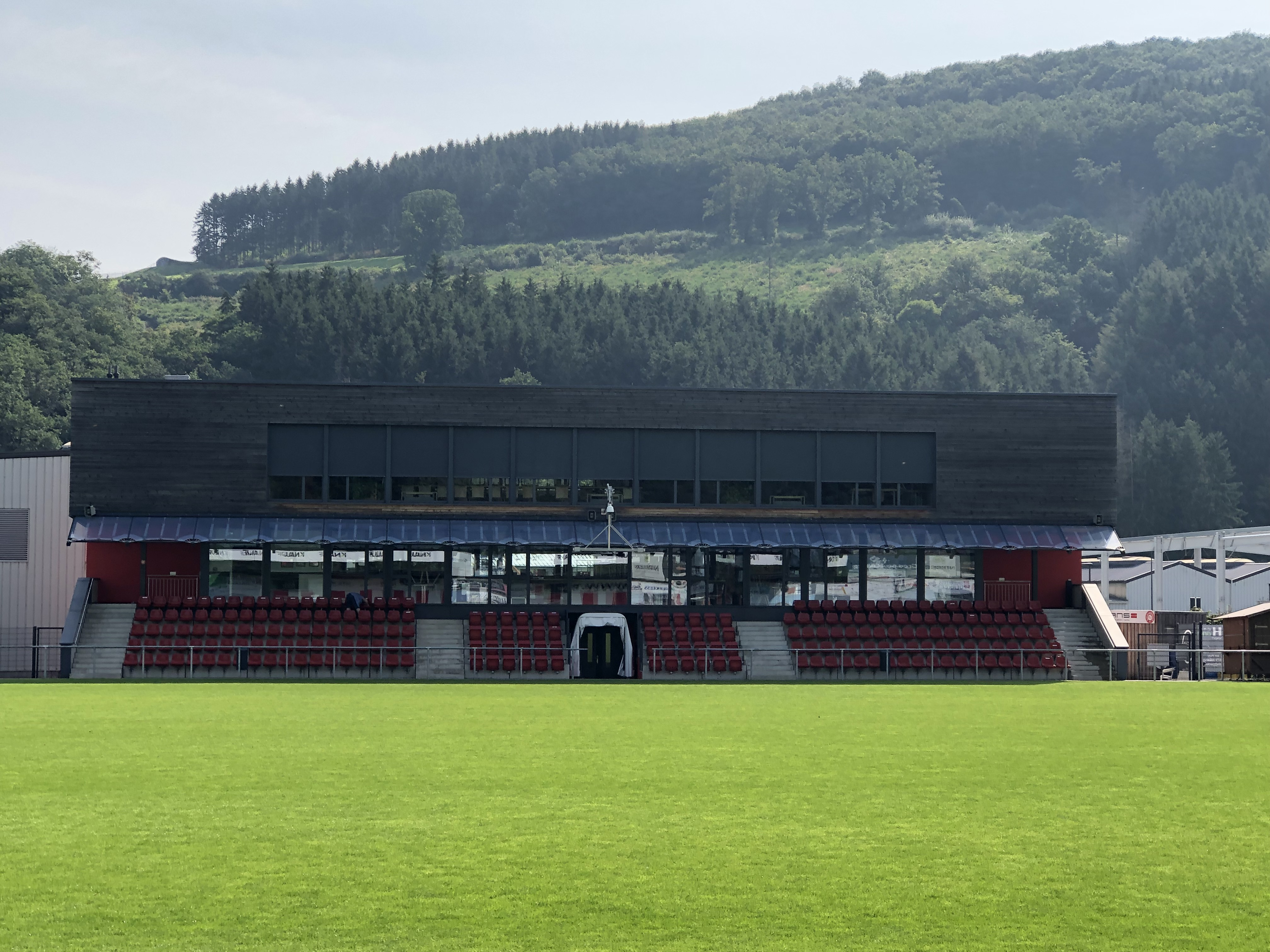
Stade Am Pëtz, Weidingen, Luxembourg

== History ==
The club was founded on March 12, 1971 by the merger of Union Sportive Niederwiltz and FC Gold a Roud and in 1976, the club also absorbed Arminia Weidingen. Together, all three clubs formed the new FC Wiltz 71 and the team began playing at the Stade Géitz located in Wiltz. Later, the club moved to the Stade Am Pëtz in nearby Weidingen which increased capacity by 1,000 to a total of 3,000 fans.

Within ten years of its formation, the club achieved promotion to the National Division. The club has been relegated from the top tier to the second tier of Luxembourg football, the Division of Honour, a total of seven times, most recently during the 2015-2016 season when they finished 12th.

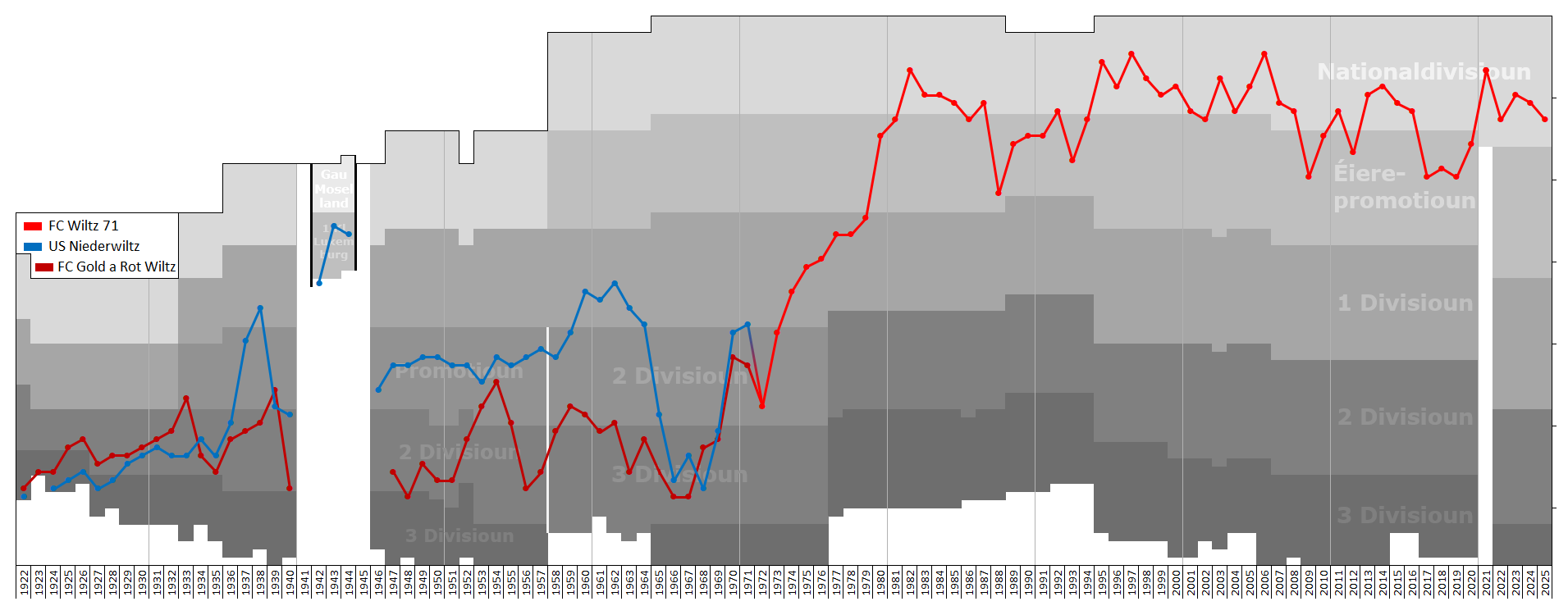
Historical league performance chart of FC Wiltz 71

In 2001, Wiltz reached their only cup final to date when they played in the Luxembourg Cup, against rivals Etzella Ettelbruck. Wiltz lost the match 3-5 in a closely contested affair.

The clubs highest finish in the league is 5th, which they have achieved twice, once during the 1996/97 season and again in the 2005/06 season and on both occasions narrowly missing out on qualification for European football.

Due to the COVID-19 pandemic, football in Luxembourg was suspended on March 12, 2020. At the time, the club was in second place in the Division of Honor after 15 matches, an automatic promotion spot. On April 22, 2020, the Luxembourg Football Federation announced that the season would be ended, meaning that Wiltz were promoted to the National Division by default.

== Current squad ==
As of 15 September 2026

Note: Flags indicate national team as defined under FIFA eligibility rules; some limited exceptions apply. Players may hold more than one non-FIFA nationality.

No.	Pos.	Nation	Player
2	DF	FRA	Henrique Lubanzadio
3	DF	LUX	Hugo Costa
4	DF	BEL	Loïc Reciputi
5	DF	LUX	Victoire Ramazani
6	MF	LUX	Christophe Schroeder
7	MF	LUX	Chris Philipps
8	MF	BEL	Alexandro Cavagnera
9	FW	BEL	Ridwane Bouchibti
10	DF	LUX	Ben Biver
11	MF	BEL	Maxime Cavelier
13	DF	UKR	Denys Prychynenko
14	MF	NED	Quentin Bosquin
17	DF	LUX	Andy Rodrigues
22	MF	BEL	Louka Franco

No.	Pos.	Nation	Player
29	FW	BEL	Gabriel Lemoine
30	DF	LUX	Preston Paciencia (on loan from Racing Union)
31	DF	FRA	Moustaphe Coulibaly
32	GK	LUX	Lucien Nizet
55	GK	GAM	Omar Choi
71	MF	BEL	Flavio Gargano
77	MF	FRA	Nabil Hassaïni
80	FW	FRA	Elie Thelcide-Badia
88	GK	ITA	Luca Guarneri
93	DF	GER	Serkan Gecgin
95	DF	FRA	Ryan Noubli
98	MF	ESP	Mamadou Sow
99	FW	BEL	Benjamin Romeyns (on loan from UNA Strassen)

=== Notable Former Players ===
- Théo Malget, Luxembourgish international
- Samuel Ipoua, Cameroon international

== Managers ==
As of October 2026

- (Luxembourg) Albert Adams (July 1, 1976 - June 30, 1978)
- (Luxembourg) Charles Pauly (July 1, 1992 - June 30, 1993)
- (Belgium) Marc Grosjean (November 30, 1993 - November 30, 1995)
- (Netherlands) Rob Delahaije (July 1, 1996 - June 30, 1998)
- (Luxembourg) Albert Adams (July 1, 1998 - June 30, 1999)
- (Algeria) Rachid Belhout (July 1, 1998 - November 1, 1998)
- (Belgium) Jacques Dodemont (? - March 30, 2002)
- (Belgium) Raphaël Quaranta (July 1, 2002 - June 30, 2004)
- (Luxembourg) Charles Pauly (July 1, 2004 - June 30, 2005)
- (Belgium) Daniel Boccar (July 1, 2005 - November 1, 2006)
- (Luxembourg) Marc Glod (November 10, 2006 - June 30, 2007)
- (Belgium) Joel Crahay (July 1, 2007 - April 21, 2008)
- (Luxembourg) Marc Glod (April 22, 2008 - June 30, 2008)
- (Luxembourg) Mike Ney (July 1, 2008 – June 30, 2009)
- (Luxembourg) Steve Majerus (July 1, 2009 – Oct 27, 2010)
- (Belgium) Pascal Lebrun (Oct 27, 2010 – Nov 5, 2012)
- (Bosnia and Herzegovina) Samir Kalabic (Nov 6, 2012 – June 30, 2014)
- (Luxembourg) Claude Ottelé (July 1, 2014 – June 30, 2015)
- (Luxembourg) Henri Bossi (July 1, 2015 – June 30, 2016)
- (Luxembourg) Dan Huet (July 1, 2016 – October 18, 2021)
- (Belgium) David Vandenbroeck (October 20, 2021 – September 27, 2024)
- (Luxembourg) Mikhail Zaritskiy (September 30, 2024 – June 2025)
- (Belgium) Bertrand Crasson (October 18 2026 – present)

== Club Officials ==
As of 21 August 2024

- President: Michael Schenk
- Vice-President: Christian Lisch
- Sporting Director: Robert Jansen

First Team

- Coach: David Vandenbroeck
- Assistant Coaches: Guy Libambu, Joel Hausman, Phillipe Goullier
- Goalkeeping Coach: Alain Leclerf
- Club Doctor: Maureen Poncin
- Fitness Coach: Arnaud Scalco
- Physiotherapists: Justine Deremiens, Jeason Diez, Bernard Heens
- Nutritionist: Simon Mathieu
- Assistants: Roland Fraiture, Eric Greisch
- Volunteer: Mario Raffaelli

Academy

- President: Christian Lisch
- U15 - U19 Coach: Marcel Bamberg
- U7 - U13 Coach: Joel Hausman

== Honours ==
- Luxembourg Cup
  - Runners-up (1): 2000–01

== Women's team ==
Wiltz have a women's team, currently competing in the Dames Ligue 3 Series 1, the 3rd tier of women's football in Luxembourg, having previously competed in the Dames Ligue 1 as part of a Union with AS Wincrange between 2021 and 2023.
