= Luxembourg Football Federation =

Governing body of association football in Luxembourg

UEFA
- Founded: 22 November 1908; 117 years ago
- Headquarters: Mondercange
- FIFA affiliation: 1910
- UEFA affiliation: 15 June 1954; 72 years ago
- President: Paul Philipp (since 2004)
- Website: www.flf.lu

The Luxembourg Football Federation (Luxembourgish: Lëtzebuerger Foussballfederatioun; French: Fédération Luxembourgeoise de Football, FLF; German: Luxemburger Fußballverband) is the governing body of football in Luxembourg. It organises the Luxembourg football league and the Luxembourg national football team. It is based in Mondercange, to the south of Luxembourg City.

== List of presidents ==
- 1908–1913: Max Metz
- 1913–1915: Jules Fournelle
- 1915–1917: René Leclère
- 1917–1918: Jean Geschwind
- 1918–1920: Guillaume Lemmer
- 1921–1950: Gustave Jacquemart
- 1950–1961: Émile Hamilius
- 1961–1968: Albert Kongs
- 1968–1969: Nicolas Birtz
- 1969–1981: René Van Den Bulcke
- 1981–1986: Raymond Wagner
- 1986–1998: Norbert Konter
- 1998–2004: Henri Roemer
- 2004–present: Paul Philipp

== Current Sponsorship ==
- Orange
- Möbel Alvisee
- Volkswagen
- Sudstroum
- Loterie Nationale
- Grant Thornton
- Emile Weber
- Hornbach
- RTL Lëtzebuerg
- Freelander's
- Jans
- Bofferding
- Lalux
- BGL BNP Paribas
- Luxemburger Wort

== Previous Sponsorship ==
- Jako
- CBZ Sport Construct
- Post Luxembourg
- Haerespennchen
- Kinder
- Bram
- La Voix du Luxembourg
- Coca-Cola
- Maison Steffen
- Repro68
- Ariane Soft
- Xl Turf
- Munhowen
- Group Charles Kieffer
- Bernard-Massard
- Mercedes-Benz
- Desso
