= US Esch =

Association football club in Luxembourg

- Full name: Union Sportive Esch-Alzette
- Founded: 1913; 113 years ago
- Ground: Stade Lankelz
- Capacity: 1,500
- Chairman: Pedro Ferreira
- Manager: Claude Campos
- League: 3. Division
- 2025–26: 2. Division Series 2, 13th of 14 (relegated)
- Website: www.sport50.com/usesch2/
Home colours	Away colours

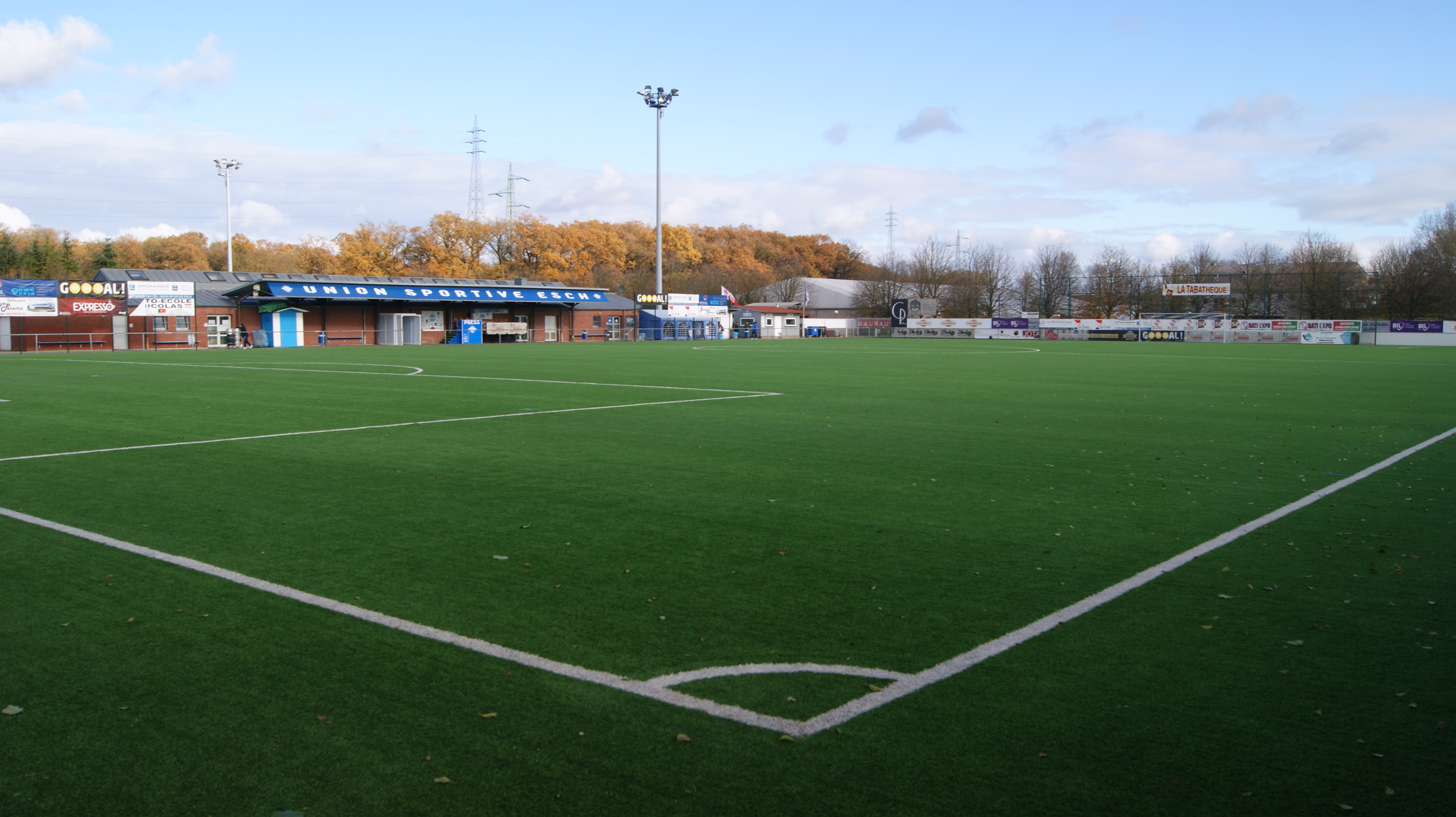
Centre Sportif Lankhelz

Union Sportive Esch-Alzette is a football club, based in Esch-sur-Alzette, Luxembourg. The club won the second division Promotion d'Honneur in the 2016–17 season and gained promotion to the Luxembourg National Division. The club colours are blue and white.

== Current squad ==
Note: Flags indicate national team as defined under FIFA eligibility rules; some limited exceptions apply. Players may hold more than one non-FIFA nationality.

No.	Pos.	Nation	Player
—	GK	LUX	Daniel Vieira
—	GK	LUX	Dany Goncalves Texieira
—	DF	POR	Mike Teixeira Magalhaes
—	DF	LUX	Donato Mancini
—	DF	POR	André Rodrigues
—	DF	POR	Angelo Rego
—	DF	POR	Daniel Novais
—	DF	POR	Ricardo Vieira
—	DF	LUX	Christophe Araujo
—	DF	POR	Kiki

No.	Pos.	Nation	Player
—	DF	FRA	Wanys Kheli
—	DF	FRA	Hervé Mombela
—	MF	LUX	Bruno Sousa da Silva
—	MF	POR	Antonio Crespo
—	MF	LUX	Paulo Portal
—	MF	POR	Iúri Simao
—	MF	LUX	Tom Nilles
—	FW	LUX	Julien Chaba
—	FW	LUX	Gilson Antonio Silva Borges
—	FW	SEN	Mouhamed Gueye
