= F.C. Luxembourg City =

Association football club in Luxembourg

- Full name: Football Club Luxembourg City
- Founded: 26 March 2004; 22 years ago
- Ground: Luxembourg-Cents; Cents, Luxembourg City
- Capacity: 2,800
- Chairman: Paulo Lopes
- Manager: Christophe Bello
- League: Division of Honour
- 2025–26: Division of Honour, 6th of 16
- Website: www.fclcity.lu
Home colours	Away colours

F.C. Luxembourg City is a football club, based in Hamm, Luxembourg City. They currently play in the Division of Honour, the second tier of Luxembourgish football.

== History ==
The club was founded as a result of merger on 26 March 2004 after a fusion between FC Hamm 37 and FC RM 86 Luxembourg. They spent their first seasons in the Second Division but clinched promotion to the Luxembourg National Division after the 2006–07 season.

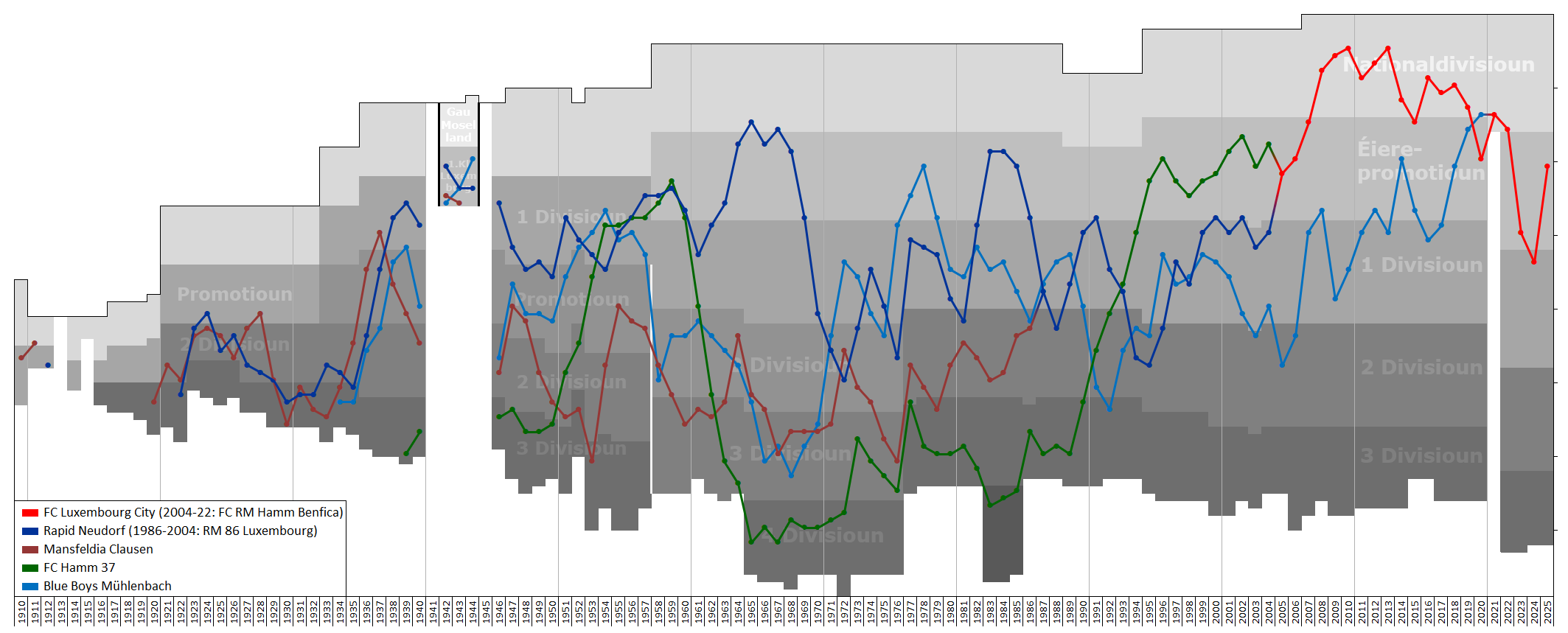
Historical league performance chart of FC Luxembourg City and its predecessors

FC RM (Rapid Mansfeldia) 86 Luxembourg was itself founded after FC Rapid Neudorf (founded in 1909) and FC Mansfeldia Clausen-Cents (founded in 1919) merged in 1986 after both clubs were relegated from their respective divisions. FC Hamm 37 was founded in 1937.

At around the end of the 2021–22 season, the club changed its name to F.C. Luxembourg City with the new branding unveiled before the 2022–23 season.

== Current squad ==
As of 8 April, 2026

Note: Flags indicate national team as defined under FIFA eligibility rules; some limited exceptions apply. Players may hold more than one non-FIFA nationality.

No.	Pos.	Nation	Player
4	DF	LUX	Matteo Nelissen
5	DF	FRA	Sékou Coulibaly
6	MF	FRA	Moulaye N'Diaye
7	MF	FRA	Matis Bekhti
8	DF	LUX	Rick Brito
9	FW	BEL	Jean-Désiré Tibor
10	FW	SEN	Alioune Diop
11	MF	ITA	Zakaria Kessab
12	GK	LUX	Tim Less
14	FW	ITA	Louis Mendy
15	DF	FRA	Alexis Njamen
16	MF	LUX	Elvis Lima
17	MF	CPV	Keywene Furtado

No.	Pos.	Nation	Player
18	MF	SEN	Moussa Seydi
19	MF	ESP	Ricky Bea
20	MF	FRA	Jihan Rayar
21	MF	FRA	Fathy Moug
24	FW	FRA	Jean-Jacques Sery
25	FW	NIG	Fabrice Yao
28	DF	LUX	David Simoes
31	DF	FRA	Alexandre Vajente
32	GK	FRA	Raïs Amrani
35	DF	POR	Diogo Lima
38	MF	ANG	Stélvio
80	GK	LUX	Noah Olm

== Managers ==
- (Germany) Michael Lofy (25 December 2007 – 30 May 2008)
- (Argentina) Fernando Gutiérrez (1 July 2008 – 30 June 2010)
- (Portugal) Alvaro da Cruz (1 July 2010 – 21 February 2011)
- (Brazil) Felipe Vila Verde (21 February 2011 – 31 December 2011)
- (Luxembourg) Carlo Weis (1 January 2012 – 10 September 2013)
- (Portugal) Rui Vieira (10 September 2013 – 30 September 2013)
- (Portugal) Paulo Gomes (7 October 2013 – 1 July 2016)
- (Luxembourg) Daniel Santos (1 July 2016 – )
- (France) Christophe Bello (1 July 2023 – )
