= UN Käerjéng 97 =

Association football club in Luxembourg

Käerjeng '97
- Full name: Uewer Nidder Käerjeng 97
- Founded: 1997; 29 years ago
- Ground: Stade Um Dribbel, Bascharage
- Capacity: 2,500
- President: Christian Bour
- Manager: Manuel Correia
- League: National Division
- 2025–26: National Division, 8th of 16
- Website: www.un-kaerjeng.lu
| Home colours | Away colours |

U.N. Käerjeng '97 is a football club based in Bascharage, south-west Luxembourg. They currently compete in the National Division, the top tier of Luxembourgish football. Their home games are played at the Stade Um Dribbel.

== History ==
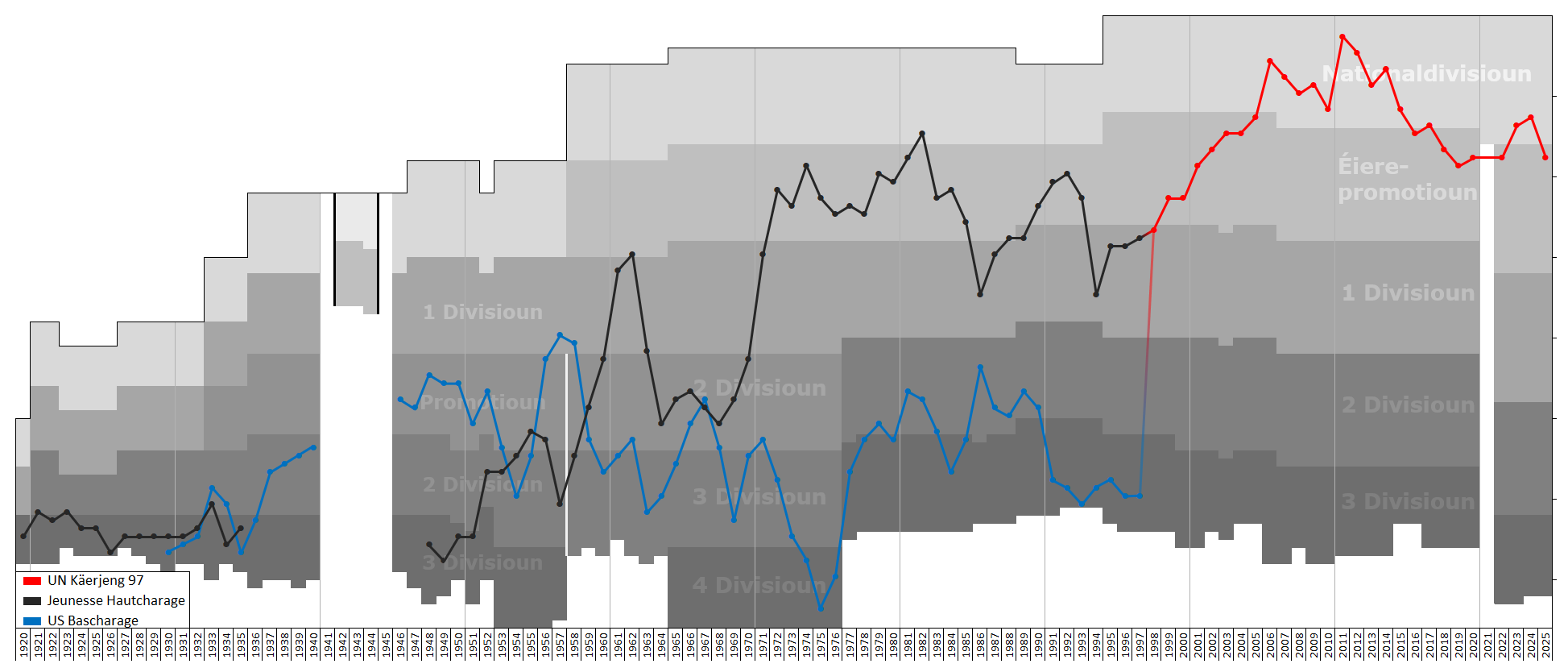
Historical league performance chart of UN Käerjéng 97 and its predecessors

The club was founded in 1997 after a merger between Union Sportive Bascharage and Jeunesse Hautcharage.

In the 2005–06 season, Käerjeng finished sixth in the National Division. They finished second in their relegation group, but were already guaranteed their safety before they played any games in it.

== Honours ==
=== As Jeunesse Hautcharage ===
- Luxembourg Cup

Winners (1): 1970–71

== European competition ==
=== As Jeunesse Hautcharage ===
Jeunesse Hautcharage qualified for UEFA European competition once.

- UEFA Cup Winners' Cup

First round (1): 1971–72

On their first tie in Europe, they suffered the largest ever aggregate defeat in UEFA competition: 21–0 against Chelsea. Which to this date, is the largest ever aggregate score for an official UEFA football match (but is equal with Feyenoord Rotterdam, who achieved the very same result against US Rumelange winning first leg 9–0 and second 12–0 in 1972–73 UEFA Cup)

=== As U.N. Käerjeng '97 ===
- UEFA Cup

Second qualifying round, 2007–08

After losing the previous season's cup final against F91 Dudelange U.N. Käerjeng '97 qualified for the UEFA Cup for the second time in the club's history, drawing Norwegian side Lillestrøm in the first qualifying round. Losing merely 2–1 away at Åråsen stadion in itself was a remarkable feat for the club, but after a very surprising 1–0 win at home, U.N. Käerjeng '97 was through to the second qualifying round on away goals after a 2–2 aggregate score. U.N. Käerjeng '97 lost 4–0 in the second qualifying round to Standard Liège.

Thus, Käerjeng's overall European record is:

| | P | W | D | L | GF | GA | GD |
|---|---|---|---|---|---|---|---|
| U.N. Käerjeng '97 | 8 | 1 | 1 | 6 | 4 | 19 | −15 |

== Former managers ==
- (Italy) Angelo Fiorucci (July 1, 2000 – June 30, 2009)
- (Luxembourg) Claude Heinz (July 1, 2009 – Dec 8, 2009)
- (Luxembourg) Roland Schaack (Jan 1, 2010–)

== Current squad ==
As of 15 September 2026

Note: Flags indicate national team as defined under FIFA eligibility rules; some limited exceptions apply. Players may hold more than one non-FIFA nationality.

| No. | Pos. | Nation | Player |
|---|---|---|---|
| 1 | GK | LUX | Christopher Gonzalez |
| 2 | DF | LUX | Ivan Albanese |
| 3 | DF | LUX | Lars Gerson |
| 4 | DF | LUX | Cédric Kockelmann |
| 5 | DF | FRA | Gianni Ubaldini |
| 6 | DF | LUX | Noé Ewert |
| 7 | FW | FRA | Bryan Maison |
| 8 | MF | LUX | Olivier Thill |
| 9 | FW | COD | Isidore Mabwati |
| 10 | MF | LUX | Valerio Barbaro |
| 11 | FW | SEN | Abou Dieye |

| No. | Pos. | Nation | Player |
|---|---|---|---|
| 16 | MF | LUX | Diogo Dinis |
| 17 | MF | LUX | Yannick Schaus |
| 18 | MF | FRA | Sonny Perrey |
| 20 | MF | LUX | Tim Ewert |
| 21 | DF | LUX | Robin Moutschen |
| 22 | GK | CPV | Iván Cruz |
| 24 | MF | ENG | Steven Kabungwe |
| 27 | MF | LUX | Yannis Dublin |
| 28 | DF | LUX | Luca Intini |
| 30 | MF | LUX | Ben Klein |
| 33 | DF | FRA | Jason Grbic |
