= FC Rodange 91 =

Association football club in Luxembourg

Coordinates: 49.545818°N 5.837228°E

Rodange 91
- Full name: FC Rodange 91
- Founded: 31 April 1991; 35 years ago
- Ground: Stade Joseph Philippart
- Capacity: 3,400
- President: Semin Civovic
- Manager: Faz Kuduzović
- League: Division of Honour
- 2025–26: National Division, 16th of 16 (relegated)
- Website: www.fcr91.lu
Home colours	Away colours

FC Rodange 91 is a football club based in Rodange, Luxembourg. They currently compete in the Division of Honour, the second tier of Luxembourgish football.

== History ==
The club was founded in 1991 as a merger between Rodange sides FC Chiers (founded in 1907) and FC Racing (1931). Chiers had played fourteen seasons in the Luxembourg National Division between 1938 and 1980 and Racing seven between 1946 and 1956. Racing also reached the final of the Luxembourg Cup in 1949, where it lost 1–0 to Stade Dudelange.

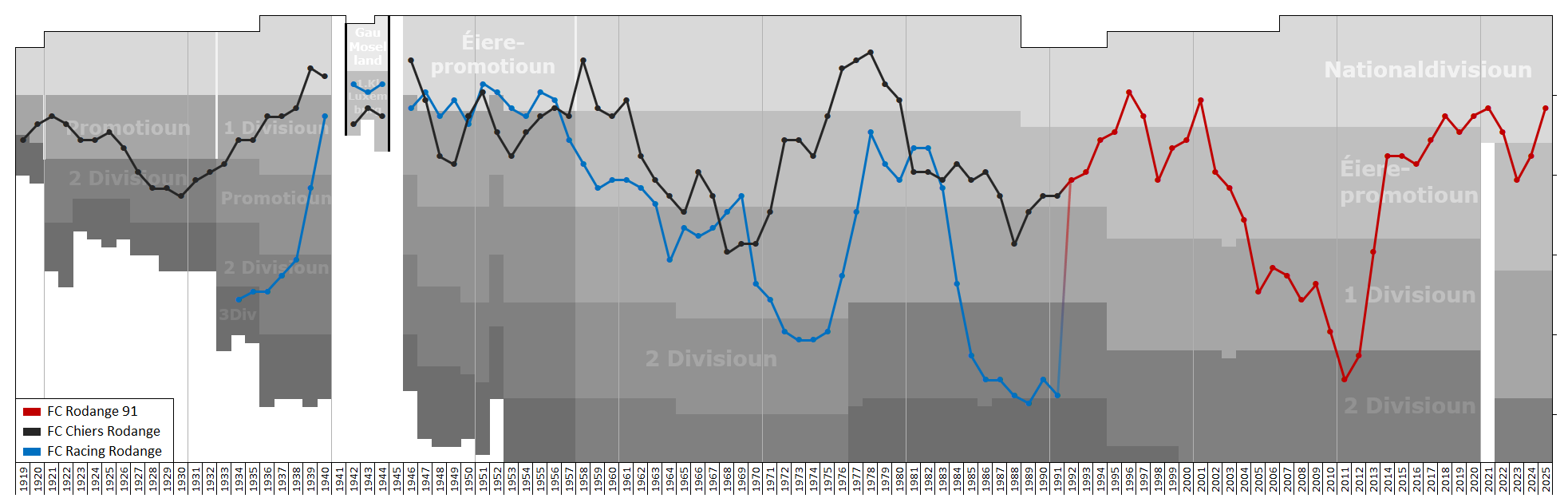
Historical league performance chart of FC Rodange 91

Merger club FC Rodange 91 reached the National Division for the first time in 1995, but was relegated back to the second tier- Luxembourg Division of Honour after the 1996–97 season. FC Rodange 91 then played two more seasons in the top tier, in 2000–01 and 2017–18 before returning to the highest level in 2019.

At the end of the 2020–21 season, the club moved to play their home games at the Stade Municipal, Pétange, home of Union Titus Pétange, while a new stand was being built at the Stade Jos Philippart. The stand opened in May 2023.

== Current squad ==
As of 14 March 2026

Note: Flags indicate national team as defined under FIFA eligibility rules; some limited exceptions apply. Players may hold more than one non-FIFA nationality.

No.	Pos.	Nation	Player
1	GK	LUX	Kevin Apolinario
2	MF	LUX	Gianni Monteiro
3	DF	LUX	Wilson Peprah
5	DF	FRA	Paul Mortas
6	MF	LUX	Luka Rakic
7	FW	GBS	Bruno Ramírez
8	MF	BEL	Mario Muzhaqi
9	FW	FRA	Kévin Schur
10	MF	CRO	Filip Bojic
11	MF	LUX	Almin Skrijelj
13	MF	POR	Brandon Lima
16	DF	LUX	Yohann Torres

No.	Pos.	Nation	Player
17	DF	FRA	Tom Battisti
19	MF	ALG	Dinan Amiri
21	MF	SMN	Yanis Montantin
22	DF	LUX	Lucas Taveira (on loan from Differdange 03)
23	MF	LUX	Adel Civovic
29	FW	LUX	Elias Holbach
30	FW	FRA	Mathéo Messuwe
31	GK	MNE	Elvin Šabanović
44	DF	LUX	Aldin Skenderovic
48	MF	LUX	Loris Caradonna
77	FW	BEL	Yanis Mbombo
99	GK	FRA	Hugo Wolf

== Women's team ==
As of the 2026–27 season, Rodange no longer have an active women's team.

In the 1972–73 season, the women's team of FC Racing Rodange finished second in the Dames Ligue 1.
