= US Rumelange =

Association football club in Luxembourg

- Full name: Football Club Union Sportive Rumelange
- Founded: 3 May 1908; 118 years ago
- Ground: Stade Municipal, Rumelange
- Capacity: 2,950
- President: Gérard Jeitz
- Manager: Stefano Bensi
- League: National Division
- 2025–26: Division of Honour, 1st of 16 (promoted)
- Website: Official website
Home colours	Away colours

Union Sportive Rumelange, usually abbreviated to US Rumelange, is a football club based in Rumelange, in south-western Luxembourg. They currently compete in the National Division, the top tier of Luxembourgish football.

== History ==
In the 2005–2006 season, Rumelange finished eleventh in the National Division. It was almost impossible for Rumelange to avoid fourth place, and they were pitted against FC Mamer in a relegation play-off. Rumelange lost on penalties, and were relegated to the Division of Honour. They won promotion to the highest level again at the end of the 2007–2008 season.

== Honours ==
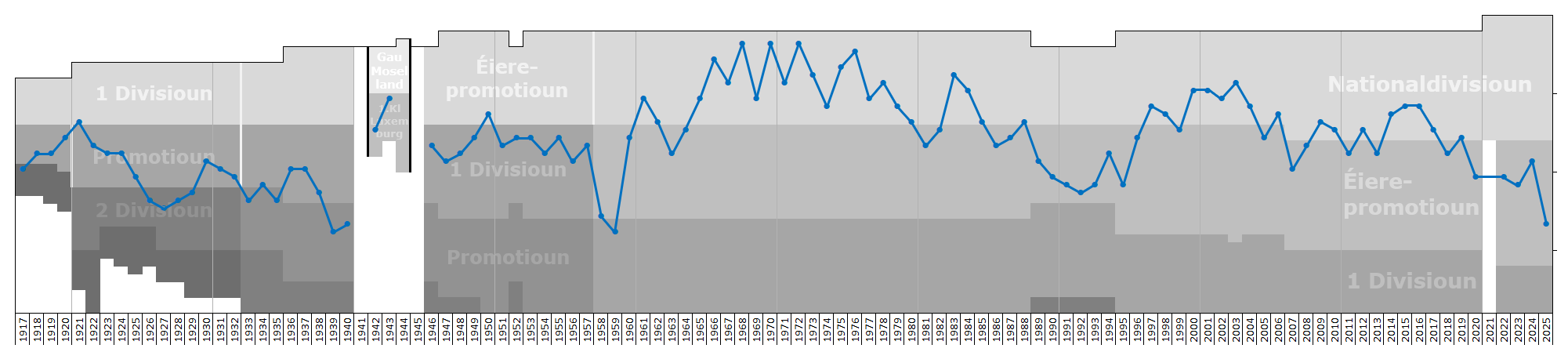
Historical league performance chart of US Rumelange

=== League ===
National Division

- Runners-up: 1967–68, 1969–70, 1971–72

=== Cups ===
Luxembourg Cup

- Winners: 1967–68, 1974–75
- Runners-up: 1981–82, 1983–84

== European competition ==
US Rumelange have qualified for UEFA European competition four times. However, they have been generally unsuccessful; during their 1972–73 UEFA Cup campaign, they suffered a 21–0 aggregate loss to Feyenoord, a record defeat that has not been eclipsed in any UEFA cup competition - although it was matched in the 1971–72 Cup Winners' Cup for when Chelsea beat Jeunesse Hautcharage by the same aggregate scoreline.

- UEFA Cup Winners' Cup

First round (2): 1968–69, 1975–76

- UEFA Cup

First round (2): 1970–71, 1972–73

	P	W	D	L	GF	GA	GD
US Rumelange	8	1	0	7	3	48	−45

Season	Competition	Round	Opponent	Home	Away	Agg.	Ref
1972–73	UEFA Cup	First Round	(Netherlands) Feyenoord	0–12	9–0	0–21	

== Current squad ==
As of 25 July 2026

Note: Flags indicate national team as defined under FIFA eligibility rules; some limited exceptions apply. Players may hold more than one non-FIFA nationality.

No.	Pos.	Nation	Player
1	GK	LUX	Liliane Weyer
2	DF	FRA	Samuel Bousseau
3	DF	FRA	Igor Bour
4	MF	LUX	Tom Ivesic
6	MF	FRA	Valentin Sannier
7	MF	LUX	Patrik Teixeira
8	MF	LUX	Ajdin Bjelic
9	FW	POR	Calmente Mendes
10	MF	POR	Bryan Gomes
11	MF	LUX	Adrian Mendes
12	DF	FRA	Noah Ruffini
13	MF	LUX	Fabio Dos Santos
14	FW	LUX	Axel Cecchetti
15	FW	GUI	Angelo Mendes
16	MF	FRA	Souleimani Dibassy
17	MF	FRA	Dani Freitas
18	MF	LUX	Amish Sharma
19	FW	CPV	Alisson Coelho

No.	Pos.	Nation	Player
20	DF	LUX	Goncalo Do Cabo
21	MF	LUX	Andrea Felten
22	GK	LUX	Luka Ivesic
23	DF	POR	Joscelino
24	FW	FRA	Lucas Rodrigues
25	DF	LUX	Paddy Funck
26	DF	LUX	Thomas Schroeder
27	MF	LUX	Jeferson Lopes
28	MF	LUX	Kilian Nascimento
29	DF	BIH	Hassan Muharemovic
30	GK	FRA	Allan Luthardt
33	GK	LUX	Yan Heil
44	DF	LUX	Nenad Dragovic
48	MF	LUX	Malik Pinheiro
77	FW	FRA	Jules Diallo
88	MF	CAN	Marco Chang
-	DF	LUX	Clayton Irigoyen

== Staff ==
As of 26 September 2025

Head Coach	Christian Lutz
Assistant Coach	Mike Dos Santos
Physio	Paul Schroeder
Goalkeeper Coach	Rui Moreira

== Managers ==
- (Luxembourg) Marc Thomé (July 1, 2007 – April 26, 2010)
- (Luxembourg) Manuel Cardoni (April 27, 2010 – Oct 1, 2012)
- (France) Sebastien Allieri (July 1, 2013 – 23 May 2015)
- (Luxembourg) Sven Loscheider (29 May 2017 – present)
