= 2024–25 Luxembourg Division of Honour =

Football league season in Luxembourg

Luxembourg Division of Honour
- Season: 2024-25
- Dates: 17 August 2024 - 25 May 2025
- Champions: Mamer 32
- Promoted: Bissen; Jeunesse Canach; Käerjéng 97; Mamer 32
- Relegated: Avenir Beggen; Sandweiler
- Matches: 200
- Goals: 646 (3.23 per match)
- Top goalscorer: Mickaël Jager (Mamer 32, 29 goals)
- Biggest home win: Käerjéng 3–0 Feulen (22 September 2024); Alisontia 3–0 Sandweiler (25 August 2024)
- Biggest away win: Sandweiler 0–4 Mamer (18 August 2024); Rumelange 1–5 Mamer (1 September 2024)
- Highest scoring: Rumelange 4–4 Walferdange (15 September 2024)
- Longest winning run: 4 matches Käerjéng
- Longest unbeaten run: 6 matches Käerjéng; Berbourg; Walferdange
- Longest winless run: 6 matches Rumelange; Avenir Beggen; Sandweiler
- Longest losing run: 4 matches Sandweiler
- All statistics correct as of 25 September 2024.

The 2024-25 Luxembourg Division of Honour was the 64th season of second-tier association football in Luxembourg. The season began on 17 August 2024 and ended on 25 May 2025.

== Team changes ==
The following teams changed division from the 2023-24 season:

=== To Division of Honour ===
Promoted from 1. Division

- Atert Bissen
- Feulen
- Luxembourg City
- Sandweiler

Relegated from National Division

- Schifflange 95
- Marisca Mersch
- UN Käerjéng

=== From Division of Honour ===
Promoted to National Division

- SC Bettembourg
- FC Rodange 91
- US Hostert

Relegated to 1. Division

- Blo-Wäiss Medernach
- CS Grevenmacher
- FC Yellow Boys
- FC Lorentzweiler

== Teams and locations ==
Team	Location	Stadium	Capacity
Alisontia Steinsel	Steinsel	Stade Henri Bausch	1,500
Atert Bissen	Bissen	Terrain ZAC Klengbousbierg	1,500
Avenir Beggen	Beggen	Stade rue Henri Dunant	4,830
Berdenia Berbourg	Berbourg	Stade Renert	800
Etzella Ettelbruck	Ettelbruck	Stade Am Deich	2,020
FC Koeppchen Wormeldange	Wormeldange	Stade Am Ga	1,000
FC Résidence Walferdange	Walferdange	Stade Prince Henri	1,000
Jeunesse Canach	Canach	Stade Rue de Lenningen	1,000
Luxembourg City	Luxembourg City	Luxembourg-Cents	2,800
Mamer 32	Mamer	Stade François Trausch	2,600
Marisca Mersch	Mersch	Terrain Schintgespesch	1,000
Schifflange 95	Schifflange	Stade Rue Denis Netgen	3,100
UN Käerjéng 97	Bascharge	Stade Um Dribbel	2,500
US Rumelange	Rumelange	Stade Municipal	2,950
US Sandweiler	Sandweiler	Stade Norbert Hübsch	2,000

== League table ==
Pos	Team	Pld	W	D	L	GF	GA	GD	Pts	Promotion, qualification or relegation
1	Mamer 32 (C, P)	30	19	8	3	69	29	+40	65	Promotion to the Luxembourg National Division
2	Käerjéng (P)	30	18	8	4	66	31	+35	62	Promotion to the Luxembourg National Division
3	Bissen (O, P)	30	17	8	5	60	32	+28	59	Qualification for the Luxembourg National Division play-offs
4	Jeunesse Canach (O, P)	30	15	4	11	52	45	+7	49	Qualification for the Luxembourg National Division play-offs
5	Luxembourg City	30	14	5	11	40	38	+2	47	
6	Mersch	30	13	5	12	49	49	0	44	
7	Walferdange	30	11	9	10	50	51	−1	42	
8	Etzella	30	10	10	10	44	40	+4	40	
9	Berbourg	30	9	11	10	36	39	−3	38	
10	Steinsel	30	10	8	12	51	56	−5	38	
11	Rumelange	30	10	7	13	61	63	−2	37	
12	Feulen	30	9	9	12	40	44	−4	36	
13	Schifflange (O)	30	10	5	15	43	46	−3	35	Qualification for the Luxembourg Division of Honour play-offs
14	Koeppchen (O)	30	6	12	12	44	55	−11	30	Qualification for the Luxembourg Division of Honour play-offs
15	Avenir Beggen (R)	30	6	6	18	31	57	−26	24	Relegation to the Luxembourg 1. Division
16	Sandweiler (R)	30	2	7	21	28	89	−61	13	Relegation to the Luxembourg 1. Division

(C) Champions; (O) Play-off winners; (P) Promoted; (R) Relegated

== Luxembourg Division of Honour play-offs ==
The thirteenth and fourteenth-placed teams (Schifflange and Koeppchen) each faced the second placed teams from the 1. Division (Syra Mensdorf and Sporting Mertzig) for the final two places in the 2025–26 Luxembourg Division of Honour.

31 May 2025

Koeppchen	1–0	Sporting Mertzig
Parreira 38'

Terrain rue de Hunsdorf, Lorentzweiler

2 June 2025

Schifflange	2–0	Syra Mensdorf
Karaoui 37'; Koriche 79'

Stade John Grün, Mondorf-les-Bains

== Season statistics ==
=== Top scorers ===
As of 11 May 2025

Rank	Player	Club	Goals
1	(France) Mickaël Jager	Mamer 32	29
2	(Montenegro) Admir Desevic	Jeunesse Canach	21
3	(Luxembourg) Patrick Macedo	Résidence Walferdange	18
4	(Algeria) Idir Boutrif	UN Käerjéng 97	17
4	(Luxembourg) Benjamin Bresch	Marisca Mersch	17
6	(Senegal) Fine Bop	Atert Bissen	16
7	(France) Bryan Maison	US Rumelange	15
7	(France) Idrissa Dieme	Alisontia Steinsel	15
