= List of football stadiums in Luxembourg =

The following is a list of football stadiums in Luxembourg, ranked in order of capacity, with the minimum capacity being 1,000. The list includes total stadium capacity not just seating capacity.

== Current stadiums ==
No.	Image	Stadium	Capacity	City	Home team	League	Ref
1		Stade de Luxembourg	9,386	Luxembourg City	Luxembourg national football team	–	
2		Stade Josy Barthel	8,054	Luxembourg City	No tenant	–	
3		Stade du Thillenberg	6,300	Differdange	Differdange 03	National Division	
4		Stade Achille Hammerel	5,814	Luxembourg City	Racing FC	National Division	
5		Stade rue Henri Dunant	4,900	Beggen	FC Avenir Beggen	Division of Honour	
6		Stade Alphonse Theis	4,100	Hesperange	Swift Hesperange	National Division	
7		Op Flohr Stadion	4,062	Grevenmacher	CS Grevenmacher	1. Division Series 2	
8		Stade de la Frontière	4,000	Esch-sur-Alzette	Jeunesse Esch	National Division	
9		Stade Émile Mayrisch	3,900	Esch-sur-Alzette	Fola Esch	Division of Honour	
10		Stade Municipal de la Ville de Differdange	3,500	Differdange	Differdange 03	National Division	
11		Stade Municipal, Schifflange	3,500	Schifflange	Schifflange 95	–	
12		Stade Communal, Mondercange	3,300	Mondercange	Mondercange	Division of Honour	
13		Stade Am Pëtz	3,000	Wiltz	Wiltz 71	National Division	
14		Stade Municipal, Rumelange	2,950	Rumelange	US Rumelange	National Division	
15		Stade Jos Haupert	2,800	Niederkorn	Progrès Niedercorn	National Division	
16		Luxembourg-Cents	2,800	Luxembourg City	Luxembourg City	Division of Honour	
17		Stade François Trausch	2,600	Mamer	FC Mamer 32	Division of Honour	
18		Stade Jos Nosbaum	2,558	Dudelange	F91 Dudelange	National Division	
19		Stade Municipal, Pétange	2,400	Pétange	Union Titus Pétange	Division of Honour	
20		Stade Am Deich	2,020	Ettelbruck	Etzella Ettelbruck	National Division	
21		Stade Boy Konen	2,000	Cessange	No tenant	–	
22		VictoriArena	1,500	Rosport	FC Victoria Rosport	National Division	
23		Stade Fernand Weber	1,000	Canach	Jeunesse Canach	Division of Honour	
24		Stade An Der Trell	1,000	Erpeldange	FC Erpeldange 72	1. Division Series 1	

== Former stadiums ==
Image	Stadium	Capacity	City	Former team	Ref / Notes
	Stade Municipal (Oberkorn)	10,000	Oberkorn	CS Oberkorn	It was demolished in 2011
	Stade Géitz	2,000	Wiltz	Wiltz 71	It was demolished
	Stade um Bëchel	1,000	Hautcharage	UN Käerjéng 97	It was demolished

== See also ==
- Lists of stadiums
