= 2026–27 Luxembourg Division of Honour =

Football league season in Luxembourg

Luxembourg Division of Honour
- Season: 2026–27
- Dates: 14 August 2026 – 23 May 2027
- Matches: 96
- Goals: 317 (3.3 per match)
- Biggest home win: Fola Esch 7–0 URB; 15 November 2026
- Biggest away win: Jeunesse Canach 0–6 Lorentzweiler; 4 October 2026
- Highest scoring: Bettembourg 4–5 Luxembourg City; 27 September 2026
- Longest winning run: Mamer 32 (7 matches)
- Longest unbeaten run: Mamer 32 (12 matches)
- Longest winless run: Marisca Mersch (10 matches)
- Longest losing run: Marisca Mersch (6 matches)
- All statistics correct as of 15 November 2026.

The 2025–26 Luxembourg Division of Honour is the 66th season of second-tier association football in Luxembourg. The season began on 14 August 2026, and is due to end the weekend of 23 May 2027.

== Teams and locations ==
Team	Location	Stadium	Capacity	2025–26 position
Avenir Beggen	Beggen	Stade rue Henri Dunant	4,830	1st (1. Division Series 1) ▲
The Belval Belvaux	Belvaux	Stade FC The Belval	2,000	10th
Berdenia Berbourg	Berbourg	Stade Renert	800	11th
Bettembourg	Bettembourg	Stade Municipal Bettembourg	700	5th
Fola Esch	Esch-sur-Alzette	Stade Émile Mayrisch	7,826	8th
Jeunesse Canach	Canach	Stade Rue de Lenningen	1,000	13th (National Division) ▼
Koeppchen Wormeldange	Wormeldange	Stade Am Ga	1,000	14th
Lorentzweiler	Lorentzweiler	Terrain rue de Hunsdorf	1,000	13th
Luxembourg City	Luxembourg City	Luxembourg-Cents	2,800	6th
Mamer 32	Mamer	Stade François Trausch	2,600	14th (National Division) ▼
Marisca Mersch	Mersch	Terrain Schintgespesch	1,000	12th
Mondercange	Mondercange	Stade Communal	3,300	9th
Rodange 91	Rodange	Stade Joseph Philippart	3,400	16th (National Division) ▼
Union Titus Pétange	Pétange	Stade Municipal, Pétange	2,400	15th (National Division) ▼
URB	Remich	Stade Op der Millen	1,000	1st (1. Division Series 2) ▲
US Feulen	Niederfeulen	Terrain In Bertzent	1,500	7th

== League table ==
Pos	Team	Pld	W	D	L	GF	GA	GD	Pts	Promotion, qualification or relegation
1	Mamer 32	12	8	4	0	18	8	+10	28	Promotion to the Luxembourg National Division
2	Rodange 91	12	7	3	2	28	11	+17	24	Promotion to the Luxembourg National Division
3	Fola Esch	12	7	3	2	26	9	+17	24	Qualification for the Luxembourg National Division play-offs
4	Lorentzweiler	12	6	5	1	24	17	+7	23	Qualification for the Luxembourg National Division play-offs
5	Union Titus Pétange	12	6	4	2	32	26	+6	22	
6	The Belval Belvaux	12	5	4	3	17	16	+1	19	
7	Bettembourg	12	5	3	4	26	18	+8	18	
8	Berbourg	12	4	4	4	20	16	+4	16	
9	Mondercange	12	4	3	5	20	23	−3	15	
10	US Feulen	12	4	2	6	20	25	−5	14	
11	Jeunesse Canach	12	4	2	6	20	29	−9	14	
12	Avenir Beggen	12	3	3	6	15	16	−1	12	
13	Luxembourg City	12	3	3	6	15	19	−4	12	Qualification for the Luxembourg Division of Honour play-offs
14	Koeppchen	12	3	2	7	17	25	−8	11	Qualification for the Luxembourg Division of Honour play-offs
15	URB	12	2	2	8	10	32	−22	8	Relegation to the Luxembourg 1. Division
16	Mersch	12	1	1	10	8	26	−18	4	Relegation to the Luxembourg 1. Division

Updated to match(es) played on 15 November 2026. Source:
Rules for classification: 1) Points; 2) Goal difference; 3) Goals for; 4) Matches won; 5) Head-to-head points; 6) Head-to-head goal difference; 7) Head-to-head goals scored; 8) Play-off.

== Results ==
Home \ Away	AVB	BVL	BER	BET	FOL	JEC	KOE	LOR	LUX	MAM	MER	MND	ROD	UTP	URB	FEU
Avenir Beggen	—	0–2			1–2	2–0		1–2	0–0	1–2						1–2
The Belval Belvaux		—					1–0	1–1		1–2		2–2			2–0	0–0
Berbourg	1–1		—	3–2	0–1				1–2		4–1			2–3		
Bettembourg	0–2	4–1		—		1–1	2–1		4–5						4–0	
Fola Esch		3–0			—	2–0			1–2	0–0		6–2			7–0	
Jeunesse Canach		1–3				—	3–2	0–6	1–0	3–3		4–0				
Koeppchen	2–1		1–1				—				2–1	1–4	0–2			1–4
Lorentzweiler			3–3	2–1	1–0			—					1–5	3–3		3–2
Luxembourg City							3–3	0–1	—	1–2		0–1			0–1	
Mamer 32			1–0					0–0		—	1–0		2–0	2–2		2–0
Mersch	1–3	0–1		0–3					1–1		—			2–1	0–1	
Mondercange			0–1	1–3				1–1			3–0	—	0–1			3–1
Rodange 91			1–1	1–1	2–2	4–0					3–1		—	2–3		
Union Titus Pétange		3–3			0–0	5–3	2–1		3–1					—	4–2	
URB	2–2		0–3				1–3			0–1		3–3	0–3		—	
US Feulen				1–1	1–2	1–4					3–1		0–4	5–3		—

Updated to match(es) played on 15 November 2026. Source:
Legend: Blue = home team win; Yellow = draw; Red = away team win.
For upcoming matches, an "a" indicates there is an article about the rivalry between the two participants.

== Luxembourg Division of Honour play-offs ==
The thirteenth and fourteenth-placed teams will face the second placed teams from the 1. Division for the final two places in the 2027–28 Luxembourg Division of Honour.
