= 2025–26 Luxembourg Division of Honour =

Football league season in Luxembourg

Luxembourg Division of Honour
- Season: 2025-26
- Dates: August 2025 - May 2026

The 2025–26 Luxembourg Division of Honour is the 65th season of second-tier association football in Luxembourg.

== Team changes ==
The following teams changed division since the 2024–25 season:

=== To Division of Honour ===
Promoted from 1. Division

- Lorentzweiler
- The Belval Belvaux

Relegated from National Division

- FC Wiltz 71
- SC Bettembourg
- CS Fola Esch
- FC Mondercange

=== From Division of Honour ===
Promoted to National Division

- Mamer 32
- Bissen
- Jeunesse Canach
- Käerjéng 97

Relegated to 1. Division

- Avenir Beggen
- Sandweiler

== Teams and locations ==
Team	Location	Stadium	Capacity	2024–25 position
Alisontia Steinsel	Steinsel	Stade Henri Bausch	1,500	10th
The Belval Belvaux	Belvaux	Stade FC The Belval	2,000	1st (1. Division Series 1) ▲
Berdenia Berbourg	Berbourg	Stade Renert	800	9th
Bettembourg	Bettembourg	Stade Municipal Bettembourg	700	14th (National Division) ▼
Fola Esch	Esch-sur-Alzette	Stade Émile Mayrisch	7,826	15th (National Division) ▼
Etzella Ettelbruck	Ettelbruck	Stade Am Deich	2,020	8th
Koeppchen Wormeldange	Wormeldange	Stade Am Ga	1,000	14th
Lorentzweiler	Lorentzweiler	Terrain rue de Hunsdorf	1,000	1st (1. Division Series 2) ▲
Luxembourg City	Luxembourg City	Luxembourg-Cents	2,800	5th
Marisca Mersch	Mersch	Terrain Schintgespesch	1,000	6th
Mondercange	Mondercange	Stade Communal	3,300	16th (National Division) ▼
Résidence Walferdange	Walferdange	Stade Prince Henri	1,000	7th
Schifflange 95	Schifflange	Stade Rue Denis Netgen	3,100	13th
US Feulen	Niederfeulen	Terrain In Bertzent	1,500	12th
US Rumelange	Rumelange	Stade Municipal	2,950	11th
Wiltz 71	Wiltz	Stade Am Pëtz	3,000	13th (National Division) ▼

== League table ==
Pos	Team	Pld	W	D	L	GF	GA	GD	Pts	Promotion, qualification or relegation
1	US Rumelange (C, P)	30	16	6	8	68	37	+31	54	Promotion to the Luxembourg National Division
2	Etzella Ettelbruck (P)	30	16	5	9	59	53	+6	53	Promotion to the Luxembourg National Division
3	Wiltz 71 (P)	30	15	7	8	57	33	+24	52	Qualification for the Luxembourg National Division play-offs
4	Walferdange (P)	30	16	4	10	48	43	+5	52	Qualification for the Luxembourg National Division play-offs
5	Bettembourg	30	15	6	9	63	41	+22	51	
6	Luxembourg City	30	15	6	9	70	53	+17	51	
7	US Feulen	30	15	4	11	52	42	+10	49	
8	Fola Esch	30	14	6	10	55	41	+14	48	
9	Mondercange	30	13	5	12	47	54	−7	44	
10	The Belval Belvaux	30	12	6	12	51	51	0	42	
11	Berbourg	30	12	5	13	46	41	+5	41	
12	Mersch	30	11	5	14	53	62	−9	38	
13	Lorentzweiler (O)	30	9	7	14	43	62	−19	34	Qualification for the Luxembourg Division of Honour play-offs
14	Koeppchen (O)	30	8	4	18	36	57	−21	28	Qualification for the Luxembourg Division of Honour play-offs
15	Schifflange 95 (R)	30	6	6	18	34	64	−30	24	Relegation to the Luxembourg 1. Division
16	Steinsel (R)	30	5	2	23	31	79	−48	17	Relegation to the Luxembourg 1. Division

(C) Champions; (O) Play-off winners; (P) Promoted; (R) Relegated

== Luxembourg Division of Honour play-offs ==
The thirteenth and fourteenth-placed teams will each faced the second placed teams from the 1. Division for the final two places in the 2026–27 Luxembourg Division of Honour.

27 May 2025	Lorentzweiler	3–1	Jeunesse Schieren	Kehlen
19:30	Martins 41'; Furtdao 57'; Fonseca 69'; Correia (red card) 83'	Report	Antunes 28'	Stadium: Stade Albert Berchem

2 June 2025	Koeppchen	2–1	Grevenmacher	Berbourg
19:30	Schmit 4'; Touré 17'	Report	Almeida 53'	Stadium: Stade Rénert
