= 2018–19 Luxembourg Division of Honour =

Luxembourg Division of Honour
- Season: 2018–19
- Dates: 19 August 2018 – 19 May 2019
- Matches: 7
- Goals: 16 (2.29 per match)
- All statistics correct as of 3 January 2019.

The 2018–19 Luxembourg Division of Honour is the 58th season of second-tier association football in Luxembourg. The season began on 19 August 2018 and will end on 25 May 2019.

== Teams ==
Etzella Ettelbruck and Rumelange were promoted to the Luxembourg National Division at the end of the previous season. They were replaced by Rodange 91 and Esch, who finished in the bottom two positions of the 2017–18 Luxembourg National Division. Norden 02, Grevenmacher, and Union 05 Kayl-Tétange were relegated at the end of the previous season and were replaced by Atert Bissen, Jeunesse Junglinster, and Koeppchen Wormeldange, who earned promotion from the Luxembourg 1. Division.

Location of the 2018–19 Luxembourg National Division teams

Team	Venue	Capacity
72 Erpeldange	An der Trell	1,000
Jeunesse Canach	Stade Rue de Lenningen	1,000
Käerjeng	Stade um Bëchel	1,000
Mamer 32	Stade François Trausch	2,600
Mertert-Wasserbillig	Stade de la Sûre	1,800
Blue Boys Muhlenbach	Stade Mathias Mamer	1,100
Sandweiler	Stade Norbert Hübsch	2,000
Swift Hesperange	Stade Alphonse Theis	3,058
Wiltz	Stade Géitz	2,000
FC Atert Bissen	Terrain Bousbierg	1,000
FC Rodange 91	Stade Joseph Philippart	3,400
FC Jeunesse Junglinster	Terrain Route de Luxembourg	1,500
FC Koeppchen Wormeldange	Stade Am Ga	1,000
US Esch	Stade Lankhelz	1,500

== League table ==
Pos	Team	Pld	W	D	L	GF	GA	GD	Pts	Qualification or relegation
1	Rodange 91	26	19	4	3	58	18	+40	61	Promotion to the Luxembourg National Division
2	Blue Boys Muhlenbach	26	18	5	3	55	25	+30	59	Promotion to the Luxembourg National Division
3	Swift Hesperange	26	18	1	7	73	27	+46	55	Qualification for the promotion play-offs
4	US Esch	26	16	4	6	47	28	+19	52	
5	Kaerjeng	26	12	8	6	47	31	+16	44	
6	Wiltz	26	11	6	9	45	34	+11	39	
7	Union Mertert-Wasserbillig	26	9	8	9	41	41	0	35	
8	Mamer 32	26	9	3	14	41	59	−18	30	
9	Jeunesse Junglinster	26	7	6	13	25	42	−17	27	
10	Jeunesse Canach	26	5	11	10	42	45	−3	26	
11	72 Erpeldange	26	7	5	14	42	63	−21	26	Qualification for the relegation play-offs
12	Atert Bissen	26	6	7	13	31	52	−21	25	Qualification for the relegation play-offs
13	Koeppchen Wormeldange	26	3	6	17	24	65	−41	15	Relegation to the Luxembourg 1. Division
14	Sandweiler	26	4	2	20	31	72	−41	14	Relegation to the Luxembourg 1. Division

Updated to match(es) played on 22 May 2019. Source:
Rules for classification: 1) Points; 2) Goal difference; 3) Matches won; 4) Head-to-head points; 5) Head-to-head goal difference; 6) Head-to-head goals scored; 7) Play-off.

== Results ==
Each team plays every other team in the league, home-and-away, for a total of 26 matches each.

Home \ Away	SWI	ROD	MUH	KAE	ESC	WIL	UMW	JJU	ATE	JCA	MAM	SAN	KOE	ERP
Swift Hesperange	—			3–2		1–1	2–0		3–2		3–0		5–0	3–1
Rodange 91	3–2	—	1–2	1–1			5–1		6–0				1–0	4–1
Blue Boys Muhlenbach			—		1–2	2–1	1–1	0–2	3–2		3–0	3–0		
Käerjeng			2–2	—	0–1	4–0	0–0				3–1			3–0
Esch	1–0	0–1			—			2–0		0–0	2–0	0–0		
Wiltz		1–0			0–0	—		3–2		2–1	3–0	5–1		
Union Mertert-Wasserbillig					3–1	2–2	—	1–1	1–3	2–2	0–0	4–1		
Jeunesse Junglinster	3–4	1–1	1–2	1–2				—	1–1				3–0	3–4
Atert Bissen				0–3	1–2	2–1		1–1	—		2–6		5–1	
Jeunesse Canach										—				
Mamer 32	1–6	0–3						1–2		3–0	—	2–3	0–2	
Sandweiler	1–2	1–4		0–2					0–2	1–3		—	1–1	4–0
Koeppchen Wormeldange			1–2	0–0	2–2	1–1	0–5						—	2–2
72 Erpeldange			1–3		0–2	2–1	0–1	2–2	0–2		2–5			—

Updated to match(es) played on 3 January 2019. Source:
Legend: Blue = home team win; Yellow = draw; Red = away team win.

== See also ==
- 2018–19 Luxembourg National Division
- 2018–19 Luxembourg Cup
