= 2025–26 Luxembourg National Division =

Luxembourg National Division
- Season: 2025–26
- Dates: 3 August 2025 – 23 May 2026
- Champions: Atert Bissen
- Relegated: Union Titus Pétange; Rodange 91; Jeunesse Canach; Mamer 32
- UEFA Champions League: Atert Bissen
- Conference League: Differdange 03; Mondorf-les-Bains; UNA Strassen
- Matches: 240
- Goals: 686 (2.86 per match)
- Top goalscorer: Roman Ferber (21 Goals)
- Biggest home win: Atert Bissen 7–1 Hostert; 26 October 2025
- Biggest away win: Rodange 91 0–6 Differdange 03; 22 February 2026
- Highest scoring: F91 Dudelange 6–3 UT Pétange; 30 November 2025
- Longest winning run: US Mondorf (7 matches)
- Longest unbeaten run: Differdange 03 and Atert Bissen (13 matches)
- Longest winless run: Mamer 32 (11 matches)
- Longest losing run: Mamer 32, UT Pétange, and Jeunesse Canach (6 matches)
- All statistics correct as of 23 May 2026.

The 2025–26 Luxembourg National Division season, also known as BGL Ligue, for sponsorship reasons, was the 112th of top-tier association football in Luxembourg. The season began on 3 August 2025 and concluded on 23 May 2026, and was won by Atert Bissen.

== Teams ==
Bettembourg (relegated after a single year), FC Mondercange (relegated after 3 years), CS Fola Esch (relegated after 17 years), Wiltz 71 (relegated after 5 years) were relegated at the end of the previous season, while Mamer 32 (promoted after a 19-year absence), Käerjéng '97 (promoted after a single year absence), Atert Bissen (promoted for the first time), and Jeunesse Canach (promoted after an 8-year absence) were promoted from the Luxembourg Division of Honour.

Differdange 03 entered the season as defending league champions.

=== Stadia and locations ===
Locations of the 2025–26 Luxembourg National Division teams
Locations of the 2025–26 Luxembourg National Division teams (Esch Canton)

| Team | Town | Stadium | Capacity |
|---|---|---|---|
| Atert Bissen | Bissen | Terrain ZAC Klengbousbierg | 1,500 |
| Differdange 03 | Differdange | Municipal Stadium vun der Stad Déifferdeng | 3,500 |
| Dudelange | Dudelange | Stade Jos Nosbaum | 2,558 |
| Hostert | Hostert | Stade Jos Becker | 1,500 |
| Jeunesse Canach | Canach | Stade Rue de Lenningen | 1,000 |
| Jeunesse Esch | Esch-sur-Alzette | Stade de la Frontière | 4,000 |
| Käerjeng '97 | Bascharage | Stade Um Dribbel | 2,500 |
| Mamer 32 | Mamer | Stade François Trausch | 2,600 |
| US Mondorf-les-Bains | Mondorf-les-Bains | Stade John Grün | 3,600 |
| FC Progrès Niederkorn | Niederkorn | Stade Jos Haupert | 2,800 |
| Racing FC Union Luxembourg | Luxembourg | Stade Achille Hammerel | 5,814 |
| FC Rodange 91 | Rodange | Stade Joseph Philippart | 3,400 |
| FC Swift Hesperange | Hesperange | Stade Alphonse Theis | 3,058 |
| FC UNA Strassen | Strassen | 3 August - 5 October: Complexe Sportif Jean Wirtz | 1,500 |
| FC UNA Strassen | Strassen | 27 October onwards: Stade An de Millewisen | 2,500 |
| Union Titus Pétange | Pétange | Stade Municipal | 2,400 |
| FC Victoria Rosport | Rosport | VictoriArena | 2,500 |

== League table ==
| Pos | Team | Pld | W | D | L | GF | GA | GD | Pts | Qualification or relegation |
|---|---|---|---|---|---|---|---|---|---|---|
| 1 | Atert Bissen (C) | 30 | 20 | 5 | 5 | 70 | 27 | +43 | 65 | Qualification for the Champions League first qualifying round |
| 2 | Differdange 03 | 30 | 19 | 8 | 3 | 63 | 22 | +41 | 65 | Qualification for the Conference League first qualifying round (Note: The 2025–26 Luxembourg Cup winners (Differdange 03) qualify for the Conference League first qualifying round. If the cup winners finish in the top three, the third Conference League berth would be passed to the fourth-placed team.) |
| 3 | Mondorf-les-Bains | 30 | 19 | 3 | 8 | 51 | 24 | +27 | 60 | Qualification for the Conference League first qualifying round |
| 4 | UNA Strassen | 30 | 17 | 7 | 6 | 57 | 26 | +31 | 58 | Qualification for the Conference League first qualifying round |
| 5 | F91 Dudelange | 30 | 17 | 7 | 6 | 59 | 38 | +21 | 58 | |
| 6 | Jeunesse Esch | 30 | 10 | 10 | 10 | 35 | 34 | +1 | 40 | |
| 7 | Racing Union | 30 | 11 | 7 | 12 | 48 | 50 | −2 | 40 | |
| 8 | Käerjeng 97 | 30 | 11 | 5 | 14 | 43 | 48 | −5 | 38 | |
| 9 | Hostert | 30 | 10 | 6 | 14 | 35 | 56 | −21 | 36 | |
| 10 | Victoria Rosport | 30 | 10 | 5 | 15 | 33 | 50 | −17 | 35 | |
| 11 | Progrès Niederkorn | 30 | 9 | 7 | 14 | 44 | 47 | −3 | 34 | |
| 12 | Swift Hesperange | 30 | 9 | 5 | 16 | 31 | 46 | −15 | 32 | |
| 13 | Jeunesse Canach (R) | 30 | 9 | 4 | 17 | 29 | 44 | −15 | 31 | Qualification for the Luxembourg National Division play-offs |
| 14 | Mamer 32 (R) | 30 | 8 | 5 | 17 | 33 | 59 | −26 | 29 | Qualification for the Luxembourg National Division play-offs |
| 15 | Union Titus Pétange (R) | 30 | 6 | 7 | 17 | 26 | 49 | −23 | 25 | Relegation to the Luxembourg Division of Honour |
| 16 | Rodange (R) | 30 | 6 | 7 | 17 | 28 | 65 | −37 | 25 | Relegation to the Luxembourg Division of Honour |

Source: UEFA, Flashscore
Rules for classification: 1) Points; 2) Goal difference; 3) Matches won; 4) Head-to-head points; 5) Head-to-head goal difference; 6) Head-to-head goals scored; 7) Play-off.
(C) Champions; (R) Relegated

== Results ==
| Home \ Away | DIF | BIS | MON | UNA | DUD | HOS | JEC | JEU | KAE | MAM | PRO | RAC | ROD | SWI | UTP | VIC |
|---|---|---|---|---|---|---|---|---|---|---|---|---|---|---|---|---|
| Differdange 03 | — | 1–0 | 0–1 | 0–0 | 2–2 | 3–2 | 3–1 | 1–1 | 2–0 | 5–0 | 1–1 | 5–1 | 2–2 | 3–0 | 1–0 | 3–0 |
| Atert Bissen | 1–0 | — | 0–2 | 3–1 | 2–0 | 7–1 | 2–1 | 0–0 | 1–0 | 2–2 | 2–0 | 3–0 | 3–2 | 2–0 | 2–0 | 5–0 |
| Mondorf-les-Bains | 1–3 | 2–1 | — | 0–1 | 3–1 | 4–0 | 3–1 | 1–1 | 2–0 | 3–1 | 1–0 | 1–3 | 4–0 | 1–0 | 1–0 | 4–0 |
| UNA Strassen | 3–1 | 3–3 | 0–0 | — | 1–4 | 4–0 | 2–0 | 3–0 | 4–0 | 2–0 | 2–0 | 1–0 | 5–0 | 3–0 | 3–0 | 0–0 |
| F91 Dudelange | 0–0 | 4–2 | 1–1 | 1–1 | — | 3–1 | 0–1 | 4–0 | 1–0 | 1–3 | 4–3 | 1–1 | 3–0 | 3–1 | 6–3 | 1–2 |
| Hostert | 0–1 | 0–3 | 2–1 | 1–0 | 1–1 | — | 2–1 | 1–3 | 0–2 | 4–2 | 1–5 | 0–1 | 0–0 | 1–1 | 2–0 | 1–4 |
| Jeunesse Canach | 0–0 | 0–5 | 1–0 | 3–3 | 0–1 | 0–0 | — | 1–0 | 1–3 | 2–3 | 1–0 | 1–3 | 1–2 | 0–2 | 0–1 | 2–1 |
| Jeunesse Esch | 0–1 | 1–1 | 2–0 | 0–2 | 0–1 | 2–3 | 0–1 | — | 1–1 | 0–1 | 2–1 | 3–2 | 4–0 | 1–1` | 1–1 | 1–0 |
| Käerjeng 97 | 1–1 | 1–2 | 1–3 | 1–0 | 2–3 | 2–2 | 1–0 | 0–2 | — | 4–2 | 3–4 | 2–5 | 3–1 | 0–3 | 3–0 | 2–0 |
| Mamer 32 | 1–4 | 1–4 | 0–1 | 0–1 | 1–2 | 1–0 | 0–0 | 2–1 | 0–1 | — | 1–2 | 3–2 | 0–2 | 1–2 | 1–1 | 0–2 |
| Progrès Niederkorn | 2–3 | 1–1 | 1–0 | 0–1 | 2–4 | 2–1 | 1–2 | 0–2 | 2–2 | 1–1 | — | 1–3 | 1–0 | 1–1 | 4–1 | 0–1 |
| Racing Union | 0–2 | 0–5 | 0–2 | 1–2 | 1–2 | 0–0 | 1–3 | 1–1 | 1–1 | 5–2 | 2–2 | — | 6–1 | 1–0 | 0–0 | 1–0 |
| Rodange | 0–6 | 0–3 | 1–3 | 2–1 | 1–2 | 1–2 | 1–4 | 3–3 | 0–3 | 1–1 | 0–0 | 1–1 | — | 2–0 | 0–1 | 3–1 |
| Swift Hesperange | 1–5 | 1–2 | 1–2 | 4–2 | 0–3 | 0–1 | 1–0 | 0–1 | 2–1 | 0–1 | 1–4 | 0–1 | 1–0 | — | 0–0 | 3–0 |
| Union Titus Pétange | 0–1 | 2–3 | 0–3 | 0–4 | 3–0 | 0–2 | 1–0 | 0–0 | 1–2 | 1–2 | 1–2 | 2–1 | 1–1 | 2–3 | — | 1–1 |
| Victoria Rosport | 0–2 | 1–0 | 1–0 | 2–2 | 0–0 | 2–4 | 2–1 | 1–2 | 2–1 | 3–0 | 2–1 | 3–4 | 0–1 | 2–2 | 0–3 | — |

Source: Flashscore
Legend: Blue = home team win; Yellow = draw; Red = away team win.

== Luxembourg National Division play-offs ==
The thirteenth and fourteenth-placed teams will face the fourth and third-placed teams from the 2025–26 Luxembourg Division of Honour for the final two places in the 2026–27 Luxembourg National Division.

| 31 May 2026 | Mamer 32 | 0–0 (a.e.t.) (4–5 p) | Wiltz 71 | Ettelbruck |
| 19:00 | | Report | Reciputi (red card) 68' | Stadium: Stade Am Deich; Attendance: 2,371 |
| | Penalties |
| | Ezan (penalty scored); Muric (penalty missed); Chibani (penalty scored); Bahović (penalty scored); Montout (penalty scored) | | (penalty scored) Cavagnera; (penalty scored) Schroeder; (penalty scored) Franco; (penalty scored) Philipps; (penalty scored) Raddas |

| 1 June 2026 | Jeunesse Canach | 1–1 (a.e.t.) (5–6 p) | Résidence Walferdange | Beggen |
| 19:30 | Duarte 45+1' | Report | Da Silva 75' | Stadium: Stade de Beggen |
| | Penalties |
| | Conceição (penalty scored); Parreira (penalty scored); Aguiar (penalty scored); Amofa (penalty scored); Laborie (penalty missed); Gomes (penalty scored); Rouffignac (penalty missed) | | (penalty scored) Monteiro; (penalty scored) Rosário; (penalty scored) Da Silva; (penalty scored) Medes; (penalty missed) Sow; (penalty scored) El Moutawakil; (penalty scored) Droues |

== Statistics ==
=== Top scorers ===
As of 23 May 2026

| Rank | Player | Club | Goals |
|---|---|---|---|
| 1 | (Madagascar) Roman Ferber | Atert Bissen | 21 |
| 2 | (France) Nicolas Perez | UNA Strassen | 15 |
| 3 | (Brazil) Matheus | UNA Strassen | 13 |
| 4 | (Morocco) Samir Hadji | Differdange 03 | 12 |
| 4 | (Morocco) Khalid Abi | Atert Bissen | 12 |
| 6 | (Guinea-Bissau) Agostinho | F91 Dudelange | 11 |
| 6 | (Luxembourg) Kenan Avdusinovic | Progrès Niederkorn | 11 |
| 6 | (France) Yannis Bellali | Käerjeng 97 | 11 |
| 6 | (France) Diogo Fernandes | US Hostert | 11 |
| 6 | (Cameroon) Boris Mfoumou | Differdange 03 | 11 |
| 6 | (Luxembourg) Farid Ikene | Racing Union | 11 |
