= 2013–14 Luxembourg National Division =

Luxembourg National Division
- Season: 2013–14
- Champions: F91 Dudelange
- Relegated: Racing FC; Swift Hesperange; RM Hamm Benfica
- Champions League: F91 Dudelange
- Europa League: Fola Esch; FC Differdange 03; Jeunesse Esch
- Matches: 182
- Top goalscorer: (Bosnia and Herzegovina) Sanel Ibrahimović (22 goals)
- Biggest home win: Etzella Ettelbruck 8–3 Wiltz
- Biggest away win: Etzella Ettelbruck 1–4 F91 Dudelange
- Highest scoring: Etzella Ettelbruck 8–3 Wiltz

The 2013–14 Luxembourg National Division was the centennial season of top-tier football in Luxembourg. It began on 3 August 2013 and ended on 18 May 2014. Fola Esch were the defending champions having won their sixth league championship in the previous season.

== Stadia and locations ==
Location of the 2013–14 Luxembourg National Division teams

Team	Venue	Capacity
FC Differdange 03	Stade du Thillenberg	7,830
F91 Dudelange	Stade Jos Nosbaum	2,600
FC Etzella Ettelbruck	Stade Am Deich	2,650
CS Fola Esch	Stade Émile Mayrisch	3,900
CS Grevenmacher	Op Flohr Stadion	4,000
FC Jeunesse Canach	Stade Rue de Lenningen	1,000
Jeunesse Esch	Stade de la Frontière	5,400
UN Käerjeng 97	Stade um Bëchel	1,000
US Rumelange	Stade Municipal	2,950
FC Progrès Niederkorn	Stade Jos Haupert	4,830
Racing FC Union Luxembourg	Stade Achille Hammerel	5,814
FC RM Hamm Benfica	Luxembourg-Cents	2,800
FC Swift Hesperange	Stade Alphonse Theis	3,058
FC Wiltz 71	Stade Géitz	2,000

== League table ==
Pos	Team	Pld	W	D	L	GF	GA	GD	Pts	Qualification or relegation
1	F91 Dudelange (C)	26	19	4	3	64	21	+43	61	Qualification to Champions League second qualifying round
2	Fola Esch	26	18	5	3	53	19	+34	59	Qualification to Europa League first qualifying round
3	Differdange 03	26	17	0	9	53	23	+30	51	Qualification to Europa League first qualifying round
4	Jeunesse Esch	26	11	10	5	47	35	+12	43	Qualification to Europa League first qualifying round
5	Progrès Niederkorn	26	11	9	6	33	26	+7	42	
6	Etzella Ettelbruck	26	9	5	12	44	46	−2	32	
7	UN Käerjeng 97	26	9	5	12	32	34	−2	32	
8	Grevenmacher	26	8	8	10	27	34	−7	32	
9	Wiltz	26	9	4	13	40	53	−13	31	
10	Jeunesse Canach	26	8	6	12	27	42	−15	30	
11	Rumelange	26	6	10	10	25	36	−11	28	
12	RM Hamm Benfica (R)	26	6	6	14	31	46	−15	24	Qualification to Relegation play-offs
13	Swift Hesperange (R)	26	4	8	14	22	51	−29	20	Relegation to Luxembourg Division of Honour
14	Racing FC (R)	26	4	6	16	22	54	−32	18	Relegation to Luxembourg Division of Honour

Source: Soccerway
Rules for classification: 1) points; 2) goal difference; 3) number of goals scored. Winners of the 2013–14 Luxembourg Cup qualify for 2014–15 UEFA Europa League.
(C) Champions; (R) Relegated

== Results ==
Home \ Away	DIF	DUD	ETZ	FOL	GRE	JEC	JEU	KÄE	PRO	RAC	RMH	RUM	SWI	WIL
Differdange 03		0–1	3–0	1–2	1–0	2–0	4–0	3–0	1–2	3–0	3–0	1–0	5–0	2–1
F91 Dudelange	2–1		2–0	3–0	2–0	1–2	1–1	1–1	0–2	5–0	5–0	3–0	3–1	2–1
Etzella Ettelbruck	1–3	1–4		2–3	1–2	5–0	1–0	0–3	1–1	1–4	2–2	3–0	2–0	8–3
Fola Esch	3–0	1–2	3–0		2–1	1–1	4–1	2–0	4–0	1–0	3–0	1–1	2–0	2–0
Grevenmacher	2–0	1–2	0–0	0–1		0–2	1–4	0–2	0–0	1–1	1–0	2–2	1–0	0–2
Jeunesse Canach	0–1	4–3	1–3	0–2	0–2		2–2	0–1	2–0	2–1	1–3	1–1	2–0	1–0
Jeunesse Esch	1–0	2–2	2–2	1–1	0–0	3–0		2–1	2–0	6–3	1–2	1–0	3–1	3–1
UN Käerjeng 97	1–2	0–2	3–1	0–4	1–1	1–1	0–0		0–2	6–0	1–2	0–0	0–4	2–0
Progrès Niederkorn	2–4	0–3	0–0	1–2	4–0	3–0	1–0	1–0		1–1	1–1	4–0	1–1	1–1
Racing FC	0–2	0–0	1–5	0–0	1–4	2–1	1–2	1–3	0–1		2–1	0–0	0–0	1–3
RM Hamm Benfica	0–2	2–3	3–0	1–3	1–1	0–1	4–4	2–0	0–1	2–0		0–1	1–1	1–1
Rumelange	1–0	0–2	1–2	1–0	2–3	1–1	1–1	0–1	1–1	0–2	4–2		2–0	1–0
Swift Hesperange	0–7	0–3	1–0	0–3	3–3	2–2	1–1	0–3	2–2	2–0	2–0	1–1		0–2
Wiltz	4–2	1–7	1–3	3–3	0–1	2–0	1–4	3–2	0–1	2–1	2–1	4–4	2–0	

Source: Soccerway
Legend: Blue = home team win; Yellow = draw; Red = away team win.

== Relegation play-offs ==
24 May 2014
17:30 CET

RM Hamm Benfica	0–0 (a.e.t.)	Mondorf-les-Bains
Penalties
	4–5

Stade Alphonse Theis, Hesperange

== Top goalscorers ==
As of 26 April 2014.

Rank	Player	Club	Goals
1	(Bosnia and Herzegovina) Sanel Ibrahimović	Jeunesse Esch	22
2	(France) Julien Jahier	F91 Dudelange	21
3	(Bosnia and Herzegovina) Edis Osmanović	Wiltz 71	15
4	(Morocco) Omar Er Rafik	Differdange 03	13
5	(France) Samir Hadji	Fola Esch	12
5	(Luxembourg) Stefano Bensi	Fola Esch	12
5	(France) Julien Hornuss	Fola Esch	12
8	(Portugal) Tino Barbosa	US Rumelange	11
8	(France) Gauthier Caron	Differdange 03	11
10	(Belgium) Kevin Cossalter	Wiltz 71	10
10	(Armenia) Aleksandre Karapetian	CS Grevenmacher	10

== See also ==
- 2013–14 Luxembourg Cup
