= 2023–24 Luxembourg Cup =

Tournament details
- Country: Luxembourg

Final positions
- Champions: Progrès Niederkorn
- Runners-up: Swift Hesperange

The 2023–24 Luxembourg Cup, also known as Loterie Nationale Coupe de Luxembourg, for sponsorship reasons, was the 99th year of the football knockout tournament in Luxembourg. The winners qualified for the 2024–25 Conference League second qualifying round.

Progrès Niederkorn won the cup on 9 May 2024 (their fifth Luxembourg Cup win), defeating Swift Hesperange 3–1 on penalties after a 1–1 draw.

== Preliminary round ==
Team 1	Score	Team 2
6 September 2023
Alliance Äischdall	3–0	Ehlerange
Bourscheid	1–6	Steinfort
Jeunesse Biwer	4–3	Clemency
Minerva Lintgen	5–1	Vinesca Ehnen
Rambrouch	1–0	Boevange/Attert
Red Boys Aspelt	0–4	Sporting Bertrange

== First round ==
Team 1	Score	Team 2
9 September 2023
Jeunesse Schieren	9–3	Colmar-Berg
Pratzerthal-Redange	2–4	Atert Bissen
Reisdorf	1–2	Blo Weiss Itzig
10 September 2023
Alliance Äischdall	1–3	URB
Biekerech	0–5	Berdorf Consdorf
Brouch	1–1 (a.e.t.) (6–7 p)	Tricolore Gasperich
Claravallis Clervaux	1–3	Minerva Lintgen
Ell	1–3	Mertzig
Erpeldange 72	5–1	Munsbach
Esch	3–4	Olympia Christnach
Excelsior Grevels	0–5	Oberkorn
Heiderscheid/Eschdorf	2–1	Kiischpelt Wilwerwiltz
Hosingen	1–4	Jeunesse Useldange
Jeunesse Biwer	4–6	Kehlen
Jeunesse Gilsdorf	1–2	Red Star Merl-Belair
Käerch-Simmer	2–1	Echternach
Les Aiglons Dalheim	0–3	Bastendorf
Miniere Lasauvage	1–4	Feulen
Moutfort	2–5	Sandweiler
Noertzange	4–5	RM Hamm Benfica
Orania Vianden	3–3 (a.e.t.) (3–0 p)	Green Boys 77 Harlange-Tarchamps
Racing Troisvierges	2–1	Syra
Rambrouch	1–6	Jeunesse Junglinster
Red-Black-Egalité	1–2	ALSS Luxembourg
Sanem	3–2	Rupensia Lusitanos
Schengen	1–0	Luna Oberkorn
Schouweiler	1–0	Folschette
Sporting Bertrange	3–6	Kopstal 33
Steinfort	6–0	Les Ardoisiers Perlé
The Belval Belvaux	5–3	Union 05 Kayl-Tétange
Union Mertert	0–3	Young Boys Diekirch
Wincrange	1–4	Norden 02

== Second round ==
Team 1	Score	Team 2
30 September 2023
Bastendorf	0–1	Fola Esch
Schengen	1–5	Jeunesse Esch
Steinfort	0–1	Bettembourg
1 October 2023
ALSS Luxembourg	2–1	Avenir Beggen
Atert Bissen	3–5	Union Titus Pétange
Berdorf Consdorf	3–3 (a.e.t.) (5–6 p)	Rumelange
Blo Weiss Itzig	0–4	Marisca Mersch
Erpeldange 72	1–0	Medernach
Feulen	0–4	F91 Dudelange
Heiderscheid/Eschdorf	0–11	Progrès Niederkorn
Jeunesse Junglinster	0–4	Wiltz 71
Jeunesse Schieren	0–5	Käerjéng 97
Jeunesse Useldange	1–3	Mondercange
Käerch-Simmer	1–3	Koeppchen Wormeldange
Kehlen	2–2 (a.e.t.) (1–4 p)	Rodange 91
Kopstal 33	0–2	Grevenmacher
Mertzig	1–4	Mamer 32
Minerva Lintgen	1–3	Hostert
Norden 02	1–0	Victoria Rosport
Oberkorn	1–4	Lorentzweiler
Olympia Christnach	0–5	UNA Strassen
Orania Vianden	0–2	Etzella Ettelbruck
Racing Troisvierges	1–7	Alisontia Steinsel
Red Star Merl-Belair	3–0	Berdenia Berbourg
RM Hamm Benfica	1–3	Differdange 03
Sandweiler	1–2	Jeunesse Canach
Sanem	1–3	Racing Union Luxembourg
Schouweiler	0–3	Residence Walferdange
The Belval Belvaux	0–3	Swift Hesperange
Tricolore Gasperich	0–4	Mondorf-les-Bains
URB	0–4	Schifflange 95
Young Boys Diekirch	0–4	Yellow Boys

== Round of 32 ==
Team 1	Score	Team 2
28 October 2023
F91 Dudelange	0–2	Differdange 03
Grevenmacher	2–4 (a.e.t.)	Yellow Boys
Mamer 32	1–2	Jeunesse Esch
29 October 2023
Alisontia Steinsel	5–1	Etzella Ettelbruck
ALSS Luxembourg	0–3	Racing Union Luxembourg
Erpeldange 72	1–8	Mondorf-les-Bains
Hostert	2–1	Union Titus Pétange
Jeunesse Canach	4–3 (a.e.t.)	Wiltz 71
Koeppchen Wormeldange	2–5	Mondercange
Norden 02	1–0	Lorentzweiler
Red Star Merl-Belair	2–3	Swift Hesperange
Residence Walferdange	3–5	Progrès Niederkorn
Rumelange	4–0	Marisca Mersch
UNA Strassen	4–3	Fola Esch
8 November 2023
Käerjéng 97	2–3	Schifflange 95
Rodange 91	3–4	Bettembourg

== Round of 16 ==
Team 1	Score	Team 2
3 April 2024
Alisontia Steinsel	1–3	Progrès Niederkorn
Bettembourg	2–3	Swift Hesperange
Hostert	1–0 (a.e.t.)	Racing Union Luxembourg
Mondercange	0–3	Differdange 03
Norden 02	1–1 (a.e.t.) (2–4 p)	UNA Strassen
Rumelange	0–5	Jeunesse Esch
Schifflange 95	1–1 (a.e.t.) (2–4 p)	Mondorf-les-Bains
Yellow Boys	3–2 (a.e.t.)	Jeunesse Canach

== Quarter-finals ==
The eight round of 16 winners entered the quarter-finals.

24 April 2024	Hostert	1–2	Mondorf-les-Bains	Hostert
				Stadium: Stade Jos Becker

24 April 2024	Jeunesse Esch	0–2	Swift Hesperange	Esch-sur-Alzette
				Stadium: Stade de la Frontière

24 April 2024	Progrès Niederkorn	2–0	Differdange 03	Niederkorn
				Stadium: Stade Jos Haupert

24 April 2024	Yellow Boys	0–2	UNA Strassen	Weiler-la-Tour
				Stadium: Stade Am Dieltchen

== Semi-finals ==
The four quarter-final winners entered the semi-finals.

1 May 2024	UNA Strassen	0–2	Swift Hesperange	Strassen
				Stadium: Complexe Sportif Jean Wirtz

1 May 2024	Mondorf-les-Bains	0–2	Progrès Niederkorn	Mondorf-les-Bains
				Stadium: Stade John Grün

== Final ==
The final was held between the two semi-final winners.

9 May 2024	Swift Hesperange	1–1 (a.e.t.) (1–3 p)	Progrès Niederkorn	Luxembourg City
				Stadium: Stade de Luxembourg; Referee: Laurent Wilmes
