= 2026–27 Luxembourg National Division =

113th season of top flight football in Luxembourg

Luxembourg National Division
- Season: 2026–27
- Dates: 1 August 2026 – 23 May 2027
- Matches: 96
- Goals: 341 (3.55 per match)
- Biggest home win: Käerjeng '97 6–0 Swift Hesperange; 30 August 2026 Differdange 03 6–0 Résidence Walferdange; 11 October 2026 Racing Union 6–0 Mondorf-les-Bains; 25 October 2026
- Biggest away win: US Rumelange 0–6 Atert Bissen; 13 August 2026
- Highest scoring: Swift Hesperange 2–7 Wiltz 71; 9 August 2026
- Longest winning run: Differdange 03 (11 matches)
- Longest unbeaten run: UNA Strassen (12 matches)
- Longest winless run: Swift Hesperange (12 matches)
- Longest losing run: Swift Hesperange (12 matches)
- All statistics correct as of 31 October 2026.

The 2026–27 Luxembourg National Division season, also known as BGL Ligue for sponsorship reasons, is the 113th season of top-tier association football in Luxembourg. The season begins on 1 August 2026 and is scheduled to conclude on 23 May 2027.

== Teams ==
Union Titus Pétange (relegated after 16 seasons), Rodange 91 (relegated after 3 seasons), Jeunesse Canach and Mamer 32 (both relegated after a single season) were all relegated at the end of the previous season.

In their place were the top two teams from the Division of Honour, US Rumelange (returned after a 4-year absence) and Etzella Ettelbruck (returned after a 3-year absence), as well as the winners of the promotion playoffs, Wiltz 71 (returned after a one year absence) and Résidence Walferdange (promoted for the first time in their history).

Atert Bissen entered the season as defending league champions.

It was announced at the end of the previous season that Swift Hesperange would start the season with a 12 point deduction - 10 for outstanding tax and payments to players, and 2 for failing to eliminate negative equity.

=== Stadia and locations ===
Locations of the 2026–27 Luxembourg National Division teams
Locations of the 2026–27 Luxembourg National Division teams (Esch Canton)

Team	Town	Stadium	Capacity
Atert Bissen	Bissen	Terrain ZAC Klengbousbierg	1,500
Differdange 03	Differdange	Municipal Stadium vun der Stad Déifferdeng	3,500
Dudelange	Dudelange	Stade Jos Nosbaum	2,558
Etzella Ettelbruck	Ettelbruck	Stade Am Deich	2,020
Hostert	Hostert	Stade Jos Becker	1,500
Jeunesse Esch	Esch-sur-Alzette	Stade de la Frontière	4,000
Käerjeng '97	Bascharage	Stade Um Dribbel	2,500
US Mondorf-les-Bains	Mondorf-les-Bains	Stade John Grün	3,600
FC Progrès Niederkorn	Niederkorn	Stade Jos Haupert	2,800
Racing FC Union Luxembourg	Luxembourg	Stade Achille Hammerel	5,814
Résidence Walferdange	Walferdange	Stade Prince Henri	1,000
FC Swift Hesperange	Hesperange	Stade Alphonse Theis	3,058
FC UNA Strassen	Strassen	Stade An de Millewisen	2,500
US Rumelange	Rumelange	Stade Municipale, Rumelange	2,950
FC Victoria Rosport	Rosport	VictoriArena	2,500
Wiltz 71	Wiltz	Stade Am Pëtz	3,000

== League table ==
Pos	Team	Pld	W	D	L	GF	GA	GD	Pts	Qualification or relegation
1	UNA Strassen	13	12	1	0	26	4	+22	37	Qualification for the Champions League first qualifying round
2	Differdange 03	13	11	1	1	39	13	+26	34	Qualification for the Conference League first qualifying round
3	Atert Bissen	13	9	1	3	36	16	+20	28	
4	Mondorf-les-Bains	13	9	1	3	26	22	+4	28	
5	Racing Union	13	7	4	2	34	14	+20	25	
6	Progrès Niederkorn	13	7	2	4	23	13	+10	23	
7	Käerjeng 97	13	7	1	5	33	23	+10	22	
8	Résidence Walferdange	13	5	3	5	23	26	−3	18	
9	F91 Dudelange	13	5	2	6	22	20	+2	17	
10	Victoria Rosport	13	4	2	7	24	31	−7	14	
11	Jeunesse Esch	13	4	1	8	21	27	−6	13	
12	Hostert	13	3	3	7	20	26	−6	12	
13	US Rumelange	13	3	3	7	21	36	−15	12	Qualification for the Luxembourg National Division play-offs
14	Etzella Ettelbruck	13	2	2	9	10	26	−16	8	Qualification for the Luxembourg National Division play-offs
15	Wiltz 71	13	1	3	9	20	35	−15	6	Relegation to the Luxembourg Division of Honour
16	Swift Hesperange	13	0	0	13	2	48	−46	−12	Relegation to the Luxembourg Division of Honour

Updated to match(es) played on 22 November 2026. Source: Soccerway
Rules for classification: 1) Points; 2) Goal difference; 3) Matches won; 4) Head-to-head points; 5) Head-to-head goal difference; 6) Head-to-head goals scored; 7) Play-off.

== Results ==
Home \ Away	BIS	DIF	DUD	ETZ	HOS	JEU	KAE	MON	PRO	RAC	RUM	SWI	UNA	VIC	WAL	WIL
Atert Bissen	—		2–0	5–1	5–1			1–2	0–4							4–2
Differdange 03		—	2–1	1–0			4–1		4–4	3–0	2–0	3–0			6–0	
F91 Dudelange			—				2–4			1–3	3–2	5–0	0–2	3–0	2–2	
Etzella Ettelbruck			1–3	—			0–1		2–0	0–1			0–2		0–5	
Hostert		0–2	0–0	5–1	—				0–2		4–4		0–2			
Jeunesse Esch	0–2	0–3		1–0	1–1	—		1–3								5–1
Käerjeng 97	1–2				4–2	4–1	—	2–2				6–0		5–0	1–2	
Mondorf-les-Bains		3–2	1–0		2–1			—	2–1				1–2			4–1
Progrès Niederkorn						2–1	1–2		—	0–0	3–0	3–0	0–1			
Racing Union	2–2					5–1	5–1	6–0		—		5–0		2–2		3–1
US Rumelange	0–6					2–5		1–2		2–1	—	1–0		3–2		
Swift Hesperange	0–4			0–3	0–2	0–3						—		0–3	0–3	2–7
UNA Strassen	2–1					1–0	2–1			1–1	2–0		—	4–0		
Victoria Rosport		3–5		1–1	0–2	3–2		2–3						—	4–1	4–0
Résidence Walferdange	1–2				3–2			2–1	0–1		3–3		0–3		—	1–1
Wiltz 71		1–2	1–2	1–1					1–2		3–3		0–2			—

Updated to match(es) played on 22 November 2026. Source: Soccerway
Legend: Blue = home team win; Yellow = draw; Red = away team win.
For upcoming matches, an "a" indicates there is an article about the rivalry between the two participants.

== Luxembourg National Division play-offs ==
The thirteenth and fourteenth-placed teams will face the fourth and third-placed teams from the 2026–27 Luxembourg Division of Honour for the final two places in the 2027–28 Luxembourg National Division.

== Statistics ==
=== Top scorers ===
As of 31 October 2026

Rank	Player	Club	Goals
1	(France) Hatim Far	Mondorf-les-Bains	12
2	(Madagascar) Roman Ferber	Atert Bissen	11
2	(Luxembourg) Patrick Macedo	Résidence Walferdange	11
4	(Germany) Dominik Stolz	Racing Union	9
5	(Luxembourg) Ken Schmitz	Jeunesse Esch	8
6	(Belgium) Benjamin Romeyns	Wiltz 71	7
6	(Senegal) Abou Dieye	Käerjéng 97	7
8	(France) Ronan Matuvangua	Racing Union	6
8	(Nigeria) Elijah Benedict	Differdange 03	6
8	(France) Diogo Fernandes	US Hostert	6
8	(Morocco) Samir Hadji	Progrès Niederkorn	6
