= 2016–17 Luxembourg National Division =

Luxembourg National Division
- Season: 2016–17
- Champions: F91 Dudelange
- Relegated: Rumelange; UN Käerjéng 97; Jeunesse Canach
- Champions League: F91 Dudelange
- Europa League: Differdange 03; Fola Esch; Progrès Niederkorn
- Matches: 182
- Goals: 605 (3.32 per match)
- Top goalscorer: Omar Er Rafik (26 goals)
- All statistics correct as of 21 May 2017.

The 2016–17 Luxembourg National Division was the 103rd season of football in Luxembourg. The season started on 6 August 2016 and ended on 21 May 2017.

== Teams ==
The following 3 clubs left the National Division before the season -

- FC Wiltz 71 – relegated to Luxembourg Division of Honour
- FC Etzella Ettelbruck – relegated to Luxembourg Division of Honour
- CS Grevenmacher – relegated to Luxembourg Division of Honour

The following 3 clubs joined the National Division before the season -

- UN Käerjeng 97 – promoted from Luxembourg Division of Honour
- Union Titus Pétange – promoted from Luxembourg Division of Honour
- FC Jeunesse Canach – promoted from Luxembourg Division of Honour
Location of the 2016–17 Luxembourg National Division teams

Team	Venue	Capacity
FC Differdange 03	Stade Parc des Sports	2,400
F91 Dudelange	Stade Jos Nosbaum	2,558
Fola Esch	Stade Émile Mayrisch	3,826
FC Jeunesse Canach	Stade Rue de Lenningen	1,000
Jeunesse Esch	Stade de la Frontière	5,400
US Mondorf-les-Bains	Stade John Grün	3,600
FC Progrès Niederkorn	Stade Jos Haupert	2,800
Racing FC Union Luxembourg	Stade Achille Hammerel	5,814
FC RM Hamm Benfica	Terrain de Football Cents	2,800
US Rumelange	Stade Municipal	2,950
UN Käerjeng 97	Terrain Jos Bloes	2,500
FC UNA Strassen	Complexe Sportif Jean Wirtz	2,000
Union Titus Pétange	Stade Municipal de Pétange	2,400
Victoria Rosport	VictoriArena	1,000

Source: Soccerway

== League table ==
Pos	Team	Pld	W	D	L	GF	GA	GD	Pts	Qualification or relegation
1	F91 Dudelange (C)	26	20	5	1	68	14	+54	65	Qualification for the Champions League second qualifying round
2	Differdange 03	26	20	5	1	65	21	+44	65	Qualification for the Europa League first qualifying round (Note: Since the winners of the 2016–17 Luxembourg Cup, F91 Dudelange, qualified for European competition based on league position, the spot awarded to the cup winners (Europa League first qualifying round) was passed to the fourth-placed team.)
3	Fola Esch	26	16	8	2	69	34	+35	56	Qualification for the Europa League first qualifying round
4	Progrès Niederkorn	26	13	5	8	57	38	+19	44	Qualification for the Europa League first qualifying round
5	UNA Strassen	26	11	4	11	39	47	−8	37	
6	Union Titus Pétange	26	10	5	11	38	33	+5	35	
7	Mondorf-les-Bains	26	9	3	14	29	45	−16	30	
8	Jeunesse Esch	26	7	8	11	38	49	−11	29	
9	Victoria Rosport	26	8	4	14	38	54	−16	28	
10	Racing FC	26	8	3	15	38	52	−14	27	
11	RM Hamm Benfica	26	7	5	14	29	47	−18	26	
12	Jeunesse Canach (R)	26	5	8	13	30	54	−24	23	Qualification for the relegation play-offs
13	Rumelange (R)	26	5	8	13	29	53	−24	23	Relegation to the Luxembourg Division of Honour
14	UN Käerjéng 97 (R)	26	7	1	18	37	63	−26	22	Relegation to the Luxembourg Division of Honour

Source: UEFA, Soccerway
Rules for classification: 1) Points; 2) Goal difference; 3) Matches won; 4) Head-to-head points; 5) Head-to-head goal difference; 6) Head-to-head goals scored; 7) Play-off.
(C) Champions; (R) Relegated

== Results ==
Each team plays every other team in the league twice, home-and-away, for a total of 26 matches played each.

Home \ Away	DIF	DUD	FOL	JEC	JES	MON	PRO	RAC	RMH	RUM	KÄE	UNA	PÉT	VIC
Differdange 03	—	0–0	2–0	5–1	3–1	6–0	2–0	3–2	1–0	2–0	6–2	4–1	1–0	6–2
F91 Dudelange	0–1	—	5–2	6–1	5–1	1–0	4–0	4–0	3–0	3–2	1–0	3–0	3–0	3–0
Fola Esch	1–1	2–2	—	2–2	2–2	1–0	1–1	4–1	3–2	7–1	4–2	5–0	3–1	3–1
Jeunesse Canach	0–1	0–2	3–4	—	1–1	1–1	0–5	3–2	4–1	3–1	2–0	1–3	0–4	0–2
Jeunesse Esch	1–0	0–3	0–3	2–2	—	1–3	0–2	1–2	1–1	3–0	3–1	1–1	2–1	2–2
Mondorf-les-Bains	0–3	1–1	1–3	3–0	1–0	—	2–0	2–1	1–2	0–0	2–1	0–3	0–2	2–1
Progrès Niederkorn	1–2	1–2	2–2	2–2	1–1	1–2	—	2–1	4–1	4–0	0–2	5–1	0–2	3–1
Racing FC	0–2	1–2	0–2	1–0	1–2	3–1	4–5	—	2–1	1–1	3–0	1–0	0–4	1–2
RM Hamm Benfica	1–3	0–3	1–1	2–0	1–3	2–0	0–3	2–3	—	0–0	1–2	1–1	0–1	2–1
Rumelange	0–0	0–3	1–3	1–1	3–2	5–2	1–3	1–1	0–0	—	2–1	0–2	0–0	3–1
UN Käerjéng 97	3–5	1–1	0–4	3–1	1–4	1–0	2–4	0–3	6–0	4–3	—	0–2	0–3	2–3
UNA Strassen	4–4	0–3	1–3	0–2	1–1	3–1	1–3	3–0	0–5	2–0	2–0	—	3–1	0–2
Pétange	0–1	1–1	1–1	0–0	6–2	2–1	0–3	1–1	1–2	1–2	3–1	0–3	—	2–0
Victoria Rosport	1–1	0–4	1–3	0–0	2–1	1–3	2–2	4–3	0–1	4–2	1–2	1–2	3–1	—

Source: UEFA, Soccerway
Legend: Blue = home team win; Yellow = draw; Red = away team win.

== Relegation play-offs ==
A play-off (on neutral ground) was played between the twelfth-placed team in the 2016–17 Luxembourg National Division and the third-placed team in the 2016–17 Luxembourg Division of Honour for one place in the 2017–18 Luxembourg National Division.

25 May 2017
18:00 CEST

Jeunesse Canach	2–2 (a.e.t.)	US Hostert
Sy Seck 8', 20'	Report	Stump 12'; Rougeaux 51'
Penalties
	2–4

Stade John Grün, Mondorf-les-Bains
Attendance: 1,579
Referee: Frank Bourgnon

== Top goalscorers ==
Rank	Player	Club	Goals
1	(Morocco) Omar Er Rafik	Differdange 03	26
2	(France) Remi Laurent	Progrès Niederkorn	24
3	(Luxembourg) David Turpel	F91 Dudelange	21
4	(Morocco) Samir Hadji	Fola Esch	20
5	(Armenia) Aleksandre Karapetian	Victoria Rosport	19
6	(Portugal) Bertino Cabral Barbosa	RM Hamm Benfica	16
7	(France) Mickael Jager	UNA Strassen	15
8	(France) Julien Jahier	Racing FC	14

== See also ==
- 2016–17 Luxembourg Cup
