= 2016–17 Luxembourg Cup =

Tournament details
- Country: Luxembourg
- Teams: 104

Final positions
- Champions: F91 Dudelange
- Runners-up: Fola Esch

The 2016–17 Luxembourg Cup was the 92nd version of the association football knockout tournament. This competition began on 3 September 2016 and ended on 28 May 2017.

== Format ==
This season's Luxembourg Cup was a single elimination knockout tournament between 104 clubs. The winner of this cup earned a spot in the Europa League. Any matches which are level after regulation proceeded to extra time and then to penalties to determine a winner.

== Preliminary round ==
Four preliminary round matches were played 24 August 2016.

Team 1	Score	Team 2
24 August
US Folschette (5)	1–6	Luna Oberkorn (4)
Vinesca Ehnen (4)	0–2	AS Luxemburg/Porto (4)
Minière Lasauvage (5)	3–2	SC Ell (4)
US Rambrouch (5)	2–3	CS Oberkorn (4)

== First round ==
Thirty-six first round matches were played 2, 3, 4 and 7 September 2016.

Team 1	Score	Team 2
2 September
Koerich/Simmern (5)	4–0	Olympia Christnach (5)
3 September
Jeunesse Useldange (4)	0–4	URB (3)
4 September
Jeunesse Gilsdorf (4)	0–2	Blue Boys Muhlenbach (3)
Munsbach (3)	7–3	Orania Vianden (3)
Schifflange 95 (3)	3–0	Jeunesse Schieren (3)
Blo-Weiss Medernach (3)	3–1	Sporting Mertzig (3)
Brouch (4)	1–5	Young Boys Diekirch (4)
FC Beckerich (5)	3–1	Racing Troisvierges (4)
Yellow Boys Weiler (3)	1–1 (a.e.t.) (5–3 p)	Sporting Bertrange (3)
Noertzange (5)	2–5	Blo Weiss Itzig (3)
Minerva Lintgen (3)	2–1	Alliance Äischdall (3)
Berdorf Consdorf (4)	2–6	SC Steinfort (4)
Boevange/Attert (4)	0–6	FC Lorentzweiler (3)
Excelsior Grevels (5)	3–6	Luna Oberkorn (4)
Schengen (5)	1–3	Colmar-Berg (4)
Minière Lasauvage (5)	1–3	Rupensia Lusitanos Larochette (4)
Red Black/Egalité 07 (3)	2–0	Marisca Mersch (3)
Kischpelt Wilwerwiltz (5)	0–4	Pratzerthal-Redange (3)
The Belval Belvaux (3)	2–2 (a.e.t.) (4–5 p)	Erpeldange 72 (3)
Clemency (5)	2–6	Jeunesse Biwer (4)
Wincrange (4)	6–3	Berdenia Berbourg (3)
Kopstal 33 (5)	1–6	Hosingen (4)
Reisdorf (5)	2–3	Tricolore Gasperich (5)
Red Star Merl-Belair (4)	2–0	Koeppchen Wormeldange (3)
CeBra 01 (5)	3–1	Ehlerange (4)
Sanem (3)	0–3	Résidence Walferdange (3)
Bourscheid (5)	2–12	Union 05 Kayl-Tétange (3)
CS Oberkorn (4)	1–3	Jeunesse Junglinster (3)
Heiderscheid/Eschdorf (5)	0–1	ES Schouweiler (4)
Bettembourg (4)	3–6	Kehlen (3)
Les Aiglons Dalheim (5)	2–8	Feulen (4)
Moutfort/Medingen (4)	0–3	Alisontia Steinsel (3)
Les Ardoisiers Perlé (5)	2–1 (a.e.t.)	Daring-Club Echternach (4)
AS Luxemburg/Porto (4)	2–3	FC 47 Bastendorf (3)
Green Boys (5)	4–4 (4–5 p)	Syra Mensdorf (4)
7 September
Red Boys Aspelt (4)	6–1	Claravallis Clervaux (4)

== Second round ==
Thirty-two second round matches were played 16–18 September 2016. The draw for the second round was held 8 September 2016.

Team 1	Score	Team 2
16 September
SC Steinfort (4)	1–4	Etzella Ettelbruck (2)
Yellow Boys Weiler (3)	1–4	Victoria Rosport (1)
17 September
URB (3)	0–8	Racing (1)
ES Schouweiler (4)	0–4	Minerva Lintgen (3)
18 September
Résidence Walferdange (3)	1–3	Grevenmacher (2)
Blo Weiss Itzig (3)	0–5	Differdange 03 (1)
Red Black/Egalité 07 (3)	1–5	Sandweiler (2)
Red Boys Aspelt (4)	0–4	Käerjéng 97 (1)
Union 05 Kayl-Tétange (3)	2–3	Pétange (1)
Pratzerthal-Redange (3)	2–3	RM Hamm Benfica (1)
FC Lorentzweiler (3)	3–3 (a.e.t.) (4–3 p)	Atert Bissen (2)
Erpeldange 72 (3)	1–6	Rumelange (1)
Blue Boys Muhlenbach (3)	0–1	Progrès Niederkorn (1)
Syra Mensdorf (4)	0–3	Jeunesse Canach (1)
Young Boys Diekirch (4)	1–3	Rodange 91 (2)
Munsbach (3)	0–6	Hostert (2)
Wincrange (4)	0–6	Swift Hesperange (2)
Alisontia Steinsel (3)	1–0	Mamer 32 (2)
Schifflange 95 (3)	1–7	F91 Dudelange (1)
Red Star Merl-Belair (4)	0–2	Mondercange (2)
Kehlen (3)	3–1 (a.e.t.)	Union Mertert-Wasserbillig (2)
Colmar-Berg (4)	0–5	UNA Strassen (1)
Koerich/Simmern (5)	0–0 (a.e.t.) (5–4 p)	Avenir Beggen (2)
FC Beckerich (5)	1–13	US Esch (2)
FC 47 Bastendorf (3)	1–2 (a.e.t.)	FF Norden 02 (2)
CeBra 01 (5)	1–3	Jeunesse Esch (1)
Hosingen (4)	4–3	Jeunesse Biwer (4)
Tricolore Gasperich (5)	1–4	Blo-Weiss Medernach (3)
Rupensia Lusitanos Larochette (4)	2–4	Feulen (4)
Les Ardoisiers Perlé (5)	0–7	Fola Esch (1)
Jeunesse Junglinster (3)	0–4	Mondorf-les-Bains (1)
Luna Oberkorn (4)	0–3	Wiltz 71 (2)

== Third round ==
Sixteen third round matches were played 28–30 October 2016. The draw for the third round was held 20 September 2016.

Team 1	Score	Team 2
28 October
Alisontia Steinsel (3)	1–2 (a.e.t.)	FC Lorentzweiler (3)
29 October
Blo-Weiss Medernach (3)	0–4	Etzella Ettelbruck (2)
Grevenmacher (2)	3–1 (a.e.t.)	Jeunesse Canach (1)
Koerich/Simmern (5)	0–3	Wiltz 71 (2)
Minerva Lintgen (3)	2–3	Mondercange (2)
30 October
Hosingen (4)	0–4	Rodange 91 (2)
Käerjéng 97 (1)	0–1	RM Hamm Benfica (1)
Kehlen (3)	0–2 (a.e.t.)	Rumelange (1)
US Esch (2)	4–2	UNA Strassen (1)
Feulen (4)	0–2	Swift Hesperange (2)
FF Norden 02 (2)	1–4	Racing (1)
Mondorf-les-Bains (1)	1–3	Victoria Rosport (1)
F91 Dudelange (1)	6–0	Pétange (1)
Hostert (2)	2–1	Progrès Niederkorn (1)
Sandweiler (2)	0–1	Fola Esch (1)
Differdange 03 (1)	2–0	Jeunesse Esch (1)

== Fourth round ==
Eight fourth round matches were played 19–20 November 2016. The draw for the fourth round was held 8 November 2016.

Team 1	Score	Team 2
19 November
Grevenmacher (2)	0–1	Differdange 03 (1)
20 November
Victoria Rosport (1)	5–1	RM Hamm Benfica (1)
Etzella Ettelbruck (2)	2–1 (a.e.t.)	Rumelange (1)
Rodange 91 (2)	3–1 (a.e.t.)	Mondercange (2)
Wiltz 71 (2)	0–5	F91 Dudelange (1)
FC Lorentzweiler (3)	0–4	Racing (1)
Hostert (2)	3–5	Fola Esch (1)
US Esch (2)	2–1 (a.e.t.)	Swift Hesperange (2)

== Quarter–finals ==
Four quarter-final matches were played 15–17 April 2017. The draw for the quarter-finals was held 20 January 2017.

Team 1	Score	Team 2
Etzella Ettelbruck (2)	0–1	Racing (1)
Fola Esch (1)	2–0	Victoria Rosport (1)
Rodange 91 (2)	2–3 (a.e.t.)	US Esch (2)
Differdange 03 (1)	0–3	F91 Dudelange (1)

== Semi–finals ==
Two semi-final matches were played 26–27 April 2017. The draw for the semi-finals was held 18 April 2017.

Team 1	Score	Team 2
Fola Esch (1)	4–0	Racing (1)
US Esch (2)	0–3	F91 Dudelange (1)

== Final ==
The final was played on 28 May 2017.

28 May 2017
17:00 CEST

F91 Dudelange	4–1	Fola Esch
Edisson Jordanov 41'; Dominik Stolz 71'; David Turpel 80'; Sanel Ibrahimović 87'	Report (in French)	Gerson Rodrigues 52'

Stade Josy Barthel
Attendance: 1,989
Referee: Marco Tropeano

== See also ==
- 2016–17 Luxembourg National Division
