= 2023–24 Luxembourg National Division =

Luxembourg National Division
- Season: 2023–24
- Dates: 5 August 2023 – 26 May 2024
- Champions: Differdange 03; 1st title
- Relegated: Marisca Mersch; Schifflange 95; U.N. Käerjeng '97
- Champions League: Differdange 03
- Conference League: F91 Dudelange; Progrès Niederkorn; UNA Strassen
- Matches: 240
- Goals: 750 (3.13 per match)
- Top goalscorer: Jorginho (25 Goals)
- Biggest home win: Differdange 03 7-0 Racing FC (11 February 2024)
- Biggest away win: UNA Strassen 1–5 Swift Hesperange (6 August 2023)
- Highest scoring: Mondorf-les-Bains 5–3 UN Käerjéng 97 (20 August 2023)
- Longest winning run: 4 matches Differdange 03
- Longest unbeaten run: 21 matches Differdange 03
- Longest winless run: 9 matches Schifflange 95
- Longest losing run: 6 matches Schifflange 95
- All statistics correct as of 18 March 2024.

The 2023–24 Luxembourg National Division season, also known as BGL Ligue, for sponsorship reasons, was the 110th of top-tier association football in Luxembourg. The season began on 5 August 2023 and ended on 26 May 2024.

The winners (Differdange 03, their seventh title win) qualified for the first qualifying round of the 2024–25 UEFA Champions League. The 2023–24 Luxembourg Cup winners (Progrès Niederkorn) qualified for the second qualifying round of the 2024–25 UEFA Conference League, with the third and sixth-placed teams (F91 Dudelange and UNA Strassen) qualifying for the first qualifying round. The thirteenth and fourteenth-placed teams (U.N. Käerjeng '97 and Fola Esch) qualified for the Luxembourg National Division play-offs, with Fola Esch winning and retaining their place in the league, and U.N. Käerjeng '97 losing and being relegated to the 2024–25 Luxembourg Division of Honour alongside the bottom two teams (Marisca Mersch and Schifflange 95).

Progrès Niederkorn drew the highest attendance in the league with 2,300.

== Teams ==
Etzella Ettelbruck and Hostert were relegated at the end of the previous season, while Schifflange 95 and Marisca Mersch were promoted from the Luxembourg Division of Honour. Swift Hesperange entered the season as defending league champions.

=== Stadia and locations ===
Locations of the 2023–24 Luxembourg National Division teams

Team	Town
Differdange 03	Differdange
F91 Dudelange	Dudelange
Fola Esch	Esch-sur-Alzette
Jeunesse Esch	Esch-sur-Alzette
Marisca Mersch	Mersch
Mondercange	Mondercange
Mondorf-les-Bains	Mondorf-les-Bains
Progrès Niederkorn	Niederkorn
Racing FC	Luxembourg
Schifflange 95	Schifflange
Swift Hesperange	Hesperange
U.N. Käerjeng '97	Bascharage
UNA Strassen	Strassen
UT Pétange	Pétange
Victoria Rosport	Rosport
Wiltz	Wiltz

== League table ==
Pos	Team	Pld	W	D	L	GF	GA	GD	Pts	Qualification or relegation
1	Differdange 03 (C)	30	19	9	2	70	23	+47	66	Qualification for the Champions League first qualifying round
2	Swift Hesperange	30	18	7	5	66	35	+31	61	
3	F91 Dudelange	30	19	4	7	59	36	+23	61	Qualification for the Conference League first qualifying round (Note: Swift Hesparange and Jeunesse Esch were refused a UEFA license; the second Conference League first round spot was passed to the sixth-placed team.)
4	Progrès Niederkorn	30	16	7	7	54	35	+19	55	Qualification for the Conference League second qualifying round (Note: Progrès Niederkorn qualified for the Conference League second qualifying round by winning the 2023–24 Luxembourg Cup.)
5	Jeunesse Esch	30	13	6	11	51	41	+10	45	
6	UNA Strassen	30	11	11	8	40	38	+2	44	Qualification for the Conference League first qualifying round
7	Victoria Rosport	30	12	8	10	45	44	+1	44	
8	Union Titus Pétange	30	11	6	13	48	47	+1	39	
9	Mondorf-les-Bains	30	10	8	12	55	53	+2	38	
10	Racing Union	30	11	5	14	46	58	−12	38	
11	Wiltz 71	30	7	12	11	43	52	−9	33	
12	Mondercange	30	8	8	14	33	57	−24	32	
13	U.N. Käerjeng '97 (R)	30	7	7	16	31	49	−18	28	Qualification for the Luxembourg National Division play-offs
14	Fola Esch (O)	30	8	4	18	33	61	−28	28	Qualification for the Luxembourg National Division play-offs
15	Marisca Mersch (R)	30	7	5	18	40	62	−22	26	Relegation to the Luxembourg Division of Honour
16	Schifflange 95 (R)	30	6	7	17	36	59	−23	25	Relegation to the Luxembourg Division of Honour

Source: UEFA, Flashscore
Rules for classification: 1) Points; 2) Goal difference; 3) Matches won; 4) Head-to-head points; 5) Head-to-head goal difference; 6) Head-to-head goals scored; 7) Play-off.
(C) Champions; (O) Play-off winners; (R) Relegated

== Results ==
Home \ Away	DIF	DUD	FOL	JEU	MAR	MND	MON	PRO	RAC	SCH	SWI	UNK	UNA	UTP	VIC	WIL
Differdange 03	—	2–0	5–1	3–1	2–0	2–0	1–1	3–1	7–0	5–0	2–0	4–0	2–0	2–0	2–2	1–1
F91 Dudelange	2–2	—	4–0	1–1	1–0	4–2	2–1	0–2	2–0	1–0	1–0	4–1	4–3	3–0	3–0	3–1
Fola Esch	2–0	3–2	—	0–1	1–2	2–2	3–2	0–0	1–2	2–1	1–2	1–0	1–1	0–3	0–1	0–1
Jeunesse Esch	4–3	1–2	4–1	—	3–1	0–1	2–2	1–3	3–0	3–3	0–2	3–0	1–2	0–0	0–2	5–2
Marisca Mersch	1–1	3–4	0–1	4–1	—	2–1	1–4	0–3	2–2	2–0	2–2	2–1	2–3	1–4	1–2	1–1
Mondercange	1–1	1–0	2–1	0–2	1–2	—	3–2	2–1	0–4	2–1	0–6	2–1	0–0	0–3	3–3	1–3
Mondorf-les-Bains	0–2	4–0	6–0	0–2	3–2	2–0	—	2–4	1–3	3–3	0–2	5–3	1–1	2–1	2–0	2–0
Progrès Niederkorn	0–1	1–0	3–2	1–3	4–3	1–1	3–0	—	2–1	4–0	2–0	2–0	2–0	2–1	1–1	3–0
Racing Union	1–3	0–3	0–1	0–3	4–1	1–1	1–1	3–3	—	1–0	2–5	2–1	2–1	2–0	0–3	2–4
Schifflange 95	0–4	0–3	3–1	1–3	2–1	2–2	0–0	2–0	4–1	—	1–4	0–1	0–2	3–3	2–2	1–1
Swift Hesperange	1–1	2–1	4–1	2–0	3–1	1–1	1–2	0–0	2–1	2–1	—	0–0	2–0	3–3	3–2	1–1
U.N. Käerjeng '97	0–1	2–2	2–1	1–1	1–0	1–2	2–1	2–0	1–4	1–0	1–3	—	0–1	0–1	0–0	2–2
UNA Strassen	2–2	1–1	3–1	1–1	1–1	1–0	4–2	0–1	1–1	1–0	1–5	2–1	—	1–0	0–0	1–1
Union Titus Pétange	1–4	0–1	2–1	2–1	4–1	4–0	4–1	2–2	0–3	1–3	2–0	1–1	2–2	—	2–3	1–0
Victoria Rosport	0–1	1–2	2–3	1–0	2–0	2–1	1–1	3–1	1–0	1–2	1–3	1–4	0–3	3–1	—	3–1
Wiltz 71	1–1	2–3	1–1	0–1	0–1	2–1	2–2	2–2	1–3	2–1	4–5	1–1	2–1	2–0	2–2	—

Source: Flashscore
Legend: Blue = home team win; Yellow = draw; Red = away team win.

== Luxembourg National Division play-offs ==
The thirteenth and fourteenth-placed teams (U.N. Käerjeng '97 and Fola Esch) faced the fourth and third-placed teams from the 2023–24 Luxembourg Division of Honour (Hostert and Rumelange), respectively, for the final two places in the 2024–25 Luxembourg National Division.

31 May 2024

U.N. Käerjeng '97	1–3 (a.e.t.)	Hostert
Thiel 48'		Amehi 59'; M'Barki 99'; Muric 111'

2 June 2024

Fola Esch	2–2 (a.e.t.)	Rumelange
Flick 15'; Klein 90+3'		Moukam 51'; Maison 79'
Penalties
Martins (penalty scored); Diallo (penalty scored); Flick (penalty scored); Tawaba (penalty scored)	4–1	Donval (penalty missed); Dragovic (penalty missed); Moukam (penalty scored)

== Statistics ==
=== Top scorers ===
As of 26 August 2024

Rank	Player	Club	Goals
1	(Portugal) Jorge Gabriel Costa Monteiro	Differdange 03	25
2	(Luxembourg) Benjamin Bresch	Marisca Mersch	22
3	(France) Samir Hadji	F91 Dudelange	20
4	(Germany) Dominik Stolz	Swift Hesperange	17
5	(Germany) Andreas Buch	Racing FC	12
5	(France) Oumar Gassama	Mondorf-les-Bains	12
5	(France) Walid Jarmouni	Progrès Niederkorn	12

== See also ==
- Luxembourg Cup
- Luxembourg Division of Honour
