= FC Résidence Walferdange =

Association football club in Luxembourg

Résidence Walferdange
- Full name: FC Résidence Walferdange
- Founded: 1908; 118 years ago
- Ground: Stade Prince Henri
- Capacity: 1,500
- President: David Wagener
- Manager: Patrick Oliveira
- League: National Division
- 2025–26: Division of Honour, 4th of 16 (promoted)
- Website: https://www.fcresidence.lu/

FC Résidence Walferdange is a Luxembourg football club from Walferdange, founded in 1908, who compete in the National Division, the top tier of Luxembourgish football.

== History ==
In the 2022–23 season, Résidence Walferdange won the Coupe FLF, however this victory was forfeited after they played a suspended player during the match.

Résidence Walferdange won promotion to the National Division for the first time in the 2026–27 season after beating Jeunesse Canach on penalties in the promotion playoffs.

== Players ==
As of 30 September 2026

Note: Flags indicate national team as defined under FIFA eligibility rules; some limited exceptions apply. Players may hold more than one non-FIFA nationality.

No.	Pos.	Nation	Player
2	DF	LUX	Jordan Barbalinardo Sampaio
5	DF	FRA	Paul Mortas
7	FW	LUX	Patrick Macedo
8	MF	LUX	Marco Da Silva Gonçalves
9	FW	CAF	Marco Majouga
11	FW	LUX	Alex Lopes Marta
14	GK	LUX	José Eduardo Fraga Cunha
16	DF	LUX	Ricky De Sousa
17	MF	USA	Lewis Long
18	MF	LUX	Thierry Delgado
20	DF	LUX	Adrano Junior De Sousa Ferraz
20	FW	HUN	Sebestyén Szári
21	MF	FRA	Néphi Kamwanay
21	MF	LUX	André Matias Da Silva
22	DF	LUX	David Mendes Merces

No.	Pos.	Nation	Player
23	DF	LUX	Thiago Costa
24	DF	FRA	Sami Fettahi
27	DF	POR	Hugo Loureiro
30	DF	BEL	Yoni Iserentant
38	MF	LUX	Thiago Semedo Monteiro
44	DF	BEL	Benjamin Bogmis
45	DF	POR	José Francisco Monteiro Peti
68	MF	LUX	Jason José Federspiel Barreto
70	MF	POR	Francisco Da ilva Fernandes
77	MF	LUX	Olav Moreira
79	MF	POR	Daniel Freitas
80	FW	MAR	Cehaib El Moutawakil
94	GK	CIV	Ricky De Paiva
96	FW	LUX	Valter Andrade
