= Farid Ikene =

Luxembourgish footballer (born 2000)

Personal information
- Date of birth: 15 December 2000 (age 25)
- Height: 1.73 m (5 ft 8 in)
- Position: Midfielder

Team information
- Current team: Racing FC Union Luxembourg
- Number: 10

Youth career
- –2017: F91 Dudelange
- 2017–2018: FC Differdange 03

Senior career*
Years	Team	Apps	(Gls)
2017–2018	FC Differdange 03	0	(0)
2018–2019	FC Progrès Niederkorn	7	(0)
2019–2021	Racing FC Union Luxembourg	50	(5)
2022	Jammerbugt FC	13	(0)
2022–	Racing FC Union Luxembourg	101	(20)

International career^{‡}
2021–2022	Luxembourg U21	8	(0)
- * Club domestic league appearances and goals as of 31 October 2026 ‡ National team caps and goals as of 6 June 2022

Farid Ikene (born 15 December 2000) is a Luxembourgish professional footballer who plays as a midfielder for Racing FC Union Luxembourg.

== Early life ==
Ikene was born on 15 December 2000. Of Algerian descent through his parents, he is the older brother of Luxembourg international Sofiane Ikene.

== Club career ==
As a youth player, Ikene joined the youth academy of F91 Dudelange. Following his stint there, he joined the youth academy of FC Differdange 03 in 2017 and was promoted to the club's senior team the same year, where he made zero league appearances and scored zero goals. One year later, he signed for FC Progrès Niederkorn.

Subsequently, he signed for Danish side Jammerbugt FC in 2022, where he was regarded to have established himself as a regular starter while playing for the club. Ahead of the 2022–23 season, he returned to Racing FC Union Luxembourg, where he captained the club.

== International career ==
Ikene is a Luxembourg youth international. During June, September, and October 2021 and March and June 2022, he played for the Luxembourg national under-21 football team for 2023 UEFA European Under-21 Championship qualification.
