= Luxembourg Division of Honour =

Association football league in Luxembourg

- Country: Luxembourg
- Confederation: UEFA
- Number of clubs: 16
- Level on pyramid: 2
- Promotion to: Luxembourg National Division
- Relegation to: 1. Division
- Domestic cup: Luxembourg Cup
- Current champions: US Rumelange (2025–26)
- Current: 2026–27 Luxembourg Division of Honour

The Division of Honour (Luxembourgish: Éierepromotioun, French: Promotion d'Honneur, German: Ehrenpromotion) is the second-level football league in Luxembourg. It lies below the National Division and above the 1. Division.

Each season, the two top-finishing teams in the Division of Honour are automatically promoted to the National Division. The teams that finish the season in third and fourth place enter a play-off match against the teams finishing in thirteenth and fourteenth in that season's National Division. The two lowest-finishing teams are relegated to the 1. Division, with the teams in thirteenth and fourteenth also facing a play-off match against the teams finishing in second in the two Series in 1. Division.

== Current clubs ==
The clubs competing in the 2026–27 season are listed below.

Team	Location	Stadium	Capacity	2025–26 position
FC Avenir Beggen	Beggen	Stade rue Henri Dunant	4,830	1st (1. Division Series 1) ▲
The Belval Belvaux	Belvaux	Stade FC The Belval	2,000	10th
Berdenia Berbourg	Berbourg	Stade Renert	800	11th
Bettembourg	Bettembourg	Stade Municipal Bettembourg	700	5th
Fola Esch	Esch-sur-Alzette	Stade Émile Mayrisch	7,826	8th
FC Jeunesse Canach	Canach	Stade Rue de Lenningen	1,000	13th (National Division) ▼
Koeppchen Wormeldange	Wormeldange	Stade Am Ga	1,000	14th
Lorentzweiler	Lorentzweiler	Terrain rue de Hunsdorf	1,000	13th
Luxembourg City	Luxembourg City	Luxembourg-Cents	2,800	6th
FC Mamer 32	Mamer	Stade François Trausch	2,600	14th (National Division) ▼
Marisca Mersch	Mersch	Terrain Schintgespesch	1,000	12th
Mondercange	Mondercange	Stade Communal	3,300	9th
Rodange 91	Rodange	Stade Joseph Philippart	3,400	16th (National Division) ▼
Union Titus Pétange	Pétange	Stade Municipal (Pétange)	2,400	15th (National Division) ▼
URB	Remich	Stade Op der Millen	1,000	1st (1. Division Series 2) ▲
US Feulen	Niederfeulen	Terrain In Bertzent	1,500	7th

== Previous winners ==
Year	Winners	Runners-up	Promoted after play-off
1909–1959	Unknown data		
1959–60	Chiers Rodange	US Rumelange	
1960–61	Alliance Dudelange	US Dudelange	
1961–62	Avenir Beggen	The Belval Belvaux	
1962–63	Jeunesse Wasserbillig	Progrès Niedercorn	
1963–64	US Rumelange	FC Rapid Neudorf	
1964–65	CS Pétange	Avenir Beggen	
1965–66	US Mondorf	Rapid Neudorf	
1966–67	Progrès Niedercorn	Red Boys Differdange	
1967–68	CS Fola Esch	CS Grevenmacher	
1968–69	Stade Dudelange	SC Tétange	
1969–70	CS Grevenmacher	Alliance Dudelange	
1970–71	National Schifflange	Etzella Ettelbruck	
1971–72	SC Bettembourg	Fola Esch	
1972–73	Red Star Merl-Belair	Stade Dudelange	
1973–74	Progrès Niedercorn	Alliance Dudelange	
1974–75	Chiers Rodange	Stade Dudelange	
1975–76	CS Grevenmacher	Red-Black Pfaffenthal	
1976–77	Spora Luxembourg	Union Luxembourg	
1977–78	Aris Bonnevoie	Young Boys Diekirch	
1978–79	Spora Luxembourg	Stade Dudelange	
1979–80	Olympique Eischen	Alliance Dudelange	
1980–81	FC Wiltz 71	Jeunesse Hautcharage	
1981–82	US Rumelange	Stade Dudelange	
1982–83	Spora Luxembourg	Etzella Ettelbruck	
1983–84	Alliance Dudelange	Olympique Eischen	
1984–85	CS Grevenmacher	Swift Hesperange	
1985–86	FC Wiltz 71	CS Pétange	
1986–87	Aris Bonnevoie	US Rumelange	
1987–88	CS Pétange		
1988–94	§ Promotion groups (1989–1994)		
1994–95	FC Rodange 91	Sporting Mertzig	
1995–96	CS Hobscheid	US Rumelange	
1996–97	Red Boys Differdange	CS Pétange	
1997–98	Aris Bonnevoie	FC Mondercange	
1998–99	US Rumelange	FC Schifflange 95	
1999–2000	Etzella Ettelbruck	FC Rodange 91	
2000–01	Swift Hesperange	Progrès Niedercorn	
2001–02	FC Wiltz 71	Victoria Rosport	
2002–03	Etzella Ettelbruck	Spora Luxembourg	
2003–04	Alliance 01 Luxemburg	CS Pétange	
2004–05	UN Käerjéng 97	US Rumelange	
2005–06	FC Differdange 03	Progrès Niedercorn	FC Mondercange; FC Mamer 32
2006–07	RM Hamm Benfica	Avenir Beggen	
2007–08	US Rumelange	Fola Esch	SC Steinfort
2008–09	CS Pétange	FC Mondercange	
2009–10	FC Wiltz 71	Jeunesse Canach	
2010–11	Union 05 Kayl-Tétange	US Rumelange	US Hostert
2011–12	Jeunesse Canach	Etzella Ettelbruck	FC Wiltz 71
2012–13	Swift Hesperange	US Rumelange	
2013–14	Victoria Rosport	US Hostert	US Mondorf
2014–15	RM Hamm Benfica	Racing FC Union Luxembourg	UNA Strassen
2015–16	UN Käerjéng 97	CS Pétange	Jeunesse Canach
2016–17	US Esch	FC Rodange 91	US Hostert
2017–18	Etzella Ettelbruck	US Rumelange	
2018–19	FC Rodange 91	Blue Boys Muhlenbach	
2019–20	Not awarded, abandoned due to COVID-19 pandemic		
2020–21	Not awarded, abandoned due to COVID-19 pandemic		
2021–22	FC Monnerich	UN Käerjéng 97	
2022–23	FC Schifflange 95	FC Marisca Mersch	
2023–24	Bettembourg	FC Rodange 91	Hostert
2024–25	Mamer 32	UN Käerjéng 97	Bissen; Jeunesse Canach
2025–26	US Rumelange	Etzella Ettelbruck	Wiltz 71; Walferdange

=== Promotion groups (1989–1994) ===
Between 1988 and 1994, the top 4 teams of each Series of the Division of Honour played in a 'Promotion group' tournament with the four lowest teams of the National Division. The top 2 teams in each group would earn promotion to, or stay in, the top flight. The remaining teams would stay in, or be relegated to, the following season's Division of Honour.

Season	Winners	Runners-up	Also promoted
1988–89	Aris Bonnevoie	Fola Esch	Alliance Dudelange
1989–90	Progrès Niedercorn		
1990–91	FC Wiltz 71	Koeppchen Wormeldange	
1991–92	F91 Dudelange	Etzella Ettelbruck	Fola Esch
1992–93	CS Pétange		
1993–94	FC Wiltz 71	Koeppchen Wormeldange	Swift Hesperange
