= Julien Jahier =

French footballer (born 1980)

Personal information
- Date of birth: 28 November 1980 (age 45)
- Place of birth: Saint-Dizier, France
- Height: 1.88 m (6 ft 2 in)
- Position: Forward

Senior career*
Years	Team	Apps	(Gls)
–2003	FC Toul		
2003–2012	SAS Épinal	230	(99)
2012–2013	Rouen	32	(9)
2013–2015	F91 Dudelange	29	(24)
2015–2018	Racing FC Union Luxembourg	64	(50)
2018–2019	Metz B	77	
- * Club domestic league appearances and goals

Julien Jahier (born 28 November 1980) is a French former professional footballer who played as a forward.

== Career ==
Jahier played in France and Luxembourg.
