= FC Blue Boys Muhlenbach =

Defunct association football club in Luxembourg

Coordinates: 49.631718°N 6.114806°E

Blue Boys Muhlenbach
- Full name: Football Club Blue Boys Muhlenbach
- Founded: 1932
- Dissolved: 18 May 2020
- Ground: Stade Mathias Mamer, Luxembourg
- Capacity: 1,100
- League: Luxembourg National Division
- 2018–19: Division of Honour, 2nd (promoted)
Home colours

FC Blue Boys Muhlenbach, commonly known as Blue Boys Muhlenbach, was an association football club based in the Muhlenbach district of Luxembourg, the capital city of Luxembourg.

== History ==
The club was founded in 1932 as FC Blue Boys Muhlenbach, but changed its name to Sport Verein Muhlenbach. The original name was restored in 1944 and remained until 2009, when the name of Muhlenbach Lusitanos was adopted. In 2012 the club was renamed again as FC Blue Boys Muhlenbach.

Blue Boys were promoted to the top flight of Luxembourg football in 2019.

On 18 May 2020 the club merged with FC RM Hamm Benfica.

== Current squad ==
As of 10 March 2020

Note: Flags indicate national team as defined under FIFA eligibility rules; some limited exceptions apply. Players may hold more than one non-FIFA nationality.

No.	Pos.	Nation	Player
1	GK	POR	Vítor Almeida
3	DF	FRA	Rachid Erragui
6	MF	CHA	Azrack Mahamat
7	FW	SEN	Elhadji Fine Bop
8	FW	FRA	Ahmed Rani
10	FW	LUX	Munir Dragulovcanin
11	MF	LUX	Amel Cosic
16	GK	SEN	Boris Bassene
17	DF	LUX	Jasmin Hodzic
19	FW	MLI	Mamadou Samassa
20	FW	BIH	Šemsudin Džanić
21	MF	LUX	Mirzet Dragolovcanin
22	MF	LUX	Fahir Sabotic
23	FW	LUX	Ricardo Dionisio

No.	Pos.	Nation	Player
24	DF	FRA	Tripy Makonda
25	MF	FRA	Arnaud Guedj
43	DF	ALG	Mustapha Cheriak
87	DF	FRA	Malik N'Diaye
97	FW	LUX	William Rocha
99	GK	BIH	Enes Bijelic (on loan from Union Remich)
—	DF	FRA	Mohamed Koukouch
—	DF	FRA	Brahim Abdelli
—	MF	LUX	Amel Hodzic
—	MF	FRA	Sofiane Rouane
—	DF	LUX	Etelle Mersch
—	MF	LUX	Fahret Selimovic
