= Berbourg =

Town in the commune of Manternach in Luxembourg

Coordinates: 49°44′N 6°24′E

Berbourg (Luxembourgish: Berbuerg, German: Berburg) is a small town in the commune of Manternach, in eastern Luxembourg. As of September 2026, the town has a population of 1,084.
