= FC Atert Bissen =

Association football club in Luxembourg

Atert Bissen
- Full name: Football Club Atert Bissen
- Nicknames: Yellow and Blacks
- Founded: 24 June 1945; 81 years ago
- Ground: Terrain ZAC Klengbousbierg, Bissen
- Capacity: 1,500
- President: Carlos Teixeira
- Manager: Blessing Lumueno
- League: National Division
- 2025–26: National Division, 1st of 16 (champions)
- Website: https://www.fcbissen.lu/
Home colours	Away colours

F.C. Atert Bissen is a football club based in Bissen, Luxembourg, that play in the National Division, the top tier of Luxembourgish football.

== History ==
The club was founded in 1917 under the name FC Jeunesse Bissen and initially dissolved in 1923. In 1929, it was re-founded as Red Star Bissen, which in turn was dissolved in 1934. In 1942, FC 42 Bissen was founded and received its current club name on 2 June 1946.

After finishing third in the 2024–25 Luxembourg Division of Honour Bissen were promoted to the National Division for the first time in their history after beating SC Bettembourg in the promotion play-offs, earning back-to-back promotions since an impressive campaign in the 1. Division.

In the 2025–26 season they shocked Luxembourgish football by winning the title on their debut in the National Division.

== Honours ==
Historical chart of the club's league performance

- Luxembourg National Division

Winners (1): 2025–26

== European competition ==
Competition	P	W	D	L	F	A
Champions League	2	0	0	2	2	4
Conference League	2	0	1	1	3	7
Total	4	0	1	3	5	11

Season	Competition	Round	Opponent	1st Leg	2nd Leg	Agg
2026–27	Champions League	Q1	(Faroe Islands) KÍ	1–2 (A)	1–2 (H)	2–4
2026–27	Conference League	Q2	(Hungary) ETO Győr	2–6 (H)	1–1 (A)	3–7

== Current squad ==
As of 5 October 2026

Note: Flags indicate national team as defined under FIFA eligibility rules; some limited exceptions apply. Players may hold more than one non-FIFA nationality.

No.	Pos.	Nation	Player
1	GK	POR	David Ivanov
2	DF	FRA	Raphaël Diarra
3	DF	LUX	Louis Marasi
4	DF	FRA	Yohan Mannone
5	DF	MAR	Zakaria Louriz
6	MF	POR	Telmo Castanheira
7	MF	POR	Rafaël Fernandes
9	MF	LUX	Lucas Correia
10	MF	POR	Adriel Santos
11	FW	LUX	Joel da Cruz
18	MF	LUX	Eric Veiga
19	MF	POR	Brandon Soares Rosa
20	MF	FRA	Enzo Thalamot
21	MF	MAR	Khalid Abi

No.	Pos.	Nation	Player
22	FW	POR	Oscar Mendes
27	DF	ANG	Kénio Cabral
30	FW	MAD	Roman Ferber
31	MF	LUX	Diogo Pimentel
35	FW	POR	Mamadi Djalo
39	DF	ALG	Toufik Zeghdane
40	GK	MAD	Geordan Dupire
41	MF	LUX	Lenny Correia
45	MF	POR	Miguel Fernandes
58	MF	POR	Seco Sani
70	FW	LUX	Tiago Costa
73	FW	POR	Miguel Roque Vaz
88	GK	CPV	Hélio Lopes
