= Mondercange =

Mondercange Monnerech (Luxembourgish) Monnerich (German)
- Commune
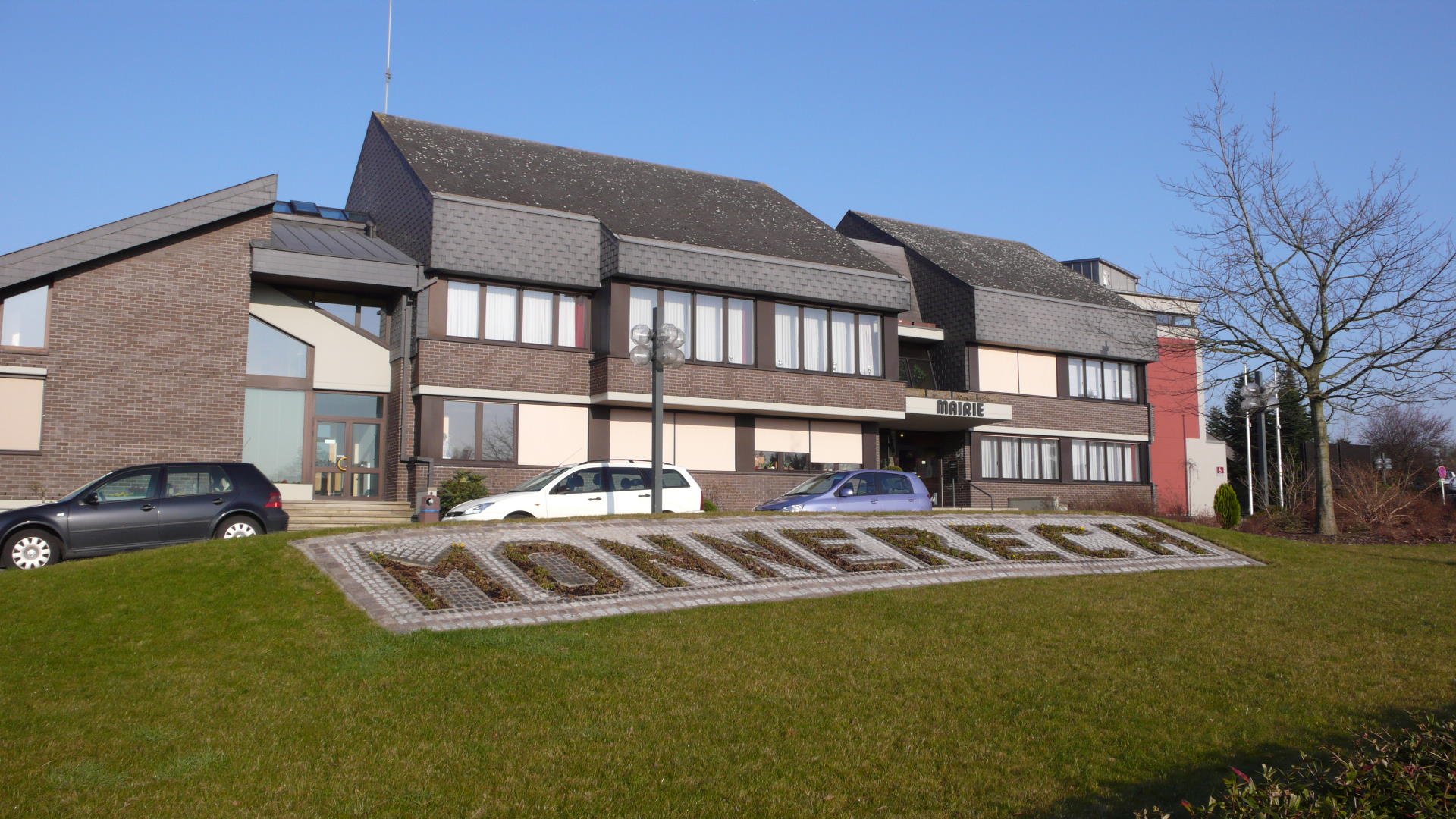
- Town hall

- Coat of arms

- Map of Luxembourg with Mondercange highlighted in orange, and the canton in dark red
- Coordinates: 49.5319°N 5.9889°E
- Country: Luxembourg
- Canton: Esch-sur-Alzette

Government
  - Mayor: Jeannot Fürpass

Area
  - Total: 21.4 km^{2} (8.3 sq mi)
  - Rank: 50th of 100
- Highest elevation: 337 m (1,106 ft)
  - Rank: 89th of 100
- Lowest elevation: 273 m (896 ft)
  - Rank: 74th of 100

Population (2026)
  - Total: 7,331
  - Rank: 20th of 100
  - Density: 343/km^{2} (887/sq mi)
  - Rank: 24th of 100
- Time zone: UTC+1 (CET)
  - Summer (DST): UTC+2 (CEST)
- LAU 2: LU0000208
- Website: mondercange.lu

Mondercange (French pronunciation: [mɔ̃dɛʁkɑ̃ʒ]; Luxembourgish: Monnerech [ˈmonəʀəɕ]; German: Monnerich [ˈmɔnəʁɪç]) is a commune in the canton of Esch-sur-Alzette in south-western Luxembourg. As of 2023, the commune has a population of 7,119 inhabitants.

As of September 2026, the town of Mondercange, which lies in the west of the commune, has a population of 3,963. Other towns within the commune include Bergem, Foetz and Pontpierre.

== Population ==
Historical population

Year	Pop.	±%
1821	988	—
1851	1,261	+27.6%
1900	1,022	−19.0%
1910	1,034	+1.2%
1922	1,140	+10.3%
1935	1,311	+15.0%

Year	Pop.	±%
1947	1,253	−4.4%
1960	2,200	+75.6%
1970	3,262	+48.3%
1981	3,964	+21.5%
1990	4,743	+19.7%
2000	6,128	+29.2%

Year	Pop.	±%
2005	6,117	−0.2%
2010	6,209	+1.5%
2015	6,420	+3.4%
2020	7,007	+9.1%
2021	6,982	−0.4%

Source data

== Sports ==
Mondercange is home to the Luxembourg Football Federation, the governing body for football in Luxembourg. The local football team FC Mondercange, who compete in Luxembourg's second-tier Division of Honour, play their home matches at the commune's Stade Communal.

The karting track in Mondercange was used by Michael Schumacher and Jarno Trulli, amongst others, at the beginning of their racing careers owing to Luxembourg's low age restrictions for karting licences.

== Notable people ==
- Hubert Loutsch (1878–1946), a Luxembourgish politician; the tenth Prime Minister of Luxembourg in 1915/1916.
