= Marisca Mersch =

Association football club in Luxembourg

FC Marisca Mersch
- Full name: FC Marisca Mersch
- Founded: 1908; 118 years ago
- Stadium: Terrain Schintgespesch
- Capacity: 1,000
- Chairman: Frédéric Wiseler
- Manager: Mikhail Zaritskiy
- League: Division of Honour
- 2025–26: Division of Honour, 12th of 16
- Website: fcmarisca.lu

FC Marisca Mersch is an association football club based in Mersch, in central Luxembourg. They currently compete in the Division of Honour, the second tier of Luxembourgish football.

== History ==
The club was founded in 1908 under its current name. In 1940 as part of Germanisation of Luxembourg, FC Marisca Mersch was renamed Fussballklub (FK) Mersch. Following the liberation of Luxembourg, the original name FC Marisca Mersch was restored.

In 1947, as runners up in Division 2 Serie 1, Marisca Mersch were promoted for the first time to the third level of the Luxembourg league pyramid for the first time, where they remained for 10 seasons. In 1963 they reached the Luxembourg Division of Honour, the second division in Luxembourg's football pyramid for the first time.

Historical chart of the club's league performance

In 2012 Marisca Mersch reached the final of the Coupe FLF, a cup competition for teams in the third to fifth divisions of the Luxembourg football league system. They lost in the final 6–0 to Jeunesse Junglinster.

In 2023 Marisca Mersch were promoted to the Luxembourg National Division for the first time, after finishing runners up in the 2022/23 Luxembourg Division of Honour season. 2023 also saw the club reach the final of the Luxembourg Cup for the first time, where they were beaten 4–2 by Differdange 03.

The club has played at Terrain Schintgespesch since 1989.

== Current squad ==
As of 8 April, 2026

Note: Flags indicate national team as defined under FIFA eligibility rules; some limited exceptions apply. Players may hold more than one non-FIFA nationality.

No.	Pos.	Nation	Player
1	GK	LUX	Ben Kohnen
3	DF	FRA	Jérémy Mayele
5	DF	LUX	Dennis Besch
6	DF	SLO	Emir Burkic
7	MF	LUX	Jedilson Varela
8	MF	LUX	Michel Jacobs
9	FW	LUX	Leonel Gomes
10	MF	LUX	Chris Schmit
11	FW	LUX	Ken Schmitz
13	DF	LUX	Patrick Esteves
15	DF	LUX	Kevin Pires
17	MF	POR	Cleidir Neves
18	FW	LUX	Ronaldo Machado
19	MF	LUX	Resul Musolli
20	MF	LUX	Elvir Sabotic

No.	Pos.	Nation	Player
21	GK	FRA	Thierry Groff
24	DF	LUX	Dylan Meireles
25	MF	LUX	Rayan Natami
27	FW	LUX	Jo Masselter
31	GK	GER	Jannis Kniepen
43	MF	LUX	Tun Held
47	GK	SWE	Eddi Atic
60	FW	LUX	Paulo Mendes
66	DF	LUX	Ervin Latik
77	MF	POR	Gerson Pinho
88	GK	LUX	Youn Czekanowicz
90	FW	SEN	Serigne Ndiaye
97	DF	LUX	Giuseppe Ferretti
99	GK	LUX	Yann Duarte
