= US Sandweiler =

Association football club in Luxembourg

- Full name: Union Sportive Sandweiler
- Founded: 1 January 1937; 89 years ago
- Ground: Stade Norbert Hübsch, Sandweiler
- President: Sylvie Simoes
- Manager: Daniel Del Col
- League: 1. Division Series 2
- 2025–26: 1. Division Series 2, 7th of 16
- Website: www.ussandweiler.com
Home colours	Away colours

Union Sportive Sandweiler is an association football club based in Sandweiler, in southern Luxembourg. Founded in 1937, the club's senior team currently plays in the Luxembourg Division of Honour, the second tier of the league system, after winning promotion at the end of the 2011–12 season.

Sandweiler play their home matches at the Stade Norbert Hübsch in the town, and are currently managed by Daniel Del Col.

== Women's team ==
Sandweiler has a women's team, currently competing in the Dames Ligue 3 Series 2, the 3rd tier of women's football in Luxembourg.
