= Stade Communal, Mondercange =

Football stadium in Mondercange, Luxembourg

Stade Communal
- Interactive map of Stade Communal
- Full name: Stade Communal Mondercange
- Location: Mondercange, Luxembourg
- Coordinates: 49°32′13″N 5°58′59″E
- Capacity: 3,254
- Surface: grass (no undersoil heating)
- Field size: 105m x 68m

Construction
- Built: 1998

Tenant
- FC Mondercange

Stade Communal Mondercange is a football stadium in Mondercange, in south-western Luxembourg. It is currently the home stadium of FC Mondercange. The stadium has a capacity of 3,300. 3,000 of the capacity is standing. The other 300 of the capacity is seated with 254 of them covered.
