= Canach =

Town in Grevenmacher, Luxembourg

Canach Kanech
- Town
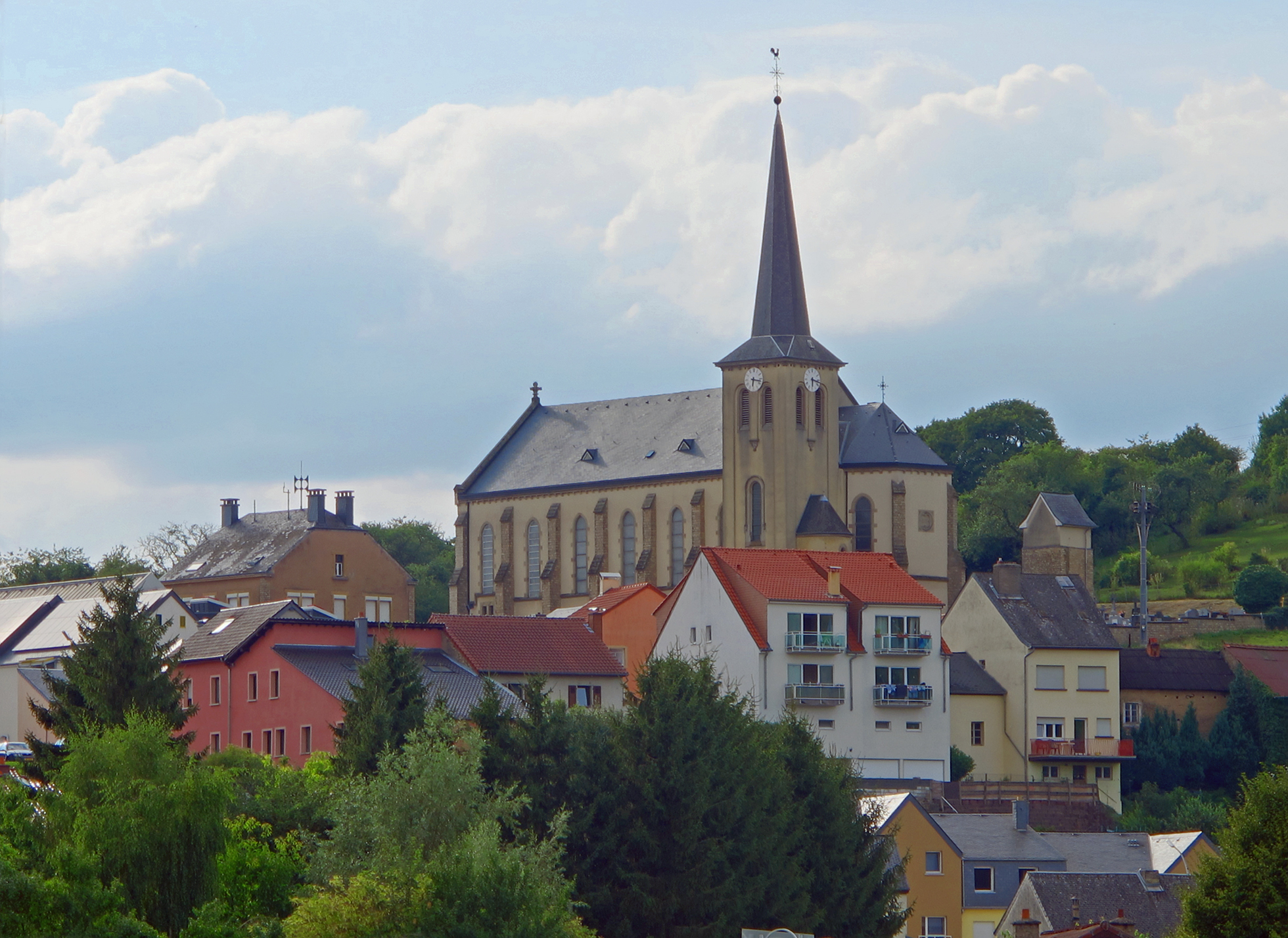
- Canach Church

- Location in Luxembourg
- Coordinates: 49°36′N 6°20′E
- State: Grand Duchy of Luxembourg
- District: Grevenmacher
- Canton: Remich
- Commune: Lenningen

Government
  - Mayor: Tim Karius

Population (2025)
  - Total: 1,707
- Time zone: UTC+1 (CET)
  - Summer (DST): UTC+2 (CEST)

Canach (Luxembourgish: Kanech) is a small town in south-eastern Luxembourg situated in the commune of Lenningen, of which it is the administrative centre.

Canach lies in the far north of the canton of Remich and is located approximately 16 km from Luxembourg City. As of September 2026, the town has a population of 1,678.

== Services ==
Canach has one bar and is the main depot of "Emile Weber", the largest bus company in Luxembourg.

== Sports ==
The town hosts the Luxembourg National Division football club FC Jeunesse Canach, who play their home games at the Stade Rue de Lenningen.

Canach is home to Luxembourg's largest golf course, the Kikuoka Country Club.
