= FC Koeppchen Wormeldange =

Association football club in Luxembourg

- Full name: Football Club Koeppchen Wormeldange
- Founded: 1919; 107 years ago
- Ground: Stade Am Ga, Wormeldange
- Capacity: 1,000
- President: Pit Sadler
- Manager: Fausto Ramos
- League: Division of Honour
- 2025–26: Division of Honour, 14th of 16
- Website: www.fckoeppchen.lu

Football Club Koeppchen Wormeldange is a football club, based in Wormeldange, in eastern Luxembourg. The club currently compete in the Division of Honour, the second tier of Luxembourgish football.
