= Stade Jos Haupert =

Football stadium in Niederkorn, Luxembourg

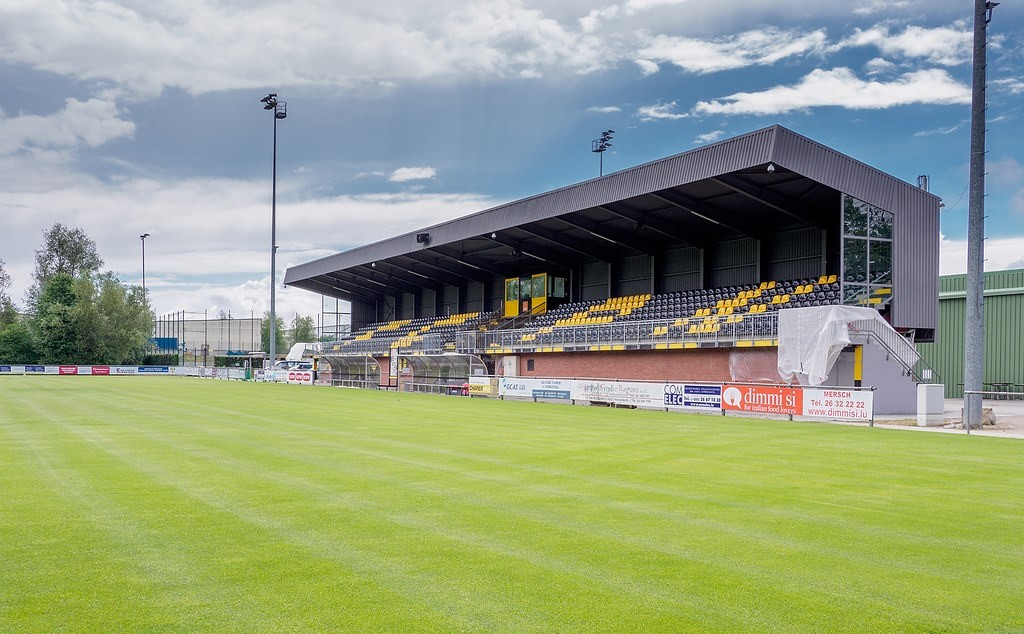
- Stade Jos Haupert in 2022
- Interactive map of Stade Jos Haupert
- Full name: Stade Jos Haupert
- Location: Niederkorn, Luxembourg
- Coordinates: 49.5461°N 5.9034°E
- Capacity: 1,976
- Surface: grass

Tenant
- FC Progrès Niederkorn

Stade Jos Haupert is a football stadium in Niederkorn, in southwestern Luxembourg. It is currently the home stadium of FC Progrès Niederkorn. The stadium has a capacity of 1,976 including 576 seats on main stand.
