= Stade Am Deich =

Football stadium in Ettelbruck, Luxembourg

Coordinates: 49°50′28″N 6°5′44″E

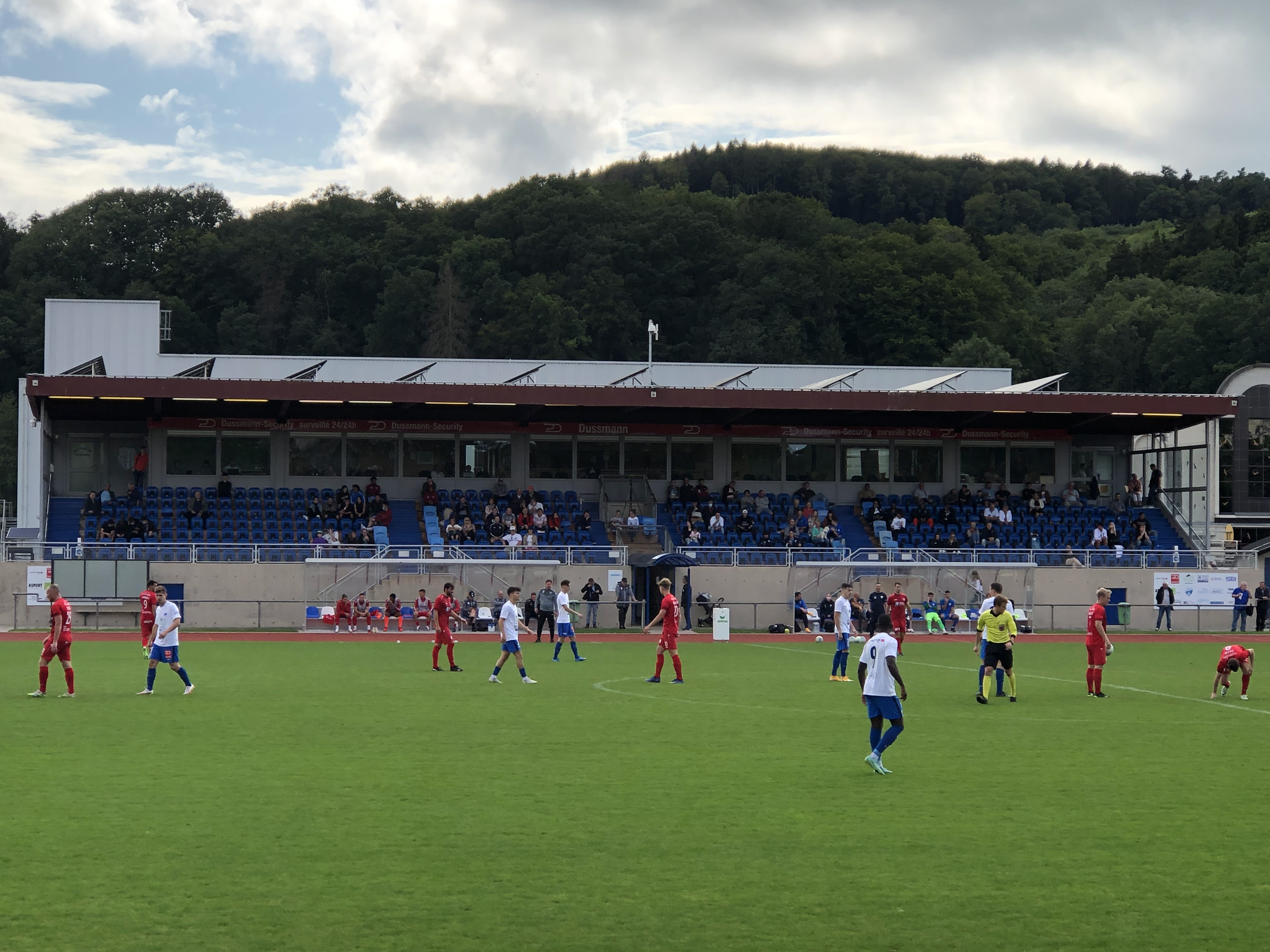
- Stade Am Deich, Ettelbruck, Luxembourg
- Interactive map of Stade Am Deich
- Full name: Stade Am Deich
- Location: Ettelbruck, Luxembourg
- Capacity: 2,020
- Surface: grass

Tenant
- FC Etzella Ettelbruck

Stade Am Deich is a football stadium in Ettelbruck, in central Luxembourg. It is currently the home stadium of FC Etzella Ettelbruck. The stadium has a capacity of about 2,020.

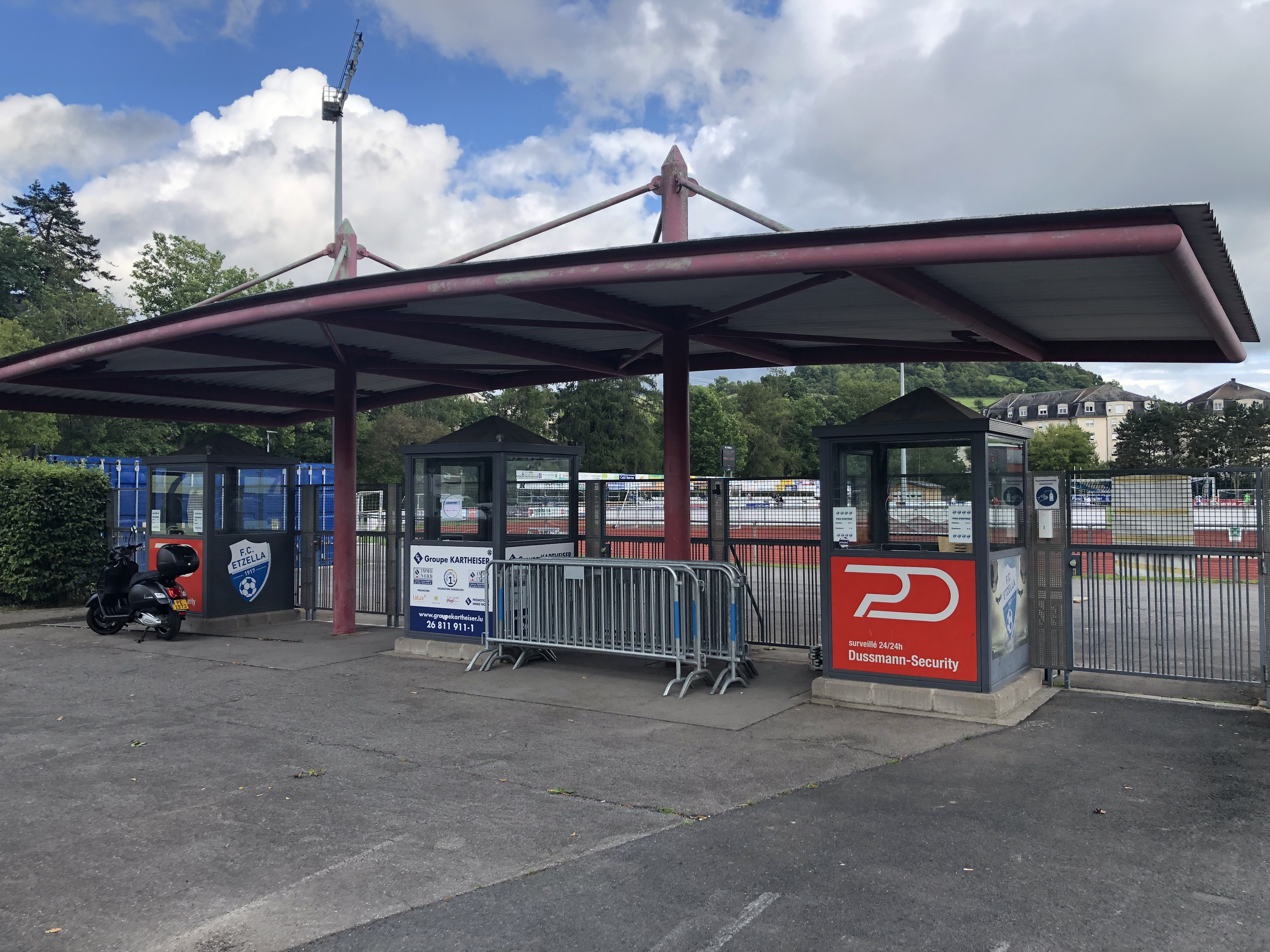
Stade Am Deich entrance gate, Ettelbruck, Luxembourg
