= Stade Fernand Weber =

Football stadium in Canach, Luxembourg

Coordinates: 49.6101°N 6.3347°E

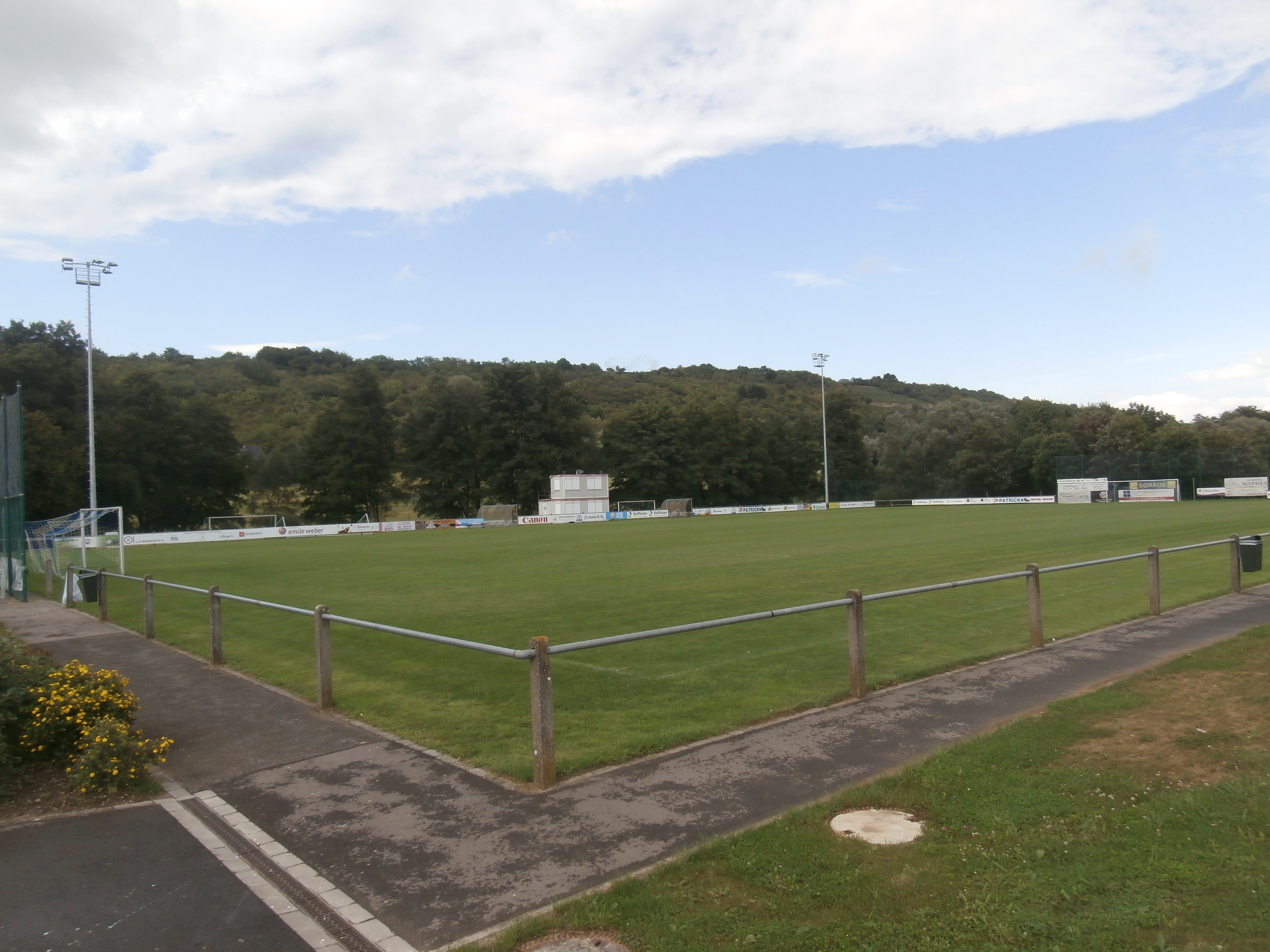
- Stade Fernand Weber, Canach, Luxembourg
- Interactive map of Stade Fernand Weber
- Full name: Stade Fernand Weber
- Former names: Stade Rue de Lenningen (until 2024)
- Location: Canach, Luxembourg
- Capacity: 1,000

Tenant
- FC Jeunesse Canach

Stade Fernand Weber is a football stadium in Canach, in south-eastern Luxembourg.

It is currently the home stadium of FC Jeunesse Canach. The stadium has a capacity of 1,000.

In 2024, the stadium was renamed from the original Stade Rue de Lenningen to honour a local businessman and patron, Fernand Weber, who died in May that year. Its previous name was Stade Rue de Lenningen.

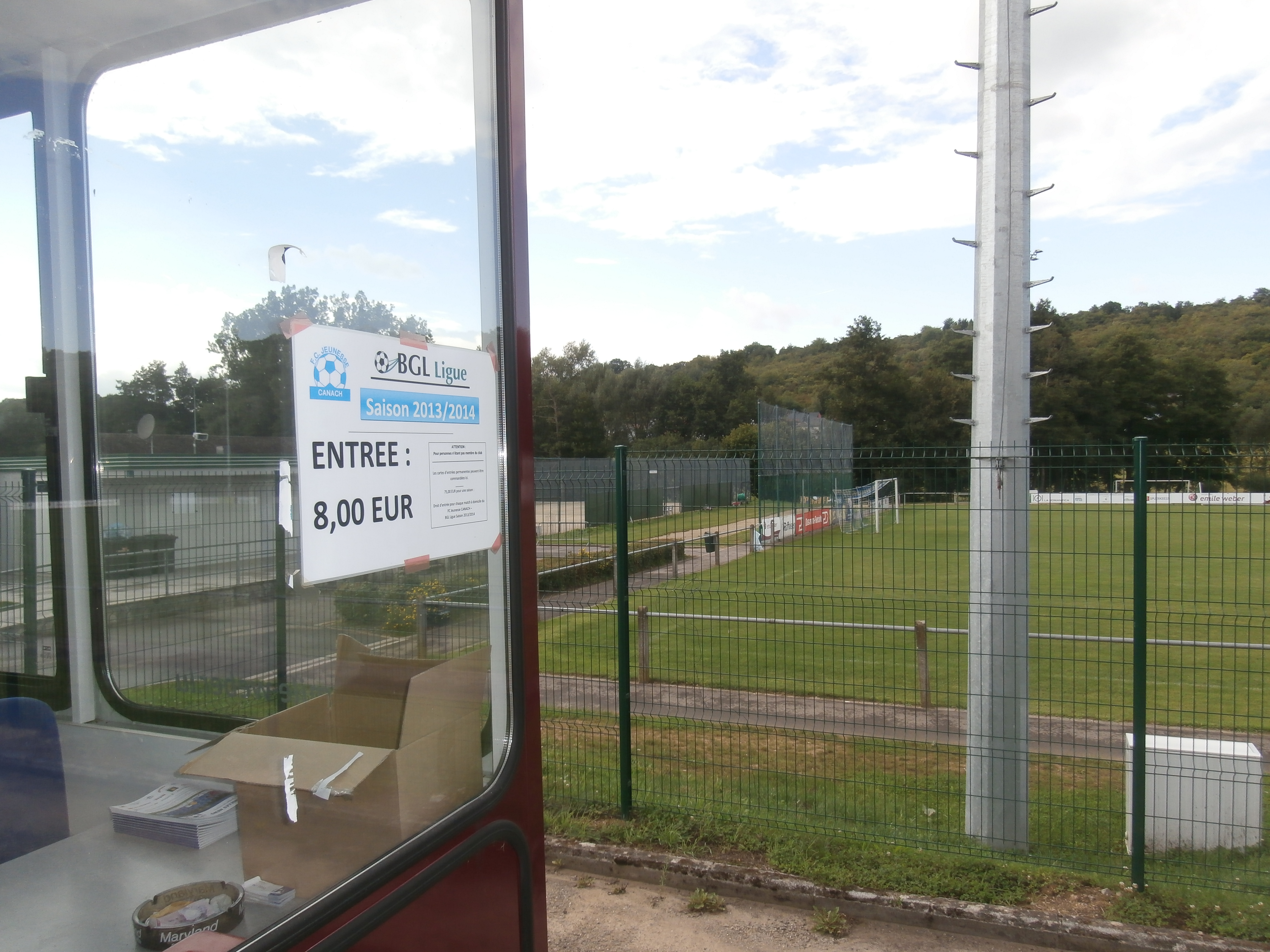
Stade Fernand Weber ticketbooth, Canach, Luxembourg
