= FC Mamer 32 =

Association football club in Luxembourg

Mamer 32
- Full name: Football Club Mamer 32
- Founded: January 1932; 94 years ago
- Ground: Stade François Trausch, Mamer
- Capacity: 2,600
- Chairman: Évariste Meyrisch
- Manager: Frédéric Herinckx
- League: Division of Honour
- 2025–26: National Division, 14th of 16 (relegated)
- Website: www.fcmamer32.lu
Home colours	Away colours

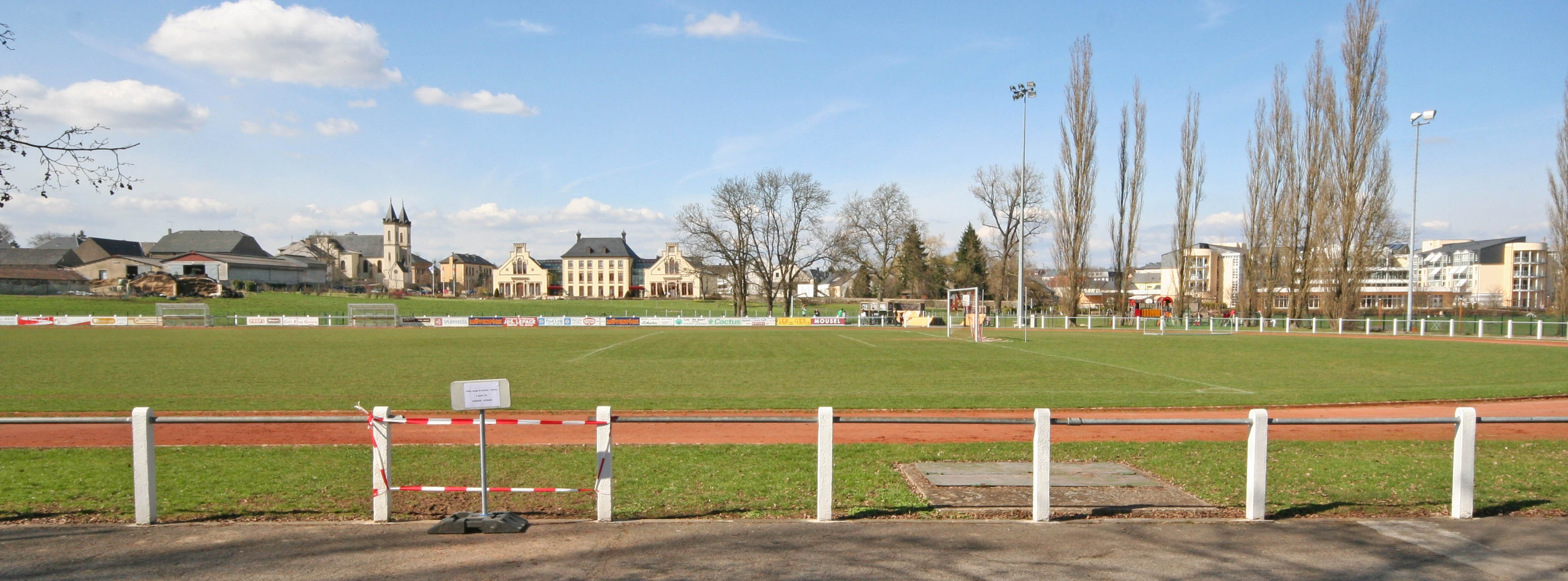
Stade François Trausch

FC Mamer 32 is a football club based in Mamer, Luxembourg. They currently compete in the Division of Honour, the second tier of Luxembourgish football

== History ==
FC Mamer was founded in January 1932. The club plied its trade in the lower leagues of Luxembourgish football for most of its first sixty years, and only reached the third tier (the 'First Division') briefly in the 1970s, before relegation again. In 1992, Mamer gained promotion to the First Division again, and solidified its position there. In 1999–2000, Mamer was promoted to the second league, the Division of Honour, but was relegated immediately. In 2004–05, Mamer reached the Division of Honour again.

Historical chart of the club's league performance

In its first season back in the higher division, Mamer finished fourth. As the top league, the National Division, was expanding from twelve teams to fourteen, Mamer was given a chance of promotion by playing against US Rumelange, who had finished bottom of their National Division relegation group. Mamer won on penalties, and was promoted to the National Division for the 2006–07 season. However, they were relegated in their first season after finishing bottom of the fourteen-team league. In 2008–09, the club were relegated to the third division.

== Current squad ==
As of 15 March 2026

Note: Flags indicate national team as defined under FIFA eligibility rules; some limited exceptions apply. Players may hold more than one non-FIFA nationality.

No.	Pos.	Nation	Player
1	GK	COD	Pépé Bonet
2	MF	GUI	Ibrahima Sylla
4	DF	LUX	Nuno Freire
5	DF	FRA	Rachid Erragui
7	DF	FRA	Adam Chams-Dine
8	MF	MNE	Aldin Bahovic
9	FW	BEL	Deniz Murić
10	FW	LUX	Igor Teles
11	FW	FRA	Mickaël Jager
13	MF	BEL	Billal Chibani
16	GK	LUX	Davide Colombo
17	FW	BEL	Blaise Baillet
18	MF	FRA	Quentin Zilli

No.	Pos.	Nation	Player
19	MF	LUX	Djibril Badji
20	DF	FRA	Yaël Mendes
22	DF	FRA	Axel Ezan
27	MF	BEL	Julien Maurice (on loan from Racing FC)
28	DF	GER	Benjamin Schmit
29	MF	LUX	David da Costa
30	MF	FRA	Maxence Agnoly
33	GK	GER	Max Schreiber
35	MF	FRA	Jawad Boisseron
49	MF	LUX	Kevin Kerger
54	DF	SEN	Yannick Biagui
97	FW	FRA	Léo Montout
99	FW	BEL	Lorenzo Rapaille
