= FC Jeunesse Canach =

Association football club in Luxembourg

Jeunesse Canach
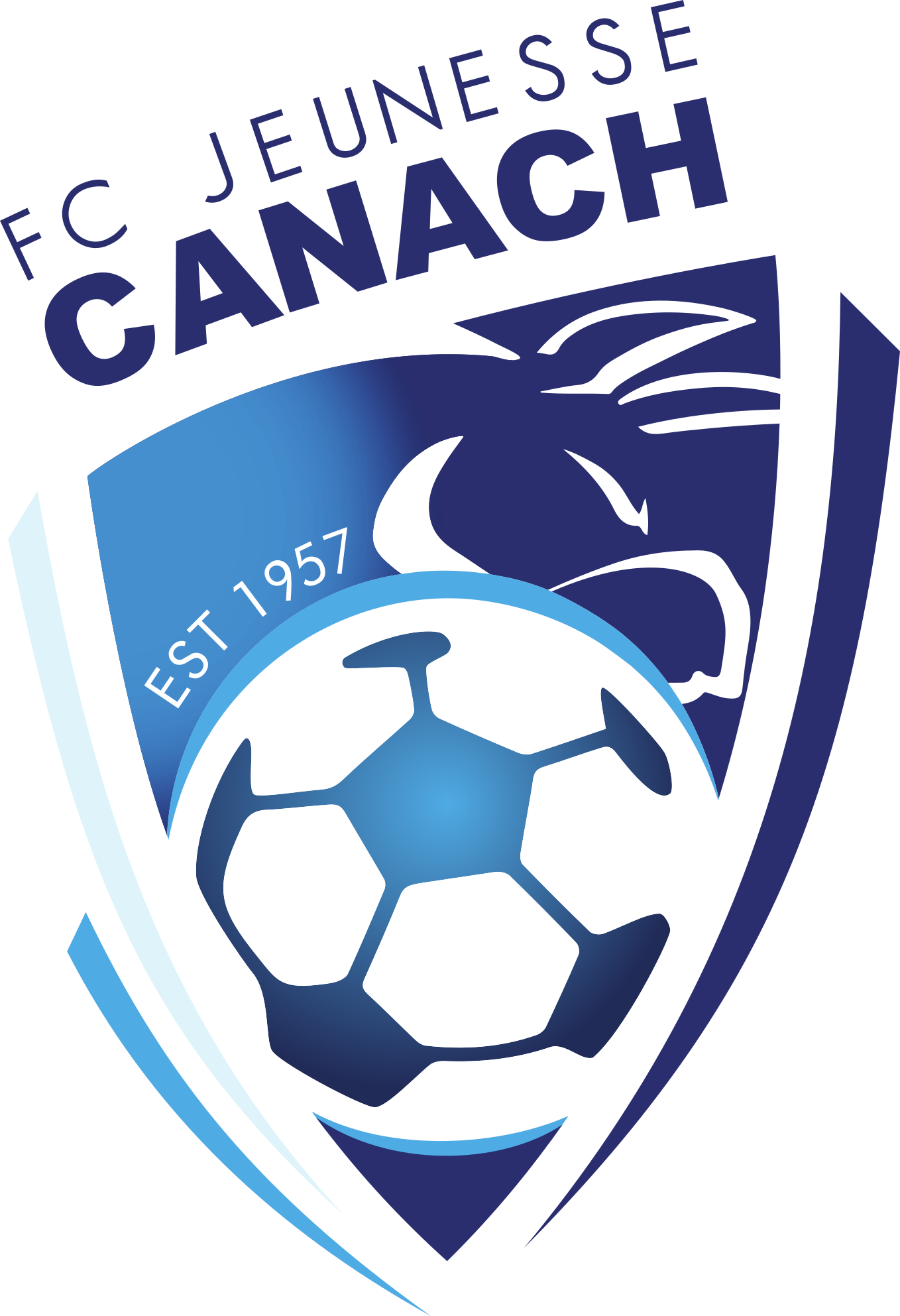
- Full name: Football Club Jeunesse Canac
- Nickname: Canach
- Founded: 27 February 1957; 69 years ago
- Ground: Stade Fernand Weber
- Capacity: 1,000
- Chairman: Arnaud Sandweiler
- Manager: Grégory Inhoff
- League: Division of Honour
- 2025–26: National Division, 13th of 16 (relegated)

FC Jeunesse Canach (English: FC Youth Canach) is a football club in Canach, Luxembourg. It was founded in 1930. They currently compete in the Division of Honour, the second tier of Luxembourgish football.

== History ==
Founded in 1930 as FC Fortuna Canach, the club was dissolved at the beginning of the Second World War. The club was reformed in 1946 and then dissolved again in 1953. In 1957, the club was revived under its current name.

The club entered the Luxembourg National Division for the first time in its history for the 2010–11 season.

Historical chart of the club's league performance

== Current squad ==
As of 14 March, 2026

Note: Flags indicate national team as defined under FIFA eligibility rules; some limited exceptions apply. Players may hold more than one non-FIFA nationality.

| No. | Pos. | Nation | Player |
|---|---|---|---|
| 1 | GK | LUX | Valentin Roulez |
| 3 | DF | BRA | Jean Lauback |
| 5 | MF | FRA | Julien Masson |
| 6 | DF | POR | Gabriel Castro |
| 7 | MF | LUX | Jun Cai Wang |
| 8 | MF | CPV | Jimmy Ines |
| 9 | FW | LUX | Balsa Perkovic |
| 10 | MF | MNE | Admir Desevic |
| 11 | FW | GBS | Nicolau Gomes |
| 12 | MF | FRA | Brian Amofa |
| 14 | FW | LUX | Maurice Deville |
| 15 | DF | FRA | Pierre Laborie |
| 17 | FW | POR | Rodrigo Parreira |
| 18 | DF | LUX | Tun Rauen |

| No. | Pos. | Nation | Player |
|---|---|---|---|
| 19 | DF | LUX | Cristiano Mendes |
| 21 | MF | LUX | Filipe Aguiar |
| 22 | MF | LUX | Tiago Costa |
| 23 | DF | POR | Xavier Araujo |
| 24 | DF | FRA | Olivier Mutamba |
| 27 | DF | FRA | Tao Sako |
| 55 | MF | FRA | Brian Rouffignac |
| 70 | FW | GBS | Arizio Badjana |
| 84 | DF | BRA | Nelsinho |
| 90 | GK | BRA | Raphaël Martins |
| 93 | DF | FRA | Thomas Cafafa |
| 96 | DF | FRA | Dylan Reihlé |
| 98 | DF | LUX | Dylan Kuete |
| 99 | GK | LUX | Dany Rodrigues |

== Current staff ==
- Manager: (Luxembourg) Grégory Inhoff
- Assistant coach: (Luxembourg) Manfred Pfortner
- Director of Football: (Luxembourg) Emile Weber

== Managers ==
- (Luxembourg) Patrick Maurer (July 1, 1998 – June 30, 2013)
- (Argentina) Fernando Gutiérrez (July 1, 2013 – November 8, 2013)
- (Luxembourg) Patrick Maurer (caretaker) (November 8, 2013 – 30 December 2015)
- (Brazil) Oseías Luiz Ferreira (January 6, 2016 − October 30, 2016)
- (Luxembourg) Patrick Maurer (October 31, 2016 − unknown)
- (France) Grégory Inhoff (October 17 2026 – present)
