= Niederkorn =

Coordinates: 49°32′N 5°54′E

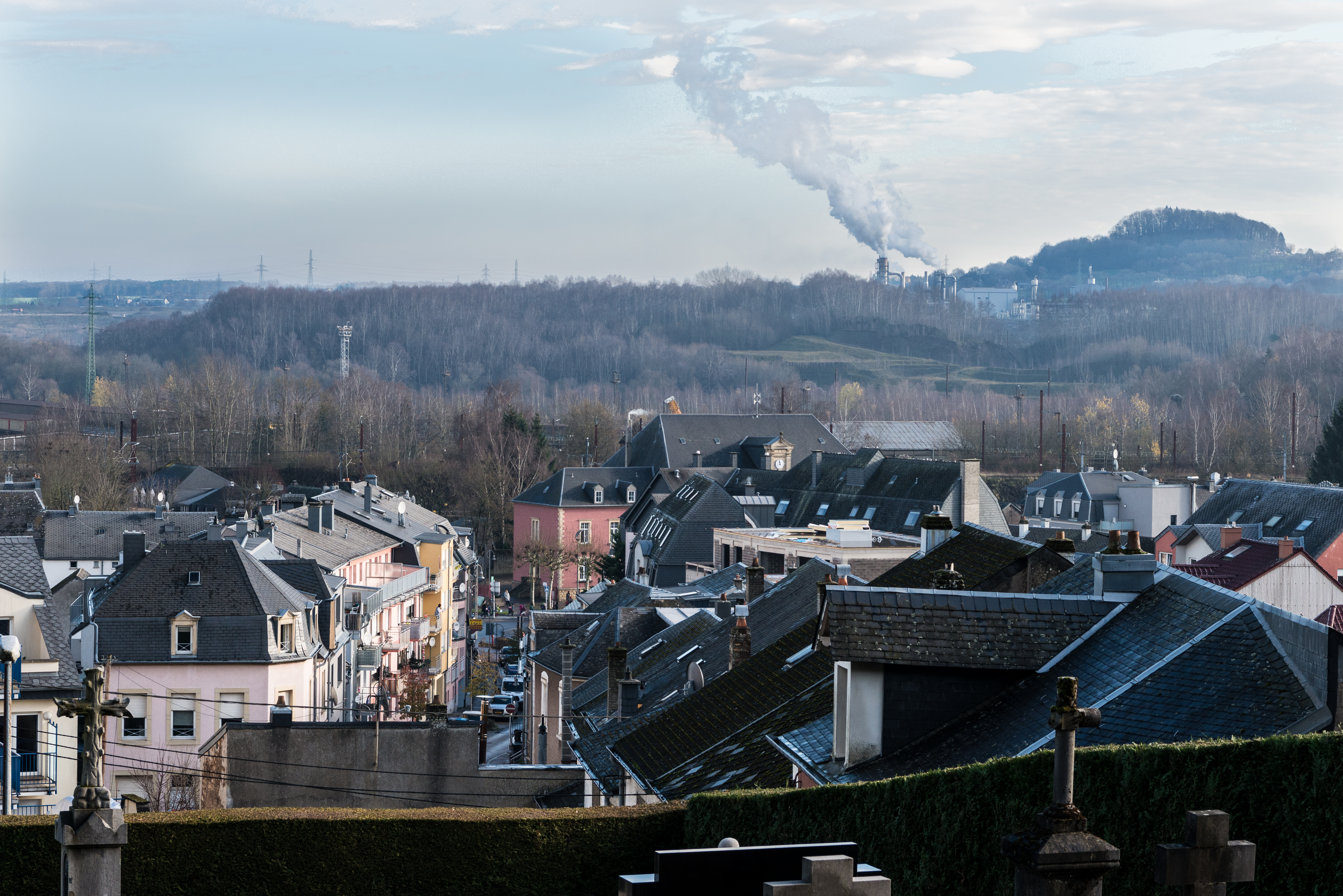
View over Niederkorn

Niederkorn ([ˈniːdɐkɔʁn]; Luxembourgish: Nidderkuer [ˈnidɐkuːɐ̯]; both lit. 'Lower Korn/Kuer', in contrast to "Upper Korn/Kuer") is a town in the commune of Differdange, in south-western Luxembourg, on the Chiers river (German: Korn), from which it takes its name. As of September 2026, the town has a population of 8,293.

Niederkorn is home to FC Progrès Niederkorn, a football team in Luxembourg's National Division.

A hospital, the "Hôpital Princesse Marie-Astrid", completed in June 2007, is located in Niederkorn .

The #1 TICE bus connects Niederkorn with Differdange, Belvaux and Esch-sur-Alzette.

Niederkorn railway station is connected to Luxembourg City via a train line that stops in Berchem, Bettembourg, Noertzange, Schifflange, Esch-sur-Alzette, Belval Université, Belval-Rédange, Belvaux Soleuvre, Oberkorn, and Differdange, before arriving in either Athus or Rodange.

Students attending Miami University Dolibois European Center are housed with families in Niederkorn, as it is a 10-minute bus ride from the chateau.

Niederkorn is the birthplace of Tessy Antony, ex-wife of Prince Louis of Luxembourg.
