= Differdange =

Differdange Déifferdeng (Luxembourgish) Differdingen (German)
- Commune
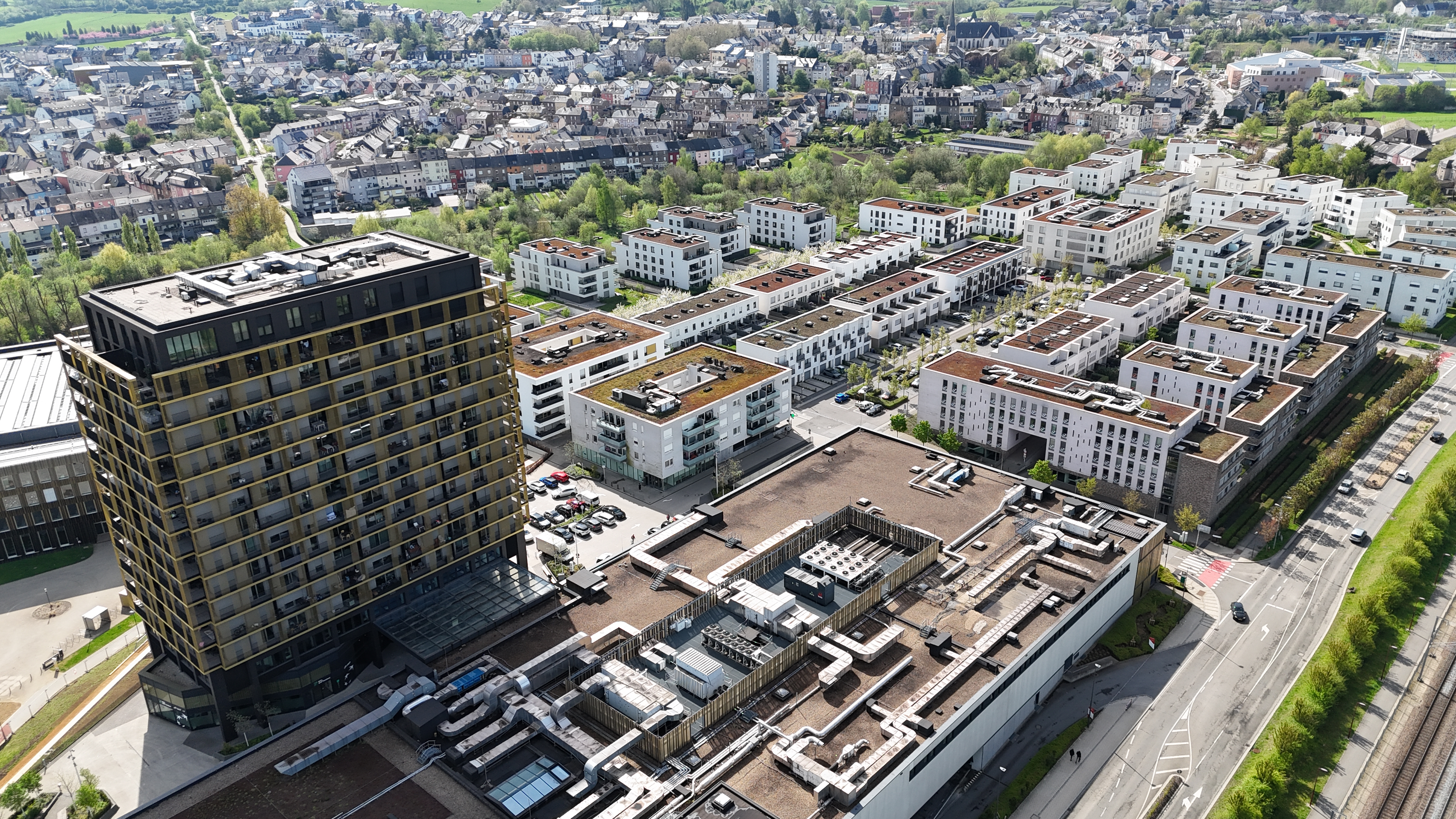
- City centre

- Coat of arms Brandmark

- Map of Luxembourg with Differdange highlighted in orange, and the canton in dark red
- Coordinates: 49.5222°N 5.8917°E
- Country: Luxembourg
- Canton: Esch-sur-Alzette

Government
  - Mayor: Guy Altmeisch (LSAP)
  - Chief Alderman: Tom Ulveling (CSV)

Area
  - Total: 22.18 km^{2} (8.56 sq mi)
  - Rank: 45th of 100
- Highest elevation: 427 m (1,401 ft)
  - Rank: 30th of 100
- Lowest elevation: 277 m (909 ft)
  - Rank: 79th of 100

Population (2025)
  - Total: 30,789
  - Rank: 3rd of 100
  - Density: 1,388/km^{2} (3,595/sq mi)
  - Rank: 5th of 100
- Time zone: UTC+1 (CET)
  - Summer (DST): UTC+2 (CEST)
- LAU 2: LU0000202
- Website: differdange.lu

Differdange (French pronunciation: [difɛʁdɑ̃ʒ]; Luxembourgish: Déifferdeng [ˈdɜɪ̯fɐdeŋ] or locally Déifferdang [ˈdɜɪ̯fɐdɑŋ]; German: Differdingen [ˈdɪfɐdɪŋən]) is a commune with city status in south-western Luxembourg, 27 kilometres (17 mi) west from the country's capital. It lies near the borders with Belgium and France and it is located in the canton of Esch-sur-Alzette. With a population of over 30,000, Differdange is the country's third largest city. It is also the main town of the commune, and other towns within the commune include Lasauvage, Niederkorn, Fousbann, and Oberkorn.

Differdange is an industrial town that was a centre of Luxembourg's steel production, with much of its development occurring during that era. Today, it remains an important industrial centre, with ArcelorMittal retaining the steel plant in the town.

Notable landmarks in Differdange include the Maison de Soins de Differdange, an ancient Cistercian abbey dating back to 1235, and the Differdange Castle, built in 1577 and located on a hill in the town centre. The castle now houses the Miami University Dolibois European Center. Differdange is also home to the football teams FC Differdange 03 and FC Progrès Niederkorn.

== History ==
=== Cistercian era ===
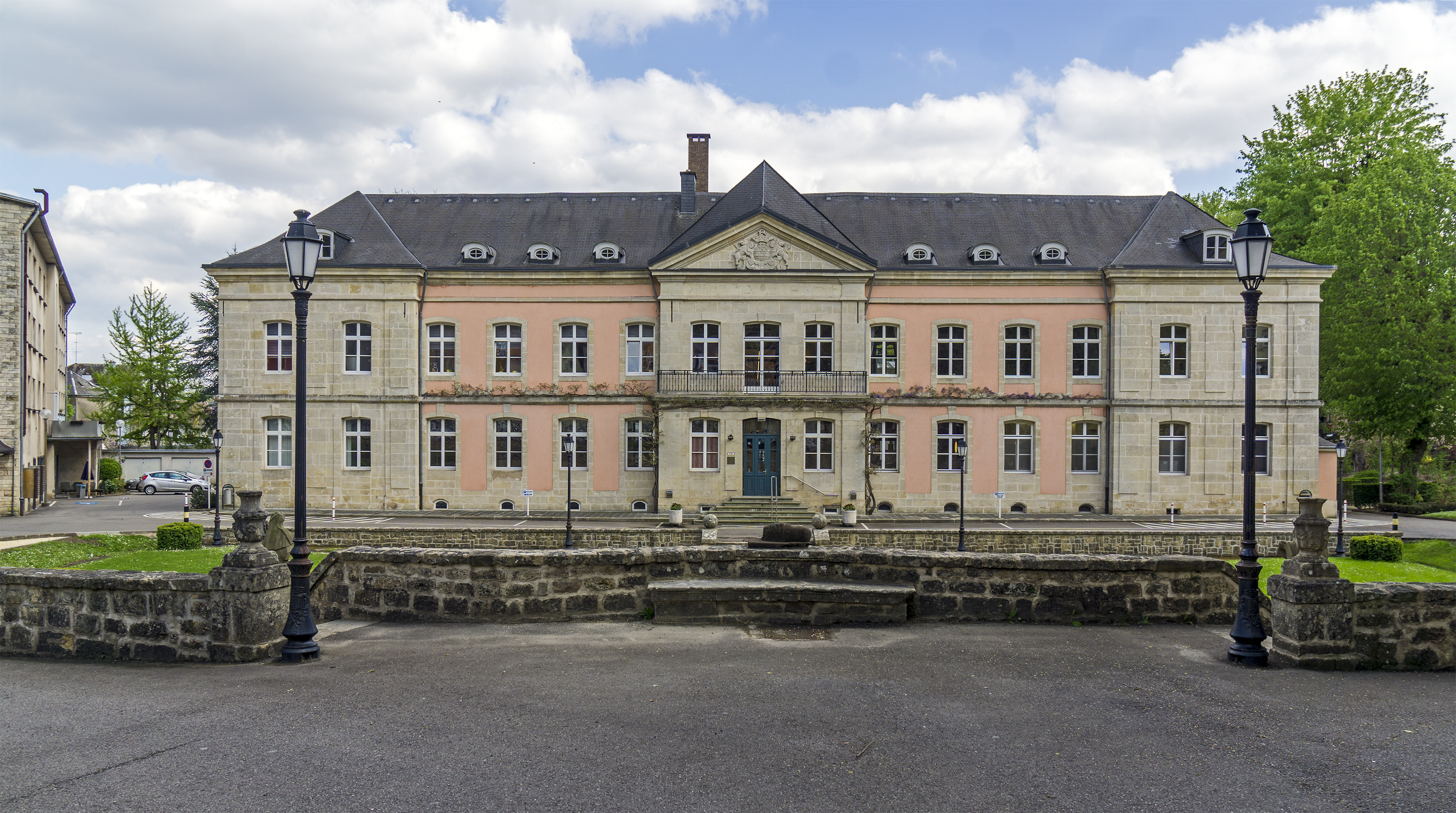
The Abbey of Differdange is an example of Cistercian architecture.

The era of the Cistercian cathedrals and abbeys was in full swing during the thirteenth century and Differdange did not deviate from this pattern. In 1235, Alexandre de Soleuvre founded the abbey of Differdange, which he donated to the order of Cîteaux. Initially, the Cistercian abbey welcomed only sisters from the nobility of Luxembourg. Subsequently, women from the Lorraine region of France and the present province of Luxembourg in Wallonia also made their vows at Differdange.

In 1552, the abbey was plundered and sacked by French soldiers. However, it was during the French invasion of Luxembourg that the abbey and the town experienced real raids and innumerable rampages.

The last abbess to direct the convent was Marie-Madeleine de Gourcy, who held office until 1796. After her mandate, the Order was then formally dissolved. The Abbey of Differdange was auctioned off in 1797 and subsequently be bought by the commune of Differdange in 1929. In 1981 following its purchase by government of Luxembourg, the Differdange Abbey was transformed into a hospital and health center.

=== Renaissance era ===
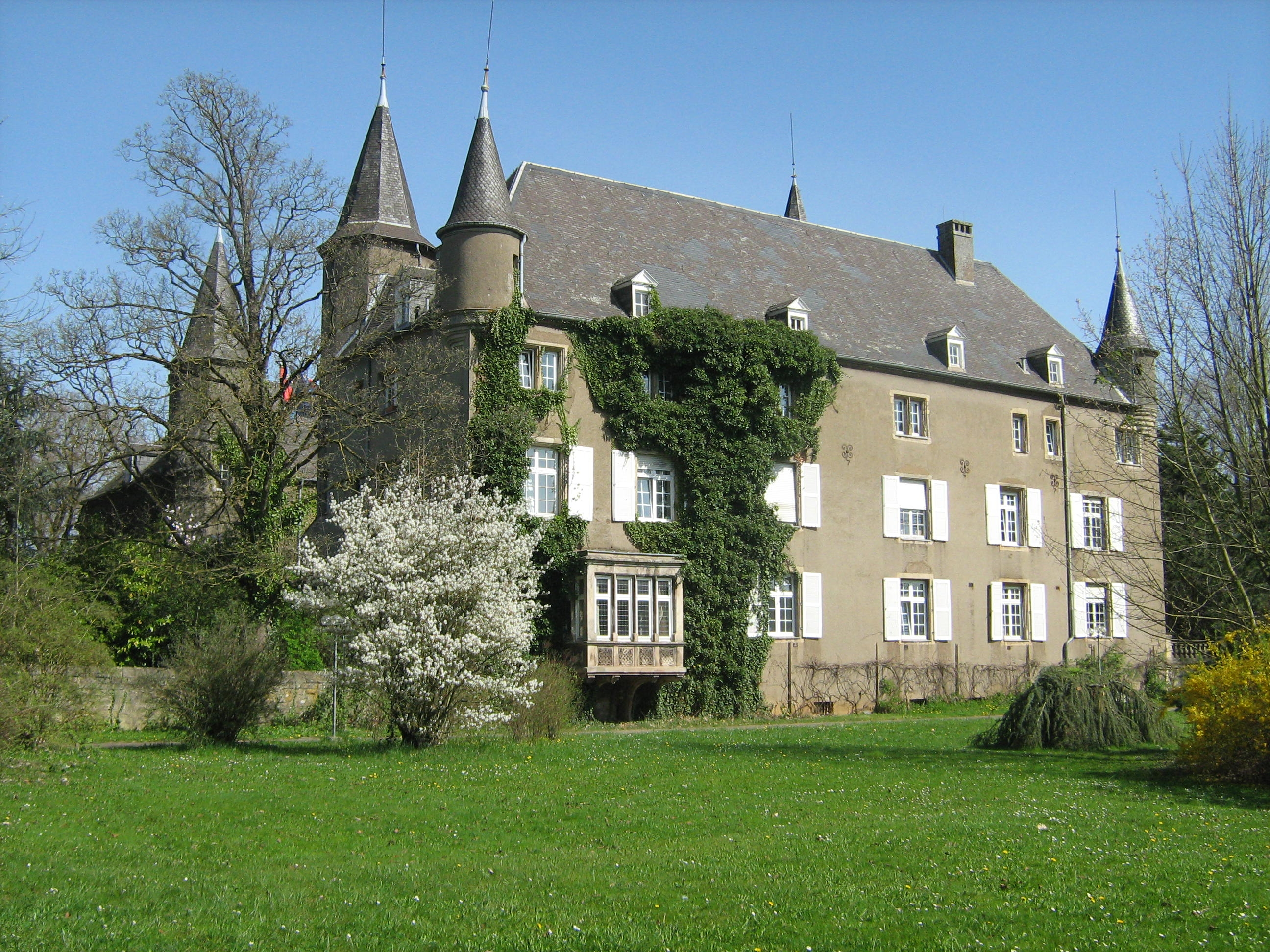
The Differdange Castle currently serves as the European campus of Miami University.

The Differdange Castle is one of the only remaining landmarks from the Renaissance period in the area. Although it has no known origin since all traced manuscripts have disappeared, squire listed was Wilhelm de Differdange, named in documents dating from 1310. The castle is probably the earliest example in Luxembourg of a château built entirely in the Renaissance style. It was intended as a residence and a fortification. Differdange's descendants were extinguished in 1400 with the death of his last grandson.

In 1552, the castle underwent a disastrous fire. It was eventually restored and occupied by Anna of Isenburg. In 1794, the French Revolutionary Army committed atrocities in Differdange and slaughtered many unarmed civilians before pillaging and burning the city.

=== Steel industry to present ===
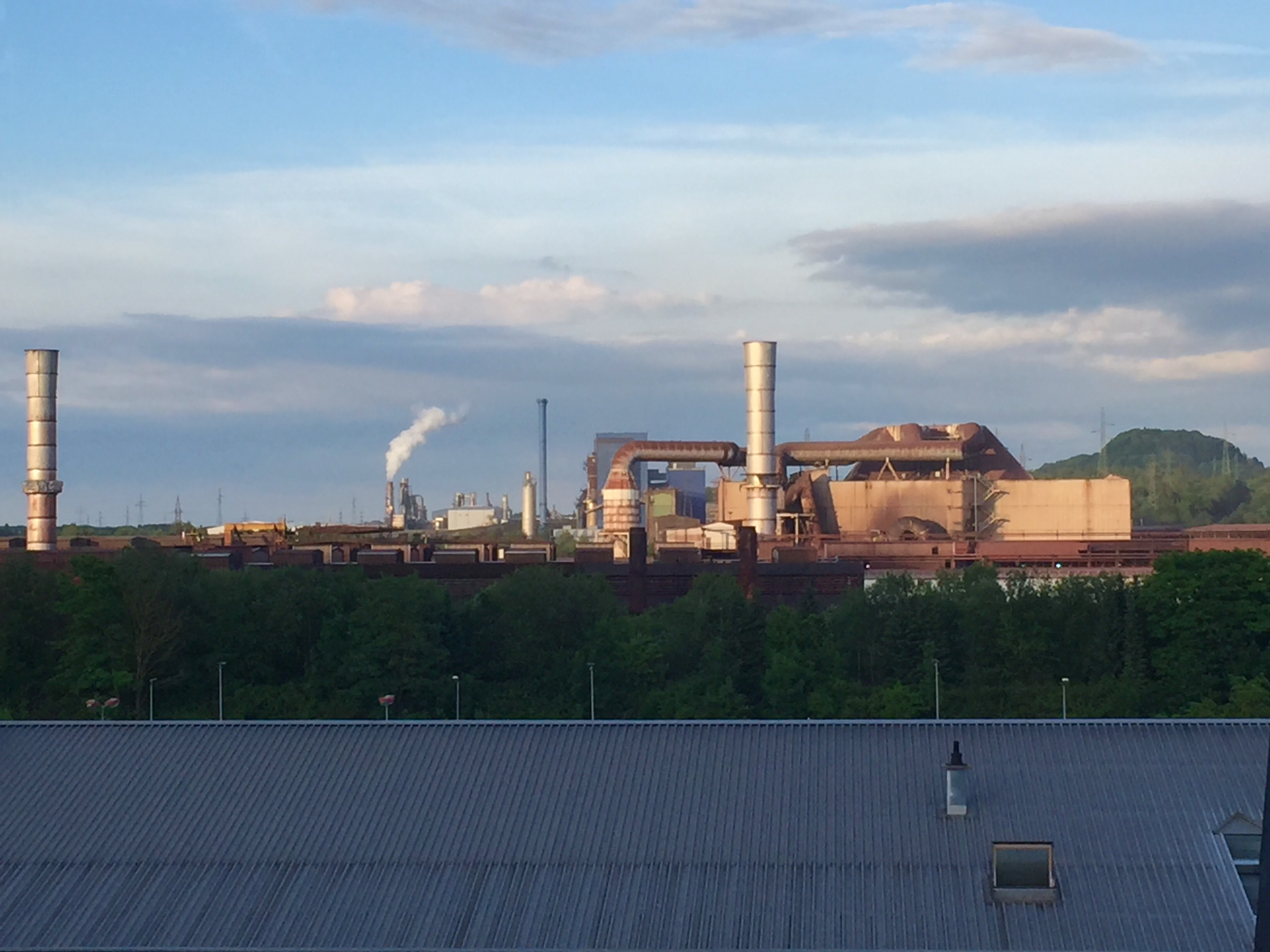
Differdange steel mill, operated by Luxembourg steel company ArcelorMittal

Beginning in 1830, Luxembourg's steel industry evolved from and artisan stage to an industrial stage. In 1896, two blast furnaces were erected in Differdange with the name of "Société Anonyme des Hauts-Fourneaux de Differdange". Subsequently, eight other blast furnaces were built, allowing the production of steel beams known at the time as "Differdinger".

On 4 August 1907, Differdange received its town status from Grand Duke William IV. During the 20th century, the industrial boom was at its peak, and the population of Differdange rose from less than 4,000 in 1890 to almost 18,000 by 1930. In 1967, the "Société des Hauts-Fourneaux and Aciererie de Differdange" merged with several steel companies in Belgium and France to form ARBED, Luxembourg's largest steel company, which had numerous factories in Differdange.

== Geography ==
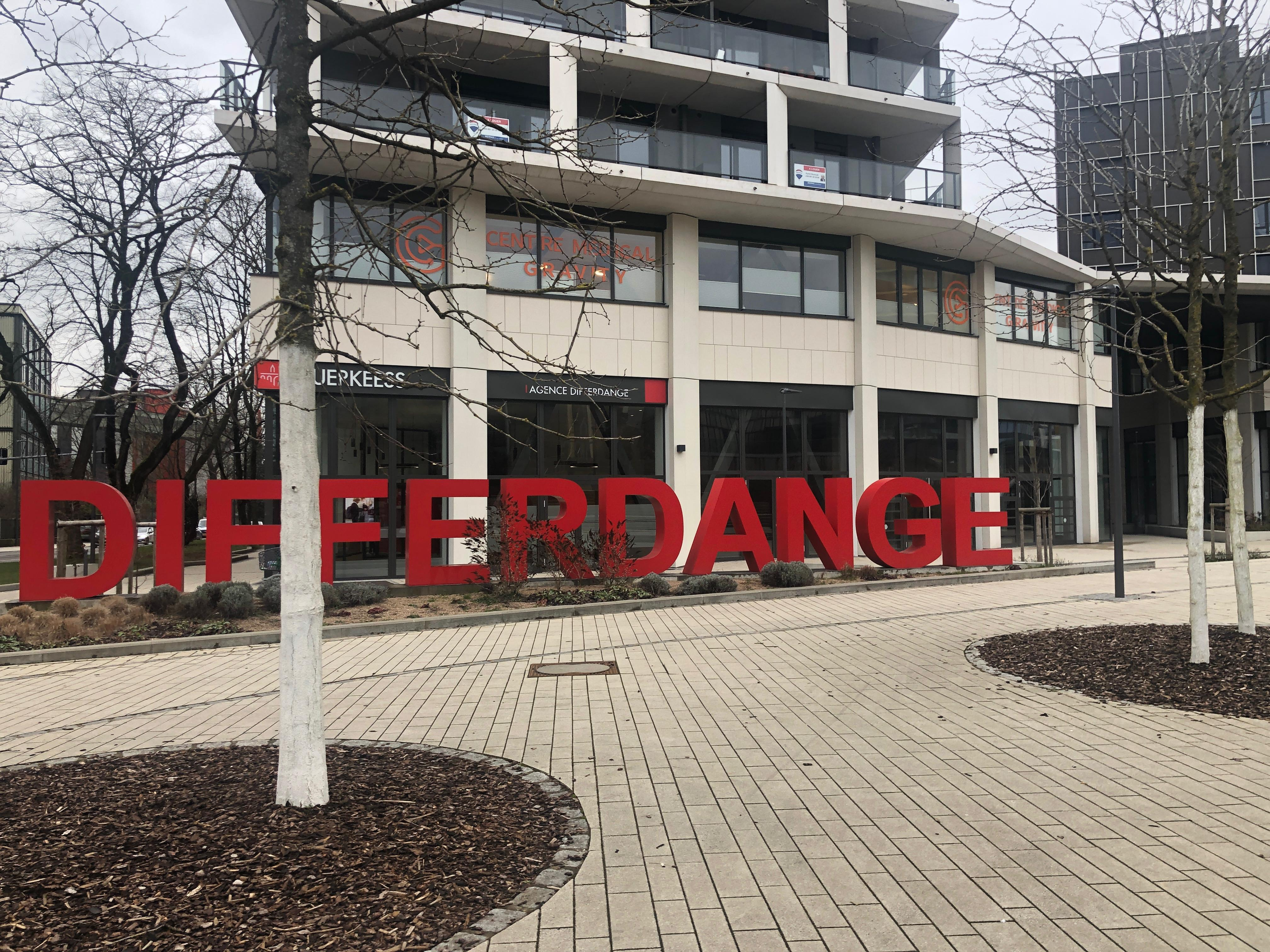
Differdange sign at Opkorn

The town is located in the plateau of the river Chiers, a tributary of the river Meuse which takes its source in the section of Oberkorn. Differdange has an altitude of 293 meters, the highest point of the municipality being at 427,1m at Koufeld. The commune spreads over 2,215 hectares. Its territory borders France, through the department of Meurthe-et-Moselle in the basin of Longwy.

=== Populated places ===
- Differdange (commune seat)
- Lasauvage
- Niederkorn
- Oberkorn
- Fousbann

== Population ==
Historical population

Year	Pop.	±%
1821	1,655	—
1851	2,175	+31.4%
1871	2,162	−0.6%
1880	2,624	+21.4%
1890	3,574	+36.2%
1900	8,756	+145.0%
1910	13,909	+58.9%
1922	12,983	−6.7%
1930	17,567	+35.3%

Year	Pop.	±%
1947	15,179	−13.6%
1960	17,637	+16.2%
1970	17,964	+1.9%
1981	16,726	−6.9%
1991	15,740	−5.9%
2001	18,172	+15.5%
2011	21,935	+20.7%
2021	28,532	+30.1%
2024	30,364	+6.4%

Source: Le Portail des Statistiques du Luxembourg

== Transport ==
- Differdange railway station
- Oberkorn railway station
- Niederkorn railway station

== Notable people ==
- Émile Krieps (1920–1998), a resistance leader, soldier, and politician
- Jean Portante (born 1950), a writer of novels, stories, plays, journalistic articles and poetry; resides in Paris
- Josiane Kartheiser (born 1950), a journalist, novelist, and writer
- Nico Helminger (born 1953), an author of poetry, novels, plays and libretti for operas
- Georges Hausemer (1957–2018), a writer of short stories, novels, travelogues and non-fictional works
- Jean-Claude Hollerich S.J. (born 1958), archbishop of the Roman Catholic Archdiocese of Luxembourg since 2011 and Cardinal of the Catholic Church

=== Politics ===
- Nicholas Muller (1836–1917), banker & US Representative from New York
- Nicolas Kremer (1916–2001), a politician
- Yvonne Useldinger (1921–2009), a politician
- Marcelle Lentz-Cornette (1927–2008), schoolteacher and politician
- Fred Sunnen (1939–2014), a politician
- Johny Lahure (1942–2003), a politician and minister
- Félix Braz (born 1966), a politician, former Deputy Prime Minister

=== Sport ===
- Michael Maurer (1904–1983), a boxer who competed in the 1924 Summer Olympics
- Fernand Ciatti (1912–1989) a boxer, competed at the 1936 Summer Olympics
- Paul Anen (1918–1978) a fencer, competed at the 1948 and 1952 Summer Olympics
- Jean-Fernand Leischen (1919–2017) a fencer, competed in three Summer Olympics
- Josy Stoffel (1928–2021), gymnast, competed in 5 consecutive Summer Olympics in 1948, 1952, 1956, 1960 & 1964
- Rudy Kugeler (1928-1992), a fencer, competed in the team épée at the 1960 Summer Olympics
- Fernand Backes (born 1930), a boxer, competed at the 1952 Summer Olympics
- François Konter (1934–2018), a footballer, played 77 games for the national side
- Roger Menghi (born 1935), a fencer, competed in the individual épée event at the 1976 Summer Olympics
- Roby Hentges (born 1940), a former cyclist, competed in the individual road race at the 1960 Summer Olympics
- Alain Anen (born 1950–2025), a fencer, competed in the individual and team épée events at the 1972 Summer Olympics
- Fiona Steil-Antoni (born 1989), a Luxembourgish chess player.

== Twin towns ==
Differdange is twinned with:

- Ahlen, Germany
- Chaves, Portugal
- Fiuminata, Italy
- Longwy, France
- Oxford, United States
- Waterloo, Belgium
