= Differdange Castle =

Château in Differdange, Luxembourg

Coordinates: 49°31′17″N 5°53′18″E

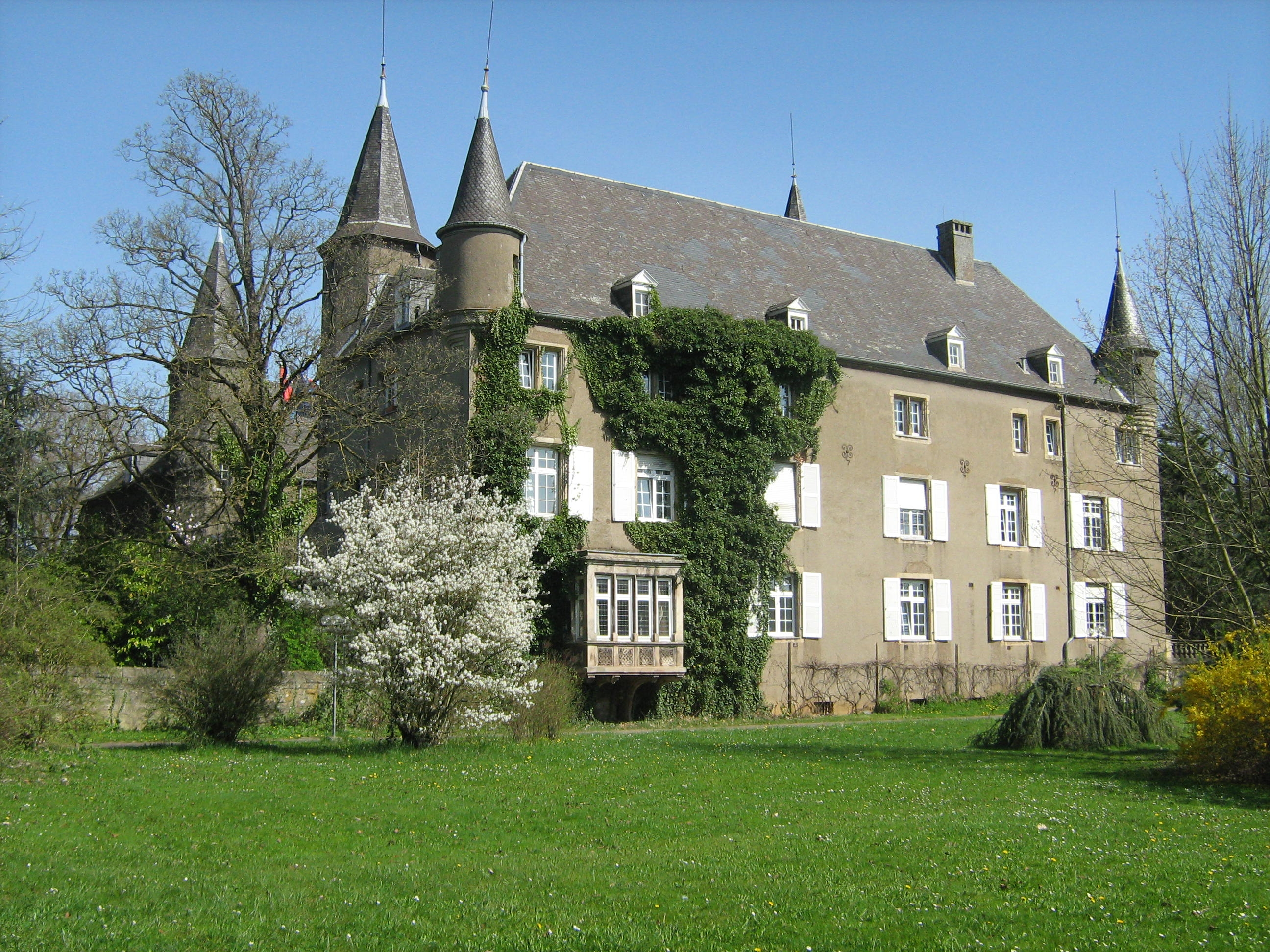
Differdange Castle

Differdange Castle (Luxembourgish: Schlass Déifferdeng; French: Château de Differdange; German: Schloss Differdingen) is a Renaissance-era château located on a hill in the centre of Differdange in southern Luxembourg. It was built in 1577, although an earlier fortified castle of Differdange dates from around 1310. It has been the campus of Miami University Dolibois European Center since 1997.

== History ==
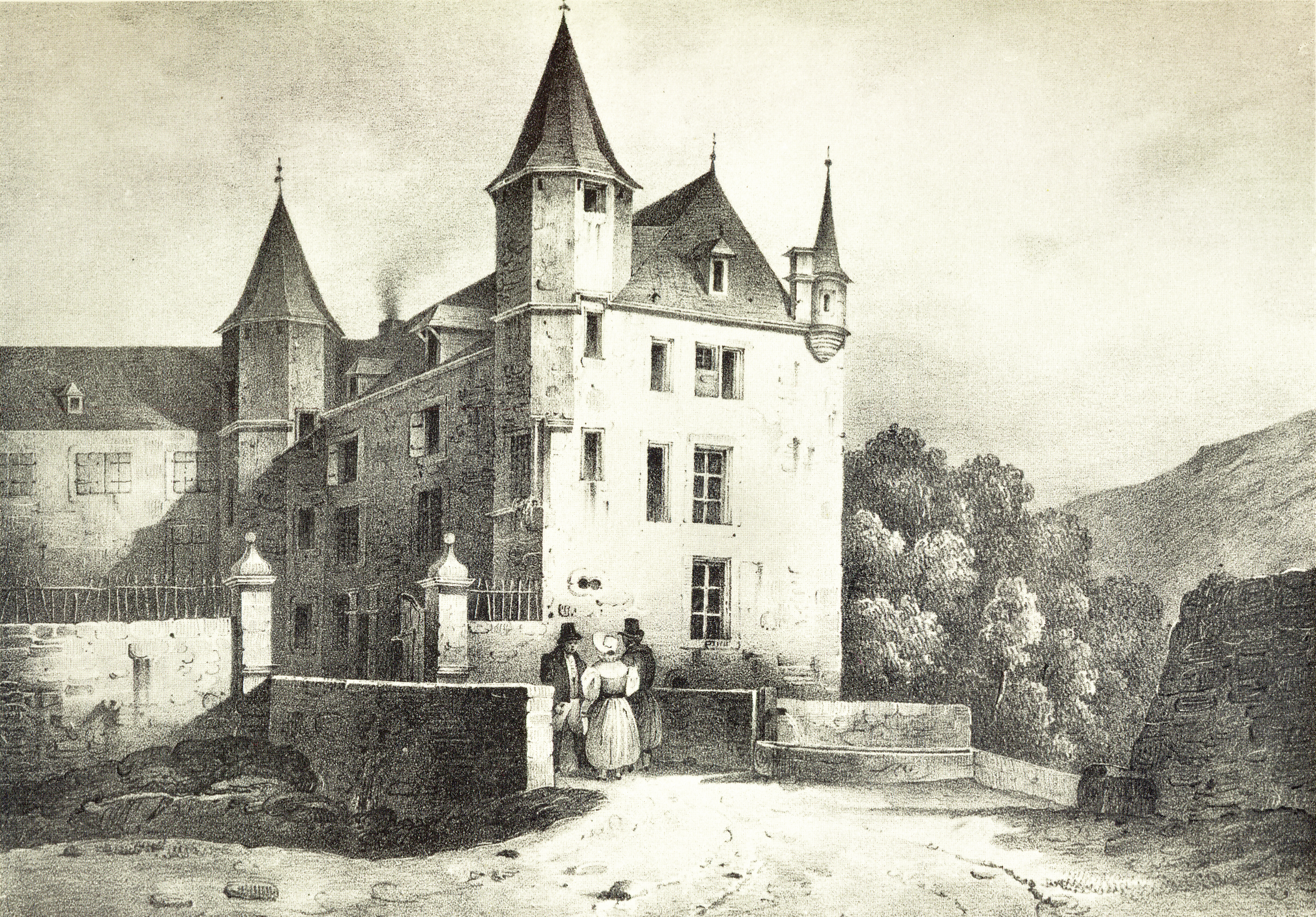
Nicolas Liez: Historic drawing of Differdange Castle (1834)

The first lord of Differdange Castle was Wilhelm, brother of the Lord of Soleuvre, who is mentioned in documents from 1310 when he owned a fortified castle. However, the lords of Differdange lasted only until the death of Wilhelm's grandson around the year 1400. When Soleuvre Castle burnt down 28 May 1552, the owner Anna von Insenburg decided not to repair it but to build a Renaissance-style residential castle in Differdange serving both Soleuvre and Differdange.

In 1794, while the French Revolutionary Wars were raging in Europe, Luxembourg was under siege. Differdange was situated between the House of Habsburg in Luxembourg City, and the French invaders of Longwy. Differdange "consequently morphed into a target of the bellicose French troops on more than one tragic occasion. The local abbey and the castle [of Differdange] became the scene of many violent altercations because they were perceived as symbols of the feudal system."

At the beginning of the 20th century, the castle came into the hands of the local steel industry ARBED who used it as a hotel and a restaurant for its staff until it became the Miami University Dolibois European Center in 1997. The center is named in honour of former American ambassador to Luxembourg, John E. Dolibois.

== Architecture ==
Differdange Castle is probably the earliest example in Luxembourg of a château built entirely in the Renaissance style. It was intended as a residence and a fortification with a moat and drawbridge (now both removed) as well as loopholes. It is constructed fully in accordance with the principles of Renaissance architecture, especially the use of the square both for the courtyard (15 by 15 metres) and the outer walls of the three buildings (30 by 30 metres) which surround it. The rectangular cross-framed windows are typical of the period. The octagonal towers are slightly higher than the central building.

== See also ==
- List of castles in Luxembourg

== Gallery ==
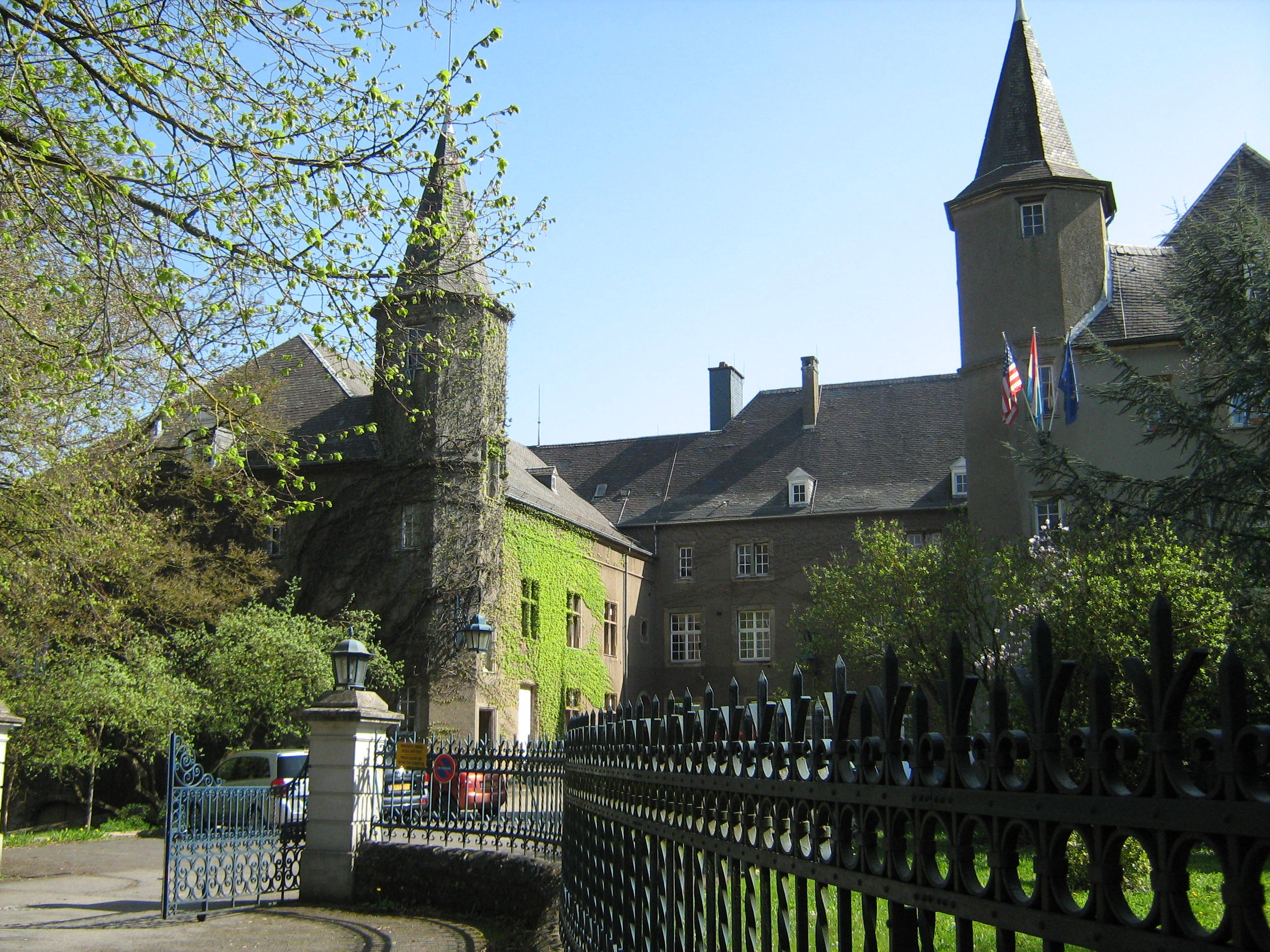
Main entrance

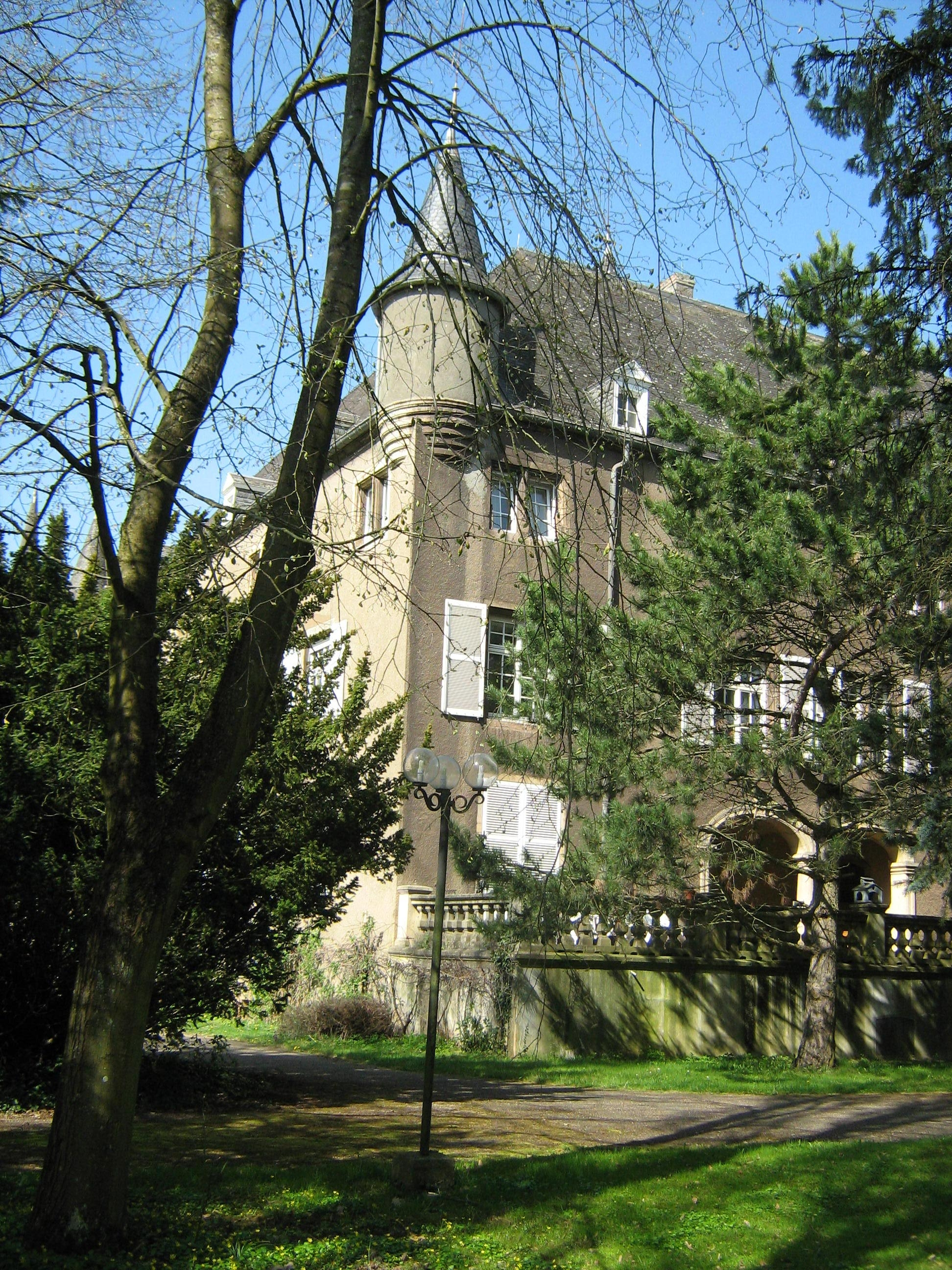
South-eastern tower

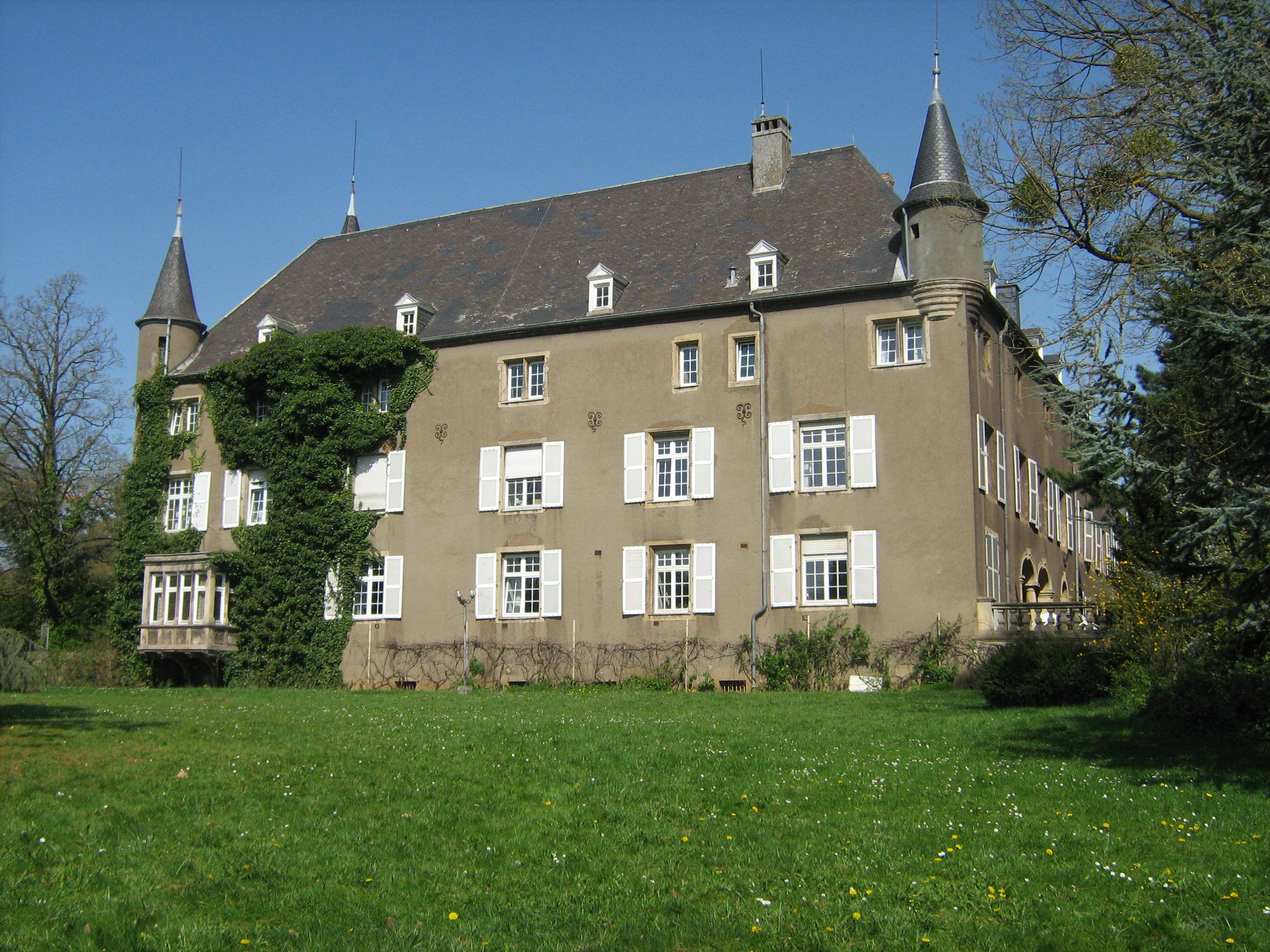
The southern facade

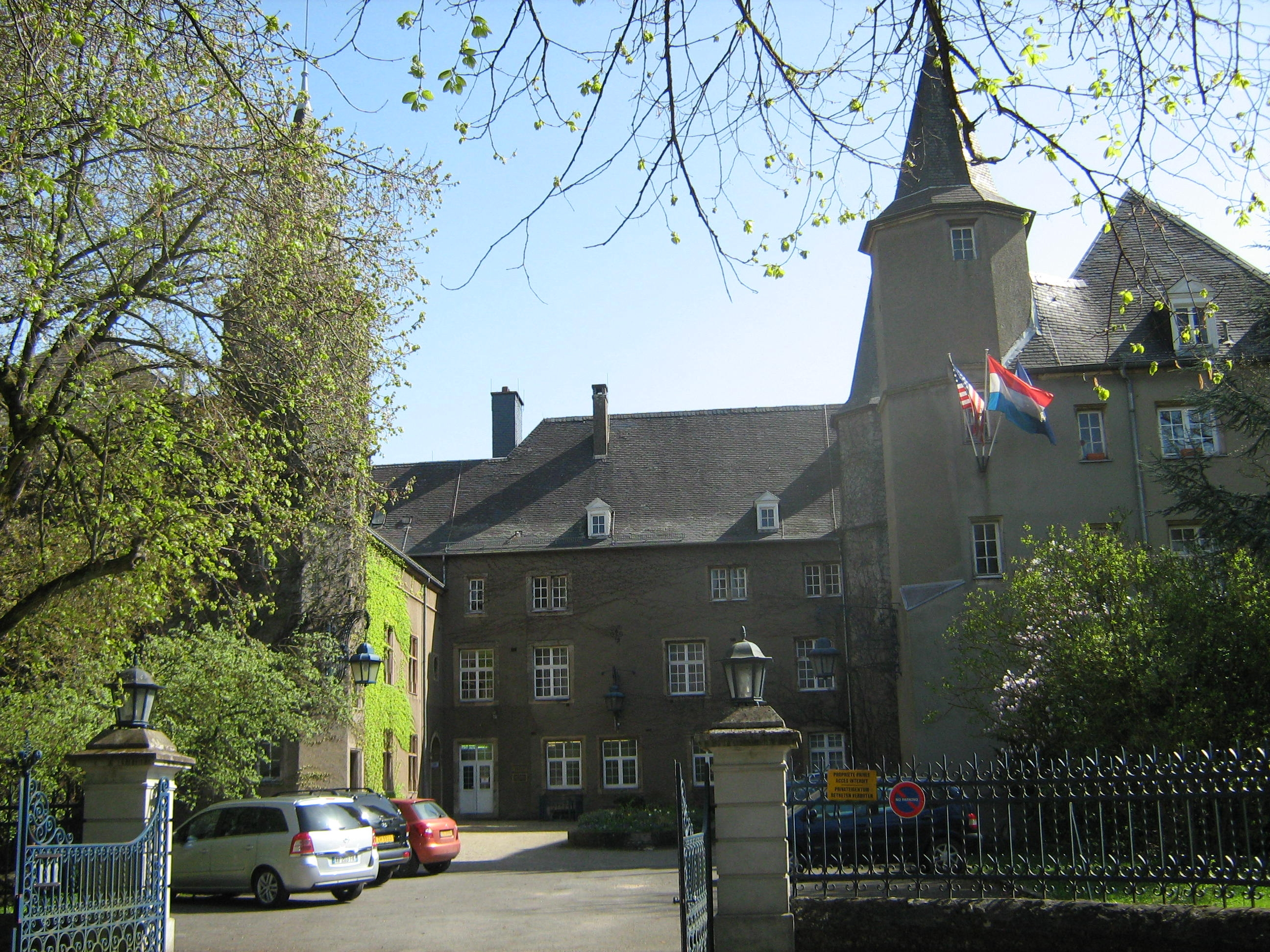
The square courtyard
