= Fordham International Law Journal =

- Discipline: Law
- Language: English
- Edited by: William Russell

Publication details
- History: 1977–present
- Publisher: Fordham University School of Law (United States)

Standard abbreviations
- Bluebook: Fordham Int'l L.J.
- ISO 4: Fordham Int. Law J.

Indexing
- ISSN: 0747-9395
- OCLC no.: 52769025

Links
- Journal homepage; Online access; Online archive

The Fordham International Law Journal is a student-run law journal associated with the Fordham University School of Law. According to the Washington and Lee journal rankings, it is the 4th most cited student-edited international and comparative law journal in the United States. The current editor-in-chief is William Russell.

== History ==
The Fordham International Law Journal ("the ILJ" or "ILJ") was established in 1977 at the Fordham University School of Law. It was founded at that time as the Fordham International Law Forum. The ILJ attracts contributions from prominent statespersons and members of the academic, legal, and political communities. ILJ pieces have been cited in numerous US federal court decisions, US Supreme Court briefs and decisions, international courts decisions, law review articles, and CFR and ALR annotations.

The ILJ publishes five books annually covering diverse foreign and international legal topics and containing scholarly articles, essays, book reviews, and student pieces. The ILJ also publishes an annual Crowley Report in association with Fordham's Leitner Center for International Law and Justice. The ILJ assists in the organization and production of the Fordham Corporate Law Institute's Conference on International Antitrust Law and Policy, the Leitner/Stein Colloquium, and the New York City Bar Association's reception for the legal advisers of the foreign ministries of the United Nations. The ILJ maintains an especially strong relationship with officials from the European Union and one book in each volume is devoted to EU law. Past volumes have included contributions from judges on the European Court of Justice, commissioners of the European Commission, and other senior EU officials.

== Significant articles ==
- Madeleine Albright, International Law Approaches in the Twenty-First Century: A U.S. Perspective on Enforcement, 18 FORDHAM INT'L L.J. 1595 (1995)
- Kofi Annan, Advocating for an International Criminal Court, 21 FORDHAM INT'L L.J. (1997)
- Boutros Boutros-Ghali, The Role of International Law in the Twenty-First Century: A Grotian Moment, 18 FORDHAM INT'L L.J. 1609 (1995)
- Daniel J. Capra, Selecting an Appropriate Federal Court in An International Antitrust Case: Personal Jurisdiction and Venue, 9 FORDHAM INT'L L.J. 401–82 (1986).
- Richard J. Goldstone, The Trial of Saddam Hussein: What Kind of Court Should Prosecute Saddam Hussien and Others for Human Rights Abuses?, 27 FORDHAM INT'L L.J. 1490 (2004)
- Peter Hansen & Victoria Aranda, An Emerging International Framework for Trans-national Corporations, 14 FORDHAM INT'L L.J. 881 (1991).
- Philippe Kirsch, The Preparatory Commission for the International Criminal Court, 25 FORDHAM INT'L L.J. 563 (2002)
- Philippe Kirsch, The International Criminal Court: A New and Necessary Institution Meriting Continued International Support, 28 FORDHAM Int'l L.J. 292 (2005)
- Joseph M. McLaughlin, The Unification of Germany: What Would Jhering Say?, 17 FORDHAM INT'L L.J. 277 (1994).
- John L. Murray, The Influence of the European Convention on Fundamental Rights on Community Law, 33 FORDHAM INT'L L.J. 1388 (2010).

== Notable alumni ==
- Jean Broward Shevlin Gerard, ambassador to UNESCO and after the US withdrawal from UNESCO, to Luxembourg;
- Marjorie Martin, Administrative Law Judge for the City of New York;
- William O'Connor, partner and management board member of Crowell & Moring LLP;
- Cheryl Matthews, Judge, Oakland County Circuit Court
- Barbara Gaden, Judge, Richmond General District Court
- Michael Kaplan, Judge, United States District Court for the District of New Jersey
- Melissa Jackson, New York City Criminal Court
- Michael Feierman, General Counsel, Barnard College
- Paul Paquin, Deputy Solicitor General, Virgin Islands Department of Justice
- W. Michael Sweeney, Head Writer, Tonight Show with Conan O'Brien
- Silvia Eiriz, Political and Economic Counselor, US Embassy for the Ivory Coast
- Louise Firestone, Senior-Vice President and General Counsel, LVMH Moet Hennessy Louis Vuitton, Inc.
- Sarah Francois-Poncet, Chief Legal Officer and General Counsel, Chanel
