= Belval-Lycée railway station =

Railway station in Luxembourg

Coordinates: 49°30′04″N 05°55′31″E

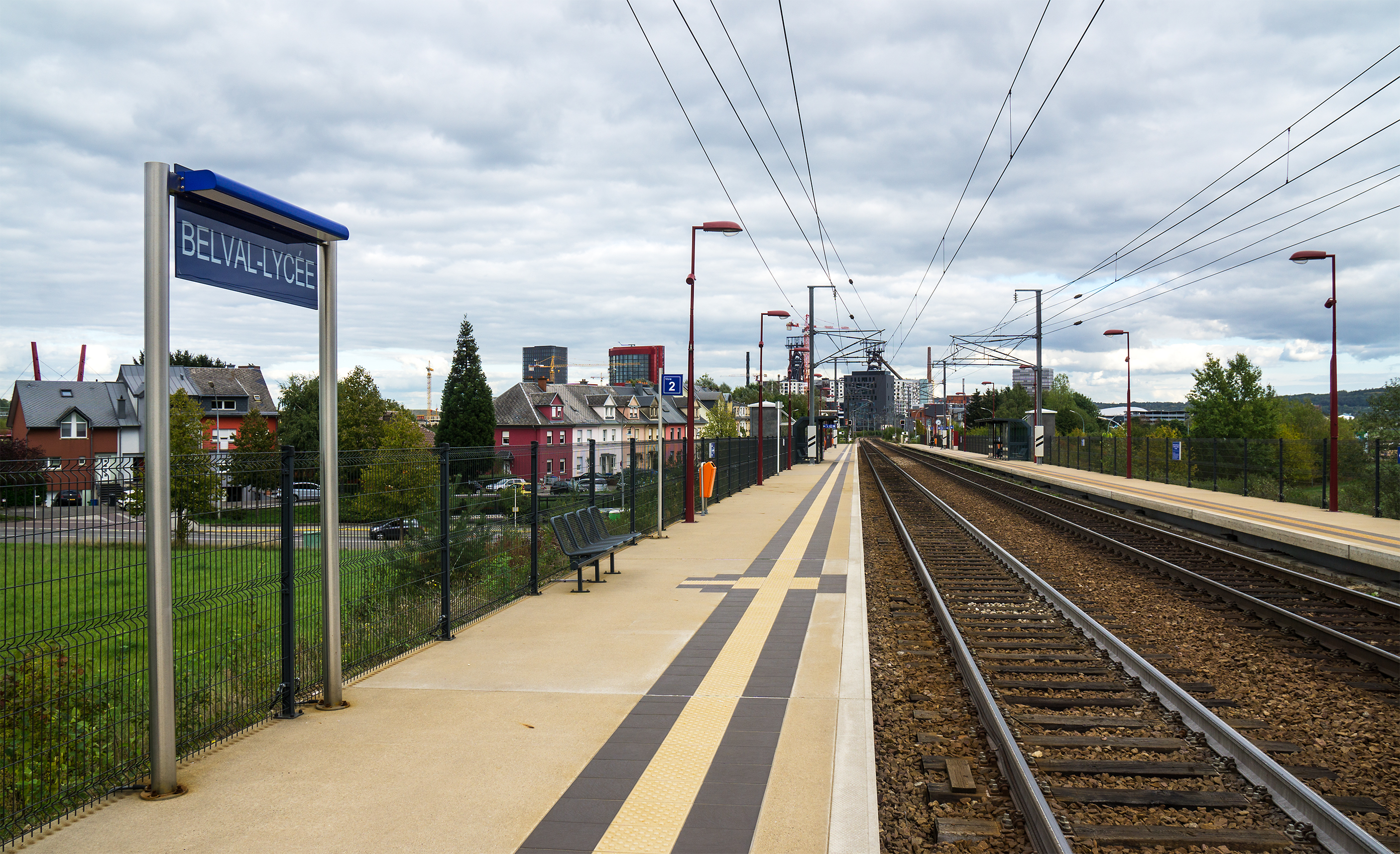
Belval-Lycée railway station

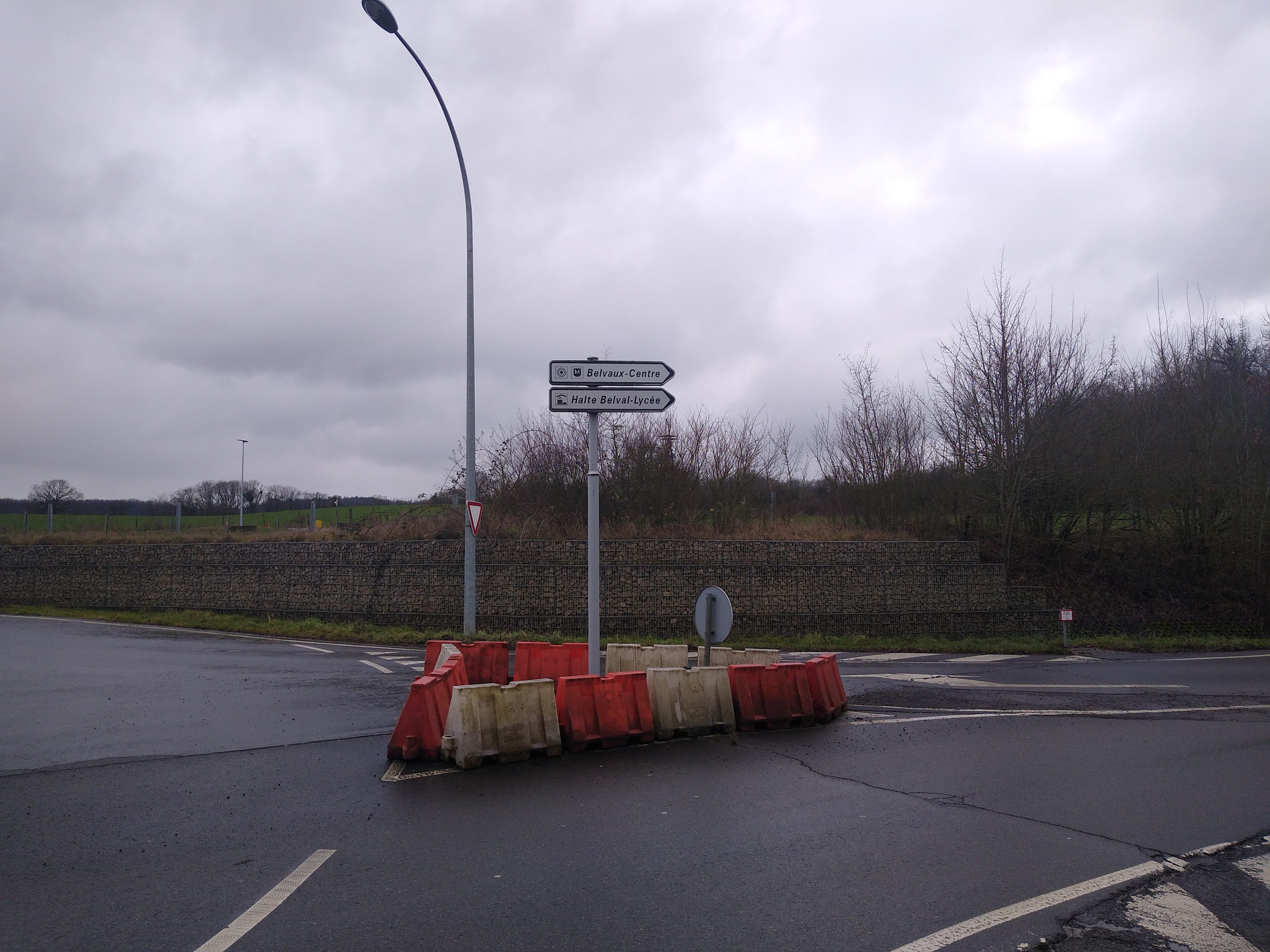
Signpost pointing to the bus stop near the station

Belval-Lycée railway station (French: Gare de Belval-Lycée) is a railway station serving the neighborhood of Belval, in the west of Esch-sur-Alzette, in southern Luxembourg. It opened on 29 September 2011. 'Lycée' refers to the school near the train station. The station is operated by CFL, the state-owned railway company.

The station is situated on Line 60, which connects Luxembourg City to the Red Lands of the south of the country.

The station also lies along a French-Luxembourgish hiking loop.

In 2017, Le Quotiden considered its recent addition, along with nearby Belval-Université, as partially to blame for increased CFL delays. By 2035, CFL expects to reduce the number of stations in the area by one.

Preceding station	CFL	Following station
Belval-Université towards Luxembourg	Line 60	Belval-Rédange towards Rodange
