= Belvaux-Soleuvre railway station =

Railway station in Sanem, Luxembourg

Coordinates: 49°30′45″N 05°55′43″E

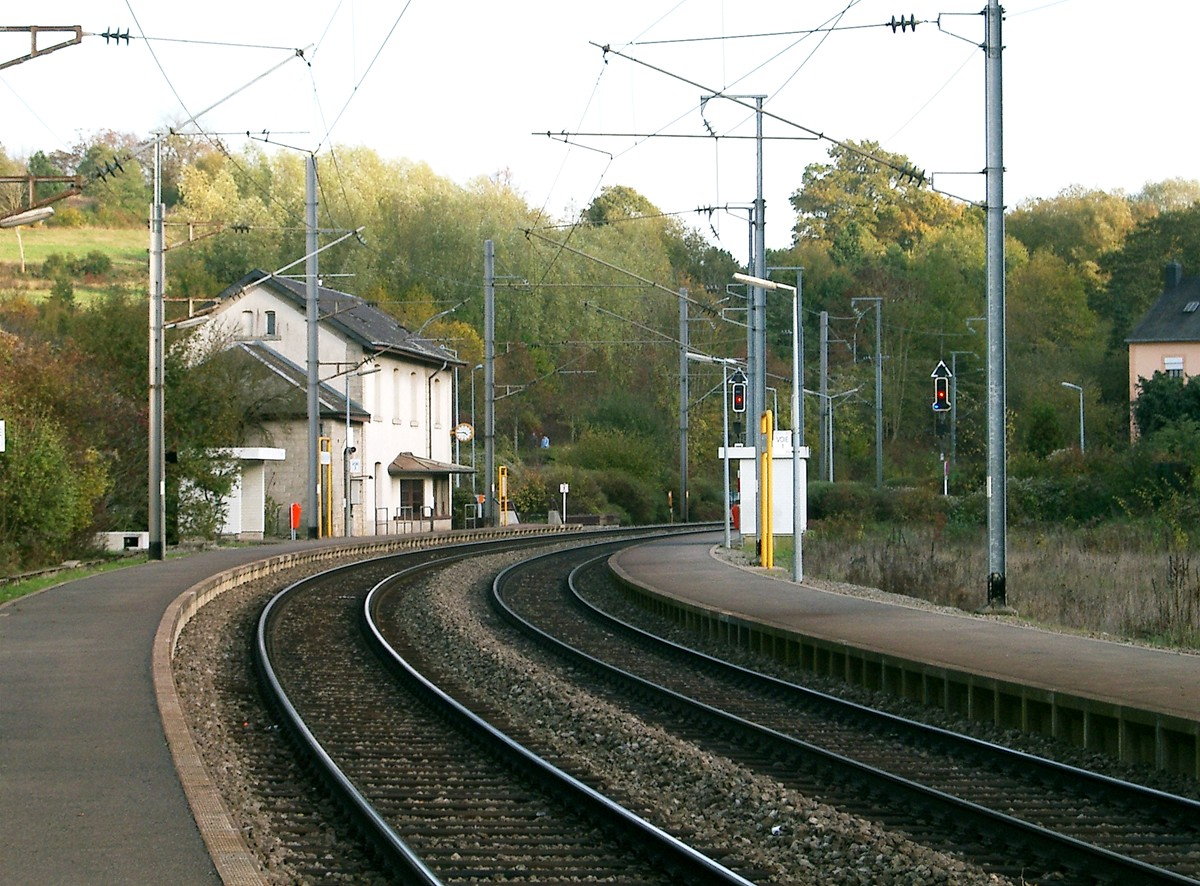
Belvaux-Soleuvre railway station

Belvaux-Soleuvre railway station (Luxembourgish: Gare Bieles-Zolwer, French: Gare de Belvaux-Soleuvre, German: Bahnhof Beles-Zolver) is a railway station serving the towns of Belvaux and Soleuvre, in the commune of Sanem, in south-western Luxembourg. The station is operated by Chemins de Fer Luxembourgeois, the state-owned railway company.

The station is situated on Line 60, which connects Luxembourg City to the Red Lands of the south of the country.

Preceding station	CFL	Following station
Belval-Rédange towards Luxembourg	Line 60	Oberkorn towards Rodange
