= Rudy Kugeler =

Luxembourgish fencer

Personal information
- Born: 11 August 1928 Differdange, Luxembourg
- Died: January 1992 (aged 63)

Sport
- Sport: Fencing

Achievements and titles
- Olympic finals: 1960 Summer Olympics

Rudy Kugeler (11 August 1928 – January 1992) was a Luxembourgish fencer. He competed in the team épée event at the 1960 Summer Olympics.
