= Niederkorn railway station =

Railway station in Differdange, Luxembourg

Coordinates: 49°32′06″N 05°53′35″E

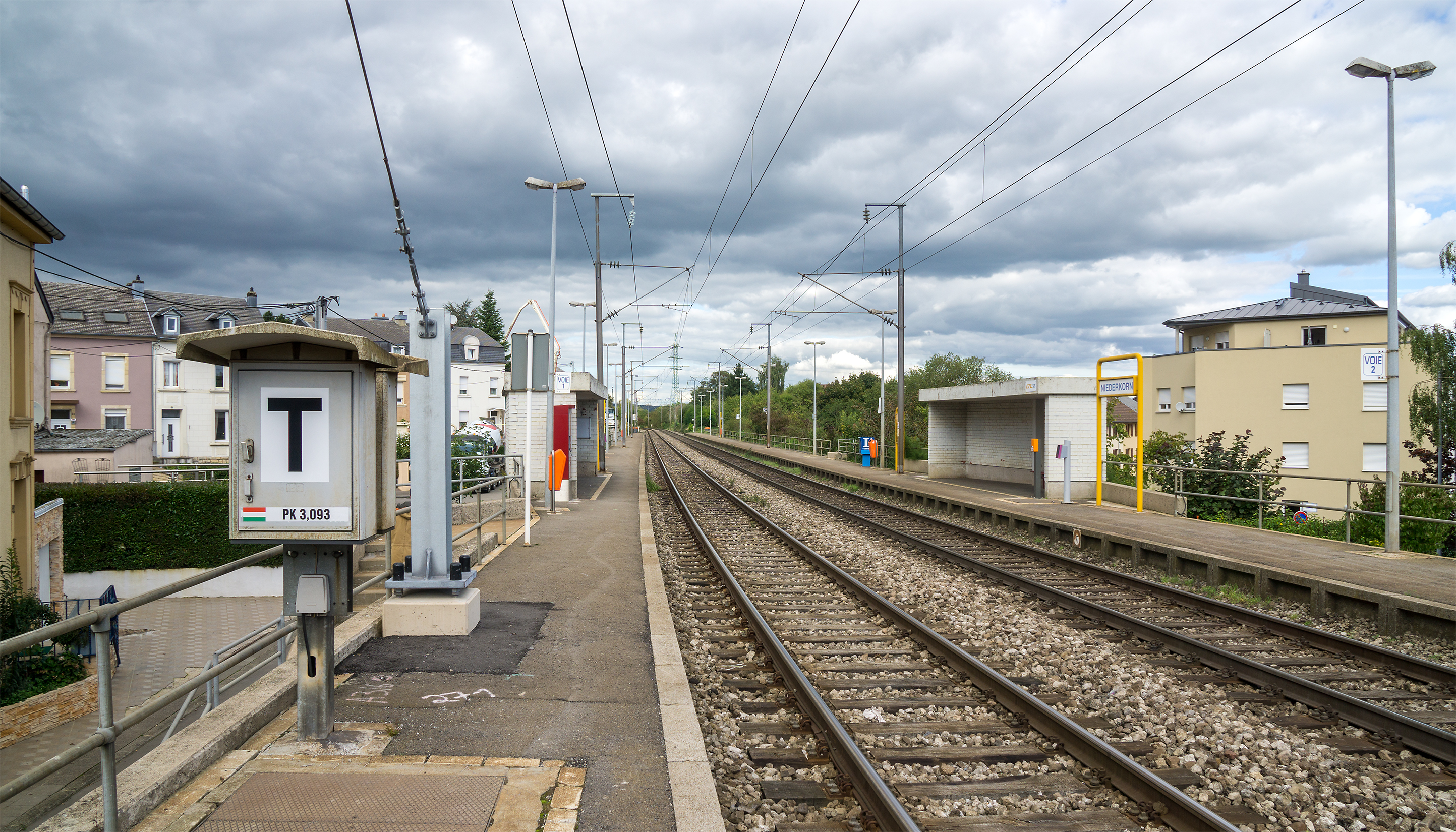
Niederkorn railway station

Niederkorn railway station (Luxembourgish: Gare Nidderkuer, French: Gare de Niederkorn, German: Bahnhof Niederkorn) is a railway station serving Niederkorn, in the commune of Differdange, in south-western Luxembourg. It is operated by Chemins de Fer Luxembourgeois, the state-owned railway company.

The station is situated on Line 60, which connects Luxembourg City to the Red Lands of the south of the country.

Preceding station	CFL	Following station
Differdange towards Luxembourg	Line 60	Pétange towards Rodange
