= Fiona Steil-Antoni =

Luxembourgian chess player (born 1989)

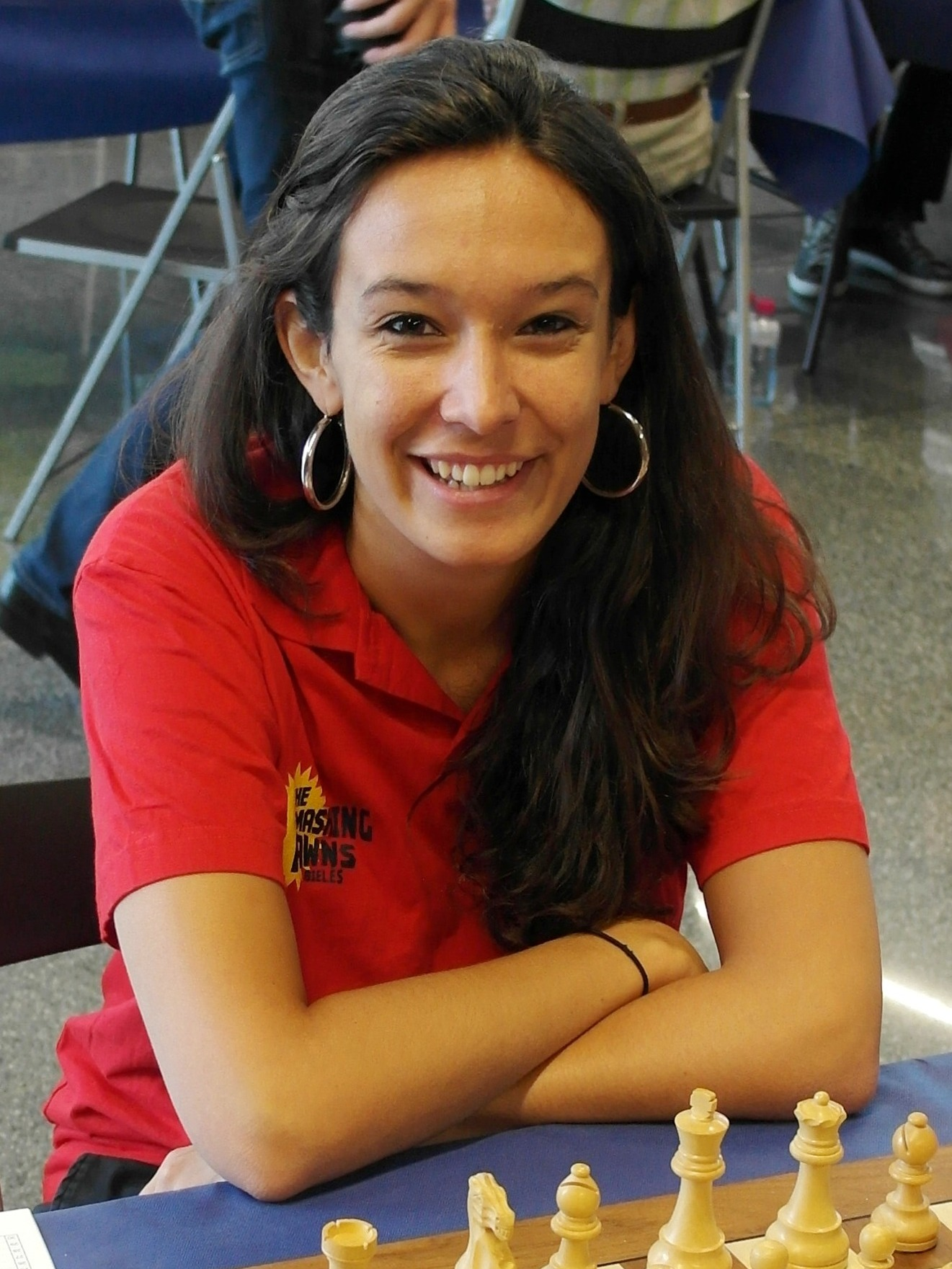
- Steil-Antoni at the 2014 European Club Cup in Bilbao

Personal information
- Born: 10 January 1989 (age 37) Niederkorn, Luxembourg

Chess career
- Country: Luxembourg
- Title: Woman International Master (2010)
- FIDE rating: 2182 (April 2023)
- Peak rating: 2218 (July 2022)

Fiona Steil-Antoni (born 10 January 1989) is a Luxembourgian chess player. She was awarded the title of Woman International Master by FIDE in 2010. Steil-Antoni won an individual gold medal at the Women's Chess Olympiad in 2006.

== Early life ==
Born in Niederkorn, Luxembourg, Steil-Antoni was taught to play chess by her father when she was nine years old. She made it onto the national team after one year and was trained by Vlastimil Jansa from then on.

== Chess career ==
Steil-Antoni has played for team Luxembourg in the 39th Chess Olympiad, the Women's Chess Olympiad, the 2011 European Team Chess Championship, and the European Small Nations Team Chess Championship. She was part of the team that won the bronze medal in the 2009 European Small Nations Team Chess Championship, held in Andorra la Vella. In 2006, at the Women's Chess Olympiad in Turin, she won the individual gold medal on board two thanks to a score of 10/12 points. She was awarded the Woman FIDE Master (WFM) title for this result.

Steil-Antoni tied for 2nd–3rd places with Pauline Guichard in the WGM tournament of the Condom Chess Festival in 2008, finishing second on tiebreak score. She was awarded the title of Woman International Master (WIM) by FIDE in April 2010. The norms required for the title were achieved in the 37th Chess Olympiad, the World Youth Chess Championships 2007, the Vandœuvre-lès-Nancy Open 2008, and the Condom WGM event 2008.

Steil-Antoni has won the Women's Luxembourg Chess Championship several times. She finished second in the Klaksvík Open 2010, the Uxbridge e2e4 Autumn Women's International in 2010, and the WIM tournament of the Mulhouse Chess Festival 2012.

She and Tom Weber won the Blitz Pairs tournament in Gibraltar 2011. This was the first time “The Smashing Pawns”, a club she founded together with some friends, was represented in any tournament. Steil-Antoni currently plays for The Smashing Pawns (Luxembourg), Vandoeuvre (France) and Cheddleton (England) clubs.

== Personal life ==
Steil-Antoni worked for Chess Evolution Weekly Newsletter and chess24.com. As of January 2022, she is working as a commentator for chess.com.
