= John E. Dolibois =

American diplomat

United States Ambassador to Luxembourg
- In office September 28, 1981 – September 17, 1985
- President: Ronald Reagan
- Preceded by: James Lowenstein
- Succeeded by: Jean Broward Shevlin Gerard

Personal details
- Born: Jean Ernst Dolibois; December 4, 1918 Luxembourg
- Died: May 2, 2014 (aged 95) Cincinnati, Ohio, U.S.
- Education: Miami University (BA)
- Occupation: Diplomat, college administrator

John Ernest Dolibois (né Jean Ernst Dolibois; December 4, 1918 – May 2, 2014) was an American diplomat and university administrator who served as the United States Ambassador to Luxembourg from 1981 to 1985. While serving in the U.S. military in World War II, he was also one of the two main translators, along with Howard Triest, for American psychiatrists during the Nuremberg trials.

== Early life ==
Dolibois was a native of Bonnevoie, Luxembourg. He emigrated to the United States with his father in 1931, settling in Akron, Ohio. He graduated from North High School in Akron and then attended Miami University, where he earned a bachelor's degree in psychology and was a member of Beta Theta Pi.

== Career ==
Dolibois served in the United States Army from 1942 to 1946, during World War II. He was a member of the so-called Ritchie Boys, a special military intelligence unit composed mainly of German, Austrian, and Czech refugees and immigrants to the United States. He taught German order of battle and Nazi Party hierarchy to army officers preparing for war and worked for the Supreme Headquarters Allied Expeditionary Force in France. After, Dolibois was sent to Mondorf-les-Bains in Luxembourg to interrogate the highest-ranking war criminals in the Nazi Party at Camp Ashcan. He was part of a team of five who questioned notable members of the party, including Hermann Göring and Julius Streicher, before the Nuremberg trials. At the trials, Dolibois acted as the interpreter for the prison psychiatrist and worked with the Nazi prisoners. He was promoted to captain in January 1946 and returned to the United States in May 1946.

After a brief career with Procter & Gamble, Dolibois returned to Miami University in 1947 as alumni secretary, eventually becoming vice president from 1967 until 1981. He was instrumental in the establishment of a Miami University campus in Luxembourg in 1968, which was renamed the Miami University Dolibois European Center after him in 1988. Dolibois was a frequent speaker to students and other audiences about his experiences during the Nuremberg trials.

U.S. President Ronald Reagan named Dolibois as United States Ambassador to Luxembourg on August 6, 1981. He was awarded the Order of the Oak Crown by Jean, Grand Duke of Luxembourg in 1987. In 1989, his autobiography, Pattern of Circles: An Ambassador's Story, was published by the Kent State University Press. Dolibois died on May 2, 2014, in Cincinnati, Ohio, at the age of 95.

== See also ==
- Camp Ashcan
- Miami University Dolibois European Center

== Sources ==
- El-Hai, Jack (2013). The Nazi and the Psychiatrist. New York: PublicAffairs.

Diplomatic posts
Preceded by James G. Lowenstein	United States Ambassador to Luxembourg; 1981–1985	Succeeded by Jean Broward Shevlin Gerard
