= Fernand Backes =

Luxembourgish boxer (born 1932)

Fernand Philippe Mathias Backes (born 30 January 1932) is a Luxembourgish former boxer. He was member of the Luxembourgish Olympic team at the 1952 Summer Olympics in Helsinki. After a bye in the first round of the light-welterweight division, he was eliminated in the second round by Belgian Jean-Louis Paternotte.

Backes was born in Differdange on 30 January 1932.

In 2008 he was promoted to the rank of Chevalier in the Order of Merit of the Grand Duchy of Luxembourg.
