= Belval, Luxembourg =

Human settlement in Luxembourg

Coordinates: 49°30′01″N 5°57′26″E

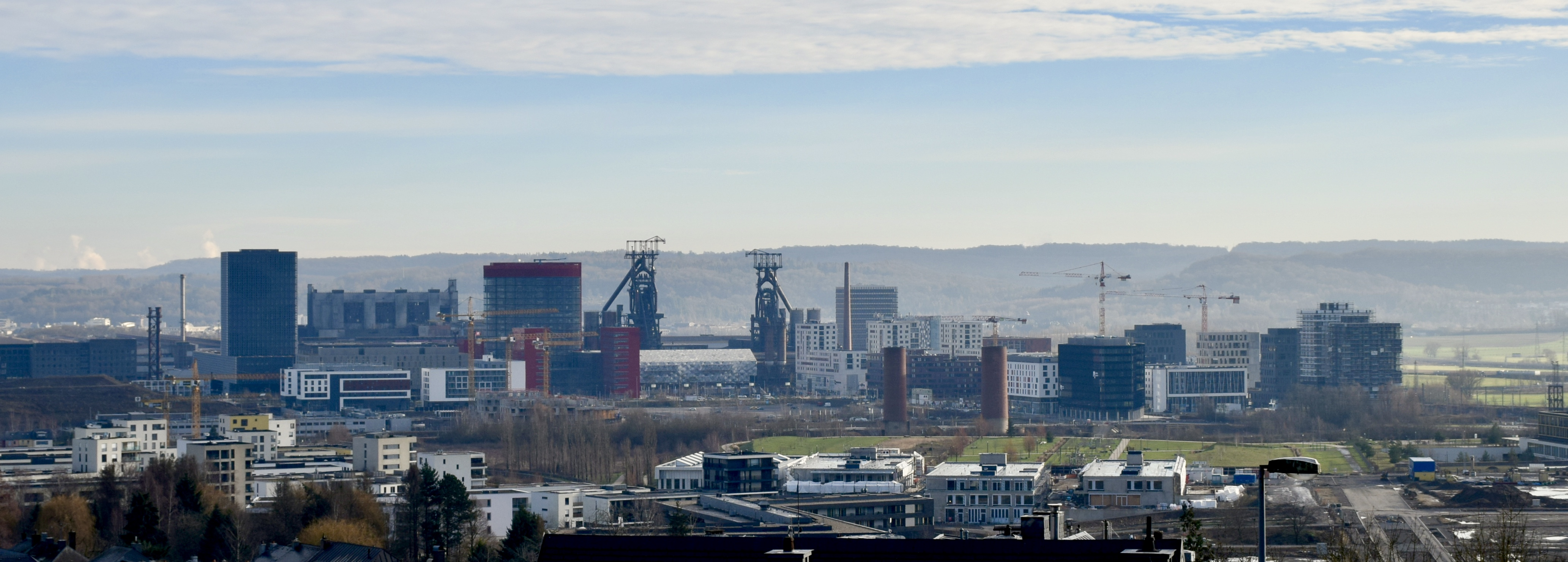
Panoramic picture of Belval in December 2019

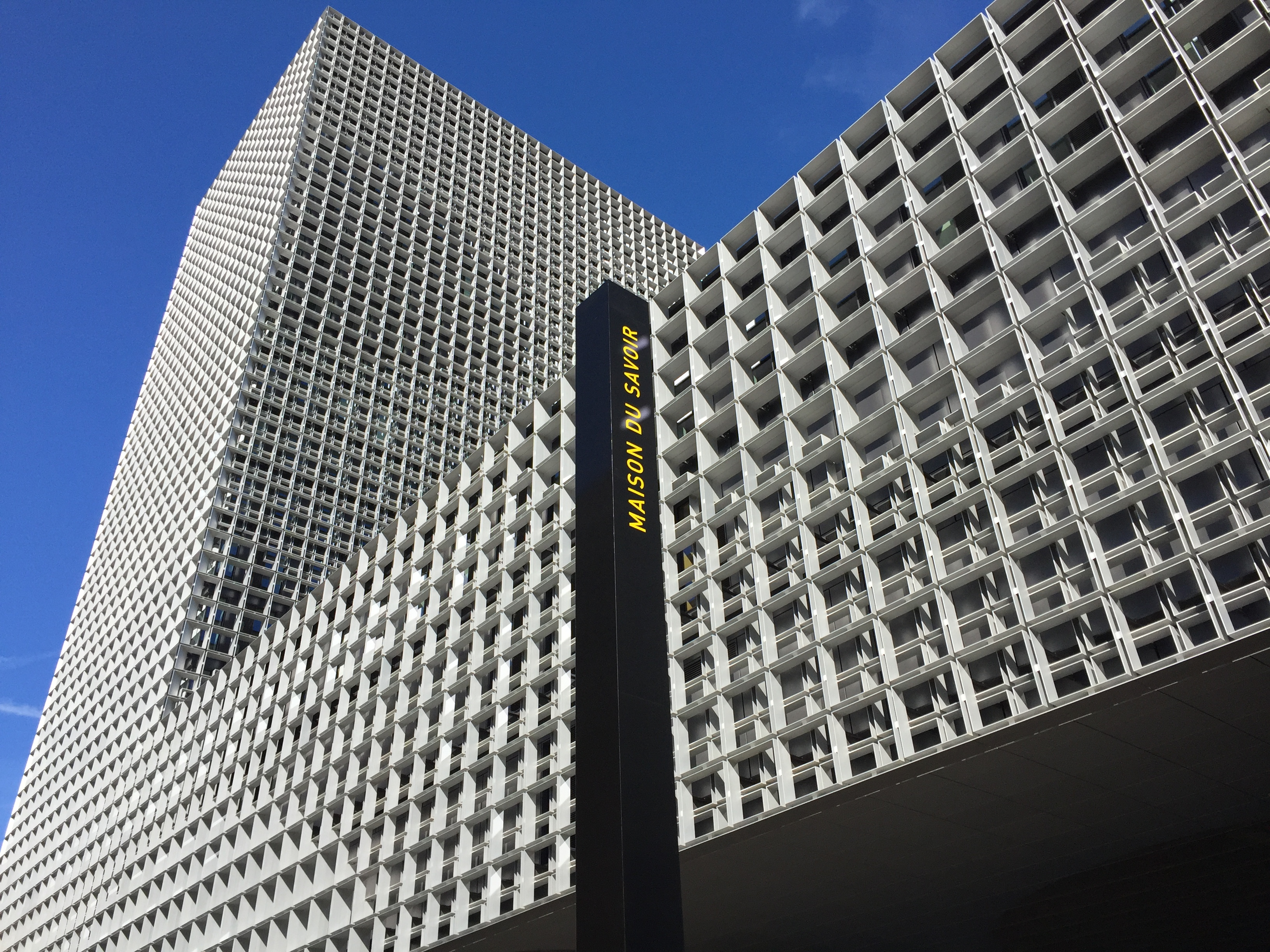
Maison du Savoir, University of Luxembourg

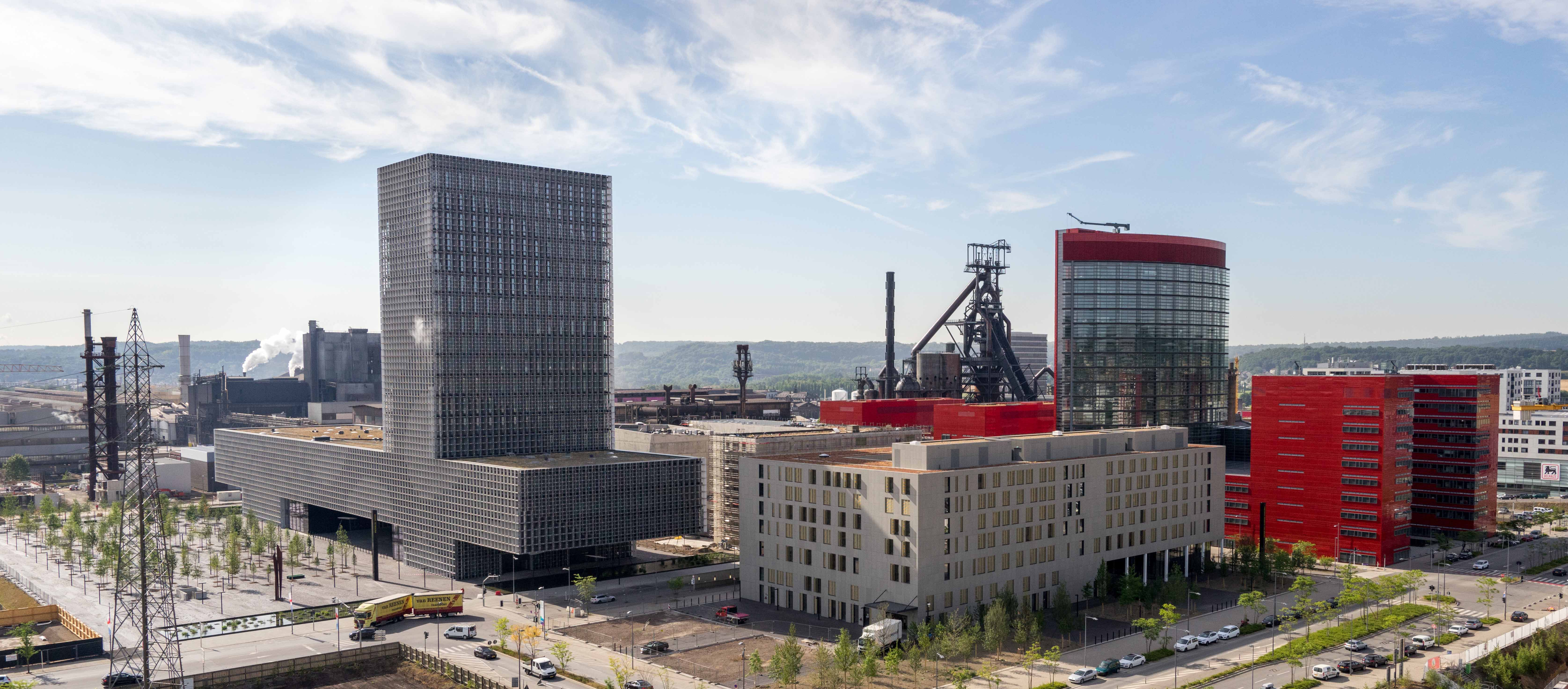
Belval campus

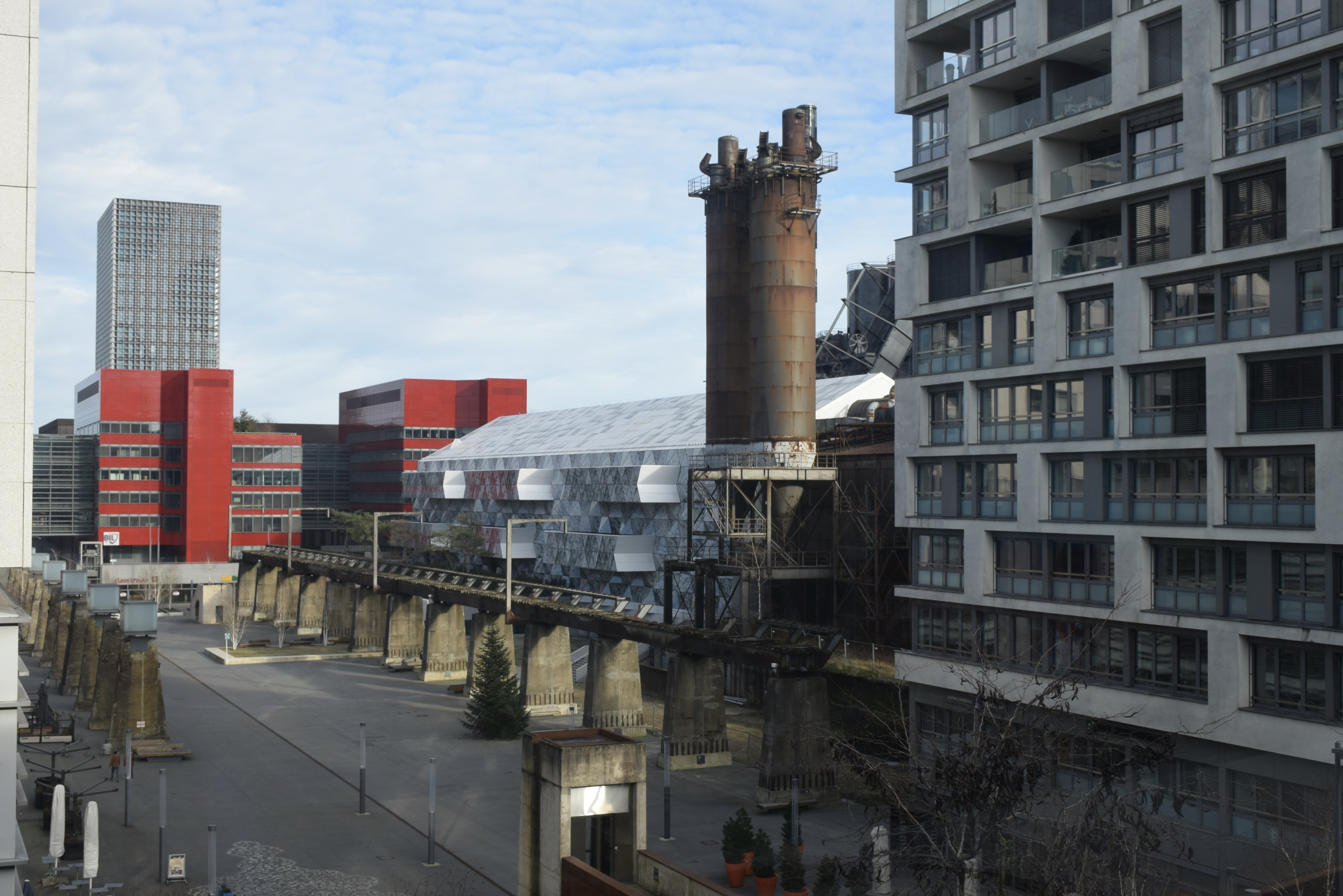
Place de l'Académie

Belval is a neighbourhood in the communes of Esch-sur-Alzette and Sanem, in south-western Luxembourg. Belval is the site of the large steelworks that dominate the city. Due to the dominance of the steelworks, Belval suffered from the abandonment of steel production in Luxembourg, and is undergoing an extensive regeneration programme to help diversify beyond steel production. The redevelopment plan, priced at €450m, will turn the brownfield site into a large scientific and cultural centre, including the science faculty of the University of Luxembourg. It is the location of the Rockhal, Luxembourg's largest music venue, which opened in 2005.

Belval is served by three railway stations operated by Chemins de Fer Luxembourgeois: Belval-Université, Belval-Rédange, and Belval-Lycée.

== Site history ==
=== The steel era ===
Between 1909 and 1912, the company Gelsenkirchener Bergwerks A.G. built a brand new steelworks at Esch-sur-Alzette: the factory Adolf-Emil.

In 1911, the company ARBED (Aciéries Réunies de Burbach-Eich-Dudelange) was created by the merger and acquisition of the 3 largest steelworks in Luxembourg. The steel industry in those years was prosperous as 1913 was a year with one of the highest yields.

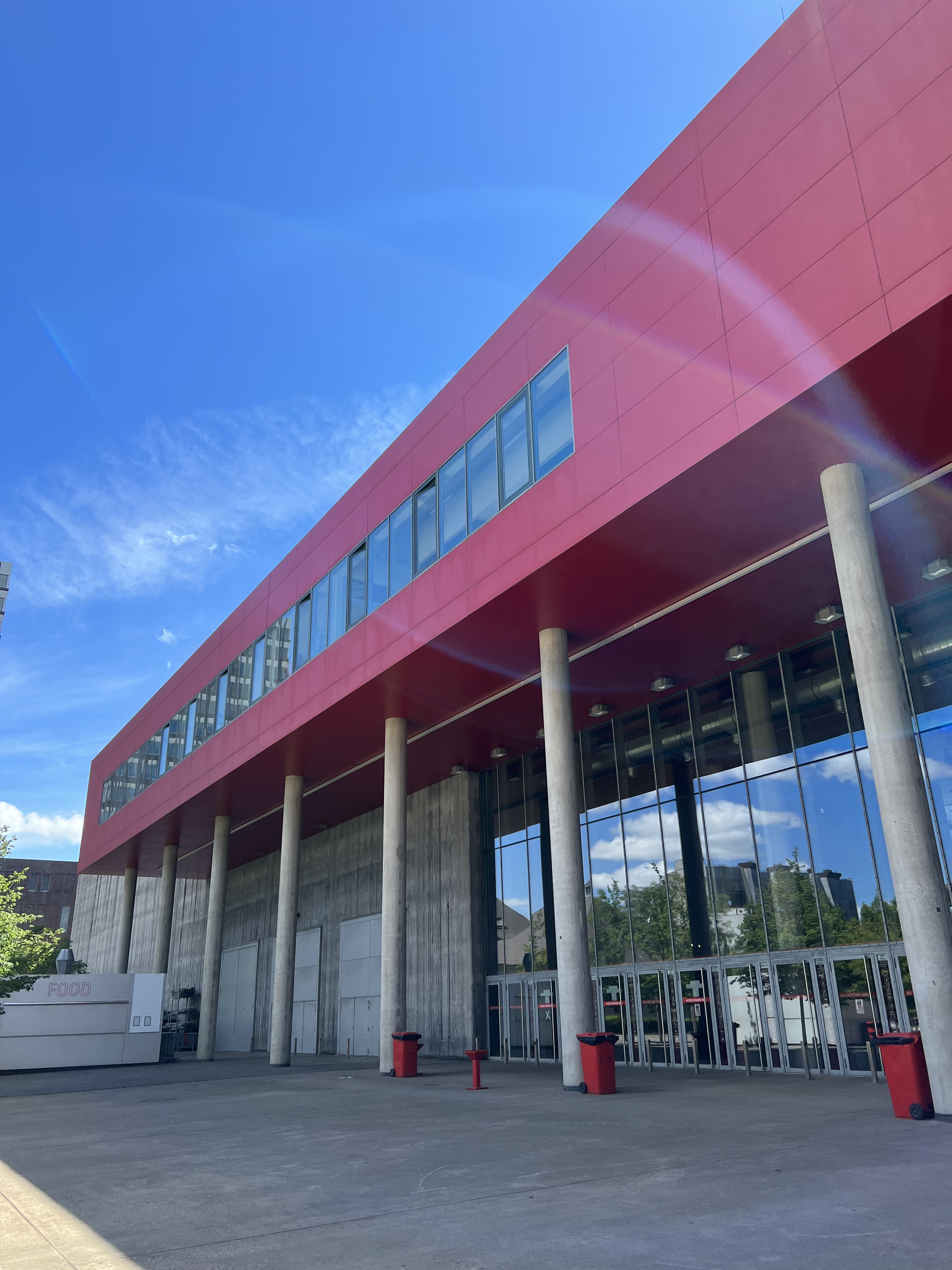
Rockhal concert hall in Belval

Unfortunately, the steel and coal production saw a decline in its production after World War II. Indeed, the Luxembourgish production was highly linked to the German market and the German machinery. Both of them were impacted by the war and therefore the Luxembourgish industry also got impacted.

However, it obtained a certain revival in 1950. The following years were much more prosperous partly thanks to the European Coal and Steel Community (ECSC). Indeed, the ECSC was founded in 1952, and it is after many negotiations that it was decided, during the night from the 24th to the 25th of July, that the European Coal and Steel Community's High Authority would temporarily begin its work in Luxembourg. Luxembourg, therefore, became the centre of this economic community and became the centre of the coal and steel production. As a symbol of this, on 30 April 1953, on the eve of the opening of the common European steel market, Jean Monnet, President of the High Authority of the ECSC, activated the first European steel casting at the Belval steelworks.

The steel industry continued to prosper for a few more years, in 1965 began the firing of blast furnace A (daily capacity: 2300t; diameter: 8 m). In 1970 was the Firing of blast furnace B at ARBED Esch-Belval (daily capacity: 3000 t; diameter: 9 m) where automation was very advanced and would enable full computer control in the near future. And finally, 1979 was the year where Blast furnace C came to life.

In 1994, ARBED decided to change its type of steel production for long products (such as sheet piling) at its sites in Luxembourg. The steel production moved from produced from iron ore with blast furnaces to electric arc furnaces using recycled steel.

But those prosperous years were not to continue. As every steel and coal production from the region, Belval suffered from the economical context. In 1995, furnace C got shut down after a breakdown and never reopened. It was disassembled in 1996. Soon following it was furnace A which closed in 1995. With the closing of the last blast furnace in Esch-Belval in July 1997, 120 hectares (approximatively 300 acres) were available for a redevelopment process, offering a place with a high economic development for the country and the whole southern region.

=== The Belval project ===
In 2001, an international urban planning contest was set up to take the best decisions about the Belval project.

After a detailed study of the projects, focused on the profitability, duration and site preparation criteria, a dialogue committee, supervised by the Ministry of the Interior, decided on 8 March 2002 to pursue the planning on the basis of the project from the Jo Coenen & Co architects and urbanists of Maastricht.

Across the different districts, the project will be able to accommodate more than 5,000 inhabitants and more than 20,000 daily users. The new urban setting extends over a developed surface of almost 1.3 million m^{2}, on 69 hectares for building. An important proportion (30 percent of the surfaces) is saved for green and public spaces.

The conditions of its implementation confers great development potential on it thanks to:

- the respect of the guiding principles formulated since the beginning by the project originators;
- the creation of a harmonious urban fabric with the municipalities of Esch-sur-Alzette and Sanem;
- an active support of the State through an important decentralization programme of administrative and other governmental functions including the implementation of an ambitious secondary and higher education policy. This policy was developed in relation to creation of the University of Luxembourg and to the high school of Belval, Lycée Bel-Val.
