= Zolwerknapp =

Coordinates: 49.52646°N 5.93682°E

Zolwerknapp (German: Zolver Knapp) is a hill in the commune of Sanem, in south-western Luxembourg. It is 422 metres (1,385 ft) tall, and lies just to the north-west of Soleuvre (Zolwer in Luxembourgish and German, hence the name of the hill).
