= Stade Municipal (Oberkorn) =

Football stadium in Oberkorn, Luxembourg

Coordinates: 49.5146°N 5.8899°E

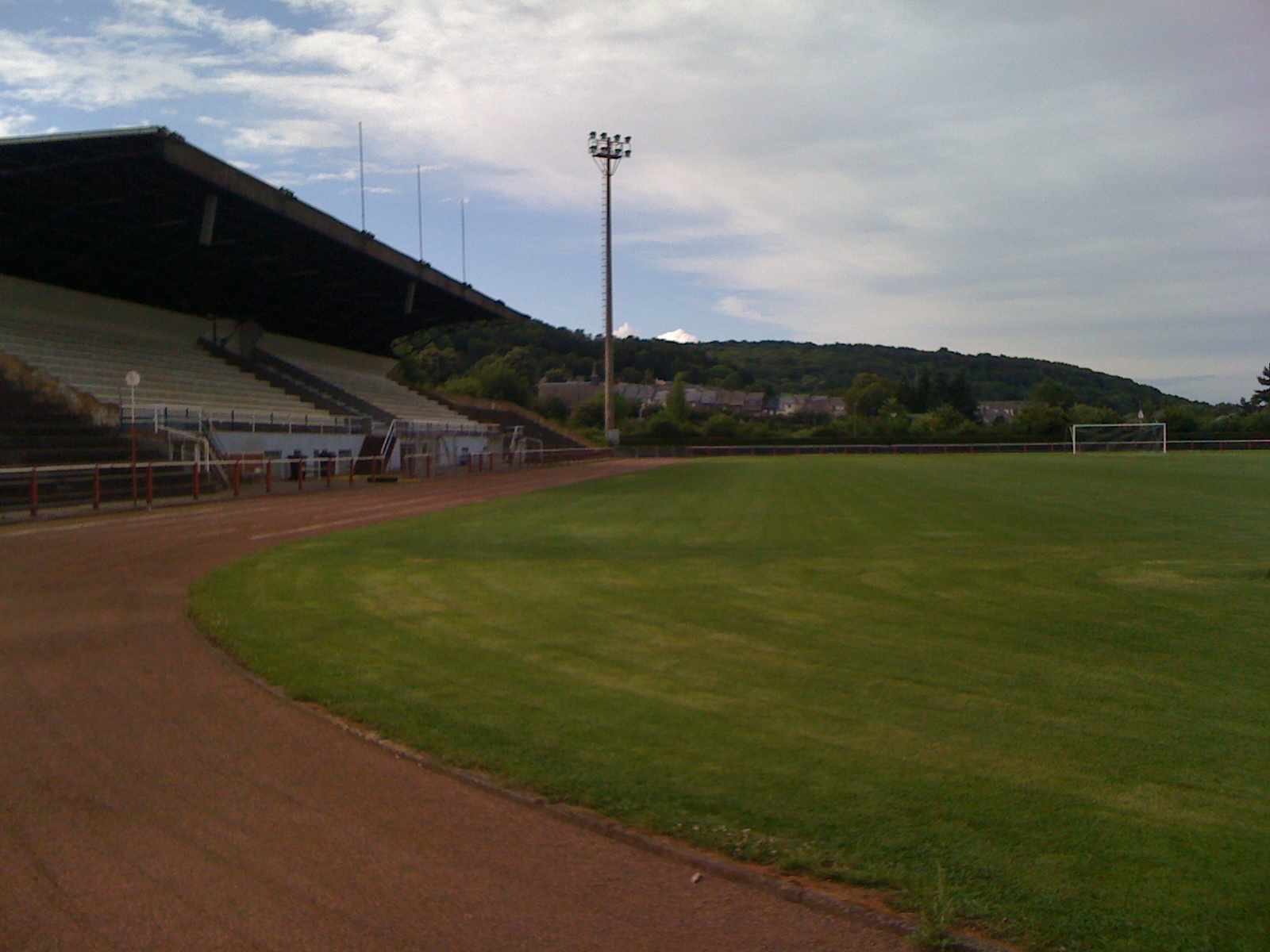
- Interactive map of Stade Municipal
- Full name: Stade Municipal
- Location: Oberkorn, Luxembourg
- Capacity: 10,000
- Surface: Grass

Tenant
- CS Oberkorn

Stade Municipal is a stadium in Oberkorn, Luxembourg. It has a capacity of 10,000 spectators. It is the home of CS Oberkorn.
