= Miami University Dolibois European Center =

Campus of Miami University in Differdange, Luxembourg

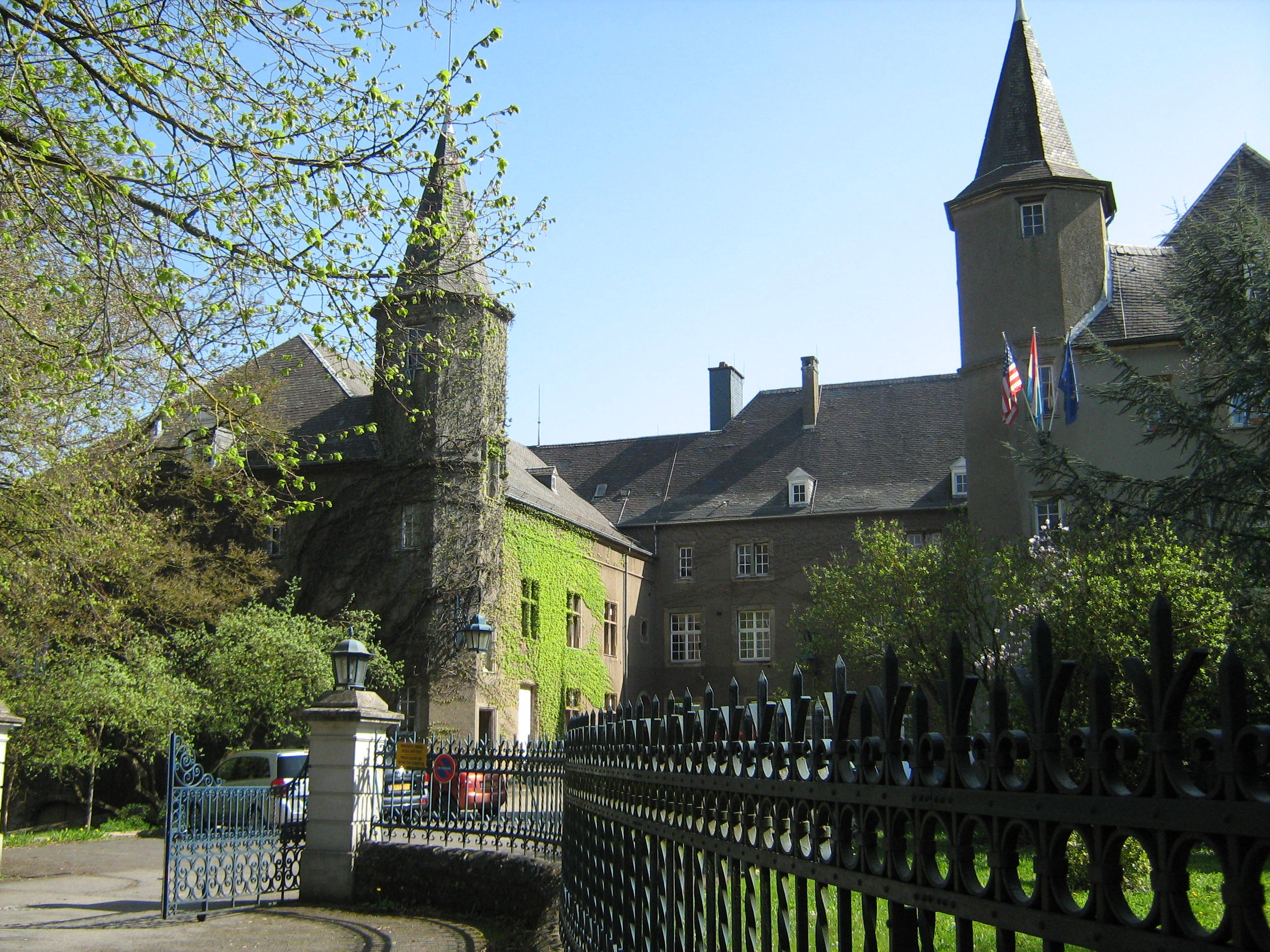
- Differdange Castle
- Other name: MUDEC
- Former name: Miami University European Center
- Type: International branch campus
- Established: 1968; 58 years ago
- Parent institution: Miami University
- Director: Stephanie Shaheen
- Location: Differdange, L-4524, Luxembourg; 49.5214°N 5.8891°E
- Colors: Red and white
- Website: miamioh.edu/global-initiatives/miami-in-luxembourg/

The Miami University John E. Dolibois European Center (MUDEC) is an international branch campus of Miami University in Differdange, Luxembourg. Established in 1968, the program is based in Differdange Castle and enrolls around 125 students each semester from Miami and other American universities. The center is named after John E. Dolibois, a native Luxembourger who was a Miami University graduate and administrator as well as the United States Ambassador to Luxembourg from 1981 to 1985.

== History ==
Charles Ray Wilson, university provost, conceived the project of an international campus in the 1960s. Sites for the campus were initially considered in Austria, France, Japan, Luxembourg, and Switzerland. President Phillip Shriver appointed a committee of faculty and administrators to evaluate potential locations for a European site in regions along the French-German cultural and linguistic border.

John E. Dolibois, who at the time was the university's Vice President for Development and Alumni Affairs, was the first to suggest his native country of Luxembourg and was instrumental in establishing the campus. The campus first opened in 1968 as the Miami University European Center in Luxembourg City. It was renamed after Dolibois in 1988.

In 1997, MUDEC moved to southern Luxembourg with the purchase of Differdange Castle in Differdange. The campus reached the milestone of 10,000 students enrolled cumulatively in the program in 2012.

Since the campus opened, Miami University has awarded honorary degrees to members of the reigning House of Luxembourg-Nassau, including Grand Duke Jean in 1979, Grand Duke Henri in 2017, and Prince Guillaume in 2018.

== Academics ==
MUDEC offers continuing classes pertaining to students' studies at the main Miami University campus, typically in architecture, business, French, German, history, and political science. Apart from language courses, all courses are taught in English. Students live in homestays with Luxembourgish host families, and are encouraged to travel throughout Europe over weekends as well as through university-led study programs.

== See also ==
- Sacred Heart University Luxembourg
