= Oberkorn railway station =

Railway station in Luxembourg

Coordinates: 49°30′35″N 05°53′34″E

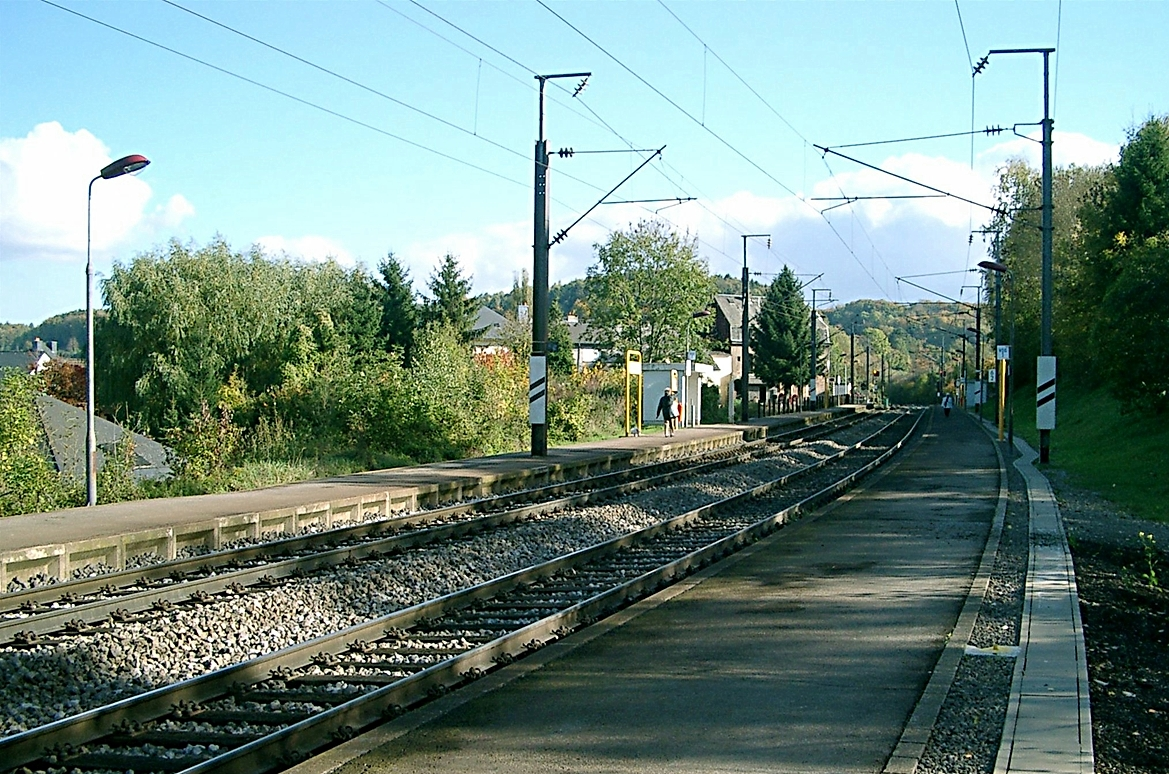
Oberkorn railway station

Oberkorn railway station (Luxembourgish: Gare Uewerkuer, French: Gare d'Oberkorn, German: Bahnhof Korn) is a railway station serving Oberkorn, in south-western Luxembourg. It is operated by CFL, the state-owned railway company.

The station is situated on Line 60, which connects Luxembourg City to the Red Lands (Minett) region in the south-west of Luxembourg.

Preceding station	CFL	Following station
Belvaux-Soleuvre towards Luxembourg	Line 60	Differdange towards Rodange
