= Belval-Rédange railway station =

Railway station in Luxembourg

Coordinates: 49.5032°N 5.9237°E

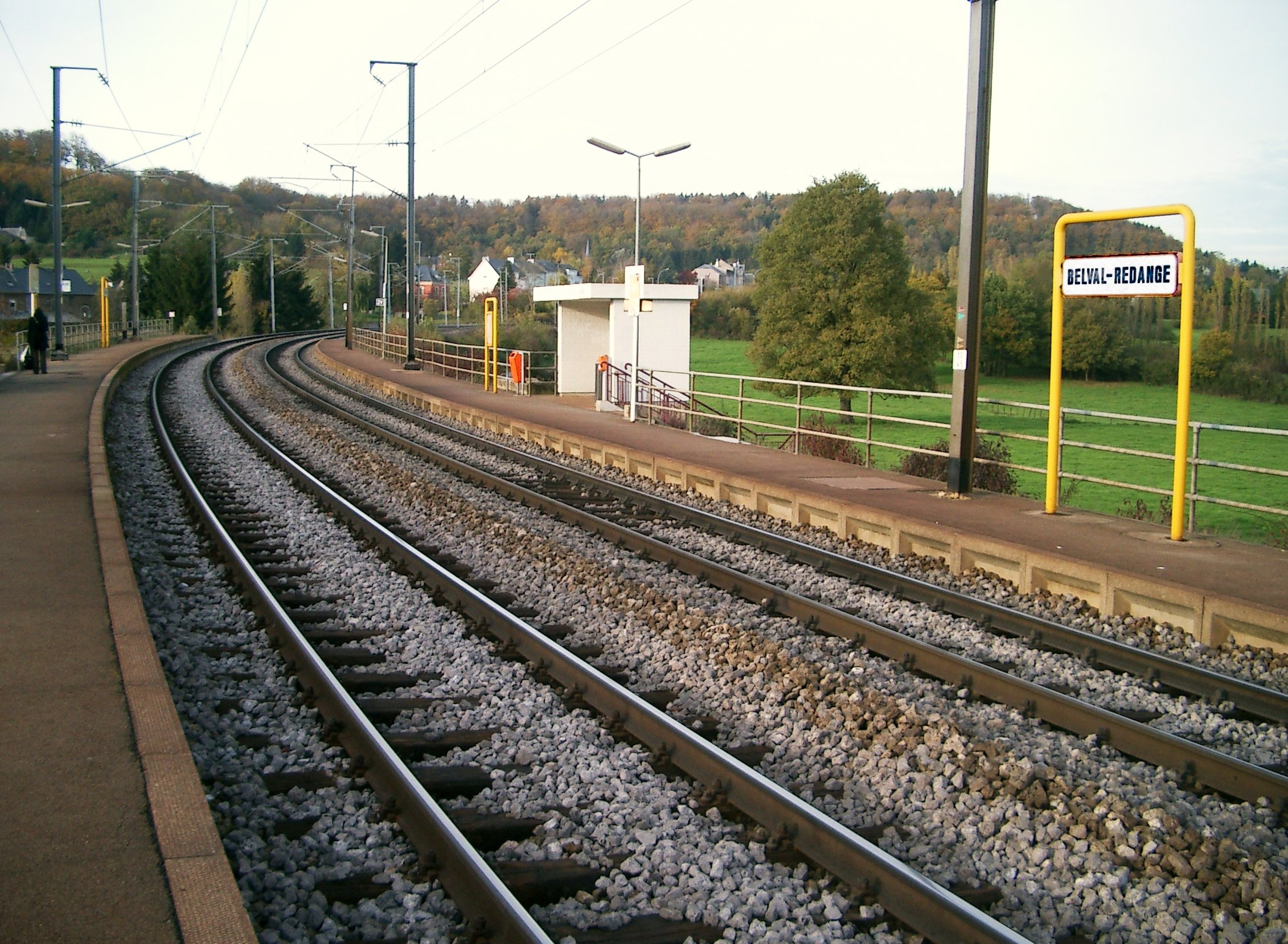
Belval-Rédange railway station

Belval-Rédange railway station (Luxembourgish: Gare Belval-Réideng, French: Gare de Belval-Rédange, German: Bahnhof Belval-Redingen) is a railway station serving the neighbourhood of Belval, in the west of Esch-sur-Alzette, in southern Luxembourg. The 'Rédange' in the name is a reference to the French town of Rédange, which lies just across the border. The station is operated by Chemins de Fer Luxembourgeois, the state-owned railway company.

The station is situated on Line 60, which connects Luxembourg City to the Red Lands of the south of the country.

Preceding station	CFL	Following station
Belval-Lycée towards Luxembourg	Line 60	Belvaux-Soleuvre towards Rodange
