= Differdange railway station =

Railway station in Differdange, Luxembourg

Coordinates: 49°31′12″N 05°53′26″E

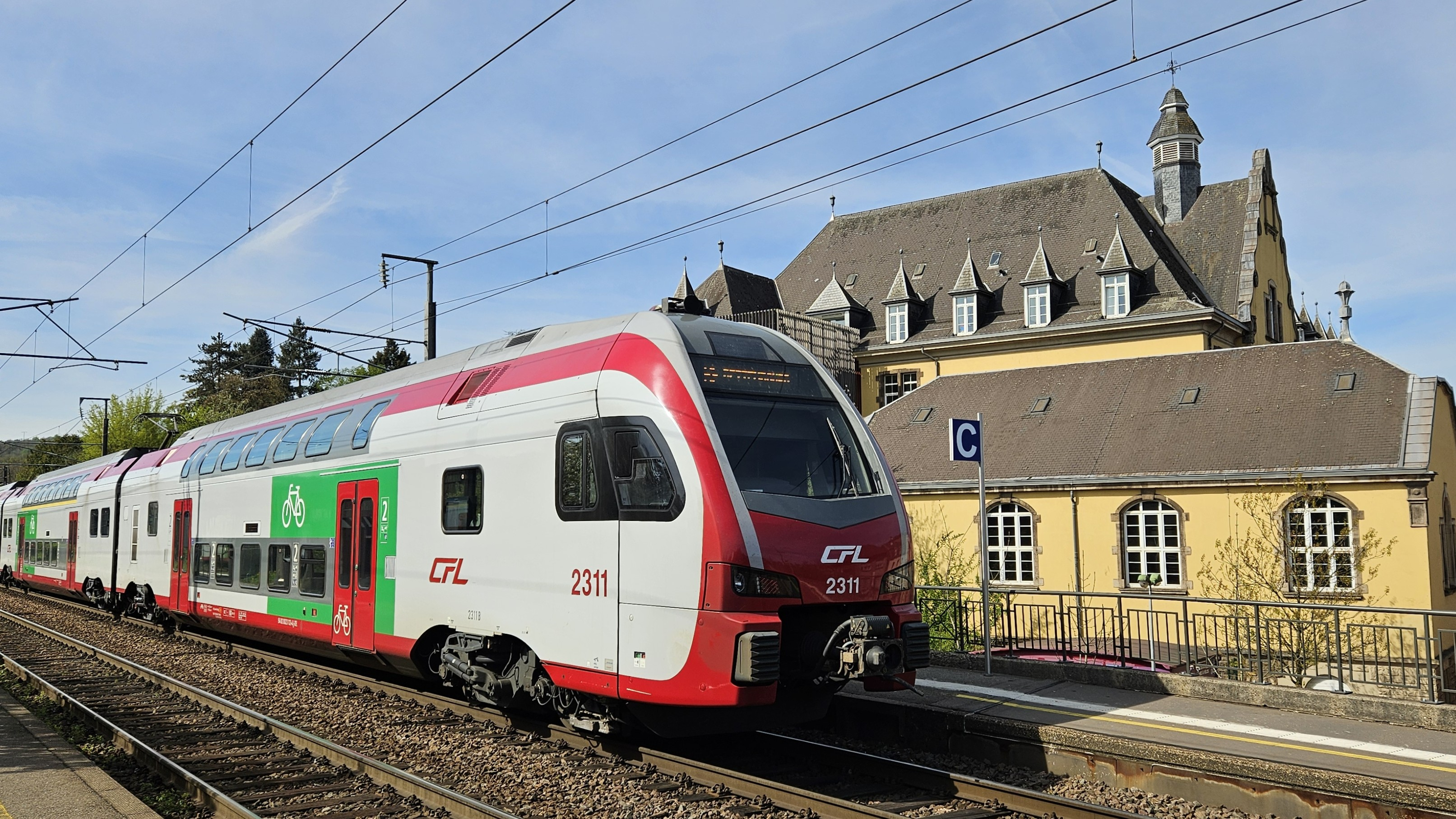
Differdange railway station

Differdange railway station (Luxembourgish: Gare Déifferdeng, French: Gare de Differdange, German: Bahnhof Differdingen) is a railway station serving Differdange, in south-western Luxembourg. It is operated by CFL, the state-owned railway company.

The station is situated on Line 60, which connects Luxembourg City to the Red Lands (Minett) region.

The station has 2 platforms and serves the RB (Regional Bull) and RE (Regional Express) variants of the Line 60. When the service is disrupted, it is substituted by a bus, L60, which stops at the bus stop Differdange, Opkorn next to the railway station. In late 2024, the railway station underwent maintenance which added analog clocks, a new station sign, and 2 container waiting rooms.

Preceding station	CFL	Following station
Oberkorn towards Luxembourg	Line 60	Niederkorn towards Rodange
