= Oberkorn =

Town in the commune of Differdange in Luxembourg

Coordinates: 49°31′N 5°54′E

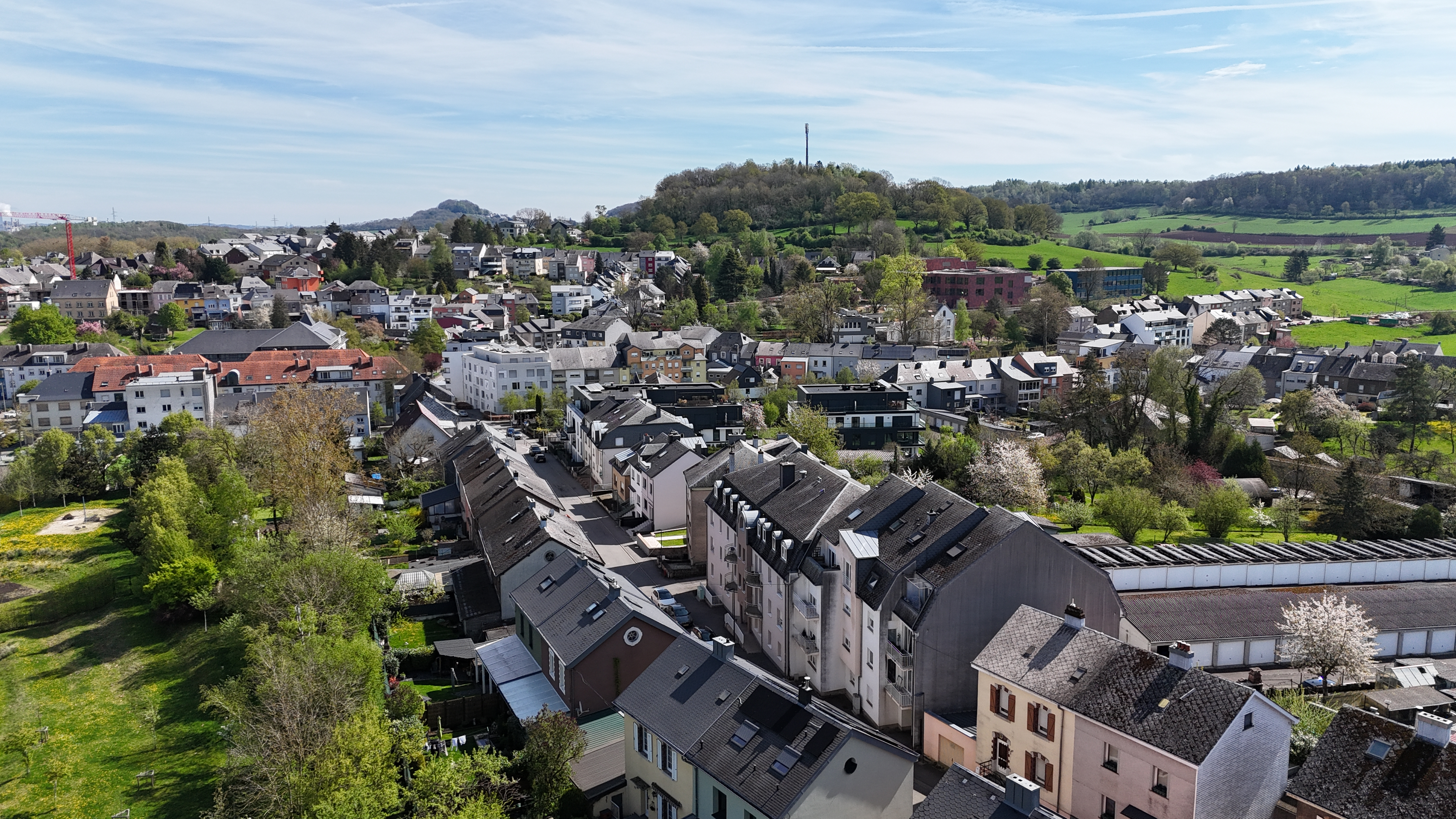
View of Oberkorn

Oberkorn ([ˈoːbɐkɔʁn]; Luxembourgish: Uewerkuer [ˈuəvɐkuːɐ̯]; both lit. 'Upper Korn/Kuer', in contrast to "Lower Korn/Kuer") is a town in the commune of Differdange in south-western Luxembourg. As of September 2026, the town had a population of 4,860.

== Etymology ==
Both the towns of Oberkorn and Niederkorn get their names from the river D'Kuer (also called as Kar, Kor or Korn) in Luxembourgish or the Chiers in English and French or Korn in German. The river Chiers is a right tributary of the Meuse. The source of the Chiers is near Oberkorn. The Chiers flows roughly in western direction, and crosses the border with Belgium and flows through Athus (province of Luxembourg).

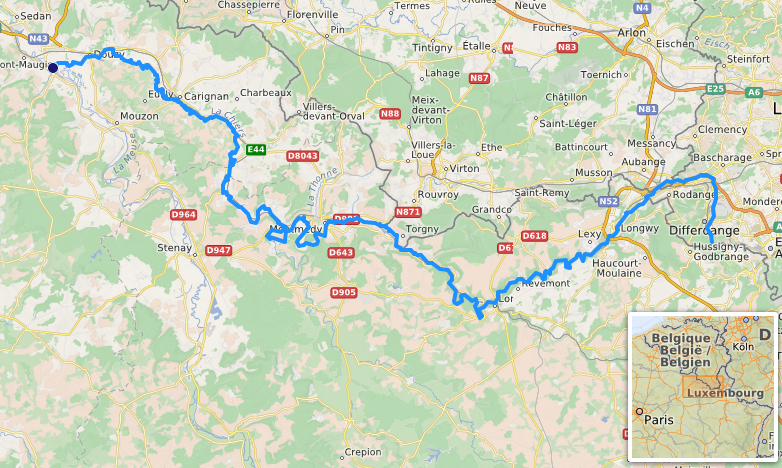
The drainage of river Chiers.

== Administration ==
The administration of this town falls under the commune of Differdange together with other towns Niederkorn, Lasauvage, Differdange-Fousbann.

== Education ==
Oberkorn has couple of primary schools Ecole Prince Henri and Um bok.

Lunex University, located in Oberkorn, offers graduate and specialist programs in physiotherapy, sport and exercise science, and sport management.

== Sports ==
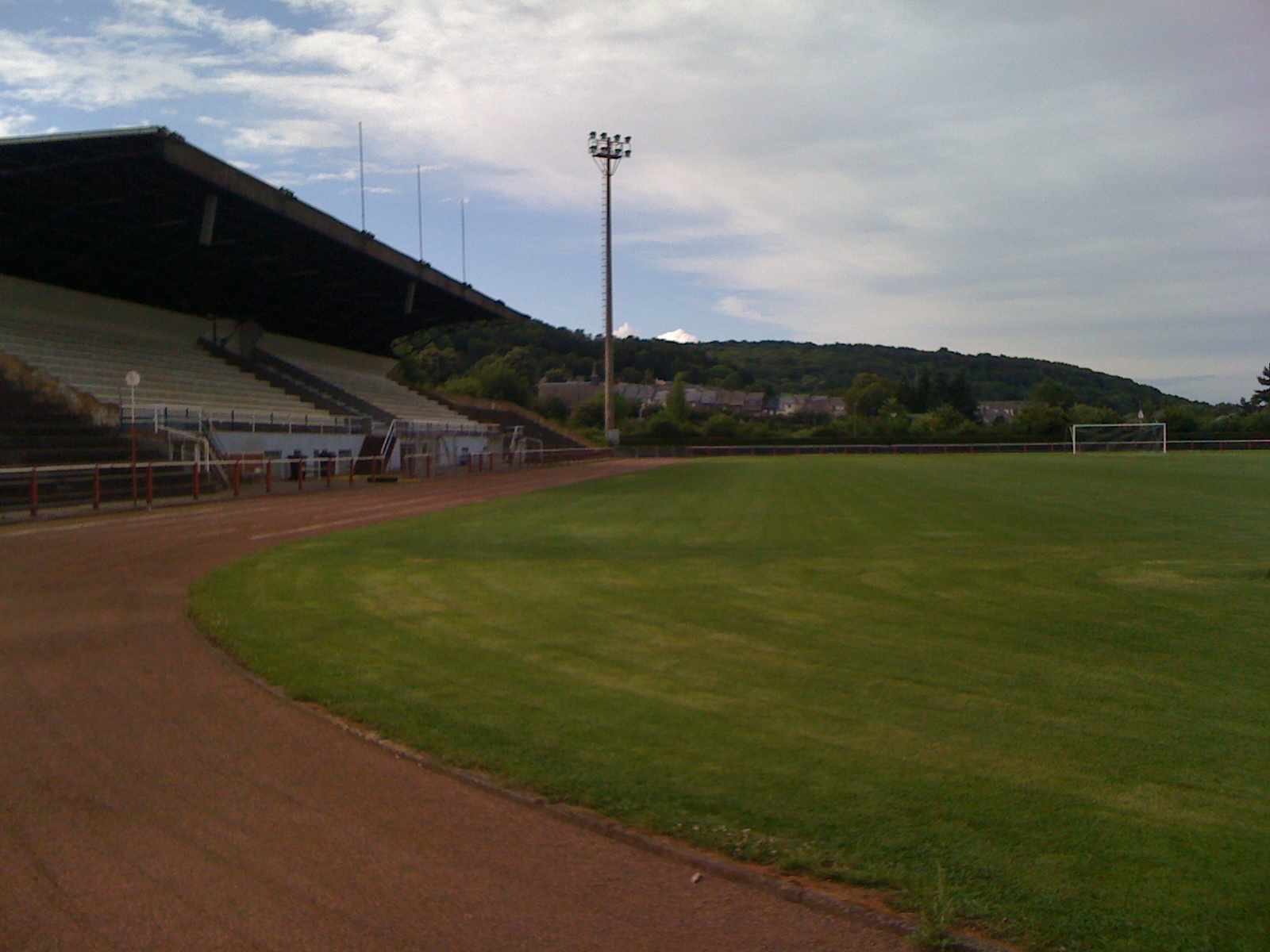
Stade Municipal

FC Differdange 03's home stadium is located in Oberkorn. That apart the two football clubs CS Oberkorn and FC Luna Oberkorn also play in that locality.

Oberkorn also has an outdoor and indoor swimming pool with training and coaching facilities at Aquasud.

Sports centre Parc des Sports is Differdange commune's sport complex offering martial arts, boxing and handball.

There is also an athletic field Stade Jaminet in this town.
