= Belval-Université railway station =

Railway station in Esch-sur-Alzette, Luxembourg

Coordinates: 49°29′42″N 05°58′07″E

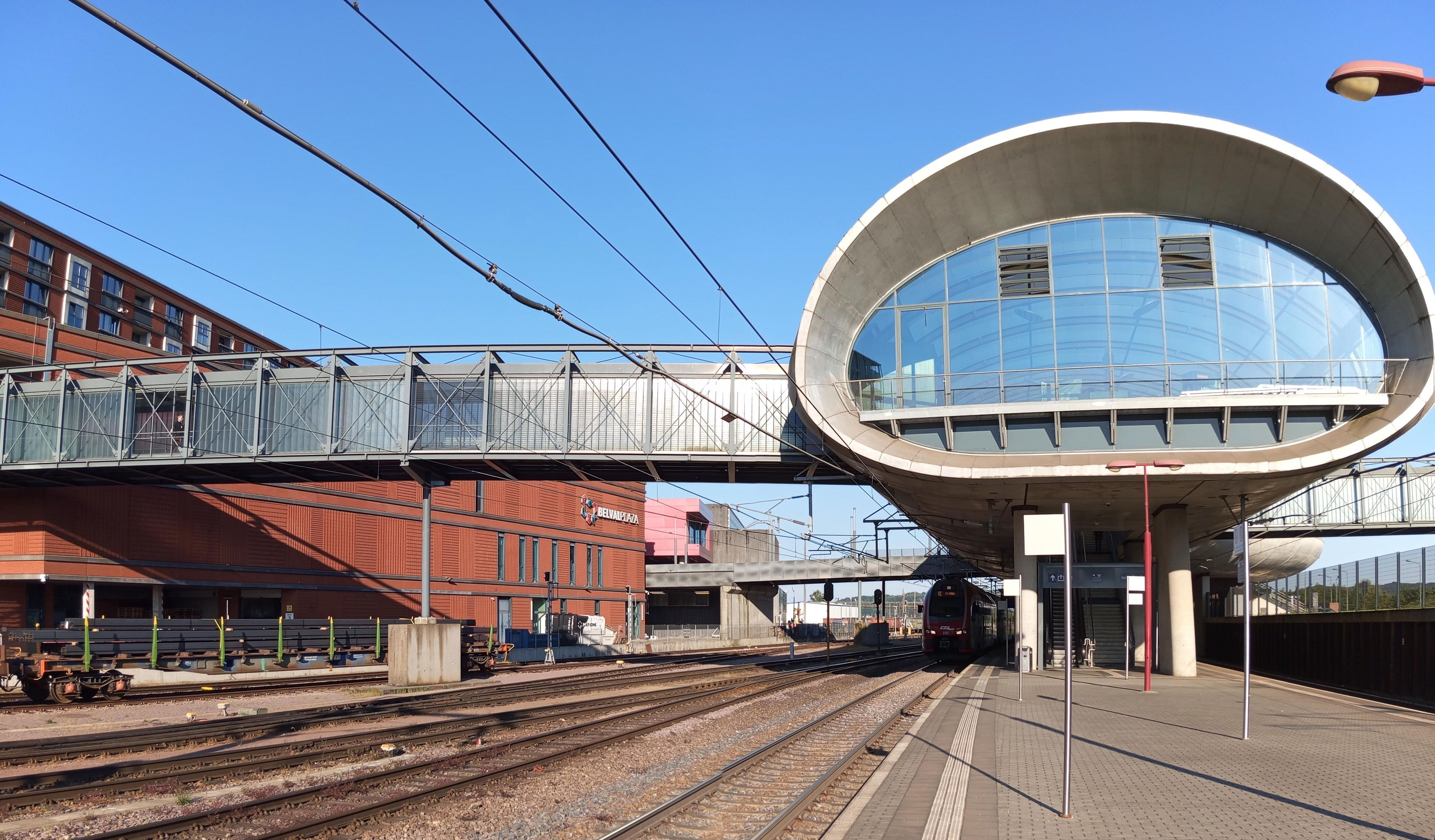
Belval-University station (2024)

Belval-Université railway station (Luxembourgish: Gare Belval-Universitéit, French: Gare de Belval-Université) is a railway station serving the neighbourhood of Belval, in the western part of Esch-sur-Alzette, in southern Luxembourg. It is operated by Chemins de Fer Luxembourgeois, the state-owned railway company.

The station is situated on Line 60, which connects Luxembourg City to the Red Lands of the south of the country. The station was formerly open as Belval-Usines but as part of the overall regeneration of the Belval district, the station was entirely rebuilt and modernised.

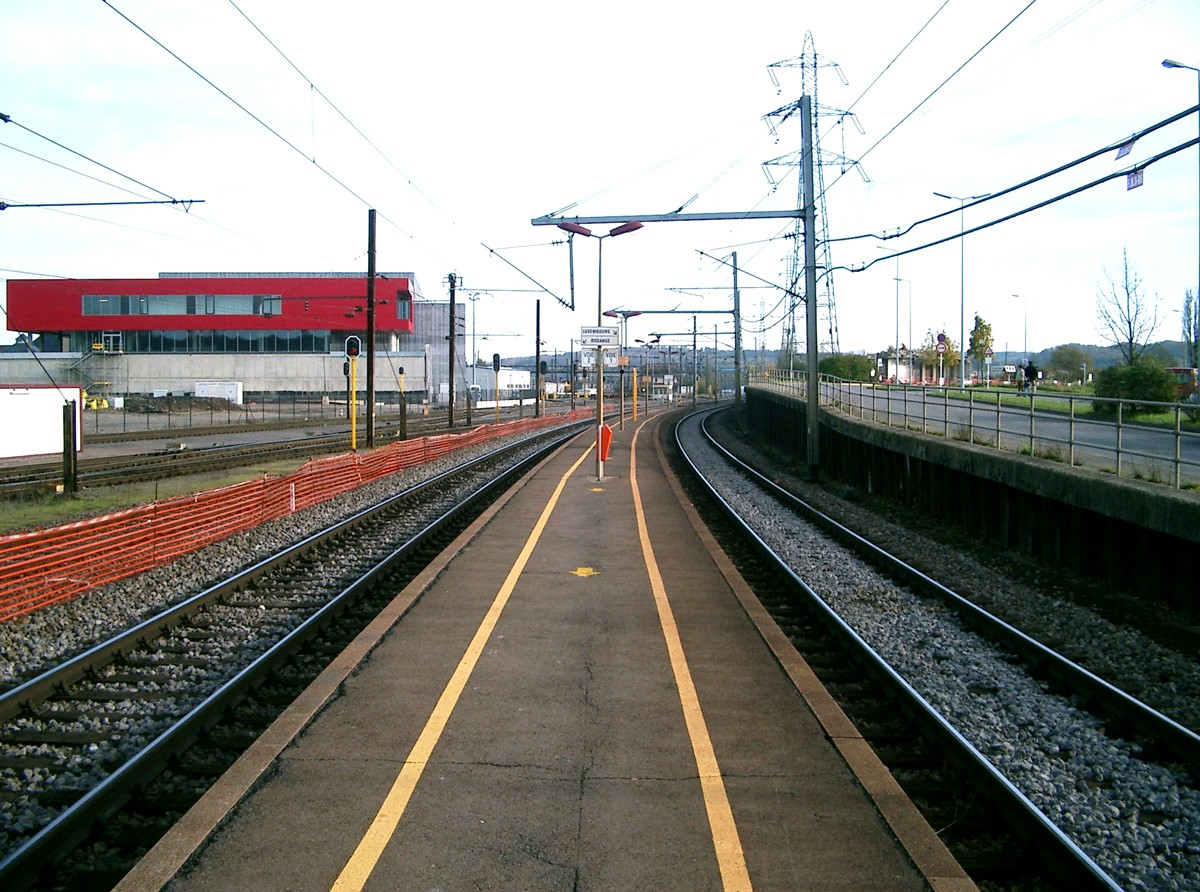
The former Belval-Usines station, pictured in 2006

| Preceding station | CFL | Following station |
|---|---|---|
| Esch-sur-Alzette towards Luxembourg | Line 60 | Belval-Lycée towards Rodange |
