= Soleuvre =

Town in Sanem, Esch-sur-Alzette, Luxembourg

Coordinates: 49°32′N 5°56′E

Soleuvre (French pronunciation: [sɔlœvʁ]; Luxembourgish: Zolwer [ˈtsolvɐ]; German: Zolwer [ˈtsɔlvɐ]) is a town in the commune of Sanem, in the canton of Esch-sur-Alzette in south-western Luxembourg. As of September 2026, the town has a population of 6,460.

== See also ==
- Zolwerknapp
