= Jean Broward Shevlin Gerard =

American diplomat

Jean Broward Shevlin Gerard

Jean Broward Shevlin Gerard (March 9, 1938 – August 5, 1996) was the American permanent representative to United Nations Educational, Scientific and Cultural Organisation (UNESCO) and is credited with playing a key role in the US pulling out of the agency under the Ronald Reagan administration. From 1985 to 1989, she served as Ambassador to Luxembourg.

== UNESCO ==
When she was appointed in 1981, her mandate was to clean up an agency perceived to be badly managed and anti West under the leadership of Amadou-Mahtar M'Bow. On December 28, 1983, the Reagan Administration decided to no longer try to pursue change and Gerard gave notice that the US would pull out and no longer provide financial support as of the end of business December 31, 1984, thereby cutting the UNESCO budget by a quarter. Britain and Singapore followed soon after.

== Personal life ==
Gerard graduated from Vassar College in 1959 and Fordham University School of Law in 1977. She was married to New York City real estate investor and military officer Brigadier General James Watson Gerard. She died of lung cancer at her home in Paris at the age of 58.
