= Josy Kirchens =

Luxembourgish footballer and manager

Personal information
- Full name: Joseph Kirchens
- Date of birth: 23 February 1943 (age 83)
- Position: Forward

Senior career*
Years	Team	Apps	(Gls)
1961–1976	Aris Bonnevoie		

International career
1966–1972	Luxembourg	16	(1)

Managerial career
- 1976–1977: Avenir Beggen
- 1985: Luxembourg
- * Club domestic league appearances and goals

Joseph "Josy" Kirchens (born 22 February 1943) is a Luxembourgish former football player and manager. A forward, he played his entire club career for Aris Bonnevoie and was capped 16 times for the Luxembourg national team. Kirchens managed Avenir Beggen for the 1976–1977 season and the Luxembourg national football team for four games in 1985.

== Career statistics ==
Scores and results list Luxembourg's goal tally first, score column indicates score after each Kirchens goal.

International goals by date, venue, opponent, score, result and competition
No.	Date	Venue	Opponent	Score	Result	Competition
1	12 October 1969	Stade Municipal, Luxembourg City, Luxembourg	Poland	1–0	1–5	1970 FIFA World Cup qualification

== Honours ==
- Luxembourg National Division: 1963–64, 1965–66, 1971–72
- Luxembourg Cup: 1966–67
