= 1952–53 Luxembourg National Division =

Luxembourg National Division
- Season: 1952–53
- Champions: FC Progrès Niedercorn (1st title)
- Matches: 132
- Goals: 474 (3.59 per match)
- Highest scoring: Union Luxembourg 3–8 National Schifflange

The 1952–53 Luxembourg National Division was the 39th season of top level association football in Luxembourg.

== Overview ==
It was performed in 12 teams, and FC Progrès Niedercorn won the championship.

== League standings ==
Pos	Team	Pld	W	D	L	GF	GA	GD	Pts
1	FC Progrès Niedercorn	22	13	6	3	52	32	+20	32
2	Jeunesse Esch	22	13	5	4	41	24	+17	31
3	Stade Dudelange	22	11	5	6	40	25	+15	27
4	FA Red Boys Differdange	22	10	2	10	37	39	−2	22
5	CS Fola Esch	22	10	2	10	25	31	−6	22
6	Union Luxembourg	22	9	3	10	44	49	−5	21
7	FC Red Star Merl-Belair	22	10	1	11	41	51	−10	21
8	National Schifflange	22	8	4	10	46	39	+7	20
9	CA Spora Luxembourg	22	9	0	13	44	42	+2	18
10	SC Tétange	22	7	3	12	33	41	−8	17
11	Alliance Dudelange	22	7	3	12	39	47	−8	17
12	Racing Rodange	22	5	6	11	32	54	−22	16

Source: rsssf.com

== Results ==
Home \ Away	ALD	FOL	JEU	NAT	PRO	RAC	RBD	RSM	SPO	STD	TÉT	UNI
Alliance Dudelange		1–2	1–2	0–3	4–1	7–2	4–0	0–1	1–3	2–2	1–5	0–4
Fola Esch	0–1		2–1	2–1	0–1	2–1	1–0	1–0	2–1	1–1	0–3	0–2
Jeunesse Esch	4–1	3–1		2–1	3–3	2–0	1–0	1–1	3–1	0–1	2–1	4–1
National Schifflange	0–1	3–1	0–0		1–3	2–0	5–2	6–2	2–1	0–1	1–3	1–3
Progrès Niederkorn	4–2	2–1	2–2	0–0		2–2	1–0	2–0	2–1	3–3	2–1	6–1
Racing Rodange	2–2	1–2	2–1	2–2	2–2		1–3	2–1	2–1	1–1	4–0	3–3
Red Boys Differdange	0–3	1–0	1–2	1–1	2–1	5–0		3–1	0–3	1–0	2–2	3–2
Red Star Merl-Belair	4–3	2–1	2–5	4–3	2–6	1–0	6–2		4–3	1–0	2–1	1–0
Spora Luxembourg	1–2	3–0	0–1	3–2	1–2	7–1	1–4	3–2		1–4	2–1	1–2
Stade Dudelange	3–0	1–1	1–2	3–1	2–1	3–0	0–3	2–1	3–0		4–0	1–2
Tétange	3–2	1–2	0–0	2–3	0–2	1–3	2–1	4–1	0–3	1–3		1–1
Union Luxembourg	1–1	1–3	2–0	3–8	2–4	4–1	2–3	3–2	2–4	3–1	0–1	

Legend: Blue = home team win; Yellow = draw; Red = away team win.
