= 1960–61 Luxembourg National Division =

Luxembourg National Division
- Season: 1960–61
- Champions: CA Spora Luxembourg (10th title)
- Matches: 132
- Goals: 455 (3.45 per match)
- Highest scoring: Union Luxembourg 8–2 SC Tétange

The 1960–61 Luxembourg National Division was the 47th season of top level association football in Luxembourg.

== Overview ==
It was performed in 12 teams, and CA Spora Luxembourg won the championship.

== League standings ==
| Pos | Team | Pld | W | D | L | GF | GA | GD | Pts |
|---|---|---|---|---|---|---|---|---|---|
| 1 | CA Spora Luxembourg | 22 | 16 | 1 | 5 | 56 | 29 | +27 | 33 |
| 2 | Jeunesse Esch | 22 | 15 | 3 | 4 | 65 | 30 | +35 | 33 |
| 3 | Union Luxembourg | 22 | 13 | 4 | 5 | 44 | 31 | +13 | 30 |
| 4 | FA Red Boys Differdange | 22 | 8 | 7 | 7 | 33 | 36 | −3 | 23 |
| 5 | Stade Dudelange | 22 | 8 | 6 | 8 | 45 | 38 | +7 | 22 |
| 6 | CS Grevenmacher | 22 | 7 | 7 | 8 | 36 | 36 | 0 | 21 |
| 7 | CS Fola Esch | 22 | 8 | 4 | 10 | 39 | 41 | −2 | 20 |
| 8 | National Schifflange | 22 | 8 | 4 | 10 | 31 | 36 | −5 | 20 |
| 9 | US Rumelange | 22 | 6 | 5 | 11 | 25 | 35 | −10 | 17 |
| 10 | FC Aris Bonnevoie | 22 | 6 | 4 | 12 | 32 | 52 | −20 | 16 |
| 11 | Chiers Rodange | 22 | 4 | 7 | 11 | 23 | 38 | −15 | 15 |
| 12 | SC Tétange | 22 | 5 | 4 | 13 | 26 | 53 | −27 | 14 |

Source: rsssf.com

== Results ==
| Home \ Away | ARI | CHI | FOL | GRE | JEU | NAT | RBD | RUM | SPO | STD | TÉT | UNI |
|---|---|---|---|---|---|---|---|---|---|---|---|---|
| Aris Bonnevoie | | 4–3 | 2–1 | 1–7 | 2–4 | 2–0 | 1–1 | 2–1 | 0–2 | 1–1 | 5–2 | 1–0 |
| Chiers Rodange | 1–0 | | 0–0 | 0–2 | 1–1 | 3–1 | 0–1 | 2–0 | 0–2 | 1–1 | 2–0 | 3–4 |
| Fola Esch | 4–1 | 6–3 | | 0–0 | 0–4 | 1–1 | 4–1 | 1–1 | 1–2 | 4–2 | 2–1 | 0–1 |
| Grevenmacher | 5–3 | 0–0 | 4–2 | | 1–2 | 2–0 | 1–2 | 1–1 | 2–6 | 2–2 | 0–2 | 2–2 |
| Jeunesse Esch | 5–1 | 1–0 | 5–1 | 2–0 | | 7–1 | 4–0 | 3–2 | 4–3 | 4–2 | 6–1 | 1–1 |
| National Schifflange | 3–1 | 0–0 | 1–3 | 1–0 | 3–1 | | 1–1 | 5–1 | 5–1 | 1–0 | 1–2 | 2–3 |
| Red Boys Differdange | 2–0 | 1–1 | 3–1 | 1–1 | 3–4 | 1–0 | | 1–0 | 3–4 | 2–1 | 3–1 | 0–2 |
| Rumelange | 3–0 | 1–0 | 1–3 | 3–0 | 1–3 | 3–1 | 1–1 | | 2–1 | 0–2 | 1–2 | 0–0 |
| Spora Luxembourg | 2–1 | 1–0 | 3–1 | 1–2 | 2–1 | 4–0 | 3–1 | 1–1 | | 7–1 | 4–1 | 3–0 |
| Stade Dudelange | 2–2 | 8–1 | 2–0 | 2–0 | 2–2 | 0–2 | 3–3 | 1–0 | 0–1 | | 3–0 | 5–0 |
| Tétange | 2–1 | 2–2 | 0–3 | 2–2 | 2–1 | 0–0 | 1–1 | 0–1 | 1–3 | 1–2 | | 1–2 |
| Union Luxembourg | 1–1 | 2–0 | 3–1 | 1–2 | 1–0 | 0–2 | 2–1 | 5–1 | 2–0 | 4–3 | 8–2 | |

Legend: Blue = home team win; Yellow = draw; Red = away team win.
