= 1948–49 Luxembourg National Division =

Luxembourg National Division
- Season: 1948–49
- Champions: CA Spora Luxembourg (8th title)
- Matches: 132
- Goals: 507 (3.84 per match)
- Highest scoring: Union Luxembourg 10–2 CS Pétange

The 1948–49 Luxembourg National Division was the 35th season of top level association football in Luxembourg.

== Overview ==
It was performed in 12 teams, and CA Spora Luxembourg won the championship.

== League standings ==
Pos	Team	Pld	W	D	L	GF	GA	GD	Pts
1	CA Spora Luxembourg	22	18	2	2	65	26	+39	38
2	CS Fola Esch	22	16	2	4	57	24	+33	34
3	Stade Dudelange	22	12	5	5	45	25	+20	29
4	National Schifflange	22	11	2	9	46	35	+11	24
5	FC Progrès Niedercorn	22	7	8	7	35	34	+1	22
6	FA Red Boys Differdange	22	8	5	9	50	38	+12	21
7	Union Luxembourg	22	6	9	7	44	39	+5	21
8	US Dudelange	22	8	5	9	40	46	−6	21
9	SC Tétange	22	7	3	12	34	50	−16	17
10	CS Oberkorn	22	7	3	12	32	63	−31	17
11	Racing Rodange	22	7	2	13	36	46	−10	16
12	CS Pétange	22	1	2	19	23	81	−58	4

Source: rsssf.com

== Results ==
Home \ Away	USD	FOL	NAT	OBE	PÉT	PRO	RAC	RBD	SPO	STD	TÉT	UNI
US Dudelange		0–1	3–1	3–4	1–1	2–0	7–4	3–2	1–2	1–3	1–0	0–0
Fola Esch	5–0		1–2	4–0	6–1	2–1	4–1	3–0	2–3	2–2	6–1	2–0
National Schifflange	4–2	1–5		10–1	4–2	0–0	5–1	1–4	0–2	1–0	0–1	0–2
Oberkorn	0–2	3–4	1–1		2–1	1–3	1–1	0–4	1–6	1–2	4–1	1–1
Pétange	2–6	0–1	1–2	1–3		2–6	1–2	1–4	1–4	2–5	2–1	1–1
Progrès Niederkorn	1–2	0–0	0–5	2–3	4–0		2–2	2–1	1–5	0–0	3–0	2–1
Racing Rodange	3–1	2–3	1–2	0–1	1–0	0–1		3–4	2–3	0–1	2–0	3–4
Red Boys Differdange	1–1	0–1	0–2	2–1	10–0	1–1	0–2		1–1	2–3	3–1	3–3
Spora Luxembourg	6–0	1–3	1–0	4–2	3–1	2–1	3–2	5–3		1–0	3–1	0–0
Stade Dudelange	1–1	0–1	2–0	7–1	3–0	1–1	3–1	0–3	2–1		3–1	2–2
Tétange	2–0	3–0	2–3	4–0	2–1	3–3	0–2	1–1	0–6	3–2		3–3
Union Luxembourg	3–3	3–1	3–2	0–1	10–2	1–1	0–1	3–1	2–3	0–3	2–4	

Legend: Blue = home team win; Yellow = draw; Red = away team win.
