= 1953–54 Luxembourg National Division =

Luxembourg National Division
- Season: 1953–54
- Champions: Jeunesse Esch (4th title)
- Matches: 132
- Goals: 475 (3.6 per match)
- Highest scoring: Union Luxembourg 2–9 CS Fola Esch

The 1953–54 Luxembourg National Division was the 40th season of top level association football in Luxembourg.

== Overview ==
It was performed in 12 teams, and Jeunesse Esch won the championship.

== League standings ==
| Pos | Team | Pld | W | D | L | GF | GA | GD | Pts |
|---|---|---|---|---|---|---|---|---|---|
| 1 | Jeunesse Esch | 22 | 14 | 5 | 3 | 51 | 27 | +24 | 33 |
| 2 | CS Fola Esch | 22 | 10 | 8 | 4 | 59 | 34 | +25 | 28 |
| 3 | FC Progrès Niedercorn | 22 | 8 | 8 | 6 | 35 | 31 | +4 | 24 |
| 4 | CS Grevenmacher | 22 | 9 | 6 | 7 | 38 | 43 | −5 | 24 |
| 5 | Union Luxembourg | 22 | 10 | 2 | 10 | 41 | 44 | −3 | 22 |
| 6 | Stade Dudelange | 22 | 5 | 11 | 6 | 26 | 25 | +1 | 21 |
| 7 | National Schifflange | 22 | 9 | 2 | 11 | 43 | 41 | +2 | 20 |
| 8 | SC Tétange | 22 | 7 | 6 | 9 | 34 | 37 | −3 | 20 |
| 9 | FA Red Boys Differdange | 22 | 5 | 9 | 8 | 34 | 29 | +5 | 19 |
| 10 | FC Red Star Merl-Belair | 22 | 7 | 5 | 10 | 46 | 53 | −7 | 19 |
| 11 | US Dudelange | 22 | 4 | 10 | 8 | 31 | 45 | −14 | 18 |
| 12 | CA Spora Luxembourg | 22 | 5 | 6 | 11 | 37 | 66 | −29 | 16 |

Source: rsssf.com

== Results ==
| Home \ Away | USD | FOL | GRE | JEU | NAT | PRO | RBD | RSM | SPO | STD | TÉT | UNI |
|---|---|---|---|---|---|---|---|---|---|---|---|---|
| US Dudelange | | 1–1 | 0–0 | 3–7 | 1–5 | 2–2 | 2–2 | 3–2 | 3–3 | 0–0 | 2–1 | 1–1 |
| Fola Esch | 2–0 | | 6–2 | 2–2 | 2–1 | 1–1 | 0–0 | 5–0 | 7–1 | 0–0 | 1–3 | 4–1 |
| Grevenmacher | 1–0 | 2–2 | | 2–3 | 2–1 | 1–2 | 3–2 | 2–1 | 4–0 | 1–1 | 3–2 | 0–1 |
| Jeunesse Esch | 3–0 | 4–1 | 3–4 | | 1–3 | 2–0 | 1–1 | 5–1 | 1–1 | 1–0 | 2–0 | 2–1 |
| National Schifflange | 2–3 | 1–3 | 3–1 | 1–2 | | 3–1 | 0–3 | 2–5 | 6–0 | 2–2 | 1–0 | 2–1 |
| Progrès Niederkorn | 1–0 | 4–1 | 2–2 | 1–2 | 2–1 | | 0–2 | 3–2 | 3–0 | 3–0 | 3–3 | 1–3 |
| Red Boys Differdange | 1–1 | 2–0 | 6–0 | 0–1 | 0–2 | 1–1 | | 2–3 | 2–2 | 1–1 | 1–1 | 3–4 |
| Red Star Merl-Belair | 4–0 | 4–5 | 1–2 | 2–2 | 3–3 | 2–2 | 3–2 | | 3–1 | 3–2 | 3–1 | 1–2 |
| Spora Luxembourg | 2–5 | 2–2 | 2–0 | 1–3 | 4–2 | 1–1 | 1–1 | 6–2 | | 1–0 | 4–1 | 1–3 |
| Stade Dudelange | 1–1 | 1–1 | 1–1 | 0–0 | 3–1 | 1–1 | 0–2 | 2–0 | 4–1 | | 0–1 | 3–1 |
| Tétange | 2–2 | 0–4 | 2–2 | 1–0 | 2–0 | 0–1 | 2–0 | 1–1 | 6–2 | 1–1 | | 1–3 |
| Union Luxembourg | 2–1 | 2–9 | 2–3 | 2–4 | 0–1 | 1–0 | 1–0 | 0–0 | 7–1 | 2–3 | 1–3 | |

Legend: Blue = home team win; Yellow = draw; Red = away team win.
