= 1937–38 Luxembourg National Division =

Football division

Luxembourg National Division
- Season: 1937–38
- Champions: CA Spora Luxembourg (7th title)
- Matches: 90
- Goals: 370 (4.11 per match)
- Highest scoring: CA Spora Luxembourg 6–4 National Schifflange

The 1937–38 Luxembourg National Division was the 28th season of top level association football in Luxembourg.

== Overview ==
It was contested by 10 teams, and CA Spora Luxembourg won the championship.

== League standings ==
Pos	Team	Pld	W	D	L	GF	GA	GD	Pts
1	CA Spora Luxembourg	18	11	4	3	48	26	+22	26
2	Jeunesse Esch	18	10	4	4	40	26	+14	24
3	Stade Dudelange	18	10	2	6	49	28	+21	22
4	US Dudelange	18	9	3	6	43	28	+15	21
5	FC Progrès Niedercorn	18	7	4	7	35	29	+6	18
6	Union Luxembourg	18	8	2	8	35	38	−3	18
7	CS Fola Esch	18	7	3	8	29	43	−14	17
8	National Schifflange	18	6	1	11	35	49	−14	13
9	AS Differdange	18	4	4	10	33	55	−22	12
10	FA Red Boys Differdange	18	3	3	12	23	48	−25	9

Source: rsssf.com

== Results ==
Home \ Away	ASD	USD	FOL	JEU	NAT	PRO	RBD	SPO	STD	UNI
AS Differdange		1–2	4–4	2–3	3–2	3–3	3–0	0–1	3–1	1–1
US Dudelange	6–0		4–0	2–0	2–3	0–0	5–1	1–1	4–2	4–3
Fola Esch	2–1	4–1		3–0	2–0	0–2	4–1	3–3	0–3	2–1
Jeunesse Esch	6–2	2–1	5–1		4–1	3–1	3–2	4–3	3–1	0–1
National Schifflange	4–1	0–1	5–0	4–4		1–5	3–2	0–1	4–2	2–1
Progrès Niederkorn	5–2	3–2	1–2	0–0	4–1		2–0	2–1	1–1	0–1
Red Boys Differdange	0–0	2–5	1–1	0–0	3–1	1–0		3–2	0–5	2–3
Spora Luxembourg	4–0	3–2	4–1	1–1	6–4	3–2	5–1		1–1	5–0
Stade Dudelange	7–2	2–0	5–0	1–0	4–0	4–2	2–1	1–2		5–2
Union Luxembourg	4–5	1–1	2–0	0–2	4–0	4–2	4–3	0–2	3–2	

Legend: Blue = home team win; Yellow = draw; Red = away team win.
