= 2000–01 Luxembourg National Division =

Luxembourg National Division
- Season: 2000–01
- Champions: F91 Dudelange (2nd titles)
- Relegated: Rodange 91; Wiltz 71
- Champions League: F91 Dudelange
- UEFA Cup: Grevenmacher; Etzella Ettelbruck (via cup)
- Intertoto Cup: Hobscheid

The 2000–01 Luxembourg National Division was the 87th season of top level association football in Luxembourg.

== Overview ==
It was performed in 12 teams, and F91 Dudelange have won the championship.

== First phase ==
=== Table ===
Pos	Team	Pld	W	D	L	GF	GA	GD	Pts	Qualification
1	F91 Dudelange	22	16	3	3	46	20	+26	51	Qualification to championship stage
2	Grevenmacher	22	15	4	3	46	12	+34	49	Qualification to championship stage
3	Etzella Ettelbruck	22	11	6	5	45	32	+13	39	Qualification to championship stage
4	Hobscheid	22	12	3	7	41	31	+10	39	Qualification to championship stage
5	Sporting Mertzig	22	9	5	8	60	43	+17	32	Qualification to relegation stage
6	Jeunesse Esch	22	9	3	10	37	29	+8	30	Qualification to relegation stage
7	Union Luxembourg	22	5	10	7	28	30	−2	25	Qualification to relegation stage
8	Rumelange	22	6	6	10	28	44	−16	24	Qualification to relegation stage
9	Rodange 91	22	7	3	12	33	57	−24	24	Qualification to relegation stage
10	Avenir Beggen	22	6	5	11	31	50	−19	23	Qualification to relegation stage
11	Mondercange	22	4	5	13	23	47	−24	17	Qualification to relegation stage
12	Wiltz 71	22	4	3	15	30	53	−23	15	Qualification to relegation stage

Source: rsssf.com

=== Results ===
Home \ Away	AVE	DUD	ETZ	GRE	HOB	JEU	MON	ROD	RUM	MER	UNI	WIL
Avenir Beggen		0–5	2–6	0–4	2–1	2–1	2–0	0–1	2–0	2–5	0–0	2–4
F91 Dudelange	1–1		3–4	1–0	2–1	2–2	4–1	4–0	2–0	1–0	3–1	2–0
Etzella Ettelbruck	5–1	0–2		1–0	1–1	1–0	1–1	4–2	1–1	1–4	1–1	1–0
Grevenmacher	2–1	3–1	0–0		3–0	2–0	3–0	4–0	1–1	3–0	3–0	4–2
Hobscheid	2–1	2–1	1–3	0–0		0–1	2–1	5–0	4–0	2–3	3–2	3–2
Jeunesse Esch	3–1	0–1	0–2	2–0	3–0		2–1	5–1	2–2	0–2	1–1	5–1
Mondercange	1–3	1–2	1–4	0–2	0–3	0–3		0–2	2–1	1–4	1–1	3–2
Rodange 91	2–3	1–3	3–1	0–3	2–3	1–0	1–1		4–2	4–0	2–2	1–2
Rumelange	2–1	1–2	3–2	1–4	1–1	1–0	1–1	4–1		1–1	0–3	2–1
Sporting Mertzig	3–3	2–3	3–3	1–2	1–3	4–0	3–4	8–1	6–1		3–3	5–2
Union Luxembourg	1–1	0–0	2–1	0–2	1–2	3–2	1–1	1–2	0–1	0–0		1–0
Wiltz 71	1–1	0–1	1–2	1–1	1–2	1–5	0–2	2–2	3–2	3–2	1–4	

Legend: Blue = home team win; Yellow = draw; Red = away team win.

== Second phase ==
=== Championship stage ===
==== Table ====
Pos	Team	Pld	W	D	L	GF	GA	GD	Pts	Qualification
1	F91 Dudelange (C)	28	19	6	3	57	26	+31	63	Qualification to Champions League first qualifying round
2	Grevenmacher	28	18	5	5	59	19	+40	59	Qualification to UEFA Cup qualifying round
3	Hobscheid	28	14	4	10	53	44	+9	46	Qualification to Intertoto Cup first round
4	Etzella Ettelbruck	28	12	7	9	51	48	+3	43	Qualification to UEFA Cup qualifying round

Source: rsssf.com
(C) Champions

==== Results ====
Home \ Away	DUD	ETZ	GRE	HOB
F91 Dudelange		1–0	1–1	4–1
Etzella Ettelbruck	1–1		0–6	3–0
Grevenmacher	1–2	2–1		2–3
Hobscheid	2–2	6–1	0–1	

Legend: Blue = home team win; Yellow = draw; Red = away team win.

=== Relegation stage ===
==== Group 1 ====
===== Table =====
Pos	Team	Pld	W	D	L	GF	GA	GD	Pts	Relegation
1	Sporting Mertzig	28	12	6	10	72	50	+22	42	
2	Union Luxembourg	28	7	12	9	35	37	−2	33	
3	Mondercange	28	8	5	15	32	54	−22	29	
4	Rodange 91 (R)	28	8	4	16	36	67	−31	28	Relegation to Luxembourg Division of Honour

Source: rsssf.com
(R) Relegated

===== Results =====
Home \ Away	MON	ROD	MER	UNI
Mondercange		1–0	2–1	3–1
Rodange 91	0–2		0–2	1–1
Sporting Mertzig	4–1	3–0		1–1
Union Luxembourg	0–1	2–0	2–1	

Legend: Blue = home team win; Yellow = draw; Red = away team win.

==== Group 2 ====
===== Table =====
Pos	Team	Pld	W	D	L	GF	GA	GD	Pts	Relegation
1	Jeunesse Esch	28	14	3	11	52	35	+17	45	
2	Avenir Beggen	28	10	6	12	45	55	−10	36	
3	Rumelange	28	6	8	14	31	56	−25	26	
4	Wiltz 71 (R)	28	5	4	19	35	67	−32	19	Relegation to Luxembourg Division of Honour

Source: rsssf.com
(R) Relegated

===== Results =====
Home \ Away	AVE	JEU	RUM	WIL
Avenir Beggen		3–1	3–0	2–0
Jeunesse Esch	2–0		1–0	1–0
Rumelange	1–1	1–5		1–1
Wiltz 71	1–5	2–5	1–0	

Legend: Blue = home team win; Yellow = draw; Red = away team win.
