= 1950–51 Luxembourg National Division =

Luxembourg National Division
- Season: 1950–51
- Champions: Jeunesse Esch (3rd title)
- Matches: 132
- Goals: 532 (4.03 per match)
- Highest scoring: Stade Dudelange 10–1 FCM Young Boys Diekirch

The 1950–51 Luxembourg National Division was the 37th season of top level association football in Luxembourg.

== Overview ==
It was performed in 12 teams, and Jeunesse Esch won the championship.

== League standings ==
Pos	Team	Pld	W	D	L	GF	GA	GD	Pts
1	Jeunesse Esch	22	14	4	4	52	24	+28	32
2	National Schifflange	22	12	6	4	58	31	+27	30
3	FA Red Boys Differdange	22	10	6	6	38	27	+11	26
4	Stade Dudelange	22	10	4	8	46	36	+10	24
5	CA Spora Luxembourg	22	9	5	8	54	38	+16	23
6	SC Tétange	22	8	7	7	43	40	+3	23
7	Union Luxembourg	22	8	7	7	47	47	0	23
8	FC Progrès Niedercorn	22	8	6	8	47	40	+7	22
9	Racing Rodange	22	9	4	9	45	53	−8	22
10	Chiers Rodange	22	6	9	7	37	46	−9	21
11	US Dudelange	22	4	4	14	35	68	−33	12
12	FCM Young Boys Diekirch	22	2	2	18	30	82	−52	6

Source: rsssf.com

== Results ==
Home \ Away	CHI	USD	JEU	NAT	PRO	RAC	RBD	SPO	STD	TÉT	UNI	YBD
Chiers Rodange		3–1	2–2	1–1	4–3	3–4	1–1	0–0	4–3	2–3	3–3	4–1
US Dudelange	2–2		1–3	3–1	1–0	1–4	0–1	3–2	3–3	2–2	1–5	3–2
Jeunesse Esch	5–0	4–2		2–1	2–3	3–1	2–1	1–0	2–0	2–1	6–0	4–1
National Schifflange	2–1	6–2	4–1		5–1	2–2	1–1	4–4	2–3	3–2	3–1	3–0
Progrès Niederkorn	1–1	4–2	0–0	1–3		1–2	1–1	1–3	3–0	4–0	0–2	7–0
Racing Rodange	0–0	7–2	0–5	0–9	0–1		3–2	1–4	1–4	3–0	3–1	4–1
Red Boys Differdange	1–1	2–0	0–3	0–1	3–3	2–1		1–0	3–1	3–3	6–1	2–0
Spora Luxembourg	0–1	7–2	0–0	2–1	2–4	2–3	1–0		5–1	3–1	1–3	4–4
Stade Dudelange	4–0	2–0	1–0	0–1	0–1	1–1	0–1	3–2		1–1	1–1	10–1
Tétange	3–1	2–0	1–1	2–2	2–2	6–3	3–1	1–3	0–2		4–1	3–0
Union Luxembourg	5–1	2–2	5–2	0–0	4–3	0–0	0–2	2–2	2–3	1–1		2–1
Young Boys Diekirch	1–2	4–2	0–2	2–3	3–3	3–2	1–4	1–7	2–3	0–2	2–6	

Legend: Blue = home team win; Yellow = draw; Red = away team win.
