= 1947–48 Luxembourg National Division =

Luxembourg National Division
- Season: 1947–48
- Champions: Stade Dudelange (6th title)
- Matches: 132
- Goals: 543 (4.11 per match)
- Highest scoring: Stade Dudelange 11–2 SC Tétange

The 1947–48 Luxembourg National Division was the 34th season of top level association football in Luxembourg.

== Overview ==
It was performed in 12 teams, and Stade Dudelange won the championship.

== League standings ==
Pos	Team	Pld	W	D	L	GF	GA	GD	Pts
1	Stade Dudelange	22	18	2	2	84	17	+67	38
2	Union Luxembourg	22	11	5	6	60	34	+26	27
3	FA Red Boys Differdange	22	11	5	6	58	35	+23	27
4	FC Progrès Niedercorn	22	11	4	7	43	31	+12	26
5	US Dudelange	22	10	5	7	58	33	+25	25
6	National Schifflange	22	9	5	8	40	36	+4	23
7	CS Fola Esch	22	9	4	9	32	37	−5	22
8	CA Spora Luxembourg	22	7	6	9	46	44	+2	20
9	SC Tétange	22	8	4	10	47	69	−22	20
10	Jeunesse Esch	22	6	7	9	31	40	−9	19
11	Sporting Club Bettembourg	22	4	1	17	24	84	−60	9
12	FC Red Black Pfaffenthal	22	2	4	16	20	83	−63	8

Source: rsssf.com

== Results ==
Home \ Away	BET	USD	FOL	JEU	NAT	PRO	RBP	RBD	SPO	STD	TÉT	UNI
Sporting Bettembourg		0–4	3–2	2–0	0–2	0–3	4–1	2–6	0–2	0–7	2–2	0–1
US Dudelange	6–1		1–2	0–1	4–1	2–1	8–0	2–2	2–3	2–3	5–1	2–5
Fola Esch	6–0	3–3		1–1	0–1	0–2	1–0	1–5	1–0	1–0	3–1	3–2
Jeunesse Esch	3–0	1–1	1–3		2–2	1–2	4–1	1–1	3–2	2–3	1–2	5–2
National Schifflange	6–1	0–0	1–0	4–1		1–3	7–0	2–3	0–3	0–8	3–1	1–2
Progrès Niederkorn	6–2	0–2	0–0	0–0	1–0		4–0	2–5	2–0	0–2	3–3	2–0
Red Black Pfaffenthal	0–2	3–0	0–2	2–0	1–1	2–2		2–5	1–3	1–5	2–4	1–1
Red Boys Differdange	10–1	0–0	3–0	0–1	1–0	2–1	4–1		1–1	0–2	6–1	1–5
Spora Luxembourg	7–1	2–6	3–3	6–1	1–1	1–2	2–2	2–1		0–2	2–2	3–3
Stade Dudelange	3–0	2–0	1–0	4–0	3–3	5–2	11–0	4–0	3–0		11–2	3–1
Tétange	3–1	2–7	5–0	1–1	1–2	2–5	4–0	2–0	3–2	2–1		1–6
Union Luxembourg	4–2	0–1	4–0	1–1	0–2	1–0	9–0	2–2	4–1	1–1	6–2	

Legend: Blue = home team win; Yellow = draw; Red = away team win.
