= 1962–63 Luxembourg National Division =

Luxembourg National Division
- Season: 1962–63
- Champions: Jeunesse Esch (8th title)
- Matches: 132
- Goals: 493 (3.73 per match)
- Highest scoring: FC Avenir Beggen 8–4 National Schifflange

The 1962–63 Luxembourg National Division was the 49th season of top level association football in Luxembourg.

== Overview ==
It was performed in 12 teams, and Jeunesse Esch won the championship.

== League standings ==
Pos	Team	Pld	W	D	L	GF	GA	GD	Pts
1	Jeunesse Esch	22	13	9	0	56	32	+24	35
2	Union Luxembourg	22	13	3	6	54	25	+29	29
3	FA Red Boys Differdange	22	11	6	5	41	21	+20	28
4	FC Aris Bonnevoie	22	11	5	6	45	32	+13	27
5	Alliance Dudelange	22	9	6	7	38	30	+8	24
6	CA Spora Luxembourg	22	8	6	8	31	27	+4	22
7	National Schifflange	22	8	4	10	49	56	−7	20
8	Stade Dudelange	22	7	6	9	46	53	−7	20
9	US Dudelange	22	7	6	9	36	44	−8	20
10	FC Avenir Beggen	22	8	2	12	41	51	−10	18
11	CS Fola Esch	22	4	7	11	29	47	−18	15
12	FC The Belval Belvaux	22	2	2	18	27	75	−48	6

Source: rsssf.com

== Results ==
Home \ Away	ALD	ARI	AVE	USD	FOL	JEU	NAT	RBD	SPO	STD	BEL	UNI
Alliance Dudelange		1–0	3–0	4–0	2–1	3–4	2–3	0–0	1–1	2–2	3–0	1–0
Aris Bonnevoie	3–0		4–2	1–4	1–3	1–1	0–1	3–2	1–0	2–4	6–0	2–0
Avenir Beggen	1–1	1–3		2–1	4–3	2–2	8–4	0–2	2–1	2–4	2–0	1–2
Dudelange	1–2	2–4	2–0		3–0	0–1	2–2	0–0	2–1	1–0	4–0	3–1
Fola Esch	0–0	1–1	1–2	1–1		0–3	3–2	0–0	3–0	2–2	2–3	0–1
Jeunesse Esch	3–1	2–1	4–3	3–1	4–1		5–2	2–0	2–2	2–2	3–2	1–1
National Schifflange	0–4	2–4	5–1	1–1	3–1	1–1		0–1	0–0	3–0	6–1	1–3
Red Boys Differdange	2–0	2–2	0–1	5–1	5–0	1–1	3–0		4–0	2–0	3–1	1–6
Spora Luxembourg	1–0	1–1	3–1	6–1	0–1	1–1	6–1	1–1		1–2	1–0	0–3
Stade Dudelange	4–4	2–2	4–3	4–0	2–2	1–4	3–8	0–2	0–1		4–3	1–3
The Belval Belvaux	2–1	0–1	1–3	4–4	4–4	3–4	2–3	0–4	0–3	0–5		1–4
Union Luxembourg	2–3	1–2	1–0	2–2	4–0	3–3	5–1	3–1	0–1	4–0	5–0	

Legend: Blue = home team win; Yellow = draw; Red = away team win.
