= 2001–02 Luxembourg National Division =

Luxembourg National Division
- Season: 2001–02
- Champions: F91 Dudelange (3rd title)
- Relegated: Etzella Ettelbruck; Hobscheid
- Champions League: F91 Dudelange
- UEFA Cup: Grevenmacher; Avenir Beggen (via cup)
- Intertoto Cup: Jeunesse Esch

The 2001–02 Luxembourg National Division was the 88th season of top level association football in Luxembourg.

== Overview ==
It was performed in 12 teams, and F91 Dudelange have won the championship.

== First phase ==
=== Table ===
Pos	Team	Pld	W	D	L	GF	GA	GD	Pts	Qualification
1	Grevenmacher	22	15	6	1	45	14	+31	51	Qualification to championship stage
2	F91 Dudelange	22	15	5	2	56	18	+38	50	Qualification to championship stage
3	Jeunesse Esch	22	12	5	5	38	22	+16	41	Qualification to championship stage
4	Union Luxembourg	22	11	4	7	38	35	+3	37	Qualification to championship stage
5	Mondercange	22	10	3	9	42	39	+3	33	Qualification to relegation stage
6	Swift Hesperange	22	8	6	8	44	37	+7	30	Qualification to relegation stage
7	Avenir Beggen	22	6	8	8	30	39	−9	26	Qualification to relegation stage
8	Sporting Mertzig	22	6	6	10	24	41	−17	24	Qualification to relegation stage
9	Rumelange	22	4	8	10	28	42	−14	20	Qualification to relegation stage
10	Progrès Niederkorn	22	5	5	12	29	51	−22	20	Qualification to relegation stage
11	Hobscheid	22	4	6	12	34	52	−18	18	Qualification to relegation stage
12	Etzella Ettelbruck	22	3	4	15	33	51	−18	13	Qualification to relegation stage

Source: rsssf.com

=== Results ===
Home \ Away	AVE	DUD	ETZ	GRE	HOB	JEU	MON	PRO	RUM	MER	SWI	UNI
Avenir Beggen		0–0	1–1	0–5	3–3	1–1	3–2	2–3	1–3	1–2	1–1	2–2
F91 Dudelange	3–0		3–2	1–1	6–2	0–1	5–1	3–0	1–1	3–0	1–2	3–0
Etzella Ettelbruck	1–3	2–3		1–3	3–0	1–5	2–3	2–4	0–0	1–1	2–2	3–1
Grevenmacher	2–1	0–0	2–1		4–0	0–0	2–0	1–1	4–1	1–1	2–1	2–1
Hobscheid	3–0	2–4	2–1	1–2		1–2	2–2	1–1	3–1	1–3	3–3	0–1
Jeunesse Esch	0–2	0–1	1–0	1–0	3–2		1–1	1–3	2–2	3–0	3–1	1–2
Mondercange	2–0	1–6	5–2	0–1	4–3	0–2		2–0	3–0	2–4	1–2	3–0
Progrès Niederkorn	3–3	0–1	1–4	1–3	0–1	0–3	0–0		1–4	0–2	2–1	2–4
Rumelange	0–1	1–1	2–0	2–3	1–1	2–5	0–4	1–1		3–0	0–2	3–3
Sporting Mertzig	1–1	0–3	3–2	0–5	1–1	0–2	2–4	0–1	2–0		0–0	0–4
Swift Hesperange	1–2	1–3	4–1	0–1	3–2	1–1	1–2	7–4	4–1	1–1		4–1
Union Luxembourg	0–2	1–5	2–1	0–0	3–0	2–0	1–0	5–1	0–0	2–1	3–2	

Legend: Blue = home team win; Yellow = draw; Red = away team win.

== Second phase ==
=== Championship stage ===
==== Table ====
Pos	Team	Pld	W	D	L	GF	GA	GD	Pts	Qualification
1	F91 Dudelange (C)	28	19	5	4	64	23	+41	62	Qualification to Champions League first qualifying round
2	Grevenmacher	28	17	7	4	51	22	+29	58	Qualification to UEFA Cup qualifying round
3	Union Luxembourg	28	14	5	9	42	39	+3	47	
4	Jeunesse Esch	28	13	7	8	45	31	+14	46	Qualification to Intertoto Cup first round

Source: rsssf.com
(C) Champions

==== Results ====
Home \ Away	DUD	GRE	JEU	UNI
F91 Dudelange		1–0	2–1	0–1
Grevenmacher	0–2		2–0	2–0
Jeunesse Esch	3–1	3–3		0–1
Union Luxembourg	0–2	2–0	0–0	

Legend: Blue = home team win; Yellow = draw; Red = away team win.

=== Relegation stage ===
==== Group 1 ====
===== Table =====
Pos	Team	Pld	W	D	L	GF	GA	GD	Pts	Relegation
1	Mondercange	28	12	5	11	53	51	+2	41	
2	Rumelange	28	8	8	12	47	55	−8	32	
3	Avenir Beggen	28	7	11	10	40	50	−10	32	Qualification to UEFA Cup qualifying round
4	Hobscheid (R)	28	6	7	15	44	65	−21	25	Relegation to Luxembourg Division of Honour

Source: rsssf.com
(R) Relegated

===== Results =====
Home \ Away	AVE	HOB	MON	RUM
Avenir Beggen		1–2	2–2	2–3
Hobscheid	2–2		2–0	2–4
Mondercange	1–1	3–0		4–2
Rumelange	1–2	4–2	5–1	

Legend: Blue = home team win; Yellow = draw; Red = away team win.

==== Group 2 ====
===== Table =====
Pos	Team	Pld	W	D	L	GF	GA	GD	Pts	Relegation
1	Swift Hesperange	28	10	6	12	56	47	+9	36	
2	Sporting Mertzig	28	9	7	12	33	50	−17	34	
3	Progrès Niederkorn	28	7	7	14	38	62	−24	28	
4	Etzella Ettelbruck (R)	28	6	5	17	47	65	−18	23	Relegation to Luxembourg Division of Honour

Source: rsssf.com
(R) Relegated

===== Results =====
Home \ Away	ETZ	PRO	MER	SWI
Etzella Ettelbruck		3–3	3–0	1–0
Progrès Niederkorn	0–3		1–2	2–1
Sporting Mertzig	2–1	2–2		2–0
Swift Hesperange	9–3	0–1	2–1	

Legend: Blue = home team win; Yellow = draw; Red = away team win.
