= 1972–73 Luxembourg National Division =

Luxembourg National Division
- Season: 1972–73
- Champions: Jeunesse Esch (12th title)
- Matches: 132
- Goals: 496 (3.76 per match)

The 1972–73 Luxembourg National Division was the 59th season of top level association football in Luxembourg.

== Overview ==
It was performed in 12 teams, and Jeunesse Esch won the championship.

== League standings ==
Pos	Team	Pld	W	D	L	GF	GA	GD	Pts
1	Jeunesse Esch	22	17	4	1	69	19	+50	38
2	Union Luxembourg	22	11	8	3	55	34	+21	30
3	CS Fola Esch	22	10	7	5	47	29	+18	27
4	FA Red Boys Differdange	22	12	3	7	53	35	+18	27
5	FC Etzella Ettelbruck	22	8	7	7	52	49	+3	23
6	US Rumelange	22	8	7	7	35	33	+2	23
7	FC Aris Bonnevoie	22	7	8	7	31	30	+1	22
8	FC Avenir Beggen	22	8	4	10	46	50	−4	20
9	CA Spora Luxembourg	22	7	5	10	32	41	−9	19
10	National Schifflange	22	5	6	11	29	39	−10	16
11	SC Tétange	22	4	5	13	26	52	−26	13
12	Sporting Club Bettembourg	22	2	2	18	21	85	−64	6

Source: rsssf.com

== Results ==
Home \ Away	ARI	AVE	BET	ETZ	FOL	JEU	NAT	RBD	RUM	SPO	TÉT	UNI
Aris Bonnevoie		1–0	5–2	0–0	0–0	0–5	3–0	1–2	1–1	0–1	1–1	1–2
Avenir Beggen	3–1		9–2	1–2	3–2	1–2	1–0	1–3	1–4	1–1	2–2	1–1
Sporting Bettembourg	0–5	4–2		1–6	0–5	0–3	2–0	1–6	0–2	3–3	0–1	0–5
Etzella Ettelbruck	0–0	3–5	4–3		2–2	1–0	7–1	2–6	1–2	3–3	3–1	4–4
Fola Esch	1–1	1–1	4–2	6–2		1–2	3–2	2–2	2–1	4–0	5–1	0–2
Jeunesse Esch	4–1	5–1	7–0	3–0	2–1		1–1	3–1	2–2	3–1	6–1	5–1
National Schifflange	2–3	1–0	4–0	1–1	1–1	1–1		0–1	0–3	0–3	7–0	3–1
Red Boys Differdange	1–1	5–1	5–0	0–2	2–3	0–1	4–1		0–2	2–0	3–1	2–4
Rumelange	1–1	3–5	0–0	1–4	0–1	1–6	2–0	2–2		1–0	3–0	0–2
Spora Luxembourg	0–1	0–5	4–1	2–2	1–0	2–3	0–2	5–2	2–1		1–0	2–4
Tétange	2–3	1–2	1–0	4–1	1–2	1–4	1–1	0–1	1–1	2–0		1–3
Union Luxembourg	2–1	6–0	4–0	3–2	1–1	1–1	1–1	2–3	2–2	1–1	3–3	

Legend: Blue = home team win; Yellow = draw; Red = away team win.
