= 1956–57 Luxembourg National Division =

Luxembourg National Division
- Season: 1956–57
- Champions: Stade Dudelange (9th title)
- Matches: 132
- Goals: 529 (4.01 per match)
- Highest scoring: CA Spora Luxembourg 10–1 FC Red Star Merl-Belair

The 1956–57 Luxembourg National Division was the 43rd season of top level association football in Luxembourg.

== Overview ==
It was performed in 12 teams, and Stade Dudelange won the championship.

== League standings ==
Pos	Team	Pld	W	D	L	GF	GA	GD	Pts
1	Stade Dudelange	22	17	3	2	71	14	+57	37
2	Jeunesse Esch	22	14	3	5	47	24	+23	31
3	FA Red Boys Differdange	22	12	3	7	41	25	+16	27
4	CS Grevenmacher	22	10	4	8	56	39	+17	24
5	CA Spora Luxembourg	22	8	6	8	61	49	+12	22
6	Union Luxembourg	22	9	3	10	38	42	−4	21
7	Alliance Dudelange	22	8	5	9	38	42	−4	21
8	FC Progrès Niedercorn	22	9	3	10	40	46	−6	21
9	SC Tétange	22	8	4	10	37	48	−11	20
10	CS Fola Esch	22	5	9	8	35	53	−18	19
11	National Schifflange	22	6	5	11	36	48	−12	17
12	FC Red Star Merl-Belair	22	1	2	19	29	99	−70	4

Source: rsssf.com

== Results ==
Home \ Away	ALD	FOL	GRE	JEU	NAT	PRO	RBD	RSM	SPO	STD	TÉT	UNI
Alliance Dudelange		7–2	1–1	2–0	1–1	3–1	0–2	2–0	4–2	0–5	4–1	1–2
Fola Esch	1–1		2–2	0–0	0–5	0–0	2–4	6–3	2–2	1–1	1–1	0–2
Grevenmacher	5–1	5–0		0–3	4–3	3–4	2–0	9–0	2–2	0–5	3–2	3–0
Jeunesse Esch	2–0	2–0	2–1		2–0	3–0	4–0	4–1	2–3	1–0	4–1	1–1
National Schifflange	2–2	1–4	2–3	3–1		2–2	2–0	3–0	4–2	2–2	1–4	0–5
Progrès Niederkorn	2–1	0–2	2–1	1–2	6–0		1–0	4–4	1–4	1–7	4–0	2–0
Red Boys Differdange	5–0	2–0	2–1	1–1	0–1	1–2		6–0	2–1	0–0	4–0	1–0
Red Star Merl-Belair	2–4	3–5	1–5	1–5	2–1	1–3	1–3		4–4	0–7	3–6	0–2
Spora Luxembourg	2–2	4–4	3–1	1–5	3–1	3–1	1–1	10–1		0–1	4–1	8–0
Stade Dudelange	1–0	7–1	3–0	4–0	1–0	4–0	2–1	7–1	5–0		1–0	5–1
Tétange	2–0	1–1	1–1	2–0	2–0	3–2	2–3	1–0	3–2	1–2		0–5
Union Luxembourg	1–2	0–1	0–4	2–3	2–2	2–1	2–3	2–1	2–0	4–1	3–3	

Legend: Blue = home team win; Yellow = draw; Red = away team win.
