= 1954–55 Luxembourg National Division =

Luxembourg National Division
- Season: 1954–55
- Champions: Stade Dudelange (8th title)
- Matches: 132
- Goals: 509 (3.86 per match)
- Highest scoring: Alliance Dudelange 8–3 FC Red Star Merl-Belair

The 1954–55 Luxembourg National Division was the 41st season of top level association football in Luxembourg.

== Overview ==
It was performed in 12 teams, and Stade Dudelange won the championship.

== League standings ==
Pos	Team	Pld	W	D	L	GF	GA	GD	Pts
1	Stade Dudelange	22	15	4	3	55	28	+27	34
2	CS Fola Esch	22	10	5	7	55	43	+12	25
3	Union Luxembourg	22	10	4	8	41	40	+1	24
4	National Schifflange	22	9	5	8	39	30	+9	23
5	FC Progrès Niedercorn	22	9	5	8	41	32	+9	23
6	FC Red Star Merl-Belair	22	7	9	6	46	46	0	23
7	FA Red Boys Differdange	22	6	9	7	33	35	−2	21
8	Alliance Dudelange	22	9	3	10	47	51	−4	21
9	Jeunesse Esch	22	7	6	9	42	44	−2	20
10	Racing Rodange	22	7	6	9	40	48	−8	20
11	CS Grevenmacher	22	7	3	12	36	56	−20	17
12	SC Tétange	22	5	3	14	34	56	−22	13

Source: rsssf.com

== Results ==
Home \ Away	ALD	FOL	GRE	JEU	NAT	PRO	RAC	RBD	RSM	STD	TÉT	UNI
Alliance Dudelange		3–7	1–2	2–1	4–4	1–2	1–4	0–1	8–3	2–1	4–2	3–0
Fola Esch	4–2		6–0	1–6	2–1	2–2	2–1	2–2	1–3	0–2	4–2	2–1
Grevenmacher	2–0	0–2		1–1	1–0	1–1	4–2	2–1	3–4	3–6	0–1	6–0
Jeunesse Esch	2–4	3–2	1–2		1–5	2–1	2–2	1–1	4–0	2–3	2–2	2–4
National Schifflange	2–2	4–2	3–0	5–0		0–1	1–0	2–1	0–0	3–1	1–0	3–3
Progrès Niederkorn	1–3	2–2	7–1	3–0	3–0		2–1	3–0	3–3	1–2	2–1	1–2
Racing Rodange	2–1	2–4	2–2	2–2	1–0	3–1		1–1	1–5	1–1	5–2	2–2
Red Boys Differdange	2–2	1–1	2–1	1–3	2–1	2–1	1–2		1–1	2–2	6–3	0–1
Red Star Merl-Belair	1–2	1–1	4–2	1–1	3–1	1–2	5–2	1–1		2–2	3–5	1–1
Stade Dudelange	5–0	3–2	2–0	1–0	1–2	2–0	5–0	1–1	4–2		4–1	1–0
Tétange	0–2	0–6	3–2	1–4	0–0	0–0	1–2	3–2	0–1	2–3		4–0
Union Luxembourg	3–0	2–0	7–1	0–2	2–1	3–2	3–2	1–2	1–1	2–3	3–1	

Legend: Blue = home team win; Yellow = draw; Red = away team win.
