= 1969–70 Luxembourg National Division =

Luxembourg National Division
- Season: 1969–70
- Champions: Jeunesse Esch (11th title)
- Matches: 132
- Goals: 479 (3.63 per match)
- Highest scoring: Spora Luxembourg 7–3 Aris Bonnevoie; Jeunesse Esch 6–4 Stade Dudelange; US Mondorf 0–10 Red Boys Differdange; Spora Luxembourg 10–0 US Mondorf

The 1969–70 Luxembourg National Division was the 56th season of top level association football in Luxembourg.

== Overview ==
It was performed in 12 teams, and Jeunesse Esch won the championship.

== League standings ==
Pos	Team	Pld	W	D	L	GF	GA	GD	Pts
1	Jeunesse Esch	22	15	6	1	55	15	+40	36
2	US Rumelange	22	13	5	4	49	24	+25	31
3	CA Spora Luxembourg	22	14	2	6	60	32	+28	30
4	FA Red Boys Differdange	22	12	4	6	56	37	+19	28
5	Union Luxembourg	22	9	5	8	52	36	+16	23
6	FC Aris Bonnevoie	22	10	3	9	37	42	−5	23
7	FC Avenir Beggen	22	9	4	9	31	31	0	22
8	SC Tétange	22	6	6	10	25	44	−19	18
9	Stade Dudelange	22	8	1	13	41	44	−3	17
10	FC Progrès Niedercorn	22	4	8	10	28	45	−17	16
11	US Dudelange	22	3	9	10	24	43	−19	15
12	US Mondorf	22	2	1	19	21	86	−65	5

Source: rsssf.com

== Results ==
Home \ Away	ARI	AVE	USD	JEU	MON	PRO	RBD	RUM	SPO	STD	TÉT	UNI
Aris Bonnevoie		1–0	2–1	0–3	2–0	1–1	2–1	1–4	4–2	2–1	3–2	1–4
Avenir Beggen	1–0		1–0	0–4	2–1	3–2	2–2	0–2	0–2	2–3	3–0	0–0
US Dudelange	0–0	1–1		0–0	3–2	1–1	0–3	1–4	1–1	3–3	1–2	1–1
Jeunesse Esch	3–0	1–0	4–0		6–1	4–0	4–0	1–1	3–2	6–4	0–0	0–0
Mondorf	1–5	1–4	2–3	0–3		1–3	0–10	2–0	3–4	2–1	1–1	0–9
Progrès Niederkorn	1–0	0–2	2–2	2–2	4–2		0–2	1–1	2–3	0–2	1–1	3–5
Red Boys Differdange	2–1	0–3	4–0	2–1	4–0	1–0		3–2	3–5	4–2	3–3	3–2
Rumelange	1–1	3–0	2–1	2–2	3–0	3–3	3–2		2–1	1–0	3–0	0–1
Spora Luxembourg	7–3	3–1	1–0	1–2	10–0	6–0	2–2	2–1		0–1	2–0	3–2
Stade Dudelange	4–1	2–1	4–1	0–3	5–2	0–1	0–1	0–2	0–1		6–1	2–7
Tétange	0–3	2–2	1–2	0–2	2–0	2–0	2–2	0–5	0–2	1–0		3–2
Union Luxembourg	3–4	1–3	2–2	0–1	2–0	1–1	3–2	2–4	2–0	2–1	1–2	

Legend: Blue = home team win; Yellow = draw; Red = away team win.
