= 1999–2000 Luxembourg National Division =

Football season in Luxembourg

Luxembourg National Division
- Season: 1999–2000
- Champions: F91 Dudelange (1st title)
- Relegated: Aris Bonnevoie; Schifflange 95
- Champions League: F91 Dudelange
- UEFA Cup: Grevenmacher; Jeunesse Esch (via cup)
- Intertoto Cup: Hobscheid

The 1999–2000 Luxembourg National Division was the 86th season of top level association football in Luxembourg.

== Overview ==
It was performed in 12 teams, and F91 Dudelange won the championship after a play off phase.

== First phase ==
=== Table ===
Pos	Team	Pld	W	D	L	GF	GA	GD	Pts	Qualification
1	Grevenmacher	22	11	8	3	42	18	+24	41	Qualification to championship stage
2	F91 Dudelange	22	11	8	3	36	20	+16	41	Qualification to championship stage
3	Avenir Beggen	22	12	4	6	32	19	+13	40	Qualification to championship stage
4	Jeunesse Esch	22	10	8	4	36	26	+10	38	Qualification to championship stage
5	Sporting Mertzig	22	11	4	7	35	25	+10	37	Qualification to relegation stage
6	Union Luxembourg	22	8	9	5	29	23	+6	33	Qualification to relegation stage
7	Hobscheid	22	9	5	8	35	26	+9	32	Qualification to relegation stage
8	Rumelange	22	8	5	9	28	38	−10	29	Qualification to relegation stage
9	Wiltz 71	22	6	7	9	34	37	−3	25	Qualification to relegation stage
10	Mondercange	22	7	4	11	35	45	−10	25	Qualification to relegation stage
11	Schifflange 95	22	4	4	14	24	39	−15	16	Qualification to relegation stage
12	Aris Bonnevoie	22	1	2	19	14	64	−50	5	Qualification to relegation stage

Source: rsssf.com

=== Results ===
Home \ Away	ARI	AVE	DUD	GRE	HOB	JEU	MON	RUM	SCH	MER	UNI	WIL
Aris Bonnevoie		0–1	0–2	1–1	0–4	6–2	2–4	2–3	4–3	1–2	0–2	0–1
Avenir Beggen	4–0		1–1	1–2	0–1	1–0	0–0	2–1	2–0	2–0	1–1	2–0
F91 Dudelange	3–0	1–1		1–1	2–1	1–1	3–0	1–0	3–0	2–2	0–2	3–1
Grevenmacher	3–0	3–1	2–2		1–1	0–0	4–0	4–0	2–1	2–0	0–3	2–2
Hobscheid	7–1	1–3	1–2	0–3		1–1	2–1	4–1	2–1	1–1	1–0	0–0
Jeunesse Esch	2–0	2–1	0–0	1–2	2–1		2–2	2–1	3–1	2–3	1–1	2–1
Mondercange	6–0	0–2	4–2	0–3	3–0	2–3		4–2	4–2	1–3	1–1	1–2
Rumelange	1–0	0–2	1–1	1–0	0–4	2–2	3–0		2–1	1–1	3–0	3–2
Schifflange 95	3–0	1–2	1–0	1–1	1–3	0–2	0–1	1–2		1–0	1–1	2–2
Sporting Mertzig	4–2	3–0	1–2	1–0	1–0	1–2	0–0	4–0	1–0		0–1	5–1
Union Luxembourg	1–1	2–1	0–2	1–1	0–0	2–1	3–0	1–1	2–3	3–0		1–1
Wiltz 71	5–0	0–2	0–2	0–5	2–0	3–3	6–1	0–0	0–0	1–2	2–4	

Legend: Blue = home team win; Yellow = draw; Red = away team win.

== Second phase ==
=== Championship stage ===
==== Table ====
Pos	Team	Pld	W	D	L	GF	GA	GD	Pts	Qualification
1	F91 Dudelange (C)	28	16	9	3	54	29	+25	57	Qualification to Champions League first qualifying round
2	Grevenmacher	28	12	10	6	49	27	+22	46	Qualification to UEFA Cup qualifying round
3	Jeunesse Esch	28	12	10	6	50	37	+13	46	Qualification to UEFA Cup qualifying round
4	Avenir Beggen	28	13	5	10	39	36	+3	44	

Source: rsssf.com
(C) Champions

==== Results ====
Home \ Away	AVE	DUD	GRE	JEU
Avenir Beggen		2–3	0–2	2–2
F91 Dudelange	5–1		1–1	4–2
Grevenmacher	0–1	2–3		0–2
Jeunesse Esch	5–1	1–2	2–2	

Legend: Blue = home team win; Yellow = draw; Red = away team win.

=== Relegation stage ===
==== Group 1 ====
===== Table =====
Pos	Team	Pld	W	D	L	GF	GA	GD	Pts	Relegation
1	Hobscheid	28	13	5	10	51	43	+8	44	Qualification to Intertoto Cup first round
2	Sporting Mertzig	28	12	4	12	52	43	+9	40	
3	Wiltz 71	28	8	7	13	45	51	−6	31	
4	Schifflange 95 (R)	28	9	4	15	38	48	−10	31	Relegation to Luxembourg Division of Honour

Source: rsssf.com
(R) Relegated

===== Results =====
Home \ Away	HOB	SCH	MER	WIL
Hobscheid		3–0	2–1	4–2
Schifflange 95	2–0		2–1	3–1
Sporting Mertzig	10–3	4–5		0–3
Wiltz 71	2–4	0–2	3–1	

Legend: Blue = home team win; Yellow = draw; Red = away team win.

==== Group 2 ====
===== Table =====
Pos	Team	Pld	W	D	L	GF	GA	GD	Pts	Relegation
1	Mondercange	28	11	5	12	53	51	+2	38	
2	Rumelange	28	10	6	12	36	50	−14	36	
3	Union Luxembourg	28	8	11	9	34	34	0	35	
4	Aris Bonnevoie (R)	28	5	2	21	27	79	−52	17	Relegation to Luxembourg Division of Honour

Source: rsssf.com
(R) Relegated

===== Results =====
Home \ Away	ARI	MON	RUM	UNI
Aris Bonnevoie		3–2	2–1	3–2
Mondercange	5–1		6–1	1–1
Rumelange	4–2	0–1		2–1
Union Luxembourg	1–2	0–3	0–0	

Legend: Blue = home team win; Yellow = draw; Red = away team win.
