= 1998–99 Luxembourg National Division =

Luxembourg National Division
- Season: 1998–99
- Champions: Jeunesse Esch (26th titles)
- Relegated: Pétange; Spora
- Champions League: Jeunesse Esch
- UEFA Cup: F91 Dudelange; Mondercange (via cup)
- Intertoto Cup: Union Luxembourg

The 1998–99 Luxembourg National Division was the 85th season of top level association football in Luxembourg.

== Overview ==
It was performed in 12 teams, and Jeunesse Esch won the championship.

== League standings ==
Pos	Team	Pld	W	D	L	GF	GA	GD	Pts	Qualification or relegation
1	Jeunesse Esch (C)	22	16	3	3	56	13	+43	51	Qualification to Champions League first qualifying round
2	F91 Dudelange	22	14	5	3	40	18	+22	47	Qualification to UEFA Cup qualifying round
3	Avenir Beggen	22	14	3	5	65	21	+44	45	
4	Union Luxembourg	22	12	7	3	46	18	+28	43	Qualification to Intertoto Cup first round
5	Grevenmacher	22	13	2	7	50	26	+24	41	
6	Sporting Mertzig	22	10	5	7	51	34	+17	35	
7	Mondercange	22	6	6	10	26	42	−16	24	Qualification to UEFA Cup qualifying round
8	Aris Bonnevoie	22	7	3	12	26	51	−25	24	
9	Hobscheid	22	7	2	13	43	50	−7	23	
10	Wiltz 71	22	6	2	14	25	54	−29	20	
11	Pétange (R)	22	4	2	16	16	71	−55	14	Relegation to Luxembourg Division of Honour
12	Spora Luxembourg (R)	22	2	2	18	17	63	−46	8	Relegation to Luxembourg Division of Honour

Source: rsssf.com
(C) Champions; (R) Relegated

== Results ==
Home \ Away	ARI	AVE	DUD	GRE	HOB	JEU	MON	PÉT	SPO	MER	UNI
Aris Bonnevoie		0–1	0–2	1–4	2–1	0–5	1–1	1–4	0–1	0–3	1–1
Avenir Beggen	2–1		0–1	1–5	3–3	1–0	5–1	10–0	3–2	1–1	0–0
F91 Dudelange	4–1	1–0		2–1	7–3	0–3	0–1	0–0	3–0	2–1	0–1
Grevenmacher	2–3	0–5	0–1		3–1	2–0	4–1	7–1	2–0	0–2	0–0
Hobscheid	0–1	0–1	2–2	2–3		1–2	2–1	2–1	1–4	3–5	0–4
Jeunesse Esch	5–0	2–1	0–1	1–0	2–1		2–0	3–0	4–1	4–1	1–1
Mondercange	1–1	2–6	0–0	1–1	2–0	1–2		1–0	3–2	3–3	0–3
Pétange	0–6	0–8	0–3	0–5	0–4	0–5	0–1		3–0	3–0	2–2
Spora Luxembourg	0–3	0–5	1–3	0–2	1–2	0–5	1–1	0–1		1–3	0–5
Sporting Mertzig	5–0	1–4	2–2	2–3	5–1	0–0	3–1	4–0	5–0		3–1
Union Luxembourg	7–0	1–0	1–1	1–0	0–2	1–1	3–2	4–0	5–1	2–0	

Legend: Blue = home team win; Yellow = draw; Red = away team win.
