= 1951–52 Luxembourg National Division =

Luxembourg National Division
- Season: 1951–52
- Champions: National Schifflange (1st title)
- Matches: 90
- Goals: 327 (3.63 per match)
- Highest scoring: SC Tétange 7–4 CS Fola Esch; Union Luxembourg 7–4 CA Spora Luxembourg

The 1951–52 Luxembourg National Division was the 38th season of top level association football in Luxembourg.

== Overview ==
It was performed in 10 teams, and National Schifflange won the championship.

== League standings ==
Pos	Team	Pld	W	D	L	GF	GA	GD	Pts
1	National Schifflange	18	10	4	4	39	26	+13	24
2	CA Spora Luxembourg	18	10	3	5	35	28	+7	23
3	Stade Dudelange	18	9	3	6	24	22	+2	21
4	FC Progrès Niedercorn	18	6	6	6	37	34	+3	18
5	FA Red Boys Differdange	18	6	6	6	26	27	−1	18
6	CS Fola Esch	18	8	2	8	39	40	−1	18
7	Jeunesse Esch	18	6	5	7	35	28	+7	17
8	Union Luxembourg	18	8	1	9	40	45	−5	17
9	SC Tétange	18	5	6	7	29	31	−2	16
10	Racing Rodange	18	1	6	11	23	46	−23	8

Source: rsssf.com

== Results ==
Home \ Away	FOL	JEU	NAT	PRO	RAC	RBD	SPO	STD	TÉT	UNI
Fola Esch		2–1	1–0	3–3	7–3	1–2	1–0	1–2	4–0	5–1
Jeunesse Esch	4–1		2–3	2–2	1–2	4–1	2–2	3–1	3–1	5–2
National Schifflange	4–1	2–1		2–1	1–1	2–1	0–1	3–3	3–3	1–5
Progrès Niederkorn	1–2	1–0	1–3		4–1	2–2	1–4	3–0	3–1	3–2
Racing Rodange	1–1	2–5	0–7	3–3		1–1	2–3	0–1	0–0	2–3
Red Boys Differdange	2–1	0–0	1–3	2–2	1–0		2–2	0–1	1–0	1–2
Spora Luxembourg	4–1	0–0	3–2	3–1	1–0	1–3		2–0	1–0	1–0
Stade Dudelange	3–0	1–0	0–1	1–1	1–0	2–0	3–1		2–2	2–3
Tétange	7–4	4–1	1–1	2–1	2–2	0–0	3–2	0–1		2–0
Union Luxembourg	2–3	1–1	0–1	1–4	4–3	3–6	7–4	2–0	2–1	

Legend: Blue = home team win; Yellow = draw; Red = away team win.
