= 1963–64 Luxembourg National Division =

Luxembourg National Division
- Season: 1963–64
- Champions: FC Aris Bonnevoie (1st title)
- Matches: 132
- Goals: 483 (3.66 per match)
- Highest scoring: US Dudelange 2–7 Stade Dudelange; FC Avenir Beggen 3–6 Union Luxembourg; Stade Dudelange 6–3 Union Luxembourg

The 1963–64 Luxembourg National Division was the 50th season of top level association football in Luxembourg.

== Overview ==
It was performed in 12 teams, and FC Aris Bonnevoie won the championship.

== League standings ==
Pos	Team	Pld	W	D	L	GF	GA	GD	Pts
1	FC Aris Bonnevoie	22	15	3	4	55	22	+33	33
2	Union Luxembourg	22	13	5	4	61	31	+30	31
3	Stade Dudelange	22	13	4	5	57	32	+25	30
4	FA Red Boys Differdange	22	11	4	7	32	27	+5	26
5	Jeunesse Esch	22	11	3	8	38	30	+8	25
6	CA Spora Luxembourg	22	10	4	8	43	33	+10	24
7	Jeunesse Wasserbillig	22	9	5	8	40	36	+4	23
8	Alliance Dudelange	22	6	5	11	40	50	−10	17
9	US Dudelange	22	7	3	12	33	46	−13	17
10	National Schifflange	22	5	5	12	29	55	−26	15
11	FC Progrès Niederkorn	22	4	4	14	21	57	−36	12
12	FC Avenir Beggen	22	4	3	15	34	64	−30	11

Source: rsssf.com

== Results ==
Home \ Away	ALD	ARI	AVE	USD	JEU	NAT	PRO	RBD	SPO	STD	UNI	WAS
Alliance Dudelange		1–3	3–0	2–2	3–1	2–2	4–0	1–2	2–3	3–1	1–4	0–2
Aris Bonnevoie	6–0		3–1	2–1	0–3	5–0	3–1	4–1	2–1	6–1	1–0	2–1
Avenir Beggen	3–3	1–4		1–2	1–1	2–0	1–1	3–1	1–4	1–2	3–6	3–0
US Dudelange	1–2	0–4	5–1		1–2	1–2	2–0	2–0	2–2	2–7	1–3	0–1
Jeunesse Esch	2–1	1–0	4–2	0–2		1–3	4–0	4–1	1–0	1–1	0–0	0–2
National Schifflange	2–3	2–2	2–1	3–3	2–0		3–4	1–5	1–3	1–0	1–7	1–1
Progrès Niederkorn	3–1	2–1	2–6	0–2	0–1	1–0		0–1	1–2	1–1	0–7	2–2
Red Boys Differdange	2–2	0–1	4–0	2–1	1–0	3–0	2–0		1–0	1–1	0–2	3–2
Spora Luxembourg	4–1	1–3	5–0	1–0	2–5	0–0	2–2	0–1		4–2	2–2	
Stade Dudelange	2–1	2–1	4–0	7–0	5–0	4–1	3–1	0–0	3–2		6–3	2–1
Union Luxembourg	3–2	0–0	3–1	2–0	1–6	4–0	6–0	1–1	1–0	2–1		2–2
Jeunesse Wasserbillig	2–2	2–2	5–2	2–3	2–1	3–2	3–0	2–0	0–1	0–2	3–2	

Legend: Blue = home team win; Yellow = draw; Red = away team win.
