= 1936–37 Luxembourg National Division =

Luxembourg National Division
- Season: 1936–37
- Champions: Jeunesse Esch (2nd title)
- Matches: 96
- Goals: 449 (4.68 per match)
- Highest scoring: US Dudelange 13–1 FC Aris Bonnevoie

The 1936–37 Luxembourg National Division was the 27th season of top level association football in Luxembourg.

== Overview ==
It was contested by 10 teams, and Jeunesse Esch won the championship.

== League standings ==
Pos	Team	Pld	W	D	L	GF	GA	GD	Pts
1	Jeunesse Esch	18	12	2	4	44	20	+24	26
2	FC Progrès Niedercorn	18	12	2	4	57	19	+38	26
3	US Dudelange	18	11	4	3	55	22	+33	26
4	Stade Dudelange	18	11	2	5	57	33	+24	24
5	FA Red Boys Differdange	18	10	1	7	50	47	+3	21
6	CA Spora Luxembourg	18	9	2	7	47	29	+18	20
7	CS Fola Esch	18	8	1	9	37	37	0	17
8	Union Luxembourg	18	5	4	9	37	56	−19	14
9	FC Red Black Pfaffenthal	18	1	2	15	22	61	−39	4
10	FC Aris Bonnevoie	18	1	0	17	21	103	−82	2

Source: rsssf.com

== Results ==
Home \ Away	ARI	USD	FOL	JEU	PRO	RBP	RBD	SPO	STD	UNI
Aris Bonnevoie		1–3	0–5	1–3	2–4	4–1	4–5	1–7	0–12	1–4
US Dudelange	13–1		8–1	1–1	0–0	2–1	3–1	1–0	2–2	3–3
Fola Esch	6–0	1–3		0–2	1–0	3–2	2–3	3–2	3–1	6–1
Jeunesse Esch	11–0	2–1	1–0		0–1	2–1	0–3	2–1	5–1	3–2
Progrès Niederkorn	11–0	1–2	3–1	0–2		6–0	4–1	2–2	4–2	9–0
Red Black Pfaffenthal	4–2	0–6	1–1	0–3	1–4		3–6	3–5	1–2	2–2
Red Boys Differdange	5–2	1–4	1–3	2–1	0–3	5–1		3–1	1–4	3–1
Spora Luxembourg	5–0	3–0	2–0	1–3	0–2	2–0	6–4		0–1	2–2
Stade Dudelange	2–1	0–2	3–0	2–0	5–1	4–0	3–3	1–5		5–2
Union Luxembourg	2–1	3–1	4–1	3–3	0–2	2–1	2–3	1–3	3–7	

Legend: Blue = home team win; Yellow = draw; Red = away team win.

== 1st playoff ==
Team 1	Score	Team 2
FC Progrès Niedercorn	0–1	US Dudelange
Jeunesse Esch	0–3	FC Progrès Niedercorn
US Dudelange	0–4	Jeunesse Esch

== 2nd playoff ==
Team 1	Score	Team 2
Jeunesse Esch	4–2	FC Progrès Niedercorn
US Dudelange	0–5	Jeunesse Esch
FC Progrès Niedercorn	2–1	US Dudelange
