= 1938–39 Luxembourg National Division =

Luxembourg National Division
- Season: 1938–39
- Champions: Stade Dudelange (1st title)
- Matches: 90
- Goals: 460 (5.11 per match)
- Highest scoring: CS Fola Esch 3–9 US Dudelange

The 1938–39 Luxembourg National Division was the 29th season of top level association football in Luxembourg.

== Overview ==
It was contested by 10 teams, and Stade Dudelange won the championship.

== League standings ==
Pos	Team	Pld	W	D	L	GF	GA	GD	Pts
1	Stade Dudelange	18	14	3	1	62	25	+37	31
2	US Dudelange	18	13	2	3	74	24	+50	28
3	CA Spora Luxembourg	18	10	3	5	57	31	+26	23
4	Jeunesse Esch	18	9	1	8	52	41	+11	19
5	FC Progrès Niedercorn	18	8	3	7	48	41	+7	19
6	Union Luxembourg	18	8	2	8	39	44	−5	18
7	Chiers Rodange	18	4	4	10	28	60	−32	12
8	National Schifflange	18	4	3	11	37	52	−15	11
9	CS Fola Esch	18	5	0	13	31	63	−32	10
10	FC Avenir Beggen	18	4	1	13	32	79	−47	9

Source: rsssf.com

== Results ==
Home \ Away	AVE	CHI	USD	FOL	JEU	NAT	PRO	SPO	STD	UNI
Avenir Beggen		3–4	1–4	3–0	5–2	3–0	2–5	0–9	1–8	3–2
Chiers Rodange	1–1		0–8	2–1	2–2	3–2	1–6	0–0	2–4	0–4
US Dudelange	6–0	6–0		7–1	5–1	7–1	4–1	3–2	0–0	4–0
Fola Esch	4–1	1–0	3–9		1–2	2–1	5–1	3–0	2–4	0–2
Jeunesse Esch	7–2	7–1	5–1	7–1		1–0	2–3	4–0	1–4	3–1
National Schifflange	2–1	4–4	1–3	3–2	1–4		2–2	2–3	2–3	7–0
Progrès Niederkorn	5–3	2–1	3–4	2–1	4–1	5–1		1–3	2–3	2–3
Spora Luxembourg	9–2	3–1	2–1	7–1	4–1	2–3	2–2		4–2	1–2
Stade Dudelange	5–0	5–1	0–0	9–1	2–1	4–2	2–1	2–2		2–1
Union Luxembourg	6–1	1–5	3–2	3–2	4–1	3–3	1–1	1–4	2–3	

Legend: Blue = home team win; Yellow = draw; Red = away team win.
