= 1922–23 Luxembourg National Division =

Luxembourg National Division
- Season: 1922–23
- Champions: FA Red Boys Differdange (1st title)
- Matches: 56
- Goals: 260 (4.64 per match)
- Highest scoring: CS Fola Esch 10–3 Union Luxembourg

The 1922–23 Luxembourg National Division was the 13th season of top level association football in Luxembourg.

== Overview ==
It was contested by 8 teams, and FA Red Boys Differdange won the championship.

== League standings ==
Pos	Team	Pld	W	D	L	GF	GA	GD	Pts
1	FA Red Boys Differdange	14	10	3	1	52	20	+32	23
2	Stade Dudelange	14	9	4	1	36	17	+19	22
3	CS Fola Esch	14	7	2	5	44	27	+17	16
4	Jeunesse Esch	14	6	2	6	32	36	−4	14
5	Union Luxembourg	14	6	2	6	29	41	−12	14
6	Sporting Club Luxembourg	14	5	2	7	26	35	−9	12
7	Racing Club Luxembourg	14	4	3	7	31	27	+4	11
8	SC Tétange	14	0	0	14	10	57	−47	0

Source: rsssf.com

== Results ==
Home \ Away	FOL	JEU	RAC	RBD	SCL	STD	TÉT	UNI
Fola Esch		6–3	2–2	3–4	0–1	3–4	4–0	10–3
Jeunesse Esch	2–3		1–0	3–5	4–2	1–3	2–0	3–0
Racing Club Luxembourg	0–2	5–1		2–2	2–0	1–4	6–0	3–3
Red Boys Differdange	1–4	3–1	5–0		4–0	1–1	6–1	5–1
SC Luxembourg	3–2	3–3	1–0	1–7		2–2	6–0	2–3
Stade Dudelange	2–1	1–1	3–1	2–2	3–1		2–1	6–1
Tétange	1–3	3–4	1–8	0–3	1–3	0–3		1–2
Union Luxembourg	1–1	2–3	2–1	1–4	4–1	1–0	5–1	

Legend: Blue = home team win; Yellow = draw; Red = away team win.
