= 1949–50 Luxembourg National Division =

Luxembourg National Division
- Season: 1949–50
- Champions: Stade Dudelange (7th title)
- Matches: 132
- Goals: 462 (3.5 per match)
- Highest scoring: US Dudelange 2–9 Stade Dudelange

The 1949–50 Luxembourg National Division was the 36th season of top level association football in Luxembourg.

== Overview ==
It was performed in 12 teams, and Stade Dudelange won the championship.

== League standings ==
Pos	Team	Pld	W	D	L	GF	GA	GD	Pts
1	Stade Dudelange	22	15	5	2	63	21	+42	35
2	National Schifflange	22	15	4	3	46	21	+25	34
3	CA Spora Luxembourg	22	10	5	7	50	38	+12	25
4	FA Red Boys Differdange	22	9	5	8	36	33	+3	23
5	Jeunesse Esch	22	8	6	8	27	29	−2	22
6	Union Luxembourg	22	8	6	8	36	38	−2	22
7	US Dudelange	22	9	4	9	46	56	−10	22
8	FC Progrès Niedercorn	22	7	6	9	47	45	+2	20
9	SC Tétange	22	8	4	10	34	37	−3	20
10	CS Fola Esch	22	6	7	9	32	42	−10	19
11	US Rumelange	22	4	5	13	21	49	−28	13
12	CS Grevenmacher	22	3	3	16	24	53	−29	9

Source: rsssf.com

== Results ==
Home \ Away	USD	FOL	GRE	JEU	NAT	PRO	RBD	RUM	SPO	STD	TÉT	UNI
US Dudelange		2–0	4–3	2–1	3–6	4–2	0–0	2–0	2–3	2–9	1–2	4–3
Fola Esch	4–4		4–2	1–1	1–2	1–5	0–4	3–0	0–0	0–1	3–1	0–0
Grevenmacher	1–2	1–1		1–1	0–2	1–3	0–4	1–0	1–2	0–1	1–4	2–1
Jeunesse Esch	1–2	0–3	1–0		1–3	2–1	0–3	2–0	2–1	3–2	5–0	0–1
National Schifflange	3–2	2–2	7–0	1–2		1–0	3–0	2–0	2–1	0–1	2–1	3–2
Progrès Niederkorn	5–2	3–1	1–3	1–1	2–3		6–2	3–3	0–2	2–2	2–0	2–3
Red Boys Differdange	2–0	1–1	2–1	0–0	0–0	4–2		1–0	2–1	0–0	0–1	3–1
Rumelange	2–2	1–0	2–1	1–2	0–0	2–2	3–2		0–4	2–1	0–2	0–4
Spora Luxembourg	2–4	3–0	5–2	2–2	1–2	2–2	5–4	4–2		2–2	5–1	3–1
Stade Dudelange	3–0	8–2	2–0	3–0	1–0	5–1	3–0	6–0	3–0		3–1	3–3
Tétange	1–1	1–2	3–3	0–0	0–1	0–0	4–1	3–1	2–0	2–3		3–0
Union Luxembourg	3–1	0–3	1–0	1–0	1–1	1–2	2–1	2–2	2–2	1–1	3–2	

Legend: Blue = home team win; Yellow = draw; Red = away team win.
