= 1967–68 Luxembourg National Division =

Luxembourg National Division
- Season: 1967–68
- Champions: Jeunesse Esch (10th title)
- Matches: 132
- Goals: 459 (3.48 per match)
- Highest scoring: US Mondorf 5–5 Union Luxembourg

The 1967–68 Luxembourg National Division was the 54th season of top level association football in Luxembourg.

== Overview ==
It was performed in 12 teams, and Jeunesse Esch won the championship.

== League standings ==
Pos	Team	Pld	W	D	L	GF	GA	GD	Pts
1	Jeunesse Esch	22	16	3	3	41	17	+24	35
2	US Rumelange	22	13	5	4	50	29	+21	31
3	Union Luxembourg	22	11	6	5	64	36	+28	28
4	FC Aris Bonnevoie	22	11	4	7	42	22	+20	26
5	US Dudelange	22	10	6	6	39	37	+2	26
6	CA Spora Luxembourg	22	10	5	7	35	26	+9	25
7	FC Avenir Beggen	22	8	5	9	34	32	+2	21
8	FA Red Boys Differdange	22	7	3	12	40	46	−6	17
9	US Mondorf	22	7	3	12	42	61	−19	17
10	FC Progrès Niedercorn	22	6	4	12	35	46	−11	16
11	Stade Dudelange	22	6	4	12	21	44	−23	16
12	CS Pétange	22	1	4	17	16	63	−47	6

Source: rsssf.com

== Results ==
Home \ Away	ARI	AVE	USD	JEU	MON	PÉT	PRO	RBD	RUM	SPO	STD	UNI
Aris Bonnevoie		2–1	1–3	2–2	1–2	4–0	2–0	2–0	0–3	0–1	6–0	0–2
Avenir Beggen	2–1		4–0	2–4	3–3	1–0	2–0	3–0	2–4	0–0	1–2	0–1
US Dudelange	2–2	1–1		2–2	4–2	4–3	1–1	5–3	0–1	2–1	0–1	3–0
Jeunesse Esch	0–2	3–1	4–0		3–0	2–1	2–0	1–0	1–1	1–0	1–2	1–0
Mondorf	0–3	2–4	1–1	0–2		4–0	2–1	0–1	4–2	0–6	4–0	5–5
Pétange	0–2	0–2	0–2	1–4	1–4		0–0	0–5	0–0	2–2	1–3	0–9
Progrès Niederkorn	0–2	1–0	2–3	0–2	5–2	1–2		3–2	2–4	2–0	4–2	3–3
Red Boys Differdange	0–4	2–2	5–1	1–2	0–3	4–1	1–3		4–1	2–4	1–1	1–3
Rumelange	2–0	1–0	2–2	1–0	7–2	5–2	3–0	1–1		2–0	3–1	3–2
Spora Luxembourg	1–1	1–1	1–0	0–1	2–1	3–1	3–0	1–2	2–1		2–0	3–3
Stade Dudelange	0–4	0–1	0–2	0–1	4–1	0–0	4–3	0–3	0–0	0–1		0–4
Union Luxembourg	1–1	4–1	0–1	1–2	6–0	2–1	4–4	5–2	4–3	4–1	1–1	

Legend: Blue = home team win; Yellow = draw; Red = away team win.
