= 1944–45 Luxembourg National Division =

Luxembourg National Division
- Season: 1944–45
- Champions: Stade Dudelange (3rd title)
- Matches: 6
- Goals: 35 (5.83 per match)
- Biggest home win: Stade Dudelange 7–1 FA Red Boys Differdange
- Biggest away win: FA Red Boys Differdange 2–3 CA Spora Luxembourg
- Highest scoring: Stade Dudelange 7–1 FA Red Boys Differdange
- Longest winning run: 3 matches Stade Dudelange
- Longest unbeaten run: 3 matches Stade Dudelange
- Longest winless run: 2 matches FA Red Boys Differdange
- Longest losing run: 2 matches FA Red Boys Differdange

The 1944–45 Luxembourg National Division was the 31st season of top level association football in Luxembourg.

== Quarter-final ==
Team 1	Score	Team 2
Stade Dudelange	3–1	Jeunesse Esch
FA Red Boys Differdange	2–3	CA Spora Luxembourg
National Schifflange	5–2	FC Avenir Beggen

== Semi-final ==
Team 1	Score	Team 2
Stade Dudelange	7–1	FA Red Boys Differdange
CA Spora Luxembourg	3–2	National Schifflange

== Final ==
Team 1	Score	Team 2
Stade Dudelange	6–0	CA Spora Luxembourg
