= 1966–67 Luxembourg National Division =

Luxembourg National Division
- Season: 1966–67
- Champions: Jeunesse Esch (9th title)
- Matches: 132
- Goals: 481 (3.64 per match)
- Highest scoring: Jeunesse Wasserbillig 6–4 Stade Dudelange; Avenir Beggen 7–3 CS Pétange

The 1966–67 Luxembourg National Division was the 53rd season of top level association football in Luxembourg. The competition was contested by 12 teams with Jeunesse Esch winning the championship.

== League standings ==
Pos	Team	Pld	W	D	L	GF	GA	GD	Pts
1	Jeunesse Esch	22	16	4	2	55	20	+35	36
2	CA Spora Luxembourg	22	13	4	5	40	23	+17	30
3	Union Luxembourg	22	12	3	7	57	31	+26	27
4	FC Aris Bonnevoie	22	10	6	6	48	29	+19	26
5	US Dudelange	22	12	1	9	50	41	+9	25
6	US Mondorf	22	9	4	9	38	47	−9	22
7	US Rumelange	22	8	5	9	32	30	+2	21
8	FC Avenir Beggen	22	8	2	12	46	46	0	18
9	CS Pétange	22	7	4	11	33	50	−17	18
10	Stade Dudelange	22	6	3	13	31	49	−18	15
11	Jeunesse Wasserbillig	22	5	3	14	30	59	−29	13
12	Rapid Neudorf	22	4	5	13	21	56	−35	13

Source: rsssf.com

== Results ==
Home \ Away	ARI	AVE	USD	JEU	MON	PÉT	RAP	RUM	SPO	STD	UNI	WAS
Aris Bonnevoie		2–1	1–2	3–0	4–1	3–0	5–0	4–2	0–0	1–1	4–0	4–0
Avenir Beggen	4–3		3–4	0–2	5–0	7–3	3–1	0–0	1–2	5–1	0–2	5–1
US Dudelange	3–1	1–3		1–3	1–3	1–2	4–0	1–1	1–0	3–1	3–1	4–2
Jeunesse Esch	2–0	1–1	4–0		6–2	4–0	3–1	4–2	3–0	5–2	1–1	2–0
Mondorf	2–2	2–0	1–0	1–1		2–4	4–1	2–1	0–4	2–0	1–0	4–0
Pétange	0–0	2–1	2–5	1–4	1–3		3–1	1–1	2–3	1–3	1–5	0–0
Rapid Neudorf	0–4	1–0	0–4	0–1	2–2	2–2		1–0	2–0	0–0	0–1	3–1
Rumelange	0–0	3–0	0–1	1–4	2–0	1–0	6–2		2–1	4–0	1–1	2–0
Spora Luxembourg	2–1	1–3	3–1	0–0	5–1	1–0	2–2	4–1		2–0	2–1	3–0
Stade Dudelange	6–1	2–1	4–2	0–1	2–1	0–2	1–1	3–1	0–2		0–3	0–1
Union Luxembourg	1–1	6–1	4–2	2–1	5–3	2–4	8–1	0–1	1–2	4–1		2–1
Jeunesse Wasserbillig	2–4	6–2	2–6	2–3	1–1	1–2	2–0	1–0	1–1	6–4	0–7	

Legend: Blue = home team win; Yellow = draw; Red = away team win.
