= 1955–56 Luxembourg National Division =

Luxembourg National Division
- Season: 1955–56
- Champions: CA Spora Luxembourg (9th title)
- Matches: 132
- Goals: 543 (4.11 per match)
- Highest scoring: FC Red Star Merl-Belair 4–8 CA Spora Luxembourg; CS Fola Esch 7–5 Racing Rodange

The 1955–56 Luxembourg National Division was the 42nd season of top level association football in Luxembourg.

== Overview ==
It was performed in 12 teams, and CA Spora Luxembourg won the championship.

== League standings ==
Pos	Team	Pld	W	D	L	GF	GA	GD	Pts	Qualification or relegation
1	CA Spora Luxembourg (C)	22	16	1	5	61	38	+23	33	Qualification for the European Cup preliminary round
2	Stade Dudelange	22	16	0	6	61	23	+38	32	
3	FC Progrès Niedercorn	22	12	6	4	66	40	+26	30	
4	Alliance Dudelange	22	12	5	5	51	41	+10	29	
5	Jeunesse Esch	22	8	7	7	35	32	+3	23	
6	CS Fola Esch	22	10	3	9	57	58	−1	23	
7	National Schifflange	22	9	3	10	37	44	−7	21	
8	FA Red Boys Differdange	22	8	4	10	33	39	−6	20	
9	Union Luxembourg	22	7	5	10	42	44	−2	19	
10	FC Red Star Merl-Belair	22	3	8	11	38	68	−30	14	
11	Racing Rodange	22	3	5	14	33	53	−20	11	
12	Chiers Rodange	22	3	3	16	29	63	−34	9	

Source: rsssf.com
(C) Champions

== Results ==
Home \ Away	ALD	CHI	FOL	JEU	NAT	PRO	RAC	RBD	RSM	SPO	STD	UNI
Alliance Dudelange		3–1	3–2	1–1	2–2	3–3	1–2	1–0	7–1	2–3	1–0	2–2
Chiers Rodange	2–3		1–4	2–3	1–2	3–3	1–1	1–3	2–2	1–4	0–2	3–1
Fola Esch	4–5	3–1		0–4	1–1	2–2	7–5	0–2	4–1	2–8	5–1	3–4
Jeunesse Esch	1–2	5–1	0–1		3–1	3–3	3–2	0–0	1–0	0–2	2–1	2–2
National Schifflange	1–2	2–1	2–4	0–0		1–3	1–0	4–2	7–2	3–0	0–4	2–1
Progrès Niederkorn	1–3	8–0	3–1	3–2	3–1		6–2	1–1	4–2	1–2	2–0	4–0
Racing Rodange	0–3	0–1	2–4	4–1	0–2	3–4		0–3	0–0	2–3	1–3	2–2
Red Boys Differdange	2–0	2–0	1–2	0–2	0–2	1–3	1–1		5–2	1–3	2–4	3–2
Red Star Merl-Belair	0–2	3–2	2–2	1–1	5–1	3–3	2–2	1–1		4–8	0–4	4–2
Spora Luxembourg	2–2	2–1	1–5	3–0	2–0	3–2	3–2	2–0	5–1		1–2	2–3
Stade Dudelange	6–1	5–1	5–0	3–1	5–2	3–2	0–1	6–0	3–0	3–0		1–0
Union Luxembourg	5–2	2–3	4–1	0–0	3–0	1–2	2–1	2–3	2–2	1–2	1–0	

Legend: Blue = home team win; Yellow = draw; Red = away team win.
