= 1997–98 Luxembourg National Division =

Luxembourg National Division
- Season: 1997–98
- Champions: Jeunesse Esch (25th titles)
- Relegated: Red Boys Differdange; Rumelange
- Champions League: Jeunesse Esch
- UEFA Cup: Union Luxembourg
- Cup Winners' Cup: Grevenmacher
- Intertoto Cup: Sporting Mertzig

The 1997–98 Luxembourg National Division was the 84th season of top level association football in Luxembourg.

== Overview ==
It was performed in 12 teams, and Jeunesse Esch won the championship.

== League standings ==
Pos	Team	Pld	W	D	L	GF	GA	GD	Pts	Qualification or relegation
1	Jeunesse Esch (C)	22	17	3	2	69	19	+50	54	Qualification to Champions League first qualifying round
2	Union Luxembourg	22	17	2	3	67	21	+46	53	Qualification to UEFA Cup first qualifying round
3	Grevenmacher	22	13	4	5	49	23	+26	43	Qualification to Cup Winners' Cup qualifying round
4	F91 Dudelange	22	10	6	6	44	32	+12	36	
5	Avenir Beggen	22	10	5	7	41	35	+6	35	
6	Hobscheid	22	8	7	7	38	35	+3	31	
7	Sporting Mertzig	22	8	6	8	44	41	+3	30	Qualification to Intertoto Cup first round
8	Wiltz 71	22	6	7	9	38	45	−7	25	
9	Pétange	22	5	5	12	33	53	−20	20	
10	Spora Luxembourg	22	5	4	13	31	55	−24	19	
11	Rumelange (R)	22	4	4	14	25	74	−49	16	Relegation to Luxembourg Division of Honour
12	Red Boys Differdange (R)	22	0	5	17	15	61	−46	5	Relegation to Luxembourg Division of Honour

Source: rsssf.com
(C) Champions; (R) Relegated

== Results ==
Home \ Away	AVE	DUD	GRE	HOB	JEU	PÉT	RBD	RUM	SPO	MER	UNI	WIL
Avenir Beggen		1–2	2–5	3–1	0–2	3–1	2–0	4–0	3–3	1–3	0–4	1–1
F91 Dudelange	5–1		0–2	1–3	2–5	3–1	4–0	0–0	6–2	1–0	1–1	2–1
Grevenmacher	0–3	1–1		3–3	3–2	2–0	4–0	5–1	1–1	0–1	1–0	6–1
Hobscheid	0–0	4–2	0–2		1–0	1–1	2–2	6–1	3–0	3–3	1–3	2–1
Jeunesse Esch	2–0	3–1	1–0	1–0		4–0	4–0	9–0	1–0	2–2	2–1	5–1
Pétange	1–1	2–5	3–2	2–0	0–5		3–2	2–3	5–0	1–3	1–6	2–2
Red Boys Differdange	0–3	1–3	1–5	1–1	0–2	0–1		0–2	2–2	2–2	0–5	1–2
Rumelange	0–4	0–0	0–2	1–3	1–5	2–2	4–2		2–0	0–1	2–5	3–3
Spora Luxembourg	3–4	1–1	0–2	0–2	1–5	3–1	1–0	7–1		2–0	1–2	2–1
Sporting Mertzig	1–3	1–1	0–1	1–1	2–5	2–2	5–1	6–1	5–1		1–3	3–1
Union Luxembourg	1–2	2–0	2–1	5–0	2–2	2–0	3–0	5–0	4–0	4–1		3–1
Wiltz 71	0–0	0–3	1–1	2–1	2–2	2–1	1–1	3–1	3–1	6–1	2–3	

Legend: Blue = home team win; Yellow = draw; Red = away team win.
