= 1971–72 Luxembourg National Division =

Luxembourg National Division
- Season: 1971–72

The 1971–72 Luxembourg National Division was the 58th season of top level association football in Luxembourg.

== Overview ==
The participants were 12 teams, and FC Aris Bonnevoie won the championship.

== League standings ==
Pos	Team	Pld	W	D	L	GF	GA	GD	Pts
1	FC Aris Bonnevoie	22	14	3	5	59	20	+39	31
2	US Rumelange	22	13	4	5	44	34	+10	30
3	FA Red Boys Differdange	22	10	6	6	51	39	+12	26
4	Jeunesse Esch	22	12	2	8	44	34	+10	26
5	FC Avenir Beggen	22	11	3	8	40	33	+7	25
6	FC Etzella Ettelbruck	22	6	8	8	40	38	+2	20
7	CA Spora Luxembourg	22	8	4	10	35	37	−2	20
8	National Schifflange	22	6	7	9	30	36	−6	19
9	SC Tétange	22	6	7	9	25	36	−11	19
10	Union Luxembourg	22	8	2	12	29	35	−6	18
11	FC Progrès Niedercorn	22	4	7	11	29	50	−21	15
12	Alliance Dudelange	22	5	5	12	25	59	−34	15

Source: rsssf.com

== Results ==
Home \ Away	ALD	ARI	AVE	ETZ	JEU	NAT	PRO	RBD	RUM	SPO	TÉT	UNI
Alliance Dudelange		0–5	1–2	4–4	2–1	4–1	1–1	5–2	1–3	0–1	1–1	0–2
Aris Bonnevoie	6–1		5–2	3–0	1–2	1–2	3–1	0–0	6–0	7–1	0–0	3–0
Avenir Beggen	0–1	0–0		0–0	1–2	0–0	3–2	4–1	1–2	3–2	3–1	3–1
Etzella Ettelbruck	7–0	3–0	1–2		1–1	4–1	2–2	3–1	2–2	3–0	3–3	0–3
Jeunesse Esch	3–0	1–3	0–4	6–0		4–1	5–2	1–4	2–2	0–3	2–1	1–0
National Schifflange	1–1	1–5	3–0	1–1	0–1		1–3	0–1	2–2	2–2	4–0	2–0
Progrès Niederkorn	0–1	0–5	1–4	0–0	0–3	2–1		3–1	2–2	1–1	0–2	1–3
Red Boys Differdange	7–1	3–1	5–2	2–1	3–2	1–1	1–1		1–3	2–1	2–2	2–2
Rumelange	3–0	3–0	0–2	2–1	2–1	1–0	5–1	2–5		0–2	2–1	0–1
Spora Luxembourg	5–0	0–2	3–1	0–2	0–1	1–2	3–1	2–2	2–5		1–1	2–0
Tétange	0–0	0–1	2–1	1–0	2–1	1–3	3–3	2–1	1–2	0–2		1–0
Union Luxembourg	4–1	0–2	0–2	4–2	2–4	1–1	0–2	0–4	0–1	2–1	4–0	

Legend: Blue = home team win; Yellow = draw; Red = away team win.
