= 1977–78 Luxembourg National Division =

Luxembourg National Division
- Season: 1977–78

The 1977–78 Luxembourg National Division was the 64th season of top level association football in Luxembourg.

== Overview ==
It was performed in 12 teams, and FC Progrès Niedercorn won the championship.

== League standings ==
Pos	Team	Pld	W	D	L	GF	GA	GD	Pts
1	FC Progrès Niedercorn	22	13	6	3	55	33	+22	32
2	Jeunesse Esch	22	10	6	6	45	31	+14	26
3	FA Red Boys Differdange	22	9	7	6	50	33	+17	25
4	FC Etzella Ettelbruck	22	8	7	7	48	43	+5	23
5	Chiers Rodange	22	8	6	8	35	35	0	22
6	Union Luxembourg	22	7	7	8	35	43	−8	21
7	US Rumelange	22	9	3	10	30	44	−14	21
8	Alliance Dudelange	22	7	6	9	34	48	−14	20
9	FC Avenir Beggen	22	7	5	10	31	35	−4	19
10	CS Grevenmacher	22	5	9	8	28	37	−9	19
11	CA Spora Luxembourg	22	6	6	10	49	47	+2	18
12	Stade Dudelange	22	7	4	11	34	45	−11	18

Source: rsssf.com

== Results ==
Home \ Away	AVE	ALD	CHI	ETZ	GRE	JEU	PRO	RBD	RUM	SPO	STD	UNI
Avenir Beggen		1–1	1–4	1–1	3–0	0–1	1–2	0–3	4–0	3–2	4–1	1–1
Alliance Dudelange	2–3		1–1	5–4	0–1	3–1	1–5	2–1	2–1	1–5	1–1	1–1
Chiers Rodange	5–1	1–5		0–0	1–3	3–0	1–1	1–5	2–0	0–1	4–1	0–0
Etzella Ettelbruck	0–1	3–0	3–3		2–3	2–0	3–1	2–1	3–1	1–1	3–2	3–5
Grevenmacher	0–0	1–1	1–0	3–3		1–1	0–2	1–1	2–2	1–2	2–1	1–1
Jeunesse Esch	2–1	4–2	5–1	1–1	1–1		1–2	1–0	4–1	3–1	7–2	3–3
Progrès Niederkorn	3–1	4–1	1–1	5–4	2–1	0–3		4–4	6–0	2–0	3–1	2–0
Red Boys Differdange	1–2	2–0	3–0	3–1	3–2	2–2	0–0		1–2	3–3	1–1	6–2
Rumelange	1–0	0–1	0–2	2–2	4–2	1–0	2–2	2–1		4–0	1–0	0–2
Spora Luxembourg	1–1	7–2	0–2	1–3	0–0	2–4	3–3	1–2	7–3		2–3	2–3
Stade Dudelange	1–0	0–1	2–1	2–1	4–1	2–1	3–4	2–2	1–2	2–2		1–0
Union Luxembourg	3–2	1–1	1–2	2–3	3–1	0–0	2–1	2–5	0–1	1–6	2–1	

Legend: Blue = home team win; Yellow = draw; Red = away team win.
