= 1964–65 Luxembourg National Division =

Luxembourg National Division
- Season: 1964–65
- Champions: Stade Dudelange (10th title)
- Matches: 132
- Goals: 415 (3.14 per match)
- Highest scoring: Rapid Neudorf 4–4 FC Aris Bonnevoie; Rapid Neudorf 3–5 Stade Dudelange; Rapid Neudorf 3–5 Union Luxembourg; Union Luxembourg 5–3 Jeunesse Wasserbillig; National Schifflange 0–8 Jeunesse Esch

The 1964–65 Luxembourg National Division was the 51st season of top level association football in Luxembourg. Aris Bonnevoie went into the season as defending champions, having won their first title the previous season.

== Overview ==
It consisted of 12 teams, and Stade Dudelange won the championship by a margin of just a single point.

== League standings ==
| Pos | Team | Pld | W | D | L | GF | GA | GD | Pts |
|---|---|---|---|---|---|---|---|---|---|
| 1 | Stade Dudelange | 22 | 13 | 6 | 3 | 44 | 28 | +16 | 32 |
| 2 | Union Luxembourg | 22 | 12 | 7 | 3 | 47 | 25 | +22 | 31 |
| 3 | Jeunesse Esch | 22 | 11 | 6 | 5 | 44 | 28 | +16 | 28 |
| 4 | FC Aris Bonnevoie | 22 | 12 | 4 | 6 | 44 | 34 | +10 | 28 |
| 5 | CA Spora Luxembourg | 22 | 9 | 7 | 6 | 37 | 30 | +7 | 25 |
| 6 | Alliance Dudelange | 22 | 7 | 7 | 8 | 35 | 32 | +3 | 21 |
| 7 | FA Red Boys Differdange | 22 | 8 | 4 | 10 | 25 | 28 | −3 | 20 |
| 8 | Jeunesse Wasserbillig | 22 | 6 | 6 | 10 | 27 | 39 | −12 | 18 |
| 9 | US Rumelange | 22 | 7 | 3 | 12 | 27 | 31 | −4 | 17 |
| 10 | US Dudelange | 22 | 3 | 11 | 8 | 25 | 31 | −6 | 17 |
| 11 | Rapid Neudorf | 22 | 7 | 2 | 13 | 36 | 54 | −18 | 16 |
| 12 | National Schifflange | 22 | 3 | 5 | 14 | 24 | 55 | −31 | 11 |

Source: rsssf.com

== Results ==
| Home \ Away | ALD | ARI | USD | JEU | NAT | RAP | RBD | RUM | SPO | STD | UNI | WAS |
|---|---|---|---|---|---|---|---|---|---|---|---|---|
| Alliance Dudelange | | 2–3 | 3–1 | 3–2 | 1–2 | 2–0 | 1–0 | 3–2 | 1–1 | 2–2 | 1–1 | 1–1 |
| Aris Bonnevoie | 1–0 | | 2–1 | 2–2 | 2–1 | 3–0 | 4–1 | 2–1 | 5–2 | 0–1 | 1–1 | 3–1 |
| US Dudelange | 1–1 | 1–3 | | 0–0 | 0–0 | 4–1 | 2–0 | 1–1 | 2–2 | 1–2 | 0–2 | 2–0 |
| Jeunesse Esch | 2–0 | 2–1 | 3–1 | | 4–2 | 1–4 | 1–1 | 1–0 | 1–1 | 1–1 | 3–0 | 2–0 |
| National Schifflange | 1–6 | 2–3 | 2–2 | 0–8 | | 1–2 | 0–3 | 0–2 | 1–3 | 1–5 | 1–2 | 1–1 |
| Rapid Neudorf | 3–2 | 4–4 | 1–0 | 1–4 | 1–1 | | 1–0 | 1–2 | 1–0 | 3–5 | 3–5 | 0–1 |
| Red Boys Differdange | 2–0 | 2–0 | 1–1 | 1–0 | 0–1 | 2–4 | | 1–0 | 2–1 | 0–1 | 0–4 | 4–1 |
| Rumelange | 0–1 | 4–1 | 0–0 | 2–0 | 1–4 | 4–0 | 1–2 | | 0–0 | 1–4 | 1–0 | 1–3 |
| Spora Luxembourg | 2–1 | 0–1 | 3–3 | 2–3 | 3–0 | 2–1 | 2–1 | 1–0 | | 2–0 | 1–1 | 5–1 |
| Stade Dudelange | 3–2 | 3–1 | 2–2 | 0–0 | 1–1 | 3–1 | 1–0 | 2–4 | 1–1 | | 2–0 | 1–0 |
| Union Luxembourg | 2–2 | 1–1 | 2–0 | 4–1 | 3–1 | 4–1 | 1–1 | 2–0 | 3–1 | 4–1 | | 5–3 |
| Jeunesse Wasserbillig | 0–0 | 2–1 | 0–0 | 2–3 | 2–1 | 4–3 | 1–1 | 2–0 | 1–2 | 1–3 | 0–0 | |

Legend: Blue = home team win; Yellow = draw; Red = away team win.
