= 1924–25 Luxembourg National Division =

Luxembourg National Division
- Season: 1924–25
- Champions: CA Spora Luxembourg (1st title)
- Matches: 56
- Goals: 236 (4.21 per match)
- Highest scoring: Stade Dudelange 10–0 US Dudelange

The 1924–25 Luxembourg National Division was the 15th season of top level association football in Luxembourg.

== Overview ==
It was contested by 8 teams. The individual results recorded suggest that Stade Dudelange should have won on goal average (42:14 to 41:14 when equal on 21 points with CA Spora Luxembourg). CA Spora Luxembourg won 2–0 at Home, and end up tie 2–2 Away. However, CA Spora Luxembourg are always recorded as having won the title.

== League standings ==
Pos	Team	Pld	W	D	L	GF	GA	GAv	Pts
1	Stade Dudelange	14	9	3	2	42	14	3.000	21
2	CA Spora Luxembourg	14	9	3	2	41	14	2.929	21
3	CS Fola Esch	14	6	5	3	35	20	1.750	17
4	Jeunesse Esch	14	7	3	4	31	18	1.722	17
5	FA Red Boys Differdange	14	7	2	5	36	27	1.333	16
6	Union Luxembourg	14	6	1	7	32	31	1.032	13
7	Progres Grund	14	3	1	10	15	49	0.306	7
8	US Dudelange	14	0	0	14	4	63	0.063	0

Source: rsssf.com

== Results ==
Home \ Away	USD	FOL	JEU	PRG	RBD	SPO	STD	UNI
US Dudelange		0–5	0–6	1–2	0–1	0–1	1–2	0–4
Fola Esch	3–0 (Note: Match awarded.)		1–1	7–2	3–3	2–0	3–0	1–1
Jeunesse Esch	7–0	1–0		3–0	3–0	3–3	0–2	3–2
Progres Grund	3–1	1–1	0–2		0–6	0–3	0–5	3–2
Red Boys Differdange	5–1	5–2	2–1	4–1		2–2	1–2	6–2
Spora Luxembourg	9–0	1–3	6–0	2–0	6–0		2–0	2–1
Stade Dudelange	10–0	2–2	1–1	7–0	1–0	2–2		4–2
Union Luxembourg	5–0	3–2	1–0	5–3	3–1	1–2	0–4	

Legend: Blue = home team win; Yellow = draw; Red = away team win.
