= 1927–28 Luxembourg National Division =

Luxembourg National Division
- Season: 1927–28
- Champions: CA Spora Luxembourg (2nd title)
- Matches: 56
- Goals: 277 (4.95 per match)
- Highest scoring: Union Luxembourg 4–7 Red Boys Differdange

The 1927–28 Luxembourg National Division was the 18th season of top level association football in Luxembourg.

== Overview ==
The competition contested by 8 teams, and CA Spora Luxembourg won the championship.

== League standings ==
Pos	Team	Pld	W	D	L	GF	GA	GD	Pts
1	CA Spora Luxembourg	14	11	2	1	53	20	+33	24
2	Stade Dudelange	14	8	0	6	34	27	+7	16
3	FA Red Boys Differdange	14	6	3	5	41	34	+7	15
4	FC Red Black Pfaffenthal	14	6	2	6	25	23	+2	14
5	Jeunesse Esch	14	6	2	6	37	44	−7	14
6	CS Fola Esch	14	4	5	5	33	38	−5	13
7	Progres Grund	14	5	1	8	29	44	−15	11
8	Union Luxembourg	14	1	3	10	25	47	−22	5

Source: rsssf.com

== Results ==
Home \ Away	FOL	JEU	PRG	RBP	RBD	SPO	STD	UNI
Fola Esch		4–6	6–2	1–1	1–1	2–7	2–1	1–1
Jeunesse Esch	4–4		5–2	2–1	2–4	4–4	2–1	4–1
Progres Grund	3–0 (Note: Match awarded.)	3–1		2–4	7–2	1–6	0–3	2–1
Red Black Pfaffenthal	1–3	5–1	2–1		3–2	0–3	2–0	3–0
Red Boys Differdange	2–3	5–1	4–0	1–1		1–1	6–1	4–1
Spora Luxembourg	3–2	4–0	7–2	2–0	4–2		4–2	4–1
Stade Dudelange	4–2	5–2	0–1	2–1	5–0	1–0		5–3
Union Luxembourg	2–2	1–3	3–3	3–1	4–7	2–4	2–4	

Legend: Blue = home team win; Yellow = draw; Red = away team win.
