= 1965–66 Luxembourg National Division =

Luxembourg National Division
- Season: 1965–66
- Champions: FC Aris Bonnevoie (2nd title)
- Matches: 132
- Goals: 514 (3.89 per match)
- Highest scoring: Alliance Dudelange 5–5 Stade Dudelange

The 1965–66 Luxembourg National Division was the 52nd season of top level association football in Luxembourg.

== Overview ==
It was performed in 12 teams, and FC Aris Bonnevoie won the championship.

== League standings ==
Pos	Team	Pld	W	D	L	GF	GA	GD	Pts
1	FC Aris Bonnevoie	22	15	5	2	67	25	+42	35
2	Union Luxembourg	22	13	2	7	58	33	+25	28
3	US Dudelange	22	11	6	5	58	39	+19	28
4	US Rumelange	22	11	3	8	38	35	+3	25
5	Jeunesse Esch	22	9	5	8	40	36	+4	23
6	FC Avenir Beggen	22	10	2	10	43	56	−13	22
7	CA Spora Luxembourg	22	6	8	8	38	35	+3	20
8	Stade Dudelange	22	8	3	11	34	49	−15	19
9	CS Pétange	22	7	5	10	32	49	−17	19
10	Jeunesse Wasserbillig	22	8	2	12	36	48	−12	18
11	FA Red Boys Differdange	22	8	1	13	38	44	−6	17
12	Alliance Dudelange	22	3	4	15	32	65	−33	10

Source: rsssf.com

== Results ==
Home \ Away	ALD	ARI	AVE	USD	JEU	PÉT	RBD	RUM	SPO	STD	UNI	WAS
Alliance Dudelange		1–3	1–2	0–5	1–2	0–0	3–1	3–4	2–2	5–5	2–6	3–2
Aris Bonnevoie	2–0		4–2	5–3	2–2	8–0	4–0	5–1	0–0	5–0	3–1	1–1
Avenir Beggen	3–2	1–3		1–1	2–1	4–0	2–2	2–0	2–3	4–0	1–3	3–0
US Dudelange	1–1	1–5	0–2		1–3	4–1	3–2	5–2	3–0	2–0	1–1	5–1
Jeunesse Esch	5–2	0–4	4–1	1–1		4–2	2–0	1–1	2–2	3–2	2–4	3–0
Pétange	3–1	2–6	6–2	3–2	2–0		1–0	0–2	2–2	0–1	1–3	4–1
Red Boys Differdange	1–2	4–0	8–1	2–7	2–1	0–1		1–0	3–1	2–0	1–3	1–3
Rumelange	2–0	0–0	0–3	2–3	1–0	5–1	1–0		4–3	1–2	2–2	2–0
Spora Luxembourg	7–0	2–2	1–3	1–1	1–1	1–1	0–2	0–1		2–0	1–2	3–0
Stade Dudelange	3–2	1–2	5–1	3–3	1–0	0–0	3–2	1–3	0–2		2–1	1–3
Union Luxembourg	4–0	3–0	6–0	1–2	3–1	1–0	2–3	3–1	2–3	5–2		1–3
Jeunesse Wasserbillig	2–1	0–3	6–1	2–4	1–2	2–2	4–1	0–3	2–1	1–2	2–1	

Legend: Blue = home team win; Yellow = draw; Red = away team win.
