= Luxembourg National Division =

Association football league in Luxembourg

- Founded: 1910
- Country: Luxembourg
- Confederation: UEFA
- Number of clubs: 16
- Level on pyramid: 1
- Relegation to: Division of Honour
- Domestic cup: Luxembourg Cup
- International cup(s): UEFA Champions League; UEFA Conference League
- Current champions: Atert Bissen (1st title) (2025–26)
- Most championships: Jeunesse Esch (28 titles)
- Current: 2026–27 Luxembourg National Division

The National Division (Luxembourgish: Nationaldivisioun, French: Division Nationale, German: Nationaldivision), known as the BGL Ligue for sponsorship reasons, is the highest football league in Luxembourg.

Between 2007 and 2009, it was known as the Fortis Ligue, after the Luxembourg Football Federation managed to seal a sponsorship deal with Fortis, however this was replaced by BGL after the financial crisis.

Before 2006, it contained twelve teams, but it expanded to fourteen for the 2006–07 season. Following the abandonment of the previous season, the 2020–21 season saw the further expansion of the league to 16 teams. The current champions are FC Atert Bissen.

The competition was first held in 1909–10, and has been held every year since, with the exceptions of 1912–13 and four seasons during the Second World War. It was also abandoned after 17 games in the 2019–20 season due to the COVID-19 pandemic.

The competition was called the Luxembourgish Championship (Luxembourgish: Lëtzebuerger Championnat, French: Championnat Luxembourgeois) until 1913–14. From the 1914–15 season until 1931–32 it was called the Premier Division (Luxembourgish: Éischt Divisioun, French: Première Division). It was then called the Division of Honour (Luxembourgish: Éirendivisioun, French: Division d'Honneur) from 1932–33 to 1956–57. Since the 1957–58 season, the competition has been known as the National Division.

== Clubs ==
Sixteen clubs are competing in the 2026–27 season – twelve from the previous season and four promoted from the Division of Honour.

| 2026–27 club | 2025–26 position | First season in top division | Seasons in top division | First season of current spell in top division (years) | Top division titles | Most recent top division title |
|---|---|---|---|---|---|---|
| Atert Bissen | 1st | 2025–26 | 2 | 2025–26 (2) | 1 | 2025–26 |
| Differdange 03 | 2nd | 2006–07 | 11 | 2006–07 (11) | 2 | 2024–25 |
| Etzella Ettelbruck | 2nd (DH) ▲ | 1971–72 | 32 | 2026–27 (1) | —N/a | |
| F91 Dudelange | 5th | 1992–93 | 35 | 1992–93 (35) | 16 | 2021–22 |
| Jeunesse Esch | 6th | 1909–10 | 104 | 1949–50 (78) | 28 | 2009–10 |
| Käerjéng 97 | 8th | 2005–06 | 15 | 2025–26 (2) | —N/a | |
| Mondorf-les-Bains | 3rd | 1966–67 | 17 | 2014–15 (13) | —N/a | |
| Progrès Niederkorn | 11th | 1926–27 | 72 | 2006–07 (21) | 3 | 1980–81 |
| Racing Union | 7th | 2005–06 | 21 | 2015–16 (12) | —N/a | |
| Résidence Walferdange | 4th (DH) ▲ | 2026–27 | 1 | 2026–27 (1) | —N/a | |
| Swift Hesperange | 12th | 1985–86 | 26 | 2021–22 (6) | 1 | 2022–23 |
| UNA Strassen | 4th | 2015–16 | 12 | 2015–16 (12) | —N/a | |
| US Hostert | 9th | 2011–12 | 11 | 2024–25 (3) | —N/a | |
| US Rumelange | 1st (DH) ▲ | 1909–10 | 42 | 2026–27 (1) | —N/a | |
| Victoria Rosport | 10th | 2002–03 | 9 | 2014–15 (13) | —N/a | |
| Wiltz 71 | 3rd (DH) ▲ | 1981–82 | 30 | 2026–27 (1) | —N/a | |

== Winners ==
The winners were (names in French):

| Year | Champions | Runners-up |
|---|---|---|
| 1909–10 | Racing Club Luxembourg | US Hollerich |
| 1910–11 | Sporting Club Luxembourg | Sporting Club Differdange |
| 1911–12 | US Hollerich | Sporting Club Luxembourg |
| 1912–13 | Not held | |
| 1913–14 | US Hollerich | Sporting Club Luxembourg |
| 1914–15 | US Hollerich | Jeunesse Esch |
| 1915–16 | US Hollerich | Sporting Club Luxembourg |
| 1916–17 | US Hollerich | Fola Esch |
| 1917–18 | Fola Esch | US Hollerich |
| 1918–19 | Sporting Club Luxembourg | Fola Esch |
| 1919–20 | Fola Esch | Stade Dudelange |
| 1920–21 | Jeunesse Esch | Fola Esch |
| 1921–22 | Fola Esch | Union Luxembourg |
| 1922–23 | Red Boys Differdange | Stade Dudelange |
| 1923–24 | Fola Esch | Spora Luxembourg |
| 1924–25 | Spora Luxembourg | Stade Dudelange |
| 1925–26 | Red Boys Differdange | Spora Luxembourg |
| 1926–27 | Union Luxembourg | Red Boys Differdange |
| 1927–28 | Spora Luxembourg | Stade Dudelange |
| 1928–29 | Spora Luxembourg | Fola Esch |
| 1929–30 | Fola Esch | Spora Luxembourg |
| 1930–31 | Red Boys Differdange | Spora Luxembourg |
| 1931–32 | Red Boys Differdange | Progrès Niederkorn |
| 1932–33 | Red Boys Differdange | Spora Luxembourg |
| 1933–34 | Spora Luxembourg | Red Boys Differdange |
| 1934–35 | Spora Luxembourg | Red Boys Differdange |
| 1935–36 | Spora Luxembourg | Jeunesse Esch |
| 1936–37 | Jeunesse Esch | Progrès Niederkorn |
| 1937–38 | Spora Luxembourg | Jeunesse Esch |
| 1938–39 | Stade Dudelange | US Dudelange |
| 1939–40 | Stade Dudelange | US Dudelange |
| 1941–1944 | Not held due to World War II. Also, the German government forced the teams from Luxembourg to play in the German championship. | |
| 1944–45 | Stade Dudelange | Spora Luxembourg |
| 1945–46 | Stade Dudelange | US Dudelange |
| 1946–47 | Stade Dudelange | US Dudelange |
| 1947–48 | Stade Dudelange | Union Luxembourg |
| 1948–49 | Spora Luxembourg | Fola Esch |
| 1949–50 | Stade Dudelange | National Schifflange |
| 1950–51 | Jeunesse Esch | National Schifflange |
| 1951–52 | National Schifflange | Spora Luxembourg |
| 1952–53 | Progrès Niederkorn | Jeunesse Esch |
| 1953–54 | Jeunesse Esch | Fola Esch |
| 1954–55 | Stade Dudelange | Fola Esch |
| 1955–56 | Spora Luxembourg | Stade Dudelange |
| 1956–57 | Stade Dudelange | Jeunesse Esch |
| 1957–58 | Jeunesse Esch | Red Boys Differdange |
| 1958–59 | Jeunesse Esch | Spora Luxembourg |
| 1959–60 | Jeunesse Esch | Stade Dudelange |
| 1960–61 | Spora Luxembourg | Jeunesse Esch |
| 1961–62 | Union Luxembourg | Alliance Dudelange |
| 1962–63 | Jeunesse Esch | Union Luxembourg |
| 1963–64 | Aris Bonnevoie | Union Luxembourg |
| 1964–65 | Stade Dudelange | Union Luxembourg |
| 1965–66 | Aris Bonnevoie | Union Luxembourg |
| 1966–67 | Jeunesse Esch | Spora Luxembourg |
| 1967–68 | Jeunesse Esch | US Rumelange |
| 1968–69 | Avenir Beggen | Jeunesse Esch |
| 1969–70 | Jeunesse Esch | US Rumelange |
| 1970–71 | Union Luxembourg | Aris Bonnevoie |
| 1971–72 | Aris Bonnevoie | US Rumelange |
| 1972–73 | Jeunesse Esch | Union Luxembourg |
| 1973–74 | Jeunesse Esch | Red Boys Differdange |
| 1974–75 | Jeunesse Esch | Avenir Beggen |
| 1975–76 | Jeunesse Esch | Red Boys Differdange |
| 1976–77 | Jeunesse Esch | Progrès Niederkorn |
| 1977–78 | Progrès Niederkorn | Jeunesse Esch |
| 1978–79 | Red Boys Differdange | Progrès Niederkorn |
| 1979–80 | Jeunesse Esch | Red Boys Differdange |
| 1980–81 | Progrès Niederkorn | Red Boys Differdange |
| 1981–82 | Avenir Beggen | Progrès Niederkorn |
| 1982–83 | Jeunesse Esch | Avenir Beggen |
| 1983–84 | Avenir Beggen | Red Boys Differdange |
| 1984–85 | Jeunesse Esch | Red Boys Differdange |
| 1985–86 | Avenir Beggen | Jeunesse Esch |
| 1986–87 | Jeunesse Esch | Avenir Beggen |
| 1987–88 | Jeunesse Esch | Spora Luxembourg |
| 1988–89 | Spora Luxembourg | Jeunesse Esch |
| 1989–90 | Union Luxembourg | Avenir Beggen |
| 1990–91 | Union Luxembourg | Jeunesse Esch |
| 1991–92 | Union Luxembourg | Avenir Beggen |
| 1992–93 | Avenir Beggen | Union Luxembourg |
| 1993–94 | Avenir Beggen | CS Grevenmacher |
| 1994–95 | Jeunesse Esch | CS Grevenmacher |
| 1995–96 | Jeunesse Esch | CS Grevenmacher |
| 1996–97 | Jeunesse Esch | CS Grevenmacher |
| 1997–98 | Jeunesse Esch | Union Luxembourg |
| 1998–99 | Jeunesse Esch | F91 Dudelange |
| 1999–2000 | F91 Dudelange | CS Grevenmacher |
| 2000–01 | F91 Dudelange | CS Grevenmacher |
| 2001–02 | F91 Dudelange | CS Grevenmacher |
| 2002–03 | CS Grevenmacher | F91 Dudelange |
| 2003–04 | Jeunesse Esch | F91 Dudelange |
| 2004–05 | F91 Dudelange | FC Etzella Ettelbruck |
| 2005–06 | F91 Dudelange | Jeunesse Esch |
| 2006–07 | F91 Dudelange | FC Etzella Ettelbruck |
| 2007–08 | F91 Dudelange | Racing FC Union Luxembourg |
| 2008–09 | F91 Dudelange | FC Differdange 03 |
| 2009–10 | Jeunesse Esch | F91 Dudelange |
| 2010–11 | F91 Dudelange | Fola Esch |
| 2011–12 | F91 Dudelange | Jeunesse Esch |
| 2012–13 | Fola Esch | F91 Dudelange |
| 2013–14 | F91 Dudelange | Fola Esch |
| 2014–15 | Fola Esch | FC Differdange 03 |
| 2015–16 | F91 Dudelange | Fola Esch |
| 2016–17 | F91 Dudelange | FC Differdange 03 |
| 2017–18 | F91 Dudelange | Progrès Niederkorn |
| 2018–19 | F91 Dudelange | Fola Esch |
| 2019–20 | Competition abandoned due to the COVID-19 pandemic | |
| 2020–21 | Fola Esch | F91 Dudelange |
| 2021–22 | F91 Dudelange | FC Differdange 03 |
| 2022–23 | Swift Hesperange | Progrès Niederkorn |
| 2023–24 | FC Differdange 03 | Swift Hesperange |
| 2024–25 | FC Differdange 03 | UNA Strassen |
| 2025–26 | FC Atert Bissen | FC Differdange 03 |

== Statistics ==
=== Performance by club ===
Teams in bold are still playing in the National Division. Teams in italics no longer exist.

| Club | Titles | Runners-up | Years won |
|---|---|---|---|
| **Jeunesse Esch** | 28 | 13 | 1920–21, 1936–37, 1950–51, 1953_54, 1957–58, 1958–59, 1959–60, 1962–63, 1966–67, 1967–68, 1969–70, 1972–73, 1973–74, 1974–75, 1975–76, 1976–77, 1979–80, 1982–83, 1984–85, 1986–87, 1987–88, 1994–95, 1995–96, 1996–97, 1997–98, 1998–99, 2003–04, 2009–10 |
| **F91 Dudelange** | 16 | 6 | 1999–2000, 2000–01, 2001–02, 2004–05, 2005–06, 2006–07, 2007–08, 2008–09, 2010–11, 2011–12, 2013–14, 2015–16, 2016–17, 2017–18, 2018–19, 2021–22 |
| CA Spora Luxembourg | 11 | 10 | 1924–25, 1927–28, 1928–29, 1933–34, 1934–35, 1935–36, 1937–38, 1948–49, 1955–56, 1960–61, 1988–89 |
| Stade Dudelange | 10 | 6 | 1938–39, 1939–40, 1944–45, 1945–46, 1946–47, 1947–48, 1949–50, 1954–55, 1956–57, 1964–65 |
| CS Fola Esch | 8 | 11 | 1917–18, 1919–20, 1921–22, 1923–24, 1929–30, 2012–13, 2014–15, 2020–21 |
| Red Boys Differdange | 6 | 11 | 1922–23, 1925–26, 1930–31, 1931–32, 1932–33, 1978–79 |
| Union Luxembourg | 6 | 9 | 1926–27, 1961–62, 1970–71, 1989–90, 1990–91, 1991–92 |
| FC Avenir Beggen | 6 | 5 | 1968–69, 1981–82, 1983–84, 1985–86, 1992–93, 1993–94 |
| US Hollerich Bonnevoie | 5 | 2 | 1911–12, 1913–14, 1914–15, 1915–16, 1916–17 |
| **FC Progrès Niederkorn** | 3 | 7 | 1952–53, 1977–78, 1980–81 |
| FC Aris Bonnevoie | 3 | 1 | 1963–64, 1965–66, 1971–72 |
| **Differdange 03** | 2 | 5 | 2023–24, 2024–25 |
| Sporting Club Luxembourg | 2 | 3 | 1910–11, 1918–19 |
| CS Grevenmacher | 1 | 7 | 2002–03 |
| National Schifflange | 1 | 2 | 1951–52 |
| **Swift Hesperange** | 1 | 1 | 2022–23 |
| Racing Club Luxembourg | 1 | - | 1909–10 |
| **Atert Bissen** | 1 | - | 2025–26 |
| US Dudelange | - | 4 | |
| US Rumelange | - | 3 | |
| FC Etzella Ettelbruck | - | 2 | |
| Alliance Dudelange | - | 1 | |
| **Racing FC Union Luxembourg** | - | 1 | |
| **UNA Strassen** | - | 1 | |

== Top scorers ==
| Season | Player | Team | Goals |
|---|---|---|---|
| 1997–98 | (Luxembourg) Mikhail Zaritskiy | Sporting Mertzig | 29 |
| 1998–99 | (France) Frédéric Cicchirillo | Sporting Mertzig | 25 |
| 1999–00 | (Luxembourg) Marcel Christophe | Mondercange | 26 |
| 2000–01 | (Luxembourg) Mikhail Zaritskiy | Sporting Mertzig | 23 |
| 2001–02 | (France) Frédéric Cicchirillo | Sporting Mertzig | 23 |
| 2002–03 | (Luxembourg) Daniel Huss | Grevenmacher | 22 |
| 2003–04 | (Cape Verde) José Andrade | Spora Luxembourg | 24 |
| 2004–05 | (Luxembourg) Sergio Pupovac | Alliance 01 | 24 |
| 2005–06 | (Turkey) Fatih Sözen | Grevenmacher | 23 |
| 2006–07 | (Luxembourg) Daniel da Mota | Etzella Ettelbruck | 24 |
| 2007–08 | (France) Emmanuel Coquelet | F91 Dudelange | 20 |
| 2008–09 | (France) Pierre Piskor | Differdange 03 | 30 |
| 2009–10 | (Luxembourg) Daniel Huss | Grevenmacher | 22 |
| 2010–11 | (Bosnia and Herzegovina) Sanel Ibrahimović | Wiltz 71 | 18 |
| 2011–12 | (France) Omar Er Rafik | Differdange 03 | 23 |
| 2012–13 | (Bosnia and Herzegovina) Edis Osmanović | Wiltz 71 | 21 |
| 2013–14 | (Bosnia and Herzegovina) Sanel Ibrahimović | Jeunesse Esch | 22 |
| 2014–15 | (Bosnia and Herzegovina) Sanel Ibrahimović | Jeunesse Esch | 21 |
| 2015–16 | (France) Julien Jahier | Racing | 25 |
| 2016–17 | (France) Omar Er Rafik | Differdange 03 | 26 |
| 2017–18 | (Luxembourg) David Turpel | F91 Dudelange | 33 |
| 2018–19 | (Morocco) Samir Hadji | Fola Esch | 23 |
| 2019–20 | Not awarded, abandoned due to COVID-19 pandemic | | |
| 2020–21 | (France) Zachary Hadji | Fola Esch | 33 |
| 2021–22 | (Germany) Dominik Stolz | Swift Hesperange | 19 |
| 2022–23 | (France) Rayan Philippe | Swift Hesperange | 29 |
| 2023–24 | (Portugal) Jorginho | Differdange 03 | 25 |
| 2024–25 | (Brazil) Matheus | UNA Strassen | 22 |
| 2025–26 | (Madagascar) Roman Ferber | Atert Bissen | 21 |

== Player records ==
=== Appearances ===
As of 12 June 2026

Players in bold are still active.

| # | Player | Appearances | Position | Year(s) | Club(s) |
|---|---|---|---|---|---|
| 1 | (Luxembourg) Jonathan Joubert | 539 | Goalkeeper | 1999–2023 | CS Grevenmacher, F91 Dudelange, Swift Hesperange, F91 Dudelange |
| 2 | (Luxembourg) **Daniel da Mota** | 459 | Winger | 2001– | Etzella Ettelbruck, F91 Dudelange, Racing Union, Differdange 03, Etzella Ettelbruck, Atert Bissen |
| 3 | (Luxembourg) Denis Scuto | 424 | Midfielder | 1981–2002 | Jeunesse Esch |
| 4 | (Luxembourg) René Peters | 422 | Midfielder | 2001–2019 | Swift Hesperange, Jeunesse Esch, Hamm Benfica, CS Grevenmacher, Jeunesse Esch, US Hostert |
| 5 | (Luxembourg) Théo Scholten | 419 | Midfielder | 1983–1999 | Aris Bonnevoie, Jeunesse Esch, Avenir Beggen, CS Grevenmacher |
| 6 | (Luxembourg) Jeannot Moes | 405 | Goalkeeper | 1967–1989 | Avenir Beggen |
| 7 | (Luxembourg) Paul Koch | 403 | Goalkeeper | 1983–2005 | Avenir Beggen, Red Boys Differdange, Avenir Beggen, CS Grevenmacher, F91 Dudelange, CS Oberkorn |
| 8 | (France) **Geoffrey Franzoni** | 400 | Right back | 2010– | FC Differdange 03 |
| 9 | (Luxembourg) Tom Schnell | 395 | Centre back | 2002–2023 | Union Luxembourg, Racing Union, Fola Esch, F91 Dudelange, FC Swift Hesperange, UNA Strassen |
| 10 | (Luxembourg) John van Rijswijck | 394 | Goalkeeper | 1983–2002 | Jeunesse Esch, Union Luxembourg, CS Hobscheid, Jeunesse Esch, Swift Hesperange |

=== Goals ===
As of 12 June 2026

Players in bold are still active.

| # | Player | Appearances | Position | Year(s) | Club(s) |
|---|---|---|---|---|---|
| 1 | (Luxembourg) Armin Krings | 255 | Forward | 1981–1997 | Avenir Beggen, Mondercange, Avenir Beggen |
| 2 | (Luxembourg) Daniel Huss | 228 | Striker | 1998–2014 | CS Grevenmacher |
| 3 | (Luxembourg) Patrick Morocutti | 223 | Forward | 1986–2001 | Union Luxembourg, Jeunesse Esch, Union Luxembourg |
| 4 | (Morocco) **Samir Hadji** | 193 | Striker | 2012– | Fola Esch, F91 Dudelange, Differdange 03 |
| 5 | (Luxembourg) Bert Heger | 176 | Forward | 1959–1975 | CS Grevenmacher, Stade Dudelange, Aris Bonnevoie, Avenir Beggen, Union Luxembourg, Fola Esch, Red Star Merl-Belair |
| 6 | (Luxembourg) **Daniel da Mota** | 158 | Winger | 2001– | Etzella Ettelbruck, F91 Dudelange, Racing Union, Differdange 03, Etzella Ettelbruck, Atert Bissen |
| 7 | (Luxembourg) Théo Scholten | 155 | Midfielder | 1983–1999 | Aris Bonnevoie, Jeunesse Esch, Avenir Beggen, CS Grevenmacher |
| 8 | (Luxembourg) Henri Cirelli | 152 | Midfielder | 1952–1975 | Alliance Dudelange, Avenir Beggen |
| 9 | (Bosnia and Herzegovina) Sanel Ibrahimović | 152 | Forward | 2009–2022 | Wiltz 71, Hamm Benfica, Jeunesse Esch, F91 Dudelange, Wiltz 71 |
| 10 | (Luxembourg) Furio Cardoni | 150 | Forward | 1965–1984 | US Rumelange |
