= FC Mondercange =

Association football club in Luxembourg

- Full name: Football Club Mondercange
- Founded: July 1933; 93 years ago
- Ground: Stade Communal, Mondercange
- Capacity: 3,300
- President: Luc Kremer
- Manager: Marc Depienne
- League: Division of Honour
- 2025–26: Division of Honour, 9th of 16
- Website: www.fcmondercange.lu
Home colours

Football Club Mondercange is a football club, based in Mondercange, in south-western Luxembourg. They currently compete in the Division of Honour, the second tier of Luxembourgish football.

== History ==
In the 2005–06 season, Mondercange finished third in the Division of Honour. This qualified Mondercange for a play-off with FC Avenir Beggen, which they won, granting them promotion into the National Division. They were relegated the following season from the National Division, back to the Division of Honour. In 2008–09 the club finished 2nd in the Division of Honour and were promoted to the National Division.

== Honours ==
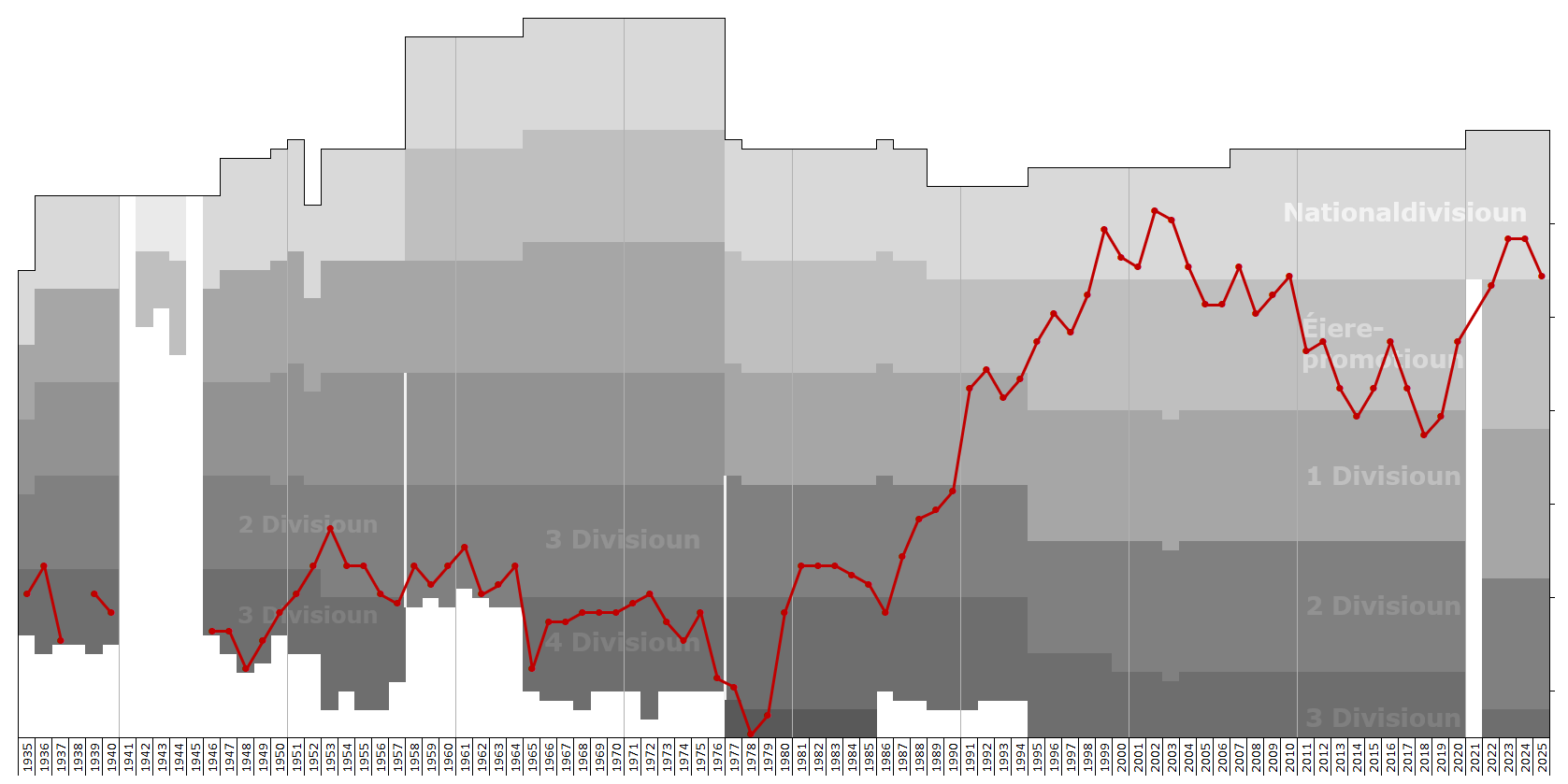
Historical league performance chart of FC Mondercange

- Luxembourg Cup
  - Runners-up (2): 1998–99, 1999–2000

== European competition ==
FC Mondercange have qualified for UEFA European competition once.

- UEFA Cup

Qualifying round (1): 1999–00

Overall, Mondercange's record in European competition reads:

	P	W	D	L	GF	GA	GD
FC Mondercange	2	0	0	2	2	13	−11

== Players ==
=== Current squad ===
As of 17 September 2025

Note: Flags indicate national team as defined under FIFA eligibility rules; some limited exceptions apply. Players may hold more than one non-FIFA nationality.

No.	Pos.	Nation	Player
1	GK	LUX	Ailan Alilovic
3	DF	FRA	Frédéric Mendy
4	DF	POR	Diogo Coimbra
5	MF	LUX	Fabio Cerqueira
6	MF	FRA	Jordan Swistek
7	MF	LUX	Dany De Sousa
9	FW	ANG	Elvis Delgado
10	MF	FRA	Maxime Loichot
11	MF	LUX	Noah Rodrigues
12	MF	LUX	Filipe Pinto
13	DF	FRA	Habib Ouhsfsa
14	MF	LUX	Eric Rolgen
15	MF	LUX	Rui Costa

No.	Pos.	Nation	Player
17	FW	LUX	Yonni Rocha
18	GK	LUX	Finn Pianon
19	FW	FRA	Djebril Danhach
20	DF	SEN	Amdy Konte
21	MF	LUX	Rayan Rafdy
22	GK	LUX	Maikel Antunes
23	DF	LUX	Tom Laterza
24	DF	FRA	Alexis Drinka
25	MF	BEL	Bruno Kwani
26	FW	FRA	Quissumgo Maconda
28	DF	FRA	Godmer Mabouba
29	FW	LUX	Antonio Luisi
30	GK	LUX	Dzemil Husovic
