= CS Hobscheid =

Defunct association football club in Luxembourg

- Full name: Cercle Sportif Hobscheid
- Nickname: Black-Yellow
- Founded: 1932
- Dissolved: 2007
- Ground: Stade Koericherberg, Hobscheid
- Capacity: 2,400
- 2006–07: 1. Division, 4th of 14
Home colours	Away colours

Cercle Sportif Hobscheid was a football club from Hobscheid, Luxembourg. In March 2007, the club merged with FC Olympique Eischen form FC Alliance Äischdall.

== European competition ==
Overall, Hobscheid's record in European competition reads:

Competition	P	W	D	L	F	A
Intertoto Cup	6	0	2	4	3	13

Season	Competition	Round	Opponent	1st Leg	2nd Leg	Agg
1998 Intertoto Cup		R1	(Czech Republic) Hradec Králové	0–0 (H)	1–2 (A)	1–2
2000 Intertoto Cup		R1	(North Macedonia) Pelister	1–3 (A)	0–1 (H)	1–4
2001 Intertoto Cup		R1	(Belarus) Dinamo Minsk	0–6 (A)	1–1 (H)	1–7

R1: First Round
