= Union 05 Kayl-Tétange =

Association football club in Luxembourg

- Full name: Union 05 Football Club De Kayl-Tétange
- Founded: 2005; 21 years ago
- Ground: Stade Victor Marchal, Tétange; Rue De Dudelange, Kayl
- Capacity: 1,000
- President: Mersudin Licina
- Manager: Joao Paulo Peixoto Correia
- League: 2. Division Series 2
- 2025–26: 2. Division Series 2, 5th of 14
Home colours

Union 05 Käl Téiteng or Union 05 Football Club Kayl-Tétange is a football club, based in the commune of Kayl, in south-western Luxembourg. They currently compete in the 2. Division Series 2, the fourth tier of Luxembourgish football.

Union 05 play their home games at the Stade Victor Marchal.

== History ==
The club was formed in 2005 after a merger between FC Kayl 07 and SC Tétange. SC Tétange won the 1950–51 Luxembourg Cup.

In 2009 the club was promoted to the second-tier Division of Honour and in 2010–11 they became champions and were promoted for the first time to the National Division, the highest level of Luxembourg football. After two years they were relegated back and in 2015–16 the club was relegated to the third-tier 1. Division.

== Honours ==
- Luxembourg Cup (1)
  - as SC Tétange (1)
    - Winners: 1950–51

== Managers ==
- (Luxembourg) Luc Muller (July 2009 – Dec 09)
- (Portugal) Alvaro da Cruz (Jan 2010 – June 10)
- (Portugal) Manuel Correia (July 2010–)
