= Stade Dudelange =

Defunct association football club in Luxembourg

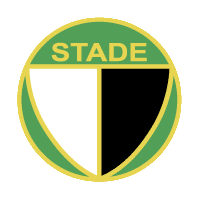
- Full name: Stade Dudelange
- Founded: 1913
- Dissolved: 1991
- Ground: Stade Aloyse Meyer, Dudelange
- 1990–91: 1. Division Series 2, 4th of 12

Stade Dudelange was a football club from Dudelange, in southern Luxembourg. It is now a part of F91 Dudelange, which was formed by the merger of Stade, Alliance Dudelange, and US Dudelange in 1991.

== History ==
History of F91 Dudelange

Unknown founded date Minerva Deich Dudelange
1908; Jeunesse Dudelange	1912 (merge); US Dudelange
1909; SC Dudelange
1908; Gallia Dudelange	1912 (rename); Sparta Luxembourg	1913 (rename); Stade Dudelange	1991 (merge); F91 Dudelange
1908; Étoile Bleue Dudelange
1916 (merge); Alliance Dudelange
1912; Étoile Rouge Dudelange

Stade was one of the country's most successful clubs, winning 10 National Division championships and four Luxembourg Cup titles; to this day, the former is the third-greatest haul by any club behind Jeunesse Esch and the defunct CA Spora Luxembourg. In its heyday of the late 1940s, Stade won four consecutive National Division titles. Including two championships won before World War II interrupted domestic play, Stade won a string of six consecutive titles, a feat that has never been matched.

During World War II, Luxembourg was annexed by Germany and the club became part of German football competition. Playing as FV Stadt Düdelingen they were part of the top flight Gauliga Moselland. The team captured the divisional title there in 1942 and advanced to the German national playoffs where they were put out by the dominant side of the era, FC Schalke 04, who were on their way to the championship.

== Honours ==
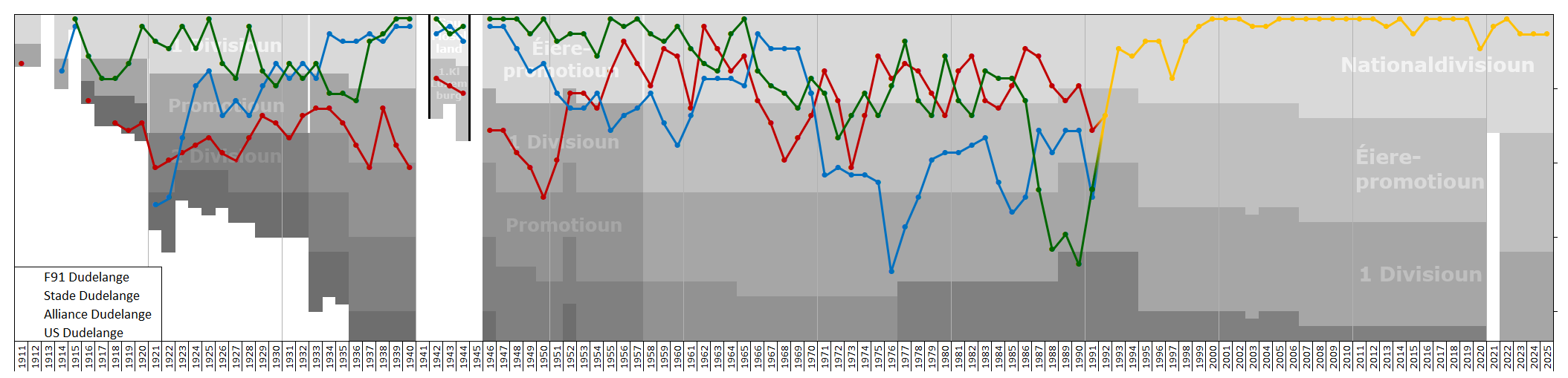
Historical league performance chart of F91 Dudelange and its predecessors, including Stade Dudelange

- National Division

Winners (10): 1938–39, 1939–40, 1944–45, 1945–46, 1946–47, 1947–48, 1949–50, 1954–55, 1956–57, 1964–65
Runners-up (6): 1919–20, 1922–23, 1924–25, 1927–28, 1955–56, 1959–60

- Luxembourg Cup

Winners (4): 1937–38, 1947–48, 1948–49, 1955–56
Runners-up (8): 1927–28, 1935–36, 1938–39, 1939–40, 1946–47, 1956–57, 1957–58, 1959–60

- Gauliga Moselland

Winners (1): 1941–42
