= FC Schifflange 95 =

Association football club in Luxembourg

Schifflange 95
- Full name: Foussballclub Schifflange 95
- Founded: 1995; 31 years ago
- Ground: Stade Rue Denis Netgen
- Capacity: 3,100
- President: Sam Neifer
- Manager: Paulo Fernandes
- League: 1. Division Series 2
- 2025–26: Division of Honour, 15th of 16 (relegated)
- Website: www.fcscheffleng95.lu
Home colours	Away colours

F.C. Schëffleng 95 or FC Schifflange 95 is a football club in Schifflange, Luxembourg founded in 1995. They currently compete in the 1. Division Series 2, the third tier of Luxembourgish football, and play their home games at the Stade Rue Denis Netgen.

== History ==
FC Schifflange 95 is the result of a merger between former Schifflange sides Amis des Sports (founded in 1936) and National Schifflange (founded in 1912). National Schifflange was a one-time Luxembourg champion after winning the 1951–52 Luxembourg National Division. National also won the 1960 Luxembourg Cup. The new merger club was established on 21 April 1995.

The first season of the new club saw them winning the 1st Division, with a four-point lead. After three seasons in the Promotion d'Honneur, FC Schifflange 95 clinched promotion to the top level Luxembourg National Division but got relegated immediately after that one season. Since its establishment, the club has therefore played only one season at the top level, six seasons in Division of Honour, 11 seasons in Division 1 and five seasons in Division 2. After 23 years, in 2023 FC Schifflange 95 got promoted back to the National Division but got relegated immediately again after just one season. In the 24/25 season they finished 13th in the second division but won the relegation playoffs again Syra Mensdorf

== Honours ==
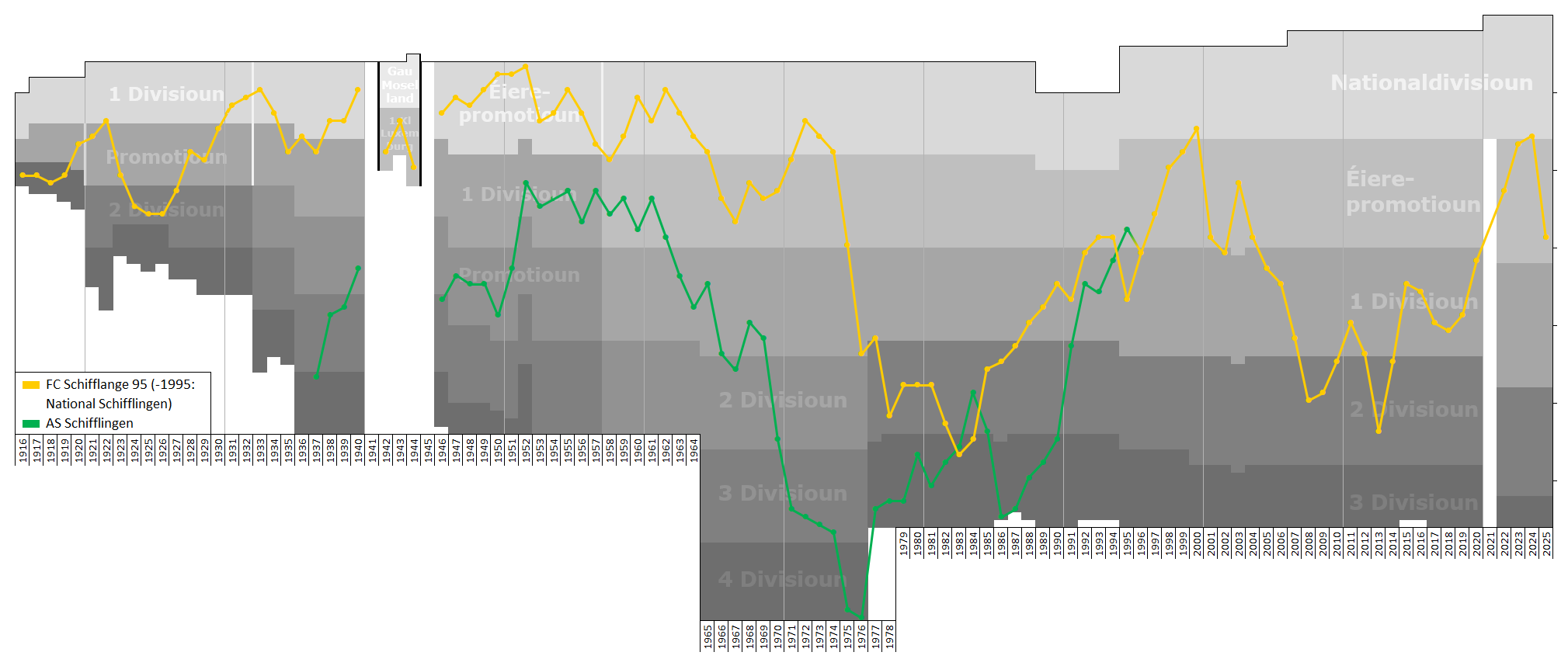
Historical league performance chart of FC Schifflange 95

=== Domestic ===
as National Schifflange

==== League ====
- Luxembourg National Division
  - Winners (1): 1951–52
  - Runners-up (2): 1949–50, 1950–51

==== Cup ====
- Luxembourg Cup
  - Winners (1): 1959–60
  - Runners-up (1): 1937–38

== Players ==
=== Current squad ===
As of 24 October 2025

Note: Flags indicate national team as defined under FIFA eligibility rules; some limited exceptions apply. Players may hold more than one non-FIFA nationality.

No.	Pos.	Nation	Player
1	GK	FRA	Tony Conti
2	DF	FRA	Beldi Kusama
5	MF	GAB	Harold Das Mavoungou
7	FW	ESP	Modou Niang
8	MF	BEL	Gianluigi Pitisci
9	FW	LUX	Kevin Agovic
11	DF	LUX	Nermin Klica
12	DF	FRA	Jimmy Mayery
17	MF	FRA	Yann Weishaupt
19	MF	LUX	Ruben Alves Vaz
20	DF	FRA	Wendell Quinas
21	MF	ITA	Matteo Pitisci

No.	Pos.	Nation	Player
22	MF	LUX	Glenn Sedja
23	FW	FRA	Naby Soumah
24	MF	ALG	Karim Koriche
25	DF	POR	Rafael Teixeira
29	MF	BEL	David Kiambu
38	DF	MNE	Demin Skenderovic
70	MF	GAB	Tony Ngavoura
77	MF	FRA	Rayane Medjkoune
78	MF	FRA	Bilal Wiemer
80	FW	POR	Evandro Delgado
88	FW	LUX	Pierre Mabika
99	FW	ESP	Adulai Mendes

== Former Players ==
- Miralem Pjanić, who later played for AS Roma, Juventus Turin and FC Barcelona, has started his youth career at age 7 in Schifflange, and stayed with the club for 7 years.
- Vancy Mabanza, joined Schifflange in January 2024 scoring 3 goals and assisting once for the club before leaving the following summer for KVK Tienen not long after he made the Belgian second division with Patro Eisden and KSC Lokeren
- Benjamin Besic, top scorer for Schifflange in the Luxembourg National Division later left to join Moulins Yzeure Foot where he was also the top scorer after that he joined Football Bourg-en-Bresse Péronnas 01 in Ligue 3 where his performance earned him a move to US Boulogne in Ligue 2
- Nabil Dirar joined in January 2024 after deciding to cancel his retirement to reunite with friend Randy Nzita who was the assistant coach
- Hamza Kadamani played for Schifflange youth teams before moving in Pjanic‘s footsteps and joining FC Metz and debuting for them under Luxembourgish Manager Luc Holtz in Ligue 2 at only 16 years old
