= 1988–89 Luxembourg National Division =

Luxembourg National Division
- Season: 1988–89

The 1988–89 Luxembourg National Division was the 75th season of top level association football in Luxembourg.

== Overview ==
10 teams competed, and CA Spora Luxembourg won the championship.

== First phase ==
=== Table ===
Pos	Team	Pld	W	D	L	GF	GA	GD	Pts	Qualification
1	Jeunesse Esch	18	14	1	3	44	6	+38	29	Qualification to championship stage
2	FA Red Boys Differdange	18	11	5	2	31	13	+18	27	Qualification to championship stage
3	Union Luxembourg	18	12	2	4	45	15	+30	26	Qualification to championship stage
4	CA Spora Luxembourg	18	9	6	3	35	17	+18	24	Qualification to championship stage
5	FC Avenir Beggen	18	8	6	4	34	20	+14	22	Qualification to championship stage
6	CS Grevenmacher	18	6	3	9	27	37	−10	15	Qualification to championship stage
7	FC Swift Hesperange	18	5	3	10	20	36	−16	13	Qualification to relegation stage
8	FC Progrès Niedercorn	18	4	1	13	18	44	−26	9	Qualification to relegation stage
9	FC Olympique Eischen	18	2	4	12	17	48	−31	8	Qualification to relegation stage
10	CS Pétange	18	2	3	13	14	49	−35	7	Qualification to relegation stage

Source: rsssf.com

=== Results ===
Home \ Away	AVE	GRE	JEU	OLY	PÉT	PRO	RBD	SPO	SWI	UNI
Avenir Beggen		3–1	1–0	4–0	4–1	1–4	1–2	1–1	2–2	2–4
Grevenmacher	1–1		1–4	3–3	0–0	3–1	0–1	2–3	3–2	0–5
Jeunesse Esch	2–0	4–0		5–0	6–0	4–0	1–0	2–1	2–0	4–0
Olympique Eischen	0–2	0–2	0–0		5–1	2–3	0–2	0–5	1–0	0–4
Pétange	0–3	0–4	1–4	1–1		2–0	0–5	1–1	1–2	0–2
Progrès Niederkorn	0–6	0–3	0–2	3–2	1–4		1–0	1–1	1–1	0–2
Red Boys Differdange	1–1	3–1	1–0	1–1	2–0	3–2		0–0	2–2	1–0
Spora Luxembourg	0–1	4–1	0–1	3–0	2–1	3–2	2–2		3–0	1–0
Swift Hesperange	1–1	0–2	0–3	4–0	2–0	2–0	0–3	1–4		1–4
Union Luxembourg	0–0	3–0	1–0	5–2	5–1	3–0	1–2	1–1	5–0	

Legend: Blue = home team win; Yellow = draw; Red = away team win.

== Second phase ==
=== Championship stage ===
==== Table ====
Pos	Team	Pld	W	D	L	GF	GA	GD	BP	Pts
1	CA Spora Luxembourg	10	7	3	0	24	9	+15	12	29
2	Jeunesse Esch	10	5	1	4	14	12	+2	14.5	25.5
3	Union Luxembourg	10	4	3	3	12	15	−3	13	24
4	FC Avenir Beggen	10	5	1	4	22	12	+10	11	22
5	FA Red Boys Differdange	10	2	4	4	14	14	0	13.5	21.5
6	CS Grevenmacher	10	1	0	9	5	29	−24	7.5	9.5

Source: rsssf.com

==== Results ====
Home \ Away	AVE	GRE	JEU	RBD	SPO	UNI
Avenir Beggen		4–0	0–1	2–2	1–2	3–2
Grevenmacher	0–5		1–3	1–5	0–3	0–1
Jeunesse Esch	1–3	1–0		1–1	0–2	3–0
Red Boys Differdange	0–2	0–1	1–2		1–5	0–0
Spora Luxembourg	1–0	5–2	3–2	0–0		2–2
Union Luxembourg	3–2	2–0	1–0	0–4	1–1	

Legend: Blue = home team win; Yellow = draw; Red = away team win.

=== Relegation/Promotion stage ===
==== Group A ====
===== Table =====
Pos	Team	Pld	W	D	L	GF	GA	GD	Pts
1	FC Swift Hesperange	10	7	2	1	24	10	+14	23
2	FC Aris Bonnevoie	10	6	2	2	27	11	+16	20
3	FC Sporting Mertzig	10	4	4	2	20	14	+6	16
4	FC Wiltz 71	10	2	4	4	14	23	−9	10
5	FC Olympique Eischen	10	2	1	7	17	30	−13	7
6	Young Boys Diekirch	10	1	3	6	14	28	−14	6

Source: rsssf.com

===== Results =====
Home \ Away	ARI	OLY	MER	SWI	WIL	YBD
Aris Bonnevoie		2–0	2–4	0–2	2–0	4–1
Olympique Eischen	0–8		2–4	1–0	6–1	2–3
Sporting Mertzig	0–2	5–1		1–1	2–2	2–1
Swift Hesperange	2–2	2–1	1–0		3–1	5–0
Wiltz 71	1–1	2–1	1–1	2–5		3–1
Young Boys Diekirch	1–4	3–3	1–1	2–3	1–1	

Legend: Blue = home team win; Yellow = draw; Red = away team win.

==== Group B ====
===== Table =====
Pos	Team	Pld	W	D	L	GF	GA	GD	Pts
1	CS Fola Esch	10	7	2	1	16	5	+11	23
2	Alliance Dudelange	10	4	5	1	17	12	+5	17
3	FC Progrès Niedercorn	10	5	2	3	24	9	+15	17
4	FC Koeppchen Wormeldange	10	4	2	4	12	17	−5	14
5	CS Oberkorn	10	2	2	6	7	18	−11	8
6	CS Pétange	10	1	1	8	9	24	−15	4

Source: rsssf.com

===== Results =====
Home \ Away	DUD	FOL	KOE	OBE	PÉT	PRO
Alliance Dudelange		0–1	1–1	3–0	2–2	4–3
Fola Esch	0–0		1–0	0–2	1–0	1–1
Koeppchen Wormeldange	2–2	2–5		2–0	2–0	0–4
Oberkorn	1–1	0–1	0–2		5–3	0–0
Pétange	1–2	1–4	0–1	2–0		0–3
Progrès Niederkorn	1–2	0–2	4–0	4–0	4–0	

Legend: Blue = home team win; Yellow = draw; Red = away team win.
