= 1987–88 Luxembourg National Division =

Luxembourg National Division
- Season: 1987–88

The 1987–88 Luxembourg National Division was the 74th season of top level association football in Luxembourg.

== Overview ==
It was performed in 12 teams, and Jeunesse Esch won the championship.

== Regular phase ==
=== Table ===
Pos	Team	Pld	W	D	L	GF	GA	GD	Pts	Qualification or relegation
1	Jeunesse Esch	22	15	4	3	53	20	+33	34	Qualification to championship play-off
2	CA Spora Luxembourg	22	14	5	3	56	21	+35	33	Qualification to championship play-off
3	FC Avenir Beggen	22	11	6	5	48	25	+23	28	Qualification to championship play-off
4	Union Luxembourg	22	11	5	6	48	32	+16	27	Qualification to championship play-off
5	FA Red Boys Differdange	22	8	7	7	36	27	+9	23	
6	FC Olympique Eischen	22	7	7	8	24	35	−11	21	
7	FC Progrès Niedercorn	22	7	6	9	35	35	0	20	
8	CS Grevenmacher	22	8	4	10	27	36	−9	20	
9	FC Swift Hesperange	22	6	4	12	32	48	−16	16	Qualification to relegation play-off
10	Alliance Dudelange	22	6	4	12	24	40	−16	16	Qualification to relegation play-off
11	FC Aris Bonnevoie	22	5	6	11	33	54	−21	16	Qualification to relegation play-off
12	US Rumelange	22	2	6	14	20	63	−43	10	Relegation to Luxembourg Division of Honour

Source: rsssf.com

=== Results ===
Home \ Away	DUD	ARI	AVE	GRE	JEU	OLY	PRO	RBD	RUM	SPO	SWI	UNI
Alliance Dudelange		2–0	1–3	1–0	1–1	0–2	3–0	0–1	1–5	1–3	2–0	1–3
Aris Bonnevoie	3–0		2–2	0–4	1–2	2–2	3–3	1–3	1–1	1–3	0–2	3–1
Avenir Beggen	0–1	3–0		4–1	6–0	1–1	3–1	2–1	2–2	2–1	1–1	3–0
Grevenmacher	1–1	1–3	1–0		0–1	2–1	0–1	0–3	2–0	1–4	3–1	0–2
Jeunesse Esch	2–0	4–1	4–2	2–0		5–0	3–2	0–0	4–0	0–0	4–0	4–0
Olympique Eischen	3–2	0–4	3–2	1–1	2–2		0–1	0–0	3–0	0–0	1–0	0–5
Progrès Niederkorn	3–1	0–2	0–0	0–1	0–4	3–0		2–1	5–0	1–4	1–1	1–1
Red Boys Differdange	1–2	6–1	0–3	2–3	2–1	0–0	1–1		2–2	1–0	4–1	1–1
Rumelange	1–1	0–0	0–3	1–1	0–4	1–2	0–6	0–3		0–3	5–3	0–2
Spora Luxembourg	5–1	6–1	1–1	1–1	0–4	3–2	3–1	3–1	5–0		1–0	3–1
Swift Hesperange	3–2	3–3	4–3	1–2	2–0	0–1	2–2	1–0	4–1	0–6		1–2
Union Luxembourg	0–0	6–1	0–2	6–2	1–2	1–0	2–1	3–3	6–1	1–1	4–2	

Legend: Blue = home team win; Yellow = draw; Red = away team win.

== Final phase ==
=== Championship play-off ===
==== Table ====
Pos	Team	Pld	W	D	L	GF	GA	GD	BP	Pts
1	Jeunesse Esch	6	4	0	2	9	7	+2	17	25
2	FC Avenir Beggen	6	4	1	1	12	4	+8	14	23
3	Union Luxembourg	6	3	1	2	10	6	+4	13.5	20.5
4	CA Spora Luxembourg	6	0	0	6	2	16	−14	16.5	16.5

Source: rsssf.com

==== Results ====
Home \ Away	AVE	JEU	SPO	UNI
Avenir Beggen		2–1	4–1	5–1
Jeunesse Esch	1–0		3–0	1–0
Spora Luxembourg	0–1	1–3		0–2
Union Luxembourg	0–0	4–0	4–1	

Legend: Blue = home team win; Yellow = draw; Red = away team win.

=== Relegation play-off ===
==== Table ====
Pos	Team	Pld	W	D	L	GF	GA	GD	Pts
1	FC Swift Hesperange	6	3	2	1	12	7	+5	8
2	Jeunesse Wasserbillig	6	2	2	2	9	8	+1	6
3	FC Aris Bonnevoie	6	2	1	3	11	11	0	5
4	Alliance Dudelange	6	1	3	2	2	8	−6	5

Source: rsssf.com

==== Results ====
Home \ Away	DUD	ARI	SWI	WAS
Alliance Dudelange		1–1	0–0	0–3
Aris Bonnevoie	4–0		3–4	1–2
Swift Hesperange	0–1	3–0		1–1
Jeunesse Wasserbillig	0–0	1–2	2–4	

Legend: Blue = home team win; Yellow = draw; Red = away team win.
