= 1982–83 Luxembourg National Division =

Luxembourg National Division
- Season: 1982–83

The 1982–83 Luxembourg National Division was the 69th season of top level association football in Luxembourg.

== Overview ==
It was performed in 12 teams, and Jeunesse Esch won the championship.

== League standings ==
Pos	Team	Pld	W	D	L	GF	GA	GD	Pts
1	Jeunesse Esch	22	16	2	4	69	29	+40	34
2	FC Avenir Beggen	22	12	5	5	39	23	+16	29
3	FC Aris Bonnevoie	22	10	8	4	43	26	+17	28
4	FC Progrès Niedercorn	22	10	8	4	32	19	+13	28
5	CS Grevenmacher	22	8	7	7	31	34	−3	23
6	US Rumelange	22	8	6	8	33	33	0	22
7	FA Red Boys Differdange	22	7	6	9	36	35	+1	20
8	Stade Dudelange	22	5	9	8	31	44	−13	19
9	Union Luxembourg	22	8	2	12	42	38	+4	18
10	FC Wiltz 71	22	6	5	11	31	42	−11	17
11	FC Olympique Eischen	22	6	4	12	16	38	−22	16
12	Alliance Dudelange	22	2	6	14	15	57	−42	10

Source: rsssf.com

== Results ==
Home \ Away	ALD	ARI	AVE	GRE	JEU	OLY	PRO	RBD	RUM	STD	UNI	WIL
Alliance Dudelange		0–1	1–2	2–2	0–4	2–2	0–1	0–2	0–0	1–3	0–3	0–6
Aris Bonnevoie	4–0		2–2	2–2	2–4	3–0	2–1	2–2	1–2	1–1	3–1	4–1
Avenir Beggen	2–0	0–2		4–2	2–1	0–1	1–0	1–2	1–1	1–1	3–1	2–2
Grevenmacher	0–1	1–1	1–0		2–0	0–0	1–1	1–1	0–3	3–0	0–2	2–0
Jeunesse Esch	4–2	2–0	2–0	7–0		4–2	0–1	2–2	6–1	6–2	4–2	4–0
Olympique Eischen	0–1	1–0	0–2	0–3	1–1		1–0	3–0	0–4	0–0	1–0	4–0
Progrès Niederkorn	5–0	1–1	1–1	1–4	2–0	3–0		1–1	1–1	2–0	1–1	1–1
Red Boys Differdange	5–0	0–0	2–4	1–2	3–5	4–0	1–2		5–1	1–2	2–1	0–1
Rumelange	2–2	1–2	0–2	3–1	1–4	3–0	0–1	1–1		2–2	0–3	0–1
Stade Dudelange	0–0	0–4	0–5	2–2	2–5	4–0	2–2	3–0	0–3		1–1	2–2
Union Luxembourg	6–0	2–4	0–2	3–0	1–2	1–0	1–2	3–0	0–3	2–4		3–4
Wiltz 71	3–3	2–2	1–2	0–2	1–2	3–0	0–2	0–1	0–1	1–0	2–5	

Legend: Blue = home team win; Yellow = draw; Red = away team win.
