= 1984–85 Luxembourg National Division =

Luxembourg National Division
- Season: 1984–85

The 1984–85 Luxembourg National Division was the 71st season of top level association football in Luxembourg.

== Overview ==
It was performed in 12 teams, and Jeunesse Esch won the championship.

== League standings ==
Pos	Team	Pld	W	D	L	GF	GA	GD	Pts
1	Jeunesse Esch	22	17	3	2	65	20	+45	37
2	FA Red Boys Differdange	22	13	6	3	41	22	+19	32
3	FC Avenir Beggen	22	12	4	6	54	29	+25	28
4	FC Progrès Niedercorn	22	11	6	5	45	30	+15	28
5	CA Spora Luxembourg	22	9	6	7	34	28	+6	24
6	Union Luxembourg	22	9	5	8	49	42	+7	23
7	FC Aris Bonnevoie	22	6	6	10	36	44	−8	18
8	FC Olympique Eischen	22	8	2	12	27	42	−15	18
9	Stade Dudelange	22	6	4	12	26	48	−22	16
10	Alliance Dudelange	22	6	3	13	20	50	−30	15
11	FC Wiltz 71	22	6	1	15	45	55	−10	13
12	US Rumelange	22	4	4	14	19	51	−32	12

Source: rsssf.com

== Results ==
Home \ Away	ALD	ARI	AVE	JEU	OLY	PRO	RBD	RUM	SPO	STD	UNI	WIL
Alliance Dudelange		2–0	0–1	0–2	0–1	1–4	1–3	4–1	1–3	1–2	2–1	0–3
Aris Bonnevoie	1–1		0–2	0–6	4–3	1–1	1–2	1–1	3–0	2–2	3–3	3–2
Avenir Beggen	0–0	5–2		2–4	6–0	3–3	0–1	4–0	1–1	5–1	2–3	6–1
Jeunesse Esch	6–0	1–3	2–0		2–3	4–0	2–1	3–0	0–0	2–0	4–1	4–2
Olympique Eischen	1–2	1–0	0–3	1–4		1–1	0–1	4–0	2–1	0–3	3–1	1–0
Progrès Niederkorn	5–1	2–1	4–1	2–2	2–0		1–4	4–0	1–2	5–2	0–2	3–1
Red Boys Differdange	1–1	2–5	2–2	1–1	2–0	0–0		2–0	1–0	0–0	0–0	6–1
Rumelange	0–1	1–1	0–1	0–3	4–1	1–1	0–3		4–1	0–3	2–1	2–1
Spora Luxembourg	0–1	1–2	1–2	1–3	3–2	0–0	4–0	3–2		6–0	1–1	2–1
Stade Dudelange	1–1	0–4	0–2	1–5	2–0	1–3	0–2	0–0	0–1		3–2	2–1
Union Luxembourg	5–0	3–1	5–3	0–2	2–1	1–2	1–1	4–0	1–1	1–0		5–5
Wiltz 71	4–0	3–2	0–5	2–3	1–2	0–1	2–4	5–1	1–2	4–2	4–1	

Legend: Blue = home team win; Yellow = draw; Red = away team win.
