= 1989–90 Luxembourg National Division =

Luxembourg National Division
- Season: 1989–90

The 1989–90 Luxembourg National Division was the 76th season of top level association football in Luxembourg.

== Overview ==
It was performed in 10 teams, and Union Luxembourg won the championship.

== First phase ==
=== Table ===
| Pos | Team | Pld | W | D | L | GF | GA | GD | Pts | Qualification |
|---|---|---|---|---|---|---|---|---|---|---|
| 1 | FC Avenir Beggen | 18 | 14 | 3 | 1 | 57 | 12 | +45 | 31 | Qualification to championship stage |
| 2 | Union Luxembourg | 18 | 12 | 3 | 3 | 38 | 17 | +21 | 27 | Qualification to championship stage |
| 3 | CS Fola Esch | 18 | 7 | 8 | 3 | 23 | 14 | +9 | 22 | Qualification to championship stage |
| 4 | CA Spora Luxembourg | 18 | 9 | 4 | 5 | 28 | 23 | +5 | 22 | Qualification to championship stage |
| 5 | Jeunesse Esch | 18 | 6 | 9 | 3 | 23 | 20 | +3 | 21 | Qualification to championship stage |
| 6 | CS Grevenmacher | 18 | 6 | 5 | 7 | 21 | 22 | −1 | 17 | Qualification to championship stage |
| 7 | FA Red Boys Differdange | 18 | 4 | 8 | 6 | 25 | 18 | +7 | 16 | Qualification to relegation stage |
| 8 | FC Aris Bonnevoie | 18 | 4 | 6 | 8 | 11 | 27 | −16 | 14 | Qualification to relegation stage |
| 9 | FC Swift Hesperange | 18 | 1 | 4 | 13 | 14 | 44 | −30 | 6 | Qualification to relegation stage |
| 10 | Alliance Dudelange | 18 | 0 | 4 | 14 | 12 | 55 | −43 | 4 | Qualification to relegation stage |

Source: rsssf.com

=== Results ===
| Home \ Away | DUD | ARI | AVE | FOL | GRE | JEU | RBD | SPO | SWI | UNI |
|---|---|---|---|---|---|---|---|---|---|---|
| Alliance Dudelange | | 1–1 | 1–3 | 0–1 | 0–3 | 0–2 | 2–2 | 0–2 | 1–1 | 0–8 |
| Aris Bonnevoie | 2–1 | | 0–3 | 1–5 | 1–0 | 0–0 | 1–0 | 0–2 | 0–1 | 2–2 |
| Avenir Beggen | 5–2 | 6–0 | | 5–0 | 3–0 | 2–3 | 2–0 | 5–0 | 2–0 | 5–0 |
| Fola Esch | 5–0 | 1–0 | 0–0 | | 5–0 | 1–1 | 1–1 | 0–0 | 1–0 | 0–1 |
| Grevenmacher | 4–1 | 2–0 | 0–0 | 0–0 | | 0–0 | 2–3 | 0–0 | 3–1 | 0–1 |
| Jeunesse Esch | 2–1 | 1–1 | 3–4 | 0–0 | 1–1 | | 1–1 | 0–4 | 4–1 | 1–0 |
| Red Boys Differdange | 6–0 | 1–1 | 0–2 | 1–1 | 0–1 | 0–0 | | 0–1 | 0–0 | 4–0 |
| Spora Luxembourg | 1–0 | 0–0 | 1–4 | 1–2 | 3–1 | 1–1 | 2–0 | | 5–2 | 1–4 |
| Swift Hesperange | 2–2 | 0–1 | 1–5 | 0–0 | 1–4 | 2–3 | 0–5 | 1–3 | | 1–3 |
| Union Luxembourg | 5–0 | 1–0 | 1–1 | 3–0 | 2–0 | 1–0 | 1–1 | 3–1 | 2–0 | |

Legend: Blue = home team win; Yellow = draw; Red = away team win.

== Second phase ==
=== Championship stage ===
==== Table ====
| Pos | Team | Pld | W | D | L | GF | GA | GD | BP | Pts |
|---|---|---|---|---|---|---|---|---|---|---|
| 1 | Union Luxembourg | 10 | 7 | 2 | 1 | 31 | 6 | +25 | 13.5 | 29.5 |
| 2 | FC Avenir Beggen | 10 | 5 | 2 | 3 | 28 | 14 | +14 | 15.5 | 27.5 |
| 3 | Jeunesse Esch | 10 | 7 | 2 | 1 | 22 | 9 | +13 | 10.5 | 26.5 |
| 4 | CA Spora Luxembourg | 10 | 3 | 3 | 4 | 14 | 15 | −1 | 11 | 20 |
| 5 | CS Fola Esch | 10 | 2 | 1 | 7 | 12 | 30 | −18 | 11 | 16 |
| 6 | CS Grevenmacher | 10 | 0 | 2 | 8 | 8 | 41 | −33 | 8.5 | 10.5 |

Source: rsssf.com

==== Results ====
| Home \ Away | AVE | FOL | GRE | JEU | SPO | UNI |
|---|---|---|---|---|---|---|
| Avenir Beggen | | 8–3 | 2–0 | 1–1 | 1–1 | 0–1 |
| Fola Esch | 2–4 | | 2–1 | 0–1 | 2–1 | 0–6 |
| Grevenmacher | 0–9 | 2–2 | | 0–3 | 1–4 | 1–4 |
| Jeunesse Esch | 3–1 | 1–0 | 7–2 | | 2–0 | 0–3 |
| Spora Luxembourg | 3–1 | 2–1 | 1–1 | 0–2 | | 0–0 |
| Union Luxembourg | 0–1 | 4–0 | 7–0 | 2–2 | 4–2 | |

Legend: Blue = home team win; Yellow = draw; Red = away team win.

=== Relegation/Promotion stage ===
==== Group A ====
===== Table =====
| Pos | Team | Pld | W | D | L | GF | GA | GD | Pts |
|---|---|---|---|---|---|---|---|---|---|
| 1 | FA Red Boys Differdange | 10 | 8 | 1 | 1 | 30 | 8 | +22 | 25 |
| 2 | FC Swift Hesperange | 10 | 7 | 0 | 3 | 27 | 13 | +14 | 21 |
| 3 | FC Olympique Eischen | 10 | 3 | 3 | 4 | 13 | 24 | −11 | 12 |
| 4 | FC Victoria Rosport | 10 | 4 | 0 | 6 | 17 | 24 | −7 | 12 |
| 5 | FC Etzella Ettelbruck | 10 | 2 | 3 | 5 | 13 | 21 | −8 | 9 |
| 6 | FC Wiltz 71 | 10 | 2 | 1 | 7 | 17 | 27 | −10 | 7 |

Source: rsssf.com

===== Results =====
| Home \ Away | ETZ | OLY | RBD | SWI | VIC | WIL |
|---|---|---|---|---|---|---|
| Etzella Ettelbruck | | 1–1 | 1–3 | 1–3 | 1–4 | 3–2 |
| Olympique Eischen | 2–2 | | 2–6 | 2–1 | 0–1 | 3–2 |
| Red Boys Differdange | 1–1 | 0–1 | | 2–0 | 7–2 | 3–1 |
| Swift Hesperange | 2–0 | 6–1 | 0–2 | | 3–1 | 4–1 |
| Victoria Rosport | 2–1 | 4–0 | 0–3 | 1–2 | | 1–4 |
| Wiltz 71 | 1–2 | 1–1 | 0–3 | 2–6 | 3–1 | |

Legend: Blue = home team win; Yellow = draw; Red = away team win.

==== Group B ====
===== Table =====
| Pos | Team | Pld | W | D | L | GF | GA | GD | Pts |
|---|---|---|---|---|---|---|---|---|---|
| 1 | FC Aris Bonnevoie | 10 | 8 | 1 | 1 | 29 | 11 | +18 | 25 |
| 2 | FC Progrès Niedercorn | 10 | 6 | 1 | 3 | 23 | 13 | +10 | 19 |
| 3 | AS Differdange | 10 | 5 | 1 | 4 | 18 | 14 | +4 | 16 |
| 4 | FC Koeppchen Wormeldange | 10 | 4 | 1 | 5 | 13 | 24 | −11 | 13 |
| 5 | Alliance Dudelange | 10 | 3 | 1 | 6 | 7 | 15 | −8 | 10 |
| 6 | CS Pétange | 10 | 0 | 3 | 7 | 10 | 23 | −13 | 3 |

Source: rsssf.com

===== Results =====
| Home \ Away | DUD | ARI | DIF | KOE | PÉT | PRO |
|---|---|---|---|---|---|---|
| Alliance Dudelange | | 0–2 | 1–0 | 0–1 | 2–1 | 1–0 |
| Aris Bonnevoie | 2–0 | | 2–0 | 7–1 | 1–1 | 3–2 |
| AS Differdange | 3–0 | 1–4 | | 1–0 | 2–0 | 4–0 |
| Koeppchen Wormeldange | 3–2 | 2–5 | 1–1 | | 2–1 | 1–2 |
| Pétange | 1–1 | 1–3 | 2–4 | 1–2 | | 1–1 |
| Progrès Niederkorn | 2–0 | 3–0 | 4–2 | 4–0 | 5–1 | |

Legend: Blue = home team win; Yellow = draw; Red = away team win.
