= 1968–69 Luxembourg National Division =

Luxembourg National Division
- Season: 1968–69
- Champions: FC Avenir Beggen (1st title)
- Matches: 132
- Goals: 456 (3.45 per match)
- Highest scoring: Union Luxembourg 11–2 CS Fola Esch; Progres Niedercorn 3–10 Avenir Beggen

The 1968–69 Luxembourg National Division was the 55th season of top level association football in Luxembourg.

== Overview ==
It was performed in 12 teams, and FC Avenir Beggen won the championship.

== League standings ==
Pos	Team	Pld	W	D	L	GF	GA	GD	Pts
1	FC Avenir Beggen	22	16	2	4	67	29	+38	34
2	Jeunesse Esch	22	16	2	4	44	14	+30	34
3	FC Aris Bonnevoie	22	12	6	4	41	24	+17	30
4	Union Luxembourg	22	12	5	5	62	31	+31	29
5	US Dudelange	22	10	7	5	37	30	+7	27
6	FA Red Boys Differdange	22	9	5	8	43	32	+11	23
7	CA Spora Luxembourg	22	7	3	12	35	42	−7	17
8	US Mondorf	22	7	3	12	30	51	−21	17
9	US Rumelange	22	4	8	10	19	27	−8	16
10	FC Progrès Niedercorn	22	4	5	13	27	61	−34	13
11	CS Grevenmacher	22	4	5	13	21	56	−35	13
12	CS Fola Esch	22	4	3	15	30	59	−29	11

Source: rsssf.com

== Results ==
Home \ Away	ARI	AVE	USD	FOL	GRE	JEU	MON	PRO	RBD	RUM	SPO	UNI
Aris Bonnevoie		0–0	3–2	1–2	4–1	0–1	5–2	3–0	1–4	0–0	3–2	2–1
Avenir Beggen	3–2		0–1	2–0	4–0	1–0	5–1	4–0	3–1	0–2	2–1	3–1
US Dudelange	1–1	4–4		6–2	2–1	0–1	1–0	1–1	1–6	0–0	0–1	3–5
Fola Esch	1–4	0–2	0–2		3–4	2–1	0–2	0–1	1–3	0–1	4–0	4–5
Grevenmacher	1–1	0–5	3–3	2–0		0–1	0–1	1–0	0–3	1–0	0–0	1–4
Jeunesse Esch	0–0	1–3	0–2	4–0	2–0		4–1	9–1	2–1	2–0	2–1	3–0
Mondorf	1–3	0–3	0–0	0–3	3–1	0–2		1–5	0–0	3–2	3–3	0–1
Progrès Niederkorn	1–3	3–10	1–2	1–1	3–3	0–1	2–4		0–4	3–0	1–5	1–1
Red Boys Differdange	0–2	2–7	0–2	3–1	7–0	0–2	2–4	0–0		1–1	3–1	0–0
Rumelange	0–0	3–2	0–1	1–1	1–1	1–2	2–3	2–1	0–0		1–2	1–1
Spora Luxembourg	1–2	2–3	0–2	3–3	4–1	0–3	3–0	0–1	0–2	2–1		2–1
Union Luxembourg	0–1	5–1	1–1	11–2	5–0	1–1	4–1	6–1	4–1	1–0	4–2	

Legend: Blue = home team win; Yellow = draw; Red = away team win.
