= 1959–60 Luxembourg National Division =

Luxembourg National Division
- Season: 1959–60
- Champions: Jeunesse Esch (7th title)
- Matches: 132
- Goals: 434 (3.29 per match)
- Highest scoring: FA Red Boys Differdange 8–3 CS Fola Esch

The 1959–60 Luxembourg National Division was the 46th season of top level association football in Luxembourg.

== Overview ==
It was performed in 12 teams, and Jeunesse Esch won the championship.

== League standings ==
Pos	Team	Pld	W	D	L	GF	GA	GD	Pts
1	Jeunesse Esch	22	15	4	3	62	25	+37	34
2	Stade Dudelange	22	12	4	6	42	32	+10	28
3	CS Grevenmacher	22	11	4	7	35	20	+15	26
4	Union Luxembourg	22	7	10	5	28	22	+6	24
5	National Schifflange	22	8	6	8	27	26	+1	22
6	Alliance Dudelange	22	7	7	8	45	31	+14	21
7	FA Red Boys Differdange	22	7	6	9	28	33	−5	20
8	FC Aris Bonnevoie	22	8	3	11	38	43	−5	19
9	CA Spora Luxembourg	22	8	3	11	38	44	−6	19
10	SC Tétange	22	5	8	9	26	45	−19	18
11	CS Fola Esch	22	8	1	13	38	69	−31	17
12	FC Progrès Niedercorn	22	4	8	10	27	44	−17	16

Source: rsssf.com

== Results ==
Home \ Away	ALD	ARI	FOL	GRE	JEU	NAT	PRO	RBD	SPO	STD	TÉT	UNI
Alliance Dudelange		3–1	8–1	1–0	0–1	3–0	3–3	2–2	4–1	0–2	1–2	1–2
Aris Bonnevoie	4–2		2–3	1–5	4–4	2–1	1–0	4–0	0–1	2–1	7–3	2–1
Fola Esch	3–1	2–4		0–2	1–5	3–2	1–3	3–4	0–5	0–2	4–0	1–5
Grevenmacher	0–0	1–0	1–2		4–0	1–3	0–1	0–0	3–1	3–1	0–1	0–0
Jeunesse Esch	2–1	3–1	7–1	2–3		1–0	5–1	3–0	6–1	6–0	2–2	1–1
National Schifflange	1–1	1–0	2–1	0–0	0–1		0–0	0–1	2–1	3–0	1–1	3–0
Progrès Niederkorn	1–1	2–1	1–2	1–2	1–7	1–1		0–0	3–5	1–2	1–0	0–0
Red Boys Differdange	0–2	2–0	8–3	1–0	1–2	1–2	1–1		1–0	1–1	1–1	1–0
Spora Luxembourg	4–2	3–0	0–1	1–3	1–1	0–3	4–2	3–1		1–1	2–3	2–4
Stade Dudelange	0–0	3–0	6–3	3–2	1–2	6–2	3–1	1–0	3–0		3–0	0–3
Tétange	0–8	2–2	1–1	1–4	0–1	2–0	1–1	3–1	0–1	1–2		1–1
Union Luxembourg	1–1	0–0	0–2	0–1	1–0	0–0	4–2	2–1	1–1	1–1	1–1	

Legend: Blue = home team win; Yellow = draw; Red = away team win.
