= 1992–93 Luxembourg National Division =

Luxembourg National Division
- Season: 1992–93
- Champions: FC Avenir Beggen (5th title)
- Relegated: FC Etzella Ettelbruck

The 1992–93 Luxembourg National Division was the 79th season of top level association football in Luxembourg.

== Overview ==
It was performed in 10 teams, and FC Avenir Beggen won the championship.

== First phase ==
=== Table ===
| Pos | Team | Pld | W | D | L | GF | GA | GD | Pts | Qualification |
|---|---|---|---|---|---|---|---|---|---|---|
| 1 | Union Luxembourg | 18 | 10 | 5 | 3 | 44 | 17 | +27 | 25 | Qualification to championship stage |
| 2 | FC Avenir Beggen | 18 | 9 | 7 | 2 | 33 | 17 | +16 | 25 | Qualification to championship stage |
| 3 | Jeunesse Esch | 18 | 10 | 4 | 4 | 31 | 16 | +15 | 24 | Qualification to championship stage |
| 4 | CS Grevenmacher | 18 | 7 | 7 | 4 | 32 | 20 | +12 | 21 | Qualification to championship stage |
| 5 | F91 Dudelange | 18 | 6 | 6 | 6 | 19 | 22 | −3 | 18 | Qualification to championship stage |
| 6 | CS Fola Esch | 18 | 6 | 5 | 7 | 25 | 27 | −2 | 17 | Qualification to championship stage |
| 7 | CA Spora Luxembourg | 18 | 6 | 5 | 7 | 23 | 30 | −7 | 17 | Qualification to relegation stage |
| 8 | FC Aris Bonnevoie | 18 | 5 | 5 | 8 | 30 | 32 | −2 | 15 | Qualification to relegation stage |
| 9 | FA Red Boys Differdange | 18 | 3 | 7 | 8 | 25 | 40 | −15 | 13 | Qualification to relegation stage |
| 10 | FC Etzella Ettelbruck | 18 | 1 | 3 | 14 | 11 | 52 | −41 | 5 | Qualification to relegation stage |

Source: rsssf.com

=== Results ===
| Home \ Away | ARI | AVE | ETZ | DUD | FOL | GRE | JEU | RBD | SPO | UNI |
|---|---|---|---|---|---|---|---|---|---|---|
| Aris Bonnevoie | | 2–2 | 5–0 | 1–1 | 2–0 | 0–3 | 1–2 | 4–4 | 1–1 | 2–4 |
| Avenir Beggen | 3–0 | | 2–0 | 1–1 | 0–0 | 1–1 | 1–0 | 4–1 | 1–2 | 1–0 |
| Etzella Ettelbruck | 0–4 | 0–3 | | 0–0 | 2–3 | 1–1 | 1–0 | 1–3 | 0–2 | 1–5 |
| F91 Dudelange | 1–3 | 2–0 | 2–0 | | 3–0 | 1–1 | 0–4 | 2–2 | 3–2 | 0–1 |
| Fola Esch | 0–0 | 2–3 | 1–1 | 2–0 | | 2–3 | 0–3 | 6–0 | 2–2 | 2–0 |
| Grevenmacher | 2–0 | 1–1 | 3–1 | 1–2 | 2–0 | | 3–0 | 3–3 | 1–1 | 1–1 |
| Jeunesse Esch | 4–0 | 2–2 | 3–0 | 1–0 | 2–0 | 2–0 | | 3–1 | 0–0 | 1–5 |
| Red Boys Differdange | 0–3 | 1–1 | 2–1 | 0–0 | 1–1 | 1–2 | 1–1 | | 3–0 | 1–4 |
| Spora Luxembourg | 4–2 | 1–4 | 2–1 | 1–2 | 2–0 | 1–5 | 0–2 | 2–0 | | 2–1 |
| Union Luxembourg | 2–0 | 2–2 | 11–1 | 3–0 | 1–1 | 1–0 | 1–1 | 2–1 | 0–0 | |

Legend: Blue = home team win; Yellow = draw; Red = away team win.

== Second phase ==
=== Championship stage ===
==== Table ====
| Pos | Team | Pld | W | D | L | GF | GA | GD | BP | Pts |
|---|---|---|---|---|---|---|---|---|---|---|
| 1 | FC Avenir Beggen | 10 | 7 | 2 | 1 | 31 | 14 | +17 | 12.5 | 28.5 |
| 2 | Union Luxembourg | 10 | 7 | 1 | 2 | 27 | 10 | +17 | 12.5 | 27.5 |
| 3 | Jeunesse Esch | 10 | 4 | 3 | 3 | 23 | 23 | 0 | 12 | 23 |
| 4 | CS Grevenmacher | 10 | 3 | 3 | 4 | 12 | 20 | −8 | 10.5 | 19.5 |
| 5 | F91 Dudelange | 10 | 4 | 1 | 5 | 19 | 21 | −2 | 9 | 18 |
| 6 | CS Fola Esch | 10 | 0 | 0 | 10 | 6 | 30 | −24 | 8.5 | 8.5 |

Source: rsssf.com

==== Results ====
| Home \ Away | AVE | DUD | FOL | GRE | JEU | UNI |
|---|---|---|---|---|---|---|
| Avenir Beggen | | 4–1 | 2–0 | 4–1 | 5–3 | 4–1 |
| F91 Dudelange | 1–3 | | 2–1 | 3–0 | 1–1 | 1–4 |
| Fola Esch | 1–5 | 2–5 | | 1–3 | 0–2 | 0–2 |
| Grevenmacher | 0–0 | 1–5 | 2–0 | | 1–4 | 2–1 |
| Jeunesse Esch | 4–4 | 1–0 | 5–1 | 1–1 | | 0–2 |
| Union Luxembourg | 2–0 | 4–0 | 2–0 | 1–1 | 8–2 | |

Legend: Blue = home team win; Yellow = draw; Red = away team win.

=== Relegation/Promotion stage ===
==== Group A ====
===== Table =====
| Pos | Team | Pld | W | D | L | GF | GA | GD | Pts |
|---|---|---|---|---|---|---|---|---|---|
| 1 | CA Spora Luxembourg | 10 | 6 | 1 | 3 | 30 | 16 | +14 | 19 |
| 2 | FA Red Boys Differdange | 10 | 6 | 1 | 3 | 26 | 16 | +10 | 19 |
| 3 | FC Swift Hesperange | 10 | 6 | 1 | 3 | 25 | 16 | +9 | 19 |
| 4 | CS Hollerich | 10 | 5 | 2 | 3 | 24 | 21 | +3 | 17 |
| 5 | FC Sporting Mertzig | 10 | 2 | 2 | 6 | 17 | 33 | −16 | 8 |
| 6 | Young Boys Diekirch | 10 | 1 | 1 | 8 | 6 | 26 | −20 | 4 |

Source: rsssf.com

==== Group B ====
===== Table =====
| Pos | Team | Pld | W | D | L | GF | GA | GD | Pts |
|---|---|---|---|---|---|---|---|---|---|
| 1 | FC Aris Bonnevoie | 10 | 8 | 2 | 0 | 31 | 8 | +23 | 26 |
| 2 | CS Pétange | 10 | 4 | 4 | 2 | 13 | 8 | +5 | 16 |
| 3 | FC Koeppchen Wormeldange | 10 | 5 | 2 | 3 | 18 | 24 | −6 | 17 |
| 4 | FC Etzella Ettelbruck | 10 | 2 | 3 | 5 | 16 | 16 | 0 | 9 |
| 5 | CS Sanem | 10 | 2 | 3 | 5 | 12 | 16 | −4 | 9 |
| 6 | AS Differdange | 10 | 0 | 4 | 6 | 8 | 26 | −18 | 4 |

Source: rsssf.com
