= 1981–82 Luxembourg National Division =

Luxembourg National Division
- Season: 1981–82

The 1981–82 Luxembourg National Division was the 68th season of top level association football in Luxembourg.

== Overview ==
It was performed in 12 teams, and FC Avenir Beggen won the championship.

== League standings ==
Pos	Team	Pld	W	D	L	GF	GA	GD	Pts
1	FC Avenir Beggen	22	17	2	3	59	16	+43	36
2	FC Progrès Niedercorn	22	13	6	3	41	19	+22	32
3	Jeunesse Esch	22	11	7	4	55	33	+22	29
4	FA Red Boys Differdange	22	12	3	7	45	29	+16	27
5	Union Luxembourg	22	11	4	7	38	38	0	26
6	Alliance Dudelange	22	10	5	7	41	36	+5	25
7	FC Wiltz 71	22	8	5	9	32	30	+2	21
8	CS Grevenmacher	22	8	3	11	21	32	−11	19
9	FC Aris Bonnevoie	22	4	7	11	23	44	−21	15
10	FC Olympique Eischen	22	5	4	13	22	41	−19	14
11	Jeunesse Hautcharage	22	3	4	15	20	48	−28	10
12	CA Spora Luxembourg	22	2	6	14	18	49	−31	10

Source: rsssf.com

== Results ==
Home \ Away	ALD	ARI	AVE	GRE	JEU	HAU	OLY	PRO	RBD	SPO	UNI	WIL
Alliance Dudelange		1–4	0–1	1–4	2–2	6–0	4–0	2–1	1–2	1–1	1–4	3–0
Aris Bonnevoie	1–1		1–3	1–0	2–2	2–1	0–1	3–3	2–3	1–1	0–4	0–0
Avenir Beggen	4–0	4–0		3–0	5–1	1–1	4–0	1–2	4–3	6–1	3–0	3–0
Grevenmacher	1–4	0–1	1–2		1–1	2–1	1–0	1–0	3–0	0–0	2–1	2–1
Jeunesse Esch	2–2	4–1	3–1	3–2		2–1	6–2	2–2	0–2	2–0	1–2	2–2
Jeunesse Hautcharage	0–1	2–1	0–1	0–0	1–6		2–1	0–1	1–4	2–1	0–1	2–3
Olympique Eischen	1–2	3–0	1–2	2–0	0–4	1–1		0–0	1–1	3–3	2–0	0–3
Progrès Niederkorn	2–0	2–2	1–0	5–0	1–1	3–1	2–0		1–0	1–0	2–2	3–0
Red Boys Differdange	0–1	1–0	0–4	1–0	4–1	5–1	2–1	0–1		4–1	1–1	0–0
Spora Luxembourg	3–4	0–0	0–3	0–1	0–4	2–0	1–2	0–3	0–5		2–3	1–0
Union Luxembourg	2–2	3–0	0–3	1–0	0–4	2–2	2–1	4–3	1–5	3–0		2–0
Wiltz 71	1–2	5–1	1–1	4–0	0–2	2–1	1–0	0–2	4–2	1–1	4–0	

Legend: Blue = home team win; Yellow = draw; Red = away team win.
