= 1993–94 Luxembourg National Division =

Luxembourg National Division
- Season: 1993–94
- Champions: FC Avenir Beggen (6th title)
- Relegated: CS Fola Esch

The 1993–94 Luxembourg National Division was the 80th season of top level association football in Luxembourg.

== Overview ==
It was performed in 10 teams, and FC Avenir Beggen won the championship.

== First phase ==
=== Table ===
Pos	Team	Pld	W	D	L	GF	GA	GD	Pts	Qualification
1	FC Avenir Beggen	18	12	3	3	48	20	+28	27	Qualification to championship stage
2	CS Grevenmacher	18	11	4	3	34	15	+19	26	Qualification to championship stage
3	Jeunesse Esch	18	8	8	2	21	9	+12	24	Qualification to championship stage
4	Union Luxembourg	18	10	2	6	27	22	+5	22	Qualification to championship stage
5	F91 Dudelange	18	7	5	6	34	28	+6	19	Qualification to championship stage
6	FC Aris Bonnevoie	18	4	7	7	19	25	−6	15	Qualification to championship stage
7	CS Pétange	18	4	6	8	32	37	−5	14	Qualification to relegation stage
8	CS Fola Esch	18	3	7	8	20	33	−13	13	Qualification to relegation stage
9	CA Spora Luxembourg	18	5	2	11	20	38	−18	12	Qualification to relegation stage
10	FA Red Boys Differdange	18	2	4	12	24	52	−28	8	Qualification to relegation stage

Source: rsssf.com

=== Results ===
Home \ Away	ARI	AVE	DUD	FOL	GRE	JEU	PÉT	RBD	SPO	UNI
Aris Bonnevoie		0–4	1–1	0–0	0–0	0–0	2–0	4–1	4–2	0–3
Avenir Beggen	4–0		2–1	3–1	2–0	1–1	3–1	6–0	0–0	3–0
F91 Dudelange	2–2	2–3		3–2	3–4	0–0	4–2	3–2	1–2	2–1
Fola Esch	1–0	0–0	1–5		0–4	0–1	2–2	4–2	2–1	1–1
Grevenmacher	1–1	1–2	1–0	3–0		2–1	2–2	3–1	3–1	2–0
Jeunesse Esch	1–0	2–0	0–0	0–0	0–0		1–0	4–1	2–1	0–1
Pétange	3–0	4–3	1–1	2–2	0–4	1–1		1–1	7–0	0–3
Red Boys Differdange	1–1	2–4	1–2	4–4	1–2	1–5	2–1		1–3	3–2
Spora Luxembourg	1–0	2–6	0–4	3–0	0–2	0–0	2–3	2–1		1–2
Union Luxembourg	0–4	3–2	3–0	1–0	1–0	1–2	4–2	0–0	1–0	

Legend: Blue = home team win; Yellow = draw; Red = away team win.

== Second phase ==
=== Championship stage ===
==== Table ====
Pos	Team	Pld	W	D	L	GF	GA	GD	BP	Pts
1	FC Avenir Beggen	10	7	1	2	15	5	+10	13.5	28.5
2	CS Grevenmacher	10	5	1	4	11	9	+2	13	24
3	Union Luxembourg	10	5	2	3	12	8	+4	11	23
4	Jeunesse Esch	10	2	2	6	6	14	−8	12	18
5	FC Aris Bonnevoie	10	4	1	5	9	11	−2	7.5	16.5
6	F91 Dudelange	10	3	1	6	7	13	−6	9.5	16.5

Source: rsssf.com

==== Results ====
Home \ Away	ARI	AVE	DUD	GRE	JEU	UNI
Aris Bonnevoie		0–1	2–5	1–0	0–4	0–2
Avenir Beggen	1–3		3–1	4–0	1–1	4–0
F91 Dudelange	1–4	3–2		0–2	1–1	0–2
Grevenmacher	2–0	1–4	3–1		2–1	1–1
Jeunesse Esch	0–1	2–4	3–1	0–1		0–2
Union Luxembourg	1–1	1–4	0–1	1–0	2–1	

Legend: Blue = home team win; Yellow = draw; Red = away team win.

=== Relegation/Promotion stage ===
==== Group A ====
===== Table =====
Pos	Team	Pld	W	D	L	GF	GA	GD	Pts
1	CA Spora Luxembourg	10	7	2	1	26	12	+14	23
2	FC Wiltz 71	10	8	0	2	23	15	+8	24
3	CS Pétange	10	5	1	4	17	15	+2	16
4	FC Sporting Mertzig	10	5	0	5	21	18	+3	15
5	FC Etzella Ettelbruck	10	2	1	7	18	27	−9	7
6	Jeunesse Wasserbillig	10	1	0	9	9	27	−18	3

Source: rsssf.com

==== Group B ====
===== Table =====
Pos	Team	Pld	W	D	L	GF	GA	GD	Pts
1	FC Swift Hesperange	10	7	0	3	20	12	+8	21
2	FA Red Boys Differdange	10	5	2	3	17	16	+1	17
3	FC Koeppchen Wormeldange	10	3	5	2	15	11	+4	14
4	CS Fola Esch	10	4	2	4	18	17	+1	14
5	FC Rodange 91	10	2	3	5	10	16	−6	9
6	US Rumelange	10	2	2	6	11	19	−8	8

Source: rsssf.com
