= 1996–97 Luxembourg National Division =

Luxembourg National Division
- Season: 1996–97
- Champions: Jeunesse Esch (24th titles)
- Relegated: Aris Bonnevoie; Rodange 91
- Champions League: Jeunesse Esch
- UEFA Cup: Grevenmacher
- Cup Winners' Cup: Union Luxembourg
- Matches: 132
- Goals: 441 (3.34 per match)
- Top goalscorer: Mikhail Zaritskiy (19 goals)
- Biggest home win: Jeunesse Esch 7-0 Rumelange
- Biggest away win: Sporting Mertzig 1-7 Jeunesse Esch; US Rumelange 0-6 Union Luxembourg
- Highest scoring: Rumelange 3-7 Spora
- Longest unbeaten run: Jeunesse Esch (22 Matches)

The 1996–97 Luxembourg National Division was the 83rd season of top level association football in Luxembourg.

== Overview ==
It was performed in 12 teams, and Jeunesse Esch won the championship.

== League standings ==
Pos	Team	Pld	W	D	L	GF	GA	GD	Pts	Qualification or relegation
1	Jeunesse Esch (C)	22	17	5	0	56	11	+45	56	Qualification to Champions League first qualifying round
2	Grevenmacher	22	15	5	2	56	20	+36	50	Qualification to UEFA Cup first qualifying round
3	Union Luxembourg	22	10	8	4	44	23	+21	38	Qualification to Cup Winners' Cup qualifying round
4	Avenir Beggen	22	11	5	6	45	27	+18	38	
5	Wiltz 71	22	11	3	8	32	40	−8	36	
6	Sporting Mertzig	22	8	8	6	45	39	+6	32	
7	Hobscheid	22	7	5	10	23	42	−19	26	
8	Spora Luxembourg	22	6	5	11	33	40	−7	23	
9	F91 Dudelange	22	6	4	12	27	43	−16	22	
10	Rumelange	22	5	3	14	33	59	−26	18	
11	Rodange 91 (R)	22	4	4	14	25	42	−17	16	Relegation to Luxembourg Division of Honour
12	Aris Bonnevoie (R)	22	2	5	15	22	55	−33	11	Relegation to Luxembourg Division of Honour

Source: rsssf.com
(C) Champions; (R) Relegated

== Results ==
Home \ Away	ARI	AVE	DUD	GRE	HOB	JEU	ROD	RUM	SPO	MER	UNI	WIL
Aris Bonnevoie		3–1	3–1	1–3	1–1	0–3	1–0	5–1	1–0	2–2	1–0	5–0
Avenir Beggen	0–4		4–0	2–6	0–0	0–1	0–2	2–1	0–3	2–2	1–2	0–0
F91 Dudelange	1–1	2–1		0–1	0–1	2–2	1–0	1–3	2–1	1–1	0–2	1–3
Grevenmacher	0–0	3–3	3–1		6–1	0–0	3–1	5–1	3–0	3–1	0–2	4–0
Hobscheid	0–5	2–1	1–4	0–4		0–2	4–2	1–0	3–1	1–1	1–1	2–1
Jeunesse Esch	2–1	1–0	4–0	0–0	3–1		2–0	7–0	4–1	2–0	1–1	3–1
Rodange 91	1–2	5–1	2–1	1–1	2–0	0–1		2–4	3–3	1–1	0–2	0–1
Rumelange	0–0	3–0	0–3	1–4	4–0	0–2	4–1		3–7	2–3	0–6	1–3
Spora Luxembourg	3–2	1–1	0–1	0–2	0–2	0–2	1–0	1–1		2–2	1–3	2–1
Sporting Mertzig	4–1	5–1	6–3	3–0	1–0	1–7	5–0	2–1	1–4		1–2	1–2
Union Luxembourg	4–1	5–0	1–1	1–2	2–2	3–3	2–0	2–2	1–1	1–1		1–2
Wiltz 71	0–5	4–2	3–1	1–3	1–0	0–4	2–2	2–1	2–1	1–1	2–0	

Legend: Blue = home team win; Yellow = draw; Red = away team win.
