= 1961–62 Luxembourg National Division =

Luxembourg National Division
- Season: 1961–62
- Champions: Union Luxembourg (2nd title)
- Matches: 132
- Goals: 503 (3.81 per match)
- Highest scoring: Alliance Dudelange 11–1 US Dudelange

The 1961–62 Luxembourg National Division was the 48th season of top level association football in Luxembourg.

== Overview ==
It was performed in 12 teams, and Union Luxembourg won the championship.

== League standings ==
Pos	Team	Pld	W	D	L	GF	GA	GD	Pts
1	Union Luxembourg	22	18	3	1	48	19	+29	39
2	Alliance Dudelange	22	14	4	4	79	26	+53	32
3	CA Spora Luxembourg	22	10	4	8	54	36	+18	24
4	National Schifflange	22	10	4	8	41	40	+1	24
5	Jeunesse Esch	22	9	5	8	43	34	+9	23
6	FC Aris Bonnevoie	22	10	1	11	42	45	−3	21
7	Stade Dudelange	22	7	6	9	39	47	−8	20
8	FA Red Boys Differdange	22	7	6	9	31	41	−10	20
9	US Dudelange	22	6	6	10	38	59	−21	18
10	CS Fola Esch	22	6	5	11	41	57	−16	17
11	CS Grevenmacher	22	7	3	12	29	44	−15	17
12	US Rumelange	22	3	3	16	18	55	−37	9

Source: rsssf.com

== Results ==
Home \ Away	ALD	ARI	USD	FOL	GRE	JEU	NAT	RBD	RUM	SPO	STD	UNI
Alliance Dudelange		9–1	11–1	8–3	1–1	2–3	7–0	1–1	6–1	3–1	4–0	1–1
Aris Bonnevoie	3–0		1–5	5–0	1–0	1–3	4–1	3–0	2–3	1–4	2–0	1–2
US Dudelange	1–3	1–2		2–3	0–5	2–2	1–8	3–2	1–0	1–0	1–1	1–3
Fola Esch	2–7	1–0	2–2		6–0	0–3	2–1	0–0	1–2	2–2	3–1	1–3
Grevenmacher	0–0	1–0	0–5	3–1		1–3	4–1	0–2	4–2	1–3	1–1	0–1
Jeunesse Esch	0–3	3–4	2–3	2–2	1–2		3–1	1–1	2–1	3–0	1–1	0–1
National Schifflange	2–0	4–0	1–1	2–3	3–2	2–0		1–0	3–0	2–1	0–0	2–2
Red Boys Differdange	2–4	0–5	3–1	3–2	1–0	3–2	0–0		0–0	2–2	1–3	1–2
Rumelange	1–3	0–2	1–1	2–2	1–0	0–4	2–3	0–1		1–4	0–1	0–1
Spora Luxembourg	1–0	5–2	1–1	4–2	2–3	1–3	6–0	7–1	4–1		3–2	1–2
Stade Dudelange	1–4	1–1	5–3	3–2	4–0	1–0	1–4	2–6	7–0	2–2		0–3
Union Luxembourg	0–2	2–1	3–1	2–1	5–1	2–2	1–0	2–1	3–0	1–0	6–2	

Legend: Blue = home team win; Yellow = draw; Red = away team win.
