= 1986–87 Luxembourg National Division =

Luxembourg National Division
- Season: 1986–87

The 1986–87 Luxembourg National Division was the 73rd season of top level association football in Luxembourg.

== Overview ==
It was performed in 12 teams, and Jeunesse Esch won the championship.

== League standings ==
Pos	Team	Pld	W	D	L	GF	GA	GD	Pts
1	Jeunesse Esch	22	17	4	1	64	14	+50	38
2	FC Avenir Beggen	22	15	5	2	63	27	+36	35
3	CA Spora Luxembourg	22	14	2	6	54	21	+33	30
4	Union Luxembourg	22	12	4	6	51	23	+28	28
5	FC Progrès Niedercorn	22	10	5	7	30	22	+8	25
6	Alliance Dudelange	22	9	2	11	32	50	−18	20
7	FA Red Boys Differdange	22	7	5	10	33	35	−2	19
8	CS Grevenmacher	22	7	4	11	25	46	−21	18
9	FC Olympique Eischen	22	5	6	11	23	50	−27	16
10	FC Swift Hesperange	22	6	3	13	37	51	−14	15
11	FC Wiltz 71	22	3	4	15	24	57	−33	10
12	CS Pétange	22	2	6	14	17	57	−40	10

Source: rsssf.com

== Results ==
Home \ Away	DUD	AVE	GRE	JEU	OLY	PÉT	PRO	RBD	SPO	SWI	UNI	WIL
Alliance Dudelange		1–4	3–0	0–4	4–1	0–0	0–0	1–3	1–5	1–0	0–2	3–2
Avenir Beggen	4–1		5–1	3–1	4–1	1–1	2–0	4–0	1–1	3–1	2–1	1–0
Grevenmacher	3–1	1–4		1–1	0–3	4–2	0–4	0–2	2–3	0–0	1–0	1–0
Jeunesse Esch	7–1	3–0	0–0		6–0	1–0	1–0	4–1	1–0	4–1	2–2	4–1
Olympique Eischen	1–4	1–1	0–3	0–4		2–1	0–2	1–0	1–3	3–1	0–5	2–2
Pétange	0–2	0–7	0–2	0–0	0–0		2–2	0–2	0–2	2–3	1–7	4–1
Progrès Niederkorn	0–1	1–2	4–1	0–3	0–0	1–0		1–1	1–0	0–2	1–1	3–0
Red Boys Differdange	1–0	1–1	6–1	1–3	3–2	1–2	1–2		1–3	3–0	1–2	1–1
Spora Luxembourg	7–1	4–2	2–0	0–3	4–0	5–0	0–2	0–0		6–1	0–1	5–0
Swift Hesperange	1–2	5–5	2–3	0–4	1–1	10–0	0–3	4–2	0–1		1–4	0–3
Union Luxembourg	2–3	1–3	3–0	1–2	1–1	3–1	5–0	0–0	3–0	1–2		4–2
Wiltz 71	3–2	1–4	1–1	2–6	1–3	1–1	0–3	3–2	0–3	0–2	0–2	

Legend: Blue = home team win; Yellow = draw; Red = away team win.
