= 1991–92 Luxembourg National Division =

Luxembourg National Division
- Season: 1991–92

The 1991–92 Luxembourg National Division was the 78th season of top level association football in Luxembourg.

== Overview ==
It was performed in 10 teams, and Union Luxembourg won the championship.

== First phase ==
=== Table ===
Pos	Team	Pld	W	D	L	GF	GA	GD	Pts	Qualification
1	FC Avenir Beggen	18	9	8	1	37	14	+23	26	Qualification to championship stage
2	Jeunesse Esch	18	7	10	1	40	14	+26	24	Qualification to championship stage
3	Union Luxembourg	18	10	4	4	39	22	+17	24	Qualification to championship stage
4	CA Spora Luxembourg	18	8	7	3	26	17	+9	23	Qualification to championship stage
5	FC Aris Bonnevoie	18	5	7	6	25	25	0	17	Qualification to championship stage
6	CS Grevenmacher	18	6	4	8	26	31	−5	16	Qualification to championship stage
7	FA Red Boys Differdange	18	5	6	7	31	38	−7	16	Qualification to relegation stage
8	FC Swift Hesperange	18	5	5	8	28	37	−9	15	Qualification to relegation stage
9	FC Koeppchen Wormeldange	18	2	6	10	14	43	−29	10	Qualification to relegation stage
10	FC Wiltz 71	18	3	3	12	21	46	−25	9	Qualification to relegation stage

Source: rsssf.com

=== Results ===
Home \ Away	ARI	AVE	GRE	JEU	KOE	RBD	SPO	SWI	UNI	WIL
Aris Bonnevoie		0–3	0–0	2–2	0–1	3–3	0–0	4–1	2–0	4–0
Avenir Beggen	1–0		3–0	2–2	1–1	5–1	0–0	3–0	2–2	0–0
CS Grevenmacher	2–1	1–5		0–3	2–0	2–1	0–2	4–1	1–2	3–1
Jeunesse Esch	5–0	1–1	1–1		6–0	0–0	0–0	6–0	4–2	8–1
Koeppchen Wormeldange	1–1	2–1	0–0	0–3		1–3	0–0	1–1	0–4	1–1
Red Boys Differdange	0–5	2–3	2–1	0–0	6–2		1–1	1–2	2–2	3–2
Spora Luxembourg	4–0	1–1	2–1	2–2	2–0	1–2		0–3	3–1	3–1
Swift Hesperange	1–1	1–1	3–3	0–0	6–2	2–0	1–2		1–3	2–1
Union Luxembourg	0–0	0–2	4–1	0–0	3–0	4–2	3–0	4–1		3–0
FC Wiltz 71	1–2	0–3	0–4	2–0	3–2	2–2	1–3	4–1	1–2	

Legend: Blue = home team win; Yellow = draw; Red = away team win.

== Second phase ==
=== Championship stage ===
==== Table ====
Pos	Team	Pld	W	D	L	GF	GA	GD	BP	Pts
1	Union Luxembourg	10	7	2	1	16	6	+10	12	28
2	FC Avenir Beggen	10	5	3	2	17	8	+9	13	26
3	CA Spora Luxembourg	10	5	2	3	15	17	−2	11.5	23.5
4	Jeunesse Esch	10	4	1	5	16	14	+2	12	21
5	FC Aris Bonnevoie	10	2	2	6	10	16	−6	8.5	14.5
6	CS Grevenmacher	10	1	2	7	8	21	−13	8	12

Source: rsssf.com

==== Results ====
Home \ Away	ARI	AVE	GRE	JEU	SPO	UNI
Aris Bonnevoie		1–4	0–1	2–1	2–3	0–1
Avenir Beggen	1–0		2–0	3–1	1–1	0–0
CS Grevenmacher	1–1	0–0		1–2	2–3	2–5
Jeunesse Esch	1–1	3–1	3–1		4–0	1–2
Spora Luxembourg	0–3	0–4	4–0	2–0		1–0
Union Luxembourg	3–0	2–1	1–0	1–0	1–1	

Legend: Blue = home team win; Yellow = draw; Red = away team win.

=== Relegation/Promotion stage ===
==== Group A ====
===== Table =====
Pos	Team	Pld	W	D	L	GF	GA	GD	Pts
1	FA Red Boys Differdange	10	6	2	2	26	18	+8	20
2	F91 Dudelange	10	5	2	3	26	18	+8	17
3	FC Progrès Niedercorn	10	2	5	3	12	12	0	11
4	AS Differdange	10	3	3	4	15	19	−4	12
5	CS Sanem	10	4	1	5	14	21	−7	13
6	FC Koeppchen Wormeldange	10	2	3	5	13	18	−5	9

Source: rsssf.com

===== Results =====
Home \ Away	DIF	DUD	KOE	PRO	RBD	SAN
AS Differdange		0–0	1–1	1–1	3–4	5–2
F91 Dudelange	5–0		5–4	3–0	6–2	1–4
Koeppchen Wormeldange	0–1	0–3		1–1	2–1	2–3
Progrès Niederkorn	2–0	2–2	0–0		0–1	4–0
Red Boys Differdange	4–2	4–1	3–1	2–2		4–0
Sanem	0–2	2–0	0–2	2–0	1–1	

Legend: Blue = home team win; Yellow = draw; Red = away team win.

==== Group B ====
===== Table =====
Pos	Team	Pld	W	D	L	GF	GA	GD	Pts
1	FC Etzella Ettelbruck	10	4	4	2	20	14	+6	16
2	CS Fola Esch	10	4	4	2	19	13	+6	16
3	FC Swift Hesperange	10	4	3	3	23	17	+6	15
4	FC Wiltz 71	10	3	4	3	20	19	+1	13
5	CS Hollerich	10	3	4	3	17	18	−1	13
6	Jeunesse Hautcharage	10	1	3	6	11	29	−18	6

Source: rsssf.com

===== Results =====
Home \ Away	ETZ	FOL	HOL	HAU	SWI	WIL
Etzella Ettelbruck		1–1	4–1	2–0	3–3	2–0
Fola Esch	2–2		1–1	3–0	1–3	1–0
Hollerich	2–1	2–3		3–0	0–2	4–4
Jeunesse Hautcharage	1–1	0–4	2–2		0–7	0–1
Swift Hesperange	2–3	2–1	0–1	2–2		2–2
Wiltz 71	2–1	2–2	1–1	4–6	4–0	

Legend: Blue = home team win; Yellow = draw; Red = away team win.
