= 1985–86 Luxembourg National Division =

Luxembourg National Division
- Season: 1985–86

The 1985–86 Luxembourg National Division was the 72nd season of top level association football in Luxembourg.

== Overview ==
It was performed in 12 teams, and FC Avenir Beggen won the championship.

== League standings ==
| Pos | Team | Pld | W | D | L | GF | GA | GD | Pts |
|---|---|---|---|---|---|---|---|---|---|
| 1 | FC Avenir Beggen | 22 | 14 | 5 | 3 | 62 | 21 | +41 | 33 |
| 2 | Jeunesse Esch | 22 | 14 | 4 | 4 | 46 | 23 | +23 | 32 |
| 3 | CA Spora Luxembourg | 22 | 12 | 7 | 3 | 41 | 22 | +19 | 31 |
| 4 | CS Grevenmacher | 22 | 11 | 4 | 7 | 45 | 38 | +7 | 26 |
| 5 | Alliance Dudelange | 22 | 9 | 8 | 5 | 36 | 39 | −3 | 26 |
| 6 | Union Luxembourg | 22 | 10 | 3 | 9 | 49 | 35 | +14 | 23 |
| 7 | FA Red Boys Differdange | 22 | 8 | 7 | 7 | 46 | 38 | +8 | 23 |
| 8 | FC Olympique Eischen | 22 | 8 | 4 | 10 | 39 | 41 | −2 | 20 |
| 9 | FC Swift Hesperange | 22 | 5 | 7 | 10 | 30 | 45 | −15 | 17 |
| 10 | FC Progrès Niedercorn | 22 | 6 | 4 | 12 | 27 | 37 | −10 | 16 |
| 11 | FC Aris Bonnevoie | 22 | 6 | 3 | 13 | 40 | 50 | −10 | 15 |
| 12 | Stade Dudelange | 22 | 0 | 2 | 20 | 12 | 84 | −72 | 2 |

Source: rsssf.com

== Results ==
| Home \ Away | ALD | ARI | AVE | GRE | JEU | OLY | PRO | RBD | SPO | STD | SWI | UNI |
|---|---|---|---|---|---|---|---|---|---|---|---|---|
| Alliance Dudelange | | 1–1 | 1–2 | 5–3 | 3–1 | 1–1 | 0–0 | 2–1 | 2–2 | 3–2 | 3–1 | 2–1 |
| Aris Bonnevoie | 0–1 | | 3–1 | 0–2 | 1–3 | 1–4 | 6–2 | 2–4 | 0–4 | 3–0 | 5–2 | 2–3 |
| Avenir Beggen | 6–0 | 2–0 | | 5–1 | 1–1 | 5–0 | 2–0 | 3–3 | 4–2 | 5–0 | 3–0 | 1–0 |
| Grevenmacher | 5–1 | 2–1 | 1–1 | | 3–2 | 2–3 | 1–0 | 2–2 | 0–0 | 3–2 | 5–0 | 2–1 |
| Jeunesse Esch | 6–2 | 1–1 | 2–0 | 3–1 | | 4–2 | 3–1 | 2–1 | 2–1 | 3–0 | 2–0 | 2–3 |
| Olympique Eischen | 1–2 | 5–0 | 1–1 | 0–2 | 1–4 | | 4–3 | 4–2 | 1–1 | 4–0 | 0–1 | 1–4 |
| Progrès Niederkorn | 1–0 | 1–5 | 1–0 | 1–0 | 0–1 | 0–1 | | 0–0 | 0–1 | 8–1 | 2–1 | 2–2 |
| Red Boys Differdange | 1–1 | 3–2 | 1–5 | 3–2 | 0–0 | 2–2 | 1–0 | | 2–0 | 5–0 | 1–3 | 1–3 |
| Spora Luxembourg | 1–1 | 3–0 | 1–1 | 1–1 | 1–0 | 2–0 | 4–2 | 2–1 | | 3–0 | 2–1 | 2–1 |
| Stade Dudelange | 1–3 | 3–3 | 0–5 | 0–4 | 0–2 | 1–3 | 0–1 | 0–5 | 0–4 | | 1–1 | 1–7 |
| Swift Hesperange | 2–2 | 3–1 | 2–7 | 1–2 | 0–0 | 1–0 | 2–2 | 2–2 | 1–1 | 4–0 | | 1–1 |
| Union Luxembourg | 0–0 | 0–3 | 1–2 | 6–1 | 1–2 | 2–1 | 2–0 | 1–5 | 2–3 | 5–0 | 3–1 | |

Legend: Blue = home team win; Yellow = draw; Red = away team win.
