= 1983–84 Luxembourg National Division =

Luxembourg National Division
- Season: 1983–84

The 1983–84 Luxembourg National Division was the 70th season of top level association football in Luxembourg.

== Overview ==
It was performed in 12 teams, and FC Avenir Beggen won the championship.

== League standings ==
Pos	Team	Pld	W	D	L	GF	GA	GD	Pts
1	FC Avenir Beggen	22	14	5	3	52	23	+29	33
2	FA Red Boys Differdange	22	14	4	4	43	17	+26	32
3	FC Progrès Niedercorn	22	13	5	4	51	24	+27	31
4	Jeunesse Esch	22	13	1	8	58	33	+25	27
5	CA Spora Luxembourg	22	12	1	9	38	32	+6	25
6	Union Luxembourg	22	8	7	7	33	33	0	23
7	FC Aris Bonnevoie	22	6	7	9	42	38	+4	19
8	US Rumelange	22	6	7	9	31	31	0	19
9	Stade Dudelange	22	6	6	10	22	37	−15	18
10	FC Wiltz 71	22	7	2	13	29	45	−16	16
11	CS Grevenmacher	22	4	4	14	30	60	−30	12
12	FC Etzella Ettelbruck	22	3	3	16	20	76	−56	9

Source: rsssf.com

== Results ==
Home \ Away	ARI	AVE	ETZ	GRE	JEU	PRO	RBD	RUM	SPO	STD	UNI	WIL
Aris Bonnevoie		2–4	9–0	8–1	1–3	0–4	1–0	1–2	1–2	2–2	1–1	2–1
Avenir Beggen	1–0		4–1	2–0	4–0	4–3	0–3	0–0	0–1	0–0	3–1	2–1
Etzella Ettelbruck	1–4	1–5		1–4	0–6	2–5	0–1	3–1	0–1	1–4	0–0	2–0
Grevenmacher	2–2	2–2	5–1		0–3	0–1	0–4	3–2	1–2	3–1	1–4	0–1
Jeunesse Esch	4–3	1–3	7–2	7–1		1–1	3–2	2–3	4–1	1–2	4–1	2–0
Progrès Niederkorn	7–2	1–2	4–0	1–1	1–0		0–1	1–1	3–0	3–0	2–1	2–0
Red Boys Differdange	0–0	2–1	0–1	4–0	1–0	2–2		1–0	2–1	3–0	4–0	2–0
Rumelange	0–1	0–3	0–0	4–0	2–3	1–3	3–3		2–0	3–0	1–1	4–1
Spora Luxembourg	1–0	1–4	7–0	4–2	0–2	3–1	3–0	0–0		4–0	2–4	1–0
Stade Dudelange	0–0	0–0	3–1	1–1	1–3	1–1	0–2	2–0	1–2		2–0	2–1
Union Luxembourg	1–0	2–4	0–0	2–1	3–2	1–2	1–1	1–1	2–0	2–0		1–1
Wiltz 71	1–1	0–4	6–3	3–2	1–0	1–3	1–5	2–1	3–2	4–0	1–4	

Legend: Blue = home team win; Yellow = draw; Red = away team win.
