= Gilbert Dresch =

Luxembourgish footballer and manager

Personal information
- Full name: Gilbert Dresch
- Date of birth: 14 September 1954 (age 72)
- Position: Defender

Senior career*
Years	Team	Apps	(Gls)
1974–1989	Avenir Beggen		

International career
1975–1987	Luxembourg	63	(1)

Managerial career
- 2002–2003: Avenir Beggen
- * Club domestic league appearances and goals

Gilbert Dresch (born 14 September 1954) was a Luxembourgish former footballer and manager. A defender, he played his entire club career for Avenir Beggen and played 63 times for the Luxembourg national football team.

== Career ==
Dresch won three Luxembourg National Division titles and three Luxembourg Cups while playing for Avenir Beggen. He later managed Avenir Beggen for one season.

== International goals ==
Scores and results list Luxembourg's goal tally first, score column indicates score after each Dresch goal.

International goals by date, venue, opponent, score, result and competition
No.	Date	Venue	Opponent	Score	Result	Competition
1	11 March 1984	Stade de la Frontière, Esch-sur-Alzette, Luxembourg	Turkey	1–0	1–3	Friendly

== Honours ==
- Luxembourg National Division: 3

1981–82, 1983–84, 1985–86

- Luxembourg Cup: 3

1982–83, 1983–84, 1986–87
