= 1995–96 Luxembourg National Division =

Luxembourg National Division
- Season: 1995–96

The 1995–96 Luxembourg National Division was the 82nd season of top level association football in Luxembourg.

== Overview ==
It was performed in 12 teams, and Jeunesse Esch won the championship.

== League standings ==
Pos	Team	Pld	W	D	L	GF	GA	GD	Pts	Qualification or relegation
1	Jeunesse Esch (C)	22	15	3	4	59	19	+40	48	Qualification to UEFA Cup preliminary round
2	Grevenmacher	22	14	5	3	44	19	+25	47	Qualification to UEFA Cup preliminary round
3	Union Luxembourg	22	12	6	4	43	18	+25	42	Qualification to Cup Winners' Cup qualifying round
4	F91 Dudelange	22	11	5	6	43	23	+20	38	
5	Sporting Mertzig	22	11	4	7	32	29	+3	37	
6	Avenir Beggen	22	9	4	9	38	33	+5	31	
7	Spora Luxembourg	22	7	6	9	35	34	+1	27	
8	Rodange 91	22	7	3	12	22	36	−14	24	
9	Wiltz 71	22	7	3	12	25	41	−16	24	
10	Aris Bonnevoie	22	5	6	11	32	52	−20	21	
11	Pétange (R)	22	6	1	15	20	46	−26	19	Relegation to Luxembourg Division of Honour
12	Red Boys Differdange (R)	22	3	4	15	29	72	−43	13	Relegation to Luxembourg Division of Honour

Source: rsssf.com
(C) Champions; (R) Relegated

== Results ==
Home \ Away	ARI	AVE	DUD	GRE	JEU	PÉT	RBD	ROD	SPO	MER	UNI	WIL
Aris Bonnevoie		0–5	0–1	3–3	1–2	1–1	5–1	0–1	0–4	1–3	1–0	2–4
Avenir Beggen	1–1		3–2	1–0	2–6	2–0	1–1	3–0	3–2	0–1	0–1	3–1
F91 Dudelange	0–0	2–0		0–3	5–0	4–1	2–2	5–0	1–0	3–4	1–1	3–0
Grevenmacher	3–1	6–4	2–0		1–1	2–1	1–2	1–0	1–1	2–1	0–0	1–0
Jeunesse Esch	7–1	3–0	1–0	0–1		3–0	3–0	3–2	5–0	3–0	0–1	2–0
Pétange	0–2	2–1	0–1	1–5	1–3		1–0	3–1	0–1	1–0	0–8	1–0
Red Boys Differdange	4–4	0–4	0–4	1–6	1–0	7–1		0–3	2–7	0–4	0–7	1–3
Rodange 91	0–2	2–0	2–2	0–0	0–4	1–0	3–0		1–3	2–2	0–3	1–0
Spora Luxembourg	6–1	1–1	2–2	0–2	1–6	1–0	1–1	0–1		3–1	0–1	1–3
Sporting Mertzig	2–1	0–3	2–1	0–2	0–0	2–1	3–2	1–0	1–0		0–2	0–0
Union Luxembourg	3–3	2–1	0–2	1–2	1–1	1–0	5–2	1–0	0–0	2–2		1–2
Wiltz 71	1–2	0–0	0–2	1–0	1–6	0–5	4–2	3–2	1–1	0–3	1–2	

Legend: Blue = home team win; Yellow = draw; Red = away team win.
