= 1976–77 Luxembourg National Division =

Luxembourg National Division
- Season: 1976–77

The 1976–77 Luxembourg National Division was the 63rd season of top level football in Luxembourg.

== Overview ==
It was performed in 12 teams, and Jeunesse Esch won the championship.

== League standings ==
Pos	Team	Pld	W	D	L	GF	GA	GD	Pts
1	Jeunesse Esch	22	16	2	4	42	21	+21	34
2	FC Progrès Niedercorn	22	15	2	5	50	31	+19	32
3	FA Red Boys Differdange	22	11	5	6	45	34	+11	27
4	Stade Dudelange	22	11	2	9	46	34	+12	24
5	FC Avenir Beggen	22	8	6	8	35	40	−5	22
6	Chiers Rodange	22	8	4	10	26	27	−1	20
7	Alliance Dudelange	22	8	4	10	30	33	−3	20
8	FC Etzella Ettelbruck	22	6	8	8	40	46	−6	20
9	US Rumelange	22	6	7	9	29	29	0	19
10	CS Grevenmacher	22	8	2	12	32	43	−11	18
11	FC Aris Bonnevoie	22	5	4	13	26	41	−15	14
12	FC Red Black Pfaffenthal	22	5	4	13	31	53	−22	14

Source: rsssf.com

== Results ==
Home \ Away	AVE	ALD	ARI	CHI	ETZ	GRE	JEU	PRO	RBP	RBD	RUM	STD
Avenir Beggen		2–1	1–4	1–0	3–3	2–2	0–0	2–3	3–0	1–0	4–2	2–2
Alliance Dudelange	1–1		2–2	1–0	3–0	1–3	1–2	2–3	3–2	0–1	2–1	0–4
Aris Bonnevoie	0–1	1–2		0–0	2–2	0–1	1–3	1–2	1–4	1–2	2–1	0–7
Chiers Rodange	2–1	1–2	0–2		1–0	2–0	2–0	2–0	2–1	3–3	0–0	2–0
Etzella Ettelbruck	2–2	2–2	1–1	4–3		4–2	0–4	1–1	2–1	3–0	3–1	1–1
Grevenmacher	3–0	0–2	3–1	3–1	0–2		0–4	0–3	3–1	2–5	1–1	2–0
Jeunesse Esch	4–2	3–1	3–0	1–0	5–1	1–0		0–2	1–0	2–1	2–0	2–1
Progrès Niederkorn	3–0	3–2	0–4	2–0	2–1	3–2	2–3		4–3	3–2	2–0	0–2
Red Black Pfaffenthal	2–5	1–0	1–0	1–1	3–2	1–4	1–2	0–5		2–2	1–1	1–4
Red Boys Differdange	3–0	0–0	3–2	2–1	4–2	3–0	4–0	2–1	1–1		1–1	2–4
Rumelange	3–0	1–0	2–0	1–0	2–2	4–0	0–0	2–2	1–3	1–2		1–2
Stade Dudelange	0–2	0–2	0–1	2–3	3–2	2–1	2–0	0–4	6–1	4–2	0–3	

Legend: Blue = home team win; Yellow = draw; Red = away team win.
