= 1994–95 Luxembourg National Division =

Luxembourg National Division
- Season: 1994–95

The 1994–95 Luxembourg National Division was the 81st season of top level association football in Luxembourg.

== Overview ==
It was performed in 12 teams, and Jeunesse Esch won the championship.

== League standings ==
Pos	Team	Pld	W	D	L	GF	GA	GD	Pts	Qualification or relegation
1	Jeunesse Esch (C)	22	15	5	2	63	17	+46	35	Qualification to UEFA Cup preliminary round
2	Grevenmacher	22	15	5	2	35	12	+23	35	Qualification to Cup Winners' Cup qualifying round
3	Avenir Beggen	22	13	4	5	64	31	+33	30	Qualification to UEFA Cup preliminary round
4	F91 Dudelange	22	10	3	9	41	37	+4	23	
5	Union Luxembourg	22	8	6	8	40	30	+10	22	
6	Wiltz 71	22	7	8	7	36	40	−4	22	
7	Spora Luxembourg	22	7	6	9	38	36	+2	20	
8	Aris Bonnevoie	22	7	5	10	39	45	−6	19	
9	Pétange	22	7	5	10	30	43	−13	19	
10	Red Boys Differdange	22	6	5	11	44	59	−15	17	
11	Swift Hesperange (R)	22	6	4	12	33	58	−25	16	Relegation to Luxembourg Division of Honour
12	Koeppchen Wormeldange (R)	22	1	4	17	13	68	−55	6	Relegation to Luxembourg Division of Honour

Source: rsssf.com
(C) Champions; (R) Relegated

== Results ==
Home \ Away	ARI	AVE	DUD	GRE	JEU	KOE	PÉT	RBD	SPO	SWI	UNI	WIL
Aris Bonnevoie		2–3	4–1	0–1	1–5	4–0	0–0	1–3	1–1	1–0	1–2	2–3
Avenir Beggen	4–0		1–1	1–1	3–2	5–0	4–1	6–0	3–1	5–1	2–3	0–0
F91 Dudelange	1–3	1–3		1–0	1–2	3–1	1–0	3–0	3–0	2–1	4–3	1–1
Grevenmacher	1–0	2–1	2–1		1–2	1–0	2–0	2–1	1–0	0–0	2–0	2–0
Jeunesse Esch	3–2	3–1	2–1	1–1		11–0	2–0	5–1	0–0	2–0	3–3	3–0
Koeppchen Wormeldange	1–3	1–3	0–7	1–1	0–2		0–2	1–1	2–4	1–2	1–0	1–1
Pétange	5–1	1–7	0–0	1–4	0–1	1–0		5–1	1–1	3–1	2–1	0–2
Red Boys Differdange	4–4	2–4	6–1	0–4	0–6	6–0	2–2		2–3	2–2	4–3	6–2
Spora Luxembourg	2–3	0–2	1–2	0–1	1–1	1–0	5–1	1–1		1–4	1–2	3–2
Swift Hesperange	3–4	2–1	3–1	2–4	0–7	2–2	2–3	2–1	1–6		0–5	3–1
Union Luxembourg	0–0	1–1	0–2	0–0	0–0	3–0	4–0	0–1	1–4	4–0		4–1
Wiltz 71	2–2	4–2	2–1	0–2	1–0	5–1	2–2	2–0	2–2	2–2	1–1	

Legend: Blue = home team win; Yellow = draw; Red = away team win.
