= 1970–71 Luxembourg National Division =

Luxembourg National Division
- Season: 1970–71

The 1970–71 Luxembourg National Division was the 57th season of top level association football in Luxembourg.

== Overview ==
It was performed in 12 teams, and Union Luxembourg won the championship.

== League standings ==
Pos	Team	Pld	W	D	L	GF	GA	GD	Pts
1	Union Luxembourg	22	15	7	0	55	24	+31	37
2	FC Aris Bonnevoie	22	12	5	5	51	32	+19	29
3	Jeunesse Esch	22	12	5	5	51	33	+18	29
4	FC Avenir Beggen	22	10	4	8	29	35	−6	24
5	CA Spora Luxembourg	22	8	7	7	38	28	+10	23
6	FA Red Boys Differdange	22	9	3	10	41	40	+1	21
7	US Rumelange	22	8	5	9	36	39	−3	21
8	Alliance Dudelange	22	5	11	6	32	36	−4	21
9	FC Progrès Niedercorn	22	8	4	10	48	51	−3	20
10	SC Tétange	22	6	5	11	30	41	−11	17
11	Stade Dudelange	22	5	4	13	39	55	−16	14
12	CS Grevenmacher	22	1	6	15	26	62	−36	8

Source: rsssf.com

== Results ==
Home \ Away	ALD	ARI	AVE	GRE	JEU	PRO	RBD	RUM	SPO	STD	TÉT	UNI
Alliance Dudelange		0–2	2–1	4–4	2–2	0–2	1–1	2–2	2–2	2–2	1–1	0–0
Aris Bonnevoie	3–2		2–0	4–0	1–1	7–3	2–3	2–1	2–1	2–0	2–2	1–1
Avenir Beggen	0–3	2–1		5–0	3–2	2–1	2–0	1–0	1–1	1–0	2–1	0–3
Grevenmacher	2–3	2–5	0–0		1–2	3–1	1–2	1–1	0–1	0–6	2–3	3–3
Jeunesse Esch	1–0	3–1	4–0	7–1		1–1	2–1	7–1	2–1	2–2	3–0	1–4
Progrès Niederkorn	1–2	3–2	6–2	1–1	3–1		4–2	1–5	2–0	6–2	1–2	2–2
Red Boys Differdange	1–1	3–1	2–0	2–0	0–2	5–3		3–3	1–0	4–1	5–2	0–1
Rumelange	3–0	2–3	0–0	1–0	2–2	4–2	2–1		1–2	2–0	2–0	0–1
Spora Luxembourg	2–2	1–1	1–1	1–1	3–0	2–0	3–0	4–1		4–2	3–5	0–2
Stade Dudelange	1–1	0–3	2–3	5–2	1–2	2–4	3–2	3–0	0–5		3–2	1–3
Tétange	1–2	0–2	0–1	1–0	1–4	0–0	3–1	1–2	1–0	1–1		3–3
Union Luxembourg	2–0	2–2	4–2	4–2	4–0	4–1	3–2	3–1	1–1	4–2	1–0	

Legend: Blue = home team win; Yellow = draw; Red = away team win.
