= Vito Marchione =

Luxembourgish footballer

Personal information
- Date of birth: 16 December 1971 (age 54)
- Position: Forward

Senior career*
Years	Team	Apps	(Gls)
1988–1994	CS Grevenmacher		
1995–1998	Jeunesse Esch		

International career
- Luxembourg U21
1994	Luxembourg	1	(0)
- * Club domestic league appearances and goals

Vito Marchione (born 16 December 1971) is a retired Luxembourgish football striker.
