= 1974–75 Luxembourg National Division =

Luxembourg National Division
- Season: 1974–75

The 1974–75 Luxembourg National Division was the 61st season of top level association football in Luxembourg.

== Overview ==
It was performed in 12 teams, and Jeunesse Esch won the championship.

== League standings ==
Pos	Team	Pld	W	D	L	GF	GA	GD	Pts
1	Jeunesse Esch	22	15	3	4	63	23	+40	33
2	FC Avenir Beggen	22	14	3	5	44	29	+15	31
3	Union Luxembourg	22	10	7	5	40	25	+15	27
4	FA Red Boys Differdange	22	9	6	7	37	34	+3	24
5	US Rumelange	22	7	8	7	32	31	+1	22
6	Alliance Dudelange	22	6	9	7	37	36	+1	21
7	FC Etzella Ettelbruck	22	8	5	9	34	34	0	21
8	FC Progrès Niedercorn	22	8	4	10	34	44	−10	20
9	FC Aris Bonnevoie	22	6	7	9	39	45	−6	19
10	CS Fola Esch	22	8	2	12	40	55	−15	18
11	FC Red Star Merl-Belair	22	4	6	12	20	42	−22	14
12	CA Spora Luxembourg	22	4	6	12	23	45	−22	14

Source: rsssf.com

== Results ==
Home \ Away	ALD	ARI	AVE	ETZ	FOL	JEU	PRO	RBD	RSM	RUM	SPO	UNI
Alliance Dudelange		0–1	3–0	1–2	3–7	2–2	5–1	2–4	3–1	2–0	1–1	1–3
Aris Bonnevoie	1–1		2–2	4–0	3–4	1–2	4–1	1–1	1–2	1–1	1–0	0–2
Avenir Beggen	2–1	4–1		3–0	2–1	3–1	1–0	3–2	3–1	1–1	5–2	0–0
Etzella Ettelbruck	1–2	6–2	0–2		7–0	0–2	1–0	2–0	3–2	2–0	1–1	0–4
Fola Esch	1–2	2–2	1–3	3–1		0–2	1–2	2–5	2–2	2–0	2–1	0–3
Jeunesse Esch	2–2	5–1	2–1	1–3	6–2		5–1	7–1	4–0	0–0	4–0	1–0
Progrès Niederkorn	2–1	2–2	3–2	3–2	4–2	4–1		0–1	3–2	0–1	2–2	1–2
Red Boys Differdange	1–1	5–0	1–0	0–0	2–0	0–1	1–2		0–0	3–2	0–2	3–3
Red Star Merl-Belair	1–1	0–3	4–0	1–1	2–1	0–5	0–0	0–2		0–2	0–1	2–0
Rumelange	1–1	2–2	0–1	0–0	2–3	0–7	2–0	3–1	5–0		4–1	2–2
Spora Luxembourg	0–0	0–4	2–3	2–1	0–2	0–3	2–2	1–1	2–0	2–4		0–3
Union Luxembourg	2–2	3–2	1–3	1–1	1–2	2–0	4–1	2–3	0–0	0–0	2–1	

Legend: Blue = home team win; Yellow = draw; Red = away team win.
