= Aldo Catani =

Luxembourgish footballer

Personal information
- Date of birth: 10 June 1951 (age 75)
- Position: Midfielder

Senior career*
Years	Team	Apps	(Gls)
1969–1970?	Avenir Beggen		
1977?–1979?	Etzella Ettelbruck		
1982–1986	Avenir Beggen		

International career
1978	Luxembourg	1	(0)
- * Club domestic league appearances and goals

Aldo Catani (born 10 June 1951) is a retired Luxembourgish football midfielder.
