= FC Argeș Pitești in European football =

FC Argeș Pitești is a football club from Romania which currently plays in Liga I.

== Statistics by competition ==
Competition	S	P	W	D	L	GF	GA	GD
UEFA Champions League / European Cup	2	8	4	0	4	13	10	+3
UEFA Europa League / UEFA Cup	5	18	7	4	7	29	34	–5
Total	7	26	11	4	11	42	44	–2

== Statistics by country ==
Country	Club	P	W	D	L	GF	GA	GD
Azerbaijan	Baku	2	2	0	0	7	1	+6
Subtotal		2	2	0	0	7	1	+6
Cyprus	APOEL	2	1	1	0	5	1	+4
Subtotal		2	1	1	0	5	1	+4
England	Nottingham Forest	2	0	0	2	1	4	–3
Subtotal		2	0	0	2	1	4	–3
Greece	AEK Athens	2	1	0	1	3	2	+1
Greece	Panathinaikos	2	2	0	0	5	1	+4
Subtotal		4	3	0	1	8	3	+5
Luxembourg	Aris Bonnevoie	2	2	0	0	6	0	+6
Subtotal		2	2	0	0	6	0	+6
Netherlands	Utrecht	2	0	1	1	0	2	–2
Subtotal		2	0	1	1	0	2	–2
Scotland	Aberdeen	2	0	1	1	2	5	–3
Subtotal		2	0	1	1	2	5	–3
Spain	Celta Vigo	2	0	0	2	0	8	–8
Spain	Real Madrid	2	1	0	1	3	4	–1
Spain	Valencia	2	1	0	1	4	6	–2
Subtotal		6	2	0	4	7	18	–11
Turkey	Fenerbahçe	2	0	1	1	2	6	–4
Turkey	İstanbulspor	2	1	0	1	4	4	0
Subtotal		4	1	1	2	6	10	–4
Total		26	11	4	11	42	44	–2

== Statistics by competition ==
Notes for the abbreviations in the tables below:

- 1R: First round
- 2R: Second round
- 3R: Third round
- 1QR: First qualifying round
- 2QR: Second qualifying round

=== UEFA Champions League / European Cup ===
Season	Round	Country	Club	Home	Away	Aggregate
1972–73	1R	Luxembourg	Aris Bonnevoie	4–0	2–0	6–0
1972–73	2R	Spain	Real Madrid	2–1	1–3	3–4
1979–80	1R	Greece	AEK Athens	3–0	0–2	3–2
1979–80	2R	England	Nottingham Forest	1–2	0–2	1–4

=== UEFA Europa League / UEFA Cup ===
Season	Round	Country	Club	Home	Away	Aggregate
1973–74	1R	Turkey	Fenerbahçe	1–1	1–5	2–6
1978–79	1R	Greece	Panathinaikos	3–0	2–1	5–1
1978–79	2R	Spain	Valencia	2–1	2–5	4–6
1980–81	1R	Netherlands	Utrecht	0–0	0–2	0–2
1981–82	1R	Cyprus	APOEL	4–0	1–1	5–1
1981–82	2R	Scotland	Aberdeen	2–2	0–3	2–5
1998–99	1QR	Azerbaijan	Dynamo Baku	5–1	2–0	7–1
1998–99	2QR	Turkey	İstanbulspor	2–0	2–4	4–4 (a)
1998–99	1R	Spain	Celta Vigo	0–1	0–7	0–8

=== Inter-Cities Fairs Cup ===
Season	Round	Country	Club	Home	Away	Aggregate
1966–67	1R	Spain	Sevilla	2–0	2–2	4–2
1966–67	2R	France	Toulouse	5–1	0–3	5–4
1966–67	3R	(Socialist Federal Republic of Yugoslavia) SFR Yugoslavia	Dinamo Zagreb	0–1	0–0	0–1
1967–68	1R	Hungary	Ferencváros	3–1	0–4	3–5
1968–69	1R	Portugal	Leixões	0–0	1–1	1–1 (a)
1968–69	2R	Turkey	Göztepe	3–2	0–3	3–5
