= Kévin Sommer =

French footballer (born 1989)

Personal information
- Date of birth: 11 August 1989 (age 37)
- Place of birth: Mulhouse, France
- Height: 1.88 m (6 ft 2 in)
- Position: Goalkeeper

Team information
- Current team: Jeunesse Esch
- Number: 1

Senior career*
| Years | Team | Apps | (Gls) |
| 2008–2010 | Strasbourg B | | |
| 2009–2010 | Strasbourg | 4 | (0) |
| 2010–2011 | Mulhouse | 10 | (0) |
| 2011–2012 | BX Brussels | 33 | (0) |
| 2012 | RM Hamm Benfica | 13 | (0) |
| 2014 | ASC Biesheim | 11 | (0) |
| 2014–2017 | Mulhouse | 53 | (0) |
| 2017–2020 | Jeunesse Esch | 57 | (0) |
| 2020–2021 | Progrès Niederkorn | 6 | (0) |
| 2021– | Jeunesse Esch | 98 | (0) |
- * Club domestic league appearances and goals as of 13 June 2026

Kévin Sommer (born 11 August 1989) is a French professional footballer who plays as a goalkeeper for Luxembourg side Jeunesse Esch.
