= Gilbert Legrand =

French football manager

Personal information
- Full name: Gilbert Legrand
- Date of death: 1977

Managerial career
- Years: Team
- 1968–1969: Jeunesse Esch
- 1972–1977: Luxembourg

Gilbert Legrand (died 1977) was a French football manager. He managed Jeunesse Esch and the Luxembourg national football team.
