= Reinhold Breu =

German football manager

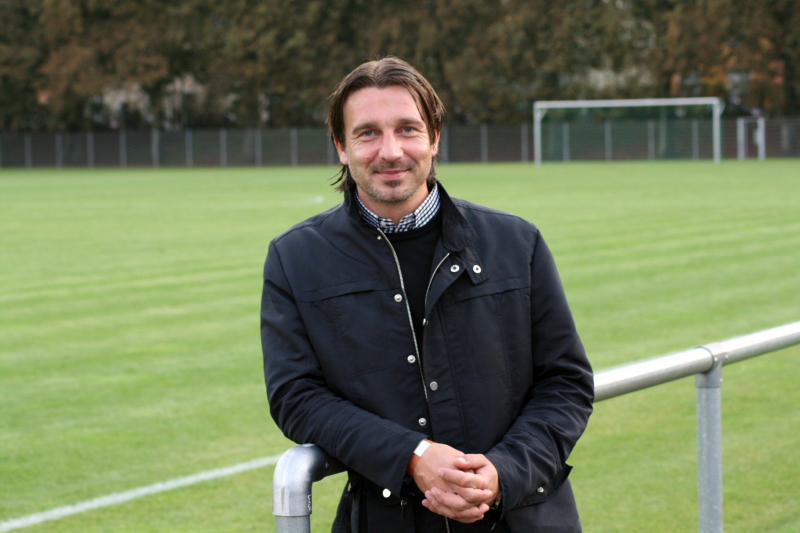
- Breu in 2008

Personal information
- Date of birth: 12 September 1970 (age 56)
- Place of birth: Deggendorf, Germany
- Height: 1.82 m (6 ft 0 in)
- Positions: Midfielder; forward

Team information
- Current team: Lithuania (technical director)

Senior career*
Years	Team	Apps	(Gls)
–1995	SV Lohhof		
1995–1996	1. FC Köln II		
1995–1996	1. FC Köln		
1996–1998	Austria Wien		
1998	First Vienna		
1998–2000	Eintracht Trier		
2000–2002	Wacker Burghausen		

Managerial career
- 2004–2008: Jahn Regensburg II
- 2008–2010: Eintracht Trier II
- 2010: Eintracht Trier
- 2011–2021: Luxembourg (technical director, youth team manager)
- 2021–: Lithuania (technical director)
- 2022: Lithuania (caretaker)
- 2023–: Lithuania U-19 (manager)
- * Club domestic league appearances and goals

Reinhold Breu (born 12 September 1970) is a German football manager and former player who works as technical director of the Lithuania national football team.

== Career ==
Breu spent time in the academy of 1860 Munich. In 1996, he signed for Austria Wien in the Austrian Bundesliga, where he made 33 appearances and scored five goals. After that, he played for First Vienna, Eintracht Trier, and Wacker Burghausen.

In December 2021 Breu was appointed as technical director in Lithuanian Football Federation, and in June 2022 as an interim manager of Lithuania national team. In 2023 R.Breu was appointed as a manager of Lithuania U-19 team.
