= CA Fola Esch =

Athletics club in Luxembourg

Cercle Athletique Fola Esch (English: Athletic Club Fola Esch) is an athletics club in Esch-sur-Alzette, in south-western Luxembourg. The club was founded in 1950. CA Fola is based at Stade Émile Mayrisch, which it shares with its sister football club, CS Fola Esch.

The club has competitors in a variety of athletic events. As of May 2025, the national record for fastest women's 400m was held by Fanny Arendt, a member of the club.
