= FC Alliance Äischdall =

Association football club in Luxembourg

- Full name: FC Alliance Äischdall Hobscheid-Eischen
- Founded: 30 March 2007; 19 years ago
- Ground: Stade Koericherberg, Hobscheid
- Capacity: 2,120
- President: Freymann Dan
- Manager: Marc Chaussy
- League: 2. Division Series 2
- 2025–26: 1. Division Series 1, 15th of 16 (relegated)
- Website: www.allianceaischdall.lu
Home colours	Away colours

FC Alliance Äischdall Hobscheid-Eischen is an association football club based in Hobscheid, in western Luxembourg. They currently compete in the 2. Division Series 2, the fourth tier of Luxembourgish football.

== History ==
The club was founded on 30 March 2007 following the amalgamation of CS Hobscheid and FC Olympique Eischen. For the 2021–22 season, they play in the Luxembourg 1. Division, the third tier of the Luxembourg football pyramid.

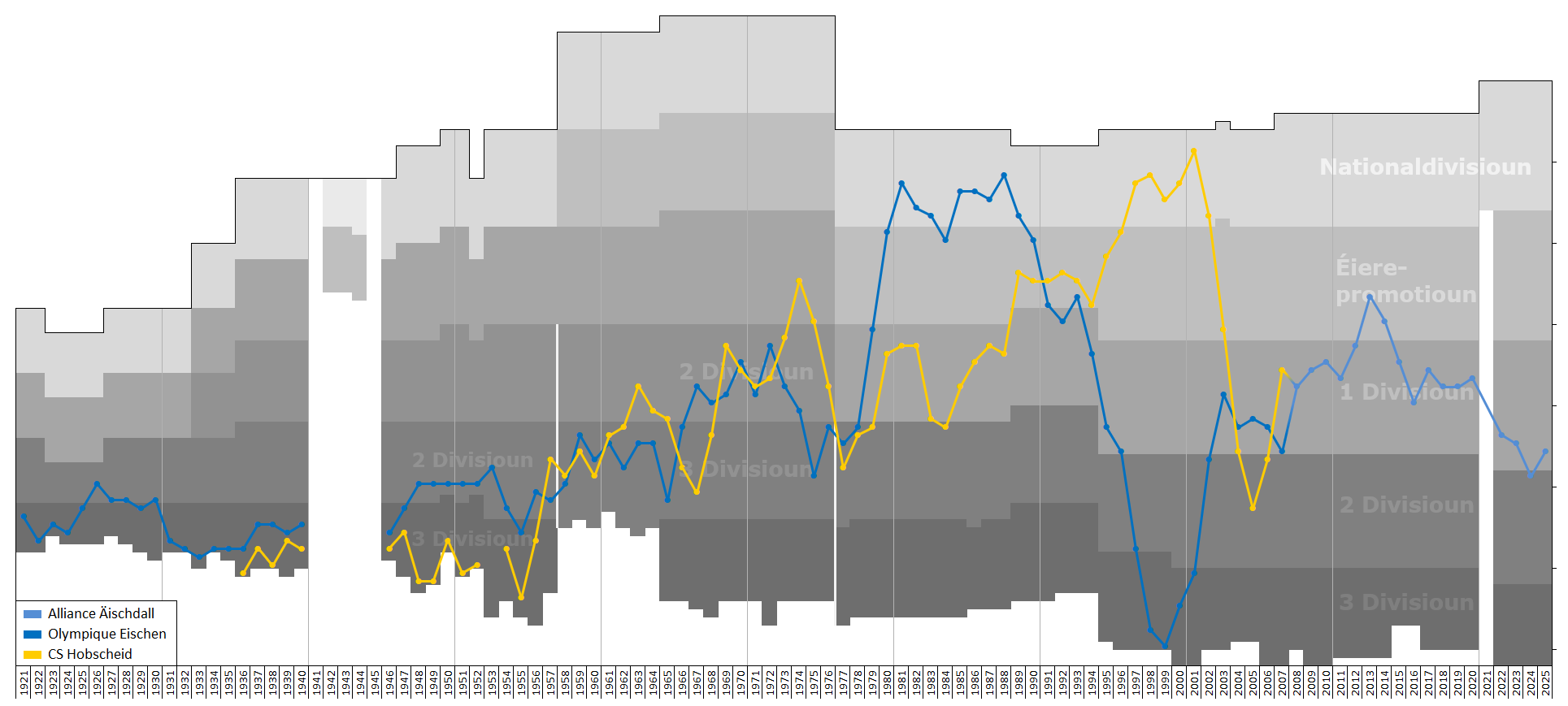
Historical league performance chart of Alliance Äischdall and its predecessors

Alliance Äischdall play their home matches at the Stade Koericherberg, the former ground of CS Hobscheid, which has a capacity of 2,120.

== Honours ==
As Olympique Eischen:

Luxembourg Cup

- Runners-up (1): 1980–81
