= FC Avenir Beggen =

Association football club in Luxembourg

Avenir Beggen
- Full name: Football Club Avenir Beggen
- Nickname: Wichtelcher (Pixies)
- Founded: 1 July 1915; 111 years ago
- Ground: Stade rue Henri Dunant, Beggen
- Capacity: 4,900
- President: Damien Raths
- Manager: Marcin Siebert
- League: Division of Honour
- 2025–26: 1. Division Series 1, 1st of 16 (promoted)
- Website: www.wichtelweb.net
Home colours	Away colours

Football Club Avenir Beggen is a football club, based in Beggen, Luxembourg. They currently compete in the Division of Honour, the second tier of Luxembourgish football.

The club were founded in 1915 as FC Daring Beggen but changed their name to FC Avenir Beggen a year later. In 1940, they were renamed SV 1915 Beggen, but in 1944, it was changed again to FC Avenir Beggen.

Avenir Beggen had played in the National Division in consecutive seasons since 1965–66, but were relegated in the 2005–06 season. Finishing second in their first season in the second-tier Division of Honour, Avenir returned to the National Division at the first time of asking. In 2008/09 the club finished 14th and were relegated back to the Luxembourg Division of Honour.

== Honours ==
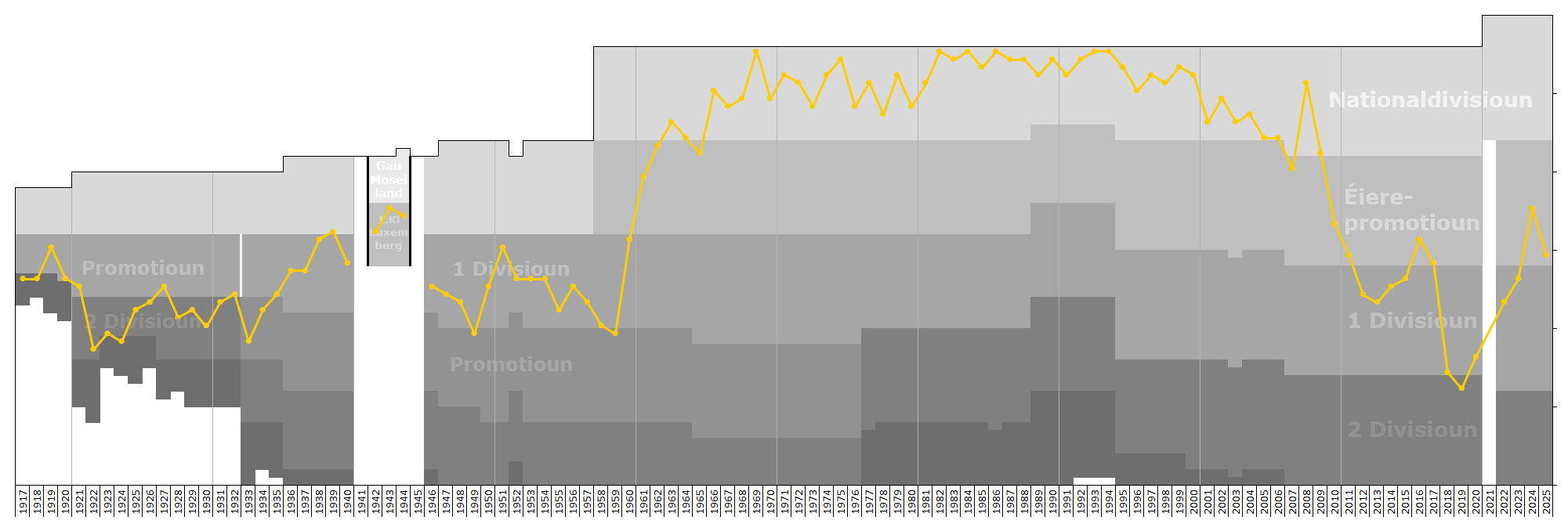
Historical league performance chart of Avenir Beggen

- National Division

Winners (6): 1968–69, 1981–82, 1983–84, 1985–86, 1992–93, 1993–94
Runners-up (5): 1974–75, 1982–83, 1986–87, 1989–90, 1991–92

- Luxembourg Cup

Winners (7): 1982–83, 1983–84, 1986–87, 1991–92, 1992–93, 1993–94, 2001–02
Runners-up (4): 1973–74, 1987–88, 1988–89, 1997–98

== European Competition ==
Avenir have qualified for UEFA European competition sixteen times.

- UEFA Champions League

Qualifying round (2): 1993–94, 1994–95
First round (4): 1969–70, 1982–83, 1984–85, 1986–87

- UEFA Cup

Qualifying round (1): 2002–03
First round (4): 1975–76, 1985–86, 1990–91, 1995–96

- UEFA Cup Winners' Cup

First round (4): 1983–84, 1987–88, 1988–89, 1992–93
Second round (1): 1974–75

They have won three ties in European competition (although two were only on technicalities):

- In 1974–75, their Cup Winners' Cup first round opponents, Enosis Paralimni of Cyprus, withdrew due to ongoing crisis in that country.
- In the same competition in 1992–93, Avenir beat the Faroe Islands' B36 Tórshavn 2–1 on aggregate in the qualifying round, before losing 5–1 on aggregate to Spartak Moscow in the first round proper.
- In the 1995–96 UEFA Cup, Avenir lost on away goals to Örebro SK, but Avenir were awarded a 3–0 victory when it transpired that the Swedes had fielded an ineligible player.

Throughout its history the team has won three rounds in Europe, including Champions League, UEFA Cup and Cup Winners' Cup. In 1969, Avenir Beggen won their first league title in Luxembourg, with a historic victory followed by 10,000 spectators, of 3-1 against Jeunesse d'Esch. Moreover, thanks to this victory, the club qualified for the Champions League for the first time where they played against AC Milan (0-5 to Milan and 0-3 in Luxembourg city).

Another success for Avenir Beggen came on the 60th anniversary of the club, 1 September 1975, when Avenir Beggen played their first UEFA Cup tie (now Europa League) against FC Porto (0-7 in Porto and 0-3 in Luxembourg city).

In addition to those three ties, Avenir has won one game in a tie that they eventually lost (2–1 at home against Inter Bratislava in the 1990–91 UEFA Cup, before losing 5–0 in Bratislava).

Overall, Avenir's record in European competition reads:

	P	W	D	L	GF	GA	GD
Avenir Beggen	36	3	3	30	12	142	-130

== Current squad ==
2023/2024 season Note: Flags indicate national team as defined under FIFA eligibility rules; some limited exceptions apply. Players may hold more than one non-FIFA nationality.

No.	Pos.	Nation	Player
4	MF	LUX	Gabriele Terenziani
5	MF	CPV	Eurico Gomes
6	MF	LUX	Marlon Rock
7	DF	LUX	Yves Rowlings da Cunha
9	MF	FRA	Yassine Maziz
10	FW	FRA	Younes Maziz
11	MF	POR	Luís Magalhães
12	GK	CPV	Carlitos Varela
13	MF	ENG	Matteo Akers
14	FW	CIV	Leonel Mao
16	FW	LUX	Nelson Furtado
19	DF	LUX	Cliff Bernard

No.	Pos.	Nation	Player
20	MF	LUX	Dylan Lima Borges
22	GK	LUX	Kevin Straus
24	MF	LUX	Denilson Santos Lopes
28	MF	LUX	Alex Pinheiro
29	FW	CPV	Jadir Lima
32	DF	FRA	Mohammed Guenoun
69	DF	UKR	Maksym Khudoliy
89	MF	FRA	Kevin Bile
99	FW	FRA	Marc Etoundi Mekongo
—	DF	POR	Maruca
—	MF	CPV	Keiven Goncalves
—	FW	LUX	Armin Sabotic

== Former coaches ==
- (Luxembourg) Marc Boreux (1966–72)
- (Luxembourg) Henri Cirelli (1973–76)
- (Luxembourg) Josy Kirchens (1976–77)
- (Austria) Willi Macho (1979–80)
- (Luxembourg) Albert Adams (1980–82)
- (Luxembourg) Jean Bettinger (1982–83)
- (Luxembourg) Paul Philipp (1983–85)
- (Luxembourg) Michel Clement (1985–88)
- (Luxembourg) Louis Pilot (1988–90)
- (Luxembourg) Albert Adams (1990–95)
- (France) Jacky Pérignon (1995–96)
- (Luxembourg) Theo Scholten (1996)
- (Luxembourg) Vinicio Monacelli (2000)
- (Luxembourg) Jeannot Reiter (2000–02)
- (Luxembourg) Gilbert Dresch (2002–03)
- (Luxembourg) Jean Fiedler (2003)
- (France) Jacky Pérignon (2003)
- (Luxembourg) Michel Clement (2003–04)
- (Albania) Florim Alijaj (2004–05)
- (Spain) Fernando Gutiérrez (2004–05)
- (Albania) Florim Alijaj (2005)
- (Spain) Fernando Gutiérrez (2005–08)
- (France) Manuel Peixoto (2008–09)
- (Luxembourg) Jos Steffen (2009–11)
- (Luxembourg) Dan Santos (2013–16)
- (Luxembourg) Gilles Wagner (2016)
- (Portugal) Paulo Gomes (2016–17)
- (Luxembourg) Carlo Feipel (2017)
- (Luxembourg) Jeannot Reiter (2017–18)
- (Luxembourg) Almir Civic (2018–unknown)
- (Poland) Marcin Siebert (2025–)
