= Jeunesse Esch =

Association football club in Luxembourg

- Full name: Association Sportive la Jeunesse d'Esch/Alzette
- Founded: August 13, 1907; 119 years ago
- Ground: Stade de la Frontière
- Capacity: 4,000
- President: Marc Theisen
- Manager: Reinhold Breu
- League: National Division
- 2025–26: National Division, 6th of 16
- Website: www.jeunesse-esch.lu
Home colours	Away colours

Association Sportive la Jeunesse d'Esch/Alzette, usually abbreviated to Jeunesse Esch, is a professional football club based in Esch-sur-Alzette, in south-western Luxembourg. The side play in the National Division, the top tier of Luxembourgish football, and have won the league title on 28 occasions between 1921 and 2010, the most of any team in Luxembourg.

== History ==
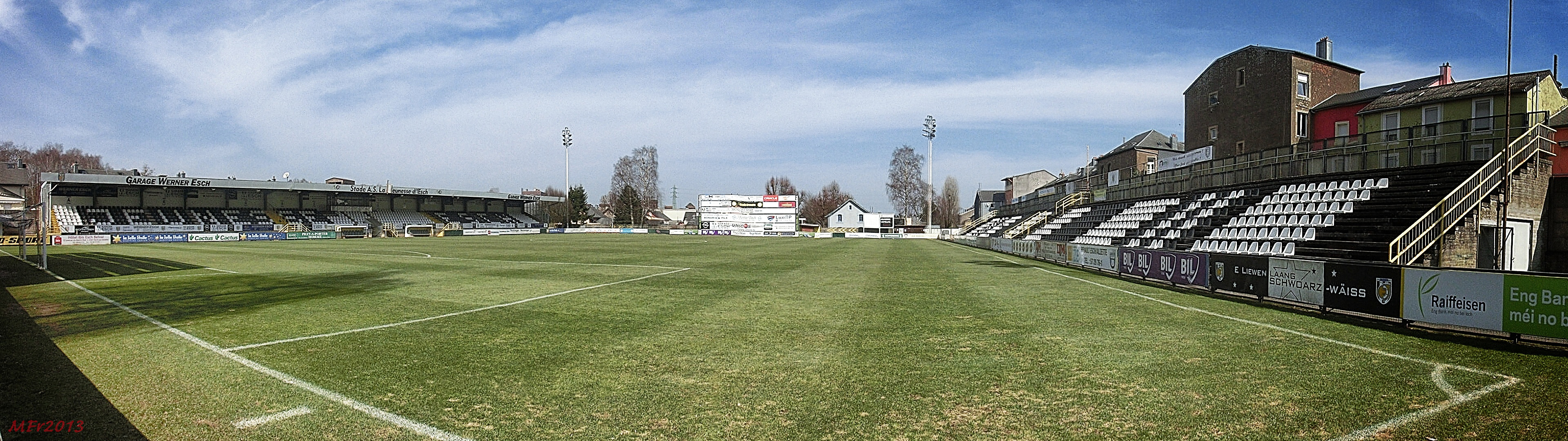
Stade de la Frontière

The club was founded in 1907 as Jeunesse la Frontière d'Esch in reference to the proximity of their stadium to the border with France. "La frontière" was dropped to give the club its current name in 1918, which it retained until World War II, where the Nazi regime implemented the German name SV Schwarz-Weiß 07 Esch and the club had to play in the Gauliga Moselland, finishing runners-up in the 1943–44 season. After the liberation of Luxembourg, the name reverted to AS la Jeunesse d'Esch.

Historically, Jeunesse Esch has been the most successful side in Luxembourgish football. They have won the National Division on 28 occasions: first in 1921, and most recently in 2010. This is a national record, unless Racing FC Union Luxembourg's many predecessor clubs are counted together (they won a total of 28, divided between six incarnations). Jeunesse has also won the Luxembourg Cup on twelve occasions, second behind the fourteen won by FA Red Boys Differdange (now a part of FC Differdange 03). In total, they have completed the coveted Double on eight occasions, tied with F91 Dudelange as having the most in Luxembourg.

They first entered the European Cup in 1958, but like most of Luxembourg's clubs, failed to pass the preliminary rounds of the competition. Their most famous result came in the early stages of the 1973 competition when they held then-UEFA Cup holders Liverpool to a 1–1 draw at home before losing the second leg 2–0 at Anfield.

Jeunesse have continued their success into recent times, being one of the top three Luxembourgish clubs, along with F91 Dudelange and FC Etzella Ettelbruck, of the past few years. However, the club had a disastrous 2006–07 season, in which the club finished ninth, and only just avoided a relegation play-offs.

== Honours ==
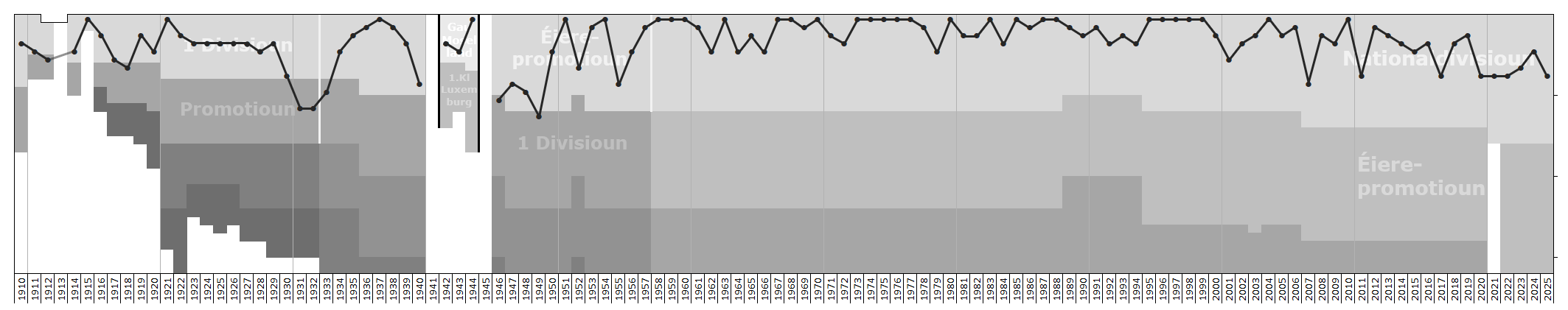
Historical league performance chart of Jeunesse Esch

- National Division
  - Winners (28): 1920–21, 1936–37, 1950–51, 1953_54, 1957–58, 1958–59, 1959–60, 1962–63, 1966–67, 1967–68, 1969–70, 1972–73, 1973–74, 1974–75, 1975–76, 1976–77, 1979–80, 1982–83, 1984–85, 1986–87, 1987–88, 1994–95, 1995–96, 1996–97, 1997–98, 1998–99, 2003–04, 2009–10
  - Runners-up (13): 1914–15, 1935–36, 1937–38, 1952–53, 1956–57, 1960–61, 1968–69, 1977–78, 1985–86, 1988–89, 1990–91, 2005–06, 2011–12
- Luxembourg Cup
  - Winners (13): 1934–35, 1936–37, 1945–46, 1953–54, 1972–73, 1973–74, 1975–76, 1980–81, 1987–88, 1996–97, 1998–99, 1999–00, 2012–13
  - Runners-up (12): 1921–22, 1926–27, 1964–65, 1965–66, 1970–71, 1974–75, 1984–85, 1990–91, 1994–95, 1995–96, 2005–06, 2011–12

== European competition ==
Jeunesse Esch has qualified for UEFA competitions 33 times.

- European Cup/UEFA Champions League

Qualifying round (5): 1997–98, 1998–99, 1999–00, 2004–05, 2010–11
First round (15): 1958–59, 1960–61, 1967–68, 1968–69, 1970–71, 1973–74, 1974–75, 1975–76, 1976–77, 1977–78, 1980–81, 1983–84, 1985–86, 1987–88, 1988–89
Second round (2): 1959–60, 1963–64

- European Cup Winners' Cup/UEFA Cup Winners' Cup

Qualifying round (2): 1981–82, 1991–92

- UEFA Cup

Qualifying round (3): 1995–96, 1996–97, 2000–01
First round (4): 1969–70, 1978–79, 1986–87, 1989–90

- UEFA Europa League

First qualifying round (3): 2012–13, 2014–15, 2016–17
Second qualifying round (2): 2013–14, 2019–20

Jeunesse Esch is the only club from Luxembourg to have reached the second round of the European Cup, and it has achieved that feat on two occasions, both under the leadership of George Berry in the early years of the competition:

- In 1959–60, Jeunesse were drawn against ŁKS Łódź, champions of Poland. In an incredible first leg, Jeunesse put five past the Poles without reply, practically guaranteeing their place in the second round regardless of the return leg (in the event, Łódź won 2–1, but only after Jeunesse had gone ahead). In the next round, Jeunesse faced somewhat harder opponents: Real Madrid, champions of Europe four times in a row. The first match, in the Santiago Bernabéu Stadium, was no contest, as Real Madrid trounced Jeunesse 7–0, with Puskás scoring a hat-trick. Despite their comfortable victory, Real Madrid took no chances in the second leg and fielded a full-strength team, including Puskás, Di Stéfano, and Gento. The array of stars did nothing to over-awe the Luxembourgers on their home patch; Jeunesse scored twice within fifteen minutes, and made a good account of themselves, but succumbed to lose 5–2, 12–2 on aggregate. Real went on to win the European Cup for a fifth straight season, beating Eintracht Frankfurt 7–3 in a memorable final.
- In the first round of the European Cup in 1963–64, Jeunesse was given a relatively easy tie against FC Haka. Although they had avoided the biggest sides in the competition, Jeunesse was facing the dominant Finnish side, and Jeunesse was thrashed 4–1 in Valkeakoski. In the return, Jeunesse mounted a comeback, but were winning by only 2–0 after 84 minutes. Suddenly, two goals in as few minutes put the Luxembourgish side through. The second round pitted Jeunesse against the Yugoslav champions, Partizan Belgrade for a place in the quarter-finals. Jeunesse won the first match 2–1, thanks to another late goal. However, the tie was turned on its head by four goals by Vladimir Kovačević, and Partizan won 6–2, and 7–4 on aggregate. The 1963–64 season turned out to be the annus mirabilis of Luxembourgish football, as the national team almost reached the semi-finals, the competition proper of the European Championship.

Overall, Jeunesse's record in European competition reads:

	P	W	D	L	GF	GA	GD
AS la Jeunesse d'Esch	71	9	8	54	56	224	−168

== Current squad ==
As of 23 September 2026

Note: Flags indicate national team as defined under FIFA eligibility rules; some limited exceptions apply. Players may hold more than one non-FIFA nationality.

No.	Pos.	Nation	Player
1	GK	FRA	Kévin Sommer
2	DF	FRA	Mickaël Borger
3	DF	LUX	Wilson Peprah
4	MF	LUX	Miloš Todorović
5	MF	GER	Noel Tanzer
6	DF	LUX	Christophe Brites
7	FW	USA	Nyger Hunter
8	MF	FRA	Thibault Maquart
9	FW	LUX	Ken Schmitz
10	FW	LUX	Andrea Deidda
11	MF	JPN	Lucien Littbarski
14	DF	LUX	Denilson Andrade
16	GK	LUX	Sergio Englaro
17	MF	LUX	Eliot Gashi
19	FW	LUX	Tim Flick

No.	Pos.	Nation	Player
21	FW	LUX	Liam Nürenberg
23	GK	LUX	Darine Baitiche
33	MF	LUX	Louis Weis
34	DF	LUX	Tiziano Mancini
38	DF	LUX	Demin Skenderovic
40	GK	LUX	Martin Janeiro
46	MF	GER	Younes Mouadden
71	MF	KOR	Namhoon Lee
75	MF	LUX	Rafael Oliveira
77	FW	LUX	Selim Turping
85	DF	LUX	Rodrigo Silvestre
90	FW	LUX	Leon Elshan
92	MF	LUX	Roni Klisurica
99	DF	LUX	Rony Moreira

=== Out on loan ===
Note: Flags indicate national team as defined under FIFA eligibility rules; some limited exceptions apply. Players may hold more than one non-FIFA nationality.

No.	Pos.	Nation	Player
-	FW	LUX	Michael Omosanya (at US Hostert until 30 June 2027)

== Managers ==
- (England) Bill Berry (1 July 1958 – 30 June 1961)
- (Belgium) Félix Déculot (1963 – 1964)
- (Luxembourg) Louis Giussot (1967 – 1968)
- (France) Gilbert Legrand (1968 – 31 October 1969)
- (Austria) Ernst Melchior (1 November 1969 – 1972)
- (Austria) Willi Macho (1972 – 1974)
- (Luxembourg) René Pascucci (1974 – 1975)
- (Luxembourg) René Pascucci (1 July 1976 – 31 December 1976)
- (Luxembourg) Jean Kremer (1980 – 1981)
- (Luxembourg) Alex Pecquer (1 July 1984 – 30 June 1986)
- (Luxembourg) Alex Pecquer (1 July 1987 – 30 June 1988)
- (Germany) Norbert Müller (1 July 1988 – 30 June 1990)
- (Luxembourg) Vinicio Monacelli (1 July 1991 – 30 June 1992)
- (Luxembourg) Alex Pecquer (1 July 1995 – 30 June 1998)
- (Luxembourg) Maurice Spitoni (1 July 1998 – 30 June 1999)
- (France) Eric Brusco (1999 – 30 August 2000)
- (Luxembourg) Théo Scholten (2002 – 2003)
- (France) Michel Leflochmoan (2003 – 2004)
- (Germany) Roger Lutz (1 July 2004 – 15 Feb 2005)
- (Luxembourg) Romeo Codello (10 December 2005 – 2006)
- (Germany) Harald Kohr (2006)
- (France) Waldemar Korycki (2006 – 1 March 2007)
- (Luxembourg) Jacques Müller (1 July 2007 – Sept 23, 2010)
- (Argentina) Fernando Gutiérrez (Sept 23, 2010 – 13 March 2011)
- (Luxembourg) Vinicio Monacelli (interim) (14 March 2011 – 17 March 2011)
- (Belgium) Sébastien Grandjean (17 March 2011 – 18 Oct 2012)
- (Belgium) Lionel Zanini (19 October 2012 – 16 April 2013)
- (Luxembourg) Dany Theis (16 April 2013 – 2015)
- (Luxembourg) Carlo Weis (2015 – 6 March 2017)
- (Luxembourg) Marc Thomé (7 March 2017 – 6 April 2019)
- (Belgium) Sébastien Grandjean (2019)
- (France) Nicolas Huysman (6 July 2019 – 30 November 2019)
- (France) Noël Tosi (2020)
- (Greece) Giorgos Petrakis (13 October 2020 – 30 June 2021)
- (Luxembourg) Jeff Strasser [2021-2022]
- (Luxembourg) Henri Bossi (June 2022 - October 2022)
- (Luxembourg) Jacques Müller (interim October–November 2022)
- (Portugal) Pedro Resende ( November 2022-30 June 2023)
- (Luxembourg) Marc Thomé ( 1 July 2023–14 November 2023)
- (France) Arnaud Bordi (interim) (14 November 2023 – 19 November 2023)
- (France) Arnaud Bordi (19 November 2023 – 30 June 2025)
- (Germany) Reinhold Breu (1 July 2025–)
