= CS Grevenmacher =

Association football club in Luxembourg

- Full name: Club Sportif Grevenmacher
- Founded: 8 January 1909; 117 years ago
- Ground: Op Flohr Stadion; Grevenmacher, Luxembourg
- Capacity: 4,062
- President: Pascal Goedert
- Manager: Martial Servais
- League: 1. Division Series 2
- 2025–26: 1. Division Series 2, 2nd of 16
- Website: www.csg.lu
Home colours	Away colours

Club Sportif Grevenmacher is a football club, based in Grevenmacher (in eastern Luxembourg) currently playing in the 1. Division Series 2, the third tier of Luxembourgish football.

== History ==
The club was founded in 1909 as 'Stade Mosellan' . The current name of the club, 'CS Grevenmacher' , was adopted in 1919.

During the Nazi occupation of the Second World War, the club was renamed 'FK Grevenmacher' , as part of Gauleiter Gustav Simon's policy of Germanisation. The club's name reverted to 'CS Grevenmacher' upon liberation in 1944.

1949–50 was the first season in which Grevenmacher played in the top league, the National Division. In 1950–51, the team reached the final of the Luxembourg Cup, but lost to SC Tétange in a replay.

In the 1990s, Grevenmacher established themselves as one of the perennial challengers for trophies. In 1993–94, CS Grevenmacher finished in second place in the National Division, qualifying for the UEFA Cup for the first time. The club's first piece of silverware came in the 1994–95 Luxembourg Cup at the fifth attempt, after beating Jeunesse Esch 3–2 in a replay, after the first match ended 1–1. Between 1991 and 1992 and 2013–14, when they managed an 8th-place finish out of 14, Grevenmacher never finished outside the top half of the table.

In the 2002–03 season, the club won the National Division championship for the first time, and thus qualified for the UEFA Champions League. In the same year, Grevenmacher won the Luxembourg Cup, completing the Double.

In the 2015–16 season, Grevenmacher finished bottom of the table and were relegated to the Division of Honour for the first time since 1984–85.

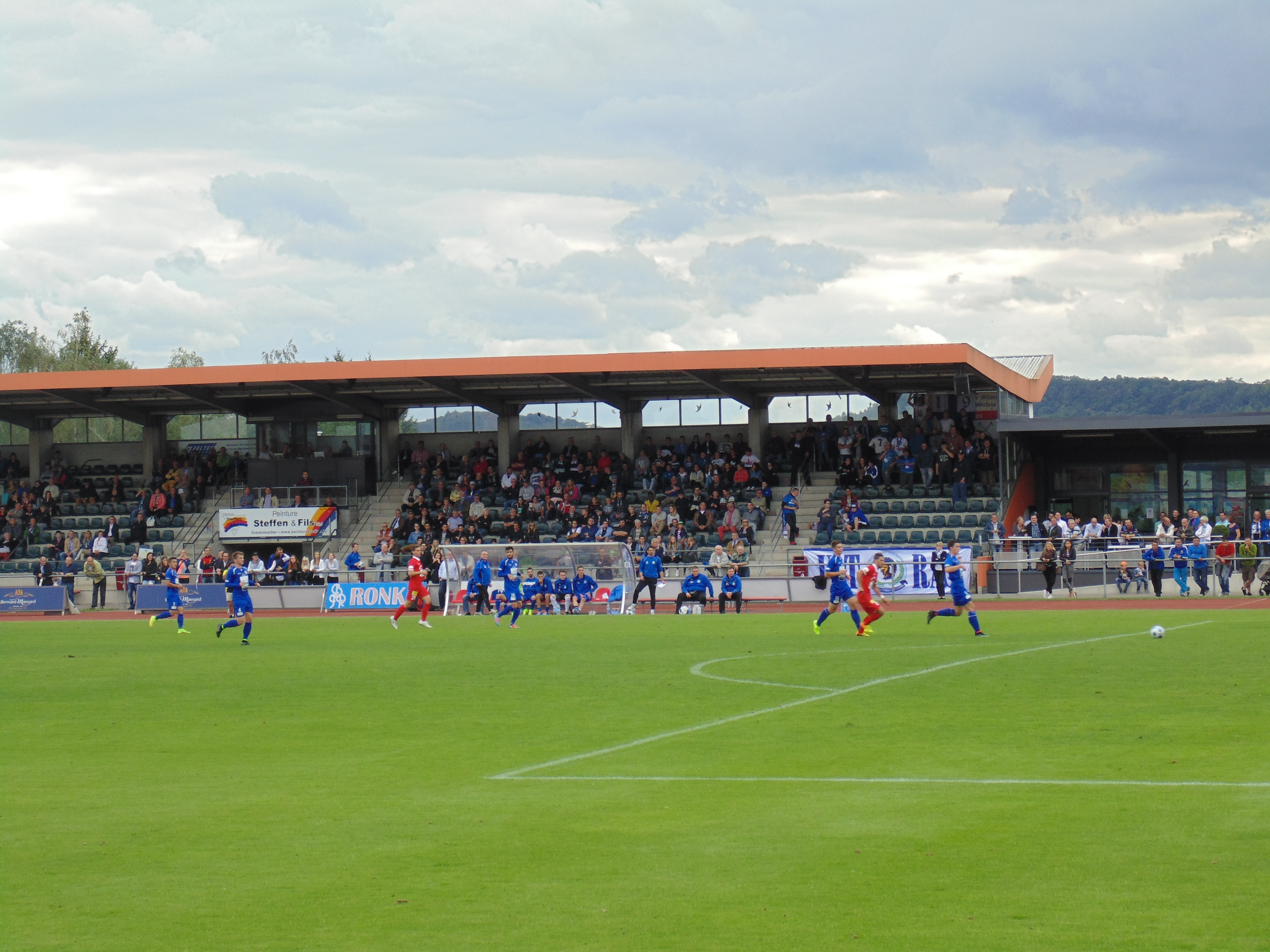
Stade Op Flohr

== Honours ==
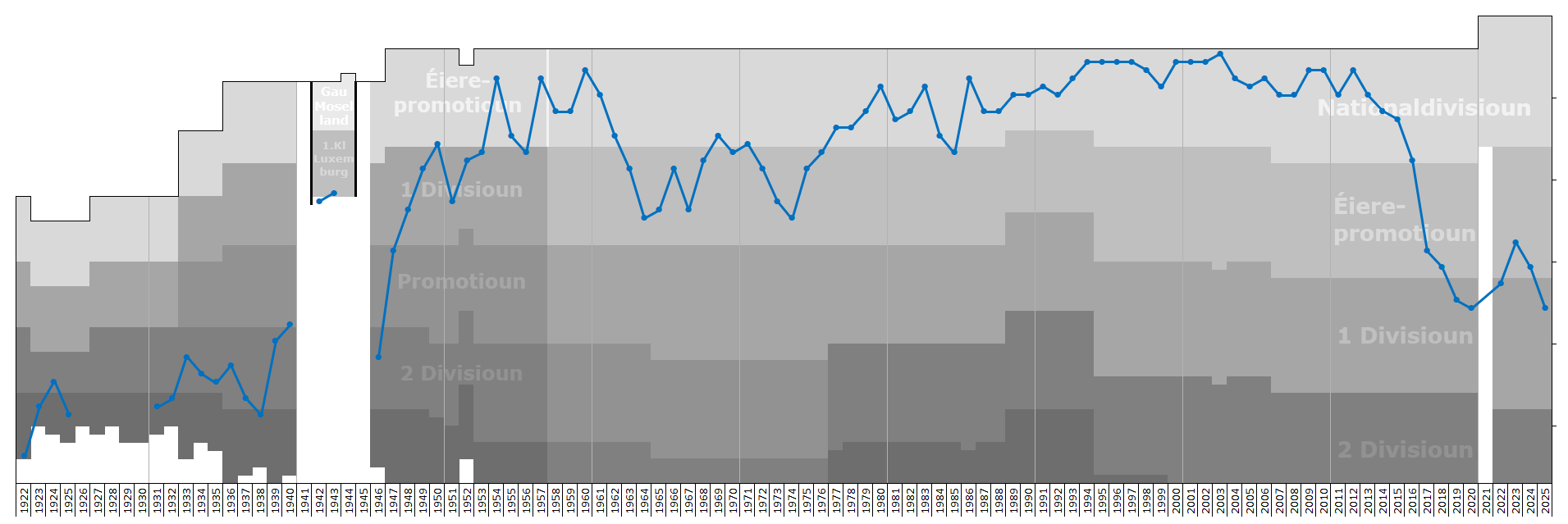
Historical league performance chart of CS Grevenmacher

- National Division
  - Winners (1): 2002–03
  - Runners-up (7): 1993–94, 1994–95, 1995–96, 1996–97, 1999–2000, 2000–01, 2001–02
- Luxembourg Cup
  - Winners (4): 1994–95, 1997-98, 2002–03, 2007–08
  - Runners-up (4): 1950–51, 1952–53, 1953–54, 1958–59

== European competition ==
CS Grevenmacher have qualified for UEFA European competition twelve times.

- UEFA Champions League

Qualifying round (1): 2003–04

- UEFA Cup Winners' Cup

Qualifying round (2): 1995–96, 1998–99

- UEFA Cup

Qualifying round (6): 1994–95, 1996–97, 1997–98, 2000–01, 2001–02, 2002–03

- UEFA Europa League

Qualifying round (3): 2009–10, 2010–11, 2012–13

The club has never won a tie in European competition. However, the club has come close on four occasions:

- In the 1995–96 Cup Winners' Cup, Grevenmacher beat KR Reykjavík 3–2 in the first (home) leg, but lost 2–0 in Iceland, going out by the narrow margin of 4–3 on aggregate.
- In the 2000–01 UEFA Cup, Grevenmacher lost their first leg against HJK Helsinki 4–1. The club had to win the second leg 3–0 to progress (on away goals). Despite a determined fight-back at home, Grevenmacher won by only 2–0, and were eliminated.
- In the 2002–03 UEFA Cup, Grevenmacher played Cyprus' Anorthosis Famagusta. Another heavy defeat away from home (3–0) saw Grevenmacher requiring a miracle in the second leg. Just as they had two years previously, the Luxembourgish team managed to win, but, again, by the insufficient margin of 2–0.
- In the 2010–11 UEFA Europa League first qualifying round, Grevenmacher played Dundalk from the Republic of Ireland. Grevenmacher drew the first leg at home 3–3, but were narrowly defeated 2–1 in the away leg, to lose 5–4 on aggregate.
- In the 2012–13 UEFA Europa League first qualifying round, Grevenmacher faced KF Tirana. A 0–0 draw in the first leg at home put the Luxembourg side in a strong position going into the second leg in Albania. However, they lost 2–0.

Grevenmacher has also drawn four games in Europe, against Dinamo Tbilisi in 1996–97 and FK Leotar in the 2003–04 Champions League. The other two draws came in Europa League home games against Dundalk in 2010–11 (3–3) and Albanian side KF Tirana in 2012–13 (0–0).

Overall, Grevenmacher's record in European competition reads, as of 8 July 2012:

	P	W	D	L	GF	GA	GD
CS Grevenmacher	22	3	4	15	18	56	−38

== Current squad ==
As of 1 March 2024

Note: Flags indicate national team as defined under FIFA eligibility rules; some limited exceptions apply. Players may hold more than one non-FIFA nationality.

No.	Pos.	Nation	Player
1	GK	LUX	Marc Pleimling
2	DF	LUX	Alex Famini
3	DF	MAD	Matis Rakotomahanina
4	DF	GER	Henrik Schömann
5	DF	LUX	Sven Becker
7	MF	LUX	Amar Rastoder
8	MF	FRA	Romain Contessa
9	DF	LUX	Pol Haas
10	MF	LUX	Bruno Miguel Martins Mina
11	FW	LUX	Marc-André Jücker
13	DF	POR	Marco Semedo
14	MF	LUX	Donat Ahmeti

No.	Pos.	Nation	Player
17	FW	LUX	Yannick Lauer
18	MF	GER	Khalid Lahyani
19	DF	FRA	René Teitgen
20	DF	LUX	Brian Branquinho
21	GK	LUX	Eric Schoeben
22	MF	GER	Daniel Kurz
23	MF	POR	Jugue Pandim
24	MF	FRA	Hamza Mourchid
25	MF	FRA	Youri Coutin
28	FW	LUX	Glenn Useldinger
30	DF	LUX	Nelson Mendonca Ribeiro (on loan from FC Victoria Rosport)
32	GK	BIH	Ivan Tiric

== Managers ==
- (Luxembourg) Marc Thomé (30 June 1994 – 30 June 1997)
- (Germany) Harald Kohr (1997–98)
- (Germany) Herbert Herres (1 July 2001 – 12 December 2004)
- (Portugal) Alvaro da Cruz (12 November 2004 – 20 March 2008)
- (Luxembourg) Claude Osweiler (1 July 2008 – 30 June 2010)
- (Luxembourg) Marc Thomé (1 July 2010–2014)
- (Luxembourg) Jacques Muller (1 July 2014–2015)
- (Luxembourg) Roland Schaak (2015– 2016)
- (Germany) Marcus Weiss (2016–2017)
- (France) Manuel Peixoto (2017–2018)
- (Luxembourg) Luc Muller (2018–2019)
- (Portugal) Alvaro da Cruz (2018–2019)
- (Germany) Erwin Bradasch (2019–2023)
- (Luxembourg) Martial Servais (2023–present)

== Women's team ==
Together with Victoria Rosport, FC Jeunesse Biwer and Union Mertert-Wasserbillig, Grevenmacher's women's team plays in a union known as Entente Osten (Eastern Union), currently competing in the Dames Ligue 1, the highest tier of women's football in Luxembourg.
