= Union Luxembourg =

Defunct association football club in Luxembourg

- Full name: Union Sportive Luxembourg
- Founded: 1925
- Dissolved: 2005
- Ground: Stade Achille Hammerel, Luxembourg City
- Capacity: 5,814
- 2004–05: National Division, 11th of 12
Home colours

Union Sportive Luxembourg, usually known as Union Luxembourg, was a football club, based in Luxembourg City, in southern Luxembourg. It is now a part of Racing FC Union Luxembourg.

== History ==
Union Luxembourg was formed in 1925 as an amalgam of US Hollerich Bonnevoie and Jeunesse Sportive Verlorenkost. Although US Hollerich had been one of the top clubs in Luxembourg, winning five titles consecutively, by 1925 its success had dried up. From the merger until the Second World War the club would win only one trophy: the championship in 1927.

In 1940, the Nazis renamed Union along with all other clubs as part of the process of Germanisation. Between 1940 and 1944, Union's name would be Verein für Rasenspiele 08 Luxemburg. The end of occupation and reversion of moniker did little to change Union's success (or lack thereof); a solitary Luxembourg Cup was all that Union had to show for the first fifteen years of freedom after the war.

However that all changed very swiftly, as Union hit its stride, beginning with another cup victory in 1959. Between 1959 and 1971, Union won two league titles and the Luxembourg Cup five times. Another barren spell followed; the 1970s and 1980s saw Union finish consistently in the top four in the league but, in seventeen years, Union Luxembourg only reached two cup finals and finished in the top two just once.

Another sudden spike of success came at the end of the 1980s. Union won three National Division titles back-to-back between 1990 and 1992 and returned to the habit of European qualification. Nonetheless, as with so many clubs in Luxembourg during the 1990s and 2000s, Union could not withstand the pressure to consolidate. Union arranged a merger with CA Spora Luxembourg and CS Alliance 01 to form its modern form, Racing FC Union Luxembourg, to take effect after the 2004–05 season. Union were relegated in 2004–05 (as was Spora), marking an unfitting end to one of Luxembourg's most successful clubs.

== Honours ==
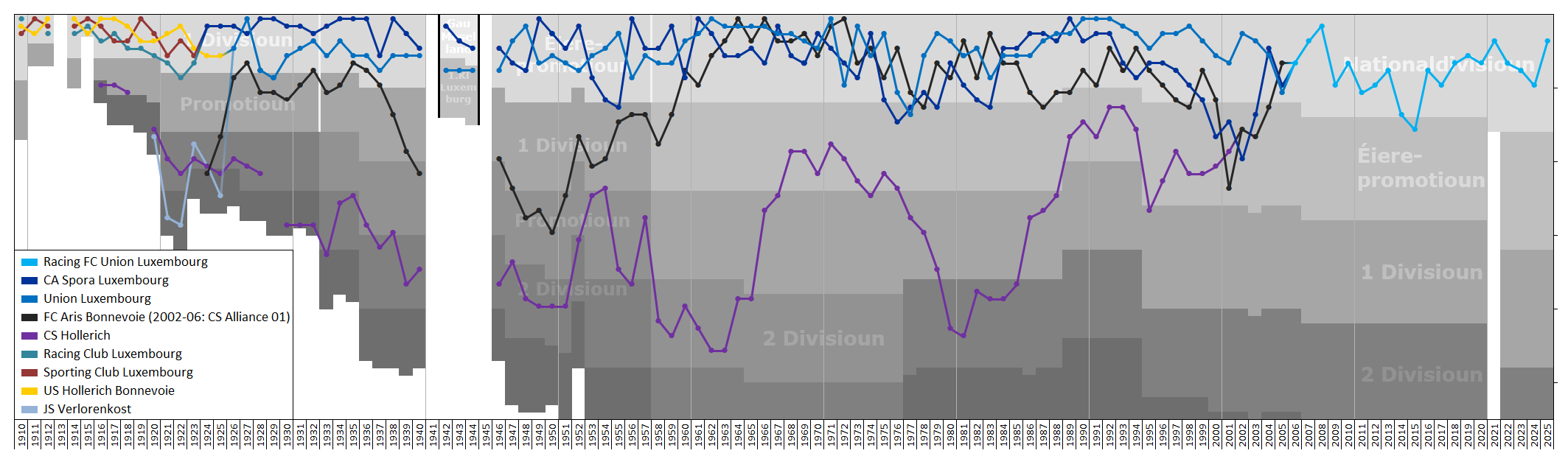
Historical league performance chart of Racing FC Union Luxembourg and its predecessors, including Union Luxembourg

- National Division
  - Winners (6): 1926–27, 1961–62, 1970–71, 1989–90, 1990–91, 1991–92
  - Runners-up (9): 1921–22, 1947–48, 1962–63, 1963–64, 1964–65, 1965–66, 1972–73, 1992–93, 1997–98
- Luxembourg Cup
  - Winners (10): 1946–47, 1958–59, 1962–63, 1963–64, 1968–69, 1969–70, 1985–86, 1988–89, 1990–91, 1995–96
  - Runners-up (10): 1922–23, 1925–26, 1932–33, 1936–37, 1960–61, 1961–62, 1966–67, 1977–78, 1982–83, 1996–97

=== As US Hollerich Bonnevoie ===
- National Division
  - Winners (5): 1911–12, 1913–14, 1914–15, 1915–16, 1916–17
  - Runners-up (2): 1909–10, 1917–18

== European competition ==
Union Luxembourg qualified for UEFA European competition 21 times.

- UEFA Champions League

Qualifying round (1): 1971–72
First round (4): 1962–63, 1990–91, 1991–92, 1992–93

- UEFA Cup Winners' Cup

Qualifying round (2): 1996–97, 1997–98
First round (8): 1963–64, 1964–65, 1969–70, 1970–71, 1978–79, 1984–85, 1986–87, 1989–90

- UEFA Cup

Qualifying round (1): 1998–99
First round (5): 1965–66, 1966–67, 1973–74, 1988–89, 1993–94

Without having won a tie, Union won two matches against European opponents. The first came in 1970–71, against Turkish side Göztepe in the Cup Winners' Cup. Göztepe had won the first leg 5–0, but Union managed a 1–0 victory in the home leg (this was very limited revenge, as Göztepe had knocked Union out the previous year as well). Their second victory was over Bodø/Glimt of Norway, by one goal to nil, having losing the first leg 4–1. Union also managed draws against Botev Plovdiv and Djurgårdens IF in 1984–85 and 1989–90 respectively.

== Managers ==
- (Hungary) Hugo Fenichel (1937–38)
- (England) Bill Berry (1961–65)
- (Belgium) René Noerdinger (1973–79)
- (France) Alex Pecqueur (1989–92)
- (Luxembourg) Roland Schnit (1992–93)
- (Germany) Heinz Maas (1993)
- (France) Alex Pecqueur (1994–95)
- (Algeria) Rachid Belhout (2001–03)
- (Luxembourg) Jeannot Reiter (2003–05)
