= FC Aris Bonnevoie =

Defunct association football club in Luxembourg

Aris Bonnevoie
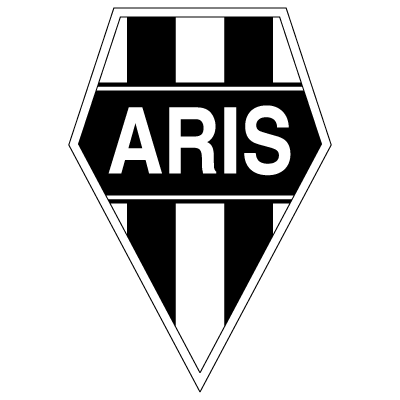
- Full name: Football Club Aris Bonnevoie
- Founded: 1922
- Dissolved: 2001
- Ground: Stade Josy Barthel, Luxembourg City
- Capacity: 8,022
- 2000–01: Division of Honour, 11th of 14
Home colours	Away colours

FC Aris Bonnevoie was a football club, based in Luxembourg City, in southern Luxembourg. It is now a part of Racing FC Union Luxembourg.

== History ==
Founded in 1922, Aris peaked in the 1960s and 1970s, when it won silverware and represented Luxembourg in European competition. In 42 seasons in the top flight, Aris accumulated over 1,100 points, ranking it eleventh amongst Luxembourgish clubs. However, Aris is perhaps most fondly remembered for its exploits in European competition, having been one of only a handful of Luxembourgish clubs to reach the second round of any European competition, where they managed to score a goal both at home and away at the Camp Nou against Barcelona in the 1979–80 Cup Winners' Cup.

Aris ceased to exist in 2001, when it merged with CS Hollerich to form CS Alliance 01. In 2005, Alliance 01 merged with two clubs from Luxembourg City, CA Spora Luxembourg and Union Luxembourg, to form Aris' modern incarnation, Racing FC Union Luxembourg.

== Honours ==
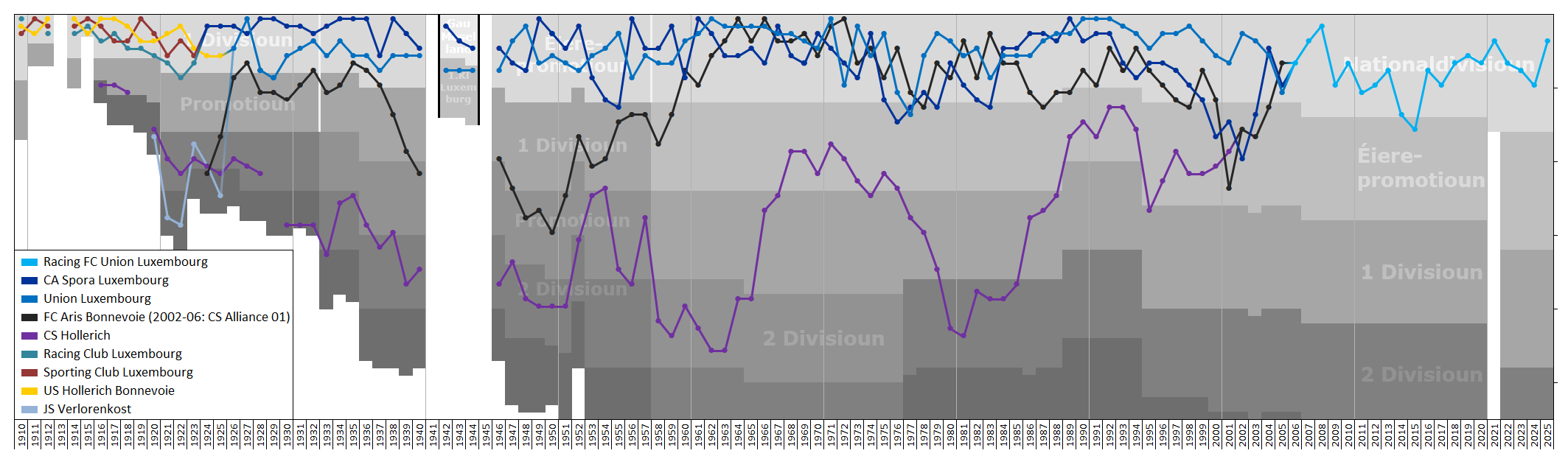
Historical league performance chart of Racing FC Union Luxembourg and its predecessors, including Aris Bonnevoie

- National Division
  - Winners (3): 1963–64, 1965–66, 1971–72
  - Runners-up (1): 1970–71
- Luxembourg Cup
  - Winners (1): 1966–67
  - Runners-up (5): 1963–64, 1967–68, 1971–72, 1975–76, 1978–79

== European Competition ==
Aris Bonnevoie qualified for UEFA European competition eleven times.

- UEFA Champions League

First round (3): 1964–65, 1966–67, 1972–73

- UEFA Cup Winners' Cup

First round (2): 1967–68, 1976–77
Second round (1): 1979–80

- UEFA Cup

First round (4): 1962–63, 1963–64, 1971–72, 1983–84

Aris won a single tie in European competition, in the Cup Winners' Cup in 1979–80. In the first round, Aris overcame Reipas Lahti of Finland, before losing to FC Barcelona. Furthermore, to Aris' credit, the team scored in both legs in the tie against Barcelona, but lost 11–2 on aggregate. In the first round of the same competition three years earlier, Aris had beaten Northern Ireland's Carrick Rangers 2–1, but went out 5–2 on aggregate. Over the years, the club also managed draws against Linfield (also of Northern Ireland), RFC Liège (of Belgium), and ADO Den Haag (of the Netherlands), but lost all three ties.

Overall, Aris' record in European competition reads:

	P	W	D	L	GF	GA	GD
FC Aris Bonnevoie	22	3	3	16	16	72	−56
