= Football in Luxembourg =

- Country: Luxembourg
- Governing body: Luxembourg Football Federation
- National teams: Men (U21, U19, U17); Women (U19, U17)

National competitions
- Men's competition: FIFA World Cup; UEFA European Championship; UEFA Nations League; Women's competition: FIFA Women's World Cup; UEFA Women's Championship; UEFA Women's Nations League

Club competitions
- Men's leagues: National Division; Division of Honour; 1. Division; 2. Division; 3. Division; Men's cups: Luxembourg Cup; Coupe FLF; Women's leagues: Ligue 1; Ligue 2; Ligue 3; Women's cups: Luxembourg Women's Cup

International competitions
- Champions League; Europa League; Europa Conference League

Football in Luxembourg is governed by the Luxembourg Football Federation (FLF), which is a member of FIFA and UEFA. The FLF organises the men's, women's and futsal national teams, in addition to the main domestic competitions, the National Division and the Luxembourg Cup. Association football is the most popular sport in Luxembourg.

Despite football being so popular in Luxembourg, the country has rarely had a club pass the second round of qualifying for the Champions League. However, in the 2018-19 Europa League, F91 Dudelange became the first team from Luxembourg to qualify to the group stage of a major European Competition when they beat CFR Cluj of Romania in the Play-Offs 5–2 on aggregate.

The first match of the national team was played on 29 October 1911 (defeat 1–4 against France), while the first women's game was a 0–4 defeat to Slovakia on 18 November 2006.

== History ==
The oldest football club in Luxembourg is Fola Esch, founded as the "Football and Lawntennis Club" on 9 December 1906 by English language teacher Jean Roeder. Being the oldest club in the country, they are also part of the Club of Pioneers, a group set up by Sheffield FC to join the oldest clubs in each country.

It wasn't until 1908 that enough clubs had been created to form the Luxembourg Football Federation (FLF). The following year, in 1909, the FLF organised the first National Division league, which was won by Racing Club Luxembourg. Racing were also the first team to win the inaugural Luxembourg Cup 12 years later. The women's league started in the 1971–73 season and was won by the Atert Bissen women's team. A women's cup competition started in 2001–02, where the Progrès Niederkorn women's team won the trophy.

Luxembourg, as a nation, was affiliated with FIFA in 1910, and then with UEFA in 1954. The first match of the national team was a 1–4 defeat at home to France on 29 October 1910. It was only in 2006 that the national women's team played their first game, a 0–4 defeat to Slovakia at home in the 2009 UEFA Euro Qualifying stage. The country hosted their first, and so far only, national tournament in 2006 when they hosted the Euro Under-17 Euro tournament, where they failed to progress beyond the group stage. Until 2017, Luxembourg were consistently ranked outside the top 100 teams by FIFA, but after some good results, namely in the UEFA Nations League, they are now ranked 84th.

The national stadium, the Stade de Luxembourg was opened in September 2021, replacing the outdated Stade Josy Barthel, first inaugurated in 1931, as the home of the country's national team.

Since the turn of the century, the domestic league has been dominated by F91 Dudelange, having won 14 league titles as well as 7 Luxembourg Cup titles. This is still some way behind the most successful team in the country, Jeunesse Esch, with 28 league titles, however Dudelange was only founded as recently as 1991. They added to this success by becoming the first Luxembourgish team to qualify for the group stage of the Europa League in 2018–19, after dropping out of the Champions League Qualification Stage.

== Rankings ==
=== FIFA Ranking ===
FIFA World Rankings as of 7 October 2026.
Rank	Change	Team	Points
99	Steady	Vietnam	1231.29
100	▲1	Tajikistan	1218.88
101	▼3	Luxembourg	1218.8
102	▼2	El Salvador	1212.4
103	▲2	Equatorial Guinea	1200.39

=== UEFA Coefficient ===
UEFA Coefficient Rankings as of 23 October 2018.
Rank	Change	Team	Points
41	▲2	Lithuania	6.75
42	▼2	Latvia	5.625
43	▲5	Luxembourg	5.25
44	▲2	Armenia	5.25
45	▲2	Malta	5.125

== League system ==
=== Men's league ===
Level	League		Promotion/Relegation
1	National Division; 16 clubs		2 to 4 clubs
2	Division of Honour; 16 clubs		2 to 4 clubs 2 to 4 clubs
3	1. Division Serie 1; 16 clubs	1. Division Serie 2; 16 clubs	2 to 4 clubs 4 to 8 clubs
4	2. Division Serie 1; 14 clubs	2. Division Serie 2; 14 clubs	4 to 8 clubs 2 to 4 clubs
5	3. Division; 8 clubs		2 to 4 clubs

=== Women's league ===
Level	League	Teams
1	Ligue 1	10 clubs
2	Ligue 2	10 clubs
3	Ligue 3	Up to 14 clubs per District (Series)

== Seasons in Luxembourg football ==
The National Division started with the 1909–10 season, which was won by Racing Club Luxembourg. The Luxembourg Cup was started twelve seasons later, with the 1921–22 edition being won by Racing Club Luxembourg. During the 1912–13 and 1940–41 to 1943–44 there were no competitive competitions held in Luxembourg.

=== Luxembourg National Division seasons ===
1900s										1909–10
1910s	1910–11	1911–12	1912–13	1913–14	1914–15	1915–16	1916–17	1917–18	1918–19	1919–20
1920s	1920–21	1921–22	1922–23	1923–24	1924–25	1925–26	1926–27	1927–28	1928–29	1929–30
1930s	1930–31	1931–32	1932–33	1933–34	1934–35	1935–36	1936–37	1937–38	1938–39	1939–40
1940s	1940–41	1941–42	1942–43	1943–44	1944–45	1945–46	1946–47	1947–48	1948–49	1949–50
1950s	1950–51	1951–52	1952–53	1953–54	1954–55	1955–56	1956–57	1957–58	1958–59	1959–60
1960s	1960–61	1961–62	1962–63	1963–64	1964–65	1965–66	1966–67	1967–68	1968–69	1969–70
1970s	1970–71	1971–72	1972–73	1973–74	1974–75	1975–76	1976–77	1977–78	1978–79	1979–80
1980s	1980–81	1981–82	1982–83	1983–84	1984–85	1985–86	1986–87	1987–88	1988–89	1989–90
1990s	1990–91	1991–92	1992–93	1993–94	1994–95	1995–96	1996–97	1997–98	1998–99	1999–00
2000s	2000–01	2001–02	2002–03	2003–04	2004–05	2005–06	2006–07	2007–08	2008–09	2009–10
2010s	2010–11	2011–12	2012–13	2013–14	2014–15	2015–16	2016–17	2017–18	2018–19	2019–20
2020s	2020–21	2021–22	2022–23	2023–24	2024–25	2025–26	2026–27			

=== Luxembourg Cup Seasons ===
1900s										
1910s										
1920s		1921–22	1922–23	1923–24	1924–25	1925–26	1926–27	1927–28	1928–29	1929–30
1930s	1930–31	1931–32	1932–33	1933–34	1934–35	1935–36	1936–37	1937–38	1938–39	1939–40
1940s	1940–41	1941–42	1942–43	1943–44	1944–45	1945–46	1946–47	1947–48	1948–49	1949–50
1950s	1950–51	1951–52	1952–53	1953–54	1954–55	1955–56	1956–57	1957–58	1958–59	1959–60
1960s	1960–61	1961–62	1962–63	1963–64	1964–65	1965–66	1966–67	1967–68	1968–69	1969–70
1970s	1970–71	1971–72	1972–73	1973–74	1974–75	1975–76	1976–77	1977–78	1978–79	1979–80
1980s	1980–81	1981–82	1982–83	1983–84	1984–85	1985–86	1986–87	1987–88	1988–89	1989–90
1990s	1990–91	1991–92	1992–93	1993–94	1994–95	1995–96	1996–97	1997–98	1998–99	1999–00
2000s	2000–01	2001–02	2002–03	2003–04	2004–05	2005–06	2006–07	2007–08	2008–09	2009–10
2010s	2010–11	2011–12	2012–13	2013–14	2014–15	2015–16	2016–17	2017–18	2018–19	2019–20
2020s	2020–21	2021–22	2022-23	2023-24	2024-25	2025-26	2026-27			

== Luxembourg clubs in European competitions ==
Luxembourg football clubs have participated in European football competitions since Spora Luxembourg first took part in the 1956–57 European Cup. In total, 27 different clubs have represented Luxembourg in European competition. Of these, 18 are still in existence while the remaining 9 were merged into a new or existing team.

In the 2018–19 UEFA Europa League, F91 Dudelange became the first Luxembourgish club to compete in the group stage of a modern European competition.

== National team ==
The national team has had limited international success and has never qualified for a European Championship or World Cup. According to the FIFA World Ranking, the national team is currently ranked 91st (May 2025).

== Attendances ==
The average attendance per top-flight football league season and the club with the highest average attendance:

Season	League average	Best club	Best club average
2014-15	442	La Jeunesse d'Esch	1,051
