= Michel Ungeheuer =

Luxembourgish footballer (1890–1969)

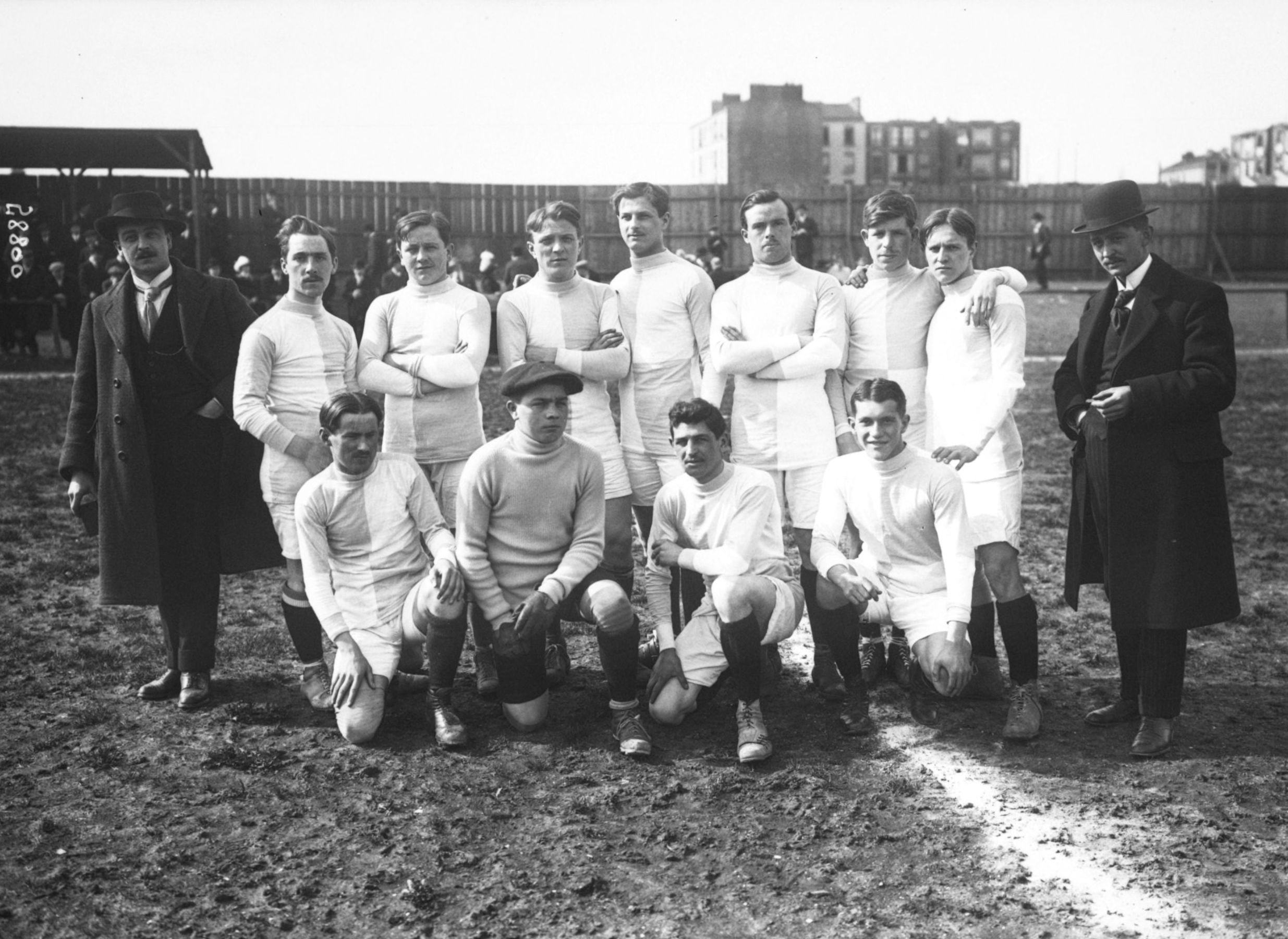
- Michel Ungeheuer, standing, second from left

Personal information
- Full name: Franz Michel Ungeheuer
- Date of birth: 16 June 1890
- Place of birth: Hollerich, Luxembourg
- Date of death: 9 February 1969 (aged 78)
- Place of death: Luxembourg City, Luxembourg

Senior career*
Years	Team	Apps	(Gls)
1911–1920	US Hollerich Bonnevoie		

International career
1911–1920	Luxembourg	3	(0)
- * Club domestic league appearances and goals

Franz Michel Ungeheuer (16 June 1890 – 9 February 1969) was a Luxembourgish footballer who spent his entire career with US Hollerich Bonnevoie. He played as a defender and also represented the Luxembourg national team.

== Club career ==
Ungeheuer spent his entire club career with US Hollerich Bonnevoie between 1911 and 1920. At the club, he won five National Division titles.

== International career ==
He made his debut for Luxembourg on 29 October 1911 during a 4–1 loss against France, and he competed in the men's tournament at the 1920 Summer Olympics.

== Career statistics ==
Appearances and goals by national team and year
National team	Year	Apps	Goals
Luxembourg	1911	1	0
Luxembourg	1913	1	0
Luxembourg	1920	1	0
Total		3	0

== Honours ==
US Hollerich Bonnevoie

- National Division: 1911–12, 1913–14, 1914–15, 1915–16, 1916–17; runner-up 1917–18
