= List of football club mergers =

This is a list of football clubs created by the merging of two or more clubs. Club mergers may be either true mergers, or amalgamations. In a true merger, club X joins club Y, transferring its members, assets, and liabilities to club Y; afterwards club X ceases to exist. In an amalgamation, club X and club Y transfer their members, assets, and liabilities to a newly formed club Z; afterwards club X and club Y both cease to exist.

== Belgian clubs ==
Clubs currently in the Belgian First Division A or the Belgian First Division B:

- Beerschot VA created by the merger of KFCO Wilrijk and Beerschot AC in 2013. Both merging clubs had been formed out of a merger as well:
  - Beerschot AC, known as Germinal Beerschot until 2011, had been formed in 1999 as a merger of Germinal Ekeren and Beerschot VAC.
  - KFCO Wilrijk had been formed in 1993 as a merger of KFC Wilrijk and Olympia Wilrijk '72.
- Eupen created by the merger of La Jeunesse d'Eupen and FC Eupen 1920 in 1945.
- Excel Mouscron created by the merger of Peruwelz and Mouscron in 2010.
- Genk created by the merger of Waterschei and Winterslag in 1988.
- Kortrijk created by the merger of Kortrijk Sport and Stade Kortrijk in 1971.
- Lierse Kempenzonen created by the merger of FC Oosterzonen and Lierse in 2018.
- Lommel created by the merger of Racing Mol-Wezel and KVSK United Overpelt-Lommel in 2010 and initially called Lommel United. KVSK United Overpelt-Lommel had itself been formed as a merger of Overpelt-Fabriek and KFC Lommel SK in 2003.
- OH Leuven created by the merger of Zwarte Duivels Oud-Heverlee, Daring Club Leuven and Stade Leuven in 2002.
- Oostende created by the merger of AS Oostende and VG Oostende in 1981.
- RWDM47 was formed out of a merger. In 2015, Standaard Wetteren and Wetteren-Kwatrecht merged into RFC Wetteren, continuing with the football licence of the latter, but selling the licence of the former to a group wanting to revive the legacy of R.W.D. Molenbeek and its successor FC Brussels which had gone into default respectively in 2002 and 2014. Strictly speaking, RWDM47 is hence the successor of Standaard Wetteren.
- Sint-Truiden created by the merger of FC Union and FC Goldstar in 1924.
- Westerlo created by the merger of Westerlo Sport and VC Westerlo in 1942.
- Zulte Waregem created by the merger of Zultse VV and Waregem in 2001.

== Brazilian clubs ==
- Club Athletico Paranaense was founded in 1924, after a union between International Foot-Ball Club and América Futebol Clube
- São Paulo FC was created by the signment club's foundation from A.A. das Palmeiras and Clube Athletico Paulistano in 1930. After, in 1935, to solve an economic problem, the São Paulo merged with CR Tietê, creating a new board and department
- Paraná Clube was founded in 1989, after a union between Colorado Esporte Clube and Esporte Clube Pinheiros. At all, 9 clubs merged (Leão, Tigre, Britânia, Ferroviário, Palestra Itália, Savóia, Água Verde, Pinheiros and Colorado).

== Bruneian clubs ==
- AKSE Bersatu was created by the merger of Persatuan AKSE and Setia Bersatu in 2012.
- IKLS-MB5 FC was created by the merger of Ikatan Kampong Lurong Sekuna FC and Mulaut Ban 5 FC in 2017.
- Najip FC merged with I-Team FC in 2015 to form Najip I-Team, then merged into BAKES FC in 2017, being called Najip-BAKES FC until 2020.

== Croatian clubs ==
- HNK Rijeka comes from the merger of CS Gloria into CS Olimpia in 1926.
- HNK Gorica comes from the merger of Polet Buševec and NK Radnik in 2009.

== Cypriot clubs ==
- AEK Larnaca FC was created by the merger of EPA Larnaca FC and Pezoporikos Larnaca FC in 1994.
- AEP Paphos FC was created by the merger of APOP Paphos FC and Evagoras Paphos in 2000.
- Ayia Napa FC was created by the merger of APEAN Ayia Napa and Enosis Neon Ayia Napa in 1990.
- Pafos FC was created by the merger of AEK Kouklia FC and AEP Paphos FC in 2014.
- Enosis Neon Parekklisia FC was created by the merger of AMEP Parekklisia and ATE PEK Parekklisias in 2006.
- Many other teams from lower divisions.

== Dutch clubs ==
- ADO Den Haag was created by the merger of FC Den Haag and Holland Sport in 1971.
- AZ was created by the merger of Alkmaar '54 and FC Zaanstreek in 1967. The name AZ stands for Alkmaar Zaanstreek.
- FC Amsterdam created by the merger in 1972 of three clubs from the city of Amsterdam: Blauw-Wit, DWS, and De Volewijckers.
- FC Den Bosch was created by the merger of BVV and Wilhelmina in 1967.
- FC Twente was created by the merger of Sportclub Enschede and Enschedese Boys in 1965.
- FC Utrecht created by the merger in 1970 of three clubs from the city of Utrecht: DOS, Elinkwijk, and Velox.
- Fortuna Sittard was created by the merger of Fortuna '54 and Sittardia in 1968.
- N.E.C. was created by the merger of SV Nijmegen and SV Eendracht in 1910. The name Nijmegen Eendracht Combinatie means "combination of Nijmegen and Eendracht".
- NAC Breda was created by the merger of ADVENDO and NOAD in 1912. Both were acronyms: NOAD stands for Nooit Opgeven, Altijd Doorzetten (English: "Never give up, always persevere") and AVENDO stands for Aangenaam Door Vermaak En Nuttig Door Ontspanning (English: Pleasant through Entertainment And Useful through Relaxation) and C for Combinatie (English: Combination). The full name of NAC Breda is the longest name for a football club in the world, with 80 characters.
- PEC Zwolle was created by the merger of Prins Hendrik and EDN (Ende Desespereert Nimmer) in 1910. The name P.E.C. stands for PH EDN Combinatie (PH EDN Combination).
- RKC Waalwijk created by the merger in 1940 of three clubs from the city of Waalwijk: HEC, WVB and Hercules. The name stands for Rooms Katholieke Combinatie (English: Roman Catholic Combination)
- Roda JC Kerkrade was created by the merger of multiple clubs from the town of Kerkrade: SV Kerkrade and SV Bleijerheide merged to become Roda Sport in 1954. That same year Rapid '54 and amateur club Juliana merged to form Rapid JC. Roda Sport then merged with Rapid JC to form Roda JC in 1956. "Kerkrade" was added to the club name in 2010 after the municipality had to bail the club out financially.
- SC Telstar was created by the merger of IJVV Stormvogels and VSV in 1963.

== English clubs ==
Clubs currently in the Premier League, the Football League or the Football Conference:

- Bury created by the merger of Bury Unitarians and Bury Wesleyans in 1885.
- Stoke City created by the merger of Stoke Ramblers and Stoke Victoria in 1878.
- Luton Town created by the merger of Luton Town Wanderers and Excelsior in 1885.
- Ipswich Town created by the merger of Ipswich A.F.C. and Ipswich Rugby Club in 1888.
- Newcastle United created by the merger of Newcastle West End and Newcastle East End in 1892.
- Watford created by the merger of West Hertfordshire and Watford St Mary's in 1898.
- Maidenhead United created as Maidenhead Town by the merger of Maidenhead and Maidenhead Norfolkian in 1919 before changing its name to Maidenhead United in 1920.
- Torquay United created by the merger of Torquay Town and Babbacombe in 1921. Torquay Town was itself created by the merger of the original Torquay United and Ellacombe in 1910.
- Rotherham United created by the merger of Rotherham County and Rotherham Town in 1925.
- Ebbsfleet United created as Gravesend & Northfleet by the merger of Gravesend United and Northfleet United in 1946 before changing its name to Ebbsfleet United in 2007.
- Dagenham & Redbridge created by the merger of Dagenham and Redbridge Forest in 1992. Redbridge Forest itself was created by the merging of three separate clubs. Ilford and Leytonstone merged in 1979 to become Leytonstone & Ilford which then merged with Walthamstow Avenue in 1988 to become Redbridge Forest.
- Rushden & Diamonds created by the merger of Rushden Town and Irthlingborough Diamonds in 1992.
- Hinckley United created by the merger of Hinckley Town and Hinckley Athletic in 1992.
- Havant & Waterlooville created by the merger of Havant Town and Waterlooville in 1998. Havant Town was itself created as Havant & Leigh Park by the merger of the original Havant Town and Leigh Park in 1969, before being renamed Havant Town in 1982.
- Hayes & Yeading United created by the merger of Hayes and Yeading in 2007.
- Solihull Moors created by the merger of Solihull Borough and Moor Green in 2007.
- Queens Park Rangers created by the merger of Christchurch Rangers and St Judes in 1886.
- Ossett United created by the merger of Ossett Town and Ossett Albion in 2018

== Filipino clubs ==
- Army FC GTI was a temporary merger of Philippine Army FC and General Trias International FC.
- Pachanga Diliman FC was created by the merger of Pachanga FC Red Phoenix and Diliman FC.

== French clubs ==
- Paris Saint-Germain Football Club originally known as Stade Saint Germain merged with Paris FC, which was later re-founded as a different club.
- FC Nantes was founded in 1943 from a merger of local clubs.

== German clubs ==
- Hamburger SV created by a succession of mergers, most notably SC Germania Hamburg, Hamburger FC and FC Falke Eppendorf in 1919.
- Karlsruher SC created by a succession of mergers, most notably KFC Phoenix and VfB Mühlburg in 1952.
- 1. FC Köln created by the merger of Kölner BC and Spielvereinigung 1907 Köln-Sülz in 1948.
- VfB Stuttgart created by the merger of Stuttgarter FV and Kronen-Club Cannstatt in 1912.

== Greek clubs ==
- Atromitos F.C. merged with Halkidona in 2005.
- Ethnikos Olympiacos Volos created by the merger of Ethnikos Volos and Olympiacos Volos in 1961.
- Panserraikos F.C. created by the merger of Iraklis and Apollon (two local clubs) in 1964.

== Indonesian clubs ==
- UMS 1905 created by the merger of Tiong Hoa Oen Tong Hwee (THOTH) and Tiong Hoa Hwee Koan (Pa Hua) in 1923.
- Persib Bandung created by the merger of Persatuan Sepak Bola Indonesia Bandung (PSIB) and National Voetball Bond (NVB) in 1933.
- Soerabajasche Voetbal Bond (SVB) merged with Soerabajasche Indonesische Voetbal Bond (SIVB) in 1959 change name to Persebaya Surabaya.
- Voetbal Bond Bandoeng en Omstreken (VBBO) merged with Persib Bandung in 1951.
- Persija Jakarta created by the merger of Voetbalbond Batavia en Omstreken (VBO) and Voetbalbond Indonesische Jacatra (VIJ) in 1951.
- Malangsche Voetbal Unie (MVU) merged with Persema Malang in 1951.
- Voetbalbond Semarang en Omstreken (VSO) merged with PSIS Semarang in 1951.
- Oost-Sumatra Voetbal Bond (OSVB) merged with PSMS Medan in 1951.
- Persikabo 1973 created by the merger of Persikabo Bogor and PS TIRA in 2019 and initially called PS TIRA-Persikabo. PS TNI had itself been formed as a merger of Persiram Raja Ampat in 2016.
- Persisam Putra Samarinda created by the merger of Persisam Samarinda and Putra Samarinda in 2003.
- Persisam Putra Samarinda merged into Bali United FC in 2014.
- Pelita Bandung Raya created by the merger of Pelita Jaya and Bandung Raya in 2014.
- Persipasi Bandung Raya created by the merger of Pelita Bandung Raya and Persipasi Bekasi in 2015.
- Persipasi Bandung Raya merged into Madura United in 2016.
- Gresik United created by the merger of Persegres Gresik and Petrokimia Putra in 2005.
- Persijatim Jakarta Timur merged into Sriwijaya in 2004.
- Babel United created by the merger of Aceh United and PS Timah Babel in 2005.
- NIAC Mitra merged into Mitra Kutai Kartanegara in 2003.
- Perseba Bangkalan merged into Borneo in 2014.
- Blitar United merged into Bandung United in 2019.
- Perseru Serui merged into Badak Lampung in 2019.
- PS Hizbul Wathan created by the merger of Persigo Gorontalo and Semeru in 2020.
- Persikad Depok merged into Sulut United in 2019.
- Villa 2000 merged into Celebest in 2016.
- Persebo Bondowoso merged into Madura in 2017.
- Persires Bali Devata created by the merger of Bali Devata and Persires Rengat in 2011.
- Persires Rengat merged into PS Lampung Sakti in 2017.
- 757 Kepri Jaya created by the merger of Bintang Jaya Asahan and YSK 757 Karimun in 2017.
- Jember United merged into AC Majapahit in 2020.
- Martapura merged into Dewa United in 2021.
- PSG Pati merged into Bekasi City in 2021.
- Bintang Junior merged into KS Inter Banten in 2022.
- Persebam Babakan Madang merged into Depok City in 2020.
- PCB Persipasi created by the merger of Patriot Chandrabhaga and Persipasi Bekasi in 2021.
- Persika 1951 created by the merger of Persekabtas Tasikmalaya and Fearless Bandung in 2022.
- Bareti 1698 merged into Karawang United in 2021.
- Mataram Utama merged into Nusantara United in 2022.
- Putra Delta Sidoarjo merged into Malut United in 2023.
- Persinab Sang Maestro created by the merger of Persinab Nabire and Sang Maestro in 2025.

== Italian clubs ==
- ACF Fiorentina created by the merger of CS Firenze and PG Libertas in 1926.
- AS Roma created by the merger of Roman FC, SS Alba-Audace and Fortitudo-Pro Roma SGS in 1927. Fellow Rome football club S.S. Lazio refused to be merged.
- Sampdoria created by the merger of Sampierdarenese and Andrea Doria in 1946, after a previous attempt in 1927.
- US Fiumana created by a merger of CS Gloria into CS Olimpia in 1926.
- Società Sportiva Ambrosiana, created by the merger of Football Club Internazionale and Unione Sportiva Milanese in 1928 by the fascist Italian government. Their name was changed to Associazione Sportiva Ambrosiana in 1929, Associazione Sportiva Ambrosiana-Inter in 1931 after fan pressure to add back Inter, and the club finally regained their name of Football Club Internazionale Milano at the end of World War II in 1945 after the fascists were defeated.

== Japanese clubs ==
- JEF United Ichihara Chiba created by the merger of Furukawa Electric and JR East F.C. in 1991.
- Yokohama Flügels merged with Yokohama Marinos in 1998 to create Yokohama F. Marinos.
- Kataller Toyama created by the merger of ALO's Hokuriku and YKK AP SC in 2007.
- Kagoshima United FC created by the 2014 merger of Volca Kagoshima and Osumi NIFS United, originally based in Kanoya.

== Kazakhstani clubs ==
- FC Lokomotiv Astana created by the merger of FC Almaty and FC Megasport in 2009.

== Luxembourgish clubs ==
- F91 Dudelange created in 1991 by merging US Dudelange, Stade Dudelange, and Alliance Dudelange
  - US Dudelange created in 1912 by merging Minerva Deich Dudelange, Jeunesse Dudelange, and SC Dudelange
  - Alliance Dudelange created in 1916 by merging Étoile Bleue Dudelange and Étoile Rouge Dudelange
- UN Käerjéng 97 created in 1997 by merging Union Sportive Bascharage and Jeunesse Hautcharage
- Differdange 03 created in 2003 by merging FA Red Boys Differdange and AS Differdange
- Racing Union created in 2005 by merging Spora Luxembourg, Union Luxembourg, and CS Alliance 01
  - Spora Luxembourg created in 1923 by merging SC Luxembourg and Racing Club Luxembourg
  - Union Luxembourg created in 1925 by merging US Hollerich Bonnevoie and JS Verlorenkost
  - CS Alliance 01 created in 2001 by merging Aris Bonnevoie and CS Hollerich
- Alliance Äischdall created in 2007 by merging CS Hobscheid and Olympique Eischen
- UT Pétange created in 2015 by merging CS Pétange and Titus Lamadelaine

== Paraguay clubs ==
- Club Sportivo Luqueño was founded on May 1, 1921, from the merger of Club Marte Atletico, Club Vencedor and Club General Elizardo Aquino.

== Portuguese clubs ==
- In 1908, Sport Lisboa (founded in 1904) merged with Grupo Sport Benfica (founded in 1906) and changed its name to Sport Lisboa e Benfica.
- União Foot-Ball Lisboa merged with Carcavelinhos Football Clube in 1942 to form Atlético Clube de Portugal.

== Romanian clubs ==
- Romcomit merged with Triumf in 1924 to form Juventus București, which later moved to Ploiești and became Petrolul Ploiești.

== Scottish clubs ==
- Aberdeen F.C. created by the merger of Aberdeen F.C., Victoria United and Orion F.C in 1903.
- Inverness Caledonian Thistle F.C. created by the merger of Caledonian F.C. and Inverness Thistle F.C. in 1994.
- Heston Rovers F.C. created by the merger of Heston Rovers F.C and Dumfries F.C. in 2008.
- Ayr United F.C. created by the merger of Ayr F.C and Ayr Parkhouse F.C in 1910.

== Serbian clubs ==
- FK Milicionar merged into FK Radnički Obrenovac in 2001.
- FK Zvezdara merged into FK Srem in 2002.
- FK Železnik merged into FK Voždovac in 2005.
- FK Železničar Vranjska Banja merged into FK Radnik Surdulica in 2008.
- FK Zlatibor Voda merged with FK Spartak Subotica into FK Spartak Zlatibor Voda in 2008.
- FK Šumadija 1903 merged with FK Radnički Kragujevac into FK Šumadija Radnički 1923 in 2009.
- FK Big Bull merged with FK Radnički Šid into FK Big Bull Radnički in 2010.
- FK Sevojno merged with FK Sloboda Užice into FK Sloboda Point Sevojno in 2010.
- FK Budućnost Valjevo merged with FK Krušik Valjevo to create FK Budućnost Krušik 2014 in 2014.
- FK Dorćol merged with FK GSP Polet to create FK GSP Polet Dorćol in 2017.
- FK Proleter Novi Sad merged into RFK Novi Sad 1921 in 2022.

== Spanish clubs ==
- Celta Vigo created by the merger of Real Vigo Sporting and Real Club Fortuna de Vigo in 1923.

- Real Vigo Sporting Club itself was created by the merger of Vigo FC and Sporting Club in 1913.

- Real Betis was created by the merger of Real Betis FC and Sevilla Balompié in 1914, just four months after Betis FC was given its title of "Real".
- Real Oviedo created by the merger of Stadium Ovetense and Real Club Deportivo Oviedo in 1926.
- Levante UD formed by the merger of Levante FC and Gimnástico FC in 1939.
- UD Las Palmas was created by the merger of CD Gran Canaria, RC Victoria, CA Las Palmas, Arenas Club Las Palmas and Marino FC

== Surinamese clubs ==
- Nacional Deva Boys created by the merger of FCS Nacional and S.V. Deva Boys in 2013.

== Welsh clubs ==
- Druids United FC created by the merger of Druids FC with Acrefair United FC in 1923.
- Cefn Druids AFC created by the merger of Druids United with Cefn Albion FC in 1992.
- UWIC Inter Cardiff FC created by the merger of Inter Cardiff FC with UWIC FC in 2000.
- The New Saints F.C. created by the merger of Total Network Solutions (Who were renamed from Llansantffraid F.C. for Sponsorship reasons), and Oswestry Town F.C. in 2003.

== Qatari clubs ==
- Al Ahli created by the merger of Al-Najah SC and Sanjah.
- Qatar SC created by the merger of Al-Nasour/Al-Sharar and Nadi Qatar which was later merged with Al-Orouba to form Al-Esteqlal in 1972.
- Al-Khor created by the merger of Al-Taawun and Al-Jeel SC in 1962 and Nadi Al-Aswad in 1964, later re-named Al-Khor SC.
- Al-Rayyan created by the merger of Al-Nasour in 1967.
- Al-Arabi created by the merger of Shabab Al-Sharq/Al-Tahreer and Al-Wahda.
- Al-Duhail created by the merger of Al-Lekhwiya and Al-Jaish SC.

== Proposed mergers ==
=== Dutch clubs ===
- Roda JC and Fortuna Sittard were going to form Sporting Limburg; but this fell through after a failure to gain financial support for the new club.

=== English clubs ===
- Bath City F.C. and Team Bath F.C. in 2009; the merger did not go ahead and Team Bath folded.
- Burnley F.C. and Colne Dynamoes in 1987; Colne owner and Burnley Fan 'Chalky' White proposed the merger if Burnley were relegated from Div 4. They survived due to the Orient game and Colne folded in 1990 after they were refused entry to the Conference.
- Bury F.C., Oldham Athletic A.F.C. and Rochdale A.F.C. in 1999 as Manchester North End.
- Chester City F.C. and Tranmere Rovers F.C. in 2002; nothing came of the talk, and Chester City folded a few years later.
- Fulham F.C. and Woolwich Arsenal in 1912; controversial owner of both clubs Henry Norris planned on merging the two clubs to create a "London Superclub". The Football Association blocked the move, but did not stop Norris serving as chairman to both clubs.
- Huddersfield Town F.C. and Leeds United A.F.C. in 1919; scrapped due to Huddersfield Town supporters purchasing shares in the club to ensure independence.
- Manchester City F.C. and Manchester United F.C. in 1964; proposed by chairman of Manchester City F.C. Frank Johnson
- Oxford United F.C. and Reading F.C. in 1983 by Robert Maxwell; scrapped after both teams' supporters objected. Team would have been named "Thames Valley Royals".
- Port Vale F.C. and Stoke City F.C. in 1926 and 2003; Stoke rejected merger proposals in 1926. Their owners made a failed attempt to buy out a Port Vale in administration 77 years later.
- Queens Park Rangers F.C. and Brentford F.C. in 1967.
- Queens Park Rangers F.C. and Fulham F.C. in 1987 as Fulham Park Rangers.
- Queens Park Rangers F.C. and Wimbledon F.C. in 2001; nothing came of the discussion and Wimbledon later relocated to become the Milton Keynes Dons F.C.
- Redditch United F.C. and Bromsgrove Rovers F.C. in 2008 and 2009; talks took place about a possible merger, but came to nothing.
- Sheffield Wednesday F.C. and Sheffield United F.C.; there has often been a debate on whether or not the two clubs should merge when one of them has come into financial difficulties.

=== German clubs ===
- TSG 1899 Hoffenheim, SV Sandhausen and FC Astoria Walldorf in 2005 as "HSW Heidelberg 06" or "FC Kurpfalz".
- 1. FC Kaan-Marienborn and Sportfreunde Siegen in 2020 as "1. FC Siegen"

=== Indonesian clubs ===
- Persib Bandung and Bandung F.C. in 2011.
- Persija Jakarta and Persitara Jakarta Utara in 2009.
- Persebaya Surabaya and Bhayangkara Surabaya United in 2016.

=== Irish clubs ===
- St Patrick's Athletic and St Francis during the 2001–2002 season, would have seen the club named either St Patrick's Athletic including St Francis or Dublin Saints.

=== Italian clubs ===
- Genoa 1893 and Sampdoria in 2001.

=== Scottish clubs ===
- Dundee F.C. and Dundee United F.C.
- Heart of Midlothian F.C. and Hibernian F.C. as Edinburgh United.

=== Welsh clubs ===
- Gap Connah's Quay F.C. and Flint Town United F.C. in 2009. Confirmed to merge for the 2009/2010 season.

== See also ==
- List of association football club rivalries in Europe
- List of association football clubs playing in the league of another country
- List of association football competitions
