= 1918–19 Luxembourg National Division =

9th season of top flight football in Luxembourg

Luxembourg National Division
- Season: 1918–19
- Champions: Sporting Club Luxembourg (3rd title)
- Matches: 30
- Goals: 106 (3.53 per match)
- Highest scoring: Young Boys Diekirch 1–7 Fola Esch

The 1918–19 Luxembourg National Division was the 9th season of top level association football in Luxembourg.

== Overview ==
It was contested by 6 teams, and Sporting Club Luxembourg won the championship.

== League standings ==
Pos	Team	Pld	W	D	L	GF	GA	GD	Pts
1	Sporting Club Luxembourg	10	7	2	1	18	12	+6	16
2	CS Fola Esch	10	6	1	3	28	14	+14	13
3	Jeunesse Esch	10	4	4	2	24	12	+12	12
4	US Hollerich Bonnevoie	10	3	3	4	18	17	+1	9
5	Racing Club Luxembourg	10	2	3	5	14	26	−12	7
6	FCM Young Boys Diekirch	10	0	3	7	4	25	−21	3

Source: rsssf.com

== Results ==
Home \ Away	FOL	HOL	JEU	RAC	SCL	YBD
Fola Esch		4–3	3–0	6–1	1–3	2–1
US Hollerich	1–3		1–3	1–1	1–1	1–0
Jeunesse Esch	0–0	1–1		3–0	2–3	7–0
Racing Club Luxembourg	3–2	1–6	3–3		1–2	1–1
SC Luxembourg	1–0	3–0	1–5	2–1		1–0
Young Boys Diekirch	1–7	0–3 (Note: Match awarded.)	0–0	0–2	1–1	

Legend: Blue = home team win; Yellow = draw; Red = away team win.
