= 1922–23 Luxembourg Cup =

2nd edition of the Luxembourg Cup

Tournament details
- Country: Luxembourg

Final positions
- Champions: Fola Esch (1st title)
- Runners-up: US Hollerich Bonnevoie

The 1922–23 Luxembourg Cup was the second edition of Luxembourg's knockout football tournament. It began with the First Round on 3 September 1922 and concluded with the Final on 22 April 1923.

Racing Club Luxembourg were the defending champions.

== First round ==
The First Round matches were played on 3 September 1922.

Team 1	Score	Team 2
The National Schifflingen	7–1	Marisca Mersch
Progrès Grund	4–0	Rapid Neudorf
Progrès Niedercorn	3–0^{1}	Young Boys Diekirch
Eclair Bettembourg	0–3^{1}	Alliance Dudelange
US Esch	4–2	Tricolore Muhlenweg
AS Luxembourg	3–1	The Belval Belvaux
Rumelange	0–3^{1}	CS Rollingergrund
Hoping Club Burange	1–14	Red Black Pfaffenthal
Jeunesse 07 Kayl	2–4	AS Differdange
CS Hollerich	1–4	Avenir Beggen

Notes

- Note 1: Match was won by forfeit.

== Second round ==
The Second Round matches were played on 1 October 1922.

Team 1	Score	Team 2
CS Rollingergrund	1–2	The National Schifflingen
US Esch	4–0	Avenir Beggen
AS Differdange	2–3	Red Black Pfaffenthal
Alliance Dudelange	1–0	Progrès Grund
AS Luxembourg	3–4	Progrès Niedercorn

== Third round ==
The Third Round matches were played on 3 December 1922.

Team 1	Score	Team 2
Racing Club Luxembourg	0–3^{2}	US Hollerich Bonnevoie
AS Luxembourg	0–14	Fola Esch
Progrès Niedercorn	4–2	SC Tétange
Sporting Club Luxembourg	3–2	Progrès Grund
CS Rollingergrund	1–7	US Esch
Stade Dudelange	3–0^{2}	The National Schifflingen
Jeunesse Esch	3–2	Red Black Pfaffenthal
Alliance Dudelange	0–3^{2}	Red Boys Differdange

Notes

- Note 2: Match was won by forfeit.

== Quarter-final ==
The quarter-final matches were played on 7 January 1923.

Team 1	Score	Team 2
Fola Esch	4–1	Red Boys Differdange
Jeunesse Esch	2–2; Replay: 3–1	US Esch
Progrès Niedercorn	1–2	US Hollerich Bonnevoie
Sporting Club Luxembourg	3–1	Stade Dudelange

== Semi-final ==
The semi-final matches were played on 15 April 1923.

Team 1	Score	Team 2
Fola Esch	1–0	Jeunesse Esch
US Hollerich Bonnevoie	1–0	Sporting Club Luxembourg

== Final ==
The Final was played on 22 April 1923.

Team 1	Score	Team 2
Fola Esch	3–0	US Hollerich Bonnevoie
