= 1921–22 Luxembourg Cup =

1st edition of the Luxembourg Cup

Tournament details
- Country: Luxembourg

Final positions
- Champions: Racing Club Luxembourg (1st title)
- Runners-up: Jeunesse Esch

The 1921–22 Luxembourg Cup was the first edition of Luxembourg's knockout football tournament. It began with the First Round on 4 September 1921 and concluded with the Final on 21 May 1922. Racing Club Luxembourg defeated Jeunesse Esch 2–0 in the Final.

== First round ==
The matches were played on 4 September 1921.

Team 1	Score	Team 2
Progrès Grund	0–2	Red Black Pfaffenthal
Progrès Niederkorn	3–0^{1}	Mansfeldia Clausen
Marisca Mersch	3–2	Gold a Ro'd Wiltz
Chiers Rodange	4–3	AS Differdange
Rapid Neudorf	3–0^{1}	Jeunesse Sportive Verlorenkost
Avenir Beggen	7–1	Jeunesse Hautcharage
AS Luxembourg	5–2	FC Young Boys Diekirch
Eclair Bettembourg	2–0	US Merl
The Belval Belvaux	3–0	CS Hollerich
US Rumelange	3–0^{1}	Jeunesse Steinfort
Alliance Dudelange	3–2	Stade Mosellan Grevenmacher
Racing Club Luxembourg	11–1	US Niederwiltz
Union Beckerich	0–3^{1}	SC Tétange

Notes

- Note 1: Match was won by forfeit.

== Second round ==
The matches were played on 2 October 1921. Stade Dudelange received a bye into the Third Round.

Team 1	Score	Team 2
Jeunesse Esch	4–2	Fola Esch
Eclair Bettembourg	2–3	US Rumelange
AS Luxembourg	0–8	US Dudelange
Racing Club Luxembourg	3–0	Red Black Pfaffenthal
Marisca Mersch	1–4	The Belval Belvaux
Tricolore Muhlenweg	0–4	Red Boys Differdinge
Rapid Neudorf	2–3	Progrès Niederkorn
Chiers Rodange	0–3^{2}	Avenir Beggen
SC Tétange	0–2	US Hollerich/Bonneweg
Sporting Club Luxembourg	3–0^{2}	Alliance Dudelange

Notes

- Note 2: Match was won by forfeit.

== Third round ==
The Third Round matches were played on 6 November 1921. US Rumelange received a bye into the Fourth Round.

Team 1	Score	Team 2
Sporting Club Luxembourg	1–6	Racing Club Luxembourg
Stade Dudelange	2–1	Red Boys Differdinge
Jeunesse Esch	6–0	The Belval Belvaux
Progrès Niederkorn	3–0^{3}	Avenir Beggen
US Hollerich/Bonneweg	2–1	US Dudelange

Notes

- Note 3: Match was won by forfeit.

== Fourth round ==
The Fourth Round was played on 5 February 1922.

Team 1	Score	Team 2
Racing Club Luxembourg	4–0	Stade Dudelange
US Hollerich/Bonneweg	2–1	Progrès Niederkorn
Jeunesse Esch	3–1	US Rumelange

== Semifinals ==
The Semifinal was played on 2 April 1922. Racing Club Luxembourg received a bye to the Final.

Team 1	Score	Team 2
Jeunesse Esch	8–1	US Hollerich/Bonneweg

== Final ==
The Final was played on 21 May 1922.

Team 1	Score	Team 2
Racing Club Luxembourg	2–0	Jeunesse Esch
