= 2026–27 Luxembourg Cup =

102nd edition of the Luxembourg Cup

Tournament details
- Country: Luxembourg
- Teams: 100

Tournament statistics
- Matches played: 66
- Goals scored: 306 (4.64 per match)
- All statistics correct as of 20 September 2026.

The 2026–27 Luxembourg Cup, also known as Loterie Nationale Coupe de Luxembourg, for sponsorship reasons, is the 102nd edition the Luxembourg Cup. The winners will qualify for the 2027–28 Conference League second qualifying round.

The competition began on 2 September 2026 and ends with the final, played at the Stade de Luxembourg, in May 2027. Differdange 03 are the defending champions.

== Preliminary round ==
The draw for the preliminary round was made on 17 August 2026, along with the draw for the first round.

Team 1	Score	Team 2
2 September 2026
Union Kayl-Tétange (4)	9–0	Noertzange HF (5)
Pratzerthal-Redange (4)	2–0	Biekerech (4)
Rambrouch (4)	1–3	Berdorf-Consdorf (4)
Orania Vianden (4)	2–3	Reisdorf (4)

== First round ==
The draw for the first round was made on 17 August 2026, along with the draw for the preliminary round.

Number of teams per tier still in competition
National League (Note: National League and Division of Honour teams will join the competition in the second round.)	Division of Honour	1. Division	2. Division	3. Division	Total
16 / 16	16 / 16	32 / 32	25 / 28	7 / 8	96 / 100

Team 1	Score	Team 2
3 September 2026
Blo Waiss Itzig (3)	0–2	Minerva Lintgen (3)
4 September 2026
Daring Echternach (3)	3–1	Bourscheid (4)
5 September 2026
AS Red Black Luxembourg (3)	5–0	Jeunesse Gilsdorf (3)
Red Boys Aspelt (4)	1–7	Jeunesse Schieren (3)
6 September 2026
Schouweiler (4)	1–4	Jeunesse Biwer (3)
Racing Troisvierges (4)	1–4	Kopstal 33 (3)
Pratzerthal-Redange (4)	2–1	Olympia Christnach-Waldbillig (3)
Yellow Boys Weiler-la-Tour (3)	0–1	Sanem (3)
Union 05 Kayl-Tétange (4)	3–3 (a.e.t.) (3–4 p)	Young Boys Diekirch (3)
Steinfort (4)	0–2	Moutfort-Medingen (3)
Tricolore Gasperich (4)	1–7	Syra Mensdorf (3)
Hosingen (3)	2–1	Munsbach (3)
Alliance Äischdall (4)	3–2	Minière Lasauvage (4)
Norden 02 (3)	0–3 forfeit (Note: After winning 6–3 after extra time, Norden 02 were disqualified after they used an extra substitute during extra time. The match was awarded to Käerch.)	Käerch (3)
Les Ardoisiers Perlé (5)	3–2	ES Clemency (4)
Brouch (5)	1–2	Boevange-Attert (4)
Reisdorf (4)	1–3	72 Erpeldange (3)
Luna Oberkorn (5)	1–3	Kiischpelt Wilwerwiltz (4)
Colmarberg (5)	0–4	Sandweiler (4)
Red Star Merl-Belair (3)	3–1	Green Boys (3)
Ehlerange (4)	1–3	Sporting Bertrange (3)
CS Oberkorn (4)	1–2	Bastendorf 47 (4)
Rupensia Lusitanos Larochette (4)	1–0	Union Mertert-Wasserbillig (3)
Racing Heiderscheid-Eschdorf (4)	1–4	Schengen (3)
Wincrange (4)	1–3	Alisontia Steinsel (3)
Les Aiglons Dalheim (4)	2–1	Blo-Wäiss Medernach (3)
Berdorf-Consdorf (4)	0–7	Grevenmacher (3)
Jeunesse Junglinster (4)	3–0 forfeit (Note: After winning 6–5 on penalties after extra time finished 3–3, Mertzig were disqualified after they used an extra substitute during extra time. The match was awarded to Junglinster.)	Sporting Mertzig (3)
Claravallis Clervaux (5)	0–2	US Esch (5)
Excelsior Grevels (5)	1–3	SC Ell (4)
Folschette (3)	4–1	Schifflange 95 (3)
Jeunesse Useldange (3)	3–2	Kehlen (3)

== Second Round ==
The draw for the second round was made on 9 September 2026.

Number of teams per tier still in competition
National League	Division of Honour	1. Division	2. Division	3. Division	Total
16 / 16	16 / 16	20 / 32	10 / 28	2 / 8	64 / 100

Team 1	Score	Team 2
18 September 2026
SC Ell (4)	1–4	Jeunesse Canach (2)
19 September 2026
US Esch (5)	0–8	UNA Strassen (1)
Boevange-Attert (4)	1–3	US Feulen (2)
20 September 2026
Daring Echternach (3)	2–1 (a.e.t.)	Swift Hesperange (1)
Käerch (3)	0–1	Luxembourg City (2)
Sporting Bertrange (3)	3–2	Marisca Mersch (2)
Sandweiler (4)	2–6	Wiltz 71 (1)
Alisontia Steinsel (3)	1–1 (a.e.t.) (1–2 p)	Hostert (1)
Young Boys Diekirch (3)	1–3	F91 Dudelange (1)
Syra Mensdorf (3)	1–9	Käerjeng '97 (1)
Schengen (3)	0–1	Etzella Ettelbruck (1)
72 Erpeldange (3)	3–4 (a.e.t.)	Lorentzweiler (2)
Kiischpelt Wilwerwiltz (4)	1–10	US Mondorf-les-Bains (1)
Red Star Merl-Belair (3)	0–4	Mamer 32 (2)
Folschette (3)	1–4	Mondercange (2)
Bastendorf 47 (4)	0–1	Jeunesse Esch (1)
Grevenmacher (3)	2–2 (a.e.t.) (4–3 p)	Résidence Walferdange (1)
Sanem (3)	1–3	Victoria Rosport (1)
Kopstal 33 (3)	0–7	Progrès Niederkorn (1)
AS Red Black Luxembourg (3)	1–3	Atert Bissen (1)
Jeunesse Schieren (3)	0–0 (a.e.t.) (3–4 p)	Rodange 91 (2)
Minerva Lintgen (3)	3–0	Fola Esch (2)
Rupensia Lusitanos Larochette (4)	1–4	URB (2)
Pratzerthal-Redange (4)	1–9	US Rumelange (1)
Jeunesse Useldange (3)	1–5	Differdange 03 (1)
Moutfort-Medingen (3)	1–4	The Belval Belvaux (2)
Jeunesse Biwer (3)	1–3	Koeppchen Wormeldange (2)
Les Ardoisiers Perlé (5)	0–7	Avenir Beggen (2)
Hosingen (3)	0–6	Racing Union (1)
Les Aiglons Dalheim (4)	0–8	Union Titus Pétange (2)
Alliance Äischdall (4)	0–7	Berdenia Berbourg (2)
Jeunesse Junglinster (4)	1–2	Bettembourg (2)

== Round of 32 ==
The draw for the second round was made on 23 September 2026.

Number of teams per tier still in competition
National League	Division of Honour	1. Division	2. Division	3. Division	Total
14 / 16	14 / 16	4 / 32	0 / 28	0 / 8	32 / 100

Team 1	Score	Team 2
7 November 2026
Progrès Niederkorn (1)	4–5	Wiltz 71 (1)
Rodange 91 (2)	3–3 (a.e.t.) (5–4 p)	Koeppchen Wormeldange (2)
8 November 2026
Mondercange (2)	3–2	F91 Dudelange (1)
US Rumelange (1)	2–3	Racing Union (1)
Daring Echternach (3)	2–2 (a.e.t.) (4–1 p)	Grevenmacher (3)
The Belval Belvaux (2)	4–4 (a.e.t.) (4–3 p)	Etzella Ettelbruck (1)
Victoria Rosport (1)	1–3	Käerjeng '97 (1)
Sporting Bertrange (3)	3–2	Hostert (1)
Mamer 32 (2)	1–3	US Mondorf-les-Bains (1)
Luxembourg City (2)	1–2	Jeunesse Canach (2)
Berdenia Berbourg (2)	3–3 (a.e.t.) (4–3 p)	Jeunesse Esch (1)
Minerva Lintgen (3)	3–0	Bettembourg (2)
Union Titus Pétange (2)	3–1	URB (2)
Avenir Beggen (2)	3–0	UNA Strassen (1)
Lorentzweiler (2)	1–4	US Feulen (2)
Atert Bissen (1)	1–3	Differdange 03 (1)

== Round of 16 ==
The draw for the Round of 16 matches will take place on 23 November.

Number of teams per tier still in competition
National League	Division of Honour	1. Division	2. Division	3. Division	Total
5 / 16	8 / 16	3 / 32	0 / 28	0 / 8	16 / 100
