= 1919–20 Luxembourg National Division =

10th season of top flight football in Luxembourg

Luxembourg National Division
- Season: 1919–20
- Champions: CS Fola Esch (2nd title)
- Matches: 30
- Goals: 135 (4.5 per match)
- Highest scoring: Stade Dudelange 8–1 Racing Club Luxembourg

The 1919–20 Luxembourg National Division was the 10th season of top level association football in Luxembourg.

== Overview ==
It was contested by 6 teams, and CS Fola Esch won the championship.

== League standings ==
Pos	Team	Pld	W	D	L	GF	GA	GD	Pts
1	CS Fola Esch	10	8	1	1	32	14	+18	17
2	Stade Dudelange	10	6	1	3	24	23	+1	13
3	Sporting Club Luxembourg	10	4	2	4	27	22	+5	10
4	US Hollerich Bonnevoie	10	4	1	5	17	18	−1	9
5	Jeunesse Esch	10	3	1	6	18	22	−4	7
6	Racing Club Luxembourg	10	2	0	8	17	36	−19	4

Source: rsssf.com

== Results ==
Home \ Away	FOL	HOL	JEU	RAC	SCL	STD
Fola Esch		5–1	2–0	5–2	3–2	3–1
US Hollerich	0–2		3–2	3–1	8–0	0–1
Jeunesse Esch	2–3	1–1		5–2	3–0 (Note: Match awarded.)	1–2
Racing Club Luxembourg	1–6	0–1	0–3		4–1	6–1
SC Luxembourg	1–1	4–0	6–1	3–0		8–0
Stade Dudelange	4–2	2–0	3–0	8–1	2–2	

Legend: Blue = home team win; Yellow = draw; Red = away team win.
