= 1914–15 Luxembourg National Division =

5th season of top flight football in Luxembourg

Luxembourg National Division
- Season: 1914–15
- Champions: Sporting Club Luxembourg (2nd title)
- Matches: 18
- Goals: 86 (4.78 per match)
- Highest scoring: Sporting Club Luxembourg 6–5 Racing Club Luxembourg

The 1914–15 Luxembourg National Division was the fifth season of top level association football in Luxembourg.

== Overview ==
It was contested by 11 teams, and Sporting Club Luxembourg won the championship.

== Group A ==
| Pos | Team | Pld | W | D | L | GF | GA | GD | Pts |
|---|---|---|---|---|---|---|---|---|---|
| 1 | US Hollerich | 4 | 3 | 1 | 0 | 13 | 10 | +3 | 7 |
| 2 | Sporting Club Luxembourg | 4 | 1 | 2 | 1 | 10 | 8 | +2 | 4 |
| 3 | Racing Club Luxembourg | 4 | 0 | 1 | 3 | 3 | 8 | −5 | 1 |

Source: RSSSF

| Team 1 | Score | Team 2 |
|---|---|---|
| Sporting Club Luxembourg | 2–1 | Racing Club Luxembourg |
| Racing Club Luxembourg | 1–3 | US Hollerich |
| US Hollerich | 5–5 | Sporting Club Luxembourg |
| Racing Club Luxembourg | 0–0 | Sporting Club Luxembourg |
| US Hollerich | 3–1 | Racing Club Luxembourg |
| Sporting Club Luxembourg | 3–2 | US Hollerich |

== Group B ==
| Pos | Team | Pld | W | D | L | GF | GA | GD | Pts |
|---|---|---|---|---|---|---|---|---|---|
| 1 | Jeunesse Esch | 2 | 1 | 1 | 0 | 5 | 4 | +1 | 3 |
| 2 | CS Fola Esch | 2 | 0 | 1 | 1 | 4 | 5 | −1 | 1 |

Source: RSSSF

| Team 1 | Score | Team 2 |
|---|---|---|
| Jeunesse Esch | 3–2 | CS Fola Esch |
| CS Fola Esch | 2–2 | Jeunesse Esch |

== Group C ==
| Pos | Team | Pld | W | D | L | GF | GA | GD | Pts |
|---|---|---|---|---|---|---|---|---|---|
| 1 | Stade Dudelange | 2 | 2 | 0 | 0 | 12 | 2 | +10 | 4 |
| 2 | US Dudelange | 2 | 0 | 0 | 2 | 2 | 12 | −10 | 0 |

Source: RSSSF

| Team 1 | Score | Team 2 |
|---|---|---|
| Stade Dudelange | 6–1 | US Dudelange |
| US Dudelange | 1–6 | Stade Dudelange |

== Group D ==
| Pos | Team | Pld | W | D | L | GF | GA | GD | Pts |
|---|---|---|---|---|---|---|---|---|---|
| 1 | CS Pétange | 2 | 2 | 0 | 0 | 6 | 4 | +2 | 4 |
| 2 | SC Differdange | 2 | 0 | 0 | 2 | 4 | 6 | −2 | 0 |

Source: RSSSF

| Team 1 | Score | Team 2 |
|---|---|---|
| CS Pétange | 3–2 | SC Differdange |
| SC Differdange | 2–3 | CS Pétange |

== Group E ==
| Pos | Team | Pld | W | D | L | GF | GA | GD | Pts |
|---|---|---|---|---|---|---|---|---|---|
| 1 | FCM Young Boys Diekirch | 2 | 2 | 0 | 0 | 10 | 0 | +10 | 4 |
| 2 | SC Echternach | 2 | 0 | 0 | 2 | 0 | 10 | −10 | 0 |

Source: RSSSF

| Team 1 | Score | Team 2 |
|---|---|---|
| FCM Young Boys Diekirch | 7–0 | SC Echternach |
| SC Echternach | 0–3 | FCM Young Boys Diekirch |

== Playoffs for the championship ==
| Team 1 | Score | Team 2 |
|---|---|---|
| Jeunesse Esch | 4–1 | Stade Dudelange |
| Jeunesse Esch | 4–0 | CS Pétange |
| Sporting Club Luxembourg | 4–2 | FCM Young Boys Diekirch |

Source: RSSSF

== Final ==
| Team 1 | Score | Team 2 |
|---|---|---|
| Sporting Club Luxembourg | 2–1 | Jeunesse Esch |

Source: RSSSF
