= 1910–11 Luxembourg National Division =

2nd season of top flight football in Luxembourg

Luxembourg National Division
- Season: 1910–11
- Champions: Sporting Club Luxembourg (1st title)
- Matches: 12
- Goals: 34 (2.83 per match)

The 1910–11 Luxembourg National Division was the second season of top level association football in Luxembourg.

== Overview ==
It was performed by 4 teams, and Sporting Club Luxembourg won the championship.

== League standings ==
Pos	Team	Pld	W	D	L	GF	GA	GD	Pts	SCL	DIF	HOL	MAN
1	SC Luxembourg	6	4	1	1	15	6	+9	9		3–1	3–1	4–0
2	SC Differdange	6	4	1	1	8	6	+2	9	2–1		1–0	2–1
3	US Hollerich	6	2	2	2	10	7	+3	6	2–2	1–1		3–0
4	Mansfeldia Clausen	6	0	0	6	1	15	−14	0	0–2	0–1	0–3	

Source: fussball-lux.lu
Legend: Blue = home team win; Yellow = draw; Red = away team win.

== Final ==
Team 1	Score	Team 2
SC Luxembourg	3–0	SC Differdange
