= 1916–17 Luxembourg National Division =

7th season of top flight football in Luxembourg

Luxembourg National Division
- Season: 1916–17
- Champions: US Hollerich (4th title)
- Matches: 30
- Goals: 132 (4.4 per match)
- Highest scoring: Sporting Club Luxembourg 4–6 Racing Club Luxembourg

The 1916–17 Luxembourg National Division was the 7th season of top level association football in Luxembourg.

== Overview ==
It was contested by 6 teams, and US Hollerich Bonnevoie won the championship.

== League standings ==
| Pos | Team | Pld | W | D | L | GF | GA | GD | Pts |
|---|---|---|---|---|---|---|---|---|---|
| 1 | US Hollerich Bonnevoie | 10 | 10 | 0 | 0 | 33 | 10 | +23 | 20 |
| 2 | CS Fola Esch | 10 | 6 | 0 | 4 | 23 | 16 | +7 | 12 |
| 3 | Racing Club Luxembourg | 10 | 3 | 2 | 5 | 20 | 23 | −3 | 8 |
| 4 | Sporting Club Luxembourg | 10 | 3 | 2 | 5 | 24 | 29 | −5 | 8 |
| 5 | FCM Young Boys Diekirch | 10 | 2 | 2 | 6 | 14 | 28 | −14 | 6 |
| 6 | Jeunesse Esch | 10 | 2 | 0 | 8 | 18 | 26 | −8 | 4 |

Source: rsssf.com

== Results ==
| Home \ Away | FOL | HOL | JEU | RAC | SCL | YBD |
|---|---|---|---|---|---|---|
| Fola Esch | | 0–3 | – (Note: Double forfait. No points awarded to both teams) | 3–2 | 4–5 | 4–0 |
| US Hollerich | 2–1 | | 6–2 | 3–1 | 3–1 | 4–1 |
| Jeunesse Esch | 1–2 | 0–1 | | 5–1 | 3–1 | 1–3 |
| Racing Club Luxembourg | 0–1 | 1–2 | 3–1 | | 2–2 | 2–0 |
| SC Luxembourg | 0–5 | 1–4 | 3–2 | 4–6 | | 7–0 |
| Young Boys Diekirch | 0–3 | 2–5 | 6–0 | 2–2 | 0–0 | |

Legend: Blue = home team win; Yellow = draw; Red = away team win.
