= Norbert Reiland =

Luxembourgish footballer (born 1944)

Personal information
- Date of birth: 20 March 1944 (age 82)
- Position: Midfielder

Senior career*
Years	Team	Apps	(Gls)
1960–1970	Fola Esch		
1973–1975	Jeunesse Esch		

International career
1964–1969	Luxembourg	3	(0)
- * Club domestic league appearances and goals

Norbert Reiland (born 20 March 1944) is a retired Luxembourgish football midfielder.
