= 1946–47 Luxembourg National Division =

33rd season of top flight football in Luxembourg

Luxembourg National Division
- Season: 1946–47
- Champions: Stade Dudelange (5th title)
- Matches: 132
- Goals: 515 (3.9 per match)
- Top goalscorer: Camille Libar, Stade Dudelange (22 goals)
- Biggest home win: Stade Dudelange 12–0 CS Pétange
- Biggest away win: Chiers Rodange 0–10 Stade Dudelange
- Highest scoring: Stade Dudelange 12–0 CS Pétange

The 1946–47 Luxembourg National Division was the 33rd season of top level association football in Luxembourg.

== Overview ==
It was performed by 12 teams, with Stade Dudelange successfully defending their title to win their fifth title in five years.

== League standings ==
Pos	Team	Pld	W	D	L	GF	GA	GD	Pts
1	Stade Dudelange (C)	22	20	0	2	83	20	+63	40
2	US Dudelange	22	13	2	7	48	36	+12	28
3	CS Fola Esch	22	11	3	8	48	50	−2	25
4	Union Luxembourg	22	11	2	9	40	38	+2	24
5	National Schifflange	22	10	3	9	52	49	+3	23
6	FA Red Boys Differdange	22	9	4	9	44	38	+6	22
7	CA Spora Luxembourg	22	8	5	9	41	43	−2	21
8	FC Progrès Niedercorn	22	7	7	8	39	47	−8	21
9	Jeunesse Esch	22	8	4	10	32	33	−1	20
10	Racing Rodange (R)	22	5	5	12	33	41	−8	15
11	Chiers Rodange (R)	22	5	3	14	29	55	−26	13
12	CS Pétange (R)	22	5	2	15	26	65	−39	12

Source: rsssf.com
(C) Champions; (R) Relegated

== Results ==
Home \ Away	CHI	USD	FOL	JEU	NAT	PÉT	PRO	RAC	RBD	SPO	STD	UNI
Chiers Rodange		2–2	2–0	0–1	3–1	2–0	0–2	1–1	1–3	1–3	0–10	2–3
US Dudelange	4–1		1–2	1–0	1–1	6–2	4–1	1–1	4–4	0–0	1–3	2–1
Fola Esch	2–1	2–1		2–3	5–2	4–1	2–1	6–3	2–1	3–3	4–5	0–1
Jeunesse Esch	1–2	0–0	2–3		2–0	1–2	3–1	2–2	2–1	4–1	2–3	0–1
National Schifflange	2–0	7–3	3–1	0–1		6–1	3–3	3–0	4–2	1–1	2–1	2–1
Pétange	3–2	0–2	2–2	1–0	3–5		0–1	1–3	1–0	0–1	0–1	0–1
Progrès Niederkorn	3–1	6–2	1–2	2–1	6–1	5–1		1–0	1–0	3–2	0–4	2–0
Racing Rodange	0–3	5–0	1–1	1–1	4–1	3–4	1–2		1–2	3–0	0–1	1–0
Red Boys Differdange	2–2	1–1	3–4	0–0	5–2	3–1	4–1	2–1		4–1	1–4	4–0
Spora Luxembourg	5–1	0–2	4–0	3–5	0–3	4–2	4–4	3–0	2–1		0–3	0–0
Stade Dudelange	6–2	2–0	2–1	4–0	3–1	12–0	1–0	2–0	0–1	3–1		7–2
Union Luxembourg	1–0	6–1	7–0	3–1	3–2	1–1	0–2	4–2	3–0	0–3	2–6	

Legend: Blue = home team win; Yellow = draw; Red = away team win.
