= 2000–01 Luxembourg Cup =

76th edition of the Luxembourg Cup

Tournament details
- Country: Luxembourg

Final positions
- Champions: FC Etzella Ettelbruck
- Runners-up: FC Wiltz 71

The 2000–01 Luxembourg Cup was the 76th season of Luxembourg's annual cup competition. It began on September 2, 2000 with Round 1 and finished on May 24, 2001.

== Round 1 ==
Fifty-two teams from Division 2 (IV) and Division 3 (V) entered in this round. Forty of them competed in matches, with the other twelve teams were awarded a bye. The games were played on September 3, 2008.

Team 1	Score	Team 2
2-6 September 2000
FC Minerva Lintgen	0–6	FC Wiltz 71
AS Differdange	1–6	FC Etzella Ettelbruck
FC Sporting Bertrange	0–11	FC Sporting Mertzig
FC Kehlen	0–5	F91 Dudelange
Blo-Weiss Itzig	0–6	FC Mondercange
Kayl	0–10	CS Hobscheid
Berdorf Consdorf	1–4	US Rumelange
Clemency	0–13	Jeunesse Esch
FC Pratzerthal/Rédange	1–10	FC Avenir Beggen
FC Rodange 91	7–0	Red Boys Aspelt
FC Flaxweiler-Beyren	0–12	Union Luxembourg
Luna Oberkorn	1–8	CS Grevenmacher
Orania Vianden	1–2	CA Spora Luxembourg
FC Titus Lamadelaine	2–5	Jeunesse Schieren
Walferdange	0–5	FC Mamer 32
Munsbach	0–18	FC Swift Hesperange
US Mondorf-les-Bains	4–3	FCM Young Boys Diekirch
Claravallis Clervaux	1–7	UN Käerjéng 97
FC Dalheim	0-6	Hollerich
Olympia Christnach/Waldbillig	1–4	FC Aris Bonnevoie
Cessange	0–10	FC Progrès Niederkorn
US Moutfort-Medingen	1–11	FC Victoria Rosport
FC Noertzange H.F.	0–11	FC Koeppchen Wormeldange
FC Excelsior Grevels	0–3	FC Schifflange 95
US BC 01 Berdorf-Consdorf	0–3	FC Hamm 37
FC Blue Boys Muhlenbach	1–0	Union Remich/Bous
AS Rupensia Lusitanos Larochette	0–4	Union Mertert-Wasserbillig
FC Jeunesse Useldange	1–2	AS Wincrange
FC Sporting Beckerich	1–2	FC Racing Troisvierges
FC Vinesca Ehnen	0–8	FC Green Boys 77 Harlange-Tarchamps
FC 47 Bastendorf	3–1	FC RM 86 Luxembourg
Union Remich/Bous	1–4	Daring-Club Echternach
Redange	0–7	CS Fola Esch
FC Attert Bissen	1–3	FC Red Boys Aspelt
US Esch-sur-Alzette	0–4	FC Jeunesse Junglinster
FC Racing Heiderscheid-Eschdorf	0–3	FC Tricolore Gasperich
FC Red Black Pfaffenthal	3–0	Rambrouch
Les Amis de la Moselle Remerschen	0–9	FC Brouch
CS Obercorn	1-2	Tétange
FC Olympique Eischen	0–3	Sporting Club Bettembourg
FC Alisontia Steinsel	2–3	FC Lorentzweiler
Iska Boys Simmern	0–4	FC Erpeldange 72
Medernach	1–4	FC Union Sportive Reisdorf
US Boevange-sur-Attert	2–3	FC Jeunesse Gilsdorf
FC Minière Lasauvage	3–2	Jeunesse Sportive Koerich
FC Sporting Steinfort	1–3	AS Hosingen
FC Berdenia Berbourg	5–3	AS Luxembourg
FC Kiischpelt Wilwerwiltz	1–7	FC Red Star Merl-Belair
FC Les Ardoisiers Perlé	0–3	US Hostert
FC Flaxweiler-Beyren Udinesina 01	1-8	CS Sanem
Hupperdange	3–1	FC Jeunesse Biwer
US Folschette	2–9	FC Jeunesse Canach
Weiswampach	3–5	Sporting Club Ell
FC Syra Mensdorf	1-5	US Feulen
FC Kopstal 33	1–2	FC Ehlerange

Bye: US Sandweiler, FC UNA Strassen, FC Yellow Boys Weiler-la-Tour, FC Egalité Weimerskirch, AS Colmarberg, FC Marisca Mersch, FC Etoile Sportive Schouweiler, CS Bourscheid.

== Round 2 ==
Team 1	Score	Team 2
7 October 2000
AS Hosingen	0–4	FC Wiltz 71
FC Racing Troisvierges	0–5	FC Etzella Ettelbruck
FC Jeunesse Junglinster	1–4	FC Sporting Mertzig
FC Berdenia Berbourg	2–4	F91 Dudelange
FC Blue Boys Muhlenbach	0–3	FC Mondercange
FC 47 Bastendorf	0–3	CS Hobscheid
US Sandweiler	0–5	US Rumelange
Red Boys Aspelt	1–4	Jeunesse Esch
'FC Brouch	1–6	FC Avenir Beggen
CS Sanem	2–0	FC Rodange 91
FC Jeunesse Canach	2–10	Union
Union Mertert-Wasserbillig	0–8	CS Grevenmacher
AS Wincrange	1–4	CA Spora Luxembourg
FC Tricolore Gasperich	0–4	Petange
FC Ehlerange	1–5	Scheieren
FC Union Sportive Reisdorf	1–5	FC Mamer 32
Sporting Club Ell	1–11	FC Swift Hesperange
FC UNA Strassen	3–0	UN Käerjéng 97
FC Yellow Boys Weiler-la-Tour	5–6	Hollerich
US Mondorf-les-Bains	0–1	FC Aris Bonnevoie
Daring-Club Echternach	1–2	FC Progrès Niederkorn
FC Minière Lasauvage	–	FC Victoria Rosport
US Feulen	–	FC Koeppchen Wormeldange
FC Green Boys 77 Harlange-Tarchamps	2–5	FC Schifflange 95
Tétange	1–5	FC Hamm 37
FC Egalité Weimerskirch	0–3	CS Fola Esch
FC Jeunesse Gilsdorf	3–0	FC Red Black Pfaffenthal
FC Erpeldange 72	3–0	Sporting Club Bettembourg
FC Etoile Sportive Schouweiler	3–2	FC Lorentzweiler
CS Bourscheid	0–4	FC Red Star Merl-Belair
Hupperdange	3–4	US Hostert
AS Colmarberg	4–0	FC Marisca Mersch

== Round 3 ==
Team 1	Score	Team 2
22 February 2001
FC Koeppchen Wormeldange	2–2 (aet, p. 5–4)	FC Mondercange
FC Red Star Merl-Belair	1–5	FC Aris Bonnevoie
CS Sanem	1–1 (aet, p. 5–6)	AS Colmarberg
23 February 2001
FC UNA Strassen	1–0	FC Mamer 32
24 February 2001
FC Etoile Sportive Schouweiler	0–7	FC Sporting Mertzig
FC Progrès Niederkorn	1–2	F91 Dudelange
CS Grevenmacher	0–1	Jeunesse Esch
CS Hobscheid	3–2	Union
FC Swift Hesperange	3–2	CA Spora Luxembourg
CS Fola Esch	2–0	Petange
US Hostert	0–2	Jeunesse Schieren
FC Jeunesse Gilsdorf	0–1	Hollerich
FC Erpeldange 72	0–4	FC Schifflange 95
11 April 2001
FC Victoria Rosport	0–2	FC Wiltz 71
FC Hamm 37	1–2	FC Etzella Ettelbruck
US Rumelange	5–1	FC Avenir Beggen

== Round 4 ==
Team 1	Score	Team 2
22 April 2001
Jeunesse Schieren	0–2	FC Wiltz 71
FC Aris Bonnevoie	1–4	FC Etzella Ettelbruck
AS Colmarberg	1–3	US Rumelange
CS Fola Esch	0–1	Jeunesse Esch
CS Hobscheid	3–0	Hollerich
FC Swift Hesperange	6–1	FC Schifflange 95
F91 Dudelange	4–0	FC UNA Strassen
FC Sporting Mertzig	2–0	FC Koeppchen Wormeldange

== Quarter finals ==
Team 1	Score	Team 2
9 May 2001
F91 Dudelange	0–1	FC Etzella Ettelbruck
FC Wiltz 71	1–0 (aet)	FC Sporting Mertzig
Jeunesse Esch	0–3	CS Hobscheid
US Rumelange	0–1	FC Swift Hesperange

== Semi finals ==
Team 1	Score	Team 2
16 May 2001
FC Wiltz 71	2–1	CS Hobscheid
FC Etzella Ettelbruck	3–2	FC Swift Hesperange

== Final ==
24 May 2001

FC Etzella Ettelbruck	5–3	FC Wiltz 71
Grettnich 24', 61', 80'; Mischo 63'; Holtz 82'		Fevry 45'; Omerasovic 70' (pen.), 72' (pen.)

Stade Josy Barthel, Luxembourg City
Attendance: 1,136
Referee: Franco Maraglino
