= 2006–07 Luxembourg Cup =

82nd edition of the Luxembourg Cup

Tournament details
- Country: Luxembourg

Final positions
- Champions: F91 Dudelange
- Runners-up: UN Käerjéng 97

The 2006–07 Luxembourg Cup was the 82nd season of Luxembourg's annual cup competition. It began on 30 August 2006 with Round 1 and ended on 26 May 2007 with the Final held at a neutral venue. The winners of the competition will qualify for the first qualifying round of the 2007–08 UEFA Cup. F91 Dudelange are the defending champions.

== Round 1 ==
The games were played on 30 August 2006.

Team 1	Score	Team 2
Les Amis de la Moselle Remerschen	2–3	US Rambrouch
Résidence Walferdange	2–1	FC Brouch
Iska Boys Simmern	6–5	ES Clemency
AS Luxembourg	0–3	Pratzerthal/Redange
Egalité Weimerskirch	2–3 (a.e.t.)	Syra Mensdorf
Jeunesse Sportive Koerich	0–3	US Boevange/Attert
Claravallis Clervaux	3–0	Kischpelt Wilwerwiltz
FC Ehlerange	4–0	Sporting Beckerich
SC Ell	1–2	ES Schouweiler
Red Boys Aspelt	2–5	Tricolore Gasperich
The Belval Belvaux	1–0	FC Noertzange HF
Sporting Bertrange	0–2	Orania Vianden
Luna Oberkorn	1–5	Alisontia Steinsel
US Folschette	1–2	Red Black Pfaffenthal
Excelsior Grevels	4–2	US Bous
US Feulen	4–1	Les Ardoisiers Perlé
CS Bourscheid	6–1	Jeunesse Useldange
FC Munsbach	3–0	CS Sanem
FF Norden 02	2–0	Minière Lasauvage
Berdenia Berbourg	6–0	FC Kopstal 33
Flaxweiler	4–0	Blo-Weiss Medernach
Titus Lamadelaine	6–3	Red Star Merl/Belair

== Round 2 ==
The games were played on 17 September 2006.

Team 1	Score	Team 2
Titus Lamadelaine	1–0	Orania Vianden
FC Ehlerange	0–2 (a.e.t.)	Berdenia Berbourg
Olympia Christnach/Waldbillig	w/o	Iska Boys Simmern
Résidence Walferdange	1–0	US Boevange/Attert
US Feulen	2–4 (a.e.t.)	Racing Troisvierges
Rupensia Lusitanos Larochette	1–1 (a.e.t.); 4−6 (pen)	Alisontia Steinsel
Tricolore Gasperich	0–3	FC Flaxweiler/Beyren
US Reisdorf	1–3 (a.e.t.)	The Belval Belvaux
Jeunesse Biwer	2–0	Jeunesse Gilsdorf
US Moutfort/Medingen	2–1	Claravallis Clervaux
US Rambrouch	2–0	Syra Mensdorf
Les Aiglons Dalheim	1–4	FC Munsbach
Excelsior Grevels	0–7	FF Norden 02
Red Black Pfaffenthal	2–5	FC Pratzerthal/Redange
ES Schouweiler	3–0	Racing Heiderscheid/Eschdorf
CS Bourscheid	6–3	Vinesca Ehnen

== Round 3 ==
The games were played on 29 October 2006.

Team 1	Score	Team 2
US Esch	1–1 (a.e.t.); 4−3 (pen)	US Sandweiler
GB Harlange/Tarchamps	4–3	Olympique Eischen
AS Hosingen	0–3	US Berdorf/Consdorf
Young Boys Diekirch	5–1	Blue-Boys Muhlenbach
FC Pratzerthal/Redange	1–5	Blo-Weiss Itzig
Yellow Boys Weiler	5–2	Iska Boys Simmern
FC Flaxweiler/Beyren	2–3	CS Bourscheid
CS Hobscheid	0–2 (a.e.t.)	Union 05 Kayl/Tétange
FF Norden 02	1–1 (a.e.t.); 5−6 (pen)	AS Colmar-Berg
Berdenia Berbourg	7–0	US Moutfort/Medingen
Minerva Lintgen	2–0	Jeunesse Junglinster
US Mondorf-les-Bains	5–0	FC 47 Bastendorf
Atert Bissen	1–4	UNA Strassen
SC Bettembourg	2–1	AS Wincrange
Daring Echternach	1–3	FC Kehlen
Titus Lamadelaine	0–2	The Belval Belvaux
Racing Troisvierges	5–4 (a.e.t.)	Marisca Mersch
FC Munsbach	4–1 (a.e.t.)	AS Remich
FC Rodange 91	3–0	Alisontia Steinsel
Résidence Walferdange	0–8	FC Schifflange 95
ES Schouweiler	1–3	Jeunesse Biwer
FC Lorentzweiler	4–0	US Rambrouch

== Round 4 ==
The games were played between 8 and 12 December 2006.

Team 1	Score	Team 2
Berdenia Berbourg	1–2	Fola Esch
US Esch	0–2 (a.e.t.)	UNA Strassen
Yellow Boys Weiler	2–4	US Berdorf/Consdorf
RM Hamm Benfica	1–0	Mertert-Wasserbillig
US Hostert	3–1	CS Bourscheid
Racing Troisvierges	2–1	Blo-Weiss Itzig
GB Harlange/Tarchamps	0–1	FC Erpeldange 72
Union 05 Kayl/Tétange	1–2	Avenir Beggen
Minerva Lintgen	3–0	SC Steinfort
FC Cebra 01	5–1	FC Schifflange 95
Sporting Mertzig	2–2 (a.e.t.); 5−6 (pen)	Jeunesse Canach
AS Colmar-Berg	1–3	US Rumelange
Jeunesse Schieren	7–2 (a.e.t.)	The Belval Belvaux
Young Boys Diekirch	2–1	US Mondorf-les-Bains
FC Rodange 91	1–2	Jeunesse Biwer
Koeppchen Wormeldange	7–1	FC Kehlen
CS Oberkorn	4–1	FC Lorentzweiler
SC Bettembourg	4–1	FC Munsbach

== Round 5 ==
The games were played on 25 February and on 7 and 14 March 2007.

Team 1	Score	Team 2
Avenir Beggen	2–2 (a.e.t.); 4−2 (pen)	FC Mamer 32
Jeunesse Canach	0–3	Victoria Rosport
RM Hamm Benfica	0–1	CS Pétange
CS Oberkorn	0–0 (a.e.t.); 3−2 (pen)	Jeunesse Esch
Minerva Lintgen	3–4	FC Differdange 03
UNA Strassen	0–5	F91 Dudelange
US Hostert	1–2	FC Wiltz 71
FC Cebra 01	1–5	Mondercange
US Rumelange	0–0 (a.e.t.); 1−3 (pen)	Racing FC
Fola Esch	1–2	Progrès Niedercorn
US Berdorf/Consdorf	0–8	CS Grevenmacher
SC Bettembourg	1–2	Etzella Ettelbruck
FC Erpeldange 72	1–3	Swift Hesperange
Jeunesse Biwer	3–0	Racing Troisvierges
Koeppchen Wormeldange	2–1	Young Boys Diekirch
Jeunesse Schieren	0–2	UN Käerjéng 97

== Round 6 ==
The games were played on 6 and 7 April 2007.

Team 1	Score	Team 2
Koeppchen Wormeldange	0–3	UN Käerjéng 97
CS Pétange	2–0	Victoria Rosport
Racing FC	0–1	Swift Hesperange
FC Differdange 03	1–3	CS Grevenmacher
Jeunesse Biwer	1–0	CS Oberkorn
Avenir Beggen	3–2 (a.e.t.)	Progrès Niedercorn
Mondercange	2–3	Etzella Ettelbruck
F91 Dudelange	5–3	FC Wiltz 71

== Quarter-finals ==
The games were played on 1 and 2 May 2007.

Team 1	Score	Team 2
Jeunesse Biwer	0–0 (a.e.t.); 3−5 (pen)	UN Käerjéng 97
CS Grevenmacher	3–1 (a.e.t.)	Avenir Beggen
F91 Dudelange	2–0	Etzella Ettelbruck
Swift Hesperange	2–2 (a.e.t.); 4−2 (pen)	CS Pétange

== Semi-finals ==
The games were played on 16 and 17 May 2007.

Team 1	Score	Team 2
F91 Dudelange	2–1	CS Grevenmacher
UN Käerjéng 97	1–0	Swift Hesperange

== Final ==
26 May 2007
17:00 CEST

F91 Dudelange	2–1	UN Käerjéng 97
Di Gregorio 33'; Gruszczynski 41'		Pace 80'

Stade Josy Barthel, Luxembourg City
Attendance: 2,475
Referee: Tun Mestre
