= 1917–18 Luxembourg National Division =

8th season of top flight football in Luxembourg

Luxembourg National Division
- Season: 1917–18
- Champions: CS Fola Esch (1st title)
- Matches: 30
- Goals: 136 (4.53 per match)
- Highest scoring: Young Boys Diekirch 13–0 CS Pétange

The 1917–18 Luxembourg National Division was the 8th season of top level association football in Luxembourg.

== Overview ==
It was contested by 6 teams, and CS Fola Esch won the championship.

== League standings ==
Pos	Team	Pld	W	D	L	GF	GA	GD	Pts
1	CS Fola Esch	10	7	2	1	28	11	+17	16
2	US Hollerich Bonnevoie	10	6	1	3	34	22	+12	13
3	Sporting Club Luxembourg	10	4	2	4	19	17	+2	10
4	FCM Young Boys Diekirch	10	4	1	5	25	18	+7	9
5	Racing Club Luxembourg	10	4	1	5	20	21	−1	9
6	CS Pétange	10	1	1	8	10	47	−37	3

Source: rsssf.com

== Results ==
Home \ Away	FOL	HOL	PÉT	RAC	SCL	YBD
Fola Esch		4–2	5–0	5–1	4–1	0–0
US Hollerich	4–1		7–1	2–2	2–6	4–3
Pétange	0–3 (Note: Match awarded.)	2–4		1–3	2–2	2–0
Racing Club Luxembourg	1–3	2–1	7–2		0–1	3–1
SC Luxembourg	1–1	1–4	3–0	2–0		2–3
Young Boys Diekirch	1–2	0–4	13–0	3–1	1–0	

Legend: Blue = home team win; Yellow = draw; Red = away team win.
