= 1920–21 Luxembourg National Division =

Luxembourg National Division
- Season: 1920–21
- Champions: Jeunesse Esch (1st title)
- Matches: 56
- Goals: 250 (4.46 per match)
- Highest scoring: US Rumelange 2–12 Sporting Club Luxembourg

The 1920–21 Luxembourg National Division was the 11th season of top level association football in Luxembourg. The season was contested by eight teams, with Jeunesse Esch winning the championship. This was the first championship for Jeunesse Esch who are the most successful team in the division's history.

== League standings ==
Pos	Team	Pld	W	D	L	GF	GA	GD	Pts
1	Jeunesse Esch	14	8	4	2	38	21	+17	20
2	CS Fola Esch	14	9	1	4	47	15	+32	19
3	Union Luxembourg	14	8	2	4	26	16	+10	18
4	Stade Dudelange	14	8	1	5	28	24	+4	17
5	FA Red Boys Differdange	14	6	2	6	42	31	+11	14
6	Sporting Club Luxembourg	14	6	2	6	35	29	+6	14
7	Racing Club Luxembourg	14	4	2	8	23	28	−5	10
8	US Rumelange	14	0	0	14	11	86	−75	0

Source: rsssf.com

== Results ==
Home \ Away	FOL	JEU	RAC	RBD	RUM	SCL	STD	UNI
Fola Esch		2–3	3–1	4–0	13–0	3–1	0–1	1–2
Jeunesse Esch	3–0		0–0	4–2	4–0	4–5	1–0	0–0
Racing Club Luxembourg	1–1	0–3		2–3	5–1	3–1	0–2	0–4
Red Boys Differdange	2–3	4–4	2–5		13–0	7–0	2–4	2–1
Rumelange	1–8	3–7	1–4	0–2		2–12	0–3 (Note: Match awarded.)	3–4
SC Luxembourg	0–2	2–1	2–0	0–0	3–0		6–0	1–3
Stade Dudelange	0–4	3–3	3–1	4–2	3–0	3–1		1–2
Union Luxembourg	0–3	0–1	2–1	0–1	5–0	1–1	2–1	

Legend: Blue = home team win; Yellow = draw; Red = away team win.
