= 1915–16 Luxembourg National Division =

6th season of top flight football in Luxembourg

Luxembourg National Division
- Season: 1915–16
- Champions: US Hollerich (3rd title)
- Matches: 30
- Goals: 141 (4.7 per match)
- Highest scoring: Jeunesse Esch 1–11 US Hollerich

The 1915–16 Luxembourg National Division was the 6th season of top level association football in Luxembourg.

== Overview ==
It was contested by 6 teams, and US Hollerich Bonnevoie won the championship.

== League standings ==
Pos	Team	Pld	W	D	L	GF	GA	GD	Pts
1	US Hollerich Bonnevoie	10	7	2	1	35	13	+22	16
2	Sporting Club Luxembourg	10	6	2	2	23	16	+7	14
3	CS Fola Esch	10	3	4	3	28	23	+5	10
4	Racing Club Luxembourg	10	4	2	4	23	19	+4	10
5	Jeunesse Esch	10	2	1	7	16	35	−19	5
6	Stade Dudelange	10	2	1	7	16	35	−19	5

Source: rsssf.com

== Results ==
Home \ Away	FOL	HOL	JEU	RAC	SCL	STD
Fola Esch		4–4	6–1	1–1	2–2	3–0
US Hollerich	3–1		2–1	2–1	3–0	0–0
Jeunesse Esch	1–1	1–11		1–3	0–2	3–0
Racing Club Luxembourg	3–1	1–4	3–2		0–0	8–3
SC Luxembourg	5–1	1–4	6–2	2–1		1–0
Stade Dudelange	3–8	3–2	1–4	3–2	3–4	

Legend: Blue = home team win; Yellow = draw; Red = away team win.
