= 1945–46 Luxembourg National Division =

Luxembourg National Division
- Season: 1945–46
- Champions: Stade Dudelange (4th title)
- Matches: 90
- Goals: 368 (4.09 per match)
- Highest scoring: US Dudelange 7–3 FC Progrès Niedercorn; FC Progrès Niedercorn 6–4 National Schifflange

The 1945–46 Luxembourg National Division was the 32nd season of top level association football in Luxembourg.

== Overview ==
It was performed in 10 teams, and Stade Dudelange won the championship.

== League standings ==
| Pos | Team | Pld | W | D | L | GF | GA | GD | Pts |
|---|---|---|---|---|---|---|---|---|---|
| 1 | Stade Dudelange | 18 | 15 | 2 | 1 | 62 | 15 | +47 | 32 |
| 2 | US Dudelange | 18 | 11 | 2 | 5 | 53 | 32 | +21 | 24 |
| 3 | FC Progrès Niedercorn | 18 | 9 | 3 | 6 | 45 | 41 | +4 | 21 |
| 4 | FA Red Boys Differdange | 18 | 10 | 0 | 8 | 36 | 28 | +8 | 20 |
| 5 | CA Spora Luxembourg | 18 | 8 | 2 | 8 | 28 | 41 | −13 | 18 |
| 6 | Chiers Rodange | 18 | 6 | 3 | 9 | 23 | 32 | −9 | 15 |
| 7 | National Schifflange | 18 | 6 | 3 | 9 | 35 | 53 | −18 | 15 |
| 8 | Union Luxembourg | 18 | 5 | 3 | 10 | 34 | 32 | +2 | 13 |
| 9 | CS Fola Esch | 18 | 5 | 3 | 10 | 26 | 44 | −18 | 13 |
| 10 | CS Pétange | 18 | 3 | 3 | 12 | 26 | 50 | −24 | 9 |

Source: rsssf.com

== Results ==
| Home \ Away | CHI | USD | FOL | NAT | PÉT | PRO | RBD | SPO | STD | UNI |
|---|---|---|---|---|---|---|---|---|---|---|
| Chiers Rodange | | 1–4 | 3–0 | 3–0 | 3–1 | 0–1 | 0–4 | 1–1 | 1–2 | 1–1 |
| US Dudelange | 2–1 | | 3–2 | 8–0 | 1–1 | 7–3 | 3–0 | 7–0 | 0–4 | 1–4 |
| Fola Esch | 1–0 | 2–0 | | 1–3 | 4–1 | 2–2 | 1–3 | 0–2 | 1–7 | 1–1 |
| National Schifflange | 0–2 | 2–2 | 3–1 | | 3–2 | 2–2 | 2–5 | 3–0 | 1–5 | 4–1 |
| Pétange | 2–2 | 1–3 | 4–3 | 3–3 | | 1–3 | 0–1 | 1–2 | 2–1 | 1–0 |
| Progrès Niederkorn | 4–0 | 0–4 | 2–2 | 6–4 | 8–1 | | 3–0 | 3–1 | 1–5 | 2–1 |
| Red Boys Differdange | 1–2 | 1–3 | 0–2 | 4–0 | 3–2 | 3–1 | | 4–1 | 0–1 | 3–0 |
| Spora Luxembourg | 1–2 | 4–2 | 2–1 | 2–1 | 2–1 | 3–1 | 3–0 | | 0–0 | 1–5 |
| Stade Dudelange | 3–0 | 5–1 | 7–0 | 4–1 | 3–1 | 5–2 | 2–1 | 5–1 | | 1–0 |
| Union Luxembourg | 4–1 | 1–2 | 1–2 | 2–3 | 5–1 | 0–1 | 2–3 | 4–2 | 2–2 | |

Legend: Blue = home team win; Yellow = draw; Red = away team win.
