= 1909–10 Luxembourg National Division =

1st season of top flight football in Luxembourg

Luxembourg National Division
- Season: 1909–10
- Champions: Racing Club Luxembourg (1st title)

The 1909–10 Luxembourg National Division was the 1st season of top level association football in Luxembourg.

== Overview ==
It was performed by 9 teams, and Racing Club Luxembourg won the championship after a play-off final match. Only the final placing is known, with Racing and US Hollerich ending tied on points.

== League standings ==
Pos	Team	Qualification
1	Racing Club Luxembourg (C)	Qualified for Final Tie-break
2	US Hollerich	Qualified for Final Tie-break
3	Sporting Club Luxembourg	
4	Jeunesse Esch	
5	US Rumelange	
6	Jeunesse Echternach	
7	Chiers Rodange	
8	The National Esch	
9	Gallia Dudelange	

(C) Champions

== Final ==
Team 1	Score	Team 2
Racing Club Luxembourg	3–2	US Hollerich
