= 1921–22 Luxembourg National Division =

Luxembourg National Division
- Season: 1921–22
- Champions: CS Fola Esch (3rd title)
- Matches: 56
- Goals: 271 (4.84 per match)
- Highest scoring: Tricolore Muhlenweg 3–9 Sporting Club Luxembourg

The 1921–22 Luxembourg National Division was the 12th season of top level association football in Luxembourg.

== Overview ==
It was contested by 8 teams, and CS Fola Esch won the championship.

== League standings ==
Pos	Team	Pld	W	D	L	GF	GA	GD	Pts
1	CS Fola Esch	14	10	2	2	48	24	+24	22
2	Union Luxembourg	14	9	2	3	46	21	+25	20
3	Jeunesse Esch	14	8	0	6	50	30	+20	16
4	Sporting Club Luxembourg	14	7	2	5	43	26	+17	16
5	Stade Dudelange	14	6	4	4	26	24	+2	16
6	FA Red Boys Differdange	14	6	1	7	31	28	+3	13
7	Tricolore Muhlenweg	14	2	1	11	17	65	−48	5
8	National Schifflange	14	1	2	11	10	53	−43	4

Source: rsssf.com

== Results ==
Home \ Away	FOL	JEU	NAT	RBD	SCL	STD	TRI	UNI
Fola Esch		5–4	5–1	3–1	3–2	5–0	8–1	3–1
Jeunesse Esch	7–1		6–0	3–2	2–1	4–1	3–1	2–3
National Schifflange	0–3	3–4		1–5	0–9	0–2	1–0	0–1
Red Boys Differdange	1–4	2–1	4–0		2–1	1–3	6–1	3–1
SC Luxembourg	1–1	4–1	5–2	4–1		3–0	2–1	1–1
Stade Dudelange	1–1	3–2	0–0	2–2	6–1		3–0	3–1
Tricolore Muhlenweg	0–3	0–9	2–2	2–1	3–9	3–1		1–8
Union Luxembourg	4–3	4–2	7–0	4–0	3–0 (Note: Match awarded.)	1–1	7–2	

Legend: Blue = home team win; Yellow = draw; Red = away team win.
