= Cyril Serredszum =

French former professional footballer (born 1971)

Personal information
- Date of birth: 2 October 1971 (age 55)
- Place of birth: Metz, France
- Position: Midfielder

Team information
- Current team: Metz (scout)

Youth career
- Metz

Senior career*
Years	Team	Apps	(Gls)
1989–1998	Metz	254	(5)
1998–2000	Montpellier	28	(0)
2000–2002	Martigues	25	(0)
2002–2006	CSO Amnéville		
Total		307	(5)

Managerial career
- 2005–2006: CSO Amnéville (player-manager)
- 2006–2008: Metz (assistant)
- 2008–2010: CSO Amnéville (U19)
- 2010: Strasbourg (assistant)
- 2010–2017: Fola Esch (assistant)
- 2017–2018: Fola Esch
- 2018–2019: Progrès Niederkorn
- 2020: Titus Pétange
- 2020–: Metz (scout)
- * Club domestic league appearances and goals

Cyril Serredszum (born 2 October 1971) is a French football coach and scout and former professional player who played as a midfielder. He works as a scout for FC Metz.

== Career ==
Serredszum played for Metz, Montpellier and Martigues. While at Metz he played in the final as they won the 1995–96 Coupe de la Ligue.

He was a coach at Luxembourg club Fola Esch between May and July 2011.

In December 2020, Serredszum was hired as a scout for FC Metz.

== Honours ==
Metz

- Coupe de la Ligue: 1995–96

Montpellier

- UEFA Intertoto Cup: 1999
