= Emanuel Cabral =

Luxembourgish footballer (born 1996)

Personal information
- Full name: Emanuel Tomas Cabral
- Date of birth: 2 August 1996 (age 30)
- Place of birth: Luxembourg
- Position: Goalkeeper

Team information
- Current team: CS Fola Esch
- Number: 1

Senior career*
Years	Team	Apps	(Gls)
2016–	CS Fola Esch	109	(0)
- * Club domestic league appearances and goals as of 6 June 2026

Emanuel Tomas Cabral (born 2 August 1996) is a Luxembourgish footballer who plays as a goalkeeper for CS Fola Esch.

== Early life ==
Cabral started playing as goalkeeper at the age of fourteen.

== Club career ==
Cabral started his career with Luxembourgish side CS Fola Esch, helping the club win the league. He played for the club in the UEFA Europa Conference League, helping them win four consecutive games.

== International career ==
Cabral has been called up to the Luxembourg national football team.

== Style of play ==
Cabral has been described as being "known as a loud and emotional goalkeeper".

== Personal life ==
Cabral was born to a Brazil-born father and an Angola-born mother.
