= 1911–12 Luxembourg National Division =

3rd season of top flight football in Luxembourg

Luxembourg National Division
- Season: 1911–12
- Champions: US Hollerich (1st title)
- Matches: 12
- Goals: 73 (6.08 per match)

The 1911–12 Luxembourg National Division was the 3rd season of top level association football in Luxembourg.

== Overview ==
It was performed by 4 teams, and US Hollerich won the championship.

== League standings ==
Pos	Team	Pld	W	D	L	GF	GA	GD	Pts	HOL	SCL	RAC	DAR
1	US Hollerich	6	3	2	1	21	10	+11	8		1–1	4–2	9–1
2	SC Luxembourg	6	3	2	1	24	9	+15	8	3–2		2–2	12–0
3	Racing Club Luxembourg	6	3	1	2	23	11	+12	7	1–3	3–1		9–0
4	Daring Club Eich	6	0	1	5	5	43	−38	1	2–2	1–5	1–6	

Source: fussball-lux.lu
Legend: Blue = home team win; Yellow = draw; Red = away team win.
