= 2009–10 Luxembourg Cup =

85th edition of the Luxembourg Cup

Tournament details
- Country: Luxembourg

Final positions
- Champions: FC Differdange 03
- Runners-up: CS Grevenmacher

The 2009–10 Luxembourg Cup was the 85th season of Luxembourg's annual cup competition. It began on 2 September 2009 with Round 1 and ended on 30 May 2010 with the Final held at a neutral venue. The winners of the competition qualified for the second qualifying round of the 2010–11 UEFA Europa League. F91 Dudelange were the defending champions, having won their fourth cup title last season.

== Round 1 ==
Fifty-one teams from Division 2 (IV) and Division 3 (V) entered in this round. Thirty-eight of them competed in matches, with the other thirteen teams were awarded a bye. The games were played on September 2, 2009.

Team 1	Score	Team 2
Red Star Merl	1–1 (a.e.t.); 2−4 (pen)	Résidence Walferdange
SC Ell	5–1	US Fuelen
FC Les Aiglons Dalheim	4–0	Excelsior Grevels
Jeunesse Useldange	2–1	US Folschette
Jeunesse Biwer	5–1	Vinesca Ehnen
US Moutfort	1–2	Red Boys Aspelt
FC Les Ardoisiers Perlé	0–3	US Berdorf/Consdorf 01
Jeunesse Koerich	0–3	FC Red Black Égalité Pfaffenthal/Weimerskirch
Jeunesse Gilsdorf	0–2	Rupensia Larochette
FC Brouch	9–0	Sporting Beckerich
Minière Lasauvage	5–2	Amis de la Moselle Remerschen
US Esch	5–2	FC The Belval Belvaux
Titus Lamadelaine	8–1	FC Kiischpelt Wilwerwiltz
Blo Weiss Medernach	3–0	US Rambrouch
FC Noertzange HF	1–5	Syra Mensdorf
ES Schouweiler	2–0	Racing Heiderscheid
Jeunesse Junglinster	9–2	US Bous
AS Hosingen	3–4 (a.e.t.)	Berdenia Berbourg
Racing Troisvierges	2–3 (a.e.t.)	CS Bourscheid

Bye: Blo Weiss Itzig, US Boevange, Claravallis Clervaux, FC Kopstal, Luna Oberkorn, AS Luxembourg-Porto, Olympia Christnach, Orania Vianden, FC Pratzerthal/Rédange, US Reisdorf, AS Remich, FC Schifflange 95, Yellow Boys Weiler

== Round 2 ==
The winners of Round 1 and those teams that got a bye competed in this round. The games were played on September 27, 2009.

Team 1	Score	Team 2
FC Red Black Égalité Pfaffenthal/Weimerskirch	0–0 (a.e.t.); 5−4 (pen)	Luna Oberkorn
Jeunesse Biwer	0–1	Syra Mensdorf
SC Ell	3–2	Berdenia Berbourg
US Berdorf/Consdorf 01	3–1	AS Luxembourg-Porto
Yellow Boys Weiler	5–0	FC Kopstal
US Boevange	5–1	Jeunesse Useldange
CS Bourscheid	1–4	FC Schifflange 95
Olympia Christnach	0–2	US Esch
Résidence Walferdange	1–1 (a.e.t.); 7−5 (pen)	FC Les Aiglons Dalheim
Jeunesse Junglinster	1–2 (a.e.t.)	Red Boys Aspelt
FC Pratzerthal/Rédange	4–3 (a.e.t.)	ES Schouweiler
AS Remich	1–0	Orania Vianden
Titus Lamadelaine	3–1	Claravallis Clervaux
FC Brouch	7–0	US Reisdorf
Minière Lasauvage	2–1	Blo Weiss Itzig
Blo Weiss Medernach	5–0	Rupensia Larochette

== Round 3 ==
The sixteen winners of Round 2 competed in this round, as well as twenty-eight teams from Division 1 (III), which entered the competition in this round. The games were played on 29, 30 and 31 October 2009.

Team 1	Score	Team 2
FC Cebra 01	1–0	FC Mamer 32
FC Ehlerange	2–3	CS Sanem
UNA Strassen	0–0 (a.e.t.); 3−4 (pen)	FC Schifflange 95
Yellow Boys Weiler	1–2 (a.e.t.)	Alliance Aischdall Hobscheid/Eischen
Sporting Bertrange	3–4	FF Norden 02
Green Boys Harlange/Tarchamps	2–1	FC Bastendorf
Marisca Mersch	3–0	Résidence Walferdange
Alisontia Steinsel	0–2	Red Boys Aspelt
Minière Lasauvage	1–7	US Mondorf
SC Ell	0–0 (a.e.t.); 2−4 (pen)	Union Mertert/Wasserbillig
FC Brouch	1–3 (a.e.t.)	SC Bettembourg
Tricolore Gasperich	0–0 (a.e.t.); 5−4 (pen)	Udinesia Flaxweiler/Beyren
FC Red Black Égalité Pfaffenthal/Weimerskirch	3–2	US Berdorf/Consdorf 01
Syra Mensdorf	5–6	Atert Bissen
Titus Lamadelaine	0–3	Daring Echternach
FC Pratzerthal/Rédange	2–1	FC Munsbach
Sporting Mertzig	3–1	FC Kehlen
Cercle Sportif Muhlenbach Lusitanos	2–0	FC Rodange 91
AS Remich	2–5	US Esch
FC Lorentzweiler	2–1	US Boevange
AS Wincrange	3–2	Blo Weiss Medernach
ES Clemency	3–2	US Sandweiler

== Round 4 ==
Twenty-two winners of Round 3 competed in this round, as well as fourteen teams from the Division of Honour (II), which entered the competition in this round. The games were played on 3, 4, 5 and 6 December 2009.

Team 1	Score	Team 2
Young Boys Diekirch	3–1	SC Bettembourg
US Hostert	0–2	Minerva Lintgen
FC Erpeldange	3–0	FC Lorentzweiler
Atert Bissen	4–3 (a.e.t.)	AS Colmarberg
FC Red Black Égalité Pfaffenthal/Weimerskirch	1–2	FC Schifflange 95
FF Norden 02	3–3 (a.e.t.); 7−8 (pen)	Daring Echternach
Union Mertert/Wasserbillig	3–0	CS Sanem
FC Pratzerthal/Rédange	1–2	Jeunesse Schieren
Koeppchen Wormeldange	1–3	ES Clemency
SC Steinfort	6–2	Red Boys Aspelt
Green Boys Harlange/Tarchamps	2–3	CS Oberkorn
Tricolore Gasperich	3–3 (a.e.t.); 11−10 (pen)	Alliance Aischdall Hobscheid/Eischen
Avenir Beggen	1–0	Marisca Mersch
US Esch	4–0	FC Cebra 01
US Mondorf	4–3	Union 05 Kayl/Tétange
AS Wincrange	1–4 (a.e.t.)	Jeunesse Canach
Sporting Mertzig	4–3 (a.e.t.)	Cercle Sportif Muhlenbach Lusitanos
FC Victoria Rosport	0–5	FC Wiltz 71

== Round 5 ==
Eighteen winners of Round 4 competed in this round, as well as fourteen teams from the National Division, which entered the competition in this round. The games were played on 26, 27 and 28 February 2010.

Team 1	Score	Team 2
FC Schifflange 95	1–3	UN Käerjeng 97
Minerva Lintgen	1–3 (a.e.t.)	Pétange
US Mondorf	0–2	RM Hamm Benfica
Avenir Beggen	1–2	Fola Esch
Jeunesse Canach	2–1	Racing FC
Young Boys Diekirch	3–2	Jeunesse Esch
US Esch	0–1	Swift Hesperange
FC Erpeldange	1–3	F91 Dudelange
Atert Bissen	1–6	FC Differdange 03
FC Wiltz 71	0–0 (a.e.t.); 6−7 (pen)	US Rumelange
SC Steinfort	0–1	Etzella Ettelbruck
ES Clemency	2–0	Jeunesse Schieren
Sporting Mertzig	2–4	CS Grevenmacher
Daring Echternach	2–4 (a.e.t.)	Mondercange
Tricolore Gasperich	0–7	Progrès Niedercorn
Union Mertert/Wasserbillig	0–1	CS Oberkorn

== Round 6 ==
The winners of Round 5 competed in this round. The games were played on 3 April 2010.

Team 1	Score	Team 2
CS Oberkorn	0–3	FC Differdange 03
Mondercange	0–0 (a.e.t.); 4−3 (pen)	Progrès Niedercorn
Young Boys Diekirch	1–2	Swift Hesperange
ES Clemency	1–4 (a.e.t.)	CS Grevenmacher
Etzella Ettelbruck	2–1 (a.e.t.)	Pétange
RM Hamm Benfica	1–2	F91 Dudelange
Fola Esch	4–2 (a.e.t.)	UN Käerjeng 97
Jeunesse Canach	0–0 (a.e.t.); 4−3 (pen)	US Rumelange

== Quarter-finals ==
1 May 2010
18:00 CEST

FC Differdange 03	3–0	Mondercange

Stade du Thillenberg, Differdange

2 May 2010
16:00 CEST

CS Grevenmacher	4–2	Jeunesse Canach

Op Flohr Stadion, Grevenmacher

2 May 2010
16:00 CEST

F91 Dudelange	2–2 (a.e.t.)	Fola Esch
Penalties
	9–10

Stade Jos Nosbaum, Dudelange

2 May 2010
16:00 CEST

Etzella Ettelbruck	2–1	Swift Hesperange

Stade Am Deich, Ettelbruck

== Semi-finals ==
25 May 2010
20:30 CEST

CS Grevenmacher	5–1	Fola Esch

26 May 2010
20:30 CEST

FC Differdange 03	3–1	Etzella Ettelbruck

== Final ==
30 May 2010
17:00 CEST

CS Grevenmacher	0–1	FC Differdange 03
		Soraire 89'

Stade Josy Barthel, Luxembourg City
Attendance: 2,504
Referee: Serge Parage
