= 1913–14 Luxembourg National Division =

4th season of top flight football in Luxembourg

Luxembourg National Division
- Season: 1913–14
- Champions: US Hollerich (2nd title)

The 1913–14 Luxembourg National Division was the fourth season of top level association football in Luxembourg.

== Overview ==
It was performed by 6 teams, and US Hollerich won the championship.

== League standings ==
Pos	Team
1	US Hollerich
2	Sporting Club Luxembourg
3	Racing Club Luxembourg
4	SC Differdange
5	Jeunesse Esch
6	CS Pétange

Source: rsssf.com
