= 1928–29 Luxembourg National Division =

Luxembourg National Division
- Season: 1928–29
- Champions: CA Spora Luxembourg (3rd title)
- Matches: 56
- Goals: 229 (4.09 per match)
- Highest scoring: CA Spora Luxembourg 7–1 Progres Niedercorn

The 1928–29 Luxembourg National Division was the 19th season of top level association football in Luxembourg.

== Overview ==
It was contested by 8 teams, and CA Spora Luxembourg won the championship.

== League standings ==
Pos	Team	Pld	W	D	L	GF	GA	GD	Pts
1	CA Spora Luxembourg	14	7	5	2	42	22	+20	19
2	CS Fola Esch	14	8	2	4	33	32	+1	18
3	FA Red Boys Differdange	14	6	5	3	33	19	+14	17
4	Jeunesse Esch	14	6	3	5	27	27	0	15
5	FC Progrès Niedercorn	14	5	4	5	33	34	−1	14
6	FC Red Black Pfaffenthal	14	4	5	5	20	25	−5	13
7	AS Differdange	14	4	3	7	22	29	−7	11
8	Stade Dudelange	14	1	3	10	19	41	−22	5

Source: rsssf.com

== Results ==
Home \ Away	ASD	FOL	JEU	PRO	RBP	RBD	SPO	STD
AS Differdange		2–3	2–0	1–5	3–0 (Note: Match awarded.)	0–1	2–4	3–1
Fola Esch	4–1		3–2	4–3	1–2	2–2	3–1	3–1
Jeunesse Esch	1–1	2–1		3–1	2–2	2–1	1–1	2–0
Progrès Niederkorn	2–2	2–2	4–1		1–2	4–3	2–4	0–0
Red Black Pfaffenthal	2–0	1–2	1–2	2–2		0–2	2–2	2–0
Red Boys Differdange	1–1	4–0	5–2	1–3	4–0		1–1	5–1
Spora Luxembourg	3–0	6–1	4–2	7–1	1–1	2–2		4–1
Stade Dudelange	2–4	3–4	1–5	2–3	3–3	1–1	3–2	

Legend: Blue = home team win; Yellow = draw; Red = away team win.
