= Luxembourg Cup =

Association football tournament in Luxembourg

- Founded: 1921
- Region: Luxembourg
- Teams: 100
- Qualifier for: UEFA Europa Conference League
- Current champions: Differdange (7th title)
- Most championships: Red Boys Differdange (15 titles)
- 2025–26 Luxembourg Cup

The Luxembourg Cup (French: Coupe de Luxembourg) is the national knockout cup competition in Luxembourgian football. It was first held in 1922, and has been held annually since, with the exception of the four seasons during the German occupation during Second World War, though the 2019–20 and 2020–21 seasons were unable to be completed due to the COVID-19 pandemic. The Stade de Luxembourg hosts the final of the tournament.

== Winners ==
Year	Winner	Score	Runner-up
1921–22	Racing Club Luxembourg	2–0	Jeunesse Esch
1922–23	Fola Esch	3–0	Union Luxembourg
1923–24	Fola Esch	2–0	Red Boys Differdange
1924–25	Red Boys Differdange	1–1 aet 3–0 (R)	Spora Luxembourg
1925–26	Red Boys Differdange	5–2	Union Luxembourg
1926–27	Red Boys Differdange	3–2	Jeunesse Esch
1927–28	Spora Luxembourg	2–2 aet 3–3 aet (R) 5–2 (R)	Stade Dudelange
1928–29	Red Boys Differdange	5–3	Spora Luxembourg
1929–30	Red Boys Differdange	2–1	Spora Luxembourg
1930–31	Red Boys Differdange	5–3	Spora Luxembourg
1931–32	Spora Luxembourg	2–1	Red Boys Differdange
1932–33	Progrès Niederkorn	4–1	Union Luxembourg
1933–34	Red Boys Differdange	5–2	Spora Luxembourg
1934–35	Jeunesse Esch	4–2	Red Boys Differdange
1935–36	Red Boys Differdange	2–0	Stade Dudelange
1936–37	Jeunesse Esch	3–0	Union Luxembourg
1937–38	Stade Dudelange	1–0	National Schifflange
1938–39	US Dudelange	2–1	Stade Dudelange
1939–40	Spora Luxembourg	6–2	Stade Dudelange
1940–1944	Not Held due to World War II		
1944–45	Progrès Niederkorn	2–0	Spora Luxembourg
1945–46	Jeunesse Esch	3–1	Progrès Niederkorn
1946–47	Union Luxembourg	2–1	Stade Dudelange
1947–48	Stade Dudelange	1–0	Red Boys Differdange
1948–49	Stade Dudelange	1–0	Racing Rodange
1949–50	Spora Luxembourg	5–1	Red Boys Differdange
1950–51	SC Tétange	1–1 aet 2–0 (R)	CS Grevenmacher
1951–52	Red Boys Differdange	1–0	Red Star Merl
1952–53	Red Boys Differdange	2–1	CS Grevenmacher
1953–54	Jeunesse Esch	5–0	CS Grevenmacher
1954–55	Fola Esch	1–1 aet 4–1 (R)	Red Boys Differdange
1955–56	Stade Dudelange	3–1	Progrès Niederkorn
1956–57	Spora Luxembourg	2–1	Stade Dudelange
1957–58	Red Boys Differdange	2–1	US Dudelange
1958–59	Union Luxembourg	3–1	CS Grevenmacher
1959–60	National Schifflange	3–0	Stade Dudelange
1960–61	Alliance Dudelange	3–2	Union Luxembourg
1961–62	Alliance Dudelange	1–0	Union Luxembourg
1962–63	Union Luxembourg	2–1	Spora Luxembourg
1963–64	Union Luxembourg	1–0	Aris Bonnevoie
1964–65	Spora Luxembourg	1–0	Jeunesse Esch
1965–66	Spora Luxembourg	2–0	Jeunesse Esch
1966–67	Aris Bonnevoie	1–0	Union Luxembourg
1967–68	US Rumelange	0–0 aet 1–0 (R)	Aris Bonnevoie
1968–69	Union Luxembourg	5–2	Alliance Dudelange
1969–70	Union Luxembourg	1–0	Red Boys Differdange
1970–71	Jeunesse Hautcharage	4–1	Jeunesse Esch
1971–72	Red Boys Differdange	4–3	Aris Bonnevoie
1972–73	Jeunesse Esch	3–2	Fola Esch
1973–74	Jeunesse Esch	4–1	Avenir Beggen
1974–75	US Rumelange	2–0	Jeunesse Esch
1975–76	Jeunesse Esch	2–1	Aris Bonnevoie
1976–77	Progrès Niederkorn	4–4 aet 3–1 (R)	Red Boys Differdange
1977–78	Progrès Niederkorn	2–1	Union Luxembourg
1978–79	Red Boys Differdange	4–1	Aris Bonnevoie
1979–80	Spora Luxembourg	3–2	Progrès Niederkorn
1980–81	Jeunesse Esch	5–0	Olympique Eischen
1981–82	Red Boys Differdange	2–1	US Rumelange
1982–83	Avenir Beggen	4–2	Union Luxembourg
1983–84	Avenir Beggen	4–1	Union Luxembourg
1984–85	Red Boys Differdange	1–0	Jeunesse Esch
1985–86	Union Luxembourg	4–1	Red Boys Differdange
1986–87	Avenir Beggen	6–0	Spora Luxembourg
1987–88	Jeunesse Esch	1–0	Avenir Beggen
1988–89	Union Luxembourg	2–0	Avenir Beggen
1989–90	Swift Hesperange	3–3 aet 7–1 (R)	AS Differdange
1990–91	Union Luxembourg	3–0	Jeunesse Esch
1991–92	Avenir Beggen	1–0	CS Pétange
1992–93	Avenir Beggen	5–2	F91 Dudelange
1993–94	Avenir Beggen	3–1	F91 Dudelange
1994–95	CS Grevenmacher	1–1 aet 3–2 (R)	Jeunesse Esch
1995–96	Union Luxembourg	3–1	Jeunesse Esch
1996–97	Jeunesse Esch	2–0	Union Luxembourg
1997–98	CS Grevenmacher	2–0	Avenir Beggen
1998–99	Jeunesse Esch	3–0	FC Mondercange
1999–2000	Jeunesse Esch	4–1	FC Mondercange
2000–01	Etzella Ettelbruck	5–3	FC Wiltz 71
2001–02	Avenir Beggen	1–0	F91 Dudelange
2002–03	CS Grevenmacher	1–0	Etzella Ettelbruck
2003–04	F91 Dudelange	3–1 aet	Etzella Ettelbruck
2004–05	CS Pétange	5–0	FC CeBra 01
2005–06	F91 Dudelange	3–2	Jeunesse Esch
2006–07	F91 Dudelange	2–1	UN Käerjéng 97
2007–08	CS Grevenmacher	4–1	Victoria Rosport
2008–09	F91 Dudelange	5–0	UN Käerjéng 97
2009–10	FC Differdange 03	1–0	CS Grevenmacher
2010–11	FC Differdange 03	1–0	F91 Dudelange
2011–12	F91 Dudelange	4–2 aet	Jeunesse Esch
2012–13	Jeunesse Esch	2–1	Differdange 03
2013–14	Differdange 03	2–0	F91 Dudelange
2014–15	Differdange 03	1–1 aet (3–2 pen.)	F91 Dudelange
2015–16	F91 Dudelange	1–0	Mondorf-les-Bains
2016–17	F91 Dudelange	4–1	Fola Esch
2017–18	Racing FC	0–0 aet (4–3 pen.)	Hostert
2018–19	F91 Dudelange	5–0	Etzella Ettelbruck
2019–20	abandoned due to COVID-19 pandemic		
2020–21	abandoned due to COVID-19 pandemic		
2021–22	Racing FC	3–2	F91 Dudelange
2022–23	Differdange 03	4–2	Marisca Mersch
2023–24	Progrès Niederkorn	1–1 aet (3–1 pen.)	Swift Hesperange
2024–25	Differdange 03	2–2 aet (5–4 pen.)	F91 Dudelange
2025–26	Differdange 03	4–1	Victoria Rosport

== Performances ==
=== Performance by club ===
Club	Titles	Runners-up	Winning years
FA Red Boys Differdange	15	9	1925, 1926, 1927, 1929, 1930, 1931, 1934, 1936, 1952, 1953, 1958, 1972, 1979, 1982, 1985
Jeunesse Esch	13	12	1935, 1937, 1946, 1954, 1973, 1974, 1976, 1981, 1988, 1997, 1999, 2000, 2013
Union Luxembourg	10	10	1947, 1959, 1963, 1964, 1969, 1970, 1986, 1989, 1991, 1996
CA Spora Luxembourg	8	8	1928, 1932, 1940, 1950, 1957, 1965, 1966, 1980
F91 Dudelange	8	8	2004, 2006, 2007, 2009, 2012, 2016, 2017, 2019
FC Avenir Beggen	7	4	1983, 1984, 1987, 1992, 1993, 1994, 2002
Differdange 03	7	1	2010, 2011, 2014, 2015, 2023, 2025, 2026
Progrès Niederkorn	5	3	1933, 1945, 1977, 1978, 2024
Stade Dudelange	4	7	1938, 1948, 1949, 1956
CS Grevenmacher	4	5	1995, 1998, 2003, 2008
CS Fola Esch	3	2	1923, 1924, 1955
US Rumelange	2	2	1968, 1975
Alliance Dudelange	2	1	1961, 1962
Racing FC Union Luxembourg	2	-	2018, 2022
FC Aris Bonnevoie	1	5	1967
FC Etzella Ettelbruck	1	2	2001
CS Pétange	1	1	2005
Swift Hesperange	1	1	1990
National Schifflange	1	1	1960
US Dudelange	1	1	1939
Jeunesse Hautcharage	1	-	1971
Racing Club Luxembourg	1	-	1922
SC Tétange	1	-	1951
FC Mondercange	-	2	
Victoria Rosport	-	2	
Racing Rodange	-	1	
FC CeBra 01	-	1	
AS Differdange	-	1	
Olympique Eischen	-	1	
Red Star Merl	-	1	
UN Käerjéng 97	-	1	
FC Wiltz 71	-	1	
Mondorf-les-Bains	-	1	
Hostert	-	1	
Marisca Mersch	-	1	

- Teams in italic were dissolved or merged to form a new club.

=== Performance by town ===
Town	Titles	Runners-up	Teams
Luxembourg City	28	28	8: Union Luxembourg, CA Spora Luxembourg, FC Avenir Beggen, FC Aris Bonnevoie, Racing Club Luxembourg, Racing FC Union Luxembourg, FC CeBra 01, Red Star Merl
Differdange	21	11	3: FA Red Boys Differdange, Differdange 03, AS Differdange
Esch-sur-Alzette	16	14	2: Jeunesse Esch, CS Fola Esch
Dudelange	15	15	4: F91 Dudelange, Stade Dudelange, Alliance Dudelange, US Dudelange
Grevenmacher	4	5	1: CS Grevenmacher
Niederkorn	4	3	1: Progrès Niederkorn
Rumelange	2	2	1: US Rumelange
Ettelbruck	1	3	1: FC Etzella Ettelbruck
Pétange	1	1	1: CS Pétange
Schifflange	1	1	1: National Schifflange
Hautcharage	1	-	1: Jeunesse Hautcharage
Hesperange	1	-	1: Swift Hesperange
Tétange	1	-	1: SC Tétange
Mondercange	-	2	1: FC Mondercange
Rosport	-	2	2: Victoria Rosport
Bascharage	-	1	1: UN Käerjéng 97
Eischen	-	1	1: Olympique Eischen
Rodange	-	1	1: Racing Rodange
Wiltz	-	1	1: FC Wiltz 71
Mondorf-les-Bains	-	1	1: US Mondorf-les-Bains
Hostert	-	1	1: US Hostert

=== Performance by canton ===
Canton	Titles	Runners-up	Towns
Esch-sur-Alzette	60	50	10: Differdange, Dudelange, Esch-sur-Alzette, Mondercange, Niederkorn, Pétange, Rodange, Rumelange, Schifflange, Tétange
Luxembourg	29	29	3: Hesperange, Hostert, Luxembourg City
Grevenmacher	4	5	1: Grevenmacher
Capellen	1	2	2: Bascharage, Eischen, Hautcharage
Diekirch	1	3	1: Ettelbruck
Echternach	-	2	2: Rosport
Wiltz	-	1	1: Wiltz
Remich	-	1	1: Mondorf-les-Bains
