= JS Verlorenkost =

- Full name: Jeunesse Sportive Verlorenkost
- Nickname: –
- Manager: -
- League: -
Home colours	Away colours

JS Verlorenkost is a defunct football team which was merged with US Hollerich Bonnevoie to create Union Sportive Luxembourg in 1925.
