= 1923–24 Luxembourg National Division =

Luxembourg National Division
- Season: 1923–24
- Champions: CS Fola Esch (4th title)
- Matches: 56
- Goals: 224 (4 per match)
- Highest scoring: CS Fola Esch 9–3 FC Red Black Pfaffenthal

The 1923–24 Luxembourg National Division was the 14th season of top level association football in Luxembourg.

== Overview ==
It was contested by 8 teams, and CS Fola Esch won the championship.

== League standings ==
Pos	Team	Pld	W	D	L	GF	GA	GD	Pts
1	CS Fola Esch	14	11	1	2	45	14	+31	23
2	CA Spora Luxembourg	14	9	2	3	41	24	+17	20
3	FA Red Boys Differdange	14	8	2	4	28	13	+15	18
4	Jeunesse Esch	14	6	3	5	27	25	+2	15
5	Stade Dudelange	14	6	2	6	26	28	−2	14
6	Union Luxembourg	14	3	3	8	21	27	−6	9
7	FC Red Black Pfaffenthal	14	3	2	9	18	42	−24	8
8	Eclair Bettembourg	14	1	3	10	18	51	−33	5

Source: rsssf.com

== Results ==
Home \ Away	ECL	FOL	JEU	RBP	RBD	SPO	STD	UNI
Eclair Bettembourg		0–6	2–4	2–3	1–3	2–5	0–3 (Note: Match awarded.)	2–1
Fola Esch	5–1		3–1	9–3	2–0	3–0	6–0	3–0
Jeunesse Esch	7–2	1–2		1–0	3–0	1–1	2–1	2–1
Red Black Pfaffenthal	1–0	0–1	3–3		0–3	1–7	3–3	1–4
Red Boys Differdange	7–0	1–1	2–0	1–0		2–3	3–1	0–0
Spora Luxembourg	2–2	2–3	3–0	4–0	1–4		1–0	6–2
Stade Dudelange	3–3	2–1	4–1	3–1	0–2	1–2		3–2
Union Luxembourg	1–1	3–0	1–1	1–2	1–0	3–4	1–2	

Legend: Blue = home team win; Yellow = draw; Red = away team win.
