= 1929–30 Luxembourg National Division =

Luxembourg National Division
- Season: 1929–30
- Champions: CS Fola Esch (5th title)
- Matches: 56
- Goals: 229 (4.09 per match)
- Highest scoring: Union Luxembourg 0–9 Spora Luxembourg; Spora Luxembourg 8–1 Jeunesse Esch

The 1929–30 Luxembourg National Division was the 20th season of top level association football in Luxembourg.

== Overview ==
It was contested by 8 teams, and CS Fola Esch won the championship.

== League standings ==
Pos	Team	Pld	W	D	L	GF	GA	GD	Pts
1	CS Fola Esch	14	9	2	3	29	16	+13	20
2	CA Spora Luxembourg	14	8	3	3	47	31	+16	19
3	FA Red Boys Differdange	14	8	1	5	42	16	+26	17
4	FC Progrès Niedercorn	14	5	5	4	28	26	+2	15
5	FC Red Black Pfaffenthal	14	3	6	5	14	22	−8	12
6	Union Luxembourg	14	5	2	7	22	40	−18	12
7	US Dudelange	14	3	3	8	23	37	−14	9
8	Jeunesse Esch	14	3	2	9	24	41	−17	8

Source: rsssf.com

== Results ==
Home \ Away	USD	FOL	JEU	PRO	RBP	RBD	SPO	UNI
US Dudelange		2–4	1–1	2–1	3–0	1–4	1–2	4–1
Fola Esch	5–1		1–0	2–1	2–1	1–0	1–2	2–0
Jeunesse Esch	3–1	3–1		1–3	1–3	0–5	6–1	2–3
Progrès Niederkorn	3–0	1–1	5–0		1–1	2–1	1–2	2–0
Red Black Pfaffenthal	1–1	1–1	1–1	1–1		1–0	2–3	0–0
Red Boys Differdange	4–1	2–1	4–2	8–0	5–0		1–2	1–2
Spora Luxembourg	4–4	2–3	8–1	4–4	3–1	2–2		3–4
Union Luxembourg	4–1	0–4	4–3	3–3	0–1	1–5	0–9	

Legend: Blue = home team win; Yellow = draw; Red = away team win.
