= 2021–22 Luxembourg Cup =

Tournament details
- Country: Luxembourg

Final positions
- Champions: Racing FC
- Runners-up: F91 Dudelange

The 2021–22 Luxembourg Cup was the 97th year of the football knockout tournament in Luxembourg. The cup began on 8 September 2021. The winner of the cup has earned a place in the 2022–23 UEFA Europa Conference League.

The previous season's cup was abandoned due to the COVID-19 pandemic in Luxembourg.

== Preliminary round ==
Seven preliminary round matches were played on 8 September 2021.

Team 1	Score	Team 2
Red Star Merl-Belair	1–2	FC Munsbach
Olympia Christnach-Waldbillig	1–4	Kiischpelt Wilwerwiltz
Vinesca Ehnen	1–3	US Rambrouch
FC Les Androisier Perlé	1–3	Jeunesse Gilsdorf
FC Les Aiglons Dalheim	1-6	AS Colmarberg
FC Brouch	4–2	US Moutfort-Medingen
US Folschette	3–0	FC Kopstal 33

== First round ==
Thirty-two first round matches were played on 11 and 12 September 2021.

Team 1	Score	Team 2
Green Boys	3–5	Jeunesse Useldange
ES Clemency	0–7	CeBra 01
SC Ell	3–3 (a.e.t.) (2–3 p)	Rambrouch
Lorentzweiler	4–2	Norden
Jeunesse Biwer	1–3	Red Boys Aspelt
Minerva Lintgen	0–1	Résidence Walferdange
Claravallis Clerveaux	0–5	Syra Mensdorf
Racing Troisvierges	1–3	US Sandweiler
Oriana Vianden	3–2	Platzerthal-Redange
The Belval Belveaux	4–0	FC Ehlerange
Boevange / Attert	4–1	Luna Oberkorn
Tricolore Gasprich	1–3	Union Kayl-Tétange
Koerich	2–3	AS Colmarberg
Schengen	2–1	Elperdange
Folschette	0–3	Red Black / Egalité
URB	7–3	Sporting Mertzig
Luxembourg-Porto	0–1	Blo-Wäiss Izeg
Biekerech	4–6	Sanem
Kischpelt Wilwerwiltz	0–7	Wincrange
Kehlen	2–1	Stengefort
Ruspaenia Lusitanos	5–1	Noertzange
Schouweiler	0–4	Obercorn
Bourscheid	2–5	Avenir Beggen
Alliance Aischdall	5–4	Feulen
Heiderscheid / Eschdorf	3–2	Reisdorf
Munchbach	0–0	Daring Echternach
Excelsior Grevels	2–4	Miniére Lasauvage
Berdorf Consdorf	0–1	Young Boys
Les Andrroisier Perlé	1–0	Hosingen
Brouch	1–7	Koeppchen
Bastendorf	2–4	Sporting Bertrange
Jeunesse Schieren	1–2	Grevenmacher

== Second round ==
Thirty-two second round matches were played on 12 and 13 October 2021.

Team 1	Score	Team 2
Rambrouch	1–3	UN Käerjéng
Alliance Aischdall	1–3	Atert Bissen
Lorentzweiler	0–7	Fola Esch
Jeunesse Useldange	2–0	Jeunesse Junglinster
Boevange / Attert	0–13	Differdange 03
Colmarberg	0–11	Swift Hesperange
Les Ardoisier Perlé	1–10	Mondorf-les-Bains
Union Kayl-Tétange	4–4	UT Pétange
Wincrange	0–2	Bettembourg
Red Boys Aspelt	0–4	Alisontia Steinsel
Orania Vianden	0–4	Rodange
Syra Mensdorf	1–4	Schifflange
Red Black / Egalité	1–4	Wiltz
Kehlen	1–0	Berdenia Berbourg
Young Boys	0–4	Luxembourg City
Rupensa Lusitanos	1–0	Union Metert
Munsbach	1–3	Jeunesse Canach
Grevenmacher	0–2	Mamer
Koeppchen	0–1	Rumelange
The Belval Belvaux	0–3	Jeunesse d'Esch
Sandweiler	0–4	Hostert
Heiderscheid / Eschforf	0–4	Blô-Weiss Medernach
Miniére Lasauvage	3–8	Monnerich
CeBra 01	2–2	Progrès Niederkorn
Avernir Beggen	2–5	UNA Strassen
URB	0–11	Etzella Ettelbrück
Blo-Wäiss Izeg	0–6	Victoria Rosport
Schengen	3–4	Yellow Boys Weiler
Obercorn	0–4	F91 Dudelange
Sanem	0–2	Esch
Sporting Bertrange	1–3	Racing FC
Résidence Walferdange	0–1	Marisca Merch

== Third round ==
Sixteen third round matches were played on 30 and 31 October 2021.

Team 1	Score	Team 2
Progrés Niederkorn	1–1	Swift Hesperange
Victoris Rosport	2–4	UT Pétange
Alisontia Steinsel	2–6	F91 Dudelange
Jeunesse Useldange	2–4	Mondorf-les-Bains
Blô-Weiss Medernach	0–2	Fola Esch
Marisca Mersch	0–6	Racing FC
UN Käerjéng	3–2	Wiltz
Rumelange	0–5	Monnerich
Esch	1–1	Jeunesse d'Esch
Jeunesse Canach	2–1	Atert Bissen
Yellow Boys Weiler	1–0	Hostert
Kehlen	0–4	Etzelia Ettelbrück
Ruspensia Lusitanos	0–4	Differdange 03
Bettembourg	1–0	Mamer
Schifflange	3–0	Luxembourg City
UNA Strassen	2–1	Rodange

== Fourth round ==
Eight fourth round matches were played on 6 April 2022.

Team 1	Score	Team 2
UNA Strassen	0–1	UT Pétange
Mondorf-les-Bains	0–4	F91 Dudelange
Esch	3–9	Progrès Niederkorn
Bettembourg	2–4	Etzella Ettelbrück
Racing FC	1–0	Differdange 03
Schifflange	1–1	Jeunesse Canach
UN Käerjéng	2–0	Yellow Boys Weiler
Monnerich	0–4	Fola Esch

== Quarter-final ==
Four quarter-final matches were played on 20 April 2022.

Team 1	Score	Team 2
UN Käerjéng	0−4	Fola Esch
Schifflange	0−3	Racing FC
UT Pétange	2−0	Etzella Ettelbruck
Progrès Niederkorn	0−2 (a.e.t.)	F91 Dudelange

== Semi-final ==
Two semi-final matches were played on 11 May 2022.

Team 1	Score	Team 2
UT Pétange	0−1	Racing FC
Fola Esch	4−5	F91 Dudelange

== Final ==
27 May 2022
20:00

F91 Dudelange	2–3	Racing FC
Van Den Kerkhof 22'; Diouf 47'		Françoise 12'; Mabella 27', 70'

Stade de Luxembourg
Referee: Tun Sgura
