= US Hollerich Bonnevoie =

Defunct association football club in Luxembourg

- Full name: Union Sportive Hollerich Bonnevoie
- Nickname: -
- Founded: 2 February 1908
- Dissolved: 1925
- Manager: -
- League: -
Home colours	Away colours

US Hollerich Bonnevoie is a defunct football team which was merged with Jeunesse Sportive Verlorenkost to create Union Sportive Luxembourg in 1925. In 2005 this in turn was merged into Racing Union.

Their main claim to fame is winning the Luxembourg championship in 1916–17 with a 100% record: 10 games, 10 wins, 0 draws and 0 losses.

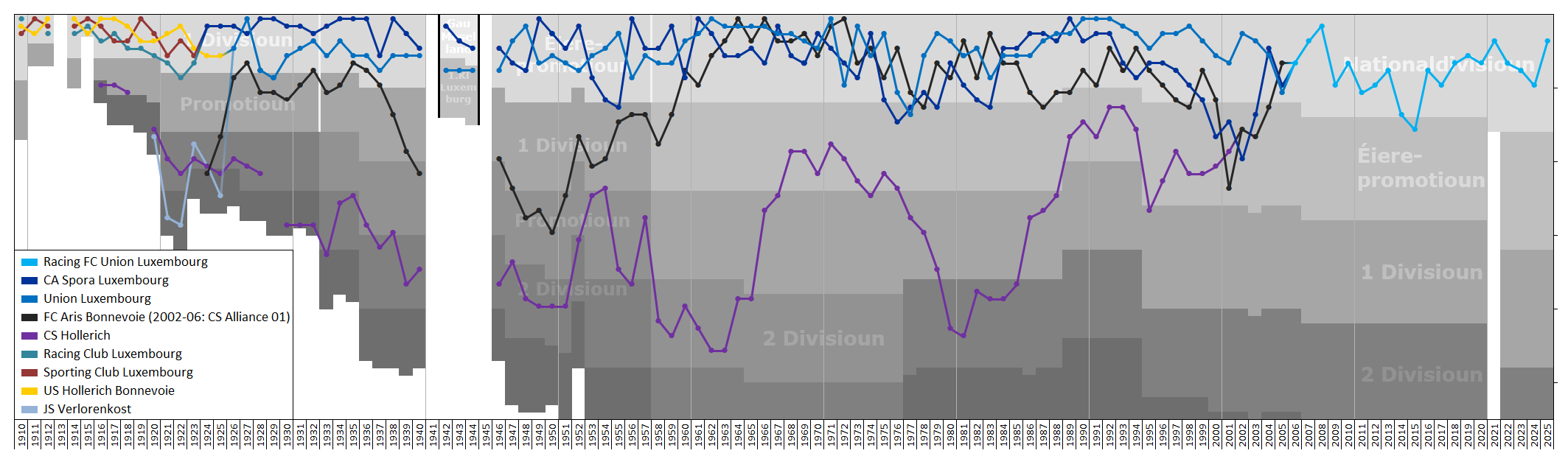
Historical league performance chart of Racing FC Union Luxembourg and its predecessors, including Hollerich Bonnevoie

== Honours ==
- National Division
  - Winners (5): 1911–12, 1913–14, 1914–15, 1915–16, 1916–17
  - Runners-up (2): 1909–10, 1917–18
