= FCM Young Boys Diekirch =

Association football club in Luxembourg

FCM Young Boys
- Full name: Football Club Municipal Young Boys Diekirch
- Founded: 21 September 1908; 118 years ago
- Ground: Stade Municipal, Diekirch
- President: Jean-Marie Dupont
- Manager: Carlos Pereira
- League: 1. Division Series 1
- 2025–26: 1. Division Series 1, 7th of 16
- Website: http://www.youngboys.lu/

FCM Young Boys Diekirch is a football club, based in Diekirch, in north-eastern Luxembourg. They currently compete in the 1. Division Series 1, the third tier of Luxembourgish football.

Historical chart of the club's league performance

== Honours ==
Coupe FLF:

- Champions (1): 1955–56
