= CS Fola Esch =

Association football club in Luxembourg

Fola Esch
- Full name: Cercle Sportif Fola Esch
- Founded: 9 December 1906; 119 years ago
- Ground: Stade Émile Mayrisch
- Capacity: 1,632
- President: Emil Adrovic
- Manager: Arnaud Bordi
- League: Division of Honour
- 2025–26: Division of Honour, 8th of 16
- Website: csfola.lu
Home colours	Away colours	Third colours

Cercle Sportif Fola Esch (English: Sporting Club Fola Esch), usually abbreviated to Fola Esch or simply Fola, is an association football club based in Esch-sur-Alzette, in south-western Luxembourg. They play their home games at Stade Émile Mayrisch, in the south of the city, which they share with their sister athletics club CA Fola Esch. They currently compete in the Division of Honour, the second tier of Luxembourgish football.

== History ==
Founded on 9 December 1906 by the English language teacher Jean Roeder, Fola was the first football club in Luxembourg. During its heyday, it was the best club in the country, winning four National Division championships and two Luxembourg Cups between 1918 and 1924. Fola won another championship in 1930 and the Luxembourg Cup in 1955, but had since this time lost its place in Luxembourg's top flight.

Fola stubbornly rejected a merger with its larger neighbours, Jeunesse Esch, during the wave of consolidation in the 1990s. In 2004–05, Fola were relegated to the third tier of Luxembourgish football, but were promoted the following season. In 2006–07 they finished third, qualifying for a promotion play-off, which they lost to Victoria Rosport. In August 2007, Fola pulled off a transfer coup by signing former Morocco midfielder Mustapha Hadji.

In 2008, the club managed to secure second place in the championship, granting them promotion to the Fortis League (National Division, the top league in the country, renamed BGL League in March 2009 due to the 2008 financial crisis).

In May 2013, CS Fola Esch won the National Division with a historic 5–1 win against their rivals, Jeunesse Esch in the 25th match of the season. The club had a gap of 83 years since their last championship. Stefano Bensi scored 20 goals during this season.

Fola participated in the second qualifying round of the Champions League 2013–14, but lost to Dinamo Zagreb 0–5 in the first leg (at home) and 0–1 in the second leg (away). In 2015, Fola won the championship again, after finishing second in 2014. In 2016 they again finished second with an equal number of points with the champions, F91 Dudelange.

In 2016 CS Fola Esch, celebrated their 110th birthday, and also became a member of the exclusive Club of Pioneers, as the oldest football club of Luxembourg.

=== History ===
- 1906: Club founded as Football and Lawn Tennis Club Esch
- 1907: Adopts current colours of red and white stripes
- 1910: Absorbs FC Nerva, becoming Cercle sportif Fola Esch
- 1918: Wins first championship title
- 1924: Wins the Double
- 1930: Wins last championship title for the next 83 years
- 1935: Moves to current stadium, Stade Émile Mayrisch
- 1955: Wins Luxembourg Cup, a tournament Fola have not won since
- 1973: First participation in European competition (season 1973–74)
- 2013: Wins first championship in 83 years, followed by another champion title in 2015
- 2017: First qualification to the second round and to the third round in European competition

== Honours ==
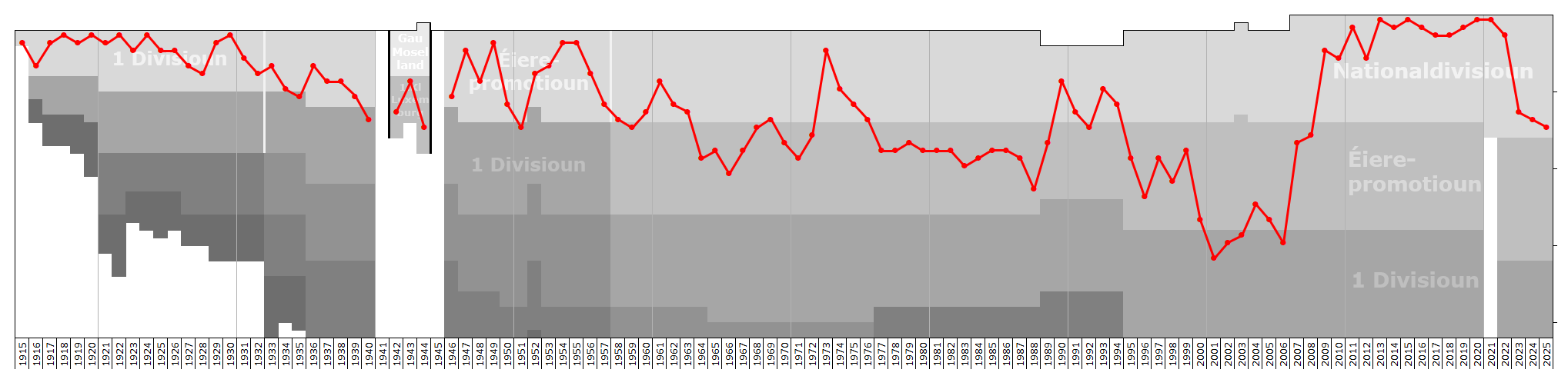
Historical league performance chart of CS Fola Esch

National Division

- Champions (8): 1917–18, 1919–20, 1921–22, 1923–24, 1929–30, 2012–13, 2014–15, 2020–21
- Runners-up (10): 1916–17, 1918–19, 1920–21, 1928–29, 1948–49, 1953–54, 1954–55, 2010–11, 2013–14, 2018–19

Luxembourg Cup

- Winners (3): 1922–23, 1923–24, 1954–55
- Runners-up (2): 1972–73, 2016–17

== European competition ==
=== Coefficient ===
As of 12 January 2025

Rank	Country	Team	Points
290	(Belarus)	Shakhtyor	3.500
291	(Albania)	Laçi	3.500
292	(Luxembourg)	Fola Esch	3.500
293	(Bulgaria)	Cherno More	3.000
294	(Serbia)	Radnički 1923	3.000

=== Playing Record ===
As of match played 26 August 2021

Competition	Pld	W	D	L	GF	GA
UEFA Champions League	7	0	2	5	3	19
UEFA Europa League	19	3	5	11	17	34
UEFA Cup Winners' Cup	2	0	0	2	1	11
UEFA Europa Conference League	7	4	0	3	9	11
Total	35	7	7	21	30	75

=== Matches ===
Season	Competition	Round	Club	Home	Away	Aggregate
1973–74	UEFA Cup Winners' Cup	1R	(Bulgaria) Beroe Stara Zagora	0–7	1–4	1–11
2011–12	UEFA Europa League	1Q	(Sweden) Elfsborg	1–1	0–4	1–5
2013–14	UEFA Champions League	2Q	(Croatia) Dinamo Zagreb	0–5	0–1	0–6
2014–15	UEFA Europa League	1Q	(Sweden) Göteborg	0–2	0–0	0–2
2015–16	UEFA Champions League	2Q	(Croatia) Dinamo Zagreb	0–3	1–1	1–4
2016–17	UEFA Europa League	1Q	(Scotland) Aberdeen	1–0	1–3	2–3
2017–18	UEFA Europa League	1Q	(Moldova) Milsami Orhei	2–1	1–1	3–2
2017–18	UEFA Europa League	2Q	(Azerbaijan) Inter Baku	4–1	0–1	4–2
2017–18	UEFA Europa League	3Q	(Sweden) Östersund	1–2	0–1	1–3
2018–19	UEFA Europa League	1Q	(Kosovo) Prishtina	0–0	0–0	0–0 (5–4p)
2018–19	UEFA Europa League	2Q	(Belgium) Genk	1–4	0–5	1–9
2019–20	UEFA Europa League	1Q	(Georgia (country)) Chikhura Sachkhere	1–2	1–2	2–4
2020–21	UEFA Champions League	1Q	(Moldova) Sheriff Tiraspol	—N/a	0–2	—N/a
2020–21	UEFA Europa League	2Q	Ararat-Armenia	—N/a	3–4 (aet)	—N/a
2021–22	UEFA Champions League	1Q	(Gibraltar) Lincoln Red Imps	2–2	0–5	2–7
2021–22	UEFA Europa Conference League	2Q	(Belarus) Shahktyor Soligorsk	1–0	2–1	3–1
2021–22	UEFA Europa Conference League	3Q	(Northern Ireland) Linfield	2–1	2–1	4–2
2021–22	UEFA Europa Conference League	PO	(Kazakhstan) Kairat	1–4	1–3	2–7
2022–23	UEFA Europa Conference League	1Q	(San Marino) Tre Fiori	0–1	1–3	1–4

== Current squad ==
As of 14 October 2026

Note: Flags indicate national team as defined under FIFA eligibility rules; some limited exceptions apply. Players may hold more than one non-FIFA nationality.

No.	Pos.	Nation	Player
1	GK	LUX	Emanuel Cabral
2	DF	POR	Luis Fernando Gomes Fermal
4	DF	FRA	Franck Momo
5	DF	FRA	Jonathan Hennetier
8	FW	ESP	Adulai Pereira Mendes
10	MF	LUX	Denis Stumpf
11	FW	FRA	Achraf Drif
12	MF	FRA	Yann Wishaupt
13	MF	FRA	Keylan Couchy
14	DF	FRA	Beldi Kusama
15	MF	LUX	Bruno Giesteira
17	MF	LUX	Yann Balance
18	FW	FRA	Gauthier Caron
19	FW	FRA	Emmanuel Francoise
20	FW	LUX	Thomas Souchard
21	MF		Redzep Kurpejovic

No.	Pos.	Nation	Player
22	DF	GLP	Dustin Bourgeois
23	MF	KOS	Diart Smajlaj
24	GK	LUX	Alex Enders
28	MF	POR	Gonçalo Martins
29	DF	FRA	Mickael Garos
30	GK	LUX	Emil Adrovic
31	DF	LUX	Lionel Amou
39	DF	LUX	Hippolyte Schaack
40	DF	LUX	Dylan De Jesus Cardoso
42	FW	FRA	Djibril Coulibaly
44	DF	GER	Juri Amidon
61	FW	FRA	Ismet Erdogan
72	FW	LUX	André Ferreira
80	MF	FRA	Gibril Boussouar
—	DF	LUX	Loan Ribeiro

== Former coaches ==
Manager	Appointed	Dismissed
(Luxembourg) Henri Bossi	1 July 1988	30 June 1989
(Luxembourg) Henri Bossi	23 September 1993	30 June 1994
(Luxembourg) Pascal Welter	19 February 2000	5 November 2002
(Belgium) Philippe Guérard	10 November 2005	25 March 2006
(Germany) Michael Lofy	1 July 2008	23 March 2009
(Luxembourg) Pascal Welter	13 April 2009	16 October 2009
(Belgium) Philippe Guérard	26 October 2009	31 October 2010
(Luxembourg) Jeff Strasser	2 November 2010	22 December 2010
(France) Cyril Serredszum	22 December 2010	30 January 2012
(Luxembourg) Jeff Strasser	1 July 2012	26 September 2017
(France) Cyril Serredszum	27 September 2017	4 February 2018
(Germany) Thomas Klasen	5 February 2018	16 August 2018
(Luxembourg) Jeff Strasser	16 August 2018	18 May 2020
(Belgium) Sébastien Grandjean	18 May 2020	unknown
(France) Arnaud Bordi	March 16, 2026	present

== Women's team ==
Fola have a women's team, competing in the Dames Ligue 2, the 2nd tier of women's football in Luxembourg. As yet, the women's team have not been as successful as their male counterparts, as they have not won any honours.
