= Racing Club Luxembourg =

Defunct association football club in Luxembourg

RC Luxembourg
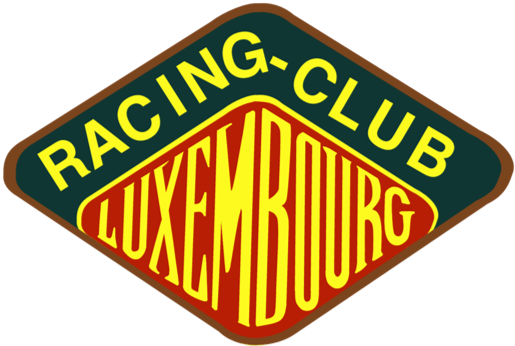
- Full name: Racing Club Luxembourg
- Founded: 3 June 1907; 119 years ago
- Dissolved: 29 May 1923; 103 years ago
Home colours	Away colours

Racing Club Luxembourg was a Luxembourgish football team which was merged with Sporting Club Luxembourg in 1923 to make CA Spora Luxembourg. It is now a part of Racing Union.

The club is well known for having been the first-ever winner of the Luxembourgish Championship in 1910, as well as the first Cup winner in 1922.

== Honours ==
- Luxembourg National Division

Winners (1): 1909–10
