= SC Luxembourg =

Defunct association football club in Luxembourg

- Full name: Sporting Club Luxembourg
- Founded: 26 May 1908
- Dissolved: 29 May 1923
Home colours	Away colours

Sporting Club Luxembourg was a football club from Luxembourg City, in southern Luxembourg.

The club was founded on 26 May 1908. In 1923, the club was merged with Racing Club Luxembourg to become CA Spora Luxembourg. It is now part of Racing Union.
