= 2012–13 Luxembourg Cup =

Tournament details
- Country: Luxembourg
- Teams: 105

Final positions
- Champions: Jeunesse Esch (13th title)
- Runners-up: Differdange 03

The 2012–13 Luxembourg Cup was the 88th season of Luxembourg's annual football cup competition. It began on 2 September 2012 with Round 1 and ended on 17 May 2013 with the Final. The winners of the competition will qualify for the first qualifying round of the 2013–14 UEFA Europa League.

F91 Dudelange, the defending champions, lost to eventual winners Jeunesse Esch in the Quarter Finals.

== Calendar ==
Round	Date	Fixtures	New entrants
Round One	2 September 2012	17	34 (18 from 2012-13 2. Division, 16 from 2012-13 3. Division)
Round Two	16 September 2012	16	15 (10 from 2012-13 2. Division, 5 from 2012-13 3. Division)
Round Three	5 and 7 October 2012	22	28 (from 2012-13 1. Division)
Round Four	27 and 28 October 2012	18	14 (from 2012-13 Division of Honour)
Round Five	16 and 18 November 2012	16	14 (from 2012–13 Luxembourg National Division)
Round Six	1 and 2 December 2012	8	–
Quarterfinals	1 May 2013	4	–
Semifinals	7 and 8 May 2013	2	–
Final	17 May 2013	1	–

== Round 1 ==
34 teams from the 2. Division (IV) and 3. Division (V) entered in this round. The games were played on 2 September 2012.

Number of teams per tier still in competition
National League (Note: National League will join the competition in the fifth round.)	Division of Honour (Note: Division of Honour teams will join the competition in the fourth round)	1. Division (Note: 1. Division teams will join the competition in the third round.)	2. Division	3. Division	Total
14 / 14	14 / 14	28 / 28	28 / 28	21 / 21	105 / 105

Team 1	Score	Team 2
FC Ehlerange (IV)	4–1	Kischpelt Wilwerwiltz (V)
Jeunesse Useldange (V)	2–1	FC Schengen (V)
AS Hosingen (IV)	1–0	Olympia Christnach/Waldbillig (V)
FC Kehlen (IV)	6–1	FC Red Black/Egalité 07 (V)
US Rambrouch (V)	3–5	Etoile Sportive Clemency (IV)
Claravallis Clervaux (V)	0–6	FC Schifflingen 95 (IV)
Racing Heiderscheid/Eschdorf (V)	0–4	Syra Mensdorf (IV)
FC Koerich/Simmern (V)	0–1	Rupensia Lusitanos Larochette (V)
FC Noertzange HF (V)	2–3	Jeunesse Schieren (IV)
Racing Troisvierges (IV)	0–3	AS Luxemburg/Porto (IV)
FC Kopstal 33 (IV)	2–0	Jeunesse Gilsdorf (V)
AS Wincrange (IV)	4–1	Les Ardoisiers Perlé (V)
Red Star Merl/Belair (V)	2–1	US Folschette (IV)
SC Ell (IV)	5–1	Sporting Beckerich (V)
Blo-Weiss Medernach (IV)	4–2	Tricolore Gasperich (IV)
Etoile Sportive Schouweiler (V)	5–0	Excelsior Grevels (IV)
Sporting Bertrange (IV)	3–1	AS Colmar-Berg (IV)

Bye: Alisontia Steinsel, FC Brouch, CS Bourscheid, Jeunesse Biwer, Les Aiglons Dalheim, Minière Lasauvage, US Moutfort/Medingen, Red Boys Aspelt, Résidence Walferdange, US Reisdorf, CS Sanem, Sporting Bettembourg, Union Mertert/Wasserbillig, Union Remich/Bous, Vinesca Ehnen.

== Round 2 ==
The seventeen winners of Round 1 and the fifteen other teams from the 2. Division (IV) and 3. Division (V) competed in this round. The games were played on 16 September 2012.

Number of teams per tier still in competition
National League (Note: National League will join the competition in the fifth round.)	Division of Honour (Note: Division of Honour teams will join the competition in the fourth round)	1. Division (Note: 1. Division teams will join the competition in the third round.)	2. Division	3. Division	Total
14 / 14	14 / 14	28 / 28	23 / 28	9 / 21	88 / 105

Team 1	Score	Team 2
US Reisdorf (V)	0–5	Etoile Sportive Schouweiler (V)
AS Hosingen (IV)	2–7	Union Remich/Bous (IV)
US Moutfort/Medingen (V)	1–2	Etoile Sportive Clemency (IV)
Les Aiglons Dalheim (V)	3–2	Syra Mensdorf (IV)
CS Sanem (IV)	3–1	AS Luxemburg/Porto (IV)
Sporting Bertrange (IV)	5–1	Blo-Weiss Medernach (IV)
Jeunesse Schieren (IV)	3–0	Red Star Merl/Belair (V)
FC Kopstal 33 (IV)	1–3	FC Schifflingen 95 (IV)
FC Brouch (IV)	7–2 (a.e.t.)	Jeunesse Useldange (V)
Alisontia Steinsel (IV)	1–2	Résidence Walferdange (IV)
Minière Lasauvage (V)	2–1	FC Kehlen (IV)
FC Ehlerange (IV)	1–2	Sporting Bettembourg (IV)
CS Bourscheid (IV)	2–0	SC Ell (IV)
Rupensia Lusitanos Larochette (V)	3–1	Vinesca Ehnen (V)
Union Mertert/Wasserbillig (IV)	4–0	Jeunesse Biwer (IV)
Red Boys Aspelt (IV)	0–1	AS Wincrange (IV)

== Round 3 ==
The sixteen winners of Round 2 competed in this round, as well as twenty-eight teams from Division 1 (III), which enter the competition in this round. The games were played on 5 and 7 October 2012.

Number of teams per tier still in competition
National League (Note: National League will join the competition in the fifth round.)	Division of Honour (Note: Division of Honour teams will join the competition in the fourth round)	1. Division	2. Division	3. Division	Total
14 / 14	14 / 14	28 / 28	12 / 28	4 / 21	72 / 105

Team 1	Score	Team 2
US Esch (III)	3–1 (a.e.t.)	AS Wincrange (IV)
Sporting Bettembourg (IV)	2–1	Berdenia Berburg (III)
FC Cebra 01 (III)	1–0	Rupensia Lusitanos Larochette (V)
FC Avenir Beggen (III)	1–2	US Feulen (III)
Daring Echternach (III)	0–3	FC Minerva Lintgen (III)
Atert Bissen (III)	4–2	SC Steinfort (III)
FC Lorentzweiler (III)	0–0 (a.e.t.) p. 4–5	Jeunesse Junglinster (III)
US Berdorf/Consdorf (III)	6–0	FC Green Boys 77 Harlange-Tarchamps (III)
Etoile Sportive Clemency (IV)	4–4 (a.e.t.) p. 3–5	Minière Lasauvage (V)
CS Sanem (IV)	3–3 (a.e.t.) p. 4–1	Union Remich/Bous (IV)
Orania Vianden (III)	1–2	Luna Obercorn (III)
FC 47 Bastendorf (III)	1–2	Marisca Mersch (III)
FC Schifflingen 95 (IV)	2–1	Etoile Sportive Schouweiler (V)
CS Bourscheid (IV)	0–4	FC Pratzerthal/Rédange (III)
Union Mertert/Wasserbillig (IV)	6–2	US Boevange/Attert (III)
Yellow Boys Weiler-la-Tour (III)	3–2 (a.e.t.)	Sporting Mertzig (III)
FC Rodange 91 (III)	4–3	Koeppchen Wormeldange (III)
The Belval Belvaux (III)	1–0 (a.e.t.)	Blo-Weiss Itzig (III)
Résidence Walferdange (IV)	2–1	Titus Lamadelaine (III)
Sporting Bertrange (IV)	6–0	Les Aiglons Dalheim (V)
Jeunesse Schieren (IV)	1–2	Blue Boys Muhlenbach (III)
FC Brouch (IV)	1–1 (a.e.t.) p. 6–5	FC Munsbach (III)

== Round 4 ==
The twenty-two winners of Round 3 competed in this round, as well as fourteen teams from the Division of Honour (II), which enter the competition in this round. The games were played on 27 and 28 October 2012.

Number of teams per tier still in competition
National League (Note: National League will join the competition in the fifth round.)	Division of Honour	1. Division	2. Division	3. Division	Total
14 / 14	14 / 14	14 / 28	7 / 28	1 / 21	50 / 105

Team 1	Score	Team 2
CS Sanem (IV)	0–4	Swift Hesperange (II)
FF Norden 02 (II)	0–6	US Berdorf/Consdorf (III)
US Feulen (III)	3–2	Sporting Bettembourg (IV)
US Esch (III)	3–0	UNA Strassen (II)
Blue Boys Muhlenbach (III)	0–2	Union Mertert/Wasserbillig (IV)
Jeunesse Junglinster (III)	0–5	US Rumelange (II)
FC Pratzerthal/Rédange (III)	0–4	CS Oberkorn (II)
Atert Bissen (III)	3–2	FC Minerva Lintgen (III)
Yellow Boys Weiler-la-Tour (III)	3–1	FC Schifflingen 95 (IV)
FC Rodange 91 (III)	4–4 (a.e.t.) p. 5–6	Erpeldange 72 (II)
FCM Young Boys Diekirch (II)	2–1	Minière Lasauvage (V)
Mondercange (II)	0–5	Sporting Bertrange (IV)
Marisca Mersch (III)	3–1	Mamer 32 (II)
Résidence Walferdange (IV)	0–1	US Sandweiler (II)
Luna Obercorn (III)	2–3	Victoria Rosport (II)
FC Brouch (IV)	1–4	US Hostert (II)
Alliance Aischdall Hobscheid/Eischen (II)	1–3	FC Cebra 01 (III)
US Mondorf-les-Bains (II)	2–1	The Belval Belvaux (III)

== Round 5 ==
The eighteen winners of Round 4 compete in this round, as well as the fourteen teams from the National Division (I), which enter the competition in this round. The games are played on 16 and 18 November 2012.

Number of teams per tier still in competition
National League	Division of Honour	1. Division	2. Division	3. Division	Total
14 / 14	9 / 14	7 / 28	2 / 28	0 / 21	32 / 105

Team 1	Score	Team 2
US Feulen (III)	0−4	Wiltz 71 (I)
Marisca Mersch (III)	0–3	Differdange 03 (I)
US Esch (III)	1–4	F91 Dudelange (I)
US Hostert (II)	3–3 (a.e.t.) p. 5–3	Pétange (I)
FC Cebra 01 (III)	0–3 (a.e.t.)	Union 05 Kayl-Tétange (I)
US Rumelange (II)	1–3	Jeunesse Esch (I)
Victoria Rosport (II)	2–2 (a.e.t.) p. 3–5	Käerjeng 97 (I)
US Berdorf/Consdorf (III)	0–7	RM Hamm Benfica (I)
Erpeldange 72 (II)	3–2 (a.e.t.)	Jeunesse Canach (I)
Swift Hesperange (II)	1–2	Fola Esch (I)
CS Oberkorn (II)	0–2	Grevenmacher (I)
Union Mertert/Wasserbillig (IV)	0–2	Etzella Ettelbruck (I)
FCM Young Boys Diekirch (II)	0–3	Progrès Niederkorn (I)
US Mondorf-les-Bains (II)	0–2	RFCU Luxembourg (I)
Sporting Bertrange (IV)	3–4 (a.e.t.)	Yellow Boys Weiler-la-Tour (III)
Atert Bissen (III)	1–0	US Sandweiler (II)

== Round 6 ==
The sixteen winners of Round 5 competed in this round. The games were played on 1 and 2 December 2012.

Number of teams per tier still in competition
National League	Division of Honour	1. Division	2. Division	3. Division	Total
12 / 14	2 / 14	2 / 28	0 / 28	0 / 21	16 / 105

Team 1	Score	Team 2
F91 Dudelange (I)	4–1 (a.e.t.)	Union 05 Kayl-Tétange (I)
Yellow Boys Weiler-la-Tour (III)	2–3	Atert Bissen (III)
Etzella Ettelbruck (I)	0–7	Differdange 03 (I)
Progrès Niederkorn (I)	2–1	RFCU Luxembourg (I)
Fola Esch (I)	1–2	Jeunesse Esch (I)
Erpeldange 72 (II)	1–4	US Hostert (II)
Käerjeng 97 (I)	1–0	RM Hamm Benfica (I)
Grevenmacher (I)	4−2 (a.e.t.)	Wiltz 71 (I)

== Quarter-finals ==
The eight winners from Round 6 competed in the quarterfinals. They were held on 1 May 2013.

Number of teams per tier still in competition
National League	Division of Honour	1. Division	2. Division	3. Division	Total
6 / 14	1 / 14	2 / 28	0 / 28	0 / 21	8 / 105

Team 1	Score	Team 2
US Hostert (II)	1−2 (a.e.t.)	Grevenmacher (I)
Differdange 03 (I)	2−0	Atert Bissen (III)
Käerjeng 97 (I)	1−0	Progrès Niederkorn (I)
Jeunesse Esch (I)	0−0 (a.e.t.) p. 3–1	F91 Dudelange (I)

== Semi-finals ==
The four winners from quarterfinals (all from the 1st tier) competed in the semifinals. They were held on 8 and 9 May 2013.

Team 1	Score	Team 2
Käerjeng 97 (I)	0–2	Jeunesse Esch (I)
Differdange 03 (I)	1–0	Grevenmacher (I)

== Final ==
17 May 2013
19:30 CEST

Jeunesse Esch	2−1	Differdange 03
Ibrahimović 17', 19'; Ramdedovic (red card) 45'; Aleixo (yellow card) 56'; Agović (yellow card) 78'; Hoffmann (yellow card) 85'; Oberweis (yellow card) 90+4'	Report in French	Franzoni 37' (pen.); Kettenmeyer (yellow card) 45'; Franzoni (yellow card) 87'

Stade Josy Barthel, Luxembourg City
Attendance: 2,353
Referee: Alain Durieux
