= 2007–08 Luxembourg Cup =

Tournament details
- Country: Luxembourg

Final positions
- Champions: CS Grevenmacher
- Runners-up: Victoria Rosport

The 2007–08 Luxembourg Cup was the 83rd season of Luxembourg's annual cup competition. It began on 28 August 2007 with Round 1 and ended on 24 May 2008 with the Final held at a neutral venue. The winners of the competition will qualify for the first qualifying round of the 2008–09 UEFA Cup. F91 Dudelange are the defending champions.

== Round 1 ==
The games were played on 28 and 29 August 2007.

Team 1	Score	Team 2
FF Norden 02	3–1	Minière Lasauvage
FC Kopstal 33	1−1 (a.e.t.); 4−2 (pen)	Olympia Christnach/Waldbillig
Excelsior Grevels	2–3	FC Noertzange HF
US Feulen	5–2	ES Schouweiler
Claravallis Clervaux	2–5	AS Luxembourg
Alisontia Steinsel	11–0	Kischpelt Wilwerwiltz
AS Wincrange	7–1	US Rambrouch
FC Red Black/Egalité 07	4–2	Les Ardoisiers Perlé
Vinesca Ehnen	5–3	Racing Heiderscheid/Eschdorf
Les Amis de la Moselle Remerschen	4–1	Titus Lamadelaine
CS Bourscheid	3–2	US Reisdorf
Red Boys Aspelt	2–4	FC Schifflange 95
US Bous	5–2	Jeunesse Sportive Koerich
US Berdorf/Consdorf	4–2	Jeunesse Useldange
FC Pratzerthal/Redange	6–0	Les Aiglons Dalheim
Luna Oberkorn	1–2	Red Star Merl/Belair
US Folschette	0–6	FC Brouch
SC Ell	0–4	Blo-Weiss Medernach
AS Remich	2–0	Résidence Walferdange
Syra Mensdorf	2–3	Rupensia Lusitanos Larochette

== Round 2 ==
The games were played on 16 September 2007.

Team 1	Score	Team 2
Alisontia Steinsel	1–2	US Moutfort/Medingen
Tricolore Gasperich	0–1	FC Schifflange 95
Sporting Beckerich	0–5	Les Amis de la Moselle Remerschen
The Belval Belvaux	2–0	AS Remich
FC Kopstal 33	3–6	FC Pratzerthal/Redange
CS Sanem	2–0	US Berdorf/Consdorf
Iska Boys Simmern	2−2 (a.e.t.); 8−7 (pen)	FC Brouch
US Feulen	2−2 (a.e.t.); 5−7 (pen)	Blo-Weiss Medernach
US Bous	2−2 (a.e.t.); 10−9 (pen)	Rupensia Lusitanos Larochette
AS Luxembourg	0–1	Orania Vianden
FC Red Black/Egalité 07	1−1 (a.e.t.); 5−3 (pen)	AS Wincrange
CS Bourscheid	1–6	Jeunesse Biwer
FC Noertzange HF	0–2	Red Star Merl/Belair
Racing Troisvierges	4–5	FF Norden 02
Berdenia Berbourg	2–0	Jeunesse Junglinster
Sporting Bertrange	6–0	Vinesca Ehnen

== Round 3 ==
The games were played on 28 October 2007.

Team 1	Score	Team 2
FC Flaxweiler/Beyren	5–1	The Belval Belvaux
Blo-Weiss Medernach	0–2	US Esch
Berdenia Berbourg	0–3	US Hostert
Marisca Mersch	0–2	UNA Strassen
FC Lorentzweiler	2–1	AS Colmar-Berg
US Mondorf-les-Bains	2−3 (a.e.t.)	US Moutfort/Medingen
Jeunesse Biwer	1−1 (a.e.t.); 5−6 (pen)	FC Ehlerange
Sporting Bertrange	3–2	Blo-Weiss Itzig
US Bous	2–1	AS Hosingen
SC Bettembourg	2–0	FF Norden 02
FC Schifflange 95	0–3	Union 05 Kayl/Tétange
Iska Boys Simmern	2–0	Red Star Merl/Belair
FC Pratzerthal/Redange	0–8	US Sandweiler
Koeppchen Wormeldange	4–0	FC Munsbach
CS Sanem	0–3	Jeunesse Schieren
Alliance Aischdall Hobscheid/Eischen	3–1	FC Red Black/Egalité 07
Orania Vianden	1–2	ES Clemency
FC 47 Bastendorf	6−4 (a.e.t.)	Jeunesse Gilsdorf
FC Rodange 91	3–1	Les Amis de la Moselle Remerschen
Daring Echternach	3–0	GB Harlange/Tarchamps
US Boevange/Attert	0–1	Young Boys Diekirch
FC Kehlen	1–2	Yellow Boys Weiler

== Round 4 ==
The games were played on 24 February 2008.

Team 1	Score	Team 2
US Bous	1–0	Daring Echternach
Atert Bissen	1–3	CS Oberkorn
ES Clemency	1–3	Sporting Bertrange
Jeunesse Canach	7–1	FC Ehlerange
FC Lorentzweiler	3–0	FC Rodange 91
Iska Boys Simmern	0–4	FC 47 Bastendorf
US Moutfort/Medingen	0–3	Fola Esch
US Hostert	4−2 (a.e.t.)	US Esch
FC Cebra 01	3−3 (a.e.t.); 5−6 (pen)	Blue-Boys Muhlenbach
US Sandweiler	3–1	UNA Strassen
Minerva Lintgen	0–3	US Rumelange
Union 05 Kayl/Tétange	0–1	SC Steinfort
FC Flaxweiler/Beyren	0–4	FC Erpeldange 72
Young Boys Diekirch	2–0	Alliance Aischdall Hobscheid/Eischen
Sporting Mertzig	3–0	SC Bettembourg
Koeppchen Wormeldange	1–4	Mondercange
Jeunesse Schieren	2–3	FC Mamer 32
Union Mertert-Wasserbillig	2–0	Yellow Boys Weiler

== Round 5 ==
The games were played on 5 March 2008.

Team 1	Score	Team 2
Sporting Mertzig	2–0	FC Wiltz 71
Jeunesse Canach	2–3	Jeunesse Esch
SC Steinfort	2–0	Avenir Beggen
FC Erpeldange 72	1−1 (a.e.t.); 4−6 (pen)	RM Hamm Benfica
Mondercange	0–5	CS Pétange
Fola Esch	1−1 (a.e.t.); 6−5 (pen)	UN Käerjéng 97
FC Lorentzweiler	0–4	Racing FC
US Rumelange	2–4	F91 Dudelange
CS Oberkorn	0–5	Etzella Ettelbruck
US Hostert	1–3	Victoria Rosport
Young Boys Diekirch	1–3	CS Grevenmacher
Union Mertert-Wasserbillig	0−0 (a.e.t.); 6−5 (pen)	Progrès Niedercorn
Sporting Bertrange	2–1	FC Differdange 03
Blue-Boys Muhlenbach	3–2	Swift Hesperange
FC Mamer 32	6–1	FC 47 Bastendorf
US Bous	0–4	US Sandweiler

== Round 6 ==
The games were played on 22 March 2008.

Team 1	Score	Team 2
Sporting Bertrange	0–6	CS Grevenmacher
SC Steinfort	1−3 (a.e.t.)	Etzella Ettelbruck
Fola Esch	0–4	Victoria Rosport
FC Mamer 32	0–4	RM Hamm Benfica
Blue-Boys Muhlenbach	1−1 (a.e.t.); 6−7 (pen)	Sporting Mertzig
Jeunesse Esch	5–1	Racing FC
US Sandweiler	0–8	F91 Dudelange
Union Mertert-Wasserbillig	1−1 (a.e.t.); 2−4 (pen)	CS Pétange

== Quarter-finals ==
The games were played on 10 May 2008.

Team 1	Score	Team 2
RM Hamm Benfica	6–0	Etzella Ettelbruck
Sporting Mertzig	0–4	Victoria Rosport
F91 Dudelange	0–1	CS Pétange
CS Grevenmacher	3–0	Jeunesse Esch

== Semi-finals ==
The games were played on 10 May 2008.

Team 1	Score	Team 2
RM Hamm Benfica	0–1	CS Grevenmacher
Victoria Rosport	1−1 (a.e.t.); 6−5 (pen)	CS Pétange

== Final ==
24 May 2008
17:00 CEST

CS Grevenmacher	4–1	Victoria Rosport
Munoz 11'; Huss 24'; Di Domenico 69'; Thimmesch 72'		Wagner 81'

Stade Josy Barthel, Luxembourg City
Attendance: 3,835
Referee: Mario Pinto da Costa
