= Lehit Zeghdane =

French footballer (born 1977)

Personal information
- Date of birth: 3 October 1977 (age 49)
- Place of birth: Sedan, France
- Position: Defender

Senior career*
Years	Team	Apps	(Gls)
2000	Sedan	0	(0)
2000–2001	Darlington	3	(0)
2001–2015	F91 Dudelange	127	(17)
- * Club domestic league appearances and goals

Lehit Zeghdane (born 3 October 1977) is a French former professional footballer who played as a defender. He has also played in The Football League for Darlington before moving to Luxembourgish club F91 Dudelange.

== Career statistics ==
As of 19 September 2016

Appearances and goals by club, season and competition
Club	Season	League			Cup (Note: Includes Luxembourg Cup.)		Continental		Total	
Club	Season	Division	Apps	Goals	Apps	Goals	Apps	Goals	Apps	Goals
F91 Dudelange	2001–02	Luxembourg National Division	0	0	0	0	2 (Note: Appearance(s) in UEFA Champions League)	0	2	0
F91 Dudelange	2002–03	Luxembourg National Division	0	0	0	0	—		0	0
F91 Dudelange	2003–04	Luxembourg National Division	19	1	0	0	2 (Note: Appearance(s) in UEFA Europa League)	0	21	1
F91 Dudelange	2004–05	Luxembourg National Division	6	1	0	0	—		6	1
F91 Dudelange	2005–06	Luxembourg National Division	13	1	3	0	1	0	17	1
F91 Dudelange	2006–07	Luxembourg National Division	14	4	2	0	2	0	18	4
F91 Dudelange	2007–08	Luxembourg National Division	15	2	1	0	1	0	17	2
F91 Dudelange	2008–09	Luxembourg National Division	7	0	3	0	—		10	0
F91 Dudelange	2009–10	Luxembourg National Division	16	0	1	0	2	0	19	0
F91 Dudelange	2010–11	Luxembourg National Division	1	0	0	0	—		1	0
F91 Dudelange	2011–12	Luxembourg National Division	9	0	2	0	—		11	0
F91 Dudelange	2012–13	Luxembourg National Division	14	0	0	0	5 (Note: four appearances in UEFA Champions League, one appearance in UEFA Europa League)	0	19	0
F91 Dudelange	2013–14	Luxembourg National Division	0	0	1	0	—		1	0
F91 Dudelange	2014–15	Luxembourg National Division	1	0	0	0	—		1	0
F91 Dudelange	Total		117	9	13	0	15	0	145	9
Career total			117	9	13	0	15	0	145	9

== Honours ==
F91 Dudelange

- Luxembourg National Division (9): 2001–02, 2004–05, 2005–06, 2006–07, 2007–08, 2008–09, 2010–11, 2011–12, 2013–14
- Luxembourg Cup: 2004, 2006, 2007, 2009, 2012
