= List of SV Eintracht Trier 05 players =

Below is a list of notable footballers who have played for SV Eintracht Trier 05

== Famous players ==
Name	Years	Nationality
Gunter Herrmann	1947–1958	German
Gunter Fohr	1948–1958	German
Rainer Gawell	1953–1954 & 1955–1960	German
Paul Pidancet	1958–1970	German
Dieter Brozulat	1963–1965	German
Elmar Frank	1966–1973	German
Lothar Leiendecker	1971–1987	German
Erwin Zimmer	1972–1982	German
Svend Andresen	1976–1978	Denmark
Helmut Bergfelder	1976–1981	German
Reiner Brinsa	1976–1988	German
Heinz Histling	1976–1980	German
Werner Vollack	1976–1980	German
Gerd Fink	1977–1981	German
Franz Michelberger	1977–1981	German
Dieter Luders	1978–1981	German
Alfred Wahlen	1979–1981	German
Alfons Joachim	1979–1990	German
Harald Aumeier	1980–1981	German
Ludwig Dahler	1980–1990	German
Harald Kohr	1981–1986	German
Achim Wilbois	1982–1986	German
Elmar Klodt	1983–1990	German
Jurgen Roth-Lebenstedt	1984–1993	German
Wolfram Schanda	1986–1990	German
Rudi Thommes	1986–2004	German
Runald Ossen	1990–1992	German
Anton Weissenbacher	1993–2000	Romania
Markus Osthoff	1991–1994	German
Daniel Ischdonat	1997–2006	German
Najeh Braham	2001–2004 & 2005–2006	Tunisia
Milorad Pekovic	2002–2005	Montenegro

== Notable players ==
(Albania)

- Liridon Binakaj
- Shergo Biran
- Dibran Thaqi

(Australia)

- Peter Buljan
- David Zdrilic

(Azerbaijan)

- Ilham Mammadov

(Bosnia and Herzegovina)

- Miodrag Latinović
- Faris Efendić
- Adnan Kevrić
- Nihad Mujakić

(Brazil)

- Antonio da Silva

(Ivory Coast)

- Jaja Diakite

(Republic of the Congo)

- Rodalec Souza

(Colombia)

- Brahaman Sinisterra

(Croatia)

- Igor Budisa
- Dario Krešić
- Antun Labak
- Zoran Mamić
- Marijo Maric
- Alen Milak
- Pero Miletic
- Denis Novacic
- Vlado Papic

(Eritrea)

- Sammy Habte

(France)

- Francis Laurent
- Philippe Stelletta
- Pierre Valerius

(Georgia (country))

- David Siradze

(Germany)

- Florian Bauer
- Roland Benschneider
- Reinhold Breu
- Frank Buschmann
- Jakob Dallevedove
- Dirk de Wit
- Matthias Dworschak
- Dirk Fengler
- David Fuhl
- Fabio Fuhs
- Dennis Giese
- Matthias Hamann
- Christian Hassa
- Werner Heinzen
- Mario Herres
- Steffen Herzberger
- Kai Hillmann
- Daniel Ischdonat
- Axel Keller
- Marcus Koster
- Michael Krempchen
- Maurice Kress
- Peter Klaus
- Ronny Kockel
- Markus Lösch
- Stefan Malchow
- Dominik Müller
- Runald Ossen
- Markus Osthoff
- Nico Patschinski
- Sebastian Pelzer
- Sebastian Radtke
- Jens Robben
- Andreas Saur
- Edgar Schmitt
- Stephan Straub
- Frank Thieltges
- Rudi Thömmes
- Marco Toppmöller
- Niki Wagner
- Michael Weuffen
- Sebastian Ting
- Daniel Winkler

(Ghana)

- Lawrence Adjei
- Joseph Annor Aziz
- Edwin Bediako
- Kwaku Kyere

(Guinea-Bissau)

- Bruno Gomis

(Hungary)

- Vitus Nagorny

(Iran)

- Shpend Hayredini
- Ali Parhizi

(Italy)

- Fabio Cornely
- Angelo Donato
- Luca Greco
- Gustav Policella
- Frank Prunella
- Philipp Regneri

(Japan)

- Nobutaka Suzuki

(Kosovo)

- Mehmet Dragusha
- Emin Ismaili

(Lebanon)

- Achmed Boussi

(Liberia)

- Josephus Yenay

(Luxembourg)

- Gilles Kettels
- Robert Langers
- Tom Schnell

(Mali)

- Moussa Touré

(North Macedonia)

- Erkan Amedovski

(Nigeria)

- Angus Ikeji
- Amodou Abdullei

(Poland)

- Marek Czakon
- Benjamin Gorka
- Claus Grzeskowiak
- Thomas Kempny
- Grzegorz Wiezik

(Portugal)

- Victor Lopes

(Romania)

- Alexandru Balota
- Christian Barbian
- Catalin Racanel

(Serbia)

- Petar Divić
- Milan Drageljevic
- Ermin Melunović
- Vitomir Milosevic

(Tunisia)

- Zouhair Bouadoud
- Najeh Braham
- Samir Louadj

(Turkey)

- Mevlüt Yildirim
- Hasan Vural

(Ukraine)

- Artur Poloshenko

(United States)

- Charlie Rugg
