= 2011–12 Luxembourg Cup =

Tournament details
- Country: Luxembourg

Final positions
- Champions: F91 Dudelange
- Runners-up: Jeunesse Esch

The 2011–12 Luxembourg Cup was the 87th season of Luxembourg's annual cup competition. It began on 28 August 2011 with Round 1 and ended on 26 May 2012 with the Final held at Stade Josy Barthel in Luxembourg City. The winners of the competition qualified for the first qualifying round of the 2012–13 UEFA Europa League. FC Differdange 03 are the defending champions, having won their second cup title last season.

== Calendar ==
| Round | Date | Fixtures | New entrants |
|---|---|---|---|
| Round One | 28 August 2011 | 18 | 36 |
| Round Two | 4 September 2011 | 16 | 14 |
| Round Three | 9 October 2011 | 22 | 28 |
| Round Four | 30 October 2011 | 18 | 14 |
| Round Five | 27 November 2011 | 16 | 14 |
| Round Six | 11 April 2012 | 8 | – |
| Quarterfinals | 2 May 2012 | 4 | – |
| Semifinals | 19 and 20 May 2012 | 2 | – |
| Final | 26 May 2012 | 1 | – |

== Round 1 ==
Fifty teams from Division 2 (IV) and Division 3 (V) entered in this round. Thirty-six of them competed in matches, while the other fourteen teams were awarded a bye to the next round. The games were played on 28 August 2011.

| Team 1 | Score | Team 2 |
|---|---|---|
| SC Ell | 7–2 (a.e.t.) | AS Wincrange |
| FC 47 Bastendorf | 4–1 | Red Boys Aspelt |
| ES Schouweiler | 1–1 (a.e.t.); 5−6 (pen) | Titus Lamadelaine |
| FC Noertzange HF | 1–4 | FC Rodange 91 |
| FC Red Black/Egalité 07 | 2–1 | Les Amis de la Moselle Remerschen |
| Blo-Weiss Itzig | 10–0 | Claravallis Clervaux |
| US Moutfort/Medingen | 2–3 | US Boevange/Attert |
| AS Hosingen | 7–0 | Sporting Beckerich |
| Sporting Bettemburg | 1–4 | Luna Obercorn |
| US Rambrouch | 1–6 | FC Kopstal 33 |
| Excelsior Grevels | 0–5 | AS Luxemburg/Porto |
| Racing Heiderscheid/Eschdorf | 2–7 | Kischpelt Wilwerwiltz |
| Vinesca Ehnen | 0–5 | CS Bourscheid |
| Jeunesse Biwer | 2–0 | Les Aiglons Dalheim |
| CS Sanem | 3–0 | FC Ehlerange |
| Olympia Christmach/Waldbilling | 6–4 | US Folschette |
| Sporting Bertrange | 5–0 | Jeunesse Useldange |
| Tricolore Gasperich | 1–3 | Syra Mensdorf |

Bye: Alisontia Steinsel, US Berdorf/Consdorf, Blo-Weiss Medernach, FC Brouch, AS Colmar-Berg, Jeunesse Gilsdorf, Jeunesse Sportive Koerich, Les Ardoisiers Perlé, Minière Lasauvage, Racing Troisvierges, Red Star Merl/Belair, US Reisdorf, Rupensia Lusitanos Larochette, Union Remich/Bous

== Round 2 ==
The eighteen winners of Round 1 and the fourteen teams that received a bye competed in this round. The games were played on 4 September 2011.

| Team 1 | Score | Team 2 |
|---|---|---|
| Red Star Merl/Belair | 0–7 | Blo-Weiss Itzig |
| Sporting Bertrange | 1–0 | Jeunesse Sportive Koerich |
| FC Kopstal 33 | 0–1 | CS Sanem |
| US Reisdorf | 0–3 | Les Ardoisiers Perlé |
| AS Hosingen | 1–2 (a.e.t.) | Jeunesse Biwer |
| Union Remich/Bous | 6–4 (a.e.t.) | US Boevange/Attert |
| AS Colmar-Berg | 1–3 | AS Luxemburg/Porto |
| FC Rodange 91 | 4–1 | Blo-Weiss Medernach |
| Kischpelt Wilwerwiltz | 0–2 | Racing Troisvierges |
| Luna Obercorn | 3–2 | Rupensia Lusitanos Larochette |
| Jeunesse Gilsdorf | 3–0 | Olympia Christmach/Waldbilling |
| Syra Mensdorf | 1–5 (a.e.t.) | Titus Lamadelaine |
| US Berdorf/Consdorf | 2–1 | FC Red Black/Egalité 07 |
| FC 47 Bastendorf | 2–0 (a.e.t.) | FC Brouch |
| Alisontia Steinsel | 0–3 | SC Ell |
| CS Bourscheid | 1–2 | Minière Lasauvage |

== Round 3 ==
The sixteen winners of Round 2 competed in this round, as well as twenty-eight teams from Division 1 (III), which enter the competition in this round. The games were played on 7, 8 and 9 October 2011.

| Team 1 | Score | Team 2 |
|---|---|---|
| FC Lorentzweiler | 0–4 | ES Clemency |
| Sporting Bertrange | 5–3 | Union Remich/Bous |
| Luna Obercorn | 2–0 | FC Pratzerthal/Rédange |
| Jeunesse Junglinster | 2–0 | Orania Vianden |
| Marisca Mersch | 3–0 | Jeunesse Gilsdorf |
| Union Mertert/Wasserbillig | 5–4 (a.e.t.) | Sporting Mertzig |
| CS Sanem | 2–1 | Résidence Walferdange |
| FC Flaxweiler/Beyren Udinesina | 1–0 | FC Green Boys 77 Harlange-Tarchamps |
| Blo-Weiss Itzig | 3–1 | FC 47 Bastendorf |
| US Sandweiler | 2–0 | US Esch |
| Les Ardoisiers Perlé | 2–6 | Daring Echternach |
| FC Cebra 01 | 1–0 | SC Steinfort |
| FC Munsbach | 4–0 | US Berdorf/Consdorf |
| FC Avenir Beggen | 1–2 | Atert Bissen |
| Yellow Boys Weiler-la-Tour | 1–0 | Jeunesse Schieren |
| Racing Troisvierges | 3–0 (w/o) | Minière Lasauvage |
| FC Kehlen | 2–3 | SC Ell |
| FC Rodange 91 | 2–2 (a.e.t.); 6−3 (pen) | Titus Lamadelaine |
| Berdenia Berburg | 2–1 | AS Luxemburg/Porto |
| Jeunesse Biwer | 1–2 | FC Minerva Lintgen |
| Alliance Aischdall Hobscheid/Eischen | 3–0 | US Feulen |
| The Belval Belvaux | 3–2 | FC Schifflingen 95 |

== Round 4 ==
The twenty-two winners of Round 3 competed in this round, as well as fourteen teams from the Division of Honour (II), which enter the competition in this round. The games were played on 28, 29 and 30 October and 9 November 2011.

| Team 1 | Score | Team 2 |
|---|---|---|
| ES Clemency | 2–0 | SC Ell |
| Jeunesse Canach | 2−2 (a.e.t.); 4−5 (pen) | UNA Strassen |
| US Mondorf-les-Bains | 2–1 | Atert Bissen |
| Erpeldange 72 | 2−2 (a.e.t.); 4−5 (pen) | Victoria Rosport |
| Mondercange | 0–1 | Jeunesse Junglinster |
| Sporting Bertrange | 1–0 | Berdenia Berburg |
| Mamer 32 | 2–1 | Marisca Mersch |
| Alliance Aischdall Hobscheid/Eischen | 2–4 (a.e.t.) | The Belval Belvaux |
| Racing Troisvierges | 1–4 | Union Mertert/Wasserbillig |
| FF Norden 02 | 2–3 | Luna Obercorn |
| Yellow Boys Weiler-la-Tour | 2–4 | Wiltz 71 |
| Blo-Weiss Itzig | 2–3 | CS Oberkorn |
| FC Munsbach | 1–2 | FCM Young Boys Diekirch |
| Koeppchen Wormeldange | 2−2 (a.e.t.); 2−4 (pen) | FC Rodange 91 |
| Minerva Lintgen | 5–1 | CS Sanem |
| Daring Echternach | 0–3 | Etzella Ettelbruck |
| FC Flaxweiler/Beyren Udinesina | 4–2 | FC Cebra 01 |
| CS Muhlenbach Lusitanos | 1–3 | US Sandweiler |

== Round 5 ==
The eighteen winners of Round 4 competed in this round, as well as the fourteen teams from the National Division, which enter the competition in this round. The games were played on the 26th and 27 November 2011.

| Team 1 | Score | Team 2 |
|---|---|---|
| US Mondorf-les-Bains | 2–1 | US Rumelange |
| UNA Strassen | 1–5 | CS Pétange |
| Union Mertert/Wasserbillig | 1–3 | Union 05 Kayl-Tétange |
| ES Clemency | 2–1 | Progrès Niedercorn |
| Mamer 32 | 1–2 | UN Käerjéng 97 |
| US Sandweiler | 1–4 | Jeunesse Esch |
| Jeunesse Junglinster | 2–4 | US Hostert |
| FC Flaxweiler/Beyren Udinesina | 3–4 | Swift Hesperange |
| Minerva Lintgen | 1–4 | F91 Dudelange |
| FCM Young Boys Diekirch | 0–2 | CS Fola Esch |
| Sporting Bertrange | 1–2 | RM Hamm Benfica |
| Victoria Rosport | 0–6 | Differdange 03 |
| FC Rodange 91 | 0–8 | Racing FC Union Luxembourg |
| Wiltz 71 | 1–4 | CS Grevenmacher |
| CS Oberkorn | 1–0 | Luna Obercorn |
| Etzella Ettelbruck | 2–0 | The Belval Belvaux |

== Round 6 ==
The sixteen winners of Round 5 competed in this round. The games were played on 11 April 2012.

| Team 1 | Score | Team 2 |
|---|---|---|
| US Mondorf-les-Bains | 3−3 (a.e.t.); 3−2 (pen) | CS Pétange |
| UN Käerjéng 97 | 0−2 | Union 05 Kayl-Tétange |
| Racing FC Union Luxembourg | 2−3 | CS Grevenmacher |
| F91 Dudelange | 5−1 | RM Hamm Benfica |
| Etzella Ettelbruck | 2−1 | Swift Hesperange |
| CS Oberkorn | 0−2 | Differdange 03 |
| ES Clemency | 0−3 | CS Fola Esch |
| Jeunesse Esch | 4−0 | US Hostert |

== Quarter-finals ==
The eight winners from Round 6 competed in the quarterfinals. They were held on 1 and 2 May 2012.

| Team 1 | Score | Team 2 |
|---|---|---|
| F91 Dudelange | 4–2 | Union 05 Kayl-Tétange |
| Jeunesse Esch | 2–2 (a.e.t.); 5–2 (pen) | Etzella Ettelbruck |
| CS Fola Esch | 3–0 | US Mondorf-les-Bains |
| Differdange 03 | 2–1 | CS Grevenmacher |

== Semi-finals ==
The four quarterfinal winners competed in the semifinals. They were held on 18 and 20 May 2012.

| Team 1 | Score | Team 2 |
|---|---|---|
| Differdange 03 | 1–2 | Jeunesse Esch |
| F91 Dudelange | 1–1 (a.e.t.); 5–4 (pen) | CS Fola Esch |

== Final ==
26 May 2012
15:00 CEST

| Jeunesse Esch | 2–4 (a.e.t.) | F91 Dudelange |
|---|---|---|
| Gomez 3'; Benajiba 65' | | Joachim 32', 105'; Benzouien 50'; Abdullei 120' |

Stade Josy Barthel, Luxembourg City
Attendance: 2,847
Referee: Christian Holtgen
