= Tomasz Gruszczyński =

Polish footballer (born 1980)

Personal information
- Full name: Tomasz Piotr Gruszczyński
- Date of birth: 4 December 1980 (age 45)
- Place of birth: Wałbrzych, Poland
- Height: 1.93 m (6 ft 4 in)
- Position: Forward

Youth career
- Metz
- Amnéville
- Hagondange
- Malencourt

Senior career*
Years	Team	Apps	(Gls)
1999–2002	Metz B	16	(2)
2002–2011	F91 Dudelange	191	(116)
2012	Amnéville	13	(4)
2012–2013	Progrès Niederkorn	17	(4)
2013–2014	Thionville Lusitanos		
- * Club domestic league appearances and goals

Tomasz Piotr Gruszczyński (born 4 December 1980) is a Polish former professional footballer who played as a forward.

== Early life ==
Gruszczyński moved to France at the age of eleven. He acquired French nationality on 4 November 1997, through the collective effect of his father's naturalization. As a youth player, Gruszczyński joined the youth academy of French side Metz, where he played alongside future Togo international Emmanuel Adebayor.

== Career ==
In 2002, Gruszczyński signed for Luxembourgish side F91 Dudelange, where he was regarded as one of the club's most important players, leading them to seven league titles and five national cup wins. He is their all-time top scorer with 129 goals.

In 2012, he signed for Luxembourgish side Progrès Niederkorn.

== Post-playing career ==
After retiring from professional football, Gruszczyński continued expanding his window installation business, which he launched while he was still an active player.

== Personal life ==
Gruszczyński is the father of footballer Kelya Gruszczynski. He is the son of Polish footballer Jan Gruszczyński.

== Honours ==
Dudelange

- Luxembourg National Division: 2004–05, 2005–06, 2006–07, 2007–08, 2008–09, 2010–11, 2011–12
- Luxembourg Cup: 2003–04, 2005–06, 2006–07, 2008–09, 2011–12
