= 2008–09 Luxembourg Cup =

Tournament details
- Country: Luxembourg

Final positions
- Champions: F91 Dudelange
- Runners-up: UN Käerjéng 97

The 2008–09 Luxembourg Cup was the 84th season of Luxembourg's annual cup competition. It began on 3 September 2008 with Round 1 and ended on 30 May 2009 with the Final held at a neutral venue. The winners of the competition will qualify for the second qualifying round of the 2009–10 UEFA Europa League. CS Grevenmacher are the defending champions.

== Round 1 ==
Fifty-two teams from Division 2 (IV) and Division 3 (V) entered in this round. Forty of them competed in matches, with the other twelve teams were awarded a bye. The games were played on 3 September 2008.

Team 1	Score	Team 2
Berdenia Berbourg	3–2	Blo-Weiss Itzig
Red Boys Aspelt	1–0	Iska Boys Simmern
ES Clemency	0–2	Belval Belvaux
US Folschette	0–10	Amis de la Moselle Remerschen
ES Schouweiler	2–1	Jeunesse Biwer
Racing Troisvierges	0–1 (a.e.t.)	US Berdorf/Consdorf
Alisontia Steinsel	1–1 (a.e.t.); 4−3 (pen)	Jeunesse Junglinster
Kiischpelt Wilwerwiltz	0–5	AS Hosingen
AS Remich	11–0	Jeunesse Useldange
FC Pratzerthal/Rédange	1–0	FC Red Black/Egalité Pfaffenthal/Weimerskirch
FC Dalheim	1–2	FC Noertzange
Jeunesse Koerich	4–3 (a.e.t.)	Red Star Merl
Racing Heiderscheid	0–6	FF Norden 02
Rupensia Larochette	5–3 (a.e.t.)	Minière Lasauvage
Blo Weiss Medernach	3–5	Titus Lamadelaine
US Feulen	0–1	Tricolore Gasperich
FC Schifflange	4–2	FC Perlé
Luna Oberkorn	3–0	US Rambrouch
CS Sanem	w/o	Sporting Beckerich
Olympia Christnach	0–3	Claravallis Clervaux

Bye: US Boevange, CS Bourscheid, FC Brouch, Vinesca Ehnen, Excelsior Grevels, FC Kopstal, AS Luxembourg-Porto, Marisca Mersch, US Moutfort, US Reisdorf, Résidence Walferdange, Yellow Boys Weiler

== Round 2 ==
The winners of Round 1 competed in this round. The games were played on 28 September 2008.

Team 1	Score	Team 2
Marisca Mersch	1–2	CS Sanem
Résidence Walferdange	2–0	FF Norden 02
US Berdorf/Consdorf	0–4	Luna Oberkorn
Vinesca Ehnen	0–1	AS Luxembourg-Porto
Titus Lamadelaine	4–1	US Boevange
Jeunesse Koerich	1–0	Tricolore Gasperich
ES Schouweiler	3–1	Amis de la Moselle Remerschen
CS Bourscheid	6–5 (a.e.t.)	Claravallis Clervaux
AS Hosingen	5–0	Rupensia Larochette
Red Boys Aspelt	4–0	Alisontia Steinsel
FC Noertzange	1–2	Yellow Boys Weiler
AS Remich	2–0	FC Schifflange
Excelsior Grevels	0–3	FC Brouch
Berdenia Berbourg	5–0	FC Kopstal
US Reisdorf	2–4	FC Pratzerthal/Rédange
US Moutfort	1–4	Belval Belvaux

== Round 3 ==
The winners of Round 2 competed in this round, as well as twenty-eight teams from Division 1 (III), which entered the competition in this round. The games were played on 2 November 2008.

Team 1	Score	Team 2
FC Munsbach	5–3 (a.e.t.)	US Esch
Berdenia Berbourg	2–2 (a.e.t.); 2−4 (pen)	FC Mamer 32
CS Obercorn	4–0	Luna Oberkorn
FC Brouch	2–0	US Bous
Résidence Walferdange	0–3	Alliance Aischdall Hobscheid/Eischen
Belval Belvaux	2–1	CS Sanem
Orania Vianden	1–6	Jeunesse Schieren
Sporting Bertrange	2–1	Jeunesse Gilsdorf
Green Boys Harlange/Tarchamps	3–0	AS Hosingen
Syra Mensdorf	0–1	Yellow Boys Weiler
FC Cebra 01	6–0	FC Kehlen
FC Lorentzweiler	3–4 (a.e.t.)	Union 05 Kayl/Tétange
AS Wincrange	1–2 (a.e.t.)	US Mondorf-les-Bains
FC Pratzerthal/Rédange	3–0	Red Boys Aspelt
FC Ehlerange	0–3	AS Luxembourg-Porto
Jeunesse Koerich	1–8	Daring Echternach
AS Remich	3–2	Blue-Boys Muhlenbach
FC Rodange 91	5–0	SC Ell
FC 47 Bastendorf	1–4	Sporting Bettemburg
Young Boys Diekirch	2–1 (a.e.t.)	Una Strassen
ES Schouweiler	0–3	Titus Lamadelaine
CS Bourscheid	1–2	US Sandweiler

== Round 4 ==
Twenty-two winners of Round 3 competed in this round, as well as fourteen teams from the Division of Honour (II), which entered the competition in this round. The games were played on 7 December 2008.

Team 1	Score	Team 2
FC Minerva Lintgen	1–1 (a.e.t.); 4−3 (pen)	FC Koeppchen Wuermer
FC Pratzerthal/Rédange	4–1	Yellow Boys Weiler
US Mondorf-les-Bains	1–0	Alliance Aischdall Hobscheid/Eischen
Uewerkuer	0–1	Sporting Bettemburg
Daring Echternach	3–3 (a.e.t.); 6−5 (pen)	FC Munsbach
Victoria Rosport	3–1	Erpeldange 72
AS Remich	1–0 (a.e.t.)	US Sandweiler
FC Brouch	0–4	Flaxweiler/Beyren Udinesina 01
FC Mamer 32	2–0	Colmar-Bierg
Union 05 Kayl/Tétange	0–3	Union Mertert-Wasserbillig
Young Boys Diekirch	8–1	Belval Belvaux
Canach Jeunesse	3–4	Mondercange
Sporting Mertzig	0–4	Jeunesse Schieren
CS Pétange	1–2 (a.e.t.)	CS Obercorn
FC Rodange 91	1–6	Attert Bissen
AS Luxembourg-Porto	0–4	FC Cebra 01
Titus Lamadelaine	2–0	Sporting Bertrange
Green Boys Harlange/Tarchamps	3–1	FC Wiltz 71

== Round 5 ==
Eighteen winners of Round 4 competed in this round, as well as fourteen teams from the National Division, which entered the competition in this round. The games were played on 21 February 2009.

Team 1	Score	Team 2
CS Obercorn	1–3	Etzella Ettelbruck
Union Mertert-Wasserbillig	0–2	CS Grevenmacher
Titus Lamadelaine	0–3	Avenir Beggen
Sporting Bettemburg	0–1	SC Steinfort
Jeunesse Schieren	2–4	UN Käerjéng 97
AS Remich	0–1 (a.e.t.)	RM Hamm Benfica
Green Boys Harlange/Tarchamps	0–1	US Rumelange
FC Pratzerthal/Rédange	0–4	Progrès Niedercorn
Attert Bissen	0–3	Racing FC
Flaxweiler/Beyren Udinesina 01	1–2	Swift Hesperange
Daring Echternach	1–8	Jeunesse Esch
FC Mamer 32	0–1	FC Differdange 03
Victoria Rosport	0–3 (a.e.t.)	Fola Esch
Young Boys Diekirch	0–7	F91 Dudelange
Mondercange	4–0	FC Cebra 01
US Mondorf-les-Bains	0–2	FC Minerva Lintgen

== Round 6 ==
The winners of Round 5 competed in this round. The games were played on 10 and 11 April 2009.

Team 1	Score	Team 2
Progrès Niedercorn	0–1 (a.e.t.)	UN Käerjéng 97
RM Hamm Benfica	3–0	CS Grevenmacher
US Rumelange	2–0	Swift Hesperange
Avenir Beggen	0–2	Fola Esch
Mondercange	1–3 (a.e.t.)	FC Differdange 03
Jeunesse Esch	1–4	F91 Dudelange
Racing FC	2–3	SC Steinfort
FC Minerva Lintgen	0–2	Etzella Ettelbruck

== Quarter-finals ==
2 May 2009
19:30 CEST

UN Käerjéng 97	9–0	SC Steinfort
Boulahfari 9', 80', 82'; Mandefu 55'; Duarte 61', 74' (pen.); Kivunghe 69'; Fiorani 79'; Polidori 87'

Stade um Bëchel, Hautcharage
Attendance: 316
Referee: Pinto da Costa

3 May 2009
16:00 CEST

FC Differdange 03	1–0	RM Hamm Benfica
Ribeiro Alves 45'

Stade du Thillenberg, Differdange
Attendance: 600
Referee: Luc Wilmes

3 May 2009
16:00 CEST

Fola Esch	0–2	F91 Dudelange
		Kalabić 31'; Da Mota 78'

Stade Émile Mayrisch, Esch-sur-Alzette
Attendance: 675
Referee: Bourgnon

3 May 2009
19:00 CEST

Etzella Ettelbruck	4–1	US Rumelange
Hoffmann 84'; Thimmesch 85'; Leweck 88', 90+1'		Dallo 66'

Stade Am Deich, Ettelbruck
Attendance: 234
Referee: Holtgen

== Semi-finals ==
21 May 2009
18:00 CEST

UN Käerjéng 97	2–0	FC Differdange 03
Lukić 45'; Zydko 90+3'

Stade um Bëchel, Hautcharage
Attendance: 1,250
Referee: Ramalho

21 May 2009
19:30 CEST

Etzella Ettelbruck	0–1	F91 Dudelange
		Alves Scouto 39'

Stade Am Deich, Ettelbruck
Attendance: 950
Referee: Bindels

== Final ==
30 May 2009
17:00 CEST

UN Käerjéng 97	0–5	F91 Dudelange
		Souto 39'; Vairelles 64', 68' da Mota 72'; Rémy 89'

Stade Josy Barthel, Luxembourg City
Attendance: 3,358
Referee: Romain Sales
