= 2012–13 Luxembourg National Division =

99th season of top flight football in Luxembourg

Luxembourg National Division
- Season: 2012–13
- Champions: Fola Esch
- Relegated: Pétange; Union 05 Kayl-Tétange
- Champions League: Fola Esch
- Europa League: F91 Dudelange; Jeunesse Esch; FC Differdange 03
- Matches: 182
- Goals: 610 (3.35 per match)
- Top goalscorer: Stefano Bensi; Edis Osmanović (20 goals)
- Biggest home win: F91 Dudelange 7–1 Wiltz (28 October 2012)
- Biggest away win: Wiltz 0–9 Racing FC; 4 November 2012
- Highest scoring: Wiltz 0–9 Racing FC; 4 November 2012

The 2012–13 Luxembourg National Division was the 99th season of top-tier football in Luxembourg. It began on 5 August 2012 and ended on 25 May 2013. F91 Dudelange were the defending champions having won their tenth league championship in the previous season.

== Team changes from 2011–12 ==
US Rumelange and US Hostert were relegated to the Division of Honour after finishing 13th and 14th in the previous season. Both clubs were relegated after one year in the top flight. They were replaced by 2011–12 Division of Honour champions Jeunesse Canach and runners-up Etzella Ettelbruck. Both clubs return to the top flight after a one-year absence.

Hesperange as 12th-placed team had to compete in a single play-off match against third-placed Division of Honour side Wiltz. Wiltz won the match by 6–2, and they returned to the top division after a one-year absence. Swift Hesperange were relegated to the Division of Honour after an eleven-year stay in the top division.

== Stadia and locations ==
Location of the 2012–13 Luxembourg National Division teams

Team	Venue	Capacity
FC Differdange 03	Stade du Thillenberg	7,830
F91 Dudelange	Stade Jos Nosbaum	2,600
FC Etzella Ettelbruck	Stade Am Deich	2,650
CS Fola Esch	Stade Émile Mayrisch	3,900
CS Grevenmacher	Op Flohr Stadion	4,000
FC Jeunesse Canach	Stade Rue de Lenningen	1,000
Jeunesse Esch	Stade de la Frontière	5,400
UN Käerjeng 97	Stade um Bëschel	1,000
CS Pétange	Stade Municipal (Pétange)	3,300
FC Progrès Niederkorn	Stade Jos Haupert	4,830
Racing FC Union Luxembourg	Stade Achille Hammerel	5,814
FC RM Hamm Benfica	Luxembourg-Cents	2,800
Union 05 Kayl-Tétange	Stade Victor Marchal	1,000
FC Wiltz 71	Stade Géitz	2,000

== League table ==
Pos	Team	Pld	W	D	L	GF	GA	GD	Pts	Qualification or relegation
1	Fola Esch (C)	26	18	5	3	66	23	+43	59	Qualification to Champions League second qualifying round
2	F91 Dudelange	26	16	7	3	53	20	+33	55	Qualification to Europa League first qualifying round (Note: Jeunesse Esch qualified via 2012–13 Luxembourg Cup.)
3	Jeunesse Esch	26	16	2	8	53	30	+23	50	Qualification to Europa League first qualifying round
4	Differdange 03	26	14	5	7	54	34	+20	47	Qualification to Europa League first qualifying round
5	RM Hamm Benfica	26	13	7	6	53	38	+15	46	
6	Grevenmacher	26	11	9	6	43	32	+11	42	
7	Jeunesse Canach	26	10	7	9	40	35	+5	37	
8	Racing FC	26	9	6	11	42	44	−2	33	
9	UN Käerjeng 97	26	9	4	13	44	53	−9	31	
10	Wiltz	26	9	3	14	42	66	−24	30	
11	Etzella Ettelbruck	26	6	9	11	41	61	−20	27	
12	Progrès Niederkorn (O)	26	7	4	15	29	45	−16	25	Qualification to Relegation play-offs
13	Pétange (R)	26	3	5	18	21	56	−35	14	Relegation to Luxembourg Division of Honour
14	Union 05 Kayl-Tétange (R)	26	3	3	20	29	73	−44	12	Relegation to Luxembourg Division of Honour

Source: Soccerway
Rules for classification: 1) points; 2) goal difference; 3) number of goals scored.
(C) Champions; (O) Play-off winners; (R) Relegated

== Results ==
Home \ Away	DIF	DUD	ETZ	FOL	GRE	JEC	JEU	KÄE	PET	PRO	RAC	RMH	UKT	WIL
Differdange 03		2–1	0–0	1–0	2–3	3–1	0–3	0–0	3–0	2–1	6–2	4–2	3–1	0–1
F91 Dudelange	3–0		4–3	0–0	1–1	0–1	0–1	2–1	2–1	3–0	2–1	1–0	3–0	7–1
Etzella Ettelbruck	0–4	0–1		0–5	1–0	1–1	0–4	3–1	2–2	1–1	2–2	2–2	3–3	3–2
Fola Esch	2–1	1–2	5–1		1–1	3–1	0–2	4–1	3–0	4–0	1–1	2–1	4–2	1–0
Grevenmacher	3–2	0–0	4–1	3–3		0–0	0–2	1–0	3–1	3–2	3–3	1–2	2–1	4–1
Jeunesse Canach	1–3	1–1	1–2	1–1	0–2		3–0	3–1	1–2	0–2	1–1	2–2	2–0	6–2
Jeunesse Esch	2–4	0–3	3–2	1–4	0–0	5–1		5–1	3–0	0–0	3–4	0–1	4–1	0–2
UN Käerjeng 97	2–2	1–3	5–3	1–4	2–0	1–1	2–3		3–0	2–0	2–0	2–4	3–2	4–3
Pétange	1–1	0–4	1–1	0–2	1–1	1–2	0–2	1–4		0–2	1–0	0–3	1–1	0–1
Progrès Niederkorn	1–2	1–1	5–1	0–3	2–0	0–2	0–4	0–2	1–0		0–1	1–0	1–3	2–3
Racing FC	1–3	1–1	1–3	0–1	2–1	1–0	0–2	3–0	2–1	3–1		1–1	0–2	0–3
RM Hamm Benfica	2–1	1–1	3–2	2–3	1–1	0–4	1–0	2–1	5–2	2–2	4–1		3–1	2–0
Union 05 Kayl-Tétange	1–0	1–5	1–4	1–6	1–2	0–2	0–2	1–1	1–3	1–3	0–2	1–5		1–5
Wiltz	0–4	1–2	0–0	0–3	0–4	1–2	1–2	3–2	4–2	2–1	0–9	2–2	4–2	

Source: Soccerway
Legend: Blue = home team win; Yellow = draw; Red = away team win.

== Relegation play-offs ==
The 12th-placed club in the National Division competed in a relegation play-off match against the third-placed team from the 2012–13 Division of Honour for one spot in the following season's competition.

30 May 2013
19:30

Progrès Niederkorn	1–0 (a.e.t.)	Strassen
Rougeaux 118'	Report (in French)

Käerjénger Dribbel, Bascharage
Attendance: 1,200

== Season statistics ==
=== Top scorers ===
Rank	Player	Club	Goals
1	(Luxembourg) Stefano Bensi	Fola Esch	20
1	(Bosnia and Herzegovina) Edis Osmanović	Wiltz	20
3	(Morocco) Omar Er Rafik	Differdange 03	13
3	(Luxembourg) David Turpel	Etzella Ettelbruck	13
5	(Bosnia and Herzegovina) Sanel Ibrahimović	Jeunesse Esch	12
5	(France) Tony Lopes	Union 05 Kayl-Tétange	12
5	(Brazil) Oséias	Jeunesse Canach	12
5	(France) Thierry Steinmetz	Dudelange	12
9	(Portugal) François Augusto	RM Hamm Benfica	11
9	(Morocco) Yassine Benajiba	Jeunesse Esch	11
9	(Luxembourg) Daniel Huss	Grevenmacher	11
9	(Luxembourg) Žarko Lukić	Racing FC	11

== See also ==
- 2012–13 Luxembourg Cup
