= 2008–09 Luxembourg National Division =

BGL Ligue
- Season: 2008–09
- Champions: F91 Dudelange; 7th championship
- Relegated: SC Steinfort; Avenir Beggen
- Champions League: F91 Dudelange
- Europa League: FC Differdange 03; CS Grevenmacher; UN Käerjeng 97 (via domestic cup)
- Matches: 182
- Goals: 582 (3.2 per match)
- Biggest home win: RFCU 9–0 Avenir; F91 9–0 Steinfort
- Biggest away win: Rumelange 0–5 Käerjeng
- Highest scoring: RFCU 9–0 Avenir; F91 9–0 Steinfort

The 2008–09 Luxembourg National Division (also known as BGL Ligue due to sponsorship reasons) was the 95th season of top-tier football in Luxembourg. It started on 2 August 2008 and ended on 24 May 2009.

F91 Dudelange successfully defended their title and qualified for the UEFA Champions League. Runners-up FC Differdange 03 and third-placed CS Grevenmacher, as well as domestic cup winners UN Käerjeng 97, will participate in the UEFA Europa League. SC Steinfort and Avenir Beggen were directly relegated while US Rumelange retained their National Division status via relegation play-off.

== Team changes from 2007–08 ==
FC Victoria Rosport and CS Pétange were relegated to the Division of Honour after finishing 13th and 14th in 2007–08. They were replaced by Division of Honour 2007–08 champions US Rumelange and runners-up CS Fola Esch.

FC Wiltz 71 as 12th-placed team had to compete in a single play-off match against 3rd-placed Division of Honour sides SC Steinfort. Steinfort won the match, 2–0, and thus gained promotion to the National Division while Wiltz were relegated as well.

== Stadia and locations ==
Location of teams in National Division 2008–09

Team	Venue	Capacity
FC Avenir Beggen	Stade rue Henri Dunant	4,830
FC Differdange 03	Stade du Thillenberg	7,830
F91 Dudelange	Stade Jos Nosbaum	2,600
FC Etzella Ettelbruck	Stade Am Deich	2,650
CS Fola Esch	Stade Émile Mayrisch	3,900
CS Grevenmacher	Op Flohr Stadion	4,000
Jeunesse Esch	Stade de la Frontière	5,400
UN Käerjeng 97	Stade um Bëschel	1,000
FC Progrès Niederkorn	Stade Jos Haupert	4,830
Racing FC Union Luxembourg	Stade Achille Hammerel	5,814
FC RM Hamm Benfica	Luxembourg-Cents	2,800
US Rumelange	Stade Municipal	2,950
SC Steinfort	Stade Demy Steichen	1,500
FC Swift Hesperange	Stade Alphonse Theis	3,058

== League table ==
Pos	Team	Pld	W	D	L	GF	GA	GD	Pts	Qualification or relegation
1	F91 Dudelange (C)	26	19	5	2	70	18	+52	62	Qualification to Champions League second qualifying round
2	Differdange 03	26	15	6	5	51	37	+14	51	Qualification to Europa League second qualifying round (Note: F91 Dudelange won the 2008–09 Luxembourg Cup competition. Because Dudelange are champions and qualified for 2009–10 UEFA Champions League, Käerjéng, the cup runners-up, will enter the first qualifying round of the UEFA Europa League and league second place Differdange receive the second qualifying round spot.)
3	Grevenmacher	26	12	10	4	55	29	+26	46	Qualification to Europa League first qualifying round
4	Jeunesse Esch	26	12	10	4	45	27	+18	46	
5	Fola Esch	26	11	6	9	43	42	+1	39	
6	RM Hamm Benfica	26	10	7	9	38	29	+9	37	
7	Progrès Niederkorn	26	9	9	8	53	44	+9	36	
8	Etzella Ettelbruck	26	8	8	10	43	48	−5	32	
9	UN Käerjeng 97	26	9	4	13	39	42	−3	31	Qualification to Europa League first qualifying round
10	Racing FC	26	8	6	12	45	48	−3	30	
11	Swift Hesperange	26	8	5	13	29	41	−12	29	
12	Rumelange (O)	26	7	6	13	34	48	−14	27	Qualification to Relegation play-offs
13	SC Steinfort (R)	26	5	6	15	21	54	−33	21	Relegation to Luxembourg Division of Honour
14	Avenir Beggen (R)	26	3	4	19	16	75	−59	13	Relegation to Luxembourg Division of Honour

Source: soccerway.com
Rules for classification: 1) points; 2) goal difference; 3) number of goals scored.
(C) Champions; (O) Play-off winners; (R) Relegated

== Results ==
Home \ Away	AVE	DIF	DUD	ETZ	FOL	GRE	JEU	KÄE	PRO	RAC	RMH	RUM	STF	SWI
Avenir Beggen		0–2	0–2	0–1	1–4	1–2	0–2	1–1	0–3	1–0	0–4	0–2	0–0	1–3
Differdange 03	1–1		1–4	2–1	2–3	2–2	2–1	1–4	4–0	2–2	2–0	2–1	1–1	2–1
F91 Dudelange	5–0	1–2		2–0	4–3	1–3	4–0	3–1	3–0	6–0	1–1	3–2	9–0	4–2
Etzella Ettelbruck	2–3	3–1	0–3		3–0	3–0	2–2	1–1	4–4	3–3	1–1	0–2	2–0	2–0
Fola Esch	3–1	2–3	0–2	1–4		2–2	3–0	0–1	2–0	3–0	1–0	0–0	2–4	3–1
Grevenmacher	6–1	2–0	0–0	6–0	1–1		1–1	3–3	0–0	0–0	1–0	1–3	4–0	0–1
Jeunesse Esch	1–1	1–1	1–1	3–1	1–1	3–1		4–0	2–3	2–1	1–0	3–1	0–0	0–0
UN Käerjeng 97	2–0	1–3	0–3	2–3	0–1	0–2	1–4		3–1	2–1	2–1	3–0	1–2	0–0
Progrès Niederkorn	8–0	2–3	1–1	2–2	4–0	1–4	2–2	2–1		3–3	0–2	3–3	3–0	1–1
Racing FC	9–0	2–2	0–2	3–1	2–2	1–3	0–2	1–4	0–1		3–0 (Note: The match between RFCU Luxembourg and RM Hamm Benfica originally finished 1–1, but was eventually registered with 3–0 due to unknown reasons.)	3–4	3–1	1–0
RM Hamm Benfica	5–0	0–1	1–1	3–1	2–2	2–2	1–1	1–0	3–0	0–2		4–2	2–1	1–3
Rumelange	3–0	1–3	0–1	0–0	4–1	1–1	0–2	0–5	1–5	1–2	0–0		2–1	0–1
SC Steinfort	3–1	0–3	0–3	1–1	0–2	1–5	0–3	2–1	0–0	0–2	0–1	3–0		1–1
Swift Hesperange	1–3	1–3	0–1	3–2	0–1	1–3	0–3	2–0	0–4	3–1	1–3	1–1	2–0	

Source: soccerway.com
Legend: Blue = home team win; Yellow = draw; Red = away team win.

== Relegation play-offs ==
12th placed US Rumelange competed in a relegation play-offs match against the third placed team of Luxembourg Division of Honour, FC Erpeldange 72.

1 June 2009
19:00

US Rumelange	2–0	FC Erpeldange 72

Stade rue Henri Dunant, Beggen, Luxembourg City

== Top goalscorers ==
Rank	Player	Club	Goals
1	(France) Pierre Piskor	FC Differdange 03	30
2	(Luxembourg) Daniel Huss	CS Grevenmacher	20
3	(France) Didier Chaillou	Progrès Niederkorn	19
4	(Poland) Tomasz Gruszczynski	F91 Dudelange	16
5	(France) Tony Vairelles	F91 Dudelange	13
5	(France) Romain Zéwé	Progrès Niederkorn	13
7	(France) Nicolas Caldieri	Progrès Niederkorn	12
7	(Turkey) Fatih Sözen	Swift Hesperange	12
9	(Luxembourg) Stephano Bensi	US Rumelange	11
9	(Germany) Jeremy Laroche	Jeunesse Esch	11
