= Zeghdane =

Zeghdane is a surname. Notable people with the surname include:

- Lehit Zeghdane (born 1977), French-Algerian footballer
- Messaoud Zeghdane (born 1981), Algerian wrestler
- Toufik Zeghdane (born 1992), Algerian footballer
