= 2005–06 UEFA Champions League qualifying rounds =

European football tournament

The qualifying rounds for the 2005–06 UEFA Champions League began on 12 July 2005. In total, there were three qualifying rounds which provided 16 clubs to join the group stage.

== Teams ==
Key to colours
Qualify for the group stage
Eliminated in the Third qualifying round; Advanced to the UEFA Cup first round

Third qualifying round
Team	Coeff.
(England) Manchester United	110.864
(Italy) Internazionale	101.191
(Greece) Panathinaikos	70.715
(Spain) Villarreal	58.326
(Portugal) Sporting CP	55.739
(France) Monaco	53.324
(Netherlands) Ajax	52.145
(Belgium) Club Brugge	50.476
(Scotland) Rangers	40.476
(Germany) Werder Bremen	40.166
(Norway) Rosenborg	36.665
(Czech Republic) Slavia Prague	35.223
(Spain) Real Betis	34.326
(Switzerland) Basel	33.887
(Poland) Wisła Kraków	32.929
(Italy) Udinese	30.191
(Ukraine) Shakhtar Donetsk	28.200
(England) Everton	20.864

Second qualifying round
Team	Coeff.
(Scotland) Celtic	63.476
(Belgium) Anderlecht	47.476
(Ukraine) Dynamo Kyiv	40.200
(Russia) Lokomotiv Moscow	38.469
(Serbia and Montenegro) Partizan	30.012
(Israel) Maccabi Haifa	21.218
(Romania) Steaua București	20.101
(Denmark) Brøndby	19.676
(Austria) Rapid Wien	15.208
(Bulgaria) CSKA Sofia	15.118
(Hungary) Debrecen	14.390
(Turkey) Trabzonspor	12.872
(Norway) Vålerenga	11.665
(Croatia) Hajduk Split	10.980
(Switzerland) Thun	6.887
(Sweden) Malmö FF	5.076

First qualifying round
Team	Coeff.
(England) Liverpool	115.864
(Slovakia) Artmedia Bratislava	4.850
(Cyprus) Anorthosis Famagusta	4.695
(Slovenia) HIT Gorica	4.190
(Georgia (country)) Dinamo Tbilisi	4.035
(Finland) Haka	3.158
(Iceland) FH	2.595
(Republic of Ireland) Shelbourne	2.375
(Bosnia and Herzegovina) Zrinjski Mostar	2.365
(Latvia) Skonto	2.200
(Moldova) Sheriff Tiraspol	2.090
(Lithuania) Kaunas	1.760
(North Macedonia) Rabotnicki	1.485
(Belarus) Dinamo Minsk	1.347
(Malta) Sliema Wanderers	0.990
(Armenia) Pyunik	0.990
(Albania) Tirana	0.880
(Estonia) Levadia Tallinn	0.825
(Northern Ireland) Glentoran	0.715
(Wales) Total Network Solutions	0.605
(Luxembourg) F91 Dudelange	0.550
(Azerbaijan) Neftçi	0.440
(Faroe Islands) HB	0.330
(Kazakhstan) Kairat	0.220

== First qualifying round ==
The draw for this round was performed on 24 June 2005 in Nyon, Switzerland.

=== Seeding ===
Seeded		Unseeded	
(England) Liverpool (Slovakia) Artmedia Bratislava (Cyprus) Anorthosis Famagusta (Slovenia) HIT Gorica (Georgia (country)) Dinamo Tbilisi (Finland) Haka	(Iceland) FH (Republic of Ireland) Shelbourne (Bosnia and Herzegovina) Zrinjski Mostar (Latvia) Skonto (Moldova) Sheriff Tiraspol (Lithuania) Kaunas	(North Macedonia) Rabotnicki (Belarus) Dinamo Minsk (Malta) Sliema Wanderers (Armenia) Pyunik (Albania) Tirana (Estonia) Levadia Tallinn	(Northern Ireland) Glentoran (Wales) Total Network Solutions (Luxembourg) F91 Dudelange (Azerbaijan) Neftçi (Faroe Islands) HB (Kazakhstan) Kairat

=== Summary ===
Title-holders Liverpool, as well as 23 league champions from countries ranked 27 or lower in the 2004 UEFA ranking, were drawn against each other and played two matches, home and away, with the winners advancing to the second qualifying round. Though they finished fifth in the Premier League in 2004–05 (at the time, only four teams from an association were allowed to compete in the Champions League), Liverpool were granted a special exemption by UEFA as the holders, whereby they were placed into the first qualification round, and were drawn against TNS in that round.

Team 1	Agg.	Team 2	1st leg	2nd leg
Levadia Tallinn (Estonia)	1–2	(Georgia (country)) Dinamo Tbilisi	1–0	0–2
Kairat (Kazakhstan)	3–4	(Slovakia) Artmedia Bratislava	2–0	1–4 (a.e.t.)
Neftçi (Azerbaijan)	4–1	(Iceland) FH	2–0	2–1
Rabotnicki (North Macedonia)	6–1	(Latvia) Skonto	6–0	0–1
Dinamo Minsk (Belarus)	1–2	(Cyprus) Anorthosis Famagusta	1–1	0–1
Sliema Wanderers (Malta)	1–6	(Moldova) Sheriff Tiraspol	1–4	0–2
HB (Faroe Islands)	2–8	(Lithuania) Kaunas	2–4	0–4
Liverpool (England)	6–0	(Wales) Total Network Solutions	3–0	3–0
Haka (Finland)	3–2	(Armenia) Pyunik	1–0	2–2
HIT Gorica (Slovenia)	2–3	(Albania) Tirana	2–0	0–3
Glentoran (Northern Ireland)	2–6	(Republic of Ireland) Shelbourne	1–2	1–4
F91 Dudelange (Luxembourg)	4–1	(Bosnia and Herzegovina) Zrinjski Mostar	0–1	4–0 (a.e.t.)

=== Matches ===
12 July 2005
17:30

Levadia Tallinn (Estonia)	1–0	(Georgia (country)) Dinamo Tbilisi
Nahk 45' (pen.)	Report

Kadriorg Stadium, Tallinn
Attendance: 2,200
Referee: Mark Courtney (Northern Ireland)
19 July 2005
16:00

Dinamo Tbilisi (Georgia (country))	2–0	(Estonia) Levadia Tallinn
Melkadze 45'; Orbeladze 50'	Report

Boris Paichadze National Stadium, Tbilisi
Attendance: 5,000
Referee: Alojzije Supraha (Croatia)

Dinamo Tbilisi won 2–1 on aggregate.

12 July 2005
15:30

Kairat (Kazakhstan)	2–0	(Slovakia) Artmedia Bratislava
Fomenka 39'; Artemov 70'	Report

Central Stadium, Almaty
Attendance: 7,000
Referee: René Rogalla (Switzerland)
20 July 2005
20:00

Artmedia Bratislava (Slovakia)	4–1 (a.e.t.)	(Kazakhstan) Kairat
Borbély 21'; Tchuř 52'; Kozák 94' (pen.); Staňo 120+1'	Report	Bogomolov 91'

Národné tréningové centrum, Senec (Note: Artmedia Bratislava played their First qualifying round home match at Národné tréningové centrum in Senec and Second and Third qualifying rounds home matches at Tehelné pole in Bratislava as their regular home venue Štadión Petržalka in Petržalka did not meet UEFA criteria.)
Attendance: 2,895
Referee: Sergey Shmolik (Belarus)

Artmedia Bratislava won 4–3 on aggregate.

12 July 2005
16:00

Neftçi (Azerbaijan)	2–0	(Iceland) FH
Mammadov 20'; Mišura 90+2'	Report

Tofiq Bahramov Republican Stadium, Baku
Attendance: 17,500
Referee: Ivan Bebek (Croatia)
20 July 2005
20:15

FH (Iceland)	1–2	(Azerbaijan) Neftçi
Borgvardt 60'	Report	Mammadov 51'; Nabiyev 75'

Kaplakriki, Hafnarfjörður
Attendance: 650
Referee: Sten Kaldma (Estonia)

Neftçi won 4–1 on aggregate.

12 July 2005
20:00

Rabotnicki (North Macedonia)	6–0	(Latvia) Skonto
Kralevski 30'; Ignatov 56' (pen.); Nuhiu 65', 84'; Trajčev 69'; Maznov 76'	Report

Philip II Arena, Skopje
Attendance: 1,100
Referee: Bruno Paixão (Portugal)
20 July 2005
18:00

Skonto (Latvia)	1–0	(North Macedonia) Rabotnicki
Perepļotkins 90'	Report

Skonto Stadium, Riga
Attendance: 750
Referee: Haim Jakovt (Israel)

Rabotnicki won 6–1 on aggregate.

12 July 2005
18:00

Dinamo Minsk (Belarus)	1–1	(Cyprus) Anorthosis Famagusta
Lentsevich 58'	Report	Frousos 44'

Dinamo Stadium, Minsk
Attendance: 6,000
Referee: Damir Skomina (Slovenia)
20 July 2005
19:30

Anorthosis Famagusta (Cyprus)	1–0	(Belarus) Dinamo Minsk
Samaras 71'	Report

GSP Stadium, Nicosia (Note: Anorthosis Famagusta played their home matches at GSP Stadium in Nicosia, instead of their regular home venue Antonis Papadopoulos Stadium in Larnaca.)
Attendance: 6,667
Referee: Iain Brines (Scotland)

Anorthosis Famagusta won 2–1 on aggregate.

12 July 2005
20:00

Sliema Wanderers (Malta)	1–4	(Moldova) Sheriff Tiraspol
Bogdanović 72'	Report	Epureanu 21', 62'; Kuchuk 25'; Florescu 51'

Ta' Qali National Stadium, Ta' Qali
Attendance: 500
Referee: Michael Ross (Northern Ireland)
20 July 2005
19:30

Sheriff Tiraspol (Moldova)	2–0	(Malta) Sliema Wanderers
Dermé 78'; Cociș 83'	Report

Sheriff Stadium, Tiraspol
Attendance: 1,250
Referee: Mustafa Çulcu (Turkey)

Sheriff Tiraspol won 6–1 on aggregate.

13 July 2005
20:00

HB (Faroe Islands)	2–4	(Lithuania) Kaunas
Thorsteinsson 29'; Jespersen 49'	Report	Velička 2', 25'; Klimek 35'; Zelmikas 48'

Tórsvøllur, Tórshavn (Note: HB played their home match at Tórsvøllur stadium, instead of their regular home venue Gundadalur stadium.)
Attendance: 500
Referee: Brage Sandmoen (Norway)
19 July 2005
17:00

Kaunas (Lithuania)	4–0	(Faroe Islands) HB
Velička 44'; Rimkevičius 63', 82'; Zelmikas 90'	Report

Vėtra Stadium, Vilnius (Note: Match played at Vėtra Stadium in Vilnius, instead of Kaunas regular home venue Darius and Girėnas Stadium in Kaunas.)
Attendance: 2,180
Referee: Tsvetan Georgiev (Bulgaria)

Kaunas won 8–2 on aggregate.

13 July 2005
20:45

Liverpool (England)	3–0	(Wales) Total Network Solutions
Gerrard 8', 21', 89'	Report

Anfield, Liverpool
Attendance: 44,760
Referee: Joeri van de Velde (Belgium)
19 July 2005
21:00

Total Network Solutions (Wales)	0–3	(England) Liverpool
	Report	Cissé 26'; Gerrard 82', 83'

Racecourse Ground, Wrexham (Note: Total Network Solutions played their home match at Racecourse Ground in Wrexham as their regular home venue Recreation Ground in Llansantffraid did not meet UEFA criteria.)
Attendance: 8,009
Referee: Carlo Bertolini (Switzerland)

Liverpool won 6–0 on aggregate.

13 July 2005
17:30

Haka (Finland)	1–0	(Armenia) Pyunik
Pasoja 26'	Report

Tehtaan kenttä, Valkeakoski
Attendance: 850
Referee: Serhiy Berezka (Ukraine)
20 July 2005
16:00

Pyunik (Armenia)	2–2	(Finland) Haka
Pachajyan 3'; Diawara 30'	Report	Mattila 38'; Fowler 63'

Vazgen Sargsyan Republican Stadium, Yerevan
Attendance: 1,840
Referee: Sorin Corpodean (Romania)

Haka won 3–2 on aggregate.

13 July 2005
20:00

HIT Gorica (Slovenia)	2–0	(Albania) Tirana
M. Kovačevič 66'; Birsa 82'	Report

Nova Gorica Sports Park, Nova Gorica
Attendance: 1,800
Referee: Karen Nalbandyan (Armenia)
20 July 2005
20:30

Tirana (Albania)	3–0	(Slovenia) HIT Gorica
Rraklli 38'; Dabulla 42'; Salihi 47'	Report

Qemal Stafa Stadium, Tirana
Attendance: 3,500
Referee: Bruno Coue (France)

Tirana won 3–2 on aggregate.

13 July 2005
20:00

Glentoran (Northern Ireland)	1–2	(Republic of Ireland) Shelbourne
Ward 77'	Report	J. Byrne 55', 65' (pen.)

The Oval, Belfast
Attendance: 2,810
Referee: Georgios Kasnaferis (Greece)
20 July 2005
20:30

Shelbourne (Republic of Ireland)	4–1	(Northern Ireland) Glentoran
Heary 13'; J. Byrne 32' (pen.), 71'; Crowe 58'	Report	McCann 21'

Tolka Park, Dublin
Attendance: 4,500
Referee: Peter Sippel (Germany)

Shelbourne won 6–2 on aggregate.

13 July 2005
19:00

F91 Dudelange (Luxembourg)	0–1	(Bosnia and Herzegovina) Zrinjski Mostar
	Report	B. Marić 15'

Stade Jos Nosbaum, Dudelange
Attendance: 1,308
Referee: Joseph Attard (Malta)
20 July 2005
17:00

Zrinjski Mostar (Bosnia and Herzegovina)	0–4 (a.e.t.)	(Luxembourg) F91 Dudelange
	Report	Gruszczyński 90+3', 105'; Di Gregorio 96'; Hug 112'

Stadion pod Bijelim Brijegom, Mostar
Attendance: 5,000
Referee: Aleksandr Gvardis (Russia)

F91 Dudelange won 4–1 on aggregate.

== Second qualifying round ==
The draw for this round was performed on 24 June 2005 in Nyon, Switzerland.

=== Seeding ===
Seeded		Unseeded	
(England) Liverpool (Scotland) Celtic (Belgium) Anderlecht (Ukraine) Dynamo Kyiv (Russia) Lokomotiv Moscow (Serbia and Montenegro) Partizan (Israel) Maccabi Haifa	(Romania) Steaua București (Denmark) Brøndby (Austria) Rapid Wien (Bulgaria) CSKA Sofia (Hungary) Debrecen (Turkey) Trabzonspor (Norway) Vålerenga	(Croatia) Hajduk Split (Switzerland) Thun (Sweden) Malmö FF (Slovakia) Artmedia Bratislava (Cyprus) Anorthosis Famagusta (Albania) Tirana (Georgia (country)) Dinamo Tbilisi	(Finland) Haka (Azerbaijan) Neftçi (Republic of Ireland) Shelbourne (Luxembourg) F91 Dudelange (North Macedonia) Rabotnicki (Moldova) Sheriff Tiraspol (Lithuania) Kaunas

Notes

1. ^{†} Winners of the previous qualifying round whose identity was not known at the time of the draw. Teams in italics defeated a team with a higher coefficient in the previous qualifying round, thus effectively taking the coefficient of their defeated opponent in the draw for this round.

=== Summary ===
The 12 winners from the first qualifying round, 10 champions from countries ranked 17–26, and six second–placed teams from countries ranked 10–15 were drawn against each other and played two matches, home and away, with the winners advancing to the third qualifying round.

Team 1	Agg.	Team 2	1st leg	2nd leg
Kaunas (Lithuania)	1–5	(England) Liverpool	1–3	0–2
Dinamo Tbilisi (Georgia (country))	1–5	(Denmark) Brøndby	0–2	1–3
Anderlecht (Belgium)	5–1	(Azerbaijan) Neftçi	5–0	0–1
Vålerenga (Norway)	5–1	(Finland) Haka	1–0	4–1
Dynamo Kyiv (Ukraine)	2–3	(Switzerland) Thun	2–2	0–1
Anorthosis Famagusta (Cyprus)	3–2	(Turkey) Trabzonspor	3–1	0–1
Artmedia Bratislava (Slovakia)	5–4	(Scotland) Celtic	5–0	0–4
Tirana (Albania)	0–4	(Bulgaria) CSKA Sofia	0–2	0–2
Malmö FF (Sweden)	5–4	(Israel) Maccabi Haifa	3–2	2–2
Shelbourne (Republic of Ireland)	1–4	(Romania) Steaua București	0–0	1–4
Rabotnicki (North Macedonia)	1–3	(Russia) Lokomotiv Moscow	1–1	0–2
F91 Dudelange (Luxembourg)	3–9	(Austria) Rapid Wien	1–6	2–3
Partizan (Serbia and Montenegro)	2–0	(Moldova) Sheriff Tiraspol	1–0	1–0
Debrecen (Hungary)	8–0	(Croatia) Hajduk Split	3–0	5–0

=== Matches ===
26 July 2005
20:45

Kaunas (Lithuania)	1–3	(England) Liverpool
Barevičius 21'	Report	Cissé 27'; Carragher 30'; Gerrard 55' (pen.)

Darius and Girėnas Stadium, Kaunas
Attendance: 6,750
Referee: Knud Erik Fisker (Denmark)
2 August 2005
20:45

Liverpool (England)	2–0	(Lithuania) Kaunas
Gerrard 77'; Cissé 86'	Report

Anfield, Liverpool
Attendance: 43,717
Referee: Gianluca Paparesta (Italy)

Liverpool won 5–1 on aggregate.

26 July 2005
17:00

Dinamo Tbilisi (Georgia (country))	0–2	(Denmark) Brøndby
	Report	Skoubo 59'; Elmander 83'

Boris Paichadze National Stadium, Tbilisi
Attendance: 17,500
Referee: István Vad (Hungary)
3 August 2005
20:15

Brøndby (Denmark)	3–1	(Georgia (country)) Dinamo Tbilisi
Lorentzen 9'; Aladashvili 42' (o.g.); Kamper 86'	Report	Iashvili 65'

Brøndby Stadium, Brøndbyvester
Attendance: 13,150
Referee: Michael Weiner (Germany)

Brøndby won 5–1 on aggregate.

26 July 2005
20:30

Anderlecht (Belgium)	5–0	(Azerbaijan) Neftçi
Tihinen 21'; Jestrović 24'; Mpenza 32'; Goor 35'; Vanderhaeghe 77'	Report

Constant Vanden Stock Stadium, Brussels
Attendance: 21,055
Referee: Darko Čeferin (Slovenia)
3 August 2005
17:00

Neftçi (Azerbaijan)	1–0	(Belgium) Anderlecht
Boreț 5' (pen.)	Report

Tofiq Bahramov Republican Stadium, Baku
Attendance: 8,000
Referee: Viktor Kassai (Hungary)

Anderlecht won 5–1 on aggregate.

26 July 2005
20:45

Vålerenga (Norway)	1–0	(Finland) Haka
dos Santos 50' (pen.)	Report

Ullevaal Stadion, Oslo
Attendance: 6,297
Referee: Alan Kelly (Republic of Ireland)
3 August 2005
17:00

Haka (Finland)	1–4	(Norway) Vålerenga
Lehtinen 9'	Report	Wæhler 26'; Flo 28', 74'; Iversen 59'

Tehtaan kenttä, Valkeakoski
Attendance: 1,750
Referee: Howard Webb (England)

Vålerenga won 5–1 on aggregate.

26 July 2005
19:00

Dynamo Kyiv (Ukraine)	2–2	(Switzerland) Thun
Husyev 20'; Shatskikh 40'	Report	Lustrinelli 38'; Aegerter 66'

Valeriy Lobanovskyi Dynamo Stadium, Kyiv
Attendance: 16,800
Referee: Dejan Delević (Serbia and Montenegro)
3 August 2005
20:15

Thun (Switzerland)	1–0	(Ukraine) Dynamo Kyiv
Bernardini 90+2'	Report

Stade de Suisse, Bern (Note: Thun played their home matches at Stade de Suisse, Bern, instead of their regular stadium Stadion Lachen, Thun which did not meet UEFA requirements.)
Attendance: 25,728
Referee: Pedro Proença (Portugal)

Thun won 3–2 on aggregate.

26 July 2005
19:30

Anorthosis Famagusta (Cyprus)	3–1	(Turkey) Trabzonspor
Nicolaou 25'; Frousos 83'; Tsitaishvili 90'	Report	Fatih Tekke 77'

GSP Stadium, Nicosia
Attendance: 14,613
Referee: Tommy Skjerven (Norway)
3 August 2005
19:00

Trabzonspor (Turkey)	1–0	(Cyprus) Anorthosis Famagusta
Fatih Tekke 40'	Report

Hüseyin Avni Aker Stadium, Trabzon
Attendance: 37,500
Referee: Gerald Lehner (Austria)

Anorthosis Famagusta won 3–2 on aggregate.

27 July 2005
20:00

Artmedia Bratislava (Slovakia)	5–0	(Scotland) Celtic
Halenár 43', 76', 89'; Vaščák 57'; Mikulič 78'	Report

Tehelné pole, Bratislava
Attendance: 17,632
Referee: Selçuk Dereli (Turkey)
2 August 2005
20:45

Celtic (Scotland)	4–0	(Slovakia) Artmedia Bratislava
Thompson 21' (pen.); Hartson 44'; McManus 54'; Beattie 82'	Report

Celtic Park, Glasgow
Attendance: 50,063
Referee: Alberto Undiano Mallenco (Spain)

Artmedia Bratislava won 5–4 on aggregate.

27 July 2005
20:30

Tirana (Albania)	0–2	(Bulgaria) CSKA Sofia
	Report	Gueye 89'; Gargorov 90+2'

Qemal Stafa Stadium, Tirana
Attendance: 6,000
Referee: Kristinn Jakobsson (Iceland)
3 August 2005
19:45

CSKA Sofia (Bulgaria)	2–0	(Albania) Tirana
Zadi 2'; Todorov 90'	Report

Stadion Balgarska Armia, Sofia
Attendance: 3,100
Referee: Martin Ingvarsson (Sweden)

CSKA Sofia won 4–0 on aggregate.

27 July 2005
20:00

Malmö FF (Sweden)	3–2	(Israel) Maccabi Haifa
Osmanovski 33'; D. Andersson 42' (pen.); Mattisson 68'	Report	Harazi 2'; Colautti 44'

Malmö Stadion, Malmö
Attendance: 10,950
Referee: Julián Rodríguez Santiago (Spain)
3 August 2005
18:00

Maccabi Haifa (Israel)	2–2	(Sweden) Malmö FF
Colautti 10'; Arbeitman 60'	Report	Alves 21'; Abelsson 89'

Bloomfield Stadium, Tel Aviv (Note: Match played at Bloomfield Stadium in Tel Aviv, as Maccabi Haifa regular home venue Kiryat Eliezer Stadium in Haifa did not meet UEFA criteria.)
Attendance: 14,450
Referee: Alexandru Tudor (Romania)

Malmö FF won 5–4 on aggregate.

27 July 2005
20:30

Shelbourne (Republic of Ireland)	0–0	(Romania) Steaua București
	Report

Tolka Park, Dublin
Attendance: 8,500
Referee: Romans Lajuks (Latvia)
3 August 2005
19:30

Steaua București (Romania)	4–1	(Republic of Ireland) Shelbourne
Nicoliță 18'; Iacob 27'; Diniță 61'; Oprița 90+4' (pen.)	Report	J. Byrne 38'

Stadionul Steaua, Bucharest
Attendance: 8,775
Referee: Claude Colombo (France)

Steaua București won 4–1 on aggregate.

27 July 2005
20:00

Rabotnicki (North Macedonia)	1–1	(Russia) Lokomotiv Moscow
Nuhiu 12'	Report	Sychev 90+1'

Philip II Arena, Skopje
Attendance: 6,000
Referee: Dougie McDonald (Scotland)
3 August 2005
18:00

Lokomotiv Moscow (Russia)	2–0	(North Macedonia) Rabotnicki
Sychev 75'; Asatiani 85'	Report

Lokomotiv Stadium, Moscow
Attendance: 19,650
Referee: Nicolai Vollquartz (Denmark)

Lokomotiv Moscow won 3–1 on aggregate.

27 July 2005
18:00

F91 Dudelange (Luxembourg)	1–6	(Austria) Rapid Wien
Martine 8'	Report	Lawarée 2', 65'; Akagündüz 3', 15'; Hofmann 5'; Kienast 84'

Stade Jos Nosbaum, Dudelange
Attendance: 1,567
Referee: Craig Thomson (Scotland)
3 August 2005
20:15

Rapid Wien (Austria)	3–2	(Luxembourg) F91 Dudelange
Lawarée 47', 81'; Dollinger 86'	Report	Tosun 7' (o.g.); Gruszczyński 37'

Gerhard Hanappi Stadium, Vienna
Attendance: 8,625
Referee: Athanassios Briakos (Greece)

Rapid Wien won 9–3 on aggregate.

27 July 2005
19:30

Partizan (Serbia and Montenegro)	1–0	(Moldova) Sheriff Tiraspol
Odita 63'	Report

Partizan Stadium, Belgrade
Attendance: 13,100
Referee: Krzysztof Slupik (Poland)
3 August 2005
19:30

Sheriff Tiraspol (Moldova)	0–1	(Serbia and Montenegro) Partizan
	Report	Odita 74'

Sheriff Stadium, Tiraspol
Attendance: 11,000
Referee: Pascal Garibian (France)

Partizan won 2–0 on aggregate.

27 July 2005
20:45

Debrecen (Hungary)	3–0	(Croatia) Hajduk Split
Bogdanović 26', 40'; Kerekes 58'	Report

Stadion Oláh Gábor Út, Debrecen
Attendance: 6,500
Referee: Knut Kircher (Germany)
3 August 2005
20:15

Hajduk Split (Croatia)	0–5	(Hungary) Debrecen
	Report	Halmosi 1', 27'; Kerekes 22'; Sidibe 76'; Kiss 90'

Stadion Poljud, Split
Attendance: 2,750
Referee: Richard Havrilla (Slovakia)

Debrecen won 8–0 on aggregate.

== Third qualifying round ==
The draw for this round was performed on 29 July 2005 in Nyon, Switzerland.

=== Seeding ===
Seeded		Unseeded	
(England) Liverpool (England) Manchester United (Italy) Internazionale (Greece) Panathinaikos (Slovakia) Artmedia Bratislava (Spain) Villarreal (Portugal) Sporting CP (France) Monaco	(Netherlands) Ajax (Belgium) Club Brugge (Belgium) Anderlecht (Scotland) Rangers (Switzerland) Thun (Germany) Werder Bremen (Russia) Lokomotiv Moscow (Norway) Rosenborg	(Czech Republic) Slavia Prague (Spain) Real Betis (Switzerland) Basel (Poland) Wisła Kraków (Italy) Udinese (Serbia and Montenegro) Partizan (Ukraine) Shakhtar Donetsk (England) Everton	(Sweden) Malmö FF (Romania) Steaua București (Denmark) Brøndby (Austria) Rapid Wien (Bulgaria) CSKA Sofia (Hungary) Debrecen (Cyprus) Anorthosis Famagusta (Norway) Vålerenga

Notes

1. ^{†} Winners of the previous qualifying round whose identity was not known at the time of the draw. Teams in italics defeated a team with a higher coefficient in the previous qualifying round, thus effectively taking the coefficient of their defeated opponent in the draw for this round.

=== Summary ===
The 14 winners from the second qualifying round, six champions from countries ranked 11–16, three second–placed teams from countries ranked 7–9, six third–placed teams from countries ranked 1–6, and three fourth–placed teams from countries ranked 1–3 were drawn to play 2 matches, home and away, with the winners advancing to the group stage and losers advancing to the first round of the UEFA Cup.

Team 1	Agg.	Team 2	1st leg	2nd leg
Wisła Kraków (Poland)	4–5	(Greece) Panathinaikos	3–1	1–4 (a.e.t.)
Real Betis (Spain)	3–2	(France) Monaco	1–0	2–2
Vålerenga (Norway)	1–1 (3–4 p)	(Belgium) Club Brugge	1–0	0–1 (a.e.t.)
Manchester United (England)	6–0	(Hungary) Debrecen	3–0	3–0
Everton (England)	2–4	(Spain) Villarreal	1–2	1–2
Anorthosis Famagusta (Cyprus)	1–4	(Scotland) Rangers	1–2	0–2
Steaua București (Romania)	3–4	(Norway) Rosenborg	1–1	2–3
Rapid Wien (Austria)	2–1	(Russia) Lokomotiv Moscow	1–1	1–0
Artmedia Bratislava (Slovakia)	0–0 (4–3 p)	(Serbia and Montenegro) Partizan	0–0	0–0 (a.e.t.)
CSKA Sofia (Bulgaria)	2–3	(England) Liverpool	1–3	1–0
Sporting CP (Portugal)	2–4	(Italy) Udinese	0–1	2–3
Malmö FF (Sweden)	0–4	(Switzerland) Thun	0–1	0–3
Shakhtar Donetsk (Ukraine)	1–3	(Italy) Internazionale	0–2	1–1
Basel (Switzerland)	2–4	(Germany) Werder Bremen	2–1	0–3
Brøndby (Denmark)	3–5	(Netherlands) Ajax	2–2	1–3
Anderlecht (Belgium)	4–1	(Czech Republic) Slavia Prague	2–1	2–0

=== Matches ===
9 August 2005
20:45

Wisła Kraków (Poland)	3–1	(Greece) Panathinaikos
Brożek 13'; Uche 52'; Frankowski 70'	Report	Olisadebe 4'

Stadion Miejski, Kraków
Attendance: 7,225
Referee: Claus Bo Larsen (Denmark)
23 August 2005
20:45

Panathinaikos (Greece)	4–1 (a.e.t.)	(Poland) Wisła Kraków
Morris 62'; Olisadebe 65'; Papadopoulos 87'; Kotsios 114'	Report	Sobolewski 78'

Olympic Stadium, Athens
Attendance: 43,750
Referee: Mike RIley (England)

Panathinaikos won 5–4 on aggregate.

9 August 2005
22:00

Real Betis (Spain)	1–0	(France) Monaco
Edu 90+3'	Report

Estadio Manuel Ruiz de Lopera, Seville
Attendance: 19,125
Referee: Graham Poll (England)
23 August 2005
20:45

Monaco (France)	2–2	(Spain) Real Betis
Gerard 33'; Maoulida 63'	Report	Oliveira 17', 77'

Stade Louis II, Monaco
Attendance: 13,000
Referee: Ľuboš Micheľ (Slovakia)

Real Betis won 3–2 on aggregate.

9 August 2005
21:00

Vålerenga (Norway)	1–0	(Belgium) Club Brugge
Iversen 56'	Report

Ullevaal Stadion, Oslo
Attendance: 13,778
Referee: Vladimír Hriňák (Slovakia)
24 August 2005
20:30

Club Brugge (Belgium)	1–0 (a.e.t.)	(Norway) Vålerenga
Balaban 79'	Report
Penalties
Vermant (penalty scored); Klukowski (penalty scored); Blondel (penalty scored); Dufer (penalty missed); Balaban (penalty scored)	4–3	(penalty scored) Berre; (penalty missed) Hulsker; (penalty scored) Skiri; (penalty scored) Gashi; (penalty missed) dos Santos

Jan Breydel Stadium, Bruges
Attendance: 20,144
Referee: Konrad Plautz (Austria)

1–1 on aggregate; Club Brugge won 4–3 on penalties.

9 August 2005
21:05

Manchester United (England)	3–0	(Hungary) Debrecen
Rooney 7'; Van Nistelrooy 49'; Ronaldo 63'	Report

Old Trafford, Manchester
Attendance: 51,701
Referee: Luis Medina Cantalejo (Spain)
24 August 2005
20:30

Debrecen (Hungary)	0–3	(England) Manchester United
	Report	Heinze 20', 61'; Richardson 65'

Ferenc Puskás Stadium, Budapest
Attendance: 27,000
Referee: Massimo Busacca (Switzerland)

Manchester United won 6–0 on aggregate.

9 August 2005
21:05

Everton (England)	1–2	(Spain) Villarreal
Beattie 42'	Report	Figueroa 27'; Josico 45+1'

Goodison Park, Liverpool
Attendance: 37,685
Referee: Tom Henning Øvrebø (Norway)
24 August 2005
22:00

Villarreal (Spain)	2–1	(England) Everton
Sorín 20'; Forlán 90+2'	Report	Arteta 69'

Estadio El Madrigal, Villarreal
Attendance: 21,500
Referee: Pierluigi Collina (Italy)

Villarreal won 4–2 on aggregate.

9 August 2005
20:00

Anorthosis Famagusta (Cyprus)	1–2	(Scotland) Rangers
Frousos 72'	Report	Novo 64'; Ricksen 71'

GSP Stadium, Nicosia
Attendance: 16,900
Referee: Frank De Bleeckere (Belgium)
24 August 2005
20:45

Rangers (Scotland)	2–0	(Cyprus) Anorthosis Famagusta
Buffel 39'; Pršo 58'	Report

Ibrox Stadium, Glasgow
Attendance: 48,500
Referee: Valentin Ivanov (Russia)

Rangers won 4–1 on aggregate.

10 August 2005
21:00

Steaua București (Romania)	1–1	(Norway) Rosenborg
Iacob 30'	Report	Helstad 85'

Stadionul Steaua, Bucharest
Attendance: 11,500
Referee: Eric Braamhaar (Netherlands)
23 August 2005
20:45

Rosenborg (Norway)	3–2	(Romania) Steaua București
Solli 38'; Ødegaard 57'; Rădoi 60' (o.g.)	Report	Rădoi 74'; Iacob 76'

Lerkendal Stadion, Trondheim
Attendance: 13,051
Referee: Alain Sars (France)

Rosenborg won 4–3 on aggregate.

10 August 2005
20:45

Rapid Wien (Austria)	1–1	(Russia) Lokomotiv Moscow
Valachovič 75'	Report	Samedov 10'

Gerhard Hanappi Stadium, Vienna
Attendance: 17,455
Referee: Lucílio Batista (Portugal)
23 August 2005
17:00

Lokomotiv Moscow (Russia)	0–1	(Austria) Rapid Wien
	Report	Valachovič 84'

Lokomotiv Stadium, Moscow
Attendance: 27,825
Referee: Manuel Mejuto González (Spain)

Rapid Wien won 2–1 on aggregate.

10 August 2005
20:00

Artmedia Bratislava (Slovakia)	0–0	(Serbia and Montenegro) Partizan
	Report

Tehelné pole, Bratislava
Attendance: 16,127
Referee: Peter Fröjdfeldt (Sweden)
23 August 2005
20:00

Partizan (Serbia and Montenegro)	0–0 (a.e.t.)	(Slovakia) Artmedia Bratislava
	Report
Penalties
Nađ (penalty scored); Mirković (penalty missed); Bajić (penalty scored); Vukčević (penalty scored); Boya (penalty missed); Brnović (penalty missed)	3–4	(penalty scored) Fodrek; (penalty missed) Kozák; (penalty scored) Halenár; (penalty missed) Fábio Gomes; (penalty scored) Debnár; (penalty scored) Ďurica

Partizan Stadium, Belgrade
Attendance: 26,350
Referee: Steve Bennett (England)

0–0 on aggregate; Artmedia Bratislava won 4–3 on penalties.

10 August 2005
20:45

CSKA Sofia (Bulgaria)	1–3	(England) Liverpool
Dimitrov 45'	Report	Cissé 25'; Morientes 31', 58'

Vasil Levski National Stadium, Sofia (Note: Match played at Vasil Levski National Stadium, instead of CSKA regular home venue Stadion Balgarska Armia.)
Attendance: 16,512
Referee: Jan Wegereef (Netherlands)
23 August 2005
21:05

Liverpool (England)	0–1	(Bulgaria) CSKA Sofia
	Report	Iliev 16'

Anfield, Liverpool
Attendance: 42,175
Referee: Wolfgang Stark (Germany)

Liverpool won 3–2 on aggregate.

10 August 2005
22:15

Sporting CP (Portugal)	0–1	(Italy) Udinese
	Report	Iaquinta 27' (pen.)

Estádio José Alvalade, Lisbon
Attendance: 35,475
Referee: Kyros Vassaras (Greece)
23 August 2005
20:45

Udinese (Italy)	3–2	(Portugal) Sporting CP
Iaquinta 23' (pen.); Natali 35'; Barreto 90+1'	Report	Douala 39'; Pinilla 90+2'

Stadio Friuli, Udine
Attendance: 23,525
Referee: Terje Hauge (Norway)

Udinese won 4–2 on aggregate.

10 August 2005
18:45

Malmö FF (Sweden)	0–1	(Switzerland) Thun
	Report	Pimenta 34'

Malmö Stadion, Malmö
Attendance: 12,237
Referee: Arturo Daudén Ibáñez (Spain)
23 August 2005
20:15

Thun (Switzerland)	3–0	(Sweden) Malmö FF
Bernardini 26'; Lustrinelli 40', 66'	Report

Stade de Suisse, Bern
Attendance: 31,250
Referee: Stefano Farina (Italy)

Thun won 4–0 on aggregate.

10 August 2005
20:00

Shakhtar Donetsk (Ukraine)	0–2	(Italy) Internazionale
	Report	Martins 68'; Adriano 78'

RSC Olimpiyskiy, Donetsk
Attendance: 25,000
Referee: Alain Hamer (Luxembourg)
24 August 2005
21:00

Internazionale (Italy)	1–1	(Ukraine) Shakhtar Donetsk
Recoba 12'	Report	Elano 25'

San Siro, Milan
Attendance: 0 (Note: Match played behind closed doors as Inter were serving a punishment for spectacors' misconduct in the previous season's Champions League quarter-final match against Milan.)
Referee: Herbert Fandel (Germany)

Internazionale won 3–1 on aggregate.

10 August 2005
20:45

Basel (Switzerland)	2–1	(Germany) Werder Bremen
Degen 27'; Rossi 52'	Report	Klose 73'

St. Jakob-Park, Basel
Attendance: 28,101
Referee: Paul Allaerts (Belgium)
24 August 2005
20:45

Werder Bremen (Germany)	3–0	(Switzerland) Basel
Klasnić 64', 72'; Borowski 67' (pen.)	Report

Weserstadion, Bremen
Attendance: 30,339
Referee: Kim Milton Nielsen (Denmark)

Werder Bremen won 4–2 on aggregate.

10 August 2005
19:00

Brøndby (Denmark)	2–2	(Netherlands) Ajax
Skoubo 33'; Escudé 90+3' (o.g.)	Report	Rosenberg 31'; Babel 73'

Brøndby Stadium, Brøndbyvester
Attendance: 24,917
Referee: Massimo De Santis (Italy)
24 August 2005
20:30

Ajax (Netherlands)	3–1	(Denmark) Brøndby
Babel 50'; Sneijder 80', 89'	Report	Elmander 44'

Amsterdam Arena, Amsterdam
Attendance: 39,075
Referee: Markus Merk (Germany)

Ajax won 5–3 on aggregate.

10 August 2005
20:30

Anderlecht (Belgium)	2–1	(Czech Republic) Slavia Prague
Goor 7'; Mpenza 38'	Report	Jarolím 21'

Constant Vanden Stock Stadium, Brussels
Attendance: 17,866
Referee: Yuri Baskakov (Russia)
24 August 2005
20:05

Slavia Prague (Czech Republic)	0–2	(Belgium) Anderlecht
	Report	Serhat 72'; Mpenza 84'

Stadion Evžena Rošického, Prague
Attendance: 17,216
Referee: Éric Poulat (France)

Anderlecht won 4–1 on aggregate.
