= Stade An Der Trell =

Football stadium in Erpeldange, Luxembourg

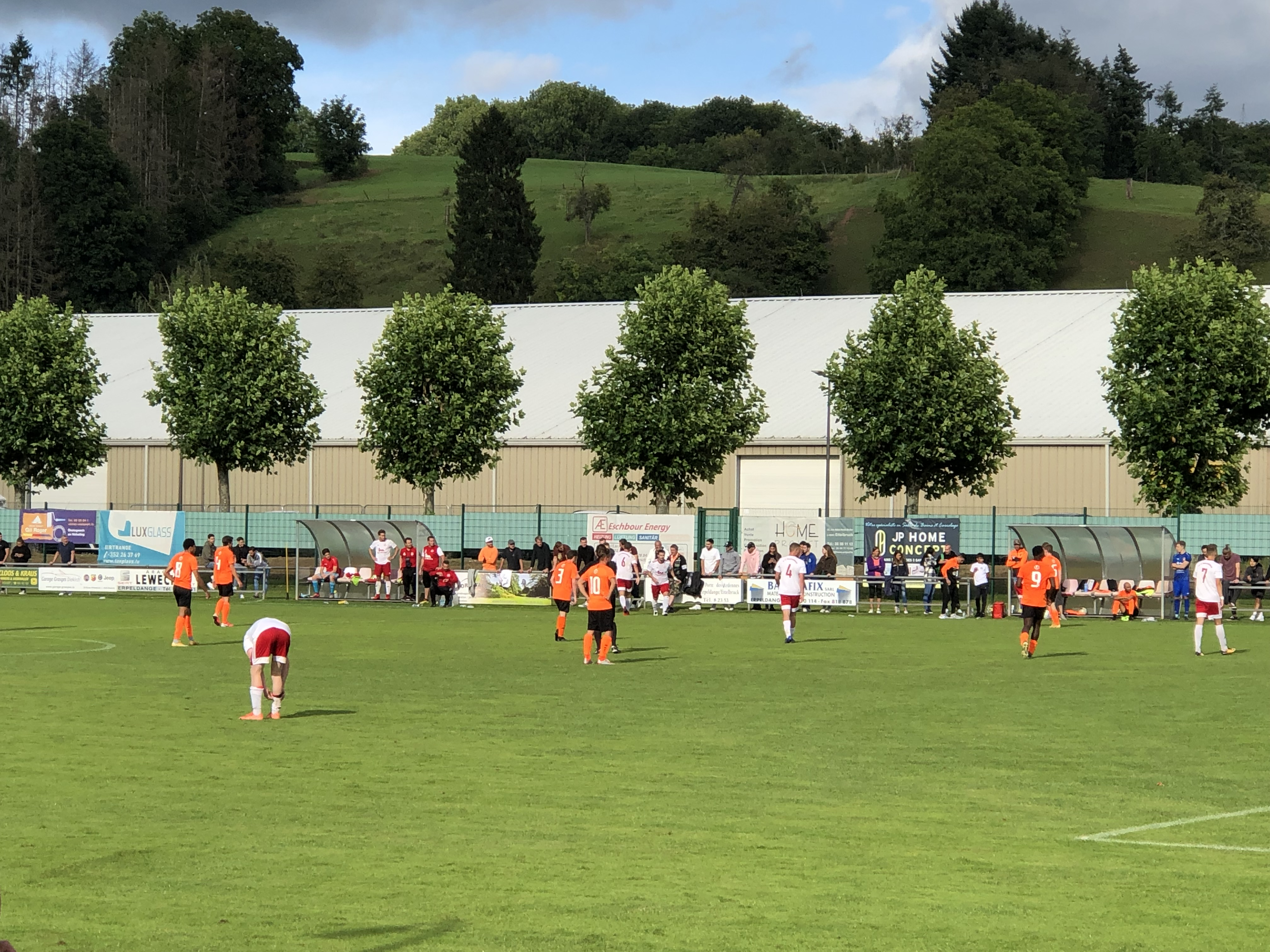
- Stade An Der Trell, Erpeldange-sur-Sûre, Luxembourg
- Interactive map of Stade An Der Trell
- Full name: Stade An Der Trell
- Location: Erpeldange, Luxembourg
- Coordinates: 49.8619°N 6.1157°E
- Capacity: 1,000
- Surface: grass

Tenant
- FC Erpeldange 72

Stade An Der Trell is a football stadium in Erpeldange-sur-Sûre, in central Luxembourg.

It is currently the home stadium of FC 72 Erpeldange. The stadium has a capacity of 1,000.

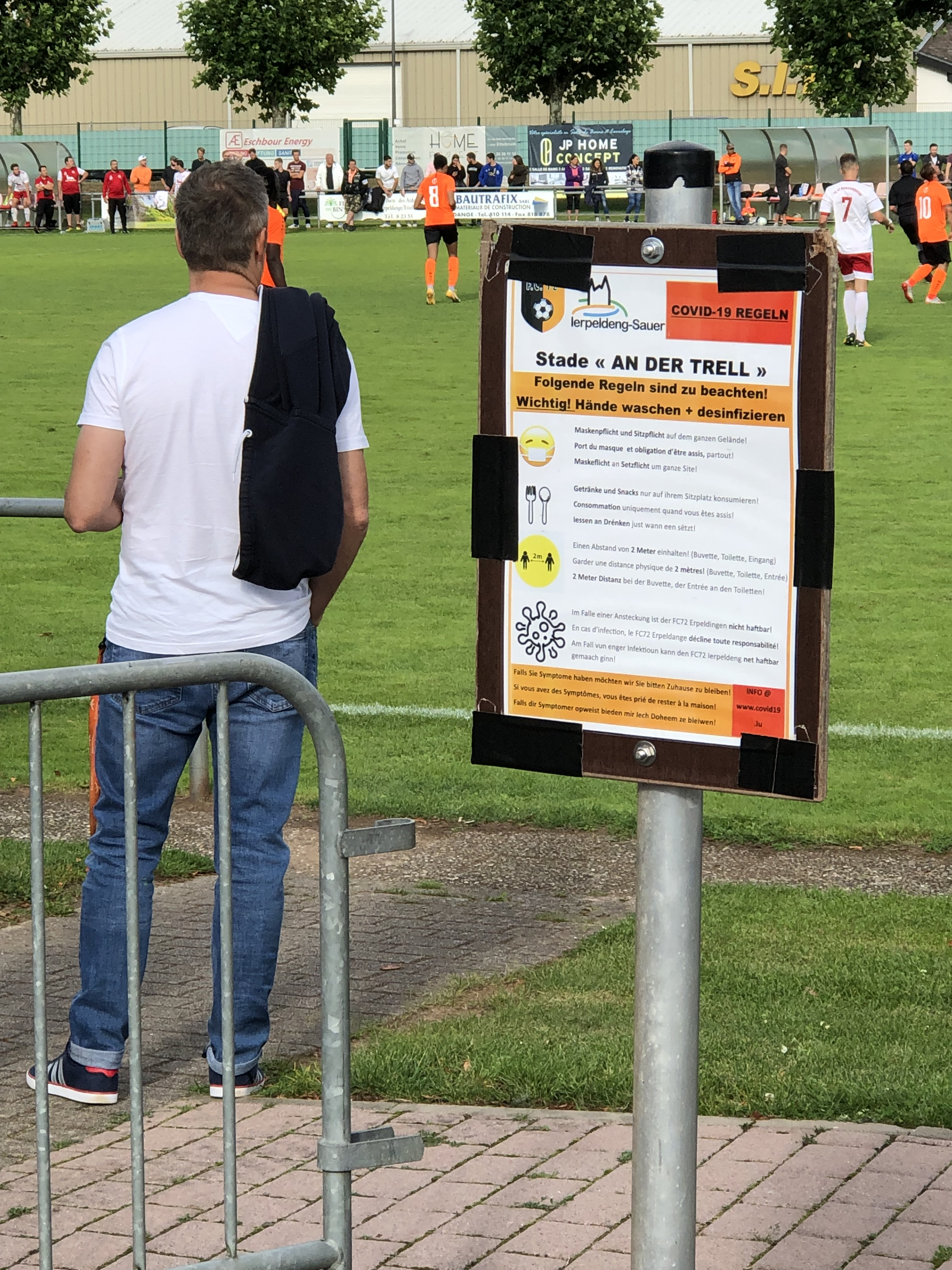
Stade An Der Trell COVID-19 rules, Erpeldange, Luxembourg
