= Carlo Pace =

Luxembourgish footballer

Personal information
- Date of birth: 7 April 1978 (age 48)
- Position: Forward

Senior career*
Years	Team	Apps	(Gls)
1995–1997	Red Boys Differdange		
1997–1999	Jeunesse Esch		
1999–2001	Union Luxembourg		
2001–2004	Avenir Beggen		
2004–2008	Käerjéng 97		
2008–2010	Differdange 03		
2010–2012	US Rumelange		

International career
2005	Luxembourg	4	(0)
- * Club domestic league appearances and goals

Carlo Pace (born 7 April 1978) is a retired Luxembourgish football striker.
