= 2011–12 Luxembourg National Division =

Luxembourg National Division
- Season: 2011–12
- Champions: F91 Dudelange
- Relegated: FC Swift Hesperange; US Rumelange; US Hostert
- Champions League: F91 Dudelange
- Europa League: Jeunesse Esch; CS Grevenmacher; FC Differdange 03
- Matches: 182
- Goals: 592 (3.25 per match)
- Top goalscorer: Omar Er Rafik (Differdange 03) (23)
- Biggest home win: F91 10-0 Pétange
- Biggest away win: Hostert 1-9 F91
- Highest scoring: Hostert 1-9 F91; RM Hamm B. 8-2 Swift; F91 10-0 Pétange

The 2011–12 Luxembourg National Division was the 98th season of top-tier football in Luxembourg. It began on 5 August 2011 and ended on 13 May 2012. F91 Dudelange were the defending champions having won their ninth league championship in the previous season.

== Team changes from 2010–11 ==
Etzella Ettelbruck and Jeunesse Canach were relegated to the Division of Honour after finishing 13th and 14th in the previous season. Jeunesse Canach were relegated after one year in the top flight while Etzella leave after an eight-year stay in the league. They were replaced by 2010–11 Division of Honour champions Union 05 Kayl-Tétange and runners-up Rumelange. Kayl-Tétange are taking part in this competition for the first time in their history, while Rumelange return to the league after a one-year absence.

Wiltz 71 as 12th-placed team had to compete in a single play-off match against 3rd-placed Division of Honour side Hostert. Hostert won the match after a penalty shootout, thus winning promotion to the league for the first time in their history. Meanwhile, Wiltz 71 were relegated after one year in the league.

== Stadia and locations ==
Location of teams in 2011–12 Luxembourg National Division

Team	Venue	Capacity
FC Differdange 03	Stade du Thillenberg	7,830
F91 Dudelange	Stade Jos Nosbaum	2,600
CS Fola Esch	Stade Émile Mayrisch	3,900
CS Grevenmacher	Op Flohr Stadion	4,000
US Hostert	Stade Jos Becker	1,500
Jeunesse Esch	Stade de la Frontière	5,400
UN Käerjeng 97	Stade um Bëschel	1,000
CS Pétange	Stade Municipal (Pétange)	3,300
FC Progrès Niederkorn	Stade Jos Haupert	4,830
Racing FC Union Luxembourg	Stade Achille Hammerel	5,814
FC RM Hamm Benfica	Luxembourg-Cents	2,800
US Rumelange	Stade Municipal (Rumelange)	2,950
FC Swift Hesperange	Stade Alphonse Theis	3,058
Union 05 Kayl-Tétange	Stade Victor Marchal	1,000

== League table ==
Pos	Team	Pld	W	D	L	GF	GA	GD	Pts	Qualification or relegation
1	F91 Dudelange (C)	26	16	6	4	67	20	+47	54	Qualification to Champions League first qualifying round
2	Jeunesse Esch	26	15	6	5	56	37	+19	51	Qualification to Europa League first qualifying round (Note: Since 2011–12 Luxembourg Cup winners and runners-up (F91 Dudelange and Jeunesse Esch) finished first and second respectively, the 2nd, 3rd and 4th-placed teams will enter the first qualifying round of UEFA Europa League.)
3	Grevenmacher	26	14	7	5	50	27	+23	49	Qualification to Europa League first qualifying round
4	Differdange 03	26	13	9	4	64	26	+38	48	Qualification to Europa League first qualifying round
5	UN Käerjeng 97	26	12	7	7	37	35	+2	43	
6	Fola Esch	26	10	8	8	41	30	+11	38	
7	RM Hamm Benfica	26	12	2	12	54	47	+7	38	
8	Pétange	26	10	6	10	29	37	−8	36	
9	Progrès Niederkorn	26	9	6	11	32	35	−3	33	
10	Racing FC	26	7	11	8	40	41	−1	32	
11	Union 05 Kayl-Tétange	26	8	5	13	39	51	−12	29	
12	Swift Hesperange (R)	26	7	5	14	34	53	−19	26	Qualification to Relegation play-offs
13	Rumelange (R)	26	5	4	17	27	71	−44	19	Relegation to Luxembourg Division of Honour
14	US Hostert (R)	26	2	2	22	22	82	−60	8	Relegation to Luxembourg Division of Honour

Source: soccerway.com
Rules for classification: 1) points; 2) goal difference; 3) number of goals scored.
(C) Champions; (R) Relegated

== Results ==
Home \ Away	DIF	DUD	FOL	GRE	HOS	JEU	KÄE	PET	PRO	RAC	RMH	RUM	SWI	UKT
Differdange 03		3–1	2–2	0–0	3–0	0–3	5–0	2–1	2–3	2–2	2–2	6–1	6–1	4–1
F91 Dudelange	1–1		1–0	1–1	3–0	3–3	4–1	10–0	5–0	0–1	1–0	2–0	2–1	2–0
Fola Esch	1–1	1–1		1–2	3–1	1–3	4–0	0–1	1–1	0–0	2–0	0–0	4–1	4–1
Grevenmacher	2–1	0–2	2–1		4–0	1–2	2–0	2–0	1–2	2–1	2–2	2–1	2–0	0–2
US Hostert	0–2	1–9	1–3	0–6		1–6	0–2	0–1	2–5	2–2	1–2	1–0	1–2	0–3
Jeunesse Esch	1–2	2–1	2–0	1–2	3–2		0–0	2–0	2–1	2–2	2–3	1–0	2–1	4–3
UN Käerjeng 97	1–1	0–0	2–3	2–1	3–0	3–0		3–2	0–0	3–2	3–0	2–1	1–0	1–2
Pétange	0–0	0–0	2–1	2–2	3–0	3–0	0–2		0–1	1–1	2–0	0–0	0–3	2–0
Progrès Niederkorn	1–0	1–2	0–1	0–1	0–2	1–1	0–0	1–2		1–2	0–2	4–2	1–0	2–0
Racing FC	1–0	2–0	2–2	1–1	3–3	1–3	1–2	0–0	3–3		3–0	3–1	1–3	3–3
RM Hamm Benfica	1–2	1–4	2–0	1–3	3–1	2–4	2–3	0–4	2–0	4–0		9–1	8–2	1–0
Rumelange	0–7	0–6	1–1	0–5	3–2	1–5	2–0	3–0	2–1	0–3	1–3		3–3	4–1
Swift Hesperange	0–3	0–3	1–2	1–1	1–3	1–1	3–3	3–1	1–0	1–0	1–2	3–0		1–1
Union 05 Kayl-Tétange	2–6	1–3	0–3	3–3	5–0	1–3	0–0	1–2	1–1	2–0	3–2	1–0	2–0	

Source: soccerway.com
Legend: Blue = home team win; Yellow = draw; Red = away team win.

== Relegation play-offs ==
The 12th-placed club in the National Division, Swift Hesperange, competed in a relegation play-off match against the third-placed team from the Division of Honour, Wiltz, for one spot in the following season's competition. Wiltz won the match by 6 goals to 2, and they returned to the top division after a one-year absence. Swift Hesperange were relegated to the Division of Honour after an eleven-year stay in the top division.

17 May 2012
19:00 CEST

Swift Hesperange	2–6	Wiltz

Stade Am Deich, Ettelbruck

== Top goalscorers ==
Rank	Player	Club	Goals
1	(Morocco) Omar Er Rafik	Differdange 03	23
2	(Luxembourg) Daniel Huss	CS Grevenmacher	20
2	(Bosnia and Herzegovina) Sanel Ibrahimović	RM Hamm Benfica	20
4	(Luxembourg) Aurélien Joachim	F91 Dudelange	19
5	(Luxembourg) Stefano Bensi	F91 Dudelange	16
6	(France) Tony Lopes	Union 05 Kayl-Tétange	14
7	(France) Gauthier Caron	Differdange 03	13
7	(France) Johan Carlos Miranda	Swift Hesperange	13
9	(France) Daniel Gomez	Jeunesse Esch	12
9	(France) Nicolas Romero	Racing FC	12

== See also ==
- 2011–12 Luxembourg Cup
