= Sammy Habte =

Eritrean footballer (born 1983)

Personal information
- Full name: Asmeron Habte
- Date of birth: 14 October 1983 (age 41)
- Place of birth: Asmara, Ethiopia
- Height: 1.89 m (6 ft 2 in)
- Position(s): Defender, midfielder

Senior career*
Years	Team	Apps	(Gls)
–2004	Eintracht Trier	1	(0)
2004–2008	Victoria Rosport		
2009–2011	CS Grevenmacher	27	(3)
- DJK St. Matthias Trier
- *Club domestic league appearances and goals

Asmeron Habte (born 14 October 1983) is an Eritrean-German former professional footballer who played as a defender or midfielder.

== Early life ==
Habte moved from the Province of Eritrea to Germany as a child.

== Club career ==
Habte started his career with 2. Bundesliga side Eintracht Trier, where he made one league appearance. On 25 May 2003, he debuted for Eintracht Trier in a 1–0 loss to Union Berlin. After that, he signed for Victoria Rosport in Luxembourg, helping them qualify for the 2005 UEFA Intertoto Cup. After that, he signed for German seventh division club DJK St. Matthias Trier.

== International career ==
Habte is eligible to represent Eritrea internationally.

== Personal life ==
After retiring he worked as a groundskeeper. He also worked as a youth football manager.
