= Sven Di Domenico =

Luxembourgish footballer

Personal information
- Date of birth: 15 March 1982 (age 44)
- Place of birth: Luxembourg
- Position: Midfielder

Senior career*
Years	Team	Apps	(Gls)
2001–2006	Swift Hesperange	124	(46)
2006–2010	CS Grevenmacher	22	(4)
2010–2012	FC RM Hamm Benfica	57	(17)
2012–2015	CS Sanem		

International career^{‡}
2002–2004	Luxembourg	15	(0)
- * Club domestic league appearances and goals as of 27 June 2023 ‡ National team caps and goals as of 14 January 2010

Sven Di Domenico (born 15 March 1982) is a former Luxembourgish footballer who played as a defender in Luxembourg's domestic leagues.
