= Jonathan Zydko =

French footballer (born 1984)

Personal information
- Full name: Jonathan Zydko
- Date of birth: 12 January 1984 (age 42)
- Place of birth: Metz, France
- Height: 1.77 m (5 ft 10 in)
- Position: Defender

Youth career
- 2000–2003: Metz

Senior career*
Years	Team	Apps	(Gls)
2003–2004	Metz	0	(0)
2004–2006	VfR Aalen	30	(0)
2006	1. FC Saarbrücken II	11	(2)
2006–2008	1. FC Saarbrücken	53	(1)
2008–2009	UN Käerjéng 97	20	(1)
2009–2011	1. FC Saarbrücken	54	(1)
2011–2014	UN Käerjéng 97	67	(2)
2014–2015	Jeunesse Esch	36	(1)
2016–2017	Mondercange		
- * Club domestic league appearances and goals

Jonathan Zydko (born 12 January 1984) is a French former footballer. During his career, he played for FC Metz, VfR Aalen, 1. FC Saarbrücken, UN Käerjéng 97, Jeunesse Esch and Mondercange.

== Honours ==
- Regionalliga West (IV): 2010
