= Ricardo Delgado (Luxembourgish footballer) =

Luxembourgish international footballer

Personal information
- Full name: Ricardo Aleixo Delgado
- Date of birth: 22 February 1994 (age 32)
- Position: Centre back

Team information
- Current team: Strassen
- Number: 14

Senior career*
Years	Team	Apps	(Gls)
2010–2019	Jeunesse Esch	166	(8)
2019–2022	F91 Dudelange	51	(3)
2022–2025	Swift Hesperange	55	(4)
2025–	Strassen	7	(0)

International career^{‡}
2015–2017	Luxembourg	10	(0)
- * Club domestic league appearances and goals as of 5 June 2026 ‡ National team caps and goals as of 22 June 2017

Ricardo Aleixo Delgado (born 22 February 1994) is a Luxembourgish international footballer who plays as a defender for Strassen.

== Career ==
He made his international debut for Luxembourg in 2015.

Delgado joined F91 Dudelange for the 2019/20 season.

He moved to Swift Hesperange before the 2022–2023 season.
