= Marc Oberweis =

Luxembourgish footballer

Personal information
- Full name: Marc Oberweis
- Date of birth: 6 November 1982 (age 43)
- Place of birth: Luxembourg City, Luxembourg
- Height: 1.81 m (5 ft 11 1/2 in)
- Position: Goalkeeper

Youth career
- F91 Dudelange

Senior career*
Years	Team	Apps	(Gls)
2002–2004	F91 Dudelange	31	(0)
2004–2008	CS Grevenmacher	108	(0)
2009–2018	Jeunesse Esch	198	(0)

International career^{‡}
2005–2009	Luxembourg	7	(0)
- * Club domestic league appearances and goals as of 7 July 2022 ‡ National team caps and goals as of 1 June 2011

Marc Oberweis (born 6 November 1982) is a retired Luxembourgish footballer who last played as a goalkeeper for Jeunesse Esch in Luxembourg's domestic National Division.

== Club career ==
Oberweis came through the youth ranks at F91 Dudelange where he made his senior debut in 2002. In 2004, he joined Grevenmacher.

== International career ==
Oberweis made his debut for Luxembourg in a March 2005 World Cup qualification match against Latvia, taking the national team jersey over from Alija Besic. He went on to earn 7 caps, 5 of them FIFA World Cup qualification matches.

He also played several Euro League and Champions League Qualification games for his clubs Jeunesse Esch, CS Grevenmacher and F91 Dudelange.

== Honours ==
- Luxembourg Cup: 2

2004, 2008

National Champion 2010 with Jeunesse Esch Elected 3 times best Goalkeeper in BGL Ligue 2nd best player in BGL Ligue in the season 09–10.
