= Helmut Bergfelder =

German footballer

Personal information
- Date of birth: 21 November 1946 (age 79)
- Place of birth: Germany
- Height: 1.87 m (6 ft 1 1/2 in)
- Position: Striker

Youth career
- BC Bliesheim

Senior career*
| Years | Team | Apps | (Gls) |
| 1966–1968 | 1. FC Köln | 1 | (0) |
| 1968–1970 | Bonner SC | | |
| 1970–1976 | Fortuna Köln | 62 | (5) |
| 1976–1981 | Eintracht Trier | 138 | (11) |
- * Club domestic league appearances and goals

Helmut Bergfelder (born 21 November 1946) is a former German footballer.

Bergfelder's career in the Bundesliga was only of a very short duration. On the 31st fixture date of the season in 1967–68, Willi Multhaup, manager of 1. FC Köln gave him the chance to play in a defeat against MSV Duisburg. This remained his only match in the top German league with the "FC", but he was still given the chance to play a complete 90 minutes. In 1973, Bergfelder gained promotion with Fortuna Köln to play further 32 Bundesliga matches.

Bergfelder was very active with the German amateur national team.

== Honours ==
- DFB-Pokal: 1965–66
