= Amodou Abdullei =

Nigerian footballer (born 1987)

Personal information
- Date of birth: 20 December 1987 (age 38)
- Place of birth: Kano, Nigeria
- Height: 1.90 m (6 ft 3 in)
- Position: Forward

Youth career
- Eintracht Trier

Senior career*
Years	Team	Apps	(Gls)
–2007	Eintracht Trier		
2007–2008	SSV Ulm	9	(1)
2008	TSG Thannhausen	2	(0)
2008–2009	SSV Ulm	11	(1)
2010	Beveren	11	(3)
2010–2012	Dudelange	10	(4)
2012–2013	Borussia Neunkirchen		
2014	SV Mehring	13	(7)
2014–2015	UN Käerjéng 97	11	(6)
2015–2016	Cihangir GSK	17	(10)
2017–2018	CS Grevenmacher		
2018–2020	TuS Koblenz	50	(20)
2020	VfR Aalen	0	(0)
2020–2021	Eintracht Trier	7	(5)
- * Club domestic league appearances and goals

Amodou Abdullei (born 20 December 1987) is a Nigerian-German former professional footballer who played as a forward.

== Career ==
=== Early career in Germany ===
Aged 17 Abdullei left a football academy in Nigeria for Norway before joining German club Eintracht Trier where he played in the Under 19 Bundesliga during the 2005–06 season. He moved to SSV Ulm in July 2007, to TSG Thannhausen in February 2008 but in November 2008, he was back at SSV Ulm. In May 2009, it was announced Abdullei would leave the club.

=== Belgium, Luxembourg, and Northern Cyprus ===
Abdullei scored three goals in four games for K.S.K. Beveren through March 2010. He was fined €100 and temporarily suspended for aggressive conduct at Waasland-Beveren, sidelined at home to Dender and traveling to Antwerp. During the 2009–10 Belgian Second Division, he made 11 appearances and scored tree goals.

Abdullei played for F91 Dudelange from 2010 to 2012.

In late September 2012, he moved to German fifth-tier side Borussia Neunkirchen. In March 2014, having been without a club for a year and having trained with Blackpool und bei Charlton Athletic in England, he signed with SV Mehring, also of the Oberliga. He scored twice on his debut.

Abdullei moved to Luxembourg National Division club UN Käerjéng 97 approaching the end of 2014, He put his first goal past Wiltz in their opener.

Having drawn interest from Küçük Kaymaklı Türk S.K., Cihangir GSK, and Bostancı Bağcıl S.K. halfway through September 2015, the then 27-year old starred as Cihangir put three past Baf Ülkü Yurdu S.K., finally settling on the club in advance of the 2015–16 season.

In winter 2016–17 Abdullei returned to Luxembourg with second-tier side CS Grevenmacher and stayed the following season.

=== Return to Germany ===
Abdullei signed for TuS Koblenz, newly relegated to the Oberliga, in summer 2018.

In August 2020, Abdullei returned to Eintracht Trier after 15 years.
