= Yassine Benajiba =

Belgian footballer (born 1984)

Personal information
- Date of birth: November 1, 1984 (age 41)
- Place of birth: France
- Position: Midfielder

Senior career*
Years	Team	Apps	(Gls)
–2006	RE Mouscron	19	(0)
2006–2007	Ethnikos Asteras		
2007	MA Tétouan		
2008	Fath Union Sport		
2008–2009	Royal Cappellen FC	4	(0)
2009–2010	KSK Ronse	11	(0)
2011–2013	Jeunesse Esch	54	(24)
2013–2018	F91 Dudelange	36	(4)
- * Club domestic league appearances and goals

Yassine Benajiba (born 1 November 1984) is a Belgian former footballer.

== Early life ==
Benajiba started his career with Belgian side RE Mouscron. He debuted for the club at the age of seventeen.

== Career ==
In 2006, Benajiba signed for Greek side Ethnikos Asteras. In 2007, he signed for Moroccan side MA Tétouan. In 2008, he signed for Moroccan side Fath Union Sport. After that, he signed for Belgian side Royal Cappellen FC. In 2009, he signed for Belgian side KSK Ronse. In 2011, he signed for Luxembourgish side Jeunesse Esch. He was regarded as one of the club's most important players. In 2013, he signed for Luxembourgish side F91 Dudelange. He was regarded to have initially performed poorly while playing for the club.

== Style of play ==
Benajiba mainly operated as a midfielder. He was nicknamed "Pitbull".

== Personal life ==
Benajiba is a native of Brussels, Belgium. He has a daughter and a son.
