= Sanel Ibrahimović =

Bosnian footballer (born 1987)

Personal information
- Date of birth: 24 November 1987 (age 38)
- Place of birth: Tuzla, SFR Yugoslavia
- Height: 1.80 m (5 ft 11 in)
- Position: Forward

Youth career
- 1993–2003: Sloboda Tuzla

Senior career*
Years	Team	Apps	(Gls)
2009–2011	Wiltz 71	48	(41)
2011–2012	Hamm Benfica	24	(20)
2012–2015	Jeunesse Esch	77	(57)
2015–2019	F91 Dudelange	92	(35)
2019–2022	Wiltz 71	74	(41)
Total		315	(194)
- * Club domestic league appearances and goals

Sanel Ibrahimović (born 24 November 1987) is a Bosnian former footballer who played as a forward.

He spent most of his career in the Luxembourg National Division, with over 200 appearances and 100 goals between four teams. During his time at Jeunesse Esch and F91 Dudelange, he won four each of the league title and Luxembourg Cup. He was the Luxembourgish Footballer of the Year in 2013–14 and the league's top scorer three times.

Despite the surname, he has no relation to Swedish footballer Zlatan Ibrahimović.

== Career ==
Born in Tuzla, then in the SFR Yugoslavia, Ibrahimović was in the youth system of FK Sloboda Tuzla from the age of 6, until at 16 his family moved to Luxembourg. He returned to the Balkans and became a futsal professional in Croatia before returning to Luxembourg in 2008, settling with his family in Wiltz, a northern city with a large Bosnian community.

His first club was FC Wiltz 71 of the second-tier Luxembourg Division of Honour. As a non-European Union citizen, he required a work permit as a specialist to play for the team. The club president, former Luxembourg international Henri Roemer, hired him as a purported specialist in Bosnian cuisine for his hotel – though he had no actual expertise in this field. The team gained promotion, and he was top scorer in the 2010–11 Luxembourg National Division with 18 goals in 24 games. However, the club were relegated and he missed a penalty in their play-off against US Hostert.

Ibrahimović had been tracked by a scout from nearby French club FC Metz, but the game he attended saw Wiltz lose 15–0 to F91 Dudelange, and he joined FC RM Hamm Benfica in 2011 for a club record €35,000, and Jeunesse Esch a year later. In the final of the 2012–13 Luxembourg Cup, he scored twice in a 2–1 win over FC Differdange 03 at the Stade Josy Barthel. In 2013–14, he was again top scorer with 22 goals in 26 games, in addition to Luxembourgish Footballer of the Year. With only one goal fewer the following season, he was top scorer for the third time.

In June 2015, after his Jeunesse contract expired, Ibrahimović moved to F91 Dudelange on a three-year deal.

Ibrahimović was close to returning to Wiltz in January 2019, but stayed at F91 and won the league and cup double. In June that year, he joined Wiltz on a three-year contract. In July 2021, he announced that he would retire from football after the 2021–22 season.

== Honours ==
Jeunesse Esch

- Luxembourg Cup: 2012–13

F91 Dudelange

- Luxembourg National Division: 2015–16, 2016–17, 2017–18, 2018–19
- Luxembourg Cup: 2015–16, 2016–17, 2018–19

Individual

- Luxembourgish Footballer of the Year: 2013–14
- Luxembourg National Division top scorer: 2010–11, 2013–14, 2014–15
