= Luc Thimmesch =

Luxembourgish footballer

Personal information
- Date of birth: 20 September 1980 (age 46)
- Place of birth: Luxembourg
- Position: Midfielder

Team information
- Current team: CS Grevenmacher
- Number: 10

Senior career*
Years	Team	Apps	(Gls)
1998–2002	Union Luxembourg	82	(7)
2002–2010	CS Grevenmacher	98	(20)
2009	→ Etzella Ettelbruck (loan)	9	(1)
2010–2014	US Mondorf-les-Bains		
2017–2019	FC Kopstal		
2019–2020	FC Munsbach		

International career^{‡}
2003–2004	Luxembourg	4	(0)
- * Club domestic league appearances and goals as of 7 July 2022 ‡ National team caps and goals as of 14 January 2010

Luc Thimmesch (born 20 September 1980) is a retired Luxembourgish footballer who played as a midfielder for several clubs in Luxembourg's domestic National Division.
