= SC Steinfort =

Association football club in Luxembourg

FC Stengefort/Steinfort
- Full name: Futtballclub Stengefort
- Founded: 1923; 103 years ago
- Ground: Stade Demy Steichen; Steinfort, Luxembourg
- Capacity: 1,300
- Chairman: Guy Nilles
- Manager: Guy Nilles
- League: 2. Division Series 2
- 2025–26: 2. Division Series 2, 10th of 14
- Website: www.scsteinfort.lu
Home colours

SC Steinfort is a football club from Luxembourg is a football club, based in Steinfort, in western Luxembourg. They currently compete in the 2. Division Series 2, the fourth tier of Luxembourgish football.

== History ==
The club was originally founded in 1923 as FC Steinfort. In 2007, it was renamed to Sporting Club Steinfort due to a partnership with Portuguese side Sporting Lisbon. Since July 2019 it has been known as FC Stengefort, using the Luxembourgish version of the original name.

They spent one season in the Luxembourg National Division (top tier) during the 2008–09 season.

== Staff ==
Coach	(Portugal) Augusto Martins
Assistant coach	(Portugal) Abel Mendes
Assistant coach	(France) Emmanuel Vallance
Keeper coach	(Portugal) Felipe Couto Machado
