= FC Erpeldange 72 =

Association football club in Luxembourg

FC 72 Erpeldange
- Full name: Football Club 72 Erpeldange
- Founded: 8 October 1972; 54 years ago
- Ground: Stade An Der Trell, Erpeldange-sur-Sûre
- Capacity: 1,000
- Chairman: Abbes Reeff
- Manager: Elvedin Skrijelj
- League: 1. Division Series 1
- 2025–26: 2. Division Series 1, 1st of 14 (promoted)
- Website: www.fc72.lu

Football Club 72 Ierpeldeng or FC 72 Erpeldange is a football club, based in Erpeldange, in north-eastern Luxembourg.

Erpeldange currently compete in the 1. Division Series 1, the third tier of Luxembourgish football. Their home games are played at the Stade An Der Trell.

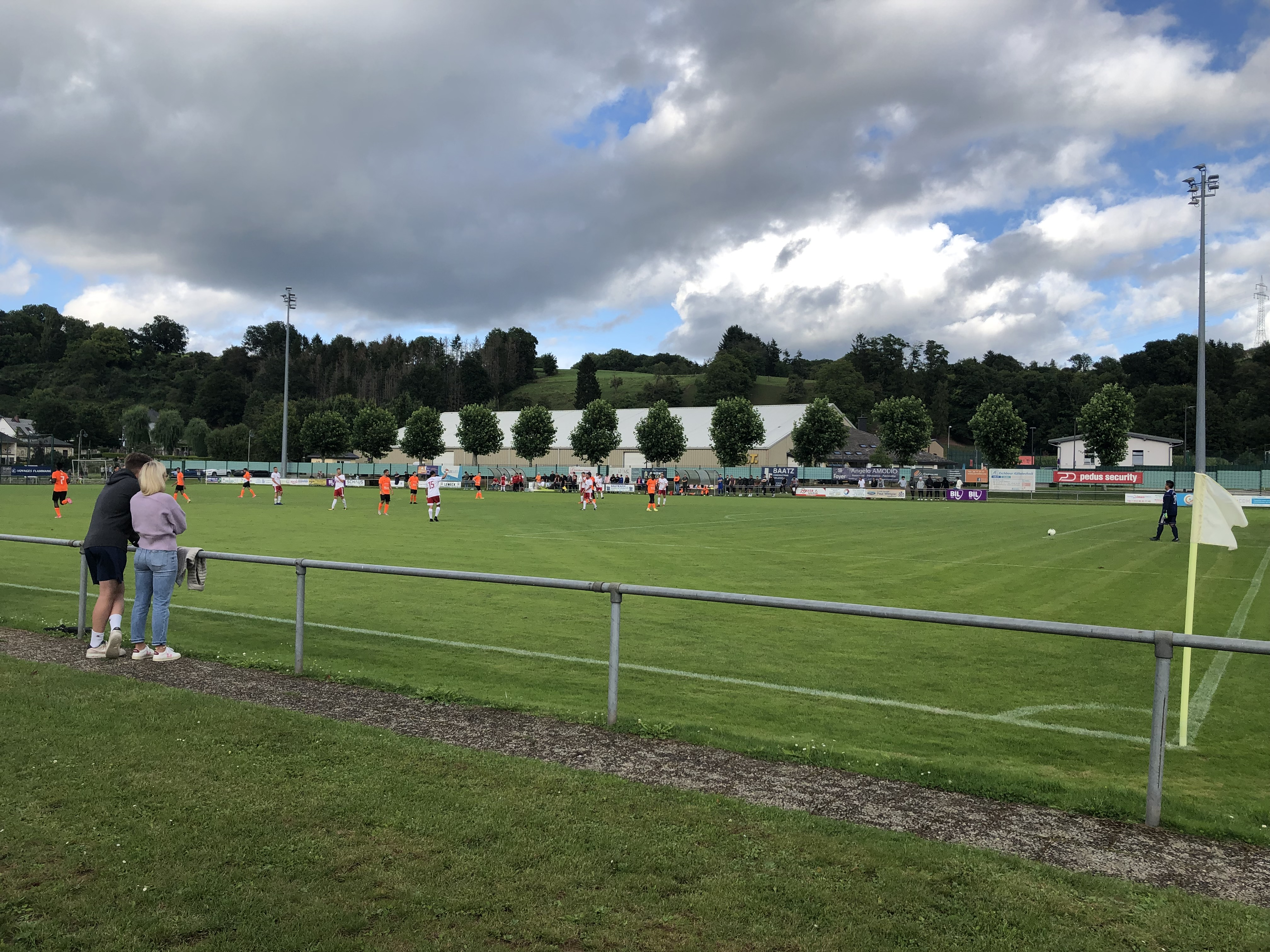
Stade an der Trell, Erpeldange-sur-Sûre
