= Stade um Bëchel =

Football stadium in Hautcharage, Luxembourg

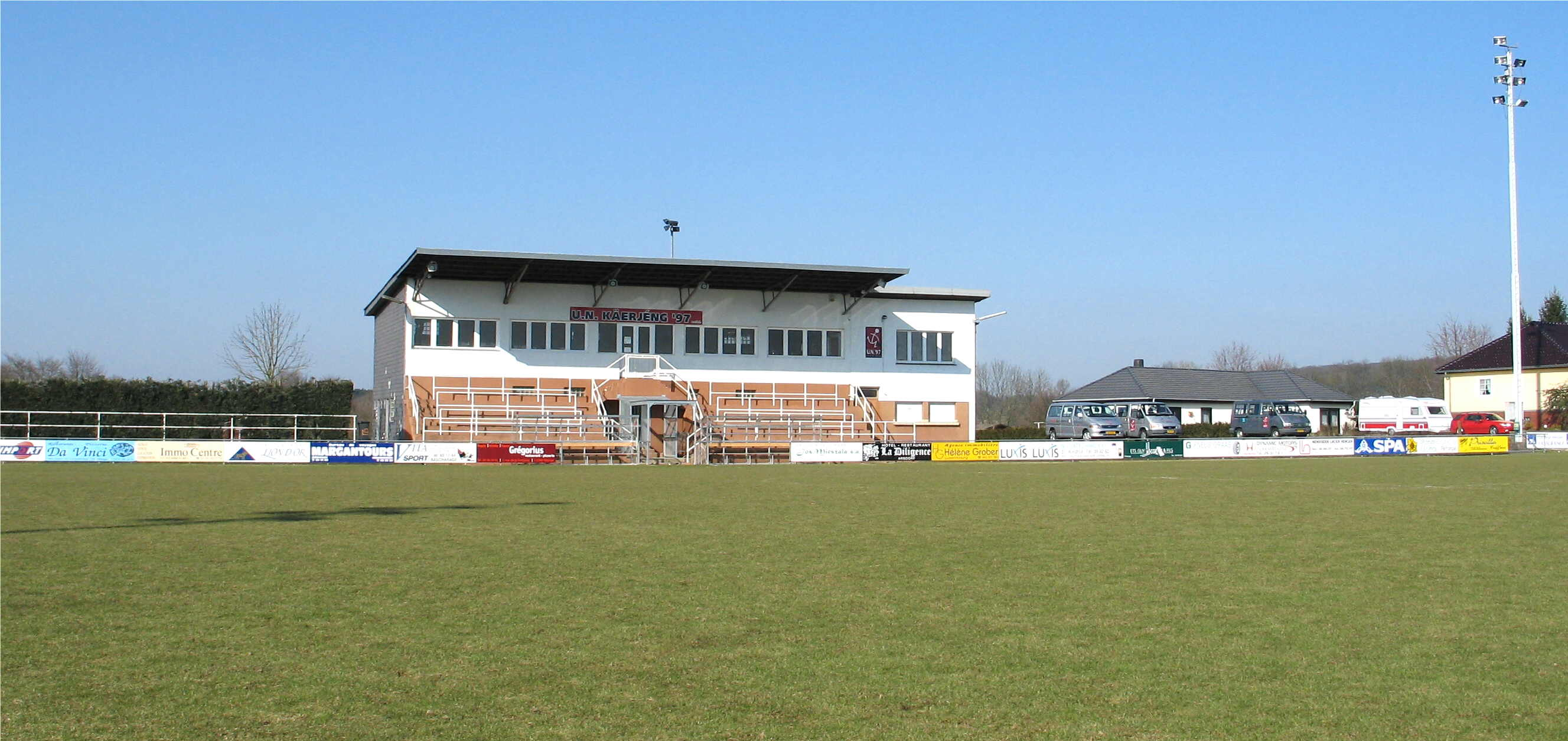
- Stade um Bëchel, Hautcharage, Luxembourg
- Interactive map of Stade um Bëchel
- Full name: Stade um Bëchel
- Location: Hautcharage, Luxembourg
- Coordinates: 49.5742°N 5.9168°E
- Capacity: 1,000
- Surface: grass

Stade um Bëchel was a football stadium in Hautcharage, in south-western Luxembourg.

Until 2011 it was the home stadium of UN Käerjeng 97. The stadium had a capacity of 1,000.
