= Football at the 1952 Summer Olympics – Men's team squads =

The following squads were named for the 1952 Summer Olympics tournament.

== Austria ==
Head coach: Viktor Hierländer

Pos.	Player	DoB	Age	Caps	Club	Tournament games	Tournament goals	Minutes played	Sub off	Sub on	Cards yellow/red
FW	Franz Feldinger	August 22, 1928	23	?	SV Austria Salzburg	2	0	180	–	–	–
MF	Robert Fendler	February 26, 1921	31	?	(Austria) Villacher SV	2	0	180	–	–	–
FW	Otto Gollnhuber	February 9, 1924	28	?	(Austria) Kapfenberger SV	2	2	180	–	–	–
FW	Herbert Grohs	May 4, 1931	21	?	(Austria) Grazer SC	2	2	180	–	–	–
FW	Hermann Hochleitner	October 17, 1925	26	?	(Austria) Salzburger AK 1914	2	0	180	–	–	–
DF	Walter Kollmann	June 17, 1932	20	?	(Austria) Wacker Wien	2	0	180	–	–	–
DF	Anton Krammer	March 14, 1921	31	?	(Austria) Union FC Salzburg	2	0	180	–	–	–
GK	Fritz Nikolai	September 9, 1925	26	?	(Austria) 1. SVg Guntramsdorf	2	0	180	–	–	–
FW	Erich Stumpf	May 22, 1927	25	?	(Austria) Sturm Graz	2	1	180	–	–	–
MF	Josef Walter	October 27, 1925	26	?	(Austria) First Vienna FC	2	0	180	–	–	–
MF	Anton Wolf	April 21, 1933	19	?	(Austria) Sturm Graz	2	0	180	–	–	–
	Stand-by players -
MF	Friedrich Csulem			?	(Austria) Heiligenstädter SV	0	0	0	–	–	–
DF	Ernst Kolar			?	(Austria) ASV Hohenau	0	0	0	–	–	–
GK	Rudolf Krammer	March 7, 1929	23	?	SV Austria Salzburg	0	0	0	–	–	–
FW	Harry Rauch			?	(Austria) Sturm Graz	0	0	0	–	–	–
FW	Hermann Sühs			?	(Austria) SV Gloggnitz	0	0	0	–	–	–

Hans Arnold, A. Rouschal, Johann Weiß and Erwin Theuerweckl were all named in Austria's squad, but did not play in any matches:

== Brazil ==
Head coach: Newton Cardoso

Pos.	Player	DoB	Age	Caps	Club	Tournament games	Tournament goals	Minutes played	Sub off	Sub on	Cards yellow/red
MF	Adésio	January 12, 1933	19	?	(Brazil) Vasco da Gama	3	0	300	0	0	0
GK	Carlos Alberto	January 25, 1932	20	?	(Brazil) Vasco da Gama	3	0	300	0	0	0
MF	Édson	August 12, 1930	21	?	(Brazil) Bangu	3	0	300	0	0	0
FW	Evaristo	June 22, 1933	19	?	(Brazil) Madureira	1	0	120	0	0	0
FW	Humberto	February 4, 1934	18	?	(Brazil) São Cristóvão	3	2	300	0	0	0
FW	Jansen	July 10, 1927	25	?	(Brazil) Vasco da Gama	3	1	300	0	0	0
FW	Larry	November 3, 1932	19	?	(Brazil) Fluminense	3	4	300	0	0	0
DF	Mauro	1932		?	(Brazil) Fluminense	3	0	300	0	0	0
FW	Milton Pessanha	November 11, 1932	19	?	(Brazil) Fluminense	3	0	300	0	0	0
FW	Vavá	November 12, 1934	17	?	(Brazil) Vasco da Gama	2	1	180	0	0	0
DF	Waldir	June 3, 1925	27	?	(Brazil) Bonsucesso	3	0	300	0	0	0
DF	Zózimo	June 19, 1932	20	?	(Brazil) Bangu	3	1	300	0	0	0

Evaristo, Arízio, Bené, Amaury, Antoninho, Paulinho, Wassil, Marcílio Guerra and Cacá were all named in Brazil's squad, but did not play in any matches:

== Bulgaria ==
Head coach: Krum Milev

Pos.	Player	DoB	Age	Caps	Club	Tournament games	Tournament goals	Minutes played	Sub off	Sub on	Cards yellow/red
DF	Boris Apostolov	January 20, 1925		?	(Bulgaria) Spartak Sofia
FW	Petar Argirov	February 19, 1923		?	(Bulgaria) Lokomotiv Sofia
MF	Stefan Bozhkov	September 20, 1923	28	?	(Bulgaria) CSKA Sofia
DF	Georgi Eftimov	March 24, 1931	21	?	(Bulgaria) Lokomotiv Sofia
FW	Ivan Kolev	November 1, 1930	21	?	(Bulgaria) CSKA Sofia
DF	Manol Manolov	October 22, 1926	25	?	(Bulgaria) CSKA Sofia
FW	Dimitar Milanov	October 18, 1928	23	?	(Bulgaria) CSKA Sofia
FW	Panayot Panayotov	December 30, 1930	21	?	(Bulgaria) CSKA Sofia
GK	Apostol Sokolov	October 23, 1917	34	?	(Bulgaria) Spartak Sofia
FW	Krum Yanev	January 9, 1929	23	?	(Bulgaria) CSKA Sofia
MF	Traycho Petkov	September 4, 1923	28	?	(Bulgaria) Lokomotiv Sofia

Gavril Stoyanov, Minko Minchev, Ivan Nikolov, Todor Kapralov, Atanas Tsanov, Lazar Hristov, Ivan Trendafilov, Georgi Kekemanov and Kostadin Blagoev were all named in Bulgaria's squad, but did not play in any matches:

== Chile ==
Head coach: Luis Tirado

Pos.	Player	DoB	Age	Caps	Club	Tournament games	Tournament goals	Minutes played	Sub off	Sub on	Cards yellow/red
	Justo Albornoz	January 29, 1926	26	?	(Chile) Naval de Talcahuano
	José Bravo			?	(Chile) Naval de Talcahuano
	José García Quesada	May 7, 1931	21	?	(Chile) Naval de Talcahuano
	Rubén González	December 5, 1927	24	?	(Chile) Naval de Talcahuano
	Fernando Jara	August 9, 1930	21	?	(Chile) Universidad Católica
	Irenio Jara	December 13, 1929	22	?	(Chile) Minas Lota
	Luis Leal	July 21, 1929	23	?	(Chile) Naval de Talcahuano
GK	Sergio Litvak	October 17, 1927	22	?	(Chile) Universidad Católica
	Domingo Massaro	August 28, 1927	24	?	(Chile) Seleccion Iquique
	Arturo Nourdin	August 16, 1927	25	?	(Chile) Naval de Talcahuano
	Domingo Pillado	January 25, 1928	24	?	(Chile) Naval de Talcahuano
GK	Manuel Roa	April 2, 1929	23	?	(Chile) Naval de Talcahuano
FW	Ernesto Saavedra	July 14, 1924	28	?	(Chile) Naval de Talcahuano
	Jaime Vásquez	August 22, 1929	22	?	(Chile) Universidad Católica
	Osvaldo Vera			?	(Chile) Naval de Talcahuano
	Julio Vial	July 1, 1933	19	?	(Chile) Colo-Colo

== Denmark ==
Head coach: Axel Bjerregaard

Pos.	Player	DoB	Age	Caps	Club	Tournament games	Tournament goals	Minutes played	Sub off	Sub on	Cards yellow/red
MF	Poul Andersen	February 16, 1928	24	?	(Denmark) B 93	3	0	270	–	–	–
FW	Søren Andersen	December 19, 1925	28	?	(Denmark) Esbjerg fB	2	0	180	–	–	–
MF	Steen Blicher	November 22, 1923	28	?	(Denmark) AB	3	0	270	–	–	–
FW	Jens Peter Hansen	March 15, 1927	25	?	(Denmark) Esbjerg fB	3	1	270	–	–	–
FW	Jørgen W. Hansen	September 15, 1925	26	?	(Denmark) KB	3	0	270	–	–	–
GK	Jørgen Johansen	February 24, 1928	24	?	(Denmark) KB	3	0	270	–	–	–
FW	Knud Lundberg	May 14, 1920	32	?	(Denmark) AB	3	1	270	–	–	–
DF	Svend Nielsen	November 20, 1928	23	?	(Denmark) B 93	3	1	270	–	–	–
DF	Poul Petersen	April 11, 1921	31	?	(Denmark) AB	1	0	90	–	–	–
FW	Poul Erik Petersen	May 7, 1927	25	?	(Denmark) Køge BK	3	2	270	–	–	–
FW	Holger Seebach	March 17, 1922	30	?	(Denmark) AB	3	2	270	–	–	–
MF	Erik Terkelsen	July 3, 1926	26	?	(Denmark) Esbjerg fB	3	0	270	–	–	–
	Stand-by players -
GK	Henry From	June 1, 1926	26	?	(Denmark) AGF	0	0	0	–	–	–
MF	Ralf Ginsborg	April 11, 1927	25	?	(Denmark) HIK	0	0	0	–	–	–
FW	Carl Holm	September 14, 1927	24	?	(Denmark) B 1903	0	0	0	–	–	–
FW	Aage Rou Jensen	September 24, 1924	27	?	(Denmark) AGF	0	0	0	–	–	–
DF	Knud Blak Jensen	August 10, 1925	26	?	(Denmark) KB	0	0	0	–	–	–
DF	Per Knudsen	June 2, 1925	27	?	(Denmark) AGF	0	0	0	–	–	–
MF	Jørgen Olesen	January 21, 1924	28	?	(Denmark) AGF	0	0	0	–	–	–
FW	Jens Torstensen	November 11, 1928	23	?	(Denmark) Odense KFUM	0	0	0	–	–	–

== Egypt ==
Head coach: (England) Edward Jones

Pos.	Player	DoB	Age	Caps	Club	Tournament games	Tournament goals	Minutes played	Sub off	Sub on	Cards yellow/red
	Hamza Abdel Mawla	October 26, 1923	28	?
	Hanafy Bastan	December 6, 1923	28	?	(Egypt) Zamalek
	Elsayed Eldizwi	1926		?	(Egypt) Al-Masry
	Sharif El-Far	January 5, 1929	23	?	(Egypt) Zamalek
	Alaa El-Hamouly	July 4, 1930		?	(Egypt) Zamalek
	Moussa Mohamed	1925		?
GK	Abdel Galil Hamza	December 8, 1923	28	?
	Mohamed Kabil	March 14, 1927	25	?
	Sayed Mohamed	March 23, 1920	32	?
	Ahmed Rashed	November 20, 1928	23	?
	Fouad Sidky	October 24, 1925	26	?
	Ahmed Mekkawi	March 5, 1923	29	?

Ahmed Katou, Nour El-Dali, Mohammed Abdallah, Fahmi Jemei, Ibrahim Saleh, Ad-Diba, Essam Baheeg and El-Sayed El-Attiyah were all named in Egypt's squad, but did not play in any matches:

== Finland ==
Head coach: Aatos Lehtonen

Pos.	Player	DoB	Age	Caps	Club	Tournament games	Tournament goals	Minutes played	Sub off	Sub on	Cards yellow/red
MF	Veikko Asikainen	April 18, 1918	34	?	(Finland) Valkeakosken Haka	1	0	90	–	–	–
MF	Erik Beijar	May 12, 1921	31	?	(Finland) Vasa IFK	1	0	90	–	–	–
GK	Olavi Laaksonen	July 26, 1921	31	?	(Finland) Turun Palloseura	1	0	90	–	–	–
FW	Kalevi Lehtovirta	February 20, 1928	24	?	(Finland) Turun Pyrkivä	1	0	90	–	–	–
DF	Åke Lindman	January 11, 1928	24	?	(Finland) HIFK	1	0	90	–	–	–
DF	Stig-Göran Myntti	August 6, 1925	26	?	(Finland) Vasa IFK	1	0	90	–	–	–
FW	Nils Rikberg	March 29, 1928	24	?	(Finland) Kotkan Jäntevä	1	0	90	–	–	–
FW	Aulis Rytkönen	January 5, 1929	23	?	(Finland) KuPS	1	1	90	–	–	–
FW	Olof Stolpe	April 18, 1927	25	?	(Finland) Vasa IFK	1	2	90	–	–	–
FW	Jorma Vaihela	September 30, 1925	27	?	(Finland) RU-38 Pori	1	0	90	–	–	–
MF	Esko Valkama	December 21, 1924	27	?	(Finland) Ilves-Kissat	1	0	90	–	–	–
	Stand-by players -
FW	Rainer Forss	October 20, 1930	21	?	(Finland) Turun Pyrkivä	0	0	0	–	–	–
FW	Kalevi Lilja	September 10, 1925	26	?	(Finland) Ilves-Kissat	0	0	0	–	–	–
DF	Kurt Martin	Маr 13, 1923	29	?	(Finland) Vasa IFK	0	0	0	–	–	–
DF	Sulo Parkkinen	April 21, 1930	22	?	(Finland) KTP, Kotka	0	0	0	–	–	–
MF	Seppo Pelkonen	April 13, 1930	22	?	(Finland) KuPS	0	0	0	–	–	–
MF	Åke Pettersson	March 20, 1926	26	?	(Finland) Kotkan Jäntevä	0	0	0	–	–	–
GK	Mauno Rintanen	April 28, 1925	27	?	(Finland) Vaasan Palloseura	0	0	0	–	–	–
DF	Tapio Pylkkönen	February 6, 1923	29	?	(Finland) Helsingin Ponnistus	0	0	0	–	–	–

== France ==
Head coach: Louis Dugauguez

Pos.	Player	DoB	Age	Caps	Club	Tournament games	Tournament goals	Minutes played	Sub off	Sub on	Cards yellow/red
MF	Jacques Barreau	21 January 1923	29	?	(France) RC Paris	1	0	90	–	–	–
DF	Lucien Bochard	10 August 1925	26	?	(France) UA Sedan-Torcy	1	0	90	–	–	–
FW	Jacques Bohée	16 August 1929	22	?	(France) CO Roubaix-Tourcoing	1	0	90	–	–	–
DF	Roger Colliot	2 September 1925	26	?	(France) CO Roubaix-Tourcoing	1	0	90	–	–	–
GK	Léonce Deprez	10 July 1927	25	?	(France) Stade Béthunois FC	1	0	90	–	–	–
MF	Jean-Claude Druart	25 August 1927	24	?	Racing Club de France	1	0	90	–	–	–
MF	Albert Eloy	30 June 1927	25	?	(France) UA Sedan-Torcy	1	0	90	–	–	–
FW	Michel Leblond	10 May 1932	20	?	(France) Stade de Reims	1	1	90	–	–	–
FW	Bernard Lefèvre	22 June 1930	22	?	(France) Lille OSC	1	0	90	–	–	–
FW	Célestin Oliver	12 July 1930	22	?	(France) Ideal Mostaganem	1	0	90	–	–	–
FW	René Persillon	16 June 1919	33	?	(France) FC Girondins de Bordeaux	1	0	90	–	–	–
	Stand-by players -
GK	Jean-Guy Astresses	24 June 1929	23	?	(France) FC Girondins de Bordeaux	0	0	0	–	–	–
FW	René Bliard	18 October 1932	19	?	(France) Stade de Reims	0	0	0	–	–	–
	M. Braucheil			?		0	0	0	–	–	–
FW	Paul Carrier	4 March 1930	22	?	(France) FC Grenoble	0	0	0	–	–	–
DF	Jean Demaria	27 August 1933	18	?	(France) Hyères FC	0	0	0	–	–	–
MF	Joseph Ibáñez	21 January 1927	25	?	(France) AS Saint-Étienne	0	0	0	–	–	–
DF	Mustapha Zitouni	19 October 1928	23	?	(France) AS Cannes	0	0	0	–	–	–

== Germany ==
Head coach: Sepp Herberger

Pos.	Player	DoB	Age	Caps	Club	Tournament games	Tournament goals	Minutes played	Sub off	Sub on	Cards yellow/red
DF	Hans Eberle	September 28, 1925	26	?	(West Germany) SSV Ulm 1846	4	0	390	–	–	–
FW	Kurt Ehrmann	June 7, 1922	30	?	(West Germany) Karlsruher FV	2	0	180	–	–	–
MF	Erich Gleixner	April 1, 1920	32	?	(West Germany) VfL Osnabrück	2	0	180	–	–	–
FW	Ludwig Hinterstocker	April 11, 1931	21	?	(West Germany) FC Traunstein	2	0	210	–	–	–
DF	Herbert Jäger	February 15, 1926	26	?	(West Germany) Cronenberger SC	4	0	390	–	–	–
FW	Karl Klug	April 8, 1925	27	?	(West Germany) Spielvereinigung Sterkrade 06/07	2	2	210	–	–	–
FW	Matthias Mauritz	November 13, 1924	27	?	(West Germany) Fortuna Düsseldorf	2	0	180	–	–	–
DF	Alfred Post	August 20, 1926	25	?	(West Germany) Rheydter Spielverein	3	0	300	–	–	–
MF	Herbert Schäfer	August 16, 1927	24	?	(West Germany) Sportfreunde Siegen	4	0	390	–	–	–
GK	Rudolf Schönbeck	August 3, 1919	32	?	(West Germany) FC St. Pauli	4	0	390	–	–	–
FW	Willi Schröder	December 28, 1928	23	?	(West Germany) ATSV 1860 Bremen	4	4	390	–	–	–
MF	Kurt Sommerlatt	December 25, 1928	23	?	(West Germany) Karlsruher FC Phönix	4	0	390	–	–	–
FW	Georg Stollenwerk	December 19, 1930	21	?	(West Germany) Düren 99	4	1	390	–	–	–
FW	Johann Zeitler	April 30, 1927	25	?	(West Germany) VfB Bayreuth	3	1	300	–	–	–
	Stand-by players -
GK	Josef Bensch	June 29, 1920	32	?	(West Germany) TuS Lübbecke	0	0	0	–	–	–
MF	Georg Bogert	September 11, 1928	23	?	(West Germany) VfR Wormatia Worms	0	0	0	–	–	–
MF	Walter Brech	January 31, 1927	25	?	(West Germany) TuS Konz	0	0	0	–	–	–
MF	Hannes Kirk	March 3, 1924	28	?	(West Germany) SV Werder Bremen	0	0	0	–	–	–
GK	Gert Schuster			?	(West Germany) 1. FC Eislingen	0	0	0	–	–	–
DF	Heinz Wittig	December 21, 1921	30	?	(West Germany) VfL Neustadt bei Coburg	0	0	0	–	–	–

== Great Britain ==
Head coach: Walter Winterbottom

Pos.	Player	DoB	Age	Caps	Club	Tournament games	Tournament goals	Minutes played	Sub off	Sub on	Cards yellow/red
GK	Edward Bennett	August 22, 1925	26	?	(England) Southall F.C.	1	0	120	–	–	–
MF	Charles Fuller	May 25, 1919	33	?	(England) Bromley F.C.	1	0	120	–	–	–
FW	Bob Hardisty	December 1, 1921	30	?	(England) Bishop Auckland F.C.	1	0	120	–	–	–
FW	James Lewis	June 26, 1927	25	?	(England) Walthamstow Avenue F.C.	1	1	120	–	–	–
FW	Alfred Noble	September 18, 1924	27	?	(England) Blackburn Rovers F.C.	1	0	120	–	–	–
FW	George Robb	June 1, 1926	26	?	(England) Finchley F.C.	1	1	120	–	–	–
MF	Derek Saunders	January 6, 1928	24	?	(England) Walthamstow Avenue F.C.	1	0	120	–	–	–
FW	William Slater	April 29, 1927	25	?	(England) Brentford F.C.	1	1	120	–	–	–
DF	Thomas Stewart	March 11, 1926	26	1	(Scotland) Queen's Park F.C.	1	0	120	–	–	–
DF	Leslie Stratton	April 10, 1925	27	?	(England) Walthamstow Avenue F.C.	1	0	120	–	–	–
MF	Lawrence Topp	November 11, 1923	28	?	(England) Hendon F.C.	1	0	120	–	–	–
	Stand-by players -
GK	Robert Brown			?	(England) Pegasus A.F.C.	0	0	0	–	–	–
DF	Stan Charlton	June 28, 1929	23	?	(England) Bromley F.C.	0	0	0	–	–	–
FW	Derek Grierson	October 5, 1931	21		(Scotland) Queen's Park F.C.	0	0	0	–	–	–
MF	Willie Hastie			?	(Scotland) Queen's Park F.C.	0	0	0	–	–	–
FW	Bill Holmes			?	(England) Blackburn Rovers F.C.	0	0	0	–	–	–
DF	Ken Yenson			?	(England) Leyton F.C.	0	0	0	–	–	–
FW	Kevin McGarry	1925		?	(Northern Ireland) Cliftonville F.C.	0	0	0	–	–	–
FW	Tony Pawson			?	(England) Pegasus A.F.C.	0	0	0	–	–	–
MF	Idwal Robling			?	(Wales) Lovells Athletic F.C.	0	0	0	–	–	–

== Greece ==
Head coach: Antonis Migiakis

Pos.	Player	YoB	Age	Caps	Club	Tournament games	Tournament goals	Minutes played	Sub off	Sub on	Cards yellow/red
MF	Thanasis Bebis (C)	1930	22	17	(Greece) Olympiacos	1	0	90	–	–	–
FW	Georgios Darivas	1927	25	16	(Greece) Olympiacos	1	0	90	–	–	–
FW	Babis Drosos	1927	25	8	(Greece) Olympiacos	1	0	90	–	–	–
FW	Pavlos Emmanouilidis	1929	23	12	(Greece) AEK Athens	1	1	90	–	–	–
DF	Youlielmos Arvanitis	1920	31	5	(Greece) AEK Athens	1	0	90	–	–	–
MF	Ioannis Ioannou	1931	21	12	(Greece) Ethnikos Piraeus	1	0	90	–	–	–
DF	Kostas Linoxilakis	March 5, 1933	19	28	(Greece) Panathinaikos	1	0	90	–	–	–
FW	Ilias Papageorgiou	1925	27	12	(Greece) AEK Athens	1	0	90	–	–	–
GK	Nikos Pentzaropoulos	1927	25	11	(Greece) Panionios	1	0	90	–	–	–
MF	Kostas Poulis	1928	24	9	(Greece) AEK Athens	1	0	90	–	–	–
DF	Ilias Rosidis	1927	25	29	(Greece) Olympiacos	1	0	90	–	–	–
	Stand-by players -
GK	Michalis Delavinias	1921		?	(Greece) AEK Athens	0	0	0	–	–	–
MF	Babis Kotridis	1928		?	(Greece) Olympiacos	0	0	0	–	–	–
DF	Andreas Mouratis	November 29, 1926	25	?	(Greece) Olympiacos	0	0	0	–	–	–
FW	Panagiotis Patakas	1926		?	(Greece) AEK Athens	0	0	0	–	–	–
FW	Vasilis "Lakis" Petropoulos	August 29, 1932	19	?	(Greece) Panathinaikos	0	0	0	–	–	–

== Hungary ==
Head coach: Gusztáv Sebes

Pos.	Player	DoB	Age	Caps	Club	Tournament games	Tournament goals	Minutes played	Sub off	Sub on	Cards yellow/red
MF	József Bozsik	November 28, 1925	26	?	(Hungary) Budapest Honvéd FC	5	1	450	–	–	–
MF	László Budai	July 19, 1928	24	?	(Hungary) Budapest Honvéd FC	1	0	90	–	–	–
DF	Jenő Buzánszky	May 4, 1925	27	?	(Hungary) Dorogi Bányász	4	0	360	–	–	–
FW	Lajos Csordás	October 6, 1932	19	?	(Hungary) Vasas SC	2	0	180	–	–	–
FW	Zoltán Czibor	August 23, 1929	22	?	(Hungary) Csepel SC	4	2	360	–	–	–
DF	Jenő Dálnoki	December 12, 1932	19	?	(Hungary) Ferencvárosi TC	1	0	90	–	–	–
GK	Gyula Grosics	February 4, 1926	26	?	(Hungary) Budapest Honvéd FC	5	0	450	–	–	–
FW	Nándor Hidegkuti	March 3, 1922	30	?	(Hungary) MTK Hungária FC	4	1	360	–	–	1 yel./
FW	Sándor Kocsis	September 21, 1929	22	?	(Hungary) Budapest Honvéd FC	5	6	447	–	–	/1red
MF	Imre Kovács	November 26, 1921	30	?	(Hungary) MTK Hungária FC	1	0	90	–	–	–
DF	Mihály Lantos	September 29, 1928	23	?	(Hungary) MTK Hungária FC	5	1	450	–	–	–
MF	Gyula Lóránt	February 6, 1923	29	?	(Hungary) Budapest Honvéd FC	5	0	450	–	–	–
FW	Péter Palotás	June 27, 1929	23	?	(Hungary) MTK Hungária FC	4	4	360	–	–	–
FW	Ferenc Puskás	April 2, 1927	25	?	(Hungary) Budapest Honvéd FC	5	4	450	–	–	–
MF	József Zakariás	March 25, 1924	28	?	(Hungary) MTK Hungária FC	4	0	360	–	–	–
	Stand-by players -
MF	János Börzsei	October 9, 1921	30	?	(Hungary) Újpest FC	0	0	0	–	–	–
GK	Sándor Gellér	July 12, 1925	27	?	(Hungary) MTK Hungária FC	0	0	0	–	–	–
GK	Géza Henni	1926		?	(Hungary) Újpest FC	0	0	0	–	–	–
MF	Ferenc Szojka	1931		?	(Hungary) Salgótarjáni BTC	0	0	0	–	–	–
FW	János Varga	May 19, 1932	20	?	(Hungary) Dorogi FC	0	0	0	–	–	–

== India ==
Head coach: S. A. Rahim

Pos.	Player	DoB	Age	Caps	Club	Tournament games	Tournament goals	Minutes played	Sub off	Sub on	Cards yellow/red
FW	Ahmed Mohammed Khan	December 24, 1926	25	?	(India) East Bengal	1	1	90	–	–	–
GK	Berland Anthony	1923		?	(India) East Bengal	1	0	90	–	–	–
FW	Joseph Anthony	1925		?	(India) East Bengal	1	0	90	–	–	–
DF	Sayed Khwaja Aziz-ud-Din	July 12, 1930	22	?	(India) Hyderabad City Police	1	0	90	–	–	–
MF	Sheikh Abdul Latif	August 15, 1928	23	?	(India) Mohammedan Sporting Club	1	0	90	–	–	–
DF	Sailendra Nath Manna	September 1, 1924	27	?	(India) Mohun Bagan A.C.	1	0	90	–	–	–
FW	Sayed Moinuddin	1924		?	(India) Hyderabad City Police	1	0	90	–	–	–
FW	Madar Abdus Sattar	1925		?	(India) East Bengal	1	0	90	–	–	–
MF	Thulukhanam Shunmugham	June 19, 1920	32	?	(India) Mysore	1	0	90	–	–	–
MF	Chandan Singh Rawat	July 26, 1926	26	?	(India) Mohun Bagan A.C.	1	0	90	–	–	–
FW	Padanttom Venkatesh	1926		?	(India) East Bengal	1	0	90	–	–	–
	Stand-by players -
FW	Sahu Mewalal	July 1, 1926		?	(India) East Bengal	0	0	0	–	–	–
MF	Muhammad Noor	1925		?	(India) Hyderabad City Police	0	0	0	–	–	–
MF	Subhash Sarbadhikari			?	(India) East Bengal	0	0	0	–	–	–
GK	Kenchappa Varadaraj	1923		?	(India) Mysore	0	0	0	–	–	–

Byomkesh Bose, Samir Roy, P. B. A. Saleh and Runu Guha Thakurta were all named in India's squad, but did not play in any matches:

== Italy ==
Head coach: Giuseppe Meazza

Pos.	Player	DoB	Age	Caps	Club	Tournament games	Tournament goals	Minutes played	Sub off	Sub on	Cards yellow/red
DF	Giovanni Azzini	September 28, 1929	22	?	(Italy) Brescia Calcio	1	0	90	–	–	–
GK	Ottavio Bugatti	September 25, 1928	23	?	(Italy) SPAL 1907	2	0	180	–	–	–
MF	Giancarlo Cadé	February 27, 1930	22	?	(Italy) Atalanta BC.	1	0	90	–	–	–
DF	Giuseppe Corradi	July 7, 1932	20	?	(Italy) Juventus FC	2	0	180	–	–	–
FW	Alberto Fontanesi	March 10, 1929	23	?	(Italy) SPAL 1907	2	1	180	–	–	–
MF	Aredio Gimona	January 2, 1924	28	?	(Italy) U.S. Città di Palermo	2	3	180	–	–	–
FW	Francesco La Rosa	December 9, 1926	25	?	(Italy) Pro Patria	2	0	180	–	–	–
MF	Amos Mariani	March 30, 1931	21	?	(Italy) Udinese Calcio	2	1	180	–	–	–
MF	Maino Neri	June 30, 1924	28	?	(Italy) Inter	2	0	180	–	–	–
MF	Egisto Pandolfini	February 19, 1926	26	?	(Italy) ACF Fiorentina	2	2	180	–	–	–
DF	Battista Rota	July 18, 1932	20	?	(Italy) Atalanta BC.	2	0	180	–	–	–
MF	Arcadio Venturi	May 18, 1929	23	?	(Italy) A.S. Roma	2	1	180	–	–	–
	Stand-by players -
MF	Pietro Biagioli	August 25, 1929	22	?	(Italy) Atletico Piombino	0	0	0	–	–	–
FW	Giampiero Boniperti	July 4, 1928	24	?	(Italy) Juventus FC	0	0	0	–	–	–
MF	Amos Cardarelli	March 6, 1930	22	?	(Italy) A.S. Roma	0	0	0	–	–	–
MF	Rino Ferrario	December 7, 1926	25	?	(Italy) Juventus FC	0	0	0	–	–	–
GK	Anselmo Giorcelli	December 31, 1928	23	?	(Italy) A.C. Monza Brianza 1912	0	0	0	–	–	–
GK	Roberto Lovati	June 20, 1927	25	?	(Italy) A.C. Pisa 1909	0	0	0	–	–	–
MF	Corrado Viciani	December 3, 1929	22	?	(Italy) ACF Fiorentina	0	0	0	–	–	–
FW	Pasquale Vivolo	January 6, 1928	24	?	(Italy) Juventus FC	0	0	0	–	–	-

== Luxembourg ==
Head coach: (Austria) Adolf Patek

Pos.	Player	DoB	Age	Caps	Club	Tournament games	Tournament goals	Minutes played	Sub off	Sub on	Cards yellow/red
FW	Julien Gales	July 13, 1924	28	?	CA Spora Luxembourg	2	2	210	–	–	–
MF	Fernand Guth	May 3, 1926	26	?	Union Luxembourg	2	0	210	–	–	–
MF	Johny Jaminet	April 25, 1930	22	?	(Luxembourg) The National Schifflange	2	0	210	–	–	–
GK	Ferd Lahure	March 28, 1929	23	?	(Luxembourg) FC Progrès Niedercorn	2	0	210	–	–	–
FW	Léon Letsch	May 20, 1927	25	?	(France) CO Roubaix-Tourcoing	2	1	210	–	–	–
FW	François Müller	February 23, 1927	25	?	(Luxembourg) FC Red Star Merl-Belair	2	0	210	–	–	–
FW	Victor Nurenberg	December 22, 1930	21	?	(France) OGC Nice	2	0	210	–	–	–
MF	Michel Reuter	November 24, 1929	22	?	(Luxembourg) SC Tetingen	2	0	210	–	–	–
FW	Joseph Roller	August 21, 1929	22	?	(Luxembourg) FC Progrès Niedercorn	2	3	210	–	–	–
DF	Léon Spartz	April 17, 1927	25	?	(Luxembourg) FA Red Boys Differdange	2	0	210	–	–	–
DF	Camille Wagner	April 13, 1925	27	?	(Luxembourg) CS Fola Esch	2	0	210	–	–	–
	Stand-by players -
FW	Gusty Back	October 15, 1925	26	?	(Luxembourg) CS Stade Dudelange	0	0	0	–	–	–
DF	Armand Bissen			?	(Luxembourg) CS Stade Dudelange	0	0	0	–	–	–
FW	Jos Hansen	June 8, 1932	20	?	(Luxembourg) The National Schifflange	0	0	0	–	–	–
GK	François Magnani	June 7, 1928	24	?	(Luxembourg) The National Schifflange	0	0	0	–	–	–
DF	Jacques Speck	December 5, 1931	20	?	(Luxembourg) The National Schifflange	0	0	0	–	–	–
FW	Marcel Welter	January 7, 1924	24	?	(Luxembourg) CS Pétange	0	0	0	–	–	–

== Netherlands ==
Head coach: Jaap van der Leck

Pos.	Player	DoB	Age	Caps	Club	Tournament games	Tournament goals	Minutes played	Sub off	Sub on	Cards yellow/red
DF	Sjaak Alberts	February 27, 1926	26	2	(Netherlands) Vitesse Arnhem	1	0	90	–	–	–
FW	Rinus Bennaars	October 14, 1931	20	2	(Netherlands) SV DOSKO	1	0	90	–	–	–
MF	Louis Biesbrouck	February 20, 1921	31	7	(Netherlands) Racing Club Heemstede	1	0	90	–	–	–
FW	Mick Clavan	March 11, 1929	23	15	(Netherlands) ADO Den Haag	1	0	90	–	–	–
GK	Piet Kraak	August 20, 1928	23	29	(Netherlands) Stormvogels Telstar	1	0	90	–	–	–
FW	Piet van der Kuil	February 10, 1933	19	2	(Netherlands) VSV	1	0	90	–	–	–
FW	Joannes Mommers	June 12, 1927	25	0	(Netherlands) Willem II	1	0	90	–	–	–
DF	Johannes Odenthal	March 13, 1924	28	3	(Netherlands) HFC Haarlem	1	0	90	–	–	–
FW	Jan van Roessel	April 7, 1925	27	1	(Netherlands) Willem II	1	1	90	–	–	–
MF	Rinus Terlouw	June 16, 1922	30	23	(Netherlands) Sparta Rotterdam	1	0	90	–	–	–
MF	Abraham Wiertz	November 21, 1919	32	4	(Netherlands) DWS	1	0	90	–	–	–
	Stand-by players -
FW	Cor van der Gijp	August 1, 1931	20	0	(Netherlands) SC Emma	0	0	0	–	–	–
DF	Wim Hendriks	April 19, 1930	22	1	(Netherlands) Vitesse Arnhem	0	0	0	–	–	–
DF	Ton van der Hurk	March 3, 1933	19	0	(Netherlands) FC Eindhoven	0	0	0	–	–	–
DF	Aad de Jong	December 1, 1921	30	5	(Netherlands) ADO Den Haag	0	0	0	–	–	–
GK	Wim Landman	April 13, 1921	31	0	(Netherlands) Sparta Rotterdam	0	0	0	–	–	–
FW	Frits Louer	November 24, 1931	20	0	(Netherlands) NAC Breda	0	0	0	–	–	–
FW	Noud van Melis	February 10, 1924	28	9	(Netherlands) FC Eindhoven	0	0	0	–	–	–
MF	Jan van Schijndel	March 4, 1927	25	12	(Netherlands) SVV	0	0	0	–	–	–
FW	Kees van der Tuijn	July 24, 1924	28	11	(Netherlands) Hermes DVS	0	0	0	–	–	–

== Netherlands Antilles ==
Head coach: Antoine Maduro

Pos.	Player	DoB	Age	Caps	Club	Tournament games	Tournament goals	Minutes played	Sub off	Sub on	Cards yellow/red
FW	Juan Briezen	August 9, 1928	23	?	(Netherlands) Aruba Juniors	1	1	90	0	0	0
FW	Jorge Brion	April 23, 1933	19	?	(Netherlands) Aruba Juniors	1	0	90	0	0	0
FW	Adriaan Brokke	October 22, 1928	23	?	(Netherlands) Racing Club Aruba	1	0	90	0	0	0
DF	Wilhelm Canword	July 11, 1932	20	?	(Netherlands) SUBT	1	0	90	0	0	0
DF	Wilfred de Lanoi	February 12, 1929	23	?	(Netherlands) Jong Holland	1	0	90	0	0	0
MF	Guillermo Giribaldi	May 17, 1929	23	?	(Netherlands) Sithoc	1	0	90	0	0	0
GK	Ergilio Hato	November 7, 1926	25	?	(Netherlands) Jong Holland	1	0	90	0	0	0
FW	Willys Heyliger	January 19, 1926	26	?	(Netherlands) SUBT	1	0	90	0	0	0
FW	Guillermo Krips	November 28, 1929	22	?	(Netherlands) Sithoc	1	0	90	0	0	0
DF	Pedro Matrona	December 9, 1927	24	?	(Netherlands) PSV Curaçao	1	0	90	0	0	0
MF	Eddy Vlinder	February 6, 1926	26	?	(Netherlands) SUBT	1	0	90	0	0	0
	Stand-by players -
MF	Ludgero Adoptie			?	(Netherlands) Jong Holland	0	0	0	0	0	0
FW	Pedro Coffie			?	(Netherlands) Sithoc	0	0	0	0	0	0
FW	Petrus Conquet			?	(Netherlands) Jong Curaçao	0	0	0	0	0	0
FW	Francisco Gómez			?	(Netherlands) SUBT	0	0	0	0	0	0
MF	Cai Helder			?	(Netherlands) Racing Club Aruba	0	0	0	0	0	0
GK	Lucas Hernández			?	(Netherlands) Aruba Juniors	0	0	0	0	0	0
DF	Raymundo Kemp	October 31, 1922	29	?	(Netherlands) Aruba Juniors	0	0	0	0	0	0
MF	Jozef Merced			?	(Netherlands) SUBT	0	0	0	0	0	0
FW	Leo Rodriguez			?	(Netherlands) Aruba Juniors	0	0	0	0	0	0

== Norway ==
Head coach: (England) Frank Soo

Pos.	Player	DoB	Age	Caps	Club	Tournament games	Tournament goals	Minutes played	Sub off	Sub on	Cards yellow/red
GK	Tom Blohm	June 29, 1920	32	?	(Norway) Lyn	1	0	90	–	–	–
FW	Gunnar Dahlen	April 28, 1918	34	?	(Norway) Freidig	1	0	90	–	–	–
DF	Erik Holmberg	May 23, 1922	30	?	(Norway) Fredrikstad	1	0	90	–	–	–
FW	Ragnar Hvidsten	December 3, 1926	25	?	(Norway) Sandefjord	1	0	90	–	–	–
FW	Henry Johannesen	December 12, 1923	28	?	(Norway) Fredrikstad	1	0	90	–	–	–
MF	Harry Boye Karlsen	March 14, 1920	32	?	(Norway) Larvik Turn	1	0	90	–	–	–
DF	Thorleif Olsen	November 15, 1921	30	?	(Norway) Vålerenga	1	0	90	–	–	–
FW	Odd Wang Sørensen	December 22, 1922	29	?	(Norway) Sparta	1	1	90	–	–	–
MF	Bjørn Spydevold	September 8, 1918	33	?	(Norway) Fredrikstad	1	0	90	–	–	–
DF	Thorbjørn Svenssen	April 22, 1924	28	?	(Norway) Sandefjord	1	0	90	–	–	–
FW	Gunnar Thoresen	July 21, 1920	32	?	(Norway) Larvik Turn	1	0	90	–	–	–
	Stand-by players -
GK	Asbjørn Hansen	May 29, 1930	22	?	(Norway) Sparta	0	0	0	–	–	–
DF	Oddvar Hansen	April 11, 1921	31	?	(Norway) Brann	0	0	0	–	–	–
DF	Dag Henriksen	February 11, 1928	24	?	(Norway) Eik-Tønsberg	0	0	0	–	–	–
FW	Tor Jevne	November 21, 1928	23	?	(Norway) Skeid	0	0	0	–	–	–
FW	Kjell Kristiansen	March 19, 1925	27	?	(Norway) Asker	0	0	0	–	–	–
MF	Dagfinn Nilsen	April 30, 1920	32	?	(Norway) Odd	0	0	0	–	–	–
FW	Egil Johnny Orre	December 9, 1920	31	?	(Norway) Asker	0	0	0	–	–	–
FW	Ove Ødegaard	April 11, 1931	21	?	(Norway) Snøgg	0	0	0	–	–	–
MF	Leif Pedersen	January 30, 1924	28	?	(Norway) Fredrikstad	0	0	0	–	–	–

== Poland ==
Head coach: Michał Matyas

Pos.	Player	DoB	Age	Caps	Club	Tournament games	Tournament goals	Minutes played	Sub off	Sub on	Cards yellow/red
FW	Henryk Alszer	May 7, 1918	34	6	(Poland) Ruch Chorzów
DF	Hubert Banisz	February 16, 1928	24	2	(Poland) Szombierki Bytom
MF	Zdzisław Bieniek	May 9, 1930	22	1	(Poland) Legia Warsaw
FW	Ewald Cebula	March 22, 1917	35	5	(Poland) Ruch Chorzów
FW	Gerard Cieślik	April 27, 1927	25	26	(Poland) Ruch Chorzów
DF	Władysław Gędłek	June 15, 1920	32	14	(Poland) Cracovia
MF	Kazimierz Kaszuba	April 5, 1930	22	1	(Poland) Wawel Kraków
FW	Jerzy Krasówka	August 17, 1924	24	2	(Poland) Szombierki Bytom
FW	Józef Mamoń	February 23, 1922	30	6	(Poland) Wisła Kraków
FW	Paweł Sobek	December 23, 1929	22	2	(Poland) Szombierki Bytom
GK	Tomasz Stefaniszyn	March 16, 1929	23	2	(Poland) Legia Warsaw
MF	Czesław Suszczyk	January 4, 1922	30	14	(Poland) Ruch Chorzów
GK	Edward Szymkowiak	February 13, 1932	20	2	(Poland) Ruch Chorzów
FW	Kazimierz Trampisz	January 10, 1929	23	3	(Poland) Polonia Bytom
FW	Jan Wiktor Wiśniewski	May 1, 1922	25	6	(Poland) Polonia Bytom

Tadeusz Glimas and Zbigniew Jaskowski were both named in Poland's squad, but did not play in any matches:

== Romania ==
Head coach: Gheorghe Popescu I

Pos.	Player	DoB	Age	Caps	Club	Tournament games	Tournament goals	Minutes played	Sub off	Sub on	Cards yellow/red
MF	Valeriu Călinoiu	October 9, 1928	23	?	(Romania) FC Dinamo București	1	0	90	–	–	–
DF	Zoltan Farmati	July 9, 1924	28	?	(Romania) Flamura Roşie Arad	1	0	90	–	–	–
FW	Eugen Iordache	April 30, 1922	30	?	(Romania) Flacăra Ploieşti	1	0	90	–	–	–
MF	Iosif Kovács	November 13, 1921	30	?	(Romania) Locomotiva Timişoara	1	0	90	–	–	–
FW	Titus Ozon	May 13, 1927	25	?	(Romania) FC Dinamo București	1	0	90	–	–	–
FW	Tudor Paraschiva	December 27, 1919	32	?	(Romania) Flacăra Petroşani	1	0	90	–	–	–
MF	Iosif Petschovski	July 2, 1921	31	?	(Romania) CSA București	1	0	90	–	–	–
MF	Gavril Serfözö	September 25, 1926	25	?	(Romania) Progresul Oradea	1	0	90	–	–	–
FW	Ion Suru	October 20, 1927	20	?	(Romania) FC Dinamo București	1	1	90	–	–	–
GK	Ion Voinescu	April 18, 1929	23	?	(Romania) CSA București	1	0	90	–	–	–
DF	Vasile Zavoda	July 26, 1929	22	?	(Romania) CSA București	1	0	90	–	–	–
	Stand-by players -
MF	Ștefan Balint	January 26, 1926	26	?	(Romania) CSA București	0	0	0	–	–	–
FW	Gheorghe Bodo	1923		?	(Romania) Progresul ICO Oradea	0	0	0	–	–	–
MF	Tiberiu Bone	April 13, 1929	23	?	(Romania) CSA București	0	0	0	–	–	–
GK	Aurel Crâsnic	May 11, 1926	26	?	(Romania) CS Flacăra Petroşani	0	0	0	–	–	–
DF	Guido Fodor			?	(Romania) FC Dinamo București	0	0	0	–	–	–
FW	Andrei Mercea	March 16, 1925	27	?	(Romania) Flamura Roşie Arad	0	0	0	–	–	–
GK	Traian Popa			?	(Romania) CS Locomotiva Târgu Mureş	0	0	0	–	–	–
DF	Iosif Ritter	December 2, 1921	30	?	(Romania) CS Locomotiva Timişoara	0	0	0	–	–	–
FW	Francisc Zavoda	April 14, 1927	25	?	(Romania) CSA București	0	0	0	–	–	–

== Sweden ==
Head coach: (England) George Raynor

Pos.	Player	DoB	Age	Caps	Club	Tournament games	Tournament goals	Minutes played	Sub off	Sub on	Cards yellow/red
DF	Olof Ahlund	August 22, 1920	31	?	(Sweden) Degerfors IF	1
FW	Sylve Bengtsson	July 2, 1930	22	?	(Sweden) Helsingborgs IF	4	1
FW	Yngve Brodd	June 9, 1930	22	?	(Sweden) Örebro SK	4	3
DF	Bengt Gustavsson	January 13, 1928	24	?	(Sweden) IFK Norrköping	4
DF	Holger Hansson	January 26, 1927	25	?	(Sweden) IFK Göteborg	3
DF	Gösta Lindh	February 8, 1924	28	?	(Sweden) Örebro SK	4
FW	Gösta Löfgren	August 29, 1923	28	?	(Sweden) Motala AIF	4	1
DF	Erik Nilsson	August 6, 1916	35	?	(Sweden) Malmö FF	4
FW	Ingvar Rydell	May 7, 1922	20	?	(Sweden) Malmö FF	4	3
DF	Lennart Samuelsson	July 7, 1924	28	?	(Sweden) IF Elfsborg	4
FW	Gösta Sandberg	August 6, 1932	19	?	(Sweden) Djurgårdens IF	4	1
GK	Kalle Svensson	November 11, 1925	26	?	(Sweden) Helsingborgs IF	4

Tore Svensson, Lars Carlsson, Karl-Erik Andersson, Sven Hjertsson, Åke Jönsson, Lars Eriksson, Nils-Åke Sandell and Egon Jönsson were all named in Sweden's squad, but did not play in any matches:

== Turkey ==
Head coach: (Italy) Sandro Puppo

Pos.	Player	DoB	Age	Caps	Club	Tournament games	Tournament goals	Minutes played	Sub off	Sub on	Cards yellow/red
GK	Erdoğan Akın	1929		?
	Kamil Altan	April 7, 1924		?	(Turkey) Eyüpspor
	Tekin Bilge	1930		?
	Rıdvan Bolatlı	December 2, 1928	23	?	(Turkey) Ankaragücü
	Yalçın Çaka	1931		?
	Vasıf Çetinel	1928		?
DF	Basri Dirimlili	June 7, 1929	23	?	(Turkey) Fenerbahçe
DF	Mustafa Ertan	April 21, 1926	26	?
	Ercüment Güder	1923		?	(Turkey) Ankaragücü
	Macit Gürdal	1931		?
	Necdet Şentürk	November 30, 1928		?	(Turkey) Sivas Gençlik
	Muzaffer Tokaç	July 22, 1922		?	(Turkey) Galatasaray

Fevzi Büyükyıldırım, Cahit Candan, Hadi Pozan, Ekrem Koldaş, Kaya K., Ergün İ. and were all named in Turkey's squad, but did not play in any matches:

== United States ==
Head coach: John Wood

Pos.	Player	DoB	Age	Caps	Club	Tournament games	Tournament goals	Minutes played	Sub off	Sub on	Cards yellow/red
GK	Robert Burkard	March 23, 1922		?	(United States) St. Louis Kutis S.C.	1	0	90	0	0	0
MF	Charles Colombo	July 20, 1920	32	?	(United States) St. Louis Simpkins-Ford	1	0	90	0	0	0
FW	Bill Conterio	November 11, 1929	22	0		0	0	0	0	0	0
FW	Elwood Cook	January 12, 1929		0	(United States) St. Louis Simpkins-Ford	1	0	90	0	0	0
DF	Harry Keough	November 15, 1927	24	?	(United States) St. Louis Raiders	1	0	90	0	0	0
DF	Ed McHugh	June 9, 1930	22	0		1	0	90	0	0	0
FW	Ruben Mendoza	June 2, 1931		?	(United States) St. Louis Raiders	1	0	90	0	0	0
FW	Lloyd Monsen	May 7, 1931	21	?	(United States) New York Americans	1	0	90	0	0	0
DF	Willy Schaller	February 23, 1933	19	?		1	0	90	0	0	0
DF	Bill Sheppell	March 11, 1926	26	?	(United States) Newark German-Americans	1	0	90	0	0	0
FW	John Souza	July 12, 1920	32	?	(United States) German Hungarian S.C.	1	0	90	0	0	0
FW	Lawrence Surock	November 9, 1930	21	?	University of Baltimore	1	0	90	0	0	0
FW	Jack Dunn	September 12, 1931	?	?	(United States) Temple University	0	0	0	0	0	0

Andy Keir and Marty Krumm were both named in the United States' squad, but did not play in any matches:

== Soviet Union ==
Head coach: Boris Arkadyev (CDSA Moscow)

Pos.	Player	DoB	Age	Caps	Club	Tournament games	Tournament goals	Minutes played	Sub off	Sub on	Cards yellow/red
DF	Anatoli Bashashkin	February 23, 1924	28	?	(Soviet Union) CDSA Moscow	3	0	330	–	–	–
FW	Konstantin Beskov	November 18, 1920	31	?	(Soviet Union) Dynamo Moscow	2	0	210	–	–	–
FW	Vsevolod Bobrov	December 1, 1922	29	?	(Soviet Union) VVS Moscow	3	5	330	–	–	–
FW	Avtandil Chkuaseli	December 31, 1931	20	?	(Soviet Union) Dinamo Tbilisi	1	0	90	–	–	–
FW	Avtandil Gogoberidze	August 3, 1922	29	?	(Soviet Union) Dinamo Tbilisi	1	0	120	–	–	–
FW	Anatoli Ilyin	June 27, 1931	21	?	(Soviet Union) Spartak Moscow	1	0	120	–	–	–
GK	Leonid Ivanov	July 25, 1921	31	?	(Soviet Union) Zenit Leningrad	3	0	330	–	–	–
DF	Konstantin Krizhevsky	February 20, 1926	26	?	(Soviet Union) VVS Moscow	3	0	330	–	–	–
FW	Fridrikh Maryutin	October 7, 1924	27	?	(Soviet Union) Zenit Leningrad	1	0	120	–	–	–
MF	Igor Netto	January 9, 1930	22	?	(Soviet Union) Spartak Moscow	3	0	330	–	–	–
FW	Valentin Nikolayev	August 16, 1921	30	?	(Soviet Union) CDSA Moscow	2	0	210	–	–	–
DF	Yuri Nyrkov	July 29, 1924	28	?	(Soviet Union) CDSA Moscow	3	0	330	–	–	–
MF	Aleksandr Petrov	September 27, 1925	26	?	(Soviet Union) CDSA Moscow	3	1	330	–	–	–
FW	Aleksandr Tenyagin	August 22, 1927	24	?	(Soviet Union) Dynamo Moscow	1	0	120	–	–	–
FW	Vasili Trofimov	January 7, 1919	33	?	(Soviet Union) Dynamo Moscow	3	2	330	–	–	–
	Stand-by players -
MF	Giorgi Antadze	September 9, 1920	31	?	(Soviet Union) Dinamo Tbilisi	–	–	–	–	–	–
DF	Agustín Gómez Pagóla	November 18, 1922	29	?	(Soviet Union) Torpedo Moscow	–	–	–	–	–	–
GK	Vladimir Nikanorov	July 14, 1917	35	?	(Soviet Union) CDSA Moscow	–	–	–	–	–	–
GK	Vladimir Margania	February 8, 1928	24	?	(Soviet Union) Dinamo Tbilisi	–	–	–	–	–	–
DF	Vladimir Zyablikov	July 5, 1925	27	?	(Soviet Union) Dynamo Moscow	–	–	–	–	–	–

== Yugoslavia ==
Head coach: Milorad Arsenijević

Pos.	Player	DoB	Age	Caps	Club	Tournament games	Tournament goals	Minutes played	Sub off	Sub on	Cards yellow/red
GK	Vladimir Beara	August 28, 1928	23	?	(Socialist Federal Republic of Yugoslavia) Hajduk Split
FW	Stjepan Bobek	December 3, 1923	28	?	(Socialist Federal Republic of Yugoslavia) Partizan
MF	Vujadin Boškov	May 16, 1931	21	?	(Socialist Federal Republic of Yugoslavia) Vojvodina
DF	Zlatko Čajkovski	February 5, 1934	22	?	(Socialist Federal Republic of Yugoslavia) Partizan
DF	Ratko Čolić	March 17, 1918	34	?	(Socialist Federal Republic of Yugoslavia) Partizan
MF	Vladimir Čonč	January 13, 1928		?	(Socialist Federal Republic of Yugoslavia) Lokomotiva
DF	Tomislav Crnković	June 17, 1929	23	?	(Socialist Federal Republic of Yugoslavia) Dinamo Zagreb
GK	Dušan Cvetković	1924		?	(Socialist Federal Republic of Yugoslavia) BSK Beograd
MF	Milorad Diskić	1925		?	(Socialist Federal Republic of Yugoslavia) Red Star Belgrade
DF	Vladimir Firm	June 5, 1923		?	(Socialist Federal Republic of Yugoslavia) Lokomotiva
DF	Ivica Horvat	July 16, 1926	26	?	(Socialist Federal Republic of Yugoslavia) Dinamo Zagreb
MF	Slavko Luštica	January 11, 1923	29	?	(Socialist Federal Republic of Yugoslavia) Hajduk Split
FW	Rajko Mitić	November 19, 1922	29	?	(Socialist Federal Republic of Yugoslavia) Red Star Belgrade
DF	Tihomir Ognjanov	March 2, 1927	25	?	(Socialist Federal Republic of Yugoslavia) Red Star Belgrade
FW	Zdravko Rajkov	December 5, 1927	24	?	(Socialist Federal Republic of Yugoslavia) Vojvodina
MF	Branko Stanković	October 31, 1921	30	?	(Socialist Federal Republic of Yugoslavia) Red Star Belgrade
FW	Bernard Vukas	May 1, 1927	25	?	(Socialist Federal Republic of Yugoslavia) Hajduk Split
MF	Branko Zebec	May 17, 1929	23	?	(Socialist Federal Republic of Yugoslavia) Partizan
GK	Branko Kralj			?
DF	Nikola Radović			?

== Sources ==
- FIFA
- RSSSF
- Yugoslavia squad at Serbian Olympic committee
- Great Britain team at British Olympic Association
- Denmark squad at DBU
- Sweden medalists at Swedish Olympic committee
- List of Luxembourgian olympic footballers at ALO
- Match report at voetbalstats.nl
- Greece – International Matches 1948-1960, RSSSF (Alexander Mastrogiannopoulos)
- List of Norwegian international footballers
- El equipo que fue Chile, Puro Naval.cl
- Brazil Olympic Matches
