= IBSF World Championships 2019 – Women =

Women at the IBSF World Championships 2019
- Venue: Whistler Sliding Centre
- Location: Whistler, Canada
- Dates: March 7–8
- Competitors: 26 from 17 nations
- Winning time: 3:33.03

Medalists
gold medal	Tina Hermann	Germany
silver medal	Jacqueline Lölling	Germany
bronze medal	Sophia Griebel	Germany

The Women competition at the IBSF World Championships 2019 was held on March 7 and 8, 2019.

== Results ==
The first two runs were started on March 7 at 12:34 and the last two runs on March 8 at 12:34.

Rank	Bib	Athlete	Country	Run 1	Rank	Run 2	Rank	Run 3	Rank	Run 4	Rank	Total	Behind
1st place, gold medalist(s)	5	Tina Hermann	Germany	53.17	1	53.48	1	53.27	1	53.11	2	3:33.03	
2nd place, silver medalist(s)	10	Jacqueline Lölling	Germany	53.42	2	53.58	2	53.31	2	53.10 TR	1	3:33.41	+0.38
3rd place, bronze medalist(s)	8	Sophia Griebel	Germany	53.83	3	53.64	3	53.38	3	53.35	3	3:34.20	+1.17
4	3	Anna Fernstaedtová	Czech Republic	53.96	5	53.70	4	53.52	5	53.62	5	3:34.80	+1.77
5	7	Elena Nikitina	Russia	53.93	4	53.81	5	53.66	7	53.66	6	3:35.06	+2.03
6	17	Marina Gilardoni	Switzerland	54.20	12	53.92	7	53.45	4	53.81	8	3:35.38	+2.35
7	19	Yulia Kanakina	Russia	54.14	11	53.95	8	53.77	8	53.54	4	3:35.40	+2.37
8	9	Savannah Graybill	United States	54.06	6	54.03	10	53.85	11	53.69	7	3:35.63	+2.60
9	4	Janine Flock	Austria	54.10	9	53.97	9	53.63	6	54.01	13	3:35.71	+2.68
10	12	Elisabeth Maier	Canada	54.24	13	53.91	6	53.82	10	53.86	10	3:35.83	+2.80
11	11	Kendall Wesenberg	United States	54.09	8	54.34	14	53.81	9	53.88	11	3:36.12	+3.09
12	6	Mirela Rahneva	Canada	54.12	10	54.51	16	54.02	12	53.85	9	3:36.50	+3.47
13	15	Kimberley Bos	Netherlands	54.46	14	54.51	16	54.39	16	53.88	11	3:37.24	+4.21
14	13	Renata Khuzina	Russia	54.08	7	54.81	19	54.36	15	54.02	14	3:37.27	+4.24
15	14	Madelaine Smith	Great Britain	54.63	16	54.23	11	54.28	14	54.25	16	3:37.39	+4.36
16	18	Ashleigh Fay Pittaway	Great Britain	54.47	15	54.44	15	54.44	18	54.09	15	3:37.44	+4.41
17	22	Madison Charney	Canada	54.71	17	54.30	13	54.13	13	54.57	18	3:37.71	+4.68
18	20	Megan Henry	United States	54.82	19	54.29	12	54.39	16	54.43	17	3:37.93	+4.90
19	25	Kellie Delka	Puerto Rico	54.71	17	54.75	18	54.96	21	54.73	19	3:39.15	+6.12
20	16	Kim Meylemans	Belgium	55.06	21	54.93	20	54.46	19	54.74	20	3:39.19	+6.16
21	23	Leslie Stratton	Sweden	55.03	20	55.00	21	55.04	23	Did not advance			
22	24	Lin Huiyang	China	55.20	22	55.25	22	54.93	20	Did not advance			
23	21	Valentina Margaglio	Italy	55.34	23	55.50	23	55.00	22	Did not advance			
24	1	Katie Tannenbaum	United States Virgin Islands	56.82	25	55.65	24	55.40	24	Did not advance			
25	2	Nicole Silveira	Brazil	56.04	24	56.09	25	55.91	25	Did not advance			
26	26	Georgina Cohen	Israel	57.00	26	58.38	26	57.20	26	Did not advance			
