= Sayed Mohamed =

Sayed Mohamed may refer to:

- Sayed Mohamed (footballer) (born 1920), Egyptian footballer
- Sayed Mohamed Adnan (born 1983), Bahraini footballer
- Syed Mohammad Hadi, Indian tennis player
- Saiyid Muhammad Hadi, Indian sugar cane expert
