= 1952 Bulgarian Cup final =

- Event: 1952 Bulgarian Cup
Slavia Sofia	Spartak Sofia
3	1
- Date: 9 November 1952
- Venue: People's Army Stadium, Sofia
- Referee: Trayan Hristov (Sofia)
- Attendance: 22,000

The 1952 Bulgarian Cup final was the 12th final of the Bulgarian Cup (in this period the tournament was named Cup of the Soviet Army), and was contested between Slavia Sofia and Spartak Sofia on 9 November 1952 at People's Army Stadium in Sofia. Slavia won the final 3–1.

== Route to the Final ==
Slavia		Round	Spartak
Opponent	Result		Opponent	Result
Minyor Pernik	2–0 away	Round of 16	Belasitsa Petrich	1–0 away
Levski Sofia	2–1 home	Quarter-finals	Spartak Pleven	3–1 home
Botev Plovdiv	2–1 away	Semi-finals	Lokomotiv Plovdiv	2–1 away

== Match ==
=== Details ===
9 November 1952

Slavia Sofia	3−1	Spartak Sofia
Stoychev 32'; Isakov 46'; N. Ivanov 86' (pen.)		Dr. Georgiev 69'

People's Army Stadium, Sofia
Attendance: 22,000
Referee: Trayan Hristov (Sofia)

Slavia	Spartak

GK	1	(Bulgaria) Yordan Yosifov
DF	2	(Bulgaria) Panayot Velev
DF	3	(Bulgaria) Todor Kapralov
DF	4	(Bulgaria) Milcho Goranov
MF	5	(Bulgaria) Toma Atanasov
MF	6	(Bulgaria) Nikola Ivanov
FW	7	(Bulgaria) Ignat Ignatov
MF	8	(Bulgaria) Yordan Mitov	(substituted off) 46'
FW	9	(Bulgaria) Dimitar Isakov
FW	10	(Bulgaria) Georgi Stoychev
MF	11	(Bulgaria) Toma Zahariev (c)
Substitutes:
MF	--	(Bulgaria) Kiril Chernev	(substituted on) 46'
Manager:
(Bulgaria) Ivan Radoev

GK	1	(Bulgaria) Apostol Sokolov
DF	2	(Bulgaria) Stoyan Vasilev	(substituted off) 25'
DF	3	(Bulgaria) Boris Apostolov (c)
DF	4	(Bulgaria) Petar Donchev
DF	5	(Bulgaria) Lyuben Traykov
MF	6	(Bulgaria) Hristo Panorov
FW	7	(Bulgaria) Todor Diev
MF	8	(Bulgaria) Dragan Georgiev
FW	9	(Bulgaria) Dobromir Tashkov
FW	10	(Bulgaria) Svetoslav Indzhev
FW	11	(Bulgaria) Georgi Nikolov
Substitutes:
DF	--	(Bulgaria) Dimitar Raykov	(substituted on) 25'
Manager:
(Bulgaria) Lyubomir Angelov

== See also ==
- 1952 A Group
