= IBSF World Championships 2019 – Mixed team =

Mixed team at the IBSF World Championships 2019
- Venue: Whistler Sliding Centre
- Location: Whistler, Canada
- Dates: March 3
- Competitors: 48 from 8 nations
- Teams: 8
- Winning time: 3:31.85

Medalists
gold medal	Christopher Grotheer; Anna Köhler; Lisa Sophie Gericke; Sophia Griebel; Johannes Lochner; Marc Rademacher	Germany
silver medal	Dave Greszczyszyn; Christine de Bruin; Kristen Bujnowski; Mirela Rahneva; Nick Poloniato; Keefer Joyce	Canada
bronze medal	Greg West; Brittany Reinbolt; Jessica Davis; Savannah Graybill; Geoffrey Gadbois; Kristopher Horn	United States

The Mixed team competition at the IBSF World Championships 2019 was held on March 3, 2019.

This would be the last World Championships with the mixed-sleds mixed team event – consisting of one run each of men's skeleton, women's skeleton, 2-man bobsleigh, and 2-women bobsleigh – first introduced at the 2007 championships. The 2020 championships would see the introduction of a skeleton-only mixed team event, consisting of one run each of men's and women's skeleton.

== Results ==
The race was started at 16:04.

Rank	Bib	Country	Total	Behind
1st place, gold medalist(s)	9	Germany	3:31.85	
2nd place, silver medalist(s)	6	Canada	3:32.00	+0.15
3rd place, bronze medalist(s)	7	United States	3:32.49	+0.64
4	4	United States	3:32.88	+1.03
5	5	International	3:33.19	+1.34
6	10	International	3:36.94	+5.09
7	11	Canada	3:37.08	+5.23
8	1	Russia	3:38.41	+6.56
—	8	Germany	Did not start	
