= Margania =

Margania (Georgian: მარღანია) is a Georgian surname. Notable people with the surname include:

- Vladimir Margania (1928–1958), Georgian and Soviet football player
- Zurab Margania, Chairman of the State Security Service of Abkhazia
