= Luis Leal =

Luis Leal may refer to:

- Luis Leal (baseball) (born 1957), Venezuelan baseball player
- Luis Leal (writer) (1907–2010), Mexican-American writer and critic
- Luis Leal (footballer, born 1929), Chilean footballer
- Luís Leal (footballer, born 1987), Santomean football player
- Luis Miguel Leal, Venezuelan music video director
