= Ahmed Rashed =

Ahmed Rashed may refer to:

- Ahmed Rashed (Egyptian footballer) (born 1928), Egyptian footballer
- Ahmed Rashed (footballer, born 1997), Emirati footballer
