= Jeremy Rice =

British skeleton racer (born 1990)

Jerry Rice
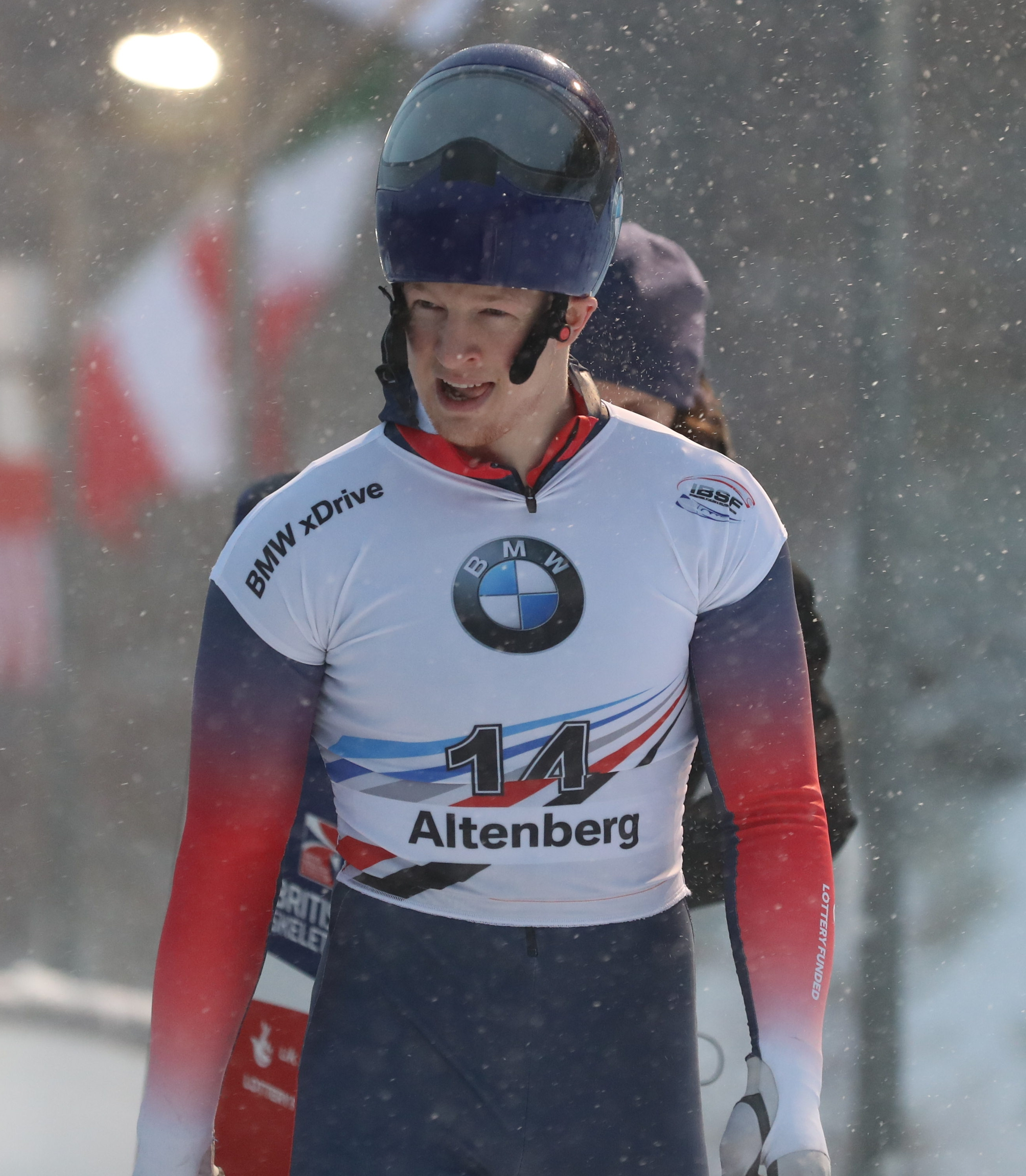
- Rice in 2019

Personal information
- Nationality: British
- Born: 3 October 1990 (age 35) High Wycombe, Buckinghamshire
- Height: 1.80 m (5 ft 11 in)
- Weight: 90 kg (198 lb)

Sport
- Country: Great Britain
- Sport: Skeleton

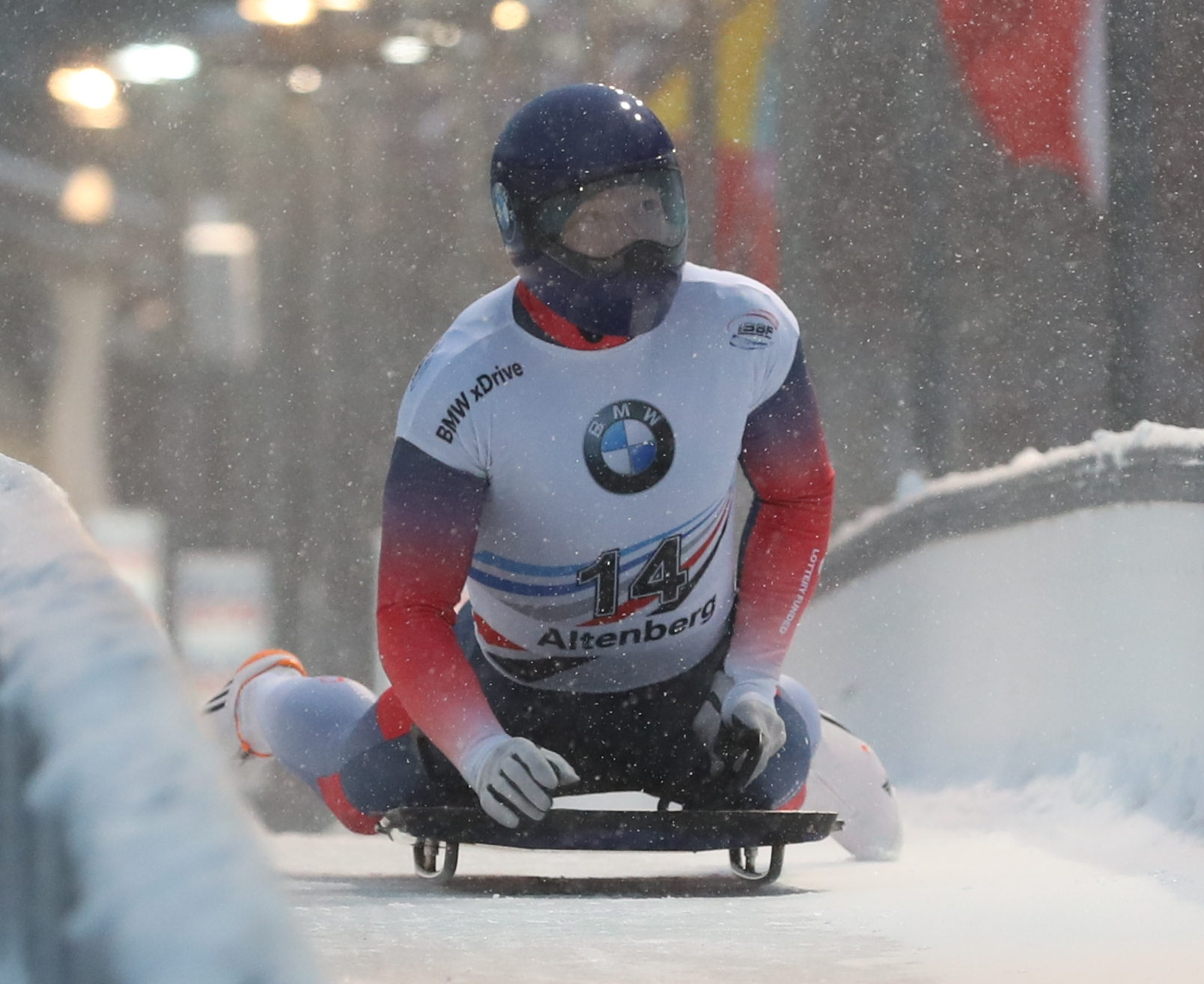
Rice at the 2018–19 World Cup Race

Jeremy Rice (born 3 October 1990) is a British skeleton racer. He competed in the 2018 Winter Olympics. He finished 10th out of a field of 30 athletes in the men's skeleton event at the games. In 2021 he announced his retirement.

== Career results ==
=== World championships ===
Event	Men
(Germany) 2017 Königssee	19th
(Canada) 2019 Whistler	21st
