= Gürdal (name) =

Gürdal is a surname and given name. Notable people with the name include:

== Surname ==
- Gamze Gürdal (born 1995), European champion Para Taekwondo
- Kemal Arda Gürdal (born 1990), Turkish swimmer
- Macit Gürdal (born 1931), Turkish footballer
- Michèle Gurdal (born 1952), Belgian tennis player

== Given name ==
- Gürdal Duyar (1935–2004), Turkish sculptor
- Gürdal Tosun (1967–2000), Turkish actor
