= Thomas Stewart =

Thomas Stewart may refer to:

== Politicians and nobility ==
- Thomas A. Stewart (politician) (1849–1920), member of the Wisconsin State Assembly
- Thomas E. Stewart (1824–1904), U.S. representative from New York
- Thomas Joseph Stewart (1848–1926), Canadian politician
- Tom Stewart (politician) (1892–1972), Tennessee politician
- Tom Stewart (New Hampshire politician), New Hampshire politician
- Thomas Stewart, 2nd Earl of Angus (1331–1361), medieval Scottish magnate
- Thomas Stewart, Master of Mar, son of Alexander Stewart, Earl of Mar, grandson of Alexander Stewart, Earl of Buchan, and great-grandson of Robert II of Scotland

== Sportspeople ==
- Thomas Stewart (Scottish footballer) (1926–1989), Scottish footballer
- Thomas Stewart (Irish footballer) (born 1986), Northern Irish footballer
- Tom Stewart (Australian footballer) (born 1993), Australian rules footballer for Geelong
- Tom Stewart (Scottish footballer) (fl. 1890s), Scottish footballer for Partick Thistle, Motherwell, Newcastle United, also known as George Stewart
- Tommy Stewart (footballer, born 1881) (1881–1955), English footballer
- Tommy Stewart (footballer, born 1935) (1935–2006), Northern Irish footballer
- Tom Stewart (cyclist) (born 1990), British racing cyclist
- Tom Stewart (rugby union) (born 2001), Irish rugby union player

== Musicians ==
- Thomas Stewart (bass-baritone) (1928–2006), American opera singer who specialized in Wagnerian roles
- Tommy Stewart (born 1966), drummer
- Tommy Stewart (trumpeter) (born 1939), American trumpeter, arranger, producer, composer and pianist

== Others ==
- Thomas Stewart (bishop of St Andrews), illegitimate son of King Robert II of Scotland, Bishop of St. Andrews
- Thomas Stewart (Catholic bishop) (1925–1994), bishop of the Roman Catholic Diocese of Chunchon
- Thomas Stewart (civil engineer) (1857–1942), Scottish hydraulic engineer, designer of Woodhead Dam
- Thomas A. Stewart (journalist) (born c. 1948), editor and managing director of Harvard Business Review
- Thomas McCants Stewart (1853–1923), African American clergyman, lawyer and civil rights leader
- Thomas Dale Stewart (1890–1958), American chemist
- Thomas Dale Stewart (anthropologist) (1901–1997), American forensic anthropologist
- Sir Thomas Grainger Stewart (1837–1900), Scottish physician
- Thomas Somerville Stewart (1806–1889), Philadelphia architect, engineer and real estate developer
- Tom Stewart (actor), English actor
- Sir Thomas Alexander Stewart (1888–1964), British colonial administrator in India
- T. S. Stewart (Thomas Samuel Stewart), commissariat storekeeper at Norfolk Island

== See also ==
- Thomas Stuart (disambiguation)
