= Keefer Joyce =

Canadian bobsledder

Personal information
- Nationality: Canadian
- Born: January 21, 1994 (age 32)
- Height: 1.86 m (6 ft 1 in)
- Weight: 92 kg (203 lb)

Sport
- Country: Canada
- Sport: Bobsleigh
- Event: Two-man
- Turned pro: 2017
Medal record
World Championships
Silver medal – second place	2019 Whistler	Mixed team

Keefer Joyce (born January 21, 1994) is a Canadian bobsledder.

He participated at the IBSF World Championships 2019, winning a medal.
