= Anna Köhler (bobsledder) =

German bobsledder (born 1993)

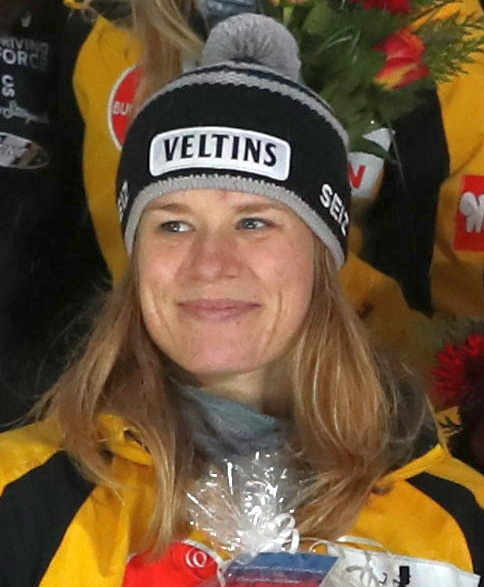
- Köhler in January 2019

Personal information
- Born: 5 August 1993 (age 32) Lindenfels, Germany
- Height: 1.77 m (5 ft 10 in)
- Weight: 76 kg (168 lb)

Sport
- Country: Germany
- Sport: Bobsleigh
- Event: Two-woman
- Club: BSC Winterberg
- Turned pro: 2013
Medal record
World Championships
Gold medal – first place	2019 Whistler	Mixed team
European Championships
Bronze medal – third place	2018 Innsbruck-Igls	Two-woman

Anna Köhler (also spelled Koehler; born 5 August 1993) is a German bobsledder. She competed in the 2018 Winter Olympics.
