= Jessica Davis (bobsledder) =

American bobsledder

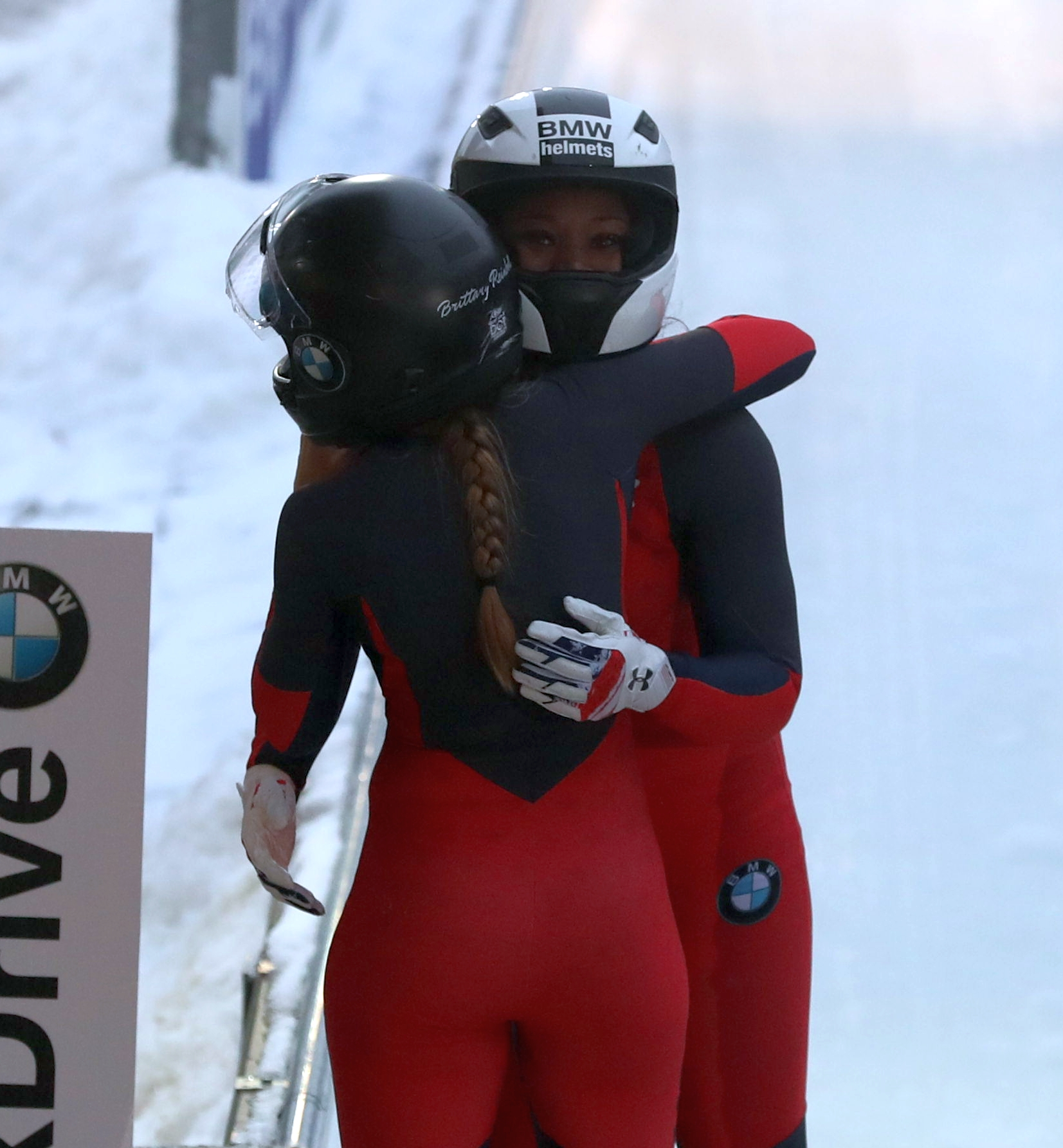
- Davis (facing)at the 2018-19 Bobsleigh World Cup Altenberg

Personal information
- Nationality: American
- Born: October 31, 1992 (age 33)

Sport
- Country: United States
- Sport: Bobsleigh
- Event: Two-woman
Medal record
World Championships
Bronze medal – third place	2019 Whistler	Mixed team

Jessica Davis (born October 31, 1992) is an American bobsledder.

She participated at the IBSF World Championships 2019, winning a medal.
