= Greg West (skeleton racer) =

American skeleton racer

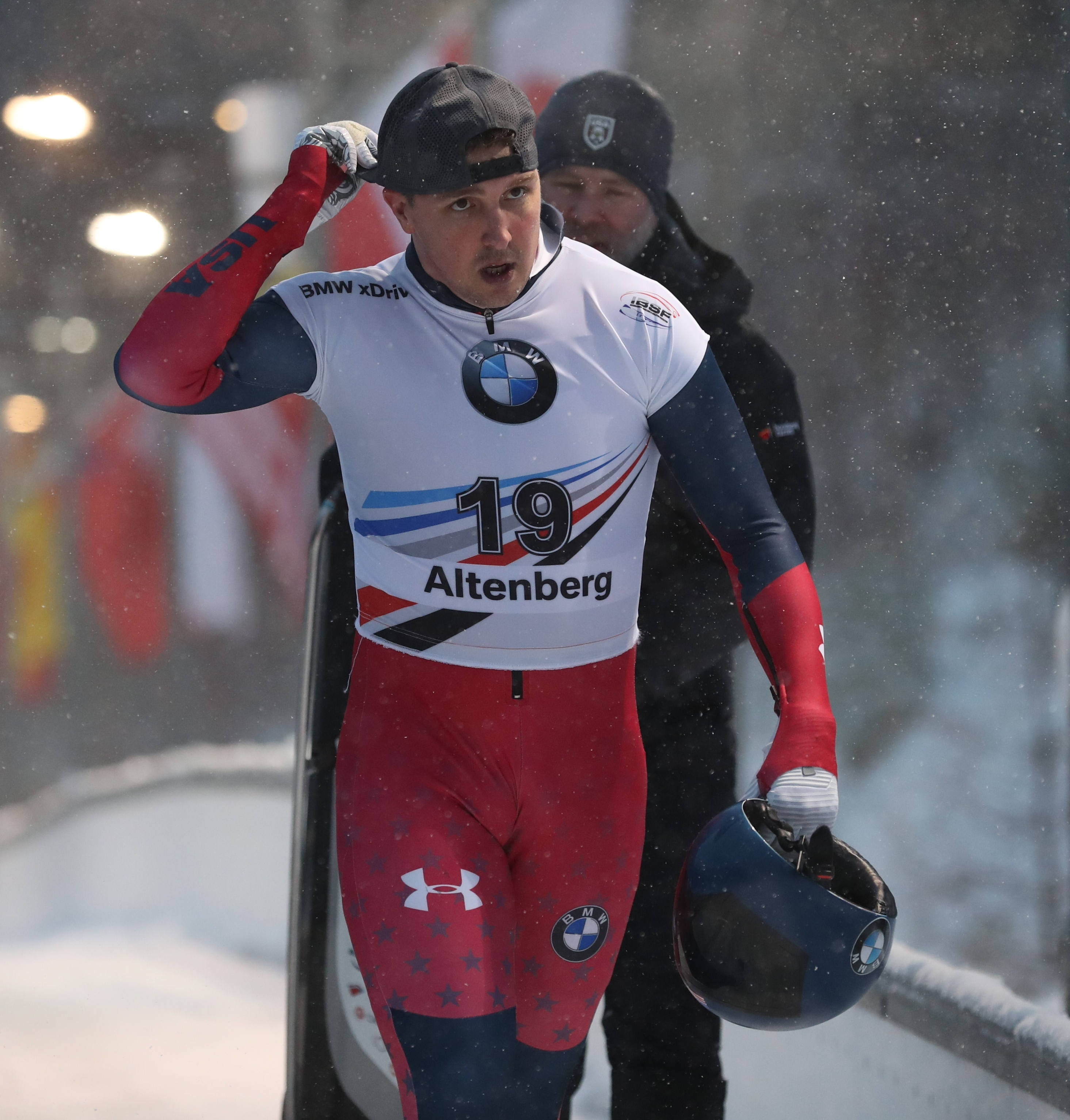

Personal information
- Born: June 13, 1985 (age 41) Springfield, United States
- Height: 5 ft 11 in (180 cm)
- Weight: 187 lb (85 kg)

Sport
- Country: United States
- Sport: Skeleton
- College team: Baker University
Medal record
World Championships
Bronze medal – third place	2019 Whistler	Mixed team

Greg West (born June 13, 1985) is an American skeleton racer.

He participated at the IBSF World Championships 2019, winning a medal.
