= Sophia Griebel =

German skeleton racer

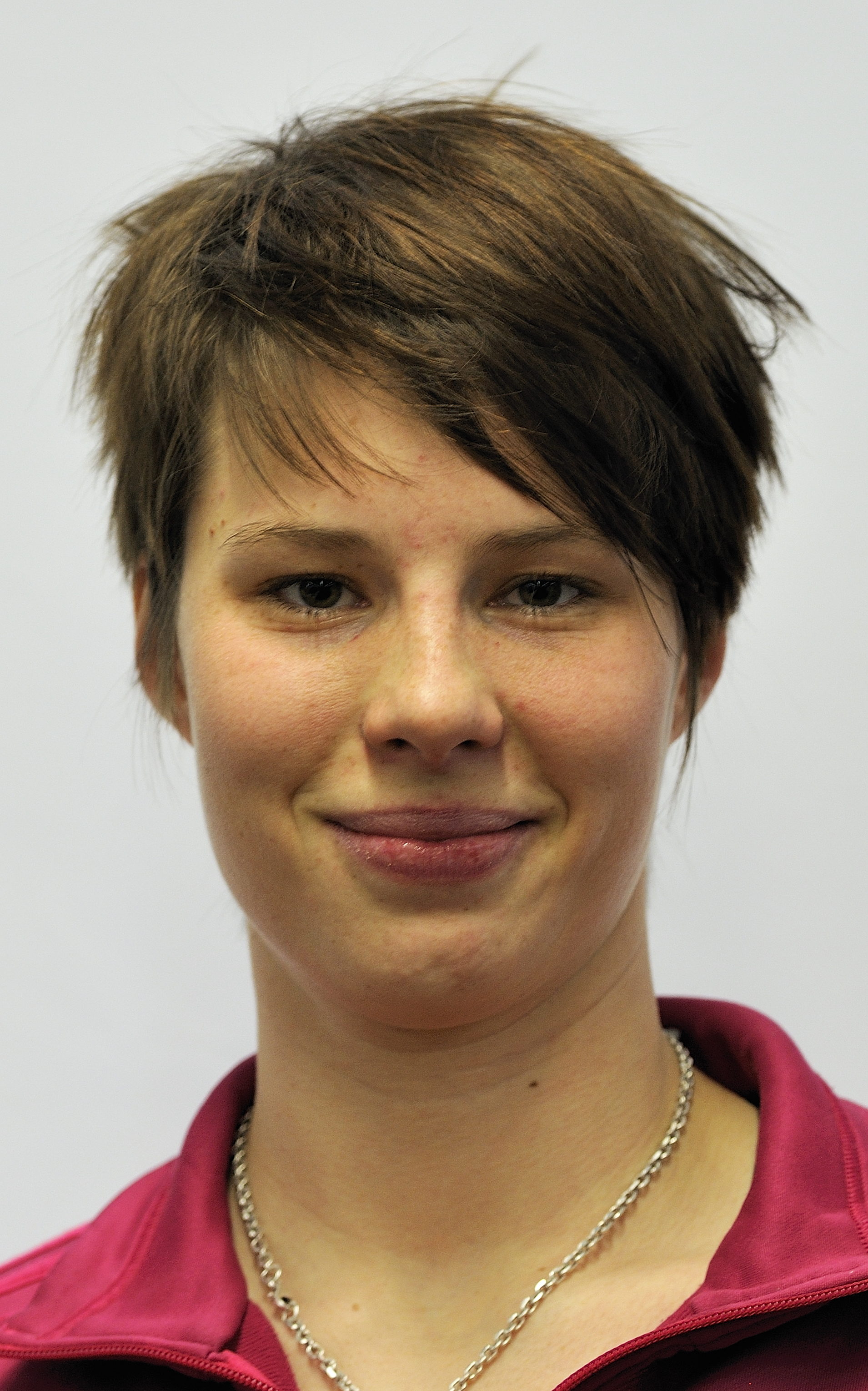

Personal information
- Nationality: German
- Born: 7 June 1990 (age 36) Suhl, East Germany
- Height: 1.72 m (5 ft 8 in)
- Weight: 65 kg (143 lb)

Sport
- Country: Germany
- Sport: skeleton
- Club: RT Suhl
- Turned pro: 2005
- Coached by: Christian Baude, Jens Müller

Achievements and titles
- Olympic finals: 10th (2014 Sochi)
Medal record
Skeleton
World Championships
Gold medal – first place	2019 Whistler	Mixed team
Bronze medal – third place	2019 Whistler	Women
Junior World Championships
Silver medal – second place	2013Igls	Women

Sophia Griebel (born 7 June 1990) is a German skeleton racer who has raced at the Winter Olympics and the Skeleton World Cup. She started racing skeleton in 2005 and was selected to the German national team in 2008; she was a luger before switching to skeleton. Her personal coach is Christian Baude and she uses an FES sled. Away from sport, she works for the German Federal Police. Griebel was injured in 2016 and spent 18 months recovering before returning to the World Cup circuit in November 2017, but after poor showings in the season's first two races, she was replaced on the German World Cup squad by Anna Fernstädt.

== Notable results ==
Griebel began international competition in 2008 on the Europe Cup, finishing 10th in her first race, at St. Moritz. At the 2009 Skeleton Junior World Championships she finished just off the podium in 4th place; that same season saw her take three podium finishes on the Europe Cup, including one gold, taking third place on the tour overall. The following season, she continued to race in the Europe Cup, taking five podiums (three wins) but only ninth at the Junior World Championships. Griebel was promoted to the Intercontinental Cup for the 2010–11 season, earning three gold medals and five silvers on the way to a first-place finish in the ICC season rankings, but only took fifth in the Junior World Championships.

Griebel continued to race on the lower levels of sliding until the 2012–13 season, when she joined the World Cup tour after earning a silver medal at the Junior World Championships. She finished 9th on her first World Cup start, at Altenberg. Griebel started the Olympic season of 2013–14 back on the ICC, earning four consecutive podiums before being promoted once again to the World Cup and earning a place on the German Olympic team for the 2014 Winter Olympics in Sochi. She won the final training run in Sochi, but could only manage a 10th-place finish in the competition proper.

Griebel returned the World Cup in 2014–15, earning her best finishes to date with fourth-place results at Calgary, Altenberg, and Königssee, but finished a disappointing 12th at her first senior World Championships. She ended that season ranked sixth in the World Cup rankings, behind two of her German teammates. The following (2015–16) season, Griebel finished fourth again at Altenberg and improved her World Championships result to fifth, but then was forced to sit out the entire 2016–17 season due to injury. Returning to the World Cup in 2017–18, another Olympic-shortened season, she fared poorly in two races before being demoted to the ICC squad in favor of Anna Fernstädt.
