= Thomas Stuart =

Thomas or Tom Stuart may refer to:

- Lord Thomas Stuart, a ballad
- Thomas Peter Anderson Stuart (1856–1920), professor of physiology
- Thomas Stuart, rugby union player for Westport Rugby Football Club
- Tom Stuart (EastEnders), a character on the British soap opera EastEnders
- Tom Stuart (footballer) (1893–1957), English footballer
- Tom Stuart (politician) (1936–2001), mayor of Meridian, Mississippi, from 1973 to 1977

== See also ==
- Thomas Stewart (disambiguation)
