= Lisa Sophie Gericke =

German bobsledder (born 1995)

Personal information
- Nationality: German
- Born: 17 March 1995 (age 31) Brandenburg an der Havel, Germany
- Height: 1.77 m (5 ft 10 in)
- Weight: 79

Sport
- Country: Germany
- Sport: Bobsleigh
- Event: Two-woman
- Club: Mitteldeutscher Sportclub
- Turned pro: 2015
Medal record
World Championships
Gold medal – first place	2019 Whistler	Mixed team

Lisa Sophie Gericke (born 17 March 1995) is a German bobsledder.

She participated at the IBSF World Championships 2019, winning a medal.
