= Wim Hendriks =

Dutch footballer (1930–1975)

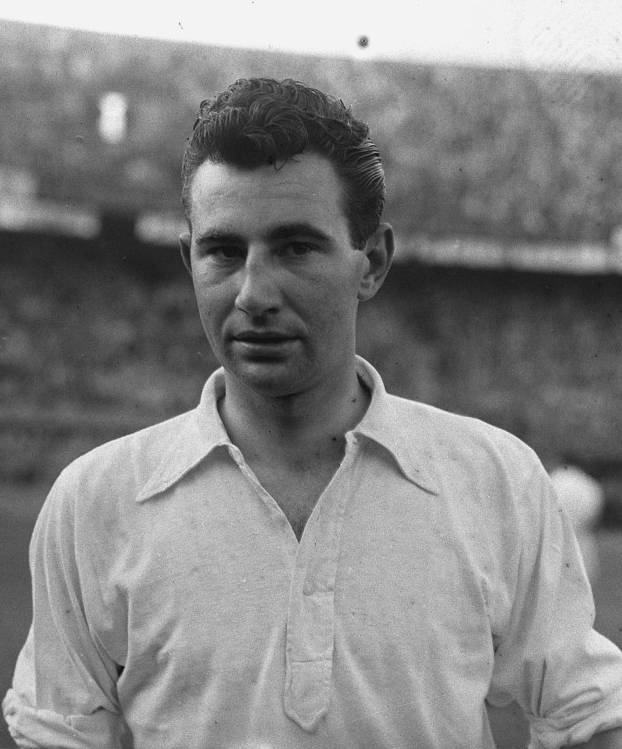

Personal information
- Full name: Wilhelmus Johannes Hendriks
- Date of birth: 19 April 1930
- Place of birth: Amsterdam, Netherlands
- Date of death: 24 March 1975 (aged 44)
- Place of death: Arnhem, Netherlands
- Position: Defender

Senior career*
Years	Team	Apps	(Gls)
1946–1954	Vitesse	166	(9)
1954–1955	De Graafschap		
1955–1959	KFC		

International career
1952–1953	Netherlands	3	(0)
- * Club domestic league appearances and goals

Wim Hendriks (19 April 1930 – 24 March 1975) was a Dutch footballer. He played in three matches for the Netherlands national football team between 1952 and 1953.

During his active career, Hendriks played for Vitesse, De Graafschap, and KFC Koog aan de Zaan.
