= Erdoğan Akın =

Turkish footballer

Personal information
- Date of birth: 1928
- Place of birth: İzmir, Turkey
- Date of death: March 2017 (aged 88–89)
- Position: Goalkeeper

Senior career*
Years	Team	Apps	(Gls)
- İzmir Karagücü

International career
- Turkey
- * Club domestic league appearances and goals

Erdoğan Akın (1928 – March 2017) was a Turkish footballer. He competed in the men's tournament at the 1952 Summer Olympics as a goalkeeper, conceding eight goals in two matches.
