= Savannah Graybill =

American skeleton racer (born 1988)

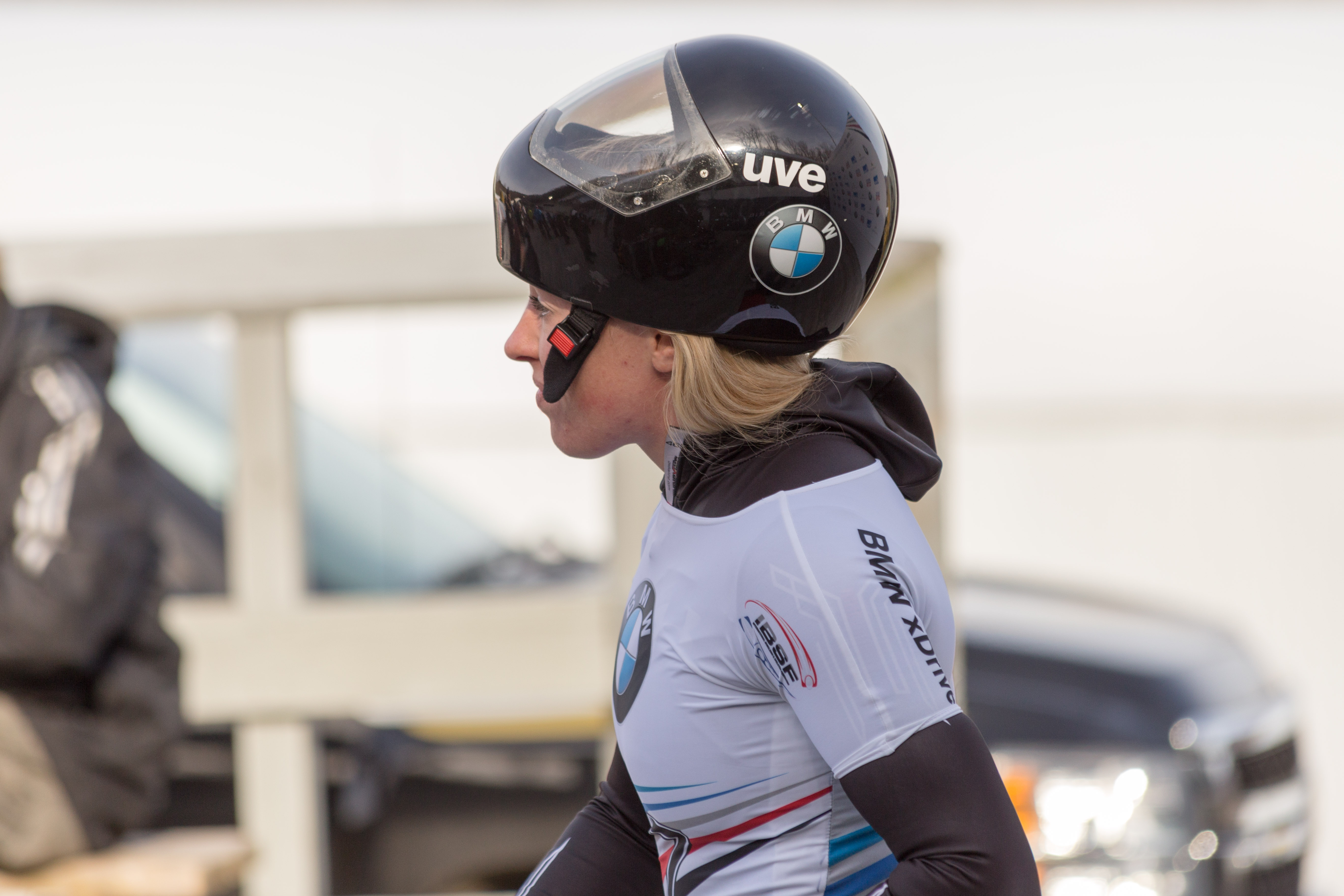
- Graybill at the Lake Placid World Cup in 2017

Personal information
- Nationality: American
- Born: 25 April 1988 (age 38) Denver, Pennsylvania
- Education: American University
- Height: 5 ft 6 in (168 cm)
- Weight: 148 lb (67 kg)

Sport
- Country: United States
- Sport: Field hockey (2002–2009); Skeleton (2010–present)
Medal record
World Championships
Bronze medal – third place	2019 Whistler	Mixed team

Savannah Graybill (born April 25, 1988) is an American skeleton racer who competes on the Skeleton World Cup circuit. She attended American University, from which she graduated in 2010 with a degree in Broadcast Journalism. When not competing, she works for a sporting-goods retailer in Plattsburgh, New York, near the United States Olympic Training Center in Lake Placid. Before skeleton, she tried out bobsledding, but did not compete in the sport; in high school and college, she played field hockey.

== Notable results ==
Graybill began racing internationally in the 2010–11 season, entering a single race on the lower-level North American Cup at Lake Placid, in which she finished 6th. (Lake Placid is also the U.S. Olympic Team's training facility.) The following season, she moved up to the Intercontinental Cup circuit, but for 2012–13 she moved back down to the lower level, starting races on the North American and European tours. She returned to the ICC in 2013–14, and was promoted to the World Cup squad for the 2015–16 season. In her first World Cup race, at Lake Placid, Graybill finished fifth, her best ever showing at the top level of the sport. Her first World Championships appearance was in 2017 at Königssee, where she finished 15th.
