= Yalçın Çaka =

Turkish footballer (born 1931)

Personal information
- Date of birth: 1931
- Position: Midfielder

Senior career*
Years	Team	Apps	(Gls)
1952–1953	Ankaragücü		

International career
1952	Turkey	2	(0)
- * Club domestic league appearances and goals

Yalçın Çaka (born 1931) is a Turkish former footballer. He competed in the men's tournament at the 1952 Summer Olympics.
