= Ekrem Koldaş =

Turkish footballer

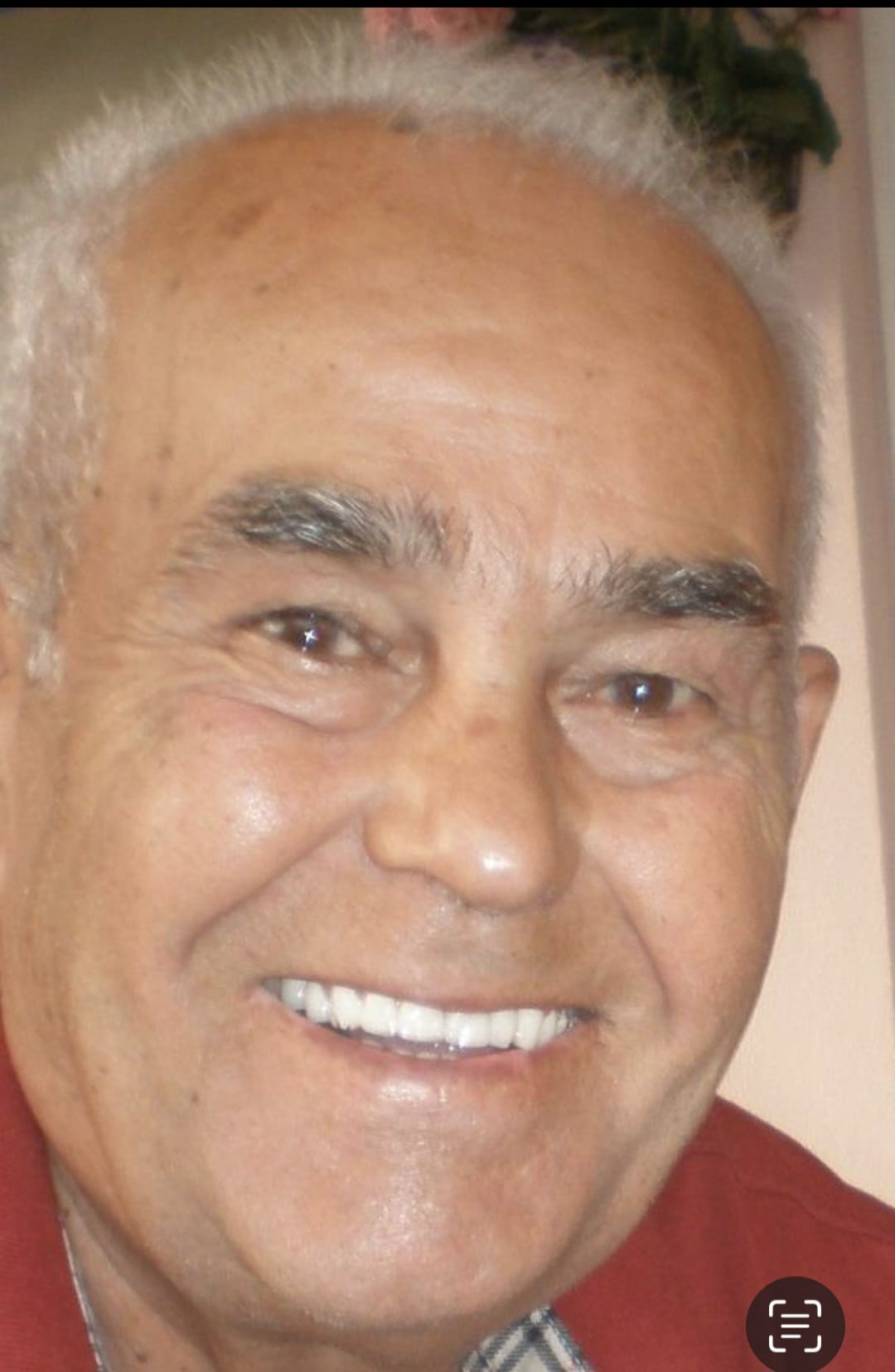
- Ekrem Koldaş c.2010s.

Personal information
- Full name: Ekrem Koldaş
- Date of birth: 6 July 1934
- Place of birth: İzmir, Turkey
- Date of death: 7 February 2015 (aged 80)
- Height: 1.74 m (5 ft 9 in)
- Position: Centre-back

Youth career
- Altınordu

Senior career*
Years	Team	Apps	(Gls)
1951–1957	Altınordu		
1958–1960	Beykozspor		
1960–1962	Beşiktaş		
1962–1963	Altınordu		
1963–1967	Göztepe		

International career
1952	Turkey (Olympic squad)		
- * Club domestic league appearances and goals

Ekrem Koldaş (Turkish pronunciation: [ˈecɾem ˈkoɫdaʃ]; 6 July 1934 – 7 February 2015) was a Turkish football player who primarily played as a centre-back defender for several Izmir and Istanbul-based football teams during the 1950s and 1960s. Raised in İzmir, Koldaş had a long club career including notable stints at Altınordu F.K., Beykoz Anadolu, Beşiktaş J.K., and Göztepe S.K.. He was known for his consistency and sportsmanship on the field. Koldaş was selected for the Turkey national squad at the 1952 Helsinki Olympic Games, though he did not appear in any matches. He died in 2015 at the age of 80, and is especially remembered in his hometown of İzmir having been acknowledged for the perceived loyalty he has shown Izmir-based football clubs.

== Early life and background ==
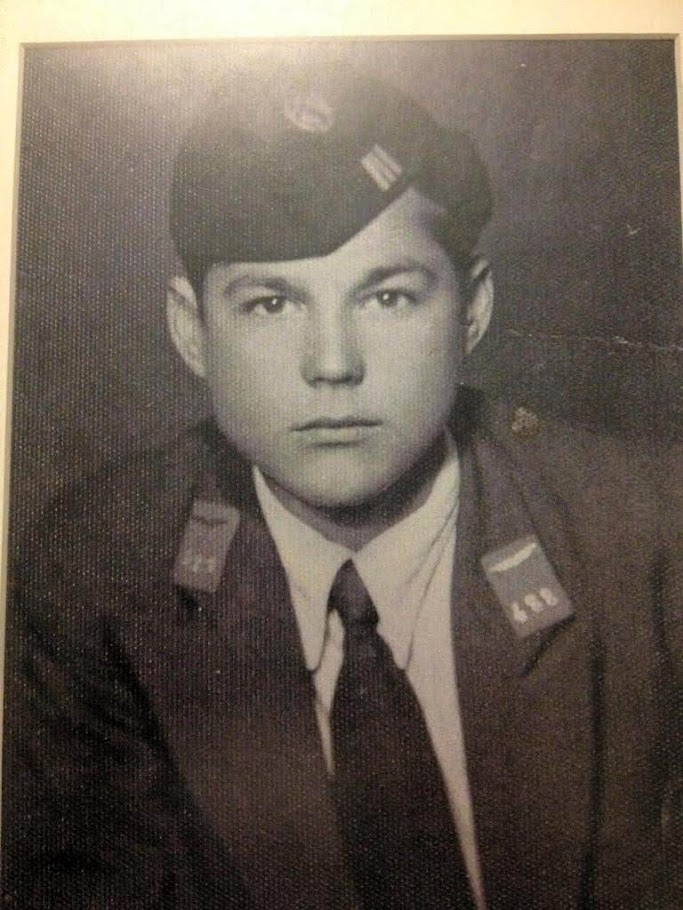
Young Ekrem Koldaş in uniform, early 1950s.

Ekrem Koldaş was born on 6 July 1934 in İzmir, Turkey. Family oral history suggests that his father was born in Hungary in the 1910s, a time when small populations of Turks were still residing in the Balkans as part of post-Ottoman populations. The family eventually settled in İzmir. Koldaş grew up in İzmir in a modest household and showed an early interest in football. His surname, Koldaş, was likely adopted by his family following the 1934 Surname Law as no familial connection to the surname is shown passed Ekrem Koldas himself.

No additional biographical data regarding his upbringing, schooling, or early influences in football is available in publicly verified sources.

== Youth and club career ==
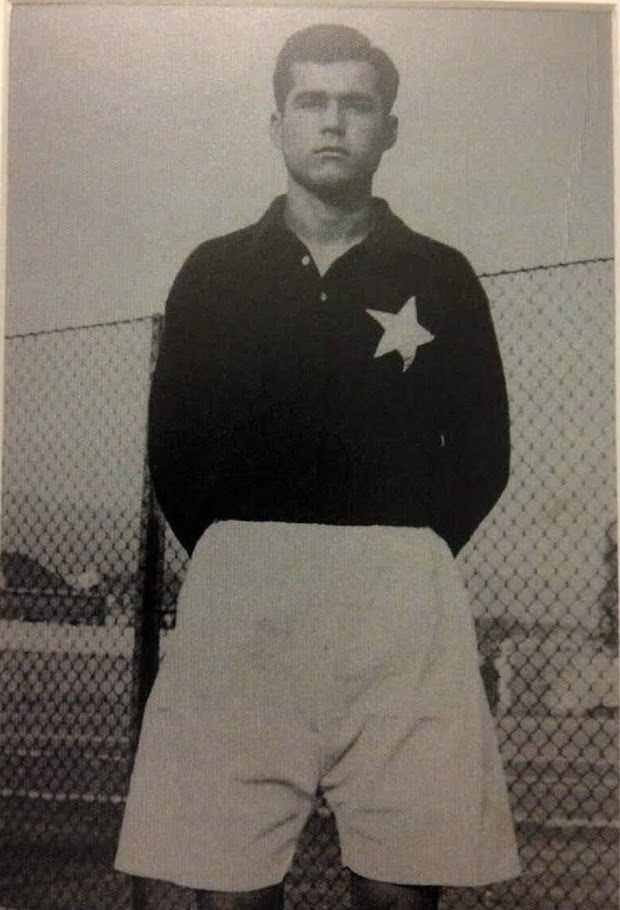
A young Ekrem Koldaş stands in front of a chain-link fence, wearing the distinctive black jersey with a white star of the Turkish B National Team from the late 1950s.

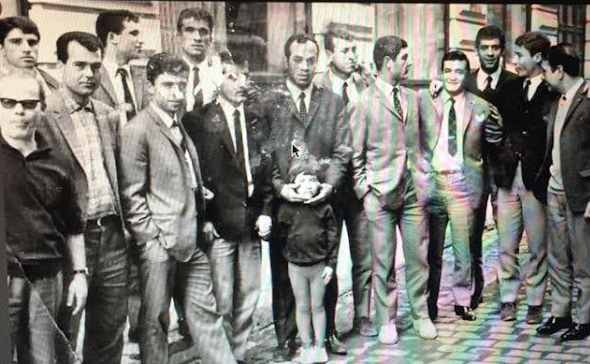
Göztepe teammates, İzmir, mid-1960s. The squad off the pitch, dressed in suits and gathered outside a city building. Koldaş is positioned second from the left in the front row.

Koldaş began his football career at local club Altınordu in 1951 as a teenager. He began his senior football career with Altınordu in July 1956, after progressing through the club's youth ranks. In all, Koldaş spent roughly seven years at Altınordu (1951–1958), during which time he helped the team compete in the İzmir local leagues and in the early years of nationwide competition. He was noted to have served as team captain during a period of his tenure with the club. He played for Altınordu til mid-1958.

In July 1958, he transferred to Beykozspor (commonly known as Beykoz), an Istanbul-based team participating in the newly formed Turkish National League (then the Millî Lig, now the Trendyol Süper Lig formed in 1959). He remained at Beykozspor for two seasons from 1958 until 1960.

In 1960, Koldaş joined Beşiktaş J.K., where he played as a centre-back. He made 3 league appearances in the 1960–61 season and 29 appearances in 1961–62 season. After two years at Beşiktaş, he returned to Altınord for one season 1962–63 season before transferring to Göztepe S.K. in July 1963. Koldaş played for Göztepe until June 1967, making 62 league appearances. He also played two matches (180 minutes) for Göztepe in the 1964–65 Inter-Cities Fairs Cup, a precursor to the UEFA Cup.

Koldaş retired from professional football in 1967, after roughly 16 years in the sport, at the age of 33. Over his professional career, he made at least 94 documented top-flight league appearances. Turkish football archives confirm his presence in the squads and lineups of each of his clubs during the relevant periods.

== International career ==
Koldaş was selected as a non-playing squad member for Turkey's national football team at the 1952 Summer Olympics in Helsinki. Turkey’s team was eliminated in the early rounds of the competition, and Koldaş remained a non-playing reserve (listed as a “Non-starter” on the roster)

No further appearances or caps for the senior national team are documented. His international career, therefore, is defined by this single Olympic team selection.

== Playing style and position ==
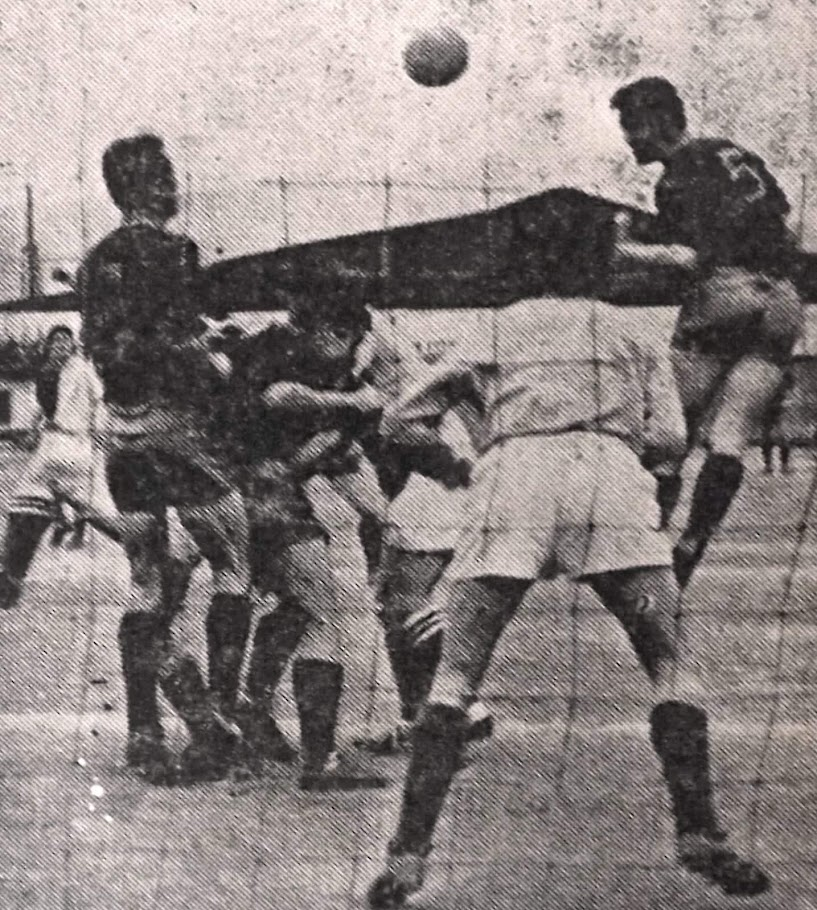
A defensive header by Ekrem Koldaş (right, wearing #5) during a match played in İzmir.

Koldaş played predominantly as a centre-back and occasionally filled roles as a sweeper (libero) or defensive midfielder (known in Turkish as “ön libero”). His listed height of 1.74 m (5 ft 8½ in) and weight of 68 kg was below average for a central defender, suggesting he may have relied more on positioning and anticipation than physical dominance. His style of play was marked by consistency, discipline, and a high level of sportsmanship. As mentioned early on from sources detailing his club performances at Altınordu, teammates and fans regarded him as a “gentleman” on the field as he was rarely booked for rough play and was respected for his fair conduct.

There are no further detailed contemporary assessments of his technical style or tactical attributes.

== Achievements and honors ==
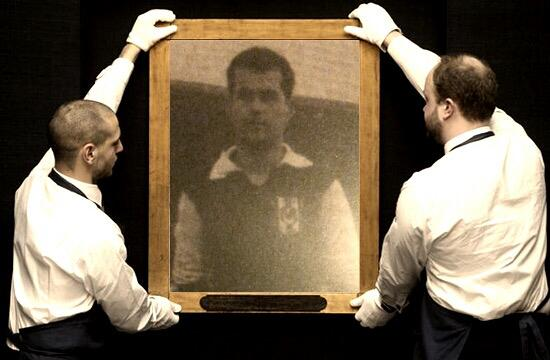
Portrait of Ekrem Koldaş displayed in a commemorative frame at the Beşiktaş Museum.

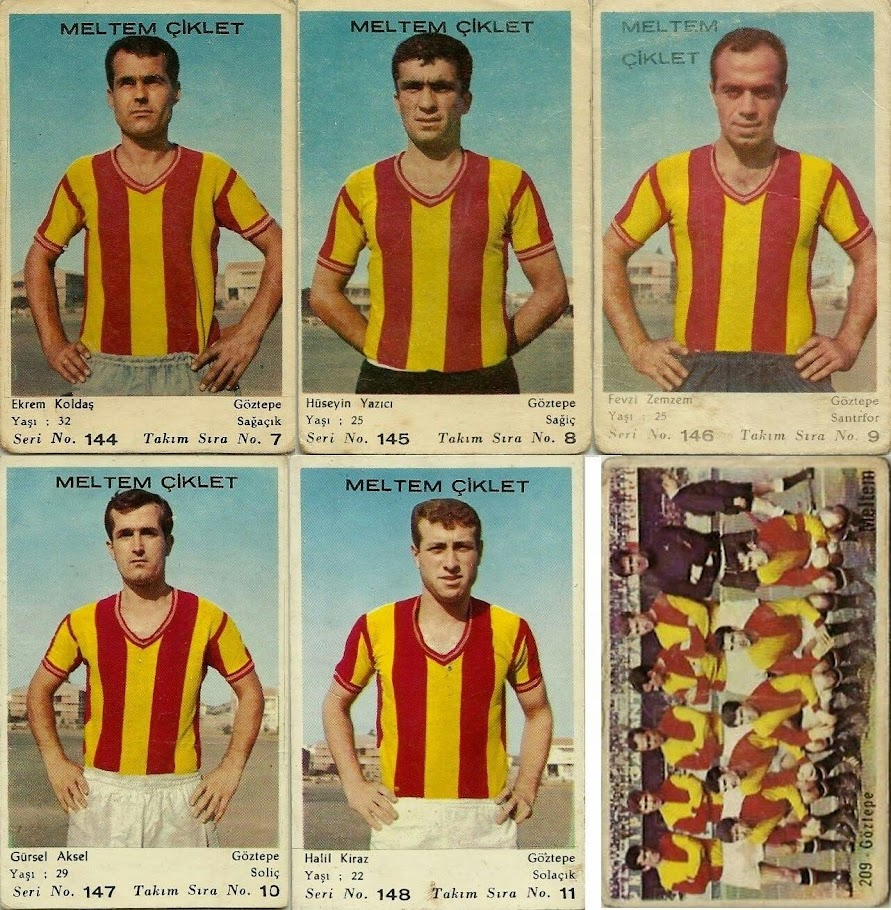
Meltem Çiklet collector cards featuring Göztepe S.K. players, 1960s.

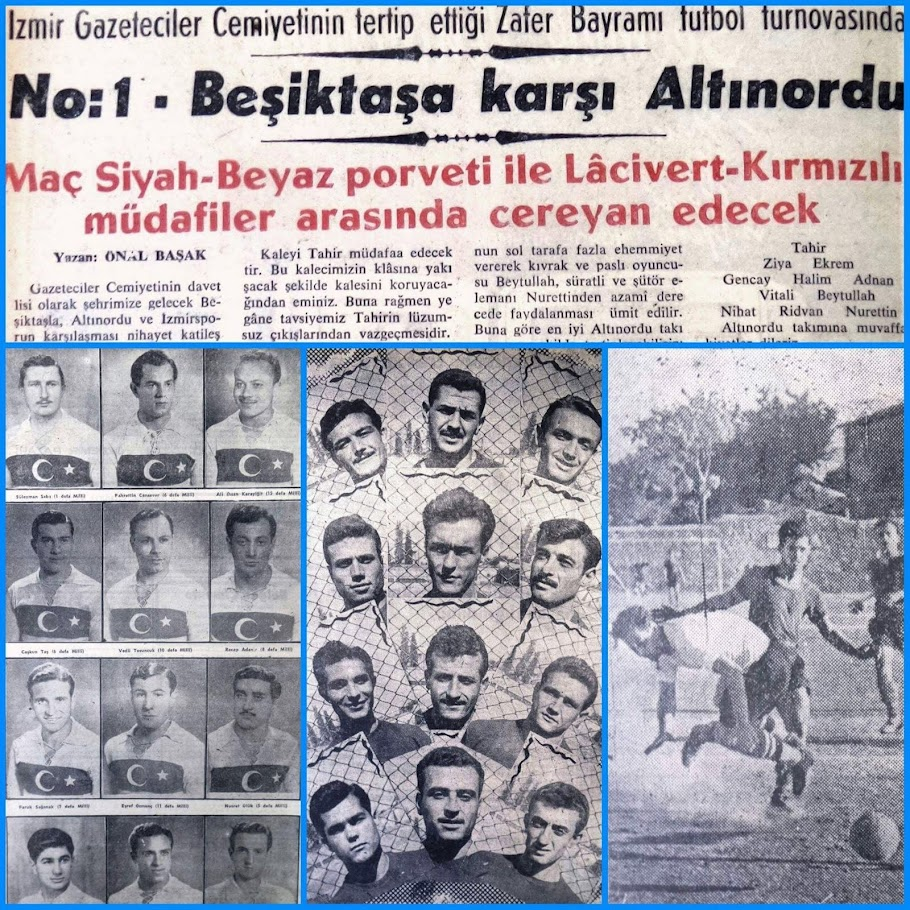
Ekrem Koldaş featured in Turkish sports newspaper coverage (c. 1950s–1960s). Centre collage, bottom left.Translation: Main Headline: No:1 – Beşiktaş vs. Altınordu (In the Victory Day football tournament organized by the Izmir Journalists Association).

Throughout his career, Ekrem Koldaş did not accumulate many tangible trophies, as he happened to play for clubs that were competitive but did not often win national titles during his tenure. He did not win a Turkish league championship nor Turkish Cup as a player. While he was with Beşiktaş, the club finished near the top of the league (third place in 1960–61) but did not clinch the title. Similarly, Göztepe achieved strong league finishes in the mid-1960s but the major silverware for that team (such as the Turkish Cup victories in 1969 and 1970) came after Koldaş had retired.

However, Koldaş’s achievements can be measured in terms of his personal contributions and recognitions:

- Club Leadership: At Altınordu, Koldaş served as team captain for several seasons.
- Pioneering the National League: Koldaş was part of the first generation of footballers to play in the Turkish Millî Lig (National League), which was later re-established in 1959 as the Trendyol Süper Lig.
- Altınordu Legend: Koldaş is officially recognized by Altınordu as one of the club’s “Legendary Footballers”. The Altınordu sports club historical archives, lists him among the notable players who significantly contributed to the club, in the same company as other Altınordu greats such as Seyfi Talipzade, Erdoğan Arıca, and Çağlar Söyüncü, who each left their own mark on the club’s legacy.
- “80-Year Loyalty Award”: In May 2013, at 78 years old, Koldaş was honored with an “80 Yaş Üstü Vefa Ödülü” (80-Year Loyalty Award) at a special ceremony in İzmir. This award was organized by the İzmir Gücü Spor Vakfı (İZVAK) to recognize football veterans who had served İzmir football. Koldaş, along with dozens of other veteran players and sports figures from İzmir, received a plaque honoring his lifetime of contributions to the sport in the city.
- Olympic Team Selection: Although not a traditional “award,” it is worth noting as an achievement that Koldaş’s skill earned him a spot on the national Olympic squad in 1952.

== Personal life and death ==
Ekrem Koldaş's personal life remains largely undocumented in public records. In the 1950s, he married Aysel Bayam, with whom he would go on to raise four sons, Zafer Koldaş, Tamer Koldaş, Onder Koldaş, and Soner Koldaş.

Sources confirm Zafer Koldaş and Önder Koldaş, former professional footballers, as his sons. Zafer Koldaş played as a defender for clubs including Altay and Yeni Salihlispor during the late 1970s and 1980s, and contributing to a Turkish Cup–winning squad. Önder Koldaş, played as a licensed footballer for Çimentaş Elazığspor between 1990 and 1992; during that period he appeared in at least six league matches in the 1.Lig (second tier).

After retiring from professional football, Koldaş resided in the Karamanlar neighborhood of İzmir and did not pursue a public role in coaching or football administration. Additional family or biographical details are not available in independent, verifiable publications.

On 7 February 2015, Ekrem Koldaş died at the age of 80. His death was marked by condolences from clubs including Beşiktaş J.K., which issued an official statement.

== Ancestral research ==
No known academic or genealogical study has focused on Ekrem Koldaş’s family tree. Publicly available information about his parents or grandparents is virtually non-existent in media sources. What can be surmised is that his family was from the İzmir region and they were Turks living in the early Republican period.

== Notes ==
1. Altınordu SK Official Website – Legendary Footballers: Ekrem Koldaş. Provides a summary of Koldaş’s career at Altınordu, including his years at the club, leadership role, subsequent transfers, and personal life details.
2. Beşiktaş JK Official Announcement (11 February 2015) – Vefat ve Başsağlığı. An official condolence message noting the passing of Ekrem Koldaş, and mentioning his service to Beşiktaş in the 1960–61 and 1961–62 seasons.
3. WorldFootball.net – Player summary for Ekrem Koldaş. Contains a breakdown of the clubs he played for and the years/periods of his transfers (Beykoz, Beşiktaş, Altınordu, Göztepe), as well as physical statistics.
4. Olympedia – Profile of Ekrem Koldaş. Confirms his participation in the 1952 Olympic football squad for Turkey and lists him as a non-playing team member.
5. İZVAK Ceremony Report (Haberler.com, 29 May 2013) – Article covering the İzmir 80+ years loyalty awards, listing Ekrem Koldaş among the honorees and describing the event.
6. Turkish sports archives (e.g., Mackolik, Maçkolik, etc.) – season statistics (in Turkish) that record appearances and standings for clubs during Koldaş’s career, used to verify league finishes and context (e.g., Beşiktaş’s 3rd place in 1960–61).
7. No mainstream media sources detail Koldaş’s spouse or grandchildren, indicating a lack of public information on those aspects of his personal life.
