= Saiyid Muhammad Hadi =

Indian agricultural technologist

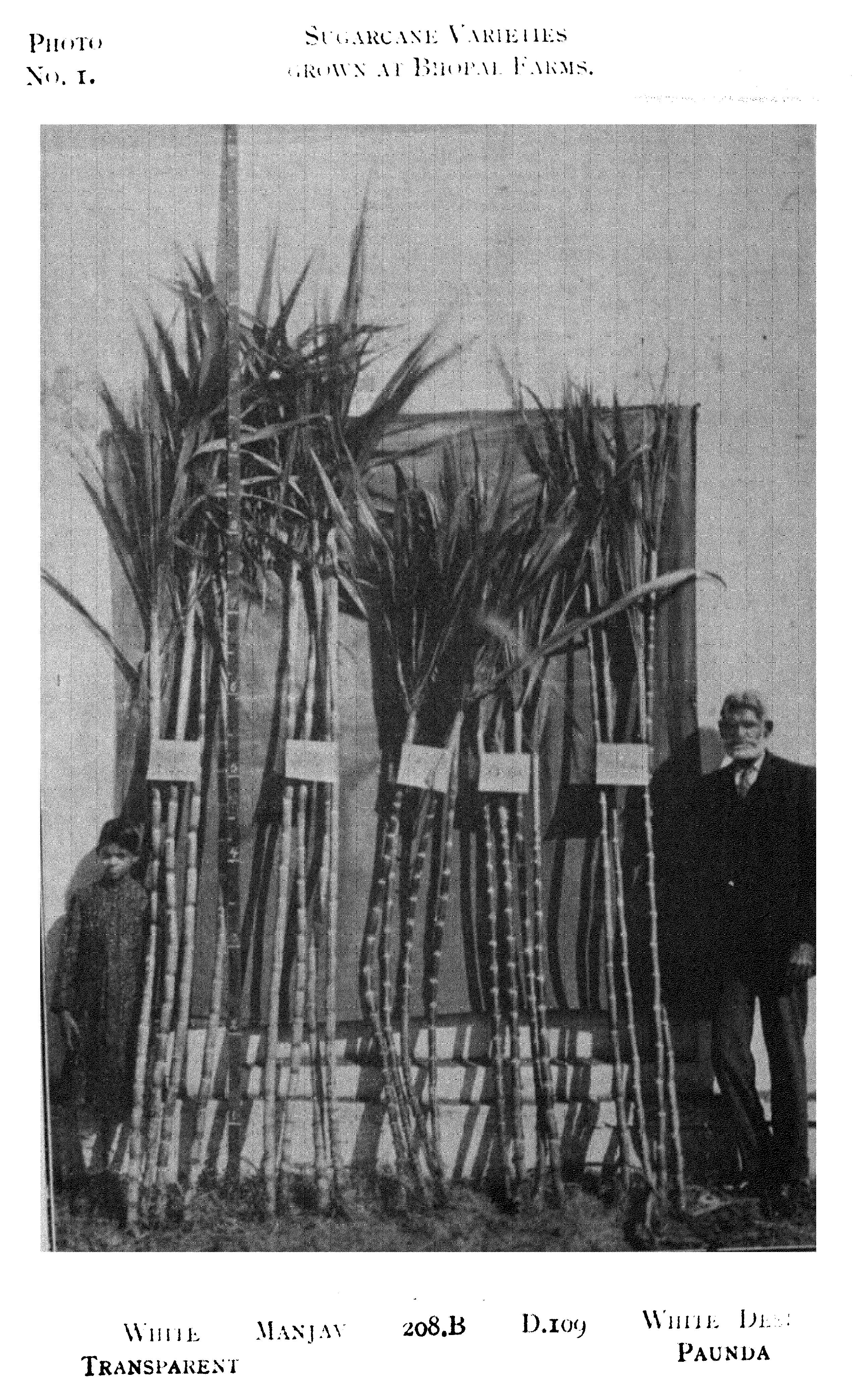
Sugarcane varieties in Bhopal, 1929

Saiyid Muhammad Hadi (4 September 1863, Hasanpur, Awadh – 5 June 1939, Lucknow, India) was a British-trained official who worked in the United Provinces and served as a Director of Agriculture in Bhopal State. He worked on the improvement of sugarcane processing. The so-called Hadi or Bhopal method of sugarcane processing was a major improvement over early processes, with significant savings on losses. He was given the title of Khan Bahadur for his contributions.

== Life and work ==
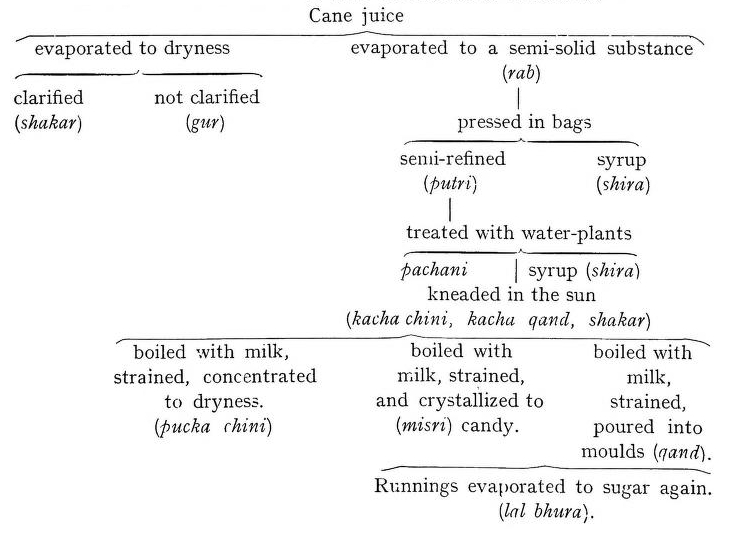
Traditional sugarcane processing terms used in India

Hadi came from a family of Baraha Syeds who had fled Lucknow to Muzaffarnagar after the Sikhs invaded. A grandfather had been a military officer in Oudh and a collector of revenue in Sultanpur District. Hadi's father had been a Tahsildar in Pratapgarh during Mughal rule who practiced law after English annexation. Hadi studied at Sultanpur High School and was trained at the Royal College, Cirencester where he received the Holland Gold Medal. He was later deputed by the Oudh Talukdars to travel to America in 1888-89 to examine the possibility of technical education for Indian students. He was deputed by the Secretary of State to study in Paris under Louis Pasteur between 1882 and 1889 and then joined the Agricultural Department in the United Provinces. Hadi worked under W. H. Moreland in the United Provinces of Agra and Oudh. He was appointed assistant magistrate and collector 5 April 1890. Assistant director of land records 1891. Superintendent of inland emigration 1893. He became Deputy Commissioner for Pratapgarh on 4 January 1911.

== Work on sugarcane processing ==
From around 1904 he began to examine sugar production in the United Provinces. He was awarded the title of Khan Bahadur on 1 January 1907 for his work in developing the so-called Hadi process for refining jaggery from sugarcane with reduced losses. The Hadi method was involved in the reducing losses in the production of rab (massecuite) and a reduction in the inversion of sucrose by controlling the heat and by the use of centrifugation. Hadi also modified the construction of the pans or bels in which the cane juice was boiled. The method also involved using slow heating with dilute sodium carbonate and juice of Hibiscus esculentus as a clarifying agent. Scum that floats to the top is removed by hand and no lime is used. This resulted in a yield of 40% sugar from rab as opposed to 20% in the older process that involved filtering the viscous rab through jute bags by having people walk over them. He also attempted to produce refined white sugar while in Bhopal around 1908 but this was a failure. These methods were made completely obsolete by the 1930s by factory production systems based on innovations made in the West Indies and Java.

== Publications ==
Hadi's major publications include:

- A note on breeds of cattle in the district of Bahraich, Oudh (1895)
- A monograph on dyes and dyeing in the North-Western Provinces and Oudh (1899)
- The Sugar Industry of the United Provinces of Agra and Oudh (1902)
- Clarke, G. & S.M. Hadi (1909) Sugarcane at the Partabgarh Experimental Station 1908. Calcutta: Government Press.
- Indian Sugar Industry (1929)
