= Ton van den Hurk =

Dutch footballer (1933–2021)

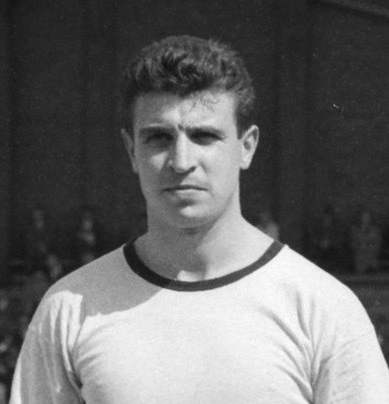
- Van den Hurk in 1961

Personal information
- Full name: Antonius van den Hurk
- Date of birth: 3 March 1933
- Place of birth: Eindhoven, Netherlands
- Date of death: 8 April 2021 (aged 88)
- Place of death: Weert, Netherlands
- Height: 1.84 m (6 ft 0 in)
- Position: Defender

Youth career
- 1945-1950: EVV Eindhoven

Senior career*
Years	Team	Apps	(Gls)
1950–1954	EVV Eindhoven		
1954	Venlo '54	11	(1)
1954–1962	FC VVV	248	(4)
1962–1963	Sittardia	16	(0)
1963–1964	Panningen		
1964–1965	FC VVV	21	(0)
1965–1968	Panningen		

International career
1950–1951	Netherlands U-19	13	(0)
- * Club domestic league appearances and goals

Antonius "Ton" van den Hurk (3 March 1933 – 6 April 2021) was a Dutch footballer who played as a defender.

== Playing career ==
=== Club ===
Born in Stratum, Eindhoven, van den Hurk started his career after World War II at local club EVV Eindhoven. However, he moved to the newly founded professional side Sportclub Venlo '54 in 1954 after experiencing a lack of playing time. After Venlo '54 merged with amateur club FC VVV, he scored FC VVV's first ever professional league goal from the penalty spot on 28 November 1954 away against Ajax. He later won the 1958–59 KNVB Cup with the club.

After relegation from the Eredivisie in 1962, he was sold to Sittardia, but left them in 1963 for amateur club SV Panningen, only to return to VVV for one more season. He played his last game for them in April 1965 against FC Volendam.

=== International ===
He earned 13 caps for the Netherlands national under-19 team between 1950 and 1951.

== Managerial career ==
Van den Hurk coached at amateur sides Belfeldia, SV Blerick, Wittenhorst and VV Swalmen.
