= Hermann Hochleitner =

Austrian footballer (1925–2010)

Personal information
- Date of birth: 17 October 1925
- Place of birth: Salzburg, Austria
- Date of death: 26 May 2010 (aged 84)
- Place of death: Salzburg, Austria
- Position: Forward

International career
Years	Team	Apps	(Gls)
- Austria

Hermann Hochleitner (17 October 1925 – 26 May 2010) was an Austrian footballer. He competed in the men's tournament at the 1952 Summer Olympics.
