= Mauro (footballer, born 1932) =

Brazilian footballer

Personal information
- Full name: Mauro Torres Homem Rodrigues
- Date of birth: 22 March 1932 (age 94)
- Position: Defender

Senior career*
Years	Team	Apps	(Gls)
- Fluminense
- * Club domestic league appearances and goals

Mauro Torres Homem Rodrigues (born 22 March 1932), better known as just Mauro, is a Brazilian former footballer who competed in the 1952 Summer Olympics.
