= Hubert Banisz =

Polish footballer (1928–1983)

Personal information
- Full name: Hubert Józef Banisz
- Date of birth: 16 February 1928
- Place of birth: Piekary Śląskie, Poland
- Date of death: 19 March 1983 (aged 55)
- Place of death: Bytom, Poland
- Height: 1.76 m (5 ft 9 1/2 in)
- Position: Defender

Senior career*
Years	Team	Apps	(Gls)
1939–1948	Orzeł Brzeziny Śląskie		
1949–1959	Szombierki Bytom		

International career
1952–1953	Poland	6	(0)
- * Club domestic league appearances and goals

Hubert Józef Banisz (16 February 1928 – 19 March 1983) was a Polish footballer who played as a defender. He competed in the 1952 Summer Olympics.
