= Justo Albornoz =

Chilean footballer (1926–1981)

Personal information
- Date of birth: 29 January 1926
- Date of death: 22 June 1981 (aged 55)
- Position: Forward

International career
Years	Team	Apps	(Gls)
- Chile

Justo Albornoz (29 January 1926 – 22 June 1981) was a Chilean footballer. He competed in the men's tournament at the 1952 Summer Olympics.
