= Jacques Bohée =

French footballer (1929-1977)

Personal information
- Date of birth: 16 August 1929
- Place of birth: Wattrelos, France
- Date of death: 18 March 1977 (aged 47)
- Position: Midfielder

Youth career
- Excelsior AC Roubaix

Senior career*
Years	Team	Apps	(Gls)
1945–1953	CO Roubaix-Tourcoing		
1953–1957	Red Star		
- * Club domestic league appearances and goals

Jacques Bohée (16 August 1929 – 18 March 1977) was a French football midfielder who was a member of the French squad at the 1952 Summer Olympics.
