= Moussa Mohamed =

Egyptian footballer (born 1925)

Personal information
- Full name: Mohamed Omar Moussa Al-Zangira
- Date of birth: 1925
- Position: Defender

International career
Years	Team	Apps	(Gls)
- Egypt

Moussa Mohamed (born 1925) was an Egyptian footballer. He competed in the men's tournament at the 1952 Summer Olympics.
