= Necdet Şentürk =

Turkish footballer (born 1928)

Personal information
- Date of birth: 1928 (age 97–98)
- Place of birth: Sivas, Turkey
- Position: Midfielder

Senior career*
Years	Team	Apps	(Gls)
1945–1952	Sivas Gençlik		
1952–1953	Hacettepe	27	(2)
1953–1956	Galatasaray		
1956–1967	Hacettepe		

International career
1952	Turkey	2	(0)
- * Club domestic league appearances and goals

Necdet Şentürk (born 1928) was a Turkish footballer. He competed in the men's tournament at the 1952 Summer Olympics.

== Honours ==
Galatasaray

- Istanbul Football League: 1955–56
