= Vladimir Nikanorov =

Soviet footballer (1917–1980)

Personal information
- Full name: Vladimir Nikanorov
- Date of birth: 7 February 1917
- Date of death: 20 May 1980 (aged 62)

Vladimir Nikolaevich Nikanorov (Russian: Владимир Николаевич Никаноров) 2 [15] July 1917, Moscow, Russian Empire - 20 May 1980, Moscow, USSR) - was a Soviet footballer (goalkeeper) and hockey player (defender). Honored Master of Sports of the USSR (since 1948). Five-time champion of the USSR in football, three-time winner of the USSR Cup in football. Three-time USSR ice hockey champion. The first captain of the USSR national ice hockey team. He was also part of the Soviet Union's squad for the 1952 Summer Olympics, but he did not play in any matches.
