= Minko Minchev =

Bulgarian footballer

Personal information
- Date of birth: 1925
- Date of death: 1996 (aged 70–71)
- Position: Goalkeeper

International career
Years	Team	Apps	(Gls)
1948–1950	Bulgaria	3	(0)

Minko Minchev (1925 – 1996) was a Bulgarian footballer. He played in three matches for the Bulgaria national football team from 1948 to 1950. He was also part of Bulgaria's squad for the 1952 Summer Olympics, but he did not play in any matches.
