= Todor Kapralov =

Bulgarian footballer

Personal information
- Date of birth: 1923
- Position: Defender

International career
Years	Team	Apps	(Gls)
1950	Bulgaria	2	(0)

Todor Kapralov (born 1923) was a Bulgarian footballer. He played in two matches for the Bulgaria national football team in 1950. He was also part of Bulgaria's squad for the 1952 Summer Olympics, but he did not play in any matches.
