= Ahmed Rashed (Egyptian footballer) =

Egyptian footballer (born 1928)

Personal information
- Full name: Ahmed Hanafy M. Rashed
- Date of birth: 20 November 1928
- Position: Midfielder

International career
Years	Team	Apps	(Gls)
- Egypt

Ahmed Hanafy M. Rashed (born 20 November 1928, date of death unknown) was an Egyptian footballer. He competed in the men's tournament at the 1952 Summer Olympics.
