= Thomas Stewart (Scottish footballer) =

Scottish footballer

Personal information
- Full name: Thomas Stewart
- Date of birth: 11 March 1926
- Place of birth: Kilmacolm, Scotland
- Date of death: 7 May 1989 (aged 63)
- Place of death: Birmingham, England
- Positions: Full back; wing half

Senior career*
Years	Team	Apps	(Gls)
1946–1950	Queen's Park	27	(0)
1950–1951	Romford		
1951–1953	Queen's Park	43	(5)
- Bishop Auckland

International career
1949–1955	Scotland Amateurs	15	(1)
1952	Great Britain	2	(0)
- * Club domestic league appearances and goals

Thomas Stewart (11 March 1926 – 7 May 1989) was a Scottish amateur footballer who played as a right half in the Scottish League for Queen's Park and in English non-League football for Bishop Auckland and Romford. He captained Scotland at amateur level and represented Great Britain at the 1952 Summer Olympics.

== Personal life ==
Stewart worked in advertising.

== Career statistics ==
Appearances and goals by club, season and competition
Club	Season	League			National Cup		League Cup		Other		Total	
Club	Season	Division	Apps	Goals	Apps	Goals	Apps	Goals	Apps	Goals	Apps	Goals
Queen's Park	1948–49	Scottish Second Division	7	0	0	0	1	0	3 (Note: 1 appearance in Glasgow Cup, 1 appearance in Glasgow Merchants Charity Cup, 1 appearance in B Division Supplementary Cup)	0	11	0
Queen's Park	1949–50	Scottish Second Division	19	0	1	0	0	0	0	0	20	0
Queen's Park	1950–51	Scottish Second Division	1	0	0	0	2	1	0	0	3	1
Queen's Park	Total		27	0	1	0	3	1	3	0	34	1
Queen's Park	1951–52	Scottish Second Division	19	2	1	0	4	1	2 (Note: 1 appearance in B Division Supplementary Cup, 1 appearance in Saint Mungo Cup)	0	26	3
Queen's Park	1952–53	Scottish Second Division	24	3	1	0	2	0	3 (Note: Appearances in Glasgow Merchants Charity Cup)	0	30	3
Queen's Park	1953–54	Scottish Second Division	1	0	0	0	4	0	0	0	5	0
Queen's Park	Total		43	5	2	0	10	12	5	0	95	7
Career total			71	5	3	0	13	2	8	0	95	7

== Honours ==
Bishop Auckland

- FA Amateur Cup (2): 1954–55, 1955–56
