= Vladimir Margania =

Georgian and Soviet footballer

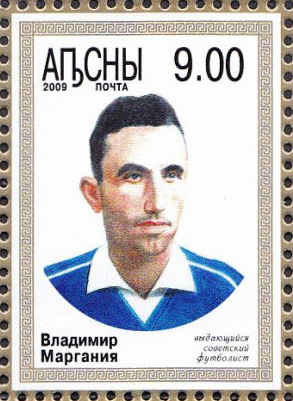
- Margania on a 2009 stamp of Abkhazia

Personal information
- Full name: Vladimir Margania
- Date of birth: 8 February 1928
- Place of birth: Gulripshi, Georgian SSR
- Date of death: 6 September 1958 (aged 30)
- Place of death: Ochamchire, Georgian SSR
- Height: 1.75 m (5 ft 9 in)
- Position: Goalkeeper

Senior career*
Years	Team	Apps	(Gls)
1945	Dinamo Sokhumi	0	(0)
1946	Shakhtar Donetsk	5	(0)
1947–1958	Dinamo Tbilisi	180	(0)

International career
1952	USSR	0	(0)
- * Club domestic league appearances and goals

Vladimir Margania (Georgian: ვლადიმერ მარღანია; 8 February 1928 – 6 September 1958) was a Georgian and Soviet football player. He was a reserve goalkeeper of the Soviet Union football team that took part in the 1952 Summer Olympics.

Margania died in a car accident at the age of 30.
