= Sayed Mohamed (footballer) =

Egyptian footballer (1920-1965)

Personal information
- Full name: Abdel Azim Sayed Mohamed
- Date of birth: 23 March 1920
- Date of death: Prior to 1965
- Position: Forward

International career
Years	Team	Apps	(Gls)
- Egypt

Sayed Mohamed (23 March 1920 - prior to 1965) was an Egyptian footballer. He competed in the men's tournament at the 1952 Summer Olympics.
