= Leslie Stratton =

English footballer

Personal information
- Full name: Leslie Eugene Stratton
- Date of birth: 10 April 1925
- Place of birth: West Ham, England
- Date of death: December 1978 (aged 53)

Senior career*
Years	Team	Apps	(Gls)
- Walthamstow Avenue

International career
1952	Great Britain	1	(0)
- * Club domestic league appearances and goals

Leslie Eugene Stratton (10 April 1925 – December 1978) was an English footballer who represented Great Britain at the 1952 Summer Olympics. He played club football for Walthamstow Avenue.
