= Luis Leal (footballer, born 1929) =

Chilean footballer

Personal information
- Date of birth: 21 July 1929
- Date of death: 12 July 2013 (aged 83)
- Position: Defender

International career
Years	Team	Apps	(Gls)
1952	Chile Olympic		

Luis Leal (21 July 1929 – 12 July 2013) was a Chilean footballer. He competed in the men's tournament at the 1952 Summer Olympics.
