= Macit Gürdal =

Turkish footballer

Personal information
- Date of birth: 12 June 1930
- Date of death: 29 April 2007
- Position: Forward

International career
Years	Team	Apps	(Gls)
- Turkey

Macit Gürdal (12 June 1930 - 29 Nisan 2007) was a Turkish former footballer. He competed in the men's tournament at the 1952 Summer Olympics. He was the coach of various Turkish football teams from 1969 to 1996.
