= IBSF World Championships 2019 =

Bobsleigh and skeleton competition

2019 World Championships
- Venue: Whistler Sliding Centre
- Location: Whistler, Canada
- Dates: February 25 – March 10

The 2019 IBSF World Championships were held in Whistler, Canada from February 25 to March 10, 2019.

This would be the last World Championships with the mixed-sleds mixed team event – consisting of one run each of men's skeleton, women's skeleton, 2-man bobsleigh, and 2-women bobsleigh – first introduced at the 2007 championships. The 2020 championships would see the introduction of a skeleton-only mixed team event, consisting of one run each of men's and women's skeleton.

== Schedule ==
Six events were held.

All times are local (UTC−8).

Bobsleigh

Date	Time	Events
1 March	17:00	Two-men run 1 & 2
2 March	11:30	Two-women run 1 & 2
2 March	17:00	Two-men run 3 & 4
3 March	11:30	Two-women run 3 & 4
8 March	17:00	Four-men run 1 & 2
9 March	17:00	Four-men run 3 & 4

Team Event

Date	Time	Events
3 March	16.00	Mixed Team

Skeleton

Date	Time	Events
7 March	09:00	Men run 1 & 2
7 March	12:30	Women run 1 & 2
8 March	09:00	Men run 3 & 4
8 March	12:30	Women run 3 & 4

== Medal summary ==
=== Medal table ===
* Host nation (Canada)

Rank	Nation	Gold	Silver	Bronze	Total
1	Germany (GER)	5	2	2	9
2	Latvia (LAT)	1	1	0	2
3	Canada (CAN)*	0	2	2	4
4	Russia (RUS)	0	1	0	1
5	South Korea (KOR)	0	0	1	1
5	United States (USA)	0	0	1	1
Totals (6 entries)		6	6	6	18

=== Bobsleigh ===
Event	Gold		Silver		Bronze	
Two-man	Germany; Francesco Friedrich; Thorsten Margis	3:24.54	Canada; Justin Kripps; Cameron Stones	3:25.13	Germany; Nico Walther; Paul Krenz	3:25.43
Two-woman	Germany; Mariama Jamanka; Annika Drazek	3:30.08	Germany; Stephanie Schneider; Ann-Christin Strack	3:31.14	Canada; Christine de Bruin; Kristen Bujnowski	3:31.25
Four-man	Germany; Francesco Friedrich; Arndt Bauer; Martin Grothkopp; Thorsten Margis	3:21.33	Latvia; Oskars Ķibermanis; Matīss Miknis; Arvis Vilkaste; Jānis Strenga	3:21.62	Canada; Justin Kripps; Ryan Sommer; Cameron Stones; Ben Coakwell	3:21.78

=== Skeleton ===
Event	Gold		Silver		Bronze	
Men	Martins Dukurs; Latvia	3:28.11	Nikita Tregubov; Russia	3:28.62	Yun Sung-bin; South Korea	3:28.99
Women	Tina Hermann; Germany	3:33.03	Jacqueline Lölling; Germany	3:33.41	Sophia Griebel; Germany	3:34.20

=== Mixed ===
Event	Gold		Silver		Bronze	
Mixed team	Germany; Christopher Grotheer; Anna Köhler; Lisa Sophie Gericke; Sophia Griebel; Johannes Lochner; Marc Rademacher	3:31.85	Canada; Dave Greszczyszyn; Christine de Bruin; Kristen Bujnowski; Mirela Rahneva; Nick Poloniato; Keefer Joyce	3:32.00	United States; Greg West; Brittany Reinbolt; Jessica Davis; Savannah Graybill; Geoffrey Gadbois; Kristopher Horn	3:32.49
