= List of Luxembourg international footballers =

The Luxembourg national football team represents the nation of Luxembourg in international association football. It is controlled by the Luxembourg Football Federation, the governing body of football in Luxembourg, and competes as a member of UEFA.

Luxembourg played their first ever international match on 29 October 1911, in a friendly match against France; it resulted in a 1–4 defeat.

== List of Luxembourg international footballers ==
The following is a list of all players who have played for Luxembourg in an official, senior international match and earning more than 20 caps.

All statistics are correct up to and including the match played on 16 November 2026 against Iceland. The most recent match is highlighted in yellow.

Luxembourg national football team players with more than 20 caps
| Player | Pos. | Caps | Goals | Debut | | Last or most recent match | |
| Player | Pos. | Caps | Goals | Date | Opponent | Date | Opponent |
|---|---|---|---|---|---|---|---|
| Laurent Jans | DF | 128 | 1 | October 16, 2012 | Israel | November 16, 2026 | Iceland |
| Mario Mutsch | MF | 102 | 4 | October 8, 2005 | Russia | June 2, 2019 | Madagascar |
| Daniel da Mota | MF | 101 | 7 | June 2, 2007 | Albania | June 6, 2021 | Scotland |
| Lars Gerson | DF | 100 | 4 | March 26, 2008 | Wales | June 10, 2025 | Republic of Ireland |
| Jeff Strasser | DF | 98 | 7 | October 12, 1993 | Greece | October 12, 2010 | France |
| René Peters | MF | 93 | 4 | April 26, 2000 | Estonia | October 15, 2013 | Portugal |
| Jonathan Joubert | GK | 90 | | June 3, 2006 | Portugal | October 10, 2017 | Bulgaria |
| Eric Hoffmann | DF | 89 | 0 | March 27, 2002 | Latvia | March 5, 2014 | Cape Verde |
| Carlo Weis | DF | 88 | 1 | February 28, 1978 | France | May 31, 1998 | Cameroon |
| Anthony Moris | GK | 88 | | May 26, 2014 | Belgium | November 16, 2026 | Iceland |
| Danel Sinani | MF | 83 | 16 | September 3, 2017 | France | September 26, 2026 | Bulgaria |
| Christopher Martins | MF | 83 | 1 | September 8, 2014 | Belarus | June 6, 2026 | Albania |
| Aurélien Joachim | FW | 80 | 15 | September 7, 2005 | Liechtenstein | November 17, 2019 | Portugal |
| François Konter | DF | 78 | 4 | April 20, 1952 | Switzerland | April 23, 1969 | Bulgaria |
| Dirk Carlson | DF | 78 | 0 | September 2, 2016 | Latvia | November 16, 2026 | Iceland |
| Leandro Barreiro | DF | 75 | 3 | March 22, 2018 | Malta | September 29, 2026 | Iceland |
| Roby Langers | FW | 73 | 8 | September 10, 1980 | Yugoslavia | May 31, 1998 | Cameroon |
| Ben Payal | MF | 73 | 0 | September 6, 2006 | Latvia | March 29, 2016 | Albania |
| Gerson Rodrigues | FW | 72 | 23 | March 25, 2017 | France | June 10, 2025 | Republic of Ireland |
| Maxime Chanot | DF | 72 | 4 | June 7, 2013 | Azerbaijan | September 8, 2024 | Belarus |
| Manuel Cardoni | MF | 69 | 5 | May 20, 1993 | Iceland | October 13, 2004 | Liechtenstein |
| Florian Bohnert | MF | 69 | 1 | May 31, 2016 | Nigeria | November 16, 2026 | Iceland |
| Vincent Thill | MF | 67 | 6 | March 25, 2016 | Bosnia and Herzegovina | November 16, 2026 | Iceland |
| Erny Brenner | DF | 67 | 5 | April 10, 1955 | Portugal | September 19, 1965 | Yugoslavia |
| Gilbert Dresch | FW | 64 | 1 | April 8, 1975 | Netherlands | September 9, 1987 | Republic of Ireland |
| Marcel Bossi | DF | 63 | 0 | September 10, 1980 | Yugoslavia | October 27, 1993 | Hungary |
| Jeff Saibene | MF | 63 | 0 | October 14, 1986 | Belgium | October 6, 2001 | Yugoslavia |
| Maurice Deville | FW | 61 | 3 | November 15, 2011 | Switzerland | June 14, 2022 | Faroe Islands |
| Mathias Jänisch | DF | 59 | 1 | March 28, 2009 | Latvia | November 15, 2018 | Belarus |
| Jean-Paul Girres | MF | 58 | 2 | September 10, 1980 | Yugoslavia | October 28, 1992 | Russia |
| Gilles Bettmer | MF | 58 | 1 | November 16, 2005 | Canada | March 26, 2013 | Finland |
| Nicolas Kettel | FW | 57 | 15 | February 23, 1946 | Belgium | October 4, 1959 | Netherlands |
| Fernand Brosius | DF | 57 | 0 | September 30, 1956 | Austria | March 20, 1966 | Italy |
| Chris Philipps | DF | 57 | 0 | February 29, 2012 | Macedonia | June 8, 2024 | Belgium |
| Stefano Bensi | FW | 55 | 5 | October 11, 2008 | Israel | November 17, 2020 | Azerbaijan |
| Paul Philipp | MF | 55 | 4 | November 20, 1968 | Denmark | April 27, 1982 | France |
| Guy Hellers | MF | 55 | 2 | October 9, 1982 | Greece | October 11, 1997 | Cyprus |
| Luc Holtz | MF | 55 | 1 | October 12, 1991 | Portugal | October 16, 2002 | Romania |
| Hubert Meunier | DF | 55 | 0 | October 7, 1978 | France | June 1, 1989 | Belgium |
| Jeannot Moes | GK | 55 | | November 15, 1970 | East Germany | March 27, 1983 | Hungary |
| Léon Letsch | FW | 53 | 11 | May 4, 1947 | Belgium | May 11, 1961 | France |
| Fons Leweck | MF | 53 | 4 | February 13, 2002 | Albania | October 14, 2009 | Greece |
| Marc Birsens | DF | 53 | 1 | April 27, 1988 | Italy | February 23, 2000 | Northern Ireland |
| David Turpel | FW | 52 | 6 | November 14, 2012 | Scotland | November 17, 2019 | Portugal |
| Sébastien Rémy | MF | 52 | 0 | August 21, 2002 | Morocco | May 27, 2008 | Cape Verde |
| Sébastien Thill | MF | 51 | 2 | September 5, 2015 | Macedonia | November 13, 2026 | Estonia |
| Louis Pilot | MF | 50 | 7 | November 11, 1959 | France | May 26, 1977 | Finland |
| Nicky Hoffmann | DF | 50 | 2 | October 2, 1960 | Belgium | April 26, 1972 | Czechoslovakia |
| Jeannot Reiter | FW | 49 | 5 | September 21, 1977 | Switzerland | November 15, 1989 | Switzerland |
| Enes Mahmutović | DF | 49 | 0 | November 13, 2016 | Netherlands | November 16, 2026 | Iceland |
| Olivier Thill | MF | 48 | 3 | August 31, 2017 | Belarus | November 17, 2025 | Northern Ireland |
| Tom Schnell | DF | 48 | 0 | October 9, 2004 | Russia | March 25, 2016 | Bosnia and Herzegovina |
| Théo Malget | DF | 47 | 3 | April 27, 1982 | France | October 27, 1993 | Hungary |
| Daniel Huss | FW | 46 | 3 | April 26, 2000 | Estonia | September 12, 2007 | Bulgaria |
| Benny Michaux | GK | 46 | | May 13, 1945 | Belgium | September 11, 1957 | Netherlands |
| Ady Schmit | MF | 45 | 7 | November 11, 1959 | France | November 15, 1970 | East Germany |
| Mathias Olesen | MF | 45 | 2 | November 11, 2021 | Azerbaijan | November 16, 2026 | Iceland |
| Marvin Martins | DF | 44 | 3 | June 4, 2014 | Italy | September 29, 2026 | Iceland |
| Mica Pinto | DF | 43 | 1 | October 7, 2020 | Liechtenstein | June 6, 2026 | Albania |
| John van Rijswijck | GK | 43 | | May 1, 1984 | Norway | May 20, 1993 | Iceland |
| Camille Wagner | DF | 42 | 2 | March 27, 1948 | Netherlands | January 16, 1955 | Belgium |
| Nico Braun | FW | 40 | 9 | April 16, 1970 | France | March 26, 1980 | Uruguay |
| Kim Kintziger | DF | 40 | 1 | October 12, 2005 | Estonia | November 17, 2010 | Algeria |
| Charles Leweck | DF | 40 | 0 | February 24, 2004 | Faroe Islands | March 26, 2013 | Finland |
| Gilbert Dussier | FW | 39 | 9 | February 24, 1971 | Netherlands | October 7, 1978 | France |
| Manou Schauls | DF | 39 | 1 | September 4, 1999 | England | March 30, 2005 | Latvia |
| Jim Hoffstetter | DF | 39 | 0 | March 27, 1960 | Switzerland | December 23, 1967 | France |
| Marcel Di Domenico | FW | 38 | 2 | October 7, 1973 | Canada | December 15, 1982 | England |
| Henri Cirelli | MF | 37 | 6 | September 30, 1956 | Austria | February 17, 1965 | Austria |
| Claude Reiter | DF | 37 | 1 | April 26, 2000 | Estonia | October 11, 2008 | Israel |
| René Flenghi | DF | 37 | 0 | January 4, 1970 | Malta | September 22, 1976 | Finland |
| Jean-Pierre Vanek | DF | 36 | 2 | October 12, 1994 | Belarus | September 5, 2002 | Israel |
| Kevin Malget | DF | 36 | 2 | June 4, 2010 | Faroe Islands | September 7, 2021 | Qatar |
| Joël Groff | MF | 36 | 0 | October 11, 1989 | Portugal | June 5, 1998 | Germany |
| Fernand Jeitz | DF | 36 | 0 | October 21, 1964 | Belgium | April 8, 1973 | Switzerland |
| Frank Deville | MF | 35 | 0 | February 14, 1995 | Israel | October 16, 2002 | Romania |
| Joseph Fischer | MF | 35 | 0 | November 6, 1932 | Switzerland | April 7, 1940 | Belgium |
| Fernand Guth | FW | 35 | 0 | May 24, 1947 | Scotland | May 6, 1953 | Spain |
| René Hoffmann | GK | 35 | | May 11, 1961 | France | October 15, 1975 | Austria |
| Gordon Braun | FW | 34 | 1 | May 31, 1998 | Cameroon | October 13, 2004 | Liechtenstein |
| François Dumont | DF | 34 | 0 | November 8, 1936 | Switzerland | May 24, 1947 | Scotland |
| Tom Laterza | DF | 34 | 0 | October 10, 2009 | Switzerland | September 2, 2016 | Latvia |
| Robert Mond | DF | 33 | 3 | March 13, 1949 | Belgium | November 11, 1959 | France |
| Nico Wagner | MF | 33 | 1 | February 25, 1979 | France | February 5, 1986 | Portugal |
| Johny Hoffmann | DF | 33 | 0 | October 21, 1964 | Belgium | October 7, 1972 | Italy |
| Dany Theis | MF | 33 | 0 | October 12, 1991 | Portugal | October 6, 2001 | Yugoslavia |
| Dan Collette | DF | 33 | 0 | February 24, 2004 | Faroe Islands | February 5, 2013 | Armenia |
| Johny Léonard | FW | 32 | 8 | November 11, 1962 | Netherlands | November 15, 1970 | East Germany |
| Paul Koch | GK | 32 | | March 28, 1990 | Iceland | November 18, 1998 | Belgium |
| Paul Steffen | GK | 32 | | October 28, 1953 | Republic of Ireland | December 22, 1962 | Switzerland |
| Jean Klein | MF | 31 | 4 | April 7, 1963 | Italy | March 26, 1969 | Netherlands |
| Josy Kirchens | FW | 31 | 3 | September 29, 1965 | Netherlands | April 26, 1972 | Czechoslovakia |
| Vic Feller | MF | 30 | 5 | February 23, 1946 | Belgium | May 22, 1952 | France |
| Romain Michaux | DF | 30 | 1 | November 12, 1975 | West Germany | October 13, 1984 | France |
| Guy Blaise | DF | 30 | 0 | August 12, 2009 | Lithuania | February 5, 2013 | Armenia |
| François Müller | FW | 29 | 12 | March 13, 1949 | Belgium | October 9, 1955 | Switzerland |
| Yvandro Borges Sanches | MF | 29 | 3 | September 4, 2021 | Serbia | March 31, 2026 | Malta |
| Joël Kitenge | DF | 29 | 2 | October 12, 2005 | Estonia | September 2, 2011 | Romania |
| René Schneider | MF | 29 | 1 | June 17, 1959 | Norway | October 23, 1966 | Belgium |
| Alija Bešić | GK | 29 | | February 23, 2000 | Northern Ireland | November 17, 2004 | Portugal |
| Pierre Petry | DF | 29 | 0 | October 13, 1984 | France | October 27, 1993 | Hungary |
| Marcel Christophe | FW | 28 | 3 | October 10, 1998 | Poland | November 20, 2003 | Moldova |
| Edy Dublin | MF | 28 | 3 | May 27, 1965 | Norway | March 10, 1970 | Netherlands |
| Sacha Schneider | MF | 28 | 1 | February 14, 1995 | Israel | April 2, 2003 | Norway |
| Erwin Kuffer | DF | 28 | 0 | February 17, 1965 | Austria | November 15, 1970 | East Germany |
| Ferd Lahure | GK | 28 | | March 13, 1949 | Belgium | November 11, 1959 | France |
| Victor Majerus | DF | 28 | 0 | January 21, 1934 | Belgium | April 30, 1939 | Belgium |
| Patrick Posing | MF | 28 | 0 | October 8, 1996 | Bulgaria | August 19, 2003 | Malta |
| Nico Rohmann | DF | 28 | 0 | September 3, 1974 | West Germany | May 18, 1985 | East Germany |
| Enschy Mengel | FW | 27 | 8 | February 25, 1934 | Belgium | March 10, 1946 | Netherlands |
| Jim Hoscheid | GK | 27 | | March 17, 1935 | France | May 14, 1939 | Switzerland |
| Nicolas May | MF | 27 | 0 | July 26, 1948 | Afghanistan | January 16, 1955 | Belgium |
| Louis Trierweiler | MF | 27 | 0 | April 16, 1970 | France | October 19, 1975 | Hungary |
| Ben Federspiel | DF | 27 | 0 | November 20, 2002 | Cape Verde | September 6, 2006 | Latvia |
| Aldin Skenderović | DF | 27 | 0 | August 31, 2017 | Belarus | September 22, 2022 | Turkey |
| Jules Gales | MF | 26 | 11 | May 2, 1948 | Austria | July 20, 1952 | Brazil |
| Jean-Pierre Barboni | MF | 26 | 0 | October 12, 1983 | Denmark | April 27, 1988 | Italy |
| Ralph Ferron | DF | 26 | 0 | May 20, 1993 | Iceland | October 16, 2002 | Romania |
| Joé Hansen | DF | 26 | 0 | May 5, 1971 | Austria | September 22, 1976 | Finland |
| Gérard Jeitz | MF | 26 | 0 | November 16, 1983 | England | December 18, 1991 | Germany |
| Arnold Kieffer | DF | 26 | 0 | February 14, 1932 | Switzerland | May 24, 1947 | Scotland |
| Théo Stendebach | GK | 26 | | June 17, 1959 | Norway | November 17, 1971 | Netherlands |
| Jean Zuang | DF | 26 | 0 | September 3, 1974 | West Germany | January 28, 1981 | Greece |
| Jean-Louis Margue | DF | 25 | 1 | March 16, 1975 | Austria | November 24, 1979 | Czechoslovakia |
| Claudio Lombardelli | MF | 25 | 0 | June 3, 2006 | Portugal | September 9, 2009 | Israel |
| Léon Mart | FW | 24 | 16 | June 4, 1933 | France | March 10, 1946 | Netherlands |
| Camille Libar | FW | 24 | 13 | November 28, 1937 | Netherlands | May 21, 1950 | England |
| Mathias Becker | MF | 24 | 6 | May 21, 1927 | England | April 25, 1937 | Italy |
| Paul May | MF | 24 | 4 | November 11, 1958 | Belgium | February 17, 1965 | Austria |
| Marcel Rewenig | FW | 24 | 2 | May 5, 1946 | Belgium | April 20, 1952 | Switzerland |
| Roger Fandel | DF | 24 | 0 | December 10, 1972 | Turkey | May 1, 1979 | Czechoslovakia |
| Camille Dimmer | FW | 23 | 8 | September 29, 1957 | Austria | January 29, 1967 | Spain |
| Seid Korać | DF | 23 | 2 | November 11, 2020 | Austria | June 6, 2026 | Albania |
| Robert Feyder | DF | 23 | 0 | April 11, 1937 | Belgium | May 6, 1948 | Belgium |
| Edvin Muratović | FW | 22 | 1 | October 7, 2020 | Liechtenstein | June 6, 2026 | Albania |
| Tomás Moreira | MF | 22 | 1 | October 15, 2024 | Belarus | November 16, 2026 | Iceland |
| Gusty Kemp | FW | 21 | 15 | April 26, 1936 | Belgium | May 27, 1945 | France |
| Albert Schaack | FW | 21 | 4 | May 9, 1954 | Belgium | November 11, 1959 | France |
| Nic Pauly | DF | 21 | 1 | May 13, 1945 | Belgium | April 16, 1950 | Belgium |
| Michel Reuter | DF | 21 | 1 | March 19, 1950 | Switzerland | June 17, 1959 | Norway |
| Théo Scholten | MF | 21 | 0 | June 9, 1984 | Portugal | March 28, 1990 | Iceland |
| Pierre Bommertz | MF | 20 | 4 | December 5, 1926 | Belgium | November 28, 1937 | Netherlands |
| Jean-Pierre Mertl | DF | 20 | 1 | December 23, 1951 | West Germany | October 19, 1960 | England |
| Alessio Curci | ST | 20 | 1 | November 17, 2022 | Hungary | June 3, 2026 | Italy |
| Stéphane Gillet | GK | 20 | | October 11, 2000 | Russia | November 15, 2006 | Togo |
| Carlos Ferreira | MF | 20 | 0 | March 30, 2005 | Latvia | November 14, 2009 | Iceland |

== See also ==
- Category:Luxembourg men's international footballers
- Luxembourg national football team#Current squad
