= 1954 FIFA World Cup qualification Group 4 =

Football tournament qualifying stage

The three teams in this group played against each other on a home-and-away basis. The group winner France qualified for the fifth FIFA World Cup held in Switzerland.

== Results ==
20 September 1953	Luxembourg	1 – 6	France	Luxembourg, Luxembourg
	Kohn 6'	Report	Piantoni 5'; Kopa 10'; Cicci 41'; Glovacki 44'; Kargu 73'; Flamion 88'	Stadium: Stade Municipal; Referee: Dörflinger (Switzerland)

4 October 1953	Republic of Ireland	3 – 5	France	Dublin, Republic of Ireland
	Ryan 58' (pen.); Walsh 83'; O'Farrell 88'	Report	Glovacki 23'; Penverne 40'; Ujlaki 50', 69'; Flamion 72'	Stadium: Dalymount Park; Referee: Franken (Belgium)

28 October 1953	Republic of Ireland	4 – 0	Luxembourg	Dublin, Republic of Ireland
	Fitzsimons 14' 83'; Ryan 48' (pen.); Eglington 59'	Report		Stadium: Dalymount Park; Referee: Bond (England)

25 November 1953	France	1 – 0	Republic of Ireland	Paris, France
	Piantoni 73'	Report		Stadium: Parc des Princes; Referee: Van Nuffel (Belgium)

17 December 1953	France	8 – 0	Luxembourg	Paris, France
	Desgranges 2', 88'; Vincent 6', 10'; Fontaine 21', 75', 80'; Foix 57'	Report		Stadium: Parc des Princes; Referee: Roeykens (Belgium)

7 March 1954	Luxembourg	0 – 1	Republic of Ireland	Luxembourg, Luxembourg
		Report	Cummins 67'	Stadium: Stade Municipal; Referee: Ausum (Netherlands)

France qualified.

== Final Table ==
Final table													Home							Away						
Rank	Team	Pld	W	D	L	GF	GA	GD	Pts	(France)	(Republic of Ireland)	(Luxembourg)	Pld	W	D	L	GF	GA	Pts	Pld	W	D	L	GF	GA	Pts
1.	France	4	4	0	0	20	4	+16	8	X	1:0	8:0	2	2	0	0	9	0	4	2	2	0	0	11	4	4
2.	Republic of Ireland	4	2	0	2	8	6	+2	4	3:5	X	4:0	2	1	0	1	7	5	2	2	1	0	1	1	1	2
3.	Luxembourg	4	0	0	4	1	19	-18	0	1:6	0:1	X	2	0	0	2	1	7	0	2	0	0	2	0	12	0

== Team stats ==
=== France ===
Head coach: none, selected by committee

Pos.	Player	DoB	Games played	Goals	Minutes played	Sub off	Sub on	(Luxembourg)	(Republic of Ireland)	(Republic of Ireland)	(Luxembourg)	Club
FW	Abdesselem Ben Mohammed	January 2, 1926	1	0	90	0	0	-	-	90	-	(France) Girondins Bordeaux
GK	Pierre Bernard	June 27, 1932	0	0	0	0	0	-	-	-	B	(France) Girondins Bordeaux
MF	Guillaume Bieganski	November 3, 1932	1	0	90	0	0	-	-	-	90	(France) Lille O.S.C.
DF	Marius Bruat	June 27, 1930	1	0	90	0	0	-	-	-	90	(France) FC Sochaux
MF	Raymond Cicci	August 11, 1929	1	1	90	0	0	90	-	-	-	(France) Stade Reims
MF	Antoine Cuissard	July 19, 1924	1	0	90	0	0	-	-	90	-	(France) OGC Nice
GK	Stéphane Dakowski	June 29, 1921	0	0	0	0	0	-	-	B	-	(France) Nîmes Olympique
FW	Léon Deladerrière	June 29, 1927	1	0	90	0	0	-	-	90	-	(France) FC Nancy
FW	Jean Desgranges	April 22, 1929	1	2	90	0	0	-	-	-	90	(France) RC Lens
FW	Ferry	September 2, 1930	0	0	0	0	0	B	-	-	-	(France) AS Saint-Étienne
FW	Pierre Flamion	December 13, 1924	2	2	180	0	0	90	90	-	-	(France) Troyes AC
FW	Jacques Foix	November 26, 1930	1	1	90	0	0	-	-	-	90	(France) AS Saint-Étienne
FW	Just Fontaine	August 18, 1933	1	3	90	0	0	-	-	-	90	(France) OGC Nice
DF	Lazare Gianessi	November 9, 1925	3	0	270	0	0	90	90	90	-	(France) AS Monaco
MF	Léon Glovacki	February 19, 1928	2	2	180	0	0	90	90	-	-	(France) Stade Reims
DF	Robert Jonquet	May 3, 1925	2	0	180	0	0	90	90	-	-	(France) Stade Reims
FW	Édouard Kargu	December 16, 1925	1	1	90	0	0	90	B	-	-	(France) Girondins Bordeaux
FW	Raymond Kopa	October 13, 1931	2	1	180	0	0	90	90	-	-	(France) Stade Reims
GK	Jean-Pierre Kress	March 1, 1930	1	0	90	0	0	-	-	-	90	(France) RC Strasbourg
DF	Robert Lemaître	March 7, 1929	1	0	90	0	0	-	-	-	90	(France) Lille O.S.C.
DF	André Lerond	December 6, 1930	0	0	0	0	0	-	-	-	B	(France) Olympique Lyonnais
MF	Abderrahman Mahjoub	April 25, 1929	1	0	90	0	0	-	-	-	90	(France) OGC Nice
MF	Jean-Jacques Marcel	June 13, 1931	2	0	180	0	0	-	90	90	-	(France) FC Sochaux
DF	Roger Marche	March 5, 1924	3	0	270	0	0	90	90	90	-	(France) Stade Reims
DF	Ahmed Mihoubi	June 2, 1924	1	1	90	0	0	-	-	90	-	(France) Toulouse FC
FW	Célestin Oliver	July 12, 1930	1	0	90	0	0	-	-	-	90	(France) UA Sedan-Torcy
DF	Antoine Pazur	January 3, 1931	1	0	90	0	0	-	-	-	90	(France) Lille O.S.C.
DF	Armand Penverne	November 26, 1926	2	1	180	0	0	90	90	-	-	(France) Stade Reims
MF	Roger Piantoni	December 26, 1931	3	2	270	0	0	90	90	90	-	(France) FC Nancy
DF	René Pleimelding	February 13, 1925	0	0	0	0	0	B	B	B	-	(France) Toulouse FC
GK	François Remetter	August 8, 1928	2	0	172	0	1	82	B	90	-	(France) FC Metz
MF	André Strappe	February 23, 1928	1	0	90	0	0	-	-	90	-	(France) Lille O.S.C.
MF	Joseph Ujlaki	August 10, 1929	2	2	180	0	0	-	90	90	-	(France) OGC Nice
GK	René Vignal	August 12, 1926	2	0	98	1	0	8	90	-	-	(France) RCF Paris
FW	Jean Vincent	November 29, 1930	1	2	90	0	0	-	-	-	90	(France) Lille O.S.C.
FW	Raymond Wozniesko	January 17, 1930	0	0	0	0	0	-	-	-	B	(France) Girondins Bordeaux

=== Republic of Ireland ===
Head coach: none, selected by committee, team manager: (Republic of Ireland) Alex Stevenson

Pos.	Player	DoB	Games played	Goals	Minutes played	Sub off	Sub on	(France)	(Luxembourg)	(France)	(Luxembourg)	Club
DF	Tom Aherne	January 26, 1919	1	0	90	0	0	90	-	-	-	(England) /2 Luton Town
MF	Noel Cantwell	February 28, 1932	1	0	90	0	0	-	90	-	-	(England) /2 West Ham United
DF	Tommy Clinton	April 13, 1926	2	0	180	0	0	-	-	90	90	(England) /2 Everton F.C.
FW	George Cummins	March 12, 1931	2	1	180	0	0	-	90	-	90	(England) /2 Luton Town
DF	Seamus Dunne	April 13, 1930	2	0	180	0	0	90	90	-	-	(England) /2 Luton Town
FW	Tommy Eglington	January 15, 1923	3	1	270	0	0	90	90	90	-	(England) /2 Everton F.C.
DF/MF	Peter Farrell	August 16, 1922	2	0	180	0	0	90	-	90	-	(England) /2 Everton F.C.
FW	Arthur Fitzsimons	December 16, 1929	3	2	270	0	0	90	90	90	-	(England) Middlesbrough F.C.
DF	Mick Gallagher		1	0	90	0	0	-	-	-	90	(Scotland) Hibernian F.C.
DF	Eddie Gannon	January 3, 1921	2	0	180	0	0	-	90	90	-	(England) Sheffield Wednesday
FW	Johnny Gavin	April 20, 1928	1	0	180	0	0	-	-	-	90	(England) /3 Norwich City
FW	Shay Gibbons	May 19, 1929	1	0	90	0	0	-	90	-	-	(Republic of Ireland) St Patrick's Athletic
FW	Jimmy Hartnett	March 21, 1927	1	0	90	0	0	-	-	-	90	(England) Middlesbrough F.C.
FW	Freddie Kearns	November 8, 1927	1	0	90	0	0	-	-	-	90	(England) /2 West Ham United
MF	Noel Kelly	December 28, 1921	1	0	90	0	0	-	-	-	90	(England) /2 Nottingham Forest
DF	Robin Lawler	August 28, 1925	2	0	180	0	0	-	90	90	-	(England) /2 Fulham F.C.
MF	Con Martin	March 20, 1923	3	0	270	0	0	90	-	90	90	(England) Aston Villa
FW	Tommy Moroney	November 10, 1923	1	0	90	0	0	90	-	-	-	(Republic of Ireland) Evergreen United
FW	Liam Munroe	November 15, 1930	1	0	90	0	0	-	90	-	-	(Republic of Ireland) Shamrock Rovers
MF	Frank O'Farrell	October 9, 1927	1	0	90	0	0	90	-	-	-	(England) /2 West Ham United
GK	Jimmy O'Neill	October 13, 1931	3	0	270	0	0	90	90	90	-	(England) /2 Everton F.C.
FW	Alf Ringstead	October 14, 1927	1	0	90	0	0	-	-	90	-	(England) Sheffield United
MF	Reg Ryan	February 13, 1925	3	2	270	0	0	90	90	90	-	(England) West Bromwich Albion
MF	Pat Saward	August 17, 1928	1	0	90	0	0	-	-	-	90	(England) /3 Millwall F.C.
GK	Tom Scannell	June 3, 1925	1	0	90	0	0	-	-	-	90	(England) /3 Southend United
DF	Tommy Traynor	July 22, 1933	1	0	90	0	0	-	-	-	90	(England) /3 Southampton F.C.
FW	Davy Walsh	April 28, 1923	2	0	180	0	0	90	-	90	-	(England) Aston Villa

=== Luxembourg ===
Head coach: (Hungary) Béla Volentik

Pos.	Player	DoB	Games played	Goals	Minutes played	Sub off	Sub on	(France)	(Republic of Ireland)	(France)	(Republic of Ireland)	Club
DF	Secondo Caldarelli	August 13, 1923	1	0	90	0	0	-	-	-	90	(Luxembourg) Progrès Niederkorn
DF	Henri Fickinger	July 25, 1930	3	0	270	0	0	90	90	90	-	(Luxembourg) Progrès Niederkorn
MF	Fernand Guth	May 3, 1926	0	0	0	0	0	B	-	-	-	Union Luxembourg
FW	Jos Hansen	June 8, 1932	1	0	90	0	0	90	-	B	-	(Luxembourg) The National Schifflange
FW	Lucien Karier	July 7, 1923	1	0	90	0	0	-	-	-	90	(Luxembourg) The Belval Belvaux
FW	Paul Kemp	September 27, 1930	3	0	270	0	0	90	90	90	-	Union Luxembourg
GK	Théo Kemp	September 25, 1931	0	0	0	0	0	-	-	B	B	(Luxembourg) Red Boys Differdange
FW	Antoine Kohn	November 1, 1933	4	1	360	0	0	90	90	90	90	(Luxembourg) Jeunesse Esch
GK	Ferdy Lahure	March 28, 1929	1	0	90	0	0	90	B	-	-	(Luxembourg) Progrès Niederkorn
DF	Roger Lorang	November 22, 1930	1	0	90	0	0	-	90	-	-	Union Luxembourg
DF	Nicolas May	September 30, 1927	3	0	270	0	0	-	90	90	90	(Luxembourg) Red Boys Differdange
DF	Jean-Pierre Mertl	April 23, 1930	1	0	90	0	0	90	-	-	B	Union Luxembourg
MF	Jules Meurisse	May 3, 1931	3	0	270	0	0	-	90	90	90	(Luxembourg) Jeunesse Esch
DF	Robert Mond	December 13, 1927	0	0	0	0	0	-	-	B	-	(Luxembourg) Jeunesse Esch
DF	Josy Mosar	September 16, 1927	1	0	90	0	0	-	-	-	90	(Luxembourg) Red Star Merl
MF	Armand Müller	July 26, 1928	0	0	0	0	0	-	-	-	B	(Luxembourg) AS Differdange
MF	François Müller	February 23, 1927	1	0	90	0	0	90	-	-	-	(Luxembourg) Red Star Merl
MF	Guillaume Peiffer	May 2, 1928	1	0	90	0	0	-	B	B	90	(Luxembourg) Fola Esch
DF	Michel Reuter	November 24, 1929	3	0	270	0	0	90	B	90	90	(Luxembourg) SC Tetingen
MF	Jos Roller	August 21, 1929	0	0	0	0	0	B	B	-	-	(Luxembourg) Progrès Niederkorn
DF	Léon Spartz	April 17, 1927	3	0	270	0	0	90	90	90	-	(Luxembourg) Red Boys Differdange
DF	Jacques Speck	November 5, 1931	2	0	180	0	0	B	90	90	-	(Luxembourg) The National Schifflange
GK	Paul Steffen	January 17, 1930	3	0	270	0	0	B	90	90	90	(Luxembourg) Jeunesse Esch
DF	Camille Wagner	April 13, 1925	4	0	360	0	0	90	90	90	90	(Luxembourg) FC Etzella Ettelbruck
FW	Roger Weydert	February 18, 1927	4	0	360	0	0	90	90	90	90	Union Luxembourg
