= List of Luxembourgish sports players =

This is a list of Luxembourgish sports players.

== Alpine skiing ==
- Marc Girardelli
- Raoul Weckbecker

== Auto racing ==
- Dylan Pereira

== Archery ==
- Jeff Henckels

== Athletics ==
- Josy Barthel (Middle-distance running)
- Roland Bombardella (Sprinting)
- David Fiegen (Middle-distance running)
- Norbert Haupert (Middle-distance running)
- Michel Théato (Marathon)

== Basketball ==
- Alvin Jones

== Bobsleigh ==
- Raoul Weckbecker

== Boxing ==
- Fernand Backes
- Fernand Ciatti
- Ray Cillien

== Carom billiards ==
- Fonsy Grethen

== Chess ==
- Alberto David

== Cycling ==
- Mett Clemens
- Bim Diederich
- François Faber
- Nicolas Frantz
- Charly Gaul
- Jean Goldschmit
- Benoît Joachim
- Willy Kemp
- Jeng Kirchen
- Kim Kirchen
- Jean Majerus
- Arsène Mersch
- François Neuens
- Andy Schleck
- Fränk Schleck
- Johny Schleck
- Jempy Schmitz
- Edy Schütz
- Christine Majerus

== Fencing ==
- Colette Flesch
- Robert Schiel

== Figure skating ==
- Fleur Maxwell

== Football ==
- Manuel Cardoni
- Dan Collette
- Stéphane Gillet
- Émile Hamilius
- Guy Hellers
- Daniel Huss
- Serge Jentgen
- Aurélien Joachim
- Antoine Kohn
- François Konter
- Robby Langers
- Alphonse Leweck
- Charles Leweck
- Léon Mart
- Luc Mischo
- Mario Mutsch
- Marc Oberweis
- Maité Machado Palma
- Ben Payal
- Paul Philipp
- Louis Pilot
- Claude Reiter
- Sébastien Rémy
- Chris Sagramola
- Danel Sinani
- Jeff Strasser
- Carlo Weis

== Gymnastics ==
- Josy Stoffel

== Mountaineering ==
- Eugène Berger

== Strongman ==
- Georges Christen

== Swimming ==
- Alwin de Prins

== Table tennis ==
- Jeanny Dom
- Ni Xialian

== Tennis ==
- Anne Kremer
- Mandy Minella
- Gilles Müller
- Claudine Schaul

== Triathlon ==
- Dirk Bockel
- Nancy Kemp-Arendt
- Elizabeth May

== Waterskiing ==
- Sylvie Hülsemann

== Weightlifting ==
- Joseph Alzin

== Wrestling ==
- Joseph Alzin
