= 2006 FIFA World Cup qualification – UEFA Group 3 =

Football tournament qualification stage

The 2006 FIFA World Cup qualification UEFA Group 3 was a UEFA qualifying group for the 2006 FIFA World Cup. The group comprised Estonia, Latvia, Liechtenstein, Luxembourg, Portugal, Russia and Slovakia.

The group was won by Portugal, who qualified for the 2006 FIFA World Cup. The runners-up Slovakia entered the UEFA qualification play-offs.

== Standings ==
Pos	Team	Pld	W	D	L	GF	GA	GD	Pts	Qualification	Portugal national football team	Slovakia national football team	Russia national football team	Estonia national football team	Latvia national football team	Liechtenstein national football team	Luxembourg national football team
1	Portugal	12	9	3	0	35	5	+30	30	Qualification to 2006 FIFA World Cup	—	2–0	7–1	4–0	3–0	2–1	6–0
2	Slovakia	12	6	5	1	24	8	+16	23	Advance to second round	1–1	—	0–0	1–0	4–1	7–0	3–1
3	Russia	12	6	5	1	23	12	+11	23		0–0	1–1	—	4–0	2–0	2–0	5–1
4	Estonia	12	5	2	5	16	17	−1	17		0–1	1–2	1–1	—	2–1	2–0	4–0
5	Latvia	12	4	3	5	18	21	−3	15		0–2	1–1	1–1	2–2	—	1–0	4–0
6	Liechtenstein	12	2	2	8	13	23	−10	8		2–2	0–0	1–2	1–2	1–3	—	3–0
7	Luxembourg	12	0	0	12	5	48	−43	0		0–5	0–4	0–4	0–2	3–4	0–4	—

Rules for classification: Tiebreakers

== Matches ==
18 August 2004
20:15

Liechtenstein	1–2	Estonia
D'Elia 49'	(Report)	Viikmäe 34'; Lindpere 80'

Rheinpark Stadion, Vaduz
Attendance: 912
Referee: Emil Bozinovski (Macedonia)
18 August 2004
20:15

Slovakia	3–1	Luxembourg
Vittek 26'; Greško 48'; Demo 89'	(Report)	Strasser 2'

Tehelné pole, Bratislava
Attendance: 5,016
Referee: Viktor Kassai (Hungary)

4 September 2004
18:00

Estonia	4–0	Luxembourg
Teever 7'; Schauls 41' (o.g.); Oper 61'; Viikmäe 67'	(Report)

Lilleküla Stadium, Tallinn
Attendance: 3,000
Referee: Alan Kelly (Ireland)
4 September 2004
19:00

Russia	1–1	Slovakia
Bulykin 14'	(Report)	Vittek 87'

Central Dynamo Stadium, Moscow
Attendance: 11,500
Referee: Manuel Mejuto González (Spain)
4 September 2004
20:15

Latvia	0–2	Portugal
	(Report)	Ronaldo 57'; Pauleta 58'

Skonto Stadium, Riga
Attendance: 9,500
Referee: Graham Poll (England)

8 September 2004
20:00

Luxembourg	3–4	Latvia
Braun 11'; A. Leweck 55'; Cardoni 62'	(Report)	Verpakovskis 4'; Zemļinskis 40' (pen.); Hoffmann 65' (o.g.); Prohorenkovs 67'

Stade Josy Barthel, Luxembourg City
Attendance: 2,125
Referee: George Kasnaferis (Greece)
8 September 2004
20:15

Slovakia	7–0	Liechtenstein
Vittek 15', 59', 81'; Karhan 42'; Németh 84'; Mintál 85'; Zabavník 90+2'	(Report)

Tehelné pole, Bratislava
Attendance: 5,620
Referee: Dejan Delević (Serbia and Montenegro)
8 September 2004
21:15

Portugal	4–0	Estonia
Ronaldo 75'; Postiga 83', 90+1'; Pauleta 86'	(Report)

Estádio Dr. Magalhães Pessoa, Leiria
Attendance: 27,214
Referee: Bülent Demirlek (Turkey)

9 October 2004
17:00

Luxembourg	0–4	Russia
	(Report)	Sychev 56', 69', 86'; Arshavin 62'

Stade Josy Barthel, Luxembourg City
Attendance: 3,670
Referee: Eric Braamhaar (Netherlands)
9 October 2004
17:30

Slovakia	4–1	Latvia
Németh 46'; L. Reiter 50'; Karhan 55', 87'	(Report)	Verpakovskis 3'

Tehelné pole, Bratislava
Attendance: 13,025
Referee: Stefano Farina (Italy)
9 October 2004
19:15

Liechtenstein	2–2	Portugal
Burgmeier 48'; T. Beck 76'	(Report)	Pauleta 23'; Hasler 39' (o.g.)

Rheinpark Stadion, Vaduz
Attendance: 3,548
Referee: Novo Panić (Bosnia and Herzegovina)

13 October 2004
18:00

Latvia	2–2	Estonia
Astafjevs 65'; Laizāns 82'	(Report)	Oper 72'; Teever 79'

Skonto Stadium, Riga
Attendance: 8,500
Referee: Florian Meyer (Germany)
13 October 2004
20:00

Luxembourg	0–4	Liechtenstein
	(Report)	Ma. Stocklasa 41'; Burgmeier 44', 85'; M. Frick 57' (pen.)

Stade Josy Barthel, Luxembourg City
Attendance: 3,478
Referee: Jaroslav Jára (Czech Republic)
13 October 2004
21:15

Portugal	7–1	Russia
Pauleta 26'; Ronaldo 39', 69'; Deco 45'; Simão 82'; Petit 89', 90+2'	(Report)	Arshavin 79'

Estádio José Alvalade, Lisbon
Attendance: 27,258
Referee: Kyros Vassaras (Greece)

17 November 2004
19:00

Russia	4–0	Estonia
Karyaka 23'; Izmailov 25'; Sychev 32'; Loskov 67' (pen.)	(Report)

Kuban Stadium, Krasnodar
Attendance: 29,000
Referee: Massimo Busacca (Switzerland)
17 November 2004
19:00

Liechtenstein	1–3	Latvia
M. Frick 32'	(Report)	Verpakovskis 7'; Zemļinskis 57'; Prohorenkovs 89'

Rheinpark Stadion, Vaduz
Attendance: 1,460
Referee: Zsolt Szabó (Hungary)
17 November 2004
20:00

Luxembourg	0–5	Portugal
	(Report)	Federspiel 11' (o.g.); Ronaldo 28'; Maniche 52'; Pauleta 67', 82'

Stade Josy Barthel, Luxembourg City
Attendance: 8,045
Referee: Vitaliy Godulyan (Ukraine)

26 March 2005
17:00

Liechtenstein	1–2	Russia
T. Beck 40'	(Report)	Kerzhakov 23'; Karyaka 37'

Rheinpark Stadion, Vaduz
Attendance: 2,400
Referee: Espen Berntsen (Norway)
26 March 2005
18:00

Estonia	1–2	Slovakia
Oper 57'	(Report)	Mintál 58'; L. Reiter 65'

Lilleküla Stadium, Tallinn
Attendance: 3,051
Referee: Peter Fröjdfeldt (Sweden)

30 March 2005
18:00

Estonia	1–1	Russia
Terehhov 63'	(Report)	Arshavin 18'

Lilleküla Stadium, Tallinn
Attendance: 8,850
Referee: Gianluca Paparesta (Italy)
30 March 2005
19:00

Slovakia	1–1	Portugal
Karhan 8' (pen.)	(Report)	Postiga 62'

Tehelné pole, Bratislava
Attendance: 21,000
Referee: Alain Sars (France)
30 March 2005
19:00

Latvia	4–0	Luxembourg
Bleidelis 32'; Laizāns 38' (pen.); Verpakovskis 73', 90'	(Report)

Skonto Stadium, Riga
Attendance: 8,203
Referee: Draženko Kovačić (Croatia)

4 June 2005
18:00

Estonia	2–0	Liechtenstein
Stepanov 27'; Oper 57'	(Report)

Lilleküla Stadium, Tallinn
Attendance: 3,000
Referee: Mark Whitby (Wales)
4 June 2005
18:00

Russia	2–0	Latvia
Arshavin 56'; Loskov 78' (pen.)	(Report)

Petrovsky Stadium, Saint Petersburg
Attendance: 21,575
Referee: Éric Poulat (France)
4 June 2005
19:45

Portugal	2–0	Slovakia
Meira 21'; Ronaldo 42'	(Report)

Estádio da Luz, Lisbon
Attendance: 64,000
Referee: Pierluigi Collina (Italy)

8 June 2005
18:30

Latvia	1–0	Liechtenstein
Bleidelis 17'	(Report)

Skonto Stadium, Riga
Attendance: 8,000
Referee: Jonas Eriksson (Sweden)
8 June 2005
20:00

Luxembourg	0–4	Slovakia
	(Report)	Németh 5'; Mintál 15'; Kisel 54'; L. Reiter 60'

Stade Josy Barthel, Luxembourg City
Attendance: 2,108
Referee: Rob Styles (England)
8 June 2005
20:15

Estonia	0–1	Portugal
	(Report)	Ronaldo 32'

Lilleküla Stadium, Tallinn
Attendance: 10,280
Referee: Mike Riley (England)

17 August 2005
18:00

Latvia	1–1	Russia
Astafjevs 6'	(Report)	Arshavin 24'

Skonto Stadium, Riga
Attendance: 10,000
Referee: Graham Poll (England)
17 August 2005
20:15

Liechtenstein	0–0	Slovakia
	(Report)

Rheinpark Stadion, Vaduz
Attendance: 1,150
Referee: Bertrand Layec (France)

3 September 2005
18:00

Estonia	2–1	Latvia
Oper 11'; Smirnov 71'	(Report)	Laizāns 90'

Lilleküla Stadium, Tallinn
Attendance: 8,970
Referee: Alberto Undiano Mallenco (Spain)
3 September 2005
19:00

Russia	2–0	Liechtenstein
Kerzhakov 27', 66'	(Report)

Lokomotiv, Moscow
Attendance: 18,123
Referee: Jouni Hyytiä (Finland)
3 September 2005
21:15

Portugal	6–0	Luxembourg
Andrade 24'; Carvalho 30'; Pauleta 38', 57'; Simão 80', 85'	(Report)

Estádio Algarve, Faro
Attendance: 25,300
Referee: Dick van Egmond (Netherlands)

7 September 2005
19:00

Latvia	1–1	Slovakia
Laizāns 74'	(Report)	Vittek 35'

Skonto Stadium, Riga
Attendance: 8,800
Referee: Konrad Plautz (Austria)
7 September 2005
19:00

Russia	0–0	Portugal
	(Report)

Lokomotiv, Moscow
Attendance: 28,800
Referee: Markus Merk (Germany)
7 September 2005
19:30

Liechtenstein	3–0	Luxembourg
M. Frick 38'; Fischer 77'; T. Beck 90+2'	(Report)

Rheinpark Stadion, Vaduz
Attendance: 2,300
Referee: Damir Skomina (Slovenia)

8 October 2005
17:00

Slovakia	1–0	Estonia
Hlinka 72'	(Report)

Tehelné pole, Bratislava
Attendance: 12,800
Referee: Paul Allaerts (Belgium)
8 October 2005
19:00

Russia	5–1	Luxembourg
Izmailov 6'; Kerzhakov 187'; Pavlyuchenko 69'; Kirichenko 74', 90+3'	(Report)	C. Reiter 51' (pen.)

Lokomotiv, Moscow
Attendance: 20,000
Referee: Alexandru Tudor (Romania)
8 October 2005
21:15

Portugal	2–1	Liechtenstein
Pauleta 48'; Nuno Gomes 85'	(Report)	Fischer 32'

Estádio Municipal de Aveiro, Aveiro
Attendance: 29,000
Referee: Grzegorz Gilewski (Poland)

12 October 2005
19:30

Portugal	3–0	Latvia
Pauleta 20', 22'; Viana 86'	(Report)

Estádio do Dragão, Porto
Attendance: 35,000
Referee: Peter Fröjdfeldt (Sweden)
12 October 2005
20:15

Luxembourg	0–2	Estonia
	(Report)	Oper 7', 78'

Stade Josy Barthel, Luxembourg City
Attendance: 2,010
Referee: Selçuk Dereli (Turkey)
12 October 2005
20:30

Slovakia	0–0	Russia
	(Report)

Tehelné pole, Bratislava
Attendance: 22,317
Referee: Roberto Rosetti (Italy)

== Goalscorers ==
There were 134 goals scored in 42 matches, for an average of 3.19 goals per match.

11 goals

- (Portugal) Pauleta

7 goals

- (Estonia) Andres Oper
- (Portugal) Cristiano Ronaldo

6 goals

- (Slovakia) Róbert Vittek

5 goals

- (Latvia) Māris Verpakovskis
- (Russia) Andrei Arshavin

4 goals

- (Latvia) Juris Laizāns
- (Russia) Aleksandr Kerzhakov
- (Russia) Dmitri Sychev
- (Slovakia) Miroslav Karhan

3 goals

- (Liechtenstein) Thomas Beck
- (Liechtenstein) Franz Burgmeier
- (Liechtenstein) Mario Frick
- (Portugal) Hélder Postiga
- (Portugal) Simão
- (Slovakia) Marek Mintál
- (Slovakia) Szilárd Németh
- (Slovakia) Ľubomír Reiter

2 goals

- (Estonia) Ingemar Teever
- (Estonia) Kristen Viikmäe
- (Latvia) Vitālijs Astafjevs
- (Latvia) Imants Bleidelis
- (Latvia) Andrejs Prohorenkovs
- (Latvia) Mihails Zemļinskis
- (Liechtenstein) Benjamin Fischer
- (Portugal) Petit
- (Russia) Marat Izmailov
- (Russia) Andrei Karyaka
- (Russia) Dmitri Kirichenko
- (Russia) Dmitri Loskov

1 goal

- (Estonia) Joel Lindpere
- (Estonia) Maksim Smirnov
- (Estonia) Andrei Stepanov
- (Estonia) Sergei Terehhov
- (Liechtenstein) Fabio D'Elia
- (Liechtenstein) Martin Stocklasa
- (Luxembourg) Gordon Braun
- (Luxembourg) Manuel Cardoni
- (Luxembourg) Alphonse Leweck
- (Luxembourg) Claude Reiter
- (Luxembourg) Jeff Strasser
- (Portugal) Jorge Andrade
- (Portugal) Ricardo Carvalho
- (Portugal) Deco
- (Portugal) Nuno Gomes
- (Portugal) Maniche
- (Portugal) Fernando Meira
- (Portugal) Hugo Viana
- (Russia) Dmitri Bulykin
- (Russia) Roman Pavlyuchenko
- (Slovakia) Igor Demo
- (Slovakia) Vratislav Greško
- (Slovakia) Peter Hlinka
- (Slovakia) Karol Kisel
- (Slovakia) Radoslav Zabavník

1 own goal

- (Liechtenstein) Daniel Hasler (against Portugal)
- (Luxembourg) Ben Federspiel (against Portugal)
- (Luxembourg) Eric Hoffmann (against Latvia)
- (Luxembourg) Manuel Schauls (against Estonia)
