= 1950 FIFA World Cup qualification =

Football tournament

1950 FIFA World Cup Qualification
Tournament details
- Dates: 2 June 1949 – 15 April 1950
- Teams: 34 (from 3 confederations)

Tournament statistics
- Matches played: 26
- Goals scored: 121 (4.65 per match)
- Top scorer(s): (England) Jack Rowley (Mexico) Horacio Casarín (Mexico) Luis de la Fuente (Socialist Federal Republic of Yugoslavia) Željko Čajkovski (4 goals each)

A total of 34 teams entered the qualification rounds of the 1950 FIFA World Cup, competing for a total of 16 spots in the final tournament. Brazil, as the hosts, and Italy, as the defending champions, qualified automatically, leaving 14 spots open for competition.

The remaining 32 teams were divided into 10 groups, based on geographical considerations, as follows:

- Groups 1 to 6 – Europe and the Near East: 7 places, contested by 18 teams (including Israel and Syria).
- Groups 7 to 9 – The Americas: 6 places, contested by 10 teams.
- Group 10 – Asia: 1 place, contested by 4 teams.

Of the 14 qualified teams, 5 did not play any qualifying games because their opponents withdrew.

However, after the withdrawals of India, Scotland, and Turkey after qualifying, only 13 teams actually competed in the final tournament.

A total of 19 teams played at least one qualifying match. A total of 26 qualifying matches were played, and 121 goals were scored (an average of 4.65 per match).

Listed below are the dates and results of the qualification rounds.

== Groups ==
The 10 groups had different rules, as follows:

- Group 1 had 4 teams. The teams played against each other once, either home or away. The group winner and runner-up would qualify.
- Groups 2, 3 and 4 had 3 teams each. The strongest team of each group was seeded. There would be two rounds of play:
  - First Round: The seeded team received a bye and advanced to the final round directly. The 2 unseeded teams played against each other on a home-and-away basis. The winner would advance to the final round.
  - Final Round: The seeded team played against the winner of the First Round on a home-and-away basis. The winner would qualify.
- Group 5 had 3 teams. The teams played against each other on a home-and-away basis. The group winner would qualify.
- Group 6 had 2 teams. The teams played against each other on a home-and-away basis. The group winner would qualify.
- Group 7 had 3 teams. The group winner and runner-up would qualify.
- Group 8 had 4 teams. The group winner and runner-up would qualify.
- Group 9 had 3 teams. The teams played against each other twice. The group winner and runner-up would qualify.
- Group 10 had 4 teams. The group winner would qualify.

=== Group 1 ===
Pos	Team	Pld	W	D	L	GF	GA	GD	Pts	Qualification
1	England (C)	3	3	0	0	14	3	+11	6	Qualification for 1950 FIFA World Cup
2	Scotland	3	2	0	1	10	3	+7	4	Qualification for 1950 FIFA World Cup
3	Wales	3	0	1	2	1	6	−5	1	
4	Ireland (IFA)	3	0	1	2	4	17	−13	1	

Source: RSSSF
Rules for classification: 1) points. The points system worked as follows: 2 points for a win and 1 point for a draw.
(C) Champions
1 October 1949

Ireland (IFA)	2–8	Scotland
Smyth 50', 59'	Report	Morris 2', 70', 88'; Waddell 5', 31' (pen.); Steel 23'; Reilly 24'; Mason 80'

Windsor Park, Belfast, Northern Ireland
Attendance: 50,000
Referee: Reginald Mortimer (England)

15 October 1949

Wales	1–4	England
Griffiths 80'	Report	Mortensen 22'; Milburn 29', 34', 66'

Ninian Park, Cardiff, Wales
Attendance: 60,000
Referee: Jack Mowat (Scotland)

9 November 1949

Scotland	2–0	Wales
McPhail 25'; Linwood 78'	Report

Hampden Park, Glasgow, Scotland
Attendance: 73,782
Referee: S.K. Law (England)

16 November 1949

England	9–2	Ireland (IFA)
Rowley 6', 47', 56', 58'; Froggatt 25'; Mortensen 35', 50'; Pearson 33', 68'	Report	Smyth 55'; Brennan 75'

Maine Road, Manchester, England
Attendance: 57,000
Referee: Mervyn Griffiths (Wales)

8 March 1950

Wales	0–0	Ireland (IFA)
	Report

Racecourse Ground, Wrexham, Wales
Attendance: 60,000
Referee: Reginald Leafe (England)

15 April 1950

Scotland	0–1	England
	Report	Bentley 64'

Hampden Park, Glasgow, Scotland
Attendance: 138,000
Referee: Reginald Leafe (England)

England qualified. Scotland also qualified, but declined to participate.

=== Group 2 ===
==== First round ====
Pos	Team	Pld	W	D	L	GF	GA	GD	Pts
1	Turkey	1	1	0	0	7	0	+7	2
2	Syria	1	0	0	1	0	7	−7	0

Source: 11v11.com
20 November 1949

Turkey	7–0	Syria
Cansever 12', 16', 87'; Eken 44'; Küçükandonyadis 66'; Keskin 67'; Kılıç 72'	Report

19 Mayıs Stadium, Ankara, Turkey
Attendance: 35,000
Referee: Antonio Gamba (Italy)

Syria withdrew after the first match, and the remaining match was not played.

Turkey advanced to the Final Round.

==== Final round ====
Pos	Team	Pld	Pts	Qualification
—	Turkey	0	0	Qualified, later withdrew
—	Austria	0	0	Withdrew

Source: ESPN

Austria withdrew, so Turkey qualified automatically. But Turkey later also withdrew, and FIFA offered the place to Portugal, the runner-up of Group 6, but they declined. FIFA decided not to allow anyone else to qualify, leaving the World Cup two teams short.

=== Group 3 ===
==== First round ====
Pos	Team	Pld	W	D	L	GF	GA	GD	Pts
1	Yugoslavia	2	2	0	0	11	2	+9	4
2	Israel	2	0	0	2	2	11	−9	0

21 August 1949

Yugoslavia	6–0	Israel
Pajević 12', 19', 26'; Senčar 44'; Že. Čajkovski 63'; Bobek 83' (pen.)	Report

JNA Stadion, Belgrade, Yugoslavia
Attendance: 35,000
Referee: Giovanni Galeati (Italy)

18 September 1949

Israel	2–5	Yugoslavia
Glazer 65', 76'	Report	Valok 19', 64'; Bobek 20'; Zl. Čajkovski 41'; Že. Čajkovski 82'

Maccabiah Stadium, Tel Aviv, Israel
Attendance: 20,000
Referee: Jozsef Künsztler (Hungary)

Yugoslavia advanced to the Final Round.

==== Final round ====
Pos	Team	Pld	W	D	L	GF	GA	GD	Pts
1	France	2	0	2	0	2	2	0	2
1	Yugoslavia	2	0	2	0	2	2	0	2

9 October 1949

Yugoslavia	1–1	France
Že. Čajkovski 36'	Report	Baillot 55'

JNA Stadion, Belgrade, Yugoslavia
Attendance: 50,000
Referee: Karel van der Meer (Netherlands)

30 October 1949

France	1–1	Yugoslavia
Baillot 8'	Report	Bobek 44'

Stade Olympique de Colombes, Paris, France
Attendance: 53,569
Referee: Peter Scherz (Swiss)

France 2–2 Yugoslavia on aggregate, and a play-off on neutral ground was played to decide who would qualify.

11 December 1949

Yugoslavia	3–2 (a.e.t.)	France
Mihajlović 12', 84' (pen.); Že. Čajkovski 114'	Report	Walter 13'; Luciano 83'

Stadio Giovanni Berta, Florence, Italy
Attendance: 25,000
Referee: Giovanni Galeati (Italy)

Yugoslavia qualified while France were also offered a place by FIFA. France initially accepted, but later declined.

=== Group 4 ===
==== First round ====
Pos	Team	Pld	W	D	L	GF	GA	GD	Pts
1	Switzerland	2	2	0	0	8	4	+4	4
2	Luxembourg	2	0	0	2	4	8	−4	0

26 June 1949

Switzerland	5–2	Luxembourg
Maillard 20'; Fatton 30', 41'; Ballaman 48'; Antenen 59'	Report	Wagner 3'; Reuter 88'

Hardturm, Zürich, Switzerland
Attendance: 15,000
Referee: Charles Delasalle (France)

18 September 1949

Luxembourg	2–3	Switzerland
Müller 3'; Kremer 38'	Report	Maillard 1'; Friedländer 59'; Fatton 75'

Stade Municipal, Luxembourg, Luxembourg
Attendance: 3,000
Referee: Pierre Theunen (Belgium)

Switzerland advanced to the Final Round.

==== Final round ====
Pos	Team	Pld	Pts	Qualification
—	Switzerland	0	0	Qualified
—	Belgium	0	0	Withdrew

Belgium withdrew, so Switzerland qualified automatically.

=== Group 5 ===
Pos	Team	Pld	W	D	L	GF	GA	GD	Pts
1	Sweden	2	2	0	0	6	2	+4	4
2	Ireland (FAI)	4	1	1	2	6	7	−1	3
3	Finland	2	0	1	1	1	4	−3	1

2 June 1949

Sweden	3–1	Ireland (FAI)
Andersson 17' (pen.); Jeppson 37'; Liedholm 69'	Report	Walsh 9'

Råsunda Stadion, Stockholm, Sweden
Attendance: 36,200
Referee: Louis Baert (Belgium)

8 September 1949

Ireland (FAI)	3–0	Finland
Gavin 35'; Martin 44' (pen.), 68'	Report

Dalymount Park, Dublin, Ireland
Attendance: 36,000
Referee: W.H.E. Evan (England)

9 October 1949

Finland	1–1	Ireland (FAI)
Vaihela 89'	Report	Farrell 65'

Olympiastadion, Helsinki, Finland
Attendance: 13,437
Referee: Johan Bronkhorst (Netherlands)

13 November 1949

Ireland (FAI) (Republic of Ireland)	1–3	Sweden
Martin 61' (pen.)	Report	Palmér 4', 40', 68'

Dalymount Park, Dublin, Ireland
Attendance: 43,000
Referee: William Ling (England)

Sweden qualified. Finland withdrew before the group was completed. Ireland (FAI) were subsequently invited to enter competition but declined the opportunity because of travelling costs.

Sweden beat Finland 8–1 on 2 October 1949 in Malmö. However, FIFA's website does not include this match in the list of matches or in the group standings. RSSSF's website lists the match with the note "Sweden played B-team", and does not provide group standings.

=== Group 6 ===
Pos	Team	Pld	W	D	L	GF	GA	GD	Pts	Qualification
1	Spain	2	1	1	0	7	3	+4	3	Qualification for 1950 FIFA World Cup
2	Portugal	2	0	1	1	3	7	−4	1	

2 April 1950

Spain	5–1	Portugal
Zarra 11', 58'; Basora 13'; Panizo 15'; Molowny 65'	Report	Cabrita 36'

Estadio Nuevo Chamartín, Madrid, Spain
Attendance: 80,000
Referee: Reg Leafe (England)

9 April 1950

Portugal	2–2	Spain
Travassos 51'; Correia 53'	Report	Zarra 24'; Gaínza 82'

Jamor, Lisbon, Portugal
Attendance: 30,000
Referee: Jack Mowat (Scotland)

Spain qualified. Portugal were also invited to take part but they declined.

=== Group 7 ===
Pos	Team	Pld	Pts	Qualification
1	Bolivia	0	0	Qualified
1	Chile	0	0	Qualified
3	Argentina	0	0	Withdrew

Source: RSSSF

Argentina withdrew, so Bolivia and Chile qualified automatically.

=== Group 8 ===
Pos	Team	Pld	Pts	Qualification
1	Uruguay	0	0	Qualified
1	Paraguay	0	0	Qualified
3	Ecuador	0	0	Withdrew
3	Peru	0	0	Withdrew

Source: RSSSF

Ecuador and Peru withdrew, so Uruguay and Paraguay qualified automatically.

=== Group 9 ===
Pos	Team	Pld	W	D	L	GF	GA	GD	Pts
1	Mexico	4	4	0	0	17	2	+15	8
2	United States	4	1	1	2	8	15	−7	3
3	Cuba	4	0	1	3	3	11	−8	1

Source: RSSSF
4 September 1949

United States	0–6	Mexico
	Report	Flores 20'; Luna 30' de la Fuente 37', 55', 58'; Septién 85'

Estadio de los Deportes, Mexico City, Mexico
Attendance: 60,000
Referee: José Tapia (Cuba)

11 September 1949

Mexico	2–0	Cuba
Luna 26'; Casarín 57'	Report

Estadio de los Deportes, Mexico City, Mexico
Attendance: 60,000
Referee: Prudencio García (United States)

14 September 1949

Cuba	1–1	United States
Gómez 28'	Report	Wallace 23'

Estadio de los Deportes, Mexico City, Mexico
Attendance: 8,000

18 September 1949

Mexico	6–2	United States
Ortiz 14'; Casarín 23', 41', 76' de la Fuente 47'; Ochoa 89'	Report	Souza 52'; Wattman 90'

Estadio de los Deportes, Mexico City, Mexico
Attendance: 30,000
Referee: José Tapia (Cuba)

21 September 1949

United States	5–2	Cuba
Bahr 16'; Souza 23'; Matevich 30', 35'; Wallace 48'	Report	Barquín 42'; Veiga 50'

Estadio de los Deportes, Mexico City, Mexico
Attendance: 5,000
Referee: José Tapia (Cuba)

25 September 1949

Mexico	3–0	Cuba
Naranjo 44', 88'; Flores 58'	Report

Estadio de los Deportes, Mexico City, Mexico
Attendance: 35,000
Referee: Prudencio García (United States)

Mexico and the United States qualified.

=== Group 10 ===
Pos	Team	Pld	Pts	Qualification
1	India	0	0	Qualified
3	Burma	0	0	Withdrew
3	Indonesia	0	0	Withdrew
3	Philippines	0	0	Withdrew

Source: rsssf.com

Burma, Indonesia and the Philippines all withdrew before the draw, so India qualified automatically. But India later also withdrew "because of the expense of travelling such a long way to play," and the AIFF wanted to concentrate on the 1952 Olympics. Although according to some reports, it was caused by a FIFA ruling that players were not allowed to play barefoot. FIFA decided not to invite anyone else, leaving the World Cup three teams short.

== Qualified teams ==
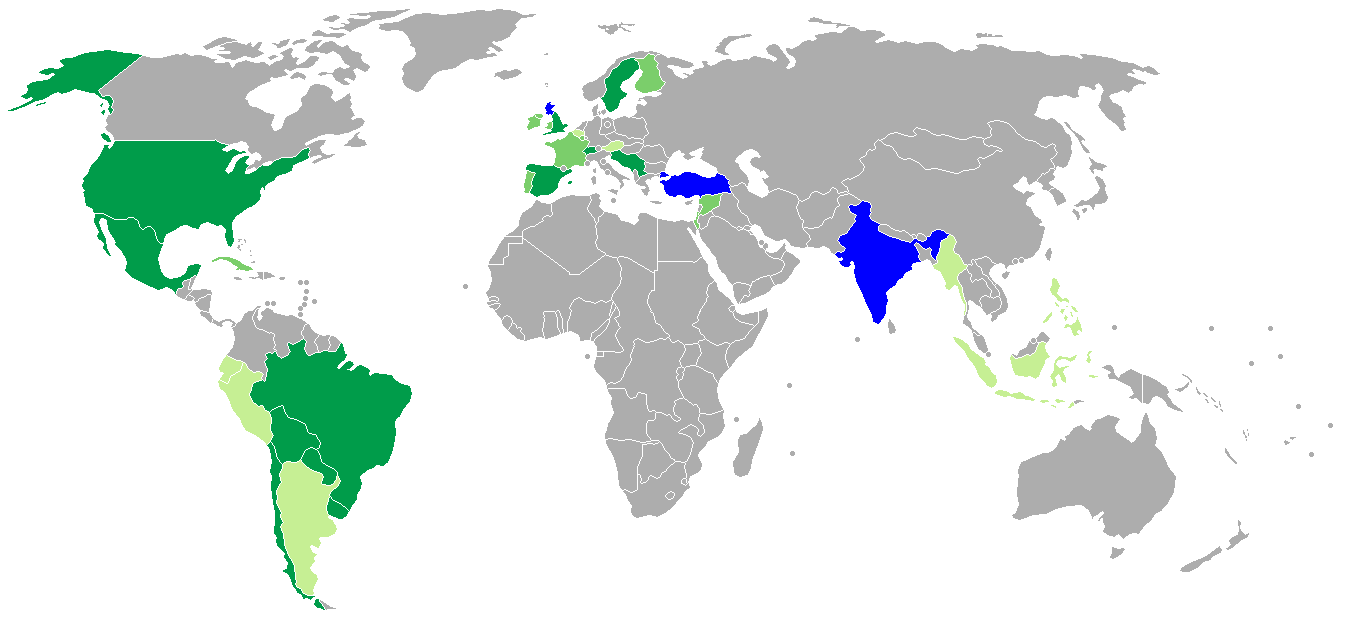
FIFA World Cup qualification 1950

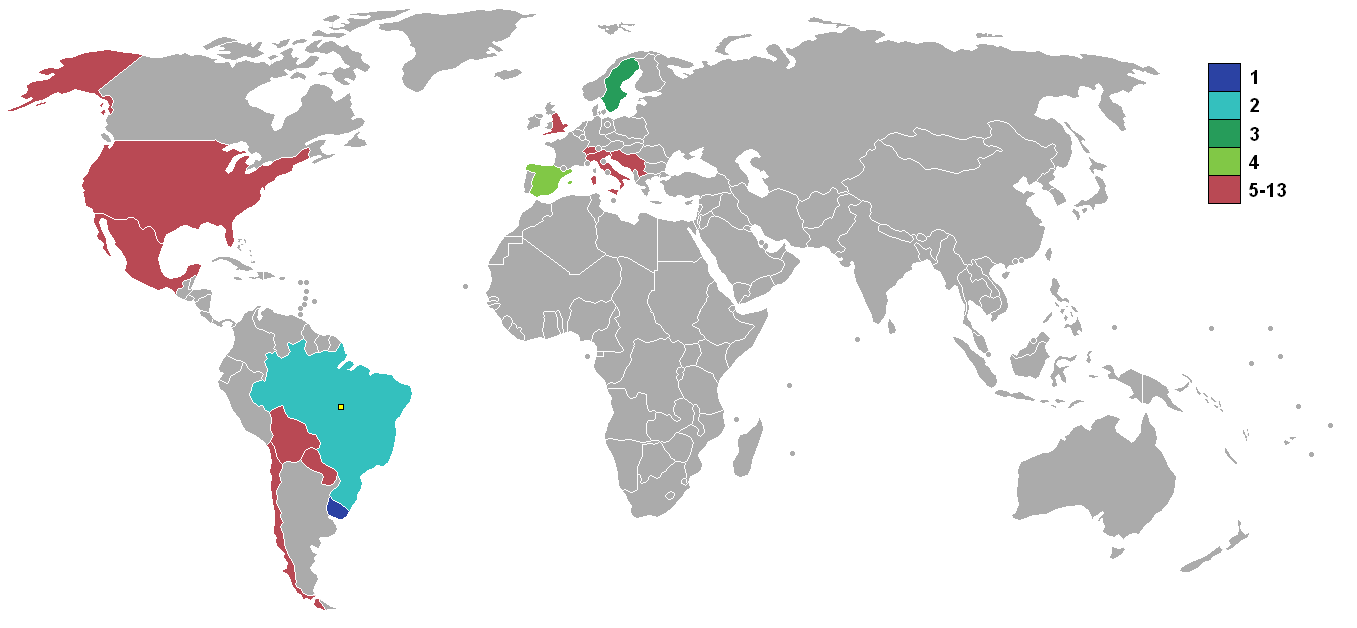
Participating countries after 3 of the 16 qualifying countries withdrew.

Team	Finals appearance	Streak	Last appearance
Bolivia	2nd	1	1930
Brazil (H)	4th	4	1938
Chile	2nd	1	1930
England	1st	1	—
India	1st	1	—
Italy (C)	3rd	3	1938
Mexico	2nd	1	1930
Paraguay	2nd	1	1930
Spain	2nd	1	1934
France	4th	4	1938
Sweden	3rd	3	1938
Switzerland	3rd	3	1938
Turkey	1st	1	—
United States	3rd	1	1934
Uruguay	2nd	1	1930
Yugoslavia	2nd	1	1930

- India, France and Turkey withdrew after qualifying.
- (H) – qualified automatically as hosts
- (C) – qualified automatically as defending champions

== Goalscorers ==
4 goals

- (England) Jack Rowley
- (Mexico) Horacio Casarín
- (Mexico) Luis de la Fuente
- (Socialist Federal Republic of Yugoslavia) Željko Čajkovski

3 goals

- (England) Jackie Milburn
- (England) Stan Mortensen
- (Ireland) Sammy Smyth
- (Republic of Ireland) Con Martin
- (Scotland) Henry Morris
- (Spain) Telmo Zarra
- (Sweden) Karl-Erik Palmér
- (Switzerland) Jacques Fatton
- (Turkey) Fahrettin Cansever
- (Socialist Federal Republic of Yugoslavia) Stjepan Bobek
- (Socialist Federal Republic of Yugoslavia) Milutin Pajević

2 goals

- (England) Stan Pearson
- (France) Henri Baillot
- (Israel) Yehoshua Glazer
- (Mexico) Antonio Flores
- (Mexico) Luis Luna
- (Mexico) José Naranjo
- (Scotland) William Waddell
- (Switzerland) René Maillard
- (United States) Pete Matevich
- (United States) John Souza
- (United States) Frank Wallace
- (Socialist Federal Republic of Yugoslavia) Prvoslav Mihajlović
- (Socialist Federal Republic of Yugoslavia) Marko Valok

1 goal

- (Cuba) Jacinto Barquín
- (Cuba) José Gómez
- (Cuba) Santiago Veiga
- (England) Roy Bentley
- (England) Jack Froggatt
- (Finland) Jorma Vaihela
- (France) Jean Luciano
- (France) Marius Walter
- (Ireland) Bobby Brennan
- (Republic of Ireland) Peter Farrell
- (Republic of Ireland) Johnny Gavin
- (Republic of Ireland) Davy Walsh
- (Luxembourg) Jim Kremer
- (Luxembourg) Armand Müller
- (Luxembourg) Michel Reuter
- (Luxembourg) Camille Wagner
- (Mexico) Mario Ochoa
- (Mexico) Héctor Ortiz
- (Mexico) Carlos Septién
- (Portugal) Fernando Cabrita
- (Portugal) Jesus Correia
- (Portugal) José Travassos
- (Scotland) Alec Linwood
- (Scotland) Jimmy Mason
- (Scotland) John McPhail
- (Scotland) Lawrie Reilly
- (Scotland) Billy Steel
- (Spain) Estanislau Basora
- (Spain) Agustín Gaínza
- (Spain) Luis Molowny
- (Spain) José Luis Panizo
- (Sweden) Sune Andersson
- (Sweden) Hasse Jeppson
- (Sweden) Nils Liedholm
- (Switzerland) Kiki Antenen
- (Switzerland) Robert Ballaman
- (Switzerland) Hans-Peter Friedländer
- (United States) Walter Bahr
- (United States) Ben Wattman
- (Turkey) Bülent Eken
- (Turkey) Erol Keskin
- (Turkey) Gündüz Kılıç
- (Turkey) Lefter Küçükandonyadis
- (Wales) Mal Griffiths
- (Socialist Federal Republic of Yugoslavia) Zlatko Čajkovski
- (Socialist Federal Republic of Yugoslavia) Božidar Senčar

== Notes ==
- At the start of 1950 there were, in effect, two Ireland teams, chosen by two rival associations. Both associations, the Northern Ireland-based IFA and the Republic of Ireland-based FAI claimed jurisdiction over the whole of Ireland and selected players from the whole island. As a result, several notable Irish players from this era played for both teams. Four players – Tom Aherne, Reg Ryan, Davy Walsh and Con Martin – actually played for both the FAI XI and the IFA XI in these qualifying rounds. FIFA intervened, after complaints from the FAI, and subsequently restricted players' eligibility based on the political border. In 1953 FIFA ruled neither team could be referred to as Ireland, decreeing that the FAI team be officially designated as the Republic of Ireland, while the IFA team was to become Northern Ireland.
- For the third qualifying tournament in a row, the South American teams qualified automatically after withdrawals. In Group 7, Bolivia and Chile did play two matches between them, but they were not classified as official World Cup qualifiers by FIFA.
- Burma, the Philippines and Indonesia all withdrew, so India qualified automatically. However, India withdrew later because of "disagreements over team selection and insufficient practice time.". India had never been able to qualify for the World Cup before and have never been able to do since then, which means they are the only team to have qualified for the World Cup and that never played a World Cup match.
- Germany and Japan were both banned because of their actions during World War II. Italy, despite originally being a member of the Axis powers, was allowed to participate because its government was overthrown in 1943 and the new government sided with the Allies.
