= Sportsperson of the Year (Luxembourg) =

Luxembourg sports award

The Sportsperson of the Year awards are a group of awards awarded to the most popular Luxembourgish sportsperson of the preceding year, as voted by the national sportspress. There are two main categories: one for men (French: Trophée du Meilleur Sportif), and one for women (Trophée de la Meilleure Sportive). Other awards are given for the best team (Challenge de la Meilleure Equipe), best young sportsperson (Prix du Jeune Espoir), most honorable sportsperson (Prix d'Honneur), and for fair play (Prix du Fair play). In 2022, the voting for the men's award reached a tie for the first time, the award going to both Bob Jungels and Dylan Pereira. On the women's side, Sarah de Nutte and Ni Xia Lian won the award together after having been nominated as a pair.

== List of winners ==
=== 1954–1965 ===
From 1954 until 1965, there was a single title of "Sportsperson of the Year", awarded to either a male or female sportsperson.

Year	Winner	Sport
1954	Charly Gaul	Cycling
1955	Charly Gaul	Cycling
1956	Charly Gaul	Cycling
1957	Josy Stoffel	Gymnastics
1958	Charly Gaul	Cycling
1959	Jean Link	Fencing
1960	Josy Stoffel	Gymnastics
1961	Sylvie Hülsemann	Water skiing
1962	Norbert Haupert	Athletics
1963	Norbert Haupert	Athletics
1964	Charles Sowa	Walking
1965	René Kilburg	Athletics

=== 1966 onwards ===
It was decided to divide the contest into two from 1966, with separate categories for men and for women, as it has remained since.

Year	Sportsman of the Year		Sportswoman of the Year	
Year	Winner	Sport	Winner	Sport
1966	René Kilburg	Athletics	Sylvie Hülsemann	Water skiing
1967	Charles Sowa	Walking	Colette Flesch	Fencing
1968	Louis Pilot	Football	Sylvie Hülsemann	Water skiing
1969	Louis Pilot	Football	Annette Berger	Athletics
1970	Nicolas Koob	Motorsport	Jeanny Dom	Table tennis
1971	Charles Sowa	Walking	Jeanny Dom	Table tennis
1972	Charles Sowa	Walking	Nelly Wies	Archery
1973	Robert Schiel	Fencing	Jeanny Dom	Table tennis
1974	Marcel Balthasar	Archery	Berty Krier	Table tennis
1975	Roland Bombardella	Athletics	Jeanny Dom	Table tennis
1976	Roland Bombardella	Athletics	Jeanny Dom	Table tennis
1977	Roland Bombardella	Athletics	Jeanny Dom	Table tennis
1978	Roland Bombardella	Athletics	Jeanny Dom	Table tennis
1979	Lucien Didier	Cycling	Carine Risch	Table tennis
1980	Justin Gloden	Athletics	Carine Risch	Table tennis
1981	Fonsy Grethen	Billiards	Carine Risch	Table tennis
1982	Roland Jacoby	Shooting	Carine Risch	Table tennis
1983	Roland Jacoby	Shooting	Jeannette Goergen	Archery
1984	Raymond Conzemius	Athletics	Jeannette Goergen	Archery
1985	Claude Michely	Cycling	Danièle Kaber	Athletics
1986	Fonsy Grethen	Billiards	Danièle Kaber	Athletics
1987	Robby Langers	Football	Nancy Arendt	Swimming
1988	Marc Girardelli	Skiing	Danièle Kaber	Athletics
1989	Marc Girardelli	Skiing	Nancy Arendt	Swimming
1990	Guy Hellers	Football	Marion Hammang	Weightlifting
1991	Marc Girardelli	Skiing	Malou Thill	Weightlifting
1992	Eugène Berger	Mountaineering	Marion Hammang	Weightlifting
1993	Marc Girardelli	Skiing	Anne Kremer	Tennis
1994	Marc Girardelli	Skiing	Raymonde Moes	Karate
1995	Guy Hellers	Football	Nancy Kemp-Arendt	Triathlon
1996	Marc Girardelli	Skiing	Nancy Kemp-Arendt	Triathlon
1997	Christian Poos	Cycling	Nancy Kemp-Arendt	Triathlon
1998	Dan Dethier	Triathlon	Anne Kremer	Tennis
1999	Jeff Strasser	Football	Anne Kremer	Tennis
2000	Kim Kirchen	Cycling	Nancy Kemp-Arendt	Triathlon
2001	Jeff Strasser	Football	Ni Xia Lian	Table tennis
2002	David Fiegen	Athletics	Tessy Scholtes	Karate
2003	Kim Kirchen	Cycling	Claudine Schaul	Tennis
2004	Kim Kirchen	Cycling	Elizabeth May	Triathlon
2005	Kim Kirchen	Cycling	Elizabeth May	Triathlon
2006	Fränk Schleck	Cycling	Elizabeth May	Triathlon
2007	Kim Kirchen	Cycling	Elizabeth May	Triathlon
2008	Kim Kirchen	Cycling	Marie Muller	Judo
2009	Andy Schleck	Cycling	Elizabeth May	Triathlon
2010	Andy Schleck	Cycling	Marie Muller	Judo
2011	Andy Schleck	Cycling	Mandy Minella	Tennis
2012	Laurent Carnol	Swimming	Marie Muller	Judo
2013	Dirk Bockel	Triathlon	Christine Majerus	Cycling
2014	Gilles Müller	Tennis	Jenny Warling	Karate
2015	Gilles Muller	Tennis	Christine Majerus	Cycling
2016	Gilles Muller	Tennis	Christine Majerus	Cycling
2017	Gilles Muller	Tennis	Christine Majerus	Cycling
2018	Bob Jungels	Cycling	Christine Majerus	Cycling
2019	Bob Bertemes	Athletics	Christine Majerus	Cycling
2021	Charles Grethen	Athletics	Christine Majerus	Cycling
2022	Bob Jungels; Dylan Pereira	Cycling; Motorsport	Ni Xia Lian; Sarah De Nutte	Table tennis Table tennis
2023	Leandro Barreiro	Football	Patrizia van der Weken	Athletics
2024	Tom Habscheid	Para-athletics	Patrizia van der Weken	Athletics
2025	Ruben Querinjean	Athletics	Patrizia van der Weken	Athletics

Note: In 2022, the men's award voting resulted in a tie between Bob Jungels and Dylan Pereira, both having 370 points. On the women's side, Ni Xia Lian and Sarah De Nutte won the title together having been nominated as a pair.

=== Luxembourgish Team of the Year ===
This 3rd annual award was first given out in 1962.

Year	Winner
1962	BBC Etzella Ettelbruck
1963	Luxembourg national football team
1964	HB Dudelange
1965	DT Red Boys Differdange
1966	Militärliichtathletikequipe
1967	HB Dudelange
1968	Jeunesse Esch
1969	Jeunesse Esch
1970	HB Dudelange
1971	Women's Table Tennis national team
1972	Table Tennis National Team
1973	Deegen-Nationalequipe
1974	Table Tennis Europaliga-Luxembourg Women's
1975	Table Tennis Europaliga-Luxembourg Women's
1976	T71 Dudelange
1977	Table Tennis Europaliga-Team
1978	Table Tennis Europaliga-Team
1979	FA Red Boys Differdange
1980	Luxembourg national football team
1981	Handball national team
1982	Table Tennis Europaliga-Team
1983	Table Tennis Europaliga-Team
1984	Luxembourg national basketball team
1985	Sporting Luxembourg Women
1986	Jeunesse Esch
1987	Luxembourg national football team
1988	Luxembourg national football team
1989	Luxembourg national football team
1990	Luxembourg national football team
1991	Luxembourg national football team
1992	Luxembourg Davis Cup team
1993	Men's Table Tennis national team
1994	Table Tennis Europaliga-Team
1995	Luxembourg national football team
1996	Table Tennis Europaliga-Luxembourg Women's
1997	Women's Table Tennis national team
1998	Women's Table Tennis national team
1999	Women's Table Tennis national team
2000	Table Tennis Doubles Ni-Regenwetter
2001	Women's Table Tennis national team
2002	Women's Table Tennis national team
2003	Luxembourg Davis Cup team
2004	Luxembourg Davis Cup team
2005	Guy Rosen together with Viktoriya Fadina (Dance)
2006	Luxembourg Davis Cup team
2007	Luxembourg national football team
2008	Luxembourg national football team
2009	Women's Table Tennis national team
2010	Handball Esch
2011	Luxembourg national football team
2012	F91 Dudelange
2013	Handball Esch
2014	Luxembourg Women's Table Tennis
2015	Luxembourg Women's Table Tennis
2016	Luxembourg Women's Table Tennis
2017	Luxembourg national football team
2018	F91 Dudelange
2019	F91 Dudelange
2021	Luxembourg national football team
2022	Luxembourg national football team
2023	Luxembourg national football team
2024	Luxembourg women's national basketball team
2025	Luxembourg women's national football team

== Individual statistics ==
=== Winners of more than three titles ===
Name	Sport	Titles
Jeanny Dom	Table tennis	7
Christine Majerus	Cycling	7
Marc Girardelli	Skiing	6
Nancy Kemp-Arendt	Swimming, triathlon	6
Kim Kirchen	Cycling	6
Roland Bombardella	Athletics	4
Charly Gaul	Cycling	4
Carine Risch	Table tennis	4
Charles Sowa	Walking	4
Elizabeth May	Triathlon	4
Gilles Muller	Tennis	4
Sylvie Hülsemann	Water skiing	3
Danièle Kaber	Athletics	3
Anne Kremer	Tennis	3
Andy Schleck	Cycling	3
Marie Muller	Judo	3

=== Titles by sport ===
Not including team of the year award.

Sport	Sportspeople	Titles
Cycling	9	26
Athletics	11	19
Table tennis	5	15
Triathlon	4	11
Tennis	4	9
Football	5	8
Skiing	1	6
Archery	3	4
Walking	1	4
Fencing	3	3
Karate	3	3
Weightlifting	2	3
Swimming	2	3
Water skiing	1	3
Judo	1	3
Motorsport	2	2
Gymnastics	1	2
Billiards	1	2
Shooting	1	2
Mountaineering	1	1
Para-athletics	1	1

Note: Nancy Kemp-Arendt's first two titles are categorised under swimming, and most recent four under triathlon.
