= René Schneider (disambiguation) =

René Schneider (1913–1970) was the commander-in-chief of the Chilean Army from 1969 until his assassination in 1970.

René Schneider may also refer to:

- René Schneider (German footballer) (born 1973), German footballer
- René Schneider (Luxembourgian footballer) (born 1938), Luxembourgish footballer
- René Schneider (Swiss footballer) (1936–2011), Swiss footballer
- René Schneider (politician) (born 1976), German politician
