= Caldarella =

Surname list

Caldarella is an Italian-language surname. Notable people with the surname include:

- Benedicto Caldarella (born 1940), Argentine motor cycle racer
- Paolo Caldarella (1964–1993), Italian water polo player

== See also ==
- Caldarelli
