= Mertl =

Mertl is a Czech surname. Notable people with this surname include:

- Gregory Mertl (born 1969), composer
- Jan Mertl (born 1982), Czech tennis player
- Jean-Pierre Mertl (1930–2012), Luxembourgish football player
- Tomáš Mertl (born 1986), Czech ice hockey player

== See also ==
- Mertel
