= Barboni =

Barboni is a surname. Notable people with the surname include:

- Enzo Barboni (1922–2002), Italian film director, cinematographer, and screenwriter
- Jean-Pierre Barboni (born 1958), retired Luxembourgian football midfielder
- Leonida Barboni (1909–1970), Italian film cinematographer
- Vincenzo Barboni (1802–1859), Italian painter
