= Mihoubi =

Mihoubi is a surname. Notable people with the surname include:

- Ahmed Mihoubi (1924–2004), Algerian-born French footballer
- Azzedine Mihoubi (born 1959), Algerian journalist, poet, novelist, and politician
- Hemza Mihoubi (born 1986), Algerian-French footballer
- Maroine Mihoubi (born 1999), French footballer
