= Jacques Speck =

Luxembourgish footballer

Personal information
- Date of birth: 5 November 1931
- Date of death: 3 October 1971 (aged 39)
- Position: Defender

International career
Years	Team	Apps	(Gls)
1953	Luxembourg	2	(0)

Jacques Speck (5 November 1931 – 3 October 1971) was a Luxembourgish footballer. He played in two matches for the Luxembourg national football team in 1953. He was also part of Luxembourg's team for the 1952 Summer Olympics, and for their qualification matches for the 1954 FIFA World Cup.
