= Jules Meurisse =

Luxembourgish footballer

Personal information
- Date of birth: 3 May 1931
- Place of birth: Esch-sur-Alzette, Luxembourg
- Date of death: 26 May 2018 (aged 87)

International career
Years	Team	Apps	(Gls)
1953–1960	Luxembourg	10	(0)

Jules Meurisse (3 May 1931 – 26 May 2018) was a Luxembourgish footballer. He played in ten matches for the Luxembourg national football team from 1953 to 1960. He was also part of Luxembourg's team for their qualification matches for the 1954 FIFA World Cup.
