= Roger Lorang =

Luxembourgish footballer (1930–2023)

Personal information
- Date of birth: 22 November 1930
- Date of death: 10 December 2023 (aged 93)
- Position: Defender

Senior career*
Years	Team	Apps	(Gls)
- Spora Luxembourg

International career
1953	Luxembourg	1	(0)

Managerial career
- Spora Luxembourg
- * Club domestic league appearances and goals

Roger Lorang (22 November 1930 – 10 December 2023) was a Luxembourgish football player and manager who played as a defender. He made one appearance for the Luxembourg national team in 1953. He was also part of Luxembourg's team for their qualification matches for the 1954 FIFA World Cup. Lorang died on 10 December 2023, at the age of 93.
