= Jos Hansen =

Luxembourgish footballer

Personal information
- Date of birth: 8 June 1932 (age 94)
- Position: Forward

International career
Years	Team	Apps	(Gls)
1952–1954	Luxembourg	8	(2)

Jos Hansen (born 8 June 1932) is a Luxembourgish former footballer. He played in eight matches for the Luxembourg national football team from 1952 to 1954. He was also part of Luxembourg's team for the 1952 Summer Olympics, and for their qualification matches for the 1954 FIFA World Cup.
