= Antoine Pazur =

French footballer (1931–2011)

Personal information
- Date of birth: 3 January 1931
- Place of birth: Aulnoye-Aymeries, France
- Date of death: 20 October 2011 (aged 80)
- Position: Defender

Senior career*
Years	Team	Apps	(Gls)
- Valenciennes-Anzin
- Lille

International career
1953	France	1	(0)
- * Club domestic league appearances and goals

Antoine Pazur (3 January 1931 – 20 October 2011) was a French footballer who played as a defender. He made one appearance for the France national team in 1953. He was also named in France's squad for the Group 4 qualification tournament for the 1954 FIFA World Cup.
