= Paul Kemp (footballer) =

Luxembourgish footballer

Personal information
- Date of birth: 27 September 1930

International career
Years	Team	Apps	(Gls)
1953–1955	Luxembourg	4	(0)

Paul Kemp (born 27 September 1930) was a Luxembourgish footballer. He played in four matches for the Luxembourg national football team from 1953 to 1955. He was also part of Luxembourg's team for their qualification matches for the 1954 FIFA World Cup.
