= Mertel =

Mertel is a German surname. Notable people with the surname include:

- Elias Mertel (ca. 1561–1626), German lutenist and composer
- Teodolfo Mertel (1806–1899), lawyer and cardinal of the Roman Catholic Church
- Heinz Mertel (born 1936), German sport shooter

== See also ==
- Mertl
