= Charles Sowa =

Luxembourgish race walker and coach

Personal information
- Nationality: Luxembourgish
- Born: 17 April 1933 Schifflange, Luxembourg
- Died: 7 July 2013 (aged 80)

Sport
- Sport: Racewalking

Charles Sowa (17 April 1933 – 7 July 2013) was a Luxembourgish race walker and coach. He was born in Schifflange.

He competed at the 1960 Summer Olympics, the 1964 Summer Olympics, the 1968 Summer Olympics and the 1972 Summer Olympics. At the 1972 Summer Olympics in Munich he placed 10th in the men's 50 kilometres walk.

He was selected male Luxembourgish Sportsperson of the Year in 1964, 1967, 1971 and 1972.
