= René Maillard (footballer) =

Swiss footballer (1923-2005)

Personal information
- Date of birth: 18 January 1923
- Place of birth: Chesalles-sur-Oron, Switzerland
- Date of death: 25 April 2005 (aged 82)
- Position: Attacking midfielder

Senior career*
Years	Team	Apps	(Gls)
1942–1957	Lausanne-Sport		

International career
1946–1951	Switzerland	14	(7)
- * Club domestic league appearances and goals

René Maillard (18 January 1923 – 25 April 2005) was a Swiss footballer who played as an attacking midfielder. He made 14 appearances for the Switzerland national team from 1946 to 1951. He was also named in Switzerland's squad for the Group 4 qualification tournament for the 1950 FIFA World Cup.
