= Jean Desgranges =

French footballer (1929–1996)

Personal information
- Date of birth: 22 April 1929
- Date of death: 10 March 1996 (aged 66)

International career
Years	Team	Apps	(Gls)
1953	France	1	(0)

Jean Desgranges (22 April 1929 – 10 March 1996) was a French footballer. He played in one match for the France national football team in 1953. He was also named in France's squad for the Group 4 qualification tournament for the 1954 FIFA World Cup.
