= Jimmy Hartnett =

Irish footballer

Personal information
- Full name: James Benedict Hartnett
- Date of birth: 21 March 1927
- Place of birth: Dublin, Ireland
- Date of death: 31 May 1988 (aged 61)
- Place of death: Middlesbrough, England
- Position: Outside left

Senior career*
Years	Team	Apps	(Gls)
–1947	St Patrick's Athletic		
1947–1948	Dundalk	13	(3)
1948–1955	Middlesbrough	48	(8)
1952–1953	→ Barry Town (loan)		
- → King's Lynn (loan)
1955–1957	Barry Town		
- → King's Lynn (loan)
1957–1958	Hartlepools United	7	(1)
1958–1959	York City	2	(1)

International career
1948	League of Ireland XI	1	(0)
1949–1954	Republic of Ireland	2	(0)
- * Club domestic league appearances and goals

James Benedict Hartnett (21 March 1927 – 31 May 1988) was an Irish professional footballer who played in the Football League for Middlesbrough, Hartlepools United and York City as an outside left. He was capped by the Republic of Ireland at international level and represented the League of Ireland XI.

== International career ==
Hartnett won two caps for the Republic of Ireland national football team and made his debut on 12 June 1949 in a 4–1 friendly defeat to Spain at Dalymount Park. His second and final cap did not come until five years later, when he played in a 1–0 win over Luxembourg in a World Cup qualifying game on 7 March 1954 at the Municipal Stadium, Luxembourg City.

== Personal life ==
Prior to joining Dundalk, Hartnett worked as an apprentice electrician at Inchicore railway works. After retiring from football, Hartnett worked as an electrician at ICI Wilton and building oil rigs at Seal Sands.

== Career statistics ==
Appearances and goals by club, season and competition
Club	Season	League			National Cup		Other		Total	
Club	Season	Division	Apps	Goals	Apps	Goals	Apps	Goals	Apps	Goals
Dundalk	1947–48	League of Ireland	13	3	1	0	3 (Note: 2 appearances in unknown competitions, 1 appearance in League of Ireland Shield)	0	17	3
Middlesbrough	1948–49	First Division	12	4	0	0	―		12	4
Middlesbrough	1949–50	First Division	11	0	0	0	―		11	0
Middlesbrough	1950–51	First Division	2	1	0	0	―		2	1
Middlesbrough	1951–52	First Division	5	0	0	0	―		5	0
Middlesbrough	1953–54	First Division	9	1	0	0	―		9	1
Middlesbrough	1954–55	Second Division	9	2	1	0	―		10	2
Middlesbrough	Total		48	8	1	0	―		49	8
Hartlepools United	1957–58	Third Division North	7	1	―		―		7	1
Career total			68	12	2	0	3	0	73	12
