= Jean-Pierre Kress =

French footballer (1930–2021)

Personal information
- Date of birth: 1 March 1930
- Place of birth: Strasbourg, France
- Date of death: 22 April 2021 (aged 91)
- Position: Goalkeeper

Senior career*
| Years | Team | Apps | (Gls) |
- Strasbourg

International career
| 1953 | France | 1 | (0) |
- * Club domestic league appearances and goals

Jean-Pierre Kress (1 March 1930 – 22 April 2021) was a French footballer who played as a goalkeeper. He made one appearance for the France national team in 1953. He was also named in France's squad for the Group 4 qualification tournament for the 1954 FIFA World Cup.
