= Lucien Karier =

Luxembourgish footballer

Personal information
- Date of birth: 7 July 1933 (age 93)

International career
Years	Team	Apps	(Gls)
1954	Luxembourg	2	(0)

Lucien Karier (born 7 July 1933) is a Luxembourgish footballer. He played in two matches for the Luxembourg national football team in 1954. He was also part of Luxembourg's team for their qualification matches for the 1954 FIFA World Cup.
