= Théo Kemp =

Luxembourgish footballer (1931–2010)

Personal information
- Date of birth: 25 September 1931
- Date of death: 4 June 2010 (aged 78)

International career
Years	Team	Apps	(Gls)
1957	Luxembourg	1	(0)

Théo Kemp (25 September 1931 – 4 June 2010) was a Luxembourgish footballer. He played in one match for the Luxembourg national football team in 1957. He was also part of Luxembourg's team for their qualification matches for the 1954 FIFA World Cup.
