= Josy Mosar =

Luxembourgish footballer (1927–2022)

Personal information
- Date of birth: 16 September 1927
- Place of birth: Holzem, Luxembourg
- Date of death: 13 August 2022 (aged 94)

International career
| Years | Team | Apps | (Gls) |
| 1952–1960 | Luxembourg | 16 | (0) |

Josy Mosar (16 September 1927 – 13 August 2022) was a Luxembourgish footballer. He played in 16 matches for the Luxembourg national football team from 1952 to 1960. He was also part of Luxembourg's team for their qualification matches for the 1954 FIFA World Cup.
