= Roger Weydert =

Luxembourgish footballer

Personal information
- Date of birth: 18 February 1927

International career
Years	Team	Apps	(Gls)
1950–1954	Luxembourg	5	(0)

Roger Weydert (born 18 February 1927) was a Luxembourgish footballer. He played in five matches for the Luxembourg national football team from 1950 to 1954. He was also part of Luxembourg's team for their qualification matches for the 1954 FIFA World Cup.
