= Guillaume Peiffer =

Luxembourgish footballer

Personal information
- Date of birth: 2 May 1928

International career
Years	Team	Apps	(Gls)
1950–1955	Luxembourg	9	(0)

Guillaume Peiffer (born 2 May 1928) was a Luxembourgish footballer. He played in nine matches for the Luxembourg national football team from 1950 to 1955. He was also part of Luxembourg's team for their qualification matches for the 1954 FIFA World Cup.
