= Caldarelli =

Caldarelli is an Italian surname. Notable people with the surname include:

- Andrea Caldarelli (born 1990), Italian racing driver
- Guido Caldarelli (born 1967), Italian physicist
- Secondo Caldarelli (1923–1978), Luxembourgish footballer
