= Raymond Cicci =

French football player and manager (1929–2012)

Personal information
- Date of birth: 11 August 1929
- Place of birth: Audun-le-Tiche, France
- Date of death: 20 February 2012 (aged 82)
- Place of death: Agde, France
- Position: Midfielder

Senior career*
Years	Team	Apps	(Gls)
1948–1951	USB Longwy	87	(11)
1951–1957	Reims	189	(7)
1957–1961	Limoges	94	(9)

International career
1953	France	1	(1)

Managerial career
- 1969–1973: RC Agde
- * Club domestic league appearances and goals

Raymond Cicci (11 August 1929 – 20 February 2012) was a French football player and manager. He played in one match for the France national football team in 1953. He was also named in France's squad for the Group 4 qualification tournament for the 1954 FIFA World Cup.
