= Marius Walter =

French footballer (1925-2020)

Personal information
- Date of birth: 5 May 1925
- Place of birth: Carvin, France
- Date of death: 2 February 2020
- Place of death: Meulan-en-Yvelines, France
- Height: 1.70 m (5 ft 7 in)

Senior career*
Years	Team	Apps	(Gls)
1945–1952	Lille	104	(40)
1952–1953	Le Havre	29	(4)
1953	Monaco	9	(2)
1954–1955	Angers	57	(16)
1956–1957	UA Sedan Torcy	16	(0)
1957–1960	Boulogne		

International career
1949–1950	France	2	(1)
- * Club domestic league appearances and goals

Marius Walter (Maik Walter né Marian Walter, 5 May 1925 – 2 February 2020) was a French footballer of Polish descents. He played in two matches for the France national football team in 1949 and 1950. He was also named in France's squad for the Group 3 qualification tournament for the 1950 FIFA World Cup.
