= Stéphane Dakowski =

French footballer (1921–2016)

Personal information
- Date of birth: 29 June 1921
- Place of birth: Provins, France
- Date of death: 11 July 2016 (aged 95)
- Position: Goalkeeper

International career
Years	Team	Apps	(Gls)
1951	France	2	(0)

Stéphane Dakowski (29 June 1921 – 11 July 2016) was a French footballer. He played in two matches for the France national football team in 1951. He was also part of France's team for their qualification matches for the 1954 FIFA World Cup.
