= Henri Fickinger =

Luxembourgish footballer

Personal information
- Date of birth: 25 July 1930
- Date of death: 3 April 1999 (aged 68)
- Position: Defender

International career
Years	Team	Apps	(Gls)
1949–1955	Luxembourg	16	(0)

Henri Fickinger (25 July 1930 – 3 April 1999) was a Luxembourgish footballer. He played in 16 matches for the Luxembourg national football team from 1949 to 1955. He was also part of Luxembourg's team for their qualification matches for the 1954 FIFA World Cup.
