= René Schneider (Swiss footballer) =

Swiss footballer (1936-2011)

- Schneider (in black) defending Servette's goal against Feyenoord in 1962

Personal information
- Date of birth: 30 November 1936
- Date of death: 18 September 2011 (aged 74)
- Position: Goalkeeper

International career
Years	Team	Apps	(Gls)
1959–1963	Switzerland	4	(0)

René Schneider (30 November 1936 – 18 September 2011) was a Swiss footballer who played as a goalkeeper. He made in four appearances for the Switzerland national team from 1959 to 1963.
