= Fabio D'Elia =

Footballer (born 1983)

Personal information
- Date of birth: 19 January 1983 (age 43)
- Place of birth: Grabs, Switzerland
- Height: 1.83 m (6 ft 0 in)
- Position: Defender

Youth career
- 1992–2001: FC Schaan

Senior career*
| Years | Team | Apps | (Gls) |
| 2001–2003 | FC Chur 97 | | |
| 2003–2006 | FC Vaduz | 49 | (6) |
| 2006–2012 | USV Eschen/Mauren | 63 | (5) |
| 2012–2015 | FC Schaan | | |
| 2015–2018 | FC Ruggell | | |

International career
| 2001–2010 | Liechtenstein | 50 | (2) |
- * Club domestic league appearances and goals

Fabio D'Elia (born 19 January 1983) is a former footballer who played as a defender. Born in Switzerland, he won 50 caps, scoring two goals for the Liechtenstein national team since his debut against Austria in a World Cup qualifier in April 2001.

== Career statistics ==
| # | Date | Venue | Opponent | Score | Result | Competition |
|---|---|---|---|---|---|---|
| 1. | 18 August 2004 | Rheinpark Stadion, Vaduz, Liechtenstein | Estonia | 1–1 | 1–2 | 2006 FIFA World Cup Qualifying |
| 2. | 12 November 2005 | Rheinpark Stadion, Vaduz, Liechtenstein | Macedonia | 1–0 | 1–2 | Friendly match |
