= René Hoffmann =

Luxembourgish footballer (1942–2019)

Personal information
- Date of birth: 4 July 1942
- Date of death: 6 November 2019 (aged 77)
- Position: Goalkeeper

Senior career*
Years	Team	Apps	(Gls)
1959–1979	Jeunesse Esch		

International career
1962–1975	Luxembourg	17	(0)
- * Club domestic league appearances and goals

René Hoffmann (4 July 1942 – 6 November 2019) was a Luxembourgish football goalkeeper.
