= Léon Spartz =

Luxembourgish footballer

Personal information
- Date of birth: 17 April 1927
- Place of birth: Lieler, Luxembourg
- Date of death: 7 August 1997 (aged 70)
- Place of death: Esch-sur-Alzette, Luxembourg
- Position: Defender

International career
Years	Team	Apps	(Gls)
- Luxembourg

Léon Spartz (17 April 1927 – 7 August 1997) was a Luxembourgish footballer. He competed in the men's tournament at the 1952 Summer Olympics.
