= Théo Stendebach =

Luxembourgish footballer

Personal information
- Date of birth: 20 April 1937 (age 89)

International career
Years	Team	Apps	(Gls)
1959–1971	Luxembourg	13	(0)

Théo Stendebach (born 20 April 1937) is a Luxembourgish footballer. He played in 13 matches for the Luxembourg national football team from 1959 to 1971.
