= Armand Müller =

Luxembourgish footballer

Personal information
- Date of birth: 26 July 1928
- Date of death: 29 June 2014 (aged 85)

International career
Years	Team	Apps	(Gls)
1949–1951	Luxembourg	4	(1)

Armand Müller (26 July 1928 – 29 June 2014) was a Luxembourgish footballer. He played in four matches for the Luxembourg national football team from 1949 to 1951. He was also part of Luxembourg's team for their qualification matches for the 1954 FIFA World Cup.
