= Jeannot Moes =

Luxembourgish footballer

Personal information
- Full name: Jeannot Moes
- Date of birth: 11 May 1948 (age 78)
- Place of birth: Luxembourg
- Position: Goalkeeper

Senior career*
Years	Team	Apps	(Gls)
1967–1989	FC Avenir Beggen		

International career^{‡}
1970–1983	Luxembourg	42	(0)
- * Club domestic league appearances and goals ‡ National team caps and goals as of 7 March 2012

Jeannot Moes (born 11 May 1948) is a retired Luxembourg footballer.

== International career ==
He is a member of the Luxembourg national football team from 1970 to 1983.
