= Jim Kremer =

Luxembourgish footballer

Personal information
- Date of birth: 18 January 1918
- Place of birth: Esch-sur-Alzette, Luxembourg
- Date of death: 24 July 2000 (aged 82)
- Place of death: Luxembourg, Luxembourg

International career
Years	Team	Apps	(Gls)
- Luxembourg

Jim Kremer (18 January 1918 – 24 July 2000) was a Luxembourgish footballer. He competed in the men's tournament at the 1948 Summer Olympics.
