= Secondo Caldarelli =

Luxembourgish footballer

Personal information
- Date of birth: 13 August 1923
- Date of death: 15 August 1978 (aged 55)
- Position: Defender

International career
Years	Team	Apps	(Gls)
1954–1955	Luxembourg	11	(0)

Secondo Caldarelli (13 August 1923 – 15 August 1978) was a Luxembourgish footballer. He played in eleven matches for the Luxembourg national football team from 1954 to 1955. He was also part of Luxembourg's team for their qualification matches for the 1954 FIFA World Cup.
