= Eugène Berger =

Luxembourgish politician (1960–2020)

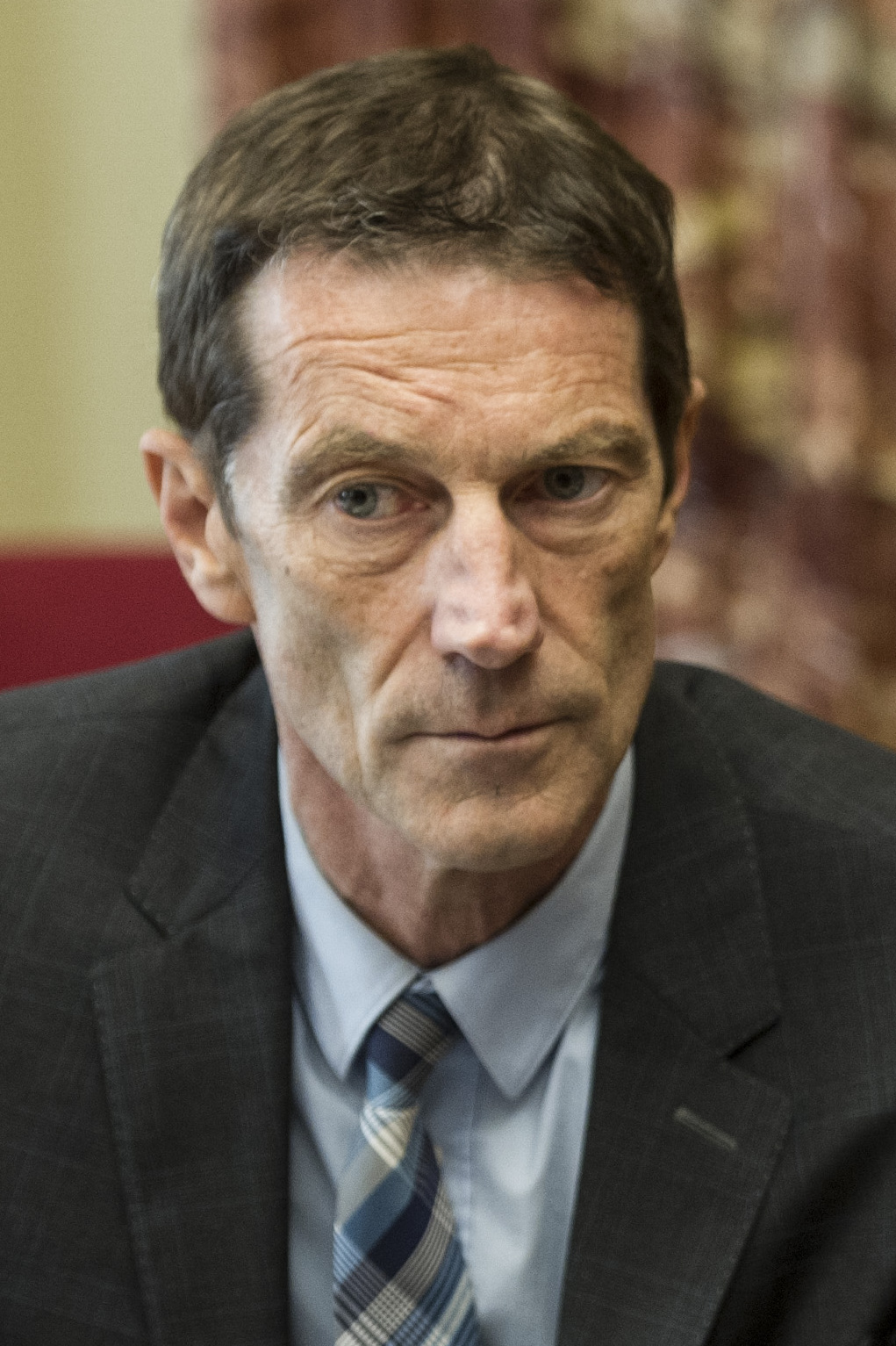
Berger in 2015

Eugène Berger (4 December 1960 – 21 January 2020) was a politician from Luxembourg. Berger studied to become a teacher, and worked in this profession from 1988 to 1994. In 1994, he was elected to the Chamber of Deputies for the Democratic Party. He was State Secretary of the Environment from 1999 to 2004.

On 1 October 1992, he became the first Luxembourger to climb Mount Everest, for which he won the title of Luxembourgish Sportsman of the Year. He had two children. When his death was announced, Luxembourg's Parliament went into recess out of respect.
