= Roland Bombardella =

Luxembourgish sprinter

Personal information
- Born: 9 July 1957 (age 68) Dudelange, Luxembourg

Sport
- Sport: Track and field

Roland Bombardella (born 9 July 1957) is a Luxembourgish soldier and retired sprinter. As an athlete, Bombardella held the national record for the 100 metres and 200 metres, and competed in the 1976 Summer Olympics, where he reached the semi-finals of the 200 metres.

He won the title of 'Luxembourgish Sportsman of the Year' in four consecutive years (1975 – 1978), a record that has not been equalled. Since 1 January 2006, he has been Luxembourg's 'High Commissioner for National Protection'. He has two twin children Sasha Bombardella and Marc Bombardella. (French: Haut-Commissaire à la Protection national).
