= John van Rijswijck =

Luxembourgish footballer

Personal information
- Full name: John van Rijswijck
- Date of birth: 16 January 1962 (age 64)
- Place of birth: Luxembourg
- Position: Goalkeeper

Senior career*
Years	Team	Apps	(Gls)
1983–1989	Jeunesse Esch		
1989–1996	Union Luxembourg		
1996–1999	CS Hobscheid	46	(0)
2000–2001	Jeunesse Esch	16	(0)
2001–2002	Swift Hesperange	11	(0)

International career^{‡}
1984–1993	Luxembourg	43	(0)
- * Club domestic league appearances and goals ‡ National team caps and goals as of 8 March 2012

John van Rijswijck (born 16 January 1962) is a former Luxembourgish football player. A goalkeeper, he played for the Luxembourg national football team from 1984 to 1993. His club career was entirely within Luxembourg, mostly for Jeunesse Esch.

== International career ==
He made his debut for Luxembourg in a May 1984 friendly match against Norway and earned a total of 43 caps, scoring no goals. His final international was a May 1993 World Cup qualification match against Iceland.
