= Jeanny Dom =

Luxembourgish table tennis player

Personal information
- Nationality: Luxembourg
- Born: 5 February 1954 (age 72) Echternach, Luxembourg

Sport
- Sport: Table tennis

Jeanny Dom (born 5 February 1954) is a retired Luxembourgish table tennis player. She is currently the General Secretary of the European Table Tennis Union. During her career, Dom won the title of Luxembourgian Sportswoman of the Year a record seven times, which is also more than the record six times Marc Girardelli won the title of Luxembourgian Sportsman of the Year.
