= Liam Munroe =

Irish footballer (1933–2024)

Personal information
- Full name: William James Munroe
- Date of birth: 28 November 1933
- Place of birth: Dublin, Ireland
- Date of death: 10 August 2024 (aged 90)
- Place of death: Dublin, Ireland
- Position: Forward

Senior career*
Years	Team	Apps	(Gls)
1952–1954	Shamrock Rovers	?	(4)
1954	RC Paris		
1954–1956	Shamrock Rovers	?	(0)
1956–1957	Ards	34	(32)
1957—1958	Bristol City	1	(0)
1958	Scunthorpe United	0	(0)
1958–1959	Distillery		
1959–1962	Dundalk	52	(27)
1962–1963	Ards	12	(1)

International career
1953–1954	League of Ireland XI	3	(0)
1953	Republic of Ireland	1	(0)
- * Club domestic league appearances and goals

William James Munroe (28 November 1933 – 10 August 2024) was an Irish professional footballer. He made his only appearance for the Republic of Ireland national team on 28 October 1953, in a 4–0 win against Luxembourg in a World Cup qualifying game at Dalymount Park.

A schoolboy international, he began his club career with Shamrock Rovers in 1952 where he was part of a great Milltown team, popularly known as Coad's Colts. In his second season, he won the League of Ireland. In November 1953 RCF Paris sought Munroe's signature.

He signed for Ards F.C. in January 1956. The following 1956–57 season was his best, as he scored 37 goals in 38 appearances. His last season was the unforgettable 1957–58 one when Ards won their one and only Irish League Championship. He only played in 15 games for Ards that season before he was transferred to Bristol City in the English Football League Division Two in December 1957 for £1,500. Munroe only played one league game for Bristol, however, before returning to Northern Ireland with Distillery.

In October 1959 he signed for Dundalk and scored a record 19 league goals that season. He returned to Ards in the 1962–63 season for a brief 12 game spell. Munroe emigrated from his native Dublin to Toronto in 1990.

Munroe died in Dublin on 10 August 2024, at the age of 90.

== Honours ==
Shamrock Rovers

- League of Ireland: 1953–54
- League of Ireland Shield: 1954–55, 1955–56
- Leinster Senior Cup: 1953, 1955

Ards

- Irish Premier League: 1957–58
- County Antrim Shield: 1956
