= René Schneider (politician) =

German politician (born 1976)

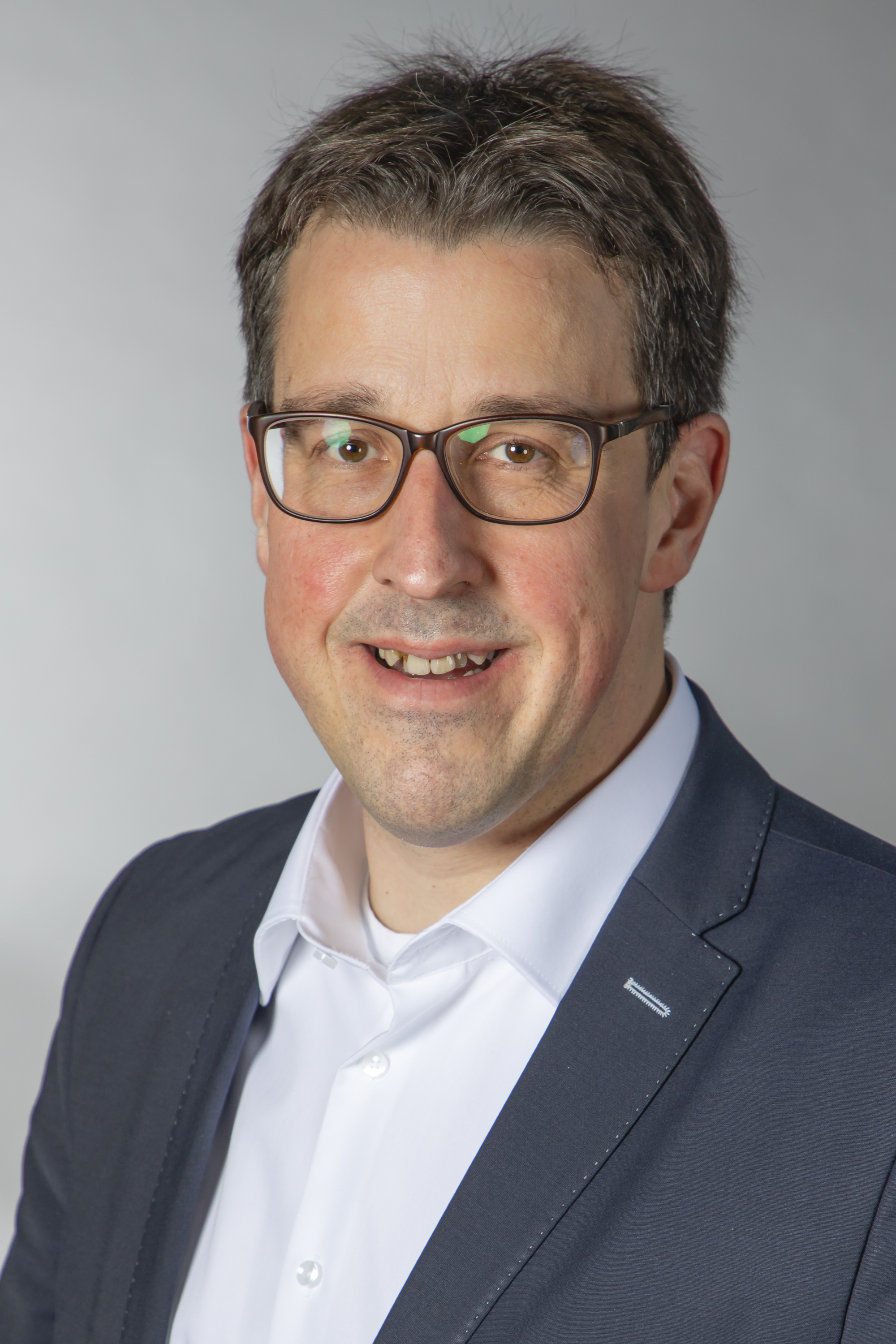
- Schneider in 2019

Member of the Landtag of North Rhine-Westphalia
- Incumbent
- Assumed office 31 May 2012
- Preceded by: Wolfgang Roth
- Constituency: Wesel II

Personal details
- Born: 18 July 1976 (age 49)
- Party: Social Democratic Party (since 1997)

René Schneider (born 18 July 1976) is a German politician serving as a member of the Landtag of North Rhine-Westphalia since 2012. He has served as chairman of the Social Democratic Party in Wesel since 2015.
