= Serge Jentgen =

Luxembourgish footballer

Personal information
- Date of birth: 28 January 1962 (age 64)
- Position: Midfielder

Senior career*
Years	Team	Apps	(Gls)
1983–1994	Avenir Beggen		
1994–1995	CS Pétange		

International career
1983–1984	Luxembourg	6	(0)
- * Club domestic league appearances and goals

Serge Jentgen (born 28 January 1962) is a retired Luxembourgish football midfielder.
