= Nicolas May =

Luxembourgish footballer (1927–2006)

Personal information
- Date of birth: 30 September 1927
- Place of birth: Niederkorn, Luxembourg
- Date of death: 12 January 2006 (aged 78)
- Place of death: Luxembourg, Luxembourg

International career
Years	Team	Apps	(Gls)
- Luxembourg

Nicolas May (30 September 1927 – 12 January 2006) was a Luxembourgish footballer. He competed in the men's tournament at the 1948 Summer Olympics.
