= Jean-Pierre Barboni =

Luxembourgish footballer

Personal information
- Date of birth: 6 September 1958 (age 68)
- Position: Midfielder

Senior career*
Years	Team	Apps	(Gls)
1975–1990	Jeunesse Esch		

International career
1983–1988	Luxembourg	26	(0)

Managerial career
- 2000–2002: Jeunesse Esch
- * Club domestic league appearances and goals

Jean-Pierre Barboni (born 6 September 1958) is a Luxembourgish former footballer who played as a midfielder.
