= René Schneider (Luxembourgish footballer) =

Luxembourgish footballer

Personal information
- Date of birth: 20 April 1938 (age 88)
- Position: Midfielder

International career
Years	Team	Apps	(Gls)
1959–1966	Luxembourg	29	(1)

René Schneider (born 20 April 1938) is a Luxembourgish footballer who played as a midfielder. He made 29 appearances for the Luxembourg national team from 1959 to 1966. He was captain of the team which won 4–2 against Portugal with Eusébio.
