= Ahmed Mihoubi =

French footballer (born 1924)

Personal information
- Date of birth: 2 June 1924
- Place of birth: Fort-de-l'Eau, French Algeria (now Bordj El Kiffan, Algeria)
- Date of death: 24 January 2024 (aged 99)
- Position: Defender

Senior career*
Years	Team	Apps	(Gls)
- RU Alger
1946–1953	Sète		
1953–1954	Toulouse		
1954–1955	Lyon		
1955–1957	Sète		

International career
1953	France	1	(0)
- * Club domestic league appearances and goals

Ahmed Mihoubi (2 June 1924 – 24 January 2004) was a French footballer who played as a defender.
