= Paul Steffen =

Luxembourgish footballer

- Steffen playing for Luxembourg in 1962

Personal information
- Date of birth: 17 January 1930
- Place of birth: Esch-sur-Alzette, Luxembourg
- Date of death: 27 January 2017 (aged 87)
- Position: Goalkeeper

International career
Years	Team	Apps	(Gls)
1953–1962	Luxembourg	32	(0)

Paul Steffen (17 January 1930 – 27 January 2017) was a Luxembourgish footballer. He played in 32 matches for the Luxembourg national football team from 1953 to 1962. He was also part of Luxembourg's squad for the football tournament at the 1948 Summer Olympics, but he did not play in any matches.
