= Robert Mond (footballer) =

Luxembourgish footballer (1927–1985)

Robert Mond (13 December 1927 – 17 February 1985) was a Luxembourgish professional footballer who played as defender. In club football he played for Jeunesse Esch from 1948 to 1960. For the Luxembourg national team he played 33 matches and scored 3 goals in the period from 1949 to 1959 and was selected as captain three times. Of the three goals scored they were all from the penalty spot. He also missed one spot kick in a match against Germany on 20 April 1952 in Luxembourg City where Luxembourg lost 3–0.
