= Elizabeth May (triathlete) =

Luxembourgish triathlete (born 1983)

Liz May
Medal record

Representing Luxembourg

Women's triathlon

ETU Triathlon European Championships
Silver medal – second place	2009 Holten	Elite
Bronze medal – third place	2006 Rijeka	U23
Bronze medal – third place	2003 Echternach	U23
Bronze medal – third place	2002 Cancun	Junior

Women's aquathlon

ITU Aquathlon World Championships
Gold medal – first place	2011 Beijing	Elite
Silver medal – second place	2004 Madeira	Elite
Silver medal – second place	2003 Queenstown	Elite
Gold medal – first place	2002 Cancun	Junior

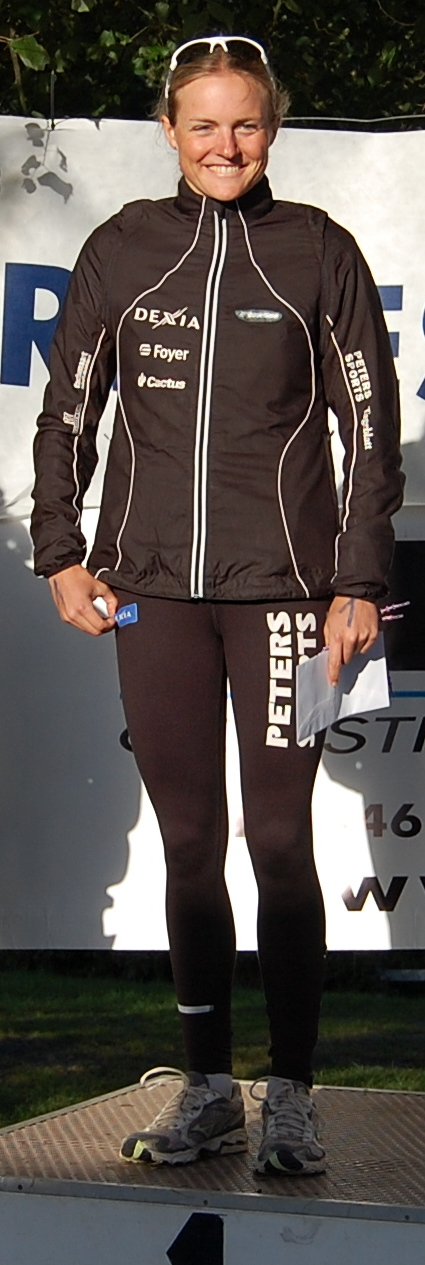
Elizabeth May on the women's overall podium of the 2007 International Weiswampach Triathlon.

Elizabeth Nicola "Liz" Holst May (born 27 July 1983 in Luxembourg City) is a female athlete from Luxembourg, who competed in triathlon from 2000 to 2013. May is a 2011 Aquathlon World Champion and is a 2009 European Championship silver medalist. May competed at the Olympic triathlon at the 2004 Summer Olympics and 2008 Summer Olympics. She finished in seventeenth place in Athens with a total time of 2:08:29.22.

May is of Danish descent. She was educated at the European School (ESL) in Luxembourg City and has a Master of Laws from the University of Copenhagen.

== Notable results ==
- 2011: 13th at the ITU World Cup, Yokohama JAP
- 2010: 11th at the ITU World Cup, Madrid ESP
- 2009: 4th at the ITU World Cup, London GBR
- 2009: 7th at the ITU World Cup, Yokohama JAP
- 2008: 5th at the ITU World Cup, Lorient FRA
- 2008: 5th at the ITU World Cup, Kitzbühl AUT
- 2008: 6th at the ITU World Cup, Madrid ESP
- 2008: 11th at the ITU World Cup, Richards Bay RSA
- 2008: 14th at the Triathlon World Championships, Vancouver CAN
- 2008: 41st at the Beijing 2008 Olympic Games
- 2007: 9th at the ITU World Cup, Beijing CHN
- 2007: 15th at the Triathlon World Championships, Hamburg GER
- 2007: 5th at the ITU World Cup, Vancouver CAN
- 2007: 5th at the ITU World Cup, Madrid ESP
- 2007: 4th at the ITU World Cup, Richards Bay RSA
- 2006: 3rd at the ITU World Cup, Beijing CHN
- 2006: 14th at the ITU World Cup, Hamburg GER
- 2006: 15th at the Triathlon World Championships, Lausanne SWR
