= Eric Hoffmann =

Luxembourgish association football player

Personal information
- Date of birth: 21 June 1984 (age 42)
- Place of birth: Luxembourg
- Height: 1.76 m (5 ft 9 in)
- Position: Right back

Senior career*
Years	Team	Apps	(Gls)
2001–2002	Orania Vianden		
2002–2009	Etzella Ettelbruck	128	(10)
2009–2016	Jeunesse Esch	165	(8)
2016–2018	FC UNA Strassen	37	(1)
2018–2019	US Hostert	25	(1)
2019–2021	FC Lorentzweiler	13	(1)
Total		368	(21)

International career^{‡}
2002–2014	Luxembourg	88	(0)
- * Club domestic league appearances and goals as of 7 July 2022 ‡ National team caps and goals as of 11 October 2015

Eric Hoffmann (born 21 June 1984) is a Luxembourgish football player who last played for FC Lorentzweiler.

== Club career ==
Hoffmann started his career at lower league side Orania Vianden before joining Etzella for the 2002/2003 season. He won promotion to the Luxembourg National Division in his first season and lost two successive cup finals in 2003 and 2004.

== International career ==
He made his debut for Luxembourg in a March 2002 friendly match against Latvia, aged 17 and still only playing at Orania Vianden in Luxembourg's third division. At the end of his international career he had earned 88 caps, scoring no goals. He played in 15 FIFA World Cup qualification matches.
