= Ferd Lahure =

Luxembourgish footballer (1929–2019)

Personal information
- Date of birth: 28 March 1929
- Place of birth: Niederkorn, Luxembourg
- Date of death: 23 March 2019 (aged 89)

International career
Years	Team	Apps	(Gls)
- Luxembourg

Fernand "Ferd" Lahure (28 March 1929 – 23 March 2019) was a Luxembourgish football goalkeeper. He competed in the men's tournament at the 1952 Summer Olympics.
