= Sylvie Hülsemann =

Luxembourgish water skier (born 1944)

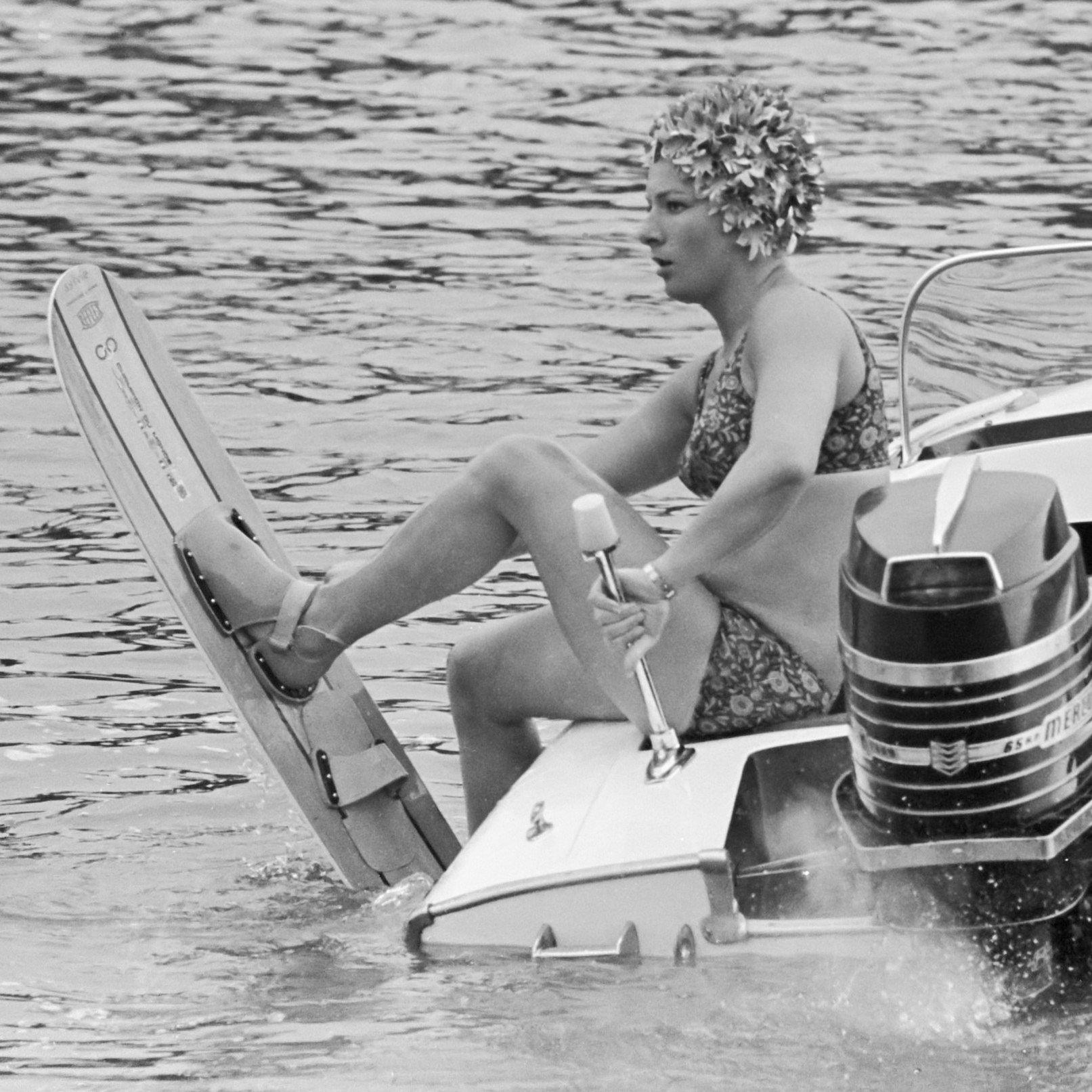
Sylvie Hülsemann (1967)

Sylvie Hülsemann (born 1944) is a retired Luxembourgish water skier. She won the world championship on her second attempt, in 1961, at the age of 16. In addition, she was the European Women's Overall Champion in 1961, 1966, and 1968.

== Sporting career details ==
First international competition: 1957, Juan-les-Pins, France. Last international competition: 1979, Malines/Mechelen, Belgium.

During 23 years of international competition, Sylvie amassed more than 90 wins, 60 second places and 30 third places. In addition, she was national champion in all events from 1959 to 1976 and she is, to this day, holder of all the national records.

In 8 participations in the biennial World Championships from 1959 to 1977, she won 2 gold medals, 2 silvers and 1 bronze.

In 13 participations in the European Championships from 1959 to 1977 she won 9 gold medals, 6 silvers and 11 bronzes.

During this period, she received the following European (World Water Ski Union Group 2) awards: Diamond ski 1965, 1966, 1968. Gold ski 1967, 1971. Silver ski 1974

She came fourth in the women's tricks at the 1972 Summer Olympics in Kiel, Germany. In 1972 water skiing was a demonstration sport at the Olympics.

In 1997, Sylvie was elected to the IWSF (International Water Ski Federation) Hall of Fame.
