= Fonsy Grethen =

Luxembourgish carom billiards player (born 1960)

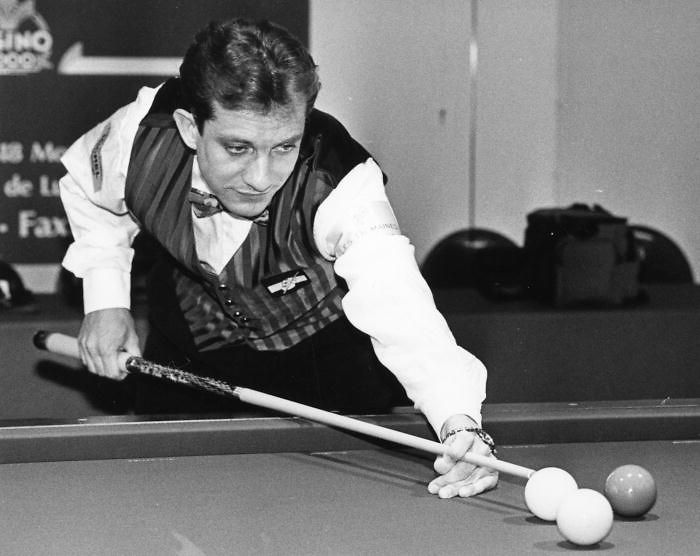
Fonsy Grethen

Fonsy Grethen (born 20 September 1960, in Luxembourg City) is a Luxembourgish carom billiards player. During his career, he won four world titles and thirteen European titles.
