= Gordon Braun =

Luxembourgish footballer (born 1977)

Personal information
- Date of birth: 25 July 1977 (age 49)
- Position: Forward

Senior career*
| Years | Team | Apps | (Gls) |
- Union Luxembourg
- Jeunesse Esch
- F91 Dudelange

International career
| 1998–2004 | Luxembourg | 34 | (1) |
- * Club domestic league appearances and goals

Gordon Braun (born 25 July 1977) is a Luxembourgish retired footballer who played as a forward.

He spent his club career entirely within his own country, with Union Luxembourg, Jeunesse Esch and F91 Dudelange, in two spells at each of the last two.

Braun represented the Luxembourg national team on 34 occasions, starting with a 2–0 friendly loss at home to Cameroon on 31 May 1998. His one goal for the country came in his 32nd match, a 4–3 loss to Latvia on 8 September 2004 in 2006 FIFA World Cup qualification, also at the Stade Josy Barthel.

Braun ran for a place on the board of directors of the Luxembourg Football Federation in 2011.

He is the son of Nico Braun, also an international striker, who played abroad for clubs such as Schalke 04 of Germany.

== Career statistics ==
| # | Date | Venue | Opponent | Score | Result | Competition |
|---|---|---|---|---|---|---|
| 1. | 8 September 2004 | Stade Josy Barthel, Luxembourg City, Luxembourg | Latvia | 1–1 | 3–4 | 2006 FIFA World Cup qualification |
