= Charles Leweck =

Luxembourgish footballer

Personal information
- Full name: Charles Leweck
- Date of birth: 19 July 1983 (age 43)
- Place of birth: Luxembourg
- Height: 1.73 m (5 ft 8 in)
- Position: Right winger

Youth career
- –2003: FC Young-Boys Diekirch

Senior career*
Years	Team	Apps	(Gls)
2003–2010	FC Etzella Ettelbruck	147	(25)
2010–2011	Jeunesse Esch	24	(4)
2011–2014	FC Etzella Ettelbruck	93	(19)

International career
2004–2012	Luxembourg	38	(0)
- * Club domestic league appearances and goals

Charles Leweck (born 19 July 1983) is a Luxembourgish footballer who previously played for FC Etzella Ettelbruck.

== Club career ==
A midfielder, Leweck played for Etzella from 2003 until 2014, after joining them from FC Young-Boys Diekirch.

== International career ==
Leweck made his debut for Luxembourg in 2004 and went on to earn 38 caps, no goal scored. He played in 11 FIFA World Cup qualification matches.

He played his final international game so far in November 2012, a 1–2 friendly defeat by Scotland.

== Personal life ==
He is the younger brother of Alphonse Leweck, who also plays in midfield for Etzella and Luxembourg.
