= Manou Schauls =

Luxembourgish footballer (born 1972)

Personal information
- Date of birth: 13 February 1972 (age 54)
- Place of birth: Luxembourg
- Height: 1.84 m (6 ft 1/2 in)
- Position: Defender

Senior career*
Years	Team	Apps	(Gls)
1997–1998	Swift Hesperange		
1998–2007	Jeunesse Esch		
2007–2009	FC Differdange 03		

International career^{‡}
1997–2005	Luxembourg	37	(1)
- * Club domestic league appearances and goals ‡ National team caps and goals as of 2 December 2013

Manou Schauls (born 13 February 1972) is a previous defender of Luxembourg's football team. He retired in 2005.

== International career ==
He was a member of the Luxembourg national football team from 1997 to 2005.
