= Michel Reuter =

Luxembourgish footballer

Personal information
- Date of birth: 24 November 1929
- Place of birth: Kayl, Luxembourg
- Date of death: 6 October 2008 (aged 78)
- Place of death: Luxembourg, Luxembourg
- Position: Defender

International career
Years	Team	Apps	(Gls)
- Luxembourg

Michel Reuter (24 November 1929 – 6 October 2008) was a Luxembourgish footballer. He competed in the men's tournament at the 1952 Summer Olympics.
