= Claude Reiter =

Luxembourgish footballer (born 1981)

Personal information
- Date of birth: 2 July 1981 (age 45)
- Place of birth: Luxembourg
- Height: 1.82 m (6 ft 0 in)
- Position: Centre-back

Youth career
- –1999: Rambrouch

Senior career*
Years	Team	Apps	(Gls)
1999–2005	Union Luxembourg	151	(3)
2005–2007	Jeunesse Esch	42	(4)
2007–2010	Etzella Ettelbruck	41	(0)
Total		234	(7)

International career
2000–2008	Luxembourg	37	(1)
- * Club domestic league appearances and goals

Claude Reiter (born 2 July 1981) is a Luxembourgish former footballer who played as a centre-back.

== Club career ==
Reiter began his career at local club Rambrouch. He moved to Union Luxembourg in 1999. In 2005, he was signed by Jeunesse Esch. He left Jeunesse for Etzella Ettelbruck in summer 2007.

== International career ==
Reiter made his debut for Luxembourg in April 2000, a friendly match against Estonia. He scored his first goal for Luxembourg in a 2006 World Cup qualifying match against Russia in 2005. In total he earned 37 caps, scoring one goal.

== Career statistics ==
Scores and results list Luxembourg's goal tally first.

#	Date	Venue	Opponent	Score	Result	Competition
1	8 October 2005	Moscow, Russia	Russia	1–2	1–5	2006 World Cup qualifying
