= Camille Wagner =

Luxembourgish footballer

Personal information
- Date of birth: 13 April 1925
- Place of birth: Schifflange, Luxembourg
- Date of death: 7 February 2014 (aged 88)
- Place of death: Luxembourg City, Luxembourg

International career
Years	Team	Apps	(Gls)
- Luxembourg

Camille Wagner (13 April 1925 – 7 February 2014) was a Luxembourgish footballer. He competed in the men's tournament at the 1952 Summer Olympics.
