= Alphonse Leweck =

Luxembourgish footballer (born 1981)

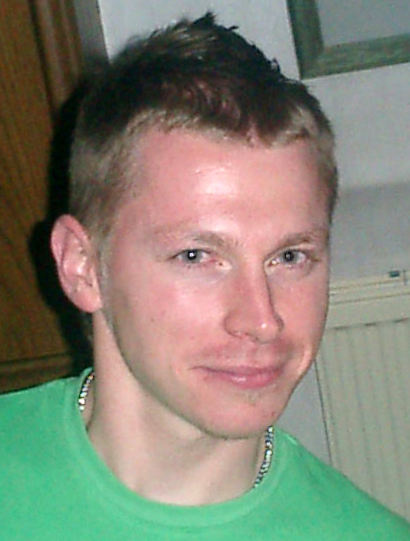
- Leweck in 2006

Personal information
- Date of birth: 16 December 1981 (age 44)
- Place of birth: Luxembourg
- Height: 1.71 m (5 ft 7 in)
- Position: Right winger

Youth career
- –2001: Young-Boys Diekirch

Senior career*
Years	Team	Apps	(Gls)
2001–2010	Etzella Ettelbruck	160	(36)
2010–2011	Jeunesse Esch	10	(0)
2011–2014	Etzella Ettelbruck	33	(4)
2014–2018	FC Erpeldange 72	33	(5)
Total		236	(45)

International career
2002–2009	Luxembourg	51	(4)
- * Club domestic league appearances and goals

Alphonse Leweck (born 16 December 1981) is a Luxembourgish former footballer who played as a right winger. He was a member of the Luxembourg national team. He is the elder brother of Charles Leweck and Jim Leweck.

== Club career ==
As a midfielder, Leweck began his career at Young-Boys Diekirch. In 2001, he moved to Etzella Ettelbruck in National Division. Leweck was close to retiring from football after being diagnosed with a serious fault with a heart valve, which cost him a chance to go on a trial with Bundesliga club Borussia Mönchengladbach.

== International career ==
Leweck made his debut for Luxembourg in a February 2002 friendly match against Albania. After a long departure, Leweck returned to his first match, where he scored the winning goal in the 94th minute against Belarus on 13 October 2007. The goal was the first win for Luxembourg in a UEFA European Championship qualification since 1995. He scored another goal, this time in a 2010 FIFA World Cup qualifier, a 2–1 win over Switzerland. He went on to earn 51 caps, scoring 4 goals.

== Personal life ==
He has two brothers, Charles Leweck and Jim Leweck, who are also footballers, Charles being a midfielder for FC Etzella Ettelbruck. He also works as a cook in the family hotel.

== Career statistics ==
Scores and results list Luxembourg's goal tally first.

#	Date	Venue	Opponent	Score	Result	Competition
1	8 September 2004	Stade Josy Barthel, Luxembourg, Luxembourg	Latvia	2–2	3–4	2006 World Cup qualifying
2	13 October 2007	Central Stadion, Gomel, Belarus	Belarus	1–0	1–0	2008 Euro qualifying
3	27 May 2008	Stade Josy Barthel, Luxembourg, Luxembourg	Cape Verde	1–0	1–1	friendly match
4	10 September 2008	Letzigrund, Zürich, Switzerland	Switzerland	2–1	2–1	2010 World Cup qualifying
