= Jean-Pierre Mertl =

Luxembourgish footballer

Personal information
- Full name: Jean-Pierre Mertl
- Date of birth: 23 April 1930
- Date of death: 31 October 2012 (aged 82)
- Position: Defender

Senior career*
Years	Team	Apps	(Gls)
1951–1956	Rumelange		
1956–1967	Union Luxembourg		

International career
1951–1960	Luxembourg	20	(1)
- * Club domestic league appearances and goals

Jean-Pierre Mertl (23 April 1930 – 31 October 2012) was a Luxembourgish footballer. A defender, he played for the Luxembourg national football team and two club sides.

== Club career ==
Mertl began playing for Rumelange in 1951 before moving to Union Luxembourg in 1956. There he won one Luxembourg National Division title and three Luxembourg Cups.

== International career ==
Mertl first played for Luxembourg in 1951 in a defeat against West Germany. He went on to appear 20 times for Luxembourg and scored one goal in his international career in a match against a Portugal B-team.

== Honours ==
- Luxembourg National Division: 1

1961–62

- Luxembourg Cup: 3

1958–59, 1962–63, 1963–64
