= Luxembourg national football team results (2000–2019) =

- Win Draw Loss

This is a list of the Luxembourg national football team results from 2000 to the end of 2019.

== 2000s ==
=== 2000 ===
23 February 2000 Friendly	Luxembourg	1–3	Northern Ireland	Luxembourg City, Luxembourg
20:30 CET	Cardoni 41'	Report	Healy 20', 47'; Quinn 86'	Stadium: Stade Josy Barthel; Attendance: 1,818; Referee: Manfred Schüttengruber (Austria)

26 April 2000 Friendly	Luxembourg	1–1	Estonia	Luxembourg City, Luxembourg
20:00 CEST	Vanek 90'	Report	Oper 84'	Stadium: Stade Josy Barthel; Attendance: 1,100; Referee: Roelof Luinge (Netherlands)

7 June 2000 Friendly	Luxembourg	0–1	Spain	Luxembourg City, Luxembourg
20:00 CEST		Report	Mendieta 2'	Stadium: Stade Josy Barthel; Attendance: 6,000; Referee: Herbert Fandel (Germany)

3 September 2000 2002 FIFA World Cup qualification	Luxembourg	0–2	FR Yugoslavia	Luxembourg City, Luxembourg
18:00 CEST		Report	Milošević 4'; Jokanović 26'	Stadium: Stade Josy Barthel; Attendance: 3,305; Referee: Sergey Shmolik (Belarus)

7 October 2000 2002 FIFA World Cup qualification	Luxembourg	1–2	Slovenia	Luxembourg City, Luxembourg
19:15 CEST	Strasser 46'	Report	Zahovič 35'; Milinovič 37'	Stadium: Stade Josy Barthel; Attendance: 1,788; Referee: Michal Benes (Czech Republic)

11 October 2000 2002 FIFA World Cup qualification	Russia	3–0	Luxembourg	Moscow, Russia
17:00 CEST	Buznikin 19'; Khokhlov 57'; Titov 90'	Report		Stadium: Dynamo Stadium; Attendance: 12,000; Referee: John Ferry (Northern Ireland)

=== 2001 ===
28 February 2001 Friendly	Luxembourg	0–1	Finland	Luxembourg City, Luxembourg
20:00 CET		Report	Forssell 77'	Stadium: Stade Josy Barthel; Attendance: 1,674; Referee: Roland Beck (Liechtenstein)

24 March 2001 2002 FIFA World Cup qualification	Luxembourg	0–2	Faroe Islands	Luxembourg City, Luxembourg
18:00 CET		Report	Jacobsen 78'; Mørkøre 82'	Stadium: Stade Josy Barthel; Attendance: 2,380; Referee: Attila Hanacsek (Hungary)

28 March 2001 2002 FIFA World Cup qualification	Switzerland	5–0	Luxembourg	Zürich, Switzerland
20:15 CEST	Frei 9', 31', 90'; Lonfat 64'; Chapuisat 72'	Report		Stadium: Hardturm; Attendance: 8,600; Referee: Claus Bo Larsen (Denmark)

2 June 2001 2002 FIFA World Cup qualification	Slovenia	2–0	Luxembourg	Ljubljana, Slovenia
20:15 CEST	Zahovič 34', 65' (pen.)	Report		Stadium: Stadion za Bežigradom; Attendance: 4,500; Referee: Bernhard Brugger (Austria)

6 June 2001 2002 FIFA World Cup qualification	Luxembourg	1–2	Russia	Luxembourg City, Luxembourg
20:00 CEST	Schneider 49'	Report	Alenichev 16'; Semak 76'	Stadium: Stade Josy Barthel; Attendance: 2,025; Referee: Jon Skjervold (Norway)

15 August 2001 Friendly	Luxembourg	0–3	Georgia	Mondercange, Luxembourg
17:00 CEST		Report	Demetradze 19', 50'; Aleksidze 69'	Stadium: Stade Nouveau; Attendance: 1,700; Referee: Terje Hauge (Norway)

1 September 2001 2002 FIFA World Cup qualification	Faroe Islands	1–0	Luxembourg	Toftir, Faroe Islands
18:00 CEST	J.K. Hansen 84'	Report		Stadium: Svangaskarð; Attendance: 1,464; Referee: Željko Širić (Croatia)

5 September 2001 2002 FIFA World Cup qualification	Luxembourg	0–3	Switzerland	Luxembourg City, Luxembourg
20:15 CEST		Report	Frei 12'; Türkyilmaz 58', 84'	Stadium: Stade Josy Barthel; Attendance: 3,858; Referee: Sorin Corpodean (Romania)

6 October 2001 2002 FIFA World Cup qualification	FR Yugoslavia	6–2	Luxembourg	Belgrade, FR Yugoslavia
16:00 CEST	Jokanović 19'; Mijatović 57'; Kežman 61', 71'; Milošević 62', 68'	Report	Peters 38'; Christophe 52'	Stadium: Stadion FK Partizan; Attendance: 1,758; Referee: Leslie Irvine (Northern Ireland)

=== 2002 ===
13 February 2002 Friendly	Luxembourg	0–0	Albania	Hesperange, Luxembourg
20:00 CET		Report		Stadium: Stade Alphonse Theis; Attendance: 1,300; Referee: René Rogalla (Switzerland)

27 March 2002 Friendly	Luxembourg	0–3	Latvia	Hesperange, Luxembourg
20:00 CET		Report	Rubins 24'; Laizāns 58'; Koļesņičenko 71'	Stadium: Stade Alphonse Theis; Attendance: 1,800; Referee: Wolfgang Sowa (Austria)

17 April 2002 Friendly	Luxembourg	3–3	Liechtenstein	Hesperange, Luxembourg
20:15 CEST	Strasser 39'; Christophe 69'; Cardoni 83'	Report	Stocklasa 6', 26', 37'	Stadium: Stade Alphonse Theis; Attendance: 1,653; Referee: Jan Wegereef (Netherlands)

21 August 2002 Friendly	Luxembourg	0–2	Morocco	Luxembourg City, Luxembourg
20:00 CEST		Report; Report	Jabrane 71'; Kacemi 85'	Stadium: Stade Josy Barthel; Attendance: 1,654; Referee: Edgar Steinborn (Germany)

5 September 2002 Friendly	Luxembourg	0–5	Israel	Luxembourg City, Luxembourg
20:00 CEST		Report	Udi 1', 68'; Badir 24'; Keisi 79'; Benayoun 85'	Stadium: Stade Josy Barthel; Attendance: 1,354; Referee: Paul Allaerts (Belgium)

12 October 2002 UEFA Euro 2004 qualifying	Denmark	2–0	Luxembourg	Copenhagen, Denmark
19:15 CEST	Tomasson 52' (pen.); Sand 72'	Report		Stadium: Parken Stadium; Attendance: 40,259; Referee: Ferenc Bede (Hungary)

16 October 2002 UEFA Euro 2004 qualifying	Luxembourg	0–7	Romania	Luxembourg City, Luxembourg
20:00 CEST		Report	Moldovan 2', 5'; Rădoi 25'; Contra 45', 47', 86'; Ghioane 81'	Stadium: Stade Josy Barthel; Attendance: 2,056; Referee: Romans Lajuks (Latvia)

20 November 2002 Friendly	Luxembourg	0–0	Cape Verde	Hesperange, Luxembourg
20:00 CET		Report		Stadium: Stade Alphonse Theis; Attendance: 2,751; Referee: Damien Ledentu (France)

=== 2003 ===
29 March 2003 UEFA Euro 2004 qualifying	Bosnia and Herzegovina	2–0	Luxembourg	Zenica, Bosnia and Herzegovina
20:15 CET	Bolić 58'; Barbarez 75'	Report		Stadium: Bilino Polje; Attendance: 7,380; Referee: Jouni Hyytiä (Finland)

2 April 2003 UEFA Euro 2004 qualifying	Luxembourg	0–2	Norway	Luxembourg City, Luxembourg
20:00 CEST		Report	Rushfeldt 57'; Solskjær 73'	Stadium: Stade Josy Barthel; Attendance: 2,899; Referee: Ivan Dobrinov (Bulgaria)

30 April 2003 Friendly	Hungary	5–1	Luxembourg	Budapest, Hungary
20:15 CEST	Gera 18'; Szabics 50', 90+2'; Lisztes 61', 68'	Report	Strasser 26'	Stadium: Szusza Ferenc Stadion; Attendance: 1,205; Referee: Damir Skomina (Slovenia)

11 June 2003 UEFA Euro 2004 qualifying	Luxembourg	0–2	Denmark	Luxembourg City, Luxembourg
20:00 CEST		Report	Jensen 2'; Gravesen 50'	Stadium: Stade Josy Barthel; Attendance: 6,869; Referee: Yuri Baskakov (Russia)

19 August 2003 Friendly	Luxembourg	1–1	Malta	Esch-sur-Alzette, Luxembourg
20:00 CEST	Strasser 53' (pen.)	Report	Giglio 54'	Stadium: Stade de la Frontière; Attendance: 2,000; Referee: Gerald Lehner (Austria)

6 September 2003 UEFA Euro 2004 qualifying	Romania	4–0	Luxembourg	Ploieşti, Romania
18:30 CEST	Mutu 38'; Pancu 40'; Ganea 43'; Bratu 77'	Report		Stadium: Stadionul Astra; Attendance: 2,457; Referee: Alon Yefet (Israel)

10 September 2003 UEFA Euro 2004 qualifying	Luxembourg	0–1	Bosnia and Herzegovina	Luxembourg City, Luxembourg
20:00 CEST		Report	Barbarez 35'	Stadium: Stade Josy Barthel; Attendance: 3,425; Referee: Costas Kapitanis (Cyprus)

11 October 2003 UEFA Euro 2004 qualifying	Norway	1–0	Luxembourg	Oslo, Norway
18:00 CEST	Flo 18'	Report		Stadium: Ullevaal Stadion; Attendance: 22,255; Referee: Zsolt Szabó (Hungary)

20 November 2003 Friendly	Luxembourg	1–2	Moldova	Hesperange, Luxembourg
20:00 CET	Schauls 78'	Report	Golban 19'; Dadu 90+2'	Stadium: Stade Alphonse Theis; Attendance: 623; Referee: Laurent Duhamel (France)

=== 2004 ===
24 February 2004 Friendly	Faroe Islands	4–2	Luxembourg	San Fernando, Spain
16:00 CET	Petersen 46', 52'; Olsen 74'; Johnsson 90'	Report	Peters 35'; Huss 80'	Stadium: Estadio Municipal Bahía Sur; Attendance: 100; Referee: Abraham Abad (Spain)

31 March 2004 Friendly	Luxembourg	1–2	Bosnia and Herzegovina	Luxembourg City, Luxembourg
20:00 CEST	Huss 87'	Report	Misimović 61'; Bolić 71'	Stadium: Stade Josy Barthel; Attendance: 2,000; Referee: René Rogalla (Switzerland)

28 April 2004 Friendly	Austria	4–1	Luxembourg	Innsbruck, Austria
20:30 CEST	Kirchler 5'; Kiesenebner 9'; Haas 85'; Kollmann 88'	Report	Huss 63'	Stadium: Tivoli-Neu; Attendance: 9,400; Referee: Damir Skomina (Slovenia)

29 May 2004 Friendly	Portugal	3–0	Luxembourg	Águeda, Portugal
20:15 CEST	Figo 13'; Gomes 28'; Costa 36'	Report		Stadium: Estádio Municipal de Águeda; Attendance: 9,000; Referee: Rob Styles (England)

18 August 2004 2006 FIFA World Cup qualification	Slovakia	3–1	Luxembourg	Bratislava, Slovakia
20:15 CEST	Vittek 26'; Greško 48'; Demo 89'	Report	Strasser 2'	Stadium: Tehelné pole Attendance: 5,016; Referee: Viktor Kassai (Hungary)

4 September 2004 2006 FIFA World Cup qualification	Estonia	4–0	Luxembourg	Tallinn, Estonia
18:00 CEST	Teever 7'; Schauls 41' (o.g.); Oper 61'; Viikmäe 67'	Report		Stadium: A. Le Coq Arena; Attendance: 3,000; Referee: Alan Kelly (Ireland)

8 September 2004 2006 FIFA World Cup qualification	Luxembourg	3–4	Latvia	Luxembourg City, Luxembourg
20:00 CEST	Braun 11'; Leweck 55'; Cardoni 62'	Report	Verpakovskis 4'; Zemļinskis 40' (pen.); Hoffmann 65' (o.g.); Prohorenkovs 67'	Stadium: Stade Josy Barthel; Attendance: 2,125; Referee: George Kasnaferis (Greece)

9 October 2004 2006 FIFA World Cup qualification	Luxembourg	0–4	Russia	Luxembourg City, Luxembourg
17:00 CEST		Report	Sychev 56', 69', 86'; Arshavin 62'	Stadium: Stade Josy Barthel; Attendance: 3,670; Referee: Eric Braamhaar (Netherlands)

13 October 2004 2006 FIFA World Cup qualification	Luxembourg	0–4	Liechtenstein	Luxembourg City, Luxembourg
20:00 CEST		Report	Stocklasa 41'; Burgmeier 44', 85'; M. Frick 57' (pen.)	Stadium: Stade Josy Barthel; Attendance: 3,478; Referee: Jaroslav Jára (Czech Republic)

17 November 2004 2006 FIFA World Cup qualification	Luxembourg	0–5	Portugal	Luxembourg City, Luxembourg
20:00 CET		Report	Federspiel 11' (o.g.); Ronaldo 28'; Maniche 52'; Pauleta 67', 82'	Stadium: Stade Josy Barthel; Attendance: 8,045; Referee: Vitaliy Godulyan (Ukraine)

=== 2005 ===
30 March 2005 2006 FIFA World Cup qualification	Latvia	4–0	Luxembourg	Riga, Latvia
19:00 CEST	Bleidelis 32'; Laizāns 38' (pen.); Verpakovskis 73', 90'	Report		Stadium: Skonto stadions Attendance: 8,203; Referee: Draženko Kovačić (Croatia)

8 June 2005 2006 FIFA World Cup qualification	Luxembourg	0–4	Slovakia	Luxembourg City, Luxembourg
20:00 CEST		Report	Németh 5'; Mintál 15'; Kisel 54'; Reiter 60'	Stadium: Stade Josy Barthel; Attendance: 2,108; Referee: Rob Styles (England)

3 September 2005 2006 FIFA World Cup qualification	Portugal	6–0	Luxembourg	Faro, Portugal
21:15 CEST	Andrade 24'; Carvalho 30'; Pauleta 38', 57'; Simão 80', 85'	Report		Stadium: Estádio Algarve; Attendance: 25,300; Referee: Dick van Egmond (Netherlands)

7 September 2005 2006 FIFA World Cup qualification	Liechtenstein	3–0	Luxembourg	Vaduz, Liechtenstein
19:30 CEST	Frick 38'; Fischer 77'; Beck 92'	Report		Stadium: Rheinpark Stadion; Attendance: 2,300; Referee: Damir Skomina (Slovenia)

8 October 2005 2006 FIFA World Cup qualification	Russia	5–1	Luxembourg	Moscow, Russia
19:00 CEST	Izmailov 7'; Kerzhakov 18'; Pavlyuchenko 65'; Kirichenko 74', 90+3'	Report	Reiter 52' (pen.)	Stadium: Lokomotiv Stadium; Attendance: 20,000; Referee: Alexandru Tudor (Romania)

12 October 2005 2006 FIFA World Cup qualification	Luxembourg	0–2	Estonia	Luxembourg City, Luxembourg
20:15 CEST		Report	Oper 7', 78'	Stadium: Stade Josy Barthel; Attendance: 2,010; Referee: Selçuk Dereli (Turkey)

16 November 2005 Friendly	Luxembourg	0–1	Canada	Hesperange, Luxembourg
20:00 CET		Report; Report	Hume 69'	Stadium: Stade Alphonse Theis; Attendance: 811; Referee: Paulo Manuel Gomes Costa (Portugal)

=== 2006 ===
1 March 2006 Friendly	Luxembourg	0–2	Belgium	Luxembourg City, Luxembourg
20:15 CET		Report	Vandenbergh 43'; Pieroni 62'	Stadium: Stade Josy Barthel; Attendance: 1,500; Referee: Thomas Einwaller (Austria)

27 May 2006 Friendly	Germany	7–0	Luxembourg	Freiburg, Germany
17:00 CEST	Klose 5', 59'; Frings 19' (pen.); Podolski 36', 65' (pen.); Neuville 90', 90'	Report		Stadium: badenova-Stadion; Attendance: 23,000; Referee: René Rogalla (Switzerland)

3 June 2006 Friendly	Luxembourg	0–3	Portugal	Metz, France
20:00 CEST		Report	Simão 46', 72' (pen.); Figo 85'	Stadium: Stade Saint-Symphorien; Attendance: 19,159; Referee: Laurent Duhamel (France)

8 June 2006 Friendly	Luxembourg	0–3	Ukraine	Luxembourg City, Luxembourg
20:30 CEST		Report	Voronin 55'; Shevchenko 83'; Kalynychenko 84'	Stadium: Stade Josy Barthel; Attendance: 3,766; Referee: Peter Vervecken (Belgium)

16 August 2006 Friendly	Luxembourg	0–1	Turkey	Luxembourg City, Luxembourg
20:00 CEST		Report	Tekke 26'	Stadium: Stade Josy Barthel; Attendance: 3,353; Referee: Michael Weiner (Germany)

2 September 2006 UEFA Euro 2008 qualifying	Luxembourg	0–1	Netherlands	Luxembourg City, Luxembourg
20:30 CEST		Report	Mathijsen 26'	Stadium: Stade Josy Barthel; Attendance: 8,055; Referee: João Ferreira (Portugal)

6 September 2006 Friendly	Luxembourg	0–0	Latvia	Hesperange, Luxembourg
20:00 CEST		Report		Stadium: Stade Alphonse Theis; Attendance: 1,755; Referee: Emil Božinovski (Macedonia)

7 October 2006 UEFA Euro 2008 qualifying	Slovenia	2–0	Luxembourg	Celje, Slovenia
20:45 CEST	Novaković 30'; Koren 44'	Report		Stadium: Arena Petrol; Attendance: 3,800; Referee: Panicos Kailis (Cyprus)

11 October 2006 UEFA Euro 2008 qualifying	Luxembourg	0–1	Bulgaria	Luxembourg City, Luxembourg
20:15 CEST		Report	Tunchev 26'	Stadium: Stade Josy Barthel; Attendance: 3,156; Referee: Novo Panić (Bosnia and Herzegovina)

15 November 2006 Friendly	Luxembourg	0–0	Togo	Luxembourg City, Luxembourg
20:00 CET		Report		Stadium: Stade Josy Barthel; Attendance: 1,417; Referee: Ceri Richards (Wales)

=== 2007 ===
7 February 2007 Friendly	Luxembourg	2–1	Gambia	Hesperange, Luxembourg
19:00 CET	Joachim 65'; Sagramola 83'	Report; Report	Jarju 15'	Stadium: Stade Alphonse Theis; Attendance: 520; Referee: Claudio Circhetta (Switzerland)

24 March 2007 UEFA Euro 2008 qualifying	Luxembourg	1–2	Belarus	Luxembourg City, Luxembourg
17:00 CET	Sagramola 68'	Report	Kalachev 25'; Kutuzov 54'	Stadium: Stade Josy Barthel; Attendance: 2,021; Referee: Mark Whitby (Wales)

28 March 2007 UEFA Euro 2008 qualifying	Romania	3–0	Luxembourg	Piatra Neamţ, Romania
17:30 CEST	Mutu 26'; Contra 56'; Marica 90'	Report		Stadium: Ceahlăul Stadium; Attendance: 9,120; Referee: Romans Lajuks (Latvia)

2 June 2007 UEFA Euro 2008 qualifying	Albania	2–0	Luxembourg	Tirana, Albania
20:30 CEST	Kapllani 38'; Haxhi 57'	Report		Stadium: Qemal Stafa; Attendance: 3,000; Referee: Lasha Silagava (Georgia)

6 June 2007 UEFA Euro 2008 qualifying	Luxembourg	0–3	Albania	Luxembourg City, Luxembourg
20:15 CEST		Report	Skela 25'; Kapllani 36', 72'	Stadium: Stade Josy Barthel; Attendance: 4,325; Referee: Paulius Malzinskas (Lithuania)

22 August 2007 Friendly	Luxembourg	0–0	Georgia	Luxembourg City, Luxembourg
20:00 CEST		Report		Stadium: Stade Josy Barthel; Attendance: 1,123; Referee: Stephen Weatherall (Northern Ireland)

8 September 2007 UEFA Euro 2008 qualifying	Luxembourg	0–3	Slovenia	Luxembourg City, Luxembourg
17:00 CEST		Report	Lavrič 7', 47'; Novaković 37'	Stadium: Stade Josy Barthel; Attendance: 2,012; Referee: Sergiy Berezka (Ukraine)

12 September 2007 UEFA Euro 2008 qualifying	Bulgaria	3–0	Luxembourg	Sofia, Bulgaria
19:30 CEST	Berbatov 27', 28'; Petrov 54' (pen.)	Report		Stadium: Vasil Levski National Stadium; Attendance: 4,674; Referee: Bülent Demirlek (Turkey)

13 October 2007 UEFA Euro 2008 qualifying	Belarus	0–1	Luxembourg	Gomel, Belarus
17:00 CEST		Report	Leweck 90+5'	Stadium: Central Stadion; Attendance: 13,500; Referee: Michael Svendsen (Denmark)

17 October 2007 UEFA Euro 2008 qualifying	Luxembourg	0–2	Romania	Luxembourg City, Luxembourg
20:15 CEST		Report	F. Petre 42'; Marica 61'	Stadium: Stade Josy Barthel; Attendance: 3,584; Referee: Felix Brych (Germany)

17 November 2007 UEFA Euro 2008 qualifying	Netherlands	1–0	Luxembourg	Rotterdam, Netherlands
20:30 CET	Koevermans 43'	Report		Stadium: Feijenoord Stadion; Attendance: 45,000; Referee: Martin Hansson (Sweden)

=== 2008 ===
30 January 2008 Friendly	Saudi Arabia	2–1	Luxembourg	Riyadh, Saudi Arabia
16:00 CET	Otaif 48' (pen.); Al-Qahtani 68'	Report; Report	Peters 88' (pen.)	Stadium: King Fahd International Stadium; Attendance: 2,000; Referee: Mamdouh Al Mirdasi (Saudi Arabia)

26 March 2008 Friendly	Luxembourg	0–2	Wales	Luxembourg City, Luxembourg
20:15 CET		Report	Eastwood 38', 48'	Stadium: Stade Josy Barthel; Attendance: 1,879; Referee: Björn Kuipers (Netherlands)

27 May 2008 Friendly	Luxembourg	1–1	Cape Verde	Luxembourg City, Luxembourg
19:00 CEST	Leweck 77'	Report; Report	Borges 83'	Stadium: Stade Josy Barthel; Attendance: 2,051; Referee: Pavle Radovanović (Montenegro)

20 August 2008 Friendly	Luxembourg	1–4	Macedonia	Luxembourg City, Luxembourg
20:15 CEST	Kitenge 73'	Report	Pandev 6', 45'; Grozdanoski 33'; Naumoski 49'	Stadium: Stade Josy Barthel; Attendance: 885; Referee: Bernhard Brugger (Austria)

6 September 2008 2010 FIFA World Cup qualification	Luxembourg	0–3	Greece	Luxembourg City, Luxembourg
20:15 CEST		Report	Torosidis 36'; Gekas 45+1'; Charisteas 76' (pen.)	Stadium: Stade Josy Barthel; Attendance: 4,596; Referee: Anders Hermansen (Denmark)

10 September 2008 2010 FIFA World Cup qualification	Switzerland	1–2	Luxembourg	Zürich, Switzerland
20:30 CEST	Nkufo 43'	Report	Strasser 27'; Leweck 87'	Stadium: Letzigrund; Attendance: 20,500; Referee: Dejan Filipovic (Serbia)

11 October 2008 2010 FIFA World Cup qualification	Luxembourg	1–3	Israel	Luxembourg City, Luxembourg
20:15 CEST	Peters 14'	Report	Benayoun 2' (pen.); Golan 54'; Tuama 81'	Stadium: Stade Josy Barthel; Attendance: 3,562; Referee: Igor Egorov (Russia)

15 October 2008 2010 FIFA World Cup qualification	Luxembourg	0–0	Moldova	Luxembourg City, Luxembourg
18:00 CEST		Report		Stadium: Stade Josy Barthel; Attendance: 2,157; Referee: Marcin Borski (Poland)

19 November 2008 Friendly	Luxembourg	1–1	Belgium	Luxembourg City, Luxembourg
20:30 CET	Mutsch 46'	Report	Mirallas 22'	Stadium: Stade Josy Barthel; Attendance: 4,172; Referee: Mike Riley (England)

=== 2009 ===
28 March 2009 2010 FIFA World Cup qualification	Luxembourg	0–4	Latvia	Luxembourg City, Luxembourg
17:00 CET		Report	Karlsons 25'; Cauņa 48'; Višņakovs 71'; Perepļotkins 86'	Stadium: Stade Josy Barthel; Attendance: 2,516; Referee: Mark Whitby (Wales)

1 April 2009 2010 FIFA World Cup qualification	Latvia	2–0	Luxembourg	Riga, Latvia
17:30 CEST	Žigajevs 44'; Verpakovskis 76'	Report		Stadium: Skonto Stadions; Attendance: 6,700; Referee: Fırat Aydınus (Turkey)

12 August 2009 Friendly	Luxembourg	0–1	Lithuania	Luxembourg City, Luxembourg
20:00 CEST		Report	Danilevičius 40'	Stadium: Stade Josy Barthel; Attendance: 1,455; Referee: Alan Black (Northern Ireland)

5 September 2009 2010 FIFA World Cup qualification	Moldova	0–0	Luxembourg	Chişinău, Moldova
18:00 CEST		Report		Stadium: Zimbru Stadium; Attendance: 7,820; Referee: Gediminas Mazeika (Lithuania)

9 September 2009 2010 FIFA World Cup qualification	Israel	7–0	Luxembourg	Ramat Gan, Israel
20:00 CEST	Barda 9', 21', 43'; Baruchyan 15'; Golan 58'; Sahar 62', 84'	Report		Stadium: Ramat Gan Stadium; Attendance: 7,038; Referee: Michael Svendsen (Denmark)

10 October 2009 2010 FIFA World Cup qualification	Luxembourg	0–3	Switzerland	Luxembourg City, Luxembourg
17:45 CEST		Report	Senderos 6', 8'; Huggel 22'	Stadium: Stade Josy Barthel; Attendance: 8,031; Referee: Eduardo Iturralde González (Spain)

14 October 2009 2010 FIFA World Cup qualification	Greece	2–1	Luxembourg	Athens, Greece
20:00 CEST	Torosidis 30'; Gekas 33'	Report	Papadopoulos 90' (o.g.)	Stadium: Olympic Stadium; Attendance: 13,932; Referee: Darko Čeferin (Slovenia)

14 November 2009 Friendly	Luxembourg	1–1	Iceland	Luxembourg City, Luxembourg
18:00 CET	Kintziger 75'	Report	Jóhannsson 63'	Stadium: Stade Josy Barthel; Attendance: 913; Referee: Pol van Boekel (Netherlands)

== 2010s ==
=== 2010 ===
3 March 2010 Friendly	Luxembourg	1–2	Azerbaijan	Luxembourg City, Luxembourg
20:00 CET	Strasser 34'	Report	Guliyev 24'; Mammadov 37'	Stadium: Stade Josy Barthel; Attendance: 847; Referee: Petteri Kari (Finland)

4 June 2010 Friendly	Luxembourg	0–0	Faroe Islands	Hesperange, Luxembourg
19:00 CEST		Report		Stadium: Stade Alphonse Theis; Attendance: 713; Referee: Carlo Bertolini (Switzerland)

11 August 2010 Friendly	Wales	5–1	Luxembourg	Llanelli, Wales
20:45 CEST	Cotterill 35'; Ledley 48' (pen.); King 35'; Williams 78'; Bellamy 82'	Report	Kitenge 44'	Stadium: Parc y Scarlets; Attendance: 4,904; Referee: Mattias Gestranius (Finland)

3 September 2010 UEFA Euro 2012 qualifying	Luxembourg	0–3	Bosnia and Herzegovina	Luxembourg City, Luxembourg
20:15 CEST		Report	Ibričić 6'; Pjanić 12'; Džeko 16'	Stadium: Stade Josy Barthel; Attendance: 7,327; Referee: Veaceslav Banari (Moldova)

7 September 2010 UEFA Euro 2012 qualifying	Albania	1–0	Luxembourg	Tirana, Albania
20:15 CEST	Salihi 37'	Report		Stadium: Qemal Stafa; Attendance: 10,000; Referee: Richard Trutz (Slovakia)

8 October 2010 UEFA Euro 2012 qualifying	Luxembourg	0–0	Belarus	Luxembourg City, Luxembourg
20:15 CEST		Report		Stadium: Stade Josy Barthel; Attendance: 1,857; Referee: Aleksandar Stavrev (Macedonia)

12 October 2010 UEFA Euro 2012 qualifying	France	2–0	Luxembourg	Metz, France
21:00 CEST	Benzema 22'; Gourcuff 76'	Report		Stadium: Stade Saint-Symphorien; Attendance: 24,710; Referee: Matej Jug (Slovenia)

17 November 2010 Friendly	Luxembourg	0–0	Algeria	Luxembourg City, Luxembourg
20:15 CET		Report		Stadium: Stade Josy Barthel; Attendance: 7,033; Referee: Peter Sippel (Germany)

=== 2011 ===
9 February 2011 Friendly	Luxembourg	2–1	Slovakia	Luxembourg City, Luxembourg
20:15 CET	da Mota 61', 81'	Report	Jendrišek 56'	Stadium: Stade Josy Barthel; Attendance: 862; Referee: Olivier Thual (France)

25 March 2011 UEFA Euro 2012 qualifying	Luxembourg	0–2	France	Luxembourg City, Luxembourg
21:00 CET		Report	Mexès 28'; Gourcuff 72'	Stadium: Stade Josy Barthel; Attendance: 8,500; Referee: Tom Harald Hagen (Norway)

29 March 2011 UEFA Euro 2012 qualifying	Romania	3–1	Luxembourg	Piatra Neamţ, Romania
18:45 CEST	Mutu 24', 68'; Zicu 78'	Report	Gerson 22'	Stadium: Ceahlăul Stadium; Attendance: 13,500; Referee: Hüseyin Göçek (Turkey)

3 June 2011 Friendly	Luxembourg	0–1	Hungary	Luxembourg City, Luxembourg
20:15 CEST		Report	Szabics 53'	Stadium: Stade Josy Barthel; Attendance: 1,213; Referee: Þorvaldur Árnason (Iceland)

7 June 2011 UEFA Euro 2012 qualifying	Belarus	2–0	Luxembourg	Minsk, Belarus
19:00 CEST	Kornilenko 48' (pen.); Putsila 73'	Report		Stadium: Dinamo Stadium; Attendance: 9,500; Referee: Anar Salmanov (Azerbaijan)

10 August 2011 Friendly	Portugal	5–0	Luxembourg	Loulé, Portugal
22:00 CEST	Postiga 26'; Ronaldo 44'; Coentrão 47'; Almeida 59', 73'	Report		Stadium: Estádio Algarve; Attendance: 21,283; Referee: Antonio Mateu Lahoz (Spain)

2 September 2011 UEFA Euro 2012 qualifying	Luxembourg	0–2	Romania	Luxembourg City, Luxembourg
19:30 CEST		Report	Torje 34', 45'	Stadium: Stade Josy Barthel; Attendance: 2,812; Referee: Sergei Karasev (Russia)

6 September 2011 UEFA Euro 2012 qualifying	Luxembourg	2–1	Albania	Luxembourg City, Luxembourg
20:15 CEST	Bettmer 27'; Joachim 78'	Report	Bogdani 64'	Stadium: Stade Josy Barthel; Attendance: 2,132; Referee: Petteri Kari (Finland)

7 October 2011 UEFA Euro 2012 qualifying	Bosnia and Herzegovina	5–0	Luxembourg	Zenica, Bosnia and Herzegovina
20:00 CEST	Džeko 12'; Misimović 15', 22' (pen.); Pjanić 36'; Medunjanin 51'	Report		Stadium: Bilino Polje; Attendance: 12,000; Referee: Simon Lee Evans (Wales)

15 November 2011 Friendly	Luxembourg	0–1	Switzerland	Luxembourg City, Luxembourg
20:15 CET		Report	Zhaka 9'	Stadium: Stade Josy Barthel; Attendance: 852; Referee: Sébastien Delferière (Belgium)

=== 2012 ===
29 February 2012 Friendly	Luxembourg	2–1	Macedonia	Luxembourg City, Luxembourg
19:00 CET	Deville 55', 90'	Report	Hasani 24'	Stadium: Stade Josy Barthel; Attendance: 787; Referee: Raymond Crangle (Northern Ireland)

2 June 2012 Friendly	Luxembourg	0–2	Malta	Luxembourg City, Luxembourg
17:00 CEST		Report	Mifsud 10', 80'	Stadium: Stade Josy Barthel; Attendance: 1,054; Referee: Markus Hameter (Austria)

15 August 2012 Friendly	Luxembourg	1–2	Georgia	Differdange, Luxembourg
20:00 CEST	Joachim 84' (pen.)	Report	Mchedlidze 2'; Amisulashvili 32'	Stadium: Stade Municipal Differdange; Attendance: 1,215; Referee: Clément Turpin (France)

7 September 2012 2014 FIFA World Cup qualification	Luxembourg	1–2	Portugal	Luxembourg City, Luxembourg
20:45 CEST	da Mota 13'	Report	Ronaldo 28'; Postiga 54'	Stadium: Stade Josy Barthel; Attendance: 8,125; Referee: Kristo Tohver (Estonia

11 September 2012 2014 FIFA World Cup qualification	Northern Ireland	1–1	Luxembourg	Belfast, Northern Ireland
20:45 CEST	Shiels 14'	Report	da Mota 86'	Stadium: Windsor Park; Attendance: 10,674; Referee: Vlado Glodjović (Serbia)

12 October 2012 2014 FIFA World Cup qualification	Luxembourg	0–6	Israel	Luxembourg City, Luxembourg
21:00 CEST		Report	Radi 4'; Ben Basat 12'; Hemed 27', 74', 90+1'; Melikson 61'	Stadium: Stade Josy Barthel; Attendance: 2,631; Referee: Leontios Trattou (Cyprus)

16 October 2012 2014 FIFA World Cup qualification	Israel	3–0	Luxembourg	Ramat Gan, Israel
18:00 CEST	Hemed 13', 48'; Ben Basat 35'	Report		Stadium: Ramat Gan Stadium; Attendance: 20,400; Referee: Harald Lechner (Austria)

14 November 2012 Friendly	Luxembourg	1–2	Scotland	Luxembourg City, Luxembourg
20:15 CET	Gerson 47'	Report	Rhodes 11', 23'	Stadium: Stade Josy Barthel; Attendance: 2,521; Referee: Cyril Zimmermann (Switzerland)

=== 2013 ===
5 February 2013 Friendly	Armenia	1–1	Luxembourg	Valence, France
19:45 CET	Manucharyan 43'	Report	Mutsch 15'	Stadium: Stade Georges Pompidou; Attendance: 1,500; Referee: Rainville Nicolas (France)

22 March 2013 2014 FIFA World Cup qualification	Luxembourg	0–0	Azerbaijan	Luxembourg City, Luxembourg
20:15 CET		Report		Stadium: Stade Josy Barthel; Attendance: 1,324; Referee: Padraigh Sutton (Republic of Ireland)

26 March 2013 Friendly	Luxembourg	0–3	Finland	Luxembourg City, Luxembourg
19:30 CET		Report	Ring 43'; Forssell 51' (pen.); Toivio 90'	Stadium: Stade Josy Barthel; Attendance: 856; Referee: Jonathan Lardot (Belgium)

7 June 2013 2014 FIFA World Cup qualification	Azerbaijan	1–1	Luxembourg	Baku, Azerbaijan
18:00 CEST	Abishov 71'	Report	Bensi 80'	Stadium: Eighth Kilometer District Stadium; Attendance: 9,258; Referee: Mihaly Fabian (Hungary)

14 August 2013 Friendly	Luxembourg	2–1	Lithuania	Luxembourg City, Luxembourg
19:30 CEST	Joachim 49'; Bensi 80'	Report	Matulevičius 15'	Stadium: Stade Josy Barthel; Attendance: 958; Referee: Arnold Hunter (Northern Ireland)

6 September 2013 2014 FIFA World Cup qualification	Russia	4–1	Luxembourg	Kazan, Russia
17:30 CEST	Kokorin 1', 36'; Kerzhakov 59'; Samedov 90+3'	Report	Joachim 90'	Stadium: Central Stadium; Attendance: 18,525; Referee: Bobby Madden (Scotland)

10 September 2013 2014 FIFA World Cup qualification	Luxembourg	3–2	Northern Ireland	Luxembourg City, Luxembourg
20:15 CEST	Joachim 45+1'; Bensi 78'; Jänisch 87'	Report	Paterson 14'; McAuley 82'	Stadium: Stade Josy Barthel; Attendance: 4,114; Referee: Robert Malek (Poland)

11 October 2013 2014 FIFA World Cup qualification	Luxembourg	0–4	Russia	Luxembourg City, Luxembourg
20:30 CEST		Report	Samedov 9'; Fayzulin 39'; Glushakov 45+2'; Kerzhakov 73'	Stadium: Stade Josy Barthel; Attendance: 5,354; Referee: Stephan Studer (Switzerland)

15 October 2013 2014 FIFA World Cup qualification	Portugal	3–0	Luxembourg	Coimbra, Portugal
19:00 CEST	Varela 30'; Nani 36'; Postiga 78'	Report		Stadium: Estádio Cidade de Coimbra; Attendance: 18,955; Referee: Bülent Yıldırım (Turkey)

17 November 2013 Friendly	Luxembourg	1–4	Montenegro	Luxembourg City, Luxembourg
19:00 CET	Deville 67'	Report	Baša 38' (pen.); Zverotić 58'; Jovanović 70'; Ćetković 82'	Stadium: Stade Josy Barthel; Attendance: 1,775; Referee: Tobias Welz (Germany)

=== 2014 ===
5 March 2014 Friendly	Luxembourg	0–0	Cape Verde	Luxembourg City, Luxembourg
19:30 CET		Report		Stadium: Stade Josy Barthel; Attendance: 3,885; Referee: Bart Vertenten (Belgium)

26 May 2014 Friendly	Belgium	5–1	Luxembourg	Genk, Belgium
20:45 CEST	Lukaku 3', 23', 54'; Chadli 71'; De Bruyne 90+1' (pen.)	Report	Joachim 13'	Stadium: Cristal Arena; Attendance: 25,956; Referee: Tom Harald Hagen (Norway)

4 June 2014 Friendly	Italy	1–1	Luxembourg	Perugia, Italy
20:45 CEST	Marchisio 9'	Report	Chanot 85'	Stadium: Stadio Renato Curi; Attendance: 28,000; Referee: Damir Skomina (Slovenia)

8 September 2014 UEFA Euro 2016 qualifying	Luxembourg	1–1	Belarus	Luxembourg City, Luxembourg
20:45 CEST	Gerson 42'	Report	Drahun 78'	Stadium: Stade Josy Barthel; Attendance: 3,265; Referee: Gediminas Mažeika (Lithuania)

9 October 2014 UEFA Euro 2016 qualifying	Macedonia	3–2	Luxembourg	Skopje, Macedonia
20:45 CEST	Trajkovski 20'; Jahović 66' (pen.); Abdurahimi 90+2'	Report	Bensi 39'; Turpel 44'	Stadium: Philip II Arena; Attendance: 11,500; Referee: Paolo Mazzoleni (Italy)

12 October 2014 UEFA Euro 2016 qualifying	Luxembourg	0–4	Spain	Luxembourg City, Luxembourg
20:45 CEST		Report	Silva 27'; Alcácer 42'; Costa 69'; Bernat 88'	Stadium: Stade Josy Barthel; Attendance: 8,125; Referee: Paweł Gil (Poland)

15 November 2014 UEFA Euro 2016 qualifying	Luxembourg	0–3	Ukraine	Luxembourg City, Luxembourg
18:00 CET		Report	Yarmolenko 33', 53', 56'	Stadium: Stade Josy Barthel; Attendance: 4,379; Referee: Kristinn Jakobsson (Iceland)

=== 2015 ===
27 March 2015 UEFA Euro 2016 qualifying	Slovakia	3–0	Luxembourg	Žilina, Slovakia
20:45 CET	Nemec 10'; Weiss 21'; Pekarík 40'	Report		Stadium: Štadión pod Dubňom; Attendance: 9,524; Referee: Stephan Studer (Switzerland)

31 March 2015 Friendly	Luxembourg	1–2	Turkey	Luxembourg City, Luxembourg
20:15 CET	Mutsch 30'	Report	Erdinç 4'; Çalhanoğlu 87'	Stadium: Stade Josy Barthel; Attendance: 3,653; Referee: Sant Alan (Malta)

9 June 2015 Friendly	Luxembourg	0–0	Moldova	Luxembourg City, Luxembourg
19:00 CEST		Report		Stadium: Stade Josy Barthel; Attendance: 1,122; Referee: Daniel Siebert (Germany)

14 June 2015 UEFA Euro 2016 qualifying	Ukraine	3–0	Luxembourg	Lviv, Ukraine
18:00 CEST	Kravets 49'; Harmash 57'; Konoplyanka 86'	Report		Stadium: Arena Lviv; Attendance: 21,635; Referee: Arnold Hunter (Northern Ireland)

5 September 2015 UEFA Euro 2016 qualifying	Luxembourg	1–0	Macedonia	Luxembourg City, Luxembourg
18:00 CEST	Thill 90+2'	Report		Stadium: Stade Josy Barthel; Attendance: 1,657; Referee: Simon Lee Evans (Wales)

8 September 2015 UEFA Euro 2016 qualifying	Belarus	2–0	Luxembourg	Barysaw, Belarus
20:45 CEST	Gordeichuk 34', 62'	Report		Stadium: Borisov Arena; Attendance: 3,482; Referee: Slavko Vinčić (Slovenia)

9 October 2015 UEFA Euro 2016 qualifying	Spain	4–0	Luxembourg	Logroño, Spain
20:45 CEST	Cazorla 42', 85'; Alcácer 67', 80'	Report		Stadium: Las Gaunas; Attendance: 14,472; Referee: Sébastien Delferière (Belgium)

12 October 2015 UEFA Euro 2016 qualifying	Luxembourg	2–4	Slovakia	Luxembourg City, Luxembourg
20:45 CEST	Mutsch 61'; Gerson 65' (pen.)	Report	Hamšík 24', 90+1'; Nemec 29'; Mak 30'	Stadium: Stade Josy Barthel; Attendance: 2,512; Referee: Oliver Drachta (Austria)

13 November 2015 Friendly	Luxembourg	1–0	Greece	Differdange, Luxembourg
19:30 CET	Joachim 90+1'	Report		Stadium: Stade Municipal Differdange; Attendance: 1,894; Referee: Tim Marshal (Northern Ireland)

17 November 2015 Friendly	Luxembourg	0–2	Portugal	Luxembourg City, Luxembourg
20:30 CET		Report	André 30'; Nani 87'	Stadium: Stade Josy Barthel; Attendance: 8,031; Referee: Tony Chapron (France)

=== 2016 ===
25 March 2016 Friendly	Luxembourg	0–3	Bosnia and Herzegovina	Luxembourg City, Luxembourg
20:15 CET		Report	Chanot 73' (o.g.); Đurić 75'; Pjanić 90+2'	Stadium: Stade Josy Barthel; Attendance: 3,731; Referee: Jonathan Lardot (Belgium)

29 March 2016 Friendly	Luxembourg	0–2	Albania	Luxembourg City, Luxembourg
20:15 CET		Report	Sadiku 63'; Cikalleshi 75'	Stadium: Stade Josy Barthel; Attendance: 3,123; Referee: Robert Schörgenhofer (Austria)

31 May 2016 Friendly	Luxembourg	1–3	Nigeria	Luxembourg City, Luxembourg
19:00 CEST	Thill 90'	EU Football; Soccerway	Ideye 36'; Iheanacho 69'; Ighalo 90+3'	Stadium: Stade Josy Barthel; Attendance: 1,866; Referee: Martin Atkinson (England)

2 September 2016 Friendly	Latvia	3–1	Luxembourg	Riga, Latvia
19:30 CEST	Ikaunieks 3'; Zjuzins 47', 51'	Report	da Mota 46'	Stadium: Skonto Stadium; Attendance: 4,632; Referee: Andrew Davey (Northern Ireland)

6 September 2016 2018 FIFA World Cup qualification	Bulgaria	4–3	Luxembourg	Sofia, Bulgaria
20:45 CEST	Rangelov 16'; Marcelinho 65'; I. Popov 79'; Tonev 90+2'	Report	Joachim 60', 62'; Bohnert 90+1'	Stadium: Vasil Levski National Stadium; Attendance: 4,202; Referee: Gediminas Mažeika (Lithuania)

7 October 2016 2018 FIFA World Cup qualification	Luxembourg	0–1	Sweden	Luxembourg City, Luxembourg
20:45 CEST		Report	Lustig 58'	Stadium: Stade Josy Barthel; Attendance: 5,057; Referee: Ivan Bebek (Croatia)

10 October 2016 2018 FIFA World Cup qualification	Belarus	1–1	Luxembourg	Barysaw, Belarus
20:45 CEST	Savitski 80'	Report	Joachim 85'	Stadium: Borisov Arena; Attendance: 9,011; Referee: Tobias Welz (Germany)

13 November 2016 2018 FIFA World Cup qualification	Luxembourg	1–3	Netherlands	Luxembourg City, Luxembourg
18:00 CET	Chanot 44' (pen.)	Report	Robben 36'; Depay 58', 84'	Stadium: Stade Josy Barthel; Attendance: 8,000; Referee: Anthony Taylor (England)

=== 2017 ===
25 March 2017 2018 FIFA World Cup qualification	Luxembourg	1–3	France	Luxembourg City, Luxembourg
20:45 CET	Joachim 34' (pen.)	Report	Giroud 28', 77'; Griezmann 37' (pen.)	Stadium: Stade Josy Barthel; Attendance: 8,000; Referee: Andris Treimanis (Latvia)

28 March 2017 Friendly	Luxembourg	0–2	Cape Verde	Hesperange, Luxembourg
20:00 CET		Soccerway; EU Football	Gegé 8'; Tavares 22'	Stadium: Stade Alphonse Theis; Attendance: 2,096; Referee: Paul McLaughlin (Ireland)

4 June 2017 Friendly	Luxembourg	2–1	Albania	Luxembourg City, Luxembourg
18:00 CEST	Turpel 63'; Malget 75'	Soccerway; EU Football	Roshi 53'	Stadium: Stade Josy Barthel; Attendance: 3,052; Referee: Tim Marshall (Northern Ireland)

9 June 2017 2018 FIFA World Cup qualification	Netherlands	5–0	Luxembourg	Rotterdam, Netherlands
20:45 CEST	Robben 21'; Sneijder 34'; Wijnaldum 62'; Promes 70'; Janssen 84' (pen.)	Report		Stadium: De Kuip; Attendance: 41,300; Referee: Bartosz Frankowski (Poland)

31 August 2017 2018 FIFA World Cup qualification	Luxembourg	1–0	Belarus	Luxembourg City, Luxembourg
20:45 CEST	Da Mota 60'	Report		Stadium: Stade Josy Barthel; Attendance: 2,752; Referee: Clayton Pisani (Malta)

3 September 2017 2018 FIFA World Cup qualification	France	0–0	Luxembourg	Toulouse, France
20:45 CEST		Report		Stadium: Stadium Municipal; Attendance: 31,177; Referee: Aleksandar Stavrev (Macedonia)

7 October 2017 2018 FIFA World Cup qualification	Sweden	8–0	Luxembourg	Solna, Sweden
18:00 CEST	Granqvist 10' (pen.), 67' (pen.); Berg 18', 37', 53', 71'; Lustig 60'; Toivonen 76'	Report		Stadium: Friends Arena; Attendance: 50,022; Referee: Hüseyin Göçek (Turkey)

10 October 2017 2018 FIFA World Cup qualification	Luxembourg	1–1	Bulgaria	Luxembourg City, Luxembourg
20:45 CEST	O. Thill 3'	Report	Chochev 68'	Stadium: Stade Josy Barthel; Attendance: 2,936; Referee: István Vad (Hungary)

10 November 2017 Friendly	Luxembourg	2–1	Hungary	Luxembourg City, Luxembourg
19:30 CET	Joachim 15'; Da Graça 84'	Report	Nikolić 18'	Stadium: Stade Josy Barthel; Attendance: 1,873; Referee: Sébastien Delferière (Belgium)

=== 2018 ===
22 March 2018 Friendly	Malta	0–1	Luxembourg	Ta' Qali, Malta
18:00 CET		Report	Da Mota 90+3'	Stadium: National Stadium; Attendance: 1,000; Referee: Enea Jorgji (Albania)

27 March 2018 Friendly	Luxembourg	0–4	Austria	Luxembourg City, Luxembourg
20:30 CEST		Report	Arnautović 4'; Grillitsch 39'; Gregoritsch 59'; Schaub 84'	Stadium: Stade Josy Barthel; Attendance: 2,123; Referee: Mattias Gestranius (Finland)

31 May 2018 Friendly	Luxembourg	0–0	Senegal	Luxembourg City, Luxembourg
20:00 CEST		Report		Stadium: Stade Josy Barthel; Attendance: 3,816; Referee: Xavier Estrada Fernández (Spain)

5 June 2018 Friendly	Luxembourg	1–0	Georgia	Luxembourg City, Luxembourg
20:00 CEST	Joachim 70'	Report		Stadium: Stade Josy Barthel; Attendance: 1,786; Referee: Iwan Griffith (Wales)

8 September 2018 2018–19 Nations League	Luxembourg	4–0	Moldova	Luxembourg City, Luxembourg
20:45 CEST	Malget 34'; Thill 60'; Sinani 75'; Martins 83'	Report		Stadium: Stade Josy Barthel; Attendance: 2,956; Referee: Rob Harvey (Ireland)

11 September 2018 2018–19 Nations League	San Marino	0–3	Luxembourg	Serravalle, San Marino
20:45 CEST		Report	Chanot 9'; Joachim 45+1'; Sinani 52'	Stadium: San Marino Stadium; Attendance: 794; Referee: Filip Glova (Slovakia)

12 October 2018 2018–19 Nations League	Belarus	1–0	Luxembourg	Minsk, Belarus
20:45 CEST	Saroka 43'	Report		Stadium: Dinamo Stadium; Attendance: 14,122; Referee: Ali Palabıyık (Turkey)

15 October 2018 2018–19 Nations League	Luxembourg	3–0	San Marino	Luxembourg City, Luxembourg
20:45 CEST	Turpel 4'; Sinani 65'; V. Thill 73'	Report		Stadium: Stade Josy Barthel; Attendance: 2,876; Referee: Aleksandrs Golubevs (Latvia)

15 November 2018 2018–19 Nations League	Luxembourg	0–2	Belarus	Luxembourg City, Luxembourg
20:45 CET		Report	Drahun 37', 54'	Stadium: Stade Josy Barthel; Attendance: 4,533; Referee: Serdar Gözübüyük (Netherlands)

18 November 2018 2018–19 Nations League	Moldova	1–1	Luxembourg	Chișinău, Moldova
18:00 CET	Gînsari 58' (pen.)	Report	Bensi 70'	Stadium: Zimbru Stadium; Attendance: 4,642; Referee: Adrien Jaccottet (Switzerland)

=== 2019 ===
22 March 2019 UEFA Euro 2020 qualifying	Luxembourg	2–1	Lithuania	Luxembourg City, Luxembourg
20:45 CET	Barreiro 45'; Rodrigues 55'	Report	Černych 14'	Stadium: Stade Josy Barthel; Attendance: 3,353; Referee: Roi Reinshreiber (Israel)

25 March 2019 UEFA Euro 2020 qualifying	Luxembourg	1–2	Ukraine	Luxembourg City, Luxembourg
20:45 CET	Turpel 34'	Report	Tsyhankov 40'; Rodrigues 90+3' (o.g.)	Stadium: Stade Josy Barthel; Attendance: 4,653; Referee: Mattias Gestranius (Finland)

2 June 2019 Friendly	Luxembourg	3–3	Madagascar	Luxembourg City, Luxembourg
20:00 CEST	V. Thill 2'; Selimović 90+1'; Jans 90+2'	Report	Voavy 35'; Andriatsima 37' (pen.); Andriamatsinoro 62'	Stadium: Stade Josy Barthel; Attendance: 1,831; Referee: Neil Doyle (Ireland)

7 June 2019 UEFA Euro 2020 qualifying	Lithuania	1–1	Luxembourg	Vilnius, Lithuania
20:45 CEST	Novikovas 74'	Report	Rodrigues 21'	Stadium: LFF Stadium; Attendance: 3,263; Referee: Ádám Farkas (Hungary)

10 June 2019 UEFA Euro 2020 qualifying	Ukraine	1–0	Luxembourg	Lviv, Ukraine
20:45 CEST	Yaremchuk 6'	Report		Stadium: Arena Lviv; Attendance: 34,700; Referee: Peter Kralović (Slovakia)

5 September 2019 Friendly	Northern Ireland	1–0	Luxembourg	Belfast, Northern Ireland
19:45 BST	Malget 37' (o.g.)	Report		Stadium: Windsor Park; Attendance: 14,108; Referee: Bryn Markham-Jones (Wales)

10 September 2019 UEFA Euro 2020 qualifying	Luxembourg	1–3	Serbia	Luxembourg City, Luxembourg
20:45 CEST	Turpel 66'	Report	A. Mitrović 36', 78'; Radonjić 55'	Stadium: Stade Josy Barthel; Attendance: 6,373; Referee: Davide Massa (Italy)

11 October 2019 UEFA Euro 2020 qualifying	Portugal	3–0	Luxembourg	Lisbon, Portugal
20:45 CEST	B. Silva 16'; Ronaldo 65'; Guedes 89'	Report		Stadium: Estádio José Alvalade; Attendance: 47,305; Referee: Daniel Stefański (Poland)

15 October 2019 Friendly	Denmark	4–0	Luxembourg	Aalborg, Denmark
20:00 CEST	Braithwaite 13'; Dolberg 21', 59'; Gytkjær 67'	Report		Stadium: Aalborg Portland Park; Attendance: 9,043; Referee: Bojan Pandžić (Sweden)

14 November 2019 UEFA Euro 2020 qualifying	Serbia	3–2	Luxembourg	Belgrade, Serbia
20:45 CET	A. Mitrović 11', 43'; Radonjić 70'	Report	Rodrigues 54'; Turpel 75'	Stadium: Red Star Stadium; Attendance: 1.560; Referee: Serdar Gözübüyük (Netherlands)

17 November 2019 UEFA Euro 2020 qualifying	Luxembourg	0–2	Portugal	Luxembourg City, Luxembourg
15:00 CET		Report	Fernandes 39'; Ronaldo 86'	Stadium: Stade Josy Barthel; Attendance: 8,000; Referee: Jesús Gil Manzano (Spain)
