= Aurélien Joachim =

Footballer (born 1986)

Personal information
- Date of birth: 10 August 1986 (age 40)
- Place of birth: Virton, Belgium
- Height: 1.84 m (6 ft 0 in)
- Position: Striker

Team information
- Current team: Arlon
- Number: 7

Youth career
- Rossignol
- Lorrain Arlon
- Virton
- Mouscron

Senior career*
Years	Team	Apps	(Gls)
2004–2005	Virton	32	(1)
2006	VfL Bochum II	17	(0)
2007	Alemannia Aachen II	1	(0)
2008–2011	FC Differdange 03	84	(37)
2011–2013	Dudelange	25	(19)
2012–2013	→ Willem II (loan)	25	(6)
2013–2014	RKC Waalwijk	31	(6)
2014–2015	CSKA Sofia	20	(5)
2015–2016	Burton Albion	7	(0)
2016	White Star Bruxelles	10	(8)
2016–2018	Lierse	48	(10)
2018–2020	Virton	29	(7)
2020–2022	FC Differdange 03	29	(13)
2022–2024	RUS Ethe Belmont	0	(0)
2024–	Arlon	17	(12)

International career
2005–2019	Luxembourg	80	(15)
- * Club domestic league appearances and goals as of 9 March 2025

Aurélien Joachim (born 10 August 1986) is a professional footballer who plays for Arlon as a striker. Born in Belgium, he made 80 appearances for the Luxembourg, scoring 15 goals between 2005 and 2019. He is the younger brother of former cyclist Benoît Joachim.

== Club career ==
Joachim spent his time in the youth teams of Belgian clubs Virton and Mouscron, before making his senior debut for Virton in the 2004–05 season. He then played for the reserve teams of German Bundesliga sides VfL Bochum and Alemannia Aachen before making his debut in the Luxembourg National Division in the second half of the 2007–08 season.

Joachim was transferred to F91 Dudelange in May 2011. He has been a key figure in Dudelange's Champions League run in 2012–13, scoring 4 goals over 2 legs against SP Tre Penne of San Marino, and scoring in each leg of Dudelange's famous 4–4 aggregate draw with Red Bull Salzburg, helping his side through via the away goals rule to face NK Maribor in the third qualifying round, the furthest Dudelange have ever gone in the Champions League.

On 29 August 2012, he was loaned to Willem II until the end of the season. In July 2013, he signed a two-year deal with RKC Waalwijk after he had permanently left Dudelange as a free agent.

Before the beginning of the 2014–15 season, Joachim signed with Bulgarian club CSKA Sofia. He made his official debut for the side in a Europa League qualifier against Zimbru Chișinău on 17 July 2014. He played his last match for the "redmen" in April 2015, as he had to return to Luxembourg in order to undergo a meniscus operation.

After one season with Virton, he confirmed that he had been relegated to the club's B-team because he was not a part of the club's plans. However, he was promoted back to the first team at the end of October 2019.

He returned to FC Differdange 03 in July 2020.

== International career ==
Joachim made his debut for Luxembourg in a September 2005 World Cup qualification match against Liechtenstein, at just 19 years of age. In his senior career, Joachim earned 80 caps, scoring 15 goals.

He announced his retirement from international football in July 2020.

== Career statistics ==
=== International ===
Appearances and goals by national team and year
National team	Year	Apps	Goals
Luxembourg	2005	2	0
Luxembourg	2006	10	0
Luxembourg	2007	2	1
Luxembourg	2008	7	0
Luxembourg	2009	0	0
Luxembourg	2010	3	0
Luxembourg	2011	7	1
Luxembourg	2012	7	1
Luxembourg	2013	9	3
Luxembourg	2014	3	1
Luxembourg	2015	8	1
Luxembourg	2016	6	3
Luxembourg	2017	6	2
Luxembourg	2018	8	2
Luxembourg	2019	2	0
Total		80	15

Scores and results list Luxembourg's goal tally first, score column indicates score after each Joachim goal.

List of international goals scored by Aurélien Joachim
No.	Date	Venue	Opponent	Score	Result	Competition
1	7 February 2007	Stade Alphonse Theis, Hesperange, Luxembourg	Gambia	1–1	2–1	Friendly
2	6 September 2011	Stade Josy Barthel, Luxembourg City, Luxembourg	Albania	2–1	2–1	UEFA Euro 2012 qualifying
3	15 August 2012	Stade Municipal, Differdange, Luxembourg	Georgia	1–2	1–2	Friendly
4	14 August 2013	Stade Josy Barthel, Luxembourg City, Luxembourg	Lithuania	1–1	2–1	Friendly
5	6 September 2013	Central Stadium Kazan, Russia	Russia	1–3	1–4	2014 FIFA World Cup qualification
6	10 September 2013	Stade Josy Barthel, Luxembourg City, Luxembourg	Northern Ireland	1–1	3–2	2014 FIFA World Cup qualification
7	26 May 2014	Cristal Arena, Genk, Belgium	Belgium	1–1	1–5	Friendly
8	13 November 2015	Stade Josy Barthel, Luxembourg City, Luxembourg	Greece	1–0	1–0	Friendly
9	6 September 2016	Vasil Levski National Stadium, Sofia, Bulgaria	Bulgaria	1–1	3–4	2018 FIFA World Cup qualification
10	6 September 2016	Vasil Levski National Stadium, Sofia, Bulgaria	Bulgaria	2–1	3–4	2018 FIFA World Cup qualification
11	10 October 2016	Borisov Arena, Barysaw, Belarus	Belarus	1–1	1–1	2018 FIFA World Cup qualification
12	25 March 2017	Stade Josy Barthel, Luxembourg City, Luxembourg	France	1–1	1–3	2018 FIFA World Cup qualification
13	9 November 2017	Stade Josy Barthel, Luxembourg City, Luxembourg	Hungary	1–0	2–1	Friendly
14	5 June 2018	Stade Josy Barthel, Luxembourg City, Luxembourg	Georgia	1–0	1–0	Friendly
15	11 September 2018	San Marino Stadium, Serravalle, San Marino	San Marino	2–0	3–0	2018–19 UEFA Nations League D
