= UEFA Euro 2012 qualifying Group D =

Football tournament qualifying stage

This page shows the standings and results for Group D of the UEFA Euro 2012 qualifying tournament.

== Standings ==
Pos	Team	Pld	W	D	L	GF	GA	GD	Pts	Qualification	(France)	(Bosnia and Herzegovina)	(Romania)	(Belarus)	(Albania)	(Luxembourg)
1	France	10	6	3	1	15	4	+11	21	Qualify for final tournament	—	1–1	2–0	0–1	3–0	2–0
2	Bosnia and Herzegovina	10	6	2	2	17	8	+9	20	Advance to play-offs	0–2	—	2–1	1–0	2–0	5–0
3	Romania	10	3	5	2	13	9	+4	14		0–0	3–0	—	2–2	1–1	3–1
4	Belarus	10	3	4	3	8	7	+1	13		1–1	0–2	0–0	—	2–0	2–0
5	Albania	10	2	3	5	7	14	−7	9		1–2	1–1	1–1	1–0	—	1–0
6	Luxembourg	10	1	1	8	3	21	−18	4		0–2	0–3	0–2	0–0	2–1	—

Source: UEFA
Rules for classification: Qualification tiebreakers

== Matches ==
Group D fixtures were negotiated between the participants at a meeting in Luxembourg City on 19 February 2010.

3 September 2010
21:00 UTC+3

Romania	1–1	Albania
Stancu 80'	Report	Muzaka 87'

Stadionul Ceahlăul, Piatra Neamț
Attendance: 13,400
Referee: Robert Schörgenhofer (Austria)
3 September 2010
20:15 UTC+2

Luxembourg	0–3	Bosnia and Herzegovina
	Report	Ibričić 6'; Pjanić 12'; Džeko 16'

Stade Josy Barthel, Luxembourg City
Attendance: 7,327
Referee: Veaceslav Banari (Moldova)
3 September 2010
21:00 UTC+2

France	0–1	Belarus
	Report	Kislyak 86'

Stade de France, Saint-Denis
Attendance: 76,395
Referee: William Collum (Scotland)

7 September 2010
20:30 UTC+3

Belarus	0–0	Romania
	Report

Dinamo Stadium, Minsk
Attendance: 26,354
Referee: Pavel Kralovec (Czech Republic)
7 September 2010
20:15 UTC+2

Albania	1–0	Luxembourg
Salihi 37'	Report

Qemal Stafa, Tirana
Attendance: 10,000
Referee: Richard Trutz (Slovakia)
7 September 2010
21:00 UTC+2

Bosnia and Herzegovina	0–2	France
	Report	Benzema 72'; Malouda 78'

Asim Ferhatović Hase Stadium, Sarajevo
Attendance: 28,000
Referee: Felix Brych (Germany)

8 October 2010
20:15 UTC+2

Luxembourg	0–0	Belarus
	Report

Stade Josy Barthel, Luxembourg City
Attendance: 1,857
Referee: Aleksandar Stavrev (Macedonia)
8 October 2010
20:30 UTC+2

Albania	1–1	Bosnia and Herzegovina
Duro 45+2'	Report	Ibišević 21'

Qemal Stafa, Tirana
Attendance: 14,220
Referee: Kristinn Jakobsson (Iceland)
9 October 2010
21:00 UTC+2

France	2–0	Romania
Rémy 83'; Gourcuff 90+3'	Report

Stade de France, Saint-Denis
Attendance: 79,299
Referee: Pedro Proença (Portugal)

12 October 2010
20:30 UTC+3

Belarus	2–0	Albania
Rodionov 10'; Krivets 77'	Report

Dinamo Stadium, Minsk
Attendance: 7,000
Referee: Peter Rasmussen (Denmark)
12 October 2010
21:00 UTC+2

France	2–0	Luxembourg
Benzema 22'; Gourcuff 76'	Report

Stade Saint-Symphorien, Metz
Attendance: 24,710
Referee: Matej Jug (Slovenia)

25 March 2011
21:00 UTC+1

Luxembourg	0–2	France
	Report	Mexès 28'; Gourcuff 72'

Stade Josy Barthel, Luxembourg City
Attendance: 8,052
Referee: Tom Harald Hagen (Norway)
26 March 2011
19:15 UTC+1

Bosnia and Herzegovina	2–1	Romania
Ibišević 63'; Džeko 83'	Report	Marica 29'

Bilino Polje, Zenica
Attendance: 13,000
Referee: Fernando Teixeira Vitienes (Spain)
26 March 2011
20:00 UTC+1

Albania	1–0	Belarus
Salihi 62'	Report

Qemal Stafa, Tirana
Attendance: 13,826
Referee: Markus Strömbergsson (Sweden)

29 March 2011
19:45 UTC+3

Romania	3–1	Luxembourg
Mutu 24', 68'; Zicu 78'	Report	Gerson 22'

Ceahlăul Stadium, Piatra Neamț
Attendance: 13,500
Referee: Hüseyin Göçek (Turkey)

3 June 2011
21:00 UTC+3

Romania	3–0	Bosnia and Herzegovina
Mutu 37'; Marica 41', 55'	Report

Stadionul Giulești-Valentin Stănescu, Bucharest
Attendance: 8,200
Referee: Jonas Eriksson (Sweden)
3 June 2011
21:50 UTC+3

Belarus	1–1	France
Abidal 20' (o.g.)	Report	Malouda 22'

Dinamo Stadium, Minsk
Attendance: 26,500
Referee: David Fernández Borbalán (Spain)

7 June 2011
20:00 UTC+3

Belarus	2–0	Luxembourg
Kornilenko 48' (pen.); Putsila 73'	Report

Dinamo Stadium, Minsk
Attendance: 9,500
Referee: Anar Salmanov (Azerbaijan)
7 June 2011
20:15 UTC+2

Bosnia and Herzegovina	2–0	Albania
Medunjanin 67'; Maletić 90+1'	Report

Bilino Polje, Zenica
Attendance: 9,000
Referee: Kevin Blom (Netherlands)

2 September 2011
19:30 UTC+2

Luxembourg	0–2	Romania
	Report	Torje 34', 45'

Stade Josy Barthel, Luxembourg City
Attendance: 2,812
Referee: Sergei Karasev (Russia)
2 September 2011
20:30 UTC+3

Belarus	0–2	Bosnia and Herzegovina
	Report	Salihović 21' (pen.); Medunjanin 24'

Dinamo Stadium, Minsk
Attendance: 28,500
Referee: Viktor Kassai (Hungary)
2 September 2011
21:00 UTC+2

Albania	1–2	France
Bogdani 46'	Report	Benzema 11'; M'Vila 18'

Qemal Stafa, Tirana
Attendance: 15,600
Referee: Aleksei Nikolaev (Russia)

6 September 2011
20:15 UTC+2

Bosnia and Herzegovina	1–0	Belarus
Misimović 87'	Report

Bilino Polje, Zenica
Attendance: 12,000
Referee: Martin Atkinson (England)
6 September 2011
20:15 UTC+2

Luxembourg	2–1	Albania
Bettmer 27'; Joachim 78'	Report	Bogdani 64'

Stade Josy Barthel, Luxembourg City
Attendance: 2,132
Referee: Petteri Kari (Finland)
6 September 2011
21:30 UTC+3

Romania	0–0	France
	Report

Arena Națională, Bucharest
Attendance: 49,137
Referee: Howard Webb (England)

7 October 2011
20:00 UTC+2

Bosnia and Herzegovina	5–0	Luxembourg
Džeko 12'; Misimović 15', 22' (pen.); Pjanić 36'; Medunjanin 51'	Report

Bilino Polje, Zenica
Attendance: 12,000
Referee: Simon Lee Evans (Wales)
7 October 2011
21:30 UTC+3

Romania	2–2	Belarus
Mutu 19', 51' (pen.)	Report	Kornilenko 45'; Drahun 82'

Arena Națională, Bucharest
Attendance: 29,486
Referee: Alan Kelly (Republic of Ireland)
7 October 2011
21:00 UTC+2

France	3–0	Albania
Malouda 11'; Rémy 37'; Réveillère 66'	Report

Stade de France, Saint-Denis
Attendance: 65,239
Referee: Michael Koukoulakis (Greece)

11 October 2011
20:00 UTC+2

Albania	1–1	Romania
Salihi 24'	Report	Luchin 77'

Qemal Stafa, Tirana
Attendance: 3,000
Referee: Gediminas Mažeika (Lithuania)
11 October 2011
21:00 UTC+2

France	1–1	Bosnia and Herzegovina
Nasri 78' (pen.)	Report	Džeko 40'

Stade de France, Saint-Denis
Attendance: 78,467
Referee: Craig Thomson (Scotland)

== Goalscorers ==
There were 63 goals scored in 30 matches, for an average of 2.1 goals per match.

5 goals

- (Romania national football team) Adrian Mutu

4 goals

- (Bosnia and Herzegovina national football team) Edin Džeko

3 goals

- (Albania national football team) Hamdi Salihi
- (Bosnia and Herzegovina national football team) Haris Medunjanin
- (Bosnia and Herzegovina national football team) Zvjezdan Misimović
- (France national football team) Karim Benzema
- (France national football team) Yoann Gourcuff
- (France national football team) Florent Malouda
- (Romania national football team) Ciprian Marica

2 goals

- (Albania national football team) Erjon Bogdani
- (Belarus national football team) Sergei Kornilenko
- (Bosnia and Herzegovina national football team) Vedad Ibišević
- (Bosnia and Herzegovina national football team) Miralem Pjanić
- (France national football team) Loïc Rémy
- (Romania national football team) Gabriel Torje

1 goal

- (Albania national football team) Klodian Duro
- (Albania national football team) Gjergji Muzaka
- (Belarus national football team) Stanislaw Drahun
- (Belarus national football team) Syarhey Kislyak
- (Belarus national football team) Sergey Krivets
- (Belarus national football team) Anton Putsila
- (Belarus national football team) Vitali Rodionov
- (Bosnia and Herzegovina national football team) Senijad Ibričić
- (Bosnia and Herzegovina national football team) Darko Maletić
- (Bosnia and Herzegovina national football team) Sejad Salihović
- (France national football team) Yann M'Vila
- (France national football team) Philippe Mexès
- (France national football team) Samir Nasri
- (France national football team) Anthony Réveillère
- (Luxembourg national football team) Gilles Bettmer
- (Luxembourg national football team) Lars Krogh Gerson
- (Luxembourg national football team) Aurélien Joachim
- (Romania national football team) Srdjan Luchin
- (Romania national football team) Bogdan Stancu
- (Romania national football team) Ianis Zicu

1 own goal

- (France national football team) Eric Abidal (against Belarus)

== Discipline ==
Pos	Player	Country	Yellow card	Red card	Suspended for match(es)	Reason
MF	Timofei Kalachev	Belarus	5	1	vs Albania (26 March 2011) vs Romania (7 October 2011)	Booked in 2 UEFA Euro 2012 qualifying matches Sent off in a UEFA Euro 2012 qualifying match
DF	Mario Mutsch	Luxembourg	5	1	vs Belarus (8 October 2010)	Booked and sent off in two separate UEFA Euro 2012 qualifying matches
FW	Erjon Bogdani	Albania	4	1	vs France (7 October 2011)	Sent off in UEFA Euro 2012 qualifying match
DF	Armend Dallku	Albania	3	1	vs Belarus (26 March 2011)	Sent off in UEFA Euro 2012 qualifying match
DF	Aleksandr Martynovich	Belarus	2	1	vs Romania (7 October 2011)	Sent off in UEFA Euro 2012 qualifying match
DF	Klodian Duro	Albania	1	1	vs Romania (11 October 2011)	Sent off in UEFA Euro 2012 qualifying match
DF	Andi Lila	Albania	1	1	vs France (2 September 2011)	Sent off in UEFA Euro 2012 qualifying match
FW	Sergei Kornilenko	Belarus	1	1	vs Albania (12 October 2010) vs Albania (26 March 2011) vs France (3 June 2011)	Sent off in UEFA Euro 2012 qualifying match
MF	René Peters	Luxembourg	1	1	vs France (25 March 2011)	Sent off in UEFA Euro 2012 qualifying match
DF	Ansi Agolli	Albania	0	1	vs France (7 October 2011)	Sent off in UEFA Euro 2012 qualifying match
DF	Lorik Cana	Albania	3	0	vs Luxembourg (7 September 2011)	Booked in 2 UEFA Euro 2012 qualifying matches
DF	Emir Spahić	Bosnia and Herzegovina	3	0	vs Belarus (7 September 2011)	Booked in 2 UEFA Euro 2012 qualifying matches
DF	Adil Rami	France	3	0	vs Albania (2 September 2011)	Booked in 2 UEFA Euro 2012 qualifying matches
MF	Alyaksandr Kulchiy	Belarus	2	0	vs France (3 June 2011)	Booked in 2 UEFA Euro 2012 qualifying matches
DF	Dmitry Molosh	Belarus	2	0	vs France (3 June 2011)	Sent off in UEFA Euro 2012 qualifying match
DF	Anton Putsila	Belarus	2	0	vs Romania (7 October 2011)	Booked in 2 UEFA Euro 2012 qualifying matches
DF	Igor Shitov	Belarus	2	0	vs Romania (7 October 2011)	Booked in 2 UEFA Euro 2012 qualifying matches
DF	Vitali Trubila	Belarus	2	0	vs Romania (7 October 2011)	Booked in 2 UEFA Euro 2012 qualifying matches
FW	Darko Maletić	Bosnia and Herzegovina	2	0	vs Belarus (7 September 2011)	Booked in 2 UEFA Euro 2012 qualifying matches
MF	Miralem Pjanić	Bosnia and Herzegovina	2	0	vs Belarus (7 September 2011)	Booked in 2 UEFA Euro 2012 qualifying matches
DF	Saša Papac	Bosnia and Herzegovina	2	0	vs Portugal (Play-off match 11 November 2011)	Booked in 2 UEFA Euro 2012 qualifying matches
DF	Boris Pandža	Bosnia and Herzegovina	2	0	vs Portugal (Play-off match 11 November 2011)	Booked in 2 UEFA Euro 2012 qualifying matches
DF	Cristian Săpunaru	Romania	2	0	vs Luxembourg (2 September 2011)	Booked in 2 UEFA Euro 2012 qualifying matches
DF	Răzvan Raț	Romania	2	0	vs Albania (11 October 2011)	Booked in 2 UEFA Euro 2012 qualifying matches
DF	Gabriel Tamaș	Romania	2	0	TBD	Booked in 2 UEFA Euro 2012 qualifying matches
MF	Bănel Nicoliță	Romania	2	0	TBD	Booked in 2 UEFA Euro 2012 qualifying matches
MF	Sejad Salihović	Bosnia and Herzegovina	1	0	vs Luxembourg (3 September 2010) vs France (7 September 2010) vs Albania (8 October 2010) vs Romania (26 March 2011)	Sent off in 2010 FIFA World Cup qualification – UEFA second round match
MF	Yoann Gourcuff	France	0	0	vs Belarus (3 September 2010) vs Bosnia and Herzegovina (7 September 2010)	Sent off in 2010 FIFA World Cup match
