= Hesperange Castle =

Castle ruin in Luxembourg

Coordinates: 49°34′22″N 6°09′18″E

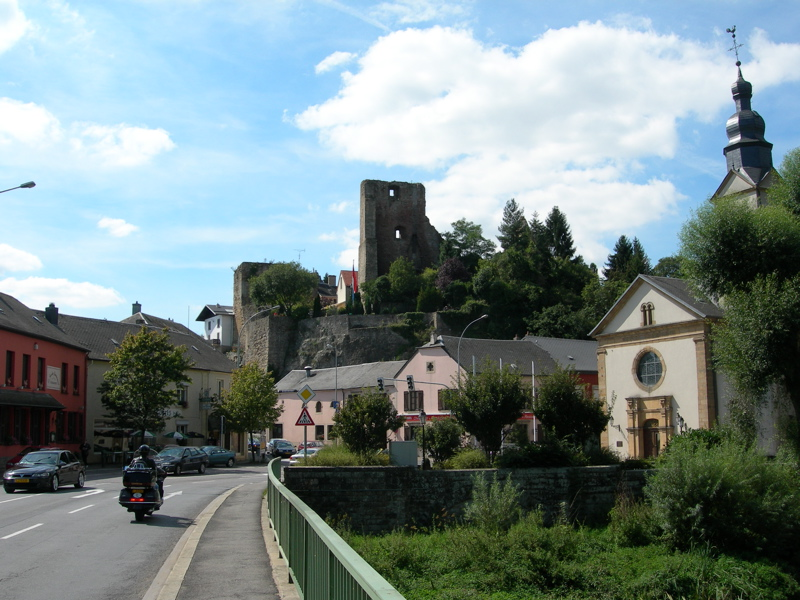
Hersperange Castle

Hesperange Castle (Luxembourgish: Buerg Hesper; French: Château de Hesperange) is a ruin located high above the town of Hesperange in southern Luxembourg.

== History ==
The castle probably dates from the early 13th century when the Counts of Luxembourg gave Hesperange to the Lords of Rodenmacher who sided with the French when the Burgundians conquered Luxembourg in 1443. Maximilian of Austria dismantled the castle in 1480 and 1482 after battles with Gerard of Rodenmacher. In 1492, he transferred it to the Lords of Baden who had to pawn it in 1692 and could only reclaim it in 1740. After the French captured the castle in 1796, the French government nationalized it and sold it by auction in 1798. Later parts of the ruins were sold individually and by 1820 seven houses stood on the castle grounds. Now a national monument, the ruins are still privately owned.

== See also ==
- List of castles in Luxembourg
