= Fentange =

Town in Hesperange, Luxembourg

Coordinates: 49°34′N 6°09′E

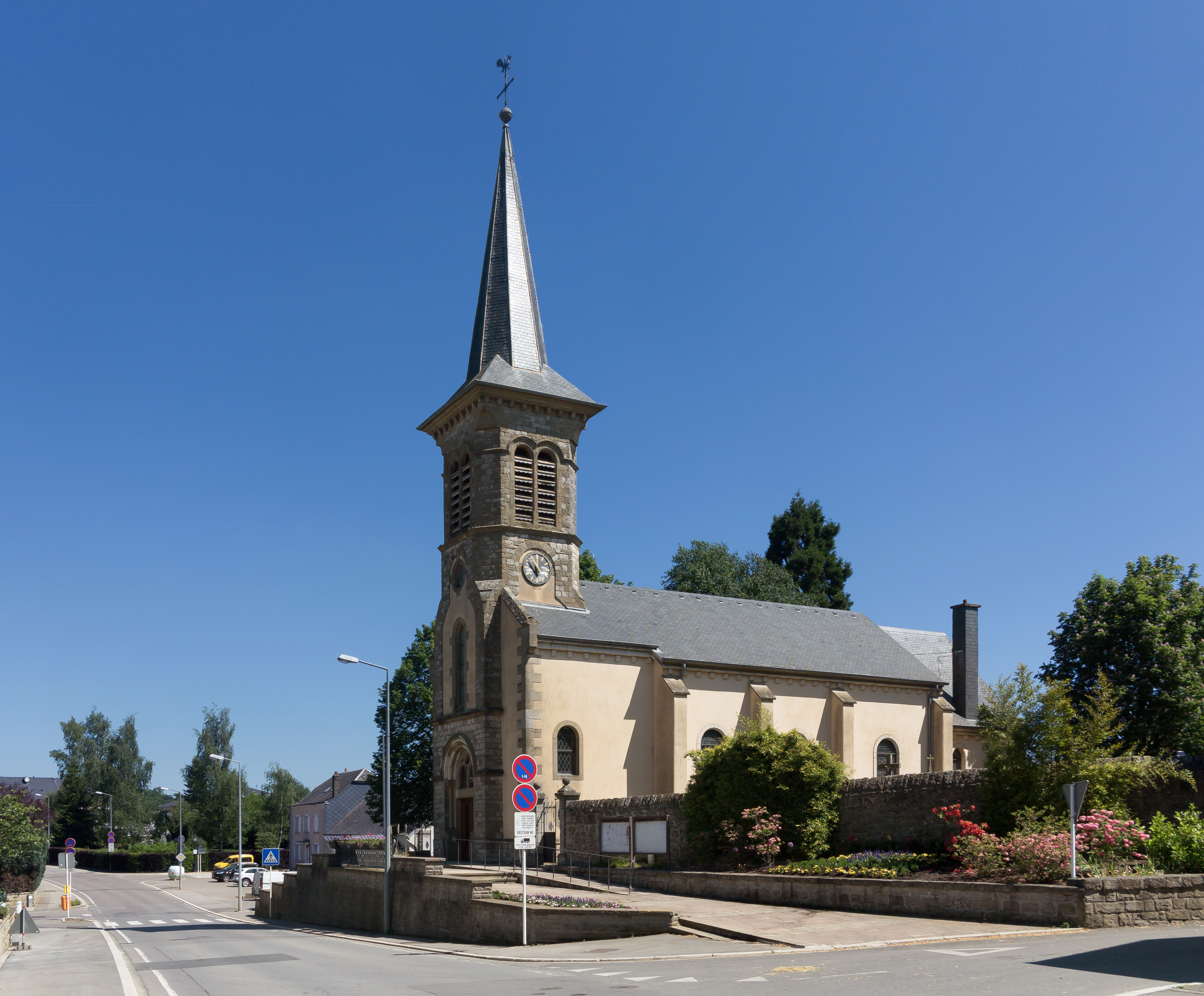
Fentange, church: l'église Saint-Luc

Fentange (Luxembourgish: Fenteng, German: Fentingen) is a town in the commune of Hesperange, in southern Luxembourg. As of September 2026, the town has a population of 2,688.
