= Gilles Bettmer =

Luxembourgish professional footballer

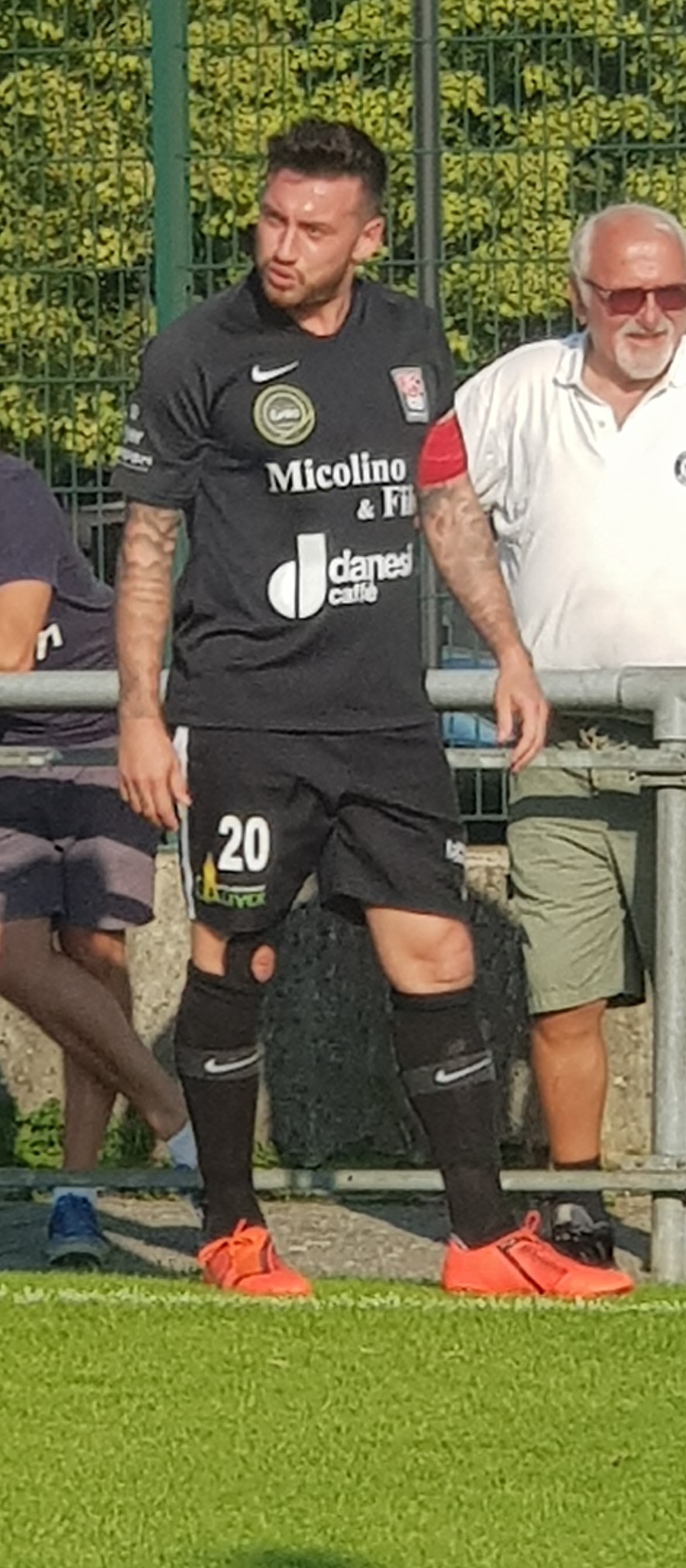
- Bettmer in 2019

Personal information
- Date of birth: 31 March 1989 (age 37)
- Place of birth: Esch-sur-Alzette, Luxembourg
- Height: 1.75 m (5 ft 9 in)
- Position: Defensive midfielder

Team information
- Current team: UN Käerjéng
- Number: 20

Youth career
- –2004: AS Differdange
- 2004–2008: SC Freiburg

Senior career*
| Years | Team | Apps | (Gls) |
| 2008–2009 | SC Freiburg II | 15 | (1) |
| 2010 | Eintracht Trier | 15 | (0) |
| 2010–2020 | FC Differdange 03 | 199 | (26) |
| 2020–2023 | UN Käerjéng | 38 | (5) |

International career^{‡}
| 2003-???? | Luxembourg U17 | 9 | (2) |
| 2009 | Luxembourg U21 | 2 | (0) |
| 2005–2013 | Luxembourg | 58 | (1) |
- * Club domestic league appearances and goals as of 1 June 2024 ‡ National team caps and goals as of 26 July 2020

Gilles Bettmer (born 31 March 1989) is a Luxembourgish professional footballer who last played as a defensive midfielder for UN Käerjéng.

== Club career ==
Bettmer was born in Esch-sur-Alzette. He joined SC Freiburg II in 2004 from local side AS Differdange and signed in January 2010 than for Eintracht Trier. After a half year with Eintracht Trier announced on 26 May 2010 his return to his youth club AS Differdange and signed a three years contract.

== International career ==
Bettmer made his debut for the Luxembourg national team in a November 2005 friendly match against Canada and by his last cap in 2013 had earned 58 caps, scoring one goal. He played in four FIFA World Cup qualification matches.

== Career statistics ==
As of match played 10 November 2017
Scores and results list Luxembourg's goal tally first, score column indicates score after each Bettmer goal.

List of international goals scored by Gilles Bettmer
| No. | Date | Venue | Opponent | Score | Result | Competition |
|---|---|---|---|---|---|---|
| 1 | 6 September 2011 | Stade Josy Barthel, Luxembourg City, Italy | Albania | 1–0 | 2–1 | UEFA Euro 2012 qualifying |
