= Anton Saroka =

Belarusian footballer (born 1992)

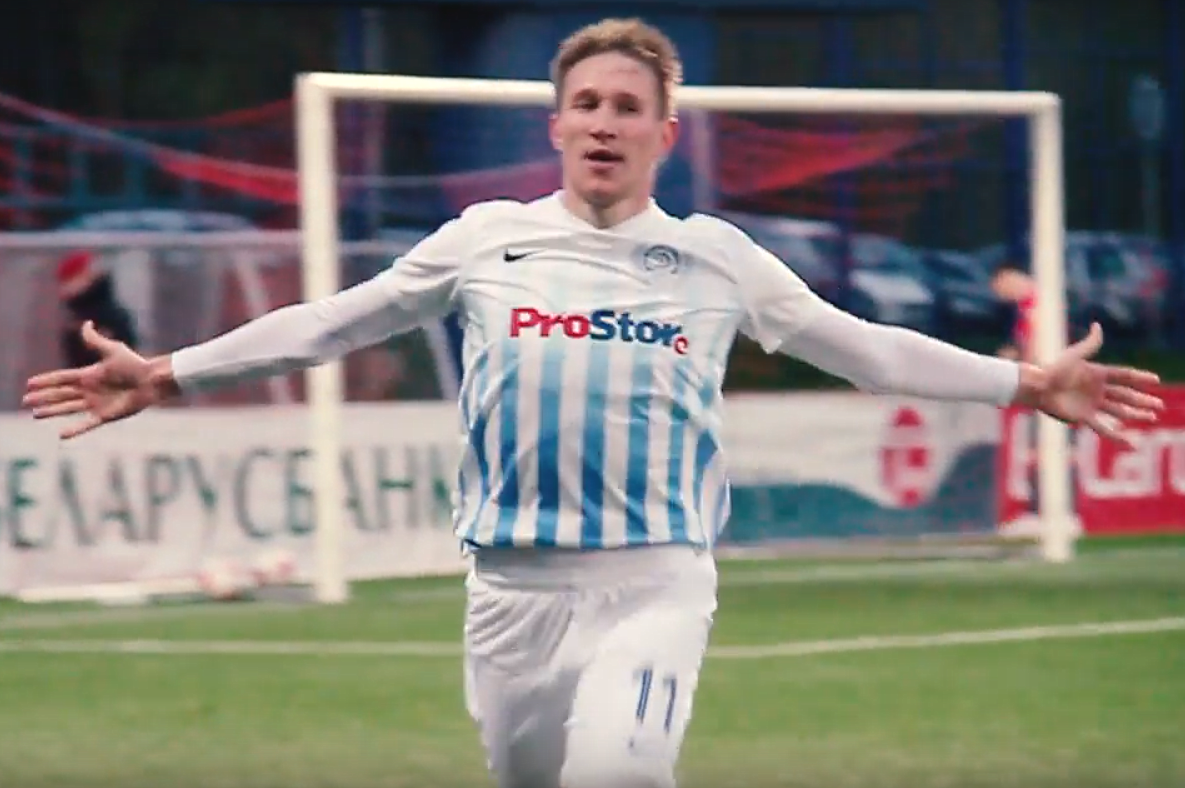

Personal information
- Date of birth: 5 March 1992 (age 34)
- Place of birth: Minsk, Belarus
- Height: 1.88 m (6 ft 2 in)
- Position: Forward

Team information
- Current team: Ostrovets

Youth career
- 2007–2010: Dinamo Minsk

Senior career*
Years	Team	Apps	(Gls)
2010–2011	Rubin Kazan	0	(0)
2011	→ Partizan-2 Minsk (loan)	13	(5)
2012–2016	Gorodeya	113	(43)
2017–2018	Dinamo Minsk	41	(16)
2018–2019	Lokeren	17	(1)
2019–2021	BATE Borisov	18	(4)
2021	Neman Grodno	7	(0)
2022	Arsenal Dzerzhinsk	10	(0)
2022–	Ostrovets	17	(1)

International career^{‡}
2012–2014	Belarus U21	16	(7)
2017–2019	Belarus	15	(7)
- * Club domestic league appearances and goals as of 31 December 2023 ‡ National team caps and goals as of 24 March 2019

Anton Saroka (Belarusian: Антон Сарока; Russian: Антон Сарока; born 5 March 1992) is a Belarusian professional football player who plays for Ostrovets.

== Honours ==
BATE Borisov

- Belarusian Cup winner: 2019–20, 2020–21

== International career ==
=== International goals ===
Scores and results list Belarus' goal tally first.

No	Date	Venue	Opponent	Score	Result	Competition
1.	10 October 2017	Stade de France, Paris, France	France	1–2	1–2	2018 FIFA World Cup qualification
2.	9 November 2017	Vazgen Sargsyan Republican Stadium, Yerevan, Armenia	Armenia	1–3	1–4	Friendly
3.	27 March 2018	Stožice Stadium, Ljubljana, Slovenia	Slovenia	2–0	2–0	Friendly
4.	6 June 2018	Regional Sport Complex Brestsky, Brest, Belarus	Hungary	1–0	1–1	Friendly
5.	8 September 2018	Dinamo Stadium, Minsk, Belarus	San Marino	3–0	5–0	2018–19 UEFA Nations League D
6.	12 October 2018	Dinamo Stadium, Minsk, Belarus	Luxembourg	1–0	1–0	2018–19 UEFA Nations League D
7.	18 November 2018	San Marino Stadium, Serravalle, San Marino	San Marino	2–0	2–0	2018–19 UEFA Nations League D

== Personal life ==
On 12 August 2020, during the 2020 Belarusian protests, Saroka was arrested for participating in the demonstrations. He was released on 14 August.
