= Lars Gerson =

Luxembourgish footballer (born 1990)

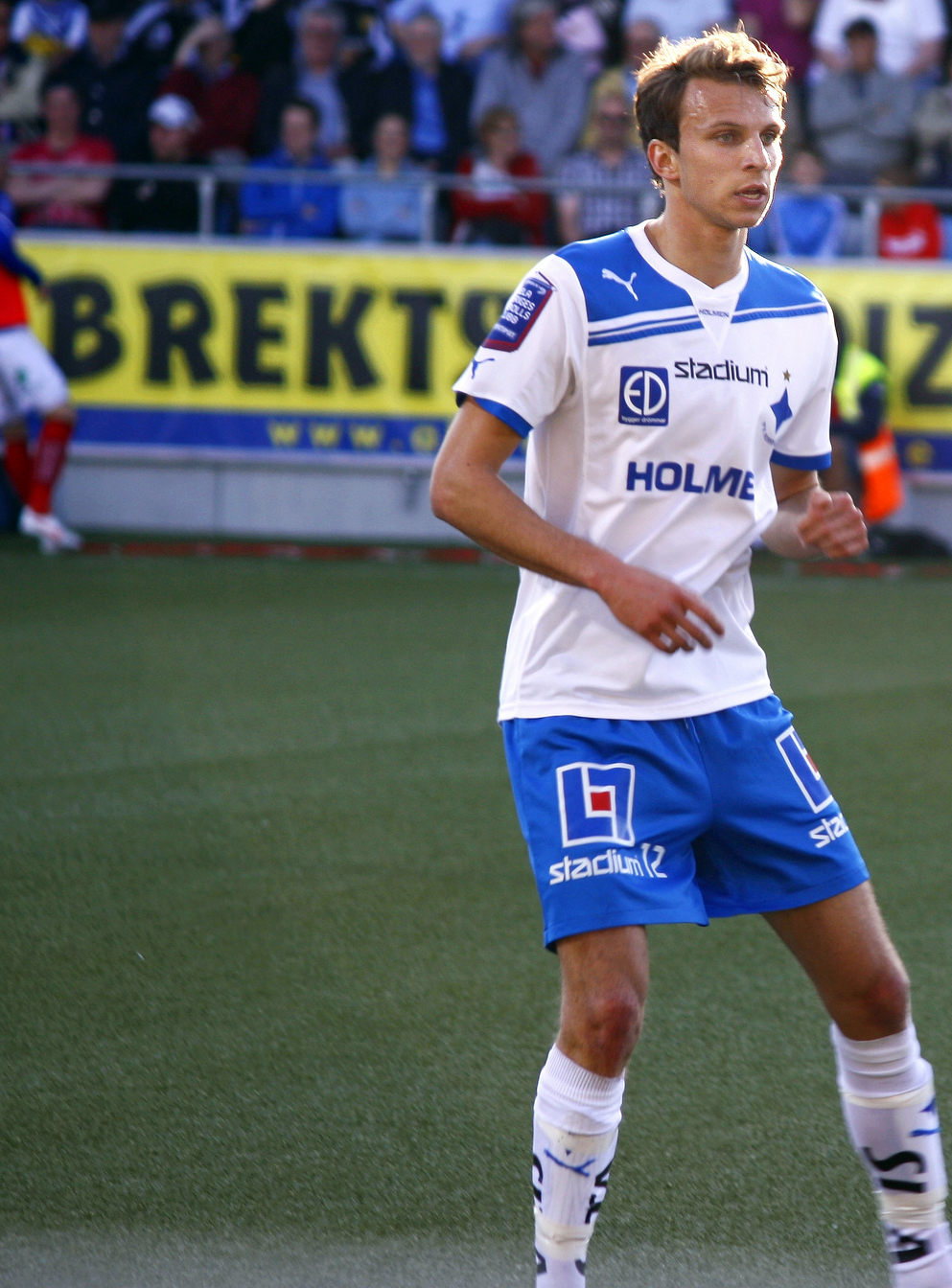
- Gerson with IFK Norrköping in 2012

Personal information
- Full name: Lars Christian Krogh Gerson
- Date of birth: 5 February 1990 (age 36)
- Place of birth: Luxembourg City, Luxembourg
- Height: 1.86 m (6 ft 1 in)
- Position: Central defender

Team information
- Current team: Käerjéng
- Number: 3

Youth career
- Kongsvinger

Senior career*
Years	Team	Apps	(Gls)
2008–2011	Kongsvinger	58	(7)
2012–2014	IFK Norrköping	75	(9)
2015–2017	GIF Sundsvall	73	(6)
2018–2020	IFK Norrköping	78	(8)
2021	Racing de Santander	4	(0)
2021	Brann	1	(0)
2022–2024	Kongsvinger	62	(3)
2025	Progrès Niederkorn	12	(1)
2025–	Käerjéng	29	(2)

International career^{‡}
2009–2011	Luxembourg U21	4	(0)
2008–	Luxembourg	100	(4)
- * Club domestic league appearances and goals as of 5 June 2026 ‡ National team caps and goals as of 10 June 2025

Lars Christian Krogh Gerson (born 5 February 1990) is a Luxembourgish professional footballer who plays as a central defender for Luxembourg National Division side Käerjéng and the Luxembourg national team.

== International career ==
Gerson made his debut for Luxembourg on 26 March 2008, in a 0–2 friendly loss against Wales.

Gerson has also represented Luxembourg at youth level, a.o. at the under-17 European Championship of 2006.

On 10 June 2025, Gerson made his 100th international appearance in a friendly match against the Republic of Ireland.

== Personal life ==
Gerson was born in Luxembourg City to a Luxembourgish father and Norwegian mother. His maternal grandfather is the Norwegian anchorman Lars-Jacob Krogh.

== Career statistics ==
=== Club ===
As of match played 28 October 2021

Appearances and goals by club, season and competition
Club	Season	League			National cup		Continental		Total	
Club	Season	Division	Apps	Goals	Apps	Goals	Apps	Goals	Apps	Goals
Kongsvinger	2008	Adeccoligaen	7	0	0	0	—		7	0
Kongsvinger	2009	Adeccoligaen	0	0	0	0	—		0	0
Kongsvinger	2010	Tippeligaen	21	1	1	1	—		22	2
Kongsvinger	2011	Adeccoligaen	30	6	1	0	—		31	6
Kongsvinger	Total		58	7	2	1	—		60	8
IFK Norrköping	2012	Allsvenskan	28	2	5	1	—		33	3
IFK Norrköping	2013	Allsvenskan	28	4	2	0	—		30	4
IFK Norrköping	2014	Allsvenskan	19	3	0	0	—		19	3
IFK Norrköping	Total		75	9	7	1	—		82	9
GIF Sundsvall	2015	Allsvenskan	29	1	4	0	—		33	1
GIF Sundsvall	2016	Allsvenskan	24	4	1	0	—		25	4
GIF Sundsvall	2017	Allsvenskan	10	1	0	0	—		10	1
GIF Sundsvall	Total		63	6	5	0	—		68	6
IFK Norrköping	2018	Allsvenskan	24	1	2	0	—		26	1
IFK Norrköping	2019	Allsvenskan	28	4	4	0	6 (Note: Appearances in UEFA Europa League)	0	38	4
IFK Norrköping	2020	Allsvenskan	26	3	4	0	—		30	3
IFK Norrköping	Total		78	8	10	0	6	0	94	8
Racing de Santander	2020–21	Segunda División B	4	0	0	0	—		4	0
Brann	2021	Eliteserien	1	0	0	0	—		1	0
Career total			279	30	24	2	6	0	309	32

=== International ===
As of match played 10 June 2025

Appearances and goals by national team and year
National team	Year	Apps	Goals
Luxembourg	2008	5	0
Luxembourg	2009	1	0
Luxembourg	2010	3	0
Luxembourg	2011	10	1
Luxembourg	2012	7	1
Luxembourg	2013	8	0
Luxembourg	2014	7 (Note: Included one Non Fifa match)	1
Luxembourg	2015	10	1
Luxembourg	2016	5	0
Luxembourg	2017	4	0
Luxembourg	2018	6	0
Luxembourg	2019	9	0
Luxembourg	2020	7	0
Luxembourg	2021	3	0
Luxembourg	2022	5	0
Luxembourg	2023	6	0
Luxembourg	2024	2	0
Luxembourg	2025	2	0
Total		100	4

As of 13 October 2015

Score lists Luxembourg's goal tally first.

#	Date	Venue	Opponent	Score	Result	Competition
1	29 March 2011	Stadionul Ceahlăul, Piatra Neamț, Romania	Romania	1–0	1–3	UEFA Euro 2012 qualifying
2	14 November 2012	Stade Josy Barthel, Luxembourg City, Luxembourg	Scotland	1–2	1–2	Friendly
3	9 September 2014	Stade Josy Barthel, Luxembourg City, Luxembourg	Belarus	1–0	1–1	UEFA Euro 2016 qualifying
4	12 October 2015	Stade Josy Barthel, Luxembourg City, Luxembourg	Slovakia	2–3	2–4	UEFA Euro 2016 qualifying

== See also ==
- List of men's footballers with 100 or more international caps
