= 2018 FIFA World Cup qualification – UEFA Group A =

The 2018 FIFA World Cup qualification UEFA Group A was one of the nine UEFA groups for 2018 FIFA World Cup qualification. The group consisted of six teams: Netherlands, France, Sweden, Bulgaria, Belarus, and Luxembourg.

The draw for the first round (group stage) was held as part of the 2018 FIFA World Cup Preliminary Draw on 25 July 2015, starting 18:00 MSK (UTC+3), at the Konstantinovsky Palace in Strelna, Saint Petersburg, Russia.

The group winners, France, qualified directly for the 2018 FIFA World Cup. The group runners-up, Sweden, advanced to the play-offs as one of the best eight runners-up.

== Standings ==
2018 FIFA World Cup qualification tiebreakers
In league format, the ranking of teams in each group was based on the following criteria (regulations Articles 20.6 and 20.7):
1. Points (3 points for a win, 1 point for a draw, 0 points for a loss)
2. Overall goal difference
3. Overall goals scored
4. Points in matches between tied teams
5. Goal difference in matches between tied teams
6. Goals scored in matches between tied teams
7. Away goals scored in matches between tied teams (if the tie was only between two teams in home-and-away league format)
8. Fair play points
  - first yellow card: minus 1 point
  - indirect red card (second yellow card): minus 3 points
  - direct red card: minus 4 points
  - yellow card and direct red card: minus 5 points
9. Drawing of lots by the FIFA Organising Committee

Pos	Team	Pld	W	D	L	GF	GA	GD	Pts	Qualification	France	Sweden	Netherlands	Bulgaria	Luxembourg	Belarus
1	France	10	7	2	1	18	6	+12	23	Qualification to 2018 FIFA World Cup	—	2–1	4–0	4–1	0–0	2–1
2	Sweden	10	6	1	3	26	9	+17	19	Advance to second round	2–1	—	1–1	3–0	8–0	4–0
3	Netherlands	10	6	1	3	21	12	+9	19		0–1	2–0	—	3–1	5–0	4–1
4	Bulgaria	10	4	1	5	14	19	−5	13		0–1	3–2	2–0	—	4–3	1–0
5	Luxembourg	10	1	3	6	8	26	−18	6		1–3	0–1	1–3	1–1	—	1–0
6	Belarus	10	1	2	7	6	21	−15	5		0–0	0–4	1–3	2–1	1–1	—

Source: FIFA
Rules for classification: Qualification tiebreakers

== Matches ==
The fixture list was confirmed by UEFA on 26 July 2015, the day following the draw. Times are CET/CEST, (Note: CET (UTC+1) for matches on 11 and 13 November 2016 and 25 March 2017, and CEST (UTC+2) for all other matches.) as listed by UEFA (local times are in parentheses).

6 September 2016
20:45
(21:45 UTC+3)

Belarus	0–0	France
	Report (FIFA); Report (UEFA)

Borisov Arena, Barysaw
Attendance: 12,920
Referee: Ovidiu Hațegan (Romania)
6 September 2016
20:45
(21:45 UTC+3)

Bulgaria	4–3	Luxembourg
Rangelov 16'; Marcelinho 65'; I. Popov 79'; Tonev 90+2'	Report (FIFA); Report (UEFA)	Joachim 60', 62'; Bohnert 90+1'

Vasil Levski National Stadium, Sofia
Attendance: 4,202
Referee: Gediminas Mažeika (Lithuania)
6 September 2016
20:45
(20:45 UTC+2)

Sweden	1–1	Netherlands
Berg 43'	Report (FIFA); Report (UEFA)	Sneijder 67'

Friends Arena, Solna
Attendance: 36,128
Referee: Daniele Orsato (Italy)

7 October 2016
20:45
(20:45 UTC+2)

France	4–1	Bulgaria
Gameiro 23', 59'; Payet 26'; Griezmann 38'	Report (FIFA); Report (UEFA)	M. Aleksandrov 6' (pen.)

Stade de France, Saint-Denis
Attendance: 65,475
Referee: Luca Banti (Italy)
7 October 2016
20:45
(20:45 UTC+2)

Luxembourg	0–1	Sweden
	Report (FIFA); Report (UEFA)	Lustig 58'

Stade Josy Barthel, Luxembourg City
Attendance: 5,057
Referee: Ivan Bebek (Croatia)
7 October 2016
20:45
(20:45 UTC+2)

Netherlands	4–1	Belarus
Promes 15', 31'; Klaassen 56'; Janssen 64'	Report (FIFA); Report (UEFA)	Rios 47'

De Kuip, Rotterdam
Attendance: 41,200
Referee: Craig Thomson (Scotland)

10 October 2016
20:45
(21:45 UTC+3)

Belarus	1–1	Luxembourg
Savitski 80'	Report (FIFA); Report (UEFA)	Joachim 85'

Borisov Arena, Barysaw
Attendance: 9,011
Referee: Tobias Welz (Germany)
10 October 2016
20:45
(20:45 UTC+2)

Netherlands	0–1	France
	Report (FIFA); Report (UEFA)	Pogba 30'

Amsterdam Arena, Amsterdam
Attendance: 50,220
Referee: Damir Skomina (Slovenia)
10 October 2016
20:45
(20:45 UTC+2)

Sweden	3–0	Bulgaria
Toivonen 39'; Hiljemark 45'; Lindelöf 58'	Report (FIFA); Report (UEFA)

Friends Arena, Solna
Attendance: 21,777
Referee: Michael Oliver (England)

11 November 2016 (Note: The France v Sweden match was moved from the original scheduled date of 13 November 2016 as it fell on the anniversary of the 2015 Paris terrorist attacks.)
20:45
(20:45 UTC+1)

France	2–1	Sweden
Pogba 58'; Payet 65'	Report (FIFA); Report (UEFA)	Forsberg 55'

Stade de France, Saint-Denis
Attendance: 80,000
Referee: Milorad Mažić (Serbia)
13 November 2016
18:00
(19:00 UTC+2)

Bulgaria	1–0	Belarus
I. Popov 10'	Report (FIFA); Report (UEFA)

Vasil Levski National Stadium, Sofia
Attendance: 1,994
Referee: Stephan Klossner (Switzerland)
13 November 2016
18:00
(18:00 UTC+1)

Luxembourg	1–3	Netherlands
Chanot 44' (pen.)	Report (FIFA); Report (UEFA)	Robben 36'; Depay 58', 84'

Stade Josy Barthel, Luxembourg City
Attendance: 8,000
Referee: Anthony Taylor (England)

25 March 2017
18:00
(18:00 UTC+1)

Sweden	4–0	Belarus
Forsberg 19' (pen.), 49'; Berg 57'; Kiese Thelin 78'	Report (FIFA); Report (UEFA)

Friends Arena, Solna
Attendance: 31,243
Referee: Harald Lechner (Austria)
25 March 2017
20:45
(21:45 UTC+2)

Bulgaria	2–0	Netherlands
Delev 5', 20'	Report (FIFA); Report (UEFA)

Vasil Levski National Stadium, Sofia
Attendance: 10,900
Referee: Willie Collum (Scotland)
25 March 2017
20:45
(20:45 UTC+1)

Luxembourg	1–3	France
Joachim 34' (pen.)	Report (FIFA); Report (UEFA)	Giroud 28', 77'; Griezmann 37' (pen.)

Stade Josy Barthel, Luxembourg City
Attendance: 8,000
Referee: Andris Treimanis (Latvia)

9 June 2017
20:45
(21:45 UTC+3)

Belarus	2–1	Bulgaria
Sivakow 33' (pen.); Savitski 80'	Report (FIFA); Report (UEFA)	Kostadinov 90+1'

Borisov Arena, Barysaw
Attendance: 6,150
Referee: Matej Jug (Slovenia)
9 June 2017
20:45
(20:45 UTC+2)

Netherlands	5–0	Luxembourg
Robben 21'; Sneijder 34'; Wijnaldum 62'; Promes 70'; Janssen 84' (pen.)	Report (FIFA); Report (UEFA)

De Kuip, Rotterdam
Attendance: 41,300
Referee: Bartosz Frankowski (Poland)
9 June 2017
20:45
(20:45 UTC+2)

Sweden	2–1	France
Durmaz 43'; Toivonen 90+4'	Report (FIFA); Report (UEFA)	Giroud 37'

Friends Arena, Solna
Attendance: 48,783
Referee: Martin Atkinson (England)

31 August 2017
20:45
(21:45 UTC+3)

Bulgaria	3–2	Sweden
Manolev 12'; Kostadinov 33'; Chochev 79'	Report (FIFA); Report (UEFA)	Lustig 29'; Berg 44'

Vasil Levski National Stadium, Sofia
Attendance: 12,121
Referee: Paolo Tagliavento (Italy)
31 August 2017
20:45
(20:45 UTC+2)

France	4–0	Netherlands
Griezmann 14'; Lemar 73', 88'; Mbappé 90+1'	Report (FIFA); Report (UEFA)

Stade de France, Saint-Denis
Attendance: 79,551
Referee: Gianluca Rocchi (Italy)
31 August 2017
20:45
(20:45 UTC+2)

Luxembourg	1–0	Belarus
Da Mota 60'	Report (FIFA); Report (UEFA)

Stade Josy Barthel, Luxembourg City
Attendance: 2,752
Referee: Clayton Pisani (Malta)

3 September 2017
18:00
(19:00 UTC+3)

Belarus	0–4	Sweden
	Report (FIFA); Report (UEFA)	Forsberg 18'; Nyman 24'; Berg 37'; Granqvist 84' (pen.)

Borisov Arena, Barysaw
Attendance: 6,431
Referee: Tobias Stieler (Germany)
3 September 2017
18:00
(18:00 UTC+2)

Netherlands	3–1	Bulgaria
Pröpper 7', 80'; Robben 67'	Report (FIFA); Report (UEFA)	Kostadinov 69'

Amsterdam Arena, Amsterdam
Attendance: 47,079
Referee: Anastasios Sidiropoulos (Greece)
3 September 2017
20:45
(20:45 UTC+2)

France	0–0	Luxembourg
	Report (FIFA); Report (UEFA)

Stade Municipal, Toulouse
Attendance: 31,177
Referee: Aleksandar Stavrev (Macedonia)

7 October 2017
18:00
(18:00 UTC+2)

Sweden	8–0	Luxembourg
Granqvist 10' (pen.), 67' (pen.); Berg 18', 37', 54', 71'; Lustig 60'; Toivonen 76'	Report (FIFA); Report (UEFA)

Friends Arena, Solna
Attendance: 50,022
Referee: Hüseyin Göçek (Turkey)
7 October 2017
20:45
(21:45 UTC+3)

Belarus	1–3	Netherlands
Valadzko 55'	Report (FIFA); Report (UEFA)	Pröpper 25'; Robben 84' (pen.); Depay 90+3'

Borisov Arena, Barysaw
Attendance: 6,850
Referee: Michael Oliver (England)
7 October 2017
20:45
(21:45 UTC+3)

Bulgaria	0–1	France
	Report (FIFA); Report (UEFA)	Matuidi 3'

Vasil Levski National Stadium, Sofia
Attendance: 12,921
Referee: Antonio Mateu Lahoz (Spain)

10 October 2017
20:45
(20:45 UTC+2)

France	2–1	Belarus
Griezmann 27'; Giroud 33'	Report (FIFA); Report (UEFA)	Saroka 44'

Stade de France, Saint-Denis
Attendance: 74,037
Referee: Halis Özkahya (Turkey)
10 October 2017
20:45
(20:45 UTC+2)

Luxembourg	1–1	Bulgaria
O. Thill 3'	Report (FIFA); Report (UEFA)	Chochev 68'

Stade Josy Barthel, Luxembourg City
Attendance: 2,936
Referee: István Vad (Hungary)
10 October 2017
20:45
(20:45 UTC+2)

Netherlands	2–0	Sweden
Robben 16', 40'	Report (FIFA); Report (UEFA)

Amsterdam Arena, Amsterdam
Attendance: 41,244
Referee: Sergei Karasev (Russia)

== Goalscorers ==
There were 93 goals scored in 30 matches, for an average of 3.1 goals per match.

8 goals

- (Sweden) Marcus Berg

6 goals

- (Netherlands) Arjen Robben

4 goals

- (France) Olivier Giroud
- (France) Antoine Griezmann
- (Luxembourg) Aurélien Joachim
- (Sweden) Emil Forsberg

3 goals

- (Bulgaria) Georgi Kostadinov
- (Netherlands) Memphis Depay
- (Netherlands) Quincy Promes
- (Netherlands) Davy Pröpper
- (Sweden) Andreas Granqvist
- (Sweden) Mikael Lustig
- (Sweden) Ola Toivonen

2 goals

- (Belarus) Pavel Savitski
- (Bulgaria) Ivaylo Chochev
- (Bulgaria) Spas Delev
- (Bulgaria) Ivelin Popov
- (France) Kevin Gameiro
- (France) Thomas Lemar
- (France) Dimitri Payet
- (France) Paul Pogba
- (Netherlands) Vincent Janssen
- (Netherlands) Wesley Sneijder

1 goal

- (Belarus) Alexei Rios
- (Belarus) Anton Saroka
- (Belarus) Mikhail Sivakow
- (Belarus) Maksim Valadzko
- (Bulgaria) Mihail Aleksandrov
- (Bulgaria) Stanislav Manolev
- (Bulgaria) Marcelinho
- (Bulgaria) Dimitar Rangelov
- (Bulgaria) Aleksandar Tonev
- (France) Blaise Matuidi
- (France) Kylian Mbappé
- (Luxembourg) Florian Bohnert
- (Luxembourg) Maxime Chanot
- (Luxembourg) Daniel da Mota
- (Luxembourg) Olivier Thill
- (Netherlands) Davy Klaassen
- (Netherlands) Georginio Wijnaldum
- (Sweden) Jimmy Durmaz
- (Sweden) Oscar Hiljemark
- (Sweden) Isaac Kiese Thelin
- (Sweden) Victor Lindelöf
- (Sweden) Christoffer Nyman

== Discipline ==
A player was automatically suspended for the next match for the following offences:

- Receiving a red card (red card suspensions could be extended for serious offences)
- Receiving two yellow cards in two different matches (yellow card suspensions were carried forward to the play-offs, but not the finals or any other future international matches)

The following suspensions were served during the qualifying matches:

Player	Team	Offence(s)	Suspended for match(es)
Kevin Malget	Luxembourg	(yellow card) (yellow-red card) vs Sweden (7 October 2016)	vs Belarus (10 October 2016)
Dirk Carlson	Luxembourg	(yellow card) (yellow-red card) vs Belarus (10 October 2016)	vs Netherlands (13 November 2016)
Kevin Strootman	Netherlands	(yellow card) vs Sweden (6 September 2016); (yellow card) vs France (10 October 2016)	vs Luxembourg (13 November 2016)
Paul Pogba	France	(yellow card) vs Netherlands (10 October 2016); (yellow card) vs Sweden (11 November 2016)	vs Luxembourg (25 March 2017)
Alexander Hleb	Belarus	(yellow card) (yellow-red card) vs Bulgaria (13 November 2016)	vs Sweden (25 March 2017)
Aleksandar Aleksandrov	Bulgaria	(yellow card) vs Sweden (10 October 2016); (yellow card) vs Belarus (13 November 2016)	vs Netherlands (25 March 2017)
Alyaksandr Martynovich	Belarus	(yellow card) vs Luxembourg (10 October 2016); (yellow card) vs Sweden (25 March 2017)	vs Bulgaria (9 June 2017)
Aurélien Joachim	Luxembourg	(yellow card) vs Belarus (10 October 2016); (yellow card) vs France (25 March 2017)	vs Netherlands (9 June 2017)
Daniel da Mota	Luxembourg	(yellow card) vs Sweden (7 October 2016); (yellow card) vs France (25 March 2017)	vs Netherlands (9 June 2017)
Chris Philipps	Luxembourg	(yellow card) vs Sweden (7 October 2016); (yellow card) vs France (25 March 2017)	vs Netherlands (9 June 2017)
Svetoslav Dyakov	Bulgaria	(yellow card) vs Belarus (13 November 2016); (yellow card) vs Belarus (9 June 2017)	vs Sweden (31 August 2017)
Kevin Malget	Luxembourg	(yellow card) vs Sweden (7 October 2016); (yellow card) vs Netherlands (9 June 2017)	vs Belarus (31 August 2017)
Christopher Martins	Luxembourg	(yellow card) vs Bulgaria (6 September 2016); (yellow card) vs Netherlands (9 June 2017)	vs Belarus (31 August 2017)
Bozhidar Chorbadzhiyski	Bulgaria	(yellow card) vs Belarus (9 June 2017); (yellow card) vs Sweden (31 August 2017)	vs Netherlands (3 September 2017)
Kevin Strootman	Netherlands	(yellow card) (yellow-red card) vs France (31 August 2017)	vs Bulgaria (3 September 2017)
Ola Toivonen	Sweden	(yellow card) vs Luxembourg (7 October 2016); (yellow card) vs Bulgaria (31 August 2017)	vs Belarus (3 September 2017)
Egor Filipenko	Belarus	(yellow card) vs Bulgaria (9 June 2017); (yellow card) vs Sweden (3 September 2017)	vs Netherlands (7 October 2017)
Nikita Korzun	Belarus	(yellow card) vs Luxembourg (10 October 2016); (yellow card) vs Sweden (3 September 2017)	vs Netherlands (7 October 2017)
Ivaylo Chochev	Bulgaria	(yellow card) vs Sweden (31 August 2017); (yellow card) vs Netherlands (3 September 2017)	vs France (7 October 2017)
Ivelin Popov	Bulgaria	(yellow card) vs Luxembourg (6 September 2016); (yellow card) vs Netherlands (3 September 2017)	vs France (7 October 2017)
Christoffer Nyman	Sweden	(yellow card) vs Netherlands (6 September 2016); (yellow card) vs Belarus (3 September 2017)	vs Luxembourg (7 October 2017)
Paul Pogba	France	(yellow card) vs Sweden (9 June 2017); (yellow card) vs Luxembourg (3 September 2017)	vs Bulgaria (7 October 2017)
Laurent Jans	Luxembourg	(yellow card) vs Netherlands (9 June 2017); (yellow card) vs France (3 September 2017)	vs Sweden (7 October 2017)
Syarhey Balanovich	Belarus	(yellow card) vs Luxembourg (31 August 2017); (yellow card) vs Netherlands (7 October 2017)	vs France (10 October 2017)
Alexei Rios	Belarus	(yellow card) vs Netherlands (7 October 2016); (yellow card) vs Netherlands (7 October 2017)	vs France (10 October 2017)
Mikalay Signevich	Belarus	(yellow card) vs Luxembourg (10 October 2016); (yellow card) vs Netherlands (7 October 2017)	vs France (10 October 2017)
Georgi Kostadinov	Bulgaria	(yellow card) vs Sweden (31 August 2017); (yellow card) vs France (7 October 2017)	vs Luxembourg (10 October 2017)
