= René Peters (footballer) =

Luxembourgish footballer

Personal information
- Date of birth: 15 June 1981 (age 45)
- Place of birth: Dudelange, Luxembourg
- Position: Midfielder

Youth career
- Tétange

Senior career*
Years	Team	Apps	(Gls)
1999–2000	Standard Liège	0	(0)
2000–2001	Créteil	0	(0)
2001–2008	Swift Hesperange	176	(13)
2008–2012	Jeunesse Esch	81	(8)
2012–2014	FC RM Hamm Benfica	50	(14)
2014–2016	CS Grevenmacher	46	(2)
2016–2017	Jeunesse Esch	21	(2)
2017–2019	US Hostert	48	(6)
Total		422	(45)

International career
2000–2013	Luxembourg	91	(4)

Managerial career
- 2019–2020: US Hostert
- * Club domestic league appearances and goals

René Peters (born 15 June 1981) is a Luxembourgish football manager and former player. A midfielder, he was captain of the Luxembourg national team during his playing days.

== Club career ==
Peters was member of the professional squad of Belgian side Standard Liège in the 99/00 season but did not make the grade there and moved to French Ligue 2 outfit Créteil only to leave them after one season to stay with Swift Hesperange for seven seasons.

In summer 2008 he joined Jeunesse Esch.

== International career ==
Peters made his debut for the Luxembourg national team in an April 2000 friendly match against Estonia and by the end of his international career had earned 91 caps, scoring 4 goals. He played in 21 FIFA World Cup qualification matches.

He scored an international goal for Luxembourg on 11 October 2008 against Israel in the qualifying campaign for the 2010 FIFA World Cup.

== Career statistics ==
Scores and results list Luxembourg's goal tally first.

#	Date	Venue	Opponent	Score	Result	Competition
1	6 October 2001	Partizan Stadium, Belgrade, Yugoslavia	Yugoslavia	1–1	2–6	2002 World Cup qualifying
2	24 February 2004	Estadio Municipal Bahía Sur, San Fernando, Spain	Faroe Islands	1–1	2–4	friendly match*
3	30 January 2008	King Fahd Stadium, Riyadh, Saudi Arabia	Saudi Arabia	1–2	1–2	friendly match
4	11 October 2008	Stade Josy Barthel, Luxembourg (city), Luxembourg	Israel	1–1	1–3	2010 World Cup qualifying

[*] Note: Not a full FIFA international, and unofficial for Faroe Islands.
