= Stade Alphonse Theis =

Football stadium in Hesperange, Luxembourg

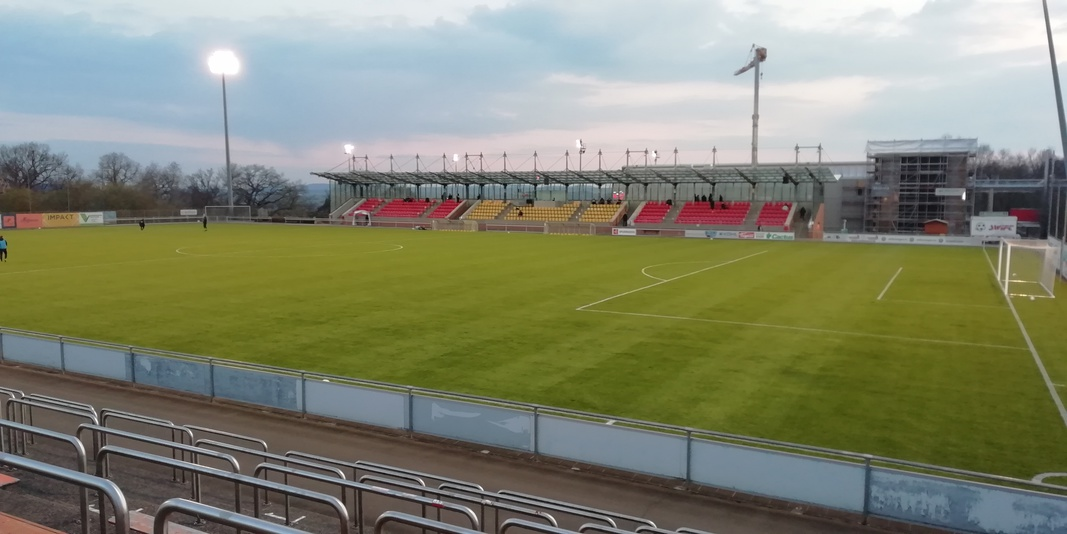
- View of the main stand at Stade Alphonse Theis
- Interactive map of Stade Alphonse Theis
- Full name: Stade Alphonse Theis
- Location: Hesperange, Luxembourg
- Coordinates: 49°34′30″N 6°09′27″E
- Capacity: 3,058
- Surface: grass

Tenant
- FC Swift Hesperange

Stade Alphonse Theis is a football stadium in Hesperange, in southern Luxembourg. It is currently the home stadium of FC Swift Hesperange. The stadium has a capacity of 3,058.
