= Hesperange =

Commune in Luxembourg

Hesperange Hesper (Luxembourgish) Hesperingen (German)
- Commune
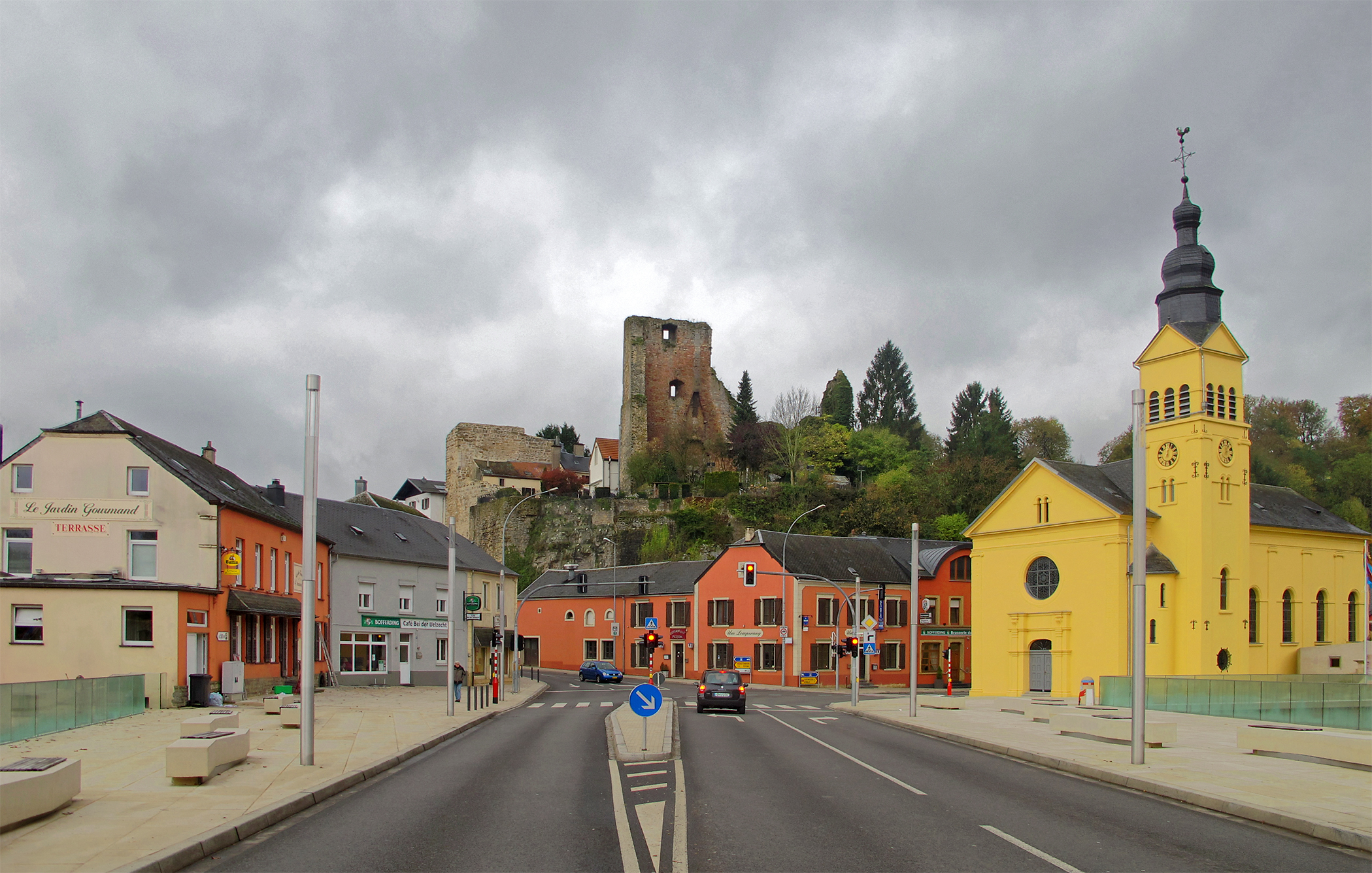
- View on Hesperange with its castle

- Coat of arms

- Map of Luxembourg with Hesperange highlighted in orange, and the canton in dark red
- Coordinates: 49.5708°N 6.1514°E
- Country: Luxembourg
- Canton: Luxembourg

Government
  - Mayor: Diane Adehm (CSV)

Area
  - Total: 27.22 km^{2} (10.51 sq mi)
  - Rank: 32nd of 100
- Highest elevation: 334 m (1,096 ft)
  - Rank: 90th of 100
- Lowest elevation: 255 m (837 ft)
  - Rank: 58th of 100

Population (2025)
  - Total: 17,146
  - Rank: 7th of 100
  - Density: 629.9/km^{2} (1,631/sq mi)
  - Rank: 14th of 100
- Time zone: UTC+1 (CET)
  - Summer (DST): UTC+2 (CEST)
- LAU 2: LU0000303
- Website: hesperange.lu

Hesperange (French pronunciation: [ɛspəʁɑ̃ʒ]; Luxembourgish: Hesper [ˈhæspɐ]; German: Hesperingen [ˈhɛspəʁɪŋən]) is a commune and town in southern Luxembourg. It is located south-east of Luxembourg City.

The total population of the commune is 16,443 as of 2023, making it the seventh-most populous in the country.

As of September 2026, the town of Hesperange, which lies in the centre of the commune, has a population of 3,032. Other towns within the commune include Alzingen, Fentange, Howald, and Itzig. Each of these five towns has a population of over 1,000, making Hesperange unique amongst Luxembourgish communes in having five towns with over a thousand inhabitants (see: List of towns in Luxembourg by population).

Hesperange Castle, now a ruin, has a history dating from the 13th century.

Hesperange has a park called Hesper Park which has a memorial commemorating the death of three American soldiers who died in a tank accident on the nearby bridge over the Alzette river on 26 December 1944 during the Battle of the Bulge.

== Population ==
Historical population

Year	Pop.	±%
1821	1,449	—
1851	1,946	+34.3%
1900	2,299	+18.1%
1910	2,516	+9.4%
1922	2,550	+1.4%
1935	3,037	+19.1%

Year	Pop.	±%
1947	3,218	+6.0%
1960	3,883	+20.7%
1970	6,293	+62.1%
1981	9,090	+44.4%
1990	9,702	+6.7%
2000	10,427	+7.5%

Year	Pop.	±%
2005	11,533	+10.6%
2010	13,163	+14.1%
2015	14,393	+9.3%
2020	15,584	+8.3%
2021	15,657	+0.5%

Source data

== Notable people ==
- Albert Bousser (1906–1995), a Luxembourgish politician, railway inspector, trade unionist and Mayor of Hesperange
- Roger Manderscheid (1933 in Itzig – 2010), a writer, won the Batty Weber Prize in 1990
- Vicky Krieps (born 1983), a Luxembourgish-German actress

== Twin towns ==
Hesperange is twinned with:

- Malchin, Germany
- Szerencs, Hungary

== Sports ==
Hesperange is home of FC Swift Hesperange, a football club that plays in the top-flight National Division. The club's home games are played at Stade Alphonse Theis. They have won the Luxembourg National Division on one occasion (2022–23) and the Luxembourg Cup, also on one occasion (1989–90).

== Gallery ==
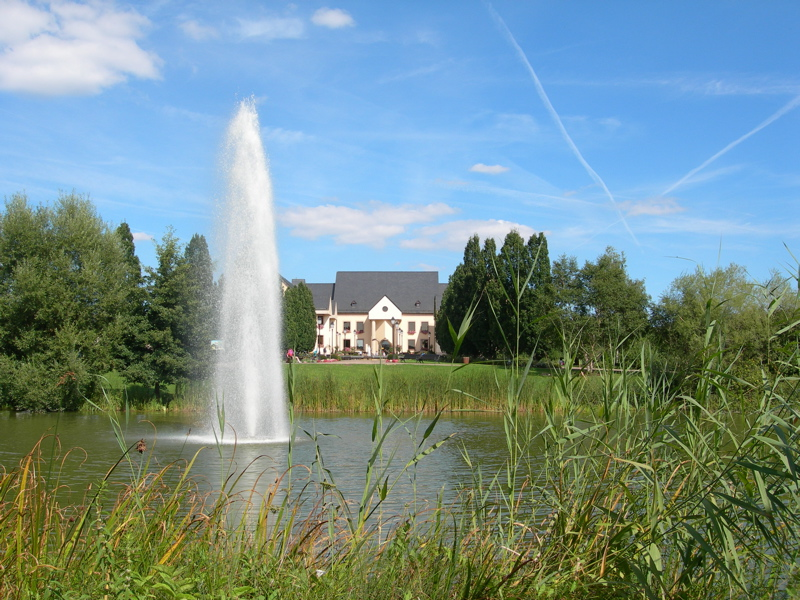
Municipality Building

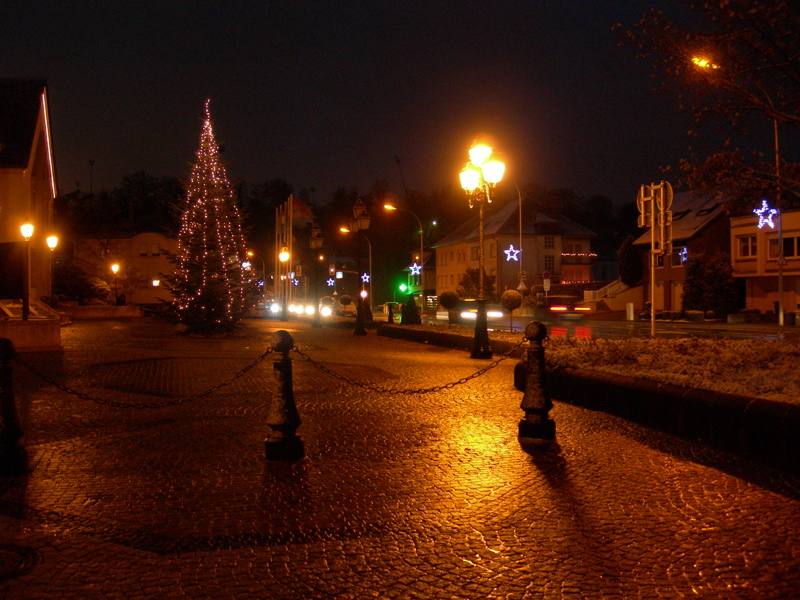
Hesperange at Night

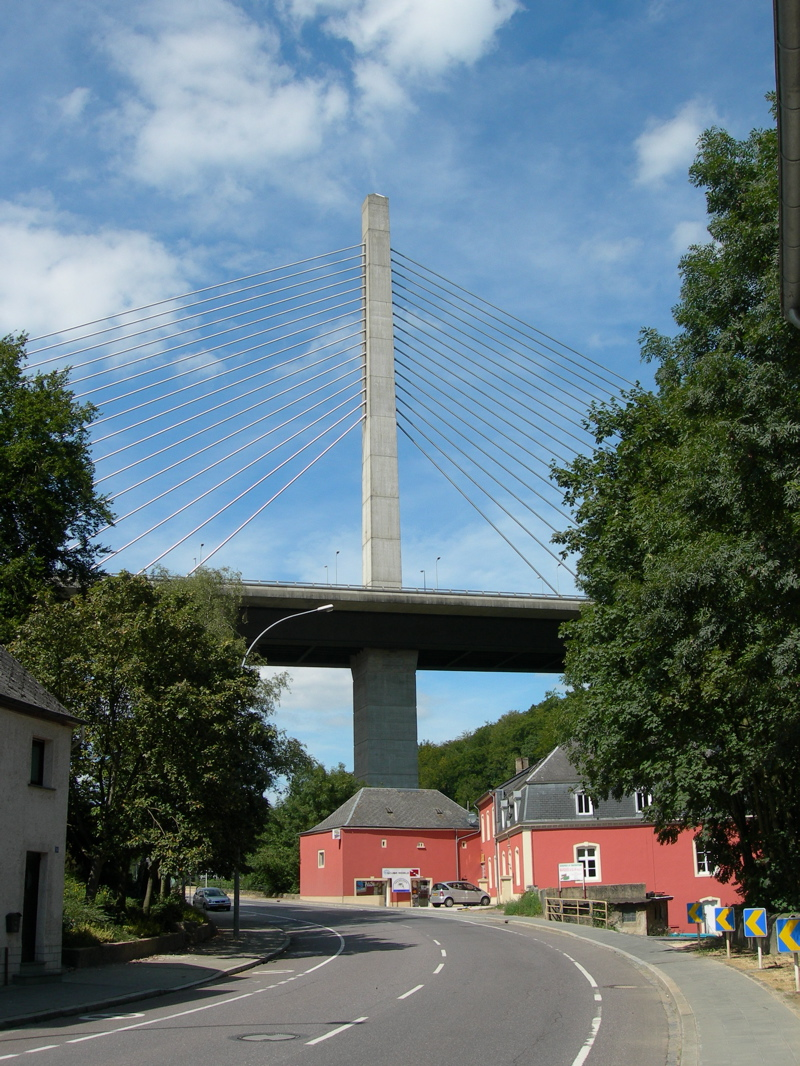
Highway Bridge

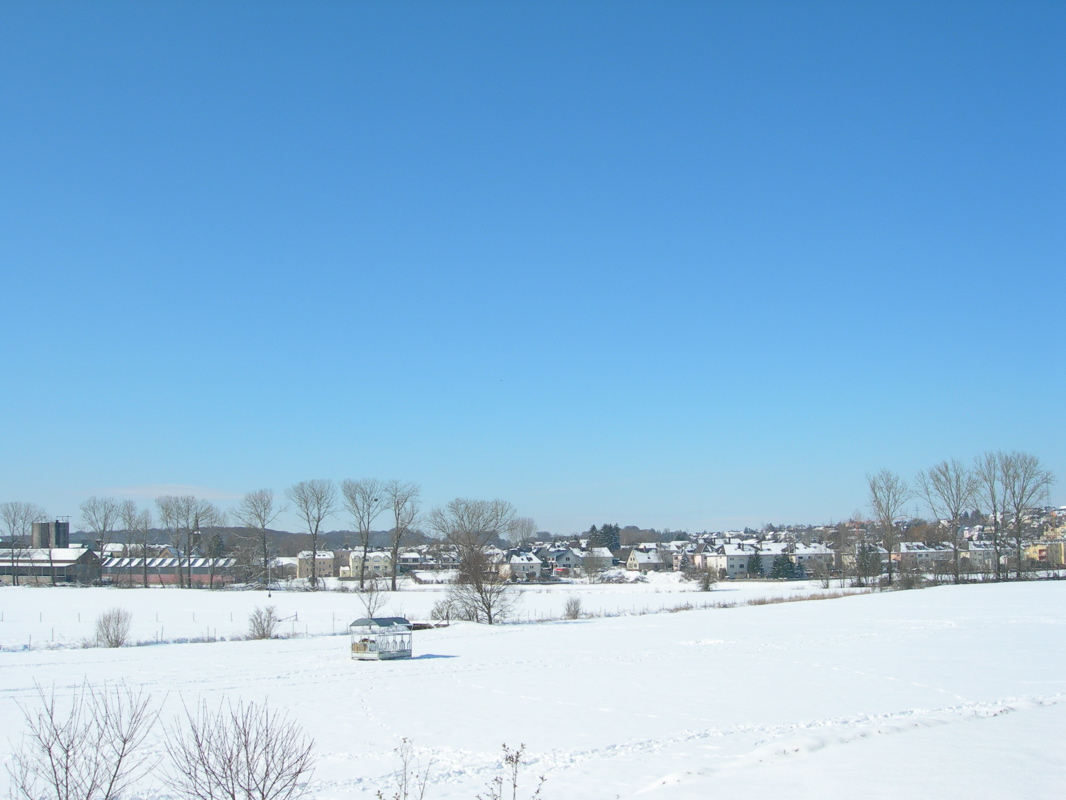
Winter Fields
