= Luxembourg national football team results (1910–1959) =

- Win Draw Loss

This is a list of the Luxembourg national football team results from 1910 to 1959.

== 1910s ==
29 October 1911 Friendly	Luxembourg	1–4	France	Luxembourg
	Elter 15'	Report	Viallemonteil 26'; Mesnier 32', 80' (pen.); Gravier 85'	Stadium: Stade Achille Hammerel; Attendance: 4,000; Referee: Raphaël van Praag (Belgium)

20 April 1913 Friendly	France	8–0	Luxembourg	Saint-Ouen, France
	Maës 28', 56', 68', 86', 88'; Poullain 30'; Romano 78'; Ducret 83'	Report		Stadium: Stade de Paris; Attendance: 3,000; Referee: Alphonse Istace (Belgium)

8 February 1914 Friendly	Luxembourg	5–4	France	Luxembourg
	Massard 4' (pen.), 24', 46', 47'; Bernard 47'	Report	Bard 13'; Ducret 15' (pen.); Geronimi 41'; Triboulet 41'	Stadium: Stade Achille Hammerel; Attendance: 5,000; Referee: Maurice Goossens (Belgium)

== 1920s ==
28 August 1920 1920 Olympics first round	Netherlands	3–0	Luxembourg	Brussels
	J. Bulder 30'; Groosjohan 47', 85'	Report		Stadium: La Butte; Attendance: 3,000; Referee: Georges Hubrecht (Belgium)

29 May 1924 1924 Olympics second round	Italy	2–0	Luxembourg	Paris, France
	Baloncieri 20'; Della Valle 38'	Report		Stadium: Stade Pershing; Attendance: 4,254; Referee: Jean Ricard (France)

21 May 1927 Friendly	Luxembourg	2–5	England	Luxembourg
	Hubert 12'; Lefèvre 13'	Report	Dean 18', 63', 72'; Kelly 35'; Bishop 86'	Stadium: Esch-sur-Alzette, Luxembourg; Attendance: 3,789; Referee: Paul Putz (Belgium)

27 May 1928 1928 Olympics first round	Belgium	5–3	Luxembourg	Amsterdam, Netherlands
	R. Braine 9', 72'; Versijp 20'; Moeschal 23', 67'	Report	Schütz 31'; Weisgerber 42'; Theissen 44'	Stadium: Olympic Stadium (Amsterdam); Attendance: 5,834; Referee: Lorenzo Martínez (Argentina)

28 June 1928 Friendly	Luxembourg	1–1	Egypt	Esch-sur-Alzette, Luxembourg
	Theissen 52'	Report; Report; Report	Houda 12'	Stadium: Stade de la Frontière; Attendance: 4,000; Referee: Georges Balway (France)

== 1930s ==
11 March 1934 1934 FIFA World Cup qualification	Luxembourg	1–9	Germany	Luxembourg City, Luxembourg
	Mengel 27'	Report	Rasselnberg 2', 35', 57', 89'; Wigold 12'; Albrecht 24'; Hohmann 30', 52', 53'	Stadium: Stade Municipal; Attendance: 14,500; Referee: Jan de Wolf (Netherlands)

15 April 1934 1934 FIFA World Cup qualification	Luxembourg	1–6	France	Luxembourg City, Luxembourg
	Speicher 47'	Report	Aston 3'; Nicolas 26', 67', 85', 89' (pen.); Liberati 80'	Stadium: Stade Municipal; Attendance: 18,000; Referee: Marc Turfkruyer (Belgium)

18 August 1935 Friendly	Luxembourg	0–1	Germany	Luxembourg City, Luxembourg
		Report	Günther 43'	Stadium: Stade Municipal; Attendance: 16,000; Referee: Louis Baert (Belgium)

9 May 1936 Friendly	Luxembourg	1–5	Republic of Ireland	Luxembourg City, Luxembourg
	Mart 59' (pen.)	Report	Dunne 9', 86'; Donnelly 65'; Kelly 71', 87'	Stadium: Stade Municipal; Attendance: 8,000; Referee: Peco Bauwens (Germany)

4 August 1936 1936 Olympics first round	Germany	9–0	Luxembourg	Berlin, Germany
	Urban 16' 54' 75'; Simetsreiter 32' 48' 74'; Gauchel 49' 89'; Elbern 76'	Report		Stadium: Poststadion; Attendance: 12,000; Referee: Pál von Hertzka (Hungary)

27 September 1936 Friendly	Germany	7–2	Luxembourg	Krefeld, Germany
	Kuzorra 7', 79'; Malecki 21'; Poertgen 44', 51', 55'; Günther 71'	Report	Kemp 10', 24'	Stadium: Grotenburg-Stadion; Attendance: 18,000; Referee: Joop van Moorsel (Netherlands)

21 March 1937 Friendly	Luxembourg	2–3	Germany	Luxembourg City, Luxembourg
	Stamet 72'; Kemp 77'	Report	Poertgen 7'; Striebinger 59', 68'	Stadium: Stade Municipal; Attendance: 12,000; Referee: Karl Wunderlin (Switzerland)

28 November 1937 1938 FIFA World Cup qualification	Netherlands	4–0	Luxembourg	Rotterdam, Netherlands
	Smit 29' de Boer 68', 78', 82'	Report		Stadium: Stadion Feyenoord; Attendance: 40,000; Referee: Karl Weingarter (Austria)

16 January 1938 Friendly	Luxembourg	0–6	Hungary	Luxembourg City, Luxembourg
		Report	Lajos 13', 59', 82'; Lipót 73'; Gyula 75' (pen.); István 80'	Stadium: Stade Municipal; Attendance: 4,500; Referee: Peco Bauwens (Germany)

13 March 1938 1938 FIFA World Cup qualification	Luxembourg	2–3	Belgium	Luxembourg City, Luxembourg
	Libar 4'; Kemp 33'	Report	Voorhoof 19'; Braine 55' de Vries 59'	Stadium: Stade Municipal; Attendance: 11,200; Referee: Georges Capdeville (France)

20 March 1938 Friendly	Germany	2–1	Luxembourg	Wuppertal, Germany
	Gauchel 6' (pen.), 75'	Report	Libar 73'	Stadium: Stadion am Zoo; Attendance: 20,000; Referee: Hans Wüthrich (Switzerland)

26 March 1939 Friendly	Luxembourg	2–1	Germany	Differdange, Luxembourg
	Mart 20', 87'	Report	Hänel 1'	Stadium: Stade du Thillenberg; Attendance: 4,100; Referee: R. Charlier (Belgium)

== 1940s ==
31 March 1940 Friendly	Netherlands	4–5	Luxembourg	Rotterdam, Netherlands
	Lenstra 10'; Paauwe 23'; Drok 68'; Bergman 80'	Report	Kemp 15', 41'; Mengel 19'; Feller 58'; Everard 77'	Stadium: De Kuip; Attendance: 32,000; Referee: E Swillen

13 May 1945 Friendly	Luxembourg	4–1	Belgium	Luxembourg City, Luxembourg
	Mart 5', 46'; Libar 39'; Kemp 71'	Report	Gillaux 86'	Stadium: Stade Municipal; Attendance: 12,000; Referee: Charles de la Salle (France)

23 February 1946 Friendly	Belgium	7–0	Luxembourg	Charleroi, Belgium
	de Cleyn 3', 29', 48', 64', 89'; Coppens 32'; Lemberechts 62'	Report		Stadium: Stade du Mambourg; Attendance: 15,809; Referee: Victor Sdez (France)

10 March 1946 Friendly	Luxembourg	2–6	Netherlands	Luxembourg City, Luxembourg
	Lahure 8'; Feller 89'	Report; Report	Wilkes 5', 12', 30', 69'; Rijvers 47'; Bergman 49'	Stadium: Stade Municipal; Attendance: 12,000; Referee: Antoine Jorssen (Belgium)

28 July 1946 Friendly	Luxembourg	3–2	Norway	Luxembourg City, Luxembourg
	Schumacher 60', 66'; Pauly 70'	Report	Johannessen 30'; Dahlen 82'	Stadium: Stade Municipal; Attendance: 9,000; Referee: Laurent Franken (Belgium)

24 May 1947 Friendly	Luxembourg	0–6	Scotland	Luxembourg City, Luxembourg
		Report	Flavell 6', 69'; Steel 13', 48'; McLaren 60', 86'	Stadium: Stade Municipal; Attendance: 4,000; Referee: Jean Wouters (Belgium)

26 July 1948 1948 Olympics preliminary round	Luxembourg	6–0	Afghanistan	Hove, England
	Gales 6', 79'; Kettel 40'; Schammel 41'; Paulus 62', 80'	Report		Stadium: Goldstone Ground; Attendance: 5,000; Referee: A.C. Williams (Great Britain)

31 July 1948 1948 Olympics first round	Yugoslavia	6–1	Luxembourg	Fulham, England
	Stanković 57'; Mihajlović 61'; Željko Čajkovski 65' 70'; Mitić 74'; Bobek 87'	Report	Schammel 10'	Stadium: Craven Cottage; Attendance: 7,000; Referee: Karel van der Meer (Netherlands)

23 March 1949 Friendly	Czechoslovakia	2–2	Luxembourg	Bratislava, Slovakia
	Hemele 3', 71'	Report	Paulus 62'; Letsch 63'	Stadium: Tehelné pole Attendance: 20,000; Referee: Władysław Michalik (Poland)

26 June 1949 1950 FIFA World Cup qualification	Switzerland	5–2	Luxembourg	Zürich, Switzerland
	Maillard 20'; Fatton 30' 41'; Ballaman 48'; Antenen 59'	Report	Wagner 3'; Reuter 88'	Stadium: Hardturm; Attendance: 15,000; Referee: Charles Delasalle (France)

18 September 1949 1950 FIFA World Cup qualification	Luxembourg	2–3	Switzerland	Luxembourg City, Luxembourg
	Müller 3'; Kremer 38'	Report	Maillard 1'; Friedländer 59'; Fatton 75'	Stadium: Stade Municipal; Attendance: 3,000; Referee: Pierre Theunen (Belgium)

== 1950s ==
15 August 1950 Friendly	Norway	2–2	Luxembourg	Bergen, Norway
	Thoresen 60'; Andersen 78'	Report	Letsch 6'; Müller 59'	Stadium: Brann Stadion; Attendance: 16,000; Referee: Ernst Hansen, (Denmark)

4 November 1951 Friendly	Luxembourg	3–0	Finland	Luxembourg City, Luxembourg
	Müller 11'; Pylkkönen 15' (o.g.); Nurenberg 88'	Report		Stadium: Stade Municipal; Attendance: 10,000; Referee: Klaas Schipper (Netherlands)

23 December 1951 Friendly	West Germany	4–1	Luxembourg	Essen, Germany
	Termath 14', 63'; Stollenwerk 54'; Rahn 68'	Report	Müller 84'	Stadium: Uhlenkrugstadion; Attendance: 40,000; Referee: Louis Baert (Belgium)

20 April 1952 Friendly	Luxembourg	0–3	West Germany	Luxembourg City, Luxembourg
		Report	Stollenwerk 9'; Zeitler 60'; Klodt 88'	Stadium: Stade Municipal; Attendance: 17,000; Referee: Henri Bauwens (Belgium)

16 July 1952 1952 Olympics Preliminary round	Luxembourg	5–3 (a.e.t.)	Great Britain	Lahti, Finland
12:00	Roller 60', 95', 97'; Letsch 91'; Gales 102'	Report	Robb 12'; Slater 101'; Lewis 118'	Stadium: Lahden kisapuisto Attendance: 3,656; Referee: Vincenzo Orlandini (Italy)

20 July 1952 1952 Olympics Preliminary round	Brazil	2–1	Luxembourg	Kotka, Finland
12:00	Larry 42'; Humberto 49'	Report	Gales 86'	Stadium: Kotkan Urheilukeskus; Attendance: 6,776; Referee: Marijan Matancic (Yugoslavia)

20 September 1953 1958 FIFA World Cup qualification	Luxembourg	1–6	France	Luxembourg City, Luxembourg
	Kohn 6'	Report	Piantoni 5'; Kopa 10'; Cicci 41'; Glovacki 42'; Kargu 73'; Flamion 88'	Stadium: Stade Municipal; Attendance: 15,000; Referee: Ernst Dörflinger (Switzerland)

28 October 1953 1958 FIFA World Cup qualification	Republic of Ireland	4–0	Luxembourg	Dublin, Republic of Ireland
	Fitzsimons 14' 83'; Ryan 48' (pen.); Eglington 59'	Report		Stadium: Dalymount Park; Attendance: 20,000; Referee: Alf Bond (England)

17 December 1953 1954 FIFA World Cup qualification	France	8–0	Luxembourg	Paris, France
	Desgranges 2', 88'; Vincent 6', 10'; Fontaine 21', 75', 80'; Foix 57'	Report		Stadium: Parc des Princes; Attendance: 20,146; Referee: F Roeykens (Belgium)

7 March 1954 1954 FIFA World Cup qualification	Luxembourg	0–1	Republic of Ireland	Luxembourg City, Luxembourg
		Report	Cummins 67'	Stadium: Stade Municipal; Attendance: 3,000; Referee: Bertus Aussum (Netherlands)

30 September 1956 1958 FIFA World Cup qualification	Austria	7–0	Luxembourg	Vienna, Austria
	Hanappi 18' 25'; Walzhofer 51'; Wagner 62' 77'; Kozlicek 71'; Haummer 79'	Report		Stadium: Praterstadion; Attendance: 47,000; Referee: Francesco Liverani (Italy)

10 March 1957 Friendly	East Germany	3–0	Luxembourg	Berlin, Germany
	Wirth 2'; Schröter 30'; Tröger 42'	Report		Stadium: Stadion der Weltjugend; Attendance: 40,000; Referee: Alojz Obtulovič (Czechoslovakia)

20 March 1957 1958 FIFA World Cup qualification	Netherlands	4–1	Luxembourg	Rotterdam, Netherlands
	Van der Gijp 27' 30'; Dillen 72'; Brusselers 80'	Report	Halsdorf 34'	Stadium: De Kuip; Attendance: 58,000; Referee: Werner Treichel (West Germany)

11 September 1957 1958 FIFA World Cup qualification	Netherlands	5–2	Luxembourg	Rotterdam, Netherlands
	Lenstra 15' 28'; Wilkes 26'; Van Melis 35'; Rijvers 54'	Report	Fiedler 5'; Letsch 58'	Stadium: De Kuip; Attendance: 55,000; Referee: Archie Murdoch (England)

29 September 1957 1958 FIFA World Cup qualification	Luxembourg	0–3	Austria	Luxembourg City, Luxembourg
		Report	Dienst 19'; Buzek 47'; Senekowitsch 66'	Stadium: Stade Municipal; Attendance: 2,000; Referee: Gérard Versyp (Belgium)

17 June 1959 Friendly	Norway	1–0	Luxembourg	Oslo, Norway
	Hennum 41'	Report		Stadium: Ullevaal Stadion; Attendance: 24,571; Referee: Valdemar Hansen (Denmark)

11 November 1959 1960 Olympics Qualification	France	1–0	Luxembourg	Dijon, France
14:30 UTC+1	Quédec 37'	Report		Stadium: Parc des Sports; Attendance: 3,800; Referee: Antonio Moriconi (Italy)
