= Football at the 1952 Summer Olympics =

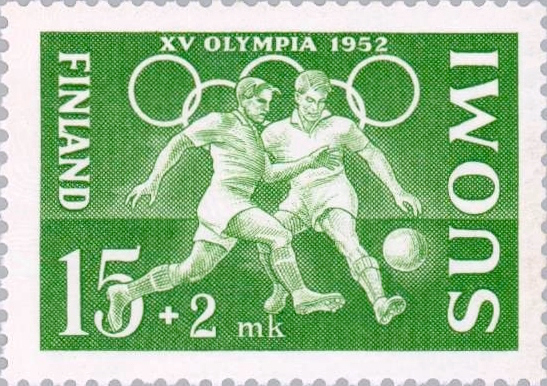

Tournament details
- Host country: Finland
- Dates: 15 July – 2 August 1952
- Teams: 25 (from 5 confederations)
- Venues: 6 (in 5 host cities)

Final positions
- Champions: Hungary (1st title)
- Runners-up: Yugoslavia
- Third place: Sweden
- Fourth place: West Germany

Tournament statistics
- Matches played: 26
- Goals scored: 135 (5.19 per match)

The Football tournament at the 1952 Summer Olympics was won by Hungary.

The games signalled the arrival (to Western Europeans at least) of the Hungarian national football team – the "Magical Magyars". Ferenc Puskás later said of the 1952 competition: "It was during the Olympics that our football first started to flow with real power." It was during the Games that Stanley Rous of English Football Association invited the Hungarians to play a friendly at Wembley the following year.

== Venues ==
| Helsinki | Football at the 1952 Summer Olympics is located in Finland | Kotka |
|---|---|---|
| Olympic Stadium | Football at the 1952 Summer Olympics is located in Finland | Kotkan urheilukeskus |
| Capacity: 70,470 | Football at the 1952 Summer Olympics is located in Finland | Capacity: 11,400 |
| Helsinki | Football at the 1952 Summer Olympics is located in Finland | Lahti |
| Töölön Pallokenttä | Football at the 1952 Summer Olympics is located in Finland | Lahden kisapuisto |
| Capacity: 18,050 | Football at the 1952 Summer Olympics is located in Finland | Capacity: 8,067 |
| Tampere | Football at the 1952 Summer Olympics is located in Finland | Turku |
| Ratina Stadion | Football at the 1952 Summer Olympics is located in Finland | Kupittaan jalkapallostadion |
| Capacity: 20,700 | Football at the 1952 Summer Olympics is located in Finland | Capacity: 14,224 |

== Participating nations ==
- Austria (20)
- Brazil (21)
- Bulgaria (20)
- Chile (16)
- Denmark (20)
- Egypt (20)
- Finland (19)
- France (18)
- Germany (20)
- Great Britain (20)
- Greece (18)
- Hungary (22)
- India (19)
- Italy (20)
- Luxembourg (17)
- Netherlands (20)
- Netherlands Antilles (20)
- Norway (20)
- Poland (17)
- Romania (20)
- Soviet Union (20)
- Sweden (22)
- Turkey (18)
- United States (17)
- Yugoslavia (20)

== Final tournament ==
=== Preliminary round ===
The preliminary round saw Hungary record a narrow victory against Romania, whilst there was an 8–0 victory for Italy against the United States, and a 5–1 victory for Brazil against The Netherlands. Great Britain succumbed to Luxembourg 5–3, whilst Egypt defeated Chile 5–4. Yugoslavia were drawn against the Indians and won 10–1.

15 July 1952
19:00

| Poland | 2–1 | France |
|---|---|---|
| Trampisz 31'; Krasówka 49' | Report | Leblond 30' |

Lahden kisapuisto, Lahti
Attendance: 3,752
Referee: Karel van der Meer (NED)

15 July 1952
19:00

| Hungary | 2–1 | Romania |
|---|---|---|
| Czibor 21'; Kocsis 73' | Report | Suru 86' |

Kupittaa, Turku
Attendance: 10,588
Referee: Nikolay Latyshev (URS)

15 July 1952
19:00

| Yugoslavia | 10–1 | India |
|---|---|---|
| Vukas 2', 62'; Mitić 14', 43'; Zebec 17', 23', 60', 87'; Ognjanov 52', 67' | Report | Ahmed Khan 89' |

Töölön Pallokenttä, Helsinki
Attendance: 10,000
Referee: John Best (USA)

15 July 1952
19:00

| Denmark | 2–1 | Greece |
|---|---|---|
| P.E. Petersen 36', 37' | Report | Emmanouilidis 85' |

Ratina Stadion, Tampere
Attendance: 4,372
Referee: Waldemar Karni (FIN)

15 July 1952
19:00

| Soviet Union | 2–1 (a.e.t.) | Bulgaria |
|---|---|---|
| Bobrov 100'; Trofimov 104' | Report | Kolev 95' |

Kotkan Urheilukeskus, Kotka
Attendance: 10,637
Referee: Istvan Zsolt (HUN)

16 July 1952
19:00

| Italy | 8–0 | United States |
|---|---|---|
| Gimona 3', 51', 75'; Pandolfini 16', 62'; Venturi 27'; Fontanesi 52'; Mariani 87' | Report |

Ratina Stadion, Tampere
Attendance: 15,342
Referee: Arthur Ellis (GBR)

16 July 1952
19:00

| Brazil | 5–1 | Netherlands |
|---|---|---|
| Humberto 25'; Larry 33' (pen.), 36'; Jansen 81'; Vavá 86' | Report | Van Roessel 15' |

Kupittaa, Turku
Attendance: 9,685
Referee: Giorgio Bernardi (ITA)

16 July 1952
12:00

| Luxembourg | 5–3 (a.e.t.) | Great Britain |
|---|---|---|
| Roller 60', 95', 97'; Letsch 91'; Gales 102' | Report | Robb 12'; Slater 101'; Lewis 118' |

Lahden kisapuisto, Lahti
Attendance: 3,656
Referee: Vincenzo Orlandini (ITA)

16 July 1952
19:00

| Egypt | 5–4 | Chile |
|---|---|---|
| Elfar 27'; Ahmed Mekawi 43'; Eldizwi 66', 75', 80' | Report | Jara 7', 78'; Vial 14', 88' |

Kotkan Urheilukeskus, Kotka
Attendance: 5,354
Referee: John Nilsson (SWE)

=== First round ===
The first round saw Scandinavian countries join the competition; Austria, the Netherlands Antilles, Turkey and West Germany also received byes. Hosts Finland were beaten 3–4 by Austria, whilst Sweden defeated neighbours Norway 4–1. The game of the round was between Yugoslavia and the Soviet Union; Yugoslavia had been 5–1 ahead with 30 minutes of the match to go, only for the Soviet captain Bobrov to score a hat-trick and inspire his team to an eventual 5–5 draw. A replay resulted in a 3–1 victory for Yugoslavia; the Soviet side had been expected by Moscow to win the 1952 Games, and their defeat by Yugoslavia was not mentioned in the Soviet press until after Stalin's death the following year.

19 July 1952
19:00

| Finland | 3–4 | Austria |
|---|---|---|
| Stolpe 11', 34'; Rytkönen 36' | Report | Gollnhuber 8' (pen.), 30'; Stumpf 59'; Grohs 79' |

Olympic Stadium, Helsinki
Attendance: 33,053
Referee: William Ling (GBR)

20 July 1952
19:00

| Brazil | 2–1 | Luxembourg |
|---|---|---|
| Larry 42'; Humberto 49' | Report | Gales 86' |

Kotkan Urheilukeskus, Kotka
Attendance: 6,776
Referee: Marijan Matancic (YUG)

20 July 1952
19:00

| Yugoslavia | 5–5 (a.e.t.) | Soviet Union |
|---|---|---|
| Mitić 29'; Ognjanov 33'; Zebec 44', 59'; Bobek 46' | Report | Bobrov 53', 77', 87'; Trofimov 75'; Petrov 89' |

Ratina Stadion, Tampere
Attendance: 17,000
Referee: Arthur Ellis (GBR)
22 July 1952
19:00

| Yugoslavia | 3–1 | Soviet Union |
|---|---|---|
| Mitić 19'; Bobek 29' (pen.); Čajkovski 54' | Report | Bobrov 6' |

Ratina Stadion, Tampere
Attendance: 16,916
Referee: Arthur Ellis (GBR)

20 July 1952
12:00

| West Germany | 3–1 | Egypt |
|---|---|---|
| Klug 33'; Schröder 38', 61' | Report | El-Dizwi 64' |

Kupittaa, Turku
Attendance: 6,813
Referee: Giorgio Bernardi (ITA)

21 July 1952
19:00

| Denmark | 2–0 | Poland |
|---|---|---|
| Seebach 17'; S. Nielsen 69' | Report |

Kupittaa, Turku
Attendance: 6,024
Referee: Folke Bålstad (NOR)

21 July 1952
19:00

| Sweden | 4–1 | Norway |
|---|---|---|
| Brodd 23', 35'; Rydell 81'; Bengtsson 89' | Report | Sørensen 83' |

Ratina Stadion, Tampere
Attendance: 4,072
Referee: Johan Aksel Alho (FIN)

21 July 1952
19:00

| Hungary | 3–0 | Italy |
|---|---|---|
| Palotás 11', 20'; Kocsis 83' | Report |

Töölön Pallokenttä, Helsinki
Attendance: 13,870
Referee: Karel van der Meer (NED)

21 July 1952
19:00

| Turkey | 2–1 | Netherlands Antilles |
|---|---|---|
| Tokaç 9'; Bilge 76' (pen.) | Report | Briezen 79' |

Lahden kisapuisto, Lahti
Attendance: 3,696
Referee: Carl Jorgensen (DEN)

=== Quarterfinals ===
Sweden defeated Austria to ensure a Scandinavian presence in the semifinals. Germany surprisingly beat Brazil 4–2 after extra time, whilst Yugoslavia won comfortably in a 5–3 defeat of Denmark. Hungary demolished Turkey 7–1 to complete the four semifinalists.

23 July 1952
19:00

| Sweden | 3–1 | Austria |
|---|---|---|
| Sandberg 80'; Brodd 85'; Rydell 87' | Report | Grohs 40' |

Töölön Pallokenttä, Helsinki
Attendance: 12,564
Referee: Vincenzo Orlandini (ITA)

24 July 1952
12:00

| West Germany | 4–2 (a.e.t.) | Brazil |
|---|---|---|
| Schröder 75', 96'; Klug 89'; Zeitler 120' | Report | Larry 12'; Zózimo 74' |

Töölön Pallokenttä, Helsinki
Attendance: 11,451
Referee: Arthur Ellis (GBR)

24 July 1952
19:00

| Hungary | 7–1 | Turkey |
|---|---|---|
| Palotás 18'; Kocsis 32', 90'; Lantos 48'; Puskás 54', 72'; Bozsik 70' | Report | Guder 57' |

Kotkan Urheilukeskus, Kotka
Attendance: 4,743
Referee: Waldemar Karni (FIN)

25 July 1952
19:00

| Yugoslavia | 5–3 | Denmark |
|---|---|---|
| Čajkovski 19'; Ognjanov 35'; Vukas 41'; Bobek 78'; Zebec 81' | Report | Lundberg 63'; Seebach 85'; Hansen 87' |

Töölön Pallokenttä, Helsinki
Attendance: 11,456
Referee: Waldemar Karni (FIN)

=== Semifinals ===
In the first semifinal, Hungary saw off Sweden with a comprehensive 6–0 victory, whilst Yugoslavia beat Germany 3–1 to set up a Hungary-Yugoslavia final.

28 July 1952
19:00

| Hungary | 6–0 | Sweden |
|---|---|---|
| Puskás 1'; Palotás 16'; Lindh 36' (o.g.); Kocsis 65', 69'; Hidegkuti 67' | Report |

Olympic Stadium, Helsinki
Attendance: 30,471
Referee: William Ling (GBR)

29 July 1952
19:00

| Yugoslavia | 3–1 | West Germany |
|---|---|---|
| Mitić 3', 24'; Čajkovski 30' | Report | Stollenwerk 12' |

Olympic Stadium, Helsinki
Attendance: 25,821
Referee: Wolf Waldemar Karni (FIN)

=== Bronze-medal match ===
There was some consolation for the Scandinavian countries as Sweden defeated Germany 2–0 in the third place play-off to secure the bronze medal.

1 August 1952
19:00

| Sweden | 2–0 | West Germany |
|---|---|---|
| Rydell 11'; Löfgren 86' | Report |

Olympic Stadium, Helsinki
Attendance: 28,470
Referee: Vincenzo Orlandini (ITA)

=== Gold-medal match ===
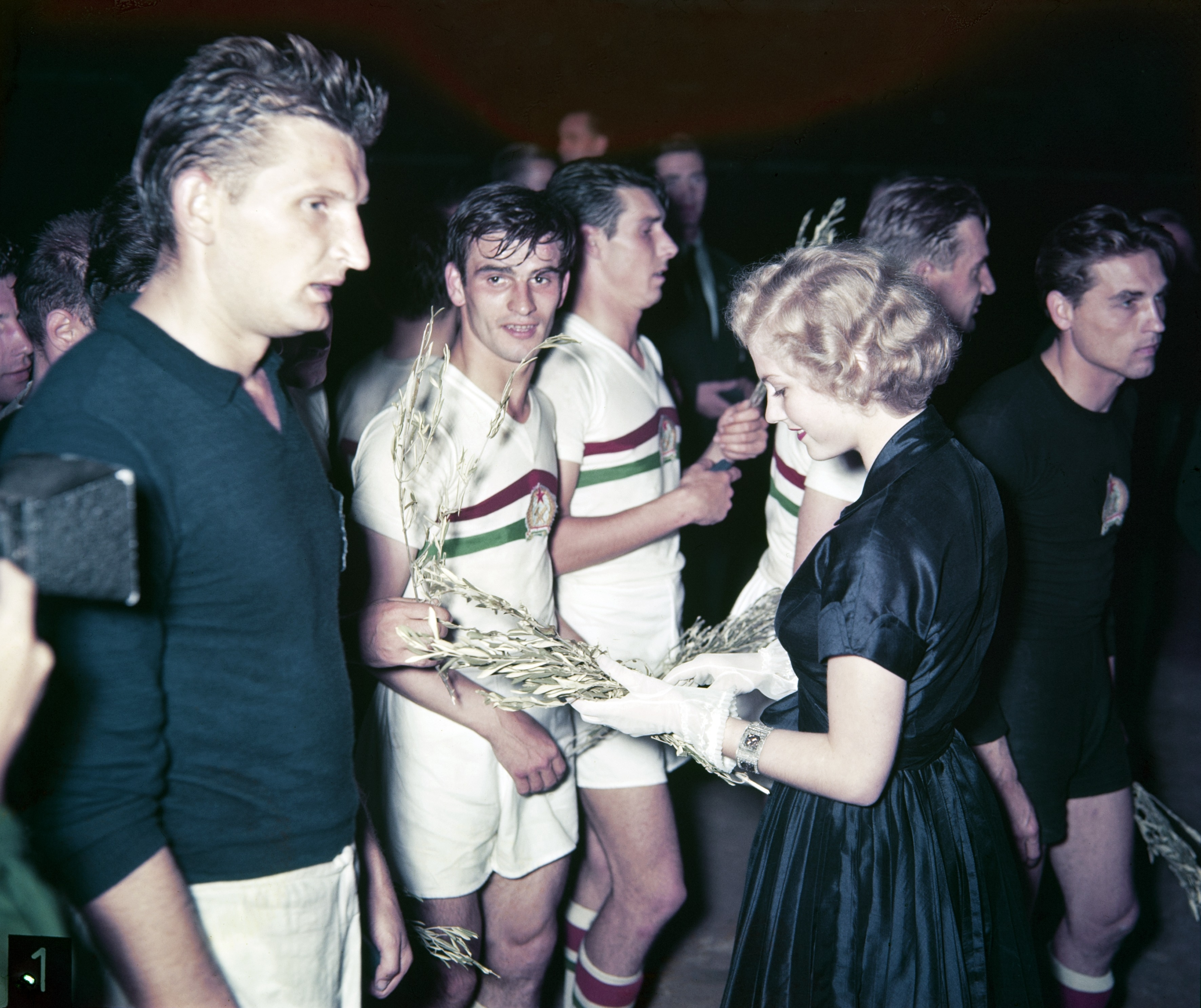
1952 Miss Universe Armi Kuusela awarding the Hungarian team

Two goals from Puskás and Zoltán Czibor saw Hungary beat Yugoslavia and take the gold medal.

1952 Summer Olympics Football Final
2 August 1952
19:00

| Hungary | 2–0 | Yugoslavia |
|---|---|---|
| Puskás 70'; Czibor 88' | Report |

Olympic Stadium, Helsinki
Attendance: 58,553
Referee: Arthur Ellis (GBR)

Team details

Hungary
Yugoslavia

| GK | Gyula Grosics |
| RB | Jenő Buzánszky |
| CB | Gyula Lóránt |
| LB | Mihály Lantos |
| RH | József Bozsik |
| LH | József Zakariás |
| OR | Nándor Hidegkuti |
| IR | Sándor Kocsis |
| SS | Péter Palotás |
| IL | Ferenc Puskás |
| OL | Zoltán Czibor |
Manager:
Gusztáv Sebes

| GK | Vladimir Beara |
| RB | Branko Stanković |
| CH | Ivan Horvat |
| LB | Tomislav Crnković |
| RH | Zlatko Čajkovski |
| LH | Vujadin Boškov |
| OR | Tihomir Ognjanov |
| IR | Rajko Mitić |
| CF | Bernard Vukas |
| IL | Stjepan Bobek |
| OL | Branko Zebec |
Manager:
Milorad Arsenijević

== Bracket ==
First Round
Hungary | 3
Italy | 0
Turkey | 2
Netherlands Antilles | 1
Sweden | 4
Norway | 1
Finland | 3
Austria | 4
Denmark | 2
Poland | 0
Yugoslavia | 5 (3)
Soviet Union | 5 (1)
Luxembourg | 1
Brazil | 2
West Germany | 3
Egypt | 1

Quarterfinals
Hungary | 7
Turkey | 1
Sweden | 3
Austria | 1
Denmark | 3
Yugoslavia | 5
Brazil | 2
West Germany (a.e.t.) | 4

Semifinals
Hungary | 6
Sweden | 0
Yugoslavia | 3
West Germany | 1

Finals
Hungary | 2
Yugoslavia | 0

== Medalists ==
| Gold: | Silver: | Bronze: |
|---|---|---|
| Hungary Gyula Grosics; Jenő Dalnoki; Imre Kovács; László Budai; Ferenc Puskás; Zoltán Czibor; Lajos Csordás; Jenő Buzánszky; Gyula Lóránt; Mihály Lantos; József Bozsik; József Zakariás; Nándor Hidegkuti; Sándor Kocsis; Péter Palotás | Yugoslavia Vladimir Beara; Branko Stanković; Tomislav Crnković; Zlatko Čajkovski; Ivica Horvat; Vujadin Boškov; Tihomir Ognjanov; Rajko Mitić; Bernard Vukas; Stjepan Bobek; Branko Zebec; Dušan Cvetković; Milorad Diskić; Ratko Čolić; Slavko Luštica; Zdravko Rajkov; Vladimir Čonč; Vladimir Firm | Sweden Karl Svensson; Lennart Samuelsson; Erik Nilsson; Holger Hansson; Bengt Gustavsson; Gösta Lindh; Sylve Bengtsson; Gösta Löfgren; Ingvar Rydell; Yngve Brodd; Gösta Sandberg; Olof Åhlund |

== Goalscorers ==
7 goals

- (Socialist Federal Republic of Yugoslavia) Branko Zebec (Yugoslavia)

6 goals

- Sándor Kocsis (Hungary)
- (Socialist Federal Republic of Yugoslavia) Rajko Mitić (Yugoslavia)

5 goals

- Vsevolod Bobrov (Soviet Union)

4 goals

- Larry (Brazil)
- El-Sayed El-Dhizui (Egypt)
- (West Germany) Willi Schröder (Germany)
- Péter Palotás (Hungary)
- Ferenc Puskás (Hungary)
- (Socialist Federal Republic of Yugoslavia) Tihomir Ognjanov (Yugoslavia)

3 goals

- Aredio Gimona (Italy)
- Joseph Roller (Luxembourg)
- Yngve Brodd (Sweden)
- Ingvar Rydell (Sweden)
- (Socialist Federal Republic of Yugoslavia) Stjepan Bobek (Yugoslavia)
- (Socialist Federal Republic of Yugoslavia) Zlatko Čajkovski (Yugoslavia)
- (Socialist Federal Republic of Yugoslavia) Bernard Vukas (Yugoslavia)

2 goals

- Otto Gollnhuber (Austria)
- Herbert Grohs (Austria)
- Humberto Tozzi (Brazil)
- Irenio Jara (Chile)
- Julio Vial (Chile)
- Poul Erik Petersen (Denmark)
- Holger Seebach (Denmark)
- Olof Stolpe (Finland)
- (West Germany) Karl Klug (Germany)
- Zoltán Czibor (Hungary)
- Egisto Pandolfini (Italy)
- Julien Gales (Luxembourg)
- Vasili Trofimov (Soviet Union)

1 goal

- Erich Stumpf (Austria)
- Jansen (Brazil)
- Vavá (Brazil)
- Zózimo (Brazil)
- Ivan Petkov Kolev (Bulgaria)
- Jens Peter Hansen (Denmark)
- Knud Lundberg (Denmark)
- Svend Nielsen (Denmark)
- Khamal Ahmed Elfar (Egypt)
- Mechaury (Egypt)
- Aulis Rytkönen (Finland)
- Michel Leblond (France)
- (West Germany) Georg Stollenwerk (Germany)
- (West Germany) Johann Zeitler (Germany)
- (United Kingdom) Jim Lewis (Great Britain)
- (United Kingdom) George Robb (Great Britain)
- (United Kingdom) Bill Slater (Great Britain)
- Pavlos Emmanouilidis (Greece)
- József Bozsik (Hungary)
- Nándor Hidegkuti (Hungary)
- Mihály Lantos (Hungary)
- Ahmed Khan (India)
- Alberto Fontanesi (Italy)
- Amos Mariani (Italy)
- Arcadio Venturi (Italy)
- Léon Letsch (Luxembourg)
- Joannes van Roesell (Netherlands)
- (Colony of Curaçao and Dependencies) Jan Briezen (Netherlands Antilles)
- Odd Wang Sørensen (Norway)
- Jerzy Krasówka (Poland)
- Kazimierz Trampisz (Poland)
- Ion Suru (Romania)
- Aleksandr Petrov (Soviet Union)
- Sylve Bengtsson (Sweden)
- Gösta Löfgren (Sweden)
- Gösta Sandberg (Sweden)
- Tekin Bilge (Turkey)
- Ercument Guder (Turkey)
- Muzaffer Tokaç (Turkey)

Own goal

- Gösta Lindh (Sweden, against Hungary)

== Soviet Union vs Yugoslavia ==
The first meeting between the Soviet Union and Yugoslavia is still the most famous one. On the political level, the Soviet leader Joseph Stalin and the Yugoslav leader Josip Broz Tito split in 1948, which resulted in Yugoslavia being excluded from the Communist Information Bureau. The origin of the conflict was Tito's refusal to submit to Stalin's interpretations and visions of politics and in process becoming a Soviet satellite state. Before the match, both Tito and Stalin sent telegrams to their national teams, which showed just how important it was for the two head of states. Yugoslavia led 5–1, but a Soviet comeback in the last 15 minutes resulted in a 5–5 draw. The match was replayed, Yugoslavia winning 3–1. The defeat to their archrivals hit Soviet football hard, and after just three games played in the season, CDKA Moscow, who had made up most of the USSR squad, was forced to withdraw from the league by Joseph Stalin and later disbanded. Furthermore, Boris Arkadiev, who coached both USSR and CDKA, was stripped of his Merited Master of Sports of the USSR title.
