= Luxembourg national football team results =

- Win Draw Loss

For lists of Luxembourg national football team results see:

- Luxembourg national football team results (1910–1959)
- Luxembourg national football team results (1960–1979)
- Luxembourg national football team results (1980–1999)
- Luxembourg national football team results (2000–2019)
- Luxembourg national football team results (2020–present)
