= Jules Gales =

Luxembourgish footballer

Personal information
- Date of birth: 13 July 1924
- Place of birth: Bech-Kleinmacher, Luxembourg
- Date of death: 26 May 1988 (aged 63)
- Place of death: Remich, Luxembourg
- Position: Striker

Senior career*
| Years | Team | Apps | (Gls) |
| 1947–48 | AS Remich | | |
| 1948–53 | Spora Luxembourg | | |

International career
| 1948–1952 | Luxembourg | 26 | (11) |
- * Club domestic league appearances and goals

Jules Gales (13 July 1924 – 26 May 1988) was a Luxembourgish footballer. He competed at the 1948 Summer Olympics and the 1952 Summer Olympics.

== Club career ==
Gales spent one season at AS Remich before moving to Spora Luxembourg where he won the National Division and Luxembourg Cup.

== International career ==
Gales made his debut in a friendly match against Austria on 2 May 1948. His final game came at the 1952 Olympics against Brazil.

=== International goals ===
Scores and results list Luxembourg's goal tally first, score column indicates score after each Gales goal.

List of international goals scored by Jules Gales
| No. | Date | Venue | Opponent | Score | Result | Competition |
|---|---|---|---|---|---|---|
| 1 | 26 July 1948 | Goldstone Ground, Brighton | Afghanistan | 1–0 | 6–0 | 1948 Olympics Preliminary round |
| 2 | 26 July 1948 | Goldstone Ground, Brighton | Afghanistan | 5–0 | 6–0 | 1948 Olympics Preliminary round |
| 3 | 19 March 1950 | Stade Municipal, Luxembourg City | Switzerland | 1–0 | 2–0 | Friendly |
| 4 | 19 March 1950 | Stade Municipal, Luxembourg City | Switzerland | 2–0 | 2–0 | Friendly |
| 5 | 16 April 1950 | Stade Municipal, Luxembourg City | Belgium | 1–3 | 2–4 | Friendly |
| 6 | 21 May 1950 | Stade Municipal, Luxembourg City | England | 1–0 | 1–2 | Friendly |
| 7 | 29 October 1950 | Stade Municipal, Luxembourg City | Austria | 1–1 | 1–2 | Friendly |
| 8 | 15 April 1951 | Albert Dyserynck Stadion, Bruges | Belgium | 3–3 | 3–3 | Friendly |
| 9 | 29 June 1952 | Merzig | Saar | 1–0 | 1–6 | Friendly |
| 10 | 16 July 1952 | Lahden kisapuisto, Lahti | Great Britain | 5–2 | 5–3 | 1952 Olympics Preliminary round |
| 11 | 20 July 1952 | Kotkan Urheilukeskus, Kotka | Brazil | 1–2 | 1–2 | 1952 Olympics First round |
