= Arthur Schoos =

Luxembourgish football manager

Personal information
- Full name: Arthur Schoos
- Date of birth: 29 August 1936 (age 90)

Managerial career
- Years: Team
- 1978: Luxembourg
- 1981–1982: Young Boys Diekirch

Arthur Schoos (born 29 August 1936) is a Luxembourgish former football manager. He managed the Luxembourg national football team for two games in 1978. With Marcel Welter he co-managed Young Boys Diekirch in the 1981–1982 season.
