= Jos Roller =

Luxembourgish footballer

Personal information
- Date of birth: 21 August 1929
- Place of birth: Esch-sur-Alzette, Luxembourg
- Date of death: 4 January 1988 (aged 58)
- Place of death: Differdange, Luxembourg
- Position: Midfielder

Senior career*
| Years | Team | Apps | (Gls) |
- Progrès Niederkorn

International career
| 1950–1955 | Luxembourg | 21 | (7) |
- * Club domestic league appearances and goals

Joseph "Jos" Roller (21 August 1929 – 4 January 1988) was a Luxembourgish footballer. He competed in the men's tournament at the 1952 Summer Olympics.
