= Tekin Bilge =

Turkish footballer (1930–2016)

Personal information
- Date of birth: 1930
- Place of birth: Afyonkarahisar, Turkey
- Date of death: 23 August 2016 (aged 85–86)
- Position: Midfielder

International career
Years	Team	Apps	(Gls)
- Turkey

Tekin Bilge (1930 – 23 August 2016) was a Turkish footballer. He competed in the men's tournament at the 1952 Summer Olympics.
