= François Müller =

Luxembourgish footballer

Personal information
- Date of birth: 23 February 1927
- Place of birth: Luxembourg, Luxembourg
- Date of death: 17 September 1999 (aged 72)
- Position: Midfielder

International career
Years	Team	Apps	(Gls)
1949–1955	Luxembourg	27	(12)
1952	Luxembourg Olympic	2	(0)

François Müller (23 February 1927 – 17 September 1999) was a Luxembourgish footballer. He competed in the men's tournament at the 1952 Summer Olympics.
