= Erich Stumpf =

Austrian footballer

Personal information
- Date of birth: 22 May 1927
- Date of death: 1972
- Position: Forward

International career
Years	Team	Apps	(Gls)
- Austria

Erich Stumpf (22 May 1927 – 1972) was an Austrian footballer, who was affiliated with Sturm Graz. He competed in the men's tournament at the 1952 Summer Olympics.
