= Julio Vial =

Chilean footballer (1933-2016)

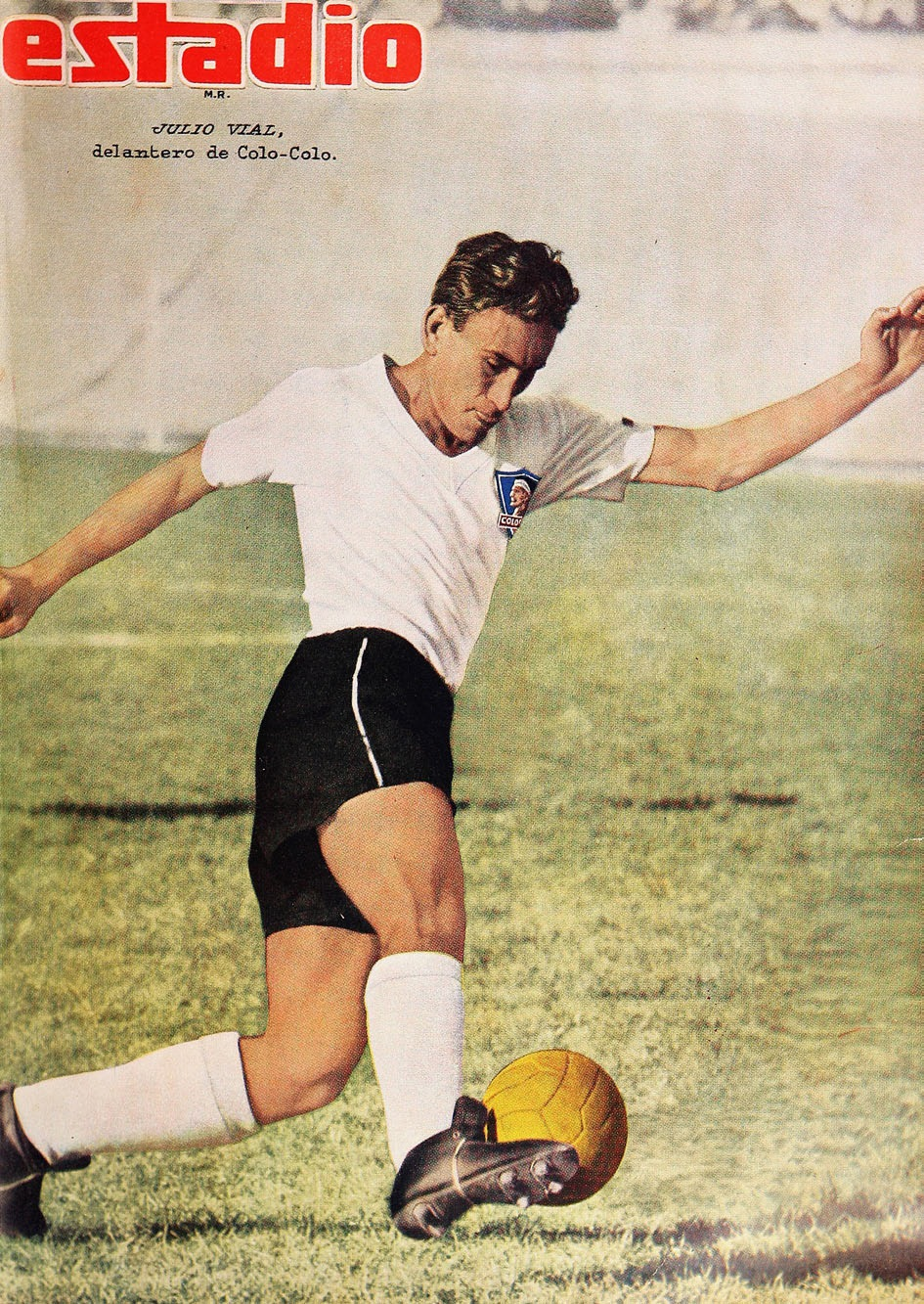
- in Estadio, 1953

Personal information
- Date of birth: 11 July 1933
- Date of death: 10 March 2016 (aged 82)
- Position: Defender

International career
| Years | Team | Apps | (Gls) |
- Chile

Julio Vial (1 July 1933 – 10 March 2016) was a Chilean footballer. He competed in the men's tournament at the 1952 Summer Olympics.
