= Alberto Fontanesi =

Italian footballer (1929-2016)

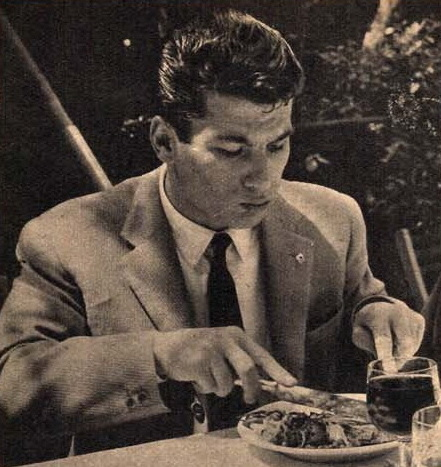
- Fontanesi in 1951

Personal information
- Full name: Alberto Fontanesi
- Date of birth: 10 March 1929
- Place of birth: Castel d'Ario, Italy
- Date of death: 1 April 2016 (aged 87)
- Place of death: Tresigallo, Italy
- Position: Forward

Senior career*
Years	Team	Apps	(Gls)
1949–1950	Bondenese	?	(?)
1950–1953	SPAL	105	(31)
1953–1955	Lazio	44	(10)
1955–1960	Udinese	158	(26)
1960–1962	Verona	31	(1)
1962–1963	Sambenedettese	6	(0)

International career
1952	Italy	3	(1)
- * Club domestic league appearances and goals

Alberto Fontanesi (Italian pronunciation: [alˈbɛrto fontaˈneːzi; -eːsi]; 10 March 1929 – 1 April 2016) was an Italian footballer who played as a forward. He competed in the men's tournament at the 1952 Summer Olympics.
