= Ercüment Güder =

Turkish footballer (born 1923)

Personal information
- Date of birth: 1923
- Position: Defender

Senior career*
Years	Team	Apps	(Gls)
- Ankaragücü

International career
- Turkey
- * Club domestic league appearances and goals

Ercüment Güder (born 1923) was a Turkish footballer. He competed in the men's tournament at the 1952 Summer Olympics.
