= Irenio Jara =

Chilean footballer (1929–1999)

Personal information
- Full name: Irenio Jara Costanzo
- Date of birth: 13 December 1929
- Date of death: 24 December 1999 (aged 70)
- Position: Forward

International career
Years	Team	Apps	(Gls)
- Chile

Irenio Jara (13 December 1929 – 24 December 1999) was a Chilean footballer. He competed in the men's tournament at the 1952 Summer Olympics.
