= Aleksandr Petrov (footballer, born 1925) =

Soviet footballer

Personal information
- Full name: Aleksandr Trofimovich Petrov
- Date of birth: September 27, 1925
- Place of birth: Leningrad, USSR
- Date of death: 1972
- Place of death: Moscow, USSR
- Position: Midfielder

Youth career
- Bolshevik Plant Leningrad

Senior career*
Years	Team	Apps	(Gls)
1946	Lokomotiv Omsk		
1947	Krylia Sovetov Omsk		
1948	Baranov Plant Omsk		
1950–1952	CDSA Moscow	48	(3)
1953	FC Dynamo Moscow (reserves)		
1954–1957	CDSA Moscow	70	(3)

International career
1952	USSR	3	(1)
- * Club domestic league appearances and goals

Aleksandr Trofimovich Petrov (Russian: Александр Трофимович Петров) (September 27, 1925 – 1972) was a Soviet football player.

== Honours ==
- Soviet Top League winner: 1950, 1951.
- Soviet Cup winner: 1951, 1955.

== International career ==
Petrov made his debut for USSR on July 15, 1952, in a 1952 Olympics game against Bulgaria. He scored a tying goal in the 5:5 tie with Yugoslavia at those Olympics in the 89th minute of the game.
