= Wolf Karni =

Finnish football referee (1911–1996)

- Full name: Wolf Waldemar Karni
- Born: 4 February 1911; Vyborg, Grand Duchy of Finland, Russian Empire
- Died: 31 January 1996 (aged 84); Helsinki, Finland

International
Years	League	Role
1949–1955	FIFA	Referee

Wolf Waldemar Karni (4 February 1911 – 31 January 1996) was a Finnish football referee.

Karni was born as Ze'ev Wulf Koseloff and changed his name in 1935. He used to play football and handball in the Jewish clubs Kadur Vyborg and Makkabi Helsinki.

Wolf Karni was an international football referee from 1949 to 1955. He officiated four matches at the 1952 Summer Olympics in Helsinki, including the semi-final match between Yugoslavia and Germany.

== International matches ==
Date	City	Teams	Result
11 September 1949	Oslo	Norway – Denmark	0–2
10 June 1951	Solna	Sweden – Turkey	3–1
15 July 1952	Tampere	Denmark – Greece	2–1
24 July 1952	Kotka	Hungary – Turkey	7–1
25 July 1952	Helsinki	Denmark – Yugoslavia	3–5
29 July 1952	Helsinki	Yugoslavia – Germany	1–3
15 November 1952	Hull	England – Netherlands	2–2
12 June 1955	Oslo	Norway – Romania	0–1

== See also ==
- List of Jews in sports (non-players)
