= Gösta Lindh =

Swedish footballer (1924–1984)

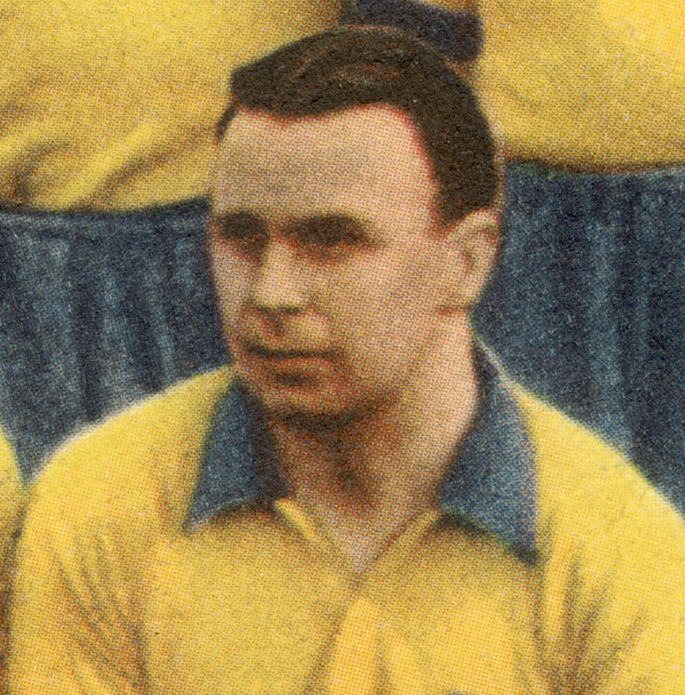

Personal information
- Born: 8 February 1924 Örebro, Sweden
- Died: 4 January 1984 (aged 59) Örebro, Sweden

Sport
- Sport: Football
- Club: Örebro SK
Medal record
Representing Sweden
Olympic Games
Bronze medal – third place	1952 Helsinki	Team competition

Gösta Lindh (8 February 1924 – 4 January 1984) was a Swedish association football player who won a bronze medal at the 1952 Summer Olympics. Between 1950 and 1954 he played 31 international matches and scored two goals.
