= Jean-Pierre Hoscheid =

Luxembourgish footballer and manager

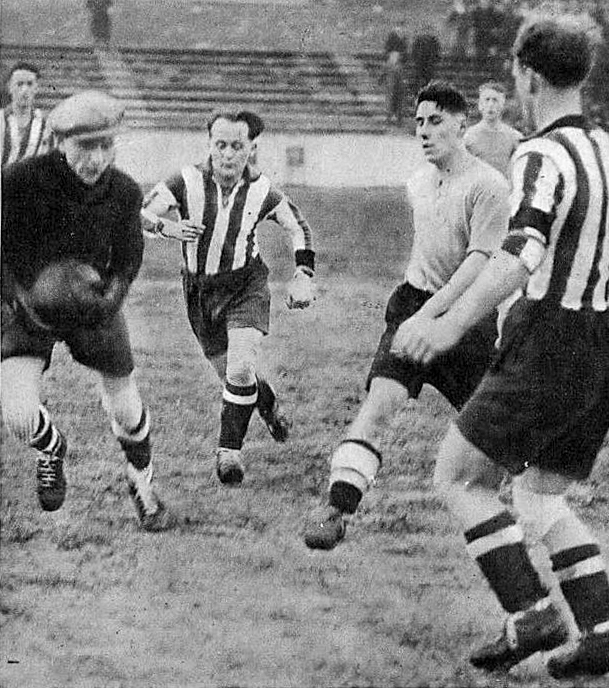
- Jeunesse Esch - Racing Club de Paris, 16. Februar 1935

Personal information
- Date of birth: 22 June 1912
- Place of birth: Bissen, Luxembourg
- Date of death: 15 July 1988 (aged 76)
- Place of death: Esch-sur-Alzette, Luxembourg
- Position: Goalkeeper

International career
Years	Team	Apps	(Gls)
- Luxembourg

Managerial career
- 1948–1949: Luxembourg

Jean-Pierre Hoscheid (22 June 1912 – 15 July 1988) was a Luxembourgish footballer. He competed in the men's tournament at the 1936 Summer Olympics. With Jules Müller and Albert Reuter he co-managed the Luxembourg national football team from 1948 until 1949. They managed Luxembourg in the football tournament of the 1948 Summer Olympic Games where Luxembourg were eliminated in the first round 6–1 by Yugoslavia.
