= Aredio Gimona =

Italian footballer and coach (1924-1994)

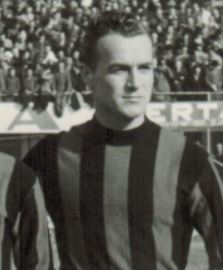

Personal information
- Date of birth: 1 February 1924
- Place of birth: Izola, Kingdom of Italy
- Date of death: 11 February 1994 (aged 70)
- Place of death: Livorno, Italy
- Height: 1.70 m (5 ft 7 in)
- Position: Midfielder

Senior career*
Years	Team	Apps	(Gls)
1940–1943	Pro Gorizia		
1943–1944	Ampelea Isola d'Istria	14	(8)
1945–1947	Milan	59	(21)
1947–1949	Livorno	71	(6)
1949–1953	Palermo	124	(9)
1953–1955	Juventus	48	(1)
1955–1956	Pro Patria	23	(0)
1956–1958	Livorno	43	(0)
1958–1959	Empoli	15	(0)

International career
1951–1952	Italy	3	(3)

Managerial career
- 1962–1963: Pistoiese
- 1963–1964: Arezzo
- ?: Livorno
- 1969–1970: Genoa
- * Club domestic league appearances and goals

Aredio Gimona (Italian pronunciation: [aˈrɛːdjo dʒiˈmoːna]; 1 February 1924 – 11 February 1994) was an Italian professional football player and coach who played as a midfielder. He represented Italy at the 1952 Summer Olympics.
