= Marcel Welter =

Luxembourgish footballer

Personal information
- Date of birth: 7 January 1924
- Place of birth: Pétange, Luxembourg
- Date of death: 25 July 2009 (aged 85)
- Position: Forward

International career
Years	Team	Apps	(Gls)
1950–1952	Luxembourg	4	(0)

Marcel Welter (7 January 1924 – 25 July 2009) was a Luxembourgish footballer. He played in four matches for the Luxembourg national football team from 1950 to 1952. He was also part of Luxembourg's squad for the football tournament at the 1948 Summer Olympics, but he did not play in any matches.
