= Jules Müller =

Luxembourgish association football manager (1908–1984)

Personal information
- Full name: Jules Müller
- Date of birth: 20 March 1908
- Place of birth: Niederkorn, Luxembourg
- Date of death: 13 December 1984 (aged 76)
- Place of death: Luxembourg City, Luxembourg

Managerial career
- Years: Team
- 1948–1949: Luxembourg

Jules Müller (20 March 1908 – 13 December 1984) was a Luxembourgish football manager. With Jean-Pierre Hoscheid and Albert Reuter he co-managed the Luxembourg national football team from 1948 until 1949. They managed Luxembourg in the football tournament of the 1948 Summer Olympic Games where Luxembourg were eliminated in the first round 6–1 by Yugoslavia. Müller died in Luxembourg City on 13 December 1984, at the age of 76.
