= Albert Reuter =

Luxembourgish footballer and manager

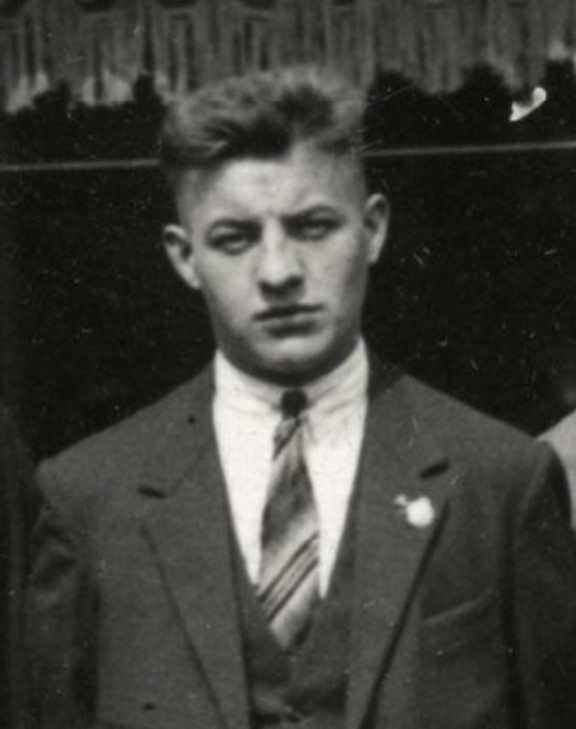
- Albert Reuter in 1928

Personal information
- Date of birth: 11 September 1907
- Place of birth: Luxembourg, Luxembourg
- Date of death: 2 March 2003 (aged 95)
- Place of death: Luxembourg, Luxembourg

International career
| Years | Team | Apps | (Gls) |
- Luxembourg

Albert Reuter (11 September 1907 – 2 March 2003) was a Luxembourgish footballer. He competed in the men's tournament at the 1928 Summer Olympics. With Jean-Pierre Hoscheid and Jules Müller he co-managed the Luxembourg national football team from 1948 until 1949. They managed Luxembourg in the football tournament of the 1948 Summer Olympic Games where Luxembourg were eliminated in the first round 6–1 by Yugoslavia.
