= Sylve Bengtsson =

Swedish footballer (1930–2005)

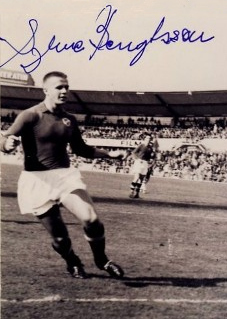
- Sylve Bengtsson in May 1959

Personal information
- Full name: Sylve Bengtsson
- Date of birth: 2 July 1930
- Place of birth: Halmstad, Sweden
- Date of death: 30 April 2005 (aged 74)
- Place of death: Halmstad, Sweden
- Position: Forward

Youth career
- Halmstads BK

Senior career*
Years	Team	Apps	(Gls)
1947–1948	Halmstads BK		
1949–1952	Hälsingborgs IF		
1953–1960	Halmstads BK		
1961–1963	Gnosjö IF		
1964–1965	Hälsingborgs IF		
1967	Halmstads BK		

International career
1950–1958	Sweden	28	(7)

Managerial career
- 1967: Halmstads BK
- 1968: Laholms FK
- 1971: Halmstads BK
Medal record
Representing Sweden
Olympic Games
Bronze medal – third place	1952 Helsinki	Team competition
- * Club domestic league appearances and goals

Sylve Boris Bengtsson (2 July 1930 – 30 April 2005) was a Swedish association football forward.

== Career ==
Bengtsson started his career in Halmstads BK at the age of 17 in 1947 against Djurgårdens IF, a 0–5 defeat. In 1948 as Halmstads BK was relegated from Allsvenskan Sylve left for Hälsingborgs IF (now Helsingborgs IF); during his time in Hälsingborg he made his first national team appearance for Sweden. He was part of the Sweden national team that defeated West Germany to win a bronze medal in the 1952 Summer Olympics in Helsinki.

After the Summer Olympics he returned to Halmstads BK and helped the club back up in Allsvenskan, in season 1954–55 he won the Stora Silvret with the club and in the following season he became the top goalscorer with 22 goals. Halmstads BK was relegated yet again in 1959 and in 1961 Sylve left for Gnosjö IF where he played for three seasons before returning to Allsvenskan and Hälsingborgs IF to play between 1964 and 1965.

In 1967, he returned to Halmstads BK as a playing coach and in 1968 he became manager for Laholms FK, shortly south of Halmstad, he then returned to Halmstads BK as teamleader; he made a short time as manager yet again for the club during the summer of 1971 and led the club back to Allsvenskan.

Aside from playing football he also worked as a baker and confectioner.

== Achievements ==
=== Club ===
Halmstads BK

- Allsvenskan: runners-up 1954–55

=== International ===
Sweden

- Summer Olympics third place: 1952

=== Individual ===
- Allsvenskan top goalscorer: 1955–1956
