= Léon Mart =

Luxembourgish footballer (1914–1984)

Personal information
- Date of birth: 18 September 1914
- Date of death: 14 July 1984 (aged 69)
- Position: Forward

Senior career*
Years	Team	Apps	(Gls)
1932–1946	Fola Esch		

International career
1933–1946	Luxembourg	24	(16)
- * Club domestic league appearances and goals

Léon Mart (18 September 1914 – 14 July 1984) was a Luxembourgish footballer who played as a forward.

== Career ==
Mart played his entire career in Luxembourg, for Fola Esch. He played as centre forward for the Luxembourg national team, and scored a national record 16 goals in 24 international appearances (including non-official games) between 1933 and 1946. He played in one FIFA World Cup qualification match and in one Olympic Games match.
