= Johann Zeitler =

German footballer (1927–2018)

Hans Zeitler
Personal information
- Full name: Johann Zeitler
- Date of birth: 30 April 1927
- Place of birth: Bindlach, Germany
- Date of death: 1 March 2018 (aged 90)
- Place of death: Bindlach, Germany
- Position: Forward

Senior career*
Years	Team	Apps	(Gls)
1949–1958	VfB Bayreuth		
1958–1961	SpVgg Bayreuth		

International career
1952	West Germany	1	(1)
- * Club domestic league appearances and goals

Johann Zeitler (30 April 1927 – 1 March 2018) was a German footballer who competed in the 1952 Summer Olympics and in the 1956 Summer Olympics.
