= Nicolas Kettel =

Luxembourgish footballer

Nicolas Kettel (17 December 1925 — 7 April 1960) was a Luxembourgish footballer who played as a forward. Born in Dudelange, he played from 1945 to 1960, mostly for his hometown club Stade Dudelange, with a spell at Switzerland's Young Boys in between (1948–1953).

He played 56 matches for the Luxembourg national team (five as captain) and scored 13 goals. Five of his games were FIFA World Cup qualifiers, in which he did not score (1950, 1958).

His debut came on 23 February 1946 in a 7–0 friendly loss to Belgium in Charleroi, and he scored his first goal against the same opposition in a 2–1 loss on 30 October the same year.

Kettel was named in Luxembourg's squad for the 1948 Olympic tournament in Great Britain. In the preliminary round, he scored in a 6–0 win over Afghanistan at the Goldstone Ground in Brighton, ahead of a 6–1 loss to Yugoslavia in the first round at Craven Cottage.

He died in a car accident aged 34, while still an active player.
