= Karl Klug (footballer) =

German footballer

Personal information
- Date of birth: 8 April 1925
- Date of death: 11 January 1971 (aged 45)

Karl Klug (8 April 1925 – 11 January 1971) was a German footballer who competed in the 1952 Summer Olympics.
