= Gösta Löfgren =

Swedish footballer

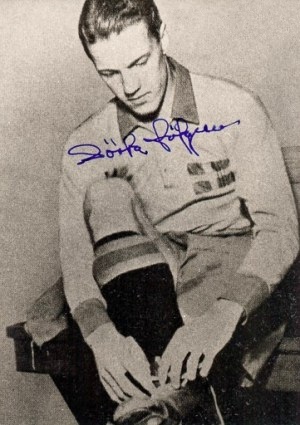
- Löfgren c.1952

Personal information
- Full name: Karl Gösta Herbert Löfgren
- Date of birth: 29 August 1923
- Place of birth: Motala, Sweden
- Date of death: 5 September 2006 (aged 83)
- Place of death: Motala, Sweden
- Position: Forward

Senior career*
Years	Team	Apps	(Gls)
–	Motala AIF	25	(9)
–	IFK Norrköping	42	(18)
Total		67	(27)

International career
1951–1961	Sweden	40	(12)

Managerial career
- 1971–1972: IFK Norrköping
Medal record
Representing Sweden
Olympic Games
Bronze medal – third place	1952 Helsinki
FIFA World Cup
Runner-up	1958 Sweden
- * Club domestic league appearances and goals

Karl Gösta Herbert "Lövet" Löfgren (29 August 1923 – 5 September 2006) was a Swedish association football player who won a bronze medal at the 1952 Summer Olympics and a silver medal at the 1958 FIFA World Cup. Between 1951 and 1961, he played 40 international matches and scored 12 goals.

Gösta played for Motala AIF and took the team to Allsvenskan in 1957. In 1960, he began playing for IFK Norrköping and won the Swedish National Championship. He later coached IFK Norrköping.
