= Jansen (footballer) =

Brazilian footballer (1927–2010)

Personal information
- Full name: Jansen José Moreira
- Date of birth: 10 July 1927
- Place of birth: Rio de Janeiro, Brazil
- Date of death: 9 July 2010 (aged 82)
- Place of death: Porciúncula, Brazil
- Position: Forward

Youth career
- 1943–1949: Vasco da Gama

Senior career*
Years	Team	Apps	(Gls)
1950–1952	Vasco da Gama	58	(18)
1953–1954	Ponte Preta		
1955–1956	Corinthians	47	(11)

International career
1952	Brazil Olympic	3	(1)
- * Club domestic league appearances and goals

Jansen José Moreira (10 July 1927 – 9 July 2010) was a Brazilian footballer who played as a forward. He competed in the 1952 Summer Olympics.

== Honours ==
Vasco da Gama

- Campeonato Carioca: 1950, 1952
