= Camille Libar =

Luxembourgish footballer (1917–1991)

Personal information
- Date of birth: 27 December 1917
- Place of birth: Dudelange, Luxembourg
- Date of death: 9 October 1991 (aged 73)
- Place of death: Luxembourg
- Position: Striker

Senior career*
Years	Team	Apps	(Gls)
1937–1940	Stade Dudelange		
1944–1947	Stade Dudelange		
1947–1948	Strasbourg	6	(1)
1948–1950	Bordeaux	60	(55)
1950–1951	Metz	23	(17)
1951–1952	Toulouse FC	29	(9)
Total		128	(72)

International career
1938–1947	Luxembourg	24	(14)

Managerial career
- 1953–1957: Le Mans
- 1957–1960: Bordeaux
- * Club domestic league appearances and goals

Camille Libar (27 December 1917 – 9 October 1991) was a football player and manager from Luxembourg.

== Club career ==
Libar played for Stade Dudelange, Strasbourg, Bordeaux, Metz and Toulouse FC. In the 1948–49 season, he was Ligue 2 top goalscorer with Bordeaux.

== International career ==
He scored 14 goals for Luxembourg from 1938 to 1947. He played in 2 FIFA World Cup qualification matches.

== Manager career ==
He then managed Le Mans and Girondins de Bordeaux.
