= Gusty Kemp =

Luxembourgish footballer (1917–1948)

Personal information
- Full name: Gustave Kemp
- Date of birth: 24 February 1917
- Place of birth: Differdange, Luxembourg
- Date of death: 13 April 1948 (aged 31)
- Place of death: Hayange, France
- Height: 1.73 m (5 ft 8 in)
- Position: Forward

Senior career*
Years	Team	Apps	(Gls)
1935–1945	AS Differdange		
1945–1948	Metz	84	(55)
Total		84	(55)

International career
1936–1945	Luxembourg	20	(15)
1936	Luxembourg Olympic	1	(0)
- * Club domestic league appearances and goals

Gustave "Gusty" Kemp (24 February 1917 – 13 April 1948) was a Luxembourger footballer who played as a midfielder for the Luxembourg national team. He also represented his nation at the 1936 Summer Olympics in Berlin.

== Career statistics ==
=== Club ===
Appearances and goals by club, season and competition
Club	Season	League			Cup		Continental		Other		Total	
Club	Season	Division	Apps	Goals	Apps	Goals	Apps	Goals	Apps	Goals	Apps	Goals
Metz	1945–46	Division Nationale	19	11	0	0	–		0	0	19	11
Metz	1946–47	Division Nationale	38	32	0	0	–		0	0	38	32
Metz	1947–48	Division Nationale	27	12	0	0	–		0	0	27	12
Career total			84	55	0	0	0	0	0	0	84	55

=== International ===
Appearances and goals by national team and year
National team	Year	Apps	Goals
Luxembourg	1936	3	3
Luxembourg	1937	4	3
Luxembourg	1938	5	1
Luxembourg	1939	3	2
Luxembourg	1940	3	4
Luxembourg	1941	0	0
Luxembourg	1942	0	0
Luxembourg	1943	0	0
Luxembourg	1944	0	0
Luxembourg	1945	2	2
Total		20	15

Scores and results list Luxembourg's goal tally first, score column indicates score after each Kemp goal.

List of international goals scored by Gusty Kemp
No.	Date	Venue	Opponent	Score	Result	Competition
1	27 September 1936	Grotenburg-Stadion, Krefeld, Germany	Germany	1–1	2–7	Friendly
2	27 September 1936	Grotenburg-Stadion, Krefeld, Germany	Germany	2–2	2–7	Friendly
3	8 November 1936	Stade Municipal, Lëtzebuerg, Luxembourg	Switzerland	1–0	3–1	Friendly
4	21 March 1937	Stade Municipal, Lëtzebuerg, Luxembourg	Germany	2–3	2–3	Friendly
5	11 April 1937	Stade de la Frontière, Esch-sur-Alzette, Luxembourg	Belgium	1–4	1–5	Friendly
6	25 April 1937	Stade Municipal, Lëtzebuerg, Luxembourg	Italy	1–0	3–2	Friendly
7	13 March 1938	Stade Municipal, Lëtzebuerg, Luxembourg	Belgium	2–1	2–3	1938 FIFA World Cup qualification
8	21 January 1939	Stade de Paris, Saint-Ouen, Seine-Saint-Denis, Paris, France	France	2–3	2–4	Friendly
9	29 January 1939	Stade Municipal, Dudelange, Luxembourg	Belgium	4–2	5–3	Friendly
10	10 March 1940	Stade Municipal, Lëtzebuerg, Luxembourg	Belgium	1–0	3–4	Friendly
11	10 March 1940	Stade Municipal, Lëtzebuerg, Luxembourg	Belgium	2–1	3–4	Friendly
12	31 March 1940	De Kuip, Rotterdam, Netherlands	Netherlands	1–1	5–4	Friendly
13	31 March 1940	De Kuip, Rotterdam, Netherlands	Netherlands	3–2	5–4	Friendly
14	13 May 1945	Stade Municipal, Lëtzebuerg, Luxembourg	Belgium	4–0	4–1	Friendly
15	27 May 1945	Stade Municipal, Lëtzebuerg, Luxembourg	France	1–0	2–3	Friendly
