= Léon Letsch =

Luxembourgish footballer

Personal information
- Full name: Léon Letsch
- Date of birth: 23 May 1927 (age 99)
- Place of birth: Mamer, Luxembourg
- Position: Striker

Senior career*
Years	Team	Apps	(Gls)
1945–1950	Spora Luxembourg		
1950–1953	CO Roubaix-Tourcoing		
1953–1961	Spora Luxembourg		

International career
1947–1961	Luxembourg	53	(10)
- * Club domestic league appearances and goals

Léon Letsch (born 23 May 1927) is a Luxembourgish former footballer who played as a striker. He was a member of the Luxembourg national football team from 1947 to 1961. He also played for Luxembourg at the 1952 Summer Olympics.
