= Arto Tolsa Areena =

Football stadium in Kotka, Finland

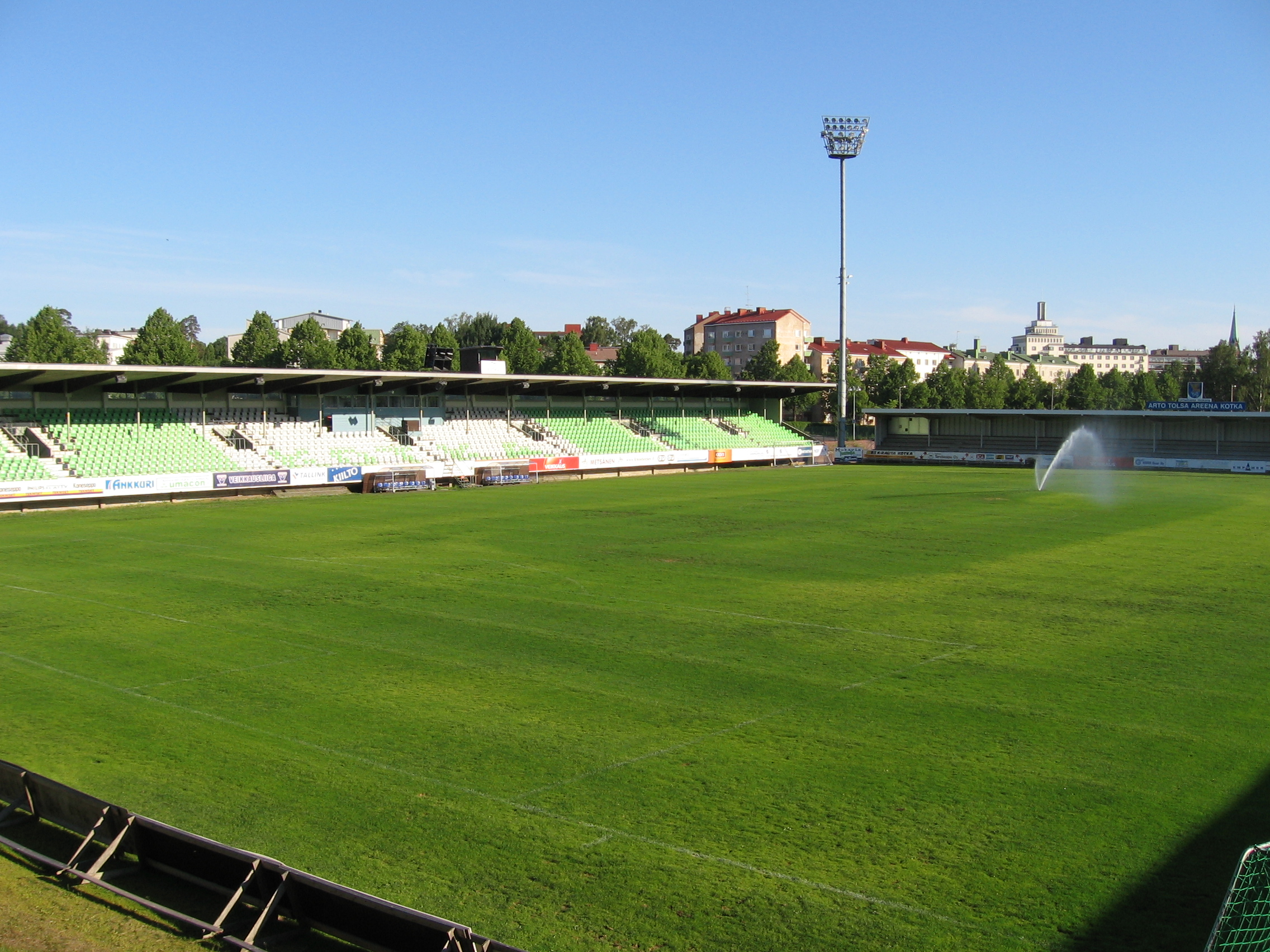
- Interactive map of Arto Tolsa Areena
- Full name: Arto Tolsa Areena
- Former names: Kotkan urheilukeskus
- Location: Kotka, Finland
- Coordinates: 60°27′27″N 26°56′23″E
- Owner: City of Kotka
- Operator: City of Kotka
- Capacity: 4,780 (allseater)
- Surface: Artificial grass
- Field size: 105 x 65 m

Construction
- Opened: 1952
- Renovated: 2006

Tenant
- KTP

Arto Tolsa Areena is a football stadium in Kotka, Finland. It is the home stadium of Kotkan Työväen Palloilijat (KTP). The stadium holds 4,780 and was inaugurated in 1952 for the Helsinki Olympics. The stadium's record attendance was made during the Olympic Games in the football match between the Soviet Union and Bulgaria, the score having been 2–1 a.e.t. Depending on the source, the record is 10,000, or 10,637 or 10,950.

Arto Tolsa Areena used to be known as "Urheilukeskus" ("Sports Center" in Finnish). It got its current name after it was renovated around the turn of millennium. The current name comes from Arto Tolsa, who was a legendary Finnish player of Kotkan Työväen Palloilijat, the predecessor of KTP.

The covered main stand holds 2,500 spectators. The size of the pitch is 105 by 65 metres. The power of the lighting system is 1200 lux.

At the beginning of the 2015 season, the pitch was converted to an artificial playing surface. In May 2024, a new stand was completed.
