= Luxembourg national football team =

Men's national association football team

Luxembourg
- Nickname(s): D'Rout Léiwen; Les Lions Rouges; Die Roten Löwen (The Red Lions)
- Association: Fédération Luxembourgeoise de Football (FLF)
- Confederation: UEFA (Europe)
- Head coach: Jeff Strasser
- Captain: Laurent Jans
- Most caps: Laurent Jans (128)
- Top scorer: Gerson Rodrigues (23)
- Home stadium: Stade de Luxembourg
- FIFA code: LUX
First colours	Second colours

FIFA ranking
- Current: 103 ▼2 (18 November 2026)
- Highest: 82 (September 2018)
- Lowest: 195 (August 2006)

First international
- Luxembourg 1–4 France (Luxembourg, Luxembourg; 29 October 1911)

Biggest win
- Luxembourg 6–0 Afghanistan (Brighton, England; 26 July 1948)

Biggest defeat
- Germany 9–0 Luxembourg (Berlin, Germany; 4 August 1936); Luxembourg 0–9 England (Luxembourg, Luxembourg; 19 October 1960); England 9–0 Luxembourg (London, England; 15 December 1982); Portugal 9–0 Luxembourg (Almancil, Portugal; 11 September 2023)

The Luxembourg national football team (nicknamed the Red Lions; Luxembourgish: Lëtzebuergesch Foussballnationalekipp, French: Équipe du Luxembourg de football, German: Luxemburgische Fußballnationalmannschaft) is the national football team of Luxembourg, and is controlled by the Luxembourg Football Federation. The team plays most of its home matches at the Stade de Luxembourg in Luxembourg City.

Luxembourg has participated in every FIFA World Cup qualifiers since those for the 1934 World Cup, and in UEFA European Championship qualifiers since those for Euro 1964. As of 2026, they have never qualified for any of these major tournaments. Luxembourg is the nation with the most qualifying campaigns in both of these competitions without ever making it to the finals. However, they did compete in six Olympic football events between 1920 and 1952.

== History ==
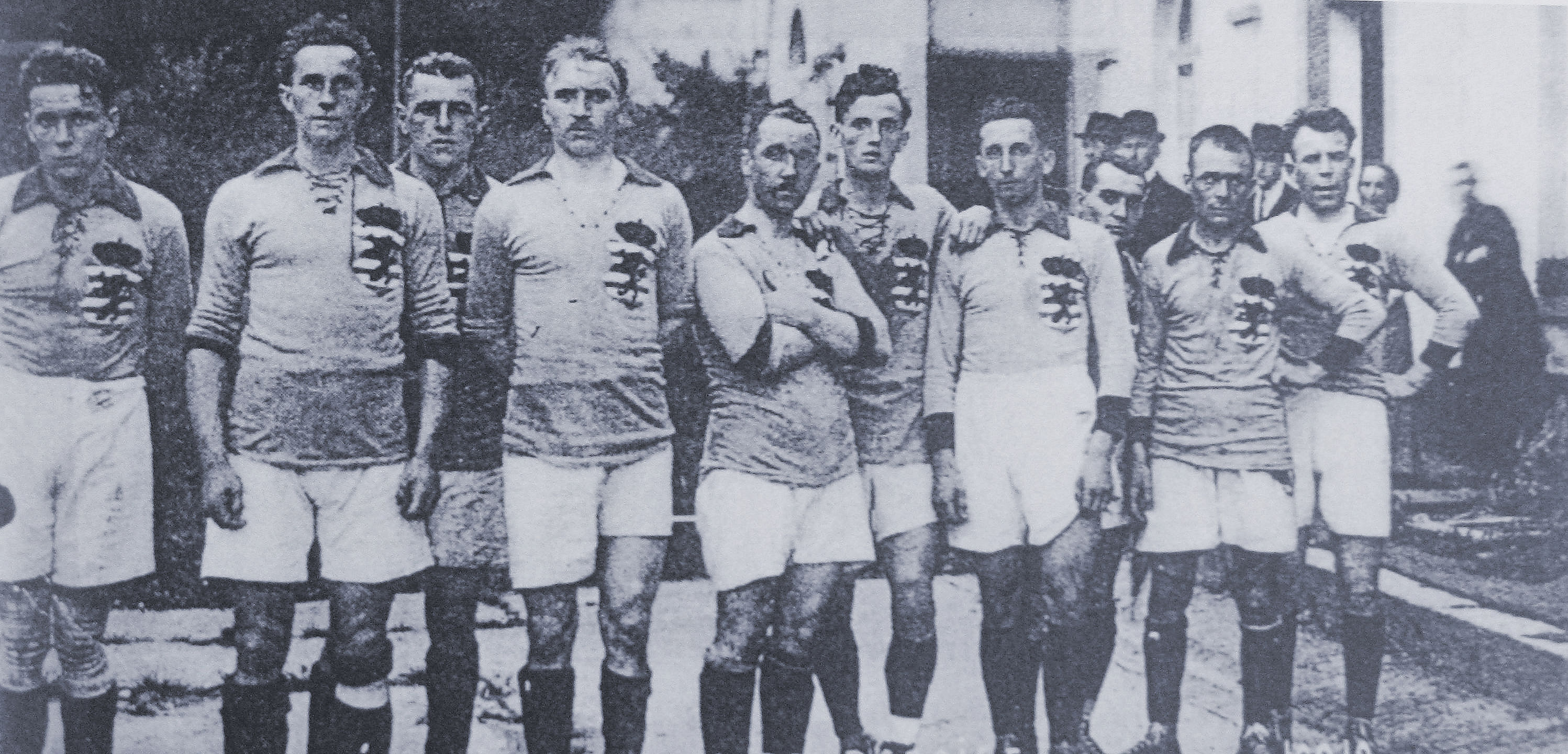
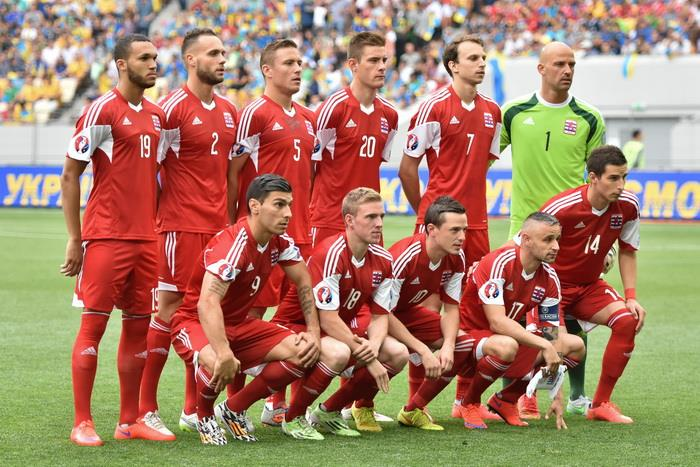
The Luxembourg national football team in 1920 (above), and in 2015

Luxembourg played their first ever international match on 29 October 1911, in a friendly match against France; it resulted in a 1–4 defeat. Their first victory came on 8 February 1914, also in a match against France, which they won 5–4.

The national side of Luxembourg competed in six Olympic football events between 1920 and 1952, and survived the preliminary round twice (in 1948 and 1952). In between, Luxembourg participated in qualifiers for the FIFA World Cup, but has never qualified.

Starting in 1921, the Luxembourg national A-selection would play 239 unofficial international matches until 1981, mostly against other countries' B-teams like those of Belgium, France, Switzerland and West Germany, as well as a team representing South-Netherlands.

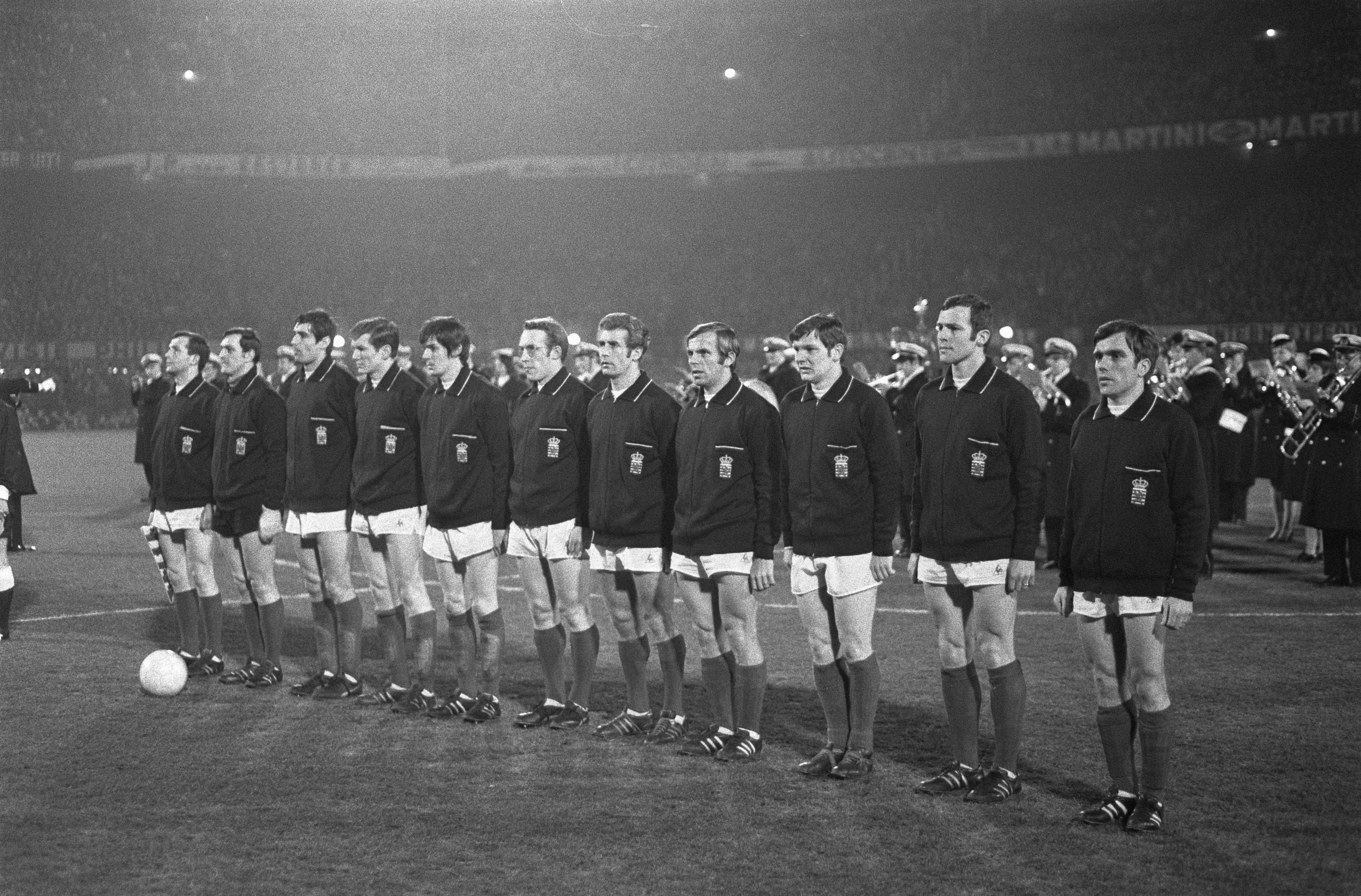
The Luxembourg team in 1969, before a World Cup qualifier

After their last Olympic tournament in 1952, the national team also started playing in qualifying groups for UEFA European Championships, but could not reach the major European tournament end stages. The only time that the team was close to qualifying for a European or World Championship was for the Euro 1964. In the first qualification round, they defeated the Netherlands with a score of 3–2 on aggregate after two matches. A Dutch newspaper called the shock after the second match "David Luxembourg beat Goliath Netherlands 2–1". In the round of eight, Luxembourg and Denmark fought for a spot in the final tournament. The winner was decided after three matches; Denmark was the winner with a total aggregate score of 6–5.

When the national team does win a competitive match, they are often celebrated by national media and fans, as was the case after a 2–1 win against Switzerland in 2008.

On 3 September 2017, Luxembourg faced France in a goalless draw at Stadium Municipal in Toulouse, France. It was the first time France had failed to win against Luxembourg since 1914, when Luxembourg won, 5–4. On 10 November 2017, Luxembourg defeated Hungary 2–1 in a friendly victory.

On 28 March 2021, Luxembourg beat the Republic of Ireland in a 2022 FIFA World Cup qualification match with a goal from Gerson Rodrigues in the 85th minute. In 2023, Luxembourg achieved some of their best results in European Championship qualifying, finishing third in their group (of six teams) and qualifying for a play-off for a finals berth, but they lost 2–0 against Georgia. Rodrigues also became the top goalscorer in the history of the national team, surpassing the 16-goal tally by Léon Mart, by scoring five goals during the qualifying process, a record for a Luxembourgish footballer.

On 22 March 2025, Luxembourg showed improvement with a convincing victory against Sweden in a friendly match.

== Kit ==
Kit provider	Period
(Germany) Adidas	1976–2005
(Italy) Erreà	2005–2007
(Germany) Jako	2008–2013
(Germany) Adidas	2014–2018
(Italy) Macron	2018–2022
(Italy) Erreà	2022–2026
(Germany) Jako	2026–present

== Home stadium ==
Stade de Luxembourg

As of 1 September 2021, the Luxembourg national team adopted Luxembourg City's Stade de Luxembourg, the country's national stadium, as its home venue. Formerly, the team played at the Stade Josy Barthel, where, at counting in August 2015, it had played 235 games, including unofficial matches.

=== Supporters ===
The M-Block Fanatics is a non-profit football supporters' association for the Luxembourg national football team. M-Block Fanatics was founded in 1995 and derives its name from the fact that originally they used to occupy the M-Block of the former National Stadium.

== Results and fixtures ==
The following is a list of match results in the last 12 months, as well as any future matches that have been scheduled.

Win Draw Loss Fixture

=== 2026 ===
26 March 2026 2024-25 Nations League Playoff C/D	Malta	0–2	Luxembourg	Ta' Qali, Malta
18:00 UTC+1		Report	V. Thill 47'; Olesen 90+3'	Stadium: National Stadium; Attendance: 9,467; Referee: Irfan Peljto (Bosnia and Herzegovina)

31 March 2026 2024-25 Nations League Playoff C/D	Luxembourg	3–0 (5–0 agg.)	Malta	Luxembourg City, Luxembourg
18:00 UTC+1	V. Thill 20'; Sinani 50'; Moreira 70'	Report		Stadium: Stade de Luxembourg; Attendance: 9,113; Referee: Daniel Siebert (Germany)

3 June 2026 Friendly	Luxembourg	0–1	Italy	Luxembourg City, Luxembourg
20:45 UTC+2		Report	Esposito 49'	Stadium: Stade de Luxembourg; Attendance: 9,214; Referee: Joey Kooij (Netherlands)

6 June 2026 Friendly	Albania	0–1	Luxembourg	Tirana, Albania
20:00 UTC+2		Report	Sinani 8'	Stadium: Arena Kombëtare; Attendance: 5,142; Referee: Genc Nuza (Kosovo)

26 September 2026 2026–27 Nations League	Bulgaria	1–2	Luxembourg	Plovdiv, Bulgaria
19:00 UTC+3	Chandarov 18'	Report	Barreiro 37'; V. Thill 65'	Stadium: Hristo Botev Stadium; Attendance: 4,300; Referee: Sander van der Eijk (Netherlands)

29 September 2026 2026–27 Nations League	Luxembourg	0–3	Iceland	Luxembourg City, Luxembourg
20:45 UTC+2		Report	Guðjohnsen 13'; Óskarsson 39'; Pálsson 73'	Stadium: Stade de Luxembourg; Attendance: 8,879; Referee: Enea Jorgji (Albania)

3 October 2026 2026–27 Nations League	Estonia	1–0	Luxembourg	Tallinn, Estonia
19:00 UTC+3	Peetson 5'	Report		Stadium: Lilleküla Stadium; Attendance: 7,211; Referee: Paweł Raczkowski (Poland)

6 October 2026 2026–27 Nations League	Luxembourg	0–2	Bulgaria	Luxembourg City, Luxembourg
20:45 UTC+2		Report	Balov 19'; Iliev 34'	Stadium: Stade de Luxembourg; Attendance: 8,027; Referee: Andris Treimanis (Latvia)

13 November 2026 2026–27 Nations League	Luxembourg	0–1	Estonia	Luxembourg City, Luxembourg
20:45 UTC+1		Report	Paskotši 42'	Stadium: Stade de Luxembourg; Attendance: 9,214; Referee: Ishmael Barbara (Malta)

16 November 2026 2026–27 Nations League	Iceland	3–0	Luxembourg	Reykjavík, Iceland
17:00 UTC+0	Willumsson 25'; Guðjohnsen 37' (pen.); Ellertsson 50'	Report		Stadium: Laugardalsvöllur; Attendance: 2,644; Referee: Marian Barbu (Romania)

== Staff ==
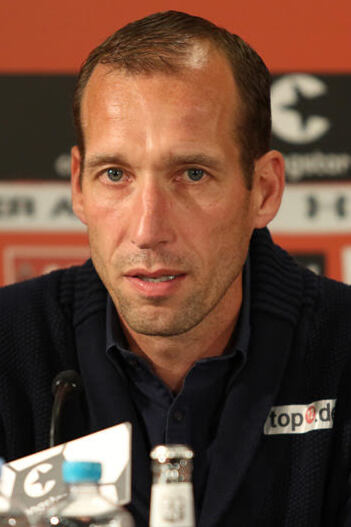
Jeff Strasser, the current head coach of Luxembourg national football team.

As of 2025, the staff of the Luxembourg national team includes the following members:

Position	Name
Technical director	(Luxembourg) Manuel Cardoni
Head coach	(Luxembourg) Jeff Strasser
Assistant coach	(Luxembourg) Mario Mutsch
Goalkeeping coach	(Luxembourg) Rui Forte
Fitness coach	(Luxembourg) Claude Origer
Doctors	(Luxembourg) Patrick Dang
Doctors	(Luxembourg) Lara Heinz
Physiotherapists	(Germany) Alexander Kähler
Physiotherapists	(Luxembourg) Erwan Deshoux
Physiotherapists	(Luxembourg) Gilles Hoffmann
Video analyst	(France) Clément Gonin
Equipment manager	(Luxembourg) Léon Huss
Equipment manager	(Luxembourg) Jos Koecher
Equipment manager	(Luxembourg) Romain Sailer

=== Coaching history ===
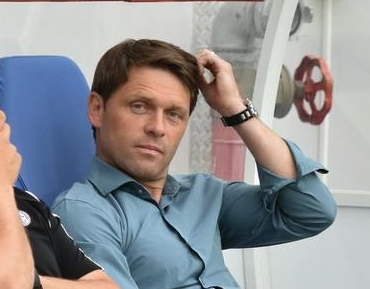
Luc Holtz, the Luxembourg manager from 2010 to 2025.

The following managers have been in charge of Luxembourg's national squad:

- (Luxembourg) Paul Feierstein (1933–1948)
- (Luxembourg) Jean-Pierre Hoscheid, Jules Müller, & Albert Reuter (1948–1949)
- (Austria) Adolf Patek (1949–1953)
- (Hungary) Béla Volentik (1953–1955)
- (Austria) Eduard Havlicek (1955)
- (Hungary) Nándor Lengyel (1955–1959)
- (France) Pierre Sinibaldi (1959–1960)
- (West Germany) Robert Heinz (1960–1969)
- (Austria) Ernst Melchior (1969–1972)
- (France) Gilbert Legrand (1972–1977)
- (Luxembourg) Arthur Schoos (1978)
- (Luxembourg) Louis Pilot (1978–1984)
- (Belgium) Jozef Vliers (1984)
- (Luxembourg) Josy Kirchens (1985)
- (Luxembourg) Paul Philipp (1985–2001)
- (Denmark) Allan Simonsen (2001–2004)
- (Luxembourg) Guy Hellers (2004–2010)
- (Luxembourg) Luc Holtz (2010–2025)
- (Luxembourg) Jeff Strasser (2025–)

== Players ==
=== Current squad ===
The following players were called up for the 2026–27 UEFA Nations League matches against Estonia on 13 November and Iceland on 16 November 2026.

Caps and goals as of 16 November 2026 after the match against Iceland.

No.	Pos.	Player	Date of birth (age)	Caps	Goals	Club
1	GK	Anthony Moris	29 April 1990 (age 36)	88	0	(Saudi Arabian Football Federation) Al-Khaleej
12	GK	Tiago Pereira Cardoso	7 April 2006 (age 20)	9	0	(Royal Belgian Football Association) RAAL La Louvière
23	GK	Lucas Fox	2 October 2000 (age 26)	0	0	(German Football Association) Bremer SV
	GK	Tim Kips	1 November 2000 (age 26)	0	0	(German Football Association) Phönix Lübeck
2	DF	Eldin Džogović	8 June 2003 (age 23)	15	0	(German Football Association) 1. FC Magdeburg
3	DF	Enes Mahmutović	22 May 1997 (age 29)	49	0	(Georgian Football Federation) Batumi
4	DF	Florian Bohnert	9 November 1997 (age 29)	69	1	(German Football Association) Hansa Rostock
5	DF	Vahid Selimović	3 April 1997 (age 29)	19	1	(Georgian Football Federation) Iberia 1999
13	DF	Dirk Carlson	1 April 1998 (age 28)	78	0	(Georgian Football Federation) Batumi
14	DF	Eric Veiga	18 February 1997 (age 29)	11	0	(Luxembourg Football Federation) Atert Bissen
18	DF	Laurent Jans (Captain)	5 August 1992 (age 34)	128	1	(Royal Belgian Football Association) Beveren
22	DF	Tim Hall	15 April 1997 (age 29)	5	0	(Luxembourg Football Federation) UNA Strassen
6	MF	Tomás Moreira	26 June 2005 (age 21)	22	1	(Turkish Football Federation) Bodrumspor
8	MF	Enzo Duarte	28 June 2009 (age 17)	10	0	(German Football Association) Borussia Dortmund II
13	MF	Farid Ikene	15 December 2000 (age 25)	0	0	(Luxembourg Football Federation) Racing Luxembourg
16	MF	Miguel Gonçalves	18 August 2004 (age 22)	4	0	(German Football Association) Fortuna Düsseldorf
19	MF	Mathias Olesen	21 March 2001 (age 25)	45	2	(Danish Football Association) Sønderjyske
21	MF	Sébastien Thill	29 December 1993 (age 32)	51	2	(Luxembourg Football Federation) Differdange 03
7	FW	Aiman Dardari	21 March 2005 (age 21)	19	1	(German Football Association) Rot-Weiss Essen
9	FW	Jayson Videira	17 February 2005 (age 21)	9	0	(German Football Association) Mainz 05 II
10	FW	Timothé Rupil	12 June 2003 (age 23)	17	0	(Swedish Football Association) Helsingborgs
11	FW	Vincent Thill	4 February 2000 (age 26)	67	6	(German Football Association) Waldhof Mannheim
15	FW	Omar Natami	15 December 1998 (age 27)	4	0	(Luxembourg Football Federation) UNA Strassen
17	FW	Hamza Kadamani	13 September 2009 (age 17)	8	0	(French Football Federation) Metz
20	FW	Patrick Macedo	30 September 1995 (age 31)	1	0	(Luxembourg Football Federation) Résidence Walferdange

=== Recent call-ups ===
The following players have been called up for the team within the last 12 months and are still available and eligible for selection.

Pos.	Player	Date of birth (age)	Caps	Goals	Club	Latest call-up
DF	Marvin Martins	17 February 1995 (age 31)	42	3	(Latvia) Liepāja	v. Bulgaria, 6 October 2026
DF	Sofiane Ikene	27 February 2005 (age 21)	2	0	(Germany) Rot-Weiß Erfurt	v. Bulgaria, 6 October 2026
DF	Seid Korać	20 October 2001 (age 25)	23	2	(Italy) Hellas Verona	v. Bulgaria, 26 September 2026^{INJ}
DF	Mica Pinto	4 June 1993 (age 33)	43	1	Unattached	v. Albania, 6 June 2026
DF	Helmer Tavares	27 April 2007 (age 19)	0	0	(Spain) RC Alcobendas	v. Albania, 6 June 2026
MF	Danel Sinani	5 April 1997 (age 29)	83	16	(Italy) Sampdoria	v. Bulgaria, 6 October 2026
MF	Leandro Barreiro	3 January 2000 (age 26)	75	3	(Portugal) Benfica	v. Bulgaria, 6 October 2026
MF	Olivier Thill	17 December 1996 (age 29)	48	3	(Luxembourg) Käerjéng 97	v. Bulgaria, 6 October 2026
MF	Christopher Martins	19 February 1997 (age 29)	83	1	(Russia) Spartak Moscow	v. Albania, 6 June 2026
MF	Diego Duarte	3 May 2006 (age 20)	1	0	(Belgium) Seraing	v. Italy, 3 June 2026^{U21}
FW	Arnold Qevani	27 September 2007 (age 19)	0	0	(Belgium) Liège	v. Bulgaria, 6 October 2026
FW	Edvin Muratović	15 February 1997 (age 29)	22	1	(Lithuania) Panevėžys	v. Albania, 6 June 2026
FW	Alessio Curci	16 February 2002 (age 24)	20	1	(Azerbaijan) Neftçi	v. Albania, 6 June 2026
FW	Leon Elshan	22 September 2004 (age 22)	0	0	(Luxembourg) Jeunesse Esch	v. Albania, 6 June 2026
FW	Yvandro Borges Sanches	24 May 2004 (age 22)	29	3	(Netherlands) Heracles Almelo	v. Italy, 3 June 2026^{INJ}
Notes: ^{PRE} = Preliminary squad/standby.; ^{INJ} = Not part of the current squad due to injury.; ^{WD} = Player withdrew from the current squad due to non-injury issue.; ^{U21} = Player joined under-21 team after opening game of window.

== Player records ==
As of 16 November 2026

Players in bold are still active with Luxembourg.

=== Most capped players ===
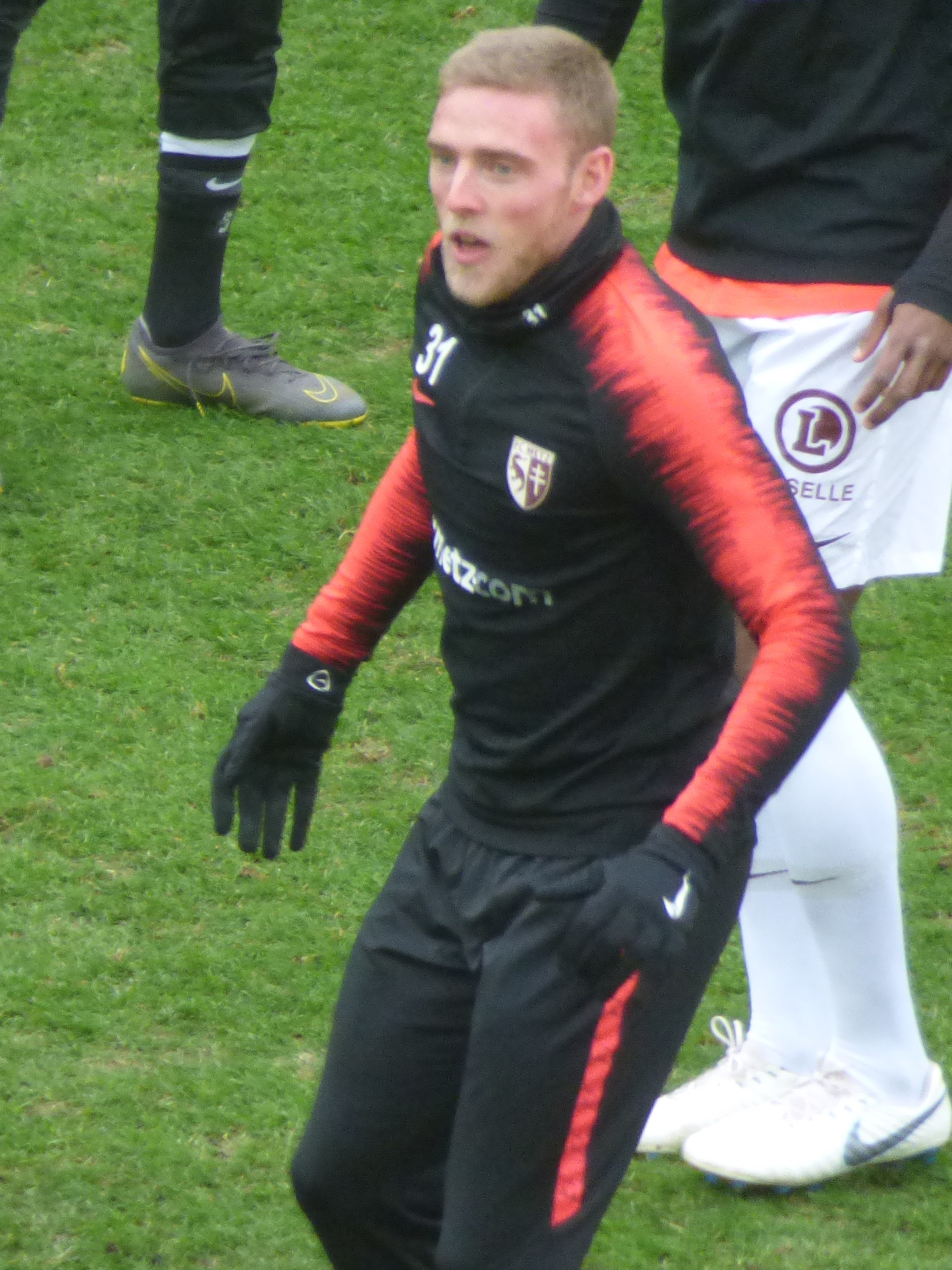
Laurent Jans is Luxembourg's most capped player with 128 appearances.

Rank	Player	Caps	Goals	Years
1	**Laurent Jans** (Note: Laurent Jans also played in Luxembourg's match against Belgium in 2014, but Belgium used seven substitutions, rendering the match unofficial according to FIFA regulations.)	128	1	2012–present
2	Mario Mutsch (Note: Mario Mutsch also played in Luxembourg's match against Belgium in 2014, but Belgium used seven substitutions, rendering the match unofficial according to FIFA regulations.)	102	4	2005–2019
3	Daniel da Mota (Note: Daniel da Mota also played in Luxembourg's match against Belgium in 2014, but Belgium used seven substitutions, rendering the match unofficial according to FIFA regulations.)	100	7	2007–2021
3	**Lars Gerson** (Note: Lars Gerson also played in Luxembourg's match against Belgium in 2014, but Belgium used 7 substitutions, rendering the match unofficial according to FIFA regulations.)	100	4	2008–present
5	Jeff Strasser	98	7	1993–2010
6	René Peters (Note: René Peters also played and scored against Faroe Islands in 2004, but this was not recognised as a full A-international by FIFA.)	92	3	2000–2013
7	Jonathan Joubert	90	0	2006–2017
8	Eric Hoffmann (Note: Eric Hoffmann also played and scored against Faroe Islands in 2004, but this was not recognised as a full senior international match by FIFA.)	88	0	2002–2014
8	**Anthony Moris**	88	0	2014–present
10	Carlo Weis (Note: Carlo Weis also played in three matches against France Amateur, West Germany B and France B, but these are not recognised as full senior international matches by FIFA.)	85	1	1978–1998

=== Top goalscorers ===
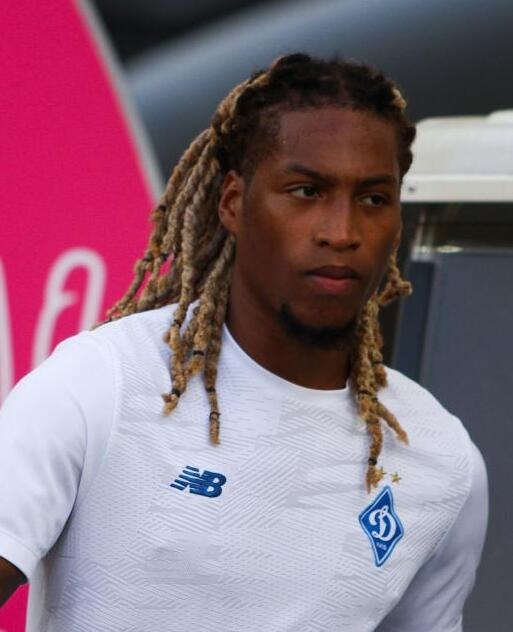
Gerson Rodrigues is Luxembourg's top scorer with 23 goals.

Rank	Player	Goals	Caps	Ratio	Career
1	Gerson Rodrigues	23	72	0.32	2017–2025
2	Léon Mart	16	24	0.67	1933–1945
2	**Danel Sinani**	16	83	0.19	2017–present
4	Gustave Kemp (Note: Gustave Kemp also played a match at the 1936 Summer Olympics, but this was not recognised as a full senior international match by FIFA.)	15	20	0.75	1938–1945
4	Aurélien Joachim (Note: Aurélien Joachim also played and scored in Luxembourg's match against Belgium in 2014, but Belgium used seven substitutions, rendering the match unofficial according to FIFA regulations.)	15	80	0.19	2005–2019
6	Camille Libar	14	24	0.58	1938–1947
7	Nicolas Kettel (Note: Nicolas Kettel also played and scored at the 1948 Summer Olympics, however these matches are not recognised as full A-internationals by FIFA.)	13	56	0.23	1946–1959
8	François Müller (Note: François Müller also played at the 1952 Summer Olympics, however these matches are not recognised as full A-internationals by FIFA.)	12	27	0.44	1949–1954
9	Léon Letsch	11	48	0.23	1947–1963
10	Gilbert Dussier	9	39	0.23	1971–1978

== Competitive record ==
=== FIFA World Cup ===
FIFA World Cup record									Qualification record					
Year	Round	Position	Pld	W	D*	L	GF	GA	Pld	W	D	L	GF	GA
(Uruguay) 1930	Did not enter								Declined invitation					
(Italy) 1934	Did not qualify								2	0	0	2	2	15
(France) 1938	Did not qualify								2	0	0	2	2	7
(Brazil) 1950	Did not qualify								2	0	0	2	4	8
(Switzerland) 1954	Did not qualify								4	0	0	4	1	19
(Sweden) 1958	Did not qualify								4	0	0	4	3	19
(Chile) 1962	Did not qualify								4	1	0	3	5	21
(England) 1966	Did not qualify								6	0	0	6	6	20
(Mexico) 1970	Did not qualify								6	0	0	6	4	24
(West Germany) 1974	Did not qualify								6	1	0	5	2	14
(Argentina) 1978	Did not qualify								6	0	0	6	2	22
(Spain) 1982	Did not qualify								8	0	0	8	1	23
(Mexico) 1986	Did not qualify								8	0	0	8	2	27
(Italy) 1990	Did not qualify								8	0	1	7	3	22
(United States) 1994	Did not qualify								8	0	1	7	2	17
(France) 1998	Did not qualify								8	0	0	8	2	22
(South Korea) (Japan) 2002	Did not qualify								10	0	0	10	4	28
(Germany) 2006	Did not qualify								12	0	0	12	5	48
(South Africa) 2010	Did not qualify								10	1	2	7	4	25
(Brazil) 2014	Did not qualify								10	1	3	6	7	26
(Russia) 2018	Did not qualify								10	1	3	6	8	26
(Qatar) 2022	Did not qualify								8	3	0	5	8	18
(Canada) (Mexico) (United States) 2026	Did not qualify								6	0	0	6	1	13
(Morocco) (Portugal) (Spain) 2030	To be determined								To be determined					
(Saudi Arabia) 2034	To be determined								To be determined					
Total	—	0/23	—	—	—	—	—	—	148	8	10	130	78	464

=== UEFA European Championship ===
UEFA European Championship record									Qualifying record					
Year	Round	Position	Pld	W	D*	L	GF	GA	Pld	W	D	L	GF	GA
(France) 1960	Did not enter								Declined participation					
(Spain) 1964	Did not qualify								5	1	3	1	8	8
(Italy) 1968	Did not qualify								6	0	1	5	1	18
(Belgium) 1972	Did not qualify								6	0	1	5	1	23
(Socialist Federal Republic of Yugoslavia) 1976	Did not qualify								6	0	0	6	7	28
(Italy) 1980	Did not qualify								6	0	1	5	2	17
(France) 1984	Did not qualify								8	0	0	8	5	36
(West Germany) 1988	Did not qualify								8	0	1	7	2	23
(Sweden) 1992	Did not qualify								6	0	0	6	2	14
(England) 1996	Did not qualify								10	3	1	6	3	21
(Belgium) (Netherlands) 2000	Did not qualify								8	0	0	8	2	23
(Portugal) 2004	Did not qualify								8	0	0	8	0	21
(Austria) (Switzerland) 2008	Did not qualify								12	1	0	11	2	23
(Poland) (Ukraine) 2012	Did not qualify								10	1	1	8	3	21
(France) 2016	Did not qualify								10	1	1	8	6	27
(European Union) 2020	Did not qualify								8	1	1	6	7	16
(Germany) 2024	Did not qualify								11	5	2	4	13	21
(United Kingdom) (Republic of Ireland) 2028	To be determined								To be determined					
(Italy) (Turkey) 2032	To be determined								To be determined					
Total	—	0/17	—	—	—	—	—	—	128	13	13	102	64	340

=== UEFA Nations League ===
UEFA Nations League record
League phase												Promotion/Relegation play-offs					
Season	Division	Group	Pos	Pld	W	D	L	GF	GA	P/R	RK	Pld	W	D	L	GF	GA
2018–19	D	2	2nd	6	3	1	2	11	4	▲	44th	—N/a					
2020–21	C	1	2nd	6	3	1	2	7	5	Same position	39th	—N/a					
2022–23	C	1	2nd	6	3	2	1	9	7	Same position	37th	—N/a					
2024–25	C	3	4th	6	0	3	3	3	7	Same position	46th	2	2	0	0	5	0
2026–27	C	4	4th	6	1	0	5	2	11	Same position	46th	—N/a					
Total				30	10	7	13	32	34	37th		2	2	0	0	5	0

=== Olympic Games ===
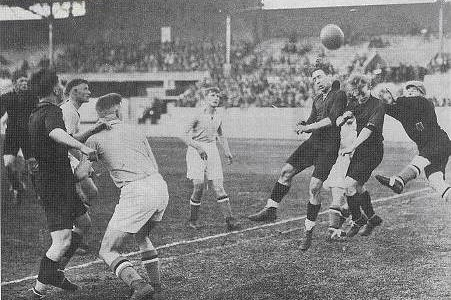
Hectic phase during the goal-rich Olympic defeat against Belgium in 1928 (5–3)

Olympic Games record
Year	Round	Pld	W	D	L	GF	GA	Squad
(Belgium) 1920	Round 1	1	0	0	1	0	3	Squad
(France) 1924	Round 2	1	0	0	1	0	2	Squad
(Netherlands) 1928	Round 1	1	0	0	1	3	5	Squad
(Nazi Germany) 1936	Round 1	1	0	0	1	0	9	Squad
(United Kingdom) 1948	Round 1	2	1	0	1	7	6	Squad
(Finland) 1952	Round 1	2	1	0	1	6	5	Squad
Total		8	2	0	6	16	30	—

== Head to head record ==
As of 16 November 2026 after the match against Iceland, the Luxembourg national team playing record is as follows:

Opponent	P	W	D	L
Afghanistan	1	1	0	0
Albania	8	3	1	4
Algeria	1	0	1	0
Armenia	1	0	1	0
Austria	7	0	0	7
Azerbaijan	7	3	3	1
Belarus	14	2	5	7
Belgium	20	1	3	16
Bosnia and Herzegovina	9	2	0	7
Bulgaria	19	1	3	15
Cameroon	1	0	0	1
Canada	2	0	0	2
Cape Verde	4	0	3	1
Cyprus	5	1	0	4
Czech Republic	2	1	0	1
Czechoslovakia	7	0	1	6
Denmark	11	0	2	9
East Germany	5	0	0	5
Egypt	1	0	1	0
England	9	0	0	9
Estonia	5	0	1	4
Faroe Islands	6	1	2	3
Finland	5	1	0	4
France	19	1	1	17
Gambia	1	1	0	0
Georgia	5	1	1	3
Germany	15	1	0	14
Greece	9	1	0	8
Hungary	11	1	1	9
Iceland	11	1	4	6
Israel	9	0	0	9
Italy	10	0	1	9
Japan	1	0	0	1
Kazakhstan	1	1	0	0
Latvia	7	0	1	6
Liechtenstein	6	2	1	3
Lithuania	6	4	1	1
Madagascar	1	0	1	0
Malta	9	5	2	2
Mexico	1	1	0	0
Moldova	6	1	4	1
Montenegro	3	1	0	2
Morocco	3	0	0	3
Myanmar	1	0	0	1
Netherlands	18	2	1	15
Nigeria	1	0	0	1
Northern Ireland	9	1	2	6
North Macedonia	4	2	0	2
Norway	12	2	1	9
Poland	7	0	1	6
Portugal	21	1	1	19
Qatar	2	0	1	1
Republic of Ireland	8	1	1	6
Romania	6	0	0	6
Russia	10	0	0	10
San Marino	2	2	0	0
Saudi Arabia	1	0	0	1
Scotland	5	0	1	4
Senegal	1	0	1	0
Serbia	4	0	0	4
Serbia and Montenegro	2	0	0	2
Slovakia	9	1	1	7
Slovenia	5	0	0	5
South Korea	2	1	0	1
Soviet Union	1	0	0	1
Spain	6	0	0	6
Sweden	7	1	1	5
Switzerland	13	1	1	11
Togo	1	0	1	0
Turkey	9	1	1	7
Ukraine	5	0	0	5
United States	1	0	0	1
Uruguay	1	0	0	1
Wales	6	0	0	6
Yugoslavia	9	0	1	8

== See also ==
- Luxembourg men's national under-21 football team
- Luxembourg men's national under-19 football team
- Luxembourg men's national under-17 football team
- Luxembourg women's national football team
