= 2025–26 Luxembourg Cup =

Tournament details
- Country: Luxembourg
- Teams: 100

Final positions
- Champions: Differdange 03
- Runners-up: Victoria Rosport

Tournament statistics
- Matches played: 99
- Goals scored: 445 (4.49 per match)
- All statistics correct as of 8 August 2025.

The 2025–26 Luxembourg Cup, also known as Loterie Nationale Coupe de Luxembourg, for sponsorship reasons, is the 101st year of the football knockout tournament in Luxembourg. The winners will qualify for the 2026–27 Conference League second qualifying round.

The competition began on 3 September 2025 and ends with the final, played at the Stade de Luxembourg, in May 2026. Differdange are the defending champions.

== Preliminary round ==
The draw for the preliminary round was made on 8 August 2025, along with the draw for the first round.

Team 1	Score	Team 2
3 September 2025
Biekerech (5)	3–2	Red Boys Aspelt (4)
Reisdorf (5)	2–2 (a.e.t.) (4–2 p)	Erpeldange 72 (4)
Excelsior Grevels (5)	0–5	Kiischpelt Wilwerwiltz (5)
Tricolore Gasperich (4)	3–1	Union 05 Kayl-Tétange (4)

== First round ==
The draw for the first round was made on 8 August 2025, along with the draw for the preliminary round.

Number of teams per tier still in competition
National League (Note: National League and Division of Honour teams will join the competition in the second round.)	Division of Honour	1. Division	2. Division	3. Division	Total
16 / 16	16 / 16	32 / 32	25 / 28	7 / 8	96 / 100

Team 1	Score	Team 2
3 September 2025
Syra Mensdorf (3)	4–2	Green Boys (4)
5 September 2025
Minière Lasauvage (4)	3–1	ES Clemency (4)
Orania Vianden (4)	2–4	Minerva Lintgen (3)
6 September 2025
Boevange-Attert (4)	1–2	Schengen (3)
Noertzange HF (4)	2–0	Pratzerthal-Redange (4)
Racing Heiderscheid-Eschdorf (4)	6–0	Claravallis Clervaux (4)
US Esch (4)	1–4	Munsbach (3)
Les Aiglons Dalheim (4)	3–2	Bourscheid (4)
Bastendorf 47 (3)	0–3	CS Oberkorn (3)
Biekerech (5)	0–9	Grevenmacher (3)
Olympia Christnach-Waldbillig (4)	5–0	SC Ell (4)
Schouweiler (4)	1–4	Kehlen (3)
Blo-Wäiss Medernach (3)	3–1	Hosingen (3)
Jeunesse Biwer (4)	2–0	Red Star Merl-Belair (3)
Colmarberg (5)	1–4	Tricolore Gasperich (4)
Kiischpelt Wilwerwiltz (5)	0–4	Moutfort-Medingen (4)
Union Mertert-Wasserbillig (3)	3–4	Jeunesse Gilsdorf (3)
URB (3)	3–1	Jeunesse Useldange (3)
Luna Oberkorn (5)	1–7	Yellow Boys Weiler-la-Tour (3)
AS Red Black Luxembourg (4)	3–1 (a.e.t.)	Rupensia Lusitanos Larochette (3)
Brouch (5)	1–10	Jeunesse Junglinster (3)
Sanem (3)	3–1	Alliance Äischdall (3)
Reisdorf (5)	1–7	Daring Echternach (3)
Les Ardoisiers Perlé (5)	1–7	Käerch (3)
Rambrouch (4)	1–6	Sporting Mertzig (3)
Ehlerange (4)	1–0	Sporting Bertrange (3)
Young Boys Diekirch (3)	0–2	Kopstal 33 (3)
Berdorf-Consdorf (4)	1–9	Jeunesse Schieren (3)
Racing Troisvierges (4)	0–5	Norden 02 (3)
Blo Waiss Itzig (3)	1–2 (a.e.t.)	Avenir Beggen (3)
Folschette (4)	1–0	FC Stengefort (4)
Sandweiler (3)	1–0	Wincrange (3)

== Second round ==
The draw for the second round was made on 11 September. This round sees clubs from the National Division and Division of Honour join the competition, where they are drawn as the away side against a team from a lower tier.

Number of teams per tier still in competition
National League	Division of Honour	1. Division	2. Division	3. Division	Total
16 / 16	16 / 16	21 / 32	11 / 28	0 / 8	64 / 100

Team 1	Score	Team 2
19 September 2025
CS Oberkorn (3)	0–3	Swift Hesperange (1)
Syra Mensdorf (3)	0–3	Progrès Niederkorn (1)
Differdange 03 (1)	9–0	Ehlerange (4)
Sandweiler (3)	2–5	Jeunesse Canach (1)
20 September 2025
URB (3)	1–3	F91 Dudelange (1)
Racing Heiderscheid-Eschdorf (4)	0–4	Hostert (1)
Jeunesse Schieren (3)	0–4	Union Titus Pétange (1)
Grevenmacher (3)	0–3	UNA Strassen (1)
21 September 2025
Avenir Beggen (3)	2–3	Rumelange (2)
Norden 02 (3)	1–4	Mondercange (2)
Jeunesse Junglinster (3)	2–6	SC Bettembourg (2)
Noertzange HF (4)	0–9	Atert Bissen (1)
Yellow Boys Weiler-la-Tour (3)	3–2	Schifflange 95 (2)
Berdenia Berbourg (2)	1–1 (a.e.t.) (3–1 p)	Kopstal 33 (3)
Käerch (3)	2–0 (a.e.t.)	Koeppchen Wormeldange (2)
Kehlen (3)	2–3	Etzella Ettelbruck (2)
Tricolore Gasperich (4)	0–1	Lorentzweiler (2)
Minerva Lintgen (3)	0–3	Käerjéng (1)
Schengen (3)	2–4	FC Luxembourg City (2)
Folschette (4)	0–5	Rodange (1)
Moutfort-Medingen (4)	2–3	Victoria Rosport (1)
Les Aiglons Dalheim (4)	2–6	The Belval Belvaux (2)
Minière Lasauvage (4)	2–4	Feulen (2)
Sporting Mertzig (3)	2–3	Alisontia Steinsel (2)
Jeunesse Gilsdorf (3)	1–2 (a.e.t.)	Mamer 32 (1)
Blo-Wäiss Medernach (3)	1–1 (a.e.t.) (3–5 p)	Jeunesse Esch (1)
Olympia Christnach-Waldbillig (4)	2–6	Wiltz (2)
Sanem (3)	1–6	Mondorf-les-Bains (1)
Jeunesse Biwer (4)	1–4	Fola Esch (2)
AS Red Black Luxembourg (4)	2–4 (a.e.t.)	Marisca Mersch (2)
Munsbach (3)	3–1	Résidence Walferdange (2)
Daring Echternach (3)	0–7	Racing FC (1)

== Round of 32 ==
The draw for the Round of 32 was made on 26 September 2025

Number of teams per tier still in competition
National League	Division of Honour	1. Division	2. Division	3. Division	Total
16 / 16	13 / 16	3 / 32	0 / 28	0 / 8	32 / 100

Team 1	Score	Team 2
7 November 2025
Progrès Niederkorn (1)	1–0	Jeunesse Esch (1)
9 November 2025
F91 Dudelange (1)	1–4 (a.e.t.)	Atert Bissen (1)
Etzella Ettelbruck (2)	2–2 (a.e.t.) (2–4 p)	Racing FC (1)
Mondercange (2)	2–3	Victoria Rosport (1)
Swift Hesperange (1)	0–3	Hostert (1)
Lorentzweiler (2)	2–4	Rodange (1)
Munsbach (3)	2–3	Jeunesse Canach (1)
Käerch (3)	0–2	FC Luxembourg City (2)
The Belval Belvaux (2)	2–4	UNA Strassen (1)
Differdange 03 (1)	2–1	Union Titus Pétange (1)
Yellow Boys Weiler-la-Tour (3)	1–2	Alisontia Steinsel (2)
Feulen (2)	2–1 (a.e.t.)	SC Bettembourg (2)
Mamer 32 (1)	2–0	Käerjéng (1)
Rumelange (2)	2–4 (a.e.t.) (Note: After the match between Rumelange and Fola Esch which ended 2–4 after extra time, Rumelange had filed a complaint that during the match the assistant referee had incorrectly informed them that during the extra time, they were only allowed to make a substitution at halftime, which is incorrect according to the rules of the game. The Federal Court had hence ordered the game to be replayed, after which Fola Esch launched an appeal, citing that Rumelange had not requested a substitution and consequently had not been refused one. The appeal went in their favor, which meant the result stood, and Fola Esch was allowed to progress.)	Fola Esch (2)
Wiltz (2)	6–0	Marisca Mersch (2)
Berdenia Berbourg (2)	0–2	Mondorf-les-Bains (1)

== Round of 16 ==
The draw for the Round of 16 was made on 21 November.

Number of teams per tier still in competition
National League	Division of Honour	1. Division	2. Division	3. Division	Total
11 / 16	5 / 16	0 / 32	0 / 28	0 / 8	16 / 100

Team 1	Score	Team 2
4 March 2026
Differdange 03 (1)	4–3 (a.e.t.)	UNA Strassen (1)
Feulen (2)	1–0	Alisontia Steinsel (2)
Atert Bissen (1)	2–1	Mondorf-les-Bains (1)
Fola Esch (2)	3–1	Hostert (1)
FC Luxembourg City (2)	0–2	Rodange (1)
Racing Union (1)	3–2 (a.e.t.)	Jeunesse Canach (1)
Wiltz (2)	0–1	Progrès Niederkorn (1)
Mamer 32 (1)	2–3	Victoria Rosport (1)

== Quarter-finals ==
The draw for the quarter- and semi-finals was made on 16 March.

Number of teams per tier still in competition
National League	Division of Honour	1. Division	2. Division	3. Division	Total
6 / 16	2 / 16	0 / 32	0 / 28	0 / 9	8 / 101

22 April 2026	Fola Esch (2)	0–1	Rodange (1)

22 April 2026	Atert Bissen (1)	1–2	Progrès Niederkorn (1)

22 April 2026	Differdange 03 (1)	2–0	Racing Union (1)

22 April 2026	Feulen (2)	1–2	Victoria Rosport (1)

== Semi-finals ==
The draw for the semi-finals was made on 16 March. Only teams from the National Division (top tier) remain in the competition.

13 May 2026	Differdange 03 (1)	1–1 (a.e.t.) (7–6 p)	Rodange (1)	Differdange
20:00	Bruninho 70'	Report	Schur 90+6'	Stadium: Parc des Sports
	Penalties
	Leandro (penalty scored); Brusco (penalty scored); Bruninho (penalty scored); Mendy (penalty scored); Buch (penalty scored); Bedouret (penalty scored); Franzoni (penalty scored)		(penalty scored) Schur; (penalty scored) Messuwe; (penalty scored) Torres; (penalty scored) Bojić; (penalty scored) Caradonna; (penalty scored) Muzhaqi; (penalty missed) Skenderović

13 May 2026	Progrès Niederkorn (1)	2–2 (a.e.t.) (1–4 p)	Victoria Rosport (1)	Niederkorn
20:00	Duarte 21'; Corral 62'	Report	Marques 87'; Ferreira 89'	Stadium: Stade Jos Haupert
	Penalties
	Sacras (penalty missed); Bouché (penalty scored); Hoxha (penalty missed)		(penalty scored) Steinbach; (penalty scored) Brkljača; (penalty scored) Marques; (penalty scored) Villeneuve

== Final ==
29 May 2026	Differdange 03 (1)	4–1	Victoria Rosport (1)	Luxembourg City
19:30	Abreu 7', 54'; Buch 43'; Hadji 70' (pen.)	Report	Kyereh 64'	Stadium: Stade de Luxembourg; Referee: Jasmin Sabotic
