= 2014–15 Luxembourg Cup =

Tournament details
- Country: Luxembourg

Final positions
- Champions: Differdange 03
- Runners-up: F91 Dudelange

The 2014–15 Luxembourg Cup was the 90th season of Luxembourg's annual football cup competition. It began on 30 August 2013 with Round 1 and the final was played 31 May 2015. Differdange 03 were the defending champions and successfully defended their title. This made Differdange 03 qualify for the first qualifying round of the 2015–16 UEFA Europa League.

== Round 1 ==
The games were played on 30 & 31 August 2014.

Team 1	Score	Team 2
Pratzerthal-Redange (4)	2−4	AS Hosingen (4)
Moutfort/Medingen (4)	3–2	Jeunesse Gilsdorf (4)
SC Ell (4)	1−0 (a.e.t.)	Sporting Mertzig (4)
Les Aiglons Dalheim (5)	2–0	Vinesca Ehnen (5)
Tricolore Gasperich (4)	1–13	Munsbach (4)
Bourscheid (5)	0−4	Feulen (4)
Syra Mensdorf (4)	2−0	Les Ardoisiers Perlé (5)
Young Boys Diekirch (4)	5−0	Jeunesse Biwer (4)
The Belval Belvaux (4)	2–0	Olympia Christnach/Waldbillig (4)
Racing Troisvierges (4)	5−3	Blo-Weiss Itzig (4)
Koerich/Simmern (5)	1−4	Ehlerange (5)
CeBra 01 (4)	0−2	Luxembourg-Porto (4)
Daring-Club Echternach (4)	5−1	Etoile Sportive Schouweiler (5)
Alisontia Steinsel (4)	12−0	Claravallis Clervaux (5)
Colmar-Berg (4)	3−1	Kischpelt Wilwerwiltz (5)
Red Star Merl-Belair (4)	2–1	Red Boys Aspelt (4)
Noertzange (5)	3−0	Rupensia Lusitanos - Larochette (4)

== Round 2 ==
The games were played on 14 September 2014.

Team 1	Score	Team 2
Racing Heiderscheid/Eschdorf (5)	3−7	Red Star Merl-Belair (4)
Feulen (4)	4−2	Ehlerange (5)
Rambrouch (5)	0−4	Colmar-Berg (4)
Young Boys Diekirch (4)	4−1	Daring-Club Echternach (4)
Kopstal 33 (5)	0−8	Sanem (4)
Syra Mensdorf (4)	1−0	Etoile Sportive Clemency (5)
Sporting Beckerich (5)	2−4 (a.e.t.)	Schengen (5)
Excelsior Grevels (5)	2−2 (a.e.t.) (4−5 p)	Jeunesse Useldingen (4)
Moutfort/Medingen (4)	0−8	Munsbach (4)
SC Ell (4)	4−0	Racing Troisvierges (4)
Blo-Weiss Medernach (4)	5−0	Folschette (5)
Noertzange (5)	3−0 (awarded)	Les Aiglons Dalheim (5)
Luxembourg-Porto (4)	0−0 (a.e.t.) (3−2 p)	Minière Lasauvage (5)
Red Blach/Egalité 07 (4)	1−3	AS Hosingen (4)
Reisdorf (5)	0−0 (a.e.t.) (1−4 p)	The Belval Belvaux (4)
Alisontia Steinsel (4)	7−1	Brouch (5)

== Round 3 ==
The games were played on 5 October 2014.

Team 1	Score	Team 2
Young Boys Diekirch (4)	2−1	FC Koeppchen Wormeldange (3)
Schifflange 95 (3)	2−1 (a.e.t.)	US Esch (3)
Colmar-Berg (4)	2−5	Berdorf Consdorf (3)
Syra Mensdorf (4)	2−4	Orania Vianden (3)
The Belval Belvaux (4)	1−2	Sporting Bertrange (3)
Munsbach (4)	1−0 (a.e.t.)	Sanem (4)
Union Mertert-Wasserbillig (3)	5−1	Noertzange (5)
SC Ell (4)	0−4 (a.e.t.)	Alisontia Steinsel (4)
Berdenia Berbourg (3)	4−1 (a.e.t.)	FC 47 Bastendorf (3)
FC Lorentzweiler (3)	6−6 (a.e.t.) (9−11 p)	URB (3)
FF Norden 02 (3)	3−4	Jeunesse Junglinster (3)
Avenir Beggen (3)	7−0	Schengen (5)
Marisca Mersch (3)	4−0	Sporting Bettembourg (3)
Luxembourg-Porto (4)	1−2	AS Hosingen (4)
Kehlen (3)	1−0	Feulen (4)
Yellow Boys Weiler (3)	3−1	FC Jeunesse Schieren (3)
Red Star Merl-Belair (4)	1−3	Blo-Weiss Medernach (4)
Jeunesse Useldingen (4)	0−3	Oberkorn (3)
Wincrange (3)	1−0	FC Green Boys 77 Harlange-Tarchamps (3)
US Boevange/Attert (3)	0−2	Atert Bissen (3)
FC Luna Obercorn (3)	0−4	Résidence Walferdange (3)
Sporting Club Steinfort (3)	1−4	Alliance Äischdall (3)

== Round 4 ==
The games were played on 31 October, 1 and 2 November 2014.

Team 1	Score	Team 2
UNA Strassen (2)	2–1 (a.e.t.)	Alisontia Steinsel (4)
Titus Lamadelaine (2)	4–0	Blo-Weiss Medernach (4)
Mamer 32 (2)	2–5	Minerva Lintgen (2)
Sandweiler (2)	3–2 (a.e.t.)	Union Mertert-Wasserbillig (3)
Erpeldange 72 (2)	0–1	Atert Bissen (3)
Sporting Bertrange (3)	3–2	Jeunesse Junglinster (3)
Alliance Äischdall (3)	2–4 (a.e.t.)	Union Luxembourg (2)
Yellow Boys Weiler (3)	1–4	URB (3)
Orania Vianden (3)	1–2	Wincrange (3)
Kehlen (3)	0–2	Berdenia Berbourg (3)
Blue Boys Muhlenbach (2)	3–2	Mondercange (2)
Rodange 91 (2)	3–0	Union 05 Kayl-Tétange (2)
Swift Hesperange (2)	5–0	Young Boys Diekirch (4)
Marisca Mersch (3)	3–1	Résidence Walferdange (3)
Oberkorn (3)	2–2 (4–5 p)	Munsbach (4)
Avenir Beggen (3)	3–0	AS Hosingen (4)
Schifflange 95 (3)	2–1	Berdorf Consdorf (3)
RM Hamm Benfica (2)	3–0	Pétange (2)

== Round 5 ==
The games were played on 28, 29, 30 November and 3 December 2014.

Team 1	Score	Team 2
Schifflange 95 (3)	0–1 (a.e.t.)	Rumelange (1)
Munsbach (4)	0–2	Mondorf-les-Bains (1)
Berdenia Berbourg (3)	0–4	F91 Dudelange (1)
Sandweiler (2)	0–5	Hostert (1)
URB (3)	1–4	Differdange 03 (1)
UNA Strassen (2)	4–2	Progrès Niederkorn (1)
Swift Hesperange (2)	1–0	Titus Lamadelaine (2)
Sporting Bertrange (3)	1–3	Grevenmacher (1)
RM Hamm Benfica (2)	2–1	Jeunesse Esch (1)
Union Luxembourg (2)	3–0	Victoria Rosport (1)
Blue Boys Muhlenbach (2)	0–4	Rodange 91 (2)
Minerva Lintgen (2)	1–4	Wiltz 71 (1)
Marisca Mersch (3)	1−1 (a.e.t.) (3−5 p)	Käerjéng 97 (1)
Avenir Beggen (3)	1−1 (a.e.t.) (2−3 p)	Jeunesse Canach (1)
Wincrange (3)	1–2	Etzella Ettelbruck (1)
Atert Bissen (3)	1–4	Fola Esch (1)

== Round 6 ==
The sixteen winners of Round 5 competed in this round. The games were played on 7 December 2014.

Team 1	Score	Team 2
Hostert (1)	0–2	Etzella Ettelbruck (1)
Mondorf-les-Bains (1)	2−4 (a.e.t.)	Fola Esch (1)
Jeunesse Canach (1)	3–1	Käerjéng 97 (1)
Union Luxembourg (2)	0–2	RM Hamm Benfica (2)
Swift Hesperange (2)	0−3	Grevenmacher (1)
UNA Strassen (2)	0−1	F91 Dudelange (1)
Rodange 91 (2)	0−3	Differdange 03 (1)
Wiltz 71 (1)	3−4 (a.e.t.)	Rumelange (1)

== Quarter-finals ==
All matches were played 4 April 2015.

Team 1	Score	Team 2
Rumelange (1)	2–5	Differdange 03 (1)
Jeunesse Canach (1)	0–0 (a.e.t.) (4−2 p)	RM Hamm Benfica (2)
Grevenmacher (1)	1−2 (a.e.t.)	Etzella Ettelbruck (1)
Fola Esch (1)	1–3	F91 Dudelange (1)

== Semi-finals ==
All matches were played 14 May 2015.

Team 1	Score	Team 2
Differdange 03	3–2	Jeunesse Canach
F91 Dudelange	4–0	Etzella Ettelbruck

== Final ==
The match was played on 31 May 2015.

31 May 2015
17:00 CEST

Differdange 03	1–1 (a.e.t.)	F91 Dudelange
Joubert 22' (o.g.)		Siebenaler 20' (o.g.)
Penalties
Caron (penalty scored); Rodrigues (penalty scored); Franzoni (penalty scored); Siebenaler (penalty missed)	3–2	(penalty missed) Malget; (penalty scored) Pedro; (penalty missed) Maury; (penalty scored) Jahier; (penalty missed) Benajiba

Stade Josy Barthel
Attendance: 2,566
Referee: Laurent Kopriwa
