= 2024–25 Luxembourg Cup =

100th edition of the Luxembourg Cup

Tournament details
- Country: Luxembourg
- Teams: 100

Final positions
- Champions: Differdange 03 (6th title)
- Runners-up: F91 Dudelange

Tournament statistics
- Matches played: 99
- Goals scored: 468 (4.73 per match)
- All statistics correct as of 14 May 2025.

The 2024–25 Luxembourg Cup, also known as Loterie Nationale Coupe de Luxembourg, for sponsorship reasons, was the 100th year of the football knockout tournament in Luxembourg. The winners qualified for the 2025–26 Conference League second qualifying round.

Differdange 03 won the cup (their 21st Luxembourg Cup win and 6th as "Differdange 03"), defeating F91 Dudelange 5–4 on penalties in the final after a 2–2 draw. Since they qualified for the Conference League based on league position, the spot for winning the cup was passed to the second-placed team of the 2024–25 Luxembourg National Division.

== Preliminary round ==
The draw for the preliminary round was made on 12 August 2024, along with the draw for the first round.

Team 1	Score	Team 2
4 September 2024
Olympia Christnach-Waldbillig (4)	2–1	Kopstal 33 (4)
Bourscheid (5)	5–2	Luna Oberkorn (4)
Reisdorf (4)	0–1	AS Luxembourg (4)
Sporting Bertrange (4)	3–1	Les Aiglons Dalheim (4)
Les Ardoisiers Perlé (5)	2–4	ES Clemency (4)

== First round ==
The draw for the first round was made on 12 August 2024, along with the draw for the preliminary round.

Number of teams per tier still in competition
National League (Note: National League and Division of Honour teams will join the competition in the second round.)	Division of Honour	1. Division	2. Division	3. Division	Total
16 / 16	16 / 16	32 / 32	24 / 28	8 / 9	96 / 101

Team 1	Score	Team 2
4 September 2024
Union Mertert-Wasserbillig (4)	4–1	SC Ell (4)
6 September 2024
Folschette (4)	2–1	Munsbach (3)
7 September 2024
Biekerech (5)	1–13	Bastendorf 47 (3)
Olympia Christnach-Waldbillig (4)	1–5	Yellow Boys Weiler-la-Tour (3)
Schouweiler (4)	3–5	Ehlerange (3)
Kehlen (3)	1–5	The Belval Belvaux (3)
Pratzerthal-Redange (4)	4–5	Union Kayl-Tétange (3)
Moutfort-Medingen (4)	4–0	Jeunesse Gilsdorf (3)
Käerch (3)	3–4	Young Boys Diekirch (3)
Rupensia Lusitanos Larochette (4)	5–3	Hosingen (3)
Claravallis Clervaux (5)	0–2	Red Boys Aspelt (5)
Excelsior Grevels (5)	1–8	Schengen (3)
Wincrange (4)	3–4 (a.e.t.)	Alliance Äischdall (3)
Minière Lasauvage (4)	0–1	Steinfort (3)
Bourscheid (5)	0–7	Jeunesse Schieren (3)
Racing Heiderscheid-Eschdorf (4)	0–3	Orania Vianden (3)
Rambrouch (4)	1–2	AS Luxembourg (4)
Jeunesse Biwer (4)	2–3	Sporting Bertrange (4)
US Esch (5)	1–4	Daring Echternach (3)
Noertzange HF (4)	1–4	Sporting Mertzig (3)
Grevenmacher (3)	1–2	Blo-Wäiss Medernach (3)
Sanem (3)	1–2	URB (3)
Racing Troisvierges (4)	2–4	Lorentzweiler (3)
Tricolore Gasperich (4)	2–4	Colmarberg (4)
Brouch (5)	3–5 (a.e.t.)	Blo Waiss Itzig (3)
Boevange-Attert (4)	1–2	Minerva Lintgen (4)
Red Star Merl-Belair (3)	0–2	Syra Mensdorf (3)
CS Oberkorn (4)	1–0	Norden 02 (3)
Kiischpelt Wilwerwiltz (5)	3–5	Red Black Egalité (3)
Jeunesse Useldange (3)	3–1	Berdorf-Consdorf (3)
ES Clemency (4)	3–1	Green Boys (4)
Jeunesse Junglinster (3)	3–1	72 Erpeldange (3)

== Second round ==
The draw for the second round was made on 16 September 2024. This round saw clubs from the National Division and Division of Honour join the competition. This round of the cup saw only 1 club from the 3. Division remaining, Red Boys Aspelt, who were defeated by National Ligue side, Progrès Niederkorn.

Number of teams per tier still in competition
National League	Division of Honour	1. Division	2. Division	3. Division	Total
16 / 16	16 / 16	21 / 32	10 / 28	1 / 9	64 / 101

Team 1	Score	Team 2
4 October 2024
Folschette (4)	0–6	Rumelange (2)
5 October 2024
Blo-Wäiss Medernach (3)	0–4	UNA Strassen (1)
Bastendorf 47 (3)	3–2	FC Luxembourg City (2)
Alliance Äischdall (3)	2–3	Alisontia Steinsel (2)
Steinfort (3)	0–3	Swift Hesperange (1)
Orania Vianden (3)	4–3	Berdenia Berbourg (2)
Ehlerange (3)	1–3	Fola Esch (1)
6 October 2024
Colmarberg (4)	0–14	Differdange 03 (1)
Rupensia Lusitanos Larochette (4)	1–6	Mondercange (1)
Jeunesse Schieren (3)	1–3	Rodange (1)
Syra Mensdorf (3)	2–5	F91 Dudelange (1)
Union Mertert-Wasserbillig (4)	0–3	Schifflange 95 (2)
Sporting Bertrange (4)	1–7	Jeunesse Esch (1)
Red Black Egalité (3)	1–2	Käerjéng (2)
Young Boys Diekirch (3)	1–2	Résidence Walferdange (2)
Daring Echternach (3)	2–2 (a.e.t.) (3–2 p)	Etzella Ettelbruck (2)
Union Kayl-Tétange (3)	2–0	Avenir Beggen (2)
Jeunesse Junglinster (3)	2–1	Feulen (2)
Moutfort-Medingen (4)	1–4	SC Bettembourg (1)
Sporting Mertzig (3)	2–4	Union Titus Pétange (1)
Jeunesse Useldange (3)	1–3	Marisca Mersch (2)
The Belval Belvaux (3)	5–0	Sandweiler (2)
URB (3)	3–2	Koeppchen Wormeldange (2)
Schengen (3)	1–5	Hostert (1)
Red Boys Aspelt (5)	0–8	Progrès Niederkorn (1)
Minerva Lintgen (4)	1–0	Atert Bissen (2)
CS Oberkorn (4)	0–1 (a.e.t.)	Racing FC (1)
Blo Waiss Itzig (3)	0–4	Wiltz (1)
AS Luxembourg (4)	1–2	Jeunesse Canach (2)
Yellow Boys Weiler-la-Tour (3)	3–1	Mamer 32 (2)
ES Clemency (4)	0–4	Mondorf-les-Bains (1)
Lorentzweiler (3)	0–2	Victoria Rosport (1)

== Round of 32 ==
The draw for the Round of 32 was made on 9 October 2024. At this point, the final 3. Division side was knocked out, however, there was still 1 side remaining from the 2. Division remaining, being Minerva Lintgen, who defeated Division of Honour side, Atert Bissen.

Number of teams per tier still in competition
National League	Division of Honour	1. Division	2. Division	3. Division	Total
16 / 16	7 / 16	8 / 32	1 / 28	0 / 9	32 / 101

Team 1	Score	Team 2
9 November 2024
Racing FC (1)	2–0	Swift Hesperange (1)
Jeunesse Junglinster (3)	2–4	Hostert (1)
10 November 2024
Käerjéng (2)	0–0 (a.e.t.) (5–3 p)	Marisca Mersch (2)
Alisontia Steinsel (2)	0–1	Differdange 03 (1)
The Belval Belvaux (3)	Abandoned	Mondorf-les-Bains (1)
Rumelange (2)	1–3	Progrès Niederkorn (1)
Bastendorf 47 (3)	3–1 (a.e.t.)	Orania Vianden (3)
Yellow Boys Weiler-la-Tour (3)	1–0	Schifflange 95 (2)
URB (3)	2–3	F91 Dudelange (1)
Minerva Lintgen (4)	0–0 (a.e.t.) (7–6 p)	Daring Echternach (3)
Jeunesse Canach (2)	2–0	Rodange (1)
Fola Esch (1)	Abandoned	Union Titus Pétange (1)
Mondercange (1)	1–6	Wiltz (1)
Résidence Walferdange (2)	0–1	Jeunesse Esch (1)
Victoria Rosport (1)	2–0	SC Bettembourg (1)
Union Kayl-Tétange (3)	0–8	UNA Strassen (1)
20 November 2024
Fola Esch (1)	1–3	Union Titus Pétange (1)
27 November 2024
The Belval Belvaux (3)	1–0	Mondorf-les-Bains (1)

== Round of 16 ==
The draw for the Round of 16 was made on 2 December 2024. In the Round of 16, after defeating Daring Echternach on penalties, Minerva Lintgen would continue their run into the cup. It would be at this point where the 3 remaining 1. Division sides and the 2 remaining Division of Honour sides all had their runs ended, despite this, Minerva still managed to defeat The Belval Belvaux to book their place against a top-tier team in the Quarter-finals.

Number of teams per tier still in competition
National League	Division of Honour	1. Division	2. Division	3. Division	Total
10 / 16	2 / 16	3 / 32	1 / 28	0 / 9	16 / 101

Team 1	Score	Team 2
12 March 2025
Jeunesse Canach (2)	1–2	Wiltz (1)
Racing FC (1)	3–1	Victoria Rosport (1)
Bastendorf 47 (3)	1–4	F91 Dudelange (1)
Minerva Lintgen (4)	2–1	The Belval Belvaux (3)
Jeunesse Esch (1)	0–3	Progrès Niederkorn (1)
Yellow Boys Weiler-la-Tour (3)	2–7	Union Titus Pétange (1)
Hostert (1)	1–2	UNA Strassen (1)
Käerjéng (2)	0–4	Differdange 03 (1)

== Quarter-finals ==
The draw for the Quarter Final was made on 21 March. Minerva Lintgen are the only non-top flight team remaining in the competition, competing in the 4th tier.

Number of teams per tier still in competition
National League	Division of Honour	1. Division	2. Division	3. Division	Total
7 / 16	0 / 16	0 / 32	1 / 28	0 / 9	8 / 101

23 April 2025	Union Titus Pétange (1)	0–2	Differdange 03 (1)	Pétange
20:00				Stadium: Stade Municipal

23 April 2025	Minerva Lintgen (4)	0–4	Racing FC (1)	Lintgen
20:00				Stadium: Stade Jean Donnersbach

23 April 2025	F91 Dudelange (1)	4–2	UNA Strassen (1)	Dudelange
20:00				Stadium: Stade Jos Nosbaum

23 April 2025	Wiltz (1)	3–2	Progrès Niederkorn (1)	Weidingen
20:00				Stadium: Stade Am Pëtz

== Semi-finals ==
The four quarter-final winners (all from the 1st tier) entered the semi-finals. All remaining teams are from the National Division (top tier) after Racing FC defeated Minerva Lintgen.

14 May 2025	Differdange 03 (1)	3–0	Wiltz (1)	Differdange
20:00				Stadium: Stade Municipal de la Ville de Differdange; Referee: Loic Thomas

14 May 2025	Racing FC (1)	2–3	F91 Dudelange (1)	Luxembourg City
20:00				Stadium: Stade Achille Hammerel; Referee: Gilles Becker

== Final ==
The final was held between the two semi-final winners, Differdange 03 and F91 Dudelange, both from Esch-sur-Alzette.

28 May 2025	Differdange 03 (1)	2–2 (a.e.t.) (5–4 p)	F91 Dudelange (1)	Luxembourg City
19:30	Silva 78'; Trani 119' (pen.)	Report	Hadji 12'; D'Anzico 110' (o.g.)	Stadium: Stade de Luxembourg; Referee: Ivo Torres
	Penalties
	Silva (penalty scored); Rychelmy (penalty scored); Varela (penalty scored); Lempereur (penalty scored); Trani (penalty scored)		(penalty scored) Hadji; (penalty missed) Zrankeon; (penalty scored) Kirch; (penalty scored) Schaus; (penalty scored) Gonçalves
