= Nathalie Thill =

Luxembourgish footballer

Personal information
- Date of birth: 16 August 1973 (age 53)
- Place of birth: Luxembourg City, Luxembourg
- Position: Goalkeeper

Senior career*
Years	Team	Apps	(Gls)
- US Esch
–2001	Jeunesse Junglinster		
2001–2002	Progrès Niederkorn		
2002–2013	Minerva Lintgen		

International career
2008–2013	Luxembourg	13	(0)
- * Club domestic league appearances and goals

Nathalie Thill (born 16 August 1973) is a Luxembourgish former footballer who played as a goalkepeer. She also participated professionally in throwing sports.

== Club career ==
She played for US Esch, Jeunesse Junglinster, Progrès Niederkorn during the 2001–02 season, and Minerva Lingten between 2002 and 2013.

She won the 2001–02 Dames Ligue 1 with Progrès Niederkorn.

== International career ==
She made her debut for Luxembourg on 30 September 2008 during a 6–1 friendly loss against Wales. She then represented Luxembourg during UEFA Women's Euro 2013 qualifying and 2015 FIFA Women's World Cup qualification before retiring as the oldest player to represent Luxembourg at the age of 39 years and 326 days during the 2–1 preliminary round loss against Albania on 9 April 2013.

== Throwing sports career ==
She was the Luxembourgish champion in shot put in 1998 and 1999, discus throw in 1999, and javelin throw in 1994, 1995, 1997, 1998, 1999, and 2000.

== Personal life ==
Thill is married to former footballer Serge Thill. Together, they have had three sons that have gone onto represent Luxembourg at international level: Olivier Thill, Sébastien Thill and Vincent Thill.

== Career statistics ==
=== International ===
Appearances and goals by national team and year
National team	Year	Apps	Goals
Luxembourg	2008	3	0
Luxembourg	2009	1	0
Luxembourg	2010	0	0
Luxembourg	2011	4	0
Luxembourg	2012	1	0
Luxembourg	2013	4	0
Total		13	0

== Honours ==
Progrès Niederkorn

- Dames Ligue 1: 2001–02
