= 2022–23 Luxembourg Cup =

Tournament details
- Country: Luxembourg

Final positions
- Champions: Differdange 03
- Runners-up: Marisca Mersch

The 2022–23 Luxembourg Cup, also known as Loterie Nationale Coupe de Luxembourg, for sponsorship reasons, was the 98th year of the football knockout tournament in Luxembourg. The cup began on 7 September 2022. The winner of the cup earned a place in the 2023–24 UEFA Europa Conference League.

Racing FC were the defending champions after winning the Luxembourg Cup final in the previous season over F91 Dudelange by the score of 3–2.

The competition was notable for being one of the few top-tier cup competitions that still used the three substitute rule.

== Preliminary round ==
Seven preliminary round matches were played on 7 September 2022.

Team 1	Score	Team 2
Koerich	4–0	Boevange-Attert
Red Boys Aspelt	1–4	Jeunesse Biwer
Wincrange	3–1	Reisdorf
Olympia Christnach-Waldbillig	0–3	Obercorn
Kopstal 33	2–3	Minière Lasauvage
Claravallis Clervaux	0–6	Rupensia Lusitanos
Ehlerange	4–2	Rambrouch

== First round ==
Thirty-two first round matches were played on 9, 10 and 11 September 2022.

Team 1	Score	Team 2
Stengefort	2–1	Union Mertert
Kischpelt Wilwerwiltz	1–10	Young Boys
Clemency	4–3	Colmarberg
Berdorf Consdorf	1–1 (a.e.t.) (3–5 p)	CeBra 01
Koerich	1–1 (a.e.t.) (2–4 p)	Lorentzweiler
Vinesca Ehnen	3–4	Sporting Mertzig
Kehlen	2–1	Jeunesse Useldange
Pratzerthal-Redange	2–0	Hosingen
Luxembourg-Porto	2–0	Bourscheid
Red Star Merl-Belair	6–2	The Belval Belvaux
Norden	4–3	Union Kayl-Tétange
Bastendorf	3–1	Minerva Lintgen
Les Aiglons Dalheim	1–6	Résidence Walferdange
Orania Vianden	0–5	Koeppchen
Daring Echternach	4–2	Alliance Aischdall
Ehlerange	0–2	Sandweiler
Green Boys	3–0	Obercorn
Les Ardoisiers Perlé	3–2	Rupensia Lusitanos
Schouweiler	0–4	Schengen
Luna Oberkorn	1–3	Avenir Beggen
Minière Lasauvage	0–2	Fola Esch
Biekerech	1–3	Sporting Bertrange
Heiderscheid / Eschdorf	0–6	Blo-Wäiss Izeg
Moutfort / Medingen	1–3	Jeunesse Gilsdorf
Excelsior Grevels	2–8	Red Black / Egalité
Munsbach	3–2	Folschette
Erpeldange	0–2	Feulen
Tricolore Gasperich	0–2	URB
SC Ell	0–6	Syra Mensdorf
Noertzange	0–2	Sanem
Brouch	1–3	Racing Troisvierges
Wincrange	3–3 (a.e.t.) (5–4 p)	Jeunesse Biwer

== Second round ==
Thirty-two second round matches were played on 30 September, 1 and 2 October 2022.

Team 1	Score	Team 2
Lorentzweiler	0–3	Victoria Rosport
Bastendorf	0–4	Racing FC
CeBra 01	4–2	Jeunesse Junglinster
Stengefort	0–8	Monnerich
Daring Echternach	3–2	Atert Bissen
Avenir Beggen	2–0	Jeunesse Canach
Feulen	4–3	Yellow Boys Weiler
URB	1–3	Etzella Ettelbrück
Syra Mensdorf	2–1	Rodange
Sporting Bertrange	1–8	UNA Strassen
Sandweiler	2–2 (a.e.t.) (3–4 p)	Jeunesse Schieren
Red Star Merl-Belair	0–1	Blô-Weiss Medernach
Racing Troisvierges	0–12	Differdange 03
Pratzerthal-Redange	0–5	Berdenia Berbourg
Norden	1–4	Grevenmacher
Sporting Mertzig	0–4	Mondorf-les-Bains
Les Ardoisiers Perlé	1–14	Jeunesse d'Esch
Koeppchen	1–2	Hostert
Kehlen	0–6	Fola Esch
Jeunesse Gilsdorf	0–5	Wiltz
Green Boys	0–9	Swift Hesperange
Schengen	3–2	Schifflange
Red Black / Egalité	1–0	Alisontia Steinsel
Munsbach	1–5	F91 Dudelange
Esch	1–7	Bettembourg
Young Boys	1–4	Luxembourg City
Sanem	1–3	Marisca Mersch
Clemency	1–4	Rumelange
Blo-Wäiss Izeg	0–2	UT Pétange
Wincrange	0–6	Progrès Niederkorn
Luxembourg-Porto	0–5	UN Käerjéng
Résidence Walferdange	1–2	Mamer

== Third round ==
Sixteen third round matches were played on 28, 29 and 30 October 2022.

Team 1	Score	Team 2
Syra Mensdorf	0–2	Marisca Mersch
Mamer	2–5	Hostert
Red Black / Egalité	1–5	Swift Hesperange
Daring Echternach	0–7	Mondorf-les-Bains
Monnerich	0–2	Victoria Rosport
Jeunesse d'Esch	0–1	Wiltz
CeBra 01	1–6	UNA Strassen
Etzella Ettelbrück	2–3	UT Pétange
Bettembourg	1–4	F91 Dudelange
Feulen	1–2	Berdenia Berbourg
Grevenmacher	0–2	Differdange 03
Schengen	1–3	Fola Esch
Blô-Weiss Medernach	1–4	Luxembourg City
Avenir Beggen	0–3	Racing FC
Rumelange	3–1	Jeunesse Schieren
Progrès Niederkorn	1–0	UN Käerjéng

== Fourth round ==
Eight fourth round matches were played on 12 April 2023.

12 April 2023	Differdange 03	1–0	Swift Hesperange	Stade Municipal de la Ville de Differdange
20:00 (UTC+2)

12 April 2023	US Rumelange	1–3 (a.e.t.)	Progrès Niederkorn	Stade Municipal
20:00 (UTC+2)

12 April 2023	Victoria Rosport	2–0	Fola Esch	Party-Rent-Arena
20:00 (UTC+2)

12 April 2023	Union Titus Pétange	2–3	F91 Dudelange	Stade Municipal
20:00 (UTC+2)

12 April 2023	Wiltz	4–1	Hostert	Stade Am Pëtz
20:00 (UTC+2)

12 April 2023	Luxembourg City	0–6	Marisca Mersch	Stade du Cents
20:00 (UTC+2)

12 April 2023	US Mondorf-les-Bains	2–1	UNA Strassen	Stade John Grün
20:00 (UTC+2)

12 April 2023	Berdenia Berbourg	0–4	Racing FC	Stade Rénert
20:00 (UTC+2)

== Quarter-final ==
Four quarter-final matches were played on 26 April 2023.

26 April 2023	US Mondorf-les-Bains	1-0	Racing FC	Stade John Grün
20:00 (UTC+2)

26 April 2023	F91 Dudelange	2-3 (a.e.t.)	Victoria Rosport	Stade Jos Nosbaum
20:00 (UTC+2)

26 April 2023	Differdange 03	3-2	Progrès Niederkorn	Stade Municipal de la Ville de Differdange
20:00 (UTC+2)

26 April 2023	Marisca Mersch	3-1	Wiltz	Stade Schintgespesch
20:00 (UTC+2)

== Semi-final ==
Two semi-final matches were played on 10 May 2023.

10 May 2023	Marisca Mersch	2-1	US Mondorf-les-Bains	Stade Schintgespesch
20:00 (UTC+2)

10 May 2023	Differdange 03	1-0	Victoria Rosport	Stade Municipal de la Ville de Differdange
20:00 (UTC+2)

== Final ==
26 May 2023
20:00 (UTC+02:00)

Differdange 03	4-2	Marisca Mersch
Castro 31'; Ulisses 42'; Naïfi 71'; Pomponi 90+1'	Report	Rodrigues da Cruz 65'; Thill 82'

Stade de Luxembourg
Attendance: 8,385
Referee: Ricardo Morais

GK	37	(Republic of the Congo) Christoffer Mafoumbi
RCB	4	(Luxembourg) Kevin D'Anzico
CB	14	(Argentina) Juan Bedouret
LCB	5	(France) Théo Brusco
RM	25	(France) Geoffrey Franzoni	(yellow card) 63' (c)
RCM	6	(Guinea-Bissau) Manuel Pami Costa	(yellow card) 77'
LCM	88	(Brazil) Ulisses	(yellow card) 79'
LM	21	(France) Dylan Lempereur
AM	8	(France) Guillaume Trani		(substituted off) 81'
RF	11	(France) Amine Naïfi		(substituted off) 90'
LF	9	(Republic of the Congo) Érico Castro		(substituted off) 74'
Substitutes:
GK	16	(Luxembourg) Rémy Pereira
DF	77	(Luxembourg) Gianluca Bei	(yellow card) 90+6'	(substituted on) 81'
MF	2	(Luxembourg) Gianni Medina		(substituted on) 74'
MF	23	(France) Kilian Gulluni
FW	24	(France) Laurent Pomponi		(substituted on) 90'
Manager:
(Portugal) Hélder Dias

GK	30	(Cameroon) Stéphan Moussima
RB	13	(Luxembourg) Patrick Neves Esteves
RCB	45	(Luxembourg) Danilo Marcelino		(substituted off) 76'
LCB	96	(Luxembourg) Valter Barros Andrade		(substituted off) 67'
LB	14	(Luxembourg) Ernest Agovic	(yellow card) 59'	(substituted off) 81'
CM	18	(Luxembourg) David Dadashev
RCM	43	(Luxembourg) Tun Held
LCM	19	(Luxembourg) Nicola Schreiner
RW	75	(Portugal) Alison Martins
LW	77	(Luxembourg) Joel Rodrigues da Cruz
CF	11	(Luxembourg) Benjamin Bresch (c)
Substitutes:
GK	33	(Germany) Arian Schmitt
DF	5	(France) Valentin Duarte		(substituted on) 67'
DF	12	(France) Tidiane Sacko		(substituted on) 76'
MF	7	(Luxembourg) Frédéric Thill		(substituted on) 81'
MF	25	(Luxembourg) Rayan Natami
Manager:
(Luxembourg) Mikhail Zaritski

Assistant referees:
Joaquim Da Silva
Yannick Mentz
Fourth official:
Cédric Biever

Match rules

- 90 minutes.
- 30 minutes of extra-time if necessary.
- Penalty shoot-out if scores still level.
- Five named substitutes.
- Maximum of three substitutions, with an additional substitution allowed in extra time.

== Streaming ==
There was partial live coverage of the cup for the third round, with full live coverage from the fourth round onwards, on RTL.
