= Jonathan Joubert =

Footballer (born 1979)

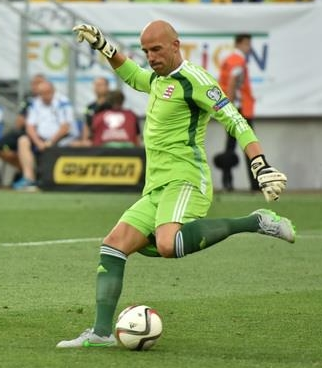

Personal information
- Date of birth: 12 September 1979 (age 47)
- Place of birth: Metz, France
- Height: 1.90 m (6 ft 3 in)
- Position: Goalkeeper

Team information
- Current team: F91 Dudelange (gk coach)

Senior career*
Years	Team	Apps	(Gls)
1997–1999	Metz II	12	(0)
1999–2004	CS Grevenmacher	131	(0)
2004–2020	F91 Dudelange	368	(0)
2020–2021	Swift Hesperange	30	(0)
2021–2023	F91 Dudelange	10	(0)
Total		551	(0)

International career
2006–2017	Luxembourg	90	(0)

Managerial career
- 2023–2024: F91 Dudelange (gk coach)
- 2024: F91 Dudelange (assistant)
- 2024–: F91 Dudelange (gk coach)
- * Club domestic league appearances and goals

Jonathan Joubert (born 12 September 1979) is a former professional footballer who played goalkeeper. Born in France, he played for the Luxembourg national team.

== Club career ==
The French-born Joubert started his career at the reserves of local side Metz before joining CS Grevenmacher for the 1999–2000 season. With them, he won the club's first domestic league and cup title in 2003, subsequently achieving the double.

In 2004, he left Grevenmacher for Dudelange, where he ended up winning eleven league and five cup titles.

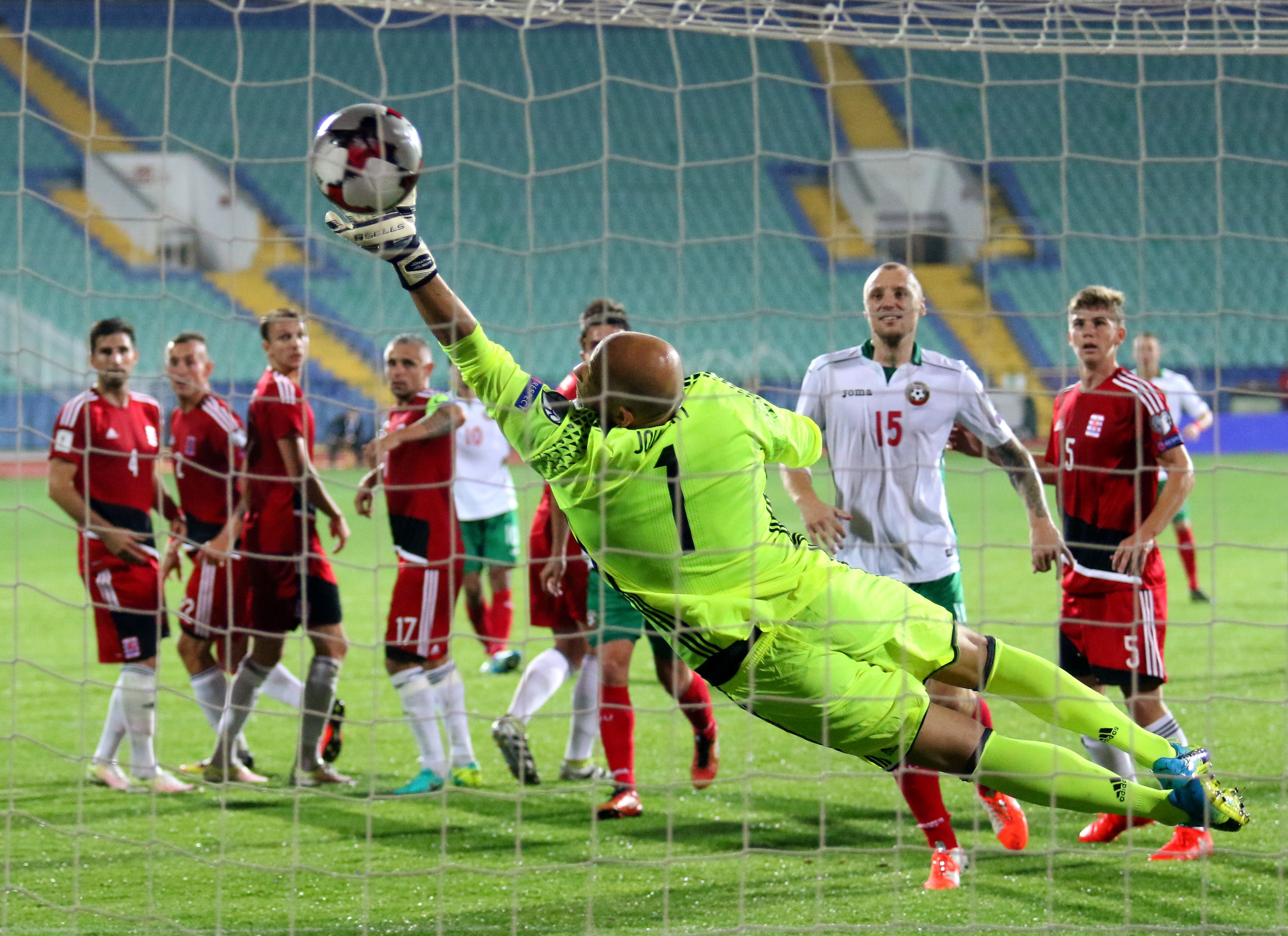

== International career ==
Joubert made his debut for Luxembourg in a June 2006 friendly match against Portugal and by October 2017 had earned 90 caps, scoring no goals.

On 3 September 2017, Luxembourg held Joubert's native France to a 0–0 draw, with Joubert himself pulling off a string of saves to keep a clean sheet. Joubert's performance was later praised by French manager Didier Deschamps.

== Coaching career ==
After retiring at the end of the 2022–23 season, Joubert was appointed goalkeeper coach at F91 Dudelange under manager Jamath Shoffner. In January 2024, Joubert was instead appointed as assistant coach, as the previous assistant, Claudio Lombardelli, had just been announced as the club's new manager.

Ahead of the 2024–25 season, Joubert became assistant coach again, following the appointment of manager Marco Martino.

== Honours ==
- Luxembourg National Division: 12

2003, 2005, 2006, 2007, 2008, 2009, 2011, 2012, 2014, 2016, 2017,2018

- Luxembourg Cup: 6

2003, 2006, 2007, 2009, 2012, 2017
