= Lombardelli =

Lombardelli is a surname. Notable people with the surname include:

- Clare Lombardelli, British economist
- Claudio Lombardelli (born 1987), Luxembourgian football player
