= Ralph Schon =

Luxembourgish footballer

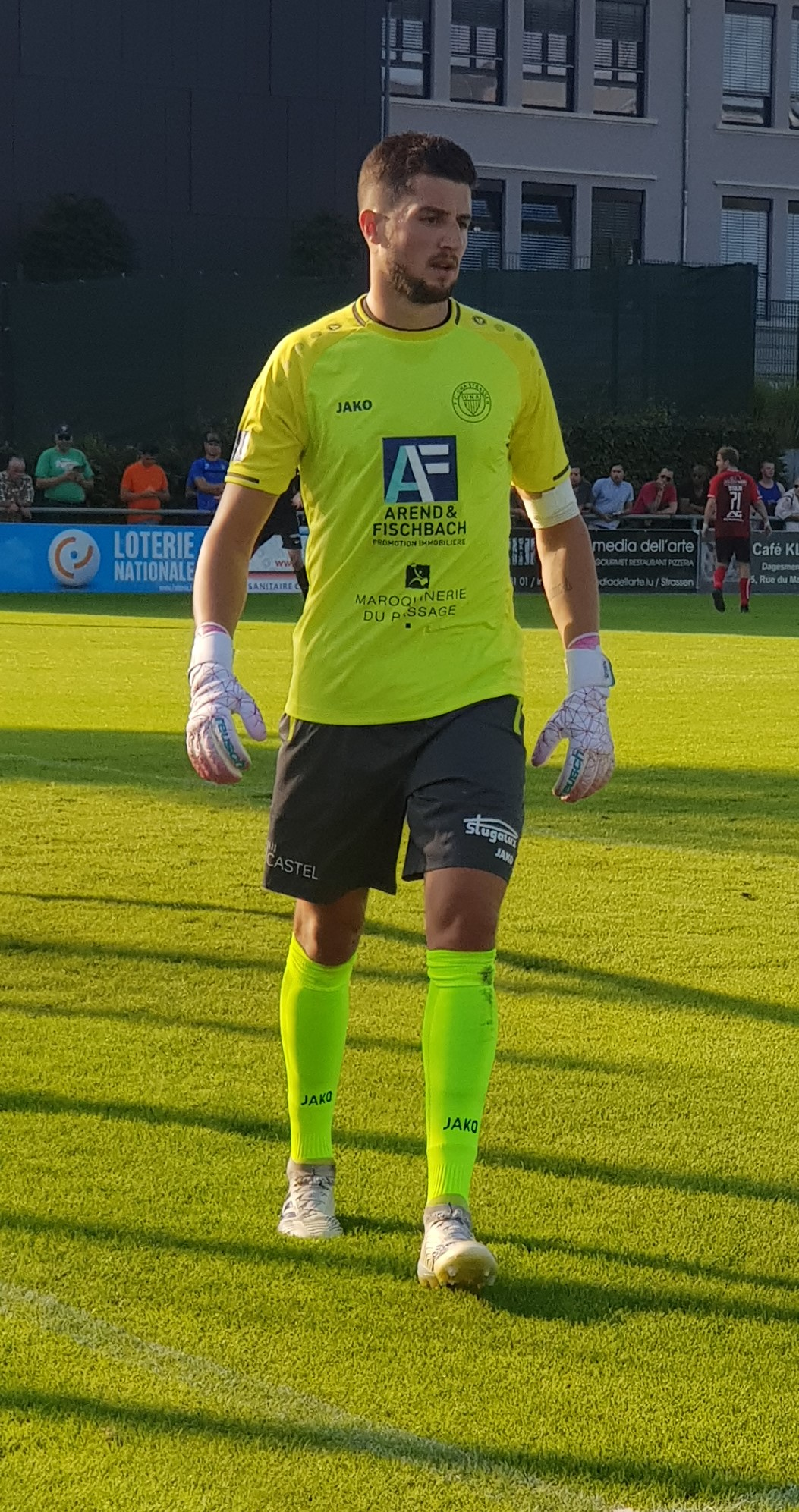

Personal information
- Full name: Ralph Schon
- Date of birth: 20 January 1990 (age 36)
- Place of birth: Luxembourg
- Height: 1.95 m (6 ft 5 in)
- Position: Goalkeeper

Team information
- Current team: FC AS Hosingen
- Number: 21

Youth career
- –2006: FF Norden 02

Senior career*
Years	Team	Apps	(Gls)
2006–2016	FF Norden 02	70	(0)
2016–2020	FC UNA Strassen	88	(0)
2020–2025	FC Wiltz 71	132	(0)
2025–	FC AS Hosingen	0	(0)

International career^{‡}
2016–2024	Luxembourg	19	(0)
- * Club domestic league appearances and goals as of 31 May 2025 ‡ National team caps and goals as of 18 November 2024

Ralph Schon (born 20 January 1990) is a Luxembourgish international footballer who plays club football for FC AS Hosingen, as a goalkeeper.

== Career ==
Schon has also played club football for FF Norden 02 and FC UNA Strassen.

He made his international debut for Luxembourg in 2016 in a 3:1 away loss to the Netherlands in a 2018 FIFA World Cup qualification match.

Schon's final appearance for Luxembourg came as a substitute in a 2-2 UEFA Nations League draw against Northern Ireland on 18 November 2024.
