= Camille Neumann =

Luxembourgish footballer

Personal information
- Date of birth: 28 September 1956 (age 70)
- Position: Midfielder

Senior career*
Years	Team	Apps	(Gls)
1974–1983	Progrès Niederkorn		

International career
1978–1980	Luxembourg	6	(0)
- * Club domestic league appearances and goals

Camille Neumann (born 28 September 1956) is a retired Luxembourgish football midfielder.
