= Davis Spruds =

Latvian footballer (born 1998)

Personal information
- Full name: Davis Davids Spruds
- Date of birth: 28 December 1998 (age 27)
- Place of birth: Liepaja, Latvia
- Height: 1.90 m (6 ft 3 in)
- Position: Centre-back

Team information
- Current team: Rosport
- Number: 15

Youth career
- TuS Mayen
- 2013–2014: Euskirchener TSC
- 2014–2016: TSV Hertha Walheim
- 2016–2017: TuS Koblenz

Senior career*
Years	Team	Apps	(Gls)
2017–2019	FC Bitburg	56	(13)
2019–2023	Rosport	85	(11)
2023	Swift	3	(1)
2024–	Rosport	10	(0)

International career
2014	Latvia U17	1	(0)
2019–2020	Latvia U19	4	(0)
- * Club domestic league appearances and goals

Davis Davids Spruds (Latvian: Dāvis Dāvids Sprūds; born 28 December 1998) is a footballer who plays as a centre-back for Rosport. Born in Germany he has been called up to represent Latvia internationally.

== Early life ==
Spruds was born in 1998 in Latvia. He started playing football at the age of four.

== Club career ==
In 2023, Spruds signed for Luxembourgish side Swift. He played in the UEFA Conference League while playing for the club. In 2024, he returned to Luxembourgish side Rosport.

== International career ==
Born in Germany, Spruds is of Latvian descent. He has been called up to represent Latvia internationally. He was first called up to the Latvia national football team in 2023.

== Style of play ==
Spruds mainly operates as a defender. He is known for his goalscoring ability.

== Personal life ==
Spruds is the son of an engineer father. He has two younger brothers.
