= Souleymane Cissé (footballer, born 2002) =

French footballer (born 2002)

Personal information
- Date of birth: 8 August 2002 (age 24)
- Place of birth: Soisy-sous-Montmorency, France
- Height: 1.90 m (6 ft 3 in)
- Position: Centre-back

Team information
- Current team: Progrès Niederkorn
- Number: 13

Youth career
- 2015–2020: Lens

Senior career*
| Years | Team | Apps | (Gls) |
| 2020–2022 | Lens II | 23 | (2) |
| 2022–2023 | Clermont II | 5 | (0) |
| 2022–2023 | Clermont | 2 | (0) |
| 2023–2025 | Dijon | 19 | (0) |
| 2023–2025 | Dijon B | 5 | (0) |
| 2025– | Progrès Niederkorn | 6 | (0) |
- * Club domestic league appearances and goals as of 13 June 2026

Souleymane Cissé (born 8 August 2002) is a French professional footballer who plays as a centre-back for Luxembourgian club Progrès Niederkorn.

== Professional career ==
A youth product of Lens, Cissé began his senior career with their reserves in 2020. He transferred to Clermont on 22 June 2022, signing a 1+2 years professional contract. On 20 January 2021, he made his senior and professional debut with the senior Clermont side as a late substitute in a 1–0 Ligue 1 loss to Marseille on 31 August 2022.

== Personal life ==
Born in France, Cissé is of Senegalese descent.
