= Manuel Pami =

Bissau-Guinean footballer

Personal information
- Full name: Manuel Pami Costa
- Date of birth: 5 February 1999 (age 27)
- Place of birth: Bissau, Guinea-Bissau
- Height: 1.80 m (5 ft 11 in)
- Position: Midfielder

Team information
- Current team: União de Santarém
- Number: 6

Youth career
- 2007–2008: EAS Póvoa de Santa Iria
- 2008–2009: Povoense
- 2009–2016: Sporting CP
- 2016–2017: Vitória Guimarães

Senior career*
Years	Team	Apps	(Gls)
2017–2018	Chaves II	26	(2)
2018–2019	Ideal	28	(0)
2019–2020	Canelas 2010	30	(1)
2020–2022	Varzim	0	(0)
2020–2022	→ Canelas 2010 (loan)	27	(0)
2022–2024	Differdange 03	45	(1)
2025	Lahti	20	(3)
2026	Rustavi	12	(0)
2026–	União de Santarém	4	(0)

International career^{‡}
2022–	Guinea-Bissau	1	(0)
- * Club domestic league appearances and goals as of 12 September 2026 ‡ National team caps and goals as of 07:04, 12 March 2023 (UTC)

Manuel Pami Costa (born 5 February 1999) is a Bissau-Guinean professional footballer who plays as a midfielder for Portuguese Liga 3 club União de Santarém and the Guinea-Bissau national team.

== Youth career ==
Pami is a youth product of EAS Póvoa de Santa Iria, Povoense, Sporting CP and Vitória Guimarães.

== Club career ==
He began his senior career with the reserves of Chaves in 2017.

The following season, he had a one-year stint with Ideal before moving to Canelas 2010 in 2019.

On 12 June 2020, he transferred to Varzim. He returned to Canelas 2010 on loan for 2 seasons starting on 21 December 2020.

In June 2022, he transferred to the Luxembourgish club Differdange 03.

In January 2025, he joined FC Lahti in Finnish second-tier Ykkösliiga.

== International career ==
Pami made his international debut with the Guinea-Bissau national team in a friendly 1–1 tie with Martinique on 24 September 2022.

== Career statistics ==
=== Club ===
As of 23 June 2026

Appearances and goals by club, season and competition
Club	Season	League			Cup (Note: Includes Taça de Portugal, Luxembourg Cup and Suomen Cup)		League cup (Note: Includes Ykkösliigacup)		Europe		Total	
Club	Season	Division	Apps	Goals	Apps	Goals	Apps	Goals	Apps	Goals	Apps	Goals
Chaves B	2017–18	Vila Real FA Division of Honour	26	2	–		–		–		26	2
Ideal	2018–19	Campeonato de Portugal	28	0	2	0	–		–		30	0
Canelas 2010	2019–20	Campeonato de Portugal	24	1	5	0	–		–		24	1
Varzim	2020–21	Liga Portugal 2	0	0	0	0	0	0	–		0	0
Canelas 2010 (loan)	2020–21	Campeonato de Portugal	9	0	0	0	–		–		9	0
Canelas 2010 (loan)	2021–22	Liga 3	17	0	1	0	0	0	–		18	0
Canelas 2010 (loan)	Total		26	0	1	0	0	0	0	0	27	0
Differdange 03	2022–23	Luxembourg National Division	19	0	4	1	–		2 (Note: Appearances in UEFA Conference League)	0	25	1
Differdange 03	2023–24	Luxembourg National Division	26	1	2	0	–		2	0	30	1
Differdange 03	Total		45	1	6	1	0	0	4	0	55	2
Lahti	2025	Ykkösliiga	20	3	0	0	4	0	–		24	3
Rustavi	2026	Erovnuli Liga	12	0	–		–		–		12	0
Career total			181	7	14	1	4	0	4	0	203	8

=== International ===
As of 24 September 2022

Guinea-Bissau
Year	Apps	Goals
2022	1	0
Total	1	0

== Honours ==
Differdange 03

- Luxembourg National Division: 2023–24
- Luxembourg Cup: 2022–23
