= Aldin Skenderović =

Luxembourgish international footballer (born 1997)

Personal information
- Date of birth: 28 June 1997 (age 29)
- Place of birth: Luxembourg City, Luxembourg
- Height: 1.85 m (6 ft 1 in)
- Position: Defender

Team information
- Current team: Rodange
- Number: 44

Senior career*
| Years | Team | Apps | (Gls) |
| 2014–2016 | FC Differdange 03 | 1 | (0) |
| 2016–2018 | Union Titus Pétange | 61 | (0) |
| 2018–2019 | SV Elversberg | 19 | (0) |
| 2019–2022 | Progrès Niederkorn | 72 | (1) |
| 2022–2023 | F91 Dudelange | 25 | (1) |
| 2023–2025 | Swift Hesperange | 21 | (0) |
| 2025– | Rodange | 27 | (0) |

International career^{‡}
| 2014–2015 | Luxembourg U-19 | 5 | (0) |
| 2015– | Luxembourg U-21 | 8 | (0) |
| 2017– | Luxembourg | 27 | (0) |
- * Club domestic league appearances and goals as of 6 June 2026 ‡ National team caps and goals as of 24 September 2022

Aldin Skenderović (Montenegrin: Алдин Скендеровић, pronounced [skenděːroʋitɕ]; born 28 June 1997) is a Luxembourgish international footballer who plays club football for Rodange as a defender.

== Career ==
Skenderović has played club football for FC Differdange 03, Union Titus Pétange and Progrès Niederkorn.

He made his international debut for Luxembourg in 2017.

== Personal life ==
Skenderović is a Bosniak of Montenegrin descent.
