= Mustapha Hadji =

Moroccan footballer (born 1971)

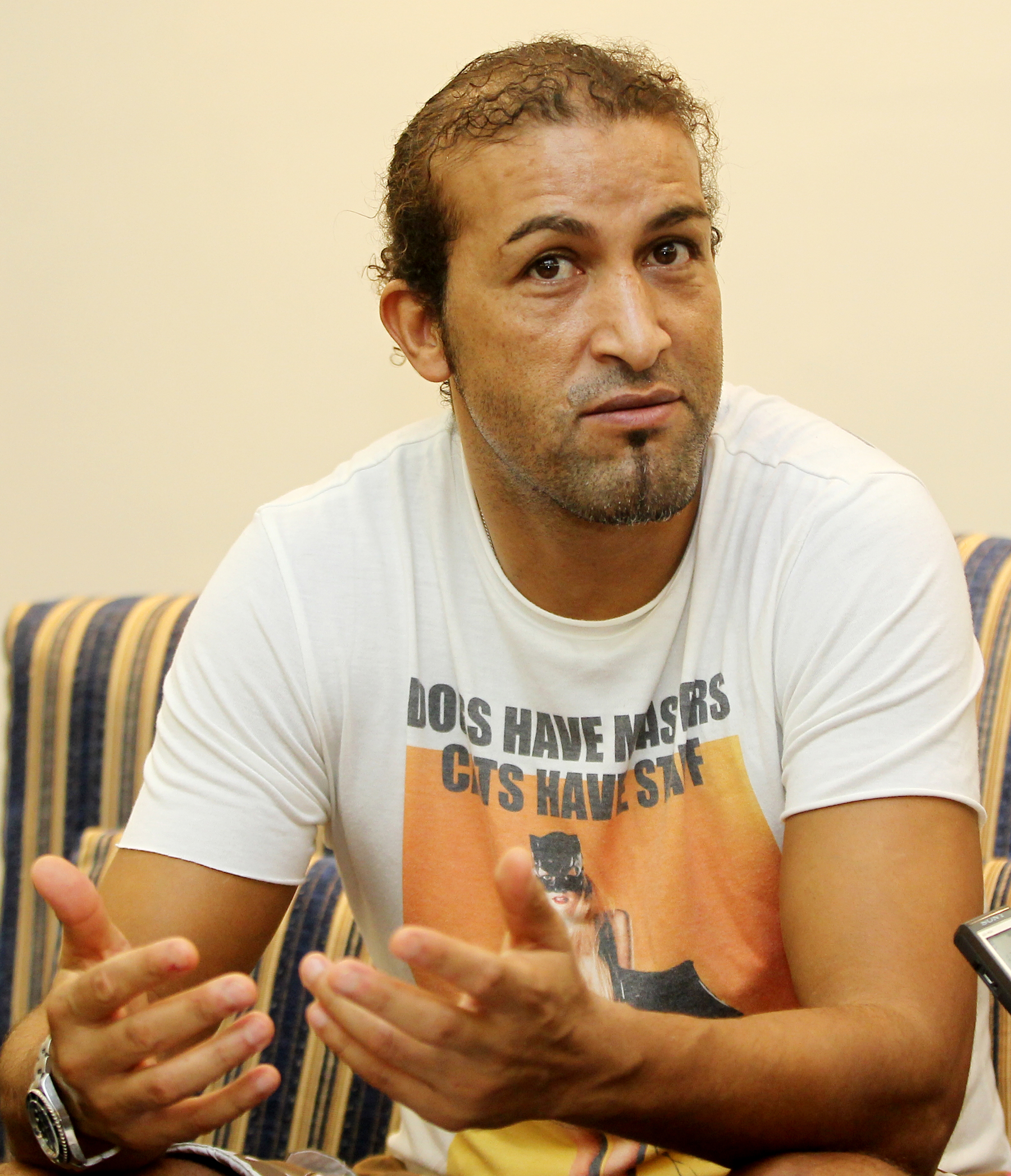
- Hadji in 2012

Personal information
- Date of birth: 16 November 1971 (age 54)
- Place of birth: Ifrane Atlas-Saghir, Morocco
- Position: Midfielder

Senior career*
Years	Team	Apps	(Gls)
1991–1996	Nancy	134	(31)
1996–1997	Sporting CP	27	(3)
1997–1999	Deportivo la Coruña	31	(2)
1999–2001	Coventry City	62	(12)
2001–2004	Aston Villa	35	(2)
2004	Espanyol	16	(1)
2004–2005	Emirates Club	15	(5)
2005–2007	Saarbrücken	54	(10)
2007–2010	Fola Esch	44	(25)
Total		418	(91)

International career
1993–2002	Morocco	63	(12)

Managerial career
- 2012–2013: Umm Salal (assistant)
- 2014–2022: Morocco (assistant)
- * Club domestic league appearances and goals

Mustapha Hadji (Arabic: مصطفى حجي, Berber languages: ⵎⵙⵟⴰⴼⴰ ⵃⴰⵊⵊⵉ; born 16 November 1971) is a Moroccan football coach and former player. He was named the 50th greatest African player of all time by the African football expert Ed Dove.

== Early life ==
Hadji was born in Ifrane Atlas-Saghir, Morocco. He emigrated with his family to France at the age of ten. He holds Moroccan and French nationalities.

== Club career ==
Hadji began playing in France. He signed his first contract with Nancy, where he spent his first season as a youth player before joining the senior squad in his second year with the club.

After playing five seasons for Nancy, Hadji joined Sporting Lisbon and then Deportivo la Coruña, but it was with Coventry City where he became well known, especially in Britain, after he was signed by Gordon Strachan in 1999.

Hadji was a goal-scoring attacking midfielder with great pace and skill. At Coventry, he was joined by Moroccan international, Youssef Chippo, sparking a brief trend for City fans to wear fezzes to games in their honour. After Coventry were relegated in 2001, he joined local rivals Aston Villa, having scored against them three times in the previous season. But after only playing sporadically, scoring in the league against Southampton and Everton and once in the UEFA Cup against NK Varteks, he was released on a free transfer to Espanyol in Spain where he remained until June 2004.

Hadji later played for Al Ain in the United Arab Emirates, where he remained for one year before returning to Europe. In 2005, he signed a two-year contract with Saarbrücken in the 2. Bundesliga. At the request of the coach Horst Ehrmantraut, Hadji made a midfield pairing with another Moroccan international, Faysal El Idrissi. On 4 August 2005, Hadji made his début for Saarbrücken, on the first day of the 2. Bundesliga season, against Bochum, losing the match 4–0. After another defeat, Ehrmantraut was sacked. Rudi Bommer took over as coach and Saarbrücken lost 2–1 after extra time in the second round of the DFB-Pokal against Unterhaching. Hadji scored to give his team the lead, but was sent off in the 85th minute and was suspended for three cup matches by the German Football Association.

In August 2007, Hadji signed for Fola Esch, in the Luxembourg's top-tier National Division. He ended his playing career in July 2010.

== International career ==
At the 1994 FIFA World Cup, Hadji played in all three group games for Morocco, two as substitute. In Morocco's third game against the Netherlands, Hadji set up the equalizer for Hassan Nader with his first touch after coming on as substitute. Despite this, Morocco lost all three games and were eliminated. Hadji scored a great goal in Morocco's 2–2 draw with Norway in the 1998 FIFA World Cup but Morocco again failed to qualify for the knock-out stages. He was named African Footballer of the Year after the World Cup in France.

He played in 13 FIFA World Cup qualification matches.

== Other projects ==
Hadji was selected as an ambassador for the 2010 World Cup by FIFA to represent Africa. He is also involved in a partnership with plans to invest in Morocco, thus providing opportunities for the local people, to help rid poverty from his homeland.

Hadji is also a supporter of the charity Show Racism The Red Card.

He would have been ambassador for the 2026 FIFA World Cup, representing his country if Morocco had been selected as the host.

== Coaching career ==
=== Umm Salal ===
He was appointed as an assistant manager at Qatari club Umm Salal by the manager Bertrand Marchand in the 2012–13 Qatar Stars League. The whole staff was sacked after the team finished fifth and failed to qualify for the 2014 AFC Champions League.

=== Morocco ===
He was appointed as an assistant manager for the Morocco national team by manager Badou Ezzaki before the 2015 Africa Cup of Nations. He left the role in 2022, and later that year was suspended by the Confederation of African Football for falsifying his coaching licence.

== Personal life ==
His younger brother Youssouf Hadji was also a Moroccan international and last played for Nancy in France.

Hadji's sons Samir Hadji and Zachary Hadji play for Differdange 03 and UNA Strassen respectively, both in the Luxembourg National Division.

== Career statistics ==
Scores and results list Morocco's goal tally first, score column indicates score after each Morocco goal.

List of international goals scored by Mustapha Hadji
No.	Date	Venue	Opponent	Score	Result	Competition
1	15 November 1995	Rabat, Morocco	Mali	1–0	2–0	Friendly
2	29 August 1996	Settat, Morocco	Zaire	3–0	7–0	Friendly
3	12 January 1997	Kumasi, Ghana	Ghana	2–1	2–2	1998 FIFA World Cup qualification
4	14 January 1998	Casablanca, Morocco	Angola	2–1	2–1	Friendly
5	17 February 1998	Ouagadougou, Burkino Faso	Egypt	1–0	1–0	1998 African Cup of Nations
6	4 June 1998	Avignon, France	Chile	1–0	1–1	Friendly
7	10 June 1998	Montpellier, France	Norway	1–0	2–2	1998 FIFA World Cup
8	24 January 1999	Kamsar, Guinea	Guinea	1–0	1–1	2000 African Cup of Nations qualification
9	28 February 1999	Lomé, Togo	Togo	2–1	3–2	2000 African Cup of Nations qualification
10	17 November 1999	Marrakesh, Morocco	United States	2–1	2–1	Friendly
11	18 January 2000	El Jadida, Morocco	Trinidad and Tobago	1–0	1–0	Friendly
12	30 June 2001	Rabat, Morocco	Egypt	1–0	1–0	2002 FIFA World Cup qualification

== Honours ==
Sporting CP

- Supertaça Cândido de Oliveira: 1995

Aston Villa

- UEFA Intertoto Cup: 2001.

Individual

- African Footballer of the Year : 1998
- CAF Legends award: 2011
- IFFHS All-time Morocco Men's Dream Team
