= Olivier Thill =

Luxembourgish professional footballer (born 1998)

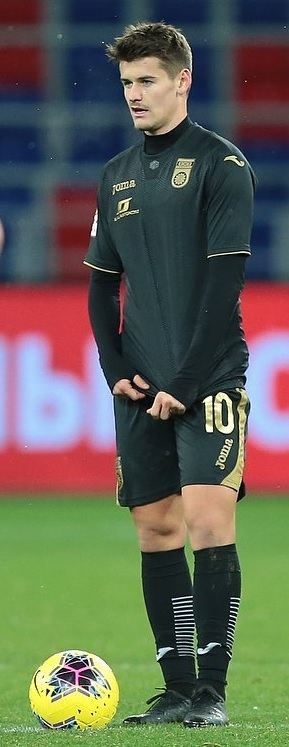
- Thill with Ufa in 2019

Personal information
- Date of birth: 17 December 1996 (age 29)
- Place of birth: Luxembourg City, Luxembourg
- Height: 1.76 m (5 ft 9 in)
- Position: Midfielder

Team information
- Current team: Käerjéng 97

Senior career*
Years	Team	Apps	(Gls)
2015–2018	Progrès Niederkorn	67	(16)
2018–2020	Ufa	50	(1)
2021–2022	Vorskla Poltava	29	(10)
2022	→ Eyüpspor (loan)	8	(1)
2022–2024	Eyüpspor	14	(0)
2023–2024	→ Şanlıurfaspor (loan)	17	(2)
2024–2025	LNZ Cherkasy	32	(2)
2025	Progrès Niederkorn	4	(2)
2025	IMT	13	(2)
2026–	Käerjéng 97	1	(0)

International career^{‡}
2016–2018	Luxembourg U21	7	(0)
2017–	Luxembourg	48	(3)
- * Club domestic league appearances and goals as of 4 August 2026 ‡ National team caps and goals as of 17 November 2025

Olivier Thill (born 17 December 1996) is a Luxembourgish professional footballer who plays as a midfielder for BGL Ligue club Käerjéng 97.

== Club career ==
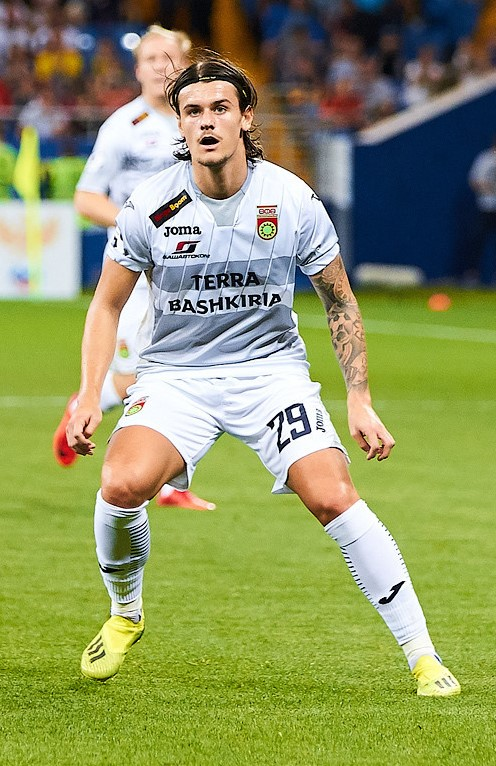

As a senior player, Thill started playing club football for FC Progrès Niederkorn from 2015 to 2018.

On 31 August 2018, he signed a four-year contract with the Russian Premier League club FC Ufa. Three weeks before that, he scored a goal for his previous club Progrès against FC Ufa in the Europa League qualifier. On 17 October 2020, his contract with Ufa was terminated by mutual consent.

On 30 December 2020, Ukrainian Premier League side Vorskla Poltava announced that they had signed a 2-year deal with Thill.

On 7 March 2022, FIFA announced that, due to the Russian invasion of Ukraine, all the contracts of foreign players in Ukraine are suspended until 30 June 2022 and they are allowed to sign with clubs outside Ukraine until that date. On 30 March 2022, Thill signed with Turkish club Eyüpspor until 30 June 2022 using the new rule.

On 18 February 2024, Thill returned to Ukraine and signed with LNZ Cherkasy.

Thill returned to Progrès Niederkorn in summer of 2025 on a three-year deal.

After a stint in the Serbian SuperLiga with IMT in the latter half of 2025, Thill inked a two-year deal with Käerjéng 97 in Luxembourg for the 2026-2027 campaign.

== International career ==
Thill made his international debut for the Luxembourg national team on 31 August 2017 in a 1–0 win over Belarus.

== Personal life ==
Olivier is the brother of Sébastien Thill and Vincent Thill. Sébastien plays for Differdange, while Vincent is on the books at Waldhof Mannheim. The three are the sons of former international footballer Serge Thill.

== Career statistics ==
=== International ===
Scores and results list Luxembourg's goal tally first, score column indicates score after each Thill goal.

List of international goals scored by Olivier Thill
No.	Date	Venue	Opponent	Score	Result	Competition
1	10 October 2017	Stade Josy Barthel, Luxembourg City, Luxembourg	Bulgaria	1–0	1–1	2018 FIFA World Cup qualification
2	8 September 2018	Stade Josy Barthel, Luxembourg City, Luxembourg	Moldova	2–0	4–0	2018–19 UEFA Nations League D
3	4 September 2021	Rajko Mitić Stadium, Belgrade, Serbia	Serbia	1–2	1–4	2022 FIFA World Cup qualification
