= Jordy Soladio =

Belgian footballer (born 1998)

Personal information
- Full name: Jordy Solly Soladio Kandolo
- Date of birth: 12 February 1998 (age 28)
- Height: 1.85 m (6 ft 1 in)
- Position: Striker

Team information
- Current team: Victoria Rosport

Youth career
- 2016–2018: Mechelen

Senior career*
| Years | Team | Apps | (Gls) |
| 2017–2018 | Mechelen | 0 | (0) |
| 2018–2019 | Dessel Sport | 22 | (9) |
| 2019–2020 | Pétange | 10 | (4) |
| 2020–2022 | Victoria Rosport | 34 | (26) |
| 2022 | Liepāja | 12 | (4) |
| 2023 | Song Lam Nghe An | 14 | (5) |
| 2023–2025 | Dender | 36 | (4) |
| 2025 | Maccabi Petah Tikva | 9 | (0) |
| 2025–2026 | Francs Borains | 14 | (1) |
| 2026– | Victoria Rosport | 2 | (1) |
- * Club domestic league appearances and goals as of 16 September 2026

Jordy Solly Soladio Kandolo (born 12 February 1998) is a Belgian professional footballer who plays as a striker for Luxembourg National Division club Victoria Rosport.

== Career ==
Soladio started his career with Belgian top flight side Mechelen. In 2018, he signed for Dessel Sport in the Belgian third tier. In 2020, Soladio signed for Luxembourgish club Victoria Rosport.

In 2022, he signed for Liepāja in Latvia.

Before the 2023 season, Soladio signed for Song Lam Nghe An FC. On 3 February, he made his club debut in a 1–1 draw with SHB Da Nang.

On 30 August 2023, Soladio joined Dender in the Challenger Pro League.
