= Vincent Peugnet =

French footballer (born 1998)

Personal information
- Date of birth: 5 February 1998 (age 28)
- Place of birth: Metz, France
- Height: 1.84 m (6 ft 0 in)
- Position: Centre-back

Team information
- Current team: Progrès Niederkorn
- Number: 27

Youth career
- Metz

Senior career*
Years	Team	Apps	(Gls)
2016–2021	Metz II	48	(2)
2018	Metz	0	(0)
2020	→ Jeunesse Esch (loan)	4	(1)
2021–2022	Cholet	7	(0)
2022–	Progrès Niederkorn	97	(10)
- * Club domestic league appearances and goals as of 13 June 2026

Vincent Peugnet (born 5 February 1998) is a French professional footballer who plays as a centre-back for Progrès Niederkorn in Luxembourg.

== Professional career ==
Peugnet made his professional debut for FC Metz in a 0–0 (2–1) penalty shootout Coupe de France win over Tours FC on 24 January 2018. On 30 May 2018, Peugnet signed his first professional contract with Metz for 3 years.

On 31 May 2021, he agreed to join Championnat National side Cholet.

On 28 January 2022, he returned to Luxembourg and signed a 1.5-year contract with Progrès Niederkorn.
