= Zachary Hadji =

French footballer (born 1996)

Personal information
- Full name: Zachary Marvin Hadji
- Date of birth: 8 October 1996 (age 30)
- Place of birth: Saint-Avold, France
- Height: 1.83 m (6 ft 0 in)
- Position: Striker

Team information
- Current team: UNA Strassen
- Number: 27

Senior career*
Years	Team	Apps	(Gls)
2014–2016	Metz B	28	(7)
2017	Gavà	10	(2)
2017–2018	SV Röchling Völklingen	14	(2)
2019–2021	Fola	42	(35)
2021–2024	SLO	66	(12)
2024	→ Xamax (loan)	9	(2)
2024–	UNA Strassen	24	(12)
- * Club domestic league appearances and goals as of 26 June 2025

Zachary Martin Hadji (born 8 October 1996) is a French footballer who plays as a striker for Luxembourgian club UNA Strassen.

== Early life ==
Hadji grew up in Creutzwald, France. He is of Moroccan descent.

== Career ==
Hadji started his career with French side Metz B. In 2019, he signed for Luxembourgian side Fola, where he was regarded as one of the club's most important players. He was the top scorer of the 2020–21 Luxembourg National Division with thirty-three goals. In 2021, he signed for Swiss side SLO.

On 14 February 2024, Hadji moved on loan to Xamax.

On 31 August 2024, Hadji returned to Luxembourg and signed with UNA Strassen.

== Style of play ==
Hadji mainly operates as a striker and can operate as a winger. He is known for his technical ability.

== Personal life ==
Hadji is the son of Morocco international Mustapha Hadji and the brother of Moroccan footballer Samir Hadji.
