= Claudio Lombardelli =

Luxembourgish footballer

Personal information
- Full name: Claudio Lombardelli
- Date of birth: 14 October 1987 (age 39)
- Place of birth: Esch-sur-Alzette, Luxembourg
- Height: 1.78 m (5 ft 10 in)
- Position: Right midfielder

Team information
- Current team: F91 Dudelange (assistant)

Youth career
- Schifflange 95

Senior career*
Years	Team	Apps	(Gls)
2003–2004	Schifflange 95		
2004–2010	Jeunesse d'Esch	83	(4)
2010–2011	US Rumelange		
2011–2014	Union 05 Kayl-Tétange	11	(1)
2014–2015	Schifflange 95		

International career
2006–2009	Luxembourg	19	(0)

Managerial career
- –2018: F91 Dudelange (youth coach)
- 2018–2020: FC Noertzange
- 2021–2023: US Mondorf (assistant)
- 2023–2024: F91 Dudelange (assistant)
- 2024: F91 Dudelange
- 2024–: F91 Dudelange (assistant)
- * Club domestic league appearances and goals

Claudio Lombardelli (born 14 October 1987) is a former Luxembourgish football player.

== Club career ==
Lombardelli started his career at FC Schifflange 95 before joining Jeunesse in summer 2004.

== International career ==
He made his debut for Luxembourg in a June 2006 friendly match against Portugal, coming on as a late substitute for René Peters. He earned 19 caps, scoring no goals. He played in 3 FIFA World Cup qualification matches.

== Coaching career ==
After his playing career ended in 2015, Lombardelli started playing pétanque. However, he later started as a youth coach at F91 Dudelange and in the summer of 2018 he became manager of FC Noertzange. Lombardelli decided to step back from the position in November 2020.

Ahead of the 2021–22 season, Lombardelli was appointed assistant manager of Arno Bonvini at US Mondorf. In June 2023, Lombardelli returned to F91 Dudelange, as he was appointed assistant manager of newly hired manager Jamath Shoffner. In January 2024, after Shoffner was fired, Lombardelli was appointed manager of the club.

However, he was replaced by Marco Martino ahead of the 2024–25 season, and was again back at his former position as assistant manager.
