= Serge Thill =

Luxembourgish footballer

Personal information
- Date of birth: 29 January 1969 (age 57)
- Place of birth: Luxembourg
- Height: 1.68 m (5 ft 6 in)
- Positions: Midfielder; forward

Senior career*
Years	Team	Apps	(Gls)
1991–1993	Union Luxembourg		
1993–1997	RSC Athusien		
1997–2003	CS Grevenmacher		

International career
1992–1998	Luxembourg	14	(0)

Managerial career
- 2007: Progrès Niederkorn
- * Club domestic league appearances and goals

Serge Thill (born 29 January 1969) is a Luxembourgish former footballer who played for the Luxembourg national team.

== Club career ==
Thill began his senior career in his native Luxembourg in 1991, playing for Union Luxembourg. In 1993, Thill signed for Belgian club RSC Athusien. In 1997, Thill returned to Luxembourg to sign for CS Grevenmacher. Thill stayed at Grevenmacher for five seasons, winning the Luxembourg National Division in his final season at the club.

== International career ==
Thill played 14 times for the Luxembourg national team between 1992 and 1998, making his debut in a 3–2 defeat against Turkey.

== Personal life ==
Thill is married to former athlete Nathalie Thill. Together, they have had three sons that have gone onto represent Luxembourg at international level: Olivier Thill, Sébastien Thill and Vincent Thill.

== Honours ==
Union Luxembourg

- Luxembourg National Division: 1991–92

CS Grevenmacher

- Luxembourg National Division: 2002–03
- Luxembourg Cup: 1997–98, 2002–03
