= Vincent Thill =

Luxembourgish footballer (born 2000)

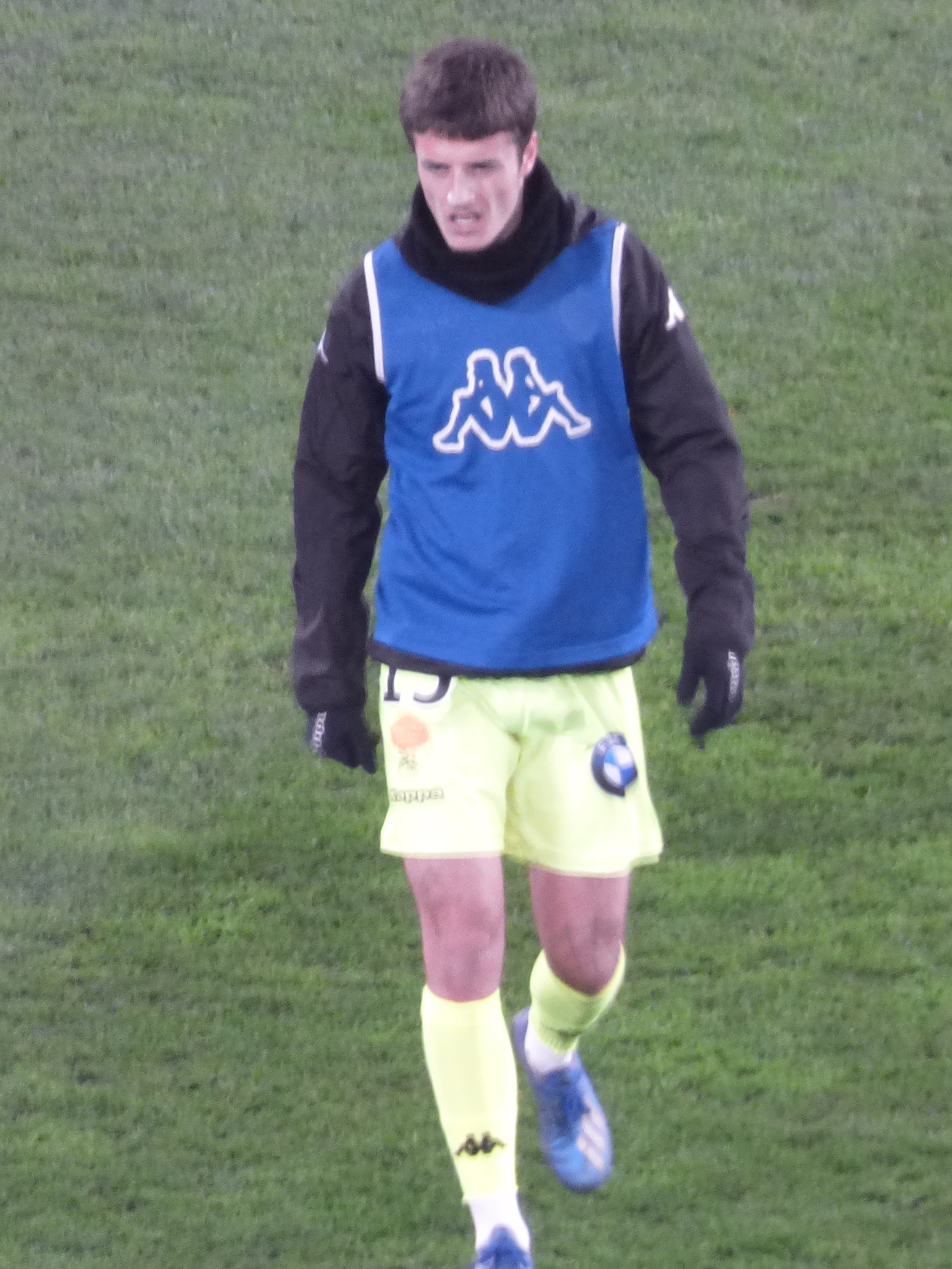
- Thill in 2020

Personal information
- Date of birth: 4 February 2000 (age 26)
- Place of birth: Luxembourg City, Luxembourg
- Height: 1.68 m (5 ft 6 in)
- Position: Attacking midfielder

Team information
- Current team: Waldhof Mannheim
- Number: 12

Youth career
- –2012: Fola Esch
- 2012: Progrès Niederkorn
- 2012–2016: Metz

Senior career*
Years	Team	Apps	(Gls)
2016–2018	Metz II	27	(1)
2016–2020	Metz	2	(0)
2018–2019	→ Pau (loan)	28	(12)
2019–2020	→ Orléans (loan)	19	(1)
2019–2020	→ Orléans II (loan)	3	(0)
2020–2021	Nacional	17	(0)
2021–2023	Vorskla Poltava	0	(0)
2022	→ Örebro (loan)	8	(2)
2022–2023	→ AIK (loan)	19	(1)
2023–2025	Sabah	35	(3)
2025	Zira	0	(0)
2026–	Waldhof Mannheim	14	(1)

International career^{‡}
2015	Luxembourg U17	2	(2)
2017	Luxembourg U19	2	(1)
2016–	Luxembourg	67	(6)
- * Club domestic league appearances and goals as of 12:49, 22 May 2026 (UTC) ‡ National team caps and goals as of 16 November 2026

Vincent Thill (born 4 February 2000) is a Luxembourgish professional footballer who plays as a midfielder for German 3. Liga club Waldhof Mannheim. He represents the Luxembourg national team. He is the younger brother of fellow Luxembourg internationals Sébastien Thill and Olivier Thill.

He was included in The Guardian's "Next Generation 2017".

== Club career ==
Thill started his career with Luxembourgish side Fola Esch before transferring to Progrès Niederkorn, where he spent six months.

He joined Metz in 2012, and signed his first professional contract on 26 May 2016, despite interest from Bayern Munich. On 21 September 2016, Thill made his debut for Metz in a 0–3 defeat against Bordeaux, coming on in the 82nd minute. In doing so, Thill became the first player born in the 2000s to appear in Ligue 1 and in any of Europe's top five leagues.

In August 2018, Thill joined Pau on loan for the 2018–19 season. In the following season, he was loaned out to US Orléans.

On 1 April 2022, Thill joined Örebro in Sweden on a three-months loan.

On 5 August 2022, Thill joined Allsvenskan club AIK on a one-year loan.

On 8 July 2023, Azerbaijan Premier League club Sabah announced the signing of Thill on a two-year contract.

After signing with fellow Azerbaijani side Zira FK in the 2025 summer transfer window, Thill was released by mutual consent on 22 October 2025 after failing to make an appearance with the club.

On 15 January 2026, Thill signed with Waldhof Mannheim in German 3. Liga.

== International career ==
Thill became the youngest player to represent the Luxembourg national team when he made his debut on 25 March 2016, in a 3–0 defeat against Bosnia and Herzegovina. Upon scoring a 90th-minute goal against Nigeria in a 3–1 defeat on 31 May 2016, he became his nation's youngest ever goalscorer and the first player born in the new millennium to score an international goal.

== Personal life ==
Vincent is the brother of Sébastien Thill, who plays for Differdange, and of Olivier Thill, who plays for Käerjéng 97. He is also the son of former international footballer Serge Thill.

== Career statistics ==
=== Club ===
As of 30 July 2021

Appearances and goals by club, season and competition
Club	Season	League			National cup		League cup		Europe		Total	
Club	Season	Division	Apps	Goals	Apps	Goals	Apps	Goals	Apps	Goals	Apps	Goals
Metz	2016–17	Ligue 1	1	0	1	0	0	0	—		2	0
Metz	2017–18	Ligue 1	1	0	1	0	2	0	—		4	0
Metz	Total		2	0	2	0	2	0	—		6	0
Pau (loan)	2018–19	Championnat National	28	12	1	0	—		—		29	12
Orléans 2 (loan)	2019–20	Championnat National 3	2	0	0	0	0	0	—		2	0
Orléans (loan)	2019–20	Ligue 2	19	1	1	0	1	0	—		21	1
Nacional	2020–21	Primeira Liga	17	0	2	0	0	0	—		19	0
Vorskla Poltava	2021–22	Ukrainian Premier League	0	0	0	0	—		—		0	0
Career total			68	13	6	0	3	0	0	0	77	13

=== International ===
As of match played 16 November 2026

Appearances and goals by national team and year
National team	Year	Apps	Goals
Luxembourg	2016	7	1
Luxembourg	2017	6	0
Luxembourg	2018	5	1
Luxembourg	2019	11	1
Luxembourg	2020	7	0
Luxembourg	2021	2	0
Luxembourg	2022	7	0
Luxembourg	2023	8	0
Luxembourg	2024	0	0
Luxembourg	2025	4	0
Luxembourg	2026	10	3
Total		67	6

As of match played 29 September 2026
Scores and results list Luxembourg's goal tally first, score column indicates score after each Thill goal.

List of international goals scored by Vincent Thill
No.	Date	Venue	Cap	Opponent	Score	Result	Competition
1	31 May 2016	Stade Josy Barthel, Luxembourg City, Luxembourg	2	Nigeria	1–2	1–3	Friendly
2	15 October 2018	Stade Josy Barthel, Luxembourg City, Luxembourg	18	San Marino	3–0	3–0	2018–19 UEFA Nations League D
3	2 June 2019	Stade Josy Barthel, Luxembourg City, Luxembourg	21	Madagascar	1–0	3–3	Friendly
4	26 March 2026	National Stadium, Ta' Qali, Malta	58	Malta	1–0	2–0	2024–25 UEFA Nations League promotion/relegation play-offs
5	31 March 2026	Stade de Luxembourg, Luxembourg City, Luxembourg	59	Malta	1–0	3–0	2024–25 UEFA Nations League promotion/relegation play-offs
6	26 September 2026	Hristo Botev Stadium, Plovdiv, Bulgaria	62	Bulgaria	2–1	2–1	2026–27 UEFA Nations League C

== Honours ==
Sabah

- Azerbaijan Cup: 2024–25
