= Sébastien Thill =

Luxembourgish footballer

Personal information
- Date of birth: 29 December 1993 (age 32)
- Place of birth: Niederkorn, Luxembourg
- Height: 1.78 m (5 ft 10 in)
- Position: Midfielder

Team information
- Current team: Differdange 03
- Number: 31

Senior career*
| Years | Team | Apps | (Gls) |
| 2009–2012 | Pétange | 46 | (9) |
| 2012–2022 | Progrès Niederkorn | 191 | (44) |
| 2020 | → Tambov (loan) | 7 | (0) |
| 2021–2022 | → Sheriff Tiraspol (loan) | 36 | (10) |
| 2022–2023 | Hansa Rostock | 10 | (0) |
| 2023 | Hansa Rostock II | 5 | (1) |
| 2023–2026 | Stal Rzeszów | 80 | (14) |
| 2026– | Differdange 03 | 8 | (2) |

International career^{‡}
| 2015– | Luxembourg | 51 | (2) |
- * Club domestic league appearances and goals as of 18:55, 26 September 2026 (UTC) ‡ National team caps and goals as of 15:15, 15 November 2026 (UTC)

Sébastien Thill (born 29 December 1993) is a Luxembourgish professional footballer who plays as a midfielder for Luxembourg National Division club Differdange 03 and the Luxembourg national team.

== Club career ==
=== Luxembourg ===
From 2009 to 2012, Thill played for Pétange of the Luxembourg National Division, scoring nine goals in 46 league appearances.

In 2013, he moved to fellow National Division side Progrès Niederkorn. In 2015, Thill made his debut in European club competition as Niederkorn fell 3–0 on aggregate to Shamrock Rovers in a two-leg series during the first qualifying round of the 2015–16 UEFA Europa League.

On 4 July 2017, Thill scored the winning goal in an unexpected 2–1 aggregate win against Scottish side Rangers for his current club, Progrès Niederkorn, in the UEFA Europa League first qualifying round. The goal sealed Progrès' first ever win in European Competition.

On 5 September 2020, he joined Russian club Tambov on a season-long loan. His brother Olivier also played in the Russian league.

=== Sheriff Tiraspol ===
On 20 January 2021, he joined Moldovan league club Sheriff Tiraspol on a 1.5-year loan. While on loan at the Moldovan club based in Transnistrian region, he earned headlines with a long range goal against Spanish giants Real Madrid to secure a 2–1 victory in the UEFA Champions League group stage. With his goal against Real Madrid on 28 September 2021, he became the first Luxembourgish player to score a goal in the tournament's history. Thill followed up this goal on the subsequent matchday with an equalising free-kick against reigning Italian champions Inter Milan.

=== Hansa Rostock ===
In June 2022, 2. Bundesliga club Hansa Rostock announced the signing of Thill for the 2022–23 season. On 31 August 2023, Thill's contract with Hansa was terminated by mutual consent.

=== Stal Rzeszów ===
The following day, Thill joined Polish I liga side Stal Rzeszów on a one-year deal. Regularly featuring in the starting line-up across the 2023–24 season, he signed a two-year contract extension on 22 May 2024.

=== Differdange 03 ===
On 20 June 2026, Thill signed a two-year contract with Luxembourgish club Differdange 03.

== International career ==
Thill made his senior international debut for Luxembourg on 5 September 2015 in a UEFA Euro 2016 qualifying match against Macedonia. In the match, Thill scored in second-half stoppage time for his first international goal as Luxembourg earned a 1–0 victory, lifting them from the bottom position in Group C.

== Personal life ==
Thill is the older brother of fellow Luxembourg internationals Olivier Thill and Vincent Thill. He is also the son of former international footballers Nathalie and Serge Thill.

== Career statistics ==
=== International ===
As of match played 13 November 2026

Appearances and goals by national team and year
| National team | Year | Apps | Goals |
|---|---|---|---|
| Luxembourg | 2015 | 4 | 1 |
| Luxembourg | 2016 | 3 | 0 |
| Luxembourg | 2017 | 2 | 0 |
| Luxembourg | 2018 | 0 | 0 |
| Luxembourg | 2019 | 0 | 0 |
| Luxembourg | 2020 | 1 | 0 |
| Luxembourg | 2021 | 10 | 1 |
| Luxembourg | 2022 | 10 | 0 |
| Luxembourg | 2023 | 5 | 0 |
| Luxembourg | 2024 | 4 | 0 |
| Luxembourg | 2025 | 4 | 0 |
| Luxembourg | 2026 | 8 | 0 |
| Total | | 51 | 2 |

Scores and results list Luxembourg's goal tally first, score column indicates score after each Thill goal.

List of international goals scored by Sébastien Thill
| No. | Date | Venue | Opponent | Score | Result | Competition |
|---|---|---|---|---|---|---|
| 1 | 5 September 2015 | Stade Josy Barthel, Luxembourg City, Luxembourg | Macedonia | 1–0 | 1–0 | UEFA Euro 2016 qualifying |
| 2 | 11 November 2021 | Bakı Olimpiya Stadionu, Baku, Azerbaijan | Azerbaijan | 2–0 | 3–1 | 2022 FIFA World Cup qualification |

== Honours ==
Sheriff Tiraspol

- Moldovan National Division: 2020–21, 2021–22
- Moldovan Cup: 2021–22
