= Guillaume Trani =

French footballer (born 1997)

Personal information
- Date of birth: 17 December 1997 (age 28)
- Place of birth: Marseille, France
- Height: 1.78 m (5 ft 10 in)
- Position: Midfielder

Team information
- Current team: Red Star
- Number: 8

Youth career
- Nike Academy

Senior career*
Years	Team	Apps	(Gls)
2017–2020	Marseille Endoume	57	(4)
2020–2022	Hostert	49	(16)
2022–2025	Differdange 03	78	(30)
2025–	Red Star	15	(1)
- * Club domestic league appearances and goals as of 11 May 2026

Guillaume Trani (born 17 December 1997) is a French professional footballer who plays as a midfielder for Ligue 2 club Red Star.

== Early life ==
As a youth player, Trani joined the youth academy of English side Nike Academy. He played against the youth academies of English Premier League sides while playing for the club.

== Career ==
In 2022, Trani signed for Luxembourgish side Differdange 03. He was described as "managed to establish himself [in the league] since he was part of the ideal team [of the season]".

In June 2025, Trani joined Ligue 2 club Red Star.

== Style of play ==
Trani mainly operates as a midfielder. He is known for his versatility.

== Personal life ==
Trani is a native of Marseille, France.
