= Alexandre Delarboulas =

Ivorian footballer (born 1997)

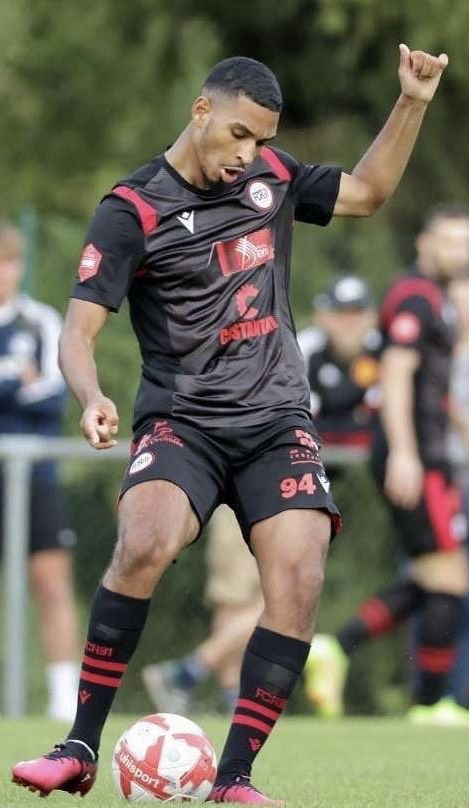

Personal information
- Full name: Alexandre Thibault Delarboulas
- Date of birth: 22 January 1997 (age 29)
- Place of birth: Paris, France
- Height: 1.85 m (6 ft 1 in)
- Position: Centre-back

Team information
- Current team: RSC Habay-la-Neuve
- Number: 94

Senior career*
Years	Team	Apps	(Gls)
2016-2018	Boulogne-Billancourt	68	(5)
2018–2019	Club Olympique Avallonnais	24	(4)
2019-2020	Is-Selongey Football	29	(0)
2020-2021	RC Lons-le-Saunier	32	(2)
2021-2022	FC Valdahon Vercel	25	(3)
2022–2023	Syrianska	28	(0)
2023–2025	Rodange 91	55	(2)
2025–	RSC Habay-la-Neuve	29	(0)

International career
2017	Ivory Coast U20	3	(0)
- * Club domestic league appearances and goals as of 28 June 2026

Alexandre Thibault Delarboulas (born 22 January 1997) is a professional footballer who plays as a centre-back for RSC Habay-la-Neuve. Born in France, he is a youth international for the Ivory Coast.

== Club career ==
Born in Paris, Delarboulas began his youth career with local clubs Creteil U19 and Bretigny U17. He began his professional career in 2016 after joining Boulogne-Billancourt.

He signed with Club Olympique Avallonnais in July 2018.

Ahead of the 2019–20 season, Delarboulas joined Is-Selongey Football.

In July 2020, Delarboulas agreed to join French club RC Lons-le-Saunier. After a short spell at RC Lons-le-Saunier, he signed a one-year deal with FC Valdahon Vercel on 1 July 2021.

In 2022, Delarboulas moved to Sweden to play with second division club Syrianska FC.

After a one-season-and-a half at Syrianska FC, he signed on to play for Rodange 91 on 1 July 2023.

== International career ==
Delarboulas is a youth international for Ivory Coast. In May 2017, he was called up to the Ivory Coast U-20 team ahead of 2017 Toulon Tournament.
