= Tom Siebenaler =

Luxembourgish footballer

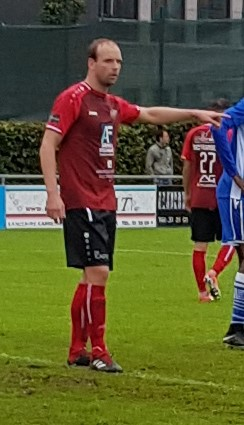
- Siebenaler in September 2019.

Personal information
- Date of birth: 28 September 1990 (age 36)
- Place of birth: Luxembourg
- Height: 1.92 m (6 ft 4 in)
- Position: Centre back

Senior career*
Years	Team	Apps	(Gls)
2006–2009	Grevenmacher	18	(1)
2009–2019	Differdange 03	215	(14)
2019–2023	UNA Strassen	71	(3)
2023–2025	Käerjéng 97	43	(1)

International career^{‡}
- Luxembourg U19
2009–2012	Luxembourg U21	13	(0)
2011	Luxembourg	1	(0)
- * Club domestic league appearances and goals as of 31 May 2025 ‡ National team caps and goals as of 26 July 2020

Tom Siebenaler (born 28 September 1990) is a retired Luxembourgish international footballer who played as a defender.
