= Donovan Maury =

Belgian footballer

Donovan Eric Maury
Personal information
- Full name: Donovan Eric Maury
- Date of birth: 8 May 1981 (age 45)
- Place of birth: Libramont-Chevigny, Belgium
- Height: 1.86 m (6 ft 1 in)
- Position: Right back

Youth career
- Standard Liège

Senior career*
Years	Team	Apps	(Gls)
2001–2002	Perugia	0	(0)
2002–2003	Roda JC	1	(0)
2003–2004	Sambenedettese	19	(0)
2004–2005	Pro Vasto	24	(0)
2005–2006	Benevento	26	(0)
2006–2007	Teramo	27	(0)
2007–2008	Sorrento	30	(1)
2008–2013	Juve Stabia	116	(4)
2013–2015	Dudelange	39	(2)
2015–2016	Sorrento	0	(0)
2016–2017	FC UNA Strassen	12	(0)
2017–2022	RUS Ethe Belmont	?	(?)
- * Club domestic league appearances and goals as of 19 December 2015

Donovan Eric Maury (born 8 May 1981) is a Belgian former football defender.

== Career ==
Amid interest from U.S. Lecce and Genoa C.F.C., he was signed by Luciano Gaucci at his club Perugia as part of the then-Serie A club's strategy to sign relatively unknown players from abroad. However, Maury never succeeded to break into the first team and was loaned out to Roda JC in November 2002, and then sold permanently to Serie C1 club Sambenedettese, owned by Gaucci as well at the time and mostly handled as a sort of Perugia reserve team, in 2003.

After Gaucci's exit from Sambenedettese, Maury was sold to Serie C2 club Pro Vasto in 2004; this was followed by a number of moves within the lower ranks of Italian football until 2008, when he joined then-Serie C1 club Juve Stabia. After relegation in 2009, Maury opted to stay in and became a mainstay for the team and a protagonist in two back-to-back promotions that brought the small Campanian club to Serie B in 2011. Following that, he was also awarded team captaincy at Juve Stabia.

In January 2013, Donovan Maury left Juve stabia to join Luxembourgish National Division side F91 Dudelange. On 4 July 2013, he made his debut in European competition. He plays the game of the 1st turn qualification for the UEFA Europa League against Milsami Orhei.
