= VictoriArena =

Football stadium in Rosport, Luxembourg

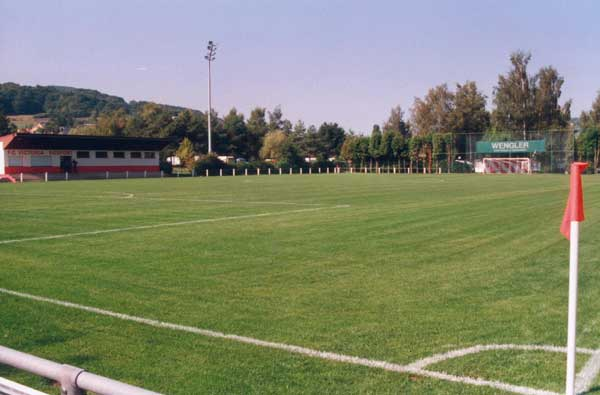
- VictoriArena, Rosport, Luxembourg
- Interactive map of VictoriArena
- Full name: VictoriArena
- Location: Rosport, Luxembourg
- Coordinates: 49.8085°N 6.5057°E
- Capacity: 2,500
- Surface: grass

Tenant
- FC Victoria Rosport

VictoriArena is a football stadium in Rosport, in eastern Luxembourg and is currently the home stadium of FC Victoria Rosport. The stadium has a capacity of 2,500.
