= Yan Bouché =

Luxembourgish footballer (born 1999)

Yan Bouché (born 19 March 1999) is a Luxembourgish footballer who plays as a winger or striker for FC Victoria Rosport.

== Early life ==
Bouché started playing football at the age of four.

== Career ==
In 2019, Bouché signed for Luxembourgish side Racing FC Union Luxembourg.

== Style of play ==
Bouché mainly operates as a winger or striker and is known for his speed.

== Personal life ==
Bouché has trained to become a teacher.
