= Marco Martino (football manager) =

Luxembourgish football manager (born 1994)

Personal information
- Date of birth: 8 June 1994 (age 32)
- Place of birth: Luxembourg

Senior career*
Years	Team	Apps	(Gls)
- FC Kehlen

Managerial career
- 2011–2014: FC Kehlen (youth)
- 2014–2015: US Hostert (youth)
- 2016–2021: FC UNA Strassen (youth)
- 2017–2019: FC UNA Strassen (assistant)
- 2017: FC UNA Strassen
- 2021–2023: FC Kehlen
- 2023–2024: Racing FC Union Luxembourg
- 2024–: F91 Dudelange
- * Club domestic league appearances and goals

Marco Martino (born 8 June 1994) is a Luxembourgish football manager who manages F91 Dudelange.

== Life and career ==
Martino was born on 8 June 1994 in Luxembourg. He is a native of Kehlen, Luxembourg. He is of Italian descent. He has a younger brother. He played for FC Kehlen. He studied sports management. He has been regarded to prefer the 4-2-3-1 formation. He obtained the UEFA A License. In 2011, he was appointed as a youth manager of FC Kehlen. In 2014, he was appointed as a youth manager of US Hostert. In 2016, he was appointed as a youth manager of FC UNA Strassen.

In 2017, he was appointed as an assistant manager of the club. He worked as assistant to Luxembourgish managers Manuel Correia, Roland Schaack, and Patrick Grettnich. After that, he was appointed manager of the club. On 24 August 2017, he managed his first game for them during a 1–1 draw with Racing FC Union Luxembourg. He became the youngest manager to manage in the Luxembourgish top flight. In 2021, he returned as manager of FC Kehlen. In 2023, he was appointed manager of Racing FC Union Luxembourg. In 2024, he was appointed manager of F91 Dudelange. He managed the club in the UEFA Conference League.
