= Frederick Kyereh =

German footballer

Personal information
- Date of birth: 18 October 1993 (age 33)
- Place of birth: Saarbrücken, Germany
- Position: Forward

Team information
- Current team: Victoria Rosport
- Number: 9

Youth career
- –2012: SV Elversberg

Senior career*
Years	Team	Apps	(Gls)
2012–2014	SV Elversberg II	31	(3)
2013–2015	SV Elversberg	37	(2)
2015–2017	Energie Cottbus II	9	(3)
2015–2016	Energie Cottbus	9	(0)
2017–2021	Jeunesse Esch	64	(14)
2021	FC UNA Strassen	13	(2)
2021–2025	Etzella Ettelbruck	105	(25)
2025–	Victoria Rosport	29	(9)
- * Club domestic league appearances and goals as of 13 June 2026

Frederick Kyereh (born 18 October 1993) is a German footballer who plays for Victoria Rosport in the Luxembourg National Division.
