= Cédric Sacras =

Luxembourgish footballer

Personal information
- Date of birth: 28 August 1996 (age 30)
- Place of birth: Luxembourg
- Height: 6 ft 0 in (1.83 m)
- Position: Defender

Team information
- Current team: Progrès Niederkorn
- Number: 14

Youth career
- –2011: Swift Hesperange
- 2011–2015: Metz

Senior career*
Years	Team	Apps	(Gls)
2013–2016	Metz B	22	(0)
2016–2021	Fola Esch	97	(3)
2021–2024	Swift Hesperange	58	(2)
2024–	Progrès Niederkorn	40	(0)

International career
2016	Luxembourg	2	(0)
- * Club domestic league appearances and goals as of 6 June 2026

Cédric Sacras (born 28 September 1996) is a Luxembourger footballer who plays as a defender for Progrès Niederkorn in the Luxembourg National Division. He made two appearances for the Luxembourg national team in 2016.

== Club career ==
Sacras began his career as a footballer at the club Swift Hesperange in Luxembourg. He excelled in the youth group of the club, where he was noticed and then supervised by Ligue 1 side Metz. He finally signed a youth contract with Metz in 2011. From 2013 until the beginning of the 2016–17 season, he played for the reserve team at Metz who then played in the CFA and later the CFA 2. He played both in the position of left back and central defender.

At the beginning of the 2016–17 season, he was unable to sign a full professional contract with Metz to join the first team, so instead signed for Fola Esch.

== International career ==
Sacras has played in two games for the Luxembourg national team.

He made his debut on 29 March 2016 against Albania in a 2–0 loss as an 86th-minute substitute for Ricardo Delgado at the Stade Josy Barthel. He played in his second game against Nigeria in a 3–1 loss, also as a substitute.
