= Ken Corral =

Luxembourgish footballer (born 1992)

Personal information
- Full name: Ken Corral Garcia
- Date of birth: 8 May 1992 (age 34)
- Place of birth: Luxembourg
- Positions: Winger; striker

Team information
- Current team: Progrès Niederkorn
- Number: 77

Senior career*
Years	Team	Apps	(Gls)
2011–2014	UN Käerjéng 97	62	(19)
2014–2017	Jeunesse Esch	72	(15)
2017–2020	Fola Esch	46	(14)
2020–2023	Swift Hesperange	38	(8)
2024	UN Käerjéng 97	15	(1)
2024–	Progrès Niederkorn	43	(2)
- * Club domestic league appearances and goals as of 6 June 2026

Ken Corral Garcia (born 8 May 1992) is a Luxembourgish footballer who plays as a winger or striker for Progrès Niederkorn.

== Personal life ==
Corral was born to a Spanish father and Luxembourgish mother. He studied law in Strasbourg, France.

== Club career ==
Corral debuted for Luxembourgish side UN Käerjéng 97 in April 2011. In 2014, he signed for Luxembourgish side Jeunesse Esch, where he was regarded as one of the club's most important players. In 2017, he signed for Luxembourgish side Fola Esch, where he was regarded as one of the club's most important players.

== International career ==
In 2023, Corral was called up to the Luxembourg national football team for UEFA Euro 2024 qualifying.

== Style of play ==
Corral mainly operates as a winger or striker and is known for his speed.
