= Dylan Lempereur =

French footballer (born 1998)

Personal information
- Full name: Dylan Lempereur
- Date of birth: 24 October 1998 (age 28)
- Place of birth: Rombas, France
- Height: 1.78 m (5 ft 10 in)
- Position: Left-back

Team information
- Current team: Differdange
- Number: 32

Youth career
- 2003–2013: UL Rombas
- 2013–2015: CSO Amnéville
- 2015–2017: Metz

Senior career*
Years	Team	Apps	(Gls)
2017–2019	Metz II	23	(1)
2018–2019	Metz	3	(0)
2019–2020	Sarre-Union	3	(0)
2020–2023	Differdange	72	(5)
2023–2024	Resovia	20	(0)
2024–	Differdange	40	(1)
- * Club domestic league appearances and goals as of 13 June 2026

Dylan Lempereur (born 24 October 1998) is a French professional footballer who plays as a left-back for Differdange.

== Professional career ==
Lempereur first begun his football training with his local club, UL Rombas, before moving to CSO Amnéville at the age of 15. After a couple of successful seasons there, he moved to Troyes AC and signed a three-year contract with them.

He then moved to FC Metz, and made his professional debut with then in a 2–2 (3–2) Coupe de France overtime loss to SM Caen on 7 February 2018. He made his league debut in a 2–2 Ligue 1 tie with En Avant de Guingamp on 24 February 2018. In 2019, Lempereur had a stint with the amateur club Sarre-Union, before joining Differdange in Luxembourg in January 2020.

On 4 August 2023, Lempereur joined Polish I liga side Resovia on a one-year deal, with an extension option. Resovia was relegated at the end of the 2023–24 season, and Lempereur left the club in June 2024.

== Honours ==
Differdange

- Luxembourg Cup: 2022–23
