= Samir Hadji =

Moroccan footballer (born 1989)

Personal information
- Full name: Samir Hadji
- Date of birth: 12 September 1989 (age 37)
- Place of birth: Creutzwald, France
- Height: 1.90 m (6 ft 3 in)
- Position: Striker

Team information
- Current team: Progrès Niederkorn
- Number: 25

Youth career
- 2000–2007: SR Creutzwald

Senior career*
Years	Team	Apps	(Gls)
2007–2009	1. FC Saarbrücken	2	(1)
2009–2010	Nancy B	59	(18)
2010–2011	Strasbourg	11	(1)
2011–2012	Hassania Agadir	3	(0)
2012–2019	Fola Esch	174	(110)
2019–2020	Excelsior Virton	10	(1)
2021–2025	F91 Dudelange	117	(72)
2025–2026	Differdange 03	29	(12)
2026–	Progrès Niederkorn		

International career^{‡}
2011	Morocco U23	1	(0)
- * Club domestic league appearances and goals as of 13 June 2026 ‡ National team caps and goals as of 08:11, 3 November 2022 (UTC)

Samir Hadji (born 12 September 1989) is a footballer who plays for Luxembourgish club Progrès Niederkorn as a striker. Born in France, he has represented Morocco at youth level.

== Personal life ==
He is the son of former Moroccan international Mustapha Hadji. Hadji's uncle is former AS Nancy striker Youssouf Hadji. He is described by his uncle as a "quick and athletic finisher". His brother Zachary Hadji is also a professional footballer.

== Career ==
Hadji began his career playing for hometown club SR Creutzwald. In 2007, he ventured to Germany signing with 1. FC Saarbrücken in the Oberliga, the fifth division of German football. After two years, Hadji returned to France joining his father's former club AS Nancy. He spent two years playing on the club's Championnat de France amateur team making 59 appearances and scoring 18 goals before signing with RC Strasbourg in July 2010. Hadji made his professional debut on 30 July 2010 in the team's Coupe de la Ligue match against Évian. Hadji started the match and played the full 120 minutes as Strasbourg were defeated 5–4 on penalties.

After playing for Folasch in the Luxembourg National Division, Hadji moved to Excelsior Virton in 2019.

Hadji returned to Luxembourg in 2021 to play for F91 Dudelange, Differdange 03, and Progrès Niederkorn.

== International career ==
Hadji made one appearance for the Morocco U23s in a 0–0 tie with the Niger U23s on 1 November 2011.

== Honours ==
Fola Esch

- BGL Ligue : 2012–13, 2014–15

== Statistics ==
As of matches played 18 July 2016

Club performance			League		Cup		Continental		Other		Total	
Season	Club	League	Apps	Goals	Apps	Goals	Apps	Goals	Apps	Goals	Apps	Goals
2008–09	1. FC Saarbrücken	Oberliga	2	1	–	–	–	–	–	–	2	1
2009–10	AS Nancy B	Division 4	59	18	–	–	–	–	–	–	59	18
2010–11	Strasbourg	Division 3	–	–	1	0	–	–	1	0	2	0
2011–12	Hassania Agadir	Botola	3	0	–	–	–	–	–	–	3	0
2012–12	Fola Esch	BGL Ligue	24	6	–	–	–	–	–	–	24	6
2013–14	Fola Esch	BGL Ligue	25	12	1	1	2	0	–	–	28	13
2014–15	Fola Esch	BGL Ligue	25	11	3	4	2	0	–	–	30	15
2015–16	Fola Esch	BGL Ligue	13	7	2	2	2	1	–	–	17	10
Career total			151	53	7	7	6	1	1	0	167	61
