= Jamath Shoffner =

American soccer player and coach (born 1978)

Personal information
- Date of birth: July 10, 1978 (age 48)
- Place of birth: Greensboro, North Carolina, United States
- Height: 1.75 m (5 ft 9 in)
- Positions: Defender; midfielder

Team information
- Current team: OH Leuven (assistant manager)

Senior career*
Years	Team	Apps	(Gls)
2001	Carolina Dynamo	5	(0)
2001–2002	Shelbourne	5	(0)
2002–2003	Borussia Neunkirchen	15	(0)
2003	Virginia Beach Mariners	6	(0)
- SV Weil
	Avenir Beggen		(2)
2009–2010	UN Käerjéng 97	15	(1)

Managerial career
- 2005–2008: Montreat Cavaliers
- 2011–2014: Wayland Baptist University
- 2015–2017: Luxembourg (assistant)
- 2017–2018: Luxembourg U19
- 2019–2020: Virton
- 2021–2022: Jeunesse Canach
- 2022: Charlotte FC (assistant)
- 2023–2024: F91 Dudelange
- 2024: Oostende
- 2024–2026: Lierse
- 2026–: OH Leuven (assistant)
- * Club domestic league appearances and goals

Jamath Shoffner (born July 10, 1978) is an American professional soccer coach and former player. He is currently assistant manager at Belgian Pro League club OH Leuven. A former defender and midfielder, Shoffner played professionally in Ireland, Germany and Luxembourg. He is among a small number of American coaches to hold a UEFA Pro Licence.

== Playing career ==
Shoffner was born in Greensboro, North Carolina. He attended the University of North Carolina at Charlotte from 1996 to 2000, where he played college soccer for the Charlotte 49ers. During his collegiate career, the program reached the NCAA College Cup semi-finals and achieved a national ranking of second in NCAA Division I.

Shoffner began his professional career with Shelbourne in the League of Ireland Premier Division, joining the club shortly after it qualified for the UEFA Champions League. He made his home debut in a friendly match against Manchester United.

He later played in Germany for Borussia Neunkirchen, where he was part of the squad that won the Saarland Cup. After brief spells in the United States, Shoffner continued his career in Luxembourg, competing in the BGL League for Avenir Beggen and UN Käerjéng 97. At Käerjéng, he started both of the club's matches in European competition.

== Coaching career ==
Shoffner began his coaching career in Europe in Luxembourg, where he worked with various youth national teams and later served as an assistant coach with the senior national team during FIFA World Cup qualification campaigns. He was also part of the coaching staff of the United States under-20 national team at the 2019 FIFA U-20 World Cup in Poland.

He subsequently worked as an assistant coach at Virton in Belgium under Dino Toppmöller.

Shoffner was later appointed head coach of Jeunesse Canach in Luxembourg. During the season, the club moved clear of the relegation places and finished in the top half of the table, including a strong run of results in the second phase of the league.

In 2022, Shoffner joined the coaching staff of Charlotte FC in Major League Soccer, working under head coach Christian Lattanzio.

In June 2023, Shoffner was appointed head coach of F91 Dudelange in the Luxembourg National Division. During the 2023–24 season, the club recorded multiple victories in the UEFA Europa Conference League, including two wins against St Patrick's Athletic. Shoffner resigned from his position in January 2024.

Later that month, Shoffner was appointed head coach of Oostende in the Challenger Pro League. He guided the club to the semi-finals of the Belgian Cup before the club was declared bankrupt in June 2024.

On December 12, 2024, Shoffner was appointed head coach of Lierse in the Challenger Pro League. At the end of the 2025-26 season, Shoffner and Lierse parted ways.

== Managerial statistics ==
Club	Tenure	Matches	Wins	Draws	Losses	Win %
FC 91 Dudelange	2023 - 2024	19	12	2	5	63.2
KV Oostende	2024	16	7	2	7	43.8
Lierse SK	2024 - Present	13	5	3	5	38.5

Statistics as of May 2025
