= FC Alisontia Steinsel =

Association football club in Luxembourg

Alisontia Steinsel
- Full name: Football Club Alisontia Steisel
- Founded: 1933; 93 years ago
- Ground: Stade Henri Bausch, Steinsel
- Capacity: 1,500
- President: Patrick Olm
- Manager: Helder Dias
- League: 1. Division Series 1
- 2025–26: Division of Honour, 16th of 16 (relegated)
- Website: www.fcsteinsel.lu

FC Alisontia Steisel is a football club based in Steinsel, Luxembourg. They currently compete in the 1. Division Series 1, the third tier of Luxembourgish football, and play at the Stade Henri Bausch.

== History ==
The club was founded in 1933 under its current name. During the German occupation of Luxembourg in World War II, the club was forcibly renamed SpVgg Steinsel. In 1944, it was renamed FC Alisontia.

With the exception of the years 1949 to 1955, the club never made it past the fourth division. It was not until 2009 that it managed to return to the third-tier 1st Division for one season. After being promoted to the third-highest division again, Alisontia immediately achieved runner-up status in 2015–16. This meant reaching the play-off match against the 11th-placed team in the honorary promotion. Avenir Beggen won there 4–1. After two third places, Alisontia was promoted to the second-highest division for the first time in 2019.
