= FC Minerva Lintgen =

Association football club in Luxembourg

F.C. Minerva Lintgen
- Full name: Football Club Minerva Lintgen
- Founded: 1910; 116 years ago
- Ground: Stade Jean Donnersbach, Lintgen
- Capacity: 1,700
- Manager: Olivier Lickes
- League: 1. Division Series 1
- 2025–26: 1. Division Series 1, 5th of 16
- Website: www.fcminerva.lu

Football Club Minerva Lintgen is a football club, based in Lintgen, in central Luxembourg. They play in the 1. Division Series 1, the third tier of Luxembourgish football.

In the 2024–25 Luxembourg Cup, Minerva reached the quarter-finals while playing in the 2. Division, the 4th tier of Luxembourgish football, making it further than any Division of Honour or 1. Division side, after beating fellow 4th tier side Boevange-Attert in the first round, upsetting Division of Honour side Atert Bissen in the second round, beating 1. Division side Daring Echternach on penalties in the round of 32 and defeating 1. Division side The Belval Belvaux in the round of 16, before losing to BGL Ligue side Racing FC 4-0 in the quarter-finals. This is the furthest run in the cup to date by a club from a 2. Division side.
