= FF Norden 02 =

Association football club in Luxembourg

- Full name: FF Norden 02 Weiswampach-Hupperdange
- Founded: 3 May 2002; 24 years ago
- Ground: Stade Auf dem Kiemel, Weiswampach
- Capacity: 1,700
- President: Olli Bresch
- Manager: Nesad Omerasevic
- League: 1. Division Series 1
- 2025–26: 1. Division Series 1, 4th of 16
- Website: www.ffnorden02.lu
Home colours	Away colours

FF Norden 02 Weiswampach-Hupperdange is an association football club based in the Weiswampach, in northern Luxembourg. They currently compete in the 1. Division Series 1, the third tier of Luxembourgish football.

The club was founded in 2002 as the amalgamation of FC Les Montagnards Weiswampach and FC Blo-Giel-Hupperdange.

== History ==
FC Les Montagnards Weiswampach were founded in 1966 and played most of their time in the 4th tier.

FC Blo-Giel-Hupperdange were originally founded in 1946, playing most of their existence in the 5th tier.

At the end of the 2001–02 season, the two clubs merged and took the place of both clubs in the 5th tier.

In 2014–15, the club won their first trophy - the Coupe FLF - by beating Atert Bissen 3–1.
