= FC Kehlen =

Association football club in Luxembourg

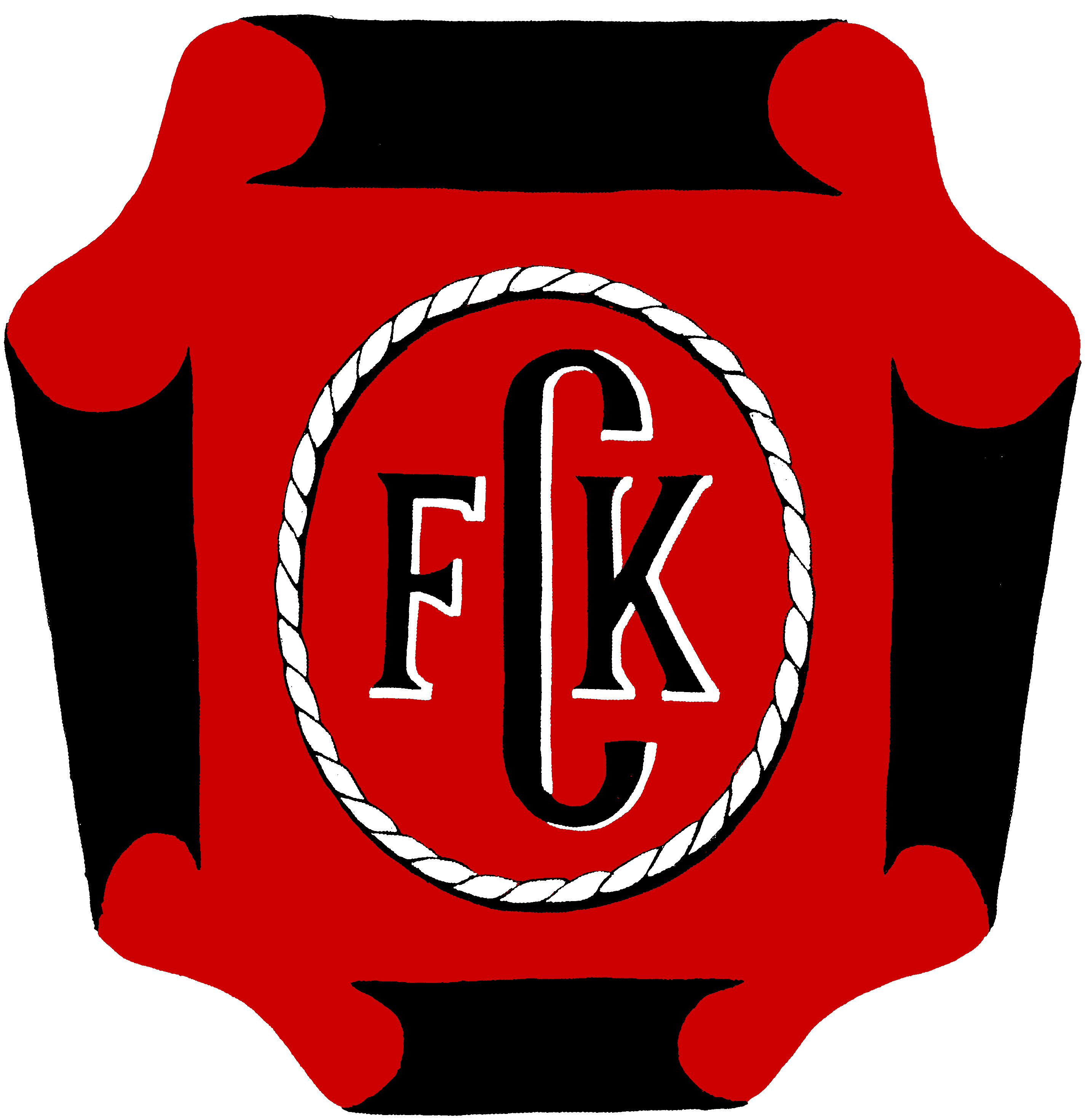
- Full name: Football Club Kehlen
- Nickname: Rout-Schwaarz
- Founded: 23 May 1946; 80 years ago
- Ground: Stade Albert Berchem, Kehlen, Luxembourg
- Capacity: 1,700
- Chairman: Fred Keup
- Manager: René Rippinger
- League: 1. Division Series 1
- 2025–26: 1. Division Series 1, 3rd of 16
- Website: www.fckielen.lu
Home colours	Away colours

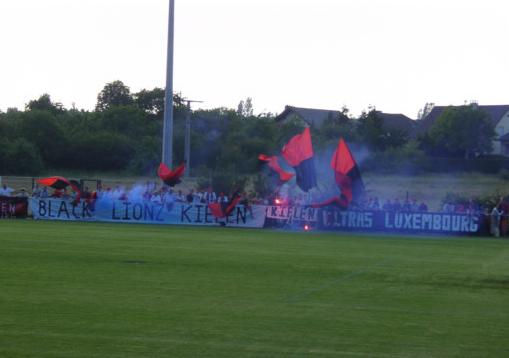
FC Kehlen ultras

FC Kehlen (in luxembourgish: FC Kielen) is a Luxembourgish football club located in Kehlen, Luxembourg. It currently plays in the 1. Division Series 2, the third tier of Luxembourgish football. The team's colors are red and black.
