= FC Victoria Rosport =

Association football club in Luxembourg

Victoria Rosport
- Full name: Football Club Victoria Rosport
- Founded: 1 October 1928; 98 years ago
- Ground: Party-Rent-Arena, Rosport
- Capacity: 1,500
- Chairman: Guy Reiter
- Manager: Dean Léen
- League: National Division
- 2025–26: National Division, 10th of 16
- Website: https://www.fcvictoria.lu/
Home colours	Away colours

Football Club Victoria Rosport is a football club based in Rosport, eastern Luxembourg, competing in the National Division, the top tier of Luxembourgish football. Their home stadium, the Party-Rent-Arena, has a capacity of 1,500.

In 2005, Rosport met IFK Göteborg in the first round of the Intertoto Cup. Because Rosport's stadium was not up to UEFA standards, the match was played at the national stadium, Stade Josy Barthel.

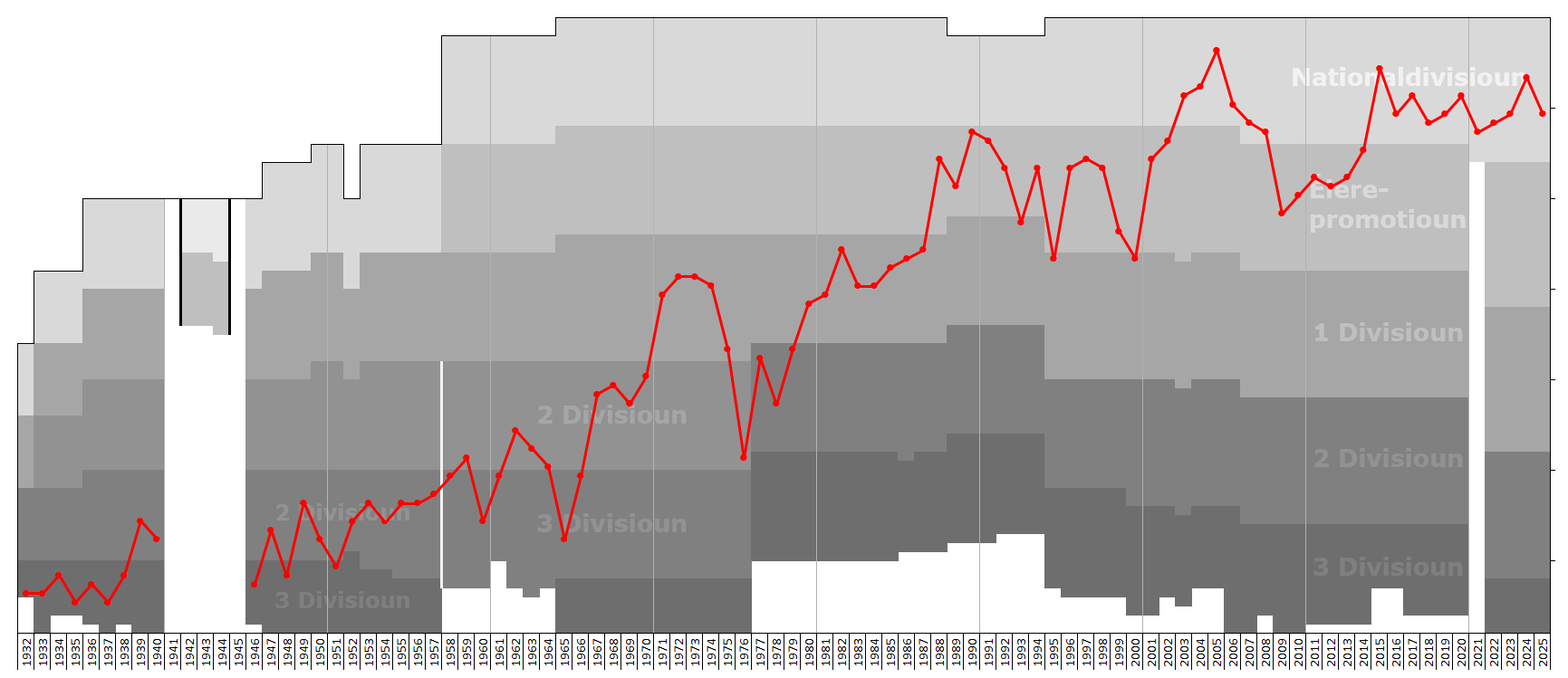
Historical league performance chart of Victoria Rosport

== Current squad ==
As of 15 September 2026

Note: Flags indicate national team as defined under FIFA eligibility rules; some limited exceptions apply. Players may hold more than one non-FIFA nationality.

No.	Pos.	Nation	Player
1	GK	LUX	Tim Schilz
2	DF	GER	Janik Faldey
4	MF	LUX	Michel Bechtold
6	DF	LUX	Goncalo Fernandes
7	MF	LUX	Kevin Marques
8	FW	LUX	Joé Neves Araujo
9	FW	GER	Frederick Kyereh
11	MF	POR	Santiago Gonçalves
13	MF	LUX	Ben Vogel
14	FW	CPV	Alexis Gonçalves
17	MF	LUX	Ruben Sousa
18	MF	POR	Diogo Gomes Pereira
19	MF	LUX	Stan Tombini

No.	Pos.	Nation	Player
20	MF	CRO	Marko Brkljača
21	DF	LUX	Lenn Hubert
22	GK	GER	Niklas Bürger
23	DF	LUX	Mattéo François
25	DF	FRA	Corentin Baudry
27	MF	RWA	Sven Kalisa
37	DF	GER	Dennis Schütte
77	MF	LUX	Albert Ferreira
93	MF	MRI	Jérémy Villeneuve
96	FW	BEL	Lucas Walbrecq
98	FW	LUX	Adis Halimovic
99	GK	LUX	Bobby Jiang
-	FW	BEL	Jordy Soladio
