= FC Progrès Niederkorn =

Association football club in Luxembourg

Progrès Niederkorn
- Full name: Football Club Progrès Niederkorn
- Founded: 14 August 1919; 107 years ago
- Ground: Stade Jos Haupert, Niederkorn
- Capacity: 2,800
- President: Thomas Gilgemann
- Head Coach: Vivian Reydel
- League: National Division
- 2025–26: National Division, 11th of 16
- Website: www.fcprogresniederkorn.lu
Home colours	Away colours

Football Club Progrès Niederkorn is a professional football club based in Niederkorn, Luxembourg. They currently compete in the National Division, the top tier of Luxembourgish football.

== History ==
The club was founded on 14 August 1919 as Cercle Sportif Progrès Niederkorn. During the German occupation of Luxembourg, the club played in the Gauliga Moselland under the name of FK Niederkorn, where it finished runners-up in 1942–43 behind champions TuS Neuendorf. Once football returned to Luxembourg in 1944 the club renamed itself the current FC Progrès Niederkorn name.

Three times domestic league winners, the club's most successful years were at the end of the 1970s and beginning of the 1980s. They haven't won a major trophy since the 1981 league title.

In the 2005–06 season, Niederkorn finished second in Luxembourg's second division, the Division of Honour. As the top league, the National Division, expanded from twelve teams to fourteen, Niederkorn were promoted along with Differdange 03.

In the 2016–17 Luxembourg National Division, Progrès Niederkorn drew the league's highest attendance that year: 1,820. Their average home attendance was 710.

On 4 July 2017, Progrès beat Scottish side Rangers in the 1st qualifying round of the 2017–18 UEFA Europa League. They overcame a 1–0 defeat at Ibrox with a 2–0 win at the Stade Josy Barthel, having scored only once before in European competition. This victory was also the club's first ever win in European football. They enjoyed an even greater campaign in the 2018–19 UEFA Europa League, defeating FK Gabala and Budapest Honvéd FC to reach the third qualifying round against Russian side FC Ufa. The tie seemed destined for extra-time but a last-minute goal for Ufa sent Progres out, denying them a rematch against Rangers in the play-offs.

== Honours ==
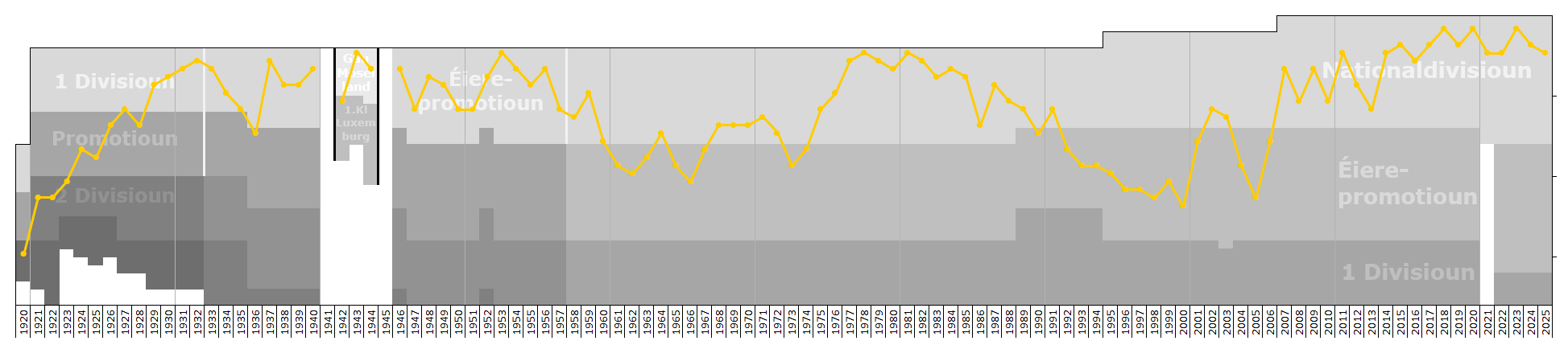
Historical league performance chart of FC Progrès Niederkorn

- National Division
  - Winners (3): 1952–53, 1977–78, 1980–81
  - Runners-up (7): 1931–32, 1936–37, 1976–77, 1978–79, 1981–82, 2017–18, 2022–23
- Luxembourg Cup
  - Winners (5): 1932–33, 1944–45, 1976–77, 1977–78, 2023–24
  - Runners-up (3): 1945–46, 1955–56, 1979–80

== European competition ==
Their first European goal was against Glentoran in the 1981–82 European Cup, where they drew 1–1.

=== Record by competition ===
Up to date as of match played 25 July 2024

Competition	Game	Won	Drawn	Lost	GF	GA
European Cup / UEFA Champions League	4	0	1	3	1	17
UEFA Cup / UEFA Europa League	24	6	3	16	18	34
UEFA Europa Conference League	6	3	1	2	7	8
UEFA Cup Winners' Cup / European Cup Winners' Cup	2	0	0	2	0	10
Overall	34	8	5	22	25	66

=== Matches ===
Season	Competition	Round	Opponent	Home	Away	Aggregate
1977–78	European Cup Winners' Cup	1R	(Denmark) Vejle Boldklub	0–1	0–9	0–10
1978–79	European Cup	1R	(Spain) Real Madrid	0–7	0–5	0–12
1979–80	UEFA Cup	1R	(Switzerland) Grasshopper Club Zürich	0–2	0–4	0–6
1981–82	European Cup	1R	(Northern Ireland) Glentoran	1–1	0–4	1–5
1982–83	UEFA Cup	1R	(Switzerland) Servette	0–1	0–3	0–4
2015–16	UEFA Europa League	1Q	(Republic of Ireland) Shamrock Rovers	0–0	0–3	0–3
2017–18	UEFA Europa League	1Q	(Scotland) Rangers	2–0	0–1	2–1
2017–18	UEFA Europa League	2Q	(Cyprus) AEL Limassol	0–1	1–2	1–3
2018–19	UEFA Europa League	1Q	(Azerbaijan) Gabala	0–1	2–0	2–1
2018–19	UEFA Europa League	2Q	(Hungary) Honvéd	2–0	0–1	2–1
2018–19	UEFA Europa League	3Q	(Russia) Ufa	2–2	1–2	3–4
2019–20	UEFA Europa League	PR	(Wales) Cardiff Metropolitan University	1–0	1–2	2–2 (a)
2019–20	UEFA Europa League	1Q	(Republic of Ireland) Cork City	1–2	2–0	3–2
2019–20	UEFA Europa League	2Q	(Scotland) Rangers	0–0	0–2	0–2
2020–21	UEFA Europa League	1Q	(Montenegro) Zeta	3–0	—N/a	—N/a
2020–21	UEFA Europa League	2Q	(Netherlands) Willem II	0–5	—N/a	—N/a
2023–24	UEFA Europa Conference League	1Q	(Kosovo) Gjilani	2–2	2–0	4–2
2023–24	UEFA Europa Conference League	2Q	(Denmark) Midtjylland	2–1 (a.e.t.)	0–2	2–3
2024–25	UEFA Conference League	2Q	(Sweden) Djurgårdens IF	1–0	0–3	1−3

== Current squad ==
As of 15 September 2026

Note: Flags indicate national team as defined under FIFA eligibility rules; some limited exceptions apply. Players may hold more than one non-FIFA nationality.

No.	Pos.	Nation	Player
1	GK	LUX	Andre Barrela
2	DF	FRA	Wassim Amadi
5	DF	LUX	Ricardo Delgado
7	FW	LUX	Ken Corral
8	MF	LUX	Marek Thill
9	FW	NIG	Ibrahim Baradji
11	DF	FRA	Milan Gilgemann
13	DF	FRA	Souleymane Cissé
14	DF	LUX	Cédric Sacras
15	MF	FRA	Thibaut Vion
17	MF	LUX	Mathias Camara
19	FW	FRA	Yan Bouché
20	MF	FRA	Mathieu Dauriac
21	FW	POR	Joao Costa

No.	Pos.	Nation	Player
23	MF	LUX	Clayton Duarte
25	FW	FRA	Samir Hadji
27	DF	FRA	Vincent Peugnet
29	DF	LUX	Mylan Oger
30	FW	FRA	Christian Kitenge
31	GK	LUX	João Margato
39	MF	LUX	Denis Ahmetxhekaj
71	MF	LUX	Flavjo Hoxha
72	GK	POR	Salvador Pachecho
80	FW	LUX	Kenan Avdusinović
88	MF	LUX	Diego Barroso
94	DF	FRA	Alexandre Delarboulas
99	GK	LUX	Rodolfo Ribeiro

=== Out on loan ===
Note: Flags indicate national team as defined under FIFA eligibility rules; some limited exceptions apply. Players may hold more than one non-FIFA nationality.

No.	Pos.	Nation	Player

== Women's team ==
The women's team plays in Luxembourg's highest league, the Dames Ligue 1. The team has won 15 championships and are therefore the national record champions. The last title was won in 2010–11, which qualified them for the 2011–12 UEFA Women's Champions League.
