= FC Differdange 03 =

Association football club in Luxembourg

Differdange 03
- Full name: Foussballclub Differdange 03
- Founded: 2003; 23 years ago
- Ground: Stade Municipal, Differdange
- Capacity: 3,500
- President: Fabrizio Bei
- Manager: Toninho Marques
- League: National Division
- 2025–26: National Division, 2nd of 16
- Website: www.fcd03.lu
Home colours	Away colours

Foussballclub Differdange 03 is a football club based in Differdange, Luxembourg. The club currently competes in the National Division, the top tier of Luxembourgish football. Founded in 2003, FDC03 played its home games in Stade Municipal de la Ville de Differdange, along with Stade du Thillenberg.

== History ==
It was founded in 2003, by a merge of 2 clubs from the city of Differdange: FA Red Boys Differdange and AS Differdange. When the clubs merged, in time for the 2003–04 season, Red Boys was languishing in the bottom half of the Division of Honour, while AS was in mid-table position in the third tier of Luxembourgish football. The new club took Red Boys league position, and was promoted back into the National Division in the 2005–06 season, when the top division was expanded from twelve clubs to fourteen.

Red Boys Differdange had previously been one of the largest and most successful teams in Luxembourgish football, having won the Luxembourg Cup more times than any other team (15). During the 1920s and 1930s, Red Boys competed with Spora Luxembourg for dominance of Luxembourgish football. Red Boys was the more successful of the two, and won thirteen trophies in as many years between 1923 and 1936. Despite the staunch competition (Spora won 8 trophies in the same period), this record has never been matched.

In the 2011–12 UEFA Europa League Differdange 03 progressed to the 3rd qualifying round of the competition after they eliminated Levadia Tallinn 1–0 on aggregate, one of the club's most famous European victories and one of the most historic victories for a club from Luxembourg has ever had in European Competitions. In the 3rd qualifying round they met Olympiacos Volos and lost 3–0 in both legs, 6–0 on aggregate. However, as Olympiacos Volos were presumably involved in a corruption case, UEFA decided on 11 August 2011 that Differdange would progress to the play-off round and meet Paris Saint-Germain, the furthest a club from Luxembourg had reached in European competitions at the time.

In June 2012, after a poor season in BGL League in which they placed 4th, FCD03 changed coach and Paolo Amodio was exempted. Michel Le Flochmoan was appointed as new coach as he is familiar in BGL League: with the F91 Dudelange and with Jeunesse Esch he won multiple championships in Luxembourg.

On 5 and 12 July 2012, FCD03 won against NSÍ Runavík for the first round of qualifying for Europe League with 3–0 and 0–3, with a total of 6 goals in two games. In the second round, FC Differdange 03 faced Belgian club Gent, but were eliminated with an aggregate of 2–4.

On 18 July 2013, they defeated the Dutch club Utrecht in the first leg of 2nd qualifying round of the UEFA Europa League for 2–1. Omar Er Rafik scored both goals. And on 25 July 2013 the made a 3–3 draw against Utrecht in the return, eliminating the Dutch club, which is significantly larger than Differdange, in the UEFA Europa League.

Differdange 03 made history in the 2023–24 season as they won their seventh title in the Luxembourg National Division. This marked their first-ever top-flight title as "Differdange 03", securing it by winning at Stade Jos Haupert.

In 2024–25, Differdange 03 achieved their domestic double, winning both the BGL Ligue (Luxembourg National Division) and the Luxembourg Cup in the same season - their first since winning the double as Red Boys Differdange in 1979.

== Honours ==
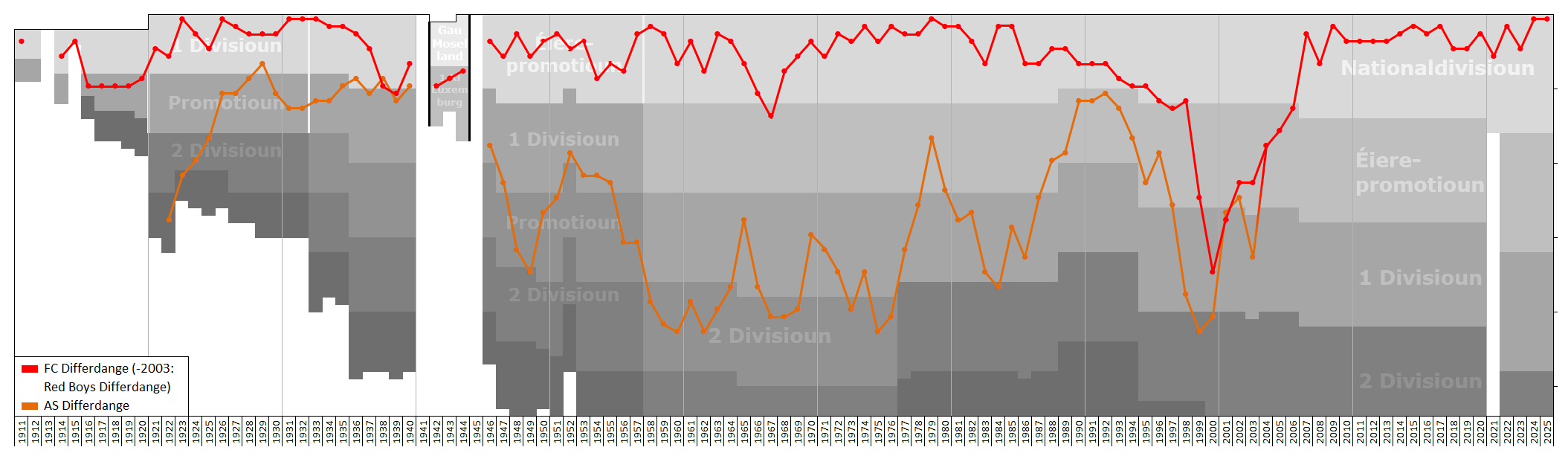
Historical league performance chart of FC Differdange 03

- National Division (8)
  - as SC Differdange
    - Runners-up (1): 1910–11
  - as Red Boys Differdange
    - Winners (6): 1922–23, 1925–26, 1930–31, 1931–32, 1932–33, 1978–79
    - Runners-up (10): 1926–27, 1933–34, 1934–35, 1957–58, 1973–74, 1975–76, 1979–80, 1980–81, 1983–84, 1984–85
  - as Differdange 03
    - Winners (2): 2023–24, 2024–25
    - Runners-up (5): 2008–09, 2014–15, 2016–17, 2021–22, 2025–26
- Luxembourg Cup (21)
  - as Red Boys Differdange
    - Winners (15): 1924–25, 1925–26, 1926–27, 1928–29, 1929–30, 1930–31, 1933–34, 1935–36, 1951–52, 1952–53, 1957–58, 1971–72, 1978–79, 1981–82, 1984–85
    - Runners-up (9): 1923–24, 1931–32, 1934–35, 1947–48, 1949–50, 1954–55, 1969–70, 1976–77, 1985–86
  - as AS Differdange
    - Runners-up (1): 1989–90
  - as Differdange 03
    - Winners (7): 2009–10, 2010–11, 2013–14, 2014–15, 2022–23, 2024–25, 2025–26
    - Runners-up (1): 2012–13

== European competition ==
As of 8 July 2026

Competition	P	W	D	L	F	A
Champions League	4	0	1	3	2	6
Europa League	31	10	4	17	31	49
UEFA Conference League	14	4	3	7	19	22
Intertoto Cup	2	0	0	2	0	5
Total	51	14	8	29	52	82

Season	Competition	Round	Opponent	1st Leg	2nd Leg	Agg	Notes
2007 Intertoto Cup		R1	(Slovakia) Slovan Bratislava	0–2 (H)	0–3 (A)	0–5	
2009–10 Europa League		Q2	(Croatia) Rijeka	1–0 (H)	0–3 (A)	1–3	
2010–11 Europa League		Q2	(Serbia) Spartak Zlatibor Voda	3–3 (H)	0–2 (A)	3–5	
2011–12 Europa League		Q2	(Estonia) Levadia Tallinn	0–0 (H)	1–0 (A)	1–0	
2011–12 Europa League		Q3	(Greece) Olympiakos Volou	0–3 (H)	0–3 (A)	w/o	(Note: Olympiacos Volos, who had reached the play-off round, were excluded from the competition by UEFA on 11 August 2011 for their involvement in the Koriopolis match-fixing scandal. UEFA decided to replace them in the play-off round with Differdange 03, who had lost to Olympiacos Volos in the previous round.)
2011–12 Europa League		PO	(France) Paris Saint-Germain	0–4 (H)	0–2 (A)	0–6	
2012–13 Europa League		Q1	(Faroe Islands) NSÍ Runavík	3–0 (H)	3–0 (A)	6–0	
2012–13 Europa League		Q2	(Belgium) Gent	0–1 (H)	2–3 (A)	2–4	
2013–14 Europa League		Q1	(Albania) Laçi	1–0 (A)	2–1 (H)	3–1	
2013–14 Europa League		Q2	(Netherlands) Utrecht	2–1 (H)	3–3 (A)	5–4	
2013–14 Europa League		Q3	(Norway) Tromsø	0–1 (A)	1–0 (H)	1–1	(Note: Lost 3–4 on penalties)
2014–15 Europa League		Q1	(Lithuania) Atlantas	1–0 (H)	1–3 (A)}	2–3	
2015–16 Europa League		Q1	(Wales) Bala Town	3–1 (H)	1–2 (A)	4–3	
2015–16 Europa League		Q2	(Turkey) Trabzonspor	0–1 (A)	1–2 (H)	1–3	
2016–17 Europa League		Q1	(Northern Ireland) Cliftonville	1–1 (H)	0–2 (A)	1–3	
2017–18 Europa League		Q1	(Azerbaijan) Zira	0–2 (A)	1–2 (H)	1–4	
2020–21 Europa League		Q1	(Bosnia and Herzegovina) Zrinjski Mostar	0–3 (A)	(Note: Played only one leg due to COVID-19)	0–3	
2022–23 Conference League		Q1	(Slovenia) Olimpija Ljubljana	1–1 (A)	1–2 (H)	2–3	
2023–24 Conference League		Q2	(Slovenia) Maribor	1–1 (H)	3–4 (A)	4–5	
2024–25	Champions League	Q1	(Faroe Islands) KÍ	0–2 (A)	0–0 (H)	0–2	
2024–25	Conference League	Q2	(Kazakhstan) Ordabasy	1–0 (H)	3–4 (A)	4–4	
2025–26	Champions League	Q1	(Kosovo) Drita	0–1 (A)	2–3 (H)	2–4	
2025–26	Conference League	Q2	(Wales) The New Saints	1–0 (A)	1–0 (H)	2–0	
2025–26	Conference League	Q3	(Estonia) Levadia Tallinn	2–3 (H)	3–1 (A)	5–4	(Note: Decided by playing extra time in the 2nd leg)
2025–26	Conference League	PO	(Kosovo) Drita	1–2 (A)	0–1 (H)	1–3	
2026–27 Conference League		Q1	(Finland) Ilves	0–0 (H)	1–3 (A)	1–3	

== Current squad ==
Updated 15 September 2026.

Note: Flags indicate national team as defined under FIFA eligibility rules; some limited exceptions apply. Players may hold more than one non-FIFA nationality.

No.	Pos.	Nation	Player
1	GK	BRA	Felipe
3	DF	FRA	Yrlès Kurzawa
4	DF	LUX	Kevin D'Anzico
7	FW	CMR	Boris Mfoumou
8	MF	POR	Bruninho
9	FW	GER	Andreas Buch
10	MF	LUX	Artur Abreu
14	DF	ARG	Juan Bedouret
16	DF	POR	Marco Grilo
17	MF	LUX	Marceu Delgado
20	MF	POR	Rafa Pinto
21	MF	FRA	Ludovic Rauch
24	FW	NGR	Jude Sunday

No.	Pos.	Nation	Player
25	DF	FRA	Geoffrey Franzoni
26	DF	ESP	Fonseca Mendes
27	FW	FRA	Corentin Jean
30	GK	LUX	Raphaël Correia
31	MF	LUX	Sébastien Thill
42	DF	RSA	Mhleli Mabuza
56	MF	LUX	Tomas Barros
66	DF	GBS	João Ricciulli
77	MF	BRA	Leandro Borges
80	FW	NGR	Elijah Benedict
88	DF	POR	Simão Melhôr
99	GK	FRA	Hugo Wolf
-	DF	BRA	Tomazi

=== Out on loan ===
Note: Flags indicate national team as defined under FIFA eligibility rules; some limited exceptions apply. Players may hold more than one non-FIFA nationality.

No.	Pos.	Nation	Player

=== Staff ===
- Head coach: (Portugal) Pedro Resende
- Assistant coach: (Portugal) José Leiras
- Goalkeeper coach: (Portugal) Ruben Araújo
- Fitness trainer: (France) Romain Katchavenda

== Former coaches ==
- (Luxembourg) Dan Theis (20 Nov 2003 – 30 June 2006)
- (Luxembourg) Roland Schaack (1 July 2008 – 30 June 2009)
- (Luxembourg) Dan Theis (1 July 2009 – 10 April 2011)
- (Luxembourg) Maurice Spitoni (caretaker) (10 April 2011 – 30 June 2011)
- (Luxembourg) Paolo Amodio (1 July 2011 – 30 June 2012)
- (France) Michel Le Flochmoan (1 July 2012 – 30 June 2014)
- (Luxembourg) Marc Thomé (1 July 2014 – 30 June 2016)
- (France) Pascal Carzaniga (1 July 2016 – 2019)
