= 2015–16 Luxembourg National Division =

Luxembourg National Division
- Season: 2015–16
- Champions: F91 Dudelange
- Relegated: Grevenmacher; Etzella Ettelbruck; Wiltz
- Champions League: F91 Dudelange
- Europa League: Fola Esch; Differdange 03
- Matches: 182
- Goals: 607 (3.34 per match)

The 2015–16 Luxembourg National Division was the 102nd season of top-tier football in Luxembourg. The league season started on 2 August 2015 and ended on 22 May 2016, with a promotion/relegation playoff following on 27 May.

F91 Dudelange claimed the title on goal difference over defending champions Fola Esch.

== Teams ==
RM Hamm Benfica, the 2014-15 Division of Honour champion, and UNA Strassen, which won the promotion play-off, were promoted to the top level for the first time in their history. Runner-up Racing FC rejoins the National Division just one year after their relegation.

Location of the 2015–16 Luxembourg National Division teams

Team	Venue	Capacity
Differdange 03	Stade Municipal de la Ville de Differdange	3,000
Differdange 03	Stade du Thillenberg	6,300
Etzella Ettelbruck	Stade Am Deich	2,102
F91 Dudelange	Stade Jos Nosbaum	2,558
Fola Esch	Stade Émile Mayrisch	3,826
Grevenmacher	Op Flohr Stadion	4,000
Jeunesse Esch	Stade de la Frontière	5,090
Mondorf-les-Bains	Stade John Grün	3,600
Progrès Niederkorn	Stade Jos Haupert	2,800
Racing FC	Stade Achille Hammerel	5,814
Racing FC	Stade Camille Polfer	2,740
Racing FC	Hollerich Stadion	2,120
RM Hamm Benfica	Luxembourg-Cents	2,800
Rumelange	Stade Municipal	2,950
UNA Strassen	Complexe Sportif Jean Wirtz	2,000
Victoria Rosport	VictoriArena	1,000
Wiltz	Stade Géitz	2,000

Source: World Stadiums

== League table ==
Pos	Team	Pld	W	D	L	GF	GA	GD	Pts	Qualification or relegation
1	F91 Dudelange (C)	26	19	5	2	65	21	+44	62	Qualification for the Champions League second qualifying round (Note: Since the winners of the 2015–16 Luxembourg Cup, F91 Dudelange, qualified for European competition based on league position, the spot awarded to the cup winners (Europa League first qualifying round) was passed to the fourth-placed team.)
2	Fola Esch	26	19	5	2	61	23	+38	62	Qualification for the Europa League first qualifying round
3	Differdange 03	26	17	4	5	63	32	+31	55	Qualification for the Europa League first qualifying round
4	Jeunesse Esch	26	13	7	6	48	30	+18	46	Qualification for the Europa League first qualifying round
5	UNA Strassen	26	11	5	10	50	50	0	38	
6	Progrès Niederkorn	26	10	6	10	41	30	+11	36	
7	Mondorf-les-Bains	26	10	6	10	36	34	+2	36	
8	Racing FC	26	10	5	11	45	54	−9	35	
9	RM Hamm Benfica	26	9	7	10	52	49	+3	34	
10	Rumelange	26	8	4	14	38	52	−14	28	
11	Victoria Rosport	26	7	5	14	46	49	−3	26	
12	Wiltz (R)	26	5	6	15	22	60	−38	21	Qualification for the relegation play-offs
13	Etzella Ettelbruck (R)	26	4	5	17	25	70	−45	17	Relegation to the Luxembourg Division of Honour
14	Grevenmacher (R)	26	3	4	19	15	53	−38	13	Relegation to the Luxembourg Division of Honour

Source: UEFA, Soccerway
Rules for classification: 1) Points; 2) Goal difference; 3) Matches won; 4) Head-to-head points; 5) Head-to-head goal difference; 6) Head-to-head goals scored; 7) Play-off.
(C) Champions; (R) Relegated

== Results ==
Home \ Away	DIF	ETZ	DUD	FOL	GRE	JEU	MON	PRO	RAC	RMH	RUM	UNA	VIC	WIL
Differdange 03		2–1	2–2	0–3	4–0	3–0	1–0	1–0	6–0	4–1	3–0	2–0	2–1	5–0
Etzella Ettelbruck	2–3		0–5	0–4	2–2	0–1	2–1	0–2	2–4	0–4	1–0	2–6	1–5	1–1
F91 Dudelange	0–1	6–0		2–0	2–0	1–0	3–0	2–1	4–2	2–1	4–3	1–0	7–1	1–1
Fola Esch	4–2	3–1	3–1		3–0	4–1	2–1	1–1	1–0	3–1	3–1	3–1	2–0	5–0
Grevenmacher	0–5	0–2	0–1	0–2		0–2	0–0	0–0	0–3	0–1	1–1	3–0	0–2	0–2
Jeunesse Esch	1–1	6–0	1–2	1–1	1–0		0–2	0–0	5–0	6–4	1–0	4–3	1–1	2–0
Mondorf-les-Bains	2–2	1–1	0–0	0–0	5–1	1–2		2–1	1–3	2–1	0–3	1–1	3–2	4–2
Progrès Niederkorn	0–1	4–0	0–3	0–1	1–2	0–2	0–1		2–1	2–0	2–0	4–2	2–1	4–1
Racing FC	1–1	2–1	0–2	2–2	2–1	0–0	2–1	2–2		1–4	2–3	1–2	0–4	4–0
RM Hamm Benfica	4–2	2–2	0–0	2–3	3–0	2–2	3–1	2–2	3–3		1–4	4–0	2–3	0–0
Rumelange	4–1	1–0	2–4	1–3	2–1	1–1	0–2	0–4	2–4	2–5		1–2	1–1	1–1
UNA Strassen	1–4	2–0	2–2	4–2	4–1	2–1	2–1	1–1	1–2	0–0	5–3		4–3	3–1
Victoria Rosport	2–3	1–2	1–2	1–1	0–1	1–2	0–3	1–4	4–2	5–1	0–1	2–2		0–0
Wiltz	3–2	2–2	0–6	0–2	3–2	1–5	0–1	3–2	0–2	0–1	0–1	1–0	0–4	

Source: Soccerway
Legend: Blue = home team win; Yellow = draw; Red = away team win.

== Relegation play-offs ==
A match was played between Wiltz, the twelfth-placed team in the 2015–16 Luxembourg National Division and Jeunesse Canach, the third-placed team in the 2015–16 Luxembourg Division of Honour. The winners, Jeunesse Canach, earned a place in the 2016–17 Luxembourg National Division.

27 May 2016
19:30 CEST

Wiltz	0–1 (a.e.t.)	Jeunesse Canach
	Report	Maurer 120'

Stade rue Henri Dunant, Luxembourg City
Attendance: 1,282

== Top goalscorers ==
As of 15 April 2016

Rank	Player	Club	Goals
1	(France) Julien Jahier	Racing FC	25
2	(Senegal) Momar N'Diaye	Jeunesse Esch	24
3	(Luxembourg) David Turpel	F91 Dudelange	20
4	(Morocco) Omar Er Rafik	Differdange 03	18
4	(Luxembourg) Stefano Bensi	Fola Esch	18
6	(France) Mickaël Jager	UNA Strassen	17
7	(Luxembourg) Jeff Lascak	Victoria Rosport	14
8	(Morocco) Samir Hadji	Fola Esch	13
8	(Germany) Patrick Stumpf	RM Hamm Benfica	13
10	(Bosnia and Herzegovina) Sanel Ibrahimović	F91 Dudelange	12

== See also ==
- 2015–16 Luxembourg Cup
