= Luxembourg football clubs in European competitions =

Luxembourg football clubs have participated in European football competitions since Spora Luxembourg took part in the 1956–57 European Cup. In total, 27 different clubs have represented Luxembourg in European competition. Of these, 18 are still in existence while the remaining 9 were merged into a new or existing team.

== Statistics ==
=== Competitors ===
Teams in bold are still competing in 2026–27 competitions, with teams in italic no longer active after dissolution or mergers. The Competition column uses the current name of the competition for ease of comparison.

As of 20 July 2026

Club	P	W	D	L	F	A	Competitions
Alliance Dudelange	4	0	2	2	4	18	All in Cup Winners' Cup
Aris Bonnevoie	22	3	3	16	16	72	3 Competitions: Competition / P / W / D / L / F / A; Champions League / 6 / 0 / 1 / 5 / 6 / 25; Europa League / 8 / 0 / 2 / 6 / 2 / 27; Cup Winners' Cup / 8 / 3 / 0 / 5 / 8 / 20
Atert Bissen	4	0	1	3	5	11	2 Competitions: Competition / P / W / D / L / F / A; Champions League / 2 / 0 / 0 / 2 / 2 / 4; Conference League / 2 / 0 / 1 / 1 / 3 / 7
Avenir Beggen	36	3	3	30	14	142	3 Competitions: Competition / P / W / D / L / F / A; Champions League / 12 / 0 / 0 / 12 / 1 / 56; Europa League / 12 / 2 / 1 / 9 / 6 / 44; Cup Winners' Cup / 12 / 1 / 2 / 9 / 7 / 42
CS Pétange	2	0	1	1	1	4	All in Europa League
Differdange 03	51	14	8	29	52	82	4 Competitions: Competition / P / W / D / L / F / A; Champions League / 4 / 0 / 1 / 3 / 2 / 6; Europa League / 31 / 10 / 4 / 17 / 31 / 49; Conference League / 14 / 4 / 3 / 7 / 19 / 22; Intertoto Cup / 2 / 0 / 0 / 2 / 0 / 5
F91 Dudelange	100	26	16	58	111	207	4 Competitions: Competition / P / W / D / L / F / A; Champions League / 42 / 10 / 7 / 25 / 49 / 78; Europa League / 40 / 11 / 8 / 21 / 43 / 80; Conference League / 14 / 5 / 1 / 8 / 16 / 30; Cup Winners' Cup / 4 / 0 / 0 / 4 / 3 / 19
Etzella Ettelbruck	16	0	3	13	7	46	2 Competitions: Competition / P / W / D / L / F / A; Europa League / 12 / 0 / 0 / 12 / 4 / 36; Intertoto Cup / 4 / 0 / 3 / 1 / 3 / 10
Fola Esch	36	7	7	22	31	78	4 Competitions: Competition / P / W / D / L / F / A; Champions League / 7 / 0 / 2 / 5 / 3 / 19; Europa League / 19 / 3 / 5 / 11 / 17 / 34; Conference League / 8 / 4 / 0 / 4 / 10 / 14; Cup Winners' Cup / 2 / 0 / 0 / 2 / 1 / 11
Grevenmacher	30	2	6	22	22	85	4 Competitions: Competition / P / W / D / L / F / A; Champions League / 2 / 0 / 1 / 1 / 0 / 2; Europa League / 20 / 1 / 3 / 16 / 14 / 58; Cup Winners' Cup / 4 / 1 / 0 / 3 / 5 / 12; Intertoto Cup / 4 / 0 / 2 / 2 / 3 / 13
Jeunesse Esch	83	10	10	63	61	247	3 Competitions: Competition / P / W / D / L / F / A; Champions League / 49 / 7 / 4 / 38 / 43 / 158; Europa League / 30 / 3 / 5 / 22 / 15 / 76; Cup Winners' Cup / 4 / 0 / 1 / 3 / 3 / 13
Jeunesse Hautcharage	2	0	0	2	0	21	All in Cup Winners' Cup
CS Hobscheid	6	0	2	4	3	13	All in Intertoto Cup
Mondercange	2	0	0	2	2	13	All in Europa League
Mondorf-les-Bains	2	0	1	1	2	3	All in Conference League
Progrès Niederkorn	36	9	5	22	26	69	4 Competitions: Competition / P / W / D / L / F / A; Champions League / 4 / 0 / 1 / 3 / 1 / 17; Europa League / 24 / 6 / 3 / 15 / 18 / 34; Conference League / 6 / 3 / 1 / 2 / 7 / 8; Cup Winners' Cup / 2 / 0 / 0 / 2 / 0 / 10
Racing Union	10	0	1	9	5	28	2 Competitions: Competition / P / W / D / L / F / A; Europa League / 4 / 0 / 1 / 3 / 1 / 12; Conference League / 6 / 0 / 0 / 6 / 4 / 16
Red Boys Differdange	20	1	1	18	8	103	3 Competitions: Competition / P / W / D / L / F / A; Champions League / 2 / 1 / 0 / 1 / 3 / 7; Europa League / 12 / 0 / 1 / 11 / 3 / 68; Cup Winners' Cup / 6 / 0 / 0 / 6 / 2 / 28
Spora Luxembourg	33	2	0	31	17	160	3 Competitions: Competition / P / W / D / L / F / A; Champions League / 7 / 1 / 0 / 6 / 7 / 36; Europa League / 20 / 1 / 0 / 19 / 8 / 101; Cup Winners' Cup / 6 / 0 / 0 / 6 / 2 / 23
Stade Dudelange	4	0	0	4	1	32	All in Champions League
Swift Hesperange	10	2	3	5	9	18	3 Competitions: Competition / P / W / D / L / F / A; Champions League / 2 / 0 / 1 / 1 / 1 / 3; Conference League / 6 / 2 / 2 / 2 / 8 / 9; Cup Winners' Cup / 2 / 0 / 0 / 2 / 0 / 6
UNA Strassen	8	2	1	5	3	12	All in Conference League
Union Luxembourg	38	2	4	32	14	114	4 Competitions: Competition / P / W / D / L / F / A; Champions League / 10 / 0 / 0 / 10 / 3 / 43; Europa League / 2 / 0 / 0 / 2 / 0 / 2; Cup Winners' Cup / 20 / 2 / 2 / 16 / 9 / 56; Intertoto Cup / 6 / 0 / 2 / 4 / 2 / 13
Union Titus Pétange	1	0	0	1	0	2	All in Europa League
UN Käerjéng 97	8	1	1	6	5	19	All in Europa League
US Rumelange	8	1	0	7	3	48	2 Competitions: Competition / P / W / D / L / F / A; Europa League / 4 / 0 / 0 / 4 / 0 / 32; Cup Winners' Cup / 4 / 1 / 0 / 3 / 3 / 16
Victoria Rosport	2	0	0	2	2	5	All in Intertoto Cup
Total	569	85	79	404	423	1630	5 Competitions: Competition / P / W / D / L / F / A; Champions League / 154 / 19 / 18 / 116 / 122 / 486; Europa League / 247 / 38 / 35 / 174 / 170 / 673; Conference League / 64 / 20 / 10 / 34 / 71 / 117; Cup Winners' Cup / 80 / 8 / 7 / 65 / 47 / 295; Intertoto Cup / 24 / 0 / 9 / 15 / 13 / 59

=== Record by Country of Opposition ===
As of 30 July 2026

Country-by-country record
Country	P	W	D	L	F	A
Albania	6	4	1	1	6	4
Andorra	5	4	0	1	7	2
Armenia	5	2	0	3	8	11
Austria	10	1	0	6	7	47
Azerbaijan	10	2	2	6	10	15
Belarus	4	2	1	1	4	8
Belgium	20	0	2	18	9	57
Bosnia and Herzegovina	5	1	1	3	4	6
Bulgaria	8	0	2	6	3	27
Croatia	14	1	2	11	6	39
Cyprus	12	2	0	10	9	29
Czech Republic	6	1	1	4	3	20
Denmark	12	3	1	8	11	48
East Germany	8	0	1	7	4	24
England	10	0	1	9	4	59
Estonia	6	4	1	1	10	5
Faroe Islands	6	3	2	3	10	7
Finland	20	5	5	10	18	31
France	16	0	0	16	4	76
Georgia	9	0	4	5	9	17
Germany	4	0	0	4	2	19
Gibraltar	3	0	1	2	2	9
Greece	12	1	0	11	5	39
Hungary	12	1	2	1	13	41
Iceland	10	1	2	7	12	27
Israel	4	0	0	4	2	14
Italy	14	0	0	14	4	58
Kazakhstan	6	1	2	3	7	12
Kosovo	10	2	4	4	10	11
Latvia	10	1	0	9	4	32
Lithuania	6	1	0	5	3	12
Malta	6	2	2	2	7	8
Moldova	7	2	2	3	4	7
Montenegro	1	1	0	0	3	0
Netherlands	17	1	3	13	10	93
North Macedonia	10	2	3	5	8	15
Northern Ireland	12	4	3	5	16	29
Norway	10	3	0	7	6	18
Poland	14	2	2	10	15	34
Portugal	14	0	0	14	3	68
Republic of Ireland	18	5	2	11	19	34
Romania	12	2	2	8	9	33
Russia	6	0	3	3	5	17
San Marino	6	4	0	2	15	4
Scotland	11	2	1	8	5	29
Serbia	6	0	1	5	4	18
Serbia and Montenegro	2	0	1	1	1	4
Slovakia	10	0	1	9	8	29
Slovenia	16	0	3	13	9	32
Soviet Union	2	0	0	2	0	9
Spain	14	0	1	13	7	59
Sweden	37	3	7	27	20	114
Switzerland	16	1	2	13	2	40
Turkey	10	1	0	9	7	28
Wales	8	5	1	2	12	8
West Germany	11	1	0	10	7	54
Yugoslavia	10	1	1	8	10	53

== Active competitions ==
=== European Cup / Champions League ===
As of 15 July 2026

European Cup
Season	Team	Round	Opponent	1st Leg	2nd Leg	Agg	Playoff
1955–56	Not invited to participate						
1956–57	Spora Luxembourg	PR	(West Germany) Borussia Dortmund	3–4 (A)	2–1 (H)	5–5	0–7 (A)
1957–58	Stade Dudelange	PR	(Socialist Federal Republic of Yugoslavia) Red Star Belgrade	0–5 (H)	1–9 (A)	1–14	
1958–59	Jeunesse Esch	PR	(Sweden) IFK Göteborg	1–2 (A)	1–0 (H)	2–2	1–5 (A)
1959–60	Jeunesse Esch	PR	(Poland) ŁKS Łódź	5–0 (H)	1–2 (A)	6–2	
1959–60	Jeunesse Esch	R16	(Spain) Real Madrid	0–7 (A)	2–5 (H)	2–12	
1960–61	Jeunesse Esch	PR	(France) Stade Reims	1–6 (A)	0–5 (H)	1–11	
1961–62	Spora Luxembourg	PR	(Denmark) Boldklubben 1913	0–6 (H)	2–9 (A)	2–15	
1962–63	Union Luxembourg	PR	(Italy) Milan	0–8 (A)	0–6 (H)	0–14	
1963–64	Jeunesse Esch	PR	(Finland) Haka	1–4 (A)	4–0 (H)	5–4	
1963–64	Jeunesse Esch	R1	(Socialist Federal Republic of Yugoslavia) Partizan	2–1 (H)	2–6 (A)	4–7	
1964–65	Aris	PR	(Portugal) Benfica	1–5 (H)	1–5 (A)	2–10	
1965–66	Stade Dudelange	PR	(Portugal) Benfica	0–8 (H)	0–10 (A)	0–18	
1966–67	Aris	PR	(Northern Ireland) Linfield	3–3 (H)	1–6 (A)	4–9	
1967–68	Jeunesse Esch	R1	(Iceland) Valur	1–1 (H)	3–3 (A)	4–4	(Note: Decided by the away goals rule)
1968–69	Jeunesse Esch	R1	(Greece) AEK Athens	0–3 (A)	3–2 (A)	3–5	
1969–70	Avenir Beggen	R1	(Italy) Milan	0–5 (A)	0–3 (H)	0–8	
1970–71	Jeunesse Esch	R1	(Greece) Panathinaikos	1–2 (H)	0–5 (A)	1–7	
1971–72	Union Luxembourg	PR	(Spain) Valencia	1–3 (A)	0–1 (H)	1–4	
1972–73	Aris	R1	(Romania) Argeș Pitești	0–2 (H)	0–4 (A)	0–6	
1973–74	Jeunesse Esch	R1	(England) Liverpool	1–1 (H)	0–2 (A)	1–3	
1974–75	Jeunesse Esch	R1	(Turkey) Fenerbahçe	2–3 (H)	0–2 (A)	2–5	
1975–76	Jeunesse Esch	R1	(Germany) Bayern Munich	0–5 (H)	1–3 (A)	1–8	
1976–77	Jeunesse Esch	R1	(Hungary) Ferencváros	1–5 (A)	2–6 (H)	3–11	
1977–78	Jeunesse Esch	R1	(Scotland) Celtic	0–5 (A)	1–6 (H)	1–11	
1978–79	Progrès Niederkorn	R1	(Spain) Real Madrid	0–5 (A)	0–7 (H)	0–12	
1979–80	Red Boys Differdange	R1	(Cyprus) Omonia	2–1 (H)	1–6 (A)	3–7	
1980–81	Jeunesse Esch	R1	(Soviet Union) Spartak Moscow	0–5 (H)	0–4 (A)	0–9	
1981–82	Progrès Niederkorn	R1	(Northern Ireland) Glentoran	1–1 (H)	0–4 (A)	1–5	
1982–83	Avenir Beggen	R1	(Austria) Rapid Wien	0–5 (H)	0–8 (A)	0–13	
1983–84	Jeunesse Esch	R1	(East Germany) Dynamo Berlin	1–4 (A)	0–2 (H)	1–6	
1984–85	Avenir Beggen	R1	(Sweden) IFK Göteborg	0–8 (H)	0–9 (A)	0–17	
1985–86	Jeunesse Esch	R1	(Italy) Juventus	0–5 (H)	1–4 (A)	1–9	
1986–87	Avenir Beggen	R1	Austria Wien	0–3 (H)	0–3 (A)	0–6	
1987–88	Jeunesse Esch	R1	(Denmark) AGF Aarhus	1–4 (A)	1–0 (H)	2–4	
1988–89	Jeunesse Esch	R1	(Poland) Górnik Zabrze	0–3 (A)	1–4 (H)	1–7	
1989–90	Spora Luxembourg	R1	(Spain) Real Madrid	0–3 (H)	0–6 (A)	0–9	
1990–91	Union Luxembourg	R1	(East Germany) Dynamo Dresden	1–3 (H)	0–3 (H)	1–6	
1991–92	Union Luxembourg	R1	(France) Marseille	0–5 (H)	0–5 (H)	0–10	

Champions League
Season	Team	Round	Opponent	1st Leg	2nd Leg	Agg	Playoff
1992–93	Union Luxembourg	R1	(Portugal) Porto	1–4 (H)	0–5 (A)	1–9	
1993–94	Avenir Beggen	PR	(Norway) Rosenborg	0–2 (H)	0–1 (A)	0–3	
1994–95	Avenir Beggen	QR	(Turkey) Galatasaray	1–5 (H)	0–4 (A)	1–9	
1995–96	Did not participate						
1996–97	Did not participate						
1997–98	Jeunesse Esch	Q1	(Switzerland) Sion	0–4 (A)	0–1 (H)	0–5	
1998–99	Jeunesse Esch	Q1	(Switzerland) Grasshopper	0–6 (A)	0–2 (H)	0–8	
1999–00	Jeunesse Esch	Q1	(Latvia) Skonto	0–2 (H)	0–8 (A)	0–10	
2000–01	F91 Dudelange	Q1	(Bulgaria) Levski Sofia	0–4 (H)	0–2 (A)	0–6	
2001–02	F91 Dudelange	Q1	(Latvia) Skonto	1–6 (H)	1–0 (A)	2–6	
2002–03	F91 Dudelange	Q1	(North Macedonia) Vardar	1–1 (H)	0–3 (A)	1–4	
2003–04	Grevenmacher	Q1	(Bosnia and Herzegovina) Leotar	0–0 (H)	0–2 (A)	0–2	
2004–05	Jeunesse Esch	Q1	(Moldova) Sheriff Tiraspol	0–2 (A)	1–0 (H)	1–2	
2005–06	F91 Dudelange	Q1	(Bosnia and Herzegovina) Zrinjski Mostar	0–1 (H)	4–0 (A)	4–1	(Note: Decided by playing extra time in the 2nd leg)
2005–06	F91 Dudelange	Q2	(Austria) Rapid Wien	1–6 (H)	2–3 (A)	3–9	
2006–07	F91 Dudelange	Q1	(North Macedonia) Rabotnički	0–1 (H)	0–0 (A)	0–1	
2007–08	F91 Dudelange	Q1	(Slovakia) Žilina	1–2 (H)	4–5 (A)	5–7	
2008–09	F91 Dudelange	Q1	(Slovenia) Domžale	0–1 (H)	0–2 (A)	0–3	
2009–10	F91 Dudelange	Q1	(Latvia) Ventspils	0–3 (A)	1–3 (H)	1–6	
2010–11	Jeunesse Esch	Q2	(Sweden) AIK	0–0 (A)	0–1 (H)	0–1	
2011–12	F91 Dudelange	Q1	(Andorra) FC Santa Coloma	2–0 (A)	2–0 (H)	4–0	
2011–12	F91 Dudelange	Q2	(Slovenia) Maribor	0–2 (A)	1–3 (H)	1–5	
2012–13	F91 Dudelange	Q1	(San Marino) Tre Penne	7–0 (H)	4–0 (A)	11–0	
2012–13	F91 Dudelange	Q2	(Austria) Red Bull Salzburg	1–0 (H)	3–4 (A)	4–4	
2012–13	F91 Dudelange	Q3	(Slovenia) Maribor	1–4 (A)	0–1 (H)	1–5	(Note: Transferred to the Europa League)
2013–14	Fola Esch	Q2	(Croatia) Dinamo Zagreb	0–5 (H)	0–1 (A)	0–6	
2014–15	F91 Dudelange	Q2	(Bulgaria) Ludogorets Razgrad	0–4 (A)	1–1 (H)	1–5	
2015–16	Fola Esch	Q2	(Croatia) Dinamo Zagreb	1–1 (A)	0–3 (H)	1–4	
2016–17	F91 Dudelange	Q2	(Azerbaijan) Qarabağ	0–2 (A)	1–1 (H)	1–3	
2017–18	F91 Dudelange	Q2	(Cyprus) APOEL	0–1 (A)	0–1 (H)	0–2	
2018–19	F91 Dudelange	Q1	(Hungary) MOL Vidi	1–1 (H)	1–2 (A)	2–3	
2019–20	F91 Dudelange	Q1	(Malta) Valletta	2–2 (H)	1–1 (A)	3–3	
2020–21	Fola Esch	Q1	(Moldova) Sheriff Tiraspol	0–2 (A)	(Note: Played only one leg due to COVID-19)	0–2	
2021–22	Fola Esch	Q1	(Gibraltar) Lincoln Red Imps	2–2 (H)	0–5 (A)	2–7	(Note: Transferred to the Conference League)
2022–23	F91 Dudelange	Q1	(Albania) Tirana	1–0 (H)	2–1 (A)	3–1	
2022–23	F91 Dudelange	Q2	(Armenia) Pyunik	1–0 (A)	1–4 (H)	2–4	
2023–24	Swift Hesperange	Q1	(Slovakia) Slovan Bratislava	1–1 (A)	0–2 (H)	1–3	
2024–25	Differdange 03	Q1	(Faroe Islands) KÍ	0–2 (A)	0–0 (H)	0–2	
2025–26	Differdange 03	Q1	(Kosovo) Drita	0–1 (A)	2–3 (H)	2–4	
2026–27	Atert Bissen	Q1	(Faroe Islands) KÍ	1–2 (A)	1–2 (H)	2–4	

PR = Preliminary round; QR = Qualifying round; R1/R2 = First/Second round; Q1/Q2/Q3 = First/Second/Third qualifying round; R16 = Round of 16

=== Inter-Cities Fairs Cup / UEFA Cup / Europa League ===
As of 15 June 2026

Inter-Cities Fairs Cup
Season	Team	Round	Opponent	1st Leg	2nd Leg	Agg	Playoff
1955–58	Did not participate						
1958–60	Did not participate						
1960–61	Did not participate						
1961–62	Did not participate						
1962–63	Aris	R1	(Italy) Sampdoria	0–1 (A)	0–2 (H)	0–3	
1963–64	Aris	R1	(Belgium) RFC Liegeois	0–2 (H)	0–0 (A)	0–2	
1964–65	Spora Luxembourg	R1	(Switzerland) Basel	0–2 (A)	1–0 (H)	1–2	
1965–66	Union Luxembourg	R1	(West Germany) 1. FC Köln	0–4 (H)	0–13 (A)	0–17	
1966–67	Union Luxembourg	R1	(Belgium) R. Antwerp F.C.	0–1 (H)	0–1 (A)	0–2	
1967–68	Spora Luxembourg	R1	(England) Leeds United	0–9 (H)	0–7 (A)	0–16	
1968–69	Union Luxembourg	R1	(Hungary) Újpest FC	Walkover			
1969–70	Jeunesse Esch	R1	(Northern Ireland) Coleraine	3–2 (H)	0–4 (A)	3–6	
1970–71	US Rumelange	R1	(Italy) Juventus	0–7 (A)	0–4 (A)	0–11	

UEFA Cup
Season	Team	Round	Opponent	1st Leg	2nd Leg	Agg	Playoff
1971–72	Aris	R1	(Netherlands) Den Haag	0–5 (A)	2–2 (H)	2–7	
1972–73	US Rumelange	R1	(Netherlands) Feyenoord Rotterdam	0–9 (A)	0–12 (H)	0–21	
1973–74	Union Luxembourg	R1	(France) Olympique Marseille	0–5 (H)	1–7 (A)	1–12	
1974–75	Red Boys Differdange	R1	(France) Lyon	0–7 (A)	1–4 (H)	1–11	
1975–76	Avenir Beggen	R1	(Portugal) Porto	0–7 (A)	0–3 (H)	0–10	
1976–77	Red Boys Differdange	R1	(Belgium) SC Lokeren	0–3 (H)	1–3 (A)	1–6	
1977–78	Red Boys Differdange	R1	(Netherlands) AZ Alkmaar	1–11 (A)	0–5 (H)	1–16	
1978–79	Jeunesse Esch	R1	(Switzerland) Lausanne Sports	0–0 (H)	0–2 (A)	0–2	
1979–80	Progrès Niederkorn	R1	(Switzerland) Grasshopper	0–2 (H)	0–4 (A)	0–6	
1980–81	Red Boys Differdange	R1	(Netherlands) AZ	0–6 (A)	0–4 (H)	0–10	
1981–82	Red Boys Differdange	R1	Sporting Clube de Portugal	0–4 (A)	0–7 (H)	0–11	
1982–83	Progrès Niederkorn	R1	(Switzerland) Servette	0–1 (H)	0–3 (A)	0–4	
1983–84	Aris	R1	Austria Wien	0–5 (H)	0–10 (A)	0–15	
1984–85	Red Boys Differdange	R1	(Netherlands) Ajax	0–0 (H)	0–14 (A)	0–14	
1985–86	Avenir Beggen	R1	(Netherlands) PSV Eindhoven	0–2 (H)	0–4 (A)	0–6	
1986–87	Jeunesse Esch	R1	(Belgium) K.A.A. Gent	1–2 (H)	1–1 (A)	2–3	
1987–88	Spora Luxembourg	R1	(Netherlands) Feyenoord	0–5 (A)	2–5 (H)	2–10	
1988–89	Union Luxembourg	R1	(Belgium) Liège	1–7 (H)	0–4 (A)	1–11	
1989–90	Jeunesse Esch	R1	(France) Sochaux	0–7 (A)	0–5 (H)	0–12	
1990–91	Avenir Beggen	R1	(Czech Republic) FK Inter Bratislava	2–1 (H)	0–5 (A)	2–6	
1991–92	Spora Luxembourg	R1	(Germany) Eintracht Frankfurt	1–6 (A)	0–5 (H)	1–11	
1992–93	Spora Luxembourg	R1	(England) Sheffield Wednesday	1–8 (A)	1–2 (H)	2–10	
1993–94	Union Luxembourg	R1	(Portugal) Boavista	0–1 (H)	0–4 (A)	0–5	
1994–95	Grevenmacher	PR	(Norway) Rosenborg	1–2 (H)	0–6 (A)	1–8	
1995–96	Jeunesse Esch	PR	(Switzerland) Lugano	0–0 (H)	0–4 (A)	0–4	
1995–96	Avenir Beggen	PR	(Sweden) Örebro SK	0–0 (A)	3–0 (A)	3–0	
1995–96	Avenir Beggen	R1	(France) Lens	0–6 (A)	0–7 (H)	0–13	
1996–97	Grevenmacher	PR	(Georgia (country)) Dinamo Tbilisi	0–4 (A)	2–2 (H)	2–6	
1996–97	Jeunesse Esch	PR	(Poland) Legia Warsaw	2–4 (H)	0–3 (A)	2–7	
1997–98	Grevenmacher	Q1	(Croatia) Hajduk Split	1–4 (H)	0–2 (A)	1–6	
1998–99	Union Luxembourg	Q1	(Sweden) IFK Göteborg	0–3 (H)	0–4 (A)	0–7	
1999–00	FC Mondercange	QR	(Romania) Dinamo București	2–6 (H)	0–7 (A)	2–13	
1999–00	F91 Dudelange	QR	(Croatia) Hajduk Split	0–5 (A)	1–1 (H)	1–6	
2000–01	Jeunesse Esch	QR	(Scotland) Celtic	0–4 (H)	0–7 (A)	0–11	
2000–01	Grevenmacher	QR	(Finland) HJK Helsinki	1–4 (A)	2–0 (H)	3–4	
2001–02	Etzella Ettelbruck	QR	(Poland) Legia Warszawa	0–4 (H)	1–2 (A)	1–6	
2001–02	Grevenmacher	QR	(Greece) AEK Athens	0–6 (A)	0–2 (H)	0–5	
2002–03	Grevenmacher	QR	(Cyprus) Anorthosis Famagusta	0–3 (A)	0–2 (A)	0–5	
2002–03	Avenir Beggen	QR	(England) Ipswich Town	0–1 (H)	1–8 (A)	1–9	
2003–04	Etzella Ettelbruck	QR	(Croatia) Kamen Ingrad	1–2 (H)	0–7 (A)	1–9	
2003–04	F91 Dudelange	QR	(Slovakia) Artmedia Petržalka	0–1 (A)	0–1 (H)	0–2	
2004–05	F91 Dudelange	Q1	(Lithuania) Ekranas	0–1 (A)	1–2 (H)	1–3	
2004–05	Etzella Ettelbruck	Q1	(Finland) Haka	1–2 (A)	1–3 (H)	2–5	
2005–06	CS Pétange	Q1	(Finland) AC Allianssi	0–3 (A)	1–1 (A)	1–4	
2005–06	Etzella Ettelbruck	Q1	(Iceland) Keflavík	0–4 (H)	0–2 (A)	0–6	
2006–07	Jeunesse Esch	Q1	(Latvia) Skonto	0–2 (H)	0–3 (A)	0–5	
2006–07	Etzella Ettelbruck	Q1	(Sweden) Åtvidaberg	0–4 (A)	0–3 (H)	0–7	
2007–08	Käerjéng 97	Q1	(Norway) Lillestrøm	1–2 (A)	1–0 (H)	2–2	
2007–08	Käerjéng 97	Q2	(Belgium) Standard Liège	0–3 (H)	0–1 (A)	0–4	
2007–08	Etzella Ettelbruck	Q1	(Finland) HJK	0–2 (A)	0–1 (H)	0–3	
2008–09	Grevenmacher	Q1	(Iceland) FH	2–3 (A)	1–5 (H)	3–8	
2008–09	Racing	Q1	(Sweden) Kalmar FF	0–3 (H)	1–7 (A)	1–10	

Europa League
Season	Team	Round	Opponent	1st Leg	2nd Leg	Agg	Playoff
2009–10	Grevenmacher	Q1	(Lithuania) Vėtra	0–3 (H)	0–3 (A)	0–6	
2009–10	Käerjéng 97	Q1	(Cyprus) Anorthosis Famagusta	0–5 (A)	1–2 (H)	1–7	
2009–10	Differdange 03	Q2	(Croatia) Rijeka	1–0 (H)	0–3 (A)	1–3	
2010–11	Grevenmacher	Q1	(Republic of Ireland) Dundalk	3–3 (H)	1–2 (A)	4–5	
2010–11	F91 Dudelange	Q1	(Denmark) Randers	1–6 (A)	2–1 (H)	3–7	
2010–11	Differdange 03	Q2	(Serbia) Spartak Zlatibor Voda	3–3 (H)	0–2 (A)	3–5	
2011–12	Fola Esch	Q1	(Sweden) Elfsborg	0–4 (A)	1–1 (H)	1–5	
2011–12	Käerjéng 97	Q1	(Sweden) Häcken	1–1 (H)	1–5 (A)	2–6	
2011–12	Differdange 03	Q2	(Estonia) Levadia Tallinn	0–0 (H)	1–0 (A)	1–0	
2011–12	Differdange 03	Q3	(Greece) Olympiacos Volos	0–3 (H)	0–3 (A)	w/o	(Note: Olympiacos Volos, who had reached the play-off round, were excluded from the competition by UEFA on 11 August 2011 for their involvement in the Koriopolis match-fixing scandal. UEFA decided to replace them in the play-off round with Differdange 03, who had lost to Olympiacos Volos in the previous round.)
2011–12	Differdange 03	PO	(France) Paris Saint-Germain	0–4 (H)	0–2 (A)	0–6	
2012–13	Grevenmacher	Q1	(Albania) Tirana	0–2 (A)	0–0 (H)	0–2	
2012–13	Differdange 03	Q1	(Faroe Islands) NSÍ Runavík	3–0 (H)	3–0 (A)	6–0	
2012–13	Differdange 03	Q2	(Belgium) Gent	0–1 (H)	2–3 (A)	2–4	
2012–13	Jeunesse Esch	Q1	(Slovenia) Olimpija Ljubljana	0–3 (A)	0–3 (H)	0–6	
2012–13	F91 Dudelange (Note: Transferred from the Champions League)	PO	(Israel) Hapoel Tel Aviv	1–3 (H)	0–4 (A)	1–7	
2013–14	F91 Dudelange	Q1	(Moldova) Milsami Orhei	0–1 (A)	0–0 (H)	0–1	
2013–14	Jeunesse Esch	Q1	(Finland) TPS	2–0 (H)	1–2 (A)	3–2	
2013–14	Jeunesse Esch	Q2	(Latvia) Ventspils	0–1 (A)	1–4 (H)	1–5	
2013–14	Differdange 03	Q1	(Albania) Laçi	1–0 (A)	2–1 (H)	3–1	
2013–14	Differdange 03	Q2	(Netherlands) Utrecht	2–1 (H)	3–3 (A)	5–4	
2013–14	Differdange 03	Q3	(Norway) Tromsø	0–1 (A)	1–0 (H)	1–1	(Note: Lost 3–4 on penalties)
2014–15	Differdange 03	Q1	(Lithuania) Atlantas	1–0 (H)	1–3 (A)	2–3	
2014–15	Jeunesse Esch	Q1	(Republic of Ireland) Dundalk	0–2 (H)	1–3 (A)	1–5	
2014–15	Fola Esch	Q1	(Sweden) IFK Göteborg	0–0 (A)	0–2 (H)	0–2	
2015–16	Differdange 03	Q1	(Wales) Bala Town	3–1 (H)	1–2 (A)	4–3	
2015–16	Differdange 03	Q2	(Turkey) Trabzonspor	0–1 (A)	1–2 (H)	1–3	
2015–16	Progrès Niederkorn	Q1	(Republic of Ireland) Shamrock Rovers	0–0 (H)	0–3 (A)	0–3	
2015–16	F91 Dudelange	Q1	(Republic of Ireland) UCD	0–1 (A)	2–1 (H)	2–2	
2016–17	Jeunesse Esch	Q1	(Republic of Ireland) St Patrick's Athletic	0–1 (A)	2–1 (H)	2–2	
2016–17	Fola Esch	Q1	(Scotland) Aberdeen	1–3 (A)	1–0 (H)	2–3	
2016–17	Differdange 03	Q1	(Northern Ireland) Cliftonville	1–1 (H)	0–2 (A)	1–3	
2017–18	Differdange 03	Q1	(Azerbaijan) Zira	0–2 (A)	1–2 (H)	1–4	
2017–18	Fola Esch	Q1	(Moldova) Milsami Orhei	2–1 (H)	1–1 (A)	3–2	
2017–18	Fola Esch	Q2	(Azerbaijan) Inter Baku	0–1 (A)	4–1 (H)	4–2	
2017–18	Fola Esch	Q3	(Sweden) Östersund	0–1 (A)	1–2 (H)	1–3	
2017–18	Progrès Niederkorn	Q1	(Scotland) Rangers	0–1 (A)	2–0 (H)	2–1	
2017–18	Progrès Niederkorn	Q2	(Cyprus) AEL Limassol	0–1 (H)	1–2 (A)	1–3	
2018–19	Fola Esch	Q1	(Kosovo) Prishtina	0–0 (H)	0–0 (A)	0–0	(Note: Won 5–4 on penalties)
2018–19	Fola Esch	Q2	(Belgium) Genk	0–5 (A)	1–4 (H)	1–9	
2018–19	Progrès Niederkorn	Q1	(Azerbaijan) Gabala	2–0 (A)	0–1 (A)	2–1	
2018–19	Progrès Niederkorn	Q2	(Hungary) Honvéd	0–1 (A)	2–0 (H)	2–1	
2018–19	Progrès Niederkorn	Q3	(Russia) Ufa	1–2 (A)	2–2 (H)	3–4	
2018–19	Racing	Q1	(Romania) Viitorul Constanța	0–2 (H)	0–0 (A)	0–2	
2018–19	F91 Dudelange	Q2	(Kosovo) Drita	2–1 (H)	1–1 (A)	3–1	
2018–19	F91 Dudelange	Q3	(Poland) Legia Warsaw	2–1 (A)	2–2 (H)	4–3	
2018–19	F91 Dudelange	PO	(Romania) CFR Cluj	2–0 (H)	3–2 (A)	5–2	
2018–19	F91 Dudelange	Grp F	(Italy) AC Milan	0–1 (H)			4th
2018–19	F91 Dudelange	Grp F	(Spain) Real Betis	0–3 (A)			4th
2018–19	F91 Dudelange	Grp F	(Greece) Olympiacos	0–2 (H)			4th
2018–19	F91 Dudelange	Grp F	(Greece) Olympiacos	1–5 (A)			4th
2018–19	F91 Dudelange	Grp F	(Italy) AC Milan	2–5 (A)			4th
2018–19	F91 Dudelange	Grp F	(Spain) Real Betis	0–0 (H)			4th
2019–20	Progrès Niederkorn	PR	(Wales) Cardiff Metropolitan University	1–0 (H)	1–2 (A)	2–2	
2019–20	Progrès Niederkorn	Q1	(Republic of Ireland) Cork City	2–0 (H)	1–2 (H)	3–2	
2019–20	Progrès Niederkorn	Q2	(Scotland) Rangers	0–2 (A)	0–0 (H)	0–2	
2019–20	Fola Esch	Q1	(Georgia (country)) Chikhura Sachkhere	1–2 (H)	1–2 (A)	2–4	
2019–20	Jeunesse Esch	Q1	(Kazakhstan) Tobol	0–0 (H)	1–1 (A)	2–2	
2019–20	Jeunesse Esch	Q2	(Portugal) Vitória de Guimarães	0–1 (H)	0–4 (A)	0–5	
2019–20	F91 Dudelange	Q2	(North Macedonia) Shkëndija	2–1 (A)	1–1 (H)	3–2	
2019–20	F91 Dudelange	Q3	(Estonia) Nõmme Kalju	3–1 (H)	1–0 (A)	4–1	
2019–20	F91 Dudelange	PO	Ararat-Armenia	2–1 (A)	1–2 (H)	3–3	
2019–20	F91 Dudelange	Grp A	(Cyprus) APOEL	4–3 (A)			4th
2019–20	F91 Dudelange	Grp A	(Azerbaijan) Qarabağ	1–4 (H)			4th
2019–20	F91 Dudelange	Grp A	(Spain) Sevilla	0–3 (A)			4th
2019–20	F91 Dudelange	Grp A	(Spain) Sevilla	2–5 (H)			4th
2019–20	F91 Dudelange	Grp A	(Cyprus) APOEL	0–2 (H)			4th
2019–20	F91 Dudelange	Grp A	(Azerbaijan) Qarabağ	1–1 (A)			4th
2020–21	Differdange 03	Q1	(Bosnia and Herzegovina) Zrinjski Mostar	0–3 (A)		0–3	
2020–21	Union Titus Pétange	Q1	(Gibraltar) Lincoln Red Imps	0–2 (A)		0–2	
2020–21	Progrès Niederkorn	Q1	(Montenegro) Zeta	3–0 (H)		3–0	
2020–21	Progrès Niederkorn	Q2	(Netherlands) Willem II	0–5 (H)		0–5	
2020–21	Fola Esch	Q2	Ararat-Armenia	3–4 (A)		3–4	
2021–22	Did not participate						
2022–23	F91 Dudelange	Q3	(Sweden) Malmö FF	0–3 (A)	2–2 (H)	2–5	
2023–24	Did not participate						
2024–25	Did not participate						
2025–26	Did not participate						
2026–27	Did not participate						

PR = Preliminary round; QR = Qualifying round; R1/R2 = First/Second round; Q1/Q2/Q3 = First/Second/Third qualifying round; PO: Play-off Round; Grp: Group Stage

=== Europa Conference League ===
As of 30 July 2026

Conference League
Season	Team	Round	Opponent	1st Leg	2nd Leg	Agg	Playoff
2021–22	Swift Hesperange	Q1	(Slovenia) Domžale	0–1 (A)	1–1 (H)	1–2	
2021–22	Racing FC	Q1	(Iceland) Breiðablik	2–3 (H)	0–2 (A)	2–5	
2021–22	Fola Esch	Q2	(Belarus) Shakhtyor Soligorsk	2–1 (A)	1–0 (H)	3–1	
2021–22	Fola Esch	Q3	(Northern Ireland) Linfield	2–1 (A)	2–1 (H)	4–1	
2021–22	Fola Esch	PO	(Kazakhstan) Kairat	1–4 (H)	1–3 (A)	2–7	
2021–22	F91 Dudelange	Q2	(Republic of Ireland) Bohemian	0–1 (H)	0–3 (A)	0–4	
2022–23	Differdange 03	Q1	(Slovenia) Olimpija Ljubljana	1–1 (A)	1–2 (H)	2–3	
2022–23	Fola Esch	Q1	(San Marino) Tre Fiori	0–1 (H)	1–3 (A)	1–4	
2022–23	Racing FC	Q2	(Serbia) Čukarički	1–4 (H)	0–4 (A)	1–8	
2022–23	F91 Dudelange (Note: Transferred from the Europa League)	PO	(Poland) Lech Poznań	0–2 (A)	1–1 (H)	1–3	
2023–24	F91 Dudelange	Q1	(Republic of Ireland) St Patrick's Athletic	2–1 (H)	3–2 (A)	5–3	
2023–24	F91 Dudelange	Q2	(Malta) Gżira United	0–2 (A)	2–1 (H)	2–3	
2023–24	Progrès Niederkorn	Q1	(Kosovo) Gjilani	2–2 (H)	2–0 (A)	4–2	
2023–24	Progrès Niederkorn	Q2	(Denmark) Midtjylland	0–2 (A)	2–1 (H)	2–3	
2023–24	Differdange 03	Q2	(Slovenia) Maribor	1–1 (H)	3–4 (A)	4–5	
2023–24	Swift Hesperange	Q2	(Wales) The New Saints	1–1 (A)	3–2 (H)	4–3	
2023–24	Swift Hesperange	Q3	(North Macedonia) Struga	1–3 (A)	2–1 (H)	3–4	
2024–25	F91 Dudelange	Q1	(Andorra) Atlètic Club d'Escaldes	1–0 (A)	2–0 (H)	3–0	
2024–25	F91 Dudelange	Q2	(Sweden) BK Häcken	2–6 (H)	1–6 (A)	3–12	
2024–25	UNA Strassen	Q1	(Finland) KuPS	0–0 (H)	0–5 (A)	0–5	
2024–25	Differdange 03	Q2	(Kazakhstan) Ordabasy	1–0 (H)	3–4 (A)	4–4	
2024–25	Progrès Niederkorn	Q2	(Sweden) Djurgårdens IF	0–3 (H)	1–0 (H)	1–3	
2025–26	F91 Dudelange	Q1	(Andorra) Atlètic Club d'Escaldes	0–2 (A)	2–3 (H)	2–5	
2025–26	Racing Union	Q1	(Georgia (country)) Dila Gori	1–2 (H)	0–1 (A)	1–3	
2025–26	UNA Strassen	Q2	(Scotland) Dundee United	0–1 (A)	0–1 (H)	0–2	
2025–26	Differdange 03	Q2	(Wales) The New Saints	1–0 (A)	1–0 (H)	2–0	
2025–26	Differdange 03	Q3	(Estonia) FCI Levadia	2–3 (H)	1–3 (A)	5–4	
2025–26	Differdange 03	PO	(Kosovo) Drita	1–2 (A)	0–1 (H)	1–3	
2026–27	Differdange 03	Q1	(Finland) Ilves	0–0 (H)	1–3 (A)	1–3	
2026–27	Mondorf-les-Bains	Q1	(Georgia (country)) Dimano Tbilisi	1–2 (H)	1–1 (A)	2–3	
2026–27	UNA Strassen	Q1	(San Marino) La Fiorita	1–0 (H)	2–0 (A)	3–0	
2026–27	UNA Strassen	Q2	(Serbia) Partizan	0–4 (H)	0–1 (A)	0–5	
2026–27	Atert Bissen	Q2	(Hungary) ETO Győr	2–6 (H)	1–1 (A)	3–7	

PR = Preliminary round; QR = Qualifying round; R1/R2 = First/Second round; Q1/Q2/Q3 = First/Second/Third qualifying round; PO: Play-off Round; Grp: Group Stage

== Defunct competitions ==
=== Cup Winners' Cup ===
As of 27 August 1998

Cup Winners' Cup
Season	Team	Round	Opponent	1st Leg	2nd Leg	Agg	Playoff
1960–61	Did not participate						
1961–62	Alliance Dudelange	R1	(East Germany) Motor Jena	0–7 (A)	2–2 (H)	2–9	
1962–63	Alliance Dudelange	PR	(Denmark) B 1909	1–1 (H)	1–8 (A)	2–9	
1963–64	Union Luxembourg	R1	(West Germany) Hamburger SV	0–4 (A)	2–3 (H)	2–7	
1964–65	Union Luxembourg	R1	(West Germany) 1860 Munich	0–4 (H)	0–6 (A)	0–10	
1965–66	Spora Luxembourg	R1	(East Germany) 1. FC Magdeburg	0–1 (A)	0–2 (H)	0–3	
1966–67	Spora Luxembourg	R1	(Republic of Ireland) Shamrock Rovers	1–4 (A)	1–4 (H)	2–8	
1967–68	Aris	R1	(France) Lyon	0–3 (H)	1–2 (A)	1–5	
1968–69	US Rumelange	R1	(Malta) Sliema Wanderers	2–1 (H)	0–1 (A)	2–2	
1969–70	Union Luxembourg	R1	(Turkey) Göztepe	0–3 (A)	2–3 (H)	2–6	
1970–71	Union Luxembourg	R1	(Turkey) Göztepe	0–5 (A)	1–0 (H)	1–5	
1971–72	Jeunesse Hautcharage	R1	(England) Chelsea	0–8 (H)	0–13 (A)	0–21	
1972–73	Red Boys Differdange	R1	(Italy) Milan	1–4 (H)	0–3 (A)	1–7	
1973–74	Fola Esch	R1	(Bulgaria) PFC Beroe Stara Zagora	0–7 (A)	1–4 (H)	1–11	
1974–75	Avenir Beggen	R1	(Cyprus) Enosis Neon Paralimni	Walkover (Note: Avenir Beggen were awarded a Walkover after Enosis Neon Paralimni withdrew due to the political situation in Cyprus)			
1974–75	Avenir Beggen	R2	(Socialist Federal Republic of Yugoslavia) Red Star Belgrade	1–6 (H)	1–5 (A)	2–11	
1975–76	US Rumelange	R1	(Socialist Federal Republic of Yugoslavia) FK Borac Banja Luka	0–9 (A)	1–5 (H)	1–14	
1976–77	Aris	R1	(Northern Ireland) Carrick Rangers	1–3 (A)	2–1 (H)	3–4	
1977–78	Progrès Niederkorn	R1	(Denmark) VB	0–1 (H)	0–9 (A)	0–10	
1978–79	Union Luxembourg	R1	(Norway) F.K. Bodø/Glimt	1–4 (A)	1–0 (H)	2–4	
1979–80	Aris	R1	(Finland) Reipas Lahti	1–0 (A)	1–0 (H)	2–0	
1979–80	Aris	R2	(Spain) FC Barcelona	1–4 (H)	1–7 (A)	2–11	
1980–81	Spora Luxembourg	R1	(Czech Republic) Sparta Prague	0–6 (H)	0–6 (A)	0–12	
1981–82	Jeunesse Esch	R1	(Socialist Federal Republic of Yugoslavia) Velež Mostar	1–1 (H)	1–6 (A)	2–7	
1982–83	Red Boys Differdange	R1	(Belgium) Waterschei Thor	1–7 (A)	0–1 (H)	1–8	
1983–84	Avenir Beggen	R1	(Switzerland) Servette	0–4 (A)	1–5 (H)	1–9	
1984–85	Union Luxembourg	R1	(Bulgaria) Trakia Plovdiv	0–4 (A)	1–1 (H)	1–5	
1985–86	Red Boys Differdange	R1	(Sweden) AIK	0–8 (A)	0–5 (H)	0–13	
1986–87	Union Luxembourg	R1	(Greece) Olympiacos	0–3 (A)	0–3 (H)	0–6	
1987–88	Avenir Beggen	R1	(West Germany) Hamburg	0–5 (H)	0–3 (A)	0–8	
1988–89	Avenir Beggen	R1	(Belgium) Mechelen	0–5 (A)	1–3 (H)	1–8	
1989–90	Union Luxembourg	R1	(Sweden) Djurgården	0–0 (H)	0–5 (A)	0–5	
1990–91	Swift Hesperange	R1	(Poland) Legia Warsaw	0–3 (A)	0–3 (H)	0–6	
1991–92	Jeunesse Esch	R1	(Sweden) Norrköping	0–4 (A)	1–2 (H)	1–6	
1992–93	Avenir Beggen	QR	(Faroe Islands) B36 Tórshavn	1–0 (H)	1–1 (A)	2–1	
1992–93	Avenir Beggen	R1	(Russia) Spartak Moscow	0–0 (A)	1–5 (H)	1–5	
1993–94	F91 Dudelange	QR	(Israel) Maccabi Haifa	0–1 (H)	1–6 (A)	1–7	
1994–95	F91 Dudelange	QR	(Hungary) Ferencváros	1–6 (A)	1–6 (H)	2–12	
1995–96	Grevenmacher	QR	(Iceland) KR Reykjavík	3–2 (H)	0–2 (A)	3–4	
1996–97	Union Luxembourg	QR	(Croatia) Varteks	1–2 (A)	0–3 (H)	1–5	
1997–98	Union Luxembourg	QR	(Slovenia) Primorje	0–2 (A)	0–1 (H)	0–3	
1998–99	Grevenmacher	QR	(Romania) Rapid București	2–6 (H)	0–2 (A)	2–8	

PR = Preliminary round; QR = Qualifying round; R1/R2 = First/Second round

=== UEFA Intertoto Cup ===
As of 13 July 2008

Intertoto Cup
Season	Team	Round	Opponent	1st Leg	2nd Leg	Agg	Playoff
1995	Did not participate						
1996	Did not participate						
1997	Did not participate						
1998	Hobscheid	R1	(Czech Republic) Hradec Králové	0–0 (H)	1–2 (A)	1–2	
1999	Union Luxembourg	R1	(Hungary) Vasas	1–3 (H)	0–4 (A)	1–7	
2000	Hobscheid	R1	(North Macedonia) Pelister	1–3 (A)	0–1 (H)	1–4	
2001	Hobscheid	R1	(Belarus) Dinamo Minsk	0–6 (A)	1–1 (H)	1–7	
2002	Union Luxembourg	R1	(Romania) Gloria Bistrița	0–2 (A)	0–0 (H)	0–2	
2003	Union Luxembourg	R1	(Serbia and Montenegro) Sutjeska	0–3 (A)	1–1 (H)	1–4	
2004	Grevenmacher	R1	(Finland) Tampere United	1–1 (H)	0–0 (A)	1–1	
2005	Victoria Rosport	R1	(Sweden) Göteborg	1–2 (H)	1–3 (A)	2–5	
2006	Grevenmacher	R1	(Slovakia) Nitra	2–6 (A)	0–6 (H)	2–12	
2007	Differdange 03	R1	(Slovakia) Slovan Bratislava	0–2 (H)	0–3 (A)	0–5	
2008	Etzella Ettelbruck	R1	(Georgia (country)) Lokomotivi Tbilisi	0–0 (H)	2–2 (A)	2–2	
2008	Etzella Ettelbruck	R2	(Russia) Saturn Moscow Oblast	0–7 (A)	1–1 (H)	1–8	

R1/R2 = First/Second round
