= 1935–36 Luxembourg National Division =

Luxembourg National Division
- Season: 1935–36
- Champions: CA Spora Luxembourg (6th title)
- Matches: 90
- Goals: 447 (4.97 per match)
- Highest scoring: US Dudelange 10–2 FC Aris Bonnevoie

The 1935–36 Luxembourg National Division was the 26th season of top level association football in Luxembourg.

== Overview ==
It was contested by 10 teams, and CA Spora Luxembourg won the championship.

== League standings ==
Pos	Team	Pld	W	D	L	GF	GA	GD	Pts
1	CA Spora Luxembourg	18	13	2	3	71	28	+43	28
2	Jeunesse Esch	18	12	2	4	50	21	+29	26
3	FA Red Boys Differdange	18	10	2	6	58	36	+22	22
4	US Dudelange	18	8	3	7	55	49	+6	19
5	CS Fola Esch	18	7	3	8	43	34	+9	17
6	Union Luxembourg	18	8	1	9	34	48	−14	17
7	FC Red Black Pfaffenthal	18	8	0	10	34	68	−34	16
8	FC Aris Bonnevoie	18	7	1	10	33	60	−27	15
9	AS Differdange	18	5	1	12	42	51	−9	11
10	National Schifflange	18	4	1	13	27	52	−25	9

Source: rsssf.com

== Results ==
Home \ Away	ARI	ASD	USD	FOL	JEU	NAT	RBP	RBD	SPO	UNI
Aris Bonnevoie		1–4	6–2	2–1	1–4	4–0	1–0	1–2	4–3	1–3
AS Differdange	0–1		5–5	4–7	1–2	2–1	3–4	1–3	1–5	7–0
US Dudelange	10–2	0–1		3–1	1–1	6–2	2–0	5–3	1–5	2–3
Fola Esch	5–2	2–0	1–2		2–0	3–1	6–1	2–3	3–4	1–1
Jeunesse Esch	3–2	2–5	5–2	2–0		4–0	5–1	2–2	1–0	9–0
National Schifflange	8–0	5–4	2–3	1–1	1–0		1–2	1–0	1–6	1–3
Red Black Pfaffenthal	3–1	2–1	3–2	4–3	0–4	4–2		2–5	0–7	5–4
Red Boys Differdange	9–0	5–1	3–2	0–0	1–4	4–0	6–1		3–4	4–1
Spora Luxembourg	2–2	3–1	4–4	4–2	1–2	3–0	11–0	5–2		2–1
Union Luxembourg	1–2	3–1	2–3	0–3	1–0	3–0	4–2	4–3	0–2	

Legend: Blue = home team win; Yellow = draw; Red = away team win.

== Bibliography ==
- Luxembourg - List of final tables (RSSSF)
