= Jean Wagner (footballer) =

Luxembourgish footballer

Personal information
- Date of birth: 3 December 1969 (age 56)
- Height: 1.90 m (6 ft 3 in)
- Position: Defender

Senior career*
Years	Team	Apps	(Gls)
1989–2005	Jeunesse Esch		
2005–2010	Differdange 03		

International career
2007–2008	Luxembourg	7	(0)
- * Club domestic league appearances and goals

Jean Wagner (born 3 December 1969) is a retired Luxembourgish football defender.
