= 1958–59 Luxembourg National Division =

Luxembourg National Division
- Season: 1958–59
- Champions: Jeunesse Esch (6th title)
- Matches: 132
- Goals: 450 (3.41 per match)
- Highest scoring: SC Tétange 6–2 Jeunesse Wasserbillig; CA Spora Luxembourg 6–2 Union Luxembourg; CA Spora Luxembourg 5–3 Chiers Rodange

The 1958–59 Luxembourg National Division was the 45th season of top level association football in Luxembourg.

== Overview ==
It was performed in 12 teams, and Jeunesse Esch won the championship.

== League standings ==
| Pos | Team | Pld | W | D | L | GF | GA | GD | Pts |
|---|---|---|---|---|---|---|---|---|---|
| 1 | Jeunesse Esch | 22 | 14 | 4 | 4 | 55 | 22 | +33 | 32 |
| 2 | CA Spora Luxembourg | 22 | 10 | 6 | 6 | 49 | 40 | +9 | 26 |
| 3 | FA Red Boys Differdange | 22 | 11 | 4 | 7 | 39 | 32 | +7 | 26 |
| 4 | Stade Dudelange | 22 | 9 | 8 | 5 | 32 | 29 | +3 | 26 |
| 5 | Alliance Dudelange | 22 | 9 | 5 | 8 | 43 | 37 | +6 | 23 |
| 6 | FC Progrès Niedercorn | 22 | 8 | 6 | 8 | 36 | 38 | −2 | 22 |
| 7 | Union Luxembourg | 22 | 8 | 5 | 9 | 44 | 47 | −3 | 21 |
| 8 | CS Grevenmacher | 22 | 6 | 8 | 8 | 34 | 33 | +1 | 20 |
| 9 | SC Tétange | 22 | 7 | 4 | 11 | 34 | 41 | −7 | 18 |
| 10 | National Schifflange | 22 | 4 | 10 | 8 | 29 | 39 | −10 | 18 |
| 11 | Jeunesse Wasserbillig | 22 | 7 | 3 | 12 | 23 | 40 | −17 | 17 |
| 12 | Chiers Rodange | 22 | 5 | 5 | 12 | 32 | 52 | −20 | 15 |

Source: rsssf.com

== Results ==
| Home \ Away | ALD | CHI | GRE | JEU | NAT | PRO | RBD | SPO | STD | TÉT | UNI | WAS |
|---|---|---|---|---|---|---|---|---|---|---|---|---|
| Alliance Dudelange | | 2–0 | 1–0 | 3–1 | 1–1 | 3–0 | 3–2 | 4–2 | 3–3 | 1–2 | 2–3 | 2–2 |
| Chiers Rodange | 3–2 | | 1–1 | 1–6 | 3–1 | 1–3 | 1–2 | 0–0 | 2–3 | 4–0 | 1–4 | 1–0 |
| Grevenmacher | 2–1 | 1–2 | | 1–3 | 1–1 | 1–0 | 1–2 | 2–2 | 0–1 | 2–2 | 5–0 | 1–0 |
| Jeunesse Esch | 2–1 | 5–0 | 2–0 | | 2–2 | 5–0 | 1–1 | 2–0 | 0–0 | 0–1 | 3–1 | 6–0 |
| National Schifflange | 0–3 | 5–2 | 2–1 | 1–2 | | 1–5 | 1–1 | 2–2 | 1–1 | 0–2 | 1–1 | 1–0 |
| Progrès Niederkorn | 3–3 | 2–2 | 2–2 | 3–2 | 1–1 | | 1–0 | 5–1 | 0–0 | 1–0 | 2–1 | 0–1 |
| Red Boys Differdange | 1–1 | 2–1 | 2–3 | 1–4 | 3–1 | 3–0 | | 3–1 | 3–1 | 3–0 | 2–1 | 0–0 |
| Spora Luxembourg | 4–0 | 5–3 | 3–3 | 3–3 | 2–1 | 1–0 | 3–0 | | 1–1 | 0–1 | 6–2 | 3–0 |
| Stade Dudelange | 2–1 | 2–2 | 3–3 | 1–0 | 1–0 | 1–2 | 2–1 | 1–2 | | 0–0 | 1–3 | 3–0 |
| Tétange | 1–2 | 4–1 | 0–3 | 1–2 | 2–2 | 3–2 | 1–3 | 2–4 | 1–2 | | 2–3 | 6–2 |
| Union Luxembourg | 1–4 | 1–1 | 3–1 | 1–2 | 2–2 | 2–2 | 4–2 | 2–3 | 1–2 | 2–2 | | 3–1 |
| Jeunesse Wasserbillig | 2–0 | 1–0 | 0–0 | 0–2 | 1–2 | 4–2 | 1–2 | 3–1 | 3–1 | 2–1 | 0–3 | |

Legend: Blue = home team win; Yellow = draw; Red = away team win.
