= 2014–15 Luxembourg National Division =

Luxembourg National Division
- Season: 2014–15
- Champions: Fola Esch
- Relegated: FC Jeunesse Canach; US Hostert; UN Käerjeng 97
- Champions League: Fola Esch
- Europa League: FC Differdange 03; F91 Dudelange; FC Progrès Niederkorn
- Matches: 182
- Goals: 540 (2.97 per match)
- Top goalscorer: (Bosnia and Herzegovina) Sanel Ibrahimović (21 goals)
- Biggest home win: Fola Esch 7–1 Rumelange; Niederkorn 6–0 Grevenmacher
- Biggest away win: Käerjeng 0–5 Dudelange; Mondorf 0–5 Dudelange
- Highest scoring: Fola Esch 7–1 Rumelange

Location of the 2014–15 Luxembourg National Division teams

The 2014–15 Luxembourg National Division was the 101st season of top-tier football in Luxembourg. It began on 1 August 2014 and ended on 23 May 2015. F91 Dudelange were the defending champions having won their eleventh league championship in the previous season.

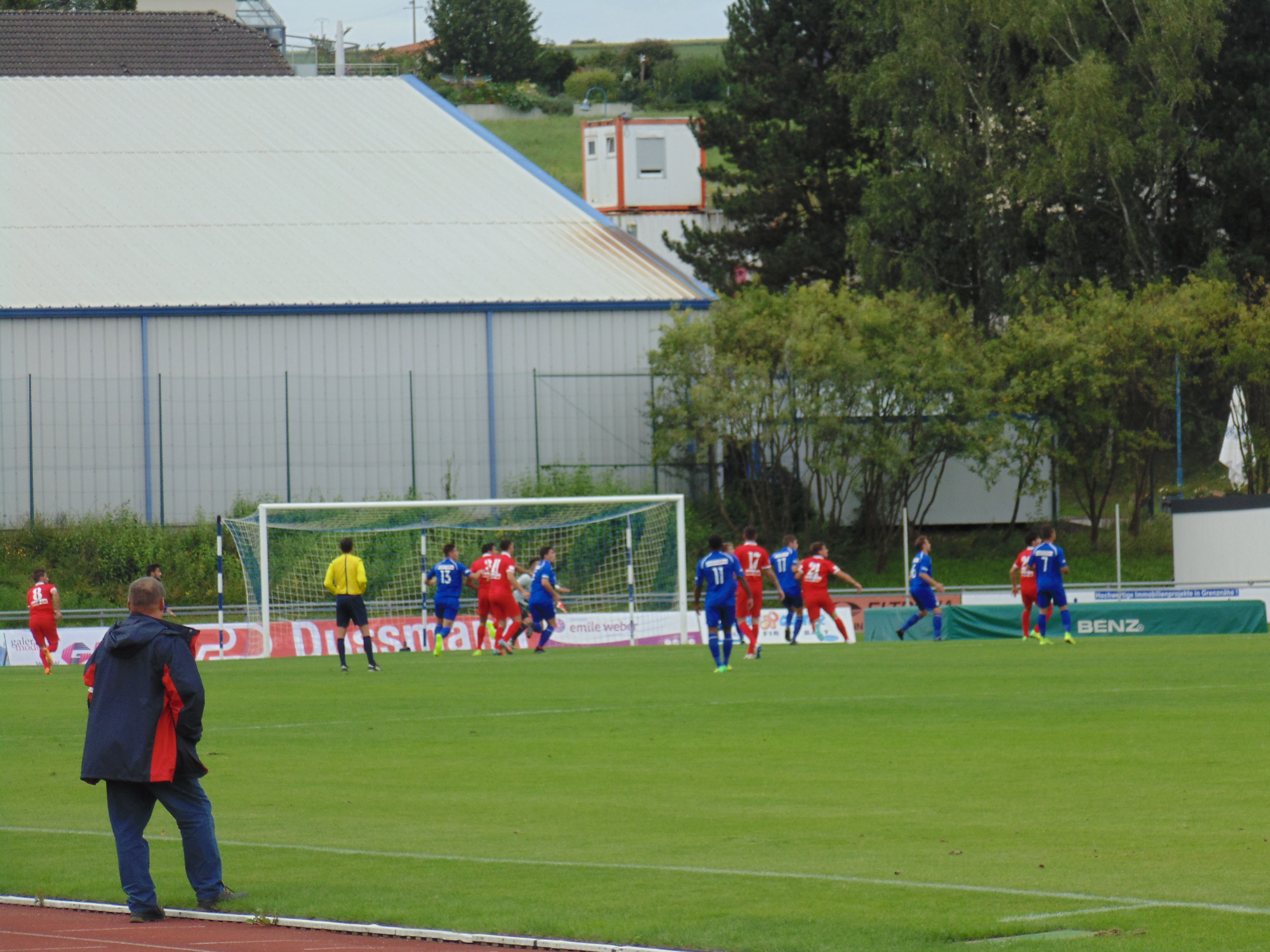
Picture of the CS Grevenmacher-FC Differdange 03 match, 17 August 2014

== Teams ==
Team	Venue	Capacity
FC Differdange 03	Stade du Thillenberg	7,830
F91 Dudelange	Stade Jos Nosbaum	2,600
FC Etzella Ettelbruck	Stade Am Deich	2,650
CS Fola Esch	Stade Émile Mayrisch	3,900
CS Grevenmacher	Op Flohr Stadion	4,000
FC Jeunesse Canach	Stade Rue de Lenningen	1,000
Jeunesse Esch	Stade de la Frontière	5,400
UN Käerjeng 97	Stade um Bëchel	1,000
US Rumelange	Stade Municipal	2,950
FC Progrès Niederkorn	Stade Jos Haupert	4,830
US Mondorf-les-Bains	Stade John Grün	3,600
FC Victoria Rosport	VictoriArena	2,500
US Hostert	Stade Jos Becker	1,500
FC Wiltz 71	Stade Géitz	2,000

== League table ==
Pos	Team	Pld	W	D	L	GF	GA	GD	Pts	Qualification or relegation
1	Fola Esch (C)	26	19	4	3	63	21	+42	61	Qualification to Champions League second qualifying round
2	FC Differdange 03	26	18	5	3	61	31	+30	59	Qualification to Europa League first qualifying round (Note: Since both finalists of 2014–15 Luxembourg Cup have secured a spot in Europa League first qualifying round based on league position the spot for cup winner is passed to the best-ranked team not already qualified, which is the fourth-placed team.)
3	F91 Dudelange	26	16	6	4	55	20	+35	54	Qualification to Europa League first qualifying round
4	Progrès Niederkorn	26	15	5	6	51	29	+22	50	Qualification to Europa League first qualifying round
5	Jeunesse Esch	26	12	8	6	46	34	+12	44	
6	FC Victoria Rosport	26	8	7	11	36	46	−10	31	
7	Etzella Ettelbruck	26	9	3	14	36	50	−14	30	
8	US Mondorf-les-Bains	26	8	5	13	30	40	−10	29	
9	CS Grevenmacher	26	8	5	13	24	48	−24	29	
10	US Rumelange	26	7	7	12	29	38	−9	28	
11	Wiltz	26	7	6	13	29	38	−9	27	
12	UN Käerjéng 97 (R)	26	8	3	15	33	52	−19	27	Qualification to Relegation play-offs
13	US Hostert (R)	26	5	8	13	35	52	−17	23	Relegation to Luxembourg Division of Honour
14	Jeunesse Canach (R)	26	3	6	17	16	45	−29	15	Relegation to Luxembourg Division of Honour

Source: uefa.com
Rules for classification: 1) points; 2) goal difference; 3) number of goals scored
(C) Champions; (R) Relegated

== Results ==
Home \ Away	DUD	FOL	DIF	JEU	PRO	ETZ	KÄE	GRE	WIL	JEC	RUM	MON	VIC	HOS
F91 Dudelange		0–2	2–1	2–2	1–0	2–0	2–3	5–0	3–0	3–0	2–0	0–0	4–0	3–1
Fola Esch	3–0		2–3	1–1	2–4	2–1	4–0	3–0	2–1	1–0	7–1	4–1	4–2	3–1
Differdange 03	1–1	1–1		3–2	3–1	2–1	5–0	1–1	3–0	2–1	2–1	3–2	3–2	6–1
Jeunesse Esch	0–4	0–1	3–3		2–2	5–1	2–0	4–2	2–0	4–2	2–1	1–0	2–1	2–2
Progrès Niederkorn	1–2	1–0	1–2	2–2		3–0	3–0	6–0	2–0	1–0	1–0	2–2	2–0	3–3
Etzella Ettelbruck	0–0	0–3	1–2	0–3	2–3		0–3	2–3	2–1	4–0	1–0	3–0	1–1	3–2
UN Käerjeng 97	0–5	0–3	1–3	1–3	2–1	2–3		1–2	1–1	1–2	2–2	2–0	0–1	2–0
Grevenmacher	0–2	1–5	0–0	1–3	1–0	0–2	0–2		0–3	1–0	0–2	0–0	2–2	2–1
Wiltz	3–0	1–1	2–1	0–0	0–0	3–1	0–2	1–0		1–1	0–1	2–0	1–2	3–3
Jeunesse Canach	0–0	0–1	1–2	0–0	1–2	1–4	1–5	0–3	0–3		0–1	0–1	0–0	1–0
Rumelange	1–1	0–1	1–2	0–1	2–4	0–0	3–1	0–3	4–0	1–0		1–1	2–2	2–2
Mondorf-les-Bains	0–5	0–1	1–2	2–1	1–0	4–1	3–1	1–2	3–1	1–2	0–1		1–0	1–1
Victoria Rosport	1–2	1–5	0–4	3–1	1–1	2–1	0–0	2–0	2–1	1–1	2–1	1–4		4–1
US Hostert	1–4	1–1	2–1	0–1	1–2	1–2	3–0	0–0	2–1	2–2	1–1	2–1	2–1	

Source: Soccerway
Legend: Blue = home team win; Yellow = draw; Red = away team win.

== Relegation play-offs ==
A match was played between the 12th placed (UN Käerjéng 97) team in the 2014–15 Luxembourg National Division and the 3rd placed (Strassen) team in the 2014–15 Luxembourg Division of Honour. The winner earned a place in the 2015–16 Luxembourg National Division.

29 May 2015
19:30

UN Käerjéng 97	0–3	Strassen
		Jager 15' 48'; Gilson Delgado 88'

Stade Alphonse Theis
Attendance: 2.200
Referee: Alain Durieux

== Top goalscorers ==
As of 24 May 2015

Rank	Player	Club	Goals
1	(Bosnia and Herzegovina) Sanel Ibrahimović	Jeunesse Esch	21
2	(Armenia) Aleksandre Karapetian	F91 Dudelange	15
3	(Luxembourg) Jeff Lascak	Victoria Rosport	14
4	(Morocco) Samir Hadji	Fola Esch	12
4	(France) Hakim Menai	Progrès Niederkorn	12
6	(Morocco) Omar Er Rafik	Differdange 03	11
6	(Luxembourg) Antonio Luisi	Differdange 03	11
6	(Portugal) Jose Inacio Cabral Barbosa	US Rumelange	11
9	(France) Lévy Rougeaux	Progrès Niederkorn	10
10	(France) Gauthier Caron	Differdange 03	9
10	(Germany) Jakob Dallevedove	Fola Esch	9
10	(France) Grégory Adler	US Hostert	9

== Attendances ==
#	Football club	Home games	Average attendance
1	Jeunesse Esch	13	1,054
2	FC Differdange 03	13	703
3	F91 Dudelange	13	597
4	FC Progrès Niederkorn	13	505
5	CS Fola Esch	13	437
6	CS Grevenmacher	13	403
7	FC Victoria Rosport	13	402
8	UN Käerjeng 97	13	363
9	US Mondorf-les-Bains	13	348
10	FC Etzella Ettelbruck	13	343
11	US Rumelange	13	296
12	US Hostert	13	292
13	FC Wiltz 71	13	275
14	FC Jeunesse Canach	13	170

== See also ==
- 2014–15 Luxembourg Cup
