= 1931–32 Luxembourg National Division =

Luxembourg National Division
- Season: 1931–32
- Champions: FA Red Boys Differdange (4th title)
- Matches: 56
- Goals: 248 (4.43 per match)
- Highest scoring: FA Red Boys Differdange 7–1 FC Aris Bonnevoie; US Dudelange 6–2 National Schifflange; CA Spora Luxembourg 4–4 CS Fola Esch

The 1931–32 Luxembourg National Division was the 22nd season of top level association football in Luxembourg.

== Overview ==
It was contested by eight teams, and FA Red Boys Differdange won the championship.

== League standings ==
Pos	Team	Pld	W	D	L	GF	GA	GD	Pts
1	FA Red Boys Differdange	14	9	3	2	39	19	+20	21
2	FC Progrès Niedercorn	14	10	1	3	34	22	+12	21
3	CA Spora Luxembourg	14	5	4	5	42	33	+9	14
4	Union Luxembourg	14	6	2	6	31	34	−3	14
5	National Schifflange	14	5	3	6	30	32	−2	13
6	CS Fola Esch	14	4	3	7	25	28	−3	11
7	US Dudelange	14	4	3	7	28	33	−5	11
8	FC Aris Bonnevoie	14	2	3	9	19	47	−28	7

Source: rsssf.com

== Results ==
Home \ Away	ARI	USD	FOL	NAT	PRO	RBD	SPO	UNI
Aris Bonnevoie		2–5	0–2	2–5	2–2	1–1	1–5	4–3
US Dudelange	3–0		2–4	6–2	1–3	2–3	2–2	0–4
Fola Esch	1–2	5–1		1–1	0–3	1–1	2–1	3–4
National Schifflange	1–1	1–3	2–1		1–2	1–2	5–2	2–2
Progrès Niederkorn	1–0	3–0	3–0	1–3		4–1	4–2	1–3
Red Boys Differdange	7–1	1–0	2–0	4–2	6–1		2–1	5–0
Spora Luxembourg	7–0	2–2	4–4	3–1	2–4	3–3		3–1
Union Luxembourg	4–3	1–1	2–1	2–3	1–2	2–1	2–5	

Legend: Blue = home team win; Yellow = draw; Red = away team win.
