= 1979–80 Luxembourg National Division =

Luxembourg National Division
- Season: 1979–80

The 1979–80 Luxembourg National Division was the 66th season of top level association football in Luxembourg.

== Overview ==
It was performed in 12 teams, and Jeunesse Esch won the championship.

== League standings ==
Pos	Team	Pld	W	D	L	GF	GA	GD	Pts
1	Jeunesse Esch	22	16	1	5	43	25	+18	33
2	FA Red Boys Differdange	22	14	4	4	52	21	+31	32
3	FC Progrès Niedercorn	22	11	8	3	58	28	+30	30
4	Union Luxembourg	22	12	5	5	48	29	+19	29
5	CS Grevenmacher	22	6	10	6	27	32	−5	22
6	Stade Dudelange	22	7	5	10	29	33	−4	19
7	CA Spora Luxembourg	22	6	7	9	29	33	−4	19
8	FC Avenir Beggen	22	7	4	11	33	33	0	18
9	FC Aris Bonnevoie	22	6	6	10	26	36	−10	18
10	FC Etzella Ettelbruck	22	7	3	12	30	44	−14	17
11	Chiers Rodange	22	6	4	12	18	44	−26	16
12	US Rumelange	22	4	3	15	21	56	−35	11

Source: rsssf.com

== Results ==
Home \ Away	ARI	AVE	CHI	ETZ	GRE	JEU	PRO	RBD	RUM	SPO	STD	UNI
Aris Bonnevoie		3–0	2–2	1–0	2–3	1–2	2–2	1–6	3–2	2–2	2–0	0–1
Avenir Beggen	1–1		3–0	1–1	8–0	2–3	1–2	0–3	2–1	0–1	2–0	0–5
Chiers Rodange	1–0	0–3		2–1	0–0	0–2	3–2	0–2	0–1	2–1	0–3	2–0
Etzella Ettelbruck	2–1	2–1	0–0		1–3	1–5	0–4	1–2	5–0	0–4	1–0	2–4
Grevenmacher	3–0	0–2	4–1	0–1		1–2	3–2	2–2	1–1	0–0	3–1	1–1
Jeunesse Esch	1–0	1–0	1–1	2–0	2–0		2–3	3–1	2–0	2–1	2–1	2–1
Progrès Niederkorn	1–1	2–2	8–0	2–2	0–0	3–1		1–4	9–0	3–0	1–1	2–2
Red Boys Differdange	3–0	3–0	3–0	4–2	0–0	2–0	1–2		6–1	2–1	0–0	1–0
Rumelange	0–1	1–0	1–3	1–2	0–0	3–2	0–2	1–4		1–1	2–0	2–3
Spora Luxembourg	0–2	2–2	1–0	1–0	1–1	0–2	1–4	1–1	4–1		3–2	1–2
Stade Dudelange	3–0	2–1	2–1	3–2	2–2	1–3	0–1	3–1	2–1	1–1		1–1
Union Luxembourg	1–1	0–2	4–0	3–4	3–0	3–1	2–2	2–1	4–1	3–2	3–1	

Legend: Blue = home team win; Yellow = draw; Red = away team win.
