= 1926–27 Luxembourg National Division =

Luxembourg National Division
- Season: 1926–27
- Champions: Union Luxembourg (1st title)
- Matches: 56
- Goals: 264 (4.71 per match)
- Highest scoring: CS Fola Esch 8–3 FC Progrès Niedercorn

The 1926–27 Luxembourg National Division was the 17th season of top level association football in Luxembourg.

== Overview ==
It was contested by 8 teams, and Union Luxembourg won the championship.

== League standings ==
Pos	Team	Pld	W	D	L	GF	GA	GD	Pts
1	Union Luxembourg	14	9	3	2	41	25	+16	21
2	FA Red Boys Differdange	14	7	4	3	47	21	+26	18
3	CA Spora Luxembourg	14	6	5	3	37	25	+12	17
4	Jeunesse Esch	14	7	2	5	39	34	+5	16
5	CS Fola Esch	14	6	3	5	36	27	+9	15
6	FC Red Black Pfaffenthal	14	3	5	6	14	26	−12	11
7	FC Aris Bonnevoie	14	3	2	9	28	57	−29	8
8	FC Progrès Niedercorn	14	3	0	11	22	49	−27	6

Source: rsssf.com

== Results ==
Home \ Away	ARI	FOL	JEU	PRO	RBP	RBD	SPO	UNI
Aris Bonnevoie		3–4	0–7	2–1	3–3	3–5	2–2	6–4
Fola Esch	5–1		1–4	8–3	0–1	3–0	1–1	2–2
Jeunesse Esch	5–2	2–1		7–1	0–1	2–2	0–6	3–4
Progrès Niederkorn	5–3	1–2	0–3		0–1	1–6	3–0	3–5
Red Black Pfaffenthal	0–1	3–3	1–3	0–2		1–5	0–0	0–1
Red Boys Differdange	6–1	1–3	2–2	8–0	2–2		3–0	5–0
Spora Luxembourg	5–1	4–3	6–1	2–1	5–0	2–2		1–5
Union Luxembourg	5–0	1–0	7–0	2–1	1–1	1–0	3–3	

Legend: Blue = home team win; Yellow = draw; Red = away team win.
