= Marco Grilo =

Portuguese footballer (born 1993)

Personal information
- Full name: Marco António Pereira Grilo
- Date of birth: 22 July 1993 (age 33)
- Place of birth: Alpiarça, Portugal
- Height: 1.76 m (5 ft 9 1/2 in)
- Position: Right back

Team information
- Current team: Differdange 03
- Number: 16

Youth career
- 2001–2002: Águias Alpiarça
- 2002–2003: Académica Santarém
- 2003–2004: Águias Alpiarça
- 2003–2010: Benfica
- 2010–2012: União Leiria

Senior career*
Years	Team	Apps	(Gls)
2012	Carregado	6	(0)
2012–2013	Tourizense	8	(0)
2013–2015	Alcanenense	32	(0)
2015–2016	Eléctrico	24	(2)
2016–2017	Vitória de Sernache	30	(3)
2017–2018	Sertanense	25	(2)
2018–2021	Vilafranquense	69	(2)
2021–2022	Lusitânia	18	(2)
2022–2023	Académica	17	(0)
2023–2026	União Santarém	76	(6)
2026–	Differdange 03	7	(0)
- * Club domestic league appearances and goals as of 16 September 2026

Marco António Pereira Grilo (born 22 July 1993) is a Portuguese professional footballer who plays for Luxembourg National Division club Differdange 03 as a defender.

== Club career ==
He made his Taça da Liga debut for Vilafranquense on 28 July 2019 in a game against Casa Pia.

On 13 July 2021, he signed with Lusitânia.
