= 1973–74 Luxembourg National Division =

Luxembourg National Division
- Season: 1973–74

The 1973–74 Luxembourg National Division was the 60th season of top level association football in Luxembourg.

== Overview ==
It was performed in 12 teams, and Jeunesse Esch won the championship.

== League standings ==
Pos	Team	Pld	W	D	L	GF	GA	GD	Pts
1	Jeunesse Esch	22	18	2	2	54	18	+36	38
2	FA Red Boys Differdange	22	15	2	5	50	27	+23	32
3	CA Spora Luxembourg	22	13	4	5	53	25	+28	30
4	FC Avenir Beggen	22	11	4	7	49	34	+15	26
5	FC Aris Bonnevoie	22	11	3	8	43	28	+15	25
6	Union Luxembourg	22	8	6	8	38	34	+4	22
7	FC Etzella Ettelbruck	22	9	3	10	33	37	−4	21
8	CS Fola Esch	22	8	5	9	40	46	−6	21
9	FC Red Star Merl-Belair	22	8	4	10	29	34	−5	20
10	US Rumelange	22	5	6	11	35	47	−12	16
11	Stade Dudelange	22	3	3	16	26	50	−24	9
12	National Schifflange	22	1	2	19	12	82	−70	4

Source: rsssf.com

== Results ==
Home \ Away	ARI	AVE	ETZ	FOL	JEU	NAT	RBD	RSM	RUM	SPO	STD	UNI
Aris Bonnevoie		5–0	0–2	4–1	0–2	4–0	1–0	4–2	1–2	1–1	1–1	2–0
Avenir Beggen	2–5		3–0	0–0	2–0	8–1	1–3	0–2	1–0	4–0	2–1	3–0
Etzella Ettelbruck	1–3	1–1		4–2	1–3	2–0	2–1	2–0	1–1	1–3	1–3	1–2
Fola Esch	1–2	2–2	1–4		3–4	1–1	0–1	2–2	2–2	0–5	1–0	3–0
Jeunesse Esch	1–0	4–0	5–1	5–3		2–0	1–2	4–0	3–3	3–1	4–1	1–0
National Schifflange	1–1	0–8	0–2	0–1	0–2		1–5	0–2	2–8	0–3	0–2	0–9
Red Boys Differdange	4–0	5–1	2–0	3–1	1–2	4–1		2–1	1–2	0–2	3–2	3–3
Red Star Merl-Belair	0–3	0–2	1–0	0–2	0–1	4–0	1–2		2–2	1–1	5–3	1–0
Rumelange	2–1	0–3	0–1	3–4	0–3	2–1	2–3	0–2		0–3	2–2	2–3
Spora Luxembourg	2–4	1–0	4–1	2–3	0–1	6–1	2–2	3–1	5–0		3–1	2–0
Stade Dudelange	2–1	1–3	1–4	2–3	0–3	1–2	0–1	0–1	1–1	0–3		1–3
Union Luxembourg	1–0	3–3	1–1	0–4	0–0	5–1	1–2	1–1	2–1	1–1	3–1	

Legend: Blue = home team win; Yellow = draw; Red = away team win.
