= Stade Municipal de la Ville de Differdange =

Stadium in Differdange, Luxembourg

Stade de la Ville de Differdange
- Interactive map of Stade de la Ville de Differdange
- Location: Avenue Parc des Sports, Differdange, Luxembourg
- Coordinates: 49.5139°N 5.8898°E
- Capacity: 2,400

Construction
- Groundbreaking: 2011
- Opened: 2012

Tenant
- Differdange 03

The Stade Municipal de la Ville de Differdange or simply Stade Municipal is a stadium in the town of Differdange, Luxembourg. It is one of the home grounds of FC Differdange 03, along with Stade du Thillenberg, and holds 2,400 people with 1,922 seats.

== History ==
The stadium was constructed between May 2011 and August 2012. It was initially a project to replace Stade Josy Barthel as Luxembourg's new national stadium.
