= 1980–81 Luxembourg National Division =

Luxembourg National Division
- Season: 1980–81

The 1980–81 Luxembourg National Division was the 67th season of top level association football in Luxembourg.

== Overview ==
It was performed in 12 teams, and FC Progrès Niedercorn won the championship.

== League standings ==
Pos	Team	Pld	W	D	L	GF	GA	GD	Pts
1	FC Progrès Niedercorn	22	17	1	4	68	25	+43	35
2	FA Red Boys Differdange	22	15	4	3	60	24	+36	34
3	Jeunesse Esch	22	14	3	5	48	23	+25	31
4	FC Aris Bonnevoie	22	10	6	6	35	27	+8	26
5	FC Avenir Beggen	22	9	4	9	29	33	−4	22
6	Union Luxembourg	22	9	3	10	41	43	−2	21
7	FC Olympique Eischen	22	8	4	10	27	32	−5	20
8	Alliance Dudelange	22	7	6	9	29	37	−8	20
9	CS Grevenmacher	22	6	4	12	20	48	−28	16
10	CA Spora Luxembourg	22	6	3	13	28	41	−13	15
11	FC Etzella Ettelbruck	22	5	4	13	22	41	−19	14
12	Stade Dudelange	22	4	2	16	22	55	−33	10

Source: rsssf.com

== Results ==
Home \ Away	ALD	ARI	AVE	ETZ	GRE	JEU	OLY	PRO	RBD	SPO	STD	UNI
Alliance Dudelange		2–0	1–2	2–0	1–1	0–1	1–0	0–5	3–3	2–0	2–0	1–2
Aris Bonnevoie	3–1		6–1	4–1	3–2	1–1	0–2	1–3	0–0	0–0	1–0	2–1
Avenir Beggen	2–3	0–0		1–0	0–2	3–2	3–0	1–2	2–2	0–1	5–3	2–1
Etzella Ettelbruck	2–1	0–0	0–1		0–2	1–1	0–0	0–5	0–4	1–2	3–2	2–3
Grevenmacher	0–0	0–1	2–1	1–1		0–3	2–1	0–6	0–2	3–2	2–1	2–6
Jeunesse Esch	2–0	3–4	3–0	3–2	3–0		0–2	1–2	1–3	2–0	2–0	3–0
Olympique Eischen	2–2	0–0	1–2	1–2	0–0	0–6		1–0	0–3	3–1	4–1	4–2
Progrès Niederkorn	5–1	3–1	3–1	0–2	6–0	2–2	4–2		3–2	5–2	2–3	4–0
Red Boys Differdange	2–2	1–0	0–0	4–1	5–0	0–3	3–0	3–1		5–1	7–1	4–3
Spora Luxembourg	4–2	2–3	1–2	2–0	2–0	1–2	1–1	0–1	0–2		1–1	1–3
Stade Dudelange	1–3	0–2	0–1	2–1	1–0	2–1	0–3	0–2	0–5	0–2		1–1
Union Luxembourg	1–1	4–3	0–0	0–3	3–1	1–2	1–0	1–2	1–2	3–2	4–1	

Legend: Blue = home team win; Yellow = draw; Red = away team win.
