= 1957–58 Luxembourg National Division =

Luxembourg National Division
- Season: 1957–58
- Champions: Jeunesse Esch (5th title)
- Matches: 132
- Goals: 487 (3.69 per match)
- Highest scoring: Jeunesse Esch 7–3 Union Luxembourg

The 1957–58 Luxembourg National Division was the 44th season of top level association football in Luxembourg.

== Overview ==
It was performed in 12 teams, and Jeunesse Esch won the championship.

== League standings ==
| Pos | Team | Pld | W | D | L | GF | GA | GD | Pts |
|---|---|---|---|---|---|---|---|---|---|
| 1 | Jeunesse Esch | 22 | 15 | 5 | 2 | 52 | 20 | +32 | 35 |
| 2 | FA Red Boys Differdange | 22 | 13 | 4 | 5 | 46 | 27 | +19 | 30 |
| 3 | Stade Dudelange | 22 | 12 | 4 | 6 | 40 | 27 | +13 | 28 |
| 4 | SC Tétange | 22 | 10 | 5 | 7 | 32 | 28 | +4 | 25 |
| 5 | CA Spora Luxembourg | 22 | 8 | 6 | 8 | 47 | 41 | +6 | 22 |
| 6 | Chiers Rodange | 22 | 8 | 6 | 8 | 47 | 50 | −3 | 22 |
| 7 | Union Luxembourg | 22 | 9 | 3 | 10 | 36 | 45 | −9 | 21 |
| 8 | CS Grevenmacher | 22 | 8 | 4 | 10 | 34 | 38 | −4 | 20 |
| 9 | FC Progrès Niedercorn | 22 | 7 | 6 | 9 | 40 | 44 | −4 | 20 |
| 10 | Alliance Dudelange | 22 | 7 | 4 | 11 | 50 | 63 | −13 | 18 |
| 11 | US Dudelange | 22 | 4 | 5 | 13 | 37 | 51 | −14 | 13 |
| 12 | CS Fola Esch | 22 | 3 | 4 | 15 | 26 | 53 | −27 | 10 |

Source: rsssf.com

== Results ==
| Home \ Away | ALD | CHI | USD | FOL | GRE | JEU | PRO | RBD | SPO | STD | TÉT | UNI |
|---|---|---|---|---|---|---|---|---|---|---|---|---|
| Alliance Dudelange | | 3–5 | 1–4 | 4–1 | 7–2 | 0–4 | 2–2 | 1–2 | 5–2 | 2–5 | 1–1 | 3–2 |
| Chiers Rodange | 6–1 | | 1–1 | 3–2 | 2–0 | 1–6 | 4–1 | 3–1 | 1–2 | 2–1 | 0–3 | 2–2 |
| US Dudelange | 3–4 | 1–2 | | 4–0 | 2–1 | 1–1 | 3–0 | 0–1 | 3–5 | 1–3 | 2–3 | 0–3 |
| Fola Esch | 0–1 | 2–2 | 3–3 | | 1–0 | 1–2 | 3–2 | 0–1 | 3–1 | 0–1 | 1–1 | 0–2 |
| Grevenmacher | 1–1 | 1–1 | 5–1 | 2–0 | | 0–3 | 4–2 | 2–1 | 0–0 | 3–2 | 1–0 | 4–2 |
| Jeunesse Esch | 5–4 | 3–1 | 2–0 | 4–1 | 1–0 | | 0–0 | 1–1 | 1–0 | 0–1 | 2–0 | 7–3 |
| Progrès Niederkorn | 2–2 | 3–1 | 6–2 | 2–1 | 4–3 | 0–1 | | 1–1 | 3–0 | 3–1 | 0–4 | 5–0 |
| Red Boys Differdange | 5–2 | 4–2 | 2–0 | 3–1 | 1–1 | 1–1 | 3–1 | | 2–1 | 3–1 | 4–1 | 5–0 |
| Spora Luxembourg | 5–2 | 3–3 | 2–2 | 4–1 | 3–2 | 3–3 | 6–1 | 3–1 | | 1–1 | 0–2 | 4–1 |
| Stade Dudelange | 2–4 | 5–1 | 2–2 | 2–1 | 2–0 | 2–0 | 1–1 | 2–0 | 2–1 | | 2–0 | 0–0 |
| Tétange | 1–0 | 4–3 | 3–2 | 2–2 | 1–0 | 0–2 | 1–1 | 1–3 | 0–0 | 1–0 | | 1–2 |
| Union Luxembourg | 3–0 | 1–1 | 1–0 | 7–2 | 1–2 | 0–3 | 1–0 | 2–1 | 2–1 | 1–2 | 0–2 | |

Legend: Blue = home team win; Yellow = draw; Red = away team win.
