= András Béres =

Hungarian footballer and manager

Personal information
- Date of birth: 20 July 1924
- Place of birth: Budapest, Hungary
- Date of death: 14 November 1993 (aged 69)
- Position: Striker

Senior career*
| Years | Team | Apps | (Gls) |
| 1944–1949 | Kispesti/Honvéd | | |
- Matosz
- Csepel SC
- Vasas SC
| 1957–1959 | Sportclub Enschede | | |
| 1959–1960 | Tubantia Hengelo | | |
| 1960–1962 | Spora Luxembourg | | |

Managerial career
- 1960–1962: Spora Luxembourg
- 1962–1966: K. Beerschot V.A.C.
- 1966–1967: R.S.C. Anderlecht
- Berchem Sport
- 1968–1969: R. Daring Club Molenbeek
- 1970–1972: K. Beerschot V.A.C.
- 1978–1979: Club Brugge
- 1986–1989: Venezuela
- * Club domestic league appearances and goals

András Béres (1924 – 14 November 1993) was a Hungarian football manager and player. He used to coach R.S.C. Anderlecht and Club Brugge among others.
