= 1975–76 Luxembourg National Division =

Luxembourg National Division
- Season: 1975–76

The 1975–76 Luxembourg National Division was the 62nd season of top level association football in Luxembourg.

== Overview ==
It was performed in 12 teams, and Jeunesse Esch won the championship.

== League standings ==
Pos	Team	Pld	W	D	L	GF	GA	GD	Pts
1	Jeunesse Esch	22	14	6	2	50	24	+26	34
2	FA Red Boys Differdange	22	12	6	4	46	24	+22	30
3	US Rumelange	22	9	7	6	32	21	+11	25
4	FC Etzella Ettelbruck	22	10	5	7	39	29	+10	25
5	FC Aris Bonnevoie	22	10	4	8	31	23	+8	24
6	FC Progrès Niedercorn	22	9	4	9	30	37	−7	22
7	Chiers Rodange	22	9	3	10	36	39	−3	21
8	FC Avenir Beggen	22	6	8	8	28	29	−1	20
9	Alliance Dudelange	22	7	6	9	36	39	−3	20
10	Stade Dudelange	22	5	8	9	27	31	−4	18
11	Union Luxembourg	22	5	7	10	20	35	−15	17
12	CS Fola Esch	22	2	4	16	14	58	−44	8

Source: rsssf.com

== Results ==
Home \ Away	AVE	ALD	ARI	CHI	ETZ	FOL	JEU	PRO	RBD	RUM	STD	UNI
Avenir Beggen		1–1	0–2	3–0	2–3	5–0	0–2	1–0	1–1	1–1	1–1	2–0
Alliance Dudelange	1–1		1–0	0–2	2–3	6–1	0–3	1–1	3–2	1–3	1–1	2–2
Aris Bonnevoie	1–2	2–0		2–1	1–0	3–0	0–0	2–2	0–2	0–3	0–0	3–2
Chiers Rodange	2–1	2–3	0–3		1–2	2–1	0–1	2–0	2–4	2–2	3–1	2–2
Etzella Ettelbruck	1–3	2–1	0–5	1–1		5–0	4–0	4–0	0–2	1–3	2–1	6–0
Fola Esch	3–0	0–2	1–0	0–4	2–2		0–0	0–4	1–3	0–0	0–4	0–1
Jeunesse Esch	1–1	3–0	5–2	4–1	2–0	6–1		2–5	5–3	2–2	1–0	2–1
Progrès Niederkorn	1–0	3–2	1–0	0–4	1–0	3–2	1–2		0–1	2–2	1–0	2–2
Red Boys Differdange	3–3	1–2	2–0	5–0	1–1	1–1	1–1	7–1		0–1	2–1	1–1
Rumelange	4–0	2–0	1–4	0–1	0–0	2–0	0–2	2–0	0–1		3–1	0–1
Stade Dudelange	1–0	4–4	0–1	4–2	1–1	2–0	2–2	1–0	0–2	1–1		0–3
Union Luxembourg	0–0	0–3	0–0	0–2	0–1	3–1	0–4	0–2	0–1	1–0	1–1	

Legend: Blue = home team win; Yellow = draw; Red = away team win.
