= 1934–35 Luxembourg National Division =

Luxembourg National Division
- Season: 1934–35
- Champions: CA Spora Luxembourg (5th title)
- Matches: 56
- Goals: 230 (4.11 per match)
- Highest scoring: US Dudelange 2–8 FA Red Boys Differdange

The 1934–35 Luxembourg National Division was the 25th season of top level association football in Luxembourg.

== Overview ==
It was contested by 8 teams, and CA Spora Luxembourg won the championship.

== League standings ==
Pos	Team	Pld	W	D	L	GF	GA	GD	Pts
1	CA Spora Luxembourg	14	9	2	3	33	15	+18	20
2	FA Red Boys Differdange	14	8	1	5	40	27	+13	17
3	Jeunesse Esch	14	6	2	6	27	24	+3	14
4	US Dudelange	14	6	2	6	35	40	−5	14
5	FC Red Black Pfaffenthal	14	4	5	5	21	23	−2	13
6	Union Luxembourg	14	5	3	6	27	31	−4	13
7	FC Aris Bonnevoie	14	5	1	8	27	39	−12	11
8	FC Progrès Niedercorn	14	4	2	8	20	31	−11	10

Source: rsssf.com

== Results ==
Home \ Away	ARI	USD	JEU	PRO	RBP	RBD	SPO	UNI
Aris Bonnevoie		2–2	2–0	3–1	5–0	0–4	2–3	2–4
US Dudelange	2–3		4–3	3–0	1–1	2–8	2–1	6–1
Jeunesse Esch	4–2	7–1		3–1	2–0	2–0	0–0	1–2
Progrès Niederkorn	1–3	5–2	2–0		1–1	1–4	0–2	3–1
Red Black Pfaffenthal	4–1	4–1	1–1	2–1		3–4	0–1	0–0
Red Boys Differdange	3–0	1–5	4–1	1–2	2–1		1–3	5–2
Spora Luxembourg	6–1	3–1	4–1	4–0	1–2	2–2		3–2
Union Luxembourg	5–1	1–3	1–2	2–2	2–2	3–1	1–0	

Legend: Blue = home team win; Yellow = draw; Red = away team win.
