= 1932–33 Luxembourg National Division =

Luxembourg National Division
- Season: 1932–33
- Champions: FA Red Boys Differdange (5th title)
- Matches: 56
- Goals: 222 (3.96 per match)
- Highest scoring: FA Red Boys Differdange 12–0 US Dudelange

The 1932–33 Luxembourg National Division was the 23rd season of top level association football in Luxembourg.

== Overview ==
It was contested by eight teams, and FA Red Boys Differdange won the championship.

== League standings ==
Pos	Team	Pld	W	D	L	GF	GA	GD	Pts
1	FA Red Boys Differdange	14	13	1	0	61	8	+53	27
2	CA Spora Luxembourg	14	7	2	5	37	34	+3	16
3	FC Progrès Niedercorn	14	7	1	6	20	23	−3	15
4	National Schifflange	14	5	3	6	23	19	+4	13
5	CS Fola Esch	14	6	1	7	24	36	−12	13
6	Union Luxembourg	14	5	2	7	28	27	+1	12
7	US Dudelange	14	4	3	7	18	37	−19	11
8	FC Red Black Pfaffenthal	14	1	3	10	11	38	−27	5

Source: rsssf.com

== Results ==
Home \ Away	USD	FOL	NAT	PRO	RBP	RBD	SPO	UNI
US Dudelange		3–1	0–1	0–2	1–1	1–4	2–0	3–2
Fola Esch	2–0		1–1	4–0	2–0	2–7	1–3	3–1
National Schifflange	2–3	1–2		6–0	3–1	1–1	1–2	5–2
Progrès Niederkorn	0–0	5–0	0–1		2–1	0–2	1–5	1–0
Red Black Pfaffenthal	5–2	0–3	1–1	0–3		0–4	0–2	0–2
Red Boys Differdange	12–0	4–0	2–0	1–0	6–1		3–1	3–1
Spora Luxembourg	2–2	7–3	2–0	1–3	7–1	0–9		3–3
Union Luxembourg	3–1	4–0	2–0	2–3	0–0	1–3	5–2	

Legend: Blue = home team win; Yellow = draw; Red = away team win.
