= 1925–26 Luxembourg National Division =

Luxembourg National Division
- Season: 1925–26
- Champions: FA Red Boys Differdange (2nd title)
- Matches: 56
- Goals: 260 (4.64 per match)
- Highest scoring: US Esch 1–11 FA Red Boys Differdange

The 1925–26 Luxembourg National Division was the 16th season of top level association football in Luxembourg.

== Overview ==
It was performed in seven teams, and FA Red Boys Differdange won the championship.

== League standings ==
Pos	Team	Pld	W	D	L	GF	GA	GD	Pts
1	FA Red Boys Differdange	14	11	0	3	52	23	+29	22
2	CA Spora Luxembourg	14	10	1	3	27	21	+6	21
3	CS Fola Esch	14	9	0	5	30	22	+8	18
4	Jeunesse Esch	14	7	1	6	31	24	+7	15
5	Union Luxembourg	14	7	0	7	36	24	+12	14
6	FC Red Black Pfaffenthal	14	4	3	7	17	26	−9	11
7	Stade Dudelange	14	2	2	10	31	43	−12	6
8	US Esch-sur-Alzette	14	1	3	10	17	58	−41	5

Source: rsssf.com

== Results ==
Home \ Away	USE	FOL	JEU	RBP	RBD	SPO	STD	UNI
US Esch		1–2	1–3	1–1	1–11	0–1	4–2	3–7
Fola Esch	3–0		2–1	3–1	2–4	2–4	5–1	2–1
Jeunesse Esch	1–1	2–1		0–1	5–2	1–2	2–0	0–3
Red Black Pfaffenthal	3–1	1–4	3–6		0–1	2–3	1–1	1–3
Red Boys Differdange	7–0	2–0	0–5	2–0		2–3	4–2	4–2
Spora Luxembourg	0–0	2–0	2–0	1–2	0–6		5–1	1–0
Stade Dudelange	9–2	1–2	4–5	0–0	2–5	2–3		4–2
Union Luxembourg	8–2	1–2	2–0	0–1	1–2	3–0	3–2	

Legend: Blue = home team win; Yellow = draw; Red = away team win.
