= 1933–34 Luxembourg National Division =

Luxembourg National Division
- Season: 1933–34
- Champions: CA Spora Luxembourg (4th title)
- Matches: 56
- Goals: 217 (3.88 per match)
- Highest scoring: US Dudelange 11–1 CS Fola Esch

The 1933–34 Luxembourg National Division was the 24th season of top level association football in Luxembourg.

== Overview ==
It was contested by eight teams, and CA Spora Luxembourg won the championship.

== League standings ==
Pos	Team	Pld	W	D	L	GF	GA	GD	Pts
1	CA Spora Luxembourg	14	11	1	2	43	21	+22	23
2	FA Red Boys Differdange	14	8	2	4	43	23	+20	18
3	US Dudelange	14	5	4	5	37	29	+8	14
4	Union Luxembourg	14	5	3	6	19	28	−9	13
5	Jeunesse Esch	14	4	5	5	21	33	−12	13
6	FC Progrès Niedercorn	14	4	4	6	22	23	−1	12
7	National Schifflange	14	2	7	5	18	27	−9	11
8	CS Fola Esch	14	3	2	9	14	33	−19	8

Source: rsssf.com

== Results ==
Home \ Away	USD	FOL	JEU	NAT	PRO	RBD	SPO	UNI
US Dudelange		11–1	5–1	1–1	1–1	4–3	1–6	5–0
Fola Esch	1–3		0–0	1–0	2–1	2–0	2–3	2–3
Jeunesse Esch	1–1	2–1		1–1	3–1	2–2	1–3	2–1
National Schifflange	2–2	4–0	3–4		1–0	0–5	1–1	2–2
Progrès Niederkorn	5–0	0–0	5–0	0–0		3–2	0–4	1–1
Red Boys Differdange	2–1	3–1	6–1	3–3	3–1		4–1	4–0
Spora Luxembourg	4–2	2–1	3–2	6–0	1–2	4–2		2–1
Union Luxembourg	1–0	1–0	1–1	1–0	5–2	0–4	2–3	

Legend: Blue = home team win; Yellow = draw; Red = away team win.
