= 1978–79 Luxembourg National Division =

Luxembourg National Division
- Season: 1978–79

The 1978–79 Luxembourg National Division was the 65th season of top level association football in Luxembourg.

== Overview ==
It was performed in 12 teams, and FA Red Boys Differdange won the championship.

== League standings ==
Pos	Team	Pld	W	D	L	GF	GA	GD	Pts
1	FA Red Boys Differdange	22	14	6	2	60	19	+41	34
2	FC Progrès Niedercorn	22	13	8	1	61	25	+36	34
3	Union Luxembourg	22	11	3	8	56	32	+24	25
4	FC Avenir Beggen	22	7	10	5	35	27	+8	24
5	Jeunesse Esch	22	9	6	7	35	34	+1	24
6	FC Etzella Ettelbruck	22	8	6	8	43	48	−5	22
7	FC Aris Bonnevoie	22	7	6	9	24	46	−22	20
8	CS Grevenmacher	22	6	7	9	23	33	−10	19
9	Chiers Rodange	22	9	1	12	30	48	−18	19
10	US Rumelange	22	5	8	9	22	29	−7	18
11	Alliance Dudelange	22	5	7	10	20	32	−12	17
12	FCM Young Boys Diekirch	22	3	2	17	28	64	−36	8

Source: rsssf.com

== Results ==
Home \ Away	ALD	ARI	AVE	CHI	ETZ	GRE	JEU	PRO	RBD	RUM	UNI	YBD
Alliance Dudelange		0–0	1–1	0–1	0–0	1–0	1–3	1–1	0–2	2–0	0–1	2–1
Aris Bonnevoie	2–1		1–1	3–2	2–4	3–2	1–1	0–3	0–4	1–0	2–8	0–2
Avenir Beggen	1–1	0–0		4–0	2–1	2–2	1–0	2–5	1–3	1–0	1–2	7–2
Chiers Rodange	1–0	3–1	1–3		0–3	1–3	1–2	0–4	0–2	0–3	1–0	2–1
Etzella Ettelbruck	4–3	1–2	1–1	3–4		0–2	2–0	2–2	3–3	4–3	2–1	3–2
Grevenmacher	0–1	0–1	0–0	2–0	1–1		3–0	2–2	0–3	0–0	1–1	2–0
Jeunesse Esch	1–1	0–0	1–1	2–3	3–1	4–0		3–1	1–1	1–0	0–5	4–2
Progrès Niederkorn	6–1	7–1	2–0	3–2	1–1	1–0	6–2		1–1	2–2	2–1	4–1
Red Boys Differdange	2–0	3–0	0–0	4–0	7–2	4–1	3–1	2–2		4–0	1–4	1–0
Rumelange	0–0	0–0	2–1	1–3	1–2	1–1	0–2	0–0	1–1		2–1	2–1
Union Luxembourg	2–0	1–3	0–3	3–3	5–2	7–0	0–3	0–3	2–1	1–1		6–0
Young Boys Diekirch	3–4	3–1	2–2	1–2	3–1	0–1	1–1	1–3	0–8	1–3	1–5	

Legend: Blue = home team win; Yellow = draw; Red = away team win.
