= 1930–31 Luxembourg National Division =

21st season of top flight football in Luxembourg

Luxembourg National Division
- Season: 1930–31
- Champions: FA Red Boys Differdange (3rd title)
- Matches: 56
- Goals: 253 (4.52 per match)
- Highest scoring: Spora Luxembourg 7–3 FC Progrès Niedercorn

The 1930–31 Luxembourg National Division was the 21st season of top level association football in Luxembourg.

== Overview ==
It was contested by eight teams, and FA Red Boys Differdange won the championship.

== League standings ==
Pos	Team	Pld	W	D	L	GF	GA	GD	Pts
1	FA Red Boys Differdange	14	12	1	1	54	12	+42	25
2	CA Spora Luxembourg	14	8	4	2	53	24	+29	20
3	FC Progrès Niedercorn	14	6	2	6	27	31	−4	14
4	CS Fola Esch	14	3	6	5	23	34	−11	12
5	Union Luxembourg	14	5	2	7	28	43	−15	12
6	National Schifflange	14	4	2	8	29	41	−12	10
7	Stade Dudelange	14	3	4	7	23	38	−15	10
8	FC Red Black Pfaffenthal	14	2	5	7	16	30	−14	9

Source: rsssf.com

== Results ==
Home \ Away	FOL	NAT	PRO	RBP	RBD	SPO	STD	UNI
Fola Esch		4–1	0–0	1–1	1–4	3–3	1–1	2–4
National Schifflange	2–2		3–1	1–3	0–2	4–1	4–3	3–2
Progrès Niederkorn	0–1	3–2		3–1	3–2	2–4	3–0	1–1
Red Black Pfaffenthal	1–1	4–1	0–1		0–5	1–3	1–1	0–3
Red Boys Differdange	5–1	6–1	5–2	3–0		2–1	3–0	5–2
Spora Luxembourg	7–0	5–3	7–3	2–2	1–1		6–2	8–0
Stade Dudelange	2–1	2–2	4–2	4–1	0–5	1–1		1–2
Union Luxembourg	3–5	3–2	1–3	1–1	0–6	0–4	6–2	

Legend: Blue = home team win; Yellow = draw; Red = away team win.
