= Mickaël Jager =

French footballer (born 1989)

Personal information
- Date of birth: 13 February 1989 (age 37)
- Place of birth: Saint-Avold, France
- Height: 1.79 m (5 ft 10 in)
- Position: Forward

Team information
- Current team: FC Mamer 32

Youth career
- SR Creutzwald

Senior career*
Years	Team	Apps	(Gls)
2012–2014	FC Résidence Walferdange		
2014–19	FC UNA Strassen		
2019-	FC Mamer 32		
- * Club domestic league appearances and goals

Mickaël Jager (born 13 January 1989) is a French footballer who plays as a striker for FC Mamer 32.

== Early life ==
Jager started his career with French side SR Creutzwald 03, helping the club achieve promotion.

== Career ==
In 2012, Jager signed for Luxembourgish side Walferdange, where he was regarded as one of the club's most important players. He helped the club achieve promotion. In 2014, he signed for Luxembourgish side FC UNA Strassen, where he was regarded as one of the club's most important players. He played once as goalkeeper for them. In 2019, he signed for Luxembourgish side FC Mamer 32, where he captained the club.

== Style of play ==
Jager mainly operates as a striker and is known for his strength.

== Personal life ==
Jager has worked as a physiotherapist.
