= Stade du Thillenberg =

Football stadium in Differdange, Luxembourg

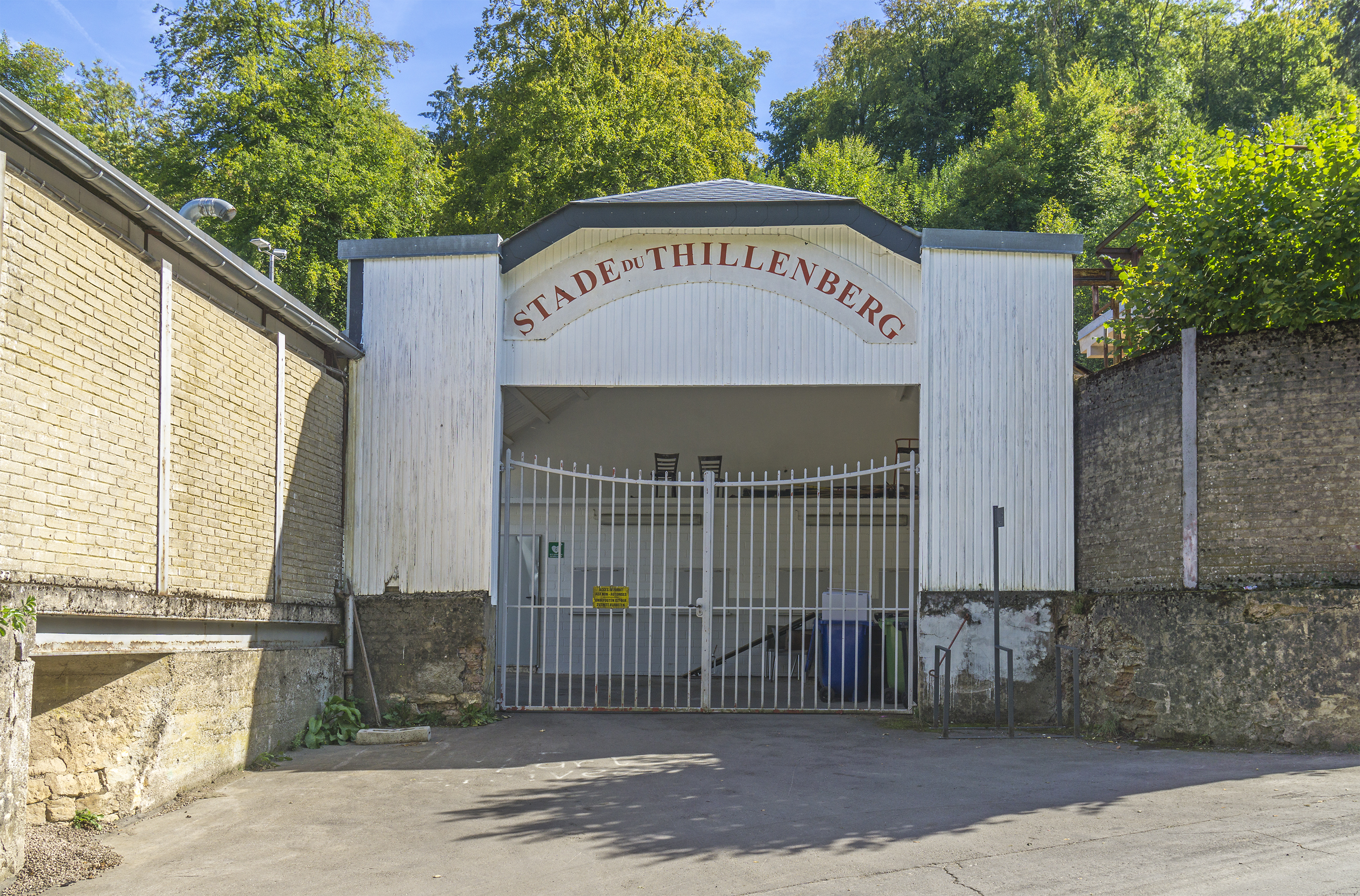
- Stade du Thillenberg, Differdange, Luxembourg
- Interactive map of Stade du Thillenberg
- Full name: Stade du Thillenberg
- Location: Differdange, Luxembourg
- Coordinates: 49.5222°N 5.8755°E
- Capacity: 6,300
- Surface: grass

Tenant
- FC Differdange 03

Stade du Thillenberg is a football stadium in Differdange, in south-western Luxembourg. It is currently the home stadium of FC Differdange 03. Until 2003, it was the home of Red Boys Differdange. The stadium has a capacity of 6,300 people.

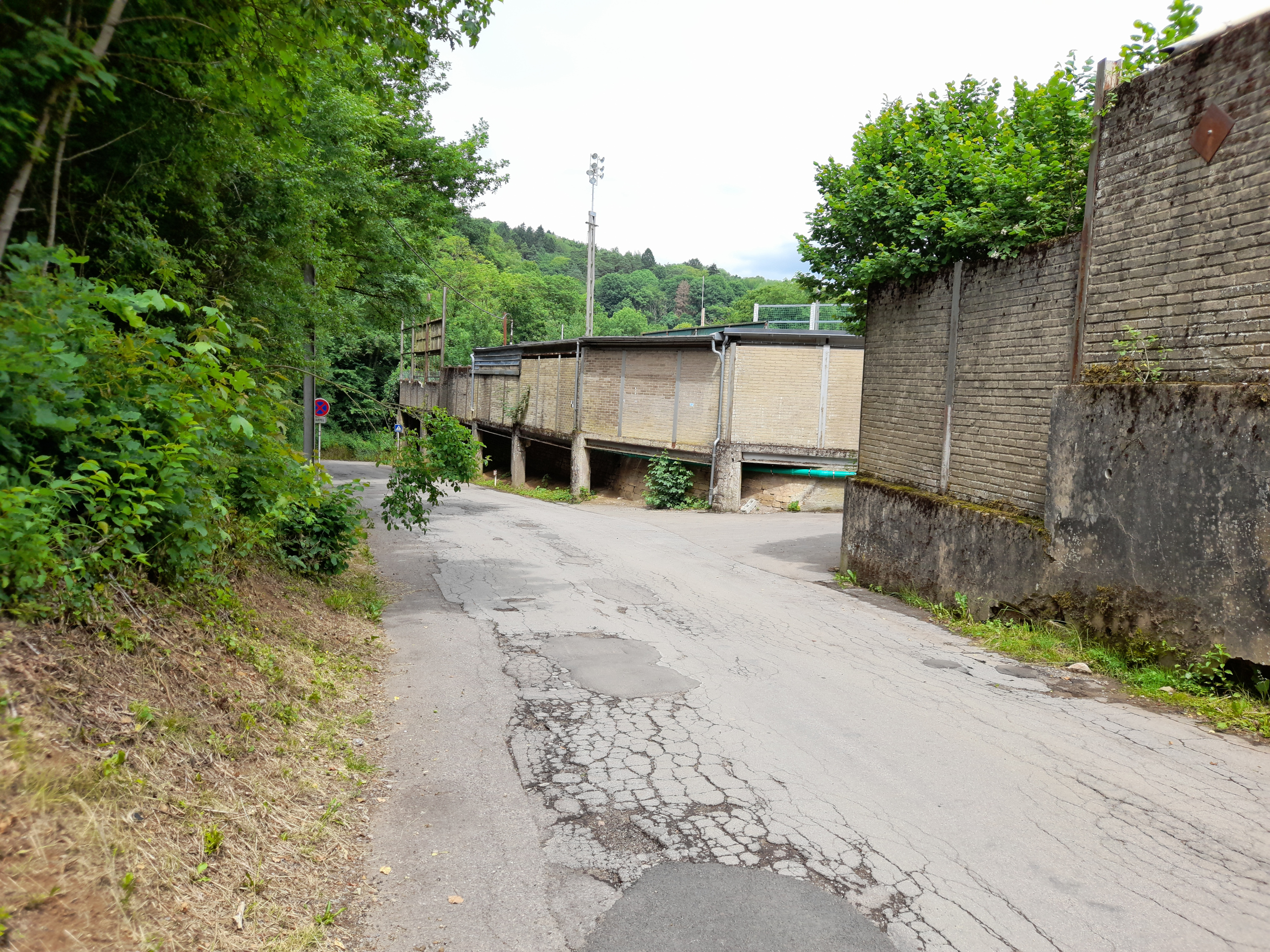
Behind the stand
