= FA Red Boys Differdange =

Defunct association football club in Luxembourg

Red Boys Differdange
- Full name: Football Association; Red Boys Differdange
- Nickname: Red Boys
- Founded: 1907
- Dissolved: 2003
- Ground: Stade du Thillenberg, Differdange
- Capacity: 6,300
- 2002–03: Promotion d'Honneur, 11th
Home colours

Football Association Red Boys Differdange was a football club, based in Differdange, in south-western Luxembourg. It is now a part of FC Differdange 03.

== History ==
Red Boys was founded as SC Differdange in 1907, the year after Luxembourg's first club, Fola Esch, had been set up. Despite the clubs provenance, its first appearance in Luxembourg's league as Red Boys Differdange came only in 1919 (and, then, only in the second division). Soon, though, Red Boys would embark upon the greatest runs of success in Luxembourgish football.

During the 1920s and 1930s, Red Boys competed with Spora Luxembourg for dominance of Luxembourgish football. Red Boys was the more successful of the two, and won thirteen trophies in as many years between 1923 and 1936. Despite the staunch competition (Spora won 8 trophies in the same period), this record has never been matched. Despite fading after the Second World War, Red Boys remained one of the largest and most successful teams in Luxembourgish football. Differdange's record was most impressive in the Luxembourg Cup, which the club won more times than any other team (15).

In 2003, the club merged with city rivals AS Differdange to become FC Differdange 03.

== Honours ==
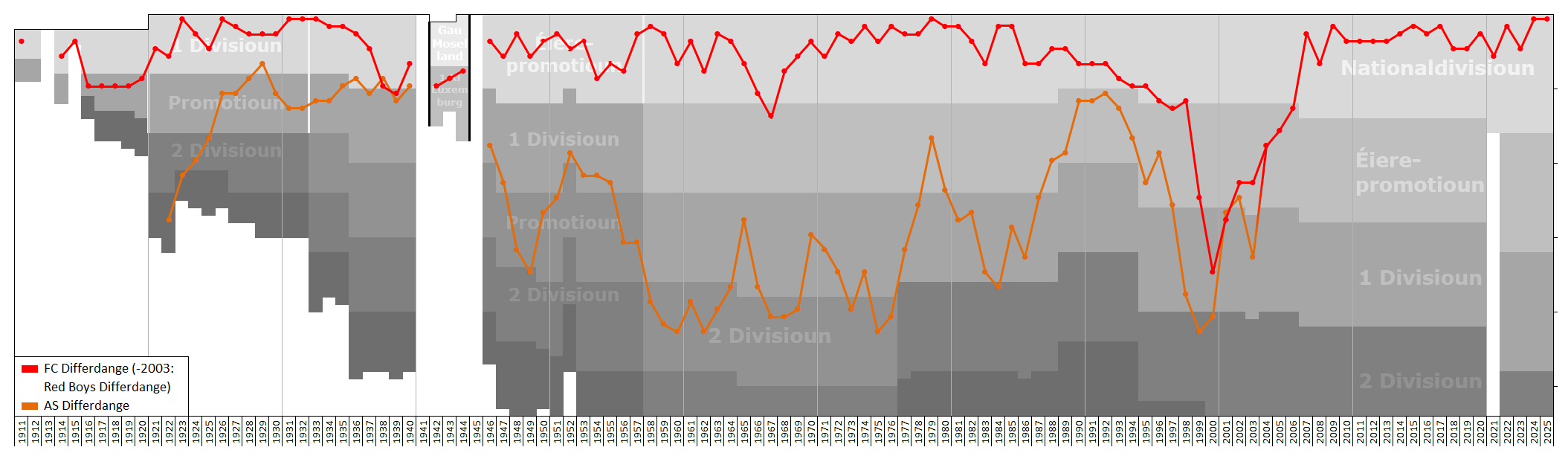
Historical league performance chart of Red Boys Differdange

- National Division
  - Winners (6): 1922–23, 1925–26, 1930–31, 1931–32, 1932–33, 1978–79
  - Runners-up (10): 1926–27, 1933–34, 1934–35, 1957–58, 1973–74, 1975–76, 1979–80, 1980–81, 1983–84, 1984–85
- Luxembourg Cup
  - Winners (15): 1924–25, 1925–26, 1926–27, 1928–29, 1929–30, 1930–31, 1933–34, 1935–36, 1951–52, 1952–53, 1957–58, 1971–72, 1978–79, 1981–82, 1984–85
  - Runners-up (9): 1923–24, 1931–32, 1934–35, 1947–48, 1949–50, 1954–55, 1969–70, 1976–77, 1985–86

== European competition ==
Red Boys Differdange qualified for UEFA European competition ten times, but never progressed past the first tie in any European competition. The club won one match in Europe, winning their 1979–80 European Cup European Cup first leg 2–1 against Omonia Nicosia before losing 6–1 in Cyprus. In the 1984–85 UEFA Cup, Red Boys managed a surprise goalless draw with giants Ajax, but was crushed 14–0 in the return (which remains a UEFA Cup record).

Overall, Red Boys Differdange's record in European competition reads:

Competition	P	W	D	L	F	A
European Cup	2	1	0	1	3	7
UEFA Cup	12	0	1	11	3	68
Cup Winners' Cup	6	0	0	6	2	28
Total	20	1	1	18	8	103

Season	Competition	Round	Opponent	1st Leg	2nd Leg	Agg
1972–73 Cup Winners' Cup		R1	(Italy) Milan	1–4 (H)	0–3 (A)	1–7
1974–75 UEFA Cup		R1	(France) Lyon	0–7 (A)	1–4 (H)	1–11
1976–77 UEFA Cup		R1	(Belgium) SC Lokeren	0–3 (H)	1–3 (A)	1–6
1977–78 UEFA Cup		R1	(Netherlands) AZ Alkmaar	1–11 (A)	0–5 (H)	1–16
1979–80 European Cup		R1	(Cyprus) Omonia	2–1 (H)	1–6 (A)	3–7
1980–81 UEFA Cup		R1	(Netherlands) AZ	0–6 (A)	0–4 (H)	0–10
1981–82 UEFA Cup		R1	Sporting Clube de Portugal	0–4 (A)	0–7 (H)	0–11
1982–83 Cup Winners' Cup		R1	(Belgium) Waterschei Thor	1–7 (A)	0–1 (H)	1–8
1984–85 UEFA Cup		R1	(Netherlands) Ajax	0–0 (H)	0–14 (A)	0–14
1985–86 Cup Winners' Cup		R1	(Sweden) AIK	0–8 (A)	0–5 (H)	0–13
