= CA Spora Luxembourg =

Defunct association football club in Luxembourg

Spora
- Full name: CA Spora Luxembourg
- Founded: 1923
- Dissolved: 2005 (merged)
- Ground: Stade Josy Barthel, Luxembourg City
- Capacity: 8,054
- 2004–05: National Division, 10th of 12

CA Spora Luxembourg was a football club, based in Luxembourg City, in southern Luxembourg. It is now a part of Racing FC Union Luxembourg.

== History ==
Spora was founded in 1923 as an amalgam of Racing Club Luxembourg and Sporting Club Luxembourg, two of the leading lights of early Luxembourgish football. For the first seventeen years of existence, Spora would battle with FA Red Boys Differdange for ultimate ascendancy in Luxembourgish football. Although Red Boys won more trophies in this period, Spora picked up almost every piece of silverware that Red Boys didn't, with seven league titles and three Luxembourg Cups in just fifteen years.

During the German occupation of Luxembourg, the club played in the Gauliga Moselland under the name of Moselland Luxemburg.

After the Second World War, Spora continued to win titles (albeit less frequently than before). To its pre-war haul, the club added four more championships and won the Luxembourg Cup another five times. In 1956, Spora recorded one of the most celebrated European club results in Luxembourgish history, as it beat the West German champions, Borussia Dortmund.

In 2005, Spora merged with two other clubs from Luxembourg City, CS Alliance 01 and Union Luxembourg, to form Spora's modern incarnation, Racing FC Union Luxembourg.

== Colours ==
The club colours were blue and yellow, in various combinations; for example, blue with a yellow hoop in the 1950s, and blue and yellow stripes in the 1990s.

== Honours ==
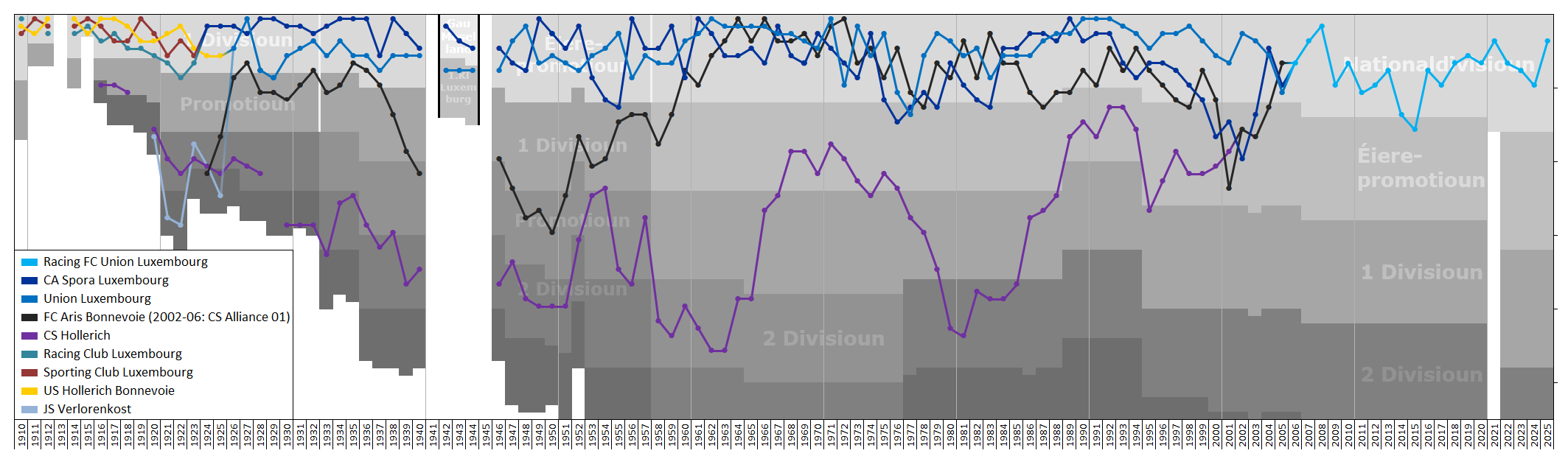
Historical league performance chart of Racing FC Union Luxembourg and its predecessors, including Spora Luxembourg

- National Division
  - Winners (11): 1924–25, 1927–28, 1928–29, 1933–34, 1934–35, 1935–36, 1937–38, 1948–49, 1955–56, 1960–61, 1988–89
  - Runners-up (10): 1923–24, 1925–26, 1929–30, 1930–31, 1932–33, 1944–45, 1951–52, 1958–59, 1966–67, 1987–88
- Luxembourg Cup
  - Winners (8): 1927–28, 1931–32, 1939–40, 1949–50, 1956–57, 1964–65, 1965–66, 1979–80
  - Runners-up (8): 1924–25, 1928–29, 1929–30, 1930–31, 1933–34, 1944–45, 1962–63, 1986–87

=== As Racing Club Luxembourg ===
- National Division
  - Winners (1): 1909–10
- Luxembourg Cup
  - Winners (1): 1921–22

=== As Sporting Club Luxembourg ===
- National Division
  - Winners (2): 1910–11, 1918–19
  - Runners-up (3): 1911–12, 1913–14, 1915–16

== European competitions ==
Spora qualified for UEFA European competition eleven times, winning twice. In 1956–57, the team surprisingly won the second leg of their tie against West German champions Borussia Dortmund 2–1, having lost the first leg 4–3 in Germany. Between the years of 1967-68 and 2021–22, when the away goals rule was used, Spora would have gone through. However, in 1956, a playoff match was used, and Spora were dispatched 7–0. Spora's second victory was in the 1964–65 Inter-Cities Fairs Cup, when it won its second leg against FC Basel 1–0, but went out nonetheless, having lost the first leg 2–0.

Competition	P	W	D	L	F	A
European Cup	7	1	0	6	7	36
UEFA Cup (Note: Includes Inter-Cities Fairs Cup)	10	1	0	9	6	49
Cup Winners' Cup	6	0	0	6	2	23
Total	23	2	0	21	15	108

=== Matches ===
Season	Competition	Round (Note: PR: Preliminary Round; R1: 1st Round)	Opponent	1st Leg	2nd Leg	Agg	Playoff
1956–57 European Cup		PR	(West Germany) Borussia Dortmund	3–4 (A)	2–1 (H)	5–5	0–7 (A)
1961–62 European Cup		PR	(Denmark) Boldklubben 1913	0–6 (H)	2–9 (A)	2–15	
1964–65 Inter-Cities Fairs Cup		R1	(Switzerland) Basel	0–2 (A)	1–0 (H)	1–2	
1965–66 Cup Winners' Cup		R1	(East Germany) 1. FC Magdeburg	0–1 (A)	0–2 (H)	0–3	
1966–67 Cup Winners' Cup		R1	(Republic of Ireland) Shamrock Rovers	1–4 (A)	1–4 (H)	2–8	
1967–68 Inter-Cities Fairs Cup		R1	(England) Leeds United	0–9 (H)	0–7 (A)	0–16	
1980–81 Cup Winners' Cup		R1	(Czech Republic) Sparta Prague	0–6 (H)	0–6 (A)	0–12	
1987–88 UEFA Cup		R1	(Netherlands) Feyenoord	0–5 (A)	2–5 (H)	2–10	
1989–90 European Cup		R1	(Spain) Real Madrid	0–3 (H)	0–6 (A)	0–9	
1991–92 UEFA cup		R1	(Germany) Eintracht Frankfurt	1–6 (A)	0–5 (H)	1–11	
1992–93 UEFA Cup		R1	(England) Sheffield Wednesday	1–8 (A)	1–2 (H)	2–10	

== Managers ==
- (Austria) Josef Frühwirth (1938)
- (Austria) Willi Macho (1955–57)
- (Hungary) András Béres (1960–62)
- (Luxembourg) Carlo Weis (1987–88)
- (Poland) Wieslaw Chadakowski (1989–90)
- (Germany) Heinz Eimer (1991–92)
- (Luxembourg) Jean Fiedler (1992–93)
- (France) François Zdun (1993–97)
- (Albania) Florim Alijaj (2001–02)
- (Germany) Heinz Eimer (2002–04)
- (France) Jean Sabbatucci (2004)
- (France) Alain Happe (2004–05)
- (Belgium) Bernard Wégria (2005)
