= List of German people of Moroccan descent =

This is a list of individuals of Moroccan ancestry who grew up and/or live in Germany.

== Athletes ==
=== Combat sport ===
- Ottman Azaitar
- Chalid Arrab
- Nordin Asrih
- Nadia Raoui

=== Football ===
- Karim Bellarabi
- Aziz Bouhaddouz
- Abdelhamid Sabiri
- Aymen Barkok
- Elias Abouchabaka
- Samir Benamar
- Mimoun Azaouagh
- Anas Ouahim
- Adil Chihi
- Mohamed El Bouazzati
- Hamadi Al Ghaddioui
- Mohamed Amsif
- Manuel Schmiedebach
- Mohamed Morabet
- Fikri El Haj Ali
- Rachid El Hammouchi
- Nasir El Kasmi
- Fouad Brighache
- Nassim Boujellab
- Abdelaziz Ahanfouf
- Ahmed Azaouagh
- Elias Oubella
- Elias Tamim
- Mohamed El Bakali
- Elias Kurt

=== Others ===
- Sanaa Koubaa - runner
- Yassin Idbihi - former basketball player

== Musicians ==
=== Rappers ===
- Farid Bang
- Juju
- Abdi
- Miami Yacine
- Dú Maroc
- Soufian
- Reda Rwena
- Ramo
- Capkekz
- Sami
- A.B.K
- MC Rene
- Yassir
- Mo Douzi
- Mourad Kill

=== Rappers & singers ===
- Namika
- Yasin El Harrouk

=== Singers ===
- Nadja Benaissa
- Senna Gammour
- Bibi Bourelly
- Janina El Arguioui - DSDS-Finalist 2018

== Comedians ==
- Abdelkarim
- Benaissa Lamroubal
- Khalid Bounouar
- Salim Samatou
- Mohamed Sartiane („Momonews“)

== Actors ==
- Yasin El Harrouk alias Yonii (also musician)
- Nisma Cherrat
- Emilio Sakraya
- Yasmina Filali
- Hicham Lahsoussi
- Samira El Ouassil

== Media & TV ==
- Souad Mekhennet (Moroccan father and Turkish mother)
- Siham El-Maimouni
- Mouhcine El Ghomri

== Politicians ==
- Samira El Ouassil
- Sanae Abdi

== Scientists ==
- Lamia Messari-Becker (Moroccan father and mother), civil engineer, professor
- Jalid Sehouli - gynaecologist & oncologist
- Nizar Ibrahim - vertebrate paleontologist

== Writers ==
- Mohamed Amjahid
- Nadia Doukali
- Mourad Alami

== Miscellaneous ==
- Abdelkader Salhi - serial killer

== See also ==
- Moroccans in Germany
- List of Moroccan people
- Moroccan diaspora
