= 2010–11 Luxembourg National Division =

BGL Ligue
- Season: 2010–11
- Champions: F91 Dudelange; 8th title
- Relegated: Wiltz; FC Etzella Ettelbruck; FC Jeunesse Canach
- Champions League: F91 Dudelange
- Europa League: CS Fola Esch; UN Käerjeng 97; FC Differdange 03
- Matches: 182
- Goals: 611 (3.36 per match)
- Biggest home win: Dudelange 15–0 Wiltz
- Biggest away win: four matches with a differential of four goals each
- Highest scoring: Dudelange 15–0 Wiltz

The 2010–11 Luxembourg National Division (also known as BGL Ligue due to sponsorship reasons) was the 97th season of top-tier football in Luxembourg. It began on 7 August 2010 and ended on 20 May 2011. Jeunesse Esch went into the season as the defending champions having won their 28th Luxembourgish championship during the 2009–10 season.

== Team changes from 2009–10 ==
Rumelange and Mondercange were relegated to the Division of Honour after finishing 13th and 14th in the previous season. They were replaced by 2009–10 Division of Honour champions Wiltz 71 and runners-up Jeunesse Canach.

Käerjéng 97 as 12th-placed team had to compete in a single play-off match against 3rd-placed Division of Honour side Oberkorn. Käerjéng 97 won the match 3–1 and thus retained their National Division status.

== Stadia and locations ==
Location of teams in 2010–11 Luxembourg National Division

Team	Venue	Capacity
FC Differdange 03	Stade du Thillenberg	7,830
F91 Dudelange	Stade Jos Nosbaum	2,600
FC Etzella Ettelbruck	Stade Am Deich	2,650
CS Fola Esch	Stade Émile Mayrisch	3,900
CS Grevenmacher	Op Flohr Stadion	4,000
FC Jeunesse Canach	Stade Rue de Lenningen	1,000
Jeunesse Esch	Stade de la Frontière	5,400
UN Käerjeng 97	Stade um Bëschel	1,000
CS Pétange	Stade Municipal (Pétange)	3,300
FC Progrès Niederkorn	Stade Jos Haupert	4,830
Racing FC Union Luxembourg	Stade Achille Hammerel	5,814
FC RM Hamm Benfica	Luxembourg-Cents	2,800
FC Swift Hesperange	Stade Alphonse Theis	3,058
FC Wiltz 71	Stade Géitz	2,000

== League table ==
Pos	Team	Pld	W	D	L	GF	GA	GD	Pts	Qualification or relegation
1	F91 Dudelange (C)	26	19	2	5	76	23	+53	59	Qualification to Champions League first qualifying round
2	Fola Esch	26	14	5	7	48	28	+20	47	Qualification to Europa League first qualifying round
3	UN Käerjeng 97	26	13	5	8	53	35	+18	44	Qualification to Europa League first qualifying round
4	Differdange 03	26	12	7	7	51	37	+14	43	Qualification to Europa League second qualifying round (Note: As winners of the 2010–11 Luxembourg Cup.)
5	Progrès Niederkorn	26	12	5	9	43	43	0	41	
6	Grevenmacher	26	11	6	9	43	39	+4	39	
7	Pétange	26	10	8	8	37	36	+1	38	
8	Jeunesse Esch	26	10	7	9	40	37	+3	37	
9	RM Hamm Benfica	26	11	3	12	47	46	+1	36	
10	Swift Hesperange	26	9	4	13	38	49	−11	31	
11	Racing FC	26	8	5	13	38	38	0	29	
12	Wiltz (R)	26	8	2	16	38	78	−40	26	Qualification to Relegation play-offs
13	Etzella Ettelbruck (R)	26	5	6	15	31	60	−29	21	Relegation to Luxembourg Division of Honour
14	Jeunesse Canach (R)	26	5	5	16	28	62	−34	20	Relegation to Luxembourg Division of Honour

Source: soccerway.com
Rules for classification: 1) points; 2) goal difference; 3) number of goals scored.
(C) Champions; (R) Relegated

== Results ==
Home \ Away	DIF	DUD	ETZ	FOL	GRE	JEC	JEU	KÄE	PET	PRO	RAC	RMH	SWI	WIL
Differdange 03		0–1	1–2	0–3	2–2	4–0	3–0	2–1	1–1	1–2	0–2	3–1	3–0	4–4
F91 Dudelange	3–4		4–1	3–0	0–3	2–0	2–0	1–2	3–0	5–1	3–2	4–2	2–0	15–0
Etzella Ettelbruck	2–2	1–1		1–2	0–4	1–1	0–0	0–1	0–2	2–2	2–3	2–2	2–3	1–3
Fola Esch	1–2	0–3	5–0		1–1	1–2	3–2	2–0	1–1	1–1	3–0	1–1	4–2	4–0
Grevenmacher	0–2	0–3	1–2	1–2		1–1	2–2	0–0	1–0	1–2	1–0	1–2	1–3	4–1
Jeunesse Canach	1–3	2–2	1–2	0–3	0–1		1–1	2–4	1–3	1–0	3–2	2–4	2–1	1–5
Jeunesse Esch	1–2	1–0	0–1	1–1	1–3	2–0		4–0	2–1	2–2	0–1	2–1	4–1	0–2
UN Käerjeng 97	2–2	1–3	6–1	1–2	5–1	5–0	1–1		0–0	3–4	1–1	1–0	4–1	5–1
Pétange	1–4	1–0	2–1	1–0	2–2	2–3	1–1	1–0		1–0	2–2	2–5	1–3	5–1
Progrès Niederkorn	2–4	1–5	3–2	2–1	1–3	2–0	1–3	2–1	1–2		1–0	5–2	2–0	0–1
Racing FC	1–1	0–2	5–1	0–2	0–1	4–2	4–1	1–3	0–2	0–0		0–1	0–0	1–3
RM Hamm Benfica	2–0	0–1	1–0	1–2	3–2	4–1	1–3	1–2	2–2	0–1	0–4		2–0	4–0
Swift Hesperange	0–0	0–3	4–2	0–2	2–3	2–0	1–2	2–3	0–0	2–2	2–1	4–2		2–1
Wiltz	2–1	1–5	1–2	2–1	2–3	1–1	2–4	0–1	2–1	0–3	1–4	1–3	1–3	

Source: soccerway.com
Legend: Blue = home team win; Yellow = draw; Red = away team win.

== Relegation play-offs ==
The 12th-placed club in the National Division, FC Wiltz 71, competed in a relegation play-off match against the third-placed team from the Division of Honour, US Hostert, for one spot in the following season's competition. Hostert won the match after a penalty shootout, thus winning promotion to the league for the first time in their history. Meanwhile, Wiltz 71 were relegated after one year in the league.

28 May 2011
17:00 CEST

US Hostert	1–1 (a.e.t.)	FC Wiltz 71
Penalties
	6–4

Stade rue Henri Dunant, Beggen

== Top goalscorers ==
Including matches played on 21 May 2011; Source: Soccerway

Rank	Player	Club	Goals
1	(Bosnia and Herzegovina) Sanel Ibrahimović	Wiltz	18
2	(Luxembourg) Daniel da Mota	F91 Dudelange	16
2	(Luxembourg) Aurélien Joachim	FC Differdange 03	16
2	(France) Romain Zewe	UN Käerjéng 97	16
5	(Poland) Tomasz Gruszczyński	F91 Dudelange	15
6	(France) Nicolas Caldieri	Progrès Niederkorn	14
6	(France) Samir Louadj	CS Grevenmacher	14
8	(France) Levy Rougeaux	Racing FC	12
8	(Morocco) Sofian Benzouien	F91 Dudelange	12
10	(Luxembourg) Djilali Kehal	RM Hamm Benfica	11
10	(Portugal) Johan Sampaio	Swift Hesperange	11
10	(Germany) Gustav Schulz	Swift Hesperange	11

== See also ==
- 2010–11 Luxembourg Cup
