= Nicolas Pauly =

Luxembourgish footballer

Personal information
- Date of birth: 19 November 1919
- Place of birth: Dudelange, Luxembourg
- Date of death: 25 August 1981 (aged 61)
- Place of death: Dudelange, Luxembourg

Senior career*
Years	Team	Apps	(Gls)
1945–1950	US Dudelange		
1957–1958	Alliance Dudelange		

International career
1945–1950	Luxembourg	21	(1)
- * Club domestic league appearances and goals

Nicolas Pauly (19 November 1919 – 25 August 1981) was a Luxembourgish footballer. He competed in the men's tournament at the 1948 Summer Olympics.
