= 2010–11 Luxembourg Cup =

Tournament details
- Country: Luxembourg

Final positions
- Champions: FC Differdange 03
- Runners-up: F91 Dudelange

The 2010–11 Luxembourg Cup was the 86th season of Luxembourg's annual cup competition. It began on 29 August 2010 with Round 1 and ended on 29 May 2011 with the Final held at a neutral venue. The winners of the competition will qualify for the second qualifying round of the 2011–12 UEFA Europa League. FC Differdange 03 are the defending champions, having won their first ever cup title last season.

== Calendar ==
Round	Date	Fixtures	New entrants
Round One	August 29, 2010	18	36
Round Two	September 5, 2010	16	14
Round Three	October 10, 2010	22	28
Round Four	November 7, 2010	18	14
Round Five	April 3, 2011	16	14
Round Six	April 22, 2011	8	–
Quarterfinals	May 4, 2011	4	–
Semifinals	May 24 and 25, 2011	2	–
Final	May 29, 2011	1	–

== Round 1 ==
Fifty teams from Division 2 (IV) and Division 3 (V) entered in this round. Thirty-six of them competed in matches, with the other fourteen teams were awarded a bye. The games were played on August 29. 2010.

Team 1	Score	Team 2
Résidence Walferdange	3–0	Excelsior Grevels
Jeunesse Junglinster	7–0	Red Boys Aspelt
FC Ehlerange	2–0	Blo-Weiss Medernach
Jeunesse Biwer	9–2	US Reisdorf
FC Rodange 91	7–0	US Moutfort/Medingen
Les Ardoisiers Perlé	0–5	CS Sanem
CS Bourscheid	2–1	Luna Obercorn
Vinesca Ehnen	2–1	Les Aiglons Dalheim
SC Ell	3–1	Racing Troisvierges
Red Star Merl/Belair	3–2 (a.e.t.)	AS Luxemburg/Porto
US Boevange/Attert	4–3	Jeunesse Sportive Koerich
Berdenia Berburg	10–0	Sporting Beckerich
Olympia Christmach/Waldbilling	2–1	Rupensia Lusitanos Larochette
Les Amis de la Moselle Remerschen	4–7	FC Noertzange HF
FC Red Black/Egalité 07	1–0	Claravallis Clervaux
ES Schouweiler	5–1	US Feulen
FC 47 Bastendorf	2–3	US Berdorf/Consdorf
Racing Heiderscheid/Eschdorf	0–6	Union Remich/Bous

Bye: Alisontia Steinsel, Blo-Weiss Itzig, FC Brouch, FC Lorentzweiler, FC Kopstal 33, Jeunesse Gilsdorf, Jeunesse Useldange, Kischpelt Wilwerwiltz, Minière Lasauvage, Syra Mensdorf, Titus Lamadelaine, US Folschette, US Rambrouch, Yellow Boys Weiler-la-Tour

== Round 2 ==
The eighteen winners of Round 1 and the fourteen teams that received a bye competed in this round. The games were played on September 5, 2010.

Team 1	Score	Team 2
FC Rodange 91	1–0	Red Star Merl/Belair
FC Red Black/Egalité 07	2–0	Syra Mensdorf
US Rambrouch	2–3	Jeunesse Biwer
Jeunesse Junglinster	5–2	Vinesca Ehnen
Minière Lasauvage	1–1 (a.e.t.); 5−6 (pen)	FC Kopstal 33
FC Noertzange HF	1–0	Yellow Boys Weiler-la-Tour
Alisontia Steinsel	1–2	FC Ehlerange
CS Bourscheid	8–1	Jeunesse Useldange
SC Ell	1–2	Résidence Walferdange
Berdenia Berburg	14–2	US Folschette
CS Sanem	3–0 (w/o)	Kischpelt Wilwerwiltz
Union Remich/Bous	0–4	FC Lorentzweiler
FC Brouch	3–2	Jeunesse Gilsdorf
US Berdorf/Consdorf	2–1	Blo-Weiss Itzig
ES Schouweiler	2–1	Titus Lamadelaine
Olympia Christnach/Waldbillig	3–0	US Boevange/Attert

== Round 3 ==
The sixteen winners of Round 2 will compete in this round, as well as twenty-eight teams from Division 1 (III), which enter the competition in this round. The games will be played on 10 October 2010.

Team 1	Score	Team 2
FC UNA Strassen	4–1	FC Ehlerange
FC Schifflingen 95	3–2	FC Munsbach
AS Hosingen	2–1	US Esch
Sporting Bettemburg	2–3	AS Colmar-Berg
FC Noertzange HF	2–1	ES Schouweiler
AS Wincrange	2–3	Sporting Mertzig
Atert Bissen	5–1	FC Kopstal 33
The Belval Belvaux	5–0	Jeunesse Biwer
ES Clemency	0–2	Tricolore Gasperich
Sporting Bertrange	2–3	Union Mertert/Wasserbillig
Jeunesse Junglinster	3–1	FC Lorentzweiler
Marisca Mersch	6–3	FC Brouch
US Sandweiler	2–3	CS Muhlenbach Lusitanos
FC Rodange 91	4–4 (a.e.t.); 8−6 (pen)	Daring Echternach
FC Pratzerthal/Rédange	0–1	Jeunesse Schieren
FF Norden 02	1–4	FC Flaxweiler/Beyren Udinesina
FC Kehlen	3–0	Alliance Aischdall Hobscheid/Eischen
Olympia Christnach/Waldbillig	1–2	US Berdorf/Consdorf
FC Cebra 01	1–2	CS Sanem
Berdenia Berburg	4–2	FC Red Black/Egalité 07
Résidence Walferdange	4–5	FC Mamer 32
CS Bourscheid	2–0	Orania Vianden

== Round 4 ==
The twenty-two winners of Round 3 will compete in this round, as well as fourteen teams from the Division of Honour (II), which enter the competition in this round. The games will be played on 7 November 2010.

Team 1	Score	Team 2
FC Koeppchen Wormeldange	2–4	US Rumelange
US Berdorf/Consdorf	1–4	The Belval Belvaux
CS Bourscheid	0–2	Jeunesse Junglinster
CS Sanem	3–1	Young Boys Diekirch
AS Colmar-Berg	2–4	SC Steinfort
FC Green Boys 77 Harlange-Tarchamps	0–1	Union Mertert/Wasserbillig
Union 05 Kayl-Tétange	9–0	Tricolore Gasperich
FC Avenir Beggen	5–3 (a.e.t.)	FC Erpeldange 72
FC Minerva Lintgen	0–2	Jeunesse Schieren
CS Muhlenbach Lusitanos	3–2	FC Schifflingen 95
Berdenia Berburg	0–3	FC Mamer 32
CS Oberkorn	1–2	FC Kehlen
FC Victoria Rosport	0–0 (a.e.t.); 5−7 (pen)	FC Flaxweiler/Beyren Udinesina
Sporting Mertzig	2–0	FC Noertzange HF
US Hostert	5–0	AS Hosingen
FC Mondercange	2–0	FC Rodange 91
Atert Bissen	4–5	FC UNA Strassen
US Mondorf-les-Bains	5–2	Marisca Mersch

== Round 5 ==
The eighteen winners of Round 4 will compete in this round, as well as the fourteen teams from the National Division, which enter the competition in this round. The games will be played on 3 April 2011.

Team 1	Score	Team 2
CS Sanem	0–2	FC Jeunesse Canach
US Mondorf-les-Bains	2–2 (a.e.t.); 2−5 (pen)	FC Progrès Niedercorn
Jeunesse Junglinster	0–2	CS Fola Esch
FC UNA Strassen	0–1 (a.e.t.)	F91 Dudelange
US Hostert	3–5	FC RM Hamm Benfica
Jeunesse Schieren	2–4 (a.e.t.)	FC Differdange 03
Sporting Mertzig	0–3	FC Swift Hesperange
FC Mondercange	0–3	FC Etzella Ettelbruck
FC Avenir Beggen	0–3	Racing FC Union Luxembourg
FC Flaxweiler/Beyren Udinesina	3–3 (a.e.t.); 6−5 (pen)	CS Pétange
FC Mamer 32	1–3	CS Grevenmacher
Union 05 Kayl-Tétange	1–0	CS Muhlenbach Lusitanos
The Belval Belvaux	0–1	US Rumelange
FC Kehlen	1–6	UN Käerjéng 97
Union Mertert/Wasserbillig	0–1	Jeunesse Esch
SC Steinfort	3–1	FC Wiltz 71

== Round 6 ==
The sixteen winners of Round 5 compete in this round. The games will be played on 22 April 2011.

Team 1	Score	Team 2
FC Flaxweiler/Beyren Udinesina	1–2 (a.e.t.)	Union 05 Kayl-Tétange
FC Etzella Ettelbruck	1–2	CS Fola Esch
FC Progrès Niedercorn	2–3 (a.e.t.)	Racing FC Union Luxembourg
UN Käerjéng 97	0–2	CS Grevenmacher
FC Differdange 03	3–1	FC RM Hamm Benfica
F91 Dudelange	2–1	FC Swift Hesperange
US Rumelange	0–2	FC Jeunesse Canach
SC Steinfort	1–4	Jeunesse Esch

== Quarter-finals ==
The eight winners from Round 6 will compete in the quarterfinals, to be held on 4 May 2011.

Team 1	Score	Team 2
CS Fola Esch	1–2	F91 Dudelange
FC Differdange 03	5–0	FC Jeunesse Canach
Union 05 Kayl-Tétange	1–4	Jeunesse Esch
Racing FC Union Luxembourg	4–1	CS Grevenmacher

== Semi-finals ==
The four quarterfinal winners will compete in the semifinals, to be held on 24 and 25 May 2011.

Team 1	Score	Team 2
Jeunesse Esch	0–2	F91 Dudelange
Racing FC Union Luxembourg	0–2	FC Differdange 03

== Final ==
29 May 2011
17:00 CEST

F91 Dudelange	0–1	FC Differdange 03
		Ribeiro 24'

Stade Josy Barthel, Luxembourg City
Attendance: 2,713
Referee: Frank Bourgnon
