= Abdelkader Salhi =

Abdelkader Salhi may refer to:

- Abdelkader Salhi (footballer)
- Abdelkader Salhi (serial killer)
