= Cirulli =

Cirulli is an Italian surname. Notable people with the surname include:

- Giuseppina Cirulli (born 1959), Italian hurdler
- Monica Cirulli (born 1982), Italian synchronized swimmer

== See also ==
- Cirelli
