= Samir Louadj =

French footballer (born 1985)

Personal information
- Full name: Samir Louadj
- Date of birth: 9 December 1985 (age 40)
- Place of birth: Forbach, France
- Height: 1.73 m (5 ft 8 in)
- Position: Midfielder

Team information
- Current team: CS Grevenmacher
- Number: 10

Youth career
- –2000: FC Metz
- 2000–2002: FC Nantes
- 2002–2003: US Forbach
- 2003–2004: SV Eintracht Trier 05

Senior career*
Years	Team	Apps	(Gls)
2004–2006	SV Eintracht Trier 05	19	(1)
2006–2007	US Forbach	20	(16)
2007–2008	F91 Dudelange	15	(6)
2008–2010	US Forbach	15	(6)
2010–	CS Grevenmacher	48	(24)
- * Club domestic league appearances and goals as of 9 September 2012

Samir Louadj (born 9 December 1985 in Forbach) is a French professional footballer who plays as a midfielder for Luxembourg club CS Grevenmacher.

== Club career ==
Louadj began his career in the junior ranks of his hometown team US Forbach. After playing briefly for FC Nantes and FC Metz, Louadj joined SV Eintracht Trier 05 in 2003. Louadj stayed at Eintracht Trier until 2006, making 16 appearances and scoring 1 goal in the Regionalliga Süd. In 2006, he returned to join US Forbach for one season, scoring 16 goals in 20 games. In 2007, Louadj signed with F91 Dudelange in the Luxembourg National Division. He remained at the club until the end of 2008.

== International career ==
Louadj was called up to an Algerian under-20 training camp but never featured for the team.

== Honours ==
F91 Dudelange

- Luxembourg National Division: 2007–08, 2008–09, 2013–14
- Luxembourg Cup (1): 2009
