= 2011–12 UEFA Champions League =

European football tournament

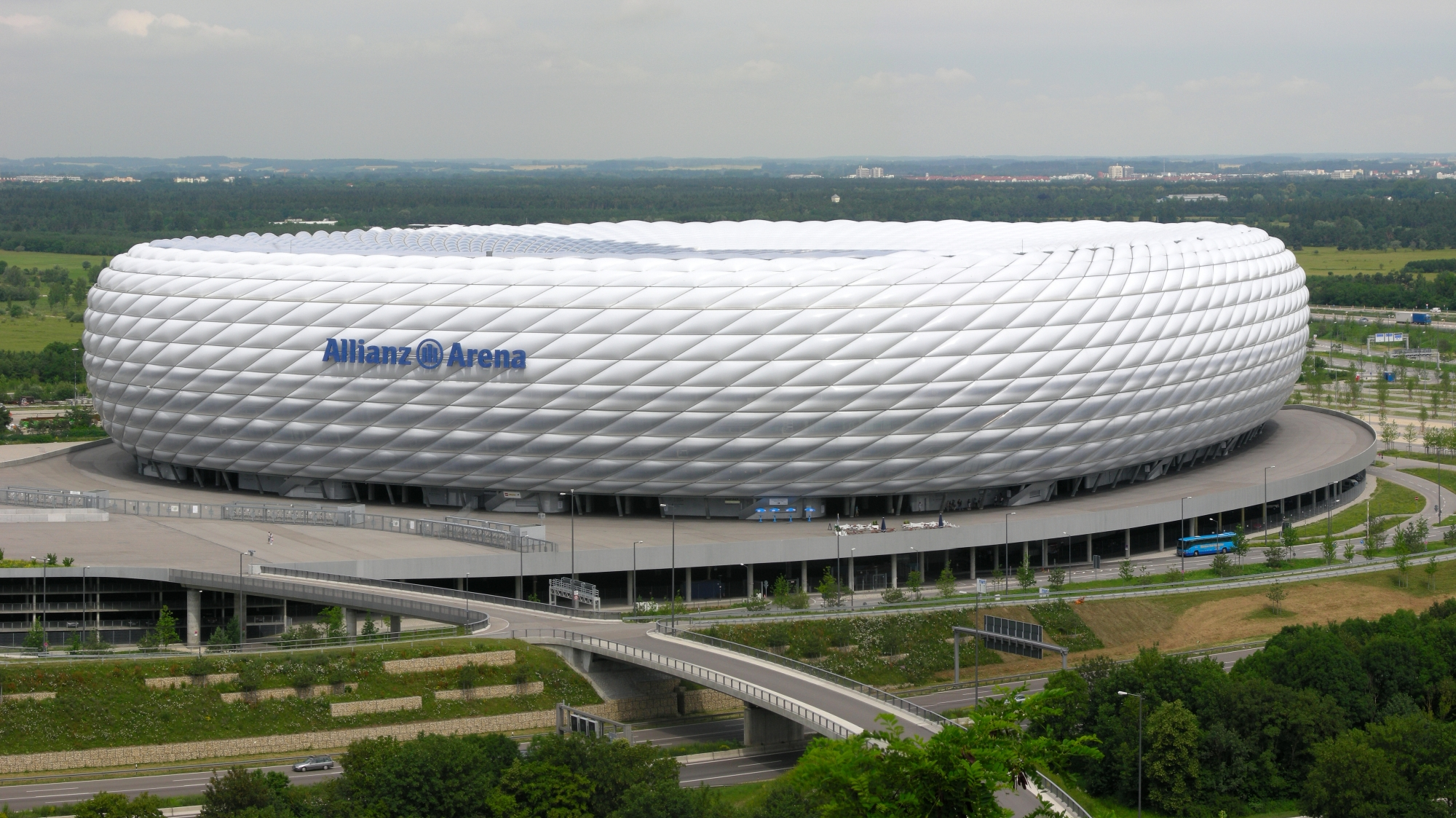
- The Allianz Arena in Munich hosted the final

Tournament details
- Dates: Qualifying: 28 June – 24 August 2011; Competition proper: 13 September 2011 – 19 May 2012
- Teams: Competition proper: 32; Total: 76 (from 52 associations)

Final positions
- Champions: (England) Chelsea (1st title)
- Runners-up: (Germany) Bayern Munich

Tournament statistics
- Matches played: 125
- Goals scored: 345 (2.76 per match)
- Top scorer(s): Lionel Messi (Barcelona); 14 goals

The 2011–12 UEFA Champions League was the 57th season of Europe's premier club football tournament organised by UEFA, and the 20th season in its current Champions League format. As part of a trial that started in the 2009–10 UEFA Europa League, two extra officials – one behind each goal – were used in all matches of the competition from the play-off round.

The final was held at the Allianz Arena in Munich, Germany. Chelsea's caretaker manager Roberto Di Matteo led the club to win their first Champions League title after beating Bayern Munich 4–3 on penalties in the final. As tenants of the Allianz Arena (known as Fußball Arena München for the final), Bayern were the first finalists to have home advantage since 1984. By winning the tournament, Chelsea earned a berth at the 2012 FIFA Club World Cup and 2012 UEFA Super Cup. Barcelona were the defending champions, but were eliminated by the eventual winners Chelsea in the semi-finals.

== Association team allocation ==
A total of 76 teams participated in the 2011–12 Champions League from 52 UEFA associations (Liechtenstein organises no domestic league competition). Associations are allocated places according to their 2010 UEFA country coefficients, which takes into account their performance in European competitions from 2005–06 to 2009–10.

Below is the qualification scheme for the 2011–12 UEFA Champions League:

- Associations 1–3 each have four teams qualify
- Associations 4–6 each have three teams qualify
- Associations 7–15 each have two teams qualify
- Associations 16–53 each have one team qualify (excluding Liechtenstein)

=== Association ranking ===
Rank	Association	Coeff.	Teams
1	England	81.856	4
2	Spain	79.757	4
3	Italy	64.338	4
4	Germany	64.207	3
5	France	53.740	3
6	Russia	43.791	3
7	Ukraine	39.550	2
8	Romania	39.491	2
9	Portugal	38.296	2
10	Netherlands	36.546	2
11	Turkey	34.450	2
12	Greece	29.899	2
13	Switzerland	28.375	2
14	Belgium	27.900	2
15	Denmark	27.350	2
16	Scotland	25.791	1
17	Bulgaria	22.000	1
18	Czech Republic	21.975	1

Rank	Association	Coeff.	Teams
19	Austria	19.575	1
20	Israel	18.875	1
21	Cyprus	17.999	1
22	Norway	17.400	1
23	Slovakia	15.832	1
24	Sweden	14.191	1
25	Serbia	14.000	1
26	Poland	12.541	1
27	Croatia	12.332	1
28	Belarus	11.541	1
29	Republic of Ireland	9.541	1
30	Finland	9.499	1
31	Bosnia and Herzegovina	8.749	1
32	Lithuania	8.416	1
33	Latvia	8.248	1
34	Moldova	7.290	1
35	Slovenia	6.957	1
36	Hungary	6.750	1

Rank	Association	Coeff.	Teams
37	Georgia	5.748	1
38	Azerbaijan	5.498	1
39	Iceland	5.415	1
40	Macedonia	5.332	1
41	Liechtenstein	4.500	0
42	Kazakhstan	4.499	1
43	Estonia	4.374	1
44	Albania	3.999	1
45	Armenia	2.999	1
46	Wales	2.581	1
47	Montenegro	2.125	1
48	Faroe Islands	1.832	1
49	Northern Ireland	1.624	1
50	Luxembourg	1.249	1
51	Andorra	1.000	1
52	Malta	0.916	1
53	San Marino	0.750	1

=== Distribution ===
Since the winners of the 2010–11 UEFA Champions League, Barcelona, obtained a place in the group stage through their domestic league placing, the reserved title holder spot in the group stage was effectively vacated. To compensate:

- The champions of association 13 (Switzerland) were promoted from the third qualifying round to the group stage.
- The champions of association 16 (Scotland) were promoted from the second qualifying round to the third qualifying round.
- The champions of associations 48 and 49 (Faroe Islands and Northern Ireland) were promoted from the first qualifying round to the second qualifying round.

		Teams entering in this round	Teams advancing from previous round
First qualifying round (4 teams)		4 champions from associations 50–53	
Second qualifying round (34 teams)		32 champions from associations 17–49 (except Liechtenstein)	2 winners from the first qualifying round
Third qualifying round	Champions Route (20 teams)	3 champions from associations 14–16	17 winners from the second qualifying round
Third qualifying round	League Route (10 teams)	9 runners-up from associations 7–15; 1 third-placed team from association 6	
Play-off round	Champions Route (10 teams)		10 winners from the third qualifying round Champions Route
Play-off round	League Route (10 teams)	2 third-placed teams from associations 4 and 5; 3 fourth-placed teams from associations 1–3	5 winners from the third qualifying round League Route
Group stage (32 teams)		13 champions from associations 1–13; 6 runners-up from associations 1–6; 3 third-placed teams from associations 1–3	5 winners from the play-off round Champions Route; 5 winners from the play-off round League Route
Knockout phase (16 teams)			8 group winners from the group stage; 8 group runners-up from the group stage

=== Teams ===
The labels in the parentheses show how each team qualified for the place of its starting round:

- TH: Champions League title holders
- 1st, 2nd, 3rd, 4th: League positions of the previous season

Group stage
(Spain) Barcelona (1st)^{TH}	(Italy) Milan (1st)	(France) Marseille (2nd)	(Portugal) Porto (1st)
(England) Manchester United (1st)	(Italy) Internazionale (2nd)	(Russia) Zenit Saint Petersburg (1st)	(Netherlands) Ajax (1st)
(England) Chelsea (2nd)	(Italy) Napoli (3rd)	(Russia) CSKA Moscow (2nd)	(Turkey) Trabzonspor (2nd)
(England) Manchester City (3rd)	(Germany) Borussia Dortmund (1st)	(Ukraine) Shakhtar Donetsk (1st)	(Greece) Olympiacos (1st)
(Spain) Real Madrid (2nd)	(Germany) Bayer Leverkusen (2nd)	(Romania) Oțelul Galați (1st)	(Switzerland) Basel (1st)
(Spain) Valencia (3rd)	(France) Lille (1st)		
Play-off round
Champions Route	League Route		
	(England) Arsenal (4th)	(Italy) Udinese (4th)	(France) Lyon (3rd)
	(Spain) Villarreal (4th)	(Germany) Bayern Munich (3rd)	
Third qualifying round
Champions Route	League Route		
(Belgium) Genk (1st)	(Russia) Rubin Kazan (3rd)	(Netherlands) Twente (2nd)	(Switzerland) Zürich (2nd)
(Denmark) Copenhagen (1st)	(Ukraine) Dynamo Kyiv (2nd)	(Turkey) Trabzonspor (2nd)	(Belgium) Standard Liège (2nd)
(Scotland) Rangers (1st)	(Romania) Vaslui (3rd)	(Greece) Panathinaikos (2nd)	(Denmark) Odense (2nd)
	(Portugal) Benfica (2nd)		
Second qualifying round
(Bulgaria) Litex Lovech (1st)	(Serbia) Partizan (1st)	(Latvia) Skonto (1st)	(Kazakhstan) Tobol (1st)
(Czech Republic) Viktoria Plzeň (1st)	(Poland) Wisła Kraków (1st)	(Moldova) Dacia Chișinău (1st)	(Estonia) Flora (1st)
(Austria) Sturm Graz (1st)	(Croatia) Dinamo Zagreb (1st)	(Slovenia) Maribor (1st)	(Albania) Skënderbeu (1st)
(Israel) Maccabi Haifa (1st)	(Belarus) BATE Borisov (1st)	(Hungary) Videoton (1st)	(Armenia) Pyunik (1st)
(Cyprus) APOEL (1st)	(Republic of Ireland) Shamrock Rovers (1st)	(Georgia (country)) Zestaponi (1st)	(Wales) Bangor City (1st)
(Norway) Rosenborg (1st)	(Finland) HJK (1st)	(Azerbaijan) Neftçi (1st)	(Montenegro) Mogren (1st)
(Slovakia) Slovan Bratislava (1st)	(Bosnia and Herzegovina) Borac Banja Luka (1st)	(Iceland) Breiðablik (1st)	(Faroe Islands) HB (1st)
(Sweden) Malmö FF (1st)	(Lithuania) Ekranas (1st)	(North Macedonia) Shkëndija (1st)	(Northern Ireland) Linfield (1st)
First qualifying round
(Luxembourg) F91 Dudelange (1st)	(Andorra) FC Santa Coloma (1st)	(Malta) Valletta (1st)	(San Marino) Tre Fiori (1st)

1. Romania (ROU): Because Politehnica Timișoara, the 2010–11 Liga I runners-up, were denied a domestic licence for the 2011–12 season, Vaslui, the third-placed team of the league, claimed the Champions League spot in the third qualifying round League Route.
2. Turkey (TUR): Fenerbahçe, the 2010–11 Süper Lig champions, was banned by the Turkish Football Federation on 24 August 2011 from participating in the 2011–12 UEFA Champions League due to the ongoing investigation into match-fixing. UEFA decided to replace them in the group stage with Trabzonspor, the league runners-up, who had lost in the Champions League third qualifying round and were participating in the Europa League play-off round at that time.

== Round and draw dates ==
All draws held at UEFA headquarters in Nyon, Switzerland unless stated otherwise.

Phase	Round	Draw date	First leg	Second leg
Qualifying	First qualifying round	20 June 2011	28–29 June 2011	5–6 July 2011
Qualifying	Second qualifying round	20 June 2011	12–13 July 2011	19–20 July 2011
Qualifying	Third qualifying round	15 July 2011	26–27 July 2011	2–3 August 2011
Play-off	Play-off round	5 August 2011	16–17 August 2011	23–24 August 2011
Group stage	Matchday 1	25 August 2011 (Monaco)	13–14 September 2011	
Group stage	Matchday 2	25 August 2011 (Monaco)	27–28 September 2011	
Group stage	Matchday 3	25 August 2011 (Monaco)	18–19 October 2011	
Group stage	Matchday 4	25 August 2011 (Monaco)	1–2 November 2011	
Group stage	Matchday 5	25 August 2011 (Monaco)	22–23 November 2011	
Group stage	Matchday 6	25 August 2011 (Monaco)	6–7 December 2011	
Knockout phase	Round of 16	16 December 2011	14–15 & 21–22 February 2012	6–7 & 13–14 March 2012
Knockout phase	Quarter-finals	16 March 2012	27–28 March 2012	3–4 April 2012
Knockout phase	Semi-finals	16 March 2012	17–18 April 2012	24–25 April 2012
Knockout phase	Final	16 March 2012	19 May 2012 at Allianz Arena, Munich	

== Qualifying rounds ==
In the qualifying rounds and the play-off round, teams were divided into seeded and unseeded teams based on their 2011 UEFA club coefficients, and then drawn into two-legged home-and-away ties. Teams from the same association cannot be drawn against each other.

=== First qualifying round ===
The draw for the first and second qualifying rounds was held on 20 June 2011. The first legs were played on 28 June, and the second legs were played on 5 and 6 July 2011.

Team 1	Agg.	Team 2	1st leg	2nd leg
Tre Fiori (San Marino)	1–5	(Malta) Valletta	0–3	1–2
FC Santa Coloma (Andorra)	0–4	(Luxembourg) F91 Dudelange	0–2	0–2

=== Second qualifying round ===
The first legs were played on 12 and 13 July, and the second legs were played on 19 and 20 July 2011.

HJK's 10–0 win over Bangor City in the second leg broke the record for the largest margin of victory in the current Champions League format.

Team 1	Agg.	Team 2	1st leg	2nd leg
Maccabi Haifa (Israel)	7–4	(Bosnia and Herzegovina) Borac Banja Luka	5–1	2–3
Mogren (Montenegro)	1–5	(Bulgaria) Litex Lovech	1–2	0–3
Maribor (Slovenia)	5–1	(Luxembourg) F91 Dudelange	2–0	3–1
Skënderbeu (Albania)	0–6	(Cyprus) APOEL	0–2	0–4
Slovan Bratislava (Slovakia)	3–1	(Kazakhstan) Tobol	2–0	1–1
Sturm Graz (Austria)	4–3	(Hungary) Videoton	2–0	2–3
Zestaponi (Georgia (country))	3–2	(Moldova) Dacia Chișinău	3–0	0–2
Dinamo Zagreb (Croatia)	3–0	(Azerbaijan) Neftçi	3–0	0–0
Pyunik (Armenia)	1–9	(Czech Republic) Viktoria Plzeň	0–4	1–5
Partizan (Serbia)	5–0	(North Macedonia) Shkëndija	4–0	1–0
Valletta (Malta)	2–4	(Lithuania) Ekranas	2–3	0–1
Malmö FF (Sweden)	3–1	(Faroe Islands) HB	2–0	1–1
Shamrock Rovers (Republic of Ireland)	1–0	(Estonia) Flora	1–0	0–0
Rosenborg (Norway)	5–2	(Iceland) Breiðablik	5–0	0–2
Bangor City (Wales)	0–13 (Note: Order of legs reversed after original draw.)	(Finland) HJK	0–3	0–10
Skonto (Latvia)	0–3	(Poland) Wisła Kraków	0–1	0–2
Linfield (Northern Ireland)	1–3	(Belarus) BATE Borisov	1–1	0–2

=== Third qualifying round ===
The draw for the third qualifying round was held on 15 July 2011. The first legs were played on 26 and 27 July, and the second legs were played on 2 and 3 August 2011.

The third qualifying round was split into two separate sections: one for champions (called the Champions Route) and one for non-champions (called the League Route). The losing teams in both sections entered the play-off round of the 2011–12 UEFA Europa League.

Team 1	Agg.	Team 2	1st leg	2nd leg
Champions Route
Litex Lovech (Bulgaria)	2–5	(Poland) Wisła Kraków	1–2	1–3
Maccabi Haifa (Israel)	3–2	(Slovenia) Maribor	2–1	1–1
HJK (Finland)	1–3	(Croatia) Dinamo Zagreb	1–2	0–1
APOEL (Cyprus)	2–0	(Slovakia) Slovan Bratislava	0–0	2–0
Copenhagen (Denmark)	3–0	(Republic of Ireland) Shamrock Rovers	1–0	2–0
Genk (Belgium)	3–2	(Serbia) Partizan	2–1	1–1
Rosenborg (Norway)	2–4	(Czech Republic) Viktoria Plzeň	0–1	2–3
Zestaponi (Georgia (country))	1–2	(Austria) Sturm Graz	1–1	0–1
Ekranas (Lithuania)	1–3	(Belarus) BATE Borisov	0–0	1–3
Rangers (Scotland)	1–2	(Sweden) Malmö FF	0–1	1–1
League Route
Standard Liège (Belgium)	1–2	(Switzerland) Zürich	1–1	0–1
Twente (Netherlands)	2–0	(Romania) Vaslui	2–0	0–0
Benfica (Portugal)	3–1	(Turkey) Trabzonspor	2–0	1–1
Dynamo Kyiv (Ukraine)	1–4	(Russia) Rubin Kazan	0–2	1–2
Odense (Denmark)	5–4	(Greece) Panathinaikos	1–1	4–3

== Play-off round ==
The draw for the play-off round was held on 5 August 2011. The first legs were played on 16 and 17 August, and the second legs were played on 23 and 24 August 2011.

The play-off round was split into two separate sections: one for champions (called the Champions Route) and one for non-champions (called the League Route). The losing teams in both sections entered the group stage of the 2011–12 UEFA Europa League.

Team 1	Agg.	Team 2	1st leg	2nd leg
Champions Route
Wisła Kraków (Poland)	2–3	(Cyprus) APOEL	1–0	1–3
Maccabi Haifa (Israel)	3–3 (1–4 p)	(Belgium) Genk	2–1	1–2 (a.e.t.)
Dinamo Zagreb (Croatia)	4–3	(Sweden) Malmö FF	4–1	0–2
Copenhagen (Denmark)	2–5	(Czech Republic) Viktoria Plzeň	1–3	1–2
BATE Borisov (Belarus)	3–1	(Austria) Sturm Graz	1–1	2–0
League Route
Odense (Denmark)	1–3	(Spain) Villarreal	1–0	0–3
Twente (Netherlands)	3–5	(Portugal) Benfica	2–2	1–3
Arsenal (England)	3–1	(Italy) Udinese	1–0	2–1
Bayern Munich (Germany)	3–0	(Switzerland) Zürich	2–0	1–0
Lyon (France)	4–2	(Russia) Rubin Kazan	3–1	1–1

== Group stage ==
Location of teams of the 2011–12 UEFA Champions League group stage.
Brown: Group A; Red: Group B; Orange: Group C; Yellow: Group D;
Green: Group E; Blue: Group F; Purple: Group G; Pink: Group H.

The group stage features 32 teams, which were allocated into pots based on their 2011 UEFA club coefficients (except the title holders, Barcelona, who were placed in Pot 1 automatically), and then drawn into eight groups of four. Teams from the same association cannot be drawn against each other. The draw was held on 25 August 2011 in Monaco.

In each group, teams play against each other home-and-away in a round-robin format. The matchdays are 13–14 September, 27–28 September, 18–19 October, 1–2 November, 22–23 November, and 6–7 December 2011. The group winners and runners-up advanced to the round of 16, while the third-placed teams entered the round of 32 of the 2011–12 UEFA Europa League.

If two or more teams are equal on points on completion of the group matches, the following criteria are applied to determine the rankings (in descending order):

1. higher number of points obtained in the group matches played among the teams in question;
2. superior goal difference from the group matches played among the teams in question;
3. higher number of goals scored in the group matches played among the teams in question;
4. higher number of goals scored away from home in the group matches played among the teams in question;
5. If, after applying criteria 1) to 4) to several teams, two teams still have an equal ranking, the criteria 1) to 4) will be reapplied to determine the ranking of these teams;
6. superior goal difference from all group matches played;
7. higher number of goals scored from all group matches played;
8. higher number of coefficient points accumulated by the club in question, as well as its association, over the previous five seasons.

Manchester City, Napoli, Oțelul Galați, Trabzonspor and Viktoria Plzeň made their debut appearances in the group stage.

=== Group A ===
Pos	Team	Pld	W	D	L	GF	GA	GD	Pts	Qualification	BAY	NAP	MCI	VIL
1	(Germany) Bayern Munich	6	4	1	1	11	6	+5	13	Advance to knockout phase	—	3–2	2–0	3–1
2	(Italy) Napoli	6	3	2	1	10	6	+4	11	Advance to knockout phase	1–1	—	2–1	2–0
3	(England) Manchester City	6	3	1	2	9	6	+3	10	Transfer to Europa League	2–0	1–1	—	2–1
4	(Spain) Villarreal	6	0	0	6	2	14	−12	0		0–2	0–2	0–3	—

Source: Soccerway

=== Group B ===
Pos	Team	Pld	W	D	L	GF	GA	GD	Pts	Qualification	INT	CSKA	TRA	LIL
1	(Italy) Internazionale	6	3	1	2	8	7	+1	10	Advance to knockout phase	—	1–2	0–1	2–1
2	(Russia) CSKA Moscow	6	2	2	2	9	8	+1	8	Advance to knockout phase	2–3	—	3–0	0–2
3	(Turkey) Trabzonspor	6	1	4	1	3	5	−2	7	Transfer to Europa League	1–1	0–0	—	1–1
4	(France) Lille	6	1	3	2	6	6	0	6		0–1	2–2	0–0	—

Source: Soccerway

=== Group C ===
Pos	Team	Pld	W	D	L	GF	GA	GD	Pts	Qualification	BEN	BSL	MUN	OTE
1	(Portugal) Benfica	6	3	3	0	8	4	+4	12	Advance to knockout phase	—	1–1	1–1	1–0
2	(Switzerland) Basel	6	3	2	1	11	10	+1	11	Advance to knockout phase	0–2	—	2–1	2–1
3	(England) Manchester United	6	2	3	1	11	8	+3	9	Transfer to Europa League	2–2	3–3	—	2–0
4	(Romania) Oțelul Galați	6	0	0	6	3	11	−8	0		0–1	2–3	0–2	—

Source: Soccerway

=== Group D ===
Pos	Team	Pld	W	D	L	GF	GA	GD	Pts	Qualification	RMA	LYO	AJX	DZG
1	(Spain) Real Madrid	6	6	0	0	19	2	+17	18	Advance to knockout phase	—	4–0	3–0	6–2
2	(France) Lyon	6	2	2	2	9	7	+2	8 (Note: Tied on head-to-head results. Overall goal difference was used as the tiebreaker.)	Advance to knockout phase	0–2	—	0–0	2–0
3	(Netherlands) Ajax	6	2	2	2	6	6	0	8	Transfer to Europa League	0–3	0–0	—	4–0
4	(Croatia) Dinamo Zagreb	6	0	0	6	3	22	−19	0		0–1	1–7	0–2	—

Source: Soccerway

=== Group E ===
Pos	Team	Pld	W	D	L	GF	GA	GD	Pts	Qualification	CHE	LEV	VAL	GNK
1	(England) Chelsea	6	3	2	1	13	4	+9	11	Advance to knockout phase	—	2–0	3–0	5–0
2	(Germany) Bayer Leverkusen	6	3	1	2	8	8	0	10	Advance to knockout phase	2–1	—	2–1	2–0
3	(Spain) Valencia	6	2	2	2	12	7	+5	8	Transfer to Europa League	1–1	3–1	—	7–0
4	(Belgium) Genk	6	0	3	3	2	16	−14	3		1–1	1–1	0–0	—

Source: Soccerway

=== Group F ===
Pos	Team	Pld	W	D	L	GF	GA	GD	Pts	Qualification	ARS	MAR	OLY	DOR
1	(England) Arsenal	6	3	2	1	7	6	+1	11	Advance to knockout phase	—	0–0	2–1	2–1
2	(France) Marseille	6	3	1	2	7	4	+3	10	Advance to knockout phase	0–1	—	0–1	3–0
3	(Greece) Olympiacos	6	3	0	3	8	6	+2	9	Transfer to Europa League	3–1	0–1	—	3–1
4	(Germany) Borussia Dortmund	6	1	1	4	6	12	−6	4		1–1	2–3	1–0	—

Source: Soccerway

=== Group G ===
Pos	Team	Pld	W	D	L	GF	GA	GD	Pts	Qualification	APO	ZEN	POR	SHK
1	(Cyprus) APOEL	6	2	3	1	6	6	0	9 (Note: Head-to-head points: APOEL 4, Zenit Saint Petersburg 1.)	Advance to knockout phase	—	2–1	2–1	0–2
2	(Russia) Zenit Saint Petersburg	6	2	3	1	7	5	+2	9	Advance to knockout phase	0–0	—	3–1	1–0
3	(Portugal) Porto	6	2	2	2	7	7	0	8	Transfer to Europa League	1–1	0–0	—	2–1
4	(Ukraine) Shakhtar Donetsk	6	1	2	3	6	8	−2	5		1–1	2–2	0–2	—

Source: Soccerway

=== Group H ===
Pos	Team	Pld	W	D	L	GF	GA	GD	Pts	Qualification	BAR	MIL	PLZ	BATE
1	(Spain) Barcelona	6	5	1	0	20	4	+16	16	Advance to knockout phase	—	2–2	2–0	4–0
2	(Italy) Milan	6	2	3	1	11	8	+3	9	Advance to knockout phase	2–3	—	2–0	2–0
3	(Czech Republic) Viktoria Plzeň	6	1	2	3	4	11	−7	5	Transfer to Europa League	0–4	2–2	—	1–1
4	(Belarus) BATE Borisov	6	0	2	4	2	14	−12	2		0–5	1–1	0–1	—

Source: Soccerway

== Knockout phase ==
In the knockout phase, teams play against each other over two legs on a home-and-away basis, except for the one-match final.

In the draw for the round of 16, the eight group winners were seeded, and the eight group runners-up were unseeded. The seeded teams were drawn against the unseeded teams, with the seeded team hosting the second leg. Teams from the same group or the same association could not be drawn against each other. In the draws for the quarter-finals onwards, there are no seedings, and teams from the same group or the same association may be drawn with each other.

=== Bracket ===
Round of 16
(France) Marseille (a)	1	1	2
(Italy) Internazionale	0	2	2
(Switzerland) Basel	1	0	1
(Germany) Bayern Munich	0	7	7
(France) Lyon	1	0	1 (3)
(Cyprus) APOEL (p)	0	1	1 (4)
(Russia) CSKA Moscow	1	1	2
(Spain) Real Madrid	1	4	5
(Russia) Zenit Saint Petersburg	3	0	3
(Portugal) Benfica	2	2	4
(Italy) Napoli	3	1	4
(England) Chelsea (a.e.t.)	1	4	5
(Italy) Milan	4	0	4
(England) Arsenal	0	3	3
(Germany) Bayer Leverkusen	1	1	2
(Spain) Barcelona	3	7	10

Quarter-finals
(France) Marseille	0	0	0
(Germany) Bayern Munich	2	2	4
(Cyprus) APOEL	0	2	2
(Spain) Real Madrid	3	5	8
(Portugal) Benfica	0	1	1
(England) Chelsea	1	2	3
(Italy) Milan	0	1	1
(Spain) Barcelona	0	3	3

Semi-finals
(Germany) Bayern Munich (p)	2	1	3 (3)
(Spain) Real Madrid	1	2	3 (1)
(England) Chelsea	1	2	3
(Spain) Barcelona	0	2	2

Final
19 May – Munich
(Germany) Bayern Munich	1 (3)
(England) Chelsea (p)	1 (4)

=== Round of 16 ===
The draw for the round of 16 was held on 16 December 2011. The first legs were played on 14, 15, 21 and 22 February, and the second legs were played on 6, 7, 13 and 14 March 2012.

Team 1	Agg.	Team 2	1st leg	2nd leg
Lyon (France)	1–1 (3–4 p)	(Cyprus) APOEL	1–0	0–1 (a.e.t.)
Napoli (Italy)	4–5	(England) Chelsea	3–1	1–4 (a.e.t.)
Milan (Italy)	4–3	(England) Arsenal	4–0	0–3
Basel (Switzerland)	1–7	(Germany) Bayern Munich	1–0	0–7
Bayer Leverkusen (Germany)	2–10	(Spain) Barcelona	1–3	1–7
CSKA Moscow (Russia)	2–5	(Spain) Real Madrid	1–1	1–4
Zenit Saint Petersburg (Russia)	3–4	(Portugal) Benfica	3–2	0–2
Marseille (France)	2–2 (a)	(Italy) Internazionale	1–0	1–2

=== Quarter-finals ===
The draw for the quarter-finals was held on 16 March 2012. The first legs were played on 27 and 28 March, and the second legs were played on 3 and 4 April 2012.

Team 1	Agg.	Team 2	1st leg	2nd leg
APOEL (Cyprus)	2–8	(Spain) Real Madrid	0–3	2–5
Marseille (France)	0–4	(Germany) Bayern Munich	0–2	0–2
Benfica (Portugal)	1–3	(England) Chelsea	0–1	1–2
Milan (Italy)	1–3	(Spain) Barcelona	0–0	1–3

=== Semi-finals ===
The draw for the semi-finals was held on 16 March 2012, after the quarter-final draw. The first legs were played on 17 and 18 April, and the second legs were played on 24 and 25 April 2012.

Team 1	Agg.	Team 2	1st leg	2nd leg
Bayern Munich (Germany)	3–3 (3–1 p)	(Spain) Real Madrid	2–1	1–2 (a.e.t.)
Chelsea (England)	3–2	(Spain) Barcelona	1–0	2–2

=== Final ===
The final was played on 19 May 2012 at the Allianz Arena in Munich, Germany. A draw was held on 16 March 2012, after the quarter-final and semi-final draws, to determine the "home" team for administrative purposes.

19 May 2012
20:45 UTC+2

Bayern Munich (Germany)	1–1 (a.e.t.)	(England) Chelsea
Müller 83'	Report	Drogba 88'
Penalties
Lahm (penalty scored); Gómez (penalty scored); Neuer (penalty scored); Olić (penalty missed); Schweinsteiger (penalty missed)	3–4	(penalty missed) Mata; (penalty scored) David Luiz; (penalty scored) Lampard; (penalty scored) Cole; (penalty scored) Drogba

Allianz Arena, Munich
Attendance: 62,500
Referee: Pedro Proença (Portugal)

== Statistics ==
Statistics exclude qualifying rounds and play-off round.

=== Top goalscorers ===
Rank	Player	Team	Goals	Minutes played
1	(Argentina) Lionel Messi	(Spain) Barcelona	14	990
2	(Germany) Mario Gómez	(Germany) Bayern Munich	12	1,003
3	(Portugal) Cristiano Ronaldo	(Spain) Real Madrid	10	930
4	(France) Karim Benzema	(Spain) Real Madrid	7	760
5	(Ivory Coast) Didier Drogba	(England) Chelsea	6	670
6	(Spain) José Callejón	(Spain) Real Madrid	5	307
6	(Spain) Roberto Soldado	(Spain) Valencia	5	515
6	(France) Bafétimbi Gomis	(France) Lyon	5	530
6	(Switzerland) Alexander Frei	(Switzerland) Basel	5	611
6	(Ivory Coast) Seydou Doumbia	(Russia) CSKA Moscow	5	611
6	(Russia) Roman Shirokov	(Russia) Zenit Saint Petersburg	5	658
6	(Uruguay) Edinson Cavani	(Italy) Napoli	5	701
6	(Sweden) Zlatan Ibrahimović	(Italy) Milan	5	720

=== Squad of the season ===
The UEFA technical observers selected the following 21 players as the squad of the tournament.

Pos.	Player	Team
GK	(Czech Republic) Petr Čech	(England) Chelsea
GK	(Germany) Manuel Neuer	(Germany) Bayern Munich
GK	(Spain) Iker Casillas	(Spain) Real Madrid
DF	(Spain) Sergio Ramos	(Spain) Real Madrid
DF	(Germany) Philipp Lahm	(Germany) Bayern Munich
DF	(England) Ashley Cole	(England) Chelsea
DF	(Brazil) Dani Alves	(Spain) Barcelona
DF	(Spain) Gerard Piqué	(Spain) Barcelona
DF	(Portugal) Pepe	(Spain) Real Madrid
MF	(Spain) Xabi Alonso	(Spain) Real Madrid
MF	(England) Frank Lampard	(England) Chelsea
MF	(Spain) Xavi	(Spain) Barcelona
MF	(Spain) Andrés Iniesta	(Spain) Barcelona
MF	(Brazil) Ramires	(England) Chelsea
MF	(Germany) Bastian Schweinsteiger	(Germany) Bayern Munich
FW	(Argentina) Lionel Messi	(Spain) Barcelona
FW	(Portugal) Cristiano Ronaldo	(Spain) Real Madrid
FW	(Sweden) Zlatan Ibrahimović	(Italy) AC Milan
FW	(Netherlands) Robin van Persie	(England) Arsenal
FW	(Germany) Mesut Özil	(Spain) Real Madrid
FW	(Ivory Coast) Didier Drogba	(England) Chelsea

== See also ==
- 2011–12 UEFA Europa League
- 2012 FIFA Club World Cup
- 2012 UEFA Super Cup
- 2011–12 UEFA Women's Champions League
