= Stade Jos Nosbaum =

Football stadium in Dudelange, Luxembourg

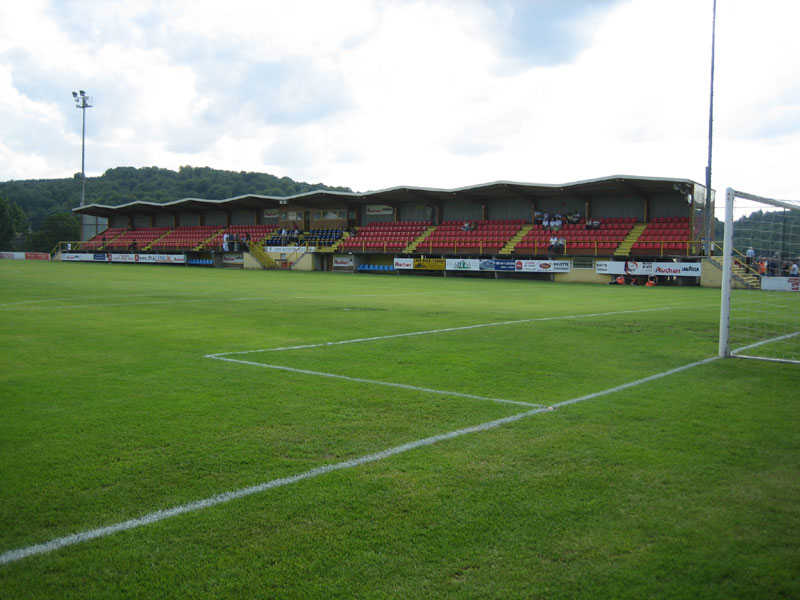
- Stade Jos Nosbaum's main stand, Dudelange, Luxembourg
- Interactive map of Stade Jos Nosbaum
- Full name: Stade Jos Nosbaum
- Location: Dudelange, Luxembourg
- Coordinates: 49°28′20″N 06°05′05″E
- Capacity: 2,558
- Surface: grass

Tenant
- F91 Dudelange

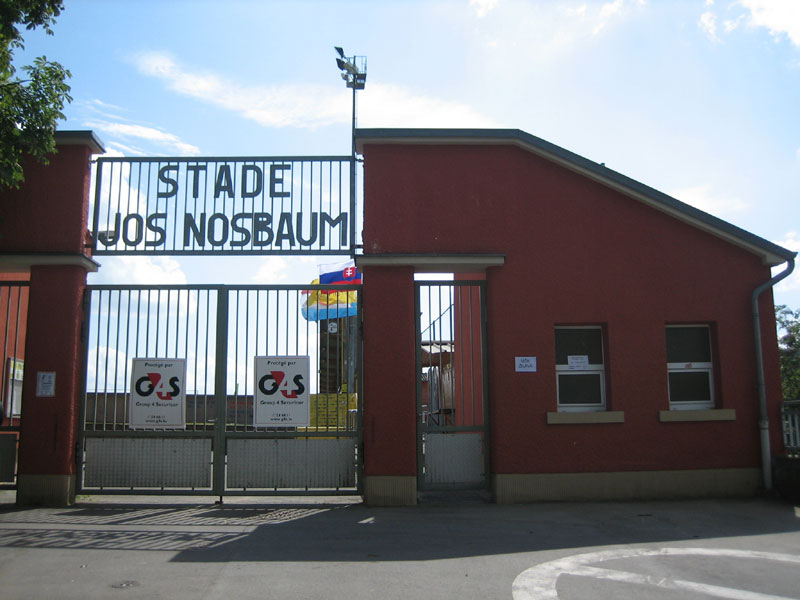
Stadium entrance

The Stade Jos Nosbaum is a football stadium in Dudelange, in southern Luxembourg. It is currently the home stadium of F91 Dudelange. Until 1991, it was the home of US Dudelange. The stadium has a capacity of 2,558.
