= Henri Cirelli =

Luxembourgish footballer (1934–2021)

Personal information
- Date of birth: 23 December 1934
- Place of birth: Dudelange, Luxembourg
- Date of death: 25 September 2021 (aged 86)
- Position: Midfielder

Senior career*
Years	Team	Apps	(Gls)
1952–1962	Alliance Dudelange		
1962–1963	Beerschot A.C.	17	(3)
1963–1965	Alliance Dudelange		
1971–1975	Avenir Beggen		

International career
1956–1965	Luxembourg	37	(6)
- * Club domestic league appearances and goals

Henri Cirelli (23 December 1934 – 25 September 2021) was a Luxembourgish footballer who played as a midfielder.

== Career ==
Born in Dudelange, Cirelli played club football for Alliance Dudelange, Beerschot A.C. and Avenir Beggen. He was also a member of the Luxembourg national team between 1956 and 1965, scoring six goals in 37 games. He later worked as a coach with a number of teams.
