= Jalid Sehouli =

German gynaecologist and oncologist (born 1968)

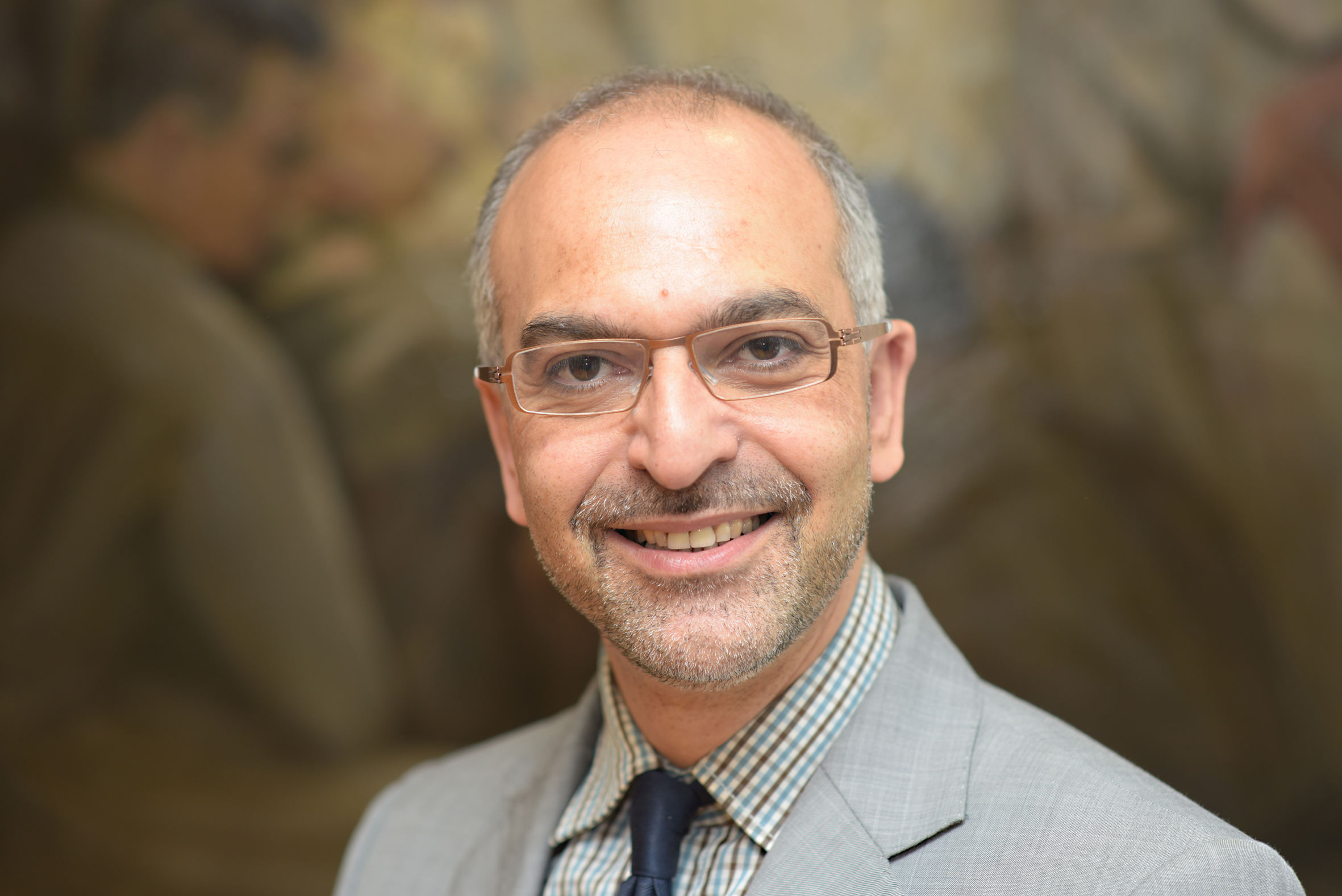
Jalid Sehouli

Jalid Sehouli (born 19 April 1968) is a Moroccan-German gynaecologist and oncologist who specializes in peritoneal and ovarian cancer. He is a professor at Berlin's Charité hospital and a writer of scientific as well as fiction works.

== Career ==
Sehouli is the son of Moroccan parents who fled from Morocco in the 1960s, for political reasons, and were illiterate. He grew up in the Berlin working-class district of Wedding. While training to become a nurse he was offered a place to study medicine at Freie Universität Berlin. He studied there from 1989 to 1995.

In 1998 he earned his doctorate with a thesis on "Post-operative Use of Unconventional Cancer Therapies in Gynaecological Oncology". In 2002 he was certified as a specialist in gynaecology and obstetrics. In 2005 he completed his habilitation at Humboldt-Universität zu Berlin with a postdoctoral thesis on "Multimodal Management of Malignant Ovarian Tumours".

In 2005 he was appointed to teach gynaecology and obstetrics. In 2007 he accepted the offer of a W2 professorship at Berlin's Charité hospital. In 2014 he was selected for the W3 full Professorship for Gynaecology for life at the Charité and has since been Director of the Clinic for Gynaecology and a full professor at the Charité.

Sehouli specializes in experimental surgical gynaecology and oncosurgery as well as the subject of doctor-patient communication (e.g. breaking bad news). Sehouli is co-editor of various professional journals and author (first, senior, or co-author) of several hundred articles in national and international journals on all aspects of gynaecology with an emphasis on diagnosis, therapy, and aftercare in gynaecological oncology. He has been, and is, the lead of various national and international phase I, II, and III studies of targeted therapies. He is also the editor and author of numerous scientific books or contributions to them.

Sehouli has been a member of the board of Nord-Ostdeutsche Gesellschaft für Gynäkologische Onkologie (NOGGO e.V.) since its foundation in 1998, was Chairman of the Gesellschaft für Geburtshilfe und Gynäkologie in Berlin from 2015 to 2016, is currently the spokesman of the organ commission Ovar of the Arbeitsgemeinschaft Gynäkologische Onkologie (AGO), and is an active member of various national and international associations and bodies of experts.

In 2015 Sehouli received the Roma Focus Award for his contributions to gynaecological oncology, in 2016 the Moroccan King Mohammed VI awarded him an order of merit for his scientific achievements, and in 2017 he won a Diwan Award in Germany.

In 2012 Sehouli published his first work of fiction, Marrakesch. In his second non-scientific book, Und von Tanger fahren die Boote nach irgendwo (2016), he makes Tanger, his parents' home city, the point of departure for philosophical and autobiographical reflections which also involve his life in Berlin. In 2018 he published Von der Kunst, schlechte Nachrichten gut zu überbringen (On the Art of Breaking Bad News Well), a book about doctor-patient communication.

On the 20 of December 2019, Jalid Sehouli received in Paris the cultures of peace award by the international network City for the Cultures of Peace (https://www.peace-culture.org/contacts). He received this award based on his intensive scientific and social-cultural international activities.

Jalid Sehouli published a book “The Art of Breaking Bad News Well” in an English and German edition and is a co-author of a book about creative writing for cancer patients and their relatives a book about creative writing.

In 2026, Jalid Sehouli was awarded the Order of Merit of the Federal Republic of Germany (Bundesverdienstkreuz am Bande) in Berlin.

On 24 June 2026, Sehouli was honored by the Embassy of the Kingdom of Morocco in Berlin, with the distinction presented by Ambassador Zohour Alaoui. The recognition honored his outstanding scientific achievements in gynecologic oncology as well as his longstanding commitment to fostering scientific and societal dialogue between Germany, Morocco, Europe, and Africa.

On 27 August 2026, Sehouli delivered the 2026 Otto Käser Memorial Lecture as part of the 60th Annual Continuing Education Conference of the Department of Gynecology at University Hospital Basel. The lecture focused on the importance of quality of life in gynecologic oncology. Sehouli was honored as the recipient of the 2026 Otto Käser Memorial Lecture Award.

Sehouli is married to Adak Pirmorady-Sehouli and has four children.

== Selected publications ==
- Sehouli, Jalid; Lichtenegger, Werner: Eierstockkrebs: Ratgeber für Patientinnen und Angehörige. Hamburg 2004.
- Sehouli, Jalid (Hrsg.): Handbuch Klinische Studien. 3rd completely revised edition. Hamburg 2014.
- Sehouli, Jalid (Hrsg.): Lichtenegger, Werner (Hrsg.): Moderne Therapien in der Gynäkologischen Onkologie. Hamburg 2014.
- Marrakesch. Hamburg 2012. new edition: Berlin 2018.
- Und von Tanger fahren die Boote nach irgendwo. (novel) Berlin 2016.
- The Art of Breaking Bad News Well, Routledge; English; ISBN 978-0367356682
- Über die Kunst schlechte Nachrichten gut zu überbringen, Kösel Verlag; ISBN 9783466347025
- Mit Schreiben zu neuer Lebenskraft, Kösel Verlag; ISBN 9783466347254
