= Pascal Carzaniga =

French football manager (born 1971)

Personal information
- Date of birth: 4 May 1971 (age 55)
- Place of birth: France

Managerial career
- Years: Team
- 2001–2008: BX Brussels
- 2008–2013: CSO Amnéville
- 2013–2014: F91 Dudelange
- 2015–2016: FC Progrès Niederkorn
- 2016–2018: FC Differdange 03
- 2020–2021: FC Swift Hesperange
- 2022–2023: FC Swift Hesperange
- 2024–2026: Royal Excelsior Virton

Pascal Carzaniga (born 4 May 1971) is a French football manager.

== Career ==
Carzaniga started his managerial career with Belgian side BX Brussels in 2001. In 2008, he was appointed manager of French side CSO Amnéville. Five years later, he was appointed manager of Luxembourgish side F91 Dudelange, helping the club win the league title. Subsequently, he was appointed manager of Luxembourgish side FC Progrès Niederkorn in 2015.

Following his stint there, he was appointed manager of Luxembourgish side FC Differdange 03 in 2016. Six years later he returned as manager of Luxembourgish side FC Swift Hesperange for the second time, helping the club win the league title for the first time.

== Personal life ==
Carzaniga was born on 4 May 1991 in France. Besides working as a football manager, he has also worked as a car mechanic.
