= Théo Scholten =

Luxembourgish footballer

Personal information
- Date of birth: 4 January 1963 (age 63)
- Position: Midfielder

Senior career*
Years	Team	Apps	(Gls)
1983–1984	Aris Bonnevoie		
1984–1990	Jeunesse Esch		
1990–1996	Avenir Beggen		
1996–1999	CS Grevenmacher		

International career
1984–1990	Luxembourg	21	(0)

Managerial career
- 2008–2010: Swift Hesperange
- * Club domestic league appearances and goals

Théo Scholten (born 4 January 1963) is a Luxembourgish former footballer who played as a midfielder. He became Luxembourg National Division top goalscorer in 1988–89 and was awarded Luxembourgish Footballer of the Year in 1994.
