= Dany Theis =

Luxembourgish footballer (1967–2022)

Personal information
- Date of birth: 11 September 1967
- Place of birth: Esch-sur-Alzette, Luxembourg
- Date of death: 29 December 2022 (aged 55)
- Position: Midfielder

Youth career
- Jeunesse Esch

Senior career*
Years	Team	Apps	(Gls)
1986–1999	Jeunesse Esch		
1999–2000	Union Luxembourg		
2000–2001	Avenir Beggen		
2001–2002	Progrès Niederkorn		

International career
1991–2001	Luxembourg	34	(0)

Managerial career
- Luxembourg U19
- 2009–2011: Differdange 03
- 2011–2012: F91 Dudelange
- 2013–2015: Jeunesse Esch
- * Club domestic league appearances and goals

Dany Theis (11 September 1967 – 29 December 2022) was a Luxembourgish football player and manager. A midfielder, he made 34 appearances for the Luxembourg national team.

Theis died of complications from a heart attack and a fall on 29 December 2022, at the age of 55.
