= 1939–40 Luxembourg National Division =

Luxembourg National Division
- Season: 1939–40
- Champions: Stade Dudelange (2nd title)
- Matches: 90
- Goals: 470 (5.22 per match)
- Highest scoring: AS Differdange 4–9 FC Progrès Niedercorn

The 1939–40 Luxembourg National Division was the 30th season of top level association football in Luxembourg.

== Overview ==
It was performed in 10 teams, and Stade Dudelange won the championship.

== League standings ==
Pos	Team	Pld	W	D	L	GF	GA	GD	Pts
1	Stade Dudelange	18	13	5	0	68	21	+47	31
2	US Dudelange	18	11	2	5	79	34	+45	24
3	FC Progrès Niedercorn	18	9	4	5	49	34	+15	22
4	National Schifflange	18	8	3	7	41	45	−4	19
5	CA Spora Luxembourg	18	8	2	8	36	37	−1	18
6	Union Luxembourg	18	8	1	9	49	43	+6	17
7	FA Red Boys Differdange	18	7	2	9	48	51	−3	16
8	Chiers Rodange	18	6	2	10	36	54	−18	14
9	Jeunesse Esch	18	6	0	12	30	51	−21	12
10	AS Differdange	18	3	1	14	34	100	−66	7

Source: rsssf.com

== Results ==
Home \ Away	CHI	ASD	USD	JEU	NAT	PRO	RBD	SPO	STD	UNI
Chiers Rodange		7–2	2–10	2–4	2–2	0–3	2–1	1–2	4–4	3–1
AS Differdange	1–0		3–9	0–3 (Note: Match awarded.)	2–7	4–9	3–4	3–0	1–8	0–7
US Dudelange	5–0	8–0		2–0	1–2	4–0	8–1	6–0	3–3	4–2
Jeunesse Esch	2–4	2–5	1–5		0–1	4–3	0–3	2–1	0–6	4–1
National Schifflange	1–2	4–3	5–2	4–2		3–0	4–2	1–1	0–5	2–3
Progrès Niederkorn	2–1	4–2	3–3	3–0	5–0		1–1	1–0	2–2	5–0
Red Boys Differdange	4–2	1–1	2–7	3–2	5–2	2–4		6–1	2–3	7–1
Spora Luxembourg	3–1	6–1	4–1	2–3	0–0	5–2	3–2		0–1	3–2
Stade Dudelange	6–1	11–1	2–0	1–0	6–2	1–1	3–1	3–2		0–0
Union Luxembourg	1–2	10–2	4–1	5–1	4–1	2–1	4–1	1–3	1–3	

Legend: Blue = home team win; Yellow = draw; Red = away team win.
