= Cirelli =

Cirelli is an Italian surname. Notable people with the surname include:

- Anthony Cirelli (born 1997), Canadian ice hockey player
- Henri Cirelli (1934–2021), Luxembourger footballer
- Marcelo Cirelli (born 1984), Argentine footballer
- Mary Cirelli (born 1939), American politician
- Vincent Cirelli, American special effects supervisor
