= Yasin El Harrouk =

German actor and rapper

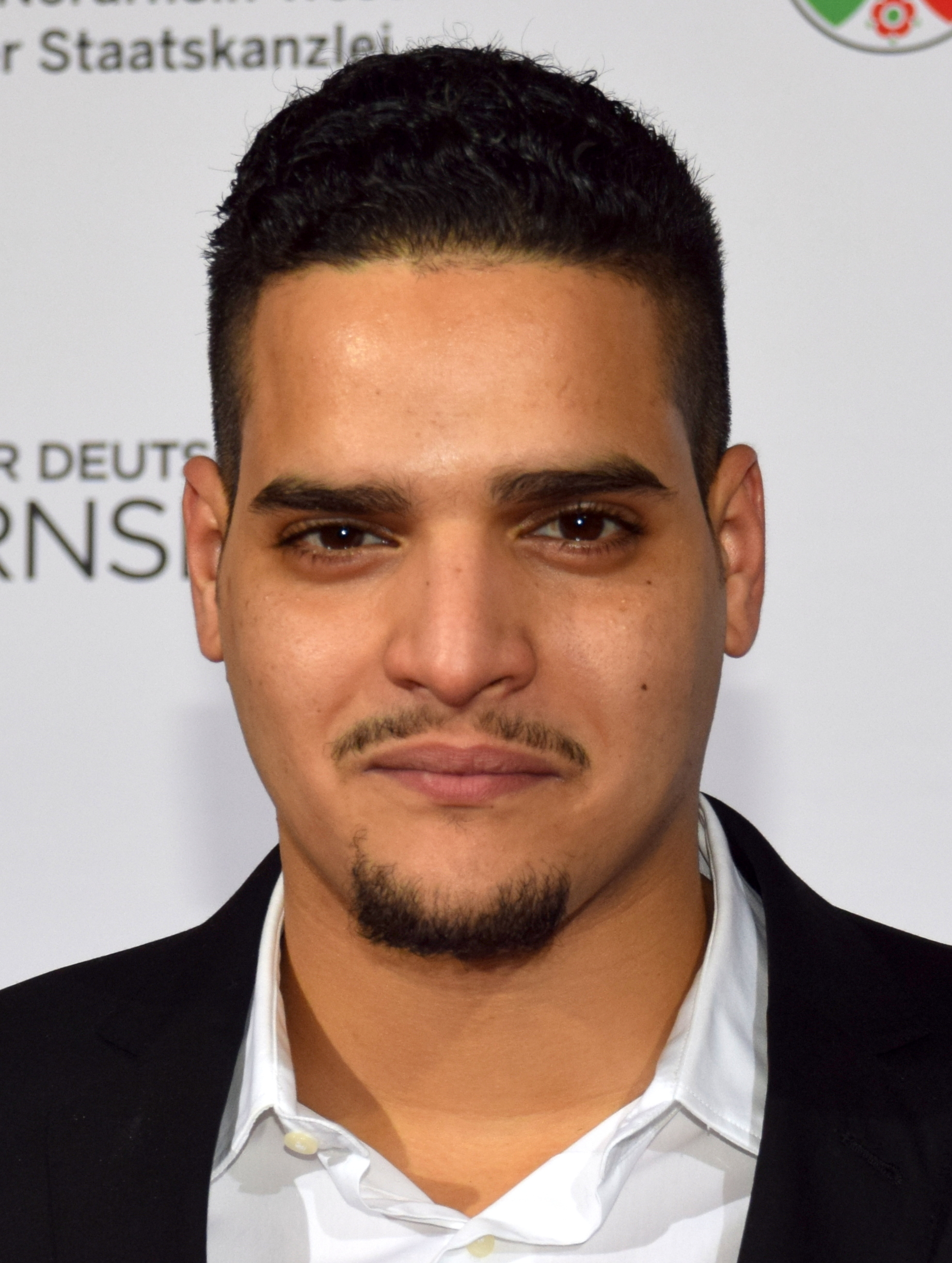
Yasin El Harrouk

Yasin El Harrouk, known artistically as YONII, is a German actor and rapper of Moroccan origin. He sings in both German and Moroccan Arabic.

== Biography ==
Yasin El Harouk was born in 1991 in Germany to a family of Moroccan guest workers from Berkane, and grew up with six siblings in Stuttgart-Feuerbach. After graduating high school, he lived in Morocco for four years before returning to Stuttgart, where he studied acting at the Stuttgart University of Music and Performing Arts. He became known in Germany after a friend posted a 4-minute freestyle of his on YouTube. The video amassed millions of views. YONII then decided to launch his musical career by releasing his first single entitled Ghetto. This single was part of his first EP project entitled 'Entre 2 Mondes which was released in 2017.

In 2018, he collaborated with Ismo, Riffi, Biwai and Mr. Crazy on the official song of the Moroccan team for the 2018 World Cup.

== Discography ==
=== Studio albums ===
- 2017 : Entre 2 Mondes
- 2019 : Emeute

=== Singles ===
- 2016 : Ghetto
- 2017 : Mama
- 2017 : Ziel halal
- 2017 : Anonym
- 2018 : Lampedusa
- 2018 : Welt sehen
- 2018 : Direction
- 2018 : Leinwand
- 2019 : Cabaret
- 2019 : Randale
- 2019 : Habibti
- 2019 : Martinique
- 2020 : Fugazi (feat. Farid Bang)

=== Collaborations ===
- 2018 : Mabrouk 3lina by Ismo ft YONII
- 2018 : DEJA VU by Mike Singer ft YONII
- 2018 : Zu Spät by Mudi ft YONII
- 2020 : Sans Papiers by Max Herre ft YONII

== Filmography ==
- 2014 : Tatort - Der Wüstensohn
- 2017 : Die Herberge
- 2017 : Helen Dorn- Verlorene Mädchen
- 2017 : Tatort - Am End geht man nackt
- 2017 : Alerte Cobra
- 2017 : Stralsund: Kein Weg zurück
- 2018 : Herrliche Zeiten

=== TV ===
- 2018 : Dogs of Berlin
