= FC Swift Hesperange =

Association football club in Luxembourg

Swift Hesperange
- Full name: Football Club Swift Hesperange
- Founded: 2 July 1916; 110 years ago
- Ground: Stade Alphonse Theis, Hesperange
- Capacity: 4,100
- Chairman: Fernand Laroche
- Manager: Salem El Foukhari
- League: National Division
- 2025–26: National Division, 12th of 16
- Website: www.swifthesper.lu
| Home colours | Away colours | Third colours |

Football Club Swift Hesperange (Luxembourgish: Football Club Swift Hesper, German: Football Club Swift Hesperingen) is a football club based in Hesperange, in southern Luxembourg. They currently compete in the National Division, the top tier of Luxembourgish football.

== History ==
- 1916: Club founded as FC Swift Hesperange
- 1940: Club renamed as FV Rot-Weiß Hesperingen during the German occupation
- 1944: Original name FC Swift Hesperange restored
- 1985: First season in National Division
- 1990: Winners of Luxembourg Cup
- 1990: First participation in European competition (season 1990–91)

In the 2005–2006 season, Hesperange finished ninth in the National Division. The following year, they improved this position to fifth, level on points with fourth-placed Racing FC and sixth-placed CS Grevenmacher. During the 2013–2014 season, Hesperange finished 13th and has thus been relegated to the Éierepromotioun. They gained promotion back to the top division in the 2019–2020 season where they finished third in their first season back and qualified for play in Europe.

=== Financial Crisis ===
It was announced at the end of the 2025–26 season that the club would start the 2026–27 National Division with a 12 point deduction: 10 for outstanding tax and payments to players, and 2 for failing to eliminate negative equity.

== Honours ==
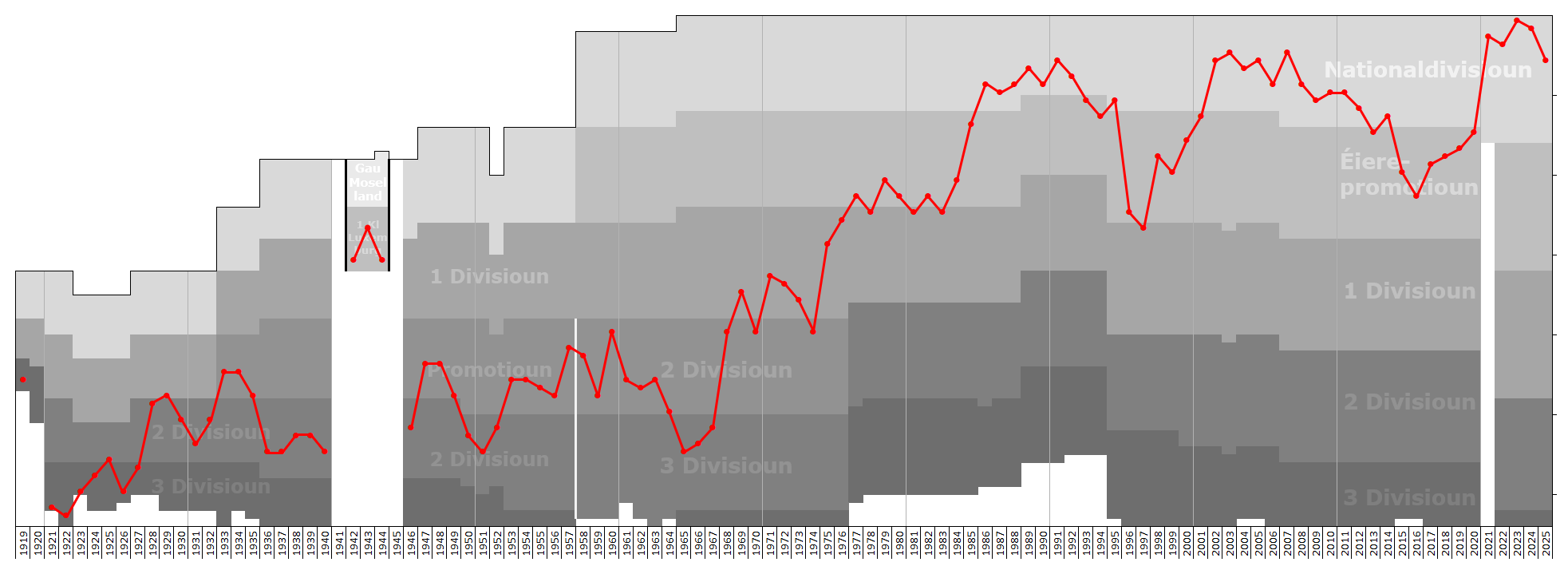
Historical league performance chart of FC Swift Hesperange

- Luxembourg National Division

Winners (1): 2022–23
Runners-up (1): 2023–24

- Luxembourg Cup

Winners (1): 1989–90
Runners-up (1): 2023–24

== European competition ==
As of 17 August 2023

Overall, Swift's record in European competition reads:

| Competition | P | W | D | L | F | A |
|---|---|---|---|---|---|---|
| Champions League | 2 | 0 | 1 | 1 | 1 | 3 |
| Conference League | 6 | 2 | 2 | 2 | 8 | 9 |
| Cup Winners' Cup | 2 | 0 | 0 | 2 | 0 | 6 |
| Total | 10 | 2 | 3 | 5 | 9 | 18 |

| Season | Competition | Round | Opponent | 1st Leg | 2nd Leg | Agg |
|---|---|---|---|---|---|---|
| 1990–91 Cup Winners' Cup | | R1 | (Poland) Legia Warsaw | 0–3 (A) | 0–3 (H) | 0–6 |
| 2023–24 Champions League | | Q1 | (Slovakia) Slovan Bratislava | 1–1 (A) | 0–2 (H) | 1–3 |
| 2021–22 Conference League | | Q1 | (Slovenia) Domžale | 0–1 (A) | 1–1 (H) | 1–2 |
| 2023–24 Conference League | | Q2 | (Wales) The New Saints | 1–1 (A) | 3–2 (H) | 4–3 |
| 2023–24 Conference League | | Q3 | (North Macedonia) Struga | 1–3 (A) | 2–1 (H) | 3–4 |

Q1, Q2, Q3: Qualification Rounds; R1: First Round

== Current squad ==
As of 15 September 2026

Note: Flags indicate national team as defined under FIFA eligibility rules; some limited exceptions apply. Players may hold more than one non-FIFA nationality.

| No. | Pos. | Nation | Player |
|---|---|---|---|
| 2 | DF | LUX | Eldin Cikotic |
| 3 | DF | FRA | Issam El Foukhari |
| 6 | MF | BEL | Yanis Bouazzati |
| 8 | MF | FRA | Helias Belliard |
| 9 | FW | FRA | Noah Bochu |
| 11 | MF | GER | Mohamed Morabet |
| 12 | MF | ANG | Edgar Neves |
| 14 | FW | POR | Francisco Ninte |
| 17 | DF | FRA | Mael Zaim |
| 18 | MF | BEL | Jenovi Sthibangu Mbo |
| 19 | FW | GUI | Mamady Sylla |

| No. | Pos. | Nation | Player |
|---|---|---|---|
| 21 | DF | LUX | Tiago Barros |
| 26 | DF | GHA | Jerry Prempeh |
| 27 | MF | LUX | Evan Ilunga-Kapongo |
| 28 | MF | LUX | Tom Pereira Gonçalves |
| 36 | DF | LUX | Kenan Skenderovic |
| 42 | GK | COD | Carmel Kiambu |
| 44 | GK | LUX | Hugo Costa |
| 78 | DF | FRA | Gédéon Tshiabuiye |
| 80 | FW | POR | Lucas Jordão |
| 99 | GK | FRA | Enzo Iecle |

=== Out on loan ===
Note: Flags indicate national team as defined under FIFA eligibility rules; some limited exceptions apply. Players may hold more than one non-FIFA nationality.

| No. | Pos. | Nation | Player |

== Managers ==
- (Luxembourg) Théo Scholten (1 July 1999 – 30 June 2002)
- (France) Marco Morgante (1 July 2002 – 30 June 2004)
- (Luxembourg) Carlo Weis (1 July 2004 – 30 June 2005)
- (Luxembourg) Benny Reiter (1 July 2005 – 3 April 2006)
- (Luxembourg) Luc Muller (3 April 2006 – 3 March 2008)
- (Luxembourg) Daniel Andreosso (4 March 2008 – 30 June 2008)
- (Luxembourg) Théo Scholten (1 July 2008 – 29 March 2010)
- (Italy) Angelo Fiorucci (29 March 2010 – 14 March 2011)
- (Bosnia and Herzegovina) Nedžib Selimović (14 March 2011 – 8 March 2012)
- (Luxembourg) Dany Theis (9 March 2012 – 30 June 2012)
- (France) Serge Wolf (1 July 2012 – 19 October 2015)
- (Italy) Carlo Tutucci (19 October 2015 – 1 December 2015)
- (France) Serge Wolf (1 January 2016 – 3 October 2018)
- (Luxembourg) Dany Theis (10 October 2018 – 30 June 2020)
- (Luxembourg) Jeff Strasser (1 July 2020 – 14 October 2020)
- (Italy) Pascal Carzaniga (15 October 2020 – 30 June 2021)
- (France) Vincent Hognon (1 July 2021 – 20 September 2021)
- (Italy) Aniello Parisi (23 September 2021 – 24 May 2022)
- (Italy) Pascal Carzaniga (24 May 2022 – 30 June 2023)
- (Portugal) Carlos Fangueiro (1 July 2023 – 14 November 2023)
- (Germany) Roland Vrabec (21 November 2023 – 30 June 2024)
- (France) Emmanuel Da Costa (1 July 2024 – 9 February 2025)
- (France) Hakim Menai (9 February 2025 – 27 October 2025)
- (Morocco) Salem El Foukhari (5 November 2025 – present)
