= Fouad Brighache =

German footballer

Personal information
- Date of birth: 10 May 1982 (age 44)
- Place of birth: Frankfurt, West Germany
- Height: 1.76 m (5 ft 9 in)
- Position: Right-back

Youth career
- Blau-Gelb Frankfurt
- TuS Niedereschbach
- –1997: FV Bad Vilbel
- 1997–2001: Kickers Offenbach

Senior career*
Years	Team	Apps	(Gls)
2001–2004	Kickers Offenbach	37	(0)
2004–2005	TuS Koblenz	0	(0)
2005–2006	1. FC Eschborn	3	(0)
2006	VfR Neumünster	16	(1)
2006–2009	Kickers Offenbach	14	(0)
2009–2012	Darmstadt 98	97	(0)
2012–2014	Eintracht Trier	61	(1)
2015–2016	Hessen Dreieich	13	(0)
Total		241	(2)
- * Club domestic league appearances and goals

Fouad Brighache (born 10 May 1982) is a German former professional footballer who played as a right-back.
