= US Dudelange =

Defunct association football club in Luxembourg

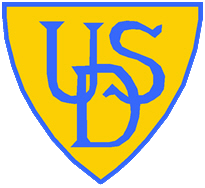
- Full name: Union Sportive Dudelange
- Founded: 1912
- Dissolved: 26 April 1991

Union Sportive Dudelange was a football club from Dudelange in southern Luxembourg, and a predecessor of F91 Dudelange.

== History ==
The team was founded in 1912 as a merger between Minerva Dudelange and Jeunesse de la Frontière 1908 Dudelange. Under German occupation in World War II, its name was changed between 1941 and 1944 to SV Düdelingen as part of the Germanisation program.

The team was strongest in the late 1930s and 1940s. They won the Luxembourg Cup in 1939 and came runners-up in the Luxembourg National Division four times, reaching another cup final in 1958.

In 1991, the team merged with Alliance Dudelange and Stade Dudelange into the current F91 Dudelange. The new club inherited Alliance's place in the Luxembourg Division of Honour (second tier) as the other two entities were in the 1. Division (third).

History of F91 Dudelange

Unknown founded date Minerva Deich Dudelange
1908; Jeunesse Dudelange	1912 (merge); US Dudelange
1909; SC Dudelange
1908; Gallia Dudelange	1912 (rename); Sparta Luxembourg	1913 (rename); Stade Dudelange	1991 (merge); F91 Dudelange
1908; Étoile Bleue Dudelange
1916 (merge); Alliance Dudelange
1912; Étoile Rouge Dudelange

== Honours ==
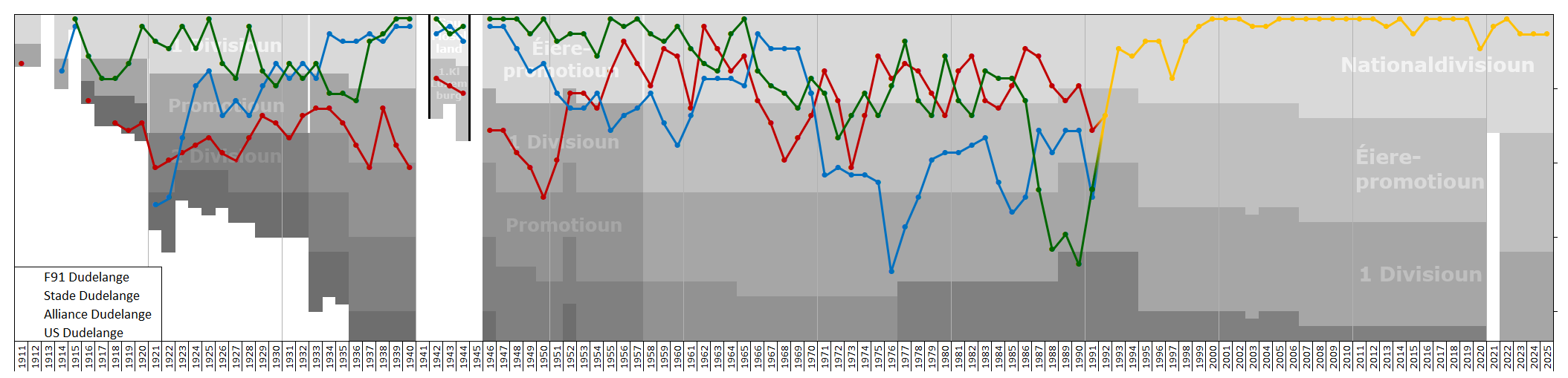
Historical league performance chart of F91 Dudelange and its predecessors, including US Dudelange

- Luxembourg National Division
  - Runners-up (2): 1938–39, 1939–40, 1945–46, 1946–47
- Luxembourg Cup
  - Winners (1): 1938–39
  - Runners-up (1): 1957–58
