= Mohamed Morabet =

German-Moroccan footballer

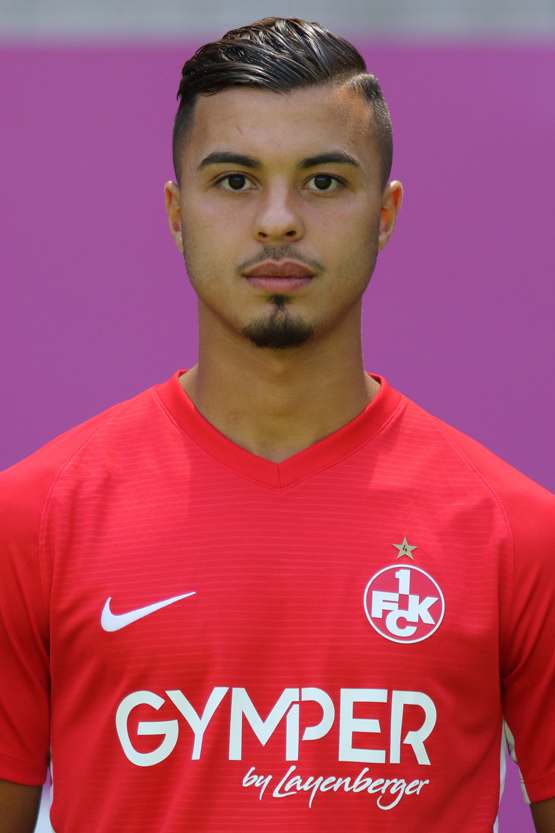
- Morabet in 2019

Personal information
- Date of birth: 31 January 1998 (age 28)
- Place of birth: Frankfurt, Germany
- Height: 1.76 m (5 ft 9 in)
- Position: Midfielder

Team information
- Current team: Swift Hesperange
- Number: 11

Youth career
- –2013: FSV Frankfurt
- 2013–2014: Wehen Wiesbaden
- 2014–: FSV Frankfurt

Senior career*
Years	Team	Apps	(Gls)
2016–2017	FSV Frankfurt	9	(0)
2017–2020	1. FC Kaiserslautern II	78	(29)
2020–2021	1. FC Kaiserslautern	12	(2)
2021	→ VfR Aalen (loan)	10	(0)
2021-2022	1. FC Kaiserslautern II	32	(11)
2023-2024	Swift Hesperange	7	(1)
2025-	Swift Hesperange	23	(1)
- * Club domestic league appearances and goals as of 13 June 2026

Mohamed Morabet (born 31 January 1998) is a German-Moroccan professional footballer who plays as a midfielder for Swift Hesperange.
