= Abdelkader Salhi (serial killer) =

German serial killer

- Born: October 1, 1967 (age 59); Wiesbaden, West Germany
- Other names: "10 Killer" "Costa del Sol Serial Killer"; Martin Sparitt
- Convictions: Murder; Manslaughter
- Penalty: 45 years imprisonment

Details
- Victims: 3–4+
- Span of crimes: 1988–2011
- Country: Germany, Spain
- State: Málaga Province
- Date apprehended: September 23, 2011
- Imprisoned at: Alhaurín Jail

Abdelkader Salhi (born 1967), known as The 10 Killer, is a Moroccan-German serial killer who murdered at least two prostitutes in Spain between August and September 2011, after having been released from a murder conviction in Germany. He was convicted of the latter murders and sentenced to 45 years imprisonment, but was acquitted in the murder of another woman.

== Early life and move to Spain ==
A native of Wiesbaden, Germany, Salhi was born to a Moroccan father and a German mother. He developed a deep disgust towards prostitutes from a young age, since his father's extramarital activities resulted in the separation of his parents. In 1988, while trying to rob a woman, Salhi killed her, which landed him an 18 year prison sentence.

After his release, Salhi illegally moved to Spain in 2007 under another identity, settling in a residence at Fontana Beach, Riviera del Sol. According to his Moroccan girlfriend, Sara Er Rezyni, he was constantly jealous when it came to his privacy and constantly avoided contradicting himself. He also held four forged passports (including Irish, French and Italian) and spoke four languages.

== Murders ==
According to investigating authorities, Salhi contacted his victims through telephone after seeing their adverts in a local English-language newspaper. In order to gain their trust, he first visited them several times, having casual sex with them. After killing the women, he would steal their mobile phones, cash and credit cards, with his girlfriend later withdrawing 1,000 euros from the first two victims' bank accounts. Sara's mother was later found out to be in possession of one of the phones.

=== Unknown woman ===
Originally from Argentina but with Spanish nationality, the 45-year-old was killed in her rented apartment at the Complejo Alhamar in Calahonda on August 10, 2011. She had been stabbed 17 times, with a pillowcase later being tied around her neck and a pillow put on her head. Her son found her body the following morning.

=== Brigitte SR ===
The 49-year-old German prostitute was found dead by police at her Calahonda apartment on September 2, although it was estimated that she had died a week before. At the time of discovery, the corpse was at an advanced stage of decomposition, but police managed to find that Salhi's number was the last one the victim had called before her death.

=== Maryuri Alice Pérez García ===
The 47-year-old Ecuadorian-born Pérez was killed at her shared apartment in San Pedro de Alcantara on September 10. She had been stabbed 13 times and then robbed of her phone, credit card and 100 euros. It was noted that in this instance, the killer had taken the knife with him, but after the murder, had cleaned it up before leaving it at a kitchen drawer in Pérez's house.

== Arrest and trial ==
Detectives working on both cases began developing a theory that the murders were committed by the same person, backed up by the fact that the victims were supposedly chosen because they were vulnerable women who received their clients in rented flats. Through examination of phone records, they received another clue to the killer's identity, but the discovery came after 2,000 euros were withdrawn from one of the women's bank accounts.

Authorities later arrested Salhi while he was working out in a local gym under the assumed name of Martin Sparitt. During the subsequent five hour investigation, he confessed to the Costa del Sol murders, providing great detail in both instances. Brigitte SR's case was later connected to the series, and he is currently being investigated for possible other murders around Spain.

Despite the evidence presented, Salhi later recanted his confessions, claiming that the arresting officers had threatened and beaten him into signing the confessions. However, Rezyni admitted during questioning that on the day of one of the murders, she had seen wounds on Abdelkader.

In July 2015, Salhi was convicted for two of the murders, receiving a combined sentence of 45 years imprisonment for one count of murder, manslaughter, two counts of robberies and forgery. He was acquitted for one of the murders due to lack of evidence.

== See also ==
- List of serial killers by country
