= Alliance Dudelange =

Defunct association football club in Luxembourg

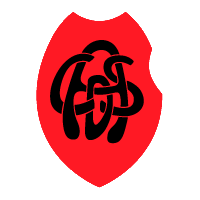
- Founded: 1916
- Dissolved: 1991
- Stadium: Stade Amadéo Barozzi, Dudelange
- Capacity: 1,000
- 1990–91: Division of Honour Series 2, 6th of 12
Home colours

Club Sportif Alliance Dudelange was a football club from Dudelange in southern Luxembourg. It is now part of F91 Dudelange.

It was founded in 1916 as a merger between Étoile Rouge Dudelange (1908) and Étoile Bleue Dudelange (1912). Under German occupation in World War II, its name was changed to FV Rot-Schwarz Düdelingen as part of the Germanisation program.

Before merging into F91 Dudelange, the club played at the Stade Amadéo Barozzi.

== History ==
History of F91 Dudelange

Unknown founded date Minerva Deich Dudelange
1908; Jeunesse Dudelange	1912 (merge); US Dudelange
1909; SC Dudelange
1908; Gallia Dudelange	1912 (rename); Sparta Luxembourg	1913 (rename); Stade Dudelange	1991 (merge); F91 Dudelange
1908; Étoile Bleue Dudelange
1916 (merge); Alliance Dudelange
1912; Étoile Rouge Dudelange

The club was associated with the city's Italian community. Louis Rech, the first Luxembourgish mayor of Italian origin, was also its president.

The team had its greatest decade in the 1960s. They won back-to-back Luxembourg Cups in 1961 and 1962 runners-up in the Luxembourg National Division in the latter year, reaching a third cup final in 1969. On all these occasions, the other finalist or league champion was Union Luxembourg.

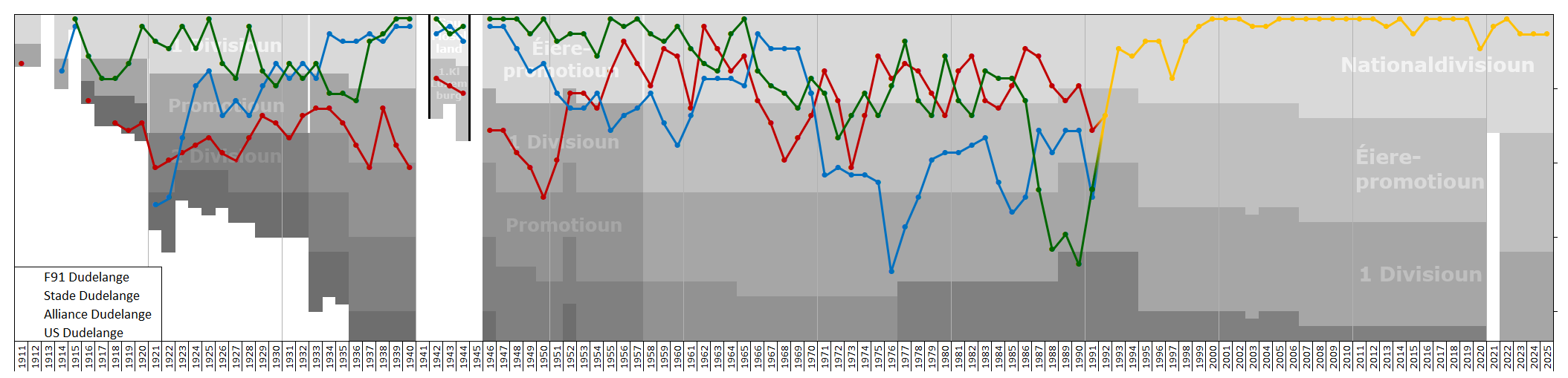
Historical league performance chart of F91 Dudelange and its predecessors, including Alliance Dudelange

During this time, they also qualified twice for the UEFA Cup Winners' Cup. In 1961–62 they were eliminated 9–2 on aggregate in the first round by East Germany's Motor Zena, and a year later they fell at the same stage by the same score to B 1909 of Denmark.

In 1991, the team merged with Stade Dudelange and US Dudelange into the current F91 Dudelange. The new club inherited Alliance's place in the Luxembourg Division of Honour (second tier) as the other two entities were in the 1. Division (third).
