= F91 Dudelange =

Association football club in Luxembourg

- Full name: F91 Dudelange
- Short name: F91
- Founded: 26 April 1991; 35 years ago
- Ground: Stade Jos Nosbaum, Dudelange
- Capacity: 2,558
- President: Gerry Schintgen
- Manager: Claudio Lombardelli
- League: National Division
- 2025–26: National Division, 5th of 16
- Website: www.f91.lu
Home colours	Away colours

F91 Dudelange (French: [ɛf katʁəvɛ̃.ɔ̃z dydlɑ̃ʒ]; Luxembourgish: F91 Diddeleng, pronounced [ævˌeːnɑˈnontsəɕ ˈdidəleŋ]) is a Luxembourgish professional football club based in Dudelange, currently playing in the National Division, the top tier of Luxembourgish football.

It was formed in 1991 as a merger between three teams in the town: Alliance Dudelange, Stade Dudelange and US Dudelange. Domestically, it has since won the National Division on 16 occasions and the Luxembourg Cup eight times.

F91 Dudelange made it to the 2018–19 UEFA Europa League group stage, becoming the first club from the country to reach the group stage of a European competition. Dudelange also made the 2019–20 UEFA Europa League group stage where they became the first team from Luxembourg to win a game in the group stage after a shock 4–3 victory over APOEL of Cyprus.

== History ==
History of F91 Dudelange

Unknown founded date Minerva Deich Dudelange
1908; Jeunesse Dudelange	1912 (merge); US Dudelange
1909; SC Dudelange
1908; Gallia Dudelange	1912 (rename); Sparta Luxembourg	1913 (rename); Stade Dudelange	1991 (merge); F91 Dudelange
1908; Étoile Bleue Dudelange
1916 (merge); Alliance Dudelange
1912; Étoile Rouge Dudelange

It was formed in 1991 from the clubs Alliance Dudelange, Stade Dudelange, and US Dudelange. All three clubs had won the National Division or the Luxembourg Cup before, but each had fallen upon hard times, and the amalgamated club was expected to be more stable, in both a sporting and financial sense.

Stade Dudelange and US Dudelange had been in Luxembourg's third tier (the 1. Division), whilst Alliance Dudelange was struggling to remain in the second league (the Division of Honour). The new club would take Alliance's place in the Division of Honour in the 1991–92 season.

F91 was promoted in its first season, and soon established itself as a competent top-flight team, not finishing outside the top half of the table until 1996–97. Towards the end of the 1990s, Dudelange gradually improved, and brought to an end Jeunesse Esch's era of dominance by storming to the 1999–00 league title by eleven points.

In 2004–05, Dudelange won the title and competed in the UEFA Champions League for the 2005–06 season. In the competition Dudelange became the first club in Luxembourg's history to reach the second qualifying round, after a remarkable victory over NK Zrinjski (they lost 0–1 at home in the first leg, in the second leg they scored a goal in the 3rd minute of stoppage time to equalize on aggregate, and then scored 3 more goals in extra time). However, Dudelange were easily beaten by Rapid Wien in the second qualifying round.

In the 2005–06 season, Dudelange completed the league and cup Double for the first time since the merger. They replicated this feat in the 2006–07 season, and won a fourth consecutive National Division title in 2007–08.

In the 2012–13 UEFA Champions League, F91 Dudelange defeated Tre Penne 11–0 on aggregate, earning them an appointment with Austrian champion Red Bull Salzburg in the second round. They defeated Salzburg 1–0 in Luxemburg, and lost 3–4 in Salzburg, to win the tie on the away goal rule. For the first time in club history, Dudelange qualified for the third round of the competition, in which they were beaten 5–1 on aggregate by Maribor.

In 2013–14, Dudelange reclaimed the title with a 3–0 victory over Fola Esch on the final day of the season. This earned the club a spot in the 2014–15 UEFA Champions League.

In 2018, F91 Dudelange became the first Luxembourgish team to reach the group stage of a major European competition, after defeating CFR Cluj 5–2 on aggregate in the UEFA Europa League play-off round. Due to Dudelange's apparent underdog status, daily newspaper Gazeta Sporturilor regarded CFR's elimination as "the biggest shame in the history of Romanian football". Dudelange had also previously defeated Polish side Legia Warsaw in the third qualifying round. Dudelange were drawn into a 'Group of Death', containing European powerhouses AC Milan, Olympiacos and Spanish side Real Betis. The Luxembourgers did, however, managed to pick up a famous and hard-fought point, on the last matchday, when they drew 0–0 against Real Betis at the Stade Josy Barthel.

In 2019, Dudelange qualified for the Europa League group stages for the second successive season after defeating FC Ararat-Armenia in the play-off round in a penalty shootout.

Dudelange fared much better in their second European group stage adventure, being drawn into a group with Europa League stalwarts Sevilla, Cypriot champions APOEL and Qarabağ of Azerbaijan.

On the first group stage matchday, on 19 September 2019, Dudelange became the first ever team from Luxembourg to win a game in a European group stage after beating APOEL 4–3 in Nicosia. Dudelange, whose coach Emilio Ferrera had resigned only two days prior, came back from a 3–2 deficit to defeat the Cypriots.

After losing their next four group matches, Dudelange faced Qarabag on the last matchday in Baku, where they came within two minutes of recording another famous win before the Azeri side equalised in injury time. Dudelange finished bottom of the group with 4 points.

== Honours ==
=== Domestic ===
==== League ====
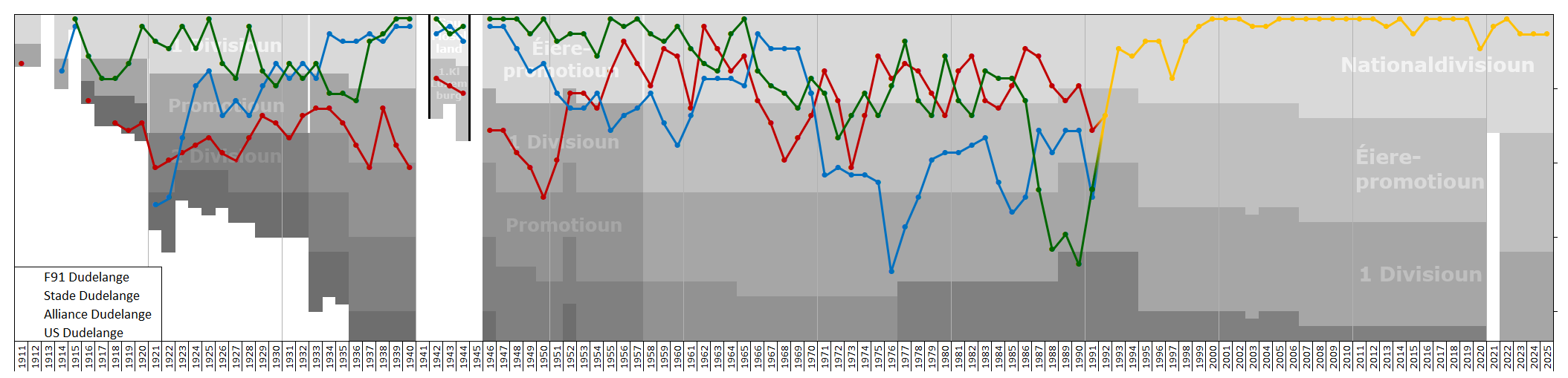
Historical league performance chart of F91 Dudelange and its predecessors

- Luxembourg National Division
  - Winners (16): 1999–2000, 2000–01, 2001–02, 2004–05, 2005–06, 2006–07, 2007–08, 2008–09, 2010–11, 2011–12, 2013–14, 2015–16, 2016–17, 2017–18, 2018–19, 2021–22
  - Runners-up (5): 1998–99, 2002–03, 2003–04, 2009–10, 2012–13, 2020–21

==== Cups ====
- Luxembourg Cup
  - Winners (8): 2003–04, 2005–06, 2006–07, 2008–09, 2011–12, 2015–16, 2016–17, 2018–19
  - Runners-up (8): 1992–93, 1993–94, 2001–02, 2010–11, 2013–14, 2014–15, 2021–22, 2024–25

== European record ==
=== Matches ===
Season	Competition	Round	Club	Home	Away	Aggregate
1993–94	UEFA Cup Winners' Cup	QR	(Israel) Maccabi Haifa	0–1	1–6	1–7
1994–95	UEFA Cup Winners' Cup	QR	(Hungary) Ferencváros	1–6	1–6	2–12
1999–00	UEFA Cup	QR	(Croatia) Hajduk Split	1–1	0–5	1–6
2000–01	UEFA Champions League	1Q	(Bulgaria) Levski Sofia	0–4	0–2	0–6
2001–02	UEFA Champions League	1Q	(Latvia) Skonto	1–6	1–0	2–6
2002–03	UEFA Champions League	1Q	(North Macedonia) Vardar	1–1	0–3	1–4
2003–04	UEFA Cup	QR	(Slovakia) Artmedia Petrzalka	0–1	0–1	0–2
2004–05	UEFA Cup	1Q	(Lithuania) FK Ekranas	1–2	0–1	1–3
2005–06	UEFA Champions League	1Q	(Bosnia and Herzegovina) Zrinjski Mostar	0–1	4–0^{[A]}	4–1
2005–06	UEFA Champions League	2Q	(Austria) Rapid Wien	1–6	2–3	3–9
2006–07	UEFA Champions League	1Q	(North Macedonia) Rabotnički	0–1	0–0	0–1
2007–08	UEFA Champions League	1Q	(Slovakia) MŠK Žilina	1–2	4–5	5–7
2008–09	UEFA Champions League	1Q	(Slovenia) Domžale	0–1	0–2	0–3
2009–10	UEFA Champions League	2Q	(Latvia) Ventspils	1–3	0–3	1–6
2010–11	UEFA Europa League	1Q	(Denmark) Randers	2–1	1–6	3–7
2011–12	UEFA Champions League	1Q	(Andorra) FC Santa Coloma	2–0	2–0	4–0
2011–12	UEFA Champions League	2Q	(Slovenia) Maribor	1–3	0–2	1–5
2012–13	UEFA Champions League	1Q	(San Marino) Tre Penne	7–0	4–0	11–0
2012–13	UEFA Champions League	2Q	(Austria) Red Bull Salzburg	1–0	3–4	4–4 (a)
2012–13	UEFA Champions League	3Q	(Slovenia) Maribor	0–1	1–4	1–5
2012–13	UEFA Europa League	PO	(Israel) Hapoel Tel Aviv	1–3	0–4	1–7
2013–14	UEFA Europa League	1Q	(Moldova) Milsami Orhei	0–0	0–1	0–1
2014–15	UEFA Champions League	2Q	(Bulgaria) Ludogorets Razgrad	0–4	1–1	1–5
2015–16	UEFA Europa League	1Q	(Republic of Ireland) UCD	2–1	0–1	2–2 (a)
2016–17	UEFA Champions League	2Q	(Azerbaijan) Qarabağ	1–1	0–2	1–3
2017–18	UEFA Champions League	2Q	(Cyprus) APOEL	0–1	0–1	0–2
2018–19	UEFA Champions League	1Q	(Hungary) MOL Vidi	1–1	1–2	2–3
2018–19	UEFA Europa League	2Q	(Kosovo) Drita	2–1	1–1	3–2
2018–19	UEFA Europa League	3Q	(Poland) Legia Warsaw	2–2	2–1	4–3
2018–19	UEFA Europa League	PO	(Romania) CFR Cluj	2–0	3–2	5–2
2018–19	UEFA Europa League	Group F	(Greece) Olympiacos	0–2	1–5	4th
2018–19	UEFA Europa League	Group F	(Italy) Milan	0–1	2–5	4th
2018–19	UEFA Europa League	Group F	(Spain) Real Betis	0–0	0–3	4th
2019–20	UEFA Champions League	1Q	(Malta) Valletta	2–2	1−1	3–3 (a)
2019–20	UEFA Europa League	2Q	(North Macedonia) Shkëndija	1–1	2−1	3–2
2019–20	UEFA Europa League	3Q	(Estonia) Nõmme Kalju	3−1	1−0	4–1
2019–20	UEFA Europa League	PO	Ararat-Armenia	2–1	1−2	3–3 (p)
2019–20	UEFA Europa League	Group A	(Spain) Sevilla	2–5	0−3	4th
2019–20	UEFA Europa League	Group A	(Cyprus) APOEL	0−2	4−3	4th
2019–20	UEFA Europa League	Group A	(Azerbaijan) Qarabağ	1−4	1–1	4th
2021–22	UEFA Europa Conference League	2Q	(Republic of Ireland) Bohemians	0–1	0–3	0–4
2022–23	UEFA Champions League	1Q	(Albania) Tirana	1–0	2−1	3–1
2022–23	UEFA Champions League	2Q	(Armenia) Pyunik	1−4	1–0	2–4
2022–23	UEFA Europa League	3Q	(Sweden) Malmö FF	2–2	0−3	2–5
2022–23	UEFA Europa Conference League	PO	(Poland) Lech Poznań	1–1	0–2	1–3
2023–24	UEFA Europa Conference League	1Q	(Republic of Ireland) St Patrick's Athletic	2–1	3–2	5–3
2023–24	UEFA Europa Conference League	2Q	(Malta) Gżira United	2−1	0–2	2–3
2024–25	UEFA Conference League	1Q	(Andorra) Atlètic Club d'Escaldes	2−0	1−0	3–0
2024–25	UEFA Conference League	2Q	(Sweden) Häcken	2−6	1−6	3–12
2025–26	UEFA Conference League	1Q	(Andorra) Atlètic Club d'Escaldes	2−3	0−2	2–5

=== Notes ===
- QR: Qualifying round
- 1Q: First qualifying round
- 2Q: Second qualifying round
- 3Q: Third qualifying round
- PO: Play-off round
- A After extra time.

== Current squad ==
As of 8 September 2026

Note: Flags indicate national team as defined under FIFA eligibility rules; some limited exceptions apply. Players may hold more than one non-FIFA nationality.

No.	Pos.	Nation	Player
2	DF	POR	Dylan Magalhaes
3	DF	LUX	Mirza Rasiti
4	DF	LUX	Rodrigo Tavares
5	MF	FRA	Joris Belgacem
6	MF	LUX	Ivan Englaro
7	FW	LUX	Igor Teles Santos
8	MF	LUX	Diogo Monteiro
9	FW	CGO	Herman Moussaki
10	MF	LUX	Belmin Muratovic
11	FW	FRA	Redouane Boulbrachène
12	FW	GER	Conrad Azong
14	FW	GBS	Bruno Ramírez
16	GK	LUX	Eldin Latik
17	FW	POR	Martim Elmano Mendes Marcelino
18	MF	LUX	Vin Schmit

No.	Pos.	Nation	Player
20	DF	LUX	Valentino Tallarico
21	MF	LUX	Samuel Almeida
22	MF	BEL	Charles Morren
23	DF	BRA	Isaque Gavioli
25	GK	LUX	Dzenis Novalic
27	DF	FRA	Leny Tela
33	DF	LUX	Chris Stumpf
36	DF	COD	Wilson Kamavuaka
37	FW	LUX	Leandro Matos
38	MF	LUX	Enzo Lima
66	MF	BEL	Hanibal Solomon
77	GK	LUX	Enzo Esposito
—	DF	FRA	Gédéon Dimbu Nsiala
—	DF	GER	Felix Göttlicher

== Managers ==
- (Belgium) Philippe Guérard (1 July 1994 – Sept 25, 1994)
- (France) Benny Reiter (1 July 1996 – 1 Dec 1997)
- (Italy) Angelo Fiorucci (1 July 1998 – 30 June 2000)
- (Luxembourg) Carlo Weis (1 July 2000 – Sept 24, 2003)
- (Germany) Roger Lutz (25 Oct 2003 – 30 June 2004)
- (France) Michel Leflochmoan (1 July 2004 – 30 June 2009)
- (Belgium) Marc Grosjean (1 July 2009 – 10 June 2011)
- (Luxembourg) Claude Origer (caretaker) (15 Aug 2009 – 31 Dec 2009)
- (Luxembourg) Dan Theis (13 June 2011 – 17 Oct 2011)
- (Germany) Ralph Pinatti Stange (caretaker) (18 Oct 2011 – 25 Nov 2011)
- (France) Didier Philippe (25 Oct 2011 – 13 Nov 2012)
- (France) Patrick Hesse (16 Nov 2012 – 30 May 2013)
- (France) Pascal Carzaniga (1 July 2013 – 28 May 2014)
- (Belgium) Sébastien Grandjean (1 July 2014 – 30 June 2015)
- (France) Michel Leflochmoan (1 July 2015 – 30 June 2016)
- (Germany) Dino Toppmöller (1 July 2016 – 30 June 2019)
- (Belgium) Emilio Ferrera (1 July 2019 – 17 September 2019 )
- (Belgium) Bertrand Crasson (17 September 2019 – 7 May 2020 )
- (Portugal) Carlos Fangueiro (1 July 2020 – 30 June 2023)
- (United States) Jamath Shoffner (1 July 2023 – unknown)
- (France) Mickael Almeida Pinto (3 December 2025 – 23 February 2026)
- (Luxembourg) Claudio Lombardelli (25 February 2026 – present)

== Women's team ==
F91 have a women's team, currently competing in the Dames Ligue 2, the 2nd tier of women's football in Luxembourg. In the 1997–98 season, the team won the Dames Ligue 1 title.
