= 2021–22 Luxembourg National Division =

Luxembourg National Division
- Season: 2021–22
- Dates: 7 August 2021 – 22 May 2022
- Champions: F91 Dudelange
- Relegated: RM Hamm Benfica; Rodange 91
- Champions League: F91 Dudelange
- Conference League: Differdange 03; Fola Esch; Racing Union
- Matches: 240
- Goals: 770 (3.21 per match)
- Top goalscorer: Dominik Stolz (19 goals)
- Biggest home win: Fola Esch 8–0 Rodange 91 (19 March 2022)
- Biggest away win: RM Hamm Benfica 1–9 Progrès Niederkorn (27 November 2021)
- Highest scoring: RM Hamm Benfica 1–9 Progrès Niederkorn (27 November 2021)
- Longest winning run: 7 matches Progrès Niederkorn
- Longest unbeaten run: 12 matches Progrès Niederkorn; UNA Strassen
- Longest winless run: 13 matches RM Hamm Benfica
- Longest losing run: 13 matches RM Hamm Benfica
- All statistics correct as of 19 March 2022.

The 2021–22 Luxembourg National Division season was the 108th of top-tier association football in Luxembourg. The season began on 7 August 2021 and ended on 22 May 2022. The league champion qualified to compete in the 2022–23 UEFA Champions League.

Fola Esch were the defending league champions.

== Teams ==
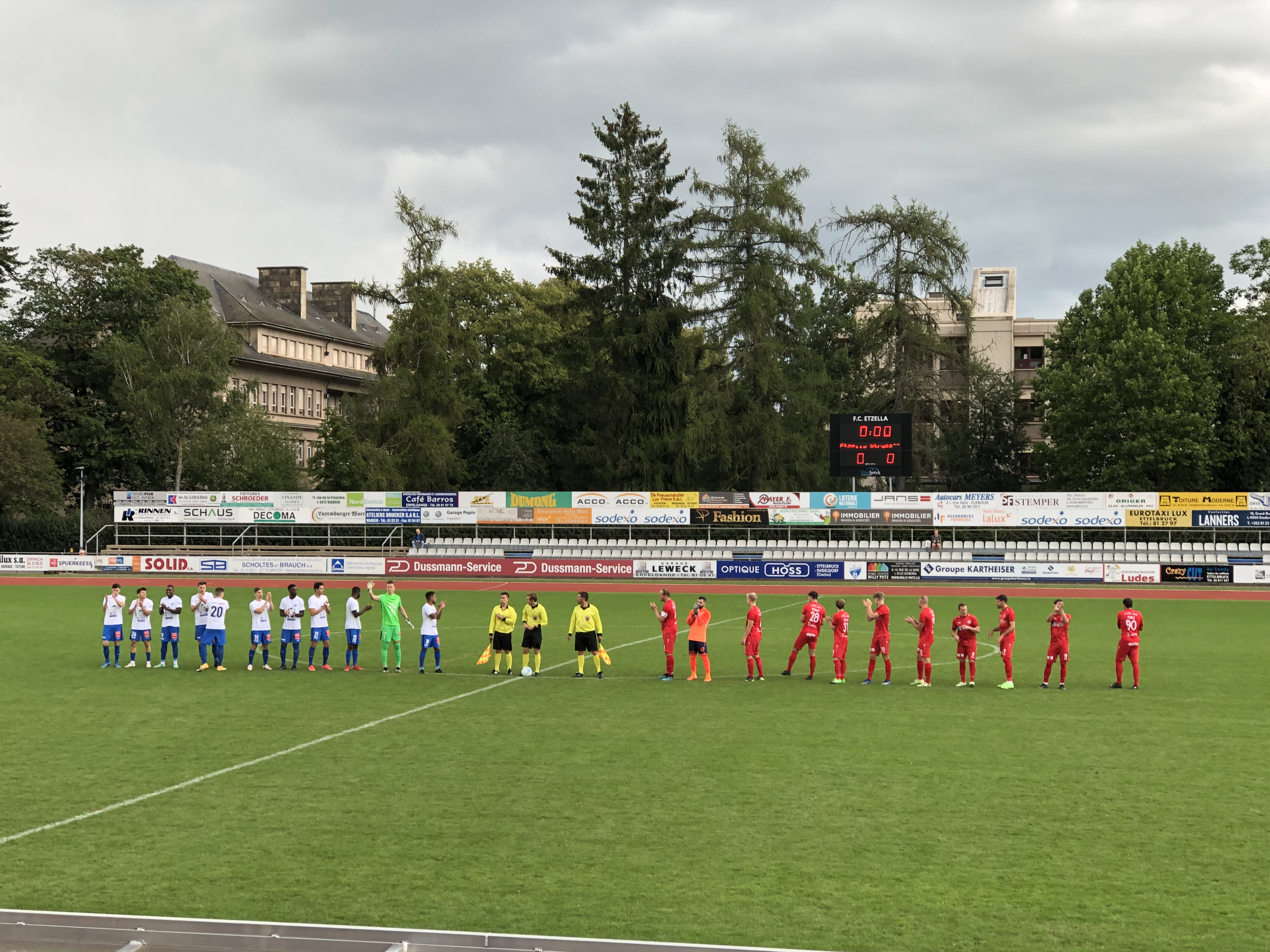
Etzella Ettelbruck lining up vs UNA Strassen on 22 August 2021

No teams had been relegated at the end of the previous season, and no teams were promoted from the Luxembourg Division of Honour.

=== Stadia and locations ===
Locations of the 2021–22 Luxembourg National Division teams

Team	Town	Venue	Capacity
Differdange 03	Differdange	Stade Municipal Ralf Jänisch	3,000
Etzella Ettelbruck	Ettelbruck	Stade Wëllem Durkheim	2,020
F91 Dudelange	Dudelange	Stade Jos Nosbaum	2,558
Fola Esch	Esch-sur-Alzette	Stade Émile Mayrisch	3,826
Hostert	Hostert	Stade Jos Becker	1,500
Jeunesse Esch	Esch-sur-Alzette	Stade Guillaume Schinker	4,000
Mondorf-les-Bains	Mondorf-les-Bains	Stade John Grün	3,600
Progrès Niederkorn	Niederkorn	Stade Jos Haupert	2,800
Racing FC	Luxembourg City	Stade Achille Hammerel	5,814
RM Hamm Benfica	Hamm, Luxembourg City	Stade Gauthier Letsch	2,800
Rodange	Rodange	Stade Joseph Philippart	3,400
Swift Hesperange	Hesperange	Stade Alphonse Theis	3,058
UNA Strassen	Strassen	Complexe Sportif Jean Wirtz	2,000
UT Pétange	Pétange	Stade Municipal Jérémy Schulz	2,400
Victoria Rosport	Rosport	Stade Wëllem Hess	1,000
Wiltz	Wiltz	Stade Christophe Turpel	3,000

== League table ==
Pos	Team	Pld	W	D	L	GF	GA	GD	Pts	Qualification or relegation
1	F91 Dudelange (C)	30	21	4	5	78	27	+51	67	Qualification for the Champions League first qualifying round
2	Differdange 03	30	19	5	6	58	28	+30	62	Qualification for the Europa Conference League first qualifying round
3	Fola Esch	30	18	8	4	64	37	+27	62	Qualification for the Europa Conference League first qualifying round
4	Swift Hesperange	30	18	6	6	61	26	+35	60	
5	Progrès Niederkorn	30	16	7	7	68	37	+31	55	
6	UNA Strassen	30	14	9	7	53	36	+17	51	
7	Racing Union	30	15	4	11	56	48	+8	49	Qualification for the Europa Conference League second qualifying round (Note: Racing Union qualified for the Europa Conference League second qualifying round as the 2021–22 Luxembourg Cup winners.)
8	Jeunesse Esch	30	14	5	11	44	30	+14	47	
9	Mondorf-les-Bains	30	10	7	13	38	44	−6	37	
10	Etzella Ettelbruck	30	12	1	17	45	66	−21	37	
11	Union Titus Pétange	30	10	5	15	40	41	−1	35	
12	Victoria Rosport	30	8	9	13	45	59	−14	33	
13	Wiltz 71 (O)	30	9	4	17	42	53	−11	31	Qualification for the relegation play-offs
14	Hostert (O)	30	8	6	16	42	63	−21	30	Qualification for the relegation play-offs
15	Rodange 91 (R)	30	6	1	23	23	70	−47	19	Relegation to the Luxembourg Division of Honour
16	RM Hamm Benfica (R)	30	1	1	28	13	105	−92	4	Relegation to the Luxembourg Division of Honour

Source: UEFA, Soccerway
Rules for classification: 1) Points; 2) Goal difference; 3) Matches won; 4) Head-to-head points; 5) Head-to-head goal difference; 6) Head-to-head goals scored; 7) Play-off.
(C) Champions; (O) Play-off winners; (R) Relegated

== Results ==
Home \ Away	DIF	ETZ	DUD	FOL	HOS	JEU	MON	PRO	RAC	RMH	ROD	SWI	UNA	UTP	VIC	WIL
Differdange 03	—	4–0	3–2	1–1	1–4	1–0	1–0	2–0	4–0	3–0	3–0	0–0	2–1	4–0	4–0	3–1
Etzella Ettelbruck	0–2	—	0–4	2–3	1–0	2–1	2–1	1–1	1–2	4–0	3–0	0–2	2–3	0–1	1–3	3–1
F91 Dudelange	1–0	6–1	—	2–3	2–2	1–0	2–1	1–2	1–1	7–0	5–1	1–0	1–1	3–1	4–1	3–0
Fola Esch	2–4	2–0	0–3	—	2–0	1–0	1–1	2–0	2–0	2–1	8–0	2–1	0–0	3–0	4–4	2–1
Hostert	0–0	3–2	1–3	2–4	—	0–3	1–1	0–4	1–4	1–0	3–1	1–3	1–1	0–1	1–3	1–3
Jeunesse Esch	0–0	5–1	0–3	3–3	4–3	—	1–0	0–1	0–2	5–0	1–0	1–0	1–2	1–0	2–0	1–0
Mondorf-les-Bains	3–3	2–1	0–1	2–0	0–3	1–5	—	2–1	2–3	3–2	0–1	1–2	1–1	2–1	3–1	2–0
Progrès Niederkorn	3–0	6–0	2–2	4–1	3–1	2–1	3–1	—	0–2	5–1	1–2	2–2	0–2	3–2	3–3	2–1
Racing FC	3–1	1–2	3–4	0–1	7–0	0–0	2–1	3–3	—	1–0	2–1	0–3	6–1	0–0	2–1	1–3
RM Hamm Benfica	0–1	1–3	0–4	0–7	0–6	1–3	0–1	1–9	2–4	—	1–2	0–4	0–4	0–3	1–0	0–6
Rodange 91	1–4	0–2	0–2	1–2	2–3	1–4	1–1	0–1	0–1	1–0	—	2–3	1–0	0–4	0–2	2–0
Swift Hesperange	3–0	5–2	1–0	1–1	0–2	1–1	2–1	1–1	2–0	7–0	2–0	—	0–1	0–2	1–1	3–2
UNA Strassen	0–1	2–3	3–1	2–2	4–0	0–0	0–1	2–1	3–0	4–0	4–1	0–2	—	2–2	2–2	3–2
Union Titus Pétange	1–2	4–1	0–1	0–1	3–0	0–1	1–1	0–0	4–2	3–1	3–0	0–3	1–2	—	0–3	0–1
Victoria Rosport	0–3	0–3	0–5	1–2	2–2	2–0	1–1	0–2	3–1	1–1	3–2	0–4	1–2	1–1	—	5–1
Wiltz	2–1	1–2	0–3	1–1	0–0	2–0	1–2	1–3	2–3	1–0	2–0	2–3	1–1	3–2	1–1	—

Source: Soccerway
Legend: Blue = home team win; Yellow = draw; Red = away team win.

== Relegation play-offs ==
Two play-off matches were played between the two bottom-placed teams from the 2021–22 Luxembourg National Division and two top-place contenders from the 2021–22 Luxembourg Division of Honour to determine which teams would participate in the 2022–23 Luxembourg National Division.

26 May 2022
19:30

FC Mamer 32	2–2 (a.e.t.)	Hostert
Penalties
	2–4

28 May 2022
16:00

Jeunesse Junglinster	1–1 (a.e.t.)	Wiltz 71
Penalties
	4–5

== Statistics ==
=== Top scorers ===
As of 19 March 2022

Rank	Player	Club	Goals
1	(Germany) Dominik Stolz	Swift Hesperange	19
2	(Belgium) Jordy Soladio	Victoria Rosport	17
3	(France) Nicolas Perez	UNA Strassen	15
4	(Portugal) Bertino Cabral	Differdange 03	13
5	(Germany) Andreas Buch	Differdange 03	12
5	(Luxembourg) Antonio Luisi	Progrès Niederkorn	12
5	(Republic of the Congo) Yann Mabella	Racing FC	12
5	(Luxembourg) Dejvid Sinani	Differdange 03	12
9	(Luxembourg) Artur Abreu	Union Titus Pétange	11
9	(Brazil) Gustavo	Etzella Ettelbruck	11
9	(Belgium) Mayron De Almeida	Progrès Niederkorn	11

== See also ==
- Luxembourg Cup
- Luxembourg Division of Honour
