= 2019–20 Luxembourg National Division =

Luxembourg National Division
- Season: 2019–20
- Dates: 3 August 2019 – 8 March 2020 (Remaining matches cancelled)
- Champions: not awarded
- Relegated: no relegation
- Champions League: Fola Esch
- Europa League: Progrès Niederkorn; Differdange 03; Union Titus Pétange
- Matches: 119
- Goals: 403 (3.39 per match)
- Top goalscorer: Danel Sinani (14 goals)
- Biggest home win: Fola Esch 5–0 Rodange 91 (3 November 2019)
- Biggest away win: Victoria Rosport 0–7 F91 Dudelange (29 September 2019)
- Highest scoring: Hostert 3–5 Progrès Niederkorn (11 August 2019)
- Longest winning run: 6 matches Differdange 03
- Longest unbeaten run: 13 matches Fola Esch
- Longest winless run: 12 matches Mondorf-les-Bains
- Longest losing run: 5 matches Hostert
- All statistics correct as of 8 March 2020.

The 2019–20 Luxembourg National Division was the 106th season of top-tier association football in Luxembourg. The season began on 3 August 2019 and the last matches were played on 8 March 2020.

F91 Dudelange were the defending champions of the league.

On 28 April 2020, the league was abandoned due to COVID-19 pandemic. The title was not awarded, and no teams were relegated, with the league expanded to 16 teams next season for a transitional year.

== Teams ==
RM Hamm Benfica and Rumelange were relegated after the previous season. Blue Boys Muhlenbach and Rodange 91 earned promotion from the Luxembourg Division of Honour and joined the league this season.

Locations of the 2019–20 Luxembourg National Division teams

=== Stadia and locations ===
Team	Town	Venue	Capacity
Blue Boys Muhlenbach	Muhlenbach	Stade Mathias Mamer	1,100
Differdange 03	Differdange	Stade Municipal de la Ville de Differdange	3,000
Etzella Ettelbruck	Ettelbruck	Stade Am Deich	2,020
F91 Dudelange	Dudelange	Stade Jos Nosbaum	2,558
Fola Esch	Esch-sur-Alzette	Stade Émile Mayrisch	3,826
Hostert	Hostert	Stade Jos Becker	1,500
Jeunesse Esch	Esch-sur-Alzette	Stade de la Frontière	5,090
Mondorf-les-Bains	Mondorf-les-Bains	Stade John Grün	3,600
Progrès Niederkorn	Niederkorn	Stade Jos Haupert	2,800
Racing FC	Luxembourg City	Stade Achille Hammerel	5,814
Rodange	Rodange	Stade Joseph Philippart	3,400
UNA Strassen	Strassen	Complexe Sportif Jean Wirtz	2,000
UT Pétange	Pétange	Stade Municipal	2,400
Victoria Rosport	Rosport	VictoriArena	1,000

== League table ==
Pos	Team	Pld	W	D	L	GF	GA	GD	Pts	Qualification or relegation
1	Fola Esch	17	12	3	2	41	17	+24	39	Qualification for the Champions League first qualifying round
2	Progrès Niederkorn	17	11	4	2	43	17	+26	37	Qualification for the Europa League first qualifying round
3	Differdange 03	17	11	2	4	36	25	+11	35	Qualification for the Europa League first qualifying round
4	Union Titus Pétange	17	10	3	4	34	23	+11	33	Qualification for the Europa League first qualifying round
5	F91 Dudelange	17	8	2	7	38	24	+14	26	
6	UNA Strassen	17	7	5	5	30	26	+4	26	
7	Racing FC	17	6	7	4	32	27	+5	25	
8	Jeunesse Esch	17	5	4	8	24	34	−10	19	
9	Victoria Rosport	17	5	3	9	23	35	−12	18	
10	Etzella Ettelbruck	17	5	2	10	22	34	−12	17	
11	Hostert	17	5	1	11	17	37	−20	16	
12	Mondorf-les-Bains	17	3	6	8	22	28	−6	15	
13	Rodange 91	17	4	3	10	21	37	−16	15	
14	Blue Boys Muhlenbach	17	3	3	11	20	39	−19	12	

Source: UEFA, Soccerway
Rules for classification: 1) Points; 2) Goal difference; 3) Matches won; 4) Head-to-head points; 5) Head-to-head goal difference; 6) Head-to-head goals scored; 7) Play-off.

== Results ==
Before the season, each team was expected to play every other team in the league twice for a total of 26 matches each.

Home \ Away	DIF	ETZ	DUD	FOL	HOS	JEU	MON	MUH	PRO	RAC	ROD	UNA	UTP	VIC
Differdange 03	—	2–1	0–3	—	3–1	—	1–1	—	1–5	—	2–1	4–1	2–3	—
Etzella Ettelbruck	0–3	—	1–4	0–1	0–1	—	1–3	—	0–4	—	5–2	3–2	1–2	—
F91 Dudelange	—	—	—	—	—	1–3	3–1	3–1	2–3	3–3	4–0	2–2	4–2	—
Fola Esch	1–2	3–1	2–1	—	—	—	—	4–2	2–0	—	5–0	2–1	2–0	—
Hostert	0–3	—	1–0	1–1	—	—	0–1	—	3–5	0–3	2–3	1–5	—	2–0
Jeunesse Esch	1–1	1–1	0–1	0–3	1–2	—	—	—	—	3–2	2–1	—	1–4	2–1
Mondorf-les-Bains	1–2	1–2	—	2–2	—	2–3	—	3–0	—	0–4	—	0–0	—	1–2
Blue Boys Muhlenbach	0–2	1–1	—	3–2	0–1	4–2	1–1	—	—	2–2	0–3	—	—	0–3
Progrès Niederkorn	—	—	2–0	—	4–0	4–0	2–2	5–2	—	1–2	1–0	0–0	—	2–1
Racing FC	3–2	0–3	1–0	2–2	2–1	1–1	—	—	1–1	—	—	—	2–3	2–2
Rodange 91	—	1–2	—	—	—	3–3	1–1	1–3	—	1–1	—	1–2	1–0	1–0
UNA Strassen	1–3	—	—	1–3	4–1	1–0	1–0	2–0	—	2–1	—	—	—	2–2
Union Titus Pétange	—	—	2–0	0–1	2–0	—	3–2	2–0	1–1	—	4–1	2–2	—	2–2
Victoria Rosport	2–3	3–0	0–7	0–4	—	2–1	—	2–1	0–3	—	—	—	1–2	—

Source: Soccerway
Legend: Blue = home team win; Yellow = draw; Red = away team win.

== Season statistics ==
=== Top scorers ===
As of 8 March 2020

Rank	Player	Club	Goals
1	(Luxembourg) Danel Sinani	F91 Dudelange	14
2	(Senegal) Moussa Seydi	Fola Esch	13
3	(France) Emmanuel Françoise	Progrès Niederkorn	11
3	(France) Yann Mabella	Racing FC	11
5	(Luxembourg) Artur Abreu	UT Pétange	10
6	(Germany) Aleksandar Biedermann	Victoria Rosport	8
6	(Italy) Martin Boakye	Jeunesse Esch	8
6	(Germany) Andreas Buch	Differdange 03	8
6	(Luxembourg) Ken Corral	Fola Esch	8
6	(Algeria) Eddire Mokrani	UT Pétange	8
6	(France) Benjamin Runser	UNA Strassen	8
6	(Germany) Sebastian Szimayer	UNA Strassen	8

== See also ==
- Luxembourg Cup
- Luxembourg Division of Honour
