= Loris Tinelli =

Luxembourgish footballer

Personal information
- Date of birth: 2 February 1999 (age 27)
- Place of birth: Esch-sur-Alzette, Luxembourg
- Height: 1.82 m (6 ft 0 in)
- Positions: Midfielder; winger

Team information
- Current team: Mondorf-les-Bains
- Number: 72

Youth career
- –2015: Kayl-Tétange
- 2015–2018: Anderlecht

Senior career*
Years	Team	Apps	(Gls)
2018–2019	Virton	0	(0)
2019–2022	Racing (Luxembourg)	69	(5)
2022–2023	YSCC Yokohama	27	(3)
2024	Racing FC	14	(4)
2024–	Mondorf-les-Bains	49	(13)
- * Club domestic league appearances and goals as of 6 June 2026

Loris Tinelli (born 2 February 1999) is a Luxembourgish footballer who plays as a midfielder or winger and currently plays for Mondorf-les-Bains.

== Career ==
As a youth player, Tinelli joined the youth academy of Luxembourgish second-tier side Kayl-Tétange. In 2015, he joined the youth academy of Anderlecht in the Belgian top flight. In 2018, Tinelli signed for Belgian club Virton. In 2019, he signed for Racing (Luxembourg) in Luxembourg, helping them win the 2021–22 Luxembourg Cup.

In 2022, he signed for Japanese team YSCC Yokohama. On 11 September 2022, Tinelli debuted for YSCC Yokohama during a 0–4 loss to SC Sagamihara. On 25 September 2022, he scored his first goal YSCC Yokohama during a 1–0 win over Matsumoto Yamaga FC. On 21 November 2022, he won the award for the best goal scorer of the year in the 2022 season.

== Career statistics ==
=== Club ===
As of the start of 2023 season.

Appearances and goals by club, season and competition
Club	Season	League			National cup		League cup		Total	
Club	Season	Division	Apps	Goals	Apps	Goals	Apps	Goals	Apps	Goals
Luxembourg			League		Luxembourg Cup		None		Total	
Racing Union	2019–20	Luxembourg National Division	13	1	2	4	–		15	5
Racing Union	2020–21	Luxembourg National Division	28	2	1	2	–		29	4
Racing Union	2021–22	Luxembourg National Division	28	2	4	1	–		32	3
Racing Union	Total		69	5	7	7	0	0	76	12
Japan			League		Emperor's Cup		J.League Cup		Total	
YSCC Yokohama	2022	J3 League	10	2	0	0	–		10	2
YSCC Yokohama	2023	J3 League	0	0	0	0	–		0	0
YSCC Yokohama	Total		10	2	0	0	0	0	10	2
Career total			79	7	7	7	0	0	86	14

== Honours ==
Individual

- J3 League Goal of the Year: 2022
