= 2022–23 Luxembourg National Division =

Luxembourg National Division
- Season: 2022–23
- Dates: 7 August 2022 – 21 May 2023
- Champions: Swift Hesperange
- Relegated: Etzella Ettelbruck; Hostert
- Champions League: Swift Hesperange
- Conference League: FC Differdange 03; Progrès Niederkorn; F91 Dudelange
- Matches: 240
- Goals: 726 (3.03 per match)
- Top goalscorer: Rayan Philippe (29 goals)
- Biggest home win: Swift Hesperange 8–1 Fola Esch (18 September 2022)
- Biggest away win: UN Käerjéng 97 0–8 Differdange 03 (8 April 2023)
- Highest scoring: Swift Hesperange 8–1 Fola Esch (18 September 2022)
- Longest winning run: 10 matches F91 Dudelange
- Longest unbeaten run: 19 matches Progrès Niederkorn
- Longest winless run: 16 matches UN Käerjéng 97
- Longest losing run: 6 matches Fola Esch; Etzella Ettelbruck
- All statistics correct as of 30 April 2023.

The 2022–23 Luxembourg National Division season, also known as BGL Ligue, for sponsorship reasons, was the 109th of top-tier association football in Luxembourg. The season began on 7 August 2022 and will end on 21 May 2023. The league champion qualified to compete in the 2023–24 UEFA Champions League.

F91 Dudelange were the defending league champions, their 16th title.

The league is notable for being one of the few top-flight leagues to use the three substitute rule for the duration of the 2022-23 season, and the only top-flight men's European league to use the rule within the period.

== Teams ==
Rodange 91 and RM Hamm Benfica were relegated at the end of the previous season, while Mondercange and UN Käerjéng 97 were promoted from the Luxembourg Division of Honour.

=== Stadia and locations ===
Locations of the 2022–23 Luxembourg National Division teams

Team	Town	Venue	Capacity
Differdange 03	Differdange	Stade Municipal Ralf Jänisch	3,000
Etzella Ettelbruck	Ettelbruck	Stade Wëllem Durkheim	2,020
F91 Dudelange	Dudelange	Stade Jos Nosbaum	2,558
Fola Esch	Esch-sur-Alzette	Stade Émile Mayrisch	3,826
Hostert	Hostert	Stade Jos Becker	1,500
Jeunesse Esch	Esch-sur-Alzette	Stade Guillaume Schinker	4,000
Mondercange	Mondercange	Stade Communal, Mondercange	3,300
Mondorf-les-Bains	Mondorf-les-Bains	Stade John Grün	3,600
Progrès Niederkorn	Niederkorn	Stade Jos Haupert	2,800
Racing FC	Luxembourg City	Stade Achille Hammerel	5,814
Swift Hesperange	Hesperange	Stade Alphonse Theis	3,058
UN Käerjéng 97	Bascharage	Stade um Bëchel	1,000
UNA Strassen	Strassen	Complexe Sportif Jean Wirtz	2,000
UT Pétange	Pétange	Stade Municipal Jérémy Schulz	2,400
Victoria Rosport	Rosport	Stade Wëllem Hess	1,000
Wiltz	Wiltz	Stade Christophe Turpel	3,000

== League table ==
Pos	Team	Pld	W	D	L	GF	GA	GD	Pts	Qualification or relegation
1	Swift Hesperange (C)	30	24	5	1	100	28	+72	77	Qualification for the Champions League first qualifying round
2	Progrès Niederkorn	30	22	4	4	67	31	+36	70	Qualification to Europa Conference League first qualifying round
3	F91 Dudelange	30	22	1	7	86	38	+48	67	Qualification to Europa Conference League first qualifying round
4	Union Titus Pétange	30	18	5	7	62	38	+24	59	
5	Differdange 03	30	14	3	13	60	43	+17	45	Qualification to Europa Conference League second qualifying round (Note: Differdange 03 qualified to the Europa Conference League second qualifying round as Cup Winners.)
6	Mondorf-les-Bains	30	14	3	13	52	52	0	45	
7	Jeunesse Esch	30	12	7	11	44	39	+5	43	
8	Racing Union	30	11	10	9	43	39	+4	43	
9	UNA Strassen	30	12	3	15	33	46	−13	39	
10	Wiltz 71	30	10	6	14	48	59	−11	36	
11	Victoria Rosport	30	8	8	14	48	58	−10	32	
12	Mondercange	30	7	8	15	41	55	−14	29	
13	Fola Esch (O)	30	8	2	20	36	71	−35	26	Qualification for the relegation play-offs
14	UN Käerjéng 97 (O)	30	5	10	15	30	69	−39	25	Qualification for the relegation play-offs
15	Etzella Ettelbruck (R)	30	6	5	19	32	71	−39	23	Relegation to the Luxembourg Division of Honour
16	Hostert (R)	30	4	6	20	20	65	−45	18	Relegation to the Luxembourg Division of Honour

Source: UEFA, Soccerway
Rules for classification: 1) Points; 2) Goal difference; 3) Matches won; 4) Head-to-head points; 5) Head-to-head goal difference; 6) Head-to-head goals scored; 7) Play-off.
(C) Champions; (O) Play-off winners; (R) Relegated

== Results ==
Home \ Away	DIF	ETZ	DUD	FOL	HOS	JEU	MND	MON	PRO	RAC	SWI	UNK	UNA	UTP	VIC	WIL
Differdange 03	—	6–0	0–4	6–0	1–0	0–2	2–0	2–1	2–3	2–3	1–2	2–2	0–1	1–1	4–0	2–1
Etzella Ettelbruck	0–2	—	2–5	0–4	1–1	3–0	1–2	0–3	0–1	0–1	0–4	1–1	3–0	2–0	1–5	1–2
F91 Dudelange	3–1	4–0	—	2–1	3–1	5–0	5–1	4–0	1–4	0–1	0–4	4–0	3–1	0–1	2–0	1–1
Fola Esch	3–2	0–0	0–2	—	0–1	1–3	2–0	0–1	0–4	1–1	0–1	3–2	2–1	1–2	4–1	1–2
Hostert	0–5	0–3	0–4	0–1	—	0–1	0–0	2–5	1–0	1–1	0–4	0–1	1–0	0–2	1–3	2–3
Jeunesse Esch	1–0	6–0	4–2	3–1	1–2	—	1–1	0–2	0–1	1–1	1–1	0–0	2–0	2–2	2–0	1–0
Mondercange	0–0	1–2	2–3	3–0	1–0	1–2	—	1–2	3–3	0–1	1–2	1–1	0–0	4–1	5–1	0–3
Mondorf-les-Bains	0–1	3–0	0–7	5–0	2–0	3–1	4–1	—	0–1	0–1	0–4	1–1	1–2	2–0	1–6	3–0
Progrès Niederkorn	2–0	3–1	2–3	3–2	6–0	2–1	4–0	4–2	—	0–0	2–2	1–0	2–1	2–3	1–0	3–0
Racing Union	0–1	2–2	2–4	4–2	2–1	2–1	2–2	1–0	1–2	—	1–3	1–1	0–1	0–2	2–2	0–1
Swift Hesperange	4–0	2–2	4–3	8–1	5–1	2–0	2–1	4–2	4–2	2–0	—	4–2	3–0	3–3	5–1	4–2
UN Käerjéng 97	0–8	0–3	2–4	3–2	0–0	1–4	2–2	0–2	1–1	0–5	0–6	—	1–2	0–1	2–1	1–1
UNA Strassen	3–2	4–1	1–2	1–0	2–0	2–1	2–0	0–1	0–1	1–4	0–4	0–2	—	0–3	2–2	4–3
Union Titus Pétange	4–2	3–2	1–2	2–3	4–1	0–0	5–2	4–1	0–2	1–1	2–1	4–1	0–1	—	5–1	2–1
Victoria Rosport	2–3	3–1	2–1	3–0	2–2	1–1	1–2	1–1	2–3	4–2	0–0	3–0	0–0	0–2	—	0–0
Wiltz 71	1–2	3–0	0–3	5–1	2–2	3–2	1–4	4–4	1–2	1–1	0–6	2–3	2–1	0–2	3–1	—

Updated to match(es) played on 14 May 2023. Source: Soccerway
Legend: Blue = home team win; Yellow = draw; Red = away team win.

== Relegation play-offs ==
Two play-off matches were played between the two bottom-placed teams from the 2022–23 Luxembourg National Division and the two top placed challengers from the 2022–23 Luxembourg Division of Honour to determine which teams would participate in the 2023–24 Luxembourg National Division.

25 May 2023
19:30

FC Jeunesse Canach	3–4 (a.e.t.)	Fola Esch

27 May 2023
19:00

SC Bettembourg	2–3	UN Käerjéng 97

== Statistics ==
=== Top scorers ===
As of 30 April 2023

Rank	Player	Club	Goals
1	(France) Rayan Philippe	Swift Hesperange	29
2	(Germany) Dominik Stolz	Swift Hesperange	26
3	(France) Elias Filet	Progrès Niederkorn	20
4	(France) Samir Hadji	F91 Dudelange	18
4	(Luxembourg) Dejvid Sinani	F91 Dudelange	18
6	(Germany) Kempes Tekiela	Union Titus Pétange	17
7	(Brazil) João Magno	F91 Dudelange	15
8	(Morocco) El Hassane M'Barki	Mondercange	14
9	(Luxembourg) Artur Abreu	Union Titus Pétange	13
10	(Angola) Érico Castro	Differdange 03	12

== Streaming ==
Almost all matches (95%+) from the 2022-23 season were streamed live on RTL.

== See also ==
- Luxembourg Cup
- Luxembourg Division of Honour
