= Fabrice Yao =

Footballer (born 1995)

Personal information
- Full name: Fabrice Yao Kan
- Date of birth: 29 December 1995 (age 30)
- Place of birth: Abidjan, Ivory Coast
- Height: 1.84 m (6 ft 0 in)
- Positions: Attacking midfielder; centre forward

Team information
- Current team: Luxembourg City

Senior career*
Years	Team	Apps	(Gls)
2014–2015	Stade Tunisien	0	(0)
2015–2016	Voltigeurs de Châteaubriant		
2016–2019	Mondorf-les-Bains	55	(11)
2017–2018	→ RM Hamm Benfica (loan)	20	(4)
2019–2021	Swift Hesperange	2	(0)
2021–2024	Mondorf-les-Bains	19	(1)
2024–	Luxembourg City	57	(6)

International career
2020–	Niger	3	(0)
- * Club domestic league appearances and goals as of 13 June 2026

Fabrice Yao Kan (born 29 December 1995) is a professional footballer who plays as an attacking midfielder and centre forward for Luxembourg Division of Honour club Luxembourg City.

== Early life ==
Born in Ivory Coast, he plays for the Niger National Team.

== Honours ==
Mondorf-les-Bains

- Luxembourg Cup runner-up: 2015–16
