= Jan Ostrowski =

Luxembourgish footballer (born 1999)

Personal information
- Date of birth: 14 April 1999 (age 27)
- Place of birth: Luxembourg City, Luxembourg
- Height: 1.90 m (6 ft 3 in)
- Position: Midfielder

Team information
- Current team: Gulf United
- Number: 73

Youth career
- Mondercange
- –2014: Racing Luxembourg
- 2014–2017: Mainz 05
- 2017–2018: Eintracht Frankfurt

Senior career*
Years	Team	Apps	(Gls)
2018–2019	FC Zürich II	18	(0)
2019–2020	Miedź Legnica	2	(0)
2019–2020	Miedź Legnica II	3	(0)
2020–2021	Sona	0	(0)
2021	Hamm Benfica	16	(0)
2021–2023	Swift Hesperange	10	(0)
2023–2024	Fleetwood United	14	(0)
2024–2025	Dubai City		
2025–	Gulf United		

International career
2013	Luxembourg U15	1	(0)
2014–2015	Luxembourg U17	5	(1)
2015	Poland U17	2	(0)
2016	Luxembourg U19	4	(0)
2017–2020	Luxembourg U21	9	(0)
2017	Luxembourg	2	(0)
- * Club domestic league appearances and goals as of 27 June 2023

Jan Ostrowski (born 14 April 1999) is a Luxembourgish professional footballer who plays for Gulf United as a midfielder.

== Club career ==
Ostrowski previously featured for the youth sides of Mainz 05, Eintracht Frankfurt and FC Zürich.

In the summer of 2019, Ostrowski joined Polish side Miedź Legnica.

== International career ==
Ostrowski was born in Luxembourg and is of Polish descent. He made his international debut for Luxembourg in 2017 in a friendly against Albania.

== Honours ==
Swift Hesperange

- Luxembourg National Division: 2022–23

Fleetwood United

- UAE Second Division League: 2023–24
