= Forkel =

Forkel is a surname. Notable people with the surname include:

- Johann Nikolaus Forkel (1749–1818), German musician and music theorist
- Karen Forkel (born 1970), German track and field athlete
- Martin Forkel (born 1979), German soccer defender
