= Fahrudin Kuduzović =

Bosnian footballer (born 1984)

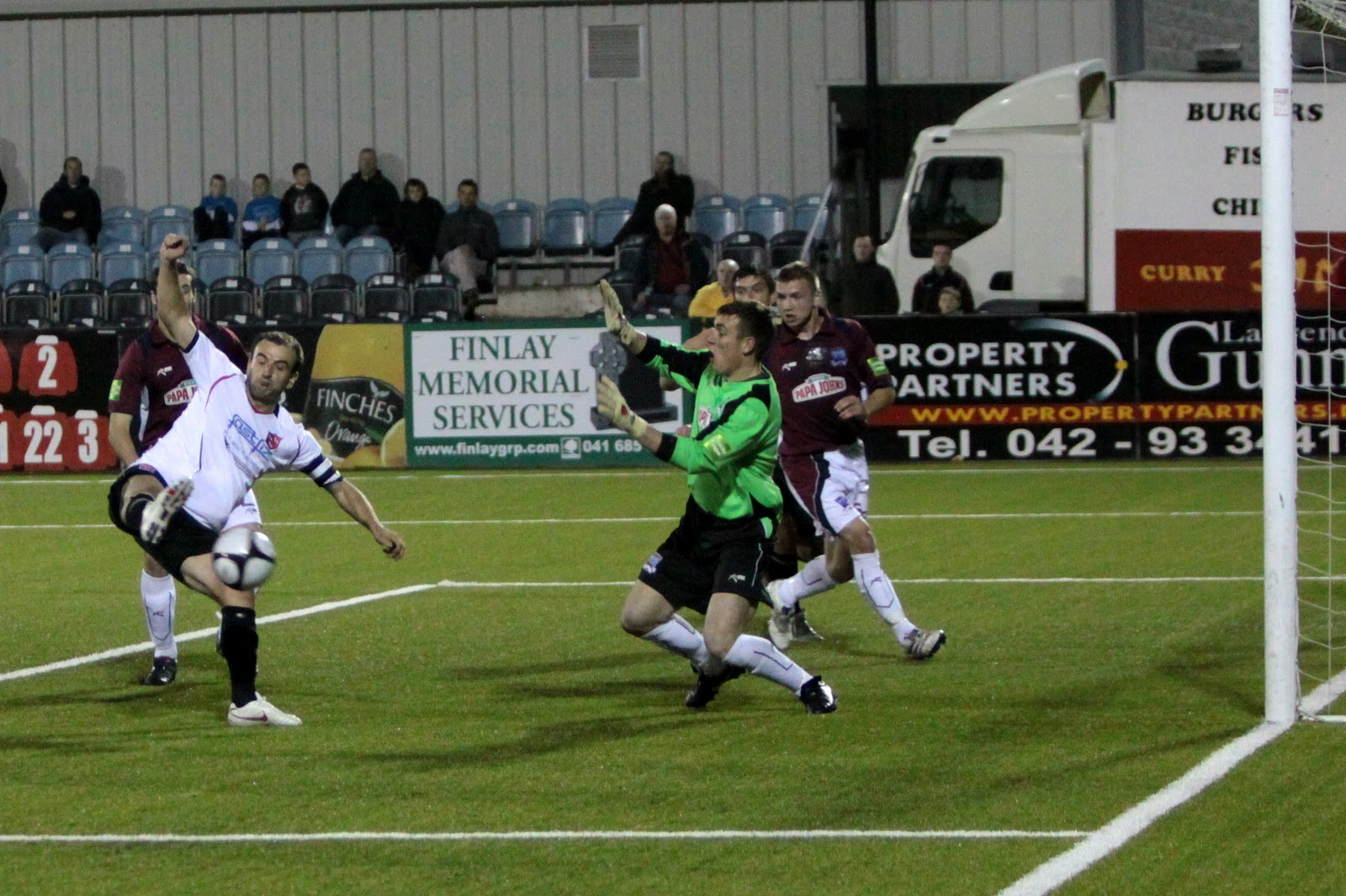
- Kuduzović scores against Galway United in 2010

Personal information
- Date of birth: 10 October 1984 (age 42)
- Place of birth: Vlasenica, SFR Yugoslavia
- Height: 1.83 m (6 ft 0 in)
- Position: Striker

Youth career
- 1995–1996: Leicester City
- 1996–2004: Derby County

Senior career*
| Years | Team | Apps | (Gls) |
| 2004–2005 | Notts County | 3 | (0) |
| 2004 | Sligo Rovers | 1 | (0) |
| 2005–2008 | Drogheda United | 108 | (15) |
| 2008 | Cork City | 15 | (3) |
| 2009 | Dundalk | 31 | (8) |
| 2010 | Eintracht Trier | 35 | (12) |
| 2010–2014 | US Mondorf | 113 | (20) |

Managerial career
- 2018: Blue Boys Muhlenbach (caretaker)
- 2018–2019: Blue Boys Muhlenbach
- 2019–2022: Eintracht Trier (assistant)
- 2022–2023: Racing-Union
- 2025-2026: RW Wittlich
- 2026-: Rodange 91
- * Club domestic league appearances and goals

Fahrudin "Faz" Kuduzović (born 10 October 1984) is a Bosnian-British retired footballer who last played in the Luxembourg Division of Honour and is the current manager of Rodange 91 in Luxembourg. He played either as a striker or as an attacking midfielder.

== Early life ==
Kuduzović left Bosnia in 1992 and moved to the United Kingdom where he settled in Leicester.

== Playing career ==
Within a year of emigrating to Britain, Kuduzović was spotted by Leicester City at a tournament. He played for the Foxes for a year before being picked up by Derby County. Kuduzović would go on to spend eight years in the Derby academy, earning a full-time contract before he had even left school. However, in his final three years at the club, he only played for the reserve team football, with his failure to make a breakthrough to the first team leading to his exit in 2004. He had a trial with Port Vale in July 2024. He signed for Notts County and made his first-team debut within days. However, halfway through the season, Gary Mills, who had signed Kuduzović, was sacked, and the Bosnian was unable to find favour under new player-manager Ian Richardson.

At the end of the season, Kuduzović admitted that he "wanted to get away" and on 25 January 2005 he completed a move to Irish club Sligo Rovers, then managed by Sean Connor in the League of Ireland First Division. In his first season at the Showgrounds, Kuduzović helped the club to the league title which saw them win promotion back to the top flight for the first time in six years. The striker continued to impress in his performances in the Premier Division as Sligo achieved a credible fifth-placed finish in their first year back in the Irish top flight. Twelve months later, he finished as the Bit O' Red's top scorer with ten league goals as they ended the season in sixth.

However, midway through the 2008 campaign, he left to join reigning champions Drogheda United for an undisclosed fee. It was a spell that started very brightly as, 15 days later, he scored the winning goal against Levadia Tallinn in the home leg of their UEFA Champions League first qualifying round tie. In the second round, the Boynesiders went within the width of a post of knocking Ukrainian giants Dynamo Kyiv out. However, a disappointing second half to the season saw them enter examinership due to financial troubles, with a ten-point deduction leaving them in eighth place in the final table. Kuduzović, who scored three goals in his time at United Park, was the subject of interest from Connor once more when the Belfast-born boss tried to persuade the striker to join Dundalk at the beginning of last year. However, on 27 January 2009, Kuduzović followed former Drogheda manager Paul Doolin to Cork City and he finished as the club's top scorer with nine goals as they ended the season in third – their highest league position since winning the title in 2005.

On 25 February last, shortly after the demise of Cork, Faz signed for Dundalk, and eight days later he made his debut for the Lilywhites when playing the full 90 minutes of their 1–0 win at Bray Wanderers on the opening day of the league campaign. The following weekend, on his first ever outing at Oriel Park, in his first Louth Derby, Faz scored a late equaliser against Drogheda as Dundalk came from 2–0 down to snatch an unlikely draw. In July, Kuduzović became the first Dundalk player to score on the European stage in almost 19 years when he netted against Grevenmacher in Stade Josy Barthel, Luxembourg. He struck again in the second leg at Oriel Park a week later to write his name into the history books as the first ever foreign player to score in both legs of a European tie for the club, as 2010 saw them compete in their 44th European game as they eventually bowed out to Levski Sofia in the UEFA Europa League second qualifying round. On 1 October 2010, Kuduzović scored his first career hat-trick with three second-half goals in a 3–0 win against Galway United at Oriel Park. He ended the season with 16 goals in all competitions, his highest ever return in a single season, to become Dundalk's most prolific scorer in the Premier Division since Peter Hanrahan in 1991.

On 17 December 2010, Eintracht Trier announced that Kuduzović had signed for them, on a deal which will keep him at Moselstadion until at least 30 June 2011. He played over 100 league games for the club.

After leaving Eintracht Trier in 2014, Kuduzović moved to Luxembourg to play for FC RM Hamm Benfica and US Mondorf before moving to current club, Blue Boys Muhlenbach.

== Coaching career ==
Following the departure of Portuguese coach Paulo Gomes on 20 February 2018, Faz took over Blue Boys Muhlenbach as caretaker manager for the rest of the season. He was later confirmed as the manager for the 2018–19 season.

On 13 May 2019 Eintracht Trier confirmed, that Faz would be returning to the club as assistant manager to his former teammate Josef Çınar for the 2019–20 season.

In February 2026 Kuduzović returned to Luxembourg to manager National Division side Rodange 91.

== Managerial statistics ==
As of 28 April 2023

Managerial record by team and tenure
| Team | Nat. | From | To | Record | | | | |
| Team | Nat. | From | To | G | W | D | L | Win % |
|---|---|---|---|---|---|---|---|---|
| Blue Boys Muhlenbach (caretaker) | (Luxembourg) | 20 February 2018 | 30 June 2018 | 13 | 6 | 2 | 5 | 46.15 |
| Blue Boys Muhlenbach | (Luxembourg) | 1 July 2018 | 30 June 2019 | 30 | 21 | 5 | 4 | 70.00 |
| Racing-Union | (Luxembourg) | 1 July 2022 | 28 April 2023 | 27 | 12 | 7 | 8 | 44.44 |
| Total | | | | 70 | 39 | 14 | 17 | 55.71 |

== Honours ==
Sligo Rovers

- League of Ireland First Division: 2005
