= Lilian Fournier =

French footballer (born 1998)

Personal information
- Date of birth: 18 May 1998 (age 28)
- Place of birth: Forbach, France
- Height: 1.66 m (5 ft 5 in)
- Position: Right winger

Team information
- Current team: Mondorf-les-Bains
- Number: 9

Senior career*
Years	Team	Apps	(Gls)
2015–2019	Metz B	17	(2)
2017–2019	Metz	1	(0)
2019–2020	Sedan	18	(0)
2020–2021	Beauvais	2	(0)
2021–2023	Sarre-Union	33	(5)
2023–2024	Blois	34	(6)
2024–	Mondorf-les-Bains	55	(16)
- * Club domestic league appearances and goals as of 13 June 2026

Lilian Fournier (born 18 May 1998) is a French professional footballer who plays as a right winger for Luxembourg National Division club Mondorf-les-Bains.

== Career ==
Fournier made his debut for the Ligue 1 side in a 3–1 loss to Saint-Étienne on 14 October 2017. In January 2019, he moved to Sedan.
