= FC Dinamo București in European football =

- Club: Dinamo București
- First entry: 1956–57 European Cup
- Latest entry: 2017–18 UEFA Europa League

Fotbal Club Dinamo București is a Romanian professional football club based in Bucharest.

== Total statistics ==
As of August 3, 2017.

Competition	S	P	W	D	L	GF	GA	GD
UEFA Champions League / European Cup	18	66	23	11	32	96	106	–10
UEFA Cup Winners' Cup / European Cup Winners' Cup	5	20	8	4	8	25	18	+7
UEFA Europa League / UEFA Cup	23	90	37	14	39	147	127	+20
Inter-Cities Fairs Cup	1	4	1	1	2	6	5	+1
UEFA Intertoto Cup	1	4	1	0	3	4	6	–2
Total	48	184	70	30	84	278	262	+16

== Statistics by country ==
As of 3 August 2017.

Country	Club	P	W	D	L	GF	GA	GD
Albania	KF Tirana	2	0	0	2	1	3	– 2
Albania	Dinamo Tirana	4	3	0	1	6	2	+ 4
Subtotal		6	3	0	3	7	5	+ 2
Austria	Sturm Graz	2	2	0	0	3	1	+ 2
Subtotal		2	2	0	0	3	1	+ 2
Belarus / Soviet Union	Dinamo Minsk	2	1	1	0	2	1	+ 1
Subtotal		2	1	1	0	2	1	+ 1
Belgium	Club Brugge	3	0	1	2	2	5	– 3
Belgium	Mechelen	2	0	0	2	0	3	– 3
Belgium	Anderlecht	2	0	0	2	0	2	– 2
Subtotal		7	0	1	6	2	10	– 8
Bulgaria	CSKA Sofia	2	1	0	1	4	10	– 6
Bulgaria	Levski Sofia	5	1	1	3	5	5	0
Subtotal		7	2	1	4	9	15	– 6
Croatia	Hajduk Split	2	1	0	1	3	4	– 1
Croatia	NK Varaždin	2	1	1	0	4	3	+ 1
Subtotal		4	2	1	1	7	7	0
Cyprus	Omonia Nicosia	4	2	0	2	9	6	+ 3
Cyprus	Alki Larnaca	2	2	0	0	12	0	+ 12
Subtotal		6	4	0	2	21	6	+ 15
Czech Republic / Czechoslovakia	Dukla Prague	2	1	0	1	3	2	+ 1
Czech Republic / Czechoslovakia	Slovan Liberec	2	1	0	1	3	3	0
Subtotal		4	2	0	2	6	5	+ 1
Denmark	Boldklubben 1909	2	2	0	0	7	2	+ 5
Subtotal		2	2	0	0	7	2	+ 5
England	Aston Villa	2	0	0	2	2	6	– 4
England	Everton	2	1	0	1	5	2	+ 3
England	Liverpool	4	0	1	3	2	7	– 5
England	Manchester United	2	0	0	2	1	5	– 4
England	Tottenham Hotspur	1	0	0	1	1	3	– 2
England	West Bromwich Albion	2	0	1	1	1	5	– 4
Subtotal		13	1	2	10	12	28	– 16
Finland	FC Lahti	6	5	0	1	12	1	+ 11
Finland	FF Jaro	1	0	0	1	0	2	– 2
Subtotal		7	5	0	2	12	3	+ 9
France	Guingamp	1	0	0	1	1	2	– 1
France	Bordeaux	2	0	1	1	1	2	– 1
France	Marseille	3	0	1	2	1	4	– 3
Subtotal		6	0	2	4	3	8	– 5
(Georgia (country)) Georgia	FC Kolkheti-1913 Poti	1	1	0	0	2	0	+ 2
Subtotal		1	1	0	0	2	0	+ 2
Germany / East Germany / West Germany	1. FC Köln	2	0	1	1	3	4	– 1
Germany / East Germany / West Germany	Bayer 04 Leverkusen	1	1	0	0	2	1	+ 1
Germany / East Germany / West Germany	Eintracht Frankfurt	2	1	0	1	2	3	– 1
Germany / East Germany / West Germany	FC Carl Zeiss Jena	2	2	0	0	3	0	+ 3
Germany / East Germany / West Germany	Hamburger SV	2	1	0	1	5	3	+ 2
Subtotal		9	5	1	3	15	11	+ 4
Greece	PAOK	2	1	0	1	5	1	+4
Greece	Panathinaikos	4	2	0	2	8	5	+ 3
Greece	Skoda Xanthi	2	2	0	0	8	4	+ 4
Subtotal		8	5	0	3	21	10	+ 11
Iceland	Knattspyrnufélag Reykjavíkur	2	0	0	2	1	4	– 3
Subtotal		2	0	0	2	1	4	– 3
Israel	Beitar Jerusalem	2	1	1	0	2	1	+ 1
Subtotal		2	1	1	0	2	1	+ 1
Italy	Milan	2	0	1	1	1	2	– 1
Italy	Cagliari Calcio	2	1	0	1	3	4	– 1
Italy	Inter Milano	6	2	1	3	6	13	– 7
Italy	Genoa	2	0	1	1	3	5	– 2
Italy	Lazio	2	0	1	1	2	4	– 2
Italy	Sampdoria	2	0	2	0	1	1	0
Subtotal		16	3	6	7	16	29	– 13
Latvia	FK Liepājas Metalurgs	2	1	1	0	6	3	+ 3
Subtotal		2	1	1	0	6	3	+ 3
Luxembourg	FC Mondercange	2	2	0	0	13	2	+ 11
Subtotal		2	2	0	0	13	2	+ 11
Malta	Hibernians F.C.	2	2	0	0	9	1	+ 8
Malta	Sliema Wanderers F.C.	2	2	0	0	7	0	+ 7
Subtotal		4	4	0	0	16	1	+ 15
Moldova	FC Olimpia	2	2	0	0	7	1	+ 6
Subtotal		2	2	0	0	7	1	+ 6
Netherlands	Feyenoord	2	0	0	2	0	5	– 5
Netherlands	N.E.C.	2	0	1	1	0	1	– 1
Netherlands	SC Heerenveen	1	0	1	0	0	0	0
Subtotal		5	0	2	3	0	6	– 6
Northern Ireland	Crusaders F.C.	2	2	0	0	12	0	+ 12
Subtotal		2	2	0	0	12	0	+ 12
Norway	Vålerenga Fotball	2	1	0	1	4	3	+ 1
Subtotal		2	1	0	1	4	3	+ 1
Poland	Polonia Warsaw	2	0	0	2	4	7	– 3
Subtotal		2	0	0	2	4	7	– 3
Portugal	Porto	2	0	1	1	0	4	– 4
Portugal	Benfica	4	1	0	3	2	5	– 3
Portugal	Sporting CP	2	1	0	1	2	1	+ 1
Subtotal		8	2	1	5	4	10	– 6
Republic of Ireland	St Patrick's Athletic F.C.	2	1	1	0	5	1	+ 4
Subtotal		2	1	1	0	5	1	+ 4
(North Macedonia) Republic of Macedonia / (Socialist Federal Republic of Yugoslavia) SFRY	FK Vardar	2	1	0	1	2	2	0
Subtotal		2	1	0	1	2	2	0
Russia	FC Spartak Moscow	2	1	0	1	3	5	– 2
Russia	PFC CSKA Moscow	1	1	0	0	1	0	+ 1
Subtotal		3	2	0	1	4	5	– 1
Scotland	Dundee United F.C.	2	1	1	0	2	1	+ 1
Subtotal		2	1	1	0	2	1	+ 1
Serbia / Serbia and Montenegro / (Socialist Federal Republic of Yugoslavia) SFRY	FK Partizan	4	2	1	1	5	4	+ 1
Serbia / Serbia and Montenegro / (Socialist Federal Republic of Yugoslavia) SFRY	FK Zemun	1	0	0	1	1	2	– 1
Subtotal		5	2	1	2	6	6	0
Slovakia / Czechoslovakia	FC Spartak Trnava	2	0	2	0	2	2	0
Slovakia / Czechoslovakia	MŠK Žilina	2	2	0	0	2	0	+ 2
Subtotal		4	2	2	0	4	2	+ 2
Spain	Athletic Bilbao	2	0	1	1	1	4	– 3
Spain	Atlético Madrid	4	1	1	2	4	7	– 3
Spain	Real Madrid	4	1	0	3	6	12	– 6
Subtotal		10	2	2	6	11	23	– 12
Sweden	IF Elfsborg	2	1	0	1	2	2	0
Sweden	IFK Göteborg	2	0	0	2	1	4	– 3
Subtotal		4	1	0	3	3	6	– 3
Switzerland	Grasshopper Club Zürich	2	0	0	2	2	6	– 4
Subtotal		2	0	0	2	2	6	– 4
Turkey	Beşiktaş	1	1	0	0	2	1	+ 1
Turkey	Boluspor	2	2	0	0	4	0	+ 4
Turkey	Galatasaray	6	1	1	4	6	14	– 8
Turkey	Trabzonspor	2	0	1	1	4	5	– 1
Subtotal		11	4	2	5	16	20	– 4
Ukraine	Metalist Kharkiv	2	0	0	2	1	4	– 3
Ukraine	Shakhtar Donetsk	2	2	0	0	5	2	+ 3
Ukraine	Vorskla Poltava	2	0	0	2	3	5	– 2
Subtotal		6	2	0	4	9	11	– 2
Total		184	70	30	84	278	262	+ 16

== Statistics by competition ==
=== UEFA Champions League / European Cup ===
Season	Round	Country	Club	Home	Away	Aggregate
1956–57	Preliminary round	Turkey	Galatasaray	3 – 1	1 – 2	4 – 3
1956–57	First round	Bulgaria	CDNA Sofia	3 – 2	1 – 8	4 – 10
1962–63	Preliminary round	Turkey	Galatasaray	1 – 1	0 – 3	1 – 4
1963–64	Preliminary round	East Germany	Motor Jena	2 – 0	1 – 0	3 – 0
1963–64	First round	Spain	Real Madrid	1 – 3	3 – 5	4 – 8
1964–65	Preliminary round	Malta	Sliema Wanderers	5 – 0	2 – 0	7 – 0
1964–65	First round	Italy	Internazionale	0 – 1	0 – 6	0 – 7
1965–66	Preliminary round	Denmark	Boldklubben 1909	4 – 0	3 – 2	7 – 2
1965–66	First round	Italy	Internazionale	2 – 1	0 – 2	2 – 3
1971–72	First round	Czechoslovakia	Spartak Trnava	0 – 0	2 – 2	(a) 2 – 2
1971–72	Second round	Netherlands	Feyenoord	0 – 3	0 – 2	0 – 5
1973–74	First round	Northern Ireland	Crusaders	11 – 0	1 – 0	12 – 0
1973–74	Second round	Spain	Atlético Madrid	0 – 2	2 – 2	2 – 4
1975–76	First round	Spain	Real Madrid	1 – 0	1 – 4	2 – 4
1977–78	First round	Spain	Atlético Madrid	2 – 1	0 – 2	2 – 3
1982–83	Preliminary round	Norway	Vålerenga	3 – 1	1 – 2	4 – 3
1982–83	First round	Czechoslovakia	Dukla Prague	2 – 0	1 – 2	3 – 2
1982–83	Second round	England	Aston Villa	0 – 2	2 – 4	2 – 6
1983–84	First round	Finland	Kuusysi	3 – 0	1 – 0	4 – 0
1983–84	Second round	West Germany	Hamburg	3 – 0	2 – 3	5 – 3
1983–84	Quarter finals	Soviet Union	Dinamo Minsk	1 – 0	1 – 1	2 – 1
1983–84	Semifinals	England	Liverpool	1 – 2	0 – 1	1 – 3
1984–85	First round	Cyprus	Omonia	4 – 1	1 – 2	5 – 3
1984–85	Second round	France	Bordeaux	1 – 1	0 – 1	1 – 2
1990–91	First round	Republic of Ireland	St Patrick's Athletic	4 – 0	1 – 1	5 – 1
1990–91	Second round	Portugal	Porto	0 – 0	0 – 4	0 – 4
1992–93	First round	Finland	Kuusysi Lahti	(aet) 2 – 0	0 – 1	2 – 1
1992–93	Second round	France	Marseille	0 – 0	0 – 2	0 – 2
2000–01	Second qualifying round	Poland	Polonia Warsaw	3 – 4	1 – 3	4 – 7
2002–03	Second qualifying round	Belgium	Club Brugge	0 – 1	1 – 3	1 – 4
2004–05	Second qualifying round	Slovakia	Žilina	1 – 0	1 – 0	2 – 0
2004–05	Third qualifying round	England	Manchester United	1 – 2	0 – 3	1 – 5
2007–08	Third qualifying round	Italy	Lazio	1 – 3	1 – 1	2 – 4

=== UEFA Cup Winners' Cup / European Cup Winners' Cup ===
Season	Round	Country	Club	Home	Away	Aggregate
1968–69	First round	Hungary	Vasas ETO Győr	w/o		
1968–69	Second round	England	West Bromwich Albion F.C.	1 – 1	0 – 4	1 – 5
1986–87	First round	Albania	17 Nëntori Tirana	1 – 2	0 – 1	1 – 3
1987–88	First round	Belgium	KV Mechelen	0 – 2	0 – 1	0 – 3
1988–89	First round	Finland	Kuusysi Lahti	3 – 0	3 – 0	6 – 0
1988–89	Second round	Scotland	Dundee United	1 – 1	1 – 0	2 – 1
1988–89	Quarter-finals	Italy	Sampdoria	1 – 1	0 – 0	1 – 1 (a)
1989–90	First round	Albania	Dinamo Tirana	2 – 0	0 – 1	2 – 1
1989–90	Second round	Greece	Panathinaikos	6 – 1	2 – 0	8 – 1
1989–90	Quarter-finals	(Socialist Federal Republic of Yugoslavia) SFRY	Partizan	2 – 1	2 – 0	4 – 1
1989–90	Semi-finals	Belgium	Anderlecht	0 – 1	0 – 1	0 – 2

=== UEFA Europa League / UEFA Cup ===
Including away match with Athletic Bilbao.

Season	Round	Country	Club	Home	Away	Aggregate
1974–75	First round	Turkey	Boluspor	3 – 0	1 – 0	4 – 0
1974–75	Second round	West Germany	1. FC Köln	1 – 1	2 – 3	3 – 4
1976–77	First round	Italy	Milan	0 – 0	1 – 2	1 – 2
1979–80	First round	Cyprus	Alki Larnaca FC	3 – 0	9 – 0	12 – 0
1979–80	Second round	West Germany	Eintracht Frankfurt	2 – 0	0 – 3 (aet)	2 – 3
1981–82	First round	Bulgaria	PFC Levski Sofia	3 – 0	1 – 2	4 – 2
1981–82	Second round	Italy	Internazionale	(aet) 3 – 2	1 – 1	4 – 3
1981–82	Third round	Sweden	IFK Göteborg	0 – 1	1 – 3	1 – 4
1985–86	First round	(Socialist Federal Republic of Yugoslavia) SFRY	FK Vardar	2 – 1	0 – 1	2 – 2 (a)
1991–92	First round	Portugal	Sporting CP	(aet) 2 – 0	0 – 1	2 – 1
1991–92	Second round	Italy	Genoa	2 – 2	1 – 3	3 – 5
1993–94	First round	Italy	Cagliari	3 – 2	0 – 2	3 – 4
1994–95	First round	Turkey	Trabzonspor	3 – 3	1 – 2	4 – 5
1995–96	Preliminary round	Bulgaria	Levski Sofia	0 – 1	1 – 1 (aet)	1 – 2
1997–98	First qualifying round	Iceland	KR Reykjavík	1 – 2	0 – 2	1 – 4
1999–2000	Qualifying round	Luxembourg	FC Mondercange	7 – 0	6 – 2	13 – 2
1999–2000	First round	Portugal	S.L. Benfica	0 – 2	1 – 0	1 – 2
2001–02	Qualifying round	Albania	Dinamo Tirana	1 – 0	3 – 1	4 – 1
2001–02	First round	Switzerland	Grasshopper	1 – 3	1 – 3	2 – 6
2003–04	Qualifying round	Latvia	Liepājas Metalurgs	5 – 2	1 – 1	6 – 3
2003–04	First round	Ukraine	Shakhtar Donetsk	2 – 0	3 – 2	5 – 2
2003–04	Second round	Russia	Spartak Moscow	3 – 1	0 – 4	3 – 5
2004–05	First round	Serbia and Montenegro	Partizan	0 – 0	1 – 3	1 – 3
2005–06	Second qualifying round	Cyprus	Omonia	3 – 1	1 – 2	4 – 3
2005–06	First round	England	Everton	5 – 1	0 – 1	5 – 2
2005–06	Group stage (F)	Netherlands	Heerenveen	0 – 0		5th place
2005–06	Group stage (F)	Bulgaria	Levski Sofia		0 – 1	5th place
2005–06	Group stage (F)	Russia	CSKA Moscow	1 – 0		5th place
2005–06	Group stage (F)	France	Marseille		1 – 2	5th place
2006–07	First qualifying round	Malta	Hibernians	5 – 1	4 – 0	9 – 1
2006–07	Second qualifying round	Israel	Beitar Jerusalem	1 – 0	1 – 1	2 – 1
2006–07	First round	Greece	Skoda Xanthi	4 – 1	4 – 3	8 – 4
2006–07	Group stage (B)	Turkey	Beşiktaş	2 – 1		2nd place
2006–07	Group stage (B)	Belgium	Club Brugge		1 – 1	2nd place
2006–07	Group stage (B)	Germany	Bayer Leverkusen	2 – 1		2nd place
2006–07	Group stage (B)	England	Tottenham Hotspur		1 – 3	2nd place
2006–07	Round of 32	Portugal	Benfica	1 – 2	0 – 1	1 – 3
2007–08	First round	Sweden	Elfsborg	1 – 2	1 – 0	2 – 2 (a)
2008–09	First round	Netherlands	NEC	0 – 0	0 – 1	0 – 1
2009–10	Play-off round	Czech Republic	Slovan Liberec	0 – 3	(aet) 3 – 0	3 – 3 (9 – 8 p)
2009–10	Group stage (F)	Austria	Sturm Graz	2 – 1	1 – 0	3rd place
2009–10	Group stage (F)	Greece	Panathinaikos	0 – 1	0 – 3	3rd place
2009–10	Group stage (F)	Turkey	Galatasaray	0 – 3	1 – 4	3rd place
2010–11	Second qualifying round	Moldova	Olimpia	5 – 1	2 – 0	7 – 1
2010–11	Third qualifying round	Croatia	Hajduk Split	3 – 1	0 – 3	3 – 4
2011–12	Third qualifying round	Croatia	Varaždin	2 – 2	2 – 1	4 – 3
2011–12	Play-off round	Ukraine	Vorskla Poltava	2 – 3	1 – 2	3 – 5
2012–13	Play-off round	Ukraine	Metalist Kharkiv	0 – 2	1 – 2	1 – 4
2017–18	Third qualifying round	Spain	Athletic Bilbao	1 – 1	0 – 3	1 – 4

=== Inter-Cities Fairs Cup ===
Season	Round	Country	Club	Home	Away	Aggregate
1970–71	First round	Greece	PAOK	5 – 0	0 – 1	5 – 1
1970–71	Second round	England	Liverpool	1 – 1	0 – 3	1 – 4

=== UEFA Intertoto Cup ===
Season	Round	Country	Club	Home	Away	Aggregate
1996	Group stage (12)	Serbia and Montenegro	Zemun	—N/a	1–2	4th place
1996	Group stage (12)	Finland	Jaro	0–2	—N/a	4th place
1996	Group stage (12)	France	Guingamp	—N/a	1–2	4th place
1996	Group stage (12)	(Georgia (country)) Georgia	Kolkheti Poti	2–0	—N/a	4th place
