= Ryan Klapp =

Luxembourgish footballer (born 1996)

Personal information
- Date of birth: 10 January 1993 (age 33)
- Place of birth: Luxembourg
- Height: 1.80 m (5 ft 11 in)
- Position: Right winger

Team information
- Current team: Grevenmacher

Youth career
- –2012: Eintracht Trier

Senior career*
| Years | Team | Apps | (Gls) |
| 2012–2013 | Racing Union Luxembourg | 25 | (6) |
| 2013–2019 | Fola Esch | 115 | (26) |
| 2019–2020 | Dudelange | 16 | (2) |
| 2021–2023 | Progrès Niederkorn | 32 | (5) |
| 2023–2025 | Mondercange | 54 | (4) |
| 2025– | Grevenmacher | 0 | (0) |
- * Club domestic league appearances and goals as of 4 February 2026

Ryan Klapp (born 10 January 1993) is a Luxembourgish professional footballer who plays as a winger for Grevenmacher.

== Early life ==
Klapp started his career with Luxembourgish side Racing FC Union Luxembourg, where he was described as "an eminent member of a golden generation".

== Education ==
Klapp has studied law.

== Career ==
In 2013, Klapp signed for Luxembourgish side CS Fola Esch. He was regarded as one of the club's most important players. In 2019, he signed for Luxembourgish side F91 Dudelange, helping the club win the league. In 2021, he signed for Luxembourgish side FC Progrès Niederkorn.

== Personal life ==
Klapp has lived in Bettembourg, Luxembourg.
