= Tom Schnell =

Luxembourgish footballer

Personal information
- Date of birth: 8 October 1985 (age 41)
- Place of birth: Luxembourg
- Position: Centre-back

Team information
- Current team: Fola Esch (fitness coach)

Youth career
- Union Luxembourg

Senior career*
Years	Team	Apps	(Gls)
2002–2004	Union Luxembourg	33	(4)
2004–2005	Eintracht Trier 05 II	1	(0)
2005–2011	Racing FC	100	(14)
2011–2014	Fola Esch	50	(7)
2014–2020	F91 Dudelange	115	(3)
2020–2022	Swift Hesperange	41	(5)
2022–2023	UNA Strassen	24	(0)

International career
2004–2016	Luxembourg	48	(0)
- * Club domestic league appearances and goals

Tom Schnell (born 8 October 1985) is a Luxembourgish retired international footballer who played as a centre-back.

== Playing career ==
He was a Luxembourg national football team player.

== Coaching career ==
In 2023 he became a fitness coach at Fola Esch.
