= Dwayn Holter =

Luxembourgish footballer (born 1995)

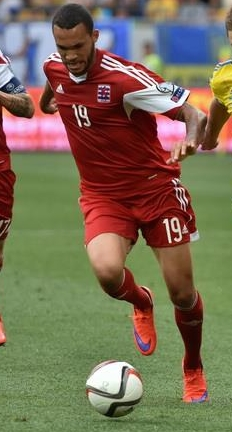
- Holter in 2015

Personal information
- Date of birth: 15 June 1995 (age 31)
- Place of birth: Luxembourg
- Height: 1.83 m (6 ft 0 in)
- Position: Midfielder

Team information
- Current team: Mondorf
- Number: 27

Youth career
- 2000–2012: Racing FC
- 2012–2014: Greuther Fürth

Senior career*
Years	Team	Apps	(Gls)
2011	Racing FC	1	(0)
2014–2015	Greuther Fürth II	16	(2)
2014–2015	Greuther Fürth	0	(0)
2015	→ VfR Aalen (loan)	0	(0)
2016	→ Fola Esch (loan)	10	(0)
2016–2018	FC Differdange 03	41	(3)
2018–2019	Virton	3	(0)
2019–2022	Racing FC	63	(4)
2023–	Mondorf	84	(2)

International career^{‡}
2010–2012	Luxembourg U17	7	(1)
2012–2013	Luxembourg U19	5	(0)
2011–2013	Luxembourg U21	3	(0)
2014–2017	Luxembourg	15	(0)
- * Club domestic league appearances and goals as of 5 June 2026 ‡ National team caps and goals as of 9 November 2017

Dwayn Holter (born 15 June 1995) is a Luxembourgish professional footballer who plays as a midfielder for Mondorf.

== Club career ==
Holter has played club football for Fola Esch, Racing FC and Greuther Fürth II.

In July 2014 he signed his first professional contract with Greuther Fürth for four years until 2018. In July 2015, he moved to 3. Liga side VfR Aalen on a season-long loan. He joined Fola Esch in January 2016. After playing for Differdange and Belgian club Virton, he returned to Racing FC in 2019.

== International career ==
Holter was born in Luxembourg and is of Cape Verdean descent. He made his international debut for Luxembourg in 2014.
