= João Magno =

Brazilian footballer

Personal information
- Full name: João Victo Magno de Souza Machado
- Date of birth: 15 February 1997 (age 29)
- Place of birth: Nanuque, Brazil
- Height: 1.95 m (6 ft 5 in)
- Position: Forward

Team information
- Current team: BG Pathum United
- Number: 45

Youth career
- 2015–2016: Artsul
- 2016: → Boavista (loan)
- 2016: → Palmeiras (loan)

Senior career*
Years	Team	Apps	(Gls)
2016	Artsul	0	(0)
2016	→ Boavista (loan)	2	(0)
2017	→ Serranense (loan)	2	(1)
2017–2022	Grêmio Anápolis	10	(1)
2017	→ Jataiense (loan)	9	(1)
2018	→ Braga B (loan)	4	(0)
2019	→ Real Massamá (loan)	8	(0)
2019–2020	→ Anápolis (loan)	7	(1)
2020–2021	→ Real Massamá (loan)	18	(5)
2021–2022	→ Canelas (loan)	25	(9)
2022	Paços de Ferreira	0	(0)
2022–2023	Dudelange	28	(17)
2023	Goiás	19	(3)
2024	Gwangju	9	(0)
2026	Betim Futebol	0	(0)
2026–	BG Pathum United	0	(0)
- * Club domestic league appearances and goals as of 00:14, 16 December 2024 (UTC)

João Victo Magno de Souza Machado (born 15 February 1997), known as João Magno, is a Brazilian professional footballer who plays as a forward for Thai League 1 club BG Pathum United.

== Club career ==
Born in Nanuque, Minas Gerais, João Magno played for the youth sides of Artsul, being later loaned to Boavista (where he also played two matches with the first team in the Série D) and Palmeiras. In 2017, after a loan deal with Serranense, he signed a permanent deal with Grêmio Anápolis.

João Magno served a loan deal at Jataiense before playing for Grêmio Anápolis in the 2018 Campeonato Goiano, and was announced at Portuguese side S.C. Braga B on 3 July 2018. The following 4 January, after featuring rarely, he moved to Real Massamá also in a temporary deal.

Back to Brazil in June 2019, João Magno joined Anápolis on loan for the year's Campeonato Goiano Segunda Divisão. He returned to his parent club on 17 November, but rejoined Anápolis on 9 December, again on loan.

In July 2020, still owned by Grêmio Anápolis, João Magno returned to Portugal and Real, after agreeing to a new one-year loan deal. He moved to Canelas 2010 in the same country roughly one year later, and scored nine goals for the side during the 2021–22 Liga 3.

On 28 June 2022, João Magno signed a two-year contract with Primeira Liga side Paços de Ferreira, but rescinded his link with the club exactly one month later. On 3 August, he signed for F91 Dudelange in the Luxembourg National Division, and scored a career-best 17 goals during the season.

On 6 July 2023, João Magno was announced at Goiás in the Campeonato Brasileiro Série A. He made his debut for the club three days later, coming on as half-time substitute for Zé Ricardo and scoring his team's third in a 4–3 away loss against Santos.

== Career statistics ==
As of 15 December 2024

Club	Season	League			State League		Cup		Continental		Other		Total	
Club	Season	Division	Apps	Goals	Apps	Goals	Apps	Goals	Apps	Goals	Apps	Goals	Apps	Goals
Boavista	2016	Série D	2	0	—		—		—		—		2	0
Serranense	2017	Mineiro Módulo II	—		2	1	—		—		—		2	1
Grêmio Anápolis	2017	Goiano 2ª Divisão	—		2	0	—		—		—		2	0
Grêmio Anápolis	2018	Goiano	—		8	1	—		—		—		8	1
Grêmio Anápolis	Total		—		10	1	—		—		—		10	1
Jataiense (loan)	2017	Goiano 3ª Divisão	—		9	1	—		—		—		9	1
Braga B (loan)	2018–19	LigaPro	4	0	—		—		—		—		4	0
Real Massamá (loan)	2018–19	Campeonato de Portugal	8	0	—		—		—		—		8	0
Anápolis (loan)	2019	Goiano 2ª Divisão	—		3	0	—		—		—		3	0
Anápolis (loan)	2020	Goiano	—		4	1	—		—		—		4	1
Anápolis (loan)	Total		—		7	1	—		—		—		7	1
Real Massamá (loan)	2020–21	Campeonato de Portugal	18	5	—		1	1	—		—		19	6
Canelas (loan)	2021–22	Liga 3	25	9	—		2	2	—		—		27	11
Dudelange	2022–23	Luxembourg National Division	28	17	—		—		4 (Note: Two appearances in UEFA Europa League, two appearances in UEFA Europa Conference League)	0	—		32	17
Goiás	2023	Série A	19	3	—		—		—		—		19	3
Gwangju	2024	K League 1	9	0	—		2	1	0	0	—		11	1
Career total			113	34	28	4	5	4	4	0	0	0	150	42
