= Aleksandar Biedermann =

German footballer (born 1980)

Personal information
- Date of birth: 3 January 1995 (age 31)
- Place of birth: Mannheim, Germany
- Height: 1.85 m (6 ft 1 in)
- Position: Forward

Team information
- Current team: FC Blo-Wäiss Medernach

Senior career*
Years	Team	Apps	(Gls)
2014–2016	SV Sandhausen II	50	(12)
2016–2017	SC Hauenstein	31	(10)
2017–2018	Eintracht Trier	27	(12)
2018–2020	Victoria Rosport	42	(20)
2020	US Mondorf-les-Bains	7	(0)
2021	TuS Mechtersheim	19	(16)
2022	Wormatia Worms	16	(4)
2022–2023	Arminia Ludwigshafen	8	(3)
2023–	FC Blo-Wäiss Medernach		
- * Club domestic league appearances and goals

Aleksandar Biedermann (born 3 January 1995) is a German footballer who plays as a forward for FC Blo-Wäiss Medernach.

== Early life ==
Biedermann was nicknamed "King Kong" from a young age.

== Career ==
In 2018, Biedermann signed for Luxembourgish side Victoria Rosport, where he made forty-eight league appearances and scored twenty goals. In 2020, he signed for Luxembourgish club US Mondorf-les-Bains. In 2021, he signed for German side TuS Mechtersheim, where he was regarded as one of the club's most important players.

== Style of play ==
Biedermann mainly operates as a striker and is known for his strength.

== Personal life ==
Biedermann is of Yugoslav descent through his mother.
