= Sébastien Grandjean =

Belgian football manager (born 1970)

Personal information
- Date of birth: 16 June 1970 (age 56)
- Place of birth: Belgium

Team information
- Current team: SL16 FC (manager)

Managerial career
- Years: Team
- 2002–2006: FC Arlon
- 2006–2009: RE Virton
- 2011–2012: Jeunesse Esch
- 2012–2013: UR La Louvière Centre
- 2014–2015: F91 Dudelange
- 2019: Jeunesse Esch
- 2020–2022: CS Fola Esch
- 2023–2024: Francs Borains
- 2024–2025: SL16 FC
- 2025–: Racing Union

Sébastien Grandjean (born 16 June 1970) is a Belgian football manager who is the manager of SL16 FC, the reserve team of Standard Liège that plays in the Belgian Division 1.

== Career ==
Grandjean is a licensed physiotherapist and started his career with Belgian side FC Arlon in 2002. In 2006, he was appointed manager of Belgian side RE Virton. Five years later, he was appointed manager of Luxembourgish side Jeunesse Esch, helping the club achieve second place in the league. Subsequently, he was appointed manager of Belgian side UR La Louvière Centre in 2012.

Two years later, he was appointed manager of Luxembourgish side F91 Dudelange. Following his stint there, he was appointed manager of Luxembourgish side CS Fola Esch in 2020, helping the club win the league title. Three years later, he was appointed manager of Belgian side Francs Borains before being appointed manager of Belgian side SL16 FC in 2024.

In November 2025, Grandjean returned to Luxembourg to manage Racing Union.

== Personal life ==
Grandjean was born on 16 June 1970 in Belgium and is the son of Félix Grandjean. A native of Gedinne, Belgium, he has two daughters.
