= Florik Shala =

Luxembourgish footballer (born 1995)

Personal information
- Date of birth: 19 July 1997 (age 29)
- Height: 1.92 m (6 ft 4 in)
- Position: Striker

Youth career
- FC Metz

Senior career*
Years	Team	Apps	(Gls)
2016–2019	Racing FC Union Luxembourg	68	(21)
2019–2021	FC Progrès Niederkorn	35	(10)
2021–2023	FC Swift Hesperange	8	(3)
2023–2024	FC UNA Strassen	20	(7)
2024–2025	Union Titus Pétange	24	(4)
- * Club domestic league appearances and goals as of 6 June 2026

Florik Shala (born 19 July 1997) is a Luxembourgish footballer who last played as a striker for Union Titus Pétange.

== Early life ==
Shala holds a Kosovo passport and a Luxembourg passport.

== Career ==
Shala started his career with Luxembourgish side Racing FC Union Luxembourg. He helped the club win the 2018 Luxembourg Cup.

== Style of play ==
Shala initially played as a midfielder earlier in his career before switching to a winger later in his career.

== Personal life ==
Shala has received comparisons to Sweden international Zlatan Ibrahimovic due to his physical appearance.
