= Tom Laterza =

Luxembourgish footballer

Personal information
- Date of birth: 9 May 1992 (age 34)
- Place of birth: Mondercange, Luxembourg
- Height: 1.79 m (5 ft 10 in)
- Position: Right-back

Team information
- Current team: Mondercange
- Number: 23

Senior career*
Years	Team	Apps	(Gls)
2009–2012	Sedan B	9	(0)
2012–2019	Fola Esch	134	(25)
2019–2021	Progres Niederkorn	26	(0)
2021–2023	Mondercange	22	(0)
2023–2025	Schifflange 95	36	(1)
2025–	Mondercange	14	(0)

International career
2009–2016	Luxembourg	34	(0)
- * Club domestic league appearances and goals as of 6 June 2026

Tom Laterza (born 9 May 1992) is a Luxembourgish international footballer who plays in Luxembourg for Mondercange, as a right-back.

== Career ==
Laterza played club football in France for Sedan B from 2009 to 2012.

He made his international debut for Luxembourg in 2009, and has appeared in UEFA European Football Championship and FIFA World Cup qualifying matches.

In 2012, he moved to the Luxembourg National Division club CS Fola Esch, and then in 2019 moved to Progres Niedercorn.
