= Antonio Luisi =

Luxembourgish footballer (born 1994)

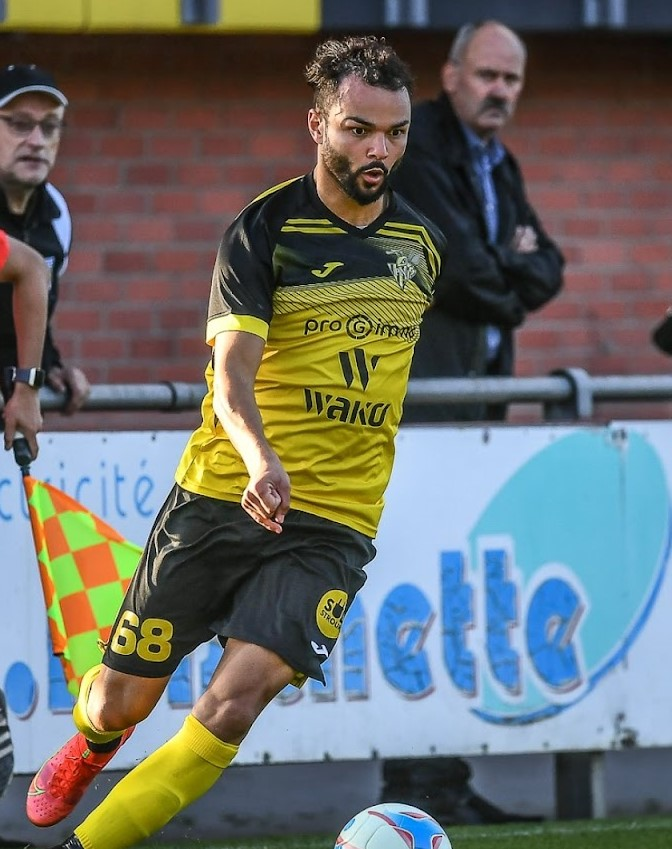

Personal information
- Date of birth: 7 October 1994 (age 32)
- Place of birth: Luxembourg City, Luxembourg
- Height: 1.84 m (6 ft 0 in)
- Position: Winger

Team information
- Current team: Mondercange
- Number: 28

Senior career*
Years	Team	Apps	(Gls)
2011–2013	Racing Luxembourg	36	(10)
2013–2017	FC Differdange 03	80	(25)
2017–2019	F91 Dudelange	7	(0)
2018–2019	→ Jeunesse Esch (loan)	11	(9)
2019–2023	Progrès Niederkorn	59	(23)
2023–2024	Jeunesse Esch	13	(5)
2024–2025	F91 Dudelange	10	(0)
2025–	Mondercange	17	(8)

International career^{‡}
2013–2014	Luxembourg	6	(0)
- * Club domestic league appearances and goals as of 6 June 2026 ‡ National team caps and goals as of 29 May 2014

Antonio Luisi (born 7 October 1994) is a Luxembourgish international footballer who plays as a winger for Mondercange.

== Career ==
Luisi has played club football for Racing Luxembourg and FC Differdange 03.

He made his senior international debut for Luxembourg in 2013.
