= Benjamin Runser =

Luxembourgish footballer (born 1991)

Personal information
- Date of birth: 4 September 1991 (age 35)
- Place of birth: France
- Position: Striker

Team information
- Current team: ES Marange

Senior career*
Years	Team	Apps	(Gls)
2014–2015	CSO Amnéville	12	(1)
2015–2016	FC Avenir Beggen		
2016–2017	FC RM Hamm Benfica	17	(3)
2017–2022	FC UNA Strassen	96	(35)
2022	CS Fola Esch	12	(5)
2023–	ES Marange		
- * Club domestic league appearances and goals

Benjamin Runser (born 4 September 1991) is a Luxembourgish footballer who plays as a striker for ES Marange.

School Education

Benjamin Runser currently teaches at the Charles De Gaulle College (in France in the Grand-Est region of Moselle in Fameck) as a sports teacher.

== Early life ==
As a young player, Runser signed for French side UL Rombas, where he was regarded as one of the club's most important players.

== Education ==
Runser studied physical education teaching in Corsica, France.

== Career ==
In 2015, Runser signed for Luxembourgish side FC Avenir Beggen, where he scored five goals by the matchday twelve. In 2016, he signed for Luxembourgish side FC RM Hamm Benfica. In 2017, he signed for Luxembourgish side FC UNA Strassen, where he was regarded as one of the club's most important players. In 2022, he signed for Luxembourgish side CS Fola Esch, where he suffered an injury.

== Style of play ==
Runser mainly operates as a striker and has operated as a winger while playing for FC UNA Strassen and is known for his strength.

== Personal life ==
Runser has regarded Spain international Raúl as his football idol.
