= Martin Forkel =

German footballer (born 1979)

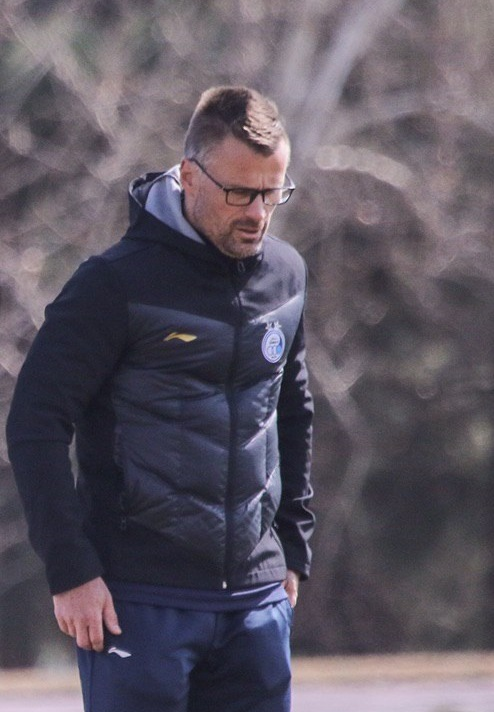
- Forkel in 2019

Personal information
- Date of birth: 22 July 1979 (age 47)
- Place of birth: Coburg, West Germany
- Height: 1.71 m (5 ft 7 in)
- Position: Right-back

Team information
- Current team: Mondorf-les-Bains (Manager)

Youth career
- 1986–1994: Viktoria DJK Coburg
- 1994–1995: VfB Coburg
- 1995–1998: Greuther Fürth

Senior career*
Years	Team	Apps	(Gls)
1998–1999	Greuther Fürth	1	(0)
1999–2000	Borussia Fulda	33	(4)
2000–2006	Wacker Burghausen	161	(3)
2006–2010	TuS Koblenz	69	(1)
2010–2012	1. FC Saarbrücken	67	(2)
2012–2013	Borussia Neunkirchen	33	(0)
2013	1. FC Saarbrücken II	11	(0)
2013–2014	1. FC Saarbrücken	23	(0)
2014–2015	1. FC Saarbrücken II	12	(1)
Total		410	(11)

International career
1999	Germany U-21	6	(0)

Managerial career
- 2014–2015: 1. FC Saarbrücken (youth)
- 2014–2015: 1. FC Saarbrücken II (playing manager)
- 2015–2016: 1. FC Saarbrücken U19
- 2015: 1. FC Saarbrücken (caretaker)
- 2016–2017: Vietnam (caretaker)
- 2018–2019: Ho Chi Minh City
- 2019: Esteghlal (assistant)
- Berdenia Berbourg
- 2022–26: Victoria Rosport
- 2026–: Mondorf-les-Bains
- * Club domestic league appearances and goals

Martin Forkel (born 22 July 1979) is a German football manager and former player who played as a right-back., currently manager of Luxembourg National Division team Mondorf-les-Bains.

== Career ==
=== Youth career ===
Forkel was born in Coburg. He played as a youth for two clubs in his hometown, Viktoria DJK Coburg and VfB Coburg, before joining TSV Vestenbergsgreuth. TSV merged with SpVgg Fürth in 1996, forming Greuther Fürth, with whom Forkel would make his breakthrough in the professional game.

=== Southern Germany ===
Forkel made one appearance for Greuther Fürth, as a substitute for Arie van Lent in a 3–1 win over FSV Mainz in the 2. Bundesliga in December 1998. He was released by the club at the end of the 1998–99 season, signing for Borussia Fulda of the Regionalliga Süd. Fulda were relegated in Forkel's only season with the club, finishing 17th, but he was to stay at the third tier, signing for Wacker Burghausen in July 2000.

In Forkel's first season with Burghausen, the club battled against relegation, but were promoted as champions in 2001–02, with Forkel and ever-present. He would go on to play for the club for four seasons in the 2. Bundesliga, achieving a mid-table finish each time, before leaving to join TuS Koblenz in July 2006.

=== Western Germany ===
Forkel made his debut for TuS Koblenz on the opening day of the 2006–07 season, as a substitute for Rüdiger Ziehl in a 2–1 defeat against MSV Duisburg. As at Burghausen, he would play for four seasons in the 2. Bundesliga, although his appearances were more restricted, and his time at Koblenz ended with the club being relegated to the 3. Liga in 2010.

Forkel then joined another 3. Liga club, 1. FC Saarbrücken, where he would spend the next two seasons as a regular in the first team. He was released by the club in 2012, and spent a year with Borussia Neunkirchen of the Oberliga Rheinland-Pfalz/Saar. In July 2013 he returned to Saarbrücken, originally to play for their reserve team, but after coach Jürgen Luginger was replaced with Milan Šašić he was brought back into the first-team fold. He made his second debut for the club in September 2013 as a substitute for Philipp Hoffmann in a 1–0 defeat to Darmstadt 98, and remained a first-team regular until the end of the season, which saw Saarbrücken relegated. Forkel then left the club for a second time.

=== International career ===
Forkel was in the Germany squad for the 1999 FIFA World Youth Championship, and made six appearances for the under-21 team that same year.

== Managerial career ==
Forkel moved to coach in Luxembourg, starting with Berdenia Berbourg before moving to Victoria Rosport where he spent four years. He then moved to Mondorf-les-Bains in May 2026.
