= Dominik Stolz =

German footballer

Personal information
- Full name: Dominik Stolz
- Date of birth: 4 May 1990 (age 36)
- Place of birth: Neuendettelsau, Germany
- Height: 1.74 m (5 ft 9 in)
- Position: Midfielder

Team information
- Current team: Racing Union
- Number: 7

Youth career
- 2008–2010: SpVgg Ansbach

Senior career*
| Years | Team | Apps | (Gls) |
| 2010–2011 | Greuther Fürth II | 13 | (1) |
| 2011–2014 | SV Seligenporten | 103 | (35) |
| 2014–2015 | SpVgg Bayreuth | 34 | (23) |
| 2015–2016 | SV Sandhausen | 7 | (1) |
| 2015 | SV Sandhausen II | 1 | (1) |
| 2016–2020 | F91 Dudelange | 75 | (28) |
| 2020–2025 | Swift Hesperange | 144 | (104) |
| 2025- | Racing FC | 27 | (8) |
- * Club domestic league appearances and goals as of 13 June 2026

Dominik Stolz (born 4 May 1990) is a German professional footballer who plays as a midfielder for Racing Union.
