= Hostert, Niederanven =

Coordinates: 49.657°N 6.233°E

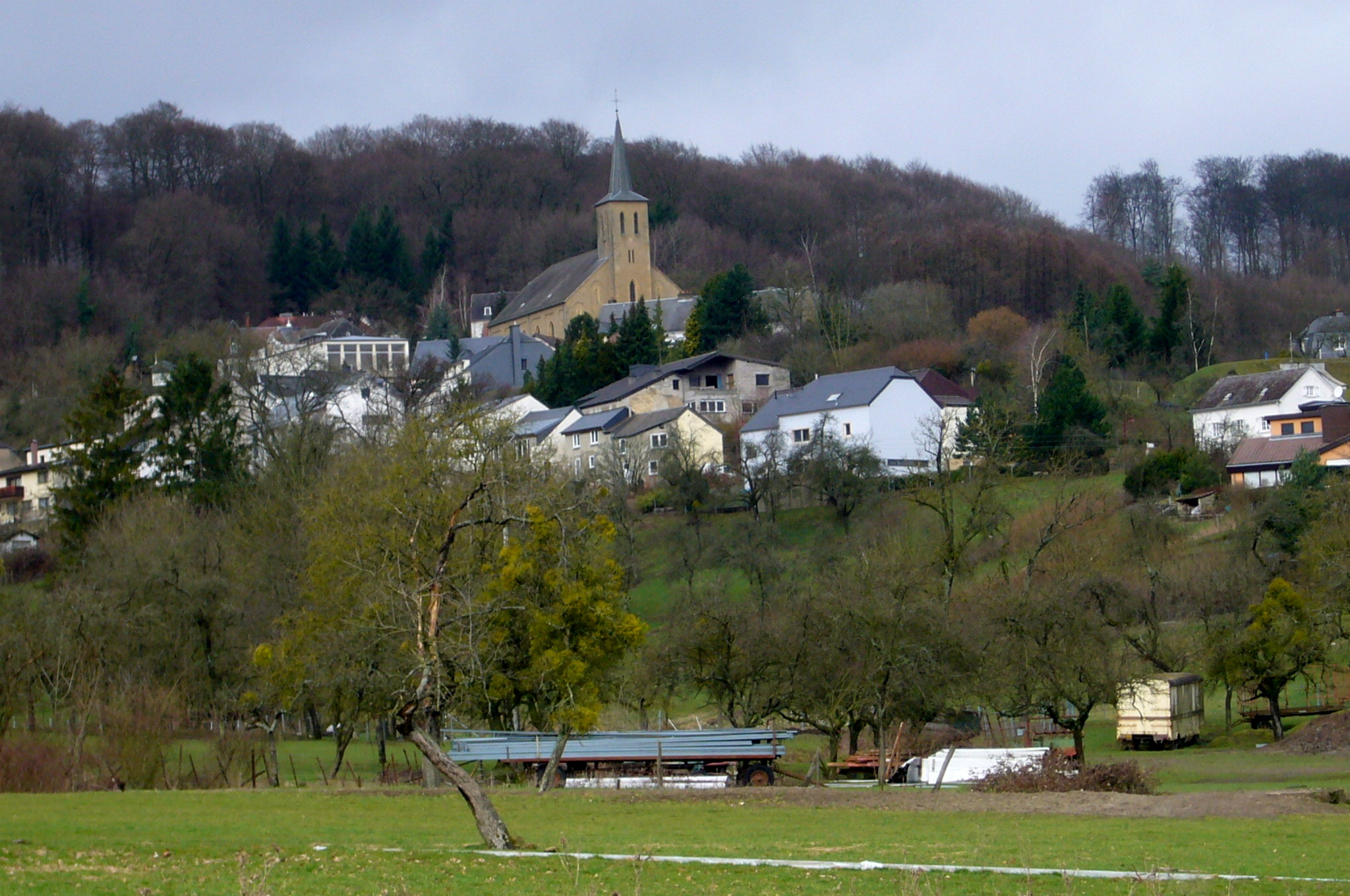

Hostert (Luxembourgish: Hueschtert) is a small town in the commune of Niederanven, in central Luxembourg. As of September 2026, the town has a population of 581.
