= Artur Abreu =

Luxembourgish footballer

Personal information
- Full name: Artur Abreu Pereira
- Date of birth: 11 August 1994 (age 32)
- Place of birth: Niederkorn, Luxembourg
- Height: 1.82 m (6 ft 0 in)
- Position: Midfielder

Team information
- Current team: Differdange 03
- Number: 7

Youth career
- –2013: CS Pétange

Senior career*
Years	Team	Apps	(Gls)
2013	CS Pétange	1	(0)
2013–2015	Differdange 03	14	(1)
2014	→ Luna Oberkorn (loan)		
2015–2023	Union Titus Pétange	144	(65)
2017–2018	→ Vitória S.C. B (loan)	25	(1)
2024–	Differdange 03	47	(15)
- * Club domestic league appearances and goals as of 6 June 2026

Artur Abreu Pereira (born 11 August 1994) is a Luxembourgish professional footballer who currently plays for Differdange 03.

== Career ==
=== Union Titus Pétange ===
Recording 11 goals with Union Titus Pétange in the 2015-16 Luxembourg second division, Abreu helped the club achieve promotion to the 2016-17 Luxembourg National Division. However, he had to spend ten weeks recovering from an injury and had not fully rehabilitated by the start of the season.

In 2017, the Luxembourgish midfielder aimed to represent Luxembourg in their 2018 World Cup qualifying fixture against France but was never selected.

=== Vitória S.C. ===
Trialling for Vitória S.C. of the Portuguese Primeira Liga in 2017, Abreu officially became a player for the club in June that year and was placed in their reserve team where he opened his scoring account with a goal in a 1-0 league triumph over SL Benfica B.
