= Racing FC Union Luxembourg =

Association football club in Luxembourg

Racing Union Luxembourg
- Full name: Racing Football Club Union; Lëtzebuerg
- Founded: 12 May 2005; 21 years ago
- Ground: Stade Achille Hammerel, Luxembourg City
- Capacity: 5,814
- President: Karine Reuter
- Manager: Sébastien Grandjean
- League: National Division
- 2025–26: National Division, 7th of 16
- Website: www.racing-union.lu
| Home colours | Away colours |

Racing Fussball Club Union Luxembourg (Luxembourgish: Racing Fussball Club Union Lëtzebuerg), usually abbreviated to Racing-Union, is a football club based in Luxembourg City, in southern Luxembourg. They current compete in the National Division, the top tier of Luxembourgish football.

The etymology of the name originates from Racing Club Luxembourg and Union Sportive Luxembourg, two successful historic clubs of the many that merged to create it. Other clubs that were merged throughout history to form the current club include CA Spora Luxembourg, Sporting Club Luxembourg, CS Hollerich, CS Alliance 01, FC Aris Bonnevoie, US Hollerich Bonnevoie and Jeunesse Sportive Verlorenkost.

== History ==
=== Glorious Early Days ===
Racing Club Luxembourg was founded in 1907 and became the first official Champion of Luxembourg by winning the title in 1909–10. RC Luxembourg also won the first Cup in 1922. Along with Sporting Club Luxembourg and Union Sportive Hollerich, the three clubs of the capital dominated Luxembourgish football in its early days. The supremacy of the capital city's footballers was such that, for the first official match of Luxembourg's national team against France on 29 October 1911, the starting lineup was entirely composed of Racing, Sporting and Union players. The match finished 4–1 in France's favour.

=== First Mergers ===
The domination of the capital city's football clubs drew to a close at the end of the 1920s with the emergence of teams from the south of the country, such as CS Fola Esch and Red Boys Differdange. The decline of sporting success thus led to a phenomenon that was to have a profound impact on the footballing community in the commune, namely the propensity of clubs to engage in mergers.

The first big merger occurred in 1923 with the union of the two first Champions of Luxembourg: Racing & Sporting. The origins of Racing were on the Limpertsberg, where they had their pitch on what is today the location of the "Schueberfouer" before moving to the route d'Esch in 1912. It won the first Luxembourg Cup, beating Jeunesse Esch 2–0 in the final. Sporting, the club of the centre of Luxembourg City, had found a pitch on what is today the Winston Churchill Square in 1910 and had also signed off in glory by bringing home the 1919 Championship. In 1923, the two clubs united under the new name of CA Spora Luxembourg. The name "Spora" came from the first three letters of SPOrting and the first two of RAcing. This club would not only become one of the most successful, but also one of the largest sports clubs in the country with athletics, fencing, tennis and others.

Barely two years later, in 1925, the most successful of the clubs, Union Sportive Hollerich / Bonnevoie, merged with Jeunesse Sportive, from the Verlorenkost area of the city. Union desired this merger in order to be able to play on the much higher quality and better-situated pitch located in Verlorenkost. From this moment on the club became known as Union Sportive Luxembourg, playing their matches in Verlorenkost on what is today the site of Racing FC Union's home ground, Stade Achille Hammerel.

These two mergers would quickly be crowned by success: Union, whose team was full of Luxembourgish internationals, won its sixth title in 1927. Spora for its part had also begun a period of tremendous success, which up to the Second World War would see them winning seven championship titles as well as three cup wins.

=== CA Spora's Golden Age ===
The period from CA Spora's foundation up until the occupation of Luxembourg by the Nazis, as well as after 1945, was gilded by the "Blue-Yellows". On their pitch in the middle of a residential area of Luxembourg City, in permanent contact with its inhabitants and the youth, Spora experienced a near-explosive success. During this time it gained a reputation for organising large events of its home ground. From 1924 onwards, Spora organised a 3 Nations Cup during the Easter weekend. Two foreign teams would be invited, and this authentic competition ended up becoming much more important than a simple round of friendly matches. Over 25 editions the Luxembourgish crowd would be able to witness such illustrious teams as Austria Vienna with its wunderkind Mathias Sindelar, PSV Eindhoven, Slavia Prague, Young Fellows Zurich, Beerschot Antwerp, Lanerossi Vicenza and even the Brazilian AC Bangu. These matches lasted up until the day Spora moved to a new pitch on the Route d'Arlon - Stade Josy Barthel, formerly home to the Luxembourg national football team.

=== Union's Renaissance and the Rise of Aris ===
The 1961 Championship title would be the last for CA Spora for a while. Before completely disappearing from the peak of Luxembourgish football, they did manage to snag two cup wins in 1965 and 1966, under the auspices of their player-coach Vic Nurenberg. The former professional scored a hattrick against Real Madrid for his team OGC Nice in the 1960 Champions League.

Other clubs from the capital city were ready to take the reins of success off of Spora. In total, Luxembourg City would be able to celebrate winning silverware a staggering 15 times during the period 1959–72. The main source of this success was Union Sportive Luxembourg, who had all but disappeared after their victory in the 1927 Championship. They resurfaced and took home two championship titles (1962 & 1971) and five cup wins (1959, 1963, 1964, 1969, 1970) in twelve years. Players such as Johny Léonard, three-time top goal scorer in the national league before joining FC Metz, and Nico Braun became emblematic of this period. Before embarking on his professional career, for example, Nico Braun scored 25 goals in 22 matches of the 1970/71 Championship which his club dominated without losing even one match.

The 60s saw the arrival of another club, Aris Bonnevoie. In 1963/64, Aris and all of Bonnevoie had huge celebrations when in its 5th season of top-flight football it clinched the title. The club from the most populous area of the city edged out its cousins from the Verlorenkost, Union. It was the first trophy of its existence, dating back to 1922, and it was celebrated at the Parc des Sports, nowadays called Stade Camille Polfer which serves as the training grounds for Racing FC Union.

Winning the titles of 1966 and 1972, Aris also managed to win the Cup in 1967, again edging out the Union from Verlorenkost. However, these would prove to be the last successes of this upstart club. It would never again find the same level of success it had in the 60s and early 70s, and after years of sporting decline, it merged with CS Hollerich in 2001. With the decline of the early 70s, it would be a dozen of years before any club from the capital would be able to celebrate a title once more.

=== A Deceptive Turn of the Century ===
The late '80s and the '90s yielded successes for Union, although the team faced struggles in the beginning of the 1980s They lost their most promising talent and top goal scorer in the national leaguer with 26 goals at the age of 20, Robby Langers, and were forced to rely on the most loyal of loyal players for their team. Their fortunes soon changed, and with the wins of the Luxembourg Cup in '86, '89 and '91, they were able to bring a new dynamic into the team. This allowed them to win the Championship three years in a row – 1990, 91 and 92. Union would be the last team from the Capital to win a title in the 20th Century, with its Cup win in 1996. It would be the last title for a Luxembourg City team for over 20 years.

Spora, Aris or Union then fell into financial and sporting difficulties. Having lived for years above its means, with expensive transfers and excessive wages, as well as neglect of youth development, Aris was forced to merge with CS Hollerich in 2001 to create CS Alliance 01. Union and Spora were also experiencing difficulties, with low attendance at their respective grounds and quickly accumulating debt. The merger that had created Alliance 01 had been a political botch-job that had left the new club without any fan base nor resources. In 2005 it was thus decided, upon great pressure from the Mayor and the councillors of the City of Luxembourg, to merge Alliance with Spora and Union. Racing FC Union was thus born out of troubled times, the politics behind the scenes having destroyed a lot of the trust and support the clubs had had amongst the general population.

=== A Bright Future Ahead ===
The merger of 2005 left a large vacuum of power and responsibility. Politicians thought they had found the ideal solution when the President of the French first flight team ESTAC Troyes, Daniel Masoni, became the President of Racing FC Union. However, the team was relegated from the top level in 2014, and Masoni was ousted from leadership.

The situation did improve upon the return of a Luxembourgish president, in the form of former FC Rodange 91 President Karine Reuter, and the fortunes of the club began to change. With a widely instituted reform programme, a deep renewal process was launched. A preliminary climax of this process was reached when Racing won the 2017–18 Luxembourg Cup. Racing had two players sent off with yellow-reds and played over 45 minutes with 9 men. After extra-time, they clinched the win on penalties, with Julien Jahier scoring the winner in his last match for the club.

== Current squad ==
As of 23 September 2026

Note: Flags indicate national team as defined under FIFA eligibility rules; some limited exceptions apply. Players may hold more than one non-FIFA nationality.

| No. | Pos. | Nation | Player |
|---|---|---|---|
| 2 | DF | CPV | Marcelo Cruz |
| 4 | DF | ALG | Joakim Kada |
| 6 | MF | CPV | Bruno Frere |
| 7 | MF | GER | Dominik Stolz |
| 8 | MF | SEN | Moussa Kanté |
| 9 | FW | FRA | Hayssam Zaki |
| 10 | MF | LUX | Farid Ikene |
| 11 | MF | FRA | Khalid Taarimte |
| 12 | DF | BEL | Thibaut Lesquoy |
| 14 | FW | SEN | Mouhamed Diop |
| 17 | MF | ALG | Hadi Bentebbal |
| 19 | FW | FRA | Mahamadou Diawara |
| 20 | DF | SMN | Fabien Fonrose |

| No. | Pos. | Nation | Player |
|---|---|---|---|
| 21 | DF | COD | Carmel Mabanza |
| 22 | GK | LUX | Matteo Amah-Tchoutchoui |
| 26 | MF | MAR | Emir Agovic |
| 27 | FW | CIV | Inza Yere |
| 28 | DF | FRA | Wilfried Fuyasueka |
| 29 | FW | FRA | Ronan Matuvangua |
| 30 | GK | MAD | Sonny Laiton |
| 42 | MF | BEL | Allan Delferrière |
| 44 | MF | LUX | Alfred Krings |
| 77 | MF | BEL | Lohan Dewalque |
| 91 | FW | MLI | Amadou Konaté |
| 99 | GK | LUX | Ermal Azemi |

=== Out on loan ===
Note: Flags indicate national team as defined under FIFA eligibility rules; some limited exceptions apply. Players may hold more than one non-FIFA nationality.

| No. | Pos. | Nation | Player |

=== Coaching staff ===
- (Bosnia and Herzegovina) Fahrudin Kuduzović (director)
- (Belgium) Sébastien Grandjean (head coach)
- (Luxembourg) Antoine Mangionne (assistant coach)
- (France) Jonathan Lerolle (Goalkeeper Coach)

== European competition ==
=== Record by competition ===
| Competition | Played | W | D | L | GF | GA |
|---|---|---|---|---|---|---|
| UEFA Cup / Europa League | 4 | 0 | 1 | 3 | 1 | 12 |
| UEFA Europa Conference League | 4 | 0 | 0 | 4 | 3 | 13 |
| Overall | 8 | 0 | 1 | 7 | 4 | 25 |

=== Matches ===
| Season | Competition | Round | Opponent | Home | Away | Aggregate |
|---|---|---|---|---|---|---|
| 2008–09 | UEFA Cup | 1QR | (Sweden) Kalmar FF | 0–3 | 1–7 | 1–10 |
| 2018–19 | UEFA Europa League | 1QR | (Romania) Viitorul Constanța | 0−2 | 0–0 | 0–2 |
| 2021–22 | UEFA Europa Conference League | 1QR | (Iceland) Breiðablik | 2−3 | 0–2 | 2–5 |
| 2022–23 | UEFA Europa Conference League | 2QR | (Serbia) Čukarički | 1–4 | 0–4 | 1–8 |
| 2025−26 | UEFA Conference League | 1QR | (Georgia (country)) Dila Gori | 1–2 | 0–1 | 1–3 |

== Notable former players ==
- (Luxembourg) Alphonse Weicker
- (Luxembourg) Jemmy Becker
- (Luxembourg) Zénon Bernard
- (Luxembourg) François Lang
- (Luxembourg) Jos Faber
- (Luxembourg) Albert Elter
- (Luxembourg) Emile Kuborn
- (Luxembourg) Jos Michaux
- (Luxembourg) Jean Walin
- (Luxembourg) Henri Schwartz
- (Luxembourg) Ady Hubert
- (Luxembourg) Robert Ries
- (Luxembourg) Will Schutz
- (Luxembourg) Michel Ungeheuer
- (Luxembourg) Victor Kauth
- (Austria) Josef Frühwirth
- (Luxembourg) Leon Letsch
- (Luxembourg) Fernand Brosius
- (Luxembourg) Jempy Fiedler
- (Luxembourg) Victor Nurenberg
- (Luxembourg) Guy Bernardin
- (Luxembourg) Johny Léonard
- (Luxembourg) Paul Hoscheit
- (Luxembourg) Jeannot Reiter
- (Luxembourg) Nico Braun
- (Luxembourg) Laurent Schonckert
- (Luxembourg) Claude Grimberger
- (Luxembourg) John Van Rijswijck
- (Luxembourg) Marc Birsens
- (Luxembourg) Gérard Jeitz
- (Luxembourg) Laurent Deville
- (Luxembourg) Frank Deville
- (Luxembourg) Carlo Weis
- (Luxembourg) Robby Langers
- (Luxembourg) Tom Schnell
- (France) Jonathan Hennetier dit le Goéland
- (Senegal) Pape Ibra M'Boup
- (Luxembourg) Daniel Da Mota

=== Former Academy Players ===
- (Luxembourg) Ryan Klapp
- (Luxembourg) Antonio Luisi
- (Luxembourg) Kiki Martins
- (Luxembourg) Dwayn Holter
- (Luxembourg) Dirk Carlson
- (Luxembourg) Danel Sinani
- (Luxembourg) Florik Shala
- (Luxembourg) Florian Bohnert
- (Luxembourg) Jan Ostrowski
- (Republic of Ireland) Ryan Johansson
- (Luxembourg) Dylan Kuete Nsidjine
- (Iceland) Stefán Ingi Sigurdarson
- (Iceland) Atli Hrafn Andrason
- (Luxembourg) Leandro Barreiro
- (England) Brian Madjo

== Managers ==
- (Luxembourg) Jacques Muller (1 July 2005 – 13 Apr 2007)
- (Portugal) Alvaro Cruz (1 July 2007 – 22 Sept 2008)
- (France) Sebastien Allieri (22 Oct 2008 – 4 Mar 2012)
- (Luxembourg) Claude Origer (5 Mar 2012 – 24 Feb 2014)
- (Belgium) Pascal Lebrun (10 Mar 2014 – 18 Dec 2014)
- (France) Fabien Matagne (4 Jan 2015 – 17 Mar 2016)
- (France) Samy Smaili (1 July 2005 – 13 Apr 2017)
- (Luxembourg) Patrick Grettnich (15 May 2017 – 20 Aug 2019)
- (France) Régis Brouard (21 Aug 2019 – 30 Jan 2021)
- (Luxembourg) Jeff Saibene (21 Jun 2021 – 25 May 2022)
- (Bosnia and Herzegovina) Fahrudin Kuduzović (5 Jun 2022 – 28 April 2023)
- (Luxembourg) Marco Martino (1 July 2023 – present)

== Honours ==
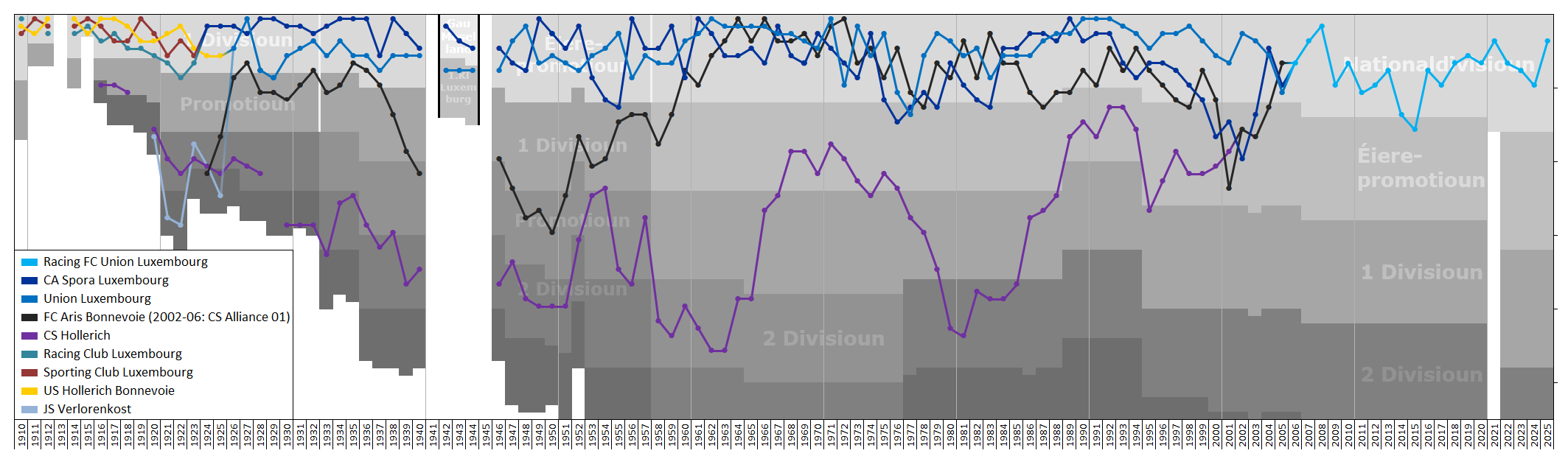
Historical league performance chart of Racing FC Union Luxembourg and its predecessors

=== Racing FC Union ===
- National Division
  - Runners-up (1): 2007–08
- Luxembourg Cup
  - Winners (2): 2017–18, 2021–22
- Division of Honour
  - Runners-up (1): 2014–15

=== As CA Spora Luxembourg ===
- National Division
  - Winners (11): 1924–25, 1927–28, 1928–29, 1933–34, 1934–35, 1935–36, 1937–38, 1948–49, 1955–56, 1960–61, 1988–89
  - Runners-up (10): 1923–24, 1925–26, 1929–30, 1930–31, 1932–33, 1944–45, 1951–52, 1958–59, 1966–67, 1987–88
- Luxembourg Cup
  - Winners (8): 1927–28, 1931–32, 1939–40, 1949–50, 1956–57, 1964–65, 1965–66, 1979–80
  - Runners-up (8): 1924–25, 1928–29, 1929–30, 1930–31, 1933–34, 1944–45, 1962–63, 1986–87

=== As Racing Club Luxembourg ===
- National Division
  - Winners (1): 1909–10
- Luxembourg Cup
  - Winners (1): 1921–22

=== As Sporting Club Luxembourg ===
- National Division
  - Winners (2): 1910–11, 1918–19
  - Runners-up (3): 1911–12, 1913–14, 1915–16

=== As Union Luxembourg ===
- National Division
  - Winners (6): 1926–27, 1961–62, 1970–71, 1989–90, 1990–91, 1991–92
  - Runners-up (9): 1921–22, 1947–48, 1962–63, 1963–64, 1964–65, 1965–66, 1972–73, 1992–93, 1997–98
- Luxembourg Cup
  - Winners (10): 1946–47, 1958–59, 1962–63, 1963–64, 1968–69, 1969–70, 1985–86, 1988–89, 1990–91, 1995–96
  - Runners-up (10): 1922–23, 1925–26, 1932–33, 1936–37, 1960–61, 1961–62, 1966–67, 1977–78, 1982–83, 1996–97

=== As US Hollerich Bonnevoie ===
- National Division
  - Winners (5): 1911–12, 1913–14, 1914–15, 1915–16, 1916–17
  - Runners-up (2): 1909–10, 1917–18

=== As FC Aris Bonnevoie ===
- National Division
  - Winners (3): 1963–64, 1965–66, 1971–72
  - Runners-up (1): 1970–71
- Luxembourg Cup
  - Winners (1): 1966–67
  - Runners-up (5): 1963–64, 1967–68, 1971–72, 1975–76, 1978–79
