= US Mondorf-les-Bains =

Association football club in Luxembourg

Mondorf-Les-Bains
- Full name: US Mondorf-Les-Bains
- Founded: 1915; 111 years ago
- Ground: Stade John Grün, Mondorf-les-Bains
- Capacity: 3,600
- President: Christian Strasser
- Manager: Martin Forkel
- League: National Division
- 2025–26: National Division, 3rd of 16
- Website: www.usmondorf.lu
| Home colours | Away colours |

US Mondorf-Les-Bains is a football club based in Mondorf-les-Bains, Luxembourg. The club contains over 400 total members, making it the largest sports club in the municipality.

== History ==
US Mondorf-Les-Bains was founded in 1915, originating as a "youth club". The club has played in the National Division since the 2014–15 season

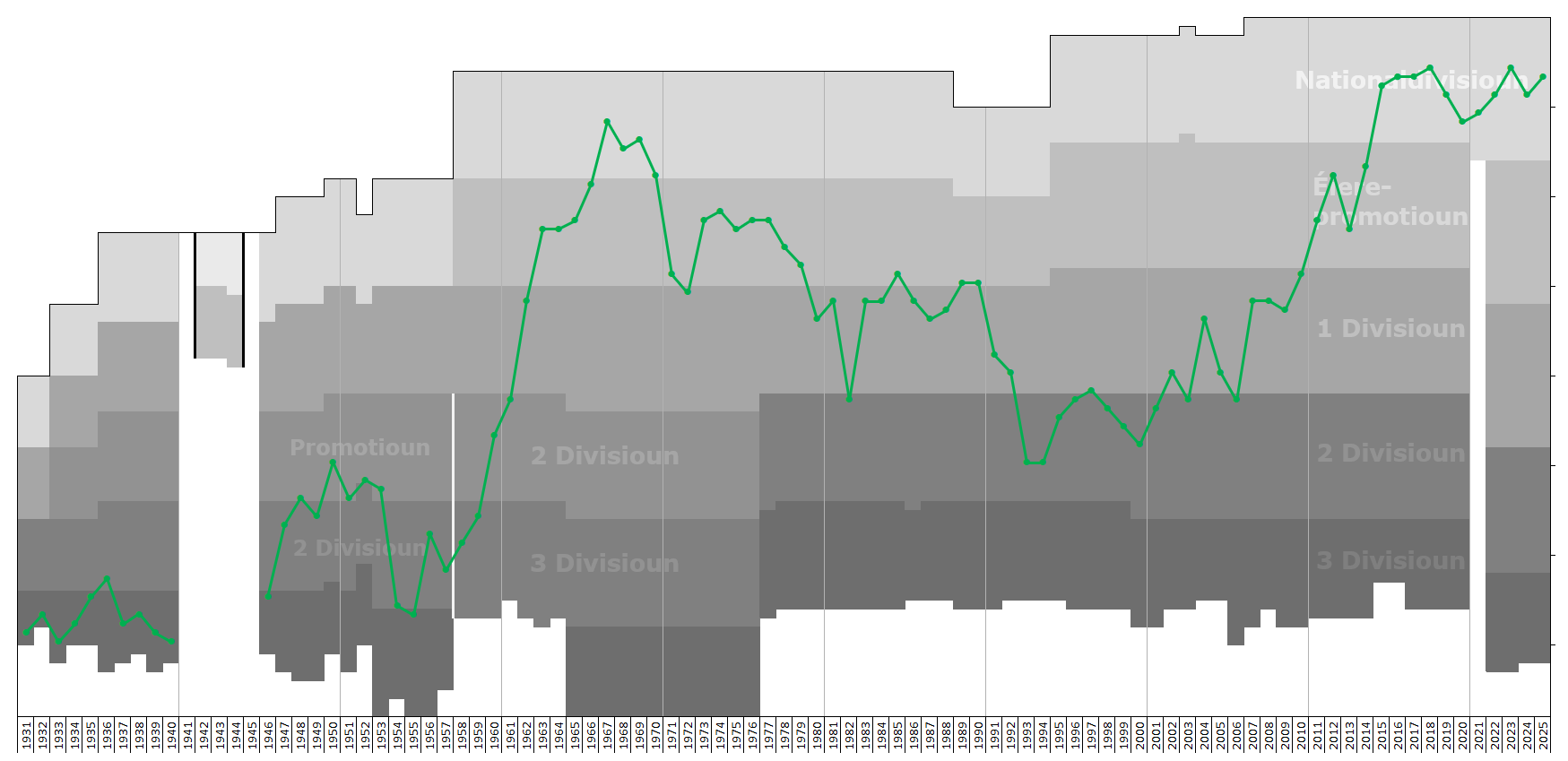
Historical league performance chart of US Mondorf-les-Bains

== European competition ==
| Competition | P | W | D | L | F | A |
|---|---|---|---|---|---|---|
| Conference League | 2 | 0 | 1 | 1 | 2 | 3 |

| Season | Competition | Round | Opponent | 1st Leg | 2nd Leg | Agg | Notes |
|---|---|---|---|---|---|---|---|
| 2026–27 Conference League | | R1 | (Georgia (country)) Dinamo Tbilisi | 1–2 (H) | 1–1 (A) | 2–3 | (Note: Decided by playing extra time in the 2nd leg) |

== Current squad ==
As of 14 September 2026

Note: Flags indicate national team as defined under FIFA eligibility rules; some limited exceptions apply. Players may hold more than one non-FIFA nationality.

| No. | Pos. | Nation | Player |
|---|---|---|---|
| 1 | GK | LUX | Joao Machado |
| 2 | MF | LUX | Gianni Lima |
| 4 | DF | FRA | Kyllian Estrada |
| 5 | MF | MAD | Clément Couturier |
| 6 | DF | FRA | Anthony Knoepffler |
| 7 | MF | LUX | Stefan Lopes |
| 10 | MF | LUX | Yannick Cervellera |
| 11 | FW | FRA | Chaaban Issaka |
| 13 | DF | FRA | Baptiste Aloé |
| 14 | FW | ALG | Sofiane Daham |
| 16 | GK | LUX | Andy Gonzalez |
| 18 | FW | FRA | Lenny Stoltz |
| 19 | DF | FRA | Yann Godart |
| 20 | MF | LUX | Gérard Mersch |
| 21 | GK | LUX | Erkan Agovic |

| No. | Pos. | Nation | Player |
|---|---|---|---|
| 23 | MF | GUF | Loïc Baal |
| 24 | DF | FRA | Mehdi Kirch |
| 26 | DF | FRA | Jacques-Antoine Pelletier |
| 27 | MF | LUX | Dwayn Holter |
| 29 | FW | FRA | Jean-Paul Kambi |
| 32 | DF | GLP | Médéric Deher |
| 40 | GK | FRA | Téo Rojca |
| 45 | FW | ITA | Louis Mendy |
| 66 | DF | LUX | Cedric Steinmetz |
| 72 | MF | LUX | Loris Tinelli |
| 76 | FW | FRA | Hatim Far |
| 77 | DF | MNE | Almir Klica |
| 94 | DF | MLI | Mantené Coulibaly |
| - | FW | FRA | Thomas Anne |

== Honours ==
- Luxembourg Cup
  - Runners-up (1): 2015-16
